= List of British television programmes =

This is a list of television series that were made for first broadcast in the United Kingdom.

== English language ==
=== 0–9 ===
- 1 vs. 100 – game show (2006–2009)
- 10 O'Clock Live – comedy/news (2011–2013)
- 10 Years Younger (UK) – makeover
- The 11 O'Clock Show – satire, comedy (1998–2000)
- 15 Storeys High – sitcom (2002–2004)
- 100% – game show (1997–2001)
- 100 Greatest Sexy Moments – documentary
- 101 Dalmatian Street – animated (2019–2020)
- 101 Ways to Leave a Gameshow – game show (2010)
- The 1900 House – historical (1999–2000)
- The 1940s House – historical/reality (2001)
- 1990 – science fiction (1977–1978)
- 2point4 Children – sitcom (1991–1999)
- 24 Hours in A&E – medical documentary
- 24 Hours in Police Custody – police documentary
- 24Seven – children's
- 29 Minutes of Fame – panel game
- 2DTV – animation comedy
- 3rd & Bird – children's
- 4 O'Clock Club – children's drama
- 5 News – news
- 50–50 – game show
- 60 Minute Makeover – reality
- 64 Zoo Lane – children's
- 8:15 from Manchester – children's magazine
- 8 Out of 10 Cats – panel game
- 8 Out of 10 Cats Does Countdown – panel game
- 999 – reality
- The £100K Drop – game show/quiz show

=== A ===
- A for Andromeda – science fiction
- AD/BC: A Rock Opera – rock opera/comedy/spoof
- Aaagh! It's the Mr. Hell Show! – animated comedy
- Above Suspicion – crime drama
- Absolutely Fabulous – sitcom
- Absolute Genius with Dick & Dom – children's factual
- Absolute Power – comedy
- Ace Lightning – children's/action/comedy
- Ace of Wands – children's
- Ackley Bridge – drama
- Action Pack – children's
- Adam Adamant Lives! – action drama
- Adrian Mole: The Cappuccino Years – comedy drama
- The Adventurer – action drama
- The Adventure Game – game show
- The Adventures of Abney & Teal – children's
- The Adventures of Parsley – children's
- The Adventures of Sherlock Holmes – detective drama
- The Adventures of Sir Lancelot – historical/fantasy drama
- The Adventures of Spot – animated
- The Adventures of William Tell – children's historical drama
- Africa – nature documentary
- After Dark – discussion programme
- After Henry – sitcom
- After Life – comedy-drama
- After You've Gone – comedy
- Afterlife – supernatural thriller
- The Afternoon Play – drama
- Agatha Christie's Marple – detective drama
- Agatha Christie's Partners in Crime – detective drama
- Agatha Christie's Poirot – detective drama
- Agatha Christie's The Secret Adversary – detective drama
- Agent Z and the Penguin from Mars – sitcom
- Agony – sitcom
- Ain't Misbehavin' – sitcom
- Airline (1982) – docusoap
- Airline (1998) – fly on the wall
- Airport – docusoap
- Al Murray's Compete for the Meat – game show
- Al Murray's Happy Hour – chat show
- Alan Davies: As Yet Untitled – talk show
- Alan Partridge: Welcome to the Places of My Life – comedy/mockumentary
- Alas Smith and Jones – comedy sketch show
- Alaska: Earth's Frozen Kingdom – nature documentary
- Albion Market – soap opera
- Alcock and Gander – sitcom
- Alexander Armstrong's Big Ask – comedy
- Alexei Sayle's Stuff – comedy sketch show
- Alfresco – sketch comedy
- All About George – sitcom
- All About Me – sitcom
- All Creatures Great and Small – drama
- All Gas and Gaiters – sitcom
- All New Blockbusters – game show
- All Our Yesterdays – history
- All Round to Mrs. Brown's – comedy/talk show
- All Star Family Fortunes – game show
- All Star Mr & Mrs – game show
- All*Star Cup – sport
- All the Small Things – drama
- 'Allo 'Allo! – sitcom
- Alphabet Castle – children's
- The Alphabet Game – comedy panel game show
- Alphabet Zoo – children's
- Alphabetical – game show
- Alphablocks – children's/animated
- Alys – drama
- Amazing Animals – children's/animated
- The Amazing Adrenalini Brothers – animated/children's
- The Amazing Mrs Pritchard – drama
- The Amazing World of Gumball – youth/animated children's/comedy
- Amazon – reality television/documentary
- Amazon Abyss – nature documentary
- Ambassadors – comedy drama
- ...And Mother Makes Five – sitcom
- ...And Mother Makes Three – sitcom
- And Then You Die – panel game show
- Andes to Amazon – nature documentary
- The Andromeda Breakthrough – science fiction
- Andy Pandy – children's
- The Angel – business/game show
- Angelina Ballerina – animated
- Angelina Ballerina: The Next Steps – animated
- Angelo's – sitcom
- Angels – medical drama
- Animal Babies – nature documentary
- Animal Kwackers – children's
- Animal Magic – children's/wildlife
- The Animals of Farthing Wood – children's
- Animal Park – wildlife documentary
- Animal Stories – animated
- Animalia – children's
- Animanimals – animated/children's
- Animated Tales of the World – animated
- Anna Karenina (1977)
- Anna Karenina (2000) – drama
- Anna Lee – drama
- Anne – drama
- Anne of Avonlea
- Anne of Green Gables – comedy
- Antiques Roadshow – antiques show
- Ant & Dec's Saturday Night Takeaway – variety show
- Any Dream Will Do – talent search show
- Any Human Heart – drama
- The Aphrodite Inheritance – drama
- Apparitions – serial/drama/mystery
- Apple Tree House – drama
- Apple Tree Yard – thriller
- The Appleyards – soap opera
- The Apprentice – reality television
- Aquarius – arts
- Are We Changing Planet Earth? – nature documentary
- Are You Being Served? – sitcom
- Are You Smarter than A 10 Year Old? (UK) – game show
- Arena – documentary
- Argumental – comedy
- The Armando Iannucci Shows – comedy
- Armchair Theatre – drama anthology
- The Army Game – sitcom
- Arrange Me a Marriage – reality television
- Arrows – music
- Art Attack – children's art
- Arthur & George – drama
- Arthur of the Britons – adventure
- As If – teen drama
- As the Bell Rings – sitcom
- As Time Goes By – situation comedy
- The Ascent of Man – documentary
- Ashes to Ashes – police drama/sci-fi/fantasy
- Ask the Family – game show
- Astro Farm – animated children's
- Asylum – comedy (1996)
- Asylum – comedy (2015)
- At Home with the Braithwaites – comedy drama
- Atlantic: The Wildest Ocean on Earth – nature documentary
- Atlantis – adventure/fantasy
- Atlantis High – comedy drama
- Auf Wiedersehen, Pet – comedy drama
- The Avengers – fantasy/sci-fi

=== B ===
- The Baby Borrowers – reality television
- Baby Jake – children's
- Back to the '50s – sitcom
- Backchat – talk show
- Baddiel's Syndrome – comedy
- Badger – drama
- Bad Education – comedy
- Bad Girls – drama
- The Bachelor – reality/drama
- Bagpuss – children's
- Baggage – dating game show
- Balamory – children's
- Balls of Steel – comedy, game show
- Ballykissangel – drama
- Banana – drama, comedy
- Bananaman – children's cartoon
- Band of Brothers – war
- Band of Gold – drama
- Bang, Bang, It's Reeves and Mortimer – comedy
- The Bank Job – game show
- Banzai – comedy
- Barbara – sitcom
- The Barchester Chronicles – drama
- Bargain Hunt – game show
- Barking – sketch comedy
- Barlow – detective series spin-off from Z Cars
- Barney – children's
- The Baron – adventure
- The Basil Brush Show – children's
- Batteries Not Included – comedy
- Battle of the Brains – quiz show
- BBC-3 – satirical comedy
- BBC News – news
- BBC Wildlife Specials – nature documentary
- BBC World News – news
- Beadle's About – hidden camera stunts
- Bear Behaving Badly – children's
- The Bear Family & Me – nature documentary
- The Beat of London – variety
- Beasts – horror
- Beat the Clock – game show
- Beat the Crusher – game show
- Beat the Star – game show
- Beat the Teacher – game show
- Beautiful People – comedy drama
- Beauty and the Geek (UK) – reality television
- Beauty School Cop Outs – reality television
- Beaver Falls – comedy drama
- Becky and Barnaby Bear – children's
- Becoming Human – supernatural drama
- The Bed-Sit Girl – sitcom
- Bedlam – drama/thriller/mystery
- Beehive – comedy
- The Beeps – animated pre-school children's
- Beggar My Neighbour – sitcom
- Behind Her Eyes – psychological thriller
- The Beiderbecke Affair – drama
- The Beiderbecke Connection – drama
- The Beiderbecke Tapes – drama
- Being Human – supernatural horror dramedy
- Bel Ami - historical drama
- Believe Nothing – situation comedy
- Bellamy's Backyard Safari – nature documentary
- Bellamy's People – comedy
- Belonging – welsh regional drama
- Ben & Holly's Little Kingdom – animated
- Ben Elton: The Man from Auntie – comedy
- The Ben Elton Show – comedy
- Benidorm – sitcom
- The Benny Hill Show – comedy/satire
- Beowulf: Return to the Shieldlands – fantasy/drama
- Bergerac – drama/action
- Bertha – children's stop motion
- Between the Lines – crime drama
- Big & Small – children's comedy
- The Big Bang – children's
- The Big Big Talent Show – talent show
- Big Break – sports game show
- The Big Breakfast – entertainment
- Big Brother – reality television series
- Big Boys – comedy
- The Big Call – game show
- Big Cat Diary – nature documentary
- Big City Park – puppet show
- Big Cook, Little Cook – children's
- Big Deal – comedy-drama
- Big Fat Gypsy Weddings – documentary
- The Big Fat Quiz of the Year – panel game
- The Big Idea – reality television
- The Big Impression – comedy/sketch show
- Big Kids – children's drama
- The Big Knights – children's/animated/comedy
- The Big Reunion – reality/documentary
- Big Ron Manager – documentary
- Big School – sitcom
- Big Star's Biggest Star – entertainment/game show
- Big Star's Little Star – entertainment/game show
- Big Ticket – game show
- Big Train – comedy sketch show
- The Biggest Loser – reality
- Bigheads – game show
- The Bill – police drama/soap opera
- Billy Bunter of Greyfriars School – children's comedy
- Bingo Night Live – interactive bingo
- BingoLotto – entertainment/game show
- Bird of Prey – drama
- Birds in the Bush – sitcom
- Birds of a Feather – sitcom
- Birdsong – drama
- The Bisexual – comedy/drama
- A Bit of Fry & Laurie – comedy sketch show
- Bits and Bobs – children's
- Bizarre ER – documentary
- The Black Adder – sitcom
- Black and Blue – comedy/drama
- The Black and White Minstrel Show – variety show
- Black Arrow – children's adventure series
- Black Books – sitcom
- Black Mirror – sci-fi/anthology
- Blackadder – sitcom
- Blackadder II – sitcom
- Blackadder the Third – sitcom
- Blackadder Goes Forth – sitcom
- Blackeyes – drama
- Blackpool – musical/comedy drama
- Blake's 7 – science fiction
- Blandings – sitcom
- Blankety Blank – game show
- Bleak House – serial drama
- The Bleak Old Shop of Stuff – sitcom
- Bless This House – sitcom
- Blessed – comedy
- Blind Date – game show
- Blips – children's
- The Block – game show
- Blockbusters – game show
- Bloodlines – thriller
- Blott on the Landscape – comedy drama
- Blue Murder – drama/crime
- Blue Peter – children's
- The Blue Planet – nature documentary
- Blue Planet II – nature documentary
- Blunder – comedy
- Bo' Selecta! – comedy
- Bob & Rose – comedy drama
- Bob and Margaret – animated/comedy
- The Bob Monkhouse Show – comedy/talk show
- Bob the Builder – children's
- Bob's Full House – game show
- Bobinogs – children's
- Bod – children's animation
- Bodger and Badger – children's
- Bodies – medical drama
- The Body Farm – police procedural
- The Body in Question – medical
- Bodyguard – drama
- Bognor or Bust – panel game
- Bonekickers – drama
- Bonkers – comedy drama
- Boo! – children's
- Boohbah – children's
- The Book Quiz – panel game
- The Book Tower – children's
- Bookaboo – children's
- Boom – children's
- Boomers – comedy
- Boon – crime drama
- Borat's Television Programme
- The Borgias – historical drama
- Bottom – sitcom
- The Bounder – sitcom
- Bounty Hunters – comedy drama
- Bouquet of Barbed Wire – drama
- Bowler – crime/sitcom
- The Box of Delights – children's
- Boy Meets Girl – sitcom
- Boyd Q.C. – courtroom drama
- Boys from the Blackstuff – drama
- Brainiac: Science Abuse – documentary (with elements of comedy)
- Brainiac's Test Tube Baby – documentary/reality television
- The Brains Trust – panel game
- Brainstorm – comedy quiz show
- BrainTeaser – game show/quiz show
- Brambly Hedge – children's
- Bramwell – drama
- Brass – sitcom
- Brass Eye – mockumentary
- Brass Tacks – factual series
- Brat Camp – reality television
- Brat Farrar – mini series
- Bread – sitcom
- Break the Safe – game show
- Breakfast News – news
- Breathless – period drama
- Breeders – comedy
- Bric-a-brac – children's
- Brief Encounters – drama
- The Brighton Belles – comedy
- Bring Me Morecambe & Wise – documentary
- Bring Me the Head of Light Entertainment – comedy
- Brit Cops – reality television
- Britain's Best Brain – game show
- Britain's Best Sitcom – documentary
- Britain's Bloodiest Dynasty – documentary
- Britain's Brainiest Kid – game show
- Britain's Brightest – game show
- Britain's Got Talent – reality/talent show
- Britain's Hardest – game show
- Britain's Missing Top Model – reality show
- Britain's Next Top Model – reality show
- Britain's Psychic Challenge – reality show
- Britain's Secret Treasures – documentary
- Britannia – period drama
- Britannia High – teen/musical drama
- British Isles – A Natural History – nature documentary
- Brideshead Revisited – drama
- The Brittas Empire – sitcom
- Broadchurch – crime drama
- Bromwell High – animated children's
- Brookside – serial drama
- The Brothers – drama
- Brothers in Law – sitcom
- Bruiser – comedy sketch show
- Brum – children's
- Brush Strokes – sitcom
- A Brush with Fame – art show
- The Bubble – comedy/game show
- Buddy – school drama
- Budgie – comedy drama
- Budgie the Little Helicopter – children's
- Bugs – science fiction / action-adventure
- Bull – sitcom
- Bulletproof – drama
- Bullseye – game show
- Buried – drama
- Burn It – drama
- Burn Up – drama
- Burnside – police drama
- Bus Life – sitcom
- Business Centre Europe – news
- Bust (TV series) – comedy drama
- Butterflies – sitcom
- Butterfly – drama
- The Button – game show
- Button Moon – children's
- By Any Means (2008) – documentary
- By Any Means (2013) – crime drama
- By the Sword Divided – drama
- Byker Grove – children's/teen drama

=== C ===
- C.A.B. – children's
- CI5: The New Professionals – action/crime drama
- Cadfael – detective drama
- The Café – sitcom
- Café Continental – variety show
- Cakes and Ale
- California Dreaming – reality television
- Call My Bluff – game show
- Call the Midwife – drama
- Callan – action/crime drama
- Camberwick Green – children's
- Camelot – historical drama
- Camp Orange – reality
- Campion – mystery drama
- Campus – sitcom
- Candid Camera – hidden camera stunts
- Canned Carrott – comedy
- Can't Cook, Won't Cook – game show/cooking
- Cape Wrath – drama
- Capital City – drama
- Captain Pugwash – children's
- Captain Scarlet and the Mysterons – science fiction
- Captain Zed and the Zee Zone – children's animated
- Cardiac Arrest – medical drama
- Caribbean Cops – documentary
- Carpool – chat show
- Carrie and Barry – comedy
- Carrie's War – children's
- Carrott's Lib – satirical comedy
- Casanova (1971) – drama
- Casanova (2005) – comedy drama
- Case Histories – crime drama
- Case Sensitive – crime drama
- Cash Cab – game show
- Cash in the Attic – antiques
- Castle Farm – children's
- Castle Haven – soap opera
- Castles – drama
- Casualty – medical drama
- Casualty 1900s – medical drama
- Casualty@Holby City – medical drama
- The Cat in the Hat Knows a Lot About That! – children's animated
- Catastrophe (2008) – documentary
- Catastrophe (2015) – sitcom
- Catchphrase – game show
- Catchword – game show
- The Catherine Tate Show – comedy sketch show
- Catherine the Great – drama
- Cathy Come Home – social drama
- Cats' Eyes – children's
- C.A.T.S. Eyes – action drama
- Catterick – comedy
- Catweazle – children's
- Cause Célèbre – drama
- CD:UK – music
- The Cedar Tree – soap opera
- CelebAir – reality television
- Celebrity Big Brother – reality television series
- Celebrity Coach Trip – reality
- Celebrity Fit Club – reality television
- Celebrity Juice – comedy/panel game
- Celebrity Karaoke Club – reality television
- Celebrity MasterChef – competition cooking show
- Celebrity Squares – comedy game show/panel game
- Celebrity Super Spa – reality television
- Celebs Go Dating – reality television
- Century Falls – thriller/drama/horror
- Chain Letters – game show
- Chalk – situation comedy
- Challenge Anneka – entertainment
- Champion Blockbusters – game show
- The Champions – drama
- Chandler and Company
- The Changes – fantasy
- Changing Rooms – lifestyle
- The Channel Four Daily – breakfast television
- Chaos at the Chateau – reality
- Charlie and Lola – children's/animated
- Charlie Brooker's Gameswipe – game show
- Charlie Brooker's Screenwipe – stories/commentary
- Charlie Brooker's Weekly Wipe – review
- Charlie Chalk – stop motion
- The Chart Show – music
- Charters and Caldicott – mystery
- Chartjackers – documentary/reality television
- The Chase – drama
- The Chase – game show/quiz show
- Chased by Dinosaurs – documentary
- Chef! – situation comedy
- Chelmsford 123 – comedy
- Chernobyl – drama
- Chess Masters: The Endgame – game show
- Chewing Gum – sitcom
- Chickens – sitcom
- Chico Bon Bon: Monkey with a Tool Belt – children's/animated
- Child's Play – game show
- Children of the Stones – science fiction
- Children's Emergency – documentary
- Children's Ward – children's medical drama
- The Chinese Detective – police drama
- Chinese Food Made Easy – cooking
- The Chinese Puzzle – children's/thriller/adventure
- Chip and Potato – animated/children's
- Chloe's Closet – animated/children's
- The Choir – documentary/reality television
- The Choir: Sing While You Work – reality/documentary
- Chuggington – children's
- Chock-A-Block – children's
- Chocky – science fiction
- Chocky's Challenge – science fiction
- Chocky's Children – science fiction
- Chop Socky Chooks – comedy/action/fantasy/animated
- Chorlton and the Wheelies – children's
- Christabel – drama
- A Christmas Carol – fantasy
- The Chronicles of Narnia – fantasy
- ChuckleVision – situation comedy
- CI5: The New Professionals – crime drama
- Cirque de Celebrité – celebrity/reality television
- The Citadel – drama
- Citizen Khan – sitcom
- Citizen Smith – situation comedy
- City Central – police drama
- City Hospital – medical documentary
- City of Vice – drama
- The Clairvoyant – sitcom
- Clangers – children's
- Clarence – situation comedy
- Clarissa – period drama
- Class (2016) – science fiction
- The Cleaner – sitcom
- Cleaning Up – drama
- Cleverdicks – game show
- The Clifton House Mystery - supernatural children's
- Clique – drama/thriller
- Clocking Off – drama
- Clone – comedy
- Close to Home – sitcom
- Clouds of Witness
- Cluedo – game show
- Coach Trip – reality
- Coast – documentary
- The Code – documentary
- Codex – quiz show
- Cold Comfort Farm
- Cold Feet – drama
- Cold Lazarus – drama/science fiction
- Colditz (1972) – historical drama
- Colditz (2005) – drama
- The Collection – drama
- The Colour of Money – game show
- Come and Have a Go If You Think You're Smart Enough – game show
- Come Back Mrs. Noah – sitcom
- Come Dancing – dance contest
- Come Date with Me – reality
- Come Dine with Me – reality/cooking
- Come Fly with Me – comedy/mockumentary
- Come Outside – children's/educational
- Comedy Connections – documentary
- Comedy Lab – comedy
- Comedy Playhouse – comedy anthology
- Comic Relief Does Fame Academy – reality/talent show
- Comic Relief Does The Apprentice – reality television
- Comic Roots – biography
- Coming of Age – sitcom
- The Comic Strip Presents – comedy anthology
- The Commander – police drama
- Common As Muck – comedy drama
- Commonwealth Jazz Club – music miniseries
- Compact – soap opera
- Cone Zone – sitcom
- Congo – nature documentary
- Connections – documentary
- Connections – game show
- Connie – drama
- Connie the Cow – children's
- Construction Site – children's
- The Contender Challenge: UK vs. USA – sports
- Conviction – crime drama
- Cooking with the Stars – competition cooking show
- ...Cooks! – cookery
- The Cops – drama
- Cop Squad – documentary
- Coppers – documentary
- Coronation Street – soap opera
- Count Arthur Strong – sitcom
- Count Duckula – children's
- Countdown – quiz show
- Counterfeit Cat – science fiction/comedy
- Counterstrike – science fiction
- Coupling – situation comedy
- Cousins – nature documentary
- Countryfile – nature
- Crackanory – comedy
- Cracker – psychological drama
- Crackerjack – children's variety
- The Cramp Twins – comedy/animated
- Crane – drama
- Cranford – comedy drama
- Crash – medical drama
- Crashing – comedy drama
- The Crezz – drama
- Cribb – crime/mystery
- Crime and Punishment
- Crime Traveller – science fiction, detective drama
- Criminal Justice – thriller/drama/legal
- Criss Cross Quiz – game show
- Crocodile Shoes – drama
- Crooked House – mystery drama
- Crossroads – soap opera
- Crosswits – game show
- The Crouches – sitcom
- The Crown – drama
- Crown Court – legal drama
- The Crust
- The Crystal Cube – mockumentary
- The Crystal Maze – game show
- Crystal Tipps and Alistair – children's
- The Cube – game show
- Cuckoo – sitcom
- The Cuckoo Waltz – sitcom
- Cucumber – drama, comedy
- Cuffs – police procedural
- Cuffy – sitcom
- The Culture Vultures - sitcom
- The Cup – mockumentary/comedy
- Curry and Chips – situation comedy
- The Cut – teen drama

=== D ===
- Da Ali G Show – satirical
- Da Vinci's Demons – drama/fantasy/adventure
- Dad's Army – situation comedy
- Dale's Supermarket Sweep – game show
- Dalgliesh – police drama
- Dalziel & Pascoe – crime drama
- The Dame Edna Treatment – talk show
- Damon and Debbie – drama
- Dan Dare: Pilot of the Future – animation
- DanceX – reality television
- Dancing on Ice – talent show
- Danger! 50,000 Volts! – survival
- Danger Man – adventure drama/espionage
- Danger Mouse (1981) – children's
- Danger Mouse (2015) – action/adventure/comedy
- Danger UXB – action drama
- The Dangerous Brothers – situation comedy
- Dani's Castle – sitcom
- Dani's House – children's
- Daniel Deronda – drama
- DanTDM Creates a Big Scene – live-action animation
- Dappledown Farm – children's
- Dara Ó Briain: School of Hard Sums – comedy
- Dara O Briain's Go 8 Bit – comedy panel game
- The Darling Buds of May – comedy/drama
- Dark Knight – action/adventure
- A Dark-Adapted Eye – drama
- The Dark: Nature's Nighttime World – nature documentary
- Dark Angel – crime drama/thriller
- The Dark Angel
- Dark Season – teen drama/science fiction
- The Dark Side of the Sun – drama
- Date My Mom (UK) – dating game show
- Dates – drama
- Dating in the Dark – dating game show
- Dave Gorman: Modern Life is Goodish – stand-up comedy
- Dave's One Night Stand – stand-up comedy
- The Day Today – news spoof/comedy/satire
- A Day with Dana – chat show
- Days Like These – comedy
- DCI Banks – crime drama
- Dead Boss – sitcom
- Dead Gorgeous
- Dear John – sitcom
- Dead Man Weds
- Dead of Night – anthology series/supernatural fiction
- Dead Ringers – comedy/satire
- Dead Set – horror drama
- Deadline (1995) – documentary
- Deadline (2007) – reality television
- Deadly – wildlife documentary
- Deadly 60 – children's wildlife documentary
- Deal or No Deal – game show
- Dear John – situation comedy
- Dear Mother...Love Albert – sitcom
- Death Comes to Pemberley – drama
- Death in Paradise – crime/drama/comedy
- Decline and Fall – comedy drama
- The Deep – drama
- Deep Secrets
- Defying Gravity – drama/science fiction
- Delta Wave – children's
- The Demon Headmaster – children's
- Dempsey and Makepeace – action drama
- Dennis & Gnasher: Unleashed! – animated
- Dennis the Menace and Gnasher (1996) – animated
- Dennis the Menace and Gnasher (2009) – animated
- Department S – action drama
- Demons – supernatural drama/horror
- Derek – comedy drama
- Derry Girls – comedy
- Desperate Scousewives – reality television
- The Detectives – situation comedy
- Detectorists – comedy
- The Devil's Dinner Party – reality game show
- Dial M – rock music
- Diamonds – drama
- The Diary of Anne Frank (1987) – drama
- The Diary of Anne Frank (2009) – drama
- The Diary of Samuel Pepys - historical drama
- Dick & Dom in da Bungalow – children's comedy game show
- Dickinson's Real Deal – antique show
- Dickens of London – drama
- Dickensian – drama
- Dice – drama
- Die Kinder – thriller
- Digby Dragon – animated
- dinnerladies – situation comedy
- Dino Babies – animated
- Dinosapien – science fiction/fantasy
- Dinosaur – comedy drama
- Dipdap – children's
- Dirk Gently – science fiction
- Dirty Money – game show
- Dirty Dancing: The Time of Your Life – reality television
- Disappearing World – documentary
- Discovery – documentary
- Disney's CyberStar – children's
- Disney Time – children's
- Disraeli – drama
- Distant Shores – comedy drama
- Distraction – game show
- The District Nurse – drama
- Divided – game show
- Dixon of Dock Green – police drama
- DIY SOS
- The DJ Kat Show – children's
- Do Not Adjust Your Set – comedy show, originally for children
- Do You Still Wish You Were Here...? – holiday travel
- Doc Martin – comedy drama
- Doctor, Doctor – daily show
- Doctor at Large – comedy
- Doctor at Sea – comedy
- Doctor at the Top – comedy
- Doctor Finlay – medical drama
- Doctor Finlay's Casebook – medical drama
- Doctor in Charge – comedy
- Doctor in the House – comedy
- Doctor on the Go – comedy
- Doctor Who – science fiction
- Doctors – soap opera
- The Doctors – drama
- Doctors to Be – documentary
- Doctors to Be: 20 Years On – documentary
- The Dog Ate My Homework – children's game show
- Dog Eat Dog – game show
- Dolphins – Spy in the Pod – factual
- Don't Ask Me – science information
- Don't Drink the Water – sitcom
- Don't Forget the Lyrics! (UK) – game show
- Don't Forget Your Toothbrush – game show/light entertainment
- Don't Quote Me – panel game
- Don't Stop Believing – reality television/talent show
- Don't Stop Me Now – talent show/game show
- Don't Tell the Bride – reality
- Don't Wait Up – comedy
- Doomwatch – science fictional
- The Door – reality television
- Double Dare – game show
- Double Your Money – game show
- Doubt – thriller
- Down to Earth (1995) – situation comedy
- Down to Earth (2000) – comedy drama
- Downton Abbey – historical drama
- Dr. Finlay's Casebook – comedy drama
- Dr. Jekyll and Mr. Hyde – drama
- Dr. Terrible's House of Horrible – comedy/horror
- Dracula (2013) – horror drama/thriller
- Dracula (2020) – horror drama
- Dragons Alive – nature documentary
- Dragons' Den – business
- Dramarama – children's
- Dream Street – children's
- Dream Stuffing – sitcom
- Dream Team – drama
- Drive – reality game show
- The Driver – crime drama
- Drop Dead Gorgeous – comedy drama
- Drop the Dead Donkey – comedy/satire
- Drunk History – comedy
- The Dublin Murders – drama/crime
- Dude, That's My Ghost! – comedy/supernatural
- The Duchess of Duke Street – historical drama
- Duck Quacks Don't Echo – comedy/panel game show
- Dumber & Dumberest – comedy show
- The Dumping Ground – children's/comedy drama
- The Dumping Ground Survival Files – children's/comedy drama
- The Durrells – biography/drama
- Duty Free – situation comedy
- Dying Day
- Dynasties – nature documentary

=== E ===
- Early Doors – sitcom
- Earth's Greatest Spectacles – nature documentary
- Earth's Seasonal Secrets – nature documentary
- Earthflight – nature documentary
- EastEnders – soap opera
- EastEnders: E20 – soap opera
- Eat Well for Less? – food documentary
- Ebb and Flo – animated children's
- Echo Beach – soap opera
- Ed vs. Spencer – game show
- Eddie Stobart: Trucks & Trailers – documentary
- Eddy and the Bear – children's
- Edge of Darkness – thriller
- Educating Archie – sitcom
- Educating Cardiff – reality television
- Educating the East End – reality television
- Educating Essex – reality television
- Educating Greater Manchester – reality television
- Educating Joey Essex – reality television
- Educating Yorkshire – reality television
- Edward & Mrs. Simpson – historical drama
- The Edwardian Country House – reality
- Eldorado – soap opera
- Elephant Family & Me – nature documentary
- Eleventh Hour – drama
- Elizabeth I (2005) – historical drama
- Elizabeth I (2017) – docudrama
- Elizabeth R – historical drama
- Elliott from Earth – science fiction/animated/comedy
- Embarrassing Bodies – medical
- Emergency – Ward 10 – medical drama
- Emergency with Angela Griffin – documentary
- Emma (1972) – serial
- Emma (2009) – drama
- Emmerdale – soap opera
- Empire – documentary
- Empire Road – drama
- Empty – comedy
- The End of the F***ing World – comedy drama
- Endeavour – crime drama
- Enemy at the Door – historical drama
- Engie Benjy – children's
- The Enigma Files – detective
- Episodes – sitcom
- Equinox – science series
- The Escape Artist – drama thriller
- Escape to the Country – reality
- Escape to the Château – reality show
- Eternal Law – fantasy drama
- Europe: A Natural History – nature documentary
- Europe This Week – news
- Europe Today – talk show/news
- Europe Tonight – news
- European Closing Bell – news
- European Market Watch – news/talk show
- European Market Wrap – news
- Ever Decreasing Circles – situation comedy
- The Evermoor Chronicles – fantasy/sitcom/mystery/comedy-drama
- Every Second Counts – game show
- Ex on the Beach – reality television
- The Exit List – game show
- Expedition Borneo – nature documentary
- Extraordinary People (1992) – documentary
- Extraordinary People (2003) – documentary
- Extras – situation comedy
- Extreme A&E – medical documentary
- Extreme Mountain Challenge – nature documentary
- Eyewitness – history/documentary

=== F ===
- The F Word – cooking show/food magazine
- FAQ U – broadcast
- Fabian of the Yard – police drama
- The Face – reality television
- Facejacker – comedy
- The Fades – horror drama
- Fairly Secret Army – situation comedy
- Fairy Tales – drama
- Faith in the Future – comedy
- Fake or Fortune? – documentary
- Faking It – makeover/challenge show/reality television
- Falcón – crime drama
- The Fall and Rise of Reginald Perrin – situation comedy
- The Fall – crime drama
- Fall of Eagles – historical drama
- Fame Academy – talent show/reality
- Families – soap opera
- Family – crime drama
- The Family (1974) – reality/documentary
- The Family (2008) – reality/documentary
- Family Affairs (1949) – comedy
- Family Affairs (1959)
- Family Affairs (1997) – soap opera
- A Family at War – drama
- Family Business – drama
- Family Catchphrase – game show
- Family Food Fight – cooking
- Family Fortunes – game show
- The Family Man – medical drama
- The Family-Ness – children's
- Family Pride – soap opera
- Family Tree – documentary-style/comedy
- Famous and Fearless – reality television
- The Famous Five – children's/adventure
- The Farm – reality television
- Farmer Wants a Wife – reality television
- The Fashion Show – fashion
- The Fast Show – comedy/satire
- Fat Dog Mendoza – comedy/fantasy/animated
- Fat Families – documentary
- Fat Friends – drama
- Father, Dear Father – sitcom
- Father Brown (1974) – detective drama
- Father Brown (2013) – detective drama
- Father Ted – sitcom
- Fawlty Towers – situation comedy (1975–1979)
- Fax – factual series
- Fear, Stress & Anger – sitcom
- Fear Factor – game show
- Feel the Fear – children's
- The Fenn Street Gang – sitcom
- Fiddlers Three – situation comedy
- Fiddley Foodle Bird – animated children's
- Fifi and the Flowertots – animated children's
- Fifteen to One – quiz show
- Fight for Life – health
- FightBox – game show
- Filthy Rich & Catflap – situation comedy
- Fimbles – children's
- The Final Cut – drama
- A Fine Romance – situation comedy
- Finley the Fire Engine – children's
- Fireman Sam – children's
- The First – drama
- The First Churchills – history
- First Class – game show
- First Cut – documentary
- The First Eden – nature documentary
- The First Lady – drama
- First Life – nature documentary
- First of the Summer Wine – comedy
- Fist of Fun – comedy
- The Fitz – sitcom
- The Five – mystery
- Five News – news
- Five News At 7 – news
- Five News World Cup Report – news
- The Five Red Herrings
- The Fix – celebrity
- Fixer – action comedy
- The Fixer – drama
- Flack – drama
- Flambards – period drama
- The Flame Trees of Thika – historical drama
- Fleabag – drama
- The Flipside of Dominick Hide – science fiction
- Flog It! – antiques show
- Floogals – live-action/animated
- Floodtide – crime drama
- Florrie's Dragons – animated/children's
- Flower Pot Men – children's
- The Flumps – children's
- Flying Squad – documentary
- FM – situation comedy
- Follyfoot – children's series early 1970s
- Fonejacker – comedy sketch show
- Food Glorious Food – cooking show
- Football's Next Star – sports/reality television
- Footballers' Wives – drama
- Footballers' Wives: Extra Time – spin-off drama
- Forgotten
- Fort Boyard – game show
- For the Children – children's series
- For the Love of Ada – sitcom
- For the Rest of Your Life – game show
- Forever Green – family drama
- Fortitude – psychological thriller
- The Forsyte Saga (1967) – drama
- The Forsyte Saga (2002) – drama
- The Forsyte Saga: To Let – drama
- Fortune: Million Pound Giveaway – reality television
- The Fortunes and Misfortunes of Moll Flanders – drama
- Fortunes of War – drama
- The Fosters – sitcom
- Four in a Bed – reality television game show
- Four Rooms – factual
- Four Weddings – lifestyle/reality/game show
- Fox – drama
- Foyle's War – police drama
- Fraggle Rock – children's
- The Frankenstein Chronicles – crime drama
- Frankie – drama
- Franny's Feet – children's/animated
- Free Agents – comedy
- Free Rein – children's
- Freewheelers – children's action series
- Freezing – comedy
- French and Saunders – comedy sketch show
- Fresh Fields – situation comedy
- Fresh Meat – comedy drama
- Freshly Squeezed – breakfast television
- Friday Night Dinner – comedy
- The Friday Night Project – comedy/chat show
- Friday Night with Jonathan Ross – comedy/entertainment
- Fried – comedy
- Fruit Fancies – comedy
- Fry's Planet Word – documentary
- From There to Here – drama
- Frozen Planet – nature documentary
- Full House – sitcom
- Fun House – children's game show
- Fun Song Factory – children's
- Funky Valley – children's
- Funland – comedy/thriller
- The Furchester Hotel – puppet

=== G ===
- Gadget Geeks – technology
- The Gadget Show – factual
- Galápagos – nature documentary
- Gallowglass – drama
- The Gambler
- The Game (2014) – thriller, drama
- The Game (2025) – thriller, drama
- Game, Set, and Match
- Game for a Laugh – hidden camera stunts
- Game On – situation comedy
- Gamer.tv – video games
- The Games – reality television
- Games World – entertainment/video game
- Gameshow Marathon – game show
- Gamezville – video games
- Gangs of London – action/drama
- Ganges – nature documentary
- Gangsters – drama
- The Garage – documentary/reality television
- Gardeners' World – factual
- Garnock Way – soap opera
- Garrow's Law – legal drama
- Garth Marenghi's Darkplace – comedy (spoof)
- Gash – comedy
- Gaspard and Lisa – children's/animated
- Gavin & Stacey – comedy/drama
- Gemma Collins: Diva – reality television
- Gemma Collins: Everything. All At Once. – documentary/reality television
- Gemma Collins: Self-Harm & Me – documentary
- Gems – soap opera
- Genie in the House – children's comedy/drama
- Genius – comedy game show
- General Hospital – drama
- The Generation Game – game show
- The Gentle Touch – police drama
- Gentleman Jack – drama
- Geordie Shore – reality television
- George and Mildred – situation comedy
- George and the Dragon – situation comedy
- The Georgian House – children's supernatural
- Get a Grip – satirical comedy
- Get Lost! – drama
- Get Real – sitcom
- Get Some In! – sitcom
- Getting On – comedy
- The Ghost Hunter – fantasy drama
- Ghosts – sitcom
- The Ghosts of Motley Hall – children's supernatural
- Gideon's Way – police drama
- Gigglebiz – children's
- Gimme Gimme Gimme – situation comedy
- The Ginger Tree – period drama
- The Gingerbread Man – children's stop motion
- Girl Friday – reality television
- Girlfriends (2012) – reality television
- Girlfriends (2018) – drama
- Girls Aloud: Off the Record – reality television
- Girls in Love – children's drama
- Give Out Girls – sitcom
- Give Us a Clue – panel game
- Gladiators (Original) – game show
- Gladiators (First Revival) – game show
- Gladiators (Second Revival) – game show
- Gladiators: Train 2 Win – sports
- Glee Club
- Globe Trekker – travel/adventure
- Glue – drama
- Go For It – game show
- God's Gift – game show
- Gods in the Sky – history
- Gogglebox – reality
- Gogs – clay animation/animation style
- Going, Going, Gone – antiques quiz show
- Going for Gold – game show
- Going Live! – children's magazine show
- Going Straight – porridge spin-off situation comedy
- Golden Balls – game show
- The Golden Bowl
- The Good Karma Hospital – medical drama
- The Good Life – situation comedy
- The Good Old Days – variety
- Good Omens – comedy
- The Goodies – comedy
- Goodness Gracious Me – comedy sketch show/satire
- Goodnight Sweetheart – situation comedy
- The Gophers – animated
- Gordon Ramsay's Bank Balance – game show
- Gordon the Garden Gnome – children's
- Got to Dance – reality talent show
- The Governor – crime drama
- Grace & Favour – sitcom
- Grady – drama
- The Graham Norton Show – comedy
- Gran – children's stop motion
- The Grand – drama
- Grand Designs
- Grand Slam (1981) – game show
- Grand Slam (2003) – game show
- The Grand Tour – factual (with comical elements)
- Grandma's House – sitcom
- Grandpa in My Pocket – children's
- Grandstand – sports
- Grange Hill – children's drama
- Grantchester – detective drama
- Grass – situation comedy
- Grease: The School Musical – reality television
- Grease Is the Word – reality television/talent show
- Great Barrier Reef (2012) – nature documentary
- Great Barrier Reef (2015) – nature documentary
- The Great British Bake Off – contest/game show
- Great British Railway Journeys – travel documentary
- The Great British Year
- The Great Egg Race – reality/technology
- Great Expectations (1967) – drama
- Great Expectations (1981) – drama
- Great Expectations (1991) – drama
- Great Expectations (2011) – drama
- Great Expectations (2023) – drama
- The Great Interior Design Challenge – factual
- Great Night Out – comedy/drama
- Great Ormond Street – documentary
- The Great Rift: Africa's Wild Heart – nature documentary
- The Great Train Robbery – crime drama
- The Greatest Dancer – reality television
- Greed (UK) – game show
- The Green Green Grass – sitcom
- Green Wing – situation comedy
- Greenhouse Academy – children's
- The Grid – drama/action/thriller
- The Grimleys – situation comedy
- The Growing Pains of Adrian Mole – comedy-drama
- The Growing Pains of PC Penrose – situation comedy
- Grown Ups – sitcom
- Grownups – sitcom
- The Grove Family – soap opera
- Guerrilla – drama
- The Guess List – comedy/panel game
- Guess with Jess – animated
- Guesstimation – game show
- Guilty! – mock television
- Gulliver's Travels – based on Jonathan Swift's Gulliver's Travels

=== H ===
- Hacker Time – children's
- Haggard – comedy
- Hairspray: The School Musical – reality television
- Hale & Pace – sketch comedy show
- Hallelujah! – sitcom/comedy
- Hamish Macbeth – comedy drama
- Hana's Helpline – animated
- Hancock's Half Hour – situation comedy
- Happy Families – comedy/children's
- Happy Monster Band – animated children's
- Happy Valley – police drama
- Hard Sun – crime drama
- Hardball – game show
- Hardware – sitcom
- Hark at Barker – situation comedy
- Harley Street – medical drama
- Harlots – period drama
- Harry & Paul – sketch comedy
- Harry and Cosh – children's
- Harry and His Bucket Full of Dinosaurs – children's
- Harry Enfield and Chums – sketch comedy
- Harry Enfield's Brand Spanking New Show – sketch show
- Harry Enfield's Television Programme – sketch comedy
- Harry Hill – stand-up/sketch comedy
- Harry Hill's Alien Fun Capsule – comedy
- Harry Hill's Shark Infested Custard – children's
- Harry Hill's Tea Time – comedy
- Harry Hill's TV Burp – comedy
- Harry Worth (later Here's Harry) – Situation Comedy
- Harry & Paul – comedy sketch show
- Harry's Game – thriller
- Harry's Mad – comedy/drama
- Hartbeart – children's
- Haunted – drama
- Havakazoo – children's
- Have I Got News for You – panel game / satire
- Having It Off – situation comedy
- Hazell – drama
- He Knew He Was Right – drama
- Head over Heels – comedy-drama
- Heat of the Sun – police drama
- Heartbeat – police drama
- Heartburn Hotel – sitcom
- Hearts of Gold – game show/devised
- Heartstopper – teen comedy drama
- Heathrow: Britain's Busiest Airport – documentary
- Hebburn – comedy
- Helicopter Heroes – documentary
- Hell's on Wheel – drama, western (2011–2016)
- Hell's Kitchen – chef
- Hello Cheeky – radio comedy
- The Hello Girls – comedy drama
- Help – comedy
- Henry IX – comedy
- Henry VIII – drama
- Henry VIII and His Six Wives – documentary
- The Herbs – children's
- Hercule Poirot – detective drama
- Here's Harry (initially Harry Worth) – situation comedy
- Hero: 108 – animated
- Heroes and Villains – docudrama
- The Heroic Quest of the Valiant Prince Ivandoe – animated/fantasy/comedy
- Hetty Wainthropp Investigates – detective drama
- Hex – comedy drama
- Hey Duggee – animated
- Hi-5 UK – children's
- Hi-de-Hi! – situation comedy
- Hidden Kingdoms – factual/documentary
- Higgledy House – children's
- High Hopes – sitcom
- The High Life – sitcom
- High Living – soap opera
- High Stakes – game show
- Hilda – animated
- Him & Her – comedy
- Hippies – comedy
- Hit & Miss – drama
- Hit Me, Baby, One More Time – reality television
- The Hitchhiker's Guide to the Galaxy – comedy / science fiction
- The Hive – animated/children's
- Hoff the Record – comedy/satire
- Holby City – medical drama
- HolbyBlue – police drama
- Holding Out for a Hero – game show
- Holding the Baby – sitcom
- Hole in the Wall – game show
- Holiday – travel
- Holiday Showdown – reality
- The Hollow Crown – historical drama
- Hollyoaks – serial drama
- Hollyoaks Later – serial drama spin-off
- Hollyoaks Let Loose – serial drama spin-off
- Hollyoaks: In the City – serial drama spin-off
- The Hollyoaks Music Show – music
- Hollyoaks: No Going Back – serial drama spin-off
- Hollyoaks: The Morning After the Night Before – serial drama spin-off
- Hollywood 7 – sitcom/family entertainment
- Home Fires – period drama
- Home to Roost – situation comedy
- Honest – comedy drama
- Honey, We're Killing the Kids – documentary
- The Hoobs – children's
- Hooten & the Lady – drama
- Hope and Glory – drama
- Hope Springs – comedy drama
- Horizon – factual (science)
- Horne & Corden – sketch show
- Horrid Henry – children's animated comedy
- Hospital 24/7 – reality television/medical documentary
- Hot Property – game show
- Hotel – documentary
- The Hotel – documentary
- Hotel Babylon – drama
- The Hotel Inspector – documentary
- Hotel of Mum and Dad – reality television
- Hotter Than My Daughter – reality television
- Houdini & Doyle – drama
- The Hour – period drama
- House Auction – documentary
- House Doctor – reality television
- House Gift – lifestyle/game show
- House Guest – reality television
- House of Anubis – teen drama/mystery action
- House of Cards – political drama
- House of Fools – comedy
- House of Saddam – biography
- The House of Eliott – historical drama
- How – educational
- How 2 – children's art
- How Clean Is Your House? – reality television
- How Do You Solve a Problem like Maria? – talent search show
- How Green Was My Valley – drama
- How Not to Decorate – Reality television
- How Not to Live Your Life – comedy
- How to Look Good Naked – reality television
- How to Start Your Own Country – reality
- How to Live Longer – reality
- How TV Ruined Your Life – satire
- How Videogames Changed the World – entertainment
- Howards' Way – drama
- Hullraisers – comedy
- Human Planet – documentary
- Human Remains – black comedy
- Humans – science fiction
- Hunderby – sitcom
- The Hunger – drama/horror
- The Hunt – nature documentary
- Hunted (2012) – drama/spy
- Hunted (2015) – reality show
- The Hurting – comedy clip show
- Hurricanes – animated
- Hustle – crime drama/caper
- Hyperdrive – comedy / science fiction
- Hypothetical – comedy/panel game

=== I ===
- I, Claudius – historical drama
- I'd Do Anything (2002) – drama
- I'd Do Anything (2008) – talent search show
- I'm a Celebrity...Get Me Out of Here! – celebrity/reality
- I'm Alan Partridge – situation comedy
- I Am Not an Animal – animated comedy
- I Can Cook – children's
- I Didn't Know You Cared – situation comedy
- I Dream – children's
- I Love My Country – comedy
- I Never Knew That About Britain – entertainment
- I Survived a Zombie Apocalypse – reality game show
- I Want My Little Boy Back – autism/documentary
- I Woke Up One Morning – sitcom
- Ian Hislop's Stiff Upper Lip – An Emotional History of Britain – documentary
- Ibiza Weekender – reality television
- Ice Age Giants – nature documentary
- Ice Warriors – game show
- An Idiot Abroad – adventure comedy
- Ideal – situation comedy
- Identity – game show
- Identity – police procedural
- If I Can Dream – docusoap
- If I Ruled the World – game show
- In for a Penny – game show
- In Plain Sight – drama
- In Sickness and in Health – situation comedy
- In the Dark – crime drama
- In the Flesh – drama/horror
- In the Night Garden... – children's
- In Town Tonight – entertainment personalities
- The Inbetweeners – situation comedy
- Indelible Evidence – crime
- The Indestructibles (2006) – documentary
- The Indestructibles (2015) – sports
- India: Nature's Wonderland – nature documentary
- The Indian Doctor – period drama
- Indian School – documentary
- Indian Summers – drama (2015–2016)
- Industry – drama
- Ink Thief – children's drama
- The Innocents – supernatural drama/horror
- Inside Gatwick – reality television/documentary
- Inside Life – nature documentary
- Inside No. 9 – dark comedy
- Inside Sainsbury's: Britain's Oldest Supermarket – documentary
- The Inspector Alleyn Mysteries – crime drama
- Inspector George Gently – crime drama
- Inspector Lewis – detective drama
- The Inspector Lynley Mysteries – police drama
- Inspector Morse – detective drama
- Inspector Wexford – detective drama
- Instinct – drama
- The Interviews
- Into the Blue
- The Invisibles – comedy drama
- The Irish R.M. – period comedy/drama
- Iron Chef UK – cooking show
- Is It Legal? – sitcom
- Is This Your Life? – Andrew Neil interviews
- Island at War – drama
- An Island Parish – documentary
- Islands of Britain – documentary
- The IT Crowd – situation comedy
- It Ain't Half Hot Mum – situation comedy
- It's a Knockout – game show
- It's a Square World – offbeat comedy
- It's All About Amy – fly on the wall/reality television
- It's Me or the Dog – factual/reality
- It's Not What You Know – game show
- It's Only TV...but I Like It – panel game
- Ivanhoe – drama
- Ivor the Engine – children's

=== J ===
- Jack Whitehall: Travels with My Father – travel documentary, comedy
- Jackanory – children's
- The Jackson 5ive – animated
- Jakers! The Adventures of Piggley Winks – animated/children's
- Jam – sketch comedy
- Jamaica Inn – drama
- Jamie And The Magic Torch – children's
- James May's Things You Need To Know – science
- James May's Toy Stories – Documentary
- James the Cat – children's
- Jamie & Jimmy's Food Fight Club
- Jamie & Jimmy's Friday Night Feast – lifestyle
- Jamie at Home – cooking
- Jamie Does... – documentary
- Jamie: Keep Cooking and Carry On
- Jamie: Keep Cooking Family Favourites
- Jamie's 15-Minute Meals – food
- Jamie's 30-Minute Meals – cooking
- Jamie's American Road Trip – lifestyle
- Jamie's Chef – reality television
- Jamie's Comfort Food – lifestyle
- Jamie's Dream School – reality-documentary
- Jamie's Family Christmas – lifestyle
- Jamie's Great Britain – cooking
- Jamie's Great Italian Escape – cooking
- Jamie's Kitchen – documentary
- Jamie's Meat-Free Meals – lifestyle
- Jamie's Ministry of Food – reality
- Jamie's Money Saving Meals – cooking
- Jamie's Quick & Easy Food – lifestyle
- Jamie's School Dinners – documentary
- Jamie's Super Food – cooking
- Jamie's Super Food Family Classics
- Jane Eyre – drama
- Jane Hall – comedy drama
- Jango - comedy drama
- Japan: Earth's Enchanted Islands – nature documentary
- Jason King – crime fighter series
- Jeeves and Wooster – comedy drama
- Jekyll – drama
- Jekyll & Hyde – drama
- Jelly Jamm – animated
- Jenny's War – war
- Jeopardy! – game show
- Jericho (2005) – police drama
- Jericho (2016) – drama
- The Jeremy Kyle Show – talk show
- Jet Set – game show
- The Jewel in the Crown – drama/history/romance
- Jimbo and the Jet Set – children's
- Jim'll Fix It – entertainment
- Jinx – children's
- Jo Brand's Big Splash – stand-up comedy
- Jo's Boys – drama
- The Job Lot – comedy
- Joe 90 – children's
- Joking Apart – situation comedy
- Jon Richardson: Ultimate Worrier – comedy
- Jonathan Creek – comedy/crime drama
- Jonny Briggs – children's
- Joshua Jones – children's stop motion
- Jossy's Giants – children's
- Jude the Obscure
- Judge Rinder – court show
- Judge Romesh – comedy/court show
- Juke Box Jury – music
- Juliet Bravo – police drama
- Jumpers for Goalposts – situation comedy
- Jungle Junction – animated
- Jungle Run – adventure game show
- Junior Doctors: Your Life in Their Hands – reality television
- Junior MasterChef – cookery
- Junior Paramedics – factual/reality television
- The Jury – period drama
- Just for Laughs – comedy
- Just Good Friends – situation comedy
- Just Tattoo of Us – reality
- Just William – children's
- Just the Two of Us – reality television
- Justice (1974) – drama
- Justice (2011) – legal drama
- Justin Lee Collins: Good Times – comedy chat show
- Justin Lee Collins: Turning Japanese – documentary
- Justin's House – children's

=== K ===
- K-9 – science fiction/children's
- Kaleidoscope – light entertainment
- Kappatoo – children's
- Karaoke – drama
- Kate – drama
- Kate & Mim-Mim – children's
- Katie – reality television
- Katie Price's Mucky Mansion – reality television
- Katie Price: Nothing to Hide – documentary/reality television
- Kavanagh QC – drama
- Kazoops! – animated/children's
- Keep It in the Family (1971) – comedy
- Keep It in the Family (1980) – sitcom
- Keep It in the Family (2014) – game show
- Keeping Mum – situation comedy
- Keeping Up Appearances – situation comedy
- The Keith & Paddy Picture Show – comedy parody
- The Keith Barret Show – comedy/chat show
- The Keith Lemon Sketch Show – sketch show
- Keith Lemon's LemonAid – entertainment
- Keith Lemon's Very Brilliant World Tour – sketch comedy
- Kelly – talk/variety show
- The Kenny Everett Video Show – sketch comedy
- Kerching! – children's sitcom
- Keynotes – music/game show
- Kick Start – sport
- Kiddyzuzaa Land – children's
- Kids Say the Funniest Things – comedy
- Killer Net – thriller
- Killing Eve – thriller
- King Arthur's Disasters – animated cartoon
- The King Is Dead – comedy
- King Of The Castle – children's 1971
- King of the Nerds – reality competition
- King of the River – drama
- Kingdom – mystery/comedy drama
- The Kingdom – horror
- King Rollo – children's
- Kinvig – sci-fi/comedy
- Kipper the Dog – children's
- Kiss Me Kate – sitcom
- Kitchen Criminals – cookery
- Kitchen Millionaire – cookery
- Knightmare – children's game show
- The Knock – action/customs & excise drama
- Knowing Me Knowing You with Alan Partridge – situation comedy/satire
- The Koala Brothers – children's stop motion
- Kröd Mändoon and the Flaming Sword of Fire – comedy
- The Krypton Factor – game show
- The Kumars at No. 42 – comedy/talk show
- Kung Fu Dino Posse – children's/action/comedy
- KYTV – comedy

=== L ===
- L.A. 7 – sitcom/family entertainment
- Lab Rats – sitcom
- Ladette to Lady – reality
- Ladies of Letters – comedy
- Lady Audley's Secret
- The Lady Vanishes – mystery thriller
- The Lakes – romance drama
- Land Girls – drama
- Land of the Eagle – nature documentary
- Land of the Tiger – nature documentary
- Lark Rise to Candleford – period drama
- Last Chance to See – nature documentary
- The Last Detective – detective drama
- The Last Enemy – drama/thriller/mystery
- The Last Kingdom – action, history, romance; 2015–present
- The Last Leg – late-night chat show/news/political satire/sport (originally during the 2012 Paralympics and Olympics)
- Last Man Standing – reality
- The Last of the Mohicans – adventure drama
- Last of the Summer Wine – situation comedy
- The Last Place on Earth – drama
- The Last Song – sitcom
- Last Tango in Halifax – drama
- The Last Weekend – thriller
- The Late, Late Breakfast Show – entertainment
- Later with Jools Holland – music
- Lavender Castle – adventure/children's/fantasy/science fiction
- Law & Order: UK – police drama
- The Law of the Playground – broadcast
- LazyTown Extra – children's
- The League of Gentlemen – situation comedy
- A League of Their Own – comedy/panel game show
- Learn With Sooty – children's
- Leaving – sitcom
- Leave it to Charlie - sitcom
- Legends of Stand-up And Bernard Righton
- Legit – comedy
- Lego Masters – reality competition; 2017–present
- Lemon La Vida Loca – sitcom/mockumentary
- Lemur Street – nature/documentary/drama
- Lenny Henry in Pieces – stand-up comedy/sketch show
- The Lenny Henry Show – comedy sketches
- The Les Dawson Show – variety show
- Let Them Eat Cake – sitcom
- Let There Be Love – sitcom
- Let Your Heart Out – entertainment/talent show
- Let's Dance for Comic Relief – talent show
- Let's Get Gold – entertainment/sports
- Let's Play Darts – sports
- Letterland – children's
- Lewis – crime drama
- Lexx – science fiction
- The Liars – comedy/drama
- Life – nature documentary
- The Life and Crimes of William Palmer
- The Life and Loves of a She-Devil – drama
- Life Begins – drama
- Life in Cold Blood – nature documentary
- Life in Squares – drama
- Life in the Air – nature documentary
- Life in the Freezer – nature documentary
- Life in the Snow – nature documentary
- Life in the Undergrowth – nature documentary
- Life Is Wild – drama
- The Life of Birds – nature documentary
- A Life of Bliss – situation comedy
- The Life of Mammals – nature documentary
- Life of Riley – sitcom
- The Life of Rock with Brian Pern – comedy
- Life on Earth – factual (natural history)
- Life on Mars – police drama/sci-fi/fantasy
- Life Story – nature documentary
- Life With The Lyons – situation comedy
- Life's Too Short – sitcom/mockumentary
- Lifesense – nature documentary
- Light Lunch – talk show
- Lightfields – supernatural drama
- The Likeaballs – cartoon
- The Likely Lads – situation comedy
- Lillie – historical drama
- Lilies – drama
- Lily Allen and Friends – talk show
- Lily's Driftwood Bay – animation cartoon series
- The Limbo Connection
- Linda Green – comedy drama
- Line of Duty – crime/drama/thriller
- Lingo – game show
- The Link – quiz game show
- The Lion, the Witch and the Wardrobe
- Lip Service – drama
- Lipstick on Your Collar – romance/musical/comedy
- Liquid Television – anthology series
- Little Britain – comedy sketches
- Little Crackers – comedy/drama
- Little Dorrit – period drama
- Little Miss Jocelyn – sketch comedy
- Little Monsters (1998) – animated children's
- Little Monsters (2003) – game show
- Little Princess – children's
- Little Red Tractor – children's
- Little Robots – animation/children's
- Little Women (1950) – period drama
- Little Women (1958) – drama
- Little Women (1970) – drama
- Little Women (2017) – period drama
- Live at the Apollo – stand-up comedy
- Live TV Bingo – game show
- The Liver Birds – situation comedy
- Living Britain – nature documentary
- Living on the Edge – reality television
- The Living Planet – factual (natural history) / nature documentary
- Loaded – comedy drama
- Location, Location, Location – property show
- London – historical documentary
- London Bridge – soap opera
- London Ink – reality television
- London's Burning – drama
- Long Way Round – documentary
- Look Around You – spoof comedy
- Loose Women – talk show
- Lord Peter Wimsey – drama
- The Losers – sitcom
- Lost (UK) – reality television
- Lost in Austen – drama, fantasy, romance
- Lost Land of the Jaguar – nature documentary
- Lost Land of the Tiger – nature documentary
- Lost Land of the Volcano – nature documentary
- Lost Worlds, Vanished Lives – documentary
- The Lotus Eaters – drama
- Love and Marriage – comedy-drama
- Love for Lydia
- Love in a Cold Climate (1980) – drama
- Love in a Cold Climate (2001) – drama
- Love Island (2005) – reality
- Love Island (2015) – reality
- The Love Machine – game show
- Love on a Branch Line – drama comedy
- Love on a Saturday Night – game show
- Love Soup – comedy/drama
- Love Story
- Love Thy Neighbour (1972) – situation comedy
- Love Thy Neighbour (2011) – reality
- Lovejoy – drama
- The Lovers – comedy
- Low Winter Sun – crime drama
- Lucky Feller – sitcom
- Lucky Ladders – game show
- Lucky Numbers – game show
- Lucy Sullivan Is Getting Married – comedy
- Ludwig – children's animation
- Luna – children's/science fiction
- Luther – crime drama
- Luton Airport – documentary
- Luv – sitcom

=== M ===
- MacDonald's Farm – children's
- The Machine Gunners– children's historical fiction
- Maelstrom – drama
- The Mad Death – drama
- Mad About Alice – sitcom
- The Mad Bad Ad Show – comedy
- Mad Dogs – drama/thriller
- Mad for It – children's/game show
- Madagascar – nature documentary
- Madame Bovary – drama
- Made in Chelsea – reality television
- Made in Scotland – factual
- Maggie – children's
- Maggie and Her – comedy
- The Magic Key – children's
- The Magic Mirror – children's
- Magic Numbers – game show
- The Magic Roundabout – children's
- Magic with Everything – children's situation comedy
- The Magnificent Evans – situation comedy
- Magpie – children's
- Maid Marian and her Merry Men – situation comedy
- Maigret – drama
- Maigret – abc 1960–63 police drama
- Maigret – granada 1992 police drama
- The Main Chance – drama
- Maisie Raine – drama
- Maisy – children's animated
- Make 'Em Laugh: The Funny Business of America – comedy/documentary
- Make Me a Supermodel – fashion/reality
- Make Me Laugh – game show
- Make Way for Noddy – animated children's
- Make Your Play – phone-in quiz show
- Making Out – comedy drama
- Making Waves – drama
- Malice Aforethought (1981)
- Malice Aforethought (2005) – drama
- The Mallens – drama
- Mama Mirabelle's Home Movies – animated
- Mamma Mia! I Have a Dream – reality
- Man About the House – situation comedy/sitcom
- Man Alive – human interest
- Man Down – sitcom
- The Man from the Pru
- Man in a Suitcase – action drama
- Man O Man – game show
- Man on Earth – documentary
- Man to Man with Dean Learner – comedy (spoof)
- Man vs. Wild
- Manchild – comedy drama
- Mandog – children's
- Manhunt – Solving Britain's Crimes
- Mapp and Lucia – channel 4
- Mapp and Lucia – bbc
- Marcella – crime/drama/thriller
- Marchlands – supernatural drama
- Marion and Geoff – mockumentary/comedy drama
- Mark Wright's Hollywood Nights – reality television
- Market in Honey Lane – soap opera
- Market Kitchen – cookery
- Marley's Ghosts – sitcom
- Marriage Lines – sitcom
- The Marriage Ref – game show
- Married for Life – sitcom
- Mary, Mungo and Midge – children's
- Mary Berry Cooks – food/entertainment
- Mary Queen of Shops – documentary
- The Mary Whitehouse Experience – comedy/satire
- The Mask of Janus – drama
- The Masked Dancer – talent show
- The Masked Singer – talent show
- Massive – comedy
- The Masked Singer – singing talent show
- The Master Game – chess game
- MasterChef (UK) – competition cooking show
- MasterChef: The Professionals – competition cooking show
- Mastermind – quiz show
- Masterteam – radio quiz
- The Match – reality tv
- Match of the Day – sport
- Match of the Day Kickabout – children's
- Material Girl – romantic comedy
- Matt Hatter Chronicles – animated
- Max and Paddy's Road To Nowhere – situation comedy
- Max Headroom – science fiction/drama
- The Max Headroom Show – music/comedy/talk show
- May to December – situation comedy
- Mayday – drama thriller
- Mayo – comedy detective drama
- The Mayor of Casterbridge
- McCallum – police drama
- McMafia – crime drama
- Me Mammy – sitcom
- Medics – medical drama
- Meerkat Manor – nature documentary
- Meet the Parents – comedy/game show
- Meet the Wife – sitcom
- Mel and Sue – chat show
- Melissa
- Men Behaving Badly – situation comedy
- Merlin – fantasy drama
- The Mersey Pirate – children's
- Merseybeat – police drama
- Messiah – drama
- The Met: Policing London – factual/documentary
- Metal Mickey – children's
- Mexico: Earth's Festival of Life – nature documentary
- Miami 7 – sitcom/family entertainment
- Micawber – comedy/drama
- Michael McIntyre's Comedy Roadshow – stand-up comedy
- Micro Man – documentary drama
- Microscopic Milton – children's
- Mid Morning Matters with Alan Partridge – mockumentary sitcom/comedy
- Midas Touch – game show
- The Midnight Beast – sitcom
- Midnight Man – thriller
- Midsomer Murders – detective drama
- Miffy and Friends – animated
- Miffy's Adventures Big and Small – animated
- The Mighty Boosh – situation comedy
- M.I. High – children's drama
- Mike and Angelo – children's
- Mike the Knight – animated children's
- Mile High – drama
- Milkshake Monkey – children's
- The Mill – period drama
- The Million Pound Hoax
- The Million Pound Drop Live – game show/quiz show
- Millionaire Minor – game show
- Minipops – variety show
- Minder – drama/action
- A Mind to Kill – crime/drama
- Mind Your Language – comedy
- Mind the Gap: London vs the Rest – factual/documentary
- Mine All Mine – drama
- The Miniaturist – drama
- The Mint – quiz show
- The Mint Extra – quiz show
- Minty – children's/drama/comedy
- Minute to Win It – game show
- Mio Mao – children's
- The Miracle of Bali – documentary
- Miracles Take Longer – drama
- Miranda – situation comedy
- The Misadventures of Romesh Ranganathan – comedy travel
- The Misfit – sitcom
- Misfits – comedy/drama/fantasy
- Miss Marie Lloyd – Queen of The Music Hall – drama
- Miss Marple – detective drama
- Miss Morison's Ghosts – drama
- Miss Spider's Sunny Patch Friends – children's
- Missing (2006) – drama
- Missing (2009) – drama
- The Missing – drama
- Mission Implausible – reality television/game show
- Mister Eleven – drama
- Mister Maker – children's
- Mister Maker Around the World – children's
- Mister Maker at Home – children's
- Mister Maker Comes to Town – children's
- Mister Maker's Arty Party – children's
- The Mistress – sitcom
- Mistresses – serial drama
- Mixed Blessings – sitcom
- The Moaning of Life – comedy/travel documentary
- Mobile – drama
- Mock the Week – panel game
- Model Behaviour – reality
- Mog – comedy
- Mogul / The Troubleshooters – drama
- Molly's Gang – animated
- Monarch of the Glen – drama
- The Monastery – documentary
- The Mole – reality
- Monday Monday – comedy/drama
- Money – drama
- The Money Programme – factual
- Mongrels – sitcom/black comedy
- Monitor – arts
- Monkey – adventure/fantasy/comedy/drama
- Monkey Dust – animation/satire
- Monkey Life – documentary
- Monkey Planet – documentary
- Monkey Trousers – comedy/sketch comedy
- Monroe – medical drama
- Monty Python's Flying Circus – comedy sketches (1969–74)
- The Moomins – children's
- Moondial – TV serial
- The Moonstone (1959)
- The Moonstone (1972)
- The Moonstone (2016) – drama
- Mopatop's Shop — children's
- The Morecambe & Wise Show (1968) – comedy sketches
- The Morecambe & Wise Show (1978) – comedy sketches
- Morgan Spurlock's New Britannia – satire/talk show
- Morgana Robinson's The Agency – comedy/mockumentary
- Morning Exchange – news/talk show
- Morning Glory – breakfast television
- Moses – documentary
- Mother Love – drama
- Motherland – sitcom
- Mount Pleasant – comedy/drama
- Mountain – documentary
- Mountain: Life at the Extreme – nature documentary
- Mountain Gorilla – nature documentary
- Mouth to Mouth – comedy drama
- The Movie Game – children's/game show
- Moving – sitcom
- Moving On – drama
- Moving Wallpaper – comedy/drama
- Mr. Bean – situation comedy (1990–95)
- Mr. Bean (animated TV series) – animated comedy (2002–04)
- Mr. Benn – children's
- Mr. Men and Little Miss – children's
- The Mr. Men Show – animated/children's
- Mr and Mrs – game show
- Mr Bloom's Nursery – children's
- Mr Moon – animated/children's
- Mr Selfridge – drama
- The Mrs. Bradley Mysteries – crime drama
- Mrs. Brown's Boys – sitcom
- Mud – children's
- Muffin the Mule – children's
- Mulberry – sitcom
- Multi-Coloured Swap Shop – children's
- Mum – sitcom
- The Muppet Show – puppetry/sketch comedy
- Murder City – police drama
- The Murder Game – reality
- Murder in Eden – drama
- Murder in Mind – police drama
- Murder in Successville – sitcom
- Murder Must Advertise
- Murder Prevention – police drama
- Murder Rooms – police drama
- Murder Rooms: The Dark Beginnings of Sherlock Holmes – drama
- Murderland – mystery drama
- Murphy's Law – police drama
- Museum of Life – documentary
- The Musketeers – era adventure
- Must Be the Music – reality television
- My Autism and Me – autism/documentary
- My Cousin Rachel
- My Dad's the Prime Minister – children's comedy
- My Family – situation comedy
- My Fragile Heart – crime drama
- My Good Friend – sitcom
- My Hero – situation comedy
- My Life as an Animal – documentary
- My Life As A College Student – comedy drama/reality
- My Life As A College Student 2: The Adventure Continues – comedy drama / reality / sitcom
- My Life As A College Student 3: The Final Chapter – comedy drama / reality / sitcom
- My Mad Fat Diary – comedy drama
- My New Best Friend – game show
- My Shocking Story – documentary
- My Spy Family – sitcom
- Mystery! – anthology, mystery
- Mystery and Imagination - supernatural

=== N ===
- The Naked Chef – cooking
- Naked Jungle – game show
- The Naked Pilgrim – documentary
- Name That Tune – game show
- Nanny – drama
- Nathan Barley – situation comedy
- The National Lottery: In It to Win It – game show
- The National Lottery Draws
- Nationwide – news
- The Nativity – drama
- Natural World – nature documentary
- The Nature of Britain – nature documentary
- Nature's Epic Journeys – nature documentary
- Nature's Great Events – nature documentary
- Nature's Greatest Dancers – nature documentary
- Nature's Microworlds – nature documentary
- Nature's Wonderlands – nature documentary
- N.C.I. National Crime Squad – police drama
- Nearly Famous – drama
- Neighbours Revealed – documentary
- The Nest – thriller
- Never Mind the Buzzcocks – panel game
- Never Mind the Full Stops – game show
- Never Mind the Quality, Feel the Width – situation comedy
- Never the Twain – situation comedy
- Neverwhere – fantasy
- The New Avengers – action
- New Captain Scarlet – action-adventure
- New Faces – talent show
- The New Statesman – situation comedy
- New Street Law – legal drama
- New Tricks – police drama
- The New Worst Witch – children's fantasy/magic
- New Zealand: Earth's Mythical Islands – nature documentary
- The Newcomers – soap opera
- Newlyweds – game show
- Newsnight – current affairs
- Newsround – children's news
- Newswipe with Charlie Brooker – review
- Next of Kin – sitcom
- Nick Kicks – sports/comedy
- Night and Day – soap opera/drama
- Night Fever – music/game show
- The Night Manager – crime, drama, mystery 2016 mini series
- The Night Of – crime, drama
- Nighty Night – black situation comedy
- Nile – documentary film
- Nina and the Neurons – children's
- The Nine Tailors
- Nini's Treehouse – children's
- Ninja Warrior UK – game show
- Noel's House Party – entertainment
- The No. 1 Ladies' Detective Agency – comedy-drama
- No Angels – medical situation comedy
- No Heroics – superhero-comedy
- No Hiding Place – police drama
- No Limits – music
- No Problem! – comedy
- No Strings – sitcom
- Noah's Ark – family
- Noddy (1975) – children's
- Noddy (1998) – children's/fantasy
- Noddy, Toyland Detective – children's
- Noddy in Toyland – children's
- Noddy's Toyland Adventures – children's
- Noel's HQ – family entertainment
- The Noise – magazine
- North and South – period drama
- Northern Lights – dramedy
- Nortonland – clip show
- Not Going Out – situation comedy
- Not Only... But Also – sketch comedy
- Not So Much a Programme, More a Way of Life – satire
- Not the Nine O'Clock News – comedy/satire
- Nothing But the Truth – game show
- Notorious Woman – drama
- Now You See It – game show
- Numberblocks – children's/animated
- Nurse – sitcom
- NY-LON – drama

=== O ===
- Oasis – short drama
- Occupation – war drama
- Ocean Giants – nature documentary
- The Octonauts – children's/animated
- Octonauts: Above & Beyond – children's/animated
- Odd One In – comedy/game show
- Odd Man Out – sitcom
- The Office – situation comedy (2001–03)
- Offside – comedy
- Oh, Brother! – situation comedy
- Oh, Doctor Beeching! – situation comedy
- Oh Boy! – music/variety
- Oh Happy Band! – sitcom
- Oh No, It's Selwyn Froggitt! – situation comedy
- Old Bear Stories – animated
- The Old Grey Whistle Test – music
- The Old Guys – sitcom
- Oliver Twist – drama
- Oliver's Travels – drama
- Oliver's Twist – cooking
- Olivia – children's/animated
- Olympus – fantasy/mythological
- The Omega Factor – science fiction
- On Safari – wildlife
- On the Buses – situation comedy
- On the Spot – game show
- On the Up – situation comedy
- The One and Only – entertainment/music
- One Foot in the Grave – situation comedy
- The One Game – drama serial
- One Man and his Dog – competition
- One of Us – drama
- The One Show – factual
- The Onedin Line – drama
- Only Connect – Quiz Show
- Only Fools and Horses – situation comedy
- Only Fools on Horses
- The Only Way Is Essex – reality television/dramality
- Only When I Laugh – sitcom
- OOglies – children's
- Ordinary Lies – drama
- Orphan Black – action drama
- Open a Door – children's
- Open All Hours – situation comedy
- Open House
- Open House with Gloria Hunniford – lifestyle
- Open University – education
- Opinions – lectures
- Opportunity Knocks – talent contest
- Orange Playlist – music show
- Orangutan Diary – nature documentary
- Oscar's Orchestra – children's/animated
- Oswald – children's
- Our Friends in the North – drama
- Our Mutual Friend (1958) – drama
- Our Mutual Friend (1976) – drama
- Our Mutual Friend (1998) – drama
- Our Planet – nature documentary
- Our Zoo – drama
- Out of the Blue (1995) – police drama
- Out of the Blue (2008) – serial drama
- Out of the Unknown – science fiction
- Out of Town – fishing
- Outcasts – science-fiction drama
- Outlander – drama/adventure/fantasy/romance
- Outnumbered – situation comedy
- Outside Edge – situation comedy
- OutTHERE – clip show (2001–2003)
- Over the Rainbow – reality/talent show
- Owen M.D – medical drama 1972

=== P ===
- PB Bear and Friends – children's
- Pablo the Little Red Fox – animated
- Pacific Abyss – nature documentary
- Paddington – animated
- Paddington Bear – animated
- Painted Lady – drama, murder mystery
- The Palace – drama
- Panorama – current affairs
- The Paper Lads – children's
- Parade's End – period drama
- The Paradise – drama
- Paradox – Science fiction
- Parallel 9 – children's entertainment
- Paranoid – crime drama
- Parents – sitcom
- Paris – sitcom
- Paris Hilton's British Best Friend – reality television
- Park Avenue – soap opera
- Parkinson – talk show
- Parnell and the Englishwoman – drama
- Party Animals – drama
- The Passion – drama
- The Passions of Girls Aloud – reality television
- Patagonia: Earth's Secret Paradise – nature documentary
- Patrick Melrose – drama
- The Paul Daniels Magic Show – magic show
- Paul Merton in China – comedy
- Paul Merton in Europe – comedy
- Paul Merton in India – comedy
- Paul Merton's Adventures – comedy
- Paul Temple – detective drama
- Pauline's Quirkes – comedy
- The Paz Show – animated
- Peak Practice – drama
- Peaky Blinders – crime drama
- Pebble Mill – magazine
- Peep Show – point of view situation comedy
- Pennies from Heaven – musical drama
- Penny Dreadful – drama/thriller/horror
- Percy the Park Keeper – children's show
- People Just Do Nothing – mockumentary
- People Like Us – mockumentary
- The People of Paradise – documentary
- The People Versus – game show
- The People's Book of Records – comedy/game show
- The People's Quiz – game show
- Peppa Pig – children's
- A Perfect Hero – drama
- Perfect World – comedy
- Personal Affairs – drama
- The Persuaders! – drama/action
- Peter Kay's Phoenix Nights – situation comedy
- Peter Rabbit – animated
- Petrolheads – game show
- Philip K. Dick's Electric Dreams – science fiction
- PhoneShop – sitcom
- Pib and Pog
- Picture Page – magazine programme
- Pie in the Sky – drama/comedy
- Piece of Cake – drama
- The Piglet Files – sitcom
- Pilgrim's Rest – sitcom
- The Pillars of the Earth – historical drama
- Pimp My Ride (UK) – reality television
- Pingu – children's
- Pinky Malinky – mockumentary/surreal comedy
- Pinwright's Progress – situation comedy
- Pip Ahoy! – children's animated
- The Pit – music video/documentary/news
- Pitt & Kantrop – children's
- The Plane Makers/The Power Game – drama
- Planet Dinosaur – documentary
- Planet Earth – nature documentary
- Planet Earth II – nature documentary
- Planet Earth: The Future – nature documentary
- Planet Earth Live – nature documentary
- Planet Sketch – animated/comedy
- Play Away – children's
- Play for Today – drama anthology
- The Play on One – drama anthology
- Play School – children's
- Play Your Cards Right – game show
- Playbox (1955) – children's
- Playbox (1987) – children's
- Playdate – dating show
- Playdays – children's
- Playing the Field – drama
- Please Sir! – sitcom
- Plus One – sitcom
- Pob's Programme – children's
- Pocoyo – animated
- Pogles' Wood – animated
- Point Counter Point
- Pointless – game show
- PokerFace – game show
- Poldark (1975) – historical drama
- Poldark (2015) – drama
- The Polar Bear Family & Me – nature documentary
- Police Camera Action! – documentary/reality television
- Police Interceptors – documentary
- Police Stop! – documentary/reality television
- Police Surgeon – drama
- Pompidou – comedy
- Pop Idol – talent show/reality
- The Pop Years – documentary
- Poppy Cat – animated
- Popstars (UK) – talent show
- Popstars: The Rivals – talent show
- Popworld – music
- Porkpie – sitcom
- Porno Valley – documentary
- Pororo the Little Penguin – children's
- Porridge (1974) – situation comedy
- Porridge (2016) – sitcom
- Portrait of a Marriage – period drama
- Porterhouse Blue – drama
- Portland Bill – children's
- Posh Pawn – documentary
- The Possessed
- Postcode Challenge – game show
- Postman Pat – children's
- Postman Pat Special Delivery Service – children's
- Pot Black – sport (snooker)
- Potsworth & Co – children's/animated
- Potter – sitcom
- The Power – thriller drama
- Power Lunch Europe – news
- Powers – science fiction
- The Practice – soap opera
- Pramface – sitcom
- Prank Patrol – hidden camera
- Praying Mantis
- Prehistoric Park – science fiction/docu-fiction
- PREMature – mini series
- Press Gang – children's
- Preston Pig – children's
- Prey – crime thriller
- The Price Is Right – game show
- Priceless Antiques Roadshow – factual
- Prickly Heat – game show
- Pride and Prejudice (1958) – drama
- Pride and Prejudice (1967) – drama
- Pride and Prejudice (1980) – drama
- Pride and Prejudice (1995) – drama
- Prime Suspect – police drama
- Prime Suspect 1973 – detective drama
- Primeval – science fiction
- The Princess Diaries – reality documentary
- Princess Nikki – reality television
- The Prisoner (1967) – science fiction
- The Prisoner (2009)
- Prisoners' Wives – drama
- The Private Life of Plants – nature documentary
- Private Schulz – comedy drama
- Prize Island – quiz show
- Project Catwalk – reality/competition
- The Professionals – drama/action
- The Promise – drama/period drama
- Property Ladder – entertainment
- Prospects – comedy drama
- The Protectors – drama/action
- Psychobitches – sketch show
- Psychoville – sitcom/horror
- Psychos – drama
- Public Enemies – drama
- Public Eye – detective drama
- Pulling – situation comedy
- Puzzle Party – children's
- The Pyramid Game – game show

=== Q ===
- QI – panel game
- Quatermass – science fiction serial
- Quatermass and the Pit – science fiction serial
- The Quatermass Experiment – science fiction
- Quatermass II – science fiction serial
- Quayside – soap opera
- The Queen's Nose – children's drama
- Queer as Folk – drama
- A Question of Sport – panel game
- Question Time – factual/politics
- Questions for the Future – debate
- Quiet as a Nun – drama
- Quiz Call – quiz show
- Quizmania – game show
- Quiznation – game show

=== R ===
- RI:SE – breakfast television
- Rab C. Nesbitt – situation comedy
- The Race – reality television/game show
- The Racing Game
- The Rag Trade – situation comedy
- Ragdolly Anna – children's
- Rainbow – children's
- Ramsay's Kitchen Nightmares – reality television
- Randall and Hopkirk (Deceased) – comedy/drama
- Randy Cunningham: 9th Grade Ninja – animated/action
- Rank the Prank – hidden camera game show
- Rastamouse – children's
- Raven – children's adventure game show
- Razzledazzle – children's
- Ready Steady Cook – cooking show
- Ready Steady Go! – pop music show
- The Real Football Fan Show – football talk show
- The Real Housewives of Cheshire – reality television
- The Real Hustle – reality/documentary/crime
- Real Men – crime drama
- The Really Wild Show – wildfire
- Rebecca – drama miniseries
- The Rebel – comedy
- Rebus – police drama
- Reckless – serial drama
- Record Breakers – children's
- Red Alert – game show
- Red Dwarf – situation comedy
- Red or Black? – game show
- Redwall – animated
- Regency House Party – historical/reality
- The Regiment – historical drama
- Reilly, Ace of Spies – drama
- Rellik – crime
- Remember Me – drama
- Rentaghost – children's
- Rescue Me – romantic comedy
- Respect – multicultural sports
- The Restaurant – reality television
- The Restoration Man – home improvement
- Resurrection
- Return of the Saint – action drama
- Return to Cranford – comedy drama
- Return to Jamie's Kitchen – documentary
- Rev. – sitcom
- Revelations – soap opera
- Rex the Runt – animated
- Richard Bacon's Beer & Pizza Club – comedy panel show
- Richard Hammond's Blast Lab – children's game show
- Richard Hammond's Crash Course – factual (with comical elements)
- Richard Hammond's Engineering Connections – factual (with comical elements)
- Richard Osman's House of Games – quiz show
- Rip Off Britain – factual
- Ripper Street – drama
- Ripping Yarns – comedy
- Rising Damp – situation comedy
- The River – sitcom
- River City – soap opera
- Road Raja – reality television
- Road Wars – reality television
- Roar – children's
- Roary the Racing Car – animated children's
- The Rob Brydon Show – chat show
- Robbie – travel
- Robin Hood – drama/adventure
- Robin of Sherwood – adventure
- Robin's Nest – situation comedy/sitcom
- Robotboy – children's/animated/sci-fi/action/adventure/comedy
- Robot Wars – game show
- Robson Green's Wild Swimming Adventure
- Rock & Chips – comedy/drama
- Rock Follies – musical drama
- Rock Profile – comedy
- Rock School – reality/documentary
- Rocket Man – drama
- Rocket's Island – fantasy/adventure/mystery
- Rocky Hollow – children's stop motion
- Roger & Val Have Just Got In – bittersweet sitcom
- Roger Roger – comedy/drama
- Rogue – police drama
- Roman Mysteries – adventure/children's/action
- Roman's Empire – comedy
- Romany Jones – sitcom
- Rome – historical drama
- Roobarb – animated
- Room 101 – comedy/talk gameshow
- Room Service - sitcom
- Root Into Europe – comedy/drama
- Rosemary & Thyme – detective drama/crime fiction
- Rosie – situation comedy
- Rosie and Jim – children's
- Ross Kemp: Back on the Frontline – documentary
- Ross Kemp: Battle for the Amazon – documentary
- Ross Kemp: Extreme World – documentary
- Ross Kemp: Middle East – documentary
- Ross Kemp in Afghanistan – documentary
- Ross Kemp in Search of Pirates – documentary
- Ross Kemp on Gangs – documentary
- Rough Justice – current affairs/documentary
- Rownd a Rownd – soap opera
- The Royal – period/medical drama
- The Royal Today – medical drama/soap opera
- The Royle Family – situation comedy
- Rubbadubbers – children's
- Rude Tube – clip show
- Rugrats Pre-School Daze – animation
- Rumpole of the Bailey – drama
- Runaround – children's game show
- Runaway
- The Runaway – drama
- Running Wild – comedy sketch show
- RuPaul's Drag Race UK – reality television
- RuPaul's Drag Race: UK vs. the World – reality television
- Rupert Bear, Follow the Magic... – children's
- Rush Hour – sketch comedy
- Russell Howard's Good News – comedy/topical stand up
- The Ruth Rendell Mysteries – mystery drama
- Rutland Weekend Television – comedy sketches

=== S ===
- S Club 7 Go Wild! – reality/children's
- S Club Search – reality/children's
- Safebreakers – game show
- The Saint – drama/action (1962–1969)
- Sale of the Century – game show
- The Sally Lockhart Mysteries: The Ruby in the Smoke
- The Sally Lockhart Mysteries: The Shadow in the North
- The Sally Lockhart Mysteries: The Tiger in the Well
- The Sally Lockhart Mysteries: The Tin Princess
- Sally4Ever – comedy
- The Salon – reality television
- Sam – family drama
- Sam's Game – sitcom
- The Sandbaggers – spy drama
- Sapphire and Steel – science fiction
- Saracen – action/drama
- Sarah & Duck – animated children's
- The Sarah Jane Adventures – science fiction/teen drama
- Sarah Jane's Alien Files – science fiction/drama
- Satellite City – sitcom
- Saturday Cookbook – culinary
- Saturday Kitchen – cookery
- Saturday Live – comedy
- The Saturday Night Armistice – comedy
- The Savages – sitcom
- Save Me – drama
- Saving Planet Earth – nature documentary
- Saxondale – sitcom
- Say It with Noddy – children's
- The Scheme – documentary
- Scott & Bailey – drama
- Scrapheap Challenge – game show
- Scream! If You Know the Answer – game show
- Screaming – sitcom
- Screen One – drama anthology
- Screen Two – drama anthology
- ScreenPlay – drama anthology
- The Sculptress
- Sea Monsters – documentary
- Sea of Faith – documentary
- Sea of Souls – supernatural drama
- Sea Patrol UK – documentary
- Sea Princesses – children's
- Sea Trek – nature documentary
- The Search – game show
- Searching – sitcom
- A Seaside Parish – documentary
- The Second Coming – drama/supernatural
- Second Sight – crime drama
- Second Thoughts – comedy
- The Secret Adventures of Jules Verne – science fiction
- The Secret Life of Elephants – nature documentary
- Secret Army – historical drama
- The Secret Cabaret – magic and illusion
- Secret Dealers – game show
- Secret Diary of a Call Girl – drama
- The Secret Diary of Adrian Mole – comedy-drama
- Secret Fortune – game show
- The Secret Garden – children's drama
- The Secret Millionaire – reality television
- The Secret Service – children's
- The Secret Show – action/espionage/children's
- Secrets and Words – drama
- Secrets of Great British Castles – documentary
- Secrets of the Dead – documentary
- Sell Me the Answer – game show
- Sense and Sensibility (1971) – drama
- Sense and Sensibility (1981) – drama
- Sense and Sensibility (2008) – drama
- Sensitive Skin – comedy
- Sergeant Cork – police drama
- Sergeant Stripes – children's
- Serious – children's/reality television/adventure
- Seven Ages of Rock – music documentary
- Seven of One – comedy
- Seven Worlds, One Planet – nature documentary
- Sex, Chips & Rock n' Roll – drama
- Sex Education – comedy drama
- Shades of Darkness
- The Shadow Line – drama
- Shadows – children's supernatural
- Shafted – quiz show
- Shameless – comedy drama
- Shark – nature documentary
- The Sharon Osbourne Show – talk show
- A Sharp Intake of Breath – sitcom
- Shaun the Sheep – stop-motion animated
- She Fell Among Thieves (TV film)
- Shelley – situation comedy
- Sherlock – crime drama (2010–2017)
- Sherlock Holmes in the 22nd Century – action / crime / science fiction
- Shillingbury Tales – light drama
- Shine on Harvey Moon – comedy drama
- Shock Treatment – reality television
- Shoebox Zoo – fantasy/children's
- Shoestring – detective drama
- Shooting Stars – panel game
- Shoulder to Shoulder – drama
- Show Me Show Me – children's
- Show Me the Money – game show
- Showboaters – reality television
- Shrink Rap – talk show
- Silent Witness – police drama/crime drama
- The Silence – thriller/drama
- Silk – legal/crime drama
- Simply the Best – sports game show
- Sin Cities – sexually-oriented travel
- Sinchronicity – drama
- Sing It Back: Lyric Champion – karaoke game show
- The Singing Detective – musical drama
- Simon and the Witch – children's drama
- Simon in the Land of Chalk Drawings – children's
- The Simpleton Life – reality
- Sinbad – action/adventure/fantasy/family saga
- Sing If You Can – game show
- Single Father – drama
- Singled Out – game show
- Singles – sitcom
- Sirens – comedy drama
- Sitting Pretty – sitcom
- The Six Wives of Henry VIII (1970) – historical drama
- The Six Wives of Henry VIII (2001) – documentary
- Six-Five Special – music
- Sixpenny Corner – soap drama
- Skatoony – game show/animated/comedy
- The Sketch Show – sketch comedy
- Skin – documentary
- Skins – teenage drama
- Skunk Fu! – animated
- Sky – children's science fiction
- The Sky at Night – factual (astronomy)
- Sky Cops – crime
- Slave Market – drama
- Sleepers – drama
- Slinger's Day – sitcom
- Smack the Pony – sketch comedy
- Small Axe – anthology
- Small Island – drama
- Small Potatoes – children's/animated
- SMart – children's art
- SMart on the Road – children's art
- SMarteenies – children's art
- The Smell of Reeves and Mortimer – sketch comedy
- Smile – children's
- The Smoke – drama
- Smuggler – children's drama
- Snowflake Mountain – reality show
- Snuff Box – sketch comedy
- So Graham Norton – chat show
- So You Think You Can Dance – reality show
- Soapstars – reality show
- Softly, Softly – police drama
- Sold – comedy
- Soldier And Me – children's crime drama
- Soldier Soldier – military drama
- Solo – sitcom
- Some Girls – sitcom/comedy
- Some Mothers Do 'Ave 'Em – situation comedy
- Something for the Weekend – game show
- Something for the Weekend – cookery/chat show
- Son of God – documentary/factual
- Songs of Praise – religious
- Sons and Lovers (1981) – drama
- Sons and Lovers (2003)
- Sooty (2001) – children's
- Sooty (2011) – children's
- Sooty & Co. – children's
- Sooty Heights – children's
- The Sooty Show – children's
- Sooty's Amazing Adventures – children's
- Sooty's Magic – children's
- Sorry! – sitcom
- Sorry I'm Single – sitcom
- Sorted – drama
- The South Bank Show – arts
- South Pacific – nature documentary
- South Riding – period drama
- Space: 1999 – science fiction
- Space Cadets – reality television/spoof
- Space Island One – science fiction/drama
- Space Precinct – police drama/science fiction
- Spaced – alternative situation comedy (1999–2001)
- The Spanish Princess – drama
- Sparkhouse – drama
- Special Branch – police drama
- Spellbound – game show
- The Spies – drama
- Spin Star – quiz show
- Spirits of the Jaguar – nature documentary
- Spitting Image – comedy/satire
- Splash! – reality television
- Splatalot! – comedy game show
- The Spoils of Poynton
- Spooks – spy drama
- Spooks: Code 9 – spy drama
- Spooks of Bottle Bay – children's
- Spoons – sketch comedy
- Sports Review – sport
- Sportsview – sport
- Sportsnight – sport
- Spot the Dog – animated
- Springhill – soap opera/drama
- Springwatch
- Spy (2004) – reality television
- Spy (2011) – sitcom
- Spy in the Wild – nature documentary
- The Spy Machine – documentary
- Spycatcher – drama
- Squawk Box Europe – news
- The Squirrels – sitcom
- Stag – black comedy
- Stanley and the Women – drama
- Star Cops – science fiction
- Star Maidens – science fiction
- Star Spell – game show
- Star Stories – comedy
- Star Test – chat show
- Starhill Ponies – animated
- Stark – drama
- Starlight – variety
- Starlings – comedy drama
- Starr and Company – drama
- Stars in Their Eyes – talent show
- The Stars Look Down – drama
- The State – drama
- State of Play – drama
- State of the Planet – documentary
- The State Within – thriller
- Staying Alive – medical drama
- Stella – comedy drama
- Stella Street – comedy
- Step Inside – children's
- Stephen Brown – science fiction
- Stephen Fry: Out There – documentary
- Stephen Fry in America – travel
- Steptoe and Son – situation comedy
- Stewart Lee's Comedy Vehicle – comedy
- Still Game – comedy
- Still Open All Hours – sitcom
- Stingray – science fiction
- Stone Cold
- Stories of the Sylvanian Families – children's
- The Story Makers – children's/creative
- The Story of Tracy Beaker – children's/comedy-drama
- Storytime – children's
- Strange – drama/horror thriller
- Strange Experiences - supernatural
- Strange Hill High – children's
- Strange Report – drama
- Stranger on the Shore – children's drama
- Strangers – detective series 70s
- Strangers and Brothers - drama
- The Strangerers – science fiction/comedy drama
- Strathblair – drama
- The Strauss Family – drama
- The Street – drama
- Street Crime UK – docusoap/police
- Stressed Eric – dark comedy, animation
- Strike Back – action, drama, thriller (2010–2015)
- Strictly Come Dancing – talent show
- Strictly Come Dancing: It Takes Two – entertainment
- Strictly Money – news
- Street Wars – reality
- Strike Back – drama/action/military
- Striker – children's drama football 1976
- Styled to Rock – reality
- Suburban Shootout – sitcom
- Sugar and Spice
- Sugar Rush – drama
- Summerhill – children's drama
- Summerton Mill – children's
- Sunburn – comedy drama
- Sunday Brunch – cookery/chat show
- Sunday Feast – cookery
- Sunday Night at the London Palladium – variety
- The Sunday Night Project – comedy/variety show
- Sunny Day – animated
- Sunset Song – drama
- Supergran – children's
- Supernanny – reality television
- Supernatural – horror
- Supernatural: The Unseen Powers of Animals – nature documentary
- Supernova – sitcom
- Supersense – nature documentary
- Superstar – reality/talent show
- Superstars – sports competition
- Surprise Surprise – light entertainment
- Survival – nature documentary
- Survivor – reality game show
- Survivors – science fiction
- Survivors – drama
- Suspects – police procedural
- Suspicion (2003) – drama thriller
- Suspicion (2022) – drama thriller
- Sutherland's Law – drama
- The Sweeney – police drama
- Sweeney Todd
- Sweet Medicine – drama
- Swiss Toni – sitcom
- Sykes – situation comedy
- Sykes and A... – situation comedy
- Sykes and a Big, Big Show – situation comedy/sketch show
- The Syndicate – drama

=== T ===
- T-Bag – children's
- Taboo – drama
- Taff Acre – soap opera
- Taggart – police drama
- The Take – drama
- Take a Letter – game show
- Take a Letter, Mr. Jones – sitcom
- Take Hart – children's art show
- Take Me Out – game show
- Take the High Road – soap opera
- Take Your Pick! – game show
- Takeover Bid – game show
- Tales of the Unexpected – drama/horror – adaptations of Roald Dahl stories
- Talk to Me – drama
- Talking Heads – drama
- Talking Telephone Numbers – game show
- Talking Threads – Country Channel, reality
- Tarby's Frame Game – game show
- Target – police drama
- Taskmaster – comedy/panel game
- Taste – cookery
- The Taste – cooking
- Teachers – drama
- The Teacher – drama
- Tee and Mo – children's
- Teen Big Brother: The Experiment – reality
- Telecrime – crime drama
- Teletubbies – children's
- Tell the Truth – panel game show
- Temptation Island UK – reality television
- Ten Pound Poms – historical drama
- Tender Is the Night
- Tenko – historical drama
- Tess of the D'Urbervilles – drama
- Testament of Youth – drama
- Thailand: Earth's Tropical Paradise – nature documentary
- Thank God You're Here – comedy
- That Mitchell and Webb Look – comedy/sketch show
- That Sunday Night Show – chat show/panel show
- That Was The Team That Was – sports documentary
- That Was the Week That Was – comedy/satire
- That's Life! – magazine-style TV series
- That's the Question – game show
- Theatre 625 – drama anthology
- Theatre Parade – excerpts from London shows
- Thérèse Raquin
- They Think It's All Over – panel game
- There's Nothing to Worry About! – comedy sketch show
- There's Something About Megan – music
- There's Something About Miriam – reality television
- The Thick of It – sitcom/satire
- Thief Takers – crime drama
- Thieves Like Us – sitcom
- The Thin Blue Line – sitcom
- Thin Ice – sitcom
- The Third Eye – drama
- This is Jinsy – surreal comedy/sitcom
- This is England – 30somethingish drama
- This Is Your Life – documentary/biography
- This Life – drama
- This Time Tomorrow – game show
- This Time with Alan Partridge – comedy
- This Week – current affairs (on ITV)
- This Week – political affairs (on BBC)
- Thomas & Friends – children's
- Thorne – police drama
- Threesome – comedy
- Three of a Kind – comedy sketch show
- Three Up, Two Down – comedy
- Through the Keyhole – comedy/panel game show
- Thunderbirds – science fiction
- Tickety Toc – children's/animated
- Tickle, Patch and Friends – animated
- Tikkabilla – children's
- Till Death... – situation comedy
- Till Death Us Do Part – situation comedy
- Time Gentlemen Please – situation comedy
- Time of Our Lives – sport interview series
- Time Team – history
- Time Trumpet – comedy/mockumentary
- Timeslip – science fiction
- Timmy Time – children's/animated
- Tinga Tinga Tales – children's/animated
- Tiny Planets – children's
- Tipping Point – quiz show
- Tiswas – children's
- Titch – children's
- Tittybangbang – comedy sketches
- TLC – sitcom
- TNA British Boot Camp
- To Me... To You... – children's
- To Play the King – drama
- To the Ends of the Earth – drama
- To the Manor Born – situation comedy
- Toast of London – comedy
- Today's Business – news/talk show
- Today's the Day – game show
- Tofu – documentary
- Together – soap opera
- Tom, Dick and Harriet – sitcom
- Tom Brown's Schooldays – drama
- Tommy Zoom – children's
- The Tomorrow People – science fiction
- Tomorrow's World – factual
- Tonight – news / current affairs
- Tony Bennett at the Talk of the Town – music
- Tony Robinson's Crime and Punishment – documentary
- Too Hot to Handle – reality television/game show
- Toot the Tiny Tugboat – children's
- Top Boy – crime drama
- Top Buzzer – sitcom
- Top Gear (1977) – factual (with comical elements)
- Top Gear (2002) – factual (with comical elements)
- Top Gear Live – factual (with comical elements)
- Top Ground Gear Force – factual (with comical elements)
- Top of the Pops – music
- Topsy and Tim – children's
- Torchwood – science fiction
- Torchwood Declassified – documentary/science fiction
- Torn – drama/thriller
- Total Wipeout – game show
- Totally Senseless – comedy game show
- Tots TV – children's
- A Touch of Cloth – comedy/police procedural
- A Touch of Frost – police drama
- Touching Evil – crime drama
- Towser – children's
- Toytown – children's
- Tracey Ullman's Show – sketch comedy
- Tractor Tom – children's
- Tracy Beaker Returns – children's/comedy-drama
- Tracy Beaker Survival Files – children's/comedy-drama
- Traffic Cops – motoring/police documentary
- Traffik – drime/crama
- Trainer – drama
- Travel Man – travel documentary
- Trawlermen – factual/documentary
- Treasure Hunt – game show
- Tree Fu Tom – children's
- Trevor's World of Sport – situation comedy
- Trial & Retribution – crime drama
- Trial by Fire
- The Trials of Life – nature documentary
- The Triangle – science fiction
- Triangle – drama/soap opera
- The Tribal Eye – documentary
- The Tribe – reality/documentary
- Tribes, Predators & Me – nature documentary
- Trick or Treat – game show
- Trigger Happy TV – hidden camera stunts
- The Trip – sitcom
- The Tripods – science fiction
- Tripper's Day – comedy
- Tripping Over – drama
- The Trisha Goddard Show – talk show
- Trivial Pursuit – game show
- Trollied – sitcom
- Tronji – children's
- Troy – magic show
- Truckers – drama
- True Dare Kiss – drama
- True Love – drama
- Trump: An American Dream – documentary
- Trust – legal drama
- Trust Me – drama
- Trust Me – I'm a Beauty Therapist – reality television
- Trying – comedy
- The Tube – music
- Tube Mice – children's
- Tugs – children's
- Tucker's Luck
- The Tudors – historical drama
- The Tunnel – crime drama
- Tutankhamun – adventure drama
- Tweenies – children's
- Twenty Twelve – comedy
- Twirlywoos – children's
- Two Doors Down – sitcom
- Two Fat Ladies – cooking
- Two Pints of Lager and a Packet of Crisps – situation comedy
- Two of a Kind – sketch show
- The Two of Us – situation comedy
- The Two Ronnies – comedy
- Two's Company – situation comedy
- TV Heaven, Telly Hell – comedy/talk show
- TV Scrabble – game show
- TVGoHome – comedy/sketch show
- Tycoon – reality television

=== U ===
- UGetMe – comedy/drama
- UFO – science fiction
- Ultimate Force – action/drama
- Ultraviolet – horror
- Unanimous – game show
- Unanimous: The Fallout – game show
- Uncovered – documentary
- Uncle – sitcom
- Undercover (2015) – comedy drama
- Undercover (2016) – drama
- Undercover Boss – reality television
- Underground Ernie – children's
- The Unforgettable – documentary
- Unforgiven – drama
- Unforgotten – crime drama
- United! – drama
- University Challenge – game show
- Unnatural Histories – documentary
- Unnovations – comedy
- The Unpleasantness at the Bellona Club
- Unspun with Matt Forde – satire
- An Unsuitable Job for a Woman – drama
- Untamed China with Nigel Marven – nature documentary
- Up the Elephant and Round the Castle – sitcom
- Up Pompeii! – situation comedy
- The Upper Hand – sitcom
- Upstairs, Downstairs (1971) – drama
- Upstairs Downstairs (2010) – drama
- Upstart Crow – sitcom
- Utopia – thriller/drama
- Urban Gothic – horror

=== V ===
- The Valleys – reality television
- Van der Valk – detective drama
- Van der Valk (2020 reboot) – detective drama
- The Vanessa Show – talk show
- Vanessa – talk show
- Vanity Fair (1967) – drama
- Vanity Fair (1987) – drama
- Vanity Fair (1998) – drama
- Vanity Fair (2018) – period drama
- Velvet Soup – sketch comedy
- The Venturers – drama
- Vera – crime drama
- A Very British Airline – documentary
- A Very British Coup – political drama
- A Very English Scandal – comedy drama
- A Very Peculiar Practice – comedy drama
- Vexed – police drama
- Vic Reeves Big Night Out – sketch comedy
- The Vicar of Dibley – situation comedy
- The Vice – police drama
- Vicious – sitcom
- Victoria – drama
- Victoria Wood – situation comedy
- Victoria Wood as Seen on TV – sketch comedy
- Victorian Pharmacy – documentary
- The Villa – reality television
- The Village (1993)
- The Village (2013) – historical drama
- Village Hall – drama
- Vision On – children's
- The Visit – comedy
- The Virtual Revolution – technology/documentary
- Viva S Club – sitcom/family entertainment
- The Voice UK – reality talent show
- Vroom Vroom – motorsports

=== W ===
- W1A – comedy
- Waiting for God – situation comedy
- Waking the Dead – police drama
- Walk the Line – talent show
- Walking with Beasts – documentary
- Walking with Cavemen – documentary
- Walking with Dinosaurs – documentary
- Walking with Monsters – documentary
- The Wall – comedy
- Wall of Fame – comedy panel game show
- Wallace and Gromit – clay animation comedy
- Wallace & Gromit's Cracking Contraptions - clay animation comedy
- Wallace and Gromit's World of Invention - science documentary
- Wallander – crime
- The War of the Worlds – drama
- Warships – naval drama
- The Watch – fantasy police procedural
- Watching – situation comedy
- Waterloo Road – drama
- Watership Down – children's
- Watership Down – fantasy
- The Way Things Work – children's educational
- Waybuloo – children's
- We, the Accused
- We are the Champions – children's game show
- We've Got Your Number – game show
- The Weakest Link – game show
- Weavers Green – soap opera
- The Wednesday Play – drama anthology
- Weirdsister College – children's fantasy/magic
- Whack-O! – situation comedy
- The What in the World? Quiz – science panel game
- What's My Line? – panel game
- What Not to Wear – makeover reality television
- What the Papers Say – current affairs / media review
- What-a-Mess – children's
- Whatever Happened to the Likely Lads? – situation comedy
- Whatever I Want – sketch show
- What's the Big Idea? – children's
- Wheel of Fortune – game show
- When Louis Met... – documentary
- When the Boat Comes In – historical drama
- When Were We Funniest? – documentary
- Where the Heart Is – drama
- Where's Wally?: The Animated Series – animated
- Which Way to the War – situation comedy
- White – documentary
- The White Princess – historical fiction
- The White Queen – drama
- White Teeth – drama, comedy
- White Van Man – comedy
- Whitechapel – dramatic
- Whites – situation comedy
- Whizziwig – children's sitcom
- Who Dares Wins (1983) – sketch comedy
- Who Dares Wins (2007) – game show
- Who Dares, Sings! – game show/music
- Who Do You Think You Are – documentary
- Who Gets the Dog? – comedy drama
- Who is Sylvia? – situation comedy
- Who Pays the Ferryman? – drama
- Whoops Apocalypse
- Who Wants to Be a Millionaire? – game show
- The Whole 19 Yards – game show
- Whose Line Is It Anyway? – game show
- Why Don't You? – children's
- The Widow – drama
- Widows – drama
- Wife Swap – reality
- Wild, Wild Women – sitcom
- Wild Africa – nature documentary
- Wild Arabia – nature documentary
- Wild at Heart – family drama
- Wild Brazil – nature documentary
- Wild Burma: Nature's Lost Kingdom – factual/nature documentary
- Wild Caribbean – nature documentary
- Wild China – nature documentary
- Wild Down Under – nature documentary
- Wild Ireland: The Edge of the World – nature documentary
- Wild New World – nature documentary
- Wild West – nature documentary
- Wildlife on One – natural history
- Wil Cwac Cwac – children's
- Wings – historical drama
- Winnie and Wilbur – children's
- Winning Lines – game show
- Wipeout – game show
- Wire in the Blood – police procedural/crime drama
- Wired – thriller
- Wish Me Luck – historical drama
- Wish You Were Here...? – holiday travel
- Wissper – children's animated
- Within These Walls – drama
- Wives and Daughters – drama
- Wizadora – children's
- Wizards vs Aliens – science fantasy/teen drama
- Wobbly Land – children's
- Wodehouse Playhouse – comedy/romance
- Wolf Hall – drama
- The Woman He Loved – romantic drama
- The Woman in White (1982) – mini series
- The Woman in White (1997) – mini series
- The Woman in White (2018) – mini series
- The Wombles – children's
- Wonders of the Monsoon – nature documentary
- The Woodentops – children's
- Woof! – children's
- The Word – post-pub variety show
- Wordplay – game show
- The World About Us – documentary
- The World at War – documentary
- World Business – business/political reportage
- World in Action – documentary
- World Theatre - drama anthology
- The World of Peter Rabbit and Friends – animated
- The World of Wodehouse – comedy
- The World of Wooster – comedy
- The World's Strictest Parents – reality
- World Shut Your Mouth
- Worldwide Exchange – news
- The Worst Week of My Life – sitcom
- The Worst Witch (1998) – children's fantasy/magic
- The Worst Witch (2017) – children's fantasy/magic
- Worzel Gummidge – children's
- Would I Lie to You? – comedy panel game
- Would Like To Meet – reality television/dating
- Wright Around the World – game show
- The Wright Stuff – chat show
- The Wright Taste – documentary
- The Wright Way – sitcom
- Writers – comedy-drama television and web series
- The Wrong Door – sketch comedy
- The Wrong Mans – comedy/sitcom
- Wuthering Heights (1978) – serial
- Wuthering Heights (2009) – serial
- Wycliffe – detective drama
- The Wyvern Mystery

=== X ===
- X-Ray Mega Airport – documentary
- Xpress – popular UK multicultural show
- The X Factor (UK) – singing talent show

=== Y ===
- Yanks Go Home - sitcom
- Years and Years – drama
- Yellowstone – nature documentary
- Yellowstone: Wildest Winter to Blazing Summer – nature documentary
- Yellowthread Street – crime drama
- Yes Minister – situation comedy
- Yes Prime Minister – situation comedy
- Yonderland – fantasy/comedy
- You Have Been Watching – comedy panel game
- You Rang, M'Lord? – sitcom
- You, Me and the Apocalypse – comedy-drama
- You've Been Framed! – comedy
- Young Apprentice – reality television
- A Young Doctor's Notebook – dark black comedy
- Young Hyacinth – sitcom
- Young James Herriot – drama
- The Young Ones – situation comedy
- The Young Person's Guide to Becoming a Rock Star – comedy
- Your Face Sounds Familiar – talent show
- Your Life in Their Hands – medical reality/documentary (1958–1963, 2004–2005)
- Yus, My Dear – sitcom (1976)

=== Z ===
- Z-Cars – drama/action (1962–1978)
- Zack & Quack – animated (2014–2017)
- Zapped – sitcom (2016–2018)
- Zen – police drama (2011)
- Zero Hour – documentary (2004–2008)
- ZingZillas – children's (2010–2012)
- Zoo Quest – nature documentary (1954–1963)
- Zoo Time – children's: animals

== Other languages ==
=== Hindustani ===
- Apna Hi Ghar Samajhiye – magazine

=== Scottish Gaelic ===
- An Là – news
- Dè a-nis? – children's
- Dòtaman – children's
- Eòrpa – current affairs
- Machair – soap opera
- Rapal – music
- Seachd Là – news
- Telefios – news

=== Urdu ===
- Nai Zindagi Naya Jeevan – magazine

=== Welsh ===
- Dechrau Canu, Dechrau Canmol – religion/music
- Newyddion – news
- Noson Lawen – entertainment
- Pobol y Cwm – soap opera
- Heno
- Uned 5 – children's
- Y Clwb Rygbi – sport
- Y Pris – drama

== See also ==
- British sitcom
- List of television programmes broadcast by the BBC
- BBC television drama
- 100 Greatest (Channel 4 poll)
- 100 Greatest British Television Programmes (British Film Institute poll)
- List of Australian television series
- Lists of Canadian television series
