= Dial M =

Dial M may refer to:

- Dial M (Philippine TV series), a public service talk show
- Dial M (UK TV series), a music television series
- Dial M (album), an album by Starflyer 59
