= The Indestructibles (disambiguation) =

The Indestructibles was the name given by ancient Egyptian astronomers to two bright stars.

The Indestructibles may also refer to:

- The Indestructibles (2006 TV series), a British documentary show
- The Indestructibles (2015 TV series), a British action sports inspired TV show
- The Indestructibles (video game), an unreleased arcade strategy video game
