= Not So Much a Programme, More a Way of Life =

British TV programme (1964–1965)

- Genre: Satire, chat
- Country of origin: United Kingdom
- Original language: English
- No. of series: 1

Production
- Producer: Ned Sherrin
- Running time: 45 minutes
- Production company: BBC

Original release
- Network: BBC1
- Release: 13 November 1964 – April 1965

Related
- That Was the Week That Was (1962–1963); BBC-3 (1965–1966)

Not So Much a Programme, More a Way of Life (commonly abbreviated to NSMAPMAWOL, pronounced ens-map-may-wall and stylised as Not so much a programme, more a way of Life) is a BBC-TV satire programme produced by Ned Sherrin, which aired during the winter of 1964–1965, in an attempt to continue and improve on the successful formula of his That Was the Week That Was (known informally as TW3), which had been taken off by the BBC because of a forthcoming general election. As was the case with TW3, NSMAPMAWOL featured David Frost as compère. In the early part of the show's run, two others, William Rushton (as he was billed at the time) and the poet P. J. Kavanagh joined Frost in the role. For the final few months of the series, only David Frost was hosting the show. In addition to Saturdays, there were also editions on Fridays and Sundays.

NSMAPMAWOL saw the first appearances on television of John Bird, Eleanor Bron, Roy Hudd, and John Fortune. Michael Crawford also featured as 'Byron'. The program also regularly featured British singer Cleo Laine. The format alternated satire with chat; the trio of hosts were joined by three guests including regulars Patrick Campbell, Gerald Kaufman and American theatrical agent Harvey Orkin. The programme was one of the most popular the B.B.C. had put on at the time, but was cancelled because of what was deemed its "'irreverent attitude' toward the Royal Family." Protests ensued and the programme was revived, with David Frost as the host and Orkin as “resident wit and panel member.”

Whereas TW3 had had a dark nightclub atmosphere, the new programme used predominantly white sets. The theme tune was sung by Lynda Baron.

NSMAPMAWOL lacked the impact of TW3 and lasted only one series before being replaced by the Robert Robinson-fronted BBC-3 (which aired once a week).
