= BBC-3 (TV series) =

British TV satirical programme (1965–1966)

- Genre: Chat show; Satire
- Presented by: Robert Robinson
- Country of origin: United Kingdom
- Original language: English
- No. of series: 1
- No. of episodes: 24

Production
- Producer: Ned Sherrin
- Running time: 60 minutes

Original release
- Network: BBC1
- Release: 2 October 1965 – 16 April 1966

BBC-3 is a BBC television programme, devised and produced by Ned Sherrin and hosted by Robert Robinson, which aired for twenty-four hour-long editions during the winter of 1965–1966.

It was the third in a line of weekend satire-and-chat shows, successor to That Was the Week That Was and Not So Much a Programme, More a Way of Life, though David Frost did not participate in this series.

Regular performers included John Bird, Eleanor Bron, Lynda Baron, David Battley, Roy Dotrice, Bill Oddie, and Leonard Rossiter. Guests included Millicent Martin and Alan Bennett. The musical director was Dave Lee. With its white sets, BBC-3 retained the look of its predecessor, Not So Much a Programme. Its name was a reference to the BBC's second channel, BBC2, which had started the previous year. An actual channel named BBC Three was launched in 2003.

== Swearing ==
In the edition of 13 November 1965, during a discussion on theatre censorship in which Robert Robinson and Mary McCarthy also participated, Kenneth Tynan supposedly became the first person to say "fuck" on British television. (Although research indicates that the word was used twice before, once by Brendan Behan.) He claimed, perhaps disingenuously, that the word no longer shocked anyone. The storm which resulted forced the BBC to make a public apology for Tynan's comments. No recording of the incident is known to exist.
