= Dumber & Dumberest =

British comedy television programme (2003)

- Created by: Square Donkey
- Narrated by: Noddy Holder
- Country of origin: United Kingdom
- No. of episodes: 6

Production
- Running time: 30 minutes

Original release
- Network: Five
- Release: 2003 – 2003

Dumber & Dumberest was a comedy programme produced by Square Donkey for British television channel Five.
