= Questions for the Future =

- Genre: debate
- Presented by: Geoff Cutmore (2005-present); Simon Hobbs (2005); Ross Westgate (2005)
- Country of origin: United Kingdom
- Original language: English
- No. of seasons: 3
- No. of episodes: 15

Production
- Production location: various
- Running time: 30 minutes

Original release
- Network: CNBC Europe
- Release: 27 January 2005 – present

Questions for the Future is a debate television series aired periodically on financial news channels CNBC Europe, CNBC Asia and CNBC World in the US, currently focusing on the subject of energy. The programmes are produced in association with Shell, which advertises before, during and after each edition, although the company states that CNBC retains full editorial control over their content. Each episode is recorded in a different location around the world, normally with some connection to the topic of discussion. The debate is initially held among a panel of experts, before being opened up to the studio audience.

The first series of the programme was aired in 2005, consisting of six hour-long discussions on such topics as outsourcing (recorded in Mumbai) and globalisation (from the World Economic Forum in Davos, Switzerland). Presenting duties were shared between CNBC Europe anchors Geoff Cutmore, Ross Westgate and Simon Hobbs. A one-off special on the topic of energy consumption followed from the January 2006 WEF meeting.

The format of the programme was altered slightly for the second series in 2006, with the running time of the shows cut to 30 minutes and the topics of conversation confined to aspects of energy such as energy demand, biofuels and sustainability. Cutmore became the permanent presenter of the programme. This format has been retained in the third series, aired in 2007.

Since the inception of Questions for the Future, each episode has been preceded by a 'themed week' of short reports related to the subject to be discussed, filmed on location by the presenter. These reports are aired during CNBC's regular live broadcasts.
