= Open House (1964 TV series) =

1964 British television series

Open House is a 1964 BBC2 TV series presented by Gay Byrne, Peter Haigh and Robert Robinson.

The last episode aired 5 December 1964. The programme's ending allowed BBC2 to start at a sooner time and end at a subsequent time during evening hours.

== Reception ==
In a negative review, Bill Edmund wrote in The Stage and Television Today, "The interviews with the celebrities would be much better if they weren't thanked quite so gushingly for condescending to come. ... Unless I lost count, there were fifteen different items in the programme last Saturday. ...To watch from beginning to end is too much. But how do you know when to switch on for the items you fancy? You can't. You don't." In a mixed review, Otta of Variety stated, "Producers T. Leslie Jackson and Stewart Morris gave a slick and fast-moving format to the melange, and the chief fault was the general flabbiness of Tony Marriott's script, especially in the linking. The interviews, too, seemed a decade out of date. Columnist Lord Arran came over best in this branch of the program, for he makes a living at being outrageous. Tony Osborne's smooth orchestra gave fine backing throughout, though Osborne should give up winking at the camera."

In a mixed review of the first episode, The Stage and Television Today's Marjorie Norris found the show to have numerous "bad habits". She wrote, "Gay Byrne, who I have not seen before, has a pleasant, relaxed charm. But what a struggle the poor man had to inject a little yeast into the soggy dough. The idea of a programme you can pick up and drop whenever you like is a good one—even if it is a dead pinch from radio's Roundabout." Norris continued, "All the same, the musical numbers were the best features of this programme except when the sets cut performers' heads off. For my money, the star of the show was Joe Brown. This young performer has come on apace in the last year but he must learn not to giggle at his own remarks."

The Guardian's Mary Crozier negatively reviewed the show, writing, "The slow, relentless pottering, the bad jokes, the schoolboy howlers, the silly drawings to illustrate news items, the ineffably coy and cosy air of the whole thing was unbelievable. There did seem, however, to be one useful and interesting idea, that of showing places like the Tower of London and Greenwich with the Cutty Sark." Nicholas Barrett of Birmingham Post called the series "two hours of ingratiating light entertainment", stating, "Open House seems to have catered for people who have nothing better to do than watch the box. Its all-grinning, all-jesting presentation from the inevitable black Vynide swivel chair can have done little more than mildly tickle the passing fancy of the sort of audience whose sensibilities have already been dulled by the ad-men."
