= Writers (web series) =

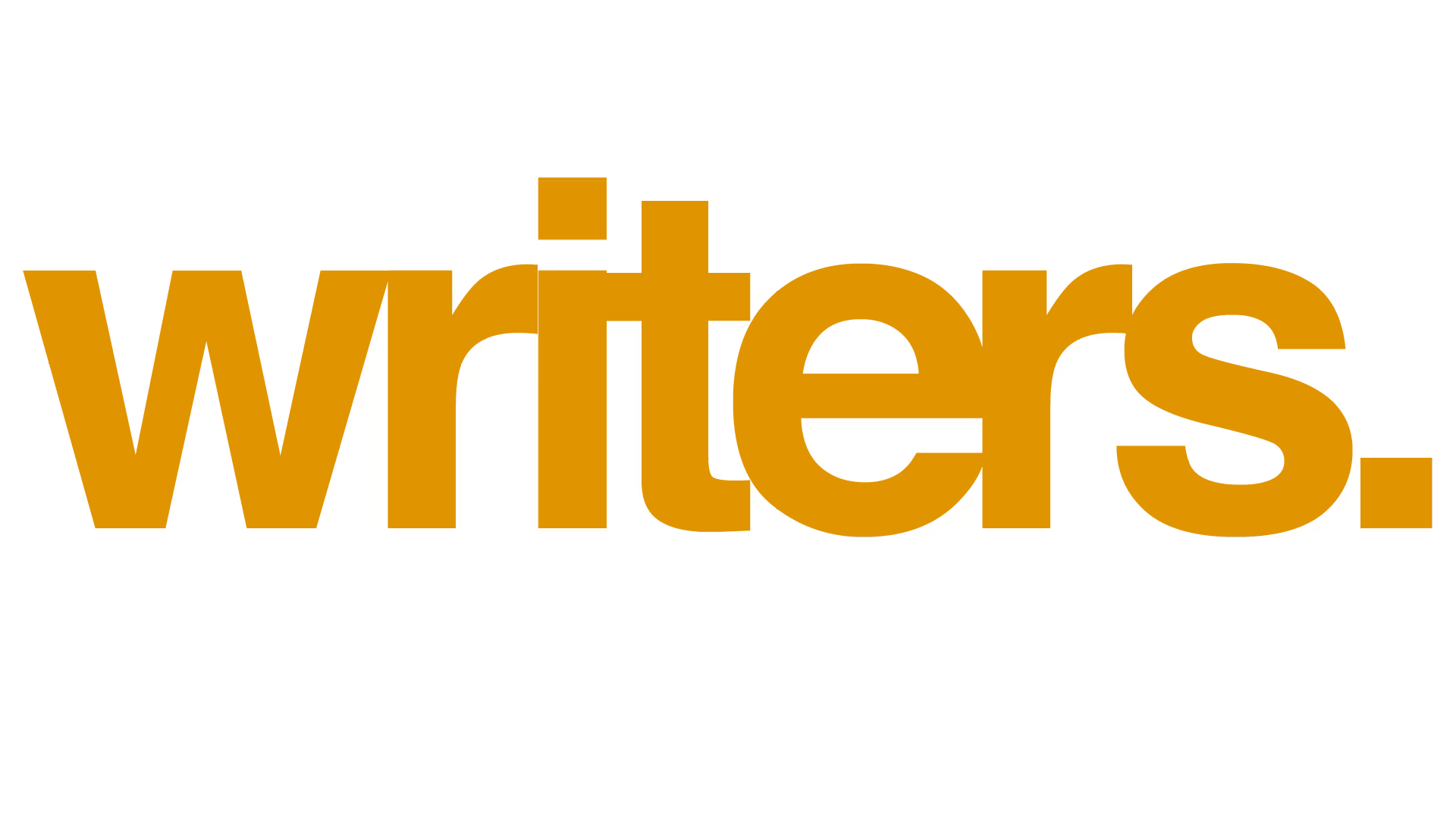
- Genre: Comedy drama, Sitcom
- Created by: Adam T Cottle; Leah Sperring (characters); David Thompson (characters)
- Starring: Leah Sperring; David Thompson; Isabella Cosh; Jack Stringer; Jordan Cottle; Grace Martinson
- Opening theme: "Let Me Write This Down" by Jordan Cottle ft. Leah Sperring
- Composer: Jordan Cottle
- Country of origin: United Kingdom
- Original language: English
- No. of series: 2
- No. of episodes: 11

Production
- Producers: Leah Sperring; Jordan Cottle
- Production location: Bristol
- Cinematography: Robyn Fear
- Camera setup: Single-camera
- Running time: 12–43 minutes
- Production company: Volplex Pictures

Original release
- Network: YouTube
- Release: 22 June 2014 – 22 June 2017

Writers is an independent comedy-drama web series created by Adam T Cottle, featuring characters created by Cottle, Leah Sperring and David Thompson. It follows the personal lives of a dysfunctional group of friends and family who are also writers. It was released on YouTube on CCE Entertainment (now Volplex Pictures) between 2014 and 2017. The first season was briefly broadcast in the UK on the Made Television network in 2015.

== Premise ==
After struggling writers Emmett Shelby and Jess Spencer meet one day during a bout of writer's block, they are fatefuly reunited a year later through Emmett's twin sister Daisy. Daisy is a successful children's author who shares her home with her illustrator boyfriend, Barney Fields, and their flamboyant landlord Hugh Darvill. Jess and Emmett later move in with Daisy. The group also interact with Jenny Sinclair, Daisy's quirky agent who holds unrequited feelings for Emmett.

== Cast ==
=== Main cast ===
- Leah Sperring as Jessica "Jess" Spencer: Daisy's childhood best friend, Emmett's love interest, and an aspiring writer.
- David Thompson as Emmett Shelby: Daisy's twin brother and struggling writer.
- Isabella Cosh as Daisy Shelby: Emmett's twin sister and a popular children's author.
- Jack Stringer as Barney Fields: Daisy's boyfriend and illustrator.
- Jordan Cottle as Hugh Darvill: an unsuccessful gay erotic novelist and the group's landlord.
- Grace Martinson as Jennifer "Jenny" Sinclair: an eccentric literary agent who represents Daisy and has an unrequited attraction to Emmett.

=== Recurring guests ===
- Liz Stewart as Clarice Sparrow: Emmett's girlfriend, later ex-girlfriend. (Season 1-2)
- Joseph Dowling as Parker James III: A childhood friend of Emmett and Daisy's, an enigmatic playboy and the billionaire founder of the Will To Grow Foundation, who becomes a nemesis and later love interest for Jenny. (Season 2)
- Tom Turner as Patrick Spencer: Jess' widower father, who dies suddenly of an aneurysm mid-way through the second season. (Season 2)

=== Guest stars ===
- Nik Uttley as the Interviewer (Season 1)
- Ben Walker as Chauncey, Hugh's psychotic boyfriend (Season 1)
- Emily Thompson as Jo Darvill, Hugh's mute sister (Season 1)

== Production ==
The series began as a short film Adam T Cottle directed as a college graduation project, starring David Thompson and Leah Sperring as two unnamed writers struggling with writer's block, which was released on YouTube in June 2014. Production on the series began shortly after. Initially planned as six fifteen-minute episodes, the episodes eventually reached the standard length for broadcast television.

A second season launched on 6 February 2016. Four episodes were released before the series went on a fifteen month hiatus in March 2016. The season concluded with a one-off special on 22 June 2017. An additional episode, titled Writers: The Final Chapter, composed of material from the planned two-part second season finale, was announced with a trailer at the end of the special but was never released. A third season was planned to conclude the series, but was later cancelled.

In the UK, the first season was picked up for national broadcast by the Made Television network. The series debuted on 28 July 2015 with an hour-long premiere made of the original short and the first episode of season one.

In a blog post marking the tenth anniversary of the second season's premiere, Adam T Cottle revealed that the season went through a troubled production owing to its limited budget and the busy schedules of its cast, resulting in a fifteen-month hiatus following the release of the fourth episode. The fifth episode was eventually recut to serve as a one-off special to conclude the season; the planned sixth and seventh episodes, a two-part story titled Daisy's Choice, were partially-shot but never completed.

== Episodes ==
Series	Episodes	Originally released	
Series	Episodes	First released	Last released
1	6	22 June 2014	14 March 2015
2	5	6 February 2016	22 June 2017

=== Season 1 (2014–15) ===
The original short film (later retitled Season One Prologue) was released on June 22nd 2014. The first season was released weekly from January 24th to March 14th 2015 on the CCE Entertainment YouTube channel. The third episode, One Flew Over the Sparrow's Nest, was released in two parts, although both episodes are still referred to as "Episode Three".

The titles of the first, second, third, fifth and sixth episodes each reference the title of a novel: Interview with the Vampire, A Game of Thrones, One Flew Over the Cuckoo's Nest, On the Road, and A Tale of Two Cities respectively. In contrast, the fourth episode references the title of a play: A Streetcar Named Desire.

No. overall	No. in season	Title	Directed by	Written by	Runtime	Original release date
0	0	"Season One Prologue"	Adam T Cottle	Adam T Cottle	12:38	22 June 2014
1	1	"Interview with the Writer"	Adam T Cottle	Adam T Cottle	33:18	24 January 2015
2	2	"A Game of Homes"	Adam T Cottle	Adam T Cottle	26:10	31 January 2015
3	3	"One Flew Over the Sparrow's Nest – Part One"	Adam T Cottle	Adam T Cottle	13:10	14 February 2015
3	3	"One Flew Over the Sparrow's Nest – Part Two"	Adam T Cottle	Adam T Cottle	13:12	21 February 2015
4	4	"An Emotion Named Desire"	Adam T Cottle	Adam T Cottle	21:05	28 February 2015
5	5	"On The Road"	Adam T Cottle	Adam T Cottle	22:17	7 March 2015
6	6	"A Tale of Two Scarves"	Adam T Cottle	Adam T Cottle	31:37	14 March 2015

=== Season 2 (2016–17) ===
The first four episodes of the second season were released weekly from February 6th to March 5th 2016 on the CCE Entertainment YouTube channel. The fourth episode, Father's Day, was released in two parts, although both episodes are still referred to as "Episode Four". A fifth episode was released on June 22nd 2017 after a fifteen month hiatus to conclude the second season.

As with the first season, the episode titles each reference the title of a novel: Flashforward, Breakfast at Tiffany's, Barney's Version, Father's Day and We Need to Talk About Kevin respectively. The planned title of the unreleased sixth and seventh episodes, Daisy's Choice, referenced the novel Sophie's Choice.

No. overall	No. in season	Title	Directed by	Written by	Runtime	Original release date
7	1	"FlashForward"	Adam T Cottle	Adam T Cottle	42:59	6 February 2016
8	2	"Breakfast at Daisy's"	Adam T Cottle	Adam T Cottle	28:20	13 February 2016
9	3	"Jenny's Version"	Jordan Cottle	Adam T Cottle & Jordan Cottle	33:22	20 February 2016
10	4	"Father's Day – Part One"	Adam T Cottle	Adam T Cottle	23:28	27 February 2016
10	4	"Father's Day – Part Two"	Adam T Cottle	Adam T Cottle	14:28	5 March 2016
11	5	"We Need to Talk About Jess"	Adam T Cottle	Adam T Cottle	32:08	22 June 2017
