= Fat Families =

British television programme

- Genre: Documentary
- Presented by: Steve Miller
- Theme music composer: Lawrence Oakley
- Country of origin: United Kingdom
- Original language: English
- No. of series: 2
- No. of episodes: 14

Production
- Executive producer: Laura Mansfield
- Running time: 60 minutes
- Production company: Outline Productions

Original release
- Network: Sky1
- Release: 6 January – 30 December 2010

Fat Families is a British documentary reality show that was broadcast on Sky1 from 6 January to 30 December 2010. Steve Miller helps overweight families to improve their lifestyles and eating habits, and cutting their medical bills in half as a result.

In each programme Miller initially spends 24 hours with the family and observes their diet on a typical day. He then spends the rest of the week educating the family about what they can do to lose weight. At the end of the week Miller modifies the family home to keep them motivated. The families are then given a further 9 weeks to lose weight and Miller gives each person a target weight loss.

Families are also revisited months later in episodes titled "Second Helpings" to see how they have progressed.

== Episodes ==
=== Series 1 ===
Episode	Family	Original airdate
1	The Cuff family	6 January 2010
Miller visits the Cuff family in Telford. Anne loses 28 pounds, Mike loses 28 pounds and Tarnya loses 49 pounds.
2	The Jeapes family	13 January 2010
Miller visits the Jeapes family in Eastbourne. Ron loses 22 pounds, Daniel loses 25 pounds, Mark loses 25 pounds and Alan loses 16 pounds.
3	The Huzzey family	20 January 2010
Miller visits the Huzzey family in Chelmsford. Phil loses 48 pounds, Jan loses 49 pounds and Kaleigh loses 24 pounds.
4	The Radford family	27 January 2010
Miller visits the Radford family in Blackpool. Lou loses 13 pounds and Steven loses 11 pounds. (Steven died on 26 July 2011 due to dilated cardiomyopathy and other incurable damage caused by his obesity.)
5	The Blackholly family	3 February 2010
Miller visits the Blackholly family in Wiltshire. Toni loses 38 pounds and Neil loses 60 pounds.
6	The Haddrell family	10 February 2010
Miller visits the Haddrell family in Luton. Eileen loses 28 pounds, Linda loses 27 pounds, Matt loses 31 pounds and Sarah loses 28 pounds.

=== Series 2 ===
Episode	Family	Original airdate
1	The Joell-Ireland family	25 October 2010
2	The Turner family	26 October 2010
3	The Gunning family	27 October 2010
4	The Parker family	1 November 2010
5	Jasette, Ladonna, Sharlene and Tracey	2 November 2010
Miller visits Jasette, Ladonna, Sharlene and Tracey in London. Jasette loses 28 pounds, Ladonna loses 28 pounds, Sharlene loses 25 pounds and Tracey loses 29 pounds.
6	The D'Arcier family	3 November 2010
Miller visits the D'Arcier family in North Yorkshire. Michelle loses 18 pounds and Bridget loses 17 pounds.
7	The Brookes family	8 November 2010
Miller visits the Brookes family in Liverpool. Clare loses 27 pounds and Andrew loses 50 pounds.
8	The Middleton family	15 November 2010
Miller visits the Middleton family in Birmingham. A.J. loses 33 pounds and Charlie loses 37 pounds.

== Reception ==
Fat Families was noted for Miller's presentation style and ruthless tone, described by The Northern Echo as "toe-curlingly honest with the people who take part in the show." The Guardian speculated that "the food-cam, phrases such as 'It's time to get off your wobbly bums' and the fact that Miller resembles a creation of Shirley Ghostman's Marc Wootton, mean it's got to be a spoof." In 2022 clips of the programme went viral on TikTok.
