= Talking Threads =

- Talking Threads logo
- Genre: Art/Crafts
- Directed by: Paul Aitken
- Presented by: Jamie Malden; Holly Pulsford
- Country of origin: United Kingdom
- No. of episodes: 10

Production
- Executive producer: Jamie Malden
- Running time: ~24 minutes

Original release
- Network: Country Channel
- Release: 14 October 2009 – 2009

Talking Threads is a magazine-style programme targeted at the market for textile art that aims to inspire people to be creative with fabric. Shown on The Country Channel, on Sky TV, Talking Threads has a potential audience of fifty million people, with a large percentage of these being UK-based.

== Series 1 ==
A pilot series of ten half-hour episodes aimed to feature fabric artists giving demonstrations of the techniques which have made them accomplished artists, according to professionals in the field. It was scheduled to be shown on October 14, 2009, on Sky Channel 171.

According to The Country Channel, Talking Threads was "uniquely placed" to attract a diverse audience:

The world of textile art is one that appeals to a vast demographic range: in addition to the more traditional sewing audience this programme would target everyone from parents watching with young children to university students wanting ideas for customizing their clothes. The craft industry is not only unaffected by the credit crunch but has attracted a larger following as people turn to repairing or restyling old clothes to avoid purchasing new ones. Talking Threads is ideally placed to take advantage of the influx of people approaching textile and fabric art for the first time, while allowing those more experienced in the practice to see their favourite artists and their work.

=== Format ===
Each episode aims to feature the artistic stylings and a demonstration by one artist, on how to make a specific piece, an interview and an exclusive look into their portfolio.

In every episode viewers were taught simple fabric art techniques, such as embellishing or fabric dyeing, from which they can expand their creative horizons. They are also taken through a step by step process culminating in the creation of their own piece of textile art. The final episode is filmed at The Festival of Quilts, at the Birmingham NEC.

=== Artists ===
The following artists are featured in the series:

- Lulu Smith
- Angie Hughes
- Linda Mille
- Gilda Baron
- Anne Griffiths
- Jill Kennedy
- Fay Maxwell
- Myfanwy Hart
- Di Wells
- Kim Thittichai

=== DVD release ===
Series 1 aims to be made available on DVD.
