= The Beat of London =

Australian TV variety series

- Genre: Variety
- Presented by: Darren McMullen; Laura Whitmore; Dave Berry
- Countries of origin: Australia; United Kingdom
- Original language: English
- No. of seasons: 1
- No. of episodes: 13

Production
- Production locations: London, United Kingdom
- Running time: 30 minutes

Original release
- Network: Fox8
- Release: 30 July – 10 August 2012

The Beat of London is a variety program aired on Fox8 on 30 July 2012 until 10 August 2012, hosted by Darren McMullen, Laura Whitmore and Dave Berry.

== Overview ==
The programme features world celebrities, sports personalities, comedians and live music gigs including Grammy Award-fame singers like Mark Ronson, Katy B, Dizzee Rascal, and many more.

"I'm extremely excited to be in London for the Games hosting a show that will be focused on a youth audience," was the remark made by McMullen about the program. Dave Berry from London's Capital FM took the responsibility of running a 'pop-up' live studio in a road-bus to the Olympic venues capturing the events targeted for the teenagers of the world. The Beat of London was a joint venture between ITV and Coca-Cola covering more than 30 countries.
