= Ask the Family =

British TV game show (1967–2005)

- Also known as: Dick & Dom's Ask the Family (2005)
- Genre: Game show
- Created by: Patricia Owtram
- Presented by: Robert Robinson; Alan Titchmarsh; Dick and Dom
- Country of origin: United Kingdom
- Original language: English
- No. of series: 18
- No. of episodes: 275

Production
- Running time: 30 minutes

Original release
- Network: BBC1
- Release: 12 July 1967 – 22 October 1984
- Network: UK Gold
- Release: 6 June – 10 October 1999
- Network: BBC Two
- Release: 4 April – 5 May 2005

Ask the Family is a British game show that was first broadcast on BBC1 from 12 July 1967 to 22 October 1984 hosted by Robert Robinson and then on UK Gold from 6 June to 10 October 1999 hosted by Alan Titchmarsh and from 4 April to 5 May 2005 hosted by Dick & Dom on BBC Two.

== Format ==
The show took the form of a quiz contest between two teams, with each team consisting of four members of a single family – two parents and two teenage children. Over the course of the thirty-minute show the teams were asked a variety of general knowledge questions and mental puzzles, with the winner advancing to later rounds, culminating in a grand final between the two families that had been unbeaten in the series.

The teams were asked questions, with certain questions directed at only certain members of the family – such as "children only", or "father and elder child only".

== Transmissions ==
Series	Start date	End date	Episodes	Presenter
1	12 July 1967	23 August 1967	7	Robert Robinson
2	9 September 1968	23 December 1968	15	Robert Robinson
3	8 September 1969	29 December 1969	17	Robert Robinson
4	14 September 1970	28 December 1970	16	Robert Robinson
5	13 September 1971	27 December 1971	16	Robert Robinson
6	24 January 1973	9 May 1973	16	Robert Robinson
7	10 September 1974	7 January 1975	15	Robert Robinson
8	5 January 1976	19 April 1976	15	Robert Robinson
9	3 January 1977	8 April 1977	15	Robert Robinson
10	9 January 1978	24 April 1978	15	Robert Robinson
11	23 April 1979	20 August 1979	15	Robert Robinson
12	21 April 1980	18 August 1980	15	Robert Robinson
13	6 April 1981	10 August 1981	15	Robert Robinson
14	2 November 1982	14 December 1982	7	Robert Robinson
15	21 September 1983	16 November 1983	8	Robert Robinson
16	3 September 1984	22 October 1984	8	Robert Robinson
17	6 June 1999	10 October 1999	31	Alan Titchmarsh
18	4 April 2005	5 May 2005	23	Dick and Dom

== Theme tune ==
Early episodes – from 1967 to 1973 and perhaps beyond – used the track "Acka Raga" from the 1967 John Mayer and Joe Harriott album Indo Jazz Fusions as the theme tune.

== In popular culture ==
The show was parodied in contemporary comedy TV shows during the 1970s and 1980s, notably in Not the Nine O'Clock News in which both families were introduced as being almost identical save for surname, with all being quantity surveyors by profession (including the children). A spoof edition on The Kenny Everett Television Show featured Everett as Robert Robinson and as the (female) heads of the respective Windsor and Thatcher families. An episode of the radio sketch show I'm Sorry, I'll Read That Again opened with a parody where "Robin Robertson", played by John Cleese, poured scorn on the families and abandoned them in disgust. One episode of The Burkiss Way likewise parodied it as Ask the Cleverdicks. In the late 1990s a sketch in The Fast Show featured three middle-aged men arguing about which of them had the most middle-class upbringing: one of the men boasts that his family appeared on "Ask the Family with Robert Robinson – and we won!".

At one point tabloid newspapers made much of an occasion where the father of one family correctly answered the question "What is the sum of all the numbers from 1 to 100?" in a few seconds. However, there is a quick formula for the answer, as demonstrated by Carl Friedrich Gauss, and the answer may have been known to the person in question.
