= Bus Life =

- Genre: Sitcom
- Created by: Ben Ward
- Voices of: Ashley Jones; Katie Angelou; James Bird; Nancy Wallinger; Daniel Bickerdike; Clare Thomas; Joseph Gritt; Daisy Evans; Elizabeth Holme-Gwillin
- Country of origin: United Kingdom
- Original language: English
- No. of seasons: 1
- No. of episodes: 13

Production
- Running time: 5 minutes

Original release
- Network: Disney Channel
- Release: 2003 – 2004

Bus Life is an English mini-series that aired on Disney Channel in England from 2003-2004.

== Plot ==
Bus Life follows the trails and tribulations of secondary school pupils on the way home from school. The includes stereotypical 'gangs' (or cliques) of people of the bus, such as "The Brainy Kids", "The Skaters" and "The Goths". The show breaks the fourth wall throughout the series.

== Characters ==
- Rick (Ashley Cavender-Jones) - Rick is the most popular child in school and one of the hottest, and one of the main characters who leads to solving the dilemmas on the bus. He is very athletic and respected around everyone. It is indicated that he may have a crush on Sally in a few episodes, but nothing has come out of it yet. Although in one episode they do go out for a period of 10 seconds before Rick breaks it off, this being because Rick admitted to liking Sally to Eddie so Eddie would forget about a birthday card he took off Rick, so that no-one found out that it was Rick's birthday. Rick was doing this so he could avoid something that is unknown because the episode then comes to an end when everyone finds out. It is indicated it could have been pinches or punches
- Sally (Katie Angelou) - Sally is quiet, bashful and often friendly. It is hinted that she has a crush on Rick in few episodes, although no actual relationship has come out of it yet. Although they did go out for a period of 10 seconds. Although she shows great knowledge in school, she's a dimwit when it comes to solving real life problems.
- Eddie (James Bird) - Eddie is the youngest and most immature of the group. He considers it a privilege to be able to sit on the top floor of the bus with the older children. He is Jess's younger brother and is the most funny of his friends.
- Jess (Nancy Wallinger) - Jess is Eddie's older sister, yet they come from totally different ethnic backgrounds. She is very superficial and is usually found talking on her cellphone. She is also very pretty. Is friends with Sally, but is embarrassed to talk to her in public (i.e., in front of her boyfriend).
- Goth (Daniel Bickerdike) - Morbid and quiet, the head goth is the stereotypical idea of a goth. He is often reserved within his clique and holds certain rules and fundamental basics on clique acceptance. He is the leader of the Goths and tends to be in competition with the skateboarder girl often.
- Skate (Clare Thomas) - The leader of the skateboarders, although is clearly the most charismatic member of the skateboarders, is known as the most intelligent of them - which, considering to Jess, is not very intelligent. She is very outgoing and often is in competition with the head goth.
- Fleabag (Joseph Gritt) - A boy on the bus with very bad hygiene that people avoid often. Is known to sit by himself.
- Bruiser (Daisy Evans) - the school bully, also sits by herself as she is intimidating to the others.
- Posh Girl (Elizabeth Holme-Gwillin) - a girl who sits at the front of the bus. Has rolled her eyes in exasperation in every single episode.
- Big Nose - a boy who could detect culprits in investigations by using his nose to smell out the indication. Is meant to be a Sherlock Holmes type investigator. Starred in one episode.
- The "Foreign" Kid - a boy who starred in one episode who would not let the main characters have their seats they usually sit on. He pretended to be foreign so he can have the advantage of achieving what he wants, but the main characters find a way into tricking him to grab their seats back.
- T - Jess's boyfriend she is often on the phone to, who never appears in a single episode.

== Episodes ==
Some of the adventures they had included:

- Eddie forgetting to pay for a chocolate bar and the other kids putting him on trial.
- The bus breaking down and the kids forming a Lord of the Flies sort of situation.
- Someone stepping in dog excrement.
- A foreign child sitting in the back seat, where the gang always sits.
- Jess getting bubble gum in her hair and the others having to get it out.
- The gang missing their stop and being driven all the way to the bus depot.
- Rick having to hide the fact that it is his birthday to avoid getting Birthday Beats.
- Eddie missing the bus and forgetting about his detention ("Requiem of Eddie").

== Accolades ==
- Bus Life won a Grand Jury Prize at the New York Television Festival in 2004.
- Nominated - Best Drama - British Academy Children's Television Awards
- Nominated - Best Original writer: Ben ward - British Academy Children's Television Awards
