= Live TV Bingo =

- Genre: Live, Gaming Interactive show
- Starring: Claire Anstey, Richie Litchfield, Stuart Stone, Paul Metcalfe, Syritta Spearring, Claira Hermet, Bingo B. Bear.
- Country of origin: United Kingdom
- No. of episodes: N/A, Aired Weekdays 2:00pm - 4:00pm

Production
- Running time: 2 hours

Original release
- Network: Sky Digital (UK) Channel 847 & 182
- Release: 23 August 2006 – September 2006

For television in the United Kingdom, Live TV Bingo is a British television game show.

== Presenters ==
TV Bingo has a team of regular presenters. They include Claire Anstey, Richie Litchfield, Stuart Stone, Paul Metcalfe, Syritta Spearring, Claira Hermet and many more with a different presenter every 30 minutes. The programme's mascot was a panda called Bingo B. Bear.

== Method of Play ==
Chips are placed on the table by means of a telephone menu.

TV Bingo is a fixed odds betting game similar to the lottery or Keno.

Contestants choose 6 numbers using their telephone by calling the number on screen during the show and follow the prompts. They can pick six numbers of their own or simply go for a "Lucky Dip" where the six numbers are randomly selected by the computer.

Once a contestant has registered they can buy a TV Bingo ticket for anything from a minimum of £1 up to a maximum of £10. Once they have selected and confirmed their numbers they are in for the next draw. If they get in early enough they should also see their numbers and their player name appear on screen.

Every two minutes "Get ready to Jumble" where the winnings numbers are revealed by the computer. After this a list of the winners will appear on screen.

Below is a list of the possible payouts for the game to give some examples of what a contestant can win.

Pay outs from a £1 ticket 1 no = £1 2 no's = £2 3 no's = £20 4 no's = £100 5 no's = £1000 6 no's = £10,000

Pay outs from a £10 Ticket 1 no = £10 2 no = £20 3 no = £100 4 no = £1000 5 no = £10,000 6 no = £100,000

== Winners on TV Bingo ==
After each round, every winner from that game is displayed on screen, along with the amount of money won.
