= Robert Robinson (broadcaster) =

English radio and television presenter (1927–2011)

- Robinson presenting Ask the Family in 1982
- Born: Robert Henry Robinson; 17 December 1927; Liverpool, England
- Died: 12 August 2011 (aged 83); Paddington, London, England
- Occupations: Radio presenter; television presenter; journalist; author
- Years active: 1955–2010
- Spouse: Josephine Richard (m. 1958)
- Children: 3, including Lucy

Robert Henry Robinson (17 December 1927 – 12 August 2011) was an English radio and television presenter, game show host, journalist and author. He presented Ask the Family for many years on the BBC.

== Biography and career ==
Robinson was born in Liverpool, England the son of an accountant father, and educated at Raynes Park Grammar School in south London and Exeter College, Oxford. He then became a journalist, as TV columnist for the Sunday Chronicle, film and theatre columnist for the Sunday Graphic, radio critic and editor of Atticus column for the Sunday Times and film critic for The Sunday Telegraph.

He began working on television as a journalist in 1955. During the 1960s and 1970s, he presented the series Open House, Picture Parade, Points of View, the leading literary quiz Take it or Leave it, Ask the Family, BBC-3 – including the discussion during which Kenneth Tynan became the first person to say "fuck" on British television (Robinson told Tynan that this was "an easy way to make history") – and Call My Bluff.

In 1967, Robinson presented the edition of The Look of the Week in which classical musicologist Hans Keller was brought face to face with the young Pink Floyd. He wrote and presented The Fifties on BBC1. Robinson was the presenter of The Book Programme on BBC2 from 1973 to 1980 and a number of spin-off documentaries, such as B. Traven – A Mystery Solved (1979). He wrote and presented several BBC1 documentaries under the title Robinson's Travels, among them The Mormon Trail (1976), Cruising and Indian Journey. In 1986 he wrote and presented The Magic Rectangle, one of the BBC documentaries marking the 50th anniversary of television.

On radio, he presented Today, BBC Radio 4's flagship morning news show, and Stop The Week, a fiercely competitive talk programme. Robinson fronted Brain of Britain on BBC Radio 4 for many years, but was replaced by Russell Davies during the 2004 series owing to illness. He returned to host the new series in 2005 until handing over the reins to Peter Snow in 2007. In September 2008 Robinson chaired the special Brain of Brains and Top Brain editions of the quiz and returned to host the series in 2008; Davies then replaced him for the 2009 shows. In August 2010 it was announced that Robinson was to step down permanently from Brain of Britain to be replaced by Davies.

Robinson was known for his comb-over hairstyle. Private Eye used to lampoon Robinson under the nickname Smuggins. In a sketch on the BBC's Not the Nine O'Clock News he was impersonated by an actor wearing a cricket box over his forehead. Robinson was also the subject of a sketch by Stephen Fry and Hugh Laurie in the second series of A Bit of Fry & Laurie, and Fry occasionally did an affectionate impression of Robinson when hosting the quiz show QI. He was also lampooned by comedy duo David Mitchell and Robert Webb in the second series of That Mitchell and Webb Look, where he was shown as the presenter of an early version of their fictional gameshow Numberwang. He appeared in a Viz comic strip under the name Robin Robertson.

== Personal life ==
Robinson married actress Josephine Richard, whom he had met while a student at Oxford, in 1958. They had three children including the actress Lucy Robinson. The couple remained together for more than fifty years, until Robert's death. He died aged 83 in St Mary's Hospital, Paddington on 12 August 2011 after a long period of ill health.

== Books ==
- Inside Robert Robinson (journalism)
- Prescriptions of a Pox Doctor's Clerk (journalism)
- Landscape with Dead Dons (1956) (mystery novel)
- The Conspiracy (1968) (novel)
- The Dog Chairman (1982) (journalism)
- The Everyman Book of Light Verse (1984) (as editor)
- Bad Dreams (1989) (novel)
- Skip All That (1996) (autobiography)
- The Club (2000) (novel)
