= Dial M (British TV series) =

- Country of origin: United Kingdom
- Original language: English

Production
- Running time: 30 minutes

Original release
- Network: Loaded TV
- Release: 28 November 2012 – present

Dial M is a UK music television series. The programme was devised by Paul Baxendale-Walker and was launched on 28 November 2012. The shows are broadcast on Sky satellite television and online. The premise of the programme is the showcasing of a contemporary, and more established, music acts each week, recorded live in session in the studio, plus interviews, and links with live external music venues.

== Guest bands ==
The Strangers
The Tuesday Club
Chozen
The Damn Vandals
Picture Book
The Wholls
Heaven's Basement
Legend in Japan
Spear of Destiny
Fearless Vampire Killers
The Harlots
Nikki Murray
Rachel R
Sam Gray
Sam Wray
Stiff Little Fingers
The Jam
