= The Indestructibles (2015 TV series) =

Television series

- Genre: Comedy, Action-Sports
- Starring: Tim Warwood, Adam Gendle, Joe Rackley, and Oliver Peart
- Original language: English

Original release
- Network: Dave
- Release: 8 November – 13 December 2015

The Indestructibles is a sport-inspired action TV show which first appeared on Dave on 8 November 2015. The show features sports-action-athletes-turned-media-personalities Tim Warwood, Adam Gendle, Joe Rackley, and Oliver Peart, and is sponsored by fashion-watch brand Casio G-Shock.

== Premise ==
The Indestructibles takes the audiences on to a journey as they set out to create mammoth moments- never seen before- inspired by the heroes of Action Sports. In each episode, The Indestructibles team is dropped on a location, where they have to take inspiration from their surroundings and dream up dangerous stunts. The team has three days, two props, and £1000 in cash to build and test their creations, and must convince an athlete from the world of action sports to take on their challenge.

== Episodes ==
The first episode aired on 8 November 2015.

Episode 1 "Bouncing Bombs" Featuring Gary Connery & Sam Hardy

Synopsis: Given a massive zip-line and an inflatable Zorb, Tim & Gendle dream up the hair-brained idea of trying to bounce a man across a lake and into a target Dambusters style. With just three days to pull it off, they’ll need to work out how to safely attach the Zorb, and release it into the water at a high speed without hurting the stuntman inside. Easy, er not exactly...

Episode 2 "Rickshaw Wreckers" Featuring Chris Akrigg & Tom Dowie

Synopsis: So how about we take one of the best trial mountain bikers on the planet, take him to a massive bike park...and then see if he can survive the run riding a rusty rickshaw? That’s the crazy challenge Tim & Gendle set to pro rider Chris Akrigg. Will Chris be able to handle the demands of the track? Will Tim & Gendle be brave enough to ride in the back? There’s only one way to find out…

Episode 3 "Parkour Apocalypse" Featuring Chase Armitage & Martin Wan

Episode 4 "No Snow, No Problem" Featuring Sven Thorgren, Murray Buchan & Dan Wakeham

Episode 5 "Human Hole In One" Featuring Bob Manchester, Luke Padgett, Joe Baddeley, Craig Teague

Episode 6 "Human Marble Run" Featuring Tom Down, Dan Whitby, Tom Dowie

Episode 7 "Abandoned BMX" Featuring Jason Phelan

Episode 8 "'Gimme Some Skim" Featuring Ryan Peacock, Jack Battleday & Billy Morgan

Episode 9 "Drift off to Sleep" Featuring Buttsy Butler & Luke Woodham

Episode 10 "DIY Daredevils" Featuring Lowri Davies, Fathead & Manhead

Episode 11 "Will It Surf" Featuring Andrew Cotton & Lyndon Wake

Episode 12 "Best of"
