= William Goodchild =

- Born: William James Osbourne Goodchild; Northampton, UK
- Genres: film score, contemporary classical, jazz
- Occupation(s): composer, orchestrator, conductor
- Instrument(s): violin, viola, piano, synths, electric bass
- Spouse: Rachel Goodchild (married 1990-present)
- Website: williamgoodchild.com

William Goodchild is a British composer, orchestrator and conductor who produces music for film, television and the concert hall.

== Early life and education ==
William Goodchild was born in Northampton, England to an Australian-born father, the late Ronald Goodchild, (formerly Suffragan Bishop of Kensington), and an English mother, Jean Ross. In the autumn of 1964, the family moved to London where his father became Bishop of Kensington. Here the family stayed until 1980, when his mother and father retired, eventually moving to North Devon. Goodchild attended The Hall School and received musical education at the Royal College of Music (1970–1974) where he was a Junior Exhibitioner, studying violin and piano. After gaining a music scholarship to Colet Court, and subsequently, St Paul's School (1974–1981), He obtained a Bachelor's degree with Honours in Music at the University of East Anglia (1982–1985). He holds a Diploma of Licentiate in Pianoforte from the Guildhall School of Music and Drama (1989). He studied conducting with Richard Hickox, John Lubbock, and George Hurst, piano with Sidney Harrison, John York and Katherine Miller, jazz piano with Leon Cohen, and composition with Peter Aston and Julian Webb.

== Career ==
Goodchild's interest in film composition began when working as a music assistant to British composer Edward Williams, preparing scores, and playing and conducting for recording sessions on television projects for Williams.

He has scored films for broadcasters including Netflix, BBC, Channel 4, Channel 5, PBS, National Geographic Channel, Discovery Channel and YouTube Originals. Scores composed by Goodchild include four-part Netflix series, Chimp Empire (2023), feature documentary The Letter: A Message For Our Earth (YouTube Originals/ PBS, 2022), Surviving Paradise: A Family Tale (a Netflix Original, 2022), and H2O: The Molecule That Made Us (PBS and BBC, 2019). There are three original motion picture soundtrack albums composed by William currently available to stream: Chimp Empire, The Letter: A Message For Our Earth, and Africa's Fishing Leopards.

Goodchild has worked with orchestras including the Royal Philharmonic Orchestra, BBC Concert Orchestra, BBC National Orchestra of Wales, City of Birmingham Symphony Orchestra, London Metropolitan Orchestra, Budapest Art Orchestra and Bristol Ensemble. He has recorded at many of the major London recording studios including Abbey Road Studios, Associated Independent Recording Studios, Angel Recording Studios, and CTS Lansdowne Studios. As a conductor and orchestrator he has undertaken projects for the BBC including Nature's Great Events, Wild China, Ganges, Europe – a Natural History, Journey of Life and Wild New World. As conductor, Goodchild has recorded for Sony Classical Records, Universal Records, Hyperion Records and CBS Masterworks.

On stage and in the recording studio, Goodchild has collaborated with solo artists including guitarist John Williams, saxophonist Andy Sheppard, members of the Maggini Quartet, violinist Natalia Lomeiko, percussionist Alasdair Malloy, O-Duo, Tom Jones, and drum and bass artist Roni Size and Reprazent.

He is Senior Associate Teacher at University of Bristol, giving lectures on Media Composition as part of the MA Composition of Music for Film and Television course - a post he has held since September 2008. He also gives talks on Music for Film for organizations such as BBC Studios Natural History Unit, Wildscreen Festival, Cardiff University School of Music and City University London.

Goodchild's sound recording studio is located in Bristol. He is a member of The Ivors Academy and PRS for Music.

=== Film and television music (2006–2023) ===
- Chimp Empire (2023) - Netflix Original documentary series. Produced by Underdog Films and Keo Films. Narrated by Mahershala Ali and directed by James Reed
- The Letter: A Message for Our Earth (2022) - YouTube Originals feature documentary. Produced by Off the Fence, YouTube Originals, and Laudato Si Movement. Written and directed by Nicolas Brown
- Surviving Paradise: A Family Tale (2022) - Netflix Original natural history documentary feature. Produced by Wild Space Productions Ltd (Netflix) / Freeborne Media Ltd. Narrated by Regé-Jean Page. Produced and Directed by Renée Godfrey; Co-Directed / Edited by Matt Meech; Cinematograher: Brad Besterlink; Executive Producer: James Honeyborne
- Tibet: Roof of the World/ Into the Wild Tibet (2020) - Natural history documentary for theatrical release and four international TV versions for broadcast on stations including Smithsonion Channel. Produced by Infocus Asia Pte Ltd, Singapore. Narrated by Russell Boulter; Executive Producers: Karen Bass and Dean Johnson
- H2O: The Molecule that Made Us (2019) - Factual series. A Passion Planet Production for WGBH/PBS/BBC. Narrated by Kelly McEvers; Produced by David Allen and Catherine Watling; Directed by Nicolas Brown and Alex Tate
- Hippos: Africa's River Giants (2019-2020) - Natural history documentary for BBC Natural World. Produced by Icon Films. Narrated by Sir David Attenborough; Director: Brad Bestelink; Producers: Laura Marshall and Lucy Meadows
- South Korea: Earth's Hidden Wilderness (2018) - Natural history documentary for BBC Two. Produced by Terra Mater and Oxford Scientific Films. Narrator: Arthur Lee; Producer/Director: James Reed; Executive Producer: Caroline Hawkins; Natural History Producer: Philip Jones; Commissioning Editor for BBC: Craig Hunter
- Jeremy Wade's Mighty Rivers (2018) - Natural history documentary series for Animal Planet. Presented by Jeremy Wade. Produced by Icon Films.Series Producer: Steve Gooder
- Fake or Fortune? (2011 to date) - Arts series. Produced by BBC Studios for BBC One. Presented by Fiona Bruce and Philip Mould. Series Producer: Robert Murphy
- Supercharged Otters (2017-2018) - Natural history documentary for BBC Natural World. Produced by BBC Natural History Unit. Presented by Charlie Hamilton James and produced by Mark Wheeler. Series Producer: Roger Webb
- Rise of the Warrior Apes (2017) - Natural history documentary special. Produced by Keo Films for Discovery. Producer/Director: James Reed
- Thailand: Earth's Tropical Paradise (2016) - 3-part natural history documentary series for BBC Two. Produced by BBC Natural History Unit. Narrated by Sophie Okonedo. Series Producer: Steve Cole; Producers: Steve Cole, Lara Bickerton and James Hemming
- Gorilla Family and Me (2015-2016) - Natural history documentary series for BBC Two. Produced by BBC Natural History Unit. Presented by Gordon Buchanan. Executive Producers: Tim Martin and Ted Oakes; Series Producer: David Johnson
- India: Nature's Wonderland (2015) - Natural history documentary series for BBC and PBS. Presented by Liz Bonnin, Freida Pinto and Jon Gupta. Series Producer: Ben Southwell
- Wild Costa Rica (2015) – Natural history documentary for Animal Planet; Produced by Warehouse 51 Productions; Producer/Director: Ian Marsh
- Return of the Giant Killers: Africa's Lion Kings (2015-2016) – Natural history documentary for BBC Natural World. Produced by Icon Films; Producer/ Director: Steve Gooder
- Timeshift: Castles – Britain's Fortified History (2014) - History documentary for BBC4. Producer/Director: Ben Southwell
- Africa's Fishing Leopards (2015-2016) – Natural history documentary for BBC Natural World. Produced by "Icon Films". Producer/ Director: Steve Gooder
- The Man Who Turned into a Sofa (2014) - BBC Drama on 4. Written by Polly Peters, Andrew Fusek Peters and Rosalind Jana Peters; Produced by Tim Dee
- Beavers Behaving Badly (2014-2015) - Natural history documentary for BBC Natural World. Produced by BBC Natural History Unit. Producer/Director: David Johnson
- Africa's Giant Killers (2014-2015) - Natural history documentary for BBC Natural World. Produced by Icon Films. Producer/ Director: Rob Sullivan
- Ultimate Honey Badger (2014) - Natural history documentary for National Geographic International. Produced by Earth Touch, Durban. Producer/Director: Jess Reiss
- Get Rich or Die Mining (2013) - An adventure documentary for National Geographic International. Produced by RDF Television. Producer/ Director: David Johnson
- Leopards: 21st Century Cats (2013-2014) - Natural history documentary for BBC Natural World. Produced by Parthenon Entertainment/Sky Vision. Director: Simon Nash
- "Dino Crab (2013) - Natural History documentary for National Geographic International. Produced by Parthenon Entertainment/Sky Vision. Director: Phil Coles
- Shocking Sharks (2013) - Natural history documentary for National Geographic International. Produced by Parthenon Entertainment/Sky Vision. Director: Phil Coles
- Wild Hawaii (2012) - Natural history documentary for Animal Planet. Produced by Parthenon Entertainment/Sky Vision. Director: Simon Nash
- Wild Appalachia (2012) - Natural history documentary for Animal Planet. Produced by Parthenon Entertainment/ Sky Vision. Director: Simon Nash
- Walking Through History (2013) - History documentary for Channel 4. Produced by Wildfire TV. Series Producer: David Johnson; Presenter: Tony Robinson
- Jungle Gremlins of Java (2011-2012) - Natural history documentary for BBC Natural World. Produced by "Icon Films. Producer/ Director: Steve Gooder
- Serengeti – Dangerous Journey (in production 2011) – Natural History documentary for National Geographic International. Produced by Parthenon Entertainment. Director: Kate Dart
- Nordic Wild (2011) – Natural history series for National Geographic International and Animal Planet. Produced by Parthenon Entertainment
- Chimps of the Lost Gorge (2011) – Natural history documentary for BBC Natural World and Animal Planet. Produced and directed by Verity White.
- Clash of the Tiger Queens (2010) – Natural history documentary for broadcast on National Geographic International. Produced by Amanda Theunissen for Parthenon Entertainment, Directed by Melanie Price.
- Secrets of the Arabian Nights (2010) – History documentary. Directed by Mark Fielder and Lizzie White for Quickfire Media for BBC 4/2.
- Miracle in the Marshes of Iraq (2010-2011) – Natural history documentary. Directed by David Johnson and produced by Aqua Vita Films for BBC Natural World.
- Kingdom of the Forest (2010) – Natural history documentary for National Geographic International. Produced by Parthenon Entertainment. Director: Joanne Lunt
- Japan's Hidden Secrets (2009) – Natural history documentary. Parthenon Entertainment Ltd. for the National Geographic Channel; Produced by Amanda Theunissen; Directed by Dan Habershon Butcher.
- Wild Russia (2009) – 6-part natural history series. Parthenon Entertainment Ltd. for the National Geographic Channel and Animal Planet. Series Produced by Amanda Theunissen; Directed by Dan Habershon-Butcher.
- Snow Monkeys (2009) – Natural history documentary. BBC Natural World and Animal Planet. Produced and Directed by Ian Gray; Series Produced by Tim Martin
- Humpbacks: from Fire to Ice (2008) – Natural history documentary. Kohola Pty Ltd, Queensland for the Australian Broadcasting Corporation and National Geographic. Produced and Directed by Ross Isaacs; Narrated by David Attenborough; music co-composed with Barnaby Taylor
- Lobo – the Wolf that Changed America (2007-2008) – Natural history documentary. Brian Leith Productions for BBC Natural World and WNET. Produced by Brian Leith; Directed by Steve Gooder; Narrated by David Attenborough
- SS Great Britain (2008) – Television, Radio and Internet advertising campaign. Fanatic Design for ITV
- A Man among Bears (2008) – Natural history documentary. Aqua Vita Films for Five and National Geographic Channel. Produced by Bernard Walton; Directed by Dominick French
- Athens – the Truth about Democracy (2007); 2-part history documentary series. Lion TV] for Channel 4. Directed by Timothy Copestake; Presented by Bettany Hughes
- Lilacs (2007); Russian feature film on the life of Sergei Rachmaninoff. Additional music.
- Fresh Fishing – the Carp (2007) - Natural history documentary. Swim Films Ltd for commercial DVD release. Produced and Directed by Moira Mann
- A Man Among Wolves (2007) – Natural History documentary. Aqua Vita Films for Five and National Geographic. Produced by Bernard Walton; music co-composed with Barnaby Taylor
- WorldSkills Olympics 2011 (2007) – Signature Theme. VET, London
- Peter Scott – a Passion for Nature (2006) – Natural history documentary. Available Light Productions for BBC Two. Narrated by David Attenborough; Produced and directed by Sarah Pitt
- Ancient Worlds Brought to Life (2006) – 3-part history documentary series for commercial DVD release, Doordarshan Television for Reader's Digest. Directed by Harriet Smith

=== Orchestrator and conductor (1985–2023) ===
- Spy in the Ocean eps 1 and 2 (2023) - Natural history series for BBC One with music composed by Will Gregory. BBC National Orchestra of Wales, Hoddinott Hall, Cardiff; conducted by William Goodchild
- Serengeti series 3 (2023) - Natural history series for BBC One with music composed by Will Gregory. BBC Concert Orchestra, Angel Studios, London; conducted by William Goodchild
- Voyage of a Sea-god (2019) - Commercial double-album release, Hyperion Records. Laurence Perkins, solo bassoon, with City of Bristol Symphony Orchestra conducted by William Goodchild
- What They Had (2017) - Feature film with music composed by Danny Mulhern. Orchestrated by William Goodchild
- Interplay Series: Bill Evans and the Impressionists (2014) featuring the Kate Williams Trio with Oli Hayhurst – double bass, Tristan Mailliot – drums and conductor William Goodchild, Milton Court Concert Hall, London
- Monsters Dark Continent (2014) – Feature film with music composed by Neil Davidge. Bristol Ensemble, Christchurch Studios, Bristol; orchestrated and conducted by William Goodchild
- Heart (2013) - Documentary feature with music composed by Justin Nicholls. Bristol Ensemble, Christchurch Studios, Bristol; orchestrated and conducted by William Goodchild
- African Cats (2013) – 3-part natural history series for Disney Nature with music composed by David Poore. Bristol Ensemble, Real World Studios; orchestrated and conducted by William Goodchild
- Wild Arabia (2013) - 3-part natural history series for BBC with music composed by Barnaby Taylor. BBC Concert Orchestra, Abbey Road Studios, London; conducted by William Goodchild
- Frail (2012) – Feature film with music composed by David Poore. Bristol Ensemble, Christchurch Studios, Bristol; orchestrated and conducted by William Goodchild
- The Truth About Lions (2011) – 2-part natural history series for BBC with music composed by David Poore. Bristol Ensemble, Christchurch Studios, Bristol; orchestrated and conducted by William Goodchild
- Mountain Gorilla (2010) – 3-part natural history series for BBC with music composed by David Poore. Bristol Ensemble, Christchurch Studios, Bristol; orchestrated and conducted by William Goodchild
- The Man Who Stopped the Desert (2010) – One-hour feature documentary with music composed by David Poore. Bristol Ensemble, Christchurch Studios, Bristol; orchestrated and conducted by William Goodchild
- The Great Rift (2010) – 3-part natural history series for BBC with music composed by Barnaby Taylor. BBC Concert Orchestra, Abbey Road Studios, London; orchestrated and conducted by William Goodchild
- Nature's Great Events (2009) – 6-part natural history series for BBC1 narrated by Sir David Attenborough with music composed by Barnaby Taylor and Ben Salisbury. BBC Concert Orchestra, Abbey Road Studios, London; orchestrated and conducted by William Goodchild
- Nature's Great Events Live (2009) – Concert performance featuring footage from the series with live orchestral accompaniment from the BBC Concert Orchestra and narrated by Sir David Attenborough. Music composed by Barnaby Taylor and Ben Salisbury; orchestrated and conducted by William Goodchild
- Music and Chance (2009) – Concert given by the BBC Concert Orchestra at the Queen Elizabeth Hall with pieces by Andy Sheppard and Barnaby Taylor. Orchestrated by William Goodchild
- Drawer of Dreams (2009) – Concert performance featuring Emerald Ensemble and Cirque Bijou. Orchestrated by William Goodchild, conducted by Charles Hazlewood
- Catching the Impossible (2009) – 8-part angling series with music composed by David Poore. Emerald Ensemble, Christchurch Studios, Bristol; orchestrated and conducted by William Goodchild
- Wild China (2008) – 6-part natural history series for BBC Two with music composed by Barnaby Taylor. BBC Concert Orchestra, Angel Studios, London; orchestrated and conducted by William Goodchild
- Ganges (May 2007) - 3-part natural history series for BBC Two with music composed by Barnaby Taylor; Royal Philharmonic Orchestra, Maida Vale Studios, London; orchestrated and conducted by William Goodchild
- Life on Earth – an Orchestral Suite by Edward Williams (April 2007) – Commercial Compact Disc release. Bristol Ensemble at St George's Bristol; orchestrated and conducted by William Goodchild
- Europe – A Natural History (2005) – 4-part natural history series for BBC Two and ORF (broadcaster) with music composed by Barnaby Taylor. BBC Concert Orchestra, Angel Studios, London; orchestrated and conducted by William Goodchild
- Journey of Life (September 2004) – 5-part natural history series for BBC Two with music composed by Barnaby Taylor; BBC Concert Orchestra, Angel Recording Studios, London; orchestrated and conducted by William Goodchild
- Holy Cow (2004) natural history documentary for the Discovery Channel with music composed by Barnaby Taylor. Emerald Ensemble, St Albans Church, Weston-super-Mare; orchestrated and conducted by William Goodchild
- Wild New World (2002) - 6-part natural history series for BBC Two with music composed by Barnaby Taylor. Series Producer: Miles Barton; Royal Philharmonic Orchestra, Angel Studios, London; orchestrated and conducted by William Goodchild
- The Guitarist: John Williams (1998) - Commercial album release for Sony Classical. London Metropolitan Orchestra, Air Lyndhurst Studios; conducted by William Goodchild
- John Williams: Echoes of London (1986) - Commercial album release for CBS Records recorded at CTS Lansdowne Studios. Conducted by William Goodchild
- Matador (1985) - Commercial album release for CBS Records with Tom Jones. Air Lyndhurst Studios; conducted by William Goodchild

== Music awards ==
- Chimp Empire, episode 1: Paradise, from the Netflix original series, was winner of the Wildscreen Panda Music Award 2024. It was also nominated for Composer at the Royal Television Society West of England Awards 2024.
- Surviving Paradise: A Family Tale, a Netflix original documentary, was nominated for Composer at the Royal Television Society West of England Awards 2023. It was also a Finalist in the Original Music Score category at the Jackson Wild Media Awards 2022.
- Tibet: Roof of the World (IFA Media) won the Composer category at the Royal Television Society West of England Awards 2021. It was also Finalist in the Best Original Composition in Film and TV Titles category at the Music+Sound Awards 2021.
- Hippos: Africa's River Giants (BBC) was nominated for Composer at the Royal Television Society West of England Awards 2020. Music composed by William Goodchild.
- Rise of the Warrior Apes (Discovery) was nominated for Composer at the Royal Television Society West of England Awards 2018. Music composed by William Goodchild.
- Jago: A Life Underwater (BBC, Netflix) was nominated for Composer at the Royal Television Society West of England Awards 2017. It was also nominated for the Wildscreen Panda Music Award 2017. Music composed by William Goodchild.
- Seeing Him was winner of Best Scoreat the Hollywood International Moving Pictures Film Festival 2018. Music composed by William Goodchild.
- As orchestrator and conductor, William Goodchild was a key contributor to the soundtrack of Wild China: Heart of Dragon which was awarded an Emmy for Music and Sound in September 2009.

== Personal life ==
In the 1980s, William Goodchild met Rachel Sarah Swan, a surface pattern designer, formerly a Montessori teacher. The two were married by William's father in Clifton College Chapel Bristol, England in 1990. William and Rachel have two daughters: Rosa Fay Goodchild, a graduate of the University of South Wales, who is a Photographer and Videographer, and Eleanor Goodchild, who studied Social Sciences at Cardiff University and who works as a Business Performance Manager at ISS World.
