= Surviving Paradise =

Surviving Paradise may refer to:

- Surviving Paradise (2000 film), an Iranian-American family drama film
- Surviving Paradise: A Family Tale, a 2022 British nature documentary about animals in the Kalahari Desert
- Surviving Paradise (TV series), an upcoming British-produced television reality competition series with an American cast
