= The Green Planet (TV series) =

2022 British nature documentary television series on plants

- Genre: Nature documentary
- Creative director: Mike Gunton
- Presented by: David Attenborough
- Music by: Benji Merrison, Will Slater
- Country of origin: United Kingdom
- Original language: English
- No. of series: 1
- No. of episodes: 5

Production
- Running time: 292 min
- Production company: BBC Studios Natural History Unit

Original release
- Network: BBC One
- Release: 9 January – 6 February 2022

The Green Planet is a 2022 British nature documentary series on plants and their relationship with animals and the environment. It was a co-commission from the BBC and PBS and produced by the BBC Studios Natural History Unit in co-production with Open University, CCTV-9, Bilibili, ZDF, France Télévisions and NHK. It was narrated and presented by David Attenborough.

Utilising time-lapse photography, drones and specially designed camera rigs called "Triffids", the series aimed to show plant movements over prolonged periods, but sped up into real time. The series first aired on BBC One on 9 January 2022, and consisted of five episodes. It was subsequently made available on demand on BBC iPlayer and was aired internationally on other networks.

Filming took three years to complete, and took place in 27 countries. Producer Paul Williams hired engineer Chris Field to develop new filmmaking technology for the series based on a prototype of the "Triffid" camera system in a Kickstarter video. Original music was composed by Benji Merrison and Will Slater. A tie-in augmented reality experience in London and an online content initiative were launched to promote the series.

The Green Planet was a ratings success in the United Kingdom, with its first episode drawing 5.4 million viewers. It also received positive reviews from critics, who noted its production quality, storytelling, and environmentalist themes. A Green Planet II sequel series is in development.

== Episodes ==
The series consists of five episodes, each based on a different theme and environment. Each episode ends with a segment on the methods and equipment used to capture the episode.

"Plants, whether they are enormous or microscopic, are the basis of all life, including ourselves. We depend upon them for every mouthful of food that we eat and every lungful of air that we breathe. The plants of our planet live remarkable lives, yet for the most part the secrets of their world have been hidden from us—until now."

— David Attenborough's opening words

No.	Title	Original release date	UK viewers (millions)
1	"Tropical Worlds"	9 January 2022	6.32
The first episode reveals the fiercely competitive lives of tropical plants.
2	"Water Worlds"	16 January 2022	5.53
The second instalment focuses on aquatic plants and their impact on marine environments.
3	"Seasonal Worlds"	23 January 2022	4.96
The third episode explores how different plant species adapt to seasonal changes in their environment.
4	"Desert Worlds"	30 January 2022	4.94
The fourth episode is centered on desert plants, and their adaptations to harsh environments.
5	"Human Worlds"	6 February 2022	5.17
The fifth and final episode is focused on the relationship between humans and plants. The negative environmental impact of human development, and the ways in which plants have adapted to these changes, is examined. The episode also looks at efforts to create urban green spaces and promote environmental responsibility. Efforts to preserve Hawaiian holokea and the Guassa Community Conservation Area are examined.

"Our relationship with plants has changed throughout history and now it must change again. We must now work with plants and make the world a little greener, a little wilder. If we do this, our future will be healthier, and safer, and happier. Plants are, after all, our most ancient allies, and together we can make this an even greener planet."

— David Attenborough, in closing

== Production ==
In January, the upcoming release of The Green Planet, a five-part documentary about the biodiversity of plant life narrated by David Attenborough was announced. The series was a collaboration between PBS and BBC Studios Natural History Unit. It was co-produced by Open University, CCTV-9, Bilibili, ZDF, France Télévisions and NHK. The series was considered to be a "passion project" for Attenborough. In an interview with The Irish News, Attenborough said that "The world is green—it's an apt name [for the series], the world is green. And yet people's understanding about plants, except in a very kind of narrow way, has not kept up with that. I think this will bring it home."

Filming began in early 2019 and took over three years to complete. Filming took place in 27 countries, including Japan, Croatia, Costa Rica and the United States. The series, which was presented from a "plant's-eye view", was filmed using time-lapse photography, to show the slow progress of plant movements. One cactus was filmed continuously in time-lapse for three years, making it the longest time-lapse study undertaken by the BBC. A number of technologies, including drone-mounted cameras and motion-control robotics were used to capture the slow movements, defense mechanisms and growth of plants. Two FPV racing drone pilots were hired to film parts of the series, as drones were faster and more eco-friendly than filming from helicopters. Creative director Mike Gunton explained that the racing drone pilots had "[the] dexterous skill to be able to operate those drones in the most incredibly micro-detailed way."

Specialized camera rigs called "Triffids" were developed for the series. The "Triffids" were created by former military engineer Chris Field, who developed them to capture plant movements in the wild. Field had been inspired to develop timelapse camera technology by watching the BBC documentary Planet Earth. Field also developed robotic rigs which could move freely around a plant while capturing it in timelapse. Producer Paul Williams discovered Fields' camera work by seeing a timelapse of Venus flytraps he had made that was linked on Kickstarter. Based on that video, Williams hired him to develop new technologies for The Green Planet. Williams stated that the name of the rigs came from John Wyndham's 1951 science fiction novel The Day of the Triffids, about a species of mobile, carnivorous plants.

It was the first documentary on plant life Attenborough had created since Plants Behaving Badly in 2013. In the fourth episode of Green Planet, Attenborough revisited a creosote bush (larrea tridentata) in the Sonoran Desert of Arizona which had previously been featured in The Living Planet, a series which he filmed in 1982. The bush had grown only a quarter of an inch in the intervening forty years.

Original music was composed by Benji Merrison and Will Slater.

== Premiere ==
The series premiered at the IMAX Theatre in Glasgow, Scotland on 31 October 2021. The premiere took place during the 2021 United Nations Climate Change Conference. English actress Maisie Williams delivered a speech introducing the first episode. Attenborough also spoke at the summit, and received a standing ovation.

The series was scheduled to debut in the US on 6 July 2022 on PBS, to air weekly.

== Broadcast ==
=== British television ===
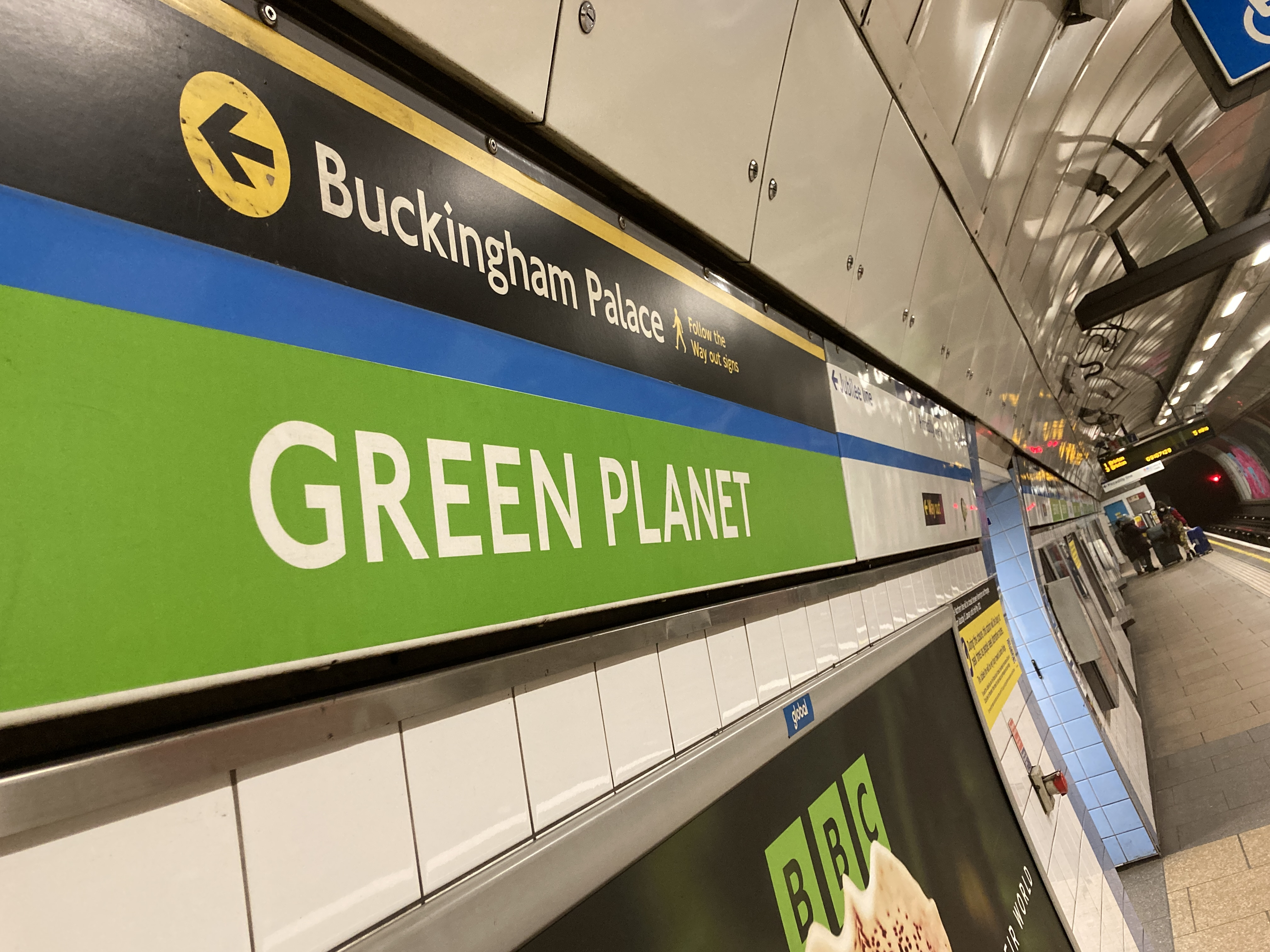
Green Planet promotion at Green Park tube station, London

The series was first broadcast on 9 January 2022 on BBC One. Subsequent episodes were aired weekly on the channel. Episodes were also made available via the video-on-demand service BBC iPlayer after each broadcast.

=== International ===
In 2021, BBC Studios pre-sold the series to a large number of overseas networks, including Nine Network in Australia, TVNZ in New Zealand, Radio Canada, DR in Denmark, ERR in Estonia, LTV in Latvia, LRT in Lithuania, Movistar Plus+ in Spain, NRK in Norway, Friday! in Russia, and RTVS in Slovakia. It was presold to BBC Earth in Africa, Asia, Poland, MENA, Turkey, Canada and the Nordic countries.

On 18 January 2022, it was announced that the series would be broadcast weekly in the United States on PBS, from 6 July 2022 to 3 August 2022.

== Reception ==
=== Critical reception ===
The series received widespread critical praise for its cinematography, technological advances, narration, presentation, storytelling and environmental message. On Rotten Tomatoes, the series has an approval rating of 100% based on 5 reviews.

Harry Cockburn of The Independent praised the show for bringing "an incredible level of drama, insight and imaginative presentation" to its subject matter. Carol Midgley of The Times also gave the series five stars, saying that the series at times felt "like a horror flick" and at other times was "almost a plant porno." Anita Singh, in a review for The Telegraph, also compared some of the show's imagery to that of horror films, and gave the series four out of five stars. It received five-star reviews in the Financial Times and The Guardian. Natalie Bennett, writing for The House, praised the series overall, but criticized it for relying on nature documentary tropes of conflict and struggle, and not also portraying examples of interspecies cooperation.

The series was also praised for raising awareness of environmental issues and climate change. Critics commented on the environmental message of the series, which encouraged the conservation and appreciation of plant life. Steve Clarke, writing for Variety, considered it to be an example of "a new willingness from TV types to put uncomfortable truths regarding environmental damage alongside feel-good shots of beautiful beasts and pristine landscapes." An editorial piece in The Guardian described the series as "[taking] aim at plant blindness" by demonstrating the importance of plant life.

The series was nominated for the Cinema for Peace International Green Film Award in 2024.

=== Audience response ===
The first episode of the series received an average of 4.5 million viewers in the UK, peaking at 5.4 million.

== Related exhibitions and initiatives ==
BBC Studios created the Green Planet AR Experience, inspired by the series, with funding from the British government's 5G Create competition. The month-long augmented reality installation opened at Piccadilly Circus on February 11, and is scheduled to remain open until March 9, 2022. It is a collaboration between BBC, 5G network provider EE Limited and Factory 42.

In February 2022, the BBC Natural History Unit and the Moondance Foundation launched #OurGreenPlanet, a conservation initiative inspired by the series.
