= Wild Brazil =

- Also known as: Brazil Gone Wild
- Genre: Nature documentary
- Narrated by: Stephen Mangan
- Composer: David Mitcham
- Country of origin: United Kingdom
- Original language: English
- No. of series: 1
- No. of episodes: 3

Production
- Executive producer: Tim Scoones
- Producers: Joe Stevens; Adam White
- Production location: Brazil
- Running time: 50 minutes
- Production company: BBC Natural History Unit

Original release
- Network: BBC Two, BBC Two HD
- Release: 14 January – 16 January 2014

Related
- Wild Arabia; Wild West: America's Great Frontier

Wild Brazil is a British nature documentary series, first broadcast on BBC Two and BBC Two HD in January 2014. Produced by the BBC Natural History Unit and narrated by Stephen Mangan, the three-part series focuses on three animal families, one of tufted capuchins, one of giant otters and one of South American coatis, but also looks at other animals like jaguars. Each episode is followed by a ten-minute Wild Brazil Diaries segment, illustrating the techniques used to film a particular subject.

The series aired in the United States on Discovery Channel, under the title Brazil Gone Wild.

The series forms part of the Natural History Unit's "Continents" strand. It was preceded by Wild Arabia in 2013 and followed by Wild West: America's Great Frontier in 2016.

== Episodes ==
=== 1. "A Dangerous World" ===
UK broadcast 14 January 2014

Introducing a family of tufted capuchins that lives on the cliffs of Piauí (Serra da Capivara National Park), a family of giant otters that make their holts on the banks of the Pantanal and a family of South American coatis that lives in the 'vasantes' of the southern Pantanal. Each family has newborn offspring that are taking their first steps during a brief pause between seasonal extremes.

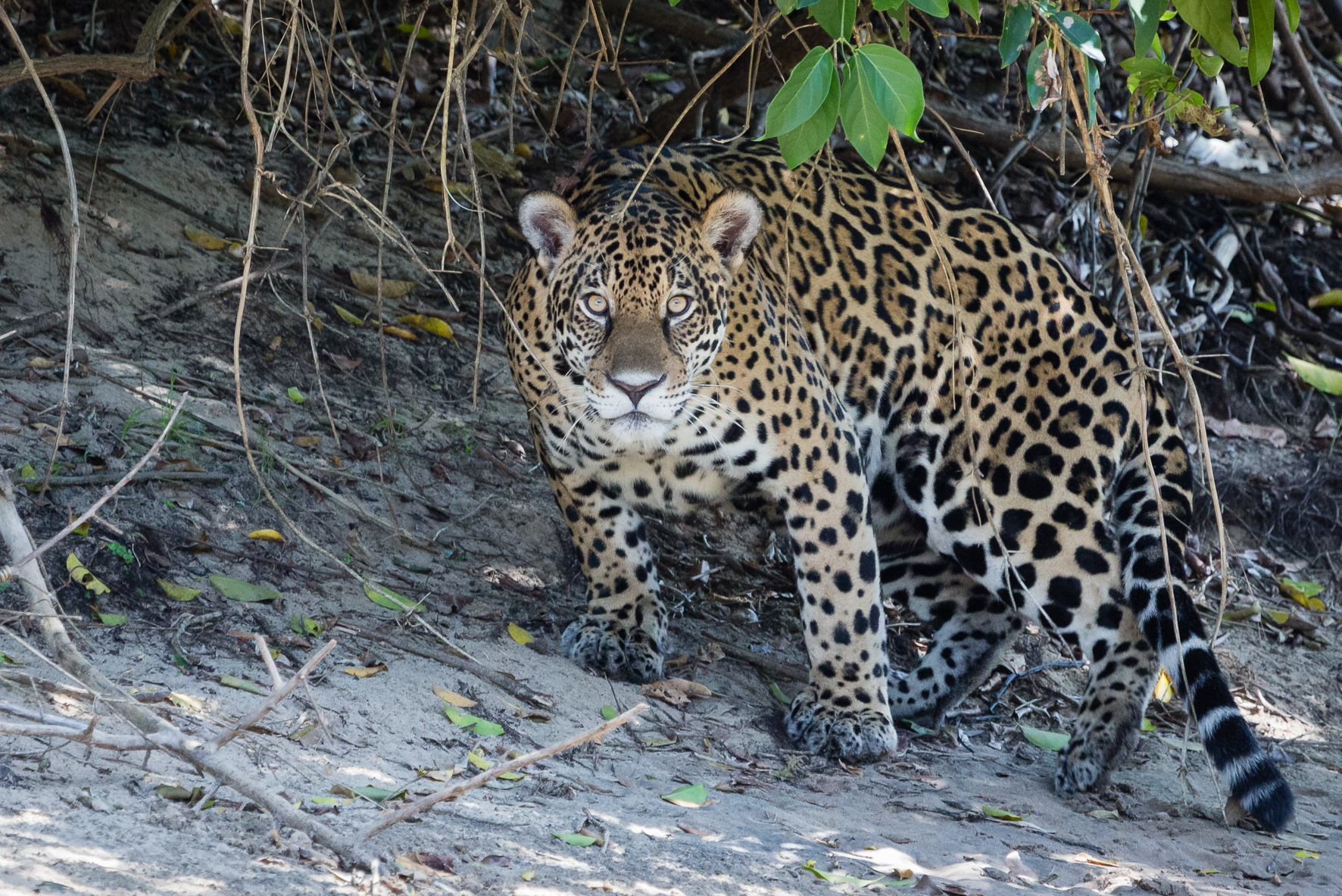
A jaguar on the banks of the Pantanal

=== 2. "Facing the Flood" ===
UK broadcast 15 January 2014

Five months of monsoon in the Andes and Amazon rainforest cause mountain streams to swell and start a cascade of flooding, spectacularly affecting Brazilian wildlife. Capuchin monkeys on the cliffs make the most of a few weeks of abundant vegetation, but their offspring must quickly learn to become less dependent on mother and fit into the group hierarchy. The otters enjoy plentiful fish, but are hunted by caiman and jaguars. The coatis must retreat to higher ground as their lowland prairies flood, but feast on lungfish in pools and shallow patches.

=== 3. "Enduring the Drought" ===
UK broadcast 16 January 2014

A fierce drought culminates in huge and ferocious fires. The capuchin monkeys, giant otters, coatis and jaguars are proving their extreme survival skills while looking for mates with which to breed in time for the next generation to be born just as the good times return.
