= Bristol Ensemble =

English chamber orchestra, founded 1994

Background information
- Origin: Bristol, England
- Genre: Classical music
- Occupation: Chamber orchestra
- Years active: 1994–present
- Members: Founder: Roger Huckle
- Website: https://bristolensemble.com/

The Bristol Ensemble, formerly the Emerald Ensemble, is a professional chamber orchestra, based in Bristol, England. The ensemble has been in existence since 1994, when it was formed as a musicians' collective by violinist Roger Huckle. Their repertoire includes classical, popular, jazz and contemporary music. The size of the group depends on the programmes being performed and can range from trios to a full complement of 70 or so musicians.

The Bristol Ensemble tours regularly throughout the South West of England and further afield, with a large number of performances in Bristol at venues including the Bristol Beacon, St Georges, Brandon Hill and Bristol Cathedral. The Ensemble give approximately 120 concerts a year and work with soloists.

The ensemble regularly accompanies screenings of silent movies as part of the annual Slapstick Festival at Bristol Beacon. They regularly record for television and film, including much work for the BBC Natural History Unit and they have produced several CDs of their work.

== Artistic collaborations ==
Roni Size Reprazent Live at the Colston Hall with William Goodchild and the Bristol Ensemble

Bristol Ensemble has collaborated with a range of internationally recognised soloists and performers, including Nicola Benedetti, percussionist Dame Evelyn Glennie, pianist Freddy Kempf and Peter Donohoe, violinist Chloë Hanslip, cellist Matthew Barley, soprano Emma Kirkby, bass-baritone Willard White, saxophonist Andy Sheppard, clarinetist Emma Johnson, Lesley Garrett, Natalie Lomeiko, Wayne Marshall, Leon Bosch, Roderick Williams, Viv McLean, Mamadou Cissokho and Gabriel Prokofiev. In autumn 2009 they performed with William Goodchild and Roni Size, and also with Crippled Black Phoenix and the solo artist Joe Volk under the curation of Geoff Barrow.

Its collaborative work extends to choral music and opera. The ensemble serves as resident orchestra to If Opera, as well as numerous regional choirs and choral societies.

== Preludes Music ==
The organisation also operates Preludes Music, established in 2009 by Penny Rawlings, an educational initiative providing sustained, inclusive, high-quality musical opportunities to over 5,000 children each year. Its activities include weekly classroom lessons, small group and 1-2-1 instrumental tuition, orchestras, choirs, holiday clubs and performances involving professional musicians. Its model includes sustained engagement across successive school years, enabling pupils to develop their musical skills over time.

Preludes Music's annual concerts bring together pupils from participating schools to perform music learned throughout the academic year. Venues have included St Mary Redcliffe Church and St George's Bristol.

Projects have also connected music education with local history, cultural diversity and composition. In 2024, Preludes Music ran the collaborative composition project 'Symphony of the World', involving children from three local schools, a community poetry group, professional musicians and tutors. The resulting four-movement work drew on musical traditions represented in Bristol's communities and was performed at Trinity Arts Centre and St George's Bristol. Participants included Mamadou Cissokho, Sunto Susso, Bristol Reggae Orchestra, Troyka and composer and conductor William Goodchild.

== Discography ==
- Live at Colston Hall (2015) Roni Size & Reprazent with William Goodchild and The Emerald Ensemble
