= South Pacific (TV series) =

- Series title card from UK broadcast
- Also known as: Wild Pacific
- Genre: Nature documentary
- Narrated by: Benedict Cumberbatch (BBC); Mike Rowe (Discovery)
- Composer: David Mitcham
- Country of origin: United Kingdom
- Original language: English
- No. of episodes: 6

Production
- Executive producer: Fiona Pitcher
- Running time: 50 minutes
- Production companies: BBC Natural History Unit; Discovery Channel

Original release
- Network: BBC Two
- Release: 10 May – 14 June 2009

Related
- Wild China; Madagascar

South Pacific (Wild Pacific in the US) is a British nature documentary series from the BBC Natural History Unit, which began airing on BBC Two on 10 May 2009. The six-part series surveys the natural history of the islands of the South Pacific region, including many of the coral atolls and New Zealand. It was filmed entirely in high-definition. South Pacific was co-produced by the Discovery Channel and the series producer was Huw Cordey. It is narrated by Benedict Cumberbatch. Filming took place over 18 months in a variety of remote locations around the Pacific including: Anuta (Solomon Islands), Banks Islands, French Frigate Shoals, Papua New Guinea, Palmyra, Kingman Reef, Tuvalu, Palau, Caroline Islands, Tuamotus and Tanna Island in Vanuatu.

On 6 May 2009, BBC Worldwide released a short clip of big wave surfer Dylan Longbottom surfing in slow motion, high-definition footage as a preview of the series, attracting positive reactions on YouTube.

The series was released on DVD and Blu-ray Disc on 15 June 2009. At the end of each fifty-minute episode, a ten-minute featurette takes a behind-the-scenes look at the challenges of filming the series.

The series was released by Discovery International in the USA under the title Wild Pacific, with narration provided by Mike Rowe.

The series forms part of the Natural History Unit's "Continents" strand. It was preceded by Wild China in 2008 and followed by Madagascar in 2011.

== Episodes ==
=== 1. "Ocean of Islands" ===
UK broadcast 10 May 2009, 2.49 million viewers (9.2% audience share)

The opening episode presents an overview of the natural history of the region, introducing some of the themes that are explored in more detail in later programmes. The South Pacific covers a vast area, and less than 1% is land, ranging from the Hawaiian Islands north of the equator to New Zealand in the south. On Macquarie Island, the most southerly outpost before Antarctica, springtime sees the arrival of huge numbers of elephant seals. Aerial footage shows the entire world population of royal penguins, which nest here in a single colony. Cold ocean currents flow all the way to the Galápagos Islands, 8000 miles away, enabling sea lions and penguins to survive on the equator. Isolation has enabled the region's wildlife to evolve in unusual ways. On Metoma, robber crabs, the world's largest terrestrial invertebrates, are filmed massing at night to feed on coconuts. On Hawaii, the most isolated archipelago of all, the caterpillars have turned carnivorous. There is an incredible diversity of human cultures and customs too, despite colonisation taking place relatively recently. The men of Pentecost Island leap from timber scaffold towers with only a vine tied to their ankles to break their falls. On small islands such as Anuta, people have fostered strong communities and sustainable hunting, farming and fishing practices to make up for the limited availability of food. The story of Easter Island, where a whole civilization brought about their own downfall through over-exploitation of their resources, is a lesson from history.

=== 2. "Castaways" ===
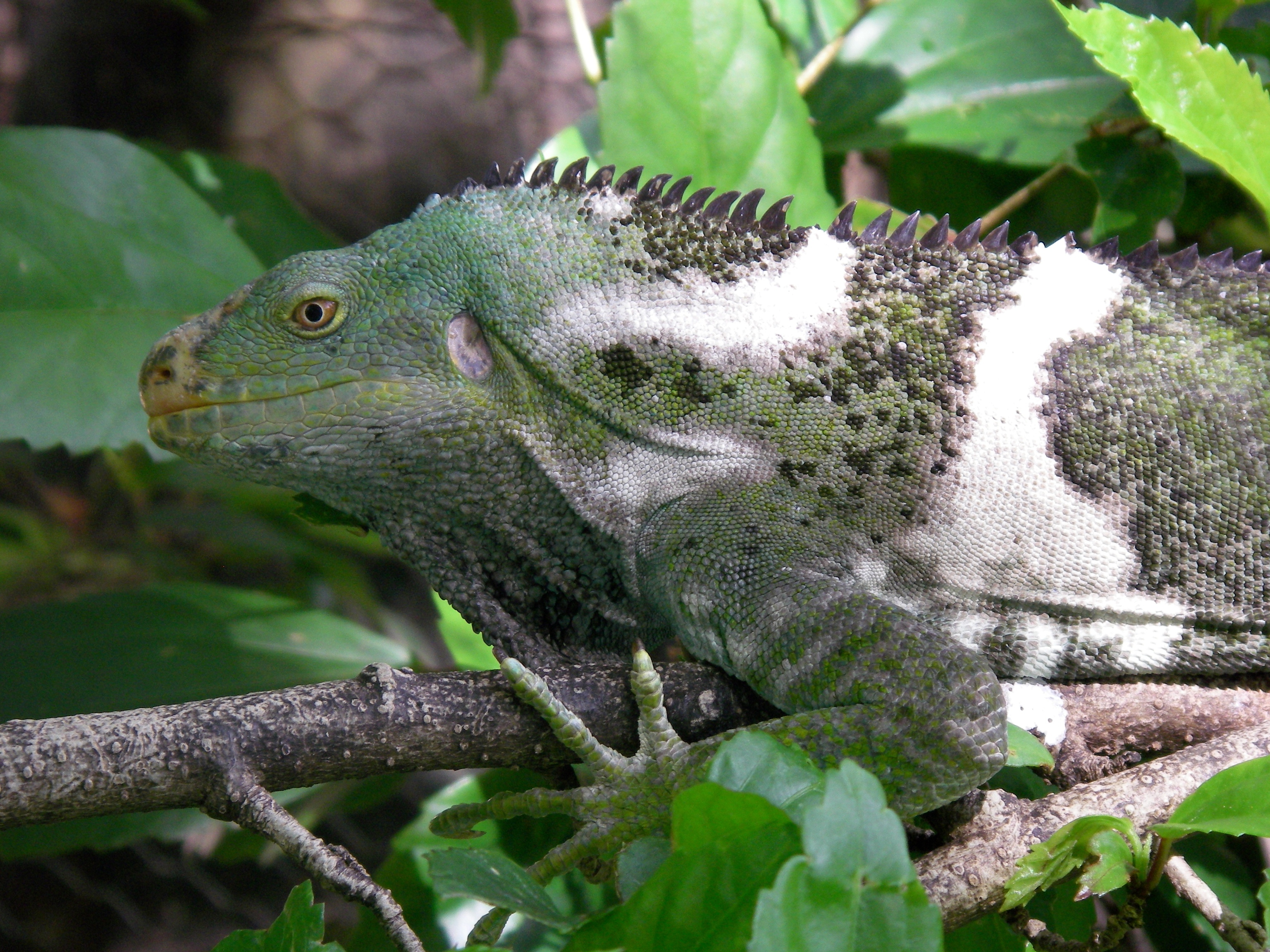
The recently discovered Fijian crested iguana caused scientists to reconsider how terrestrial species colonise new islands

UK broadcast 17 May 2009, 2.58 million viewers (9.6% audience share)

The second episode looks at how plants, animals and humans colonised even the most remote islands. Most pioneers came from the west, with New Guinea acting as the launch pad. The saltwater crocodile is one species which managed to swim the 60-mile crossing to the next island group, the Solomons. The mass spawning of groupers on a Solomon Island reef releases millions of eggs, which drift on ocean currents to establish new populations. The activity allows grey reef sharks to snatch a few distracted groupers. Few animals made it to Fiji, Tonga and Samoa, 1000 miles further east. Fruit bats were the only mammals to cross the ocean divide, but smaller animals were carried here by cyclones and jet stream winds. In the absence of ground predators, invertebrates have reached monstrous proportions. Fijian crested iguanas are thought to have floated here on rafts of vegetation. Seabirds have made the crossing to French Polynesia, where their rich guano helped fertilise barbed seeds stuck to their feathers and turn barren coral atolls into fertile groves. One plant needs no such help. Coconuts can survive drifting for two months at sea and lay roots into bare sand. Before the arrival of humans, fewer than 500 species colonised Hawaii in 30 million years. Once established, they evolved into countless new varieties. The story of human colonisation is no less remarkable. The ancestors of modern Polynesians, most probably Lapitas of Southeast Asia, arrived in Fiji 3,500 years ago and Hawaii 2,000 years ago.

=== 3. "Endless Blue" ===
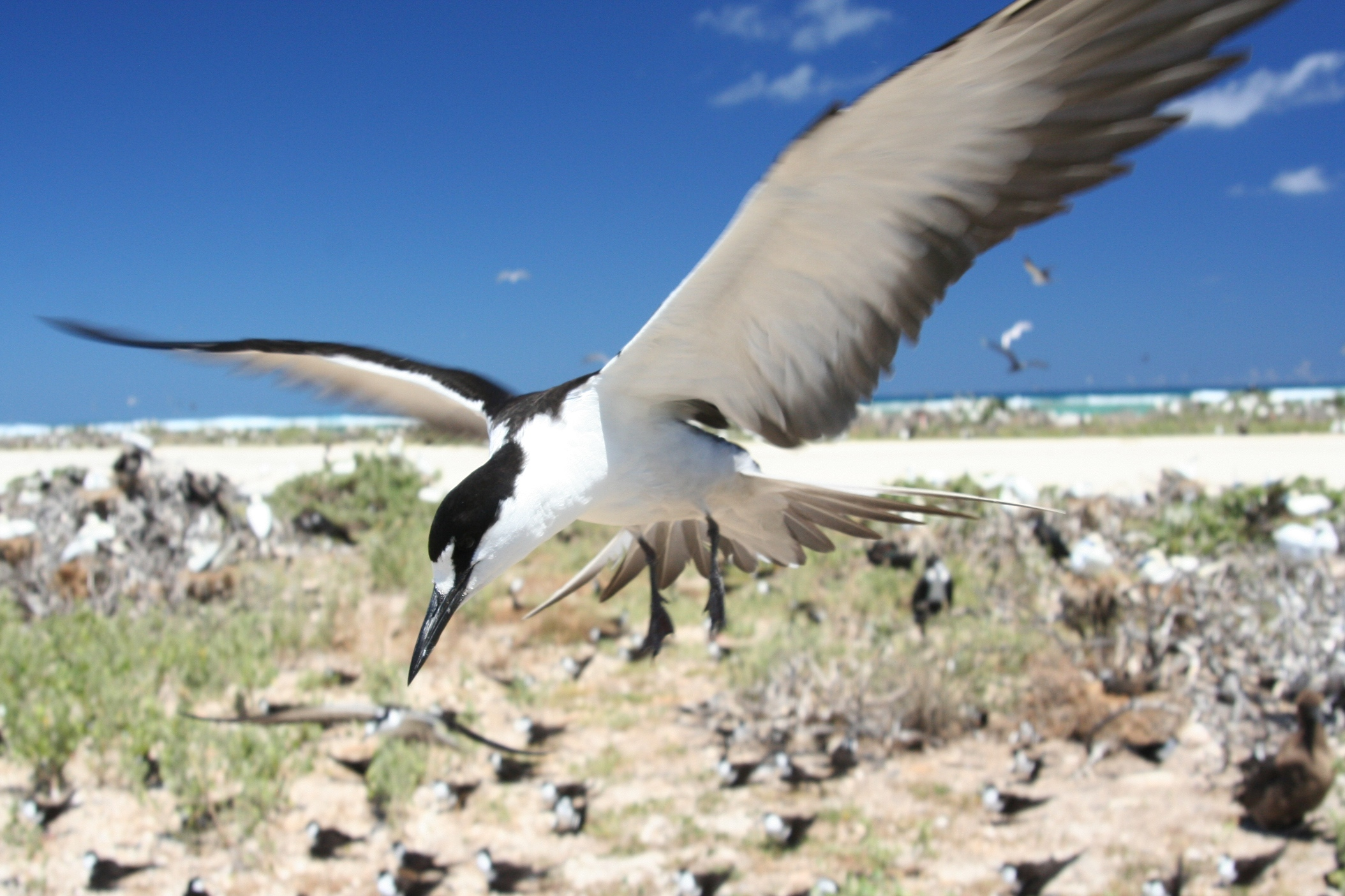
A sooty tern flies over a seabird colony on French Frigate Shoals

UK broadcast 24 May 2009, 1.42 million viewers (5.3% audience share)

The third episode begins in the tropics, where a white sperm whale calf stays close to its mother. The 19th-century story of the Essex, with its whalemen stranded in their lifeboats after a sperm whale attack is used to illustrate the difficulty of surviving in the open ocean. The currents that circle the South Pacific support huge shoals and an incredible variety of life, but much of the centre is an ocean desert. Nutrients are trapped at depth by the thermocline, making the windless surface clear but barren. Life can be tough for large predators. Some, including short-finned pilot whales, can dive to great depths to hunt squid. Others, such as rare oceanic whitetip sharks, track the whales hoping for scraps or a chance to seize a young calf. The waters around the Galápagos teem with life thanks to the cool, nutrient-rich Antarctic current. Underwater footage shows penguins, manta rays, and sea lions feeding. The sea lions work together to divide shoals into smaller bait balls, and blow bubbles into the reef to scare fish out. Seabirds are great ocean wanderers, but all must return to land to breed. On French Frigate Shoals, frigatebirds take sooty tern chicks from their nests, whilst offshore a dozen tiger sharks snatch any unfortunate black-footed albatross chicks that get their maiden flight wrong. Dusky dolphins and bull sperm whales are filmed in the waters off New Zealand, where rescue boats guide an exhausted whale beached in a shallow bay back out to sea.

=== 4. "Ocean of Volcanoes" ===
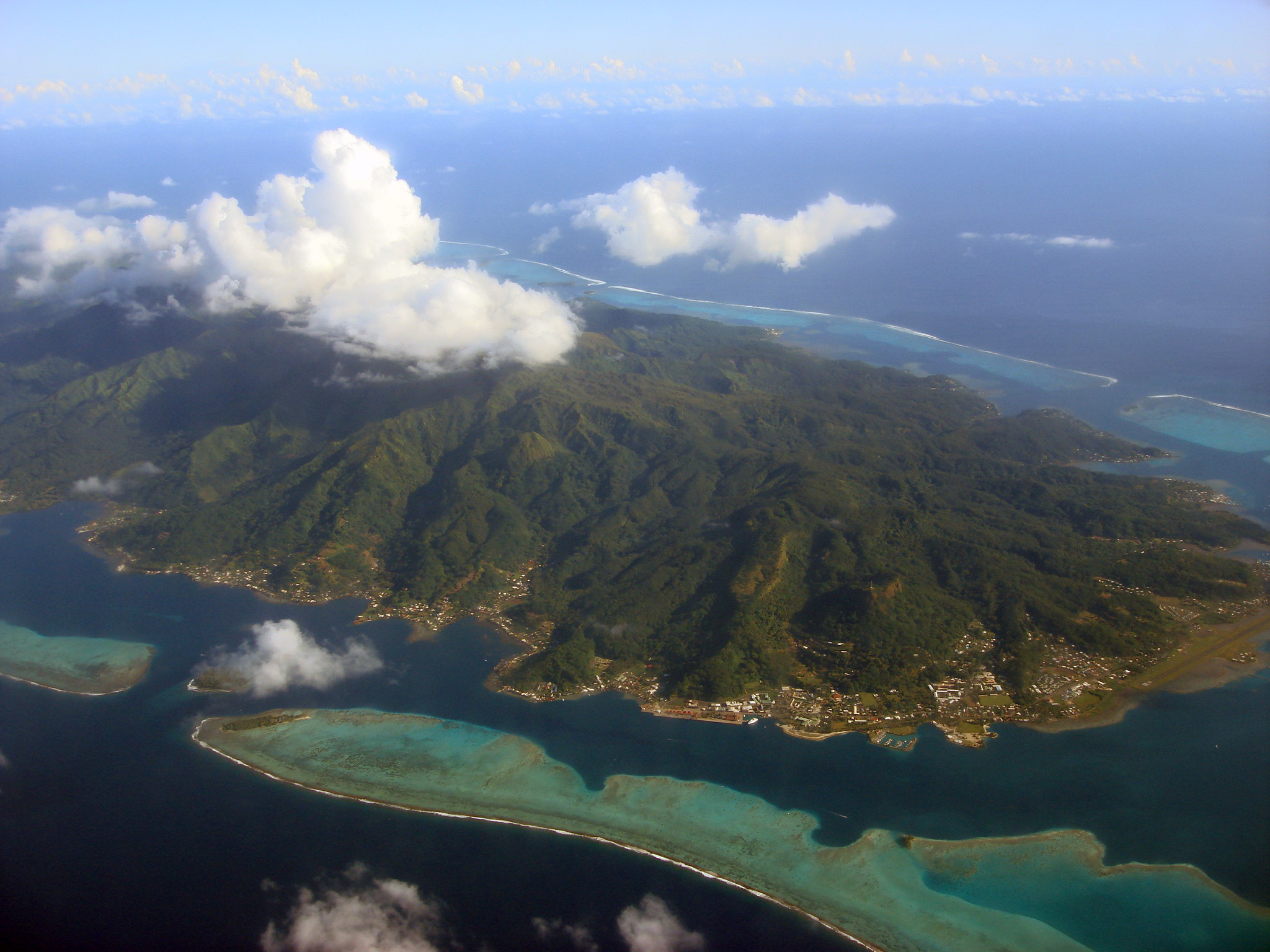
Like all South Pacific islands, the mountainous Society Islands are volcanic in origin

UK broadcast 31 May 2009, 2.29 million viewers (9.9% audience share)

The fourth episode opens with rare footage of Kavachi, an undersea volcano, erupting. The South Pacific islands are typically volcanic in origin, and those of Hawaii are among the youngest. Kilauea's rivers of lava flow directly into the sea, where they cool rapidly and release steam explosively. Pioneering species such as ōhia lehua colonise new land, putting roots down through the cracks into lava tubes where strange troglobites eke out their existence. In the Galápagos Islands, penguins take advantage of the cool shade of lava tubes to raise their chicks, but predatory Sally Lightfoot crabs lie in wait in the shadows. On the Solomons, megapodes bury their eggs in the warm ash of an active volcano, a natural incubator. Aerial photography of Mauna Kea, the Society Islands, Bora Bora and Rangiroa shows how erosion changes the character of volcanic islands over time. Eventually they sink back into the sea, leaving behind coral atolls and sheltered lagoons. Channels between ocean and lagoon attract feeding manta rays. The region's coral reefs are the richest in the world-–the pristine Kingman Reef, a sunken volcano, has over 200 kinds of coral alone. Underwater footage includes giant clams spawning, grey reef sharks hunting needlefish by night and a timelapse sequence of a Triton's trumpet engulfing a crown-of-thorns starfish. Reef fish are also agents of erosion-–the bumphead parrotfish chews through coral and excretes it as sand. The final scene shows huge swarms of jellyfish in the marine lakes of Palau, the jewel of Micronesia. This episode is titled "Rising Lands" on Region 1 DVD.

=== 5. "Strange Islands" ===
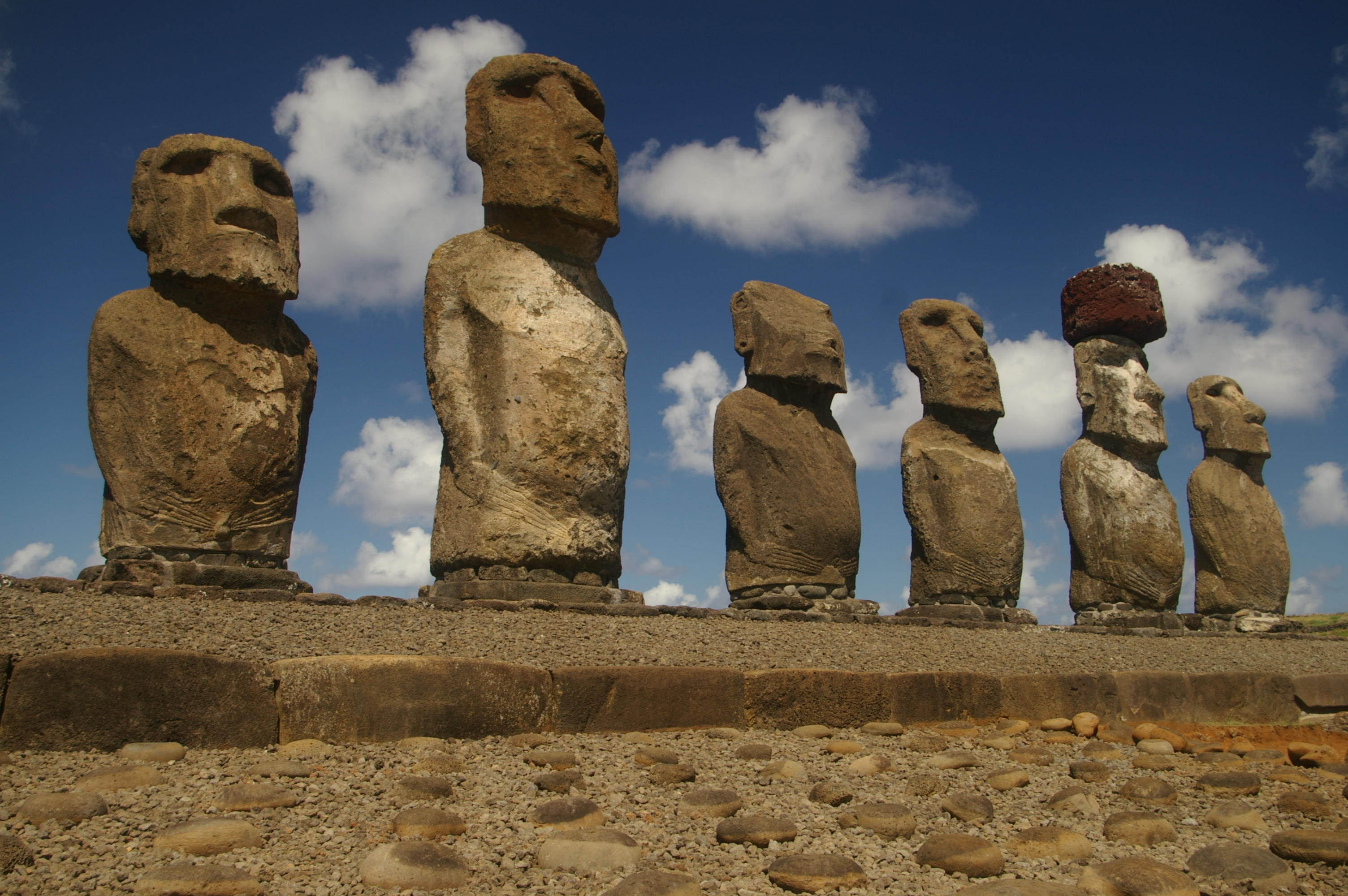
The giant stone Moai of Easter Island are a solemn reminder of a fallen civilization

UK broadcast 7 June 2009, 2.15 million viewers (8.7% audience share)

The fifth episode looks at the unusual animal life of the South Pacific. Species have evolved new behaviour to take advantage of ecological niches. On New Guinea, kangaroos such as the dingiso have become arboreal, taking the place of monkeys. The lack of predators on the ground has resulted in more flightless birds than anywhere else on Earth, including the kagu from New Caledonia. The Solomon Islands are home to the monkey-tailed skink, the largest of its kind. Unlike any of its relatives, it has a prehensile tail, forms social bonds and has turned vegetarian. The differing bill shapes of Hawaii's honeycreepers are used to illustrate how one colonising species can evolve into many specialists. In New Zealand, Fiordland crested penguins raise their chicks in the forests and short-tailed bats behave more like mice, hunting wetas on the ground. The fate of some New Zealand animals illustrates the fragility of island life. The kākāpō, once a successful and abundant herbivore, was defenseless against Māori hunters and introduced predators. There are now 70 million Australian possums in New Zealand's forests, where they out-compete native wildlife. Controlling introduced species is a huge problem across the South Pacific. Wild tuataras can still be found on Stephens Island, but the flightless wren was not so lucky – the last of its kind were killed by pet cats before it was declared a new species. The collapse of the Rapanui civilization on Easter Island shows that human beings are not immune to this precarious existence.

=== 6. "Fragile Paradise" ===
UK broadcast 14 June 2009, 1.99 million viewers (9.4% audience share)

The final episode focuses on the environmental problems facing the South Pacific. Climate change threatens many islands, because they are low-lying and could be engulfed by rising seas. On Tuvalu, seawater bubbles up through the ground at high tides, making evacuation a realistic possibility. Oceans absorb half of all atmospheric CO_{2}, but this turns them acidic, preventing sea creatures from building calciferous shells. The most immediate threat is overfishing. Reef damage by boats and tourism affects fish populations, but coral gardeners in Fiji have a solution. They harvest and grow corals artificially, then transplant them back to damaged reefs. Different fishing methods are compared, from sustainable pole and line fishing practised by Solomon Islanders to long-line fishing, which has endangered albatross populations across the region. Commercial fishing vessels lay huge purse seine nets, large enough to catch 150 tonnes at a time. Cameras follow the action inside the net as a haul of yellowfin and skipjack tuna are brought to the surface. Greenpeace's flagship Esperanza patrols the high seas, unprotected pockets of ocean where fishing is unregulated. Less than 1% of the Pacific is protected, and yet up to 90% of its large predatory fish may have been lost already. A Fijian community reef is proof that protection could yet work. Tourism benefits from divers prepared to pay for close encounters with bull and tiger sharks, and fishermen benefit from increased stocks. An international conservation effort also helped save humpback whales, as numbers have recovered since the whaling ban.

== Title music ==
The music in the title sequence is a ukulele medley of "Over the Rainbow" performed by Israel Kamakawiwo'ole. The original song was sung by Judy Garland in the movie The Wizard of Oz.

== Reception ==
Writing in The Guardian, Sam Wollaston said that it was "about beautiful South Pacific things, filmed amazingly," but criticised the "slightly irritating script" and called the show "perhaps a little unfocused."

At the 2010 News & Documentary Emmy Awards, Wild Pacific won an Emmy in the category "Outstanding Individual Achievement in a Craft: Cinematography - Nature" (awarded to Rod Clarke, Wade Fairley and Richard Wollocombe for "Survivors.") The series was also nominated for a Royal Television Society Craft & Design Award for "Best Sound: Entertainment & Non-Drama" (Kate Hopkins, Tim Owens, Andrew Wilson).

The show came back to public attention on 24 October 2014, when a clip on The Graham Norton Show highlighted Cumberbatch's inability to pronounce the word "penguin", rendering it at various points in the finished program's narration either as "pengwing" or "pengling".

== Merchandise ==
DVD and Blu-ray Disc were released to accompany the TV series:

- A Region 2, 2-disc DVD set (BBCDVD2940) and a Blu-ray Disc set (BBCBD0047) featuring all six full-length episodes was released on 15 June 2009.
- A Region 1, 2-disc DVD set (B002BEXDXY) and a Blu-ray Disc set (B002BEXDXO) featuring all six full-length episodes was released on 14 July 2009. This version is known as Wild Pacific.
