= Madagascar (TV series) =

- Series title card from UK broadcast
- Genre: Nature documentary
- Narrated by: David Attenborough
- Composer: Sarah Class
- Country of origin: United Kingdom
- Original language: English
- No. of episodes: 3

Production
- Executive producer: Mike Gunton
- Producer: Mary Summerill
- Running time: 59–60 minutes
- Production companies: BBC Natural History Unit; Animal Planet

Original release
- Network: BBC Two, BBC HD
- Release: 9 February – 23 February 2011

Related
- South Pacific; Wild Arabia

Madagascar is a British nature documentary series, first broadcast on BBC Two and BBC HD in February 2011. Produced by the BBC Natural History Unit and Animal Planet and narrated by David Attenborough, the three-part series focuses on the landscape and wildlife of the island of Madagascar in the Indian Ocean. Attenborough also appears briefly on camera at the beginning and end of the series. Each episode is followed by a ten-minute Madagascar Diaries segment, illustrating the techniques used to film a particular subject.

An accompanying documentary, Attenborough and the Giant Egg, was broadcast on BBC Two in March 2011. In this one-off programme, David Attenborough undertakes a personal journey back to Madagascar to investigate the fate of Aepyornis, the island's extinct elephant birds. Believed to be the largest birds which have ever lived, evidence of their existence can still be found on the island. Whilst filming Zoo Quest to Madagascar in 1961, Attenborough pieced together a complete elephant bird egg from fragments of shell collected for him.

== Background ==
Madagascar was first announced in March 2009 as a partnership between Animal Planet and BBC Worldwide. Production duties were handled by the BBC Natural History Unit in Bristol, with Mary Summerill acting as Series Producer and Mike Gunton as Executive Producer. The production team spent 18 months in the field, travelling to some of the island's most remote corners to find and film rare species.

- One creature that was a top priority for the crew was the indri, the largest of lemurs. They were lucky enough to spend one month tracking a family group in the Minsinjo rainforest reserve. The group comprised a breeding pair with two offspring.
- In the karst landscape of the far north, known locally as tsingy, the camera team struggled to match the agility of the crowned lemurs they were trying to film. While the lemurs bounded across razor-sharp limestone shards with ease, the team laboured to set up a camera mounted on a large jib on top of the pinnacles. Only then were they able to capture the swooping wide-angle landscape shots they needed.
- One of the most remote locations was a windswept beach at Cap Sainte Marie, the island's southernmost point. Here, the producers had been told that remains of elephant bird eggs could still be found. They were amazed to discover thousands of fragments, many of which would have lain in the same place for 1,000 years or more.

Madagascar forms part of a long-running strand of blue-chip BBC nature documentaries featuring some of the planet's greatest wildlife locations. It was preceded by South Pacific in 2009 and was followed by Wild Arabia in 2013.

== Episodes ==
This is the story of what happens when a set of animals and plants are cast away on an island for millions of years. This is how this curious wonderland came into being.

— David Attenborough's opening piece to camera

No.	Title	Original release date
1	"Island of Marvels"	9 February 2011
Animals highlighted in this episode include the indri (Indri indri), an unspecified tenrec (order Tenrecidae), the giraffe weevil (Trachelophorus giraffa), the panther chameleon (Furcifer pardalis), a pygmy chameleon (genus Rhampholeon or Brookesia), Lac Alaotra bamboo lemur (Hapalemur alaotrensis), crowned lemur (Eulemur coronatus), fossa (Cryptoprocta ferox), Verreaux's sifaka (Propithecus verreauxi), Ward's flycatcher (Pseudobias wardi), crested drongo (Dicrurus forficatus), greater flamingo (Phoenicopterus roseus), Verreaux's coua (Coua verreauxi), ring-tailed lemur (Lemur catta), Grandidier's mongoose (Galidictis grandidieri) and the radiated tortoise (Astrochelys radiata).
2	"Lost Worlds"	16 February 2011
Animals highlighted in this episode include the ring-tailed lemur (Lemur catta), the Madagascar buzzard (Buteo brachypterus), the pied crow (Corvus albus), the jewel chameleon (Furcifer lateralis), the helmet vanga (Euryceros prevostii), the silky sifaka (Propithecus candidus), an unspecified bamboo lemur (genus Hapalemur), the brown leaf chameleon (Brookesia superciliaris), the indri (Indri indri), an unspecified 'striped' tenrec (order Tenrecidae), an unspecified tree frog (order Anura), an unspecified wasp (suborder Apocrita), an unspecified day gecko (genus Phelsuma), an unspecified snake (suborder Serpentes), the Malagasy paradise flycatcher (Terpsiphone mutata), the Madagascar lesser cuckoo (Cuculus rochii), the aye-aye (Daubentonia madagascariensis), the climbing mantella (Mantella laevigata, called 'golden bamboo frog'), an unspecified leaf-tailed gecko (genus Uroplatus), the red ruffed lemur (Varecia rubra), the Madagascar green pigeon (Treron australis), an unspecified vasa parrot (genus Coracopsis) and the white-headed lemur (Eulemur albifrons).
3	"Land of Heat and Dust"	23 February 2011
The episode focuses at life around the baobab tree (Adansonia). Animals highlighted in this episode include an unspecified dragonfly (order Epiprocta), Verreaux's sifaka (Propithecus verreauxi), ring-tailed lemur (Lemur catta), an unspecified brown lemur (genus Eulemur), an unspecified planthopper (superfamily Fulgoroidea), an unspecified mouse lemur (genus Microcebus), Labord's chameleon (Furcifer labordi), an unspecified colour-changing frog (order Anura), an unspecified vasa parrot (genus Coracopsis), an unspecified cicada (superfamily Cicadoidea) and an unspecified wasp (suborder Apocrita).

Madagascar is an unrepeatable experiment, a set of animals and plants evolving in isolation for over 60 million years. We're still trying to unravel its mysteries. How tragic it would be if we lost it before we even understood it.

— David Attenborough's closing piece to camera
