= Yellowstone (British TV series) =

- Series title card from UK broadcast
- Also known as: Yellowstone: Battle for Life
- Genre: Nature documentary
- Narrated by: Peter Firth
- Composer: Edmund Butt
- Country of origin: United Kingdom
- Original language: English
- No. of episodes: 3

Production
- Executive producer: Mike Gunton
- Producers: Andrew Murray; Nathan Budd; Paul D. Stewart
- Running time: 50 minutes
- Production companies: BBC Natural History Unit; Animal Planet

Original release
- Network: BBC Two
- Release: 15 March – 29 March 2009

Yellowstone is a BBC nature documentary series broadcast from 15 March 2009. Narrated by Peter Firth, the series takes a look at a year in the life of Yellowstone National Park, examining how its wildlife adapts to living in one of the harshest wildernesses on Earth. Yellowstone debuted on BBC Two at 8:00pm on Sunday 15 March 2009 and has three episodes. Each 50-minute episode was followed by a ten-minute film called Yellowstone People, featuring visitors to the Park and locals who had assisted the production team. The series was the channel's highest-rated natural history documentary in over five years with audiences peaking at over four million.

In the United States, an edited version of the series was broadcast under the title Yellowstone: Battle for Life. It aired as a two-hour TV special, and premiered on Animal Planet on 22 March 2009.

The series was one of the most popular titles at BBC Worldwide's annual market for international clients with pre-sales to nine territories including Spain (Canal+), Germany (WDR), Russia (Channel 1) and Italy (RTI).

== Production ==
Yellowstone was commissioned by Roly Keating, then Controller of BBC Two, as a follow-up to the award-winning series Galápagos which aired in autumn 2006. Filming began in January 2007 and continued through the following four seasons. Filming techniques previously used for both Galapagos and Planet Earth were again put to good use, including shooting with high definition cameras and high-speed shooting to slow down fast action sequences. Stabilised camera mounts also enabled the team to capture natural animal behaviour from the air, as well as dramatic, wide angle landscape shots. Aerial cinematography was provided by Aerial Camera Systems.

Yellowstone was produced by the BBC Natural History Unit and Animal Planet. The executive producer was Mike Gunton and the series producer Andrew Murray. The British version was narrated by Peter Firth.

== Episodes ==
No.	Title	Original release date	UK viewers (millions)
1	"Winter"	15 March 2009	4.04 million viewers (14.1% audience share)
A Yellowstone wolf pack in winter With temperatures plunging to –40 °C and several metres of snowfall, Yellowstone freezes solid for six months each year. In the extreme cold, moisture in the air freezes, creating diamond dust. The severe winter is the greatest challenge facing the Park's animals, but for the wolf, it is the season of opportunity. The film follows the Druid pack, one of the largest in Yellowstone, as they stalk ever-weakening prey. As herds of elk move to sheltered valleys at the edge of the Park, the wolves lie in wait. Other scavengers such as coyotes and bald eagles also take advantage of wolf kills. On the open plateau, bison are built to endure the worst of the winter, bulldozing their way through deep snow to reach grass. In the harshest winter for a decade, even they are forced to move, following a thermal river to a geyser field. The grass here is laced with silica and arsenic – if the bison stay too long, it will poison them. Aerial shots reveal the tracks of otters and coyotes moving through the snow. The coyote steals a trout stashed beneath the ice of Yellowstone Lake by the otters. The red fox is another year-round resident, listening for and pouncing on mice moving under six feet of snow. By the end of March, winter has loosened its grip, and the emergence of grizzly bears from hibernation in their mountain dens signals the approach of spring. Yellowstone People, produced by Nathan Budd, follows another winter resident, roof shoveler Jeff Henry.
2	"Summer"	22 March 2009	3.94 million viewers (13.8% audience share)
Bison graze near one of the Park's hot springs As the Sun gains strength, one direction the Park begins to thaw and grazers move back up to higher altitudes. The hardy bison are amongst the first, their newborn calves struggling to cross rivers swollen by meltwater during the journey. Bison, along with elk, pronghorn and migrant birds, are drawn to the fertile pastures of the plateau. Newborn pronghorn twins must use the long grass for camouflage against prowling coyotes. There is a rare sight of wolf pups as the Druid pack venture from the woods to visit the riverside. By June, the blooming wildflower meadows attract calliope and rufous hummingbirds, but when a summer blizzard blows in, the birds must turn to sugar-rich tree sap to survive. As summer returns, a new challenge emerges: Yellowstone begins to dry out. Yellowstone cutthroat trout mass in shallow streams ready to spawn, but they make easy prey for otters and osprey. In August, the hot, dry plateau is the scene of the annual bison rut. Lightning can spark fierce wildfires, but the short-term devastation is part of the ecological cycle and helps the lodgepole pine forests regenerate. Meanwhile, grizzly bears converge on the high mountain slopes as they seek out an unusual food source: army cutworm moths, which arrive in their millions from the prairies. A female bear is injured in a clash with a male, but they must take advantage of the bounty before the brief summer is over. In Yellowstone People, produced by Kathy Kasic, we meet the 'geyser gazers', tourists drawn to Yellowstone's famous geysers.
3	"Autumn"	29 March 2009	3.83 million viewers (14.3% audience share)
Bull elk calling during the rutting season Autumn is Yellowstone's shortest season and a period of swift change. Conditions change from summer to winter in just two months, forcing animals to leave or prepare for winter. Bison rely on stored fat to see them through, but elk and pronghorn head for lower ground. Their only natural enemy is the wolf, but beyond the Park boundaries they must contend with different hazards: hunting, heavy industry and traffic. Since their reintroduction to Yellowstone in the 1990s, wolves have expanded their range, bringing them into contact with people. Telemetry enables ranchers to track wolves fitted with radio collars and scare them off. The wolf's return has restored the natural balance of Yellowstone: elk no longer graze along the river banks, leaving more willow saplings for beavers. In autumn, beavers are busy repairing their dams and harvesting saplings for their underwater larder. In the Beartooth Mountains, pine squirrels, grizzlies and Clark's nutcrackers take advantage of a bumper crop of cones from the whitebark pines. The trees are under attack from beetle larvae, which now survive through the winter due to the warming climate. By late September, bull elk are exhausted from six weeks of rutting and herding. As the females come into season, only those bulls who still have the strength to see off challengers will have the chance to mate. In Yellowstone's mountains, male bighorn sheep clash horns as the first snows of winter arrive. Yellowstone People, produced by Kathy Kasic, profiles sound recordist Mike Kasic, who swims in the Park's rivers.

== Reception ==
The Daily Telegraph's David Horspool described the series as "amazingly shot" and a "work of art". Andrew Billen in The Times gave it five out of five, and TV Scoop described it as "majestic yet understated and consistently surprising".

=== Awards ===
At the 2009 Jackson Hole Wildlife Film Festival, Yellowstone gained the Best Series Award, and "Winter" gained the Best Wildlife Habitat Program award. It was also a finalist in the Best Cinematography category. At the 2009 International Wildlife Film Festival Awards, the series won the Best Cinematography and Best Ecosystem awards, and gained Merit Awards for Editing and Sound Design. Edmund Butt also won the Music – Original Title award at the 2009 Royal Television Society Craft and Design Awards. The series was nominated for the 2010 BAFTA Television Award for Best Specialist Factual. and won a craft BAFTA for Photography Factual in the same year.
