= Wild Caribbean =

- Series title card from UK broadcast
- Genre: Nature documentary
- Narrated by: Steve Toussaint
- Composer: David Lowe
- Country of origin: United Kingdom
- Original language: English
- No. of episodes: 4

Production
- Executive producer: Fiona Pitcher
- Producers: Scott Alexander; Karen Bass
- Running time: 50 minutes
- Production company: BBC Natural History Unit

Original release
- Network: BBC Two
- Release: 16 January – 6 February 2007

Related
- Europe: A Natural History; Wild China

Wild Caribbean is a four-part BBC nature documentary series exploring the natural and cultural history of the Caribbean Islands and Sea. It was first transmitted in the UK on BBC Two in January 2007. The series was produced by the BBC Natural History Unit and narrated by actor Steve Toussaint. This series also aired in Australia on ABC1 each Sunday at 7:30pm from 15 February 2009.

The series forms part of the Natural History Unit's "Continents" strand. It was preceded by Europe: A Natural History in 2005 and followed by Wild China in 2008.

== Episodes ==
=== 1. "Treasure Islands" ===
UK broadcast 16 January 2007

The first episode gives an overview of the variety of the Caribbean's natural history, revealing the hidden wild side of the islands. Spotted and bottlenose dolphins cruise the shallow sand banks around the Bahamas. The mangrove forests of Barbuda's shallow lagoons provide ideal nest sites for the Caribbean's largest colony of frigatebirds. The birds are filmed jostling over the best locations and collecting floating sticks on the wing. The nearby islands of St Lucia, St Vincent and Dominica have a different character. The thickly forested slopes of their volcanic mountains harbour rare hummingbirds and parrots. Their fertile soils also attract people, but scenes of the Montserrat eruptions of recent years show the threat they live with. The deep waters off Dominica are breeding grounds for sperm whales, filmed engaging in tactile social behaviour at the surface. Caves are a feature of Cuba's limestone geology, and provide homes for millions of bats as well as Cuban boas and secretive hutias, the latter filmed for the first time in the wild. The southerly ABC islands (Aruba, Bonaire and Curaçao), swept by dry trade winds, are virtual deserts. Every year, 20,000 Caribbean flamingos arrive to breed on their salt pans. The clear waters around Bonaire have the greatest variety of reef fish anywhere in the Caribbean. The final island to be featured is Trinidad, cut off from South America by rising sea levels 2,000 years ago. Its island fauna include many mainland species such as red howler monkeys, capuchins and scarlet ibis.

=== 2. "Reefs and Wrecks" ===
UK broadcast 23 January 2007

Coral reefs, which thrive in the warm, shallow waters around Caribbean Islands, are the subject of the second programme. Hard corals are the reef-builders, and grow their tough external skeletons by extracting nutrients from algae growing within them. Time-lapse footage shows coral polyps emerging at night to trap drifting plankton. Marine life featured includes Caribbean reef squid, octopus and blue tangs. At Silver Bank, a coral outcrop north of the Dominican Republic, up to 3,000 humpback whales pass through annually. The shallow reefs are an ever-present threat to ships, but each sunken wreck provides a perfect habitat for a new reef to grow. Nurse sharks take advantage of the shelter, and sergeant majors lay their eggs directly on the wreck. Around the mountainous islands, reefs plunge into the deep ocean at drop-offs. A wreck 200m down harbours deep sea life forms including sea lilies and rusticles, formed as bacteria and fungi eat the steel hull itself. Stretching for 180 miles off the coast of Central America, the Caribbean barrier reef is the second largest coral structure on Earth, and home to an abundance of life. By day, large creatures such as loggerhead turtles and the rare Antillean manatees browse peacefully, but at night, tarpon and other predators emerge to hunt. The final scenes show the annual gathering of snappers, triggered by a full moon. As they rise to the surface and release clouds of milt and eggs, whale sharks move in to take advantage of the sudden feast.

=== 3. "Hurricane Hell" ===
UK broadcast 30 January 2007

Around six hurricane-strength storms strike the Caribbean between June and November each year. This episode examines their impact on people and wildlife. Hurricane winds generate destructive waves which can cause catastrophic damage to offshore reefs. Some corals are tough enough to withstand the buffeting, but other are ripped up. However, providing they come to rest in a suitable location, even broken fragments can regenerate. Storm surges cause widespread damage to coastal developments and beaches, and sea turtles are particularly vulnerable. Four-fifths of the green turtle hatchlings on Grand Cayman were lost when Hurricane Ivan struck in 2004. Low-lying islands can be completely inundated by storm surges. The brown anoles of the Bahamas may well drown, but their eggs can survive submersion for six hours. Coastal mangroves provide an important natural buffer against hurricanes. Further inland, the plants and animals of the tropical forests have evolved strategies to survive hurricanes. Tabonuco trees fuse their roots together to form a solid anchor, and hummingbirds move to unaffected parts of the forest. A single extreme event can be devastating for species with a restricted range. In 1989, Hurricane Hugo decimated the Puerto Rican parrot population, leaving only three breeding pairs. By contrast, green iguanas have used floating debris to colonise new islands, showing that resilience and adaptability are the key to survival. With climate change scientists predicting more frequent and intense hurricanes in future, the ability of the Caribbean wildlife to survive and recover from them will be severely tested.

=== 4. "Secret Shores" ===
UK broadcast 6 February 2007

The final instalment takes the form of a journey along the Caribbean shore of Central America, which runs for 1700 miles from Panama to Mexico. The Panama Canal is 25m above sea level and relies on outflow from rivers in the surrounding rainforest to maintain the water level. Wildlife along the banks includes capybara, coatis and spider monkeys. The Bocas del Toro islands now lie a few miles off the coast of Panama, but were once part of the mainland. The mantled howler monkey is a mainland species stranded by the rising sea level. Others such as poison dart frogs are evolving into new forms, or adapting their behaviour; three-toed sloths have evolved to eat mangrove leaves and even swim between trees. Further north, coastal mangrove swamps are rich hunting grounds for two different creatures: white-faced capuchins are shown cracking open clam shells and Utila spiny-tailed iguanas catch fiddler crabs. Plankton blooms in the deep waters around the Bay Islands triggers a food chain. Whale sharks suck in mouthfuls of bait fish, and bonitos join the feast. Mexico's limestone Yucatan Peninsula is riddled with flooded caves, home to strange creatures including remipedes and isopods. Offshore, Turneffe Atoll is one of many coral atolls. Rare American crocodiles hatch in its sheltered mangroves, and magnificent frigatebirds mob red-footed boobies as they return to feed their chicks, forcing them to regurgitate their catch in mid air. The programme also features the indigenous Guna people of the San Blas Islands, and the Miskitos of Honduras.

== Merchandise ==
A DVD, soundtrack CD and book were released to accompany the TV series:

- A Region 2, 2-disc DVD set (BBCDVD1998) featuring all four full-length episodes was released on 5 February 2007. The DVD includes a bonus 30 minute documentary, Wildlife on One: Iguanas. A Region 4 version was also released by ABC DVD/Village Roadshow on 1 March 2009.
- The original score by David Lowe was released on 29 January 2007 as a soundtrack CD, Wild Caribbean, on the EMI label.
- The accompanying paperback book, Wild Caribbean: The Hidden Wonders of the World's Most Famous Islands by Michael Bright, was published by BBC Books on 4 January 2007 (ISBN 0-563-49383-6).
