= Mike Gunton =

British television producer

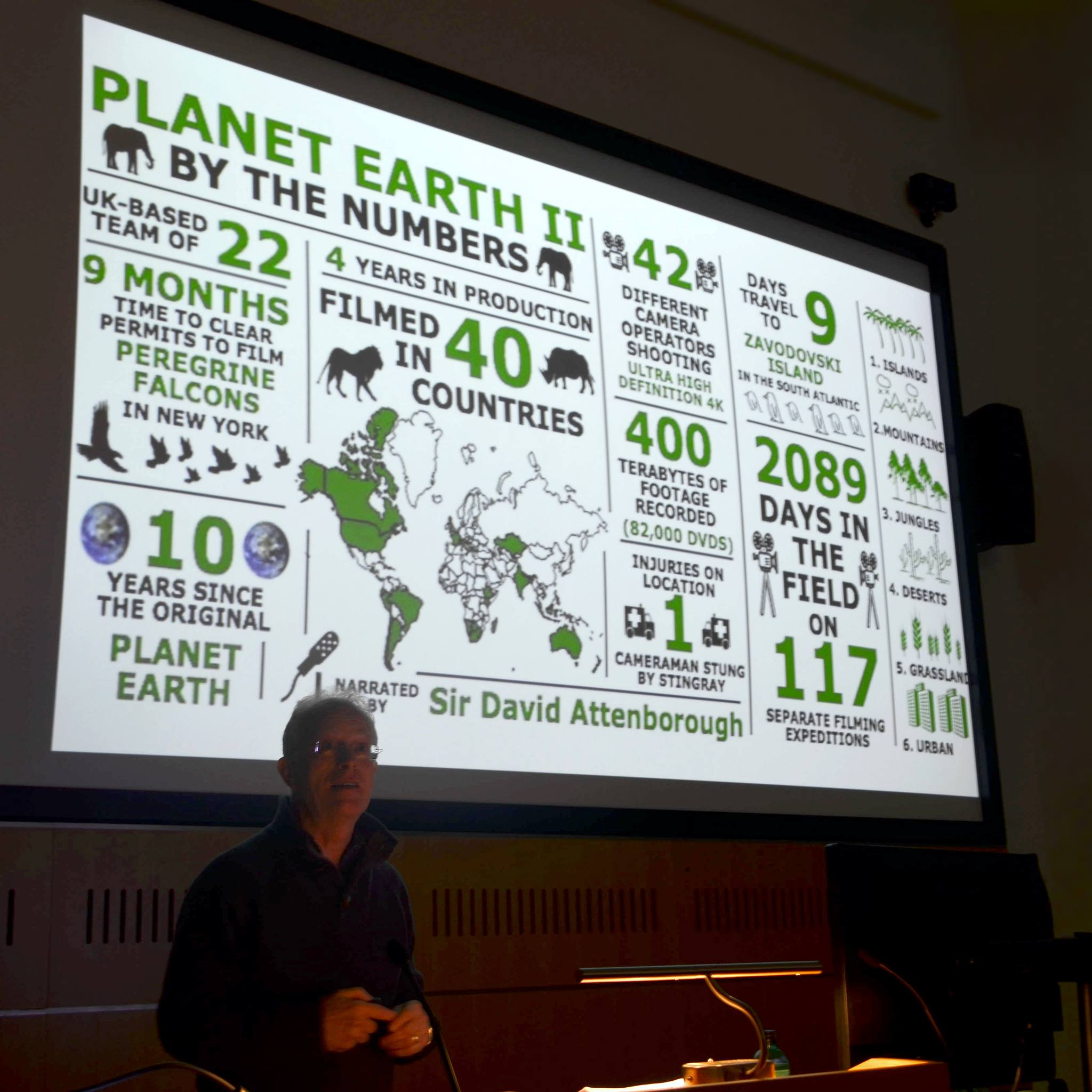
Mike Gunton presenting a talk about Planet Earth II at the Cambridge University Zoology Department in September 2017

Michael de La Roche Gunton OBE is a British television producer and a senior executive at the BBC Natural History Unit, the world's largest production unit dedicated to wildlife film-making. In November 2009 he became the Unit's first Creative Director.

As Creative Director of BBC Studios Natural History Unit, he is responsible for bringing new and pioneering stories about the natural world to global audiences, including the BAFTA and Emmy winning Planet Earth II, which was viewed by millions worldwide. In 2018, his ground-breaking animal behaviours series, Dynasties, won a number of awards and was acclaimed by Sir David Attenborough as inventing a new genre in natural history film making. A fellow of the Royal Television Society, he also speaks internationally and is an ambassador for natural history making, BBC Studios and the natural world.

He was the executive producer of Life, a nature documentary series which revealed the adaptive survival strategies of animals around the world, and as the co-author (with Martha Holmes) of the accompanying book. He co-directed (with Holmes) a feature film version of Life, and was the executive producer of a major BBC One series on African wildlife, broadcast in 2013.

== Film and TV credits ==
- Prehistoric Planet (2022-2023) - executive producer
- The Green Planet (2022) - executive producer
- Dynasties (2018) - executive producer
- Planet Earth II (2016) - executive producer
- Life Story (2014) - executive producer
- Hidden Kingdoms (2014) - executive producer
- Africa (2013) - executive producer
- One Life (2011) - co-director
- Madagascar (2011) - executive producer
- The Great Rift: Africa's Wild Heart (2010) - executive producer
- Life (2009) - executive producer
- Yellowstone (2009) – executive producer
- Galápagos (2006) – executive producer
- Life in the Undergrowth (2005) – executive producer
- Europe: A Natural History (2005) – executive producer
- Journey of Life (2005) – executive producer
- Nile (2004) – executive producer
- British Isles: A Natural History (2004) – executive producer
- Natural World (2001-2004) – series editor
- Steve Leonard's Extreme Animals (2002) - executive producer
- Steve Leonard's Ultimate Killers (1999-2001) - executive producer
- Animal People (1997-1999) – series producer
- Violent Planet (1999) - series producer
- Tales from the Riverbank (1997) - series producer
- Natural Neighbours (1994) - series producer
- The Trials of Life (1990) – producer

Episode "Finding Food"
Episode "Home Making"
Episode "Once More into the Termite Mound: The Making of The Trials of Life"
