= Nature's Great Events =

BBC wildlife documentary television series

- Series title card from UK broadcast
- Also known as: Nature's Most Amazing Events グレート・ネイチャー (Japan)
- Genre: Nature documentary
- Narrated by: David Attenborough (original version); Hasani Isa (Discovery Channel version)
- Composers: Ben Salisbury; Barnaby Taylor
- Country of origin: United Kingdom
- Original language: English
- No. of episodes: 6

Production
- Executive producer: Brian Leith
- Running time: 50 minutes (original version), 10 minutes (Diaries)
- Production companies: BBC Natural History Unit; Discovery Channel; Wanda Films

Original release
- Network: BBC One; BBC HD
- Release: 11 February – 18 March 2009

Nature's Great Events is a wildlife documentary series made for BBC television, first shown in the UK on BBC One and BBC HD in February 2009. The series looks at how seasonal changes powered by the sun cause shifting weather patterns and ocean currents, which in turn create the conditions for some of the planet's most spectacular wildlife events. Each episode focuses on the challenges and opportunities these changes present to a few key species.

Nature's Great Events was produced by the BBC Natural History Unit with the Discovery Channel and in association with Wanda Films. The British version of the series was narrated by David Attenborough. In United States, the series was shown under the alternative title Nature's Most Amazing Events beginning on 29 May 2009 and was narrated by Hasani Issa. In Australia, this program aired on ABC1 each Sunday at 7:30pm from 14 June until 19 July 2009.

The title Nature's Great Events was previously used by Reader's Digest for an unrelated VHS series released in 1996.

== Production ==
=== Production team ===
The series was first unveiled as a co-production deal with independent Wanda Films, under the working title of Earth's Great Events. The title was subsequently revised and the Discovery Channel revealed as additional co-producers. The Natural History Unit's production team includes series producer Karen Bass and executive producer Brian Leith. The score was composed by Barnaby Taylor and Ben Salisbury, orchestrated and conducted by William Goodchild and performed by the BBC Concert Orchestra. Views of the earth from space, that illustrate the climatic events around the world, were created by design company Burrell Durrant Hifle incorporating NASA photography.

=== Filming ===
Filming took place over a 25-month period, an unusually tight timescale for a natural history production of this scale. In some cases, the events were not guaranteed to occur every year, so working to such a rapid schedule meant that the film crews ran the risk of having nothing to film. Producer Karen Bass described the series as "a minor miracle, given the constraints of luck and timing - we were totally dependent on events happening when they were supposed to." One of the most challenging sequences to film was the climax of "The Great Tide" episode, featuring aerial and underwater footage of dolphins, sharks and gannets attacking a sardine shoal. In 2007, the sardine run didn't take place, and after weeks of fruitless searching, the crew had to give up. The following year, there was a second and final opportunity. Just in case they were unsuccessful again, the producers devised an alternative sixth episode which would have explored the science behind seasonal changes, looking at how the "Great Events" are triggered and how environmental change may be affecting them. As luck would have it, the sardine run returned for the first time in three years and the team captured the shots they needed.

=== Television firsts ===
The BBC claimed a number of TV firsts achieved by the production team. Many of the filming techniques first used on Planet Earth, such as the gyroscopically-stabilised helicopter camera known as the Heligimbal, were adopted again, along with new technology. In "The Great Tide", some of the surface-water footage was shot from a boat-mounted stabilised camera, previously used in the Hollywood film industry. Innovations on "The Great Flood" included FrankenCam, a motion-control macro camera developed by Ammonite Films and capable of shooting extreme close-ups of tiny subjects. The team were also the first to film narwhals from the air and the first to reveal how grizzly bears use their feet to scoop up dead salmon from deep pools. The crew of "The Great Migration" had the good fortune of witnessing the first eruption of a Tanzanian volcano in 40 years, and managed to shoot aerial footage of the event.

== Episodes ==
The power of the Sun drives the seasons, transforming our planet. Vast movements of ocean and air currents bring dramatic change throughout the year, and in a few special places, these seasonal changes create some of the greatest wildlife spectacles on Earth.

— David Attenborough's opening narration

| No. | Original title / Discovery Channel title | Original release date | UK viewers (millions) |
|---|---|---|---|
| 1 | "The Great Melt" "Arctic Summer" | 11 February 2009 | 3.68 million viewers (14.5% audience share) |
Polar bear on sea ice The opening episode shows how different species respond to the annual summer thaw of sea ice in the Arctic. The extent of the melt has been increasing in recent times, and this could be disastrous for polar bears. A mother emerges from her winter den with cubs, and leads them on to the sea ice to hunt. As the ice breaks up, the bears have difficulty walking and resort to swimming between floes. For others, it's a race to breed in the short summer season. When guillemots arrive at their nesting cliffs, the rocks are still cloaked in ice. A few short weeks later, the young launch themselves on their maiden flights, but those that crash before they reach open water present an easy meal for an Arctic fox mother and her cubs. Aerial footage shows the arrival of belugas and narwhals at the edge of the sea ice. The narwhals navigate their way along leads, but can become trapped if the ice ahead is still unbroken. In the height of summer, large parts of the Arctic Ocean are virtually ice-free, leaving some polar bears stranded on the few remaining icebergs. Those that reach dry land must wait for the winter ice to return before they can start hunting again. As the bears congregate, fights break out between the males. Nature's Great Events Diaries follows the camera team's attempts to locate narwhals in "Quest for Ice Whales".
| 2 | "The Great Salmon Run" "Grizzly Wilderness" | 18 February 2009 | 4.45 million viewers (18.7% audience share) |
The subject of the second programme is the annual salmon run on the west coast of North America. Hundreds of millions of Pacific salmon return to the mountain streams in which they were born, where they will spawn and then die. Their passage upstream is fraught with danger, from rapids, waterfalls and hungry grizzly bears. The programme begins at the arrival of spring, with a grizzly mother leading her cubs down from their winter den in the Alaskan mountains. The bears congregate in the forested valleys, where they forage for whatever food they can find. Survival is tough for all, as shown by a pack of hungry wolves attacking an adult grizzly. It is not until July that the salmon arrive in great numbers [possible CGI]. Other predators join the feast, including orcas, Steller sea lions, salmon sharks and the bald headed eagle. Those that make it past the bears risk becoming trapped in shallow reaches as the water level subsides. Relief comes as a summer storm replenishes the streams, triggered by moist ocean air rising over the coastal mountains. As they reach the spawning grounds, the salmon change body shape and colour in preparation for spawning. When it is over, the fish are close to exhaustion and they die en masse, providing an easy meal for birds and lingering bears. Their deaths are not in vain, for the nutrients from their decaying bodies help to fertilise the soil, sustaining the forests of tall pines. The diary piece, "Close Encounters of a Grizzly Kind", reveals how footage of the bears fishing using their feet was obtained.
| 3 | "The Great Migration" "Surviving the Serengeti" | 25 February 2009 | 3.73 million viewers (15.8% audience share) |
Ol Doinyo Lengai volcano The third instalment follows a year in the life of the Ndutu lion pride, which occupies a territory on the short-grass plains of the Serengeti. Their lives are dictated by the annual migration of one million wildebeest and zebra around the Serengeti. As the herds move north following the rains, the Ndutu pride's four lionesses and seven cubs are left behind to face the dry season without their main prey. The grass dies off leaving the lions without cover, making hunting what few animals remain even more difficult. The pride must keep moving to find food, but gradually the starving cubs weaken. A female cub and her brother, both in very poor condition, cannot keep up with the adults, and their fate seems sealed. However, when the pride is relocated the following month, the two cubs have somehow survived and been reunited with the adults. The lions face a further challenge as the active volcano Ol Doinyo Lengai erupts for the first time since 1967, raining ash down on the plains. These cyclical eruptions play a crucial role in the Serengeti ecosystem. The ash fertilises the earth, and with the arrival of the first storms, the plains become green and lush. The wildebeest herds return and give birth to their young, and the Ndutu pride can enjoy the good times again. In "Pride and Peril", the diary segment, cameraman Owen Newman's long and lonely vigil watching the Ndutu pride is rewarded with a story of hardship, loss and fortitude.
| 4 | "The Great Tide" "Army of Predators" | 4 March 2009 | 4.04 million viewers (17.6% audience share) |
Along South Africa's east coast, the right combination of winter weather and ocean currents trigger the sardine run, one of the most impressive events in the world's oceans. In recent years, the sardine run has become less predictable, for reasons which are still unclear, bringing into jeopardy an entire food chain which it supports. The fourth programme follows the largest gathering of predators on the planet as they hunt down billions of sardines pinned to the cold water along the coast. They include Cape gannets, which time their breeding to coincide with the arrival of the huge sardine shoals. They are filmed at their breeding colony on Bird Island and in super slow motion breaking the surface on their plunge dives. In the water, a super-pod of 5,000 common dolphins also hunts down the sardines. A 15-mile long shoal is located by the predators, and the ensuing feeding frenzy is filmed from the air, the surface and underwater. Dolphins herd the sardines into the shallows, where they come within reach of the diving gannets. Thousands of sharks arrive to join the attack, but the largest predator of all is the lunging Bryde's whale. "Life on the Run" follows the fortunes of the film crew as they track the hunters. In 2007, the sardine run didn't happen at all, but their patience was rewarded the following year.
| 5 | "The Great Flood" "Kalahari Flood" | 11 March 2009 | 3.88 million viewers (16.8% audience share) |
The fifth instalment is set in Botswana, where the arid plains of the Kalahari are transformed into a lush wetland by the annual flooding of the Okavango Delta. The Okavango River is charged by rain falling in the Angolan highlands, but it is months before the water arrives at the delta. Meanwhile, thousands of animals follow ancient migration routes across the desert, braving dehydration and punishing heat. New elephant behaviour is filmed as they skim their trunks delicately across the surface of a stagnant pool, siphoning clean water from the upper layers. The transformation of the desert into a green oasis is filmed using time-lapse photography, whilst sequences shot with macro lenses show the changes in much finer detail. For the first time, vast clouds of dragonflies are observed emerging to mate and lay their eggs. Larger animals make the most of the sudden riches the new landscape offers. Male hippos plough through the newly formed waterways and battle for dominance, red lechwe bound through the shallows and huge flocks of wading birds arrive to breed. Elephants and buffalo face one final challenge before they reach the delta; a pride of hungry lions. The lions attack in broad daylight, bringing down an elephant calf. The making-of featurette, "Mission Impassable", follows the crew as they struggle to cross ever-deepening waters to reach and film the front line of the advancing flood.
| 6 | "The Great Feast" "Pacific Feast" | 18 March 2009 | 4.02 million viewers (18.0% audience share) |
The final episode features the summer plankton bloom along the coast of British Columbia and Alaska. In winter, the coastal fjords and inlets are relatively lifeless, and the resident Steller sea lions must dive deeper and further from the coast to catch the widely-dispersed herring. Humpback whales overwinter in the warm Pacific waters off Hawaii, where new mothers suckle their calves. They begin their 3,000-mile journey north in early spring, when the sea lions also give birth to their young. Spring storms are a hazard for the sea lion colonies and some pups are inevitably lost, but these same storms disturb nutrients in the water which, together with the strengthening power of the sun, act as the catalysts for the plankton bloom. Huge shoals of herring arrive to spawn, turning the shallows milky white. The herring sift plankton from the water. In their wake come larger predators, including Pacific white-sided dolphins and killer whales. The latter are filmed attacking a male sea lion. Common murres dive under the herring shoals and pick off the fish from below, pinning them to the surface. Their defence is to form a bait ball, but gulls gathering on the surface attack them from above. The finale to the programme features unique underwater footage of humpbacks engulfing whole bait balls, and reveals their co-operative hunting behaviour called bubble-netting. The diary segment, "Swallowed by a Whale", looks at the challenges of filming the humpbacks and sea lions underwater.

== Reception ==
The series drew an average of 4.0 million viewers and a 16.9% audience share, down on BBC One's average share of 24% for the same time slot in 2008. However, the Sunday evening repeats at a more family-friendly viewing time drew similar viewing figures to the first broadcast, and the episodes regularly featured in the top ten weekly chart on BBC iPlayer.

The series received almost universal praise in the British press. Writing in The Guardian of the scene in which a humpback whale swallows a shoal of herring, Lucy Mangan commented: "You can cradle your jaw safely in your lap for the rest of the evening, as you replay that moment in your mind's eye and reel at the slower but no less staggering evocation by the entire programme, the entire series, of the incredible force and fragility of it all." The sequence was also singled out by Tim Teeman in The Times, who wrote "now that was a money shot. Nature's Great Events: "The Great Feast" was no mis-sale". He went on to describe it as "the most surprising bit of television this week" and "the most mind-blowing, horrific and beautiful sequence of film". The series also gained a very favourable review in The Scotsman. Its critic Paul Whitelaw described it as "quite simply wonderful television. Visually stunning, immersive and mesmerising, it examined some of the most dramatic wildlife spectacles on Earth with characteristic verve and insight." He singled out praise for David Attenborough, noting that "even when he is merely narrating, [he] is quite brilliant at what he does, and I defy anyone to refute that."

Matt Warman of The Daily Telegraph was complimentary about the "wealth of surprising, beautiful images", but criticised the series for its superficial treatment of environmental issues. Writing about the plight of polar bears highlighted in "The Great Melt", he commented "it was tempting to ask whether the rise of one species, man, and the decline of another could not be considered a sad part of evolution by natural selection... Nature's Great Events, however, chose not to engage with the debate."

== Merchandise ==
=== DVD and Blu-ray ===
In United Kingdom, DVD has been released on 16 March 2009 (BBCDVD2863), while Blu-ray Disc was later released on 15 June 2009 by 2 Entertain. Both DVD and Blu-ray includes ten-minute feature called "Nature's Great Events Diaries" which details the filming of a particular event after each episode.

In United States and Canada, both DVD and Blu-ray Disc was released under the title "Nature's Most Amazing Events" on 2 June 2009 by BBC Warner.

In Australia and New Zealand, DVD and Blu-ray was also released by ABC DVD/Village Roadshow on 6 August 2009.

In Japan, both DVD and Blu-ray Disc were released on 4 June 2010, and it was distributed by Sony Pictures Entertainment Japan. However, it does not included Nature's Great Events Diaries like any other regions.

=== Books ===
In United Kingdom, an accompanying hardback book has been published by Mitchell Beazley on 2 February 2009. Called Nature's Great Events: The Most Spectacular Natural Events on the Planet, it is authored by the BBC Natural History Unit, edited by Karen Bass and has an introduction by Brian Leith. (ISBN 9781845334567)

The companion volume for the US market, Nature's Great Events: The Most Amazing Natural Events on the Planet, was published by the University of Chicago Press on 15 May 2009. (ISBN 9780226471549)

== Soundtrack ==
Nature's Great Events

Soundtrack album by Ben Salisbury and Barnaby Taylor
- Released: 9 September 2009
- Genres: Soundtrack, Classical music
- Length: 1:14:25
- Label: BBC Music
- Producers: BBC Music; BBC Worldwide

The musical score and songs featured in the series were composed by Ben Salisbury and Barnaby Taylor with the performed by the BBC Concert Orchestra, and has been performed during "Nature's Great Events Live" as part of an event for the re-opening of Bristol's Colston Hall in the UK. The soundtrack was only available for digital release at iTunes Store on 9 September 2009.

Nature's Great Events (Music from the Television Series)

| No. | Title | Length |
|---|---|---|
| 1. | "Nature's Great Events (Title)" | 2:10 |
| 2. | "The Great Forest" | 2:40 |
| 3. | "A Mountain Awakening" | 3:22 |
| 4. | "Hunting Salmon" | 1:23 |
| 5. | "Pacific Rain" | 2:00 |
| 6. | "The Great Melt" | 2:24 |
| 7. | "Mother and Cub" | 1:13 |
| 8. | "Narwhal Journey" | 2:55 |
| 9. | "Icy Waterfalls" | 1:53 |
| 10. | "Journey's End" | 1:17 |
| 11. | "The Sea Turns to Ice" | 3:24 |
| 12. | "The Mountain of God" | 1:32 |
| 13. | "Wildebeest Play" | 1:23 |
| 14. | "Stealth Attack" | 2:20 |
| 15. | "The Great Migration" | 6:05 |
| 16. | "The Pride Returns" | 2:03 |
| 17. | "The Great Flood" | 3:09 |
| 18. | "Dragonflies" | 1:03 |
| 19. | "Desperation" | 3:13 |
| 20. | "Elegy" | 1:14 |
| 21. | "Scorched Earth" | 1:34 |
| 22. | "Reaching Water" | 1:56 |
| 23. | "The Great Feast" | 1:19 |
| 24. | "Storm" | 2:44 |
| 25. | "Bubble Netting" | 3:05 |
| 26. | "The Great Tide" | 2:29 |
| 27. | "Super Pod" | 2:02 |
| 28. | "Dying Gannet" | 1:08 |
| 29. | "Gannet Take Off" | 2:35 |
| 30. | "The Attack Begins" | 4:15 |
| 31. | "Massed Attack" | 2:59 |
| 32. | "The Making Of" | 1:36 |
