= Hidden Kingdoms =

- Also known as: Mini Monsters (Discovery Channel Version)
- Genre: Factual
- Narrated by: Stephen Fry; Peter Dinklage (US version)
- Composer: Ben Foster
- Country of origin: United Kingdom
- Original language: English
- No. of episodes: 3 (list of episodes)

Production
- Executive producers: Mike Gunton (Original Version); Robert Zakin (Discovery Channel Version)
- Producers: Mark Brownlow (Original Version); John Cavanagh (Discovery Channel Version); Simon Bell (episode 1); Verity White (episode 2); Gavin Maxwell (episode 3)
- Editor: Stuart Napier (episode 1)
- Running time: 60 minutes
- Production companies: BBC Natural History Unit; Discovery Channel; RTL Group; France Télévisions; CCTV-9; R.T.I S.p.A.

Original release
- Network: BBC One; BBC One HD
- Release: 16 January – 30 January 2014

Hidden Kingdoms is a British documentary television series that was first broadcast on BBC One on 16 January 2014. The three-part series is narrated by Stephen Fry and shows how animals experience the world from their perspective. Animals shown include a Rufous elephant shrew, grasshopper mouse, chipmunk, treeshrew, marmoset and Japanese rhinoceros beetle.

In the United States, the series was shown under the alternative title Mini Monsters, which aired at Discovery Channel on 31 May 2014.

== Production ==
Kim Shillinglaw, the BBC's head of commissioning for natural history and science, announced the series on 21 November 2013. The following landscapes were used for the series: savanna, desert, jungle, forest and the metropolis of Rio de Janeiro and Tokyo. The executive producer is Mike Gunton, senior executive of the BBC Natural History Unit, and produced by Mark Brownlow. Hidden Kingdoms is a BBC, Discovery, RTL Group, France Télévisions and CCTV-9 co-production, in association with R.T.I S.p.A.

BBC Worldwide announced pre-sales for Hidden Kingdoms before the 2013 MIPCOM. The series has been licensed to Network Ten (Australia), BBC Knowledge (South Africa), Sveriges Television (Sweden) and RÚV (Iceland). BBC Worldwide also signed a deal with the Korean Broadcasting System.

On-screen warnings of re-enacted elements were shown in Hidden Kingdoms. One of the scenes, featuring a mouse leaping to escape the jaws of a rattlesnake, was created by filming rattlesnakes making strikes at a hot towel placed above a camera, which was then merged with footage of the mouse.

== Episode list ==
No.	Title	Original release date	UK viewers (millions)
1	"Under Open Skies"	16 January 2014	3.41
2	"Secret Forests"	23 January 2014	3.52
3	"Urban Jungles"	30 January 2014	2.74

== Reception ==
Overnight figures showed that the first episode on 16 January 2014 was watched by 14.4% of the viewing audience for that time, with 3.41 million watching it. The second and third episodes attracted 3.52m (15.5%) and 2.74m (12.4%) respectively.

Some reviewers criticised the show's use of staged scenes and digital editing, stating that the depicted events and locations are "astonishing if true, but frustrating and worthless if merely a digital effect".

== Home media ==
In the United Kingdom, a single DVD disc was released on 27 January 2014 by BBC Worldwide.

In United States and Canada, DVD and Blu-ray Disc were released on 8 July 2014. It was distributed by BBC Warner.

In Germany, DVD and Blu-ray Disc were released on 19 December 2014.

In Japan, both DVD and Blu-ray Disc were released on 3 November 2015.

== Soundtrack ==
Hidden Kingdoms

Soundtrack album by Ben Foster
- Released: 11 March 2014
- Genres: Soundtrack, Classical music
- Length: 1:18:44
- Label: Silva Screen Records
- Producers: BBC Worldwide; BBC Earth

The musical score and songs featured in the series were composed and conducted by Ben Foster, with the performed by the BBC Concert Orchestra. The audio cd soundtrack was released on 11 March 2014, while digital soundtrack was available on 15 January 2016.

No.	Title	Length
1.	"Hidden Kingdoms Opening Titles"	1:49
2.	"Africa"	2:24
3.	"Lizard Attack"	3:18
4.	"Exploring the Trail"	1:10
5.	"The Dung Beetles"	1:50
6.	"Fire"	1:27
7.	"Life"	2:52
8.	"The Wild West"	1:02
9.	"Scorpion Mouse"	2:22
10.	"The Jaws of Death"	0:55
11.	"In the Rain"	0:55
12.	"The Flood"	0:55
13.	"Run Mouse, Run!"	1:38
14.	"Tom vs The Lizard"	1:26
15.	"Running Free"	4:13
16.	"Meeting Chip"	2:53
17.	"A Burglar"	1:12
18.	"You Naughty Moose!"	1:01
19.	"It's a Fight!!"	0:54
20.	"The Dark, Dark Wood"	0:37
21.	"Forest of the Owl"	1:24
22.	"Winter Approaching"	1:00
23.	"Do or Die"	0:55
24.	"Fight Fight Fight!"	1:34
25.	"Life in the Trees"	2:14
26.	"The Forest"	1:20
27.	"Three Little Pigs"	2:21
28.	"Forest Giants"	1:33
29.	"Pitcher Plant"	1:21
30.	"Fluorescence"	1:48
31.	"Snake Attack / The Leap"	1:31
32.	"The Season Change"	3:07
33.	"Urban Jungle"	0:44
34.	"The Streets of Rio"	2:22
35.	"Marmoset Investigates"	1:31
36.	"Ant Colony"	1:48
37.	"Cat on the Prowl"	1:50
38.	"Tokyo Nights"	0:47
39.	"Beetle Rock"	0:53
40.	"Beetle Roll"	1:50
41.	"Bright Lights"	3:00
42.	"Ghek Off the Wall"	1:33
43.	"Praying Mantis"	0:54
44.	"Flight to the Temple"	1:44
45.	"Beetle Beetle"	1:31
46.	"Living Side by Side"	1:27
47.	"Everywhere, A Hidden Kingdom"	0:40
48.	"Hidden Kingdoms Closing Titles"	1:09
Total length:		78:44
