= Wild China =

- Series title card from UK broadcast
- Also known as: Beautiful China (Chinese title)
- Genre: Nature documentary
- Narrated by: Bernard Hill (BBC); David Suzuki (CBC)
- Composer: Barnaby Taylor
- Countries of origin: United Kingdom; China
- Original language: English/Chinese
- No. of episodes: 6

Production
- Executive producer: Brian Leith
- Producers: Phil Chapman (BBC); Gao Xiaoping (CCTV)
- Production location: China
- Running time: 50 minutes
- Production companies: BBC Natural History Unit; CCTV

Original release
- Network: BBC Two
- Release: 11 May – 15 June 2008

Related
- Wild Caribbean; South Pacific

Wild China is a six-part nature documentary series on the natural history of China, co-produced by the BBC Natural History Unit and China Central Television (CCTV) and filmed in high-definition (HD). It was screened in the UK on BBC Two from 11 May to 5 June 2008. The English narration was provided by Bernard Hill and the series produced by Phil Chapman for the BBC and Gao Xiaoping for CCTV. The Chinese version was broadcast under the title Beautiful China. In Canada, it was broadcast on CBC as part of the series The Nature of Things narrated by David Suzuki. Wild China was broadcast in Australia on ABC1 and ABC HD each Sunday at 7:30pm from 18 May 2008.

The musical score to accompany the series was composed by Barnaby Taylor and was performed by Cheng Yu and the UK Chinese Ensemble.

The series was billed as the culmination of the BBC Natural History Unit's "Continents" programmes, a long-running strand of blue-chip wildlife documentaries which surveyed the natural history of each of the world's major land areas. It was preceded by Wild Caribbean in 2007, but with the broadcast of South Pacific in 2009 the BBC signalled a continuation of the strand.

== Production details ==
The 2008 Beijing Olympics gave the BBC Natural History Unit team the opportunity to make the first comprehensive series on China's natural history. In the run up to the Games, the Chinese government was "understandably keen to promote itself as a country worth visiting" according to BBC producer Phil Chapman. Permission for Wild China was granted in 2005, with the BBC working alongside local partners CTV, a Beijing production company closely allied to state broadcaster CCTV. The series marks the first time that CCTV has collaborated with a foreign broadcaster.

With wildlife filmmaking in its infancy in China, and a perception in the developed world of a country plagued by environmental problems, the producers hoped that the series would change attitudes in both the East and the West:

"We want the Chinese to feel proud of their countryside and wildlife, to care about it and to seek to ensure its survival. We also hope to redress the negative view of China's environment propagated in western media."

— Series Producer Phil Chapman, writing in BBC Wildlife magazine

Filming for the series took place over 16 months, and involved half a million miles of travel on 57 separate filming trips to some of China's most inaccessible and spectacular locations. The production team shot over 500 hours of HD footage in 26 of China's 30 provinces.

Despite being granted unprecedented access to many remote and protected areas, one of the main challenges faced by the filmmakers was finding wildlife. Although 15% of China's territory has some form of protection, this is not a guarantee of safety for wildlife, as reserves were often found to be under-equipped and under-staffed. In addition, they encountered a lack of local expertise and specialist knowledge, as few of China's zoologists were naturalists with an interest in observing wildlife. Producers even struggled to film the courting behaviour of one of the country's commonest creatures, the rice-paddy frog. Consequently, the team's attempts to find and film wildlife were not always successful.

With the support of local party officials, the producers found it easier to contact and film local people. They were particularly keen to record examples of traditional lifestyles which incorporate the natural world to give the series a cultural context. The episodes were divided by region to present the distinct cultural as well as ecological differences.

== Filming techniques ==
Over 80% of the series was based on traditional observational techniques in the wild. These were conducted in some of China's most remote areas:

- Apart from a handful of biologists, the Wild China team were the first to set foot in Tibet’s remote Chang Tang reserve for almost 100 years. After a five-day drive from Lhasa, they were faced with the challenge of filming rutting chiru in temperatures of -30°C at 5,000m above sea level. The sequence showing a duel between two rival males was successfully filmed after stalking the herds for seven days. Field producer Jeff Boedeker trained with his team for a month in various stealth techniques. On one occasion the field team lay under a white tarp for 32 hours waiting for a shot that never came. They burned yak dung to stay warm and melt drinking water, and the crew was specifically selected for its sensibility to cultures, mental and physical aptitude for high stress scenarios, and techniques in nonfiction filmmaking.
- After two unsuccessful attempts to film wild giant pandas in the Qinling Mountains, the producers switched to a different part of the region, the little-visited Changqing Reserve. There they were able to track and film the creatures in winter, and also film courtship and mating activity, the first time such a complete sequence has been shot in the wild.
- Producer Kathryn Jeffs and cameraman Paul Stewart travelled to the remote Gaoligong Mountains in western Yunnan and after a three-hour trek to a ridge overlooking the forest, managed to film a troop of bear macaques feeding on fruits in the canopy. A second sequence showing white-eared pheasants at a rarely seen lek was ruined when the birds were disturbed.

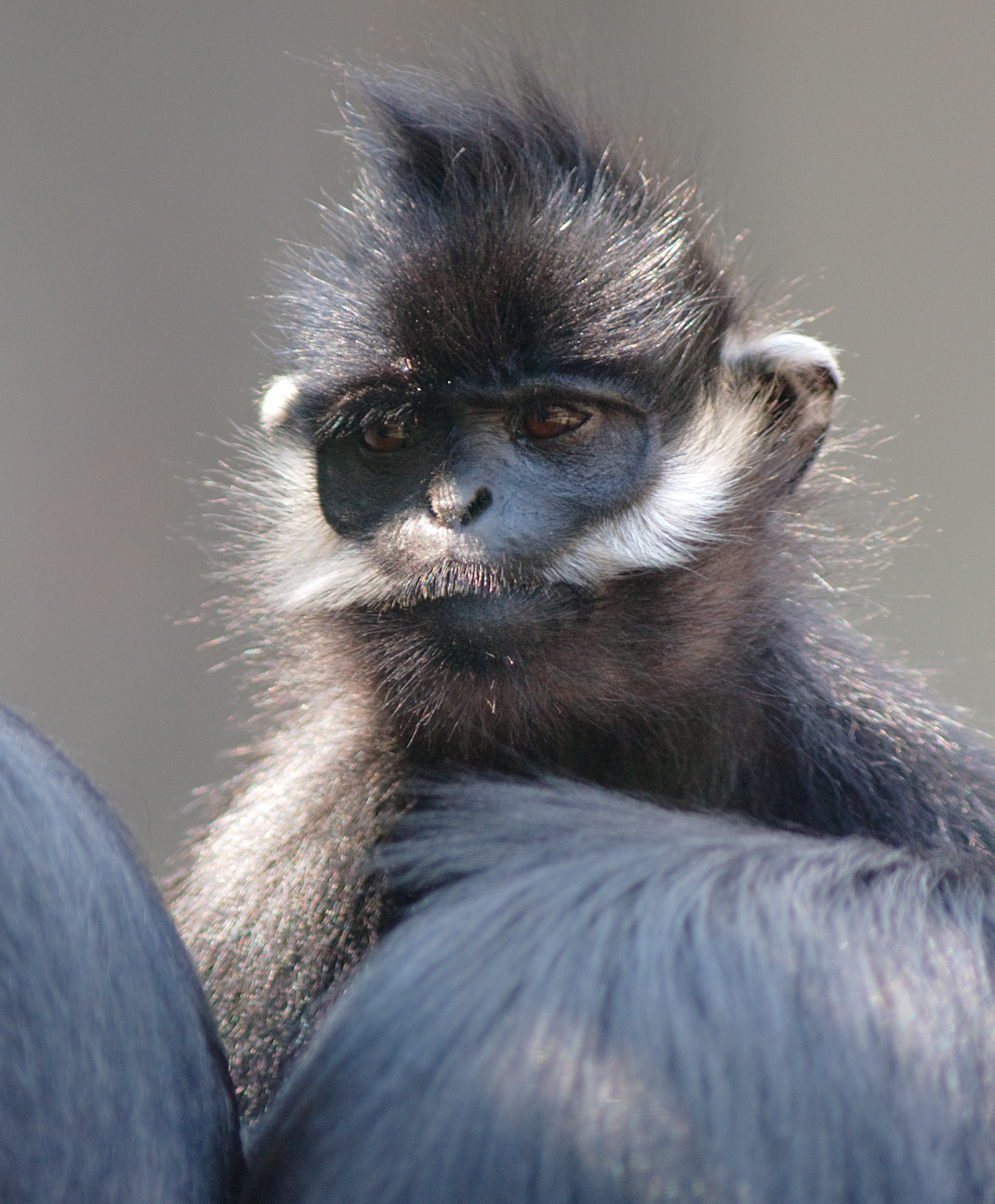
Francois' langurs were filmed taking refuge in a cave

Certain sequences could only be filmed using special techniques:

- High speed cameras were used to slow down the action 80 times to show a songbird evading the lunge of a Pallas' pit viper on Shedao Island.
- A time-lapse sequence of a remote Tibetan gorge was filmed using still images taken at intervals after the main filming camera broke down.
- Infrared lighting enabled the team to film Francois langurs and bamboo bats covertly.
- Thermal imaging cameras were used to show how the elephant yam uses convection heating at night to distribute its distinctive smell, which attracts pollinating beetles.

In some circumstances behaviour was too difficult to obtain in the wild, and controlled conditions were required:

- Bamboo rats and Roborovski hamsters were filmed in burrows with glass side panels in a studio set.
- The producers negotiated an agreement to take Chinese alligator eggs from an incubator at the Xuancheng breeding centre and place them in an artificial nest to film them hatching.
- The courtship display of Temminck's tragopans was filmed using a captive pair of birds habituated to the presence of humans. Hunting pressure has made the wild birds in Yunnan too wary to approach.
- The slowed-down images of jumping spiders on Everest could not be filmed in the wild due to the impracticality of transporting high-speed camera equipment to the remote location, so a closely related species was filmed in a studio set.

== Episodes ==
No.	Title	Original release date	UK viewers (millions)
1	"Heart of the Dragon"	11 May 2008	2.55 million viewers (11% audience share)
The Li River and the Hills of Guilin The first programme in the series concentrates on South China, where the climate and terrain is ideal for rice cultivation. The terraced paddy fields of Yuanyang County plunge 2000 metres down steep hillsides to the Red River valley, and are some of the oldest man-made structures in China. In a Miao household in Guizhou province, the arrival of red-rumped swallows signals the time for planting. Other creatures which benefit from the rice monoculture include little egrets and Chinese pond herons. Of the hundreds of caves beneath the limestone hills of this South China Karst region, few have been explored. At Zhongdong, an entire community, including a school, lives in the shelter of a cave. Francois' langurs, a rare primate, use their rock-climbing skills to enter caves at night for protection. Other cave dwellers include swifts and Rickett’s mouse eared bats, filmed for the first time catching fish in the dark. Freshwater creatures are an important resource for the people of South China. The Li River cormorant fishermen now only practice their art for tourists, but at Caohai Lake, dragonfly nymphs are a unique and valuable harvest. Some delicacies, such as freshwater turtles, are vanishingly rare. Chinese alligators only survive in Anhui province thanks to dedicated conservation efforts. A troop of Huangshan macaques is shown retreating to the safety of the treetops when a venomous Chinese moccasin is spotted. After the autumn rice harvest, migratory birds including tundra swans and Siberian cranes gather at Poyang Lake.
2	"Shangri-La"	18 May 2008	2.57M viewers (10.6% audience share)
Kawagebo (6740m), the highest mountain in Yunnan, lies in the Hengduan range This episode profiles the rich biodiversity of south-western Yunnan province. Forming the eastern boundary of the Himalaya, the Hengduan Mountains have buckled into a series of parallel ridges running north-south. The Nujiang River is one of a succession of deep gorges that carve their way through the mountains. In summer, monsoon rainclouds from the Indian Ocean are funnelled up the valleys, creating a unique climate in which species from the tropics can flourish at a more northerly latitude. Yunnan’s 18,000 plant species, of which 3,000 are found nowhere else, attracted Western botanists and explorers such as Joseph Rock. In the snowbound forests surrounding the pilgrimage site of Kawakarpo (6740 m), rare Yunnan snub-nosed monkeys are filmed feeding on lichen. In the Gaoligong Mountains, tropical and alpine plants grow side by side. Birdlife filmed here includes sunbirds feeding on epiphytes and the courtship display of a Temminck's tragopan. The fruiting trees attract bear macaques and black giant squirrels, whilst China’s 250 remaining wild Asian elephants forage below. A lesser bamboo bat colony is filmed at their roost inside a single stem; each bat is the size of a bumblebee. A giant elephant yam flower is pollinated by carrion beetles at night. Black crested gibbons are filmed in the forests of Wuliangshan. The people of Yunnan include the Dai, Hani and Jino tribes, each of whom regard the forests as sacred and harvest them sustainably, but modern times are bringing new threats such as rubber plantations and tourism.
3	"Tibet"	25 May 2008	2.88M viewers (12% audience share)
A seabird colony on a Qinghai Lake island The Tibetan Plateau is the subject of the third installment. It covers one quarter of China’s land area, but just 2.5 million people live there, the majority Tibetan Buddhists. Their religion mixes traditional Buddhism with older shamanic beliefs, and its teachings have instilled a respectful attitude to wildlife. Rare species such as black-necked cranes and Tibetan eared pheasants can benefit directly from co-existence with people. Meltwaters from Tibet’s 35,000 glaciers form large freshwater lakes including Qinghai and Manasarovar. Nesting birds here include great crested grebes and bar-headed geese. The plateau is a high altitude desert swept by freezing winds, but is also home to China’s biggest concentration of large animals. Argali sheep are seen descending hillsides to their winter grazing sites. In the Changtang, chiru are filmed congregating in the rutting season, and wild yaks are only found in the remotest areas. Predators include the elusive snow leopard and the Tibetan fox, filmed profiting from a Tibetan bear's attempts to hunt pika. A highly lucrative "caterpillar fungus" (yatsa gunbu) is harvested from the spring ground for use as a traditional remedy. Life even clings on in the most extreme environments; the slopes of Everest are home to a species of jumping spider, whilst the unique hot spring snake survives at 4,500m by warming its body in thermal springs. The Saga Dawa festival takes place at sacred Mount Kailash and draws pilgrims of many faiths. Tibet is a fragile ecosystem; its glaciers are melting, and this will have a profound effect on the future for billions of people who depend on waters flowing from the plateau.
4	"Beyond the Great Wall"	1 June 2008	3.23M viewers (13.7% audience share)
Siberian tigers inhabit the forests bordering the Amur River The fourth episode looks at the lands north of China’s Great Wall. Here, nomadic tribes from a variety of ethnic groups still roam, but their traditional ways of life are changing as people move to modern cities. In ancient Manchuria, the last Hezhe fishermen still cast their nets beneath the thick ice of the frozen Black Dragon River. The forests here support wild boar, which forage for walnuts in winter, and the last remaining wild Siberian tigers in China. Ewenki reindeer herders came from Siberia hundreds of years ago: now, only 30 remain. Further west lie the rolling Mongolian steppe grasslands, and at Bayan Bulak, the livestock of Mongolian horsemen share the pastures and wetlands with breeding demoiselle cranes and whooper swans. Continuing westwards, the land becomes increasingly hot and dry, turning first to arid grasslands roamed by rare goitered gazelles, and then to the Taklamakan Desert, the world’s largest shifting sand desert. Here stand ruined towns, a legacy of the Silk Road, and many yardangs, sand-sculpted rock formations. Underground irrigation canals at the Turpan oasis enable grapes to be cultivated, and red-tailed gerbils are quick to take advantage. Kazakh nomads spend the summer in the Tian Shan before descending to the Junggar Basin, an arid land bordering the Gobi Desert, to overwinter. Here their livestock shares the meagre pasture with the last wild horses on earth. A Kazakh demonstrates the 6000-year-old tradition of hunting with golden eagles. The closing scenes show the Harbin Ice Festival.
5	"Land of the Panda"	8 June 2008	3.19M viewers (13.3% audience share)
The film features courtship and mating of wild giant pandas The fifth installment features central China, home to the Han Chinese. They are the largest ethnic group on Earth, and their language Mandarin the most widely spoken. The programme looks at how the relationship between people and wildlife has changed over time. Ancient Chinese beliefs placed great importance in the harmonious co-existence of man and nature. At the beginning of China’s period of rapid economic growth, this ideal was largely forgotten. A number of political references contrast the more enlightened environmental policies of the current government with those under Chairman Mao Zedong, which led to widespread degradation. The Chinese alligator and crested ibis are two species saved from extinction by direct intervention. Other animals have benefited from ancient spiritual beliefs and customs which live on, promoting respect and reverence for wildlife: the yellow weasels and Mandarin ducks of Beijing are two such creatures. However, wildlife is still threatened by illegal poaching for food and traditional medicine. West of Beijing lie the fertile lands of the North China Plain and the Loess plateau, source of the Yellow River. Increased demand for water has changed the river’s flow, and soil erosion causes dust storms which reach the capital. Further west, the Qinling Mountains are a refuge for some of China’s rarest species including the takin, golden snub-nosed monkey and giant panda. Giant panda courtship and mating is shown, filmed for the first time in the wild. In the colourful lakes of Jiuzhaigou, unique fish swim amongst forests preserved underwater.
6	"Tides of Change"	15 June 2008	2.52M viewers (10% audience share)
Rare black-faced spoonbills overwinter in Hong Kong The final programme features China’s 14,500 km coastline, home to 700 million people. Despite decades of rapid urban development, it is still an important migration route for birds. Endangered red-crowned cranes depart their northern breeding grounds to overwinter at Yancheng salt marsh, the largest coastal wetland in China. Shedao Island is an important stopover on the migration route, but the resident Shedao Island pitvipers, stranded by rising sea levels, lie in ambush in the branches. A snake strikes a songbird, and another is filmed swallowing a kingfisher. All along the coast, traditional forms of cultivation allow wildlife and people to live side by side. Crops vary from seaweed and cockles in the north to prawns further south, allowing birds such as whooper swans and black-faced spoonbills to prosper. Kejia tea-growers and Hui'an women harvesting oysters are also shown. China’s rivers and seas are heavily polluted. Sewage and fertiliser washed into the Bohai Gulf cause plankton blooms, attracting jellyfish, which in China are a commercial catch. In the Yangtze estuary, the migrations of creatures such as Yangtze sturgeon and mitten crabs are being impeded by upstream dams. In the tropical South China Sea, where coral reefs are under threat, whale sharks are rare visitors. Other rare creatures filmed include Pere David's deer and Chinese white dolphins. On Hainan island, macaques are shown jumping into a hotel swimming pool, epitomising the uneasy coexistence of wildlife and people in China, and the challenge of continuing its traditional harmonious relationship with nature.

== Merchandise ==
A Blu-ray Disc, DVD and book have been released to accompany the TV series:

- The Blu-ray Disc (BBCBD0025), released on 5 August 2008, presents the series in full high-definition format. The series is also included in the BBC High Definition Natural History Collection Blu-ray box sets for Regions A and B (BBCBD0056).
- A Region 2, 2-disc DVD set (BBCDVD2146) featuring all six full-length episodes was released on 9 June 2008. The Region 4 version of the DVD and Blu-ray was released by ABC DVD/Village Roadshow on 1 July 2008.
- The accompanying paperback book, Wild China: The Hidden Wonders of the World's Most Enigmatic Land by series producer Phil Chapman, was published by BBC Books on 8 May 2008 (ISBN 1-846-07233-6).
