= Surviving Paradise: A Family Tale =

2022 Netflix original documentary film

- Promotional poster
- Directed by: Renée Godfrey
- Produced by: Renée Godfrey
- Cinematography: Brad Bestelink
- Edited by: Matt Meech
- Music by: William Goodchild
- Production companies: Freeborne Media; Wild Space Productions
- Distributed by: Netflix
- Release date: 3 March 2022
- Country: United Kingdom
- Language: English

Surviving Paradise: A Family Tale is a 2022 British nature documentary film made for Netflix. It is directed by Renée Godfrey and narrated by Regé-Jean Page. The film shows how bonds within different groups of animals are necessary for survival in Botswana's Kalahari Desert during a severe dry season. It was released on 3 March 2022.
