= Wild Arabia =

- Genre: Nature documentary
- Narrated by: Alexander Siddig
- Composer: Barnaby Taylor
- Country of origin: United Kingdom
- Original language: English
- No. of series: 1
- No. of episodes: 3

Production
- Executive producer: Brian Leith
- Producers: Dan Rees; Chadden Hunter
- Running time: 58-59 minutes
- Production company: BBC Natural History Unit

Original release
- Network: BBC Two, BBC HD
- Release: 22 February – 8 March 2013

Related
- Madagascar; Wild Brazil

Wild Arabia is a British nature documentary series, first broadcast on BBC Two and BBC HD from 22 February to 8 March 2013. Produced by the BBC Natural History Unit and narrated by Alexander Siddig, the three-part series focuses on the landscapes, wildlife and people of the Arabian Peninsula. Each episode is followed by a ten-minute Wild Arabia Diaries segment, illustrating the techniques used to film a particular subject.

The series forms part of the Natural History Unit's "Continents" strand. It was preceded by Madagascar in 2011 and followed by Wild Brazil in 2014.

The series premiered in Australia on 19 July 2015 on Nat Geo Wild.

== Episodes ==
No.	Title	Original air date
1	"Sand, Wind and Stars"	22 February 2013
Arabia has been gradually drying out since the end of the last ice age Animals: Arabian oryx, dromedary, wonder gecko, Arabian jird, horned viper, scarab beetle, Nubian ibex, sandfish, dabb lizard, scorpion, lesser Egyptian jerboa, Rüppell's fox, Arabian fat-tailed scorpion, heron, common greenshank, eastern imperial eagle, Asiatic honey bee and blue-cheeked bee-eater
2	"The Jewel of Arabia"	1 March 2013
Animals: Verreaux's eagle, pygmy owl, rock hyrax, fan-tailed raven, kestrel, humpback whale, goat, Arabian wolf, striped hyena, honey badger, Arabian leopard, Arabian red fox, green sea turtle, fusilier, blue triggerfish, devil ray, Indian oil sardine, ray, Socotra cormorant, clownfish, golden silk orb-weaver, Arabian chameleon, snail and dromedary
3	"Shifting Sands"	8 March 2013
Dugongs inhabit the shallow waters of the Persian Gulf Animals: dromedary, pennant coralfish, halfmoon angelfish, queenfish, cauliflower jellyfish, whale shark, remora, Socotra cormorant, lesser flamingo, bluespotted ribbontail ray, blue triggerfish, blenny, annulated sea snake, green sea turtle, dugong, falcon, pied wagtail, wheatear, hoopoe, bluethroat and hen harrier
