= Europe: A Natural History =

- Series title card from UK broadcast
- Also known as: Wild Europe
- Genre: Nature documentary
- Narrated by: Sean Pertwee
- Composer: Barnaby Taylor
- Country of origin: United Kingdom
- Original language: English
- No. of episodes: 4

Production
- Executive producers: Mike Gunton; Walter Köhler; Reinhard Radke
- Running time: 50 minutes
- Production companies: BBC Natural History Unit; ZDF; ORF

Original release
- Network: BBC Four
- Release: 15 February – 8 March 2005

Related
- Wild Down Under; Wild Caribbean

Europe: A Natural History is a four-part BBC nature documentary series which looks at the events which have shaped the natural history and wildlife of the European continent over the past three billion years. It debuted on UK television on BBC Four in February 2005, and was repeated on BBC Two in September the same year. The series was broadcast in some other territories as Wild Europe.

The programmes featured extensive use of CGI to bring to life extinct species and show how the European cities of today would have looked at various points in the past, when the climate was very different.

Europe: A Natural History was a co-production between the BBC Natural History Unit and the public-service broadcasters of Germany and Austria, ZDF and ORF respectively. The executive producers were Walter Köhler, Mike Gunton and Reinhard Radke. The music was composed by Barnaby Taylor and performed by the BBC Concert Orchestra, and narration for the BBC broadcasts was provided by actor Sean Pertwee.

The series forms part of the Natural History Unit's "Continents" strand. It was preceded by Wild Down Under in 2003 and followed by Wild Caribbean in 2007.

== Episodes ==
=== 1. "Genesis" ===
UK broadcast 15 February 2005

Europe's natural history is the product of a complex history stretching back half a billion years. Its most ancient mountains, the Caledonites and Urals, were formed during the collision of continental plates from which modern Europe is assembled, described as "the first act of European union". During the Carboniferous period, Europe's equatorial jungles harboured giant predatory invertebrates, and the landmarks of Paris, Frankfurt and Berlin would have stood amid unbroken primeval forests. By 270 million years ago, Europe had drifted north and become part of the supercontinent Pangaea. The forests of the interior, cut off from life-giving rains, turned to desert, their remains forming the rich coal seams deposited in Europe's rocks. The Swiss Jura and other limestone regions are formed from the remains of marine creatures deposited as shallow seas evaporated. This was a time when reptiles ruled, and Oxford would have been roamed by dinosaurs. Rising sea levels triggered by a warming climate would have submerged much of Europe around 100 million years ago: only London's tallest buildings would have risen above the waves. The demise of the dinosaurs created opportunities for birds and mammals, evidence of whose ancestors has been unearthed at Messel pit. The subsequent break up of Pangaea, the birth of the Atlantic and Mediterranean and the creation of the Alps and Pyrenees were driven by tectonic forces which continue to this day in Iceland. The cyclic draining and flooding of the Mediterranean was the last geological act in the genesis of the continent.

=== 2. "Ice Ages" ===
UK broadcast 22 February 2005

2.5 million years ago, a periodic shift in the Earth's orbit, coupled with a tilt in its axis, triggered a sudden change in climate and Europe was plunged into an ice age. The wintry iciness of today's Alps spread across northern Europe as ice sheets extended as far south as London, Amsterdam and Berlin. Conditions were ideal for cold-adapted animals, forerunners of musk oxen and reindeer. Woolly mammoth bones dredged from the bottom of the North Sea are evidence that this was once icy tundra. The warm interglacial periods attracted very different creatures: fossil hippos, rhinos, lions and hyenas have been unearthed in London. This thermal pulsing has occurred around twenty times, the last ice age ending 15,000 years ago. Europe now bears the scars of repeated glaciations. Lake Ladoga, Europe's largest freshwater body, is a product of the last thaw and has its own subspecies of seal as well as osprey, moose and beaver. Ibex are ice-age immigrants from Asia, stranded in the European mountains by the receding glaciers. Even the desert sand of Słowiński in Poland can be traced back to glacial debris washed up by the sea. As the ice retreated, the plants and animals associated with modern Europe began to advance north. Those featured include the capercaillie of the northern forests and migrant birds on Germany's wetlands. Modern humans began to settle the coasts alongside otters and seals, and slowly spread along inland waterways, but made little impression on the deciduous forests of the interior.

=== 3. "Taming the Wild" ===
UK broadcast 1 March 2005

The third programme explores the growing influence of people on the land. After the last ice age, Europe's mild climate and virgin forests attracted human and animal immigrants, including moose, bear, deer and wild boar. The agreeable climate also attracted immigrant farmers from Mesopotamia to the eastern Mediterranean, and reliable food supplies encouraged permanent settlement. By 3000 BC, civilization had spread to western megalithic sites such as Stonehenge and Carnac. Bronze Age Europeans discovered the smelting process, leading to a period of conflict and conquest over valuable metal ores. The Roman Empire was born, and a massive road-building enterprise ensued, enabling a flow of trade, livestock, ideas and culture. A sudden cooling of the climate may have precipitated its collapse. In the Middle Ages, cultures such as the Vikings were influenced by the land and the sea, while in southern Spain the Moors introduced new irrigation canals. A fresh onslaught on Europe's forests supplied timber for boat-building, housing and fuel. Rats brought the Black Death into Europe's new towns and cities, killing half the human population. It would be 250 years before the numbers recovered, but this allowed wildlife some breathing space. The medieval voyages of discovery brought new plants and animals to the continent, including the potato. The Industrial Revolution made Europe rich, but at great cost to its natural resources. The birth of tourism encouraged a new appreciation of nature, and modern Europeans have switched their attitude from consumption to custodianship. As a result, wildlife is returning.

=== 4. "A New Millennium" ===
UK broadcast 8 March 2005

Europe is home to more than 700 million people, most of them city dwellers. Much of its wildlife has suffered as a result, but efforts are underway to protect and reintroduce some species. Others have exploited new opportunities offered by man-made environments. In Rome, the first metropolis on the continent, winter tourists watch swirling clouds of starlings flocking over the city. Buildings and structures have replaced caves and cliffs as preferred perches and nest sites for some birds, including kestrels and white storks. On a nearby landfill site, griffon vultures and red foxes forage and scavenge food. Wildlife and people are coming into contact more often. Joggers in the woods around Budapest often encounter wild boars, while farmers in the Carpathian Mountains live alongside Europe's biggest populations of bear, wolf and lynx. These predators were hunted to extinction in Western Europe, but are now returning, aided by green corridors such as the European Green Belt and wildlife-friendly development. Beavers have also returned in large numbers due to protection and the clean-up of Europe's polluted rivers. A chemical spill in the 1960s killed all the fish in the Rhine, but now there is a project to reintroduce Atlantic salmon to the river. There are, however, new dangers. Invasive species such as Chinese mitten crabs, Asian long-horned beetles and Japanese knotweed threaten the native flora and fauna. Climate change could also have a dramatic effect on the continent, but Europe's natural history has experienced many such changes in the past.

== See also ==
- BBC Atlas of the Natural World, a 2006–07 compilation series for North America
