= List of Nature episodes =

Nature is a wildlife television series produced by Thirteen / WNET New York. It has been distributed to United States public television stations by the PBS television service since its debut on October 10, 1982. Some episodes may appear in syndication on many PBS member stations around the United States and Canada, and on the Discovery Channel. As of 2022, the series airs on Wednesdays on PBS.

== Series overview ==
Season	Episodes	Originally released	
Season	Episodes	First released	Last released
1	13	October 10, 1982	January 2, 1983
2	13	October 9, 1983	March 25, 1984
3	18	September 30, 1984	May 26, 1985
4	20	October 20, 1985	May 25, 1986
5	20	October 19, 1986	May 24, 1987
6	21	September 20, 1987	June 12, 1988
7	20	October 8, 1988	May 14, 1989
8	20	October 8, 1989	April 15, 1990
9	21	September 30, 1990	May 12, 1991
10	21	September 28, 1991	May 31, 1992
11	20	October 5, 1992	May 23, 1993
12	14	October 3, 1993	May 15, 1994
13	13	October 2, 1994	May 21, 1995
14	14	October 8, 1995	May 12, 1996
15	14	October 13, 1996	May 14, 1997
16	16	October 12, 1997	June 14, 1998
17	16	October 11, 1998	August 8, 1999
18	16	October 24, 1999	May 14, 2000
19	16	October 22, 2000	May 20, 2001
20	9	November 4, 2001	May 19, 2002
21	15	October 13, 2002	May 18, 2003
22	13	October 19, 2003	April 18, 2004
23	13	November 7, 2004	May 15, 2005
24	13	November 6, 2005	May 7, 2006
25	13	November 5, 2006	May 6, 2007
26	13	October 28, 2007	May 11, 2008
27	13	October 26, 2008	May 17, 2009
28	10	October 25, 2009	April 11, 2010
29	16	September 26, 2010	May 22, 2011
30	13	October 19, 2011	May 16, 2012
31	13	October 10, 2012	May 15, 2013
32	19	September 4, 2013	June 25, 2014
33	17	September 24, 2014	May 20, 2015
34	16	September 23, 2015	May 18, 2016
35	17	October 12, 2016	May 10, 2017
36	16	October 4, 2017	May 23, 2018
37	15	October 24, 2018	May 1, 2019
38	18	October 2, 2019	May 20, 2020
39	13	October 21, 2020	June 30, 2021
40	13	October 20, 2021	April 27, 2022
41	13	October 19, 2022	May 3, 2023
42	17	October 18, 2023	May 22, 2024
43	13	October 23, 2024	May 7, 2025
44	13	October 22, 2025	April 22, 2026
45	TBA	October 14, 2026	TBA

== Episodes ==
=== Season 1 (1982–83) ===
No. overall	No. in season	Title	Original release date
1	1	"Flight of the Condor: Ice, Wind and Fire"	October 10, 1982
The wildlife of the Andes presented through the framing device of a condor on the wing. This first of three parts ranges from the shores of Cape Horn to Andean glaciers and volcanoes. Rebroadcast on November 20, 1983.
2	2	"Flight of the Condor: Ocean, Desert and Thin Air"	October 17, 1982
The wildlife of the Andes region of South America, from Pacific shores to open plains and deserts. Second episode of three. Rebroadcast on November 27, 1983.
3	3	"Flight of the Condor: Down the Amazon"	October 24, 1982
The wildlife of the tropical rainforest along the Amazon. Third episode of three. Rebroadcast on December 4, 1983.
4	4	"Amate: The Great Fig Tree"	October 31, 1982
The local ecology of amate fig trees in Belize, including the tiny wasps they depend on for their fertilization. Rebroadcast on December 11, 1983.
5	5	"Kopje: A Rock for All Seasons"	November 7, 1982
Large rock outcroppings on Africa's Serengeti plains.
6	6	"On the Edge of Paradise"	November 14, 1982
A 300-mile archipelago in the Caribbean is threatened by industrialization.
7	7	"Forest in the Clouds"	November 21, 1982
A tropical rain forest in Costa Rica.
8	8	"The Discovery of Animal Behavior: Natural Mysteries"	November 28, 1982
Frederick II of Hohenstaufen studies animal behavior in the 13th century. First episode of a 6-part miniseries.
9	9	"The Discovery of Animal Behavior: In Praise of God"	December 5, 1982
Early studies of animal behavior by the naturalists John Ray, Charles-Georges Le Roy, and Daines Barrington. Second of six episodes.
10	10	"The Discovery of Animal Behavior: Search for the Mind"	December 12, 1982
Early studies of the animal mind by naturalists and zoologists. Third of six episodes.
11	11	"The Discovery of Animal Behavior: A Question of Learning"	December 19, 1982
Experiments by Ivan Pavlov, John B. Watson, B. F. Skinner, and William Thorpe begin to reveal how animals learn. Fourth of six episodes.
12	12	"The Discovery of Animal Behavior: Signs and Signals"	December 26, 1982
Karl von Frisch, Julian Huxley, Konrad Lorenz, and others investigate animal communication. Fifth of six episodes.
13	13	"The Discovery of Animal Behavior: Living Together"	January 2, 1983
Animal behavior in social groups. Final episode of 6-part miniseries.

=== Season 2 (1983–84) ===
No. overall	No. in season	Title	Original release date
14	1	"Forest in the Sea"	October 9, 1983
The underwater kelp forests which grow off the coast of California.
15	2	"Fungi: The Rotten World About Us"	October 16, 1983
16	3	"Acacia: Tree of Thorns"	October 23, 1983
The acacia trees of the African savannah, and the important role that they play in the ecosystem
17	4	"On the Tracks of the Wild Otter"	November 6, 1983
Filmmaker Hugh Miles spent three summers studying and filming the sea otter population on the Shetland Islands off the coast of Scotland.
18	5	"Secret Weapons"	November 13, 1983
The natural defenses which some animals use to ward off predators.
19	6	"Voices in the Forest"	December 18, 1983
The birds of Papua New Guinea.
20	7	"Osprey"	February 5, 1984
21	8	"Big Business in Bees"	February 12, 1984
22	9	"Jet Set Wildlife"	February 19, 1984
Invasive species find a new home in Florida, causing problems for the local wildlife.
23	10	"The Masterbuilders"	February 26, 1984
24	11	"Plight of the Bumblebee"	March 4, 1984
25	12	"The Missing Monsoon"	March 11, 1984
A severe drought strikes Keoladeo National Park in northern India, pushing the wildlife which live there to the brink.
26	13	"Resurrection at Truk Lagoon"	March 25, 1984
Truk Lagoon, once the site of an intense battle during World War II, is now home to an awesome array of tropical marine life.

=== Season 3 (1984–85) ===
No. overall	No. in season	Title	Original release date
27	1	"Krakatoa: The Day That Shook the World"	September 30, 1984
28	2	"Treasures of the Gulf"	October 7, 1984
29	3	"Sexual Encounters of the Floral Kind"	October 14, 1984
Originally broadcast in 1981 on The World About Us. Produced by Oxford Scientific Films Ltd.
30	4	"Fragments of Eden"	October 21, 1984
The Seychelles, a 90-island Indian Ocean archipelago, home to some of the rarest species of flora and fauna. Inhabitants include the majestically plumed black paradise flycatcher; the bare-legged scots owl and cave swiftlets, tiny birds that dwell in dark caverns.
31	5	"The Face of the Deep"	October 28, 1984
The Sargasso Sea, which harbors an array of odd-looking marine life.
32	6	"Yellowstone in Winter"	November 11, 1984
Yellowstone National Park during Winter is dramatically different compared to the Summer tourist season.
33	7	"Winter Days"	December 2, 1984
The British Isles during Winter.
34	8	"Kilimanjaro"	December 9, 1984
Africa's most famous mountain, Kilimanjaro, and its unique geology and ecology.
35	9	"Danube Delta"	December 16, 1984
The mouth of the Danube River, Europe's largest wetland, home to diverse animal species, is under threat from human development.
36	10	"Tumbler in the Sky"	January 13, 1985
37	11	"Kinabalu: Summit of Borneo"	January 20, 1985
38	12	"Birds of Paradox"	February 3, 1985
39	13	"Lost World of the Medusa"	February 17, 1985
The sea life of the Palau Islands.
40	14	"Kitum – the Elephant Cave"	March 10, 1985
41	15	"Rhino on the Run"	March 17, 1985
42	16	"Through Animal Eyes"	March 31, 1985
43	17	"Man's Best Friend"	April 28, 1985
44	18	"Namaqualand: Diary of a Desert Garden"	May 26, 1985

=== Season 4 (1985–86) ===
No. overall	No. in season	Title	Original release date
45	1	"And Then the Rains Came"	October 20, 1985
The Tiva River in Kenya dries up during a great drought, with devastating results for the local wildlife.
46	2	"Battle of the Leaves"	October 27, 1985
How plants use spines and chemicals to fight back against animals as well as against other plants.
47	3	"The Ganges Gharial"	November 3, 1985
The highly endangered gharial crocodilian of northern India.
48	4	"One Man's Island"	November 10, 1985
The story of the artist Keith Brockie, who illustrated and painted the wildlife of the Isle of May, a small island off the coast of Scotland.
49	5	"Selva Verde: The Green Jungle"	November 17, 1985
The tropical rain forest of Latin America, specifically Belize, Costa Rica, and Panama.
50	6	"The Plant Hunters"	November 24, 1985
Examines scientific efforts to save endangered plants from extinction and to make existing plants more useful to humans.
51	7	"Kalahari: Wilderness Without Water"	December 12, 1985
The animals of the Kalahari Desert of Botswana.
52	8	"Emas: High Plains of Brazil"	January 5, 1986
Emas National Park, located in south-central Brazil and measuring about 500 square miles in area, is a broad savannah home to the rhea, armadillo, anteater, and numerous other species.
53	9	"The Feathered Swarm"	January 26, 1986
The red-billed quelea, a small bird the size of a sparrow, exists in massive flocks numbering tens of thousands of individuals, and sweep through a landscape devouring everything in its path like a swarm of locusts.
54	10	"Kingdom of the Ice Bear: The Frozen Ocean"	February 16, 1986
A 3-part miniseries on Arctic wildlife.
55	11	"Kingdom of the Ice Bear: The Land of Beyond"	February 23, 1986
56	12	"Kingdom of the Ice Bear: The Final Challenge"	March 2, 1986
57	13	"Saguaro: Sentinel of the Desert"	March 9, 1986
58	14	"Death Trap"	March 23, 1986
Carnivorous plants.
59	15	"Aspen: Dancer on the Wind"	April 6, 1986
60	16	"Secrets of an African Jungle"	April 27, 1986
The wildlife of the jungle of Cameroon.
61	17	"Birdwatch from Florida"	May 4, 1986
62	18	"The Gooneys of Midway"	May 11, 1986
63	19	"Where Eagles Fly"	May 18, 1986
The lives of golden eagles living within the Scottish Highlands.
64	20	"The Skyhunters"	May 25, 1986
All about vultures.

=== Season 5 (1986–87) ===
No. overall	No. in season	Title	Original release date
65	1	"Alyeska: The Great Land"	October 19, 1986
Wildlife in Alaska's Brooks Range region includes scenes of caribou during the fall mating season; grizzlies feasting on roots; and migratory birds feeding on insects.
66	2	"Baja Lagoon"	October 26, 1986
67	3	"Galapagos: How They Got There"	November 2, 1986
A 3-part miniseries on the Galápagos Islands.
68	4	"Galapagos: Cold on the Equator"	November 9, 1986
69	5	"Galapagos: The Ocean Travelers"	November 16, 1986
70	6	"Pantanal: Prairie of the Great Waters"	November 23, 1986
71	7	"Cats"	December 7, 1986
72	8	"Leopard: A Darkness in the Grass"	December 14, 1986
73	9	"The Elephant Challenge"	January 18, 1987
74	10	"Ichkeul: Between the Desert and the Deep Blue Sea"	February 8, 1987
75	11	"In the Shadow of Fujisan: See No Evil"	February 22, 1987
A 3-part miniseries.
76	12	"In the Shadow of Fujisan: Bird of Happiness"	March 1, 1987
77	13	"In the Shadow of Fujisan: Long Live the Turtle"	March 8, 1987
78	14	"America's Wild Horses"	March 15, 1987
79	15	"Holy Land: A Wilderness Like Eden"	April 12, 1987
A 2-part miniseries on the wildlife of the Holy Land.
80	16	"Holy Land: Sweet Water, Bitter Sea"	April 19, 1987
81	17	"The Forgotten Garden"	April 26, 1987
82	18	"Lords of Hokkaido"	May 10, 1987
83	19	"Designed for Living"	May 17, 1987
84	20	"Masked Monkeys"	May 24, 1987

=== Season 6 (1987–88) ===
No. overall	No. in season	Title	Original release date
85	1	"The Flowing Oasis"	September 20, 1987
The ecology of the East Walker River in northwestern Nevada. Reran on November 6, 1988.
86	2	"Amazonia: A Burning Question"	September 27, 1987
Reran on December 25, 1988.
87	3	"Spirits of the Forest"	October 4, 1987
The wildlife of Madagascar, with a particular focus on lemurs. Reran on January 1, 1989.
88	4	"Perspectives of Paradise"	October 18, 1987
Reran on January 15, 1989.
89	5	"A Season in the Sun"	November 15, 1987
How wildlife survives the droughts and famines which often occur during the long dry season in eastern Africa. Reran on January 24, 1989.
90	6	"The Legend of the Lightning Bird"	November 22, 1987
91	7	"The Volcano Watchers"	November 29, 1987
A feature on Katia and Maurice Krafft and their volcano studies.
92	8	"Tiger!"	December 6, 1987
93	9	"Land of the Kiwi"	January 3, 1988
94	10	"Costa Rica: Paradise Reclaimed"	January 10, 1988
95	11	"In-Flight Movie; Birds of the Sun God"	January 24, 1988
96	12	"Hawaii: Islands of the Fire Goddess"	February 14, 1988
97	13	"Okavango: Jewel of the Kalahari: The Search for the Jewel"	February 21, 1988
A 3-part miniseries on the wildlife of the Okavango Delta.
98	14	"Okavango: Jewel of the Kalahari: The Living Jewel"	February 28, 1988
99	15	"Okavango: Jewel of the Kalahari: A New Challenge"	March 6, 1988
100	16	"Great Moments from Nature"	March 13, 1988
101	17	"Elephant: Lord of the Jungle"	March 20, 1988
102	18	"Miracle of the Scarlet Salmon"	March 27, 1988
103	19	"Cowboys, Caimans and Capybaras"	April 24, 1988
104	20	"Tom's River: Reflections of a River Keeper"	May 1, 1988
105	21	"The Coral Triangle"	June 12, 1988

=== Season 7 (1988–89) ===
No. overall	No. in season	Title	Original release date
106	1	"Bonebreakers' Mountain"	October 8, 1988
The wildlife of the Spanish Pyrenees.
107	2	"Extremadura: Spain's Forgotten Forest"	October 16, 1988
108	3	"Peacock's War"	October 30, 1988
109	4	"Nature of Australia: A Portrait of the Island Continent – A Separate Creation"	November 13, 1988
A 6-part miniseries on wildlife in Australia.
110	5	"Nature of Australia: A Portrait of the Island Continent – Seas Under Capricorn"	November 20, 1988
111	6	"Nature of Australia: A Portrait of the Island Continent – The Making of the Bush"	November 27, 1988
112	7	"Nature of Australia: A Portrait of the Island Continent – The Sunburnt Country"	December 4, 1988
113	8	"Nature of Australia: A Portrait of the Island Continent – The Land of Flood and Fire"	December 11, 1988
114	9	"Nature of Australia: A Portrait of the Island Continent – End of Isolation"	December 18, 1988
115	10	"Night Hunters"	January 8, 1989
116	11	"Beyond Timbuktu"	February 2, 1989
117	12	"Under the Emerald Sea"	February 19, 1989
118	13	"Wild Waterfalls"	February 26, 1989
119	14	"Meerkats United / The Bee-Team"	March 5, 1989
120	15	"Icebird"	March 12, 1989
121	16	"Mozu the Snow Monkey"	March 19, 1989
122	17	"The Everglades: Rain Machine"	March 26, 1989
123	18	"Islands in the Sky"	April 16, 1989
124	19	"Rulers of the Wind"	April 30, 1989
125	20	"Kariba: The Lake That Made a Dent"	May 14, 1989

=== Season 8 (1989–90) ===
No. overall	No. in season	Title	Original release date
126	1	"The Great Rift: Footprints in the Valley"	October 8, 1989
A 3-part miniseries on the African Rift Valley.
127	2	"The Great Rift: Out of the Ashes"	October 15, 1989
128	3	"The Great Rift: Breaking the Continent"	October 22, 1989
129	4	"Under the Ice"	October 29, 1989
130	5	"Land of Dragons"	November 12, 1989
131	6	"The Great Wood of Caledon"	November 19, 1989
132	7	"Gorillas"	December 10, 1989
133	8	"Forest of Fear"	December 17, 1989
134	9	"Gran Paradiso"	January 7, 1990
135	10	"Cranes of the Grey Wind"	January 21, 1990
136	11	"King Solomon's Mountains"	February 4, 1990
137	12	"Hunters of the Sky"	February 11, 1990
138	13	"A Wolf in the Fold"	February 18, 1990
139	14	"The Colorado"	March 4, 1990
140	15	"The Emerald Isle"	March 11, 1990
141	16	"Giant Otters"	March 18, 1990
142	17	"The Haida Gwaii: Islands of the People"	March 25, 1990
143	18	"Presque Isle: Land in Motion"	April 1, 1990
144	19	"Yellowstone on Fire"	April 8, 1990
145	20	"Serpents"	April 15, 1990

=== Season 9 (1990–91) ===
No. overall	No. in season	Title	Original release date
146	1	"Seasons in the Sea"	September 30, 1990
147	2	"Monkeys on the Edge"	October 7, 1990
148	3	"Scandinavia: Land of the Midnight Sun"	October 14, 1990
A 2-part miniseries on the wildlife of Scandinavia.
149	4	"Scandinavia: Fresh Waters, Salt Seas"	October 21, 1990
150	5	"The Sisterhood"	November 11, 1990
151	6	"Supersense: Sight and Sound"	November 18, 1990
A 3-part miniseries.
152	7	"Supersense: Super Scents and Beyond"	November 25, 1990
153	8	"Supersense: Making Sense"	December 2, 1990
154	9	"Monkey Island"	December 9, 1990
155	10	"Grizzly Country"	December 16, 1990
156	11	"The Wild Shores of Patagonia"	January 13, 1991
157	12	"The Gulf: Portrait of the War Zone"	February 17, 1991
158	13	"One Man's Kenya"	February 24, 1991
159	14	"The Elephants of Tsavo: Love and Betrayal"	March 3, 1991
160	15	"Grand Teton Wilderness"	March 10, 1991
161	16	"Year of the Jackal"	March 17, 1991
162	17	"Black Bear of the North"	March 24, 1991
163	18	"Wild Dogs of Africa"	April 7, 1991
164	19	"Marathon Bird"	April 14, 1991
165	20	"The Cat That Came in from the Cold"	April 28, 1991
166	21	"Crown of the Continent: Waterton / Glacier National Park"	May 12, 1991

=== Season 10 (1991–92) ===
No. overall	No. in season	Title	Original release date
167	1	"From the Heart of the World: The Elder Brothers' Warning"	September 28, 1991
168	2	"Vietnam: A Country, Not a War"	October 13, 1991
169	3	"Kali the Lion"	November 3, 1991
170	4	"Madagascar: Island of Ghosts"	November 17, 1991
171	5	"Land of the Eagle: The Great Encounter"	November 24, 1991
An 8-part miniseries.
172	6	"Land of the Eagle: Confronting the Wilderness"	November 24, 1991
173	7	"Land of the Eagle: Conquering Swamps"	November 25, 1991
174	8	"Land of the Eagle: Across the Seas of Grass"	November 25, 1991
175	9	"Land of the Eagle: Into the Shining Mountains"	November 26, 1991
176	10	"Land of the Eagle: Living on the Edge"	November 26, 1991
177	11	"Land of the Eagle: The First and Last Frontier"	November 27, 1991
178	12	"Land of the Eagle: Searching for Paradise"	November 27, 1991
179	13	"Great Moments with Nature's Filmmakers"	December 8, 1991
180	14	"Horse Tigers"	January 5, 1992
181	15	"Arctic Wanderers"	January 12, 1992
182	16	"Ladakh: Kingdom in the Clouds"	January 19, 1992
183	17	"Tiwai: Island of the Apes"	February 9, 1992
184	18	"A Celebration of Birds with Roger Tory Peterson"	February 16, 1992
185	19	"Elephant Seals: Those Magnificent Diving Machines"	March 1, 1992
186	20	"Dolphins: Close Encounters"	March 8, 1992
187	21	"Last Stand of the Giants"	May 31, 1992

=== Season 11 (1992–93) ===
No. overall	No. in season	Title	Original release date
188	1	"Realms of the Russian Bear: Green Jewel of the Caspian"	October 5, 1992
A 6-part miniseries.
189	2	"Realms of the Russian Bear: The Arctic Frontier"	October 5, 1992
190	3	"Realms of the Russian Bear: The Red Deserts"	October 6, 1992
191	4	"Realms of the Russian Bear: The Celestial Mountains"	October 6, 1992
192	5	"Realms of the Russian Bear: Siberia, the Frozen Forest"	October 7, 1992
193	6	"Realms of the Russian Bear: Born of Fire"	October 7, 1992
194	7	"Shadows in a Desert Sea"	October 18, 1992
195	8	"The Tree of Music"	October 25, 1992
196	9	"Slaves to the Queen"	November 29, 1992
197	10	"Ice Fox: Struggle for Survival"	January 10, 1993
198	11	"Cheetahs in the Land of Lions"	January 24, 1993
199	12	"New Guinea: Land of the Unexpected – Island Invaders"	February 3, 1993
First part of a 2-part miniseries.
200	13	"New Guinea: Land of the Unexpected – Other Worlds"	February 3, 1993
Second part of a 2-part miniseries.
201	14	"Gorilla: King of the Congo"	February 14, 1993
202	15	"American Trickster"	February 21, 1993
203	16	"Hebrides: The Secret Islands"	February 28, 1993
204	17	"Echo of the Elephants"	March 14, 1993
205	18	"The Ghosts of Ruby"	May 9, 1993
206	19	"The Bandit and the Builder"	May 16, 1993
207	20	"Spirit of the Sound"	May 23, 1993

=== Season 12 (1993–94) ===
No. overall	No. in season	Title	Original release date
208	1	"In the Company of Wolves with Timothy Dalton"	October 3, 1993
209	2	"Treasure of the Andes"	October 10, 1993
210	3	"Echoes from the Ice"	November 7, 1993
211	4	"The Nature of Sex: The Primal Instinct"	November 22, 1993
A 6-part miniseries.
212	5	"The Nature of Sex: A Time and a Place"	November 22, 1993
213	6	"The Nature of Sex: The Sex Contract"	November 23, 1993
214	7	"The Nature of Sex: Sex and the Human Animal"	November 23, 1993
215	8	"The Nature of Sex: A Miracle in the Making"	November 24, 1993
216	9	"The Nature of Sex: Young Ones"	November 24, 1993
217	10	"Nature's Great African Moments"	December 5, 1993
218	11	"Anima Mundi: Before It's Too Late"	January 23, 1994
219	12	"Phantom of the Forest"	February 20, 1994
220	13	"Sea Otter Story: Warm Hearts & Cold Water"	March 13, 1994
221	14	"Toadskin Spell"	May 15, 1994

=== Season 13 (1994–95) ===
No. overall	No. in season	Title	Original release date
222	1	"In the Lion's Den with Anthony Hopkins"	October 2, 1994
223	2	"Pandas of the Sleeping Dragon"	October 9, 1994
224	3	"Warts and All"	November 6, 1994
225	4	"Nomads of the Wind: The Faraway Heaven"	November 12, 1994
A 5-part miniseries.
226	5	"Nomads of the Wind: Crossroads of the Pacific"	November 20, 1994
227	6	"Nomads of the Wind: Burning Their Boats"	November 21, 1994
228	7	"Nomads of the Wind: Distant Horizons"	November 21, 1994
229	8	"Nomads of the Wind: The Pierced Sky"	November 22, 1994
230	9	"Fire Bird"	January 8, 1995
231	10	"Creatures in Crime"	February 5, 1995
232	11	"Tigers with Bob Hoskins"	February 26, 1995
233	12	"Ghost Bear"	March 5, 1995
234	13	"Born to Run"	May 21, 1995

=== Season 14 (1995–96) ===
No. overall	No. in season	Title	Original release date
235	1	"Jaguar: Year of the Cat"	October 8, 1995
236	2	"Incredible Suckers"	October 15, 1995
237	3	"Monkey in the Mirror"	November 5, 1995
238	4	"The World of Penguins"	December 3, 1995
239	5	"Castaways of Sulawesi"	December 17, 1995
240	6	"Hunters of the Sea Wind"	January 14, 1996
241	7	"Parrots: Look Who's Talking"	February 4, 1996
242	8	"Alien Empire: Hardware Replicators"	February 11, 1996
A 3-part miniseries. Guest Narrator: John Shrapnel.
243	9	"Alien Empire: Battlezone Metropolis"	February 12, 1996
244	10	"Alien Empire: Voyagers and War of the Worlds"	February 13, 1996
245	11	"Jane Goodall's Wild Chimpanzees"	March 3, 1996
246	12	"Victims of Venom"	March 31, 1996
247	13	"The Call of Kakadu"	May 5, 1996
248	14	"Monsoon"	May 12, 1996

=== Season 15 (1996–97) ===
No. overall	No. in season	Title	Original release date
249	1	"Sperm Whales: The Real Moby Dick"	October 13, 1996
250	2	"The Crater Lions"	October 20, 1996
251	3	"Mask of the Mandrill"	November 10, 1996
252	4	"The Joy of Pigs"	November 17, 1996
253	5	"Echo of the Elephants: The Next Generation"	December 8, 1996
254	6	"Wolves and Buffalo: The Last Frontier"	January 12, 1997
255	7	"The Elephant Men"	February 16, 1997
256	8	"A Lemur's Tale"	February 23, 1997
257	9	"Extraordinary Dogs"	March 9, 1997
258	10	"Bower Bird Blues"	April 13, 1997
259	11	"Spirits of the Jaguar: The Forging of a New World"	May 11, 1997
A 4-part miniseries.
260	12	"Spirits of the Jaguar: Forests of the Maya"	May 12, 1997
261	13	"Spirits of the Jaguar: Hunters of the Caribbean Sea"	May 13, 1997
262	14	"Spirits of the Jaguar: The Fifth World of the Aztecs"	May 14, 1997

=== Season 16 (1997–98) ===
No. overall	No. in season	Title	Original release date
263	1	"Toothwalkers: Giants of the Arctic Ice"	October 12, 1997
264	2	"Grand Canyon"	October 19, 1997
265	3	"Animal Attractions: Amazing Tales from the San Diego Zoo"	November 9, 1997
266	4	"The Elephants of Africa"	November 16, 1997
267	5	"Orangutans: Just Hangin' On"	December 7, 1997
268	6	"Yellowstone Otters"	January 18, 1998
269	7	"Gremlins: Faces in the Forest"	February 1, 1998
270	8	"Life at the Edge of the Sea"	March 1, 1998
271	9	"Secret Garden"	March 29, 1998
272	10	"Forces of the Wild: In the Beginning"	April 26, 1998
A 5-part miniseries.
273	11	"Forces of the Wild: Perpetual Motion"	April 27, 1998
274	12	"Forces of the Wild: Heavenly Partners"	April 27, 1998
275	13	"Forces of the Wild: Living Dangerously"	April 27, 1998
276	14	"Forces of the Wild: Playing With Fire"	May 3, 1998
277	15	"Eagles"	May 17, 1998
278	16	"The Wild Side of New York"	June 14, 1998

=== Season 17 (1998–99) ===
No. overall	No. in season	Title	Original release date
279	1	"Great White Bear"	October 11, 1998
280	2	"The Secret World of Sharks and Rays"	October 18, 1998
281	3	"American Buffalo: Spirit of a Nation"	November 1, 1998
282	4	"India, Land of the Tiger: Tiger's Domain"	November 15, 1998
A 6-part miniseries.
283	5	"India, Land of the Tiger: Sacred Waters"	November 15, 1998
284	6	"India, Land of the Tiger: Unknown Seas"	November 16, 1998
285	7	"India, Land of the Tiger: Desert Kingdom"	November 16, 1998
286	8	"India, Land of the Tiger: Mountains of Gods"	November 17, 1998
287	9	"India, Land of the Tiger: Monsoon Forests"	November 17, 1998
288	10	"John Denver: Let This Be a Voice"	December 6, 1998
289	11	"Serengeti Stories"	January 10, 1999
290	12	"Iceland: Fire and Ice"	February 7, 1999
291	13	"Walking with Giants: The Grizzlies of Siberia"	February 14, 1999
292	14	"Extraordinary Cats"	February 21, 1999
293	15	"The Seedy Side of Plants"	May 23, 1999
294	16	"A Conversation with Koko"	August 8, 1999

=== Season 18 (1999–2000) ===
No. overall	No. in season	Title	Original release date
295	1	"Antarctica: The End of Earth – Katabatic"	October 24, 1999
Part 1 of 2:
296	2	"Antarctica: The End of Earth – Iceberg"	October 31, 1999
Part 2 of 2:
297	3	"Horses"	November 14, 1999
298	4	"Sled Dogs: An Alaskan Epic"	November 21, 1999
299	5	"Wisdom of the Wild"	December 5, 1999
300	6	"Inside the Animal Mind: Are Animals Intelligent?"	January 4, 2000
A 3-part miniseries.
301	7	"Humpback Whales"	January 9, 2000
302	8	"Inside the Animal Mind: Do Animal Have Emotions?"	January 11, 2000
303	9	"Inside the Animal Mind: Animal Consciousness"	January 18, 2000
304	10	"Cheetahs in a Hot Spot"	February 6, 2000
305	11	"Showdown at Grizzly River"	February 13, 2000
306	12	"Jackals of the African Crater"	February 27, 2000
307	13	"Obsession with Orchids"	April 16, 2000
308	14	"Earth Navigators"	April 23, 2000
309	15	"The Body Changers"	May 7, 2000
310	16	"Springs Eternal: Florida's Fountain of Youth"	May 14, 2000

=== Season 19 (2000–01) ===
No. overall	No. in season	Title	Original release date
311	1	"Wild Horses of Mongolia with Julia Roberts"	October 22, 2000
312	2	"The Octopus Show"	October 29, 2000
313	3	"Extraordinary Birds"	November 12, 2000
314	4	"The Urban Elephant"	November 19, 2000
315	5	"Intimate Enemies: Lions and Buffalo"	December 17, 2000
316	6	"Polar Bear Invasion"	January 7, 2001
317	7	"Triumph of Life: The Four Billion Year War"	January 14, 2001
A 6-part miniseries.
318	8	"Triumph of Life: The Mating Game"	January 21, 2001
319	9	"Triumph of Life: The Eternal Arms Race"	January 28, 2001
320	10	"Triumph of Life: Winning Teams"	February 4, 2001
321	11	"Triumph of Life: Brain Power"	February 11, 2001
322	12	"Triumph of Life: The Survivors"	February 18, 2001
323	13	"Baby Tales"	March 4, 2001
324	14	"The Panda Baby"	April 1, 2001
325	15	"Golden Seals of the Skeleton Coast"	May 6, 2001
326	16	"Australia's Little Assassins"	May 20, 2001

=== Season 20 (2001–02) ===
No. overall	No. in season	Title	Original release date
327	1	"Cloud: Wild Stallion of the Rockies"	November 4, 2001
See the Swedish Wikipedia article.
328	2	"Dogs: The Early Years"	November 11, 2001
329	3	"Animals Behaving Badly"	November 18, 2001
330	4	"Ravens"	December 16, 2001
331	5	"Condition Black"	January 13, 2002
332	6	"The White Elephants of Thailand With Meg Ryan"	February 10, 2002
333	7	"Song of the Earth With David Attenborough"	April 7, 2002
334	8	"Big Red Roos"	April 14, 2002
335	9	"The Polar Bears of Churchill With Ewan McGregor"	May 19, 2002

=== Season 21 (2002–03) ===
No. overall	No. in season	Title	Original release date
336	1	"Tall Blondes"	October 13, 2002
337	2	"Horse and Rider"	October 20, 2002
338	3	"Dive to the Abyss"	October 27, 2002
339	4	"Bloody Suckers"	November 17, 2002
340	5	"Living Edens: Big Sur – California's Wild Coast"	November 24, 2002
A special presentation of Nature.
341	6	"Trail of the Cougar"	December 15, 2002
342	7	"Under Antarctic Ice"	January 12, 2003
343	8	"The Reptiles: Alligators and Crocodiles"	February 2, 2003
A 4-part miniseries.
344	9	"The Reptiles: Snakes"	February 9, 2003
345	10	"The Reptiles: Turtles and Tortoises"	February 16, 2003
346	11	"The Reptiles: Lizards"	February 23, 2003
347	12	"Lost World of the Holy Land"	April 13, 2003
348	13	"Leopards of Yala"	April 20, 2003
349	14	"A Mystery in Alaska"	May 11, 2003
350	15	"War Wrecks of the Coral Seas"	May 18, 2003

=== Season 22 (2003–04) ===
No. overall	No. in season	Title	Original release date
351	1	"Hippo Beach"	October 19, 2003
352	2	"Kalahari: The Great Thirstland"	November 2, 2003
A 2-part miniseries.
353	3	"Kalahari: The Flooded Deserts"	November 9, 2003
354	4	"White Shark / Red Triangle"	November 16, 2003
355	5	"Cloud's Legacy: The Wild Stallion Returns"	November 23, 2003
356	6	"Shadow Over the Suns: The Story of Eagles"	January 18, 2004
357	7	"Diamonds"	February 8, 2004
358	8	"The Real Macaw"	February 15, 2004
359	9	"Holy Cow"	February 22, 2004
360	10	"Pale Male"	March 16, 2004
361	11	"Ireland"	March 28, 2004
362	12	"Flight School"	April 11, 2004
363	13	"Land of the Falling Lakes"	April 18, 2004

=== Season 23 (2004–05) ===
No. overall	No. in season	Title	Original release date
364	1	"Chasing Big Cats"	November 7, 2004
365	2	"Shark Mountain"	November 14, 2004
366	3	"The Good, The Bad, The Grizzly"	November 21, 2004
367	4	"Violent Hawaii"	January 9, 2005
368	5	"Silent Roar: Searching for the Snow Leopard"	January 16, 2005
369	6	"Cuba: Wild Island of the Caribbean"	January 30, 2005
370	7	"From Orphan to King"	February 13, 2005
371	8	"Snowflake: The White Gorilla"	February 20, 2005
372	9	"The Venom Cure"	April 3, 2005
373	10	"Deep Jungle: New Frontiers"	April 17, 2005
A 3-part miniseries.
374	11	"Deep Jungle: Monsters of the Forest"	April 24, 2005
375	12	"Deep Jungle: The Beast Within"	May 1, 2005
376	13	"The Dolphin Defender"	May 15, 2005

=== Season 24 (2005–06) ===
No. overall	No. in season	Title	Original release date
377	1	"Killers in Eden"	November 6, 2005
378	2	"Can Animals Predict Disaster?"	November 13, 2005
379	3	"Katrina's Animal Rescue"	November 20, 2005
380	4	"Encountering Seas Monsters"	December 18, 2005
381	5	"Life in Death Valley"	January 8, 2006
382	6	"Oceans in Glass: Behind the Scenes at the Monterey Bay Aquarium"	January 22, 2006
383	7	"Underdogs"	January 29, 2006
384	8	"True Adventures of the Ultimate Spider-Hunter"	February 12, 2006
385	9	"Animals Behaving Worse"	February 19, 2006
386	10	"Murder in the Troop"	April 2, 2006
387	11	"The Queen of Trees"	April 9, 2006
388	12	"The Vanishing Lions"	April 30, 2006
389	13	"Crime Scene Creatures"	May 7, 2006

=== Season 25 (2006–07) ===
No. overall	No. in season	Title	Original release date
390	1	"Chimpanzees: An Unnatural History"	November 5, 2006
391	2	"Penguins of the Antarctic"	November 12, 2006
392	3	"Christmas in Yellowstone"	November 19, 2006
393	4	"The Best of Nature: 25 Years"	January 14, 2007
394	5	"Rhinoceros"	January 28, 2007
395	6	"Supersize Crocs"	February 11, 2007
396	7	"Raptor Force"	February 18, 2007
397	8	"Andes: The Dragon's Back"	February 25, 2007
398	9	"Unforgettable Elephants"	April 1, 2007
399	10	"Voyage of the Lonely Turtle"	April 15, 2007
400	11	"Dogs That Changed the World: The Rise of the Dog"	April 22, 2007
A 2-part miniseries.
401	12	"Dogs That Changed the World: Dogs by Design"	April 29, 2007
402	13	"Sharkland"	May 6, 2007

=== Season 26 (2007–08) ===
No. overall	No. in season	Title	Original release date
403	1	"Silence of the Bees"	October 28, 2007
This episode earned a Peabody Award.
404	2	"In the Valley of the Wolves"	November 4, 2007
405	3	"The Cheetah Orphans"	November 11, 2007
406	4	"The Beauty of Ugly"	November 18, 2007
407	5	"The Desert Lions"	January 6, 2008
408	6	"Parrots in the Land of Oz"	January 27, 2008
409	7	"Crash: A Tale of Two Species"	February 2, 2008
Species featured: Red knot and Limulidae
410	8	"Arctic Bears"	February 17, 2008
411	9	"What Females Want"	April 6, 2008
A 2-part miniseries.
412	10	"What Males Will Do"	April 13, 2008
413	11	"The Gorilla King"	April 20, 2008
414	12	"Superfish"	May 4, 2008
415	13	"Prince of the Alps"	May 11, 2008

=== Season 27 (2008–09) ===
No. overall	No. in season	Title	Original release date
416	1	"White Falcon, White Wolf"	October 26, 2008
417	2	"Clever Monkeys"	November 9, 2008
418	3	"American Eagle"	November 16, 2008
419	4	"The Wolf That Changed America"	November 23, 2008
420	5	"The Dragon Chronicles"	January 11, 2009
421	6	"Is That Skunk?"	January 25, 2009
422	7	"Drakensberg: Barrier of Spears"	February 8, 2009
423	8	"Why We Love Cats and Dogs"	February 15, 2009
424	9	"Kilauea: Mountain of Fire"	March 29, 2009
425	10	"Frogs: The Thin Green Line"	April 5, 2009
426	11	"The Loneliest Animals"	April 19, 2009
427	12	"Eagles of Mull"	May 3, 2009
Broadcast in 2005 on Natural World as "Eagle Island"
428	13	"Victoria Falls"	May 17, 2009

=== Season 28 (2009–10) ===
No. overall	No. in season	Title	Original release date
429	1	"Cloud: Challenge of the Stallions"	October 25, 2009
430	2	"Born Wild: The First Day of Life"	November 1, 2009
431	3	"Black Mamba"	November 8, 2009
432	4	"Fellowship of the Whales"	November 15, 2009
433	5	"Hummingbirds: Magic in the Air"	January 10, 2010
434	6	"Clash: Encounters of Bears and Wolves"	January 17, 2010
435	7	"Wild Balkans"	January 31, 2010
436	8	"Invasion of the Giant Pythons"	February 21, 2010
437	9	"Moment of Impact: Hunters & Herds"	April 4, 2010
438	10	"Moment of Impact: Jungle"	April 11, 2010

=== Season 29 (2010–11) ===
No. overall	No. in season	Title	Original release date
439	1	"Cuba: The Accidental Eden"	September 26, 2010
440	2	"Echo: An Elephant to Remember"	October 17, 2010
441	3	"A Murder of Crows"	October 24, 2010
442	4	"Braving Iraq"	November 7, 2010
443	5	"Wolverine: Chasing the Phantom"	November 14, 2010
444	6	"Revealing the Leopard"	November 21, 2010
445	7	"Elsa's Legacy: The Born Free Story"	January 9, 2011
446	8	"Birds of the Gods"	January 23, 2011
447	9	"The Himalayas"	February 13, 2011
448	10	"Broken Tail: A Tiger's Last Journey"	February 20, 2011
449	11	"Outback Pelicans"	March 27, 2011
450	12	"Survivors of the Firestorm"	April 17, 2011
451	13	"Salmon: Running the Gauntlet"	May 1, 2011
452	14	"Bears of the Last Frontier: City of Bears"	May 8, 2011
A 3-part miniseries.
453	15	"Bears of the Last Frontier: The Road North"	May 15, 2011
454	16	"Bears of the Last Frontier: Arctic Wanderers"	May 22, 2011

=== Season 30 (2011–12) ===
No. overall	No. in season	Title	Original release date
455	1	"Radioactive Wolves"	October 19, 2011
456	2	"The Animal House"	November 2, 2011
457	3	"Jungle Eagle"	November 9, 2011
458	4	"My Life as a Turkey"	November 16, 2011
459	5	"Kangaroo Mob"	January 11, 2012
460	6	"Fortress of the Bears"	January 25, 2012
461	7	"Raccoon Nation"	February 8, 2012
462	8	"Ocean Giants: Giant Lives"	March 28, 2012
463	9	"Ocean Giants: Deep Thinkers"	April 4, 2012
464	10	"Ocean Giants: Voices of the Sea"	April 11, 2012
465	11	"River of No Return"	April 18, 2012
466	12	"The White Lions"	May 9, 2012
467	13	"Cracking the Koala Code"	May 16, 2012

=== Season 31 (2012–13) ===
No. overall	No. in season	Title	Original release date
468	1	"Siberian Tiger Quest"	October 10, 2012
469	2	"Magic of the Snowy Owl"	October 24, 2012
470	3	"Animal Odd Couples"	November 7, 2012
471	4	"An Original DUCKumentary"	November 14, 2012
472	5	"Attenborough's Life Stories: Life on Camera"	January 23, 2013
A 3-part miniseries.
473	6	"Attenborough's Life Stories: Understanding the Natural World"	January 30, 2013
474	7	"Attenborough's Life Stories: Our Fragile Planet"	February 6, 2013
475	8	"Cold Warriors: Wolves and Buffalo"	February 13, 2013
476	9	"What Plants Talk About"	April 3, 2013
477	10	"The Mystery of Eels"	April 17, 2013
478	11	"Legendary White Stallions"	May 1, 2013
479	12	"The Private Life of Deer"	May 8, 2013
480	13	"Great Zebra Exodus"	May 15, 2013

=== Season 32 (2013–14) ===
No. overall	No. in season	Title	Original release date
481	1	"Earthflight: North America"	September 4, 2013
Part 1 of 6: This BBC six-part nature documentary series was created by John Downer and originally aired on BBC One beginning on December 29, 2011. Its narrative was re-recorded for PBS and aired as a Nature special presentation.
482	2	"Earthflight: Africa"	September 11, 2013
Part 2 of 6:
483	3	"Earthflight: Europe"	September 18, 2013
Part 3 of 6:
484	4	"Earthflight: South America"	September 25, 2013
Part 4 of 6:
485	5	"Earthflight: Asia and Australia"	October 2, 2013
Part 5 of 6:
486	6	"Earthflight: Flying High"	October 9, 2013
Part 6 of 6:
487	7	"Saving Otter 501"	October 16, 2013
488	8	"Love in the Animal Kingdom"	November 6, 2013
489	9	"Parrot Confidential"	November 13, 2013
490	10	"Meet the Coywolf"	January 22, 2014
491	11	"The Funkiest Monkeys"	January 29, 2014
492	12	"Honey Badgers: Masters of Mayhem"	February 19, 2014
493	13	"Ireland's Wild River"	March 5, 2014
494	14	"My Bionic Pet"	April 9, 2014
495	15	"Touching the Wild"	April 16, 2014
496	16	"Snow Monkeys"	April 23, 2014
497	17	"Leave It to Beavers"	May 14, 2014
498	18	"The Gathering Swarms"	May 21, 2014
499	19	"Fabulous Frogs"	June 25, 2014

=== Season 33 (2014–15) ===
No. overall	No. in season	Title	Original release date
500	1	"Penguins: Spy in the Huddle – The Journey"	September 24, 2014
A Nature special presentation. Part 1 of 3:
501	2	"Penguins: Spy in the Huddle – First Steps"	October 1, 2014
502	3	"Penguins: Spy in the Huddle – Growing Up"	October 8, 2014
503	4	"Animal Misfits"	October 15, 2014
504	5	"A Sloth Named Velcro"	November 5, 2014
505	6	"Invasion of the Killer Whales"	November 19, 2014
506	7	"Best of Birds"	December 10, 2014
A Nature special presentation.
507	8	"Wild France"	January 7, 2015
508	9	"Penguin Post Office"	January 28, 2015
509	10	"Owl Power"	February 18, 2015
510	11	"The Last Orangutan Eden"	February 25, 2015
511	12	"Animal Homes: The Nest"	April 8, 2015
A 3-part Nature special presentation.
512	13	"Animal Homes: Location, Location, Location"	April 15, 2015
513	14	"Animal Homes: Animal Cities"	April 22, 2015
514	15	"Mystery Monkeys of Shangri-La"	April 29, 2015
515	16	"Animal Childhood"	May 13, 2015
516	17	"The Sagebrush Sea"	May 20, 2015

=== Season 34 (2015–16) ===
No. overall	No. in season	Title	Original release date	Prod. code
517	1	"Nature’s Miracle Orphans: Second Chances"	September 23, 2015	3301
Part 1 of 2:
518	2	"Nature’s Miracle Orphans: Wild Lessons"	September 30, 2015	3302
Part 2 of 2:
519	3	"Big Birds Can’t Fly"	October 7, 2015	3303
520	4	"Soul of the Elephant"	October 14, 2015	3304
521	5	"Pets: Wild At Heart – Playful Creatures"	October 21, 2015	3305
A 2-part miniseries.
522	6	"Pets: Wild At Heart – Secretive Creatures"	October 28, 2015	3306
523	7	"Natural Born Hustlers: Staying Alive"	January 13, 2016	3307
A 3-part miniseries.
524	8	"Natural Born Hustlers: The Hunger Hustle"	January 20, 2016	3308
525	9	"Natural Born Hustlers: Sex, Lies & Dirty Tricks"	January 27, 2016	3309
526	10	"Moose: Life of a Twig Eater"	February 10, 2016	3310
527	11	"Raising the Dinosaur Giant"	February 17, 2016	3311
528	12	"Snow Chick"	February 24, 2016	3312
529	13	"Animal Reunions"	March 30, 2016	3313
530	14	"India's Wandering Lions"	April 13, 2016	3314
531	15	"Nature's Perfect Partners"	May 11, 2016	3315
532	16	"Jungle Animal Hospital"	May 18, 2016	3316

=== Season 35 (2016–17) ===
No. overall	No. in season	Title	Original release date
533	1	"Super Hummingbirds"	October 12, 2016
534	2	"My Congo"	October 19, 2016
535	3	"Giraffes: Africa’s Gentle Giants"	October 26, 2016
536	4	"The Story of Cats: Asia to Africa"	November 2, 2016
Part 1 of 2: A miniseries on the cat species of the world.
537	5	"The Story of Cats: Into the Americas"	November 9, 2016
Part 2 of 2: The evolution of cats after entering the Americas and the domestic cats diversify into forty breeds.
538	6	"Snowbound: Animals of Winter"	January 11, 2017
539	7	"Spy in the Wild: Love"	February 1, 2017
A 5-part Nature special presentation.
540	8	"Spy in the Wild: Intelligence"	February 8, 2017
541	9	"Spy in the Wild: Friendship"	February 15, 2017
542	10	"Spy in the Wild: Bad Behavior"	February 22, 2017
543	11	"Spy in the Wild: Meet the Spies"	March 1, 2017
544	12	"Yosemite"	March 29, 2017
545	13	"Viva Puerto Rico"	April 12, 2017
546	14	"Hotel Armadillo"	April 19, 2017
547	15	"Forest of the Lynx"	April 26, 2017
548	16	"Dolphins: Spy in the Pod – Episode 1"	May 3, 2017
A 2-part miniseries on dolphins.
549	17	"Dolphins: Spy in the Pod – Episode 2"	May 10, 2017

=== Season 36 (2017–18) ===
No. overall	No. in season	Title	Original release date	Prod. code
550	1	"Naledi: One Little Elephant"	October 4, 2017	3501
A Nature special presentation.
551	2	"Fox Tales"	October 11, 2017	3502
552	3	"Charlie and the Curious Otters"	October 25, 2017	3503
553	4	"H Is for Hawk: A New Chapter"	November 1, 2017	3504
554	5	"The Cheetah Children"	November 8, 2017	3505
555	6	"Nature's Miniature Miracles"	November 22, 2017	3506
556	7	"Arctic Wolf Pack"	January 17, 2018	3507
557	8	"Animals with Cameras: Episode 1"	January 31, 2018	-
First part of a 3-part Nature miniseries special presentation.
558	9	"Animals with Cameras: Episode 2"	February 7, 2018	-
Second part of a 3-part Nature miniseries special presentation.
559	10	"Animals with Cameras: Episode 3"	February 14, 2018	-
Third part of a 3-part Nature miniseries special presentation.
560	11	"The Last Rhino"	February 21, 2018	3508
561	12	"Sex, Lies and Butterflies"	April 4, 2018	3509
562	13	"Natural Born Rebels: Hunger Wars"	April 25, 2018	3510
First part of a 3-part Nature miniseries.
563	14	"Natural Born Rebels: Survival"	May 2, 2018	3511
Second part of a 3-part Nature miniseries.
564	15	"Natural Born Rebels: The Mating Game"	May 9, 2018	3512
Third part of a 3-part Nature miniseries.
565	16	"The World's Most Wanted Animal"	May 23, 2018	3513

=== Season 37 (2018–19) ===
No. overall	No. in season	Title	Original release date	Prod. code
566	1	"Super Cats: Extreme Lives"	October 24, 2018	3601
567	2	"Super Cats: Cats in Every Corner"	October 31, 2018	3602
568	3	"Super Cats: Science and Secrets"	November 7, 2018	3603
569	4	"A Squirrel's Guide to Success"	November 14, 2018	3604
570	5	"Dogs in the Land of Lions"	November 21, 2018	3605
571	6	"Snow Bears"	November 28, 2018	3606
572	7	"Attenborough and the Sea Dragon"	January 9, 2019	3607
A PBS and BBC Earth special presentation.
573	8	"Equus: Story of the Horse – Origins"	January 16, 2019	3608
574	9	"Equus: Story of the Horse – Chasing the Wind"	January 23, 2019	3609
575	10	"Wild Way of the Vikings"	February 13, 2019	3610
Ewan McGregor narrates.
576	11	"Living Volcanoes"	February 20, 2019	3611
577	12	"The Egg: Life's Perfect Invention"	April 10, 2019	3612
578	13	"American Spring LIVE: Birth and Rebirth"	April 29, 2019	3613
579	14	"American Spring LIVE: Migration"	April 30, 2019	3614
580	15	"American Spring LIVE: Connections"	May 1, 2019	3615

=== Season 38 (2019–20) ===
No. overall	No. in season	Title	Original release date	Prod. code
581	1	"Octopus: Making Contact"	October 2, 2019	3701
582	2	"The Serengeti Rules"	October 9, 2019	3702
In the 1960s, scientists explored wilderness, curios how nature works. From the Serengeti, the Amazon jungle, the Arctic ocean, to Pacific tide pools, they discovered a single set of rules that govern all life. Bob Paine, Jim Estes, Mary Power, Tony Sinclair, and John Terborgh share their adventures and how their work changed our view of nature. Among the millions of species on Our Planet, some are key; i.e., keystone species, because they hold the natural world together. The role of keystone species: sea otters help kelp forests flourish, supporting everything from salmon to eagles; wolves enable rivers to run clear and help forests thrive; and the humble wildebeest controls the numbers of trees, butterflies, elephants, and even giraffes on the savanna. Unfortunately, these deep connections also work in reverse. When keystones are removed, ecosystems unravel and collapse. With new knowledge, new hope. The remarkable resilience of nature is revealed, along with how the rules can be used to upgrade and restore the natural world. Note: Based on the book The Serengeti Rules by Dr. Sean B. Carroll.
583	3	"Undercover in the Jungle"	October 16, 2019	3703
584	4	"Okavango: River of Dreams – Paradise"	October 23, 2019	3704
585	5	"Okavango: River of Dreams – Limbo"	October 30, 2019	3705
586	6	"Okavango: River of Dreams: Inferno"	November 6, 2019	3706
587	7	"Nature's Biggest Beasts"	November 13, 2019	3707
588	8	"Bears"	November 20, 2019	3708
589	9	"The Whale Detective"	January 8, 2020	3709
590	10	"Hippos: Africa's River Giants"	January 15, 2020	3710
591	11	"Wild Florida"	February 12, 2020	3711
592	12	"The Mighty Weasel"	February 19, 2020	3712
593	13	"Cuba's Wild Revolution"	April 1, 2020	3713
594	14	"Remarkable Rabbits"	April 8, 2020	3714
595	15	"Spy in the Wild 2: The Tropics"	April 29, 2020	3715
596	16	"Spy in the Wild 2: The North"	May 6, 2020	3716
597	17	"Spy in the Wild 2: The Islands"	May 13, 2020	3717
598	18	"Spy in the Wild 2: The Poles"	May 20, 2020	3718

=== Season 39 (2020–21) ===
No. overall	No. in season	Title	Original release date	Prod. code
599	1	"Pandas: Born to be Wild"	October 21, 2020	3801
600	2	"Australian Bushfire Rescue"	October 28, 2020	3802
601	3	"Secrets of Survival | Primates"	November 4, 2020	3803
602	4	"Family Matters | Primates"	November 11, 2020	3804
603	5	"Protecting Primates | Primates"	November 18, 2020	3805
604	6	"Santa's Wild Home"	November 25, 2020	3806
605	7	"The Alps: The High Life"	January 13, 2021	3901
606	8	"The Alps: Winter's Fortress"	January 20, 2021	3902
607	9	"Pumas: Legends of the Ice Mountains"	February 3, 2021	3903
608	10	"Big Bend: The Wild Frontier of Texas"	February 10, 2021	3904
609	11	"The Leopard Legacy"	April 14, 2021	TBA
A leopardess, living along Zambia's Luangwa river lives and defends her young and territory.
610	12	"Sharks of Hawaii"	April 21, 2021	TBA
Examines close to 40 species of shark living in the volcano-heated waters of Hawaii.
611	13	"The Bat Man of Mexico"	June 30, 2021	TBA

=== Season 40 (2021–22) ===
No. overall	No. in season	Title	Original release date	Prod. code
612	1	"My Garden of a Thousand Bees"	October 20, 2021	TBA
Wildlife filmmaker Martin Dohrn gets to know the bees in his garden in Bristol, England, during the coronavirus lockdown.
613	2	"Season of the Osprey"	October 27, 2021	4002
An experienced pair of osprey raise a family at the mouth of the Connecticut River.
614	3	"The Elephant and the Termite"	November 3, 2021	TBA
See two very different animals create an African waterhole.
615	4	"First Steps | Born in the Rockies"	November 10, 2021	TBA
Animal mothers raise their young during spring and summer in the Rocky Mountains.
616	5	"Growing Up | Born in the Rockies"	November 17, 2021	TBA
Young animals learn to survive the winter in the Rocky Mountains.
617	6	"Oceans | Animals with Cameras"	January 19, 2022	TBA
618	7	"Australia | Animals with Cameras"	January 26, 2022	TBA
619	8	"Penguins: Meet the Family"	February 9, 2022	4006
620	9	"The Ocean's Greatest Feast"	February 16, 2022	4007
621	10	"American Horses"	February 23, 2022	4008
622	11	"Hippo King"	April 6, 2022	TBA
623	12	"American Arctic"	April 13, 2022	4010
624	13	"Portugal: Wild Land on the Edge"	April 27, 2022	TBA

=== Season 41 (2022–23) ===
No. overall	No. in season	Title	Original release date	Prod. code
625	1	"Running with the Beest"	October 19, 2022	4101
626	2	"Canada: Surviving the Wild North"	October 26, 2022	4102
627	3	"Woodpeckers: The Hole Story"	November 2, 2022	4103
628	4	"American Ocelot"	November 9, 2022	4104
629	5	"Wildheart"	January 18, 2023	4105
630	6	"Soul of the Ocean"	January 25, 2023	4106
631	7	"Dogs in the Wild: Meet the Family"	February 8, 2023	4107
632	8	"Dogs in the Wild: Secrets of Success"	February 15, 2023	4108
633	9	"Dogs in the Wild: Defending Wild"	February 22, 2023	4109
634	10	"The Hummingbird Effect"	April 12, 2023	4110
"Pura Vida" – Costa Rica's motto. The hummingbird effect brings flowers and fruit enjoyed by all. Fifty-plus species are key architects. Eastern black-crested coquettes stare-down mid-air over nectar-rich verbena. Sharply-angled heliconia ramonensis blossoms block green-crowned brilliants and green hermits from nectar, but white-tipped sicklebills fit. Rainforests host rare species; tamandua, tapir, reptiles, jaguars, pumas, 10,000 insects, and 16 hummingbird species keep Osa Peninsula in flower, sharing skies with 400 tropical birds, parrots and scarlet macaws. Howler and spider monkeys eat guava, passion fruit and figs. Crowned woodnymphs clean feathers in streams. Long-billed hermits gather at leks. Slowed down, chirps are entire songs. Fiery-throated hummingbirds dominate freezing Talamanca mountains. Talamanca hummingbirds have longer wings for thin air. Thumb-sized volcano hummingbirds exist nowhere else. Moms weave nests from plant fibers, moss, webs. Coppery-headed emeralds camouflage with lichen. Sicklebills use hanging palms near waterfalls. Rufous tails perch high. Baby mountaingems and blue-throated goldentail test wings. Only central highland cloud forests hosts two-inch snowcaps. White-necked Jacobin boys brawl, 1-of-5 females fake; "deceptive coloration." Long-tailed manakins flaunt finery; legendary quetzals take the prize. Rare mangrove hummingbirds tend mangrove and inga flowers; white-faced capuchins feast. Hummingbirds bring color, food, and life to the crossroads of the Americas.
635	11	"Niagara Falls"	April 19, 2023	4111
Straddling Canada and the U.S., Niagara Falls is the world's most famous waterfall. Three-thousand tons of water per second, plunging 180 feet, this geological wonder is central to Earth's largest freshwater system. Ring-billed gulls depend upon Niagara Escarpment, a thousand mile-long cliff stretching through Canada to Wisconsin, encompassing Lakes Erie, Huron, and Michigan. Scientific illustrator Jenna McGuire describes the ecosystem preserved in stone. Sam Skelton dives Bruce Peninsula's watery depths. Aquatic ecologist Marcus Rosten describes Niagara River's vast ecosystem. Water shrews dive for crayfish and dragonfly nymphs. With 90% lost to development, marshland animals are threatened. Only 1-in-1,400 snapping turtle eggs survives to adulthood. Parks biologist Ron Gould guards Ontario's oldest living white cedars; #811 is 1,322 years-old, germinated in 701 AD. Autumnal rains swell streams. Niagara Whirlpool swirls. Beavers prepare for winter; river otters play. Bonaparte's gulls from Arctic National Wildlife Refuge migrate, eating emerald shiners with common terns. A polar vortex freezes Lake Huron; snowy owls hunt. Winter storms generate 25-foot waves. Six-thousand shipwrecks litter the Great Lakes. Mariners nicknamed one area, the Graveyard of the Great Lakes. Sam and his brother surf "the absolute worst weather possible" while the Winter Festival of Lights celebrates a new year.
636	12	"Treasure of the Caribbean"	April 26, 2023	4112
F. Murray Abraham narrates this "discovery of a whole new world" – 2013: The Caribbean Sea reveals an underwater mountaintop crowned with a vast, pristine coral reef above the Cayman Trench. It's dubbed the Cayman Crown, part of the Mesoamerican Reef. Director of the Healthy Reefs for Healthy People Initiative, Dr. Melanie McField, and coordinator Ana Giró Petersen describe the discovery, protection efforts, and scientific research to save other endangered reefs. They inventory reef life, monitor health, and place temperature sensors. Major concern; bleaching events. Coral expert Myles Phillips of the Marine Wildlife Conservation Society investigates. 2008: Global menace, lionfish are seen. 2020: Guatemala and Belize grant the Crown conservation status. Protection relies on fishermen. Fisheries expert marine scientist Dr. Will Heyman is consulted. The most prized, are critically endangered Nassau groupers. Protecting breeding grounds becomes a priority. Marine biologist Dr. Michelle Schärer studies fish acoustics. She records grouper sounds at Glover's Reef to predict spawning and attract groupers to the Crown. Recovery depends on staunch enforcement of fishing bans. Strict protection of groupers in the Cayman Islands tripled populations. Discovering the Crown sparked hope that embattled Caribbean coral reefs may not be doomed. The team's success provides encouragement to continue.
637	13	"Attenborough's Wonder of Song"	May 3, 2023	4113
Sir David Attenborough reviews animal sounds he recorded and, using a spectrograph, discusses potential messages they may send. "Birds live on a different timescale...take recorded sound...turn it into a visual picture...to analyze that sound and reveal its full complexity." He's helped by experts: Prof. Lord John Krebs, University of Oxford; Dr. Conny Landraf, Leibniz Institute for Zoo and Wildlife Research; Dr. Anastasia Dalziell, University of Wollongong; Scientist Victoria Austing, Western Sydney University; Prof. Naomi Langmore, Australian National University; and Biologist Dr. Roger Payne, Ocean Alliance.

=== Season 42 (2023–24) ===
No. overall	No. in season	Title	Original release date
638	1	"The Platypus Guardian"	October 18, 2023
Naturalist Peter Walsh reconnects with life after facing the realization his time may become limited by brain lesions. Walsh is drawn to a rivulet in Hobart, the capital city of Tasmanian, where he befriends a female platypus he names Zoom. Over a one year period he follows and documents Zoom, along with a male he names Scoot, as they face dangers from the surrounding urban hazards; rubbish, runoff, industrial pollution, construction, and Autumnal flash floods. In a quest to learn more, Walsh reaches out to scientists and filmmakers, such as Australian wildlife biologist Dr. Chadden Hunter. Wildlife veterinarian Dr. Luke Gregory, in conjunction with the International Fund for Animal Welfare, works to rehabilitate and save another injured female platypus at Bonorong Wildlife Sanctuary. Before long, Zoom becomes famous and citizens in the local community react and respond to the threats against the platypus population, as they retake ownership and care of their neighborhood waterway. Platypus diet, behavior, and breeding is also examined, and against the odds, new life emerges as Zoom becomes a mother.
639	2	"Spy in the Ocean: Deep Thinkers"	October 25, 2023
In this 4-part series, innovative undersea "spy creature" robots explore alien realms in the world's oceans, revealing secrets and the mysteries of the deep. Part 1 of 4: Spies examine the social intelligence of marine life. In rare footage, a three-meter autonomous submersible disguised as a newborn joins a sperm whale family, arousing curiosity from a mother and calf. In Indonesian coral reefs, spy-octopus befriends a coconut octopus, helping it evade blacktip reef sharks, catch crabs, and defeat a rival. Spy-macaque observes Thailand macaques on a remote island catching fish, cracking shellfish using rocks, and diving for fun from trees. In the Sea of Japan, spy-puffer observes male pufferfish sand-sculpture artistry that attracts females. Spy-lion observes mackerel swarms tested against group thinking by marlins, sea lions, frigatebirds and a Bryde's whale. In Belize, hermit crabs organize to up-size their accommodations. Spy-piglet socializes with clever minds on a tiny Caribbean island in The Bahamas; wild pigs swim out to tourist boats, supplementing a diet of crabs and berries. Spy-crab investigates saddleback clownfish surviving apart from protective reefs, using carpet anemones, with help from spy-octopus. Note: A John Downer Production for the BBC, PBS and the WNET Group.
640	3	"Spy in the Ocean: Deep Feelings"	November 1, 2023
Part 2 of 4: Spy-dolphin films surfing dolphins to prove what they're feeling, before joining spy-humpback in French Polynesia to play with a two month-old humpback whale calf and observe deep emotion when its mother returns. Off the Australian coast, giant cuttlefish mood-changes display on their skin. A sophisticated spy-doppelgänger attracts a male by first mimicking a rival male, then an interested female; the cuttlefish drives off rivals. A mimic octopus changes color, matching sand texture and seagrass movement, fooling enemies. Fifteen impersonations include poisonous flatfish, lionfish and sea snakes, plus one; spy-octopus. Three month-old New Zealand fur seal pups play with spy-seal as a lonely pup's mother hunts. Pounding surf turns fun to fear. Spy-albatross searches for him struggling up a rocky mountain stream. Spy-seal encourages the dispirited pup, playing with a leaf, then a stick at the waterfall lagoon. After feeding near Caribbean coral reefs, manatees gather to socialize; spy-manatee joins in. Spy-mudskipper captures great blue spotted mudskippers courting on Japan's tidal mudflats. Spy-turtle looks close at olive ridley sea turtles, traveling thousands of miles to mate near Costa Rica. Bottlenose dolphins arrive to cuddle, and a mother nurtures her new-born.
641	4	"Spy in the Ocean: Deep Relationships"	November 8, 2023
Part 3 of 4: Extraordinary relationships are revealed. An Australian full moon rouses spider crabs to shed shells. Spy-crab and shelled crabs form mounds, protecting un-shelled comrades from sting rays. Hundreds of scalloped hammerheads travel to Malpelo Island, a magnetic anomaly off Colombia's coast. King angelfish and rainbow chub groom hammerhead and Galapagos shark skin; pilot fish clean teeth. Spy-moray studies moray eel and leather bass grouper alliances, hunting fish within coral. Spy-pelican and spy-dolphin follows bottlenose dolphins playing with southern right whales, and a rare humpback dolphin. Manatee indulge remora, eating parasites and dead skin; sergeant major fish remove algae. Nurse sharks detect spy-manatee's electronics. Indonesian bluestreak cleaner wrasse inspect spy-hammerhead's teeth; trevally fish lead olive sea snakes to prey. Spy-dolphin and spy-frigate records spinner dolphins amassing a thousands-strong mega-pod with yellowfin tuna and frigatebirds hunting a shoal of flying fish. Off Mexico's coast, spy-tuna-crab films a rare rising; millions of grimothea planipes eating plankton. Caribbean Autumnal storms prompt spiny lobster migration. Spy-lobster marches along; spy-nautilus finds their shipwreck refuge. Spy-iguana and Galápagos Islands marine iguanas dive for algae. A Galápagos sea lion plays. Angelfish and hogfish groom Mola mola sunfish. Damselfish remove sea urchins from their algae garden.
642	5	"Spy in the Ocean: Deep Trouble"	November 15, 2023
Part 4 of 4: Trouble lies beneath. In French Polynesia, dolphin, humpback, and frigate spies an unintentionally endangered newborn humpback calf that can't keep quiet when males sing to mate with its mother. On South Georgia, boulder-cam films Atlantic elephant seal pups, troubled by four-ton fighting bulls, rival mothers, and skua birds. Sand plums reveal to spy-crab a peacock mantis shrimp hunting for his egg-laden mate. Orcas kill companions of a lone, one-eyed Galápagos sea lion who hunts tuna near Galapagos sharks; frigate and sea lion spies observe. Spy-fringhead provokes an aggressive sarcastic fringehead guarding his California coastal home. Spy-hermit films a naked hermit crab, vulnerable to ruddy turnstone. Spy-herring hears millions of Pacific herring shoal-spawning in American seagrass and kelp. Spy-bald-eagle captures sea lions attacking; surf scoters eat eggs. Spies film New Zealand fur seal attacking cuttlefish; subterfuge includes camouflage, ink, jet propulsion, and mimicry. Spy-puffer follows jellyfish through hidden channels to an Indonesian lake; thousands eat plankton. Crab and pelican spies egg-laying grunion invading Mexican shores; pelicans feast. Sea-swelling weather troubles marine iguanas, including spy-iguana; sea lions surf. Indonesian swells hamper lionfish, coconut octopus, and even spy-octopus; green sea turtles chill. Spies everywhere illuminate mysteries of the deep.
643	6	"Big Little Journeys: Home"	January 10, 2024
In this special presentation of Nature, the latest camera technology follows six tiny animals on their biggest adventures. Part 1 of 3: A walnut-sized painted turtle hatchling navigates across busy Ontario Highway 60 at Algonquin Provincial Park in Canada, to reach Whitefish Lake within eight hours before the Autumnal frost kills her, while avoiding predators like red foxes, ravens, black bears, and racoon. She avoids a moose and the lake's top predator, a snapping turtle, and takes her last breath before diving to the bottom to hibernate for five months. A ten month-old Mohol bushbaby is driven out of his South African acacia hollow to find his own new home territory before starving or being eaten by genets and domestic dogs. He finds lodging already occupied by Southern yellow-billed hornbill and rival male bushbabies, after leaping six miles to a safari lodge. It's another five miles to the huge capital city of Pretoria, with rope "highways" installed by the suburban community. Accepted into a friendly city-wise tribe of bushbabies, they raid nectar from pristine white bird of paradise flowers at Pretoria Zoo; fifteen miles in all. Given a chance by humans, wildlife can thrive, even in urban settings.
644	7	"Big Little Journeys: Survival"	January 17, 2024
Part 2 of 3: The greatest adventures are the smallest. Taiwan's endangered pineapple-sized Formosan pangolin emerges to mate. Food first; 80,000 black ants per day. Hard scales ward against Taiwanese cobra, to climb trees for cocktail ants. After monoculture bamboo plantations, a female's burrow houses gem-faced civet. Fireflies light his nocturnal journey to olive groves with feral dogs. Taoist shrines lead to protected forests, termites, and carnivorous moon bear. Scent alerts him to a female; journey's end. In Brazil's Atlantic forest, endangered golden-headed lion tamarin parents travel to feed palm-sized, two month-old boy/girl twins, and three boys nearly two years old. At ten inches tall, milk bottle-sized, they sprint and spring the canopy at 25 MPH. Black-necked aracari reveal figs, but it's rival territory. Storms reduce temperature fifty degrees, risking hypothermia. A huge tree provides grubs, grasshoppers and frogs, but an ocelot forces them out of his three-mile territory. After five days, a road exposes them to attack. Mother bounds sixteen feet to safety as a harpy eagle snatches a sloth. Another mile dead-ends at farmland. Traveling the forest edge, Wied's marmosets spot an agouti, leading everyone to a cabruca sanctuary with cocoa pods, bananas and jackfruit, ensuring survival.
645	8	"Big Little Journeys: Bloodlines"	January 24, 2024
Part 3 of 3: A minutes-old, half-matchstick-sized Madagascan chameleon, with only a five-month lifespan, emerges in Kirindy Forest to perpetuating her bloodline. She climbs trees, eating 100 flies per day. Awoken by a cat-eyed tree snake she drops from her branch. Dawn harshly reveals forest is now farmland; she backtracks. Red-fronted lemurs shake her neem tree. Its fruit draws flies. Four months bring kaleidoscope-colored, finger-sized adulthood; a crimson spot draws two males battling for her. She mimics a wind-blown leaf to fool an egg-eating giant hognose snake. Her eggs buried, she dies; life's journey complete. In the Cairngorms, a palm-sized, three month-old Scottish water vole is driven two miles from home by an invasive American mink. Another female fights to the death to protect her own burrow. Three miles further, she swims a loch containing giant pike. Six-hundred feet up a rocky stream, a golden eagle threatens. Five miles from home, she climbs 2,000 feet, spying new territory. Depleted of minerals, she eats red deer antler for calcium. A juvenile adder presents no threat. The valley floor reveals a suitable burrow. A game of chase tests male stamina. Leading him home, her journey ends eight miles from her birthplace.
646	9	"Gorilla"	January 31, 2024
Primatologist Martha Robbins supervises Max Planck Institute scientists conducting long-term studies of Western lowland gorillas in Gabon's Loango National Park. They are assisted by local trackers, men from the Babongo people living at a base camp outpost in Waka. The silverback Kamaya leads a family consisting of Mokebo and her newborn, Ambia and her one year-old Malumbi, and young males Owegely and Waka, age six and ten respectively. Scientists must travel through mangroves to reach the family, which they named the Atananga group. Robbins describes how lowland gorillas differ from those in the Virunga Mountains. Other park wildlife include herds of African forest buffalo grazing the savanna, red river hogs, red-capped Mangabeys, and African forest elephants which rely on the rain forest. They examine diet, movement, social interactions, and threats to their habitat such as hunting, receding forests, and plastic trash collecting on the beaches. Tracker Emile Mapalo elaborates on villager-elephant relations. Waka trackers finally name the newborn Etshutshuku ("The Surprise") and celebrate in song.
647	10	"Flyways"	February 7, 2024
With GPS, scientists map epic journeys of shorebirds from three continents. Migratory flyways are subjected to landscape changed by development, drought, and rising seas. Biologist Richard Fuller and Dr. Micha Jackson study Far Eastern curlew migrating 7,000+ miles from Australia to Northern China. Dutch ecologist Dr. Jan Van Gils studies red knots migrating 6,000 miles from Banc d'Arguin National Park in Mauritania to Siberia. Environmental conservation Phd. Jennifer Linscott studies Hudsonian godwits migrating 9,000 miles to Beluga River bogs in Alaska from Chiloé Island in Chile. Issues include navigation, resting, and hydration. Godwits bypass drought in Texas for South Dakota wetlands. Red knots refuel on German Wadden Sea mud flats. War in Ukraine precludes traveling to Siberia; Jan studies populations in Nome, Alaska with infrared drones. Curlews cross the Great Barrier Reef and the Philippines to land in Taiwan; veterinarian Li Zheng-Feng photographs one tagged AAD. Dr. Nathan Senner examines Alaskan godwit hatchlings. Southern migration is hindered by hunters and weather. AAD stops at Rudong County mudflats outside Shanghai, where seawalls replaced shoreline. Jing Li campaigns to conserve feeding grounds. Godwits fly south to South Dakota farms and trash-filled Panama shores. A typhoon blows AAD to Borneo, before returning on-course.
648	11	"Attenborough and the Jurassic Sea Monster"	February 14, 2024
On England's southern "Jurassic Coast" at Kimmeridge Bay, Sir David Attenborough presents fossil experts excavating a pliosaur. Discovered by Philip Jacobs, and confirmed by Dr. Steve Etches, it's possibly the largest Jurassic oceanic predator. Chris Moore helps with the dig. Attenborough examines the pliosaur snout at Etches Collection Museum, which Steve founded. At the University of Southampton, CT scanners delve deeper. Paleobiologist Dr. Neil Gostling discovers sensory pits. Local farmer, Robert Vernicom devises a crate to haul the 6.5-foot, half-ton skull to the cliff top. Steve then removes rocks to reveal the skull. Paleontologist Dr. Judyth Sassoon, who studied plioraurs for decades, describes more from the location of its eyes and its parietal "third" eye. It may be a newly discovered species from eight already recognized. Paleobiologist Dr. Andre Rowe, a 3D visualization expert, scans the skull. From pterygoid muscle estimates, its total length may be 40 feet. From Andre's model, world-renowned paleontologist Prof. Emily Rayfield, specialized in skeletal mechanics, assesses bite-force at 32,000 newtons. Dr. Luke Muscutt at Imperial College London studies locomotion. Using robotics at the hydrodynamic laboratory, estimated acceleration is up to 30 MPH. Finally, CGI animation reveals how the pliosaur may have hunted ichthyosaurs.
649	12	"Patrick and the Whale"	February 21, 2024
Off the coast of Dominica, cinematographer Patrick Dykstra responds to clicks from a sperm whale by knocking his camera housing, which elicits an immediate, positive response from the whale, who he then names Dolores. A tragic event unfolds on the English Yorkshire Coast when ten juvenile sperm whales strand themselves, begging the question, "Why?" Patrick sets out to learn more by placing a camera below the jaw. It's a deadly risk with an unknown whale, so he tries to find Dolores again. A loud clang mimics a male's call, drawing her in. But she's now with a male, precluding the attempt. He tries again with Can Opener from Unit U, who now has her own calf named Hope. Underwater cinematographer Gail Jenkinson films Patrick's endeavor. Later when the camera eventually falls off, as planned, they locate and retrieve it to discover what the footage captured during a deep dive to hunt squid. Patrick continues with other means to get closer to the whales to uncover and understand their world.
650	13	"Raptors: A Fistful of Daggers – Meet the Raptors"	April 10, 2024
This series reveals what makes birds of prey the most successful hunters. Part 1 of 2: A 10-pound African crowned eagle with a 6-foot wingspan is the most powerful raptor, snatching vervet monkeys from trees, and taking down 60-pound antelope. In Borneo, soda can-sized black-thighed falconets have high hit rates against birds and insects. At 50-below, Finland's golden eagles compete for fox. Treeless South Dakota Badlands force burrowing owls underground. Bison and coyote dung attracts insects for food. Norway's sparrowhawks need five small birds a day to survive winter. Hundreds of thousands of Amur falcons migrate 2,000 miles from Siberia to Nagaland, India for winged termites before flying to Southern Africa. Goshawks navigate crowded forests at 30 MPH. Arctic gyrfalcons are fastest in open terrain level flight; nearly 70 MPH. Great grey owls pinpoint noise day or night, catching unseen voles under boreal forest snow. Using the sharpest vertebrate vision, a golden eagle's 150 MPH dive decimates a mountain goat. Turkey vultures, flying 200 miles a day, smell carrion a mile off. One barn owl family eats over 7,000 rodents a year. South American red-legged seriema disorients grassland snakes with his wings. It's only half the story....
651	14	"Raptors: A Fistful of Daggers – Extreme Lives"	April 17, 2024
Part 2 of 2: Raptors have extreme lives; intelligent castaways, long-distant travelers, resourceful parents, determined survivors. At minus-60, high Arctic, thickly feathered, extremely nomadic snowy owls eat forty (human equivalent) pounds a day, flying thousands of miles on 5-foot wingspans. Taiwan's Oriental honey buzzards are undeterred by extreme killers; Asian giant hornet larvae are irresistible. Extremely adapted secretarybirds are raptors on stilts, walking twenty miles a day on African savannas. Falkland Islands castaways form striated caracara youth gangs, rivaling adults for gentoo penguin carcasses. The ultimate nocturnal hunter, tawny owls fly in moonless total darkness; extreme spatial memory! African omnivorous gymnogene climb, reaching otherwise inaccessible prey with double-jointed ankles. Swainson's hawks, peregrine falcons, and red-tailed hawks exploit twenty-million Mexican free-tailed bats swarming from Bracken Cave, Texas, swallowing in-flight at over 60 MPH. Two Russian species form extreme relationships, eating bycatch from Japanese pollock fishermen; 3-foot-tall, 20-pound Steller's sea eagles and white-tailed eagles with 8-foot wingspans attract flocks of tourists. In central Florida wetlands, snail kites adapted extremely to eat an invasive snail species. Durban South Africa is a city full of vervet monkeys and rock hyrax for African crowned eagle chicks nesting in backyards.
652	15	"Grizzly 399: Queen of the Tetons"	May 8, 2024
May 2020: Crowds cause a "bear-jam" at Pilgrim Creek, Wyoming to see Grizzly 399, "the queen in Grand Teton National Park" (GTNP). Conservationist Thomas D. Mangelsen photographed "Research #399" for fifteen years. He and others comment on how her fame has complicated her duty as mother to protect and raise her four cubs. GTNP bear biologist Justin Schwabedissen estimates 45% of cubs die. Ecologist Trevor Bloom explains, male grizzlies are #1 killers. Males avoid people and traffic, explaining why 399 stays nearby, which bear biologist Dr. Chris Servheen describes as habituation, raising the possibility of euthanasia, despite being listed in 1975 on the Endangered Species Act. 2021: Cubs enter Jackson Hole private property, on porches, raiding beehives, and stride down Jackson streets, caught on police station CCTV. In Cora, 108 miles from GTNP, rancher Mike Vickrey estimates 10-12 cattle were killed by grizzlies. Rancher Kent Price advocates endangerment delisting, and state-managed grizzly hunting seasons. WyoFile environmental reporter Angus Thuermer Jr. and Servheen acknowledge that 399 mauled someone in 2007; Dennis Van Denbos tells his story. Wyoming, Montana, and Idaho petitioned to delist grizzlies, but conservationists argue insufficient gene flow between GTNP, Bob Marshall Wilderness and Glacier National Park. In Hoback, 399's cubs, #1057 and #1058 are captured due to conflicts. Bloom worries that climate change causes chokeberries, serviceberries, and buffaloberries to fruit earlier, causing scarcity of Fall food required for hibernation. 2022: Yellowstone Grizzly Bear Conflict Report (2021), "128 conflicts, 2 injuries, 1 fatality." Her cubs nearly full grown, 399 chased them off that summer. Cora residents Steve and Patsy Gratzfeld spot 1057 on their property. In total, 13 reported conflicts with 1057. Thuermer describes the difference between habituation and food-conditioned, noting the latter is not tolerated. As a result, Wyoming Game and Fish Department captured and euthanized 1057 on 7/12/22. Although tragic, Mangelsen concludes, "[399] changed people's attitude towards grizzly bears... she will likely save bears from being delisted and killed." Spring 2023: At 27 years old, 399 emerged with a single new cub. "She's just one special bear." Note: Nominated for an Emmy Award for Outstanding Nature Documentary.
653	16	"Saving the Animals of Ukraine"	May 15, 2024
Ukraine war effects on animals are exposed and go viral. Poplova explains rescuing big cats who developed PTSD from constant bombardment. Col. Mykhailo Iliev, Chernihiv Emergency Services, explains training his dog Patron to find mines and unexploded ordnance. ZooPatrol founder Dmitry Revnkuk saves pets from abandoned homes. Russian attacks on the airport near Hostomel animal shelter impacts 800 dogs and 100 cats. Borodyanka's state-run shelter staff fled, leaving 485 dogs for 45 days; 222 died from starvation. Kate Parunova noticed an animal stranded 7 stories up, surviving 60 days without food or water. ZooPatrol enlists the Ministry of Emergency Services; Shafa the Cat became a symbol of strength and perseverance. Ukrainian scientist Ivan Rusev addresses impacts on 256 migratory bird species within Tuzlovski Lymany National Nature Park. Oceanic impacts include beached dolphins; some 5,000 found dead from warship sonar. Romanian, Bulgarian and Turkish scientists test for cause of death, and contact the War crimes Investigation Unit. Bioethicist Kerry Bowman suggests war crimes include environmental crimes of suffering and death of all species and biospheres. Psychologist Dr. Anastasya Markotan and Volodymyr Vakhito, Phd. discuss animal therapy for PTSD. Beli Day discusses rehabilitation for Bretzel the Lion at Animal Advocacy and Protection, Spain.
654	17	"Wild Ireland: Kingdom of Stone"	May 22, 2024
The Burren; a limestone otherworld where only tiny critical scraps of woodland oases remain. Near Mullaghmore mountain a pine marten emerges; two kits revealed by camera, hidden inside their tree hollow. Basking sharks filter plankton. Mysteriously, scores gather and circle, but why? Masters of darkness and water, Daubenton's bats consume insects. Wildflowers like mountain avens and bloody crane's-bill encourage rich insect habitat, where camouflaged crab spiders ambush bees. The kits taste their first birds, rabbits, and mice. Non-native legless lizard slow worms, discovered only last century, are the closest thing to a snake in Ireland. Underground, cave mazes drain nearly all rain, only occasionally flooding the surface, creating turloughs; perfect for three-spined stickleback. Corcomroe Abbey's noisy jackdaws have new neighbors; a kestrel mum with hungry chicks. At six weeks, mum hauls bored kits out to freedom. Twenty-one kinds of butterflies fly the Aran Islands; Ireland's rarest, the marsh fritillary. Fin whales occasionally appear. At four months, the kits explore; mum leaves at the end of summer. Whooper swans migrate from Iceland in October, marking another year to the poet Yeats. Nature at its most perfect. The kits survive their first winter in this kingdom of stone.

=== Season 43 (2024–25) ===
No. overall	No. in season	Title	Original release date
655	1	"Silverback"	October 23, 2024
For three months, Kahuzi-Biéga National Park invites wildlife cameraman Vianet Djenguet, of the Republic of the Congo, to document an effort to prevent Eastern lowland gorilla extinction. With only 5,000 left, the goal is habituating the Mpungwe family (named after the silverback) so groups can safely visit, generating tourism income. Chief Guide, Papa Lambert Mongane explains before the war, 630 highland gorillas lived; now, 170. 1980s habituation helped when only 400 mountain gorillas remained. Virunga and Bwindi national parks followed suit; now, 1,000+ proves it works. Papa John Kahekwa describes the community and why habituation is so vital. Djenguet compares methods: 1) Dian Fossey's submissive approach; 2) Kahuzi-Biega founders' assertive theory to win Mpungwe's respect. Day 63: Kahuzi-Biega hosts tourists for their only habituated Bonane family. Pre-war, 7,000 tourists/year; today, 1,800. Reduced income doesn't sustain. Day 81: They discuss political instability. Pre-war they had 5 habituated families. Resuming war, gorillas would go extinct. Day 84: Djenguet has doubts. They discuss continuing or stopping. Mongane explains, they chose (35-year-old) Mpungwe because he was raised within an habituated family, but (9-years-old) saw his father killed during the war. "Stressed...he went wild." But soon, they are surrounded by Mpungwe's family.
656	2	"Dracula's Hidden Kingdom"	October 30, 2024
Jeremy Irons narrates – "Dracula was Bram Stoker's imagination... Transylvania is wild and wonderful." Carpathians winter ends. Beasts emerge and roam...hungry. Spring burst into life. Brown bears fight for females. White storks migrate 7,000 miles from Africa; male first, "boss" next. Tartar Hill explodes with summer wildflowers +200 butterfly species. Where bees, bee-eaters. Sanzien girls weave floral crowns; Fires ward off evil. Vlad Dracul's legend was at Bran Castle; his court, 40 miles south in Târgoviște. Churches, fortified like castles during religious wars, now house...bats! What else? Twenty-six different kinds, including greater mouse-eared bats. A century ago, only 54 European bison remained; 200 now roam. Opportunistic lynx stalk chamois. Hoopoe whoop; survival school shifts to surface. Mama-bear's baby-cubs are "just the right size" to play/fight. In Viscri, storks feed four fledglings...full-time! Giant 800 year-old oaks leave acorns for livestock. Stag beetles fight a full-on beetle battle for babes. Migration/reintroduction brings beavers back after 200 years. Autumn sees Transylvania's finest show; pressure mounts to create Făgăraș Mountains National Park, precluding loggers. Folks grow fruits; palincă plums benefit bears risking raids. Shy, elusive winter woods wolves are apex predators. Red fox pounce snow for snacks. Lynx are lone, except during winter mating.
657	3	"San Diego: America's Wildest City"	November 6, 2024
658	4	"Lions of the Skeleton Coast"	November 13, 2024
659	5	"Attenborough's Life Journey"	November 20, 2024
660	6	"Big Cats, Small World: Landlords"	January 22, 2025
661	7	"Big Cats, Small World: Outlanders"	January 29, 2025
662	8	"Expedition Killer Whale"	February 12, 2025
663	9	"Museum Alive with David Attenborough"	February 19, 2025
664	10	"Sanctuary | Katavi: Africa's Fallen Paradise"	April 2, 2025
665	11	"Purgatory | Katavi: Africa's Fallen Paradise"	April 9, 2025
666	12	"Salvation | Katavi: Africa's Fallen Paradise"	April 16, 2025
667	13	"Hummingbirds of Hollywood"	May 7, 2025

=== Season 44 (2025–26) ===
No. overall	No. in season	Title	Original release date
668	1	"Walrus: Life on Thin Ice"	October 22, 2025
669	2	"WILLOW: Diary of a Mountain Lion"	October 29, 2025
670	3	"The Pigeon Hustle"	November 5, 2025
671	4	"Jaguar Beach"	November 12, 2025
672	5	"Tusker: Brotherhood of Elephants"	January 14, 2026
673	6	"Grasslands | Parenthood"	February 4, 2026
674	7	"Freshwater | Parenthood"	February 11, 2026
675	8	"Oceans | Parenthood"	February 18, 2026
676	9	"Jungles | Parenthood"	February 25, 2026
677	10	"The Greatest Adventure | Parenthood"	March 4, 2026
678	11	"Baby Steps | Becoming Elephant: The Orphans of Reteti"	April 8, 2026
679	12	"Graduation Day | Becoming Elephant: The Orphans of Reteti"	April 15, 2026
680	13	"Legendary Tigers of India"	April 22, 2026

=== Season 45 (2026–present) ===
No. overall	No. in season	Title	Original release date
681	1	"Sesame Street and the Great Elephant Adventure"	October 14, 2026
682	2	"Part 1 | Tiger Island"	October 21, 2026
683	3	"Part 2 | Tiger Island"	October 28, 2026
684	4	"HumanLike: The Chimps of Fongoli"	November 11, 2026
