= Spy in the Ocean =

2023 television documentary series

- Genre: Documentary
- Narrated by: David Tennant
- Original language: English
- No. of episodes: 4

Production
- Producer: John Downer
- Production company: John Downer Productions

Original release
- Network: BBC
- Release: 4 June 2023
- Network: PBS; WNET
- Release: October 25, 2023

Related
- Spy in the Wild; Nature (PBS)

Spy in the Ocean is a 2023 BBC Television documentary series produced by John Downer for the BBC, PBS and The WNET Group. It films sea creatures in the wild using camera-equipped, marine life-shaped animatronic robots. It is a sequel to the earlier BBC series Spy in the Wild (2017, 2020).

== Production ==
The series is narrated by Scottish actor David Tennant, known for portraying the Tenth and Fourteenth Doctor in Doctor Who and Barty Crouch Jr. in Harry Potter and the Goblet of Fire (2005).

Film locations include Australia, Belize, California, British Columbia, Caribbean, Colombia, Costa Rica, French Polynesia, Galápagos Islands, Indonesia, Japan, Malpelo Island, Mauritius, Mexico, New Zealand, South Georgia, and Thailand.

In addition to cameras disguised as inanimate objects such as Boulder-Cam, "spy creature" animal robots utilized include:

- albatross
- bald eagle
- blue crab
- coconut octopus
- cuttlefish
- dolphin
- frigatebird
- fur seal
- ghost crab
- hammerhead shark
- hermit crab
- herring
- humpback whale
- lobster
- macaque
- manatee
- marine iguana
- moray eel
- mudskipper
- nautilus
- oyster
- pelican
- piglet
- pufferfish
- sarcastic fringehead
- sea lion
- sperm whale
- spider crab
- tuna crab
- turtle

== Releases ==
The series premiered 4 June 2023 in the United Kingdom on BBC.

In the United States, PBS rebroadcast the series for Season 42 of Nature beginning on October 25, 2023.

== Episodes ==
No.	Title	Original release date	PBS release date
1	"Spy in the Ocean: Deep Thinkers"	June 3, 2023	October 25, 2023
Innovative undersea "spy creature" robots explore alien realms in the world's oceans, revealing secrets and the mysteries of the deep. Spies examine the social intelligence of marine life. In rare footage, a three-meter autonomous submersible disguised as a newborn joins a sperm whale family, arousing curiosity from a mother and calf. In Indonesian coral reefs, spy-octopus befriends a coconut octopus, helping it evade blacktip reef sharks, catch crabs, and defeat a rival. Spy-macaque observes Thailand macaques on a remote island catching fish, cracking shellfish using rocks, and diving for fun from trees. In the Sea of Japan, spy-puffer observes male pufferfish sand-sculpture artistry that attracts females. Spy-sea-lion observes mackerel swarms tested against group thinking by marlins, sea lions, frigatebirds and a Bryde's whale. In Belize, hermit crabs organize to up-size their accommodations. Spy-piglet socializes with clever minds on a tiny Caribbean island in The Bahamas; wild pigs swim out to tourist boats, supplementing a diet of crabs and berries. Spy-crab investigates saddleback clownfish surviving apart from protective reefs, using carpet anemones, with help from spy-octopus.
2	"Spy in the Ocean: Deep Feelings"	TBA	November 1, 2023
Spy-dolphin films surfing dolphins to prove what they're feeling, before joining spy-humpback in French Polynesia to play with a two month-old humpback whale calf and observe deep emotion when its mother returns. Off the Australian coast, giant cuttlefish mood-changes display on their skin. A sophisticated spy-doppelgänger attracts a male by first mimicking a rival male, then an interested female; the cuttlefish drives off rivals. A mimic octopus changes color, matching sand texture and seagrass movement, fooling enemies. Fifteen impersonations include poisonous flatfish, lionfish and sea snakes, plus one; spy-octopus. Three month-old New Zealand fur seal pups play with spy-seal as a lonely pup's mother hunts. Pounding surf turns fun to fear. Spy-albatross searches for him struggling up a rocky mountain stream. Spy-seal encourages the dispirited pup, playing with a leaf, then a stick at the waterfall lagoon. After feeding near Caribbean coral reefs, manatees gather to socialize; spy-manatee joins in. Spy-mudskipper captures great blue spotted mudskippers courting on Japan's tidal mudflats. Spy-turtle looks close at olive ridley sea turtles, traveling thousands of miles to mate near Costa Rica. Bottlenose dolphins arrive to cuddle, and a mother nurtures her new-born.
3	"Spy in the Ocean: Deep Relationships"	TBA	November 8, 2023
Extraordinary relationships are revealed. An Australian full moon rouses spider crabs to shed shells. Spy-crab and shelled crabs form mounds, protecting un-shelled comrades from sting rays. Hundreds of scalloped hammerheads travel to Malpelo Island, a magnetic anomaly off Colombia's coast. King angelfish and rainbow chub groom hammerhead and Galapagos shark skin; pilot fish clean teeth. Spy-moray studies moray eel and leather bass grouper alliances, hunting fish within coral. Spy-pelican and spy-dolphin follows bottlenose dolphins playing with southern right whales, and a rare humpback dolphin. Manatee indulge remora, eating parasites and dead skin; sergeant major fish remove algae. Nurse sharks detect spy-manatee's electronics. Indonesian bluestreak cleaner wrasse inspect spy-hammerhead's teeth; trevally fish lead olive sea snakes to prey. Spy-dolphin and spy-frigate records spinner dolphins amassing a thousands-strong mega-pod with yellowfin tuna and frigatebirds hunting a shoal of flying fish. Off Mexico's coast, spy-tuna-crab films a rare rising; millions of grimothea planipes eating plankton. Caribbean Autumnal storms prompt spiny lobster migration. Spy-lobster marches along; spy-nautilus finds their shipwreck refuge. Spy-iguana and Galápagos Islands marine iguanas dive for algae. A Galápagos sea lion plays. Angelfish and hogfish groom Mola mola sunfish. Damselfish remove sea urchins from their algae garden.
4	"Spy in the Ocean: Deep Trouble"	TBA	November 15, 2023
Trouble lies beneath. In French Polynesia, dolphin, humpback, and frigate spies an unintentionally endangered newborn humpback calf that can't keep quiet when males sing to mate with its mother. On South Georgia, boulder-cam films Atlantic elephant seal pups, troubled by four-ton fighting bulls, rival mothers, and skua birds. Sand plumes reveal to spy-crab a peacock mantis shrimp hunting for his egg-laden mate. Orcas kill companions of a lone, one-eyed Galápagos sea lion who hunts tuna near Galapagos sharks; frigate and sea lion spies observe. Spy-fringhead provokes an aggressive sarcastic fringehead guarding his California coastal home. Spy-hermit films a naked hermit crab, vulnerable to ruddy turnstones. Spy-herring hears millions of Pacific herring shoal-spawning in American seagrass and kelp. Spy-bald-eagle captures sea lions attacking, Surf scoters eat eggs. Spies film New Zealand fur seals attacking cuttlefish; subterfuge includes camouflage, ink, jet propulsion, and mimicry. Spy-puffer follows jellyfish through hidden channels to an Indonesian lake; thousands eat plankton. Crab and pelican spies egg-laying grunion invading Mexican shores; pelicans feast. Sea-swelling weather troubles marine iguanas, including spy-iguana; sea lions surf. Indonesian swells hamper lionfish, coconut octopus, and even spy-octopus; green sea turtles chill. Spies everywhere illuminate mysteries of the deep.
