= Alejandro Rico-Guevara =

Evolutionary biologist and behavioral ecophysicist

- Born: February 9, 1981 (age 45)
- Education: Universidad Nacional de Colombia; University of Connecticut
- Employers: University of California, Berkeley; University of Washington (current)
- Website: http://www.alejorico.com/Home.html https://ecophysics.org/

Alejandro Rico-Guevara is an evolutionary biologist and behavioral ecophysicist. His scientific research has focused on nectar-feeding animals with an emphasis on hummingbird bill morphology and biomechanics. He is an assistant professor in the Biology Department at the University of Washington and Curator of Ornithology at the Burke Museum of Natural History and Culture.

== Education ==
Rico-Guevara attended Universidad Nacional de Colombia for his undergraduate work and received his Ph.D. from the University of Connecticut as a Fulbright Scholarship recipient. He then held a postdoctoral position at the University of California, Berkeley as a Miller Research Fellow. He is currently an assistant professor at the University of Washington and Curator of Ornithology for the Burke Museum of Natural History and Culture. He received the Walt Halperin Professor of Biology award and is a Washington Research Foundation Distinguished Investigator.

Rico-Guevara has been interviewed for radio and television and his research has appeared in the New York Times, National Geographic Magazine, NPR Forbes, and TED-Ed. His work has also been featured in several documentary series such as PBS Nature’s "Super Hummingbirds".

== Research ==
He leads the Behavioral Ecophysics lab focusing on mechanistic approaches to explain how animals function and evolve. He does this using interdisciplinary methods, incorporating study of physiology, movements, and signals (e.g. color and sound), while establishing explicit links to selective pressures from their biotic and abiotic environments. His work focuses on nectar feeding biomechanics, linking mechanisms to behavior and ecology, and intrasexually selected weapons.

=== Intrasexually selected weapons ===
In collaboration with Kristiina Hurme, Rico-Guevara has been investigating the trade-off between feeding efficiency and the use of bills as weapons. Previous literature has suggested that sexual differences in bill morphology is likely due to differences in foraging patterns. Rico-Guevara proposes that these morphological bill differences are likely an evolutionarily result of the need for weapons in the fight for male-male dominance. This work has been conducted in conjunction with Marcelo Araya-Salas. Their collaborative research has been published in both Behavioral Ecology and Biological Reviews

=== Nectar feeding biomechanics ===
The work Rico-Guevara is likely most known for his work investigating the biomechanics of nectar feeding. Previous research has suggested that hummingbirds obtain their nectar via capillary action, and many pieces of literature are based upon that understanding. Rico-Guevara, in collaboration with Margaret Rubega, commented on the capillarity model and suggested that the tongue acts as a fluid trap.

== Core-Code work ==
In addition to his research, Rico-Guevara leads his lab in what has been named “CORE-CODE”, an acronym for COmmunicating student science and experiences, REcruiting students (underrepresented groups in science), COnnections (e.g. students – researchers / local communities) and DEvelopment of students (inside and beyond academia). This effort emphasizes the importance of diversifying academia and greatly influences the Behavioral Ecophysics Lab, as well as informs Rico-Guevara’s mentorship of students and staff.

== Science communication ==
In addition to his work as an ecophysicist, Rico-Guevara has focused his time on being a science communicator. He has written for the public with his collaborator, K. Hurme, in articles such as "Hummingbird tongues are tiny pumps that spring open to draw in nectar". He has contributed to TED Ed talks, such as "The Surprising Secrets of Hummingbird Flight". His paper 2015 paper in Proceedings B, "Hummingbird Tongues are Elastic Micropumps" was covered in articles for the broader public by Science Magazine News, Discover Magazine. and The Washington Post

== Awards and recognitions ==
- 2008 William Fulbright Fellowship
- 2016 Adolph C. and Mary Sprauge Miller Institute for Basic Research in Science Fellowship
- 2018 Frank A. Pitelka Award for Excellence in Research
- 2020 WRF Distinguished Investigator
- 2019 Walt Halperin Endowed Professor of Biology
- 2020 WRF Distinguished Investigator

== Selected publications ==
- The hummingbird tongue is a fluid trap, not a capillary tube
- Intrasexually selected weapons
- Bills as daggers? A test for sexually dimorphic weapons in a lekking hummingbird
- Hummingbird tongues are elastic micropumps

== See also ==
- Alien Worlds (2020 TV series)
- List of Nature episodes
