= Kerry Bowman =

Canadian academic

Kerry Bowman is a Canadian bioethicist and environmentalist based in Toronto, Ontario.

== Career ==
Bowman holds an academic appointment with The University of Toronto in Family and Community Medicine and serves with The University of Toronto's School of the Environment. He also works with patients, families and health care teams as a clinical bioethicist.

Bowman follows a range of bioethical issues, including end-of-life decision making, ethical questions in emerging technology, such as genomics, gene drive and CRISPR-Cas9, cloning and reproductive ethics. He is also concerned with a variety of animal and environmental ethical questions, particularly emerging zoonotic diseases, tropical forest loss and de-extinction.

Bowman's role as an ethicist informs the work he does as an environmentalist, which focuses primarily on the interface of human cultures with conservation initiatives. He is presently working on major projects in both Eastern Congo and the Western Amazon both involving indigenous and local communities establishing stewardship over their forests. Bowman has done extensive fieldwork with a range of species; including all four great ape species in both Indonesia and Central Africa. He has observed in their natural habitat the Sumatran rhinoceros (Aceh, Sumatra, Indonesia, 1981), the Bactrian camel (Gashun Gobi Desert, western China, 2012), the Javan rhino (Ujung Kulon National Park, Java, Indonesia, 2013), as well as all species of big cats, including the snow leopard (Hemis National Park, Ladakh region, India, 2015).

Bowman has worked with Jane Goodall Institute Global and is the founding president of the Forest Health Alliance (formerly called Canadian Great Ape Alliance). With the original goal of saving the great apes from extinction through a direct Congolese partnership, this organization operates and oversees projects in the Eastern Democratic Republic of Congo (DRC) that are designed to reflect local cultures, as well as economic and political realities. This includes the Great Ape Habitat Connectivity Project, which has been developing a habitat corridor for the eastern lowland gorilla and eastern chimpanzees to promote gene flow and reduce deforestation.

Bowman established the Kahuzi-Biega Environmental School in the Eastern Democratic Republic of Congo in 2003. The initiative was designed to give young students an opportunity to acquire a basic education as well as an understanding of their role in environmental and wildlife conservation. "There's absolutely no way of protecting the environment without working with local people and enriching and protecting human communities", Bowman told reporters at a 2011 press conference.

=== Media appearances and documentaries ===
As one of the University of Toronto’s Breaking News Experts, Bowman has done thousands of media interviews, both nationally and internationally on a range of topics in his areas of expertise, from artificial intelligence to zoonosis. He was frequently consulted on COVID-19-related matters during the pandemic. He has been interviewed about vaccine certificates.

Bowman has been featured in documentaries including Saving the Animals of Ukraine (2024) and The Corridor (2023). He also appeared in The Genetic Revolution (2018) and Gorilla Doctors (2014), both CBC The Nature of Things documentaries, and in a 2002 Discovery Channel documentary called Bushmeat, which traced the path of the illicit bushmeat trade from the Congo Basin to an underground meat market in Cameroon and beyond, and in The Ghosts of Lomako, a 2003 Nature of Things documentary in which Bowman traveled to the Democratic Republic of Congo to study the endangered bonobo ape.

=== United Nations ===
Bowman is currently working with Office for The Coordination of Humanitarian Affairs (OCHA) on an approach called Anticipatory Action, a set of actions taken to prevent or mitigate potential humanitarian disasters before acute impacts are felt. Through on-site fieldwork in fragile states, he is exploring both the ethics of this as well as many of the social, cultural and qualitative realities associated with such interventions.

Having spent time in Chad, Sudan and South Sudan in 2023 and 2024, Bowman reported his observations and warned of the risk of ignoring the unfolding crisis in that part of the world: "The volume of suffering, fear and deprivation I saw on the border of Chad and West Darfur was staggering."

Bowman previously served with United Nations Environment Programme (UNEP), as author with the fourth Global Environment Outlook (GEO-4) in 2007 and as a contributing author and expert reviewer with GEO-5 in 2012. He was also involved in Global Environment Outlook 6, examining the connection between human health and the environment.

=== North Korea ===
Since 2010, Bowman has joined a number of international delegations to North Korea (DPRK) that focused on environmental improvement and youth environmental education in relation to environmentally improved agricultural and environmental practice. "What is remarkable," Bowman notes, "is that DPRK may be the only country in the world that has adopted organic, sustainable agriculture as a national policy".

=== The Western Amazon ===
Bowman has recently turned his attention to the relationship between the protection of indigenous land and its environmental/climatic benefits, as well as the negative climatic impacts of environmental degradation in the Amazon rainforest. Says Bowman: "The Indigenous peoples of the Amazon and the world are one of our best hopes to protect our forests, secure biodiversity and slow the environmental calamity we are facing." This work has brought him into the range of some of the world's last remaining isolated and uncontacted indigenous communities. Although never seeking to make contact, he is one of the few Canadian researchers to have actually seen uncontacted people, and has spent time with indigenous groups of the western Amazon, including those only just recently contacted by the outside world. His work has included remote regions of Papua New Guinea, as well as into the eastern Congo's Ituri rainforest, where he cohabited among the Mbuti pygmies.
