= Nicholas Hooper =

- Also known as: Nick Hooper
- Born: 23 July 1952 (age 74)
- Genre: Film scores
- Occupation: Composer
- Instrument: Guitar
- Years active: 1985–present

Nicholas Hooper is a British film and television composer and guitarist. He has scored the award-winning BBC productions Land of the Tiger and Andes to Amazon, as well as the TV movies The Girl in the Café and My Family and Other Animals among others. Hooper won a BAFTA Award and an Ivor Novello Award for Original Score in 2004 for The Young Visiters and a BAFTA for Best Original Television Music in 2007 for Prime Suspect: The Final Act.

He studied at the Royal College of Music in the early 1970s where he scored his first films.

His highest-profile scores were for Harry Potter and the Order of the Phoenix and Harry Potter and the Half-Blood Prince, for which he reunited with old friend director David Yates, with whom he had worked before on The Tichborne Claimant, The Way We Live Now, State of Play, The Young Visiters and The Girl in the Café. These were Hooper's most notable works on blockbuster films. For Half-Blood Prince, he was nominated for a Grammy. However, he chose not to return for the final two installments, which were composed by French composer & conductor Alexandre Desplat.

Hooper then scored the soundtrack to the Disney documentary African Cats, which was chosen as one of the 97 original scores eligible for a nomination at the 84th Academy Awards in 2011.

Hooper is also a performing guitarist. He released a solo guitar album, 6 Strings, in 2015. The album features Irish folk music and was recorded at Abbey Road Studios in London. In 2018, he released the album Pete's Trees with his duo Henderson:Hooper. In 2019 he appeared on charity double CD Strings that Nimble Leap, produced by Fylde Guitars, alongside Graham Coxon and Chris Leslie. He performs regularly with Gordon Giltrap MBE and The Boot Band.

Hooper has also released three novels: Above the Void (2017) and books One and Two in the Arnold Rackham detective thriller series, The Occasional Gardener (2018) and The Mirror in the Ice Cream Parlour (2019). Book Three is due for release in 2020.

== Works ==
- Port Meadow (1985)
- The Road Ahead (1988)
- Wildabout (1989)
- National Geographic Series (1991)
- The Weaver's Wife (1991)
- Good Looks (1992)
- The Time Traveller (1993)
- Punch (1996)
- Land of the Tiger (1997)
- The Tichborne Claimant (1998)
- Elephants of the Sand River (1999)
- Andes to Amazon (2000)
- Timeless Thames (2000–2001)
- The Way We Live Now (2001) – BAFTA nomination
- The Secret (2002)
- The Heart of Me (2003)
- The Future is Wild (2003)
- Loving You (2003)
- DV8: The Cost of Living (2003)
- State of Play (2003) – BAFTA nomination
- The Young Visiters (2003) – BAFTA winner
- Tigers of the Emerald Forest (2003)
- Messiah III: The Promise (2004)
- Blue Murder (2004)
- Nature (1996–2005)
- Dad (2005)
- Bloodlines (2005)
- My Family and Other Animals (2005)
- The Girl in the Café (2005) – BAFTA nomination
- The Chatterley Affair (2006)
- Prime Suspect: The Final Act (2006) – BAFTA winner
- Harry Potter and the Order of the Phoenix (2007)
- Einstein and Eddington (2008)
- Harry Potter and the Half-Blood Prince (2009) – Grammy nomination
- Enid (2009)
- Yes, Virginia (2009)
- 10 Minute Tales (2009)
- Mo (2010)
- DCI Banks: Aftermath (2010)
- African Cats (2011)
- Stella Days (2011)
- Birdsong (BBC One Drama) (2012)
- Chimpanzee (2012)
- The Escape Artist (2013)
- Winter Thaw (2016)

== See also ==
- Harry Potter music
