= Patrick Dykstra =

Wildlife cinematographer

- Patrick Dykstra in 2025
- Born: Patrick Dystrka
- Occupation: Wildlife cinematographer

Patrick Dykstra is a wildlife cinematographer and researcher. His work has been featured in nature films and television series for media networks including the BBC, National Geographic, and PBS. Dykstra won a BAFTA for his cinematography of sperm whales on the BBC series Blue Planet II in 2017. He was the host of the Discovery Channel series Chasing Ocean Giants in 2021. In 2024, the film Patrick and the Whale featured Dykstra's close encounter with a sperm whale off the coast of Dominica.

== Early life and education ==
Dykstra grew up in Denver, Colorado and Keene, Kansas. He was inspired to swim with whales after seeing a model of a blue whale during a trip to the Smithsonian National Museum of Natural History when he was 16 years old. After graduating from Mission Valley High School in Harveyville, Kansas, he received a bachelor's degree from Florida State University and a law degree from New York University.

== Career ==
Dykstra worked as a corporate lawyer at Gibson Dunn & Crutcher and used his earnings to fund his whale photography hobby. After posting videos online of killer whales that he filmed while on vacation, the BBC purchased Dykstra's footage to include in a documentary series. In 2014 at the age of 32, Dykstra retired from law to focus on whale research and tours through his company, Picture Adventure Expeditions.

As a cinematographer, Dykstra has worked on nature films and television series for media networks including the BBC, National Geographic, and PBS. Snopes reported that Dykstra captured footage of blue whales nursing in 2015. In 2016, Dykstra captured footage of a 35,000 humpback whale nearly crashing into him in the Norwegian Sea. Dykstra conducted research with the Massachusetts Institute of Technology to learn about whale communication and behaviors.

On February 27, 2018, Dykstra captured what is believed to be the first aerial footage of rare Gervais's beaked whales off the west coast of Dominica. He was the host of the Discovery Channel series Chasing Ocean Giants in 2021. The 2024 film Patrick and the Whale featured Dykstra's close encounter with a sperm whale he'd named "Dolores" while diving off the coast of Dominica.

== Awards ==
Dykstra won a BAFTA for his cinematography of sperm whales on the BBC series Blue Planet II in 2017. The 2024 film that featured Dykstra, Patrick and the Whale, was nominated for an Emmy Award in 2025.
