= Deep Jungle =

- Starring: Paul Christie (narrator)
- Theme music composer: Will Slater
- Countries of origin: United Kingdom; United States
- Original language: English
- No. of episodes: 3

Production
- Producers: Granada Wild; Thirteen/WNET
- Running time: 156 minutes

Original release
- Network: PBS
- Release: April 17 – May 1, 2005

Deep Jungle is a three-part miniseries that originally aired on PBS on consecutive Sundays from April 17 to May 1, 2005. The miniseries is a part of the twenty-third season of the natural history documentary series Nature. Deep Jungle follows scientists and filmmakers as they use the latest technology to explore the jungles of fourteen countries around the world.

== Reception ==
The series was generally well received. Anita Gates at The New York Times said "the bird that moonwalks as part of its mating dance is pretty amazing," and "the story about Charles Darwin and the moth is just as satisfying." Overall, Gates described it as "a great-looking three-part "Nature" series". The Atlanta Journal-Constitution stated "The joy these scientists take in their work is infectious." Fred Kaufman, executive producer for Nature said that the miniseries "was a big success and we were looking to spin-off stories/people from it." As a result, the Nature episode "True Adventures of the Ultimate Spider-Hunter" was created with arachnologist Martin Nicholas who appeared in "Deep Jungle: Monsters of the Forest".

== Episode listing ==
No.	Title	Original release date
1	"New Frontiers"	April 17, 2005
For the first time, the Sumatran tiger is captured on film in the wild. The Central American manakin is better understood through the use of high-speed video cameras. Finding moths in Madagascar with 12-inch-long tongues, proves Charles Darwin's prediction right.
2	"Monsters of the Forest"	April 24, 2005
An exploration of the Amazon rainforest reveals giant tarantulas, the strangler fig tree, and a link between bees, orchids and the Brazil nut tree.
3	"The Beast Within"	May 1, 2005
In Uganda, the hunting behavior of chimpanzees is studied. In Brazil, capuchin monkeys are filmed using tools. In the Central African Republic, the western lowland gorilla is tracked.
