= Earthflight =

2011 British documentary TV series

- Genre: Nature documentary
- Narrated by: David Tennant
- Country of origin: United Kingdom
- Original language: English
- No. of episodes: 6

Production
- Executive producer: Cassian Harrison
- Producers: Robert Pilley; Philip Dalton; John Downer (Series)
- Running time: 60 mins
- Production companies: John Downer Productions; BBC Natural History Unit; Discovery Channel

Original release
- Network: BBC One; BBC HD
- Release: 29 December 2011 – 29 January 2012

Earthflight is a British nature documentary that shows a flight from the view of the wings of birds across six continents, showing some of the world's greatest natural spectacles from a bird's-eye view. The BBC series was created by John Downer and narrated by David Tennant and consisted of six 60-minute episodes. The first episode aired on BBC One on 29 December 2011.

A two-hour subset of Earthflight was aired in October 2012 by the Discovery Channel in the US as Winged Planet. The entire series with rerecorded narrative aired on PBS, beginning in September 2013, under the title Earthflight, A Nature Special Presentation.

As explained in the sixth episode, some of the birds were imprinted on a human and filmed from an ultralight plane; others were filmed with a helicopter drone. Some other footage resulted from tiny cameras being strapped to the backs of birds.

== Episodes ==
No.	Title	Produced by	UK viewers (million)	Share (%)	Original release date
1	"North America"	Robert Pilley	5.77	TBA	29 December 2011
A flock of snow geese flies north and is hunted by bald eagles. Pelicans are shown gliding under the Golden Gate Bridge. In California, pelicans reveal devil rays that perform astonishing somersaults and find bizarre grunion fish that wriggle ashore to spawn. In Alaska, bald eagles swoop among brown bears fishing for salmon. On the Great Plains, cowbirds duck and dive under the feet of fighting bison. Egrets follow a group of dolphins that strand themselves to feed; millions of shorebirds rendezvous with prehistoric horseshoe crabs emerging from the sea to lay eggs; and California gulls take us to Mono Lake, where they catch alkali flies by chasing them with open mouths.
2	"Africa"	Robert Pilley	5.08	TBA	5 January 2012
Arrow-dive with Cape gannets among sharks, dolphins and whales as they join the great sardine run. Soar with African fish eagles as they discover an S-shaped living island composed entirely of lesser flamingos, and join them on a spectacular hunt. Fly with kelp gulls as they study the hunting behaviour of the greatest underwater predator of all: the great white shark. On the wings of eagles, fly through the mist-filled Victoria Falls and dive for fish in the mighty Zambezi. Follow barn swallows and white storks on their annual voyage from south Africa to northern Europe. Circle with vultures high above the Serengeti as they watch the drama of the wildebeest migration below, and discover what happens when this canny scavenger suddenly becomes prey. Among toxic soda lakes, find out what it is like to be a flamingo, vulnerable to every predator on the continent, including baboons and hyenas. Join these flamingos as they take part in one of the most beautiful dances in the bird world.
3	"Europe"	Philip Dalton	4.62	TBA	12 January 2012
Earthflight departs on its grand European tour, using a host of techniques including taking extraordinary footage from microlights as they fly alongside imprinted birds with pilots like Christian Moullec. Among other wonders, cameras soar with cranes and geese over Venice, the white cliffs of Dover and Edinburgh. White storks leave Africa and struggle to reach Istanbul, the gateway to Europe, while cranes take an easier route over the monkey-guarded Rock of Gibraltar. In France, the white horses of the Camargue make a splash around the new arrivals. In Rome, the heat of the city lures 20 million starlings that perform nature's greatest aerial display to outwit peregrines. In Hungary, sand martins grab mayflies from the air; and at Bass Rock, gannets create Britain's greatest natural spectacle as they dive in exquisite slow-motion. The story takes an emotional turn as storks and swallows wait for their partners to return and indulge in a spot of DIY to impress. Finally, geese touch down in Svalbard to raise a family. To protect their young, a squadron of birds assemble to see off polar bears. With views of birds flying over the Loire Valley, London docklands and the bulb fields of the Netherlands, this is Europe as never before.
4	"South America"	Philip Dalton	TBA	TBA	19 January 2012
The documentary series gives a bird's-eye view of South America, as condors soar along the Andes, scarlet macaws explore the heart of the Amazon and hummingbirds and vultures see the continent's greatest sights. It is a journey that includes Machu Picchu, the Nasca Lines and the cities of Rio de Janeiro and Santiago. In Patagonia, giant petrels shadow killer whales as they hunt seals by stranding their huge bodies on the beach. At Iguassu Falls, dusky swifts dive through the cascades to huddle in communal roosts while hummingbirds bathe below. In a secret Andean location, condors soar in flocks over 40-strong and scavenge on casualties from herds of fighting guanacos. Elsewhere, a mother condor gently pushes her youngster to the edge of a 200-metre cliff, as flight school begins. Deep in the Amazon, macaws seek medicinal clay. They are joined by a host of secretive jungle animals, including spider monkeys and tapirs, all after the same remedy. In Peru, condors soar over fighting sealions waiting for casualties and on a mass exodus north, birds converge on the Panama Canal. In Costa Rica, black vultures descend on turtles as they lay their eggs in the sand and pick off the eggs that ping-pong through the air.
5	"Asia and Australia"	Robert Pilley	TBA	TBA	26 January 2012
In this bird's-eye view of two continents, demoiselle cranes negotiate a dangerous Himalayan pass on their way to India while high-flying bar-headed geese take the fast track five miles above. In Rajasthan, vultures watch hunting tigers hoping for a meal and pigeons visit a temple dedicated solely to sacred rats. Pigeons are also our guide to the greatest gatherings of camels on Earth and learn to dodge buzzards around the battlements of Jodhpur Fort. 9,000 cranes overwinter in the most unlikely of spots - a barbed wire compound in the centre of a desert town. In Australia, rainbow lorikeets drop in on Sydney and patrol Australia's Gold Coast. In the outback, white cockatoos swirl in thousands and budgerigars pass Uluru (Ayers Rock) and gather in the biggest flocks ever recorded. In China, swallows and swifts visit the Great Wall and the Forbidden City of Beijing. In Japan, the country's most revered birds - Japanese cranes are fed fish by appreciative locals and are joined in strange, momentary harmony by hungry red foxes, white-tailed eagles and Steller's eagles. As peace descends, Japanese cranes dance beautifully in the snow.
6	"Flying High"	-	TBA	TBA	29 January 2012
To fly like a bird, Earthflight not only captured remarkable images of wild flocks but also relied on some extraordinary relationships between people and birds. Filmed over four years, in six continents and more than 40 countries, the Earthflight team used many extraordinary techniques. For some of the unique flying shots, members of the team became part of the flock. The birds followed wherever they went - even in a microlight over Edinburgh and London. In Africa, paragliders floated alongside wild vultures, while a model vulture carried a camera inside the flock. In South America, wild-living macaws, that were rescued as babies, still come back to visit their 'foster mother' as he travels along a jungle river. In Africa, a radio-controlled 'drone' silently infiltrates masses of pink flamingos without disturbing a feather, and microlights and helicopters capture the dramatic moment white storks arrive over Istanbul. In Africa a tame vulture carried a camera across the African bush and recreated the behaviour of her wild relatives. Similarly, in the USA, a flock of hand-reared snow geese followed the migration route of wild flocks and took in the sights and sounds of New York - managing to get lost in Brooklyn.

== Merchandise ==
In the UK, a two-disc DVD was released on 26 March 2012, while the Blu-ray sets was released later month on 16 April 2012.

In United States and Canada, a two-disc DVD was released on 18 March 2014, and for Blu-ray Disc was released on 8 April 2014. It was distributed by BBC Warner.
