= Ocean Giants =

- Genre: Nature documentary
- Narrated by: Stephen Fry
- Country of origin: United Kingdom
- Original language: English
- No. of episodes: 3

Production
- Executive producer: Sara Ford
- Running time: 59–60 minutes
- Production companies: BBC Natural History Unit; PBS

Original release
- Network: BBC One
- Release: 14 August – 28 August 2011

Ocean Giants is a 2011 British nature documentary series narrated by actor Stephen Fry. The series is a production of the BBC Natural History Unit, and premiered on 14 August 2011. The documentaries focus on the life of dolphins and whales. The series includes film crew members who worked on the series Planet Earth. The camera operators featured in the show are Doug Allen, a winner of four Emmys and four BAFTAs for his work on filming marine mammals, and Didier Noirot, known for working with marine conservationist Jacques Cousteau.

The series consists of three episodes, each an hour long. The first episode, Giant Lives, focuses on humpback whales and blue whales, The second, Deep Thinkers, explores the cognitive abilities of dolphins. The third and final episode, Voices of the Sea, investigates the vocalizations of dolphins and whales. The series was released on DVD and Blu-ray on 6 March 2012 by BBC Home Entertainment, but only for the United States.

== Reception ==
The series premiered with 5.45 million viewers. Critical reception of the series was mixed. Benji Wilson of The Daily Telegraph criticized the first episode for being "underwhelming," writing that although the series showcased plenty of footage of the whales, "it’s hard for television to communicate their awesome bigness." Amol Rajan of The Independent voiced a similar concern, pointing out that "there was a failure to convey the sheer size of these beasts because the only thing we had to compare them with was each other." Rajan did praise the show for its underwater photography, calling it "stunning." Phil Hogan of The Guardian disliked the slow pacing of the series, writing that "it seemed to take hours to get [the whales] in and out of shot." Hogan commented that it was difficult to distinguish scenes of the humpback whales in battle with scenes of the whales merely swimming, although "there was action to be had... with killer whales."
