= Spirits of the Jaguar =

- Genre: Nature documentary
- Written by: Paul Reddish
- Narrated by: Alan Ereira
- Composer: Martin Friedel
- Country of origin: United Kingdom
- Original language: English
- No. of series: 1
- No. of episodes: 4

Production
- Executive producer: Michael Rosenberg
- Producers: Mark Jacobs (2 episodes); Paul Reddish (2 episodes)
- Running time: 50 minutes
- Production companies: BBC Natural History Unit; WNET/13

Original release
- Network: BBC Two
- Release: 1 December – 22 December 1996

Related
- Land of the Eagle; Land of the Tiger

Spirits of the Jaguar is a BBC nature documentary which aired on BBC Two in 1996. Narrated by Alan Ereira and created by Paul Reddish, the series documents the indigenous civilisations of Latin America and the Caribbean, and the relationship with the animals around them. It was part of the BBC Natural History Unit's Continents block.

== Episodes ==
1. The Forging of a New World

This episode talks about the volcanic origins of the Latin American region, and also looks at the evolution of its wildlife.

2. Forests of the Maya

This episode looks at the Maya civilization of southern Mexico and Central America and the animals which featured in their mythology, notably the jaguar.

3. Hunters of the Caribbean Sea

The penultimate episode looks at the Taino, who immigrated to the Caribbean 2000 years ago, the marine animals which provided food for the indigenous people, and ultimately, how they met their end when Christoper Columbus arrived in the region in 1492.

4. The Fifth World of the Aztecs

The final episode documents the rise and fall of the Aztecs, a powerful indigenous civilization which dominated northern Mexico, and the animals which inspired their mythology.
