= Land of the Tiger =

- Series title card
- Genre: Nature documentary
- Written by: Adrienne Nordby
- Presented by: Valmik Thapar
- Composer: Nicholas Hooper
- Country of origin: United Kingdom
- Original language: English
- No. of series: 1
- No. of episodes: 6

Production
- Executive producer: Mike Birkhead
- Producer: Colton Scott Hardy
- Running time: 50 minutes
- Production companies: BBC Natural History Unit; WNET/13

Original release
- Network: BBC Two
- Release: 17 November – 26 December 1997

Related
- Spirits of the Jaguar; Andes to Amazon

Land of the Tiger is a BBC nature documentary series exploring the natural history of the Indian subcontinent, first transmitted in the UK on BBC Two in 1997. The production team covered the breadth and depth of India, from the Himalayan mountains in the north to the reef-fringed islands of the Indian Ocean, to capture footage of the country's wild places and charismatic wildlife.

Land of the Tiger was co-produced by the BBC Natural History Unit and the WNET/13 network. It was produced by Mike Birkhead and presented by leading Indian naturalist Valmik Thapar. The series is characterised by scenes of Thapar riding on an elephant in locations across the country.

The series forms part of the Natural History Unit's Continents strand. It was preceded by Spirits of the Jaguar in 1996 and followed three years later by Andes to Amazon.

== Episodes ==
=== 1. "The Tiger's Domain" ===
The series begins in the Gir Forest in the western state of Gujarat. This is the last refuge of the Asiatic lion, which unlike its African cousin can be approached on foot, as demonstrated by presenter Valmik Thapar. After a preview of scenes from the forthcoming programmes, the rest of this episode concentrates on the wildlife of India's central forests and grasslands, the stronghold of the Bengal tiger. Much of the footage is from the Kanha National Park, a protected reserve. Here, the characters of Kipling's Jungle Book can still be observed, among them the sloth bear, wolf, dhole, and tiger. Many of the animals are sacred or revered by Hindus, including elephants, monkeys, peacocks and snakes. A female tiger with young cubs is filmed. To provide for her cubs, she must hunt. Spotted deer (or chital) are her favourite prey, but although distracted by the rut, her first hunt is unsuccessful. In the afternoon, chitals and langur monkeys move into open meadows, and here the female tiger succeeds in killing a langur. Other unusual behaviour filmed includes a golden jackal family defending their pups from a sloth bear and a peacock attacking a snake. Cobras are shown being protected by local villagers. The young are dug out of their underground nest and are handled by children despite the risk of a venomous bite (Thapar reveals that there are 20,000 deaths from cobra bites in India each year). The programme closes with a warning message. Wildlife of the central forests face an uncertain future due to disappearing habitat and poaching. Traditional beliefs instilled a feeling of respect for wild animals, but this is now being eroded

=== 2. "Sacred Waters" ===
The second programme features the wildlife of India's sacred rivers, the Ganges and Brahmaputra. Beginning at Devaprayag, the confluence of two tributaries which together give rise to the Ganges, Thapar explains how the fertility of the waters is dependent on the summer monsoon. The rains bring a peak flow of 1 billion US gallons (3,800,000 m^{3}) of water every second down the rivers, flooding the plains of northern India and Bangladesh with fertile silt. The Bharatpur wetland sanctuary near the Taj Mahal is actually a man-made environment but is now a haven for hundreds of thousands of birds, including 2,000 pairs of painted storks which are filmed building nests, mating, incubating eggs and feeding their chicks. Other animals shown are monitor lizards which prey on fallen eggs and chicks, fishing cats and endangered gharials, a fish-eating crocodile. Young gharials call to their mother as they hatch so she can dig them out of their underground nest. The females co-operate, taking turns to guard their vulnerable young in a crèche. As the monsoon draws to a close, more birds arrive, including sarus cranes, filmed conducting their courtship dances, and millions of waterfowl. The huge concentration attracts over thirty kinds of birds of prey. On the Brahmaputra in the north eastern state of Assam, Thapar introduces the animals of Kaziranga, including Indian rhino, wild elephants and one of the last populations of wild buffalo and barasingha. These attract a huge density of tigers, and one bold individual is filmed trying to take on an adult buffalo. The sacred rivers eventually flow into a vast delta at the Bay of Bengal, and here in the mangrove swamps of the Sundarbans, animals and people are adapted to the tidal conditions. Mudskippers, monitor lizards, macaques and pythons are all shown. It is also home to over 500 tigers and is now a protected reserve. In a remarkable sequence, the fishermen of the delta are shown using smooth-coated otters tethered to their boats to flush out fish into their nets.

=== 3. "Unknown Seas" ===
Opening the program at a traditional boatyard at Veraval in north-west India, Thapar travels down the Arabian Sea coast to the coral islands of Lakshadweep, encountering dolphins and a feeding whale shark along the way. The reefs around the islands teem with life. Powderblue surgeonfish are shown defending their algae garden from a parrotfish and, less successfully, from a marauding shoal of convict tangs. The abundant reef fish attract predators such as the bluefin jack, whitetip reef shark and, 30m down on the sandy bottom, a stingray. In the evening, land-based hermit crabs come down to the beaches to scavenge for food. A sequence filmed at night shows sharks, moray eels and groupers hunting on the reef. The islanders are filmed climbing coconut palms and fishing for tuna, displaying adept teamwork. The journey continues around the southern tip of India to the Indian Ocean, where shoaling manta rays are encountered. Pulicat is one of the few unspoilt places on the eastern coast, and is home to many wading birds and waterfowl. Spot-billed pelicans fly with fully laden beaks 40 km inland to the huge pelicanry at Nelapattu where 1,500 birds gather to raise their young. 1200 km off the east coast lie the Andaman and Nicobar Islands. Isolated from mainland Asia 60 million years ago and now home to unique species. Many are uninhabited and still covered in pristine rainforest. Logging is a problem – working elephants are used in the timber industry and are filmed swimming between the islands. The Nicobar megapode is an endemic bird that incubates its eggs in a mound of sand and rotting vegetation. Cunning monitor lizards are filmed stealing the eggs and laying their own in the mound, which is still attended to by the oblivious birds. Animals filmed in the reefs around the islands include damselfish, clownfish and cuttlefish. Olive ridley turtles mate at sea and come ashore at Gahirmatha beach in their thousands, where Thapar watches the millions of hatchlings return to the water.

=== 4. "Desert Kingdom" ===
India's Thar Desert spans the western states of Rajasthan and Gujarat. More people live here than in any other desert, with a population density 100 times that of the Sahara, and growing all the time. Fortunately the people of the desert look favourably on their wild neighbours, as demonstrated by the villagers of Khichan, who feed large flocks of demoiselle cranes over the winter. The birds are revered as symbols of fortune. Thapar visits a desert dwelling of the Bishnoi people, strict vegetarians and guardians of the animal population. Despite this, poaching is rife and the blackbucks, filmed in the breeding season, are being increasingly marginalised. The chinkara or Indian gazelle is an even hardier animal, getting all the moisture it needs from plants and the morning dew. Wolves and golden jackals are also shown. Around a camp fire, the nocturnal inhabitants of the desert are filmed as they emerge from the sand: dung beetles, gerbils and predatory saw scaled vipers and scorpions. The people of Jodhpur are vegetarians but use cattle, camels and domestic water buffaloes as working animals. When they die, the carcasses are taken to the edge of the city and left as food for scavengers, among them Red-headed vultures, Indian white-rumped vultures and griffon vultures. Waterholes attract many animals before they dry up during the heat of summer. It is also used by people and their livestock for washing and drinking. Birds shown include pied kingfisher, red-wattled lapwing and black-winged stilt. To escape egrets, frogs hop across the surface of the water. At night, climbing perch leave the water and travel across land to find other pools, and an ingenious honey badger uses logs to reach a stricken kingfisher chick. The most extreme environment is the Rann of Kutch salt flats where only the monsoon brings relief to the last population of Indian wild asses. In the closing scenes, Thapar observes flocks of flamingos which come to the salt flats in times of flood.

=== 5. "Mountains of the Gods" ===
The Himalayas, created during the collision of the Indian and Asiatic continental plates, form the northern boundary of the Indian subcontinent. Valmik Thapar begins in the cold, dry desert of Ladakh, the northernmost region of India. A sequence of aerial mountain shots and typical fauna including snow leopard, Himalayan ibex and lammergeier is shown, followed by scenes of Buddhist monasteries and winter festivals. The Buddhist's respect for all nature stems from the ancient animist belief system in which animals were thought of as living embodiments of the spirit world. Wildlife is often plentiful around villages, where chukar, robin accentor and red-billed chough are commonly seen. Temperatures plunge to -30 Celsius in winter. Bharal can survive at great height by digging for roots or even climbing trees. Across the border in Pakistan, markhor are not so hardy, and must descend to lower elevations. In spring, melting snows reveal winter's casualties. Himalayan griffon vultures strip a carcass in 20 minutes, then lammergeiers carry away the bones. Further west in the meadows of Deosai, rarities such as Himalayan brown bears, kiang and black-necked cranes are filmed. Bar-headed geese cross the mountains to breed here, and marmots play fight in the meadows. Thapar then travels to the south side of the mountains where lush forests of oak, birch, spruce and rhododendron thrive on the monsoon rains. Animals in this region include Himalayan tahr, yellow-throated marten and grey langurs, shown feeding on Indian horse chestnut shoots. The golden langur, discovered in the 1950s, survives in the wild only in Bhutan and western Assam. In the north east of India, the animals of the Arunachal Pradesh are very different. Here, species from China and East Asia have colonised the forests. They include spectacular pheasants such as Himalayan monal, Temminck's tragopan and Blyth's tragopan. Mammals include red panda, Malayan giant squirrel and Hoolock gibbon, India's only non-human ape. Valmik Thapar ends the programme at Namo Buddha in Nepal where legend has it Lord Buddha gave his life to a starving tigress and her cubs, and in doing so instilled a protective attitude to all creatures in his followers.

=== 6. "Monsoon Forest" ===
The final programme looks at India's dwindling rainforests, now confined to the Western Ghats, upper Assam and Sri Lanka. The once extensive forests have been decimated by logging, firewood collection and hunting. In the opening scene, Valmik Thapar tracks lion-tailed macaques in southern India, a very rare fruit and seed eating monkey. In the Western Ghats, there are 120 species of amphibian, including flying frogs. Invertebrates use colour for camouflage, warning and defence, but mantises and crickets still fall prey to slow-moving chameleons. A faster reptile, the flying lizard, is shown gliding from tree to tree. Also filmed is the ancient practice of collecting honey from wild bees' nests high in the canopy. Birds visiting a fruiting fig tree include great Indian hornbills, Malabar grey hornbills, blossom-headed parakeets and fairy bluebirds. Mammals are also attracted by the fruit: Nilgiri langurs, bonnet macaques and Malabar giant squirrels. On the forest floor, wild boar and barking deer feed on the rejected figs, drawing a prowling leopard. Monkeys spot the danger and raise the alarm. The many varieties of fig tree provide food year-round for all these animals. Each fig is pollinated by a particular species of wasp, which lay their eggs in the fruits. Thapar visits the world's largest fig, a sacred banyan tree that draw pilgrims from far and wide. In the hill forests of southern India, Thapar tracks Nilgiri tahr on the grassy peaks. Here, the rains last for 6 months, creating huge waterfalls. The Sinharaja forest of Sri Lanka has more unique species than anywhere else on the subcontinent, including dozens of kinds of jumping spiders, each with their own courtship signals. A tiger is filmed stalking a rutting gaur herd. Gaur are the world's biggest cattle but they have been known to fall prey to tigers. The program ends on a sober note, filming elephants crossing tea plantations where forests once stood. The problem elephants are caught and trained as working animals. A wild calf is shown being caught by lasso. The distressed animal is broken by torture, but it is also worshipped: one of the paradoxes of the subcontinent.

== Merchandise ==
A book, soundtrack CD, and VHS cassette were all released to accompany the TV series:

- The series has been released on Region 2 DVD in the Netherlands with the original English audio track, bundled with the Michael Wood history series The Story of India in a collection entitled The Story of India and Its Wild Nature. In the UK, a double VHS cassette of the series was released on 2 February 1998 by BBC Video; it is now only available second hand.
- The accompanying hardcover book, Land of the Tiger: A Natural History of the Indian Subcontinent by Valmik Thapar, was published by BBC Books on 6 November 1997 (ISBN 0-563-37179-X).
- The music for the series by composer Nicholas Hooper incorporates traditional Indian instruments and won a Panda award at the 1998 Wildscreen festival and a nomination at the Royal Television Society awards. A soundtrack CD was released by BBC Music on 10 September 1999.

== See also ==
- The Story of India
