= Spy in the Wild =

British nature documentary television series

- Genre: Nature documentary
- Narrated by: David Tennant (Original Version); Brian Unger (PBS Version)
- Composer: Will Gregory
- Country of origin: United Kingdom
- Original language: English
- No. of seasons: 2
- No. of episodes: 9

Production
- Executive producer: John Downer
- Producer: John Downer
- Running time: 60 minutes
- Production companies: John Downer Productions; BBC Natural History Unit; PBS

Original release
- Network: BBC One; BBC One HD
- Release: 12 January 2017 – 19 February 2020

Spy in the Wild is a British nature documentary television series, produced by BBC Natural History Unit, John Downer Productions and PBS. The series, which is directed and produced by John Downer, premiered in 2017 with a second series in 2020. The employment of animatronics makes it possible to document interactive behaviour no animal would have shown towards a human filmmaker or in front of a hidden camera.

== Broadcast ==
The first series ran for five episodes from 12 January 2017 and concluded on 3 February 2017, and aired on BBC One. The series focuses on the complex emotions and ethology of animals, using more than 30 specially built animatronic "spy creatures", often shaped like the offsprings of the species.

The series was narrated by David Tennant in the original version, while Brian Unger provides substitute narration in the American PBS version as it was broadcast under Nature Special Presentation series.

== Spy creatures ==
Spy creatures included:

- Orangutan
- Bushbaby
- Hippopotamus
- Penguin
- Egret
- Crocodile hatchling
- Meerkat
- Tortoise
- Prairie dog
- Macaw
- Sloth
- Cobra
- Squirrel
- Adelie penguin
- Koala
- Wolf pup
- Otter
- Grizzly
- Wild boar
- Gorilla
- Bald eagle
- Pelican
- Hummingbird
- Elephant seal
- Komodo dragon
- Pygmy elephant
- King penguin
- Quokka
- Snowball
- Acorn
- Jaguar
- Parrot
- Iguana
- Polar bear
- Beaver
- Crab
- Pufferfish
- Puffin
- Langur monkey
- Kangaroo
- Snowy owl
- Ostrich
- Woodpecker
- Boulder
- Chameleon
- Dolphin
- Moose
- Sapsucker
- Groundhog
- Centipede
- Termite

== Series overview ==
Series	Episodes	Originally released	
Series	Episodes	First released	Last released
1	5	12 January 2017	3 February 2017
2	4	22 January 2020	19 February 2020

== Episodes ==
=== Season 1 (2017) ===
No. overall	No. in season	Title	Original release date
1	1	"Love"	12 January 2017
Spy Creatures explore the rarely seen emotions of animals, revealing if they are as strong and complex as our own. Join the “spycams” as they are accepted into a wild dog pack, witness elephant love, and are mourned by a troop of monkeys.
2	2	"Intelligence"	19 January 2017
Spy Creatures infiltrate the world of animal intelligence, ingenuity, and creativity. Watch our spies disguised as animals observe a gray squirrel stealing Spy Nut, a sea otter cracking open a meal, and an orangutan washing with soap.
3	3	"Friendship"	26 January 2017
Spy Creatures and their new wild friends rely on each other to look out for predators. A Spy Meerkat babysits meerkat pups while a Spy Cobra pretends to attack the mob. Spy Crocs witness a convenient partnership between real crocodiles and birds.
4	4	"Mischief/Bad Behavior"	2 February 2017
Spy Creatures infiltrate the underground world of animal mischief, crime, and retribution. Spy Monkey is caught between crossfires as real monkeys fight over beach bar alcohol. Spy Egret is also a waterhole victim when elephants throw mud everywhere.
5	5	"Meet the Spies"	3 February 2017
The final episode explains how the concept of the Spy Creatures evolved at John Downer Productions from the original Bouldercam to the Penguincams that inspired the next-generation “spycams” featured in this series. It shows the painstaking work that goes into building the lifelike models and how the team deploys and operates the robotic cameras on location all over the world. It contains funny and unexpected moments, much of which is experienced from the viewpoint of the “spycams” themselves.

=== Season 2 (2020) ===
No. overall	No. in season	Title	Original release date
6	1	"The Tropics"	January 22, 2020
The spy creatures investigate the wildlife that thrives in the tropics. They infiltrate a hippo pod, a nursery of red flying foxes, a gorilla sanctuary and the secret world of pygmy forest elephants.
7	2	"The North"	January 29, 2020
Travel to the Northern Hemisphere, where the spy creatures learn how animals move, feed and fight. A spy hummingbird films millions of butterflies, and a spy squirrel winds up in a battle. A spy beaver observes other beavers building dams.
8	3	"The Islands"	February 12, 2020
Explore the islands of the South Pacific with creatures like the spy koala, who captures breeding behavior in Australia, or the spy crab, who joins an army of red crabs on their march to the sea to deposit their eggs.
9	4	"The Poles"	February 19, 2020
From penguin chicks to elephant seals and wolf cubs to polar bears, the spy creatures meet and observe the hardiest and most charismatic animals in the Arctic and Antarctic circles.

== Reception ==
Tim Goodman of The Hollywood Reporter called the miniseries, "Pretty incredible."

== Merchandise ==
=== DVD and Blu-ray ===
A two-disc DVD and two-disc Blu-ray set for the series were released on 20 March 2017. Both were distributed by Spirit Entertainment in the UK.

In the United States and Canada, only Series 1 was released to DVD, divided into two separate volumes, released on 28 February and 15 August 2017, respectively. These DVDs contain the original British versions with David Tennant's narration.
