= Ted Oakes =

Canadian biologist and film maker

- Occupations: Filmmaker, Biologist
- Years active: 2005-present
- Known for: Films on nature

Ted Oakes is a Canadian-born filmmaker and biologist who worked at the BBC Natural History Unit for 20 years. He founded Oak Island Films in 2017 and has been managing director since. He has collaborated with BBC, TVO, Smithsonian Channel, Discovery Channel and Merit Motion Pictures.

== Education ==
Oakes completed his MSc. in biology, at Queen's University, Canada in 1989 and a PhD. in zoology at Oxford University, UK in 1996

== Film career ==
Series
Year	Title	Production company	Position	Refs
2022	Great Lakes Untamed	Oak Island Films	Director, Executive Producer	
2021	Cheetah Family & Me	BBC2	Executive Producer	
2019	Snow Cats & Me	BBC2	Executive Producer	
2018	Grizzly Bear Cubs & Me	BBC2	Executive Producer	
2017	Tribes, Predators & Me	BBC2	Executive Producer	
2016	Elephant Family & Me	BBC2	Executive Producer	
2015	Gorilla Family and Me	BBC2	Executive Producer	
2015	This Wild Life	BBC2	Executive Producer	
2014	The Snow Wolf Family & Me	BBC2	Series Producer	
2013	Operation Snow Tiger	BBC2	Series Producer	
2013	The Polar Bear Family & Me	BBC2	Series Producer	
2012	Planet Earth Live	BBC1	Consulting Producer	
2011	The Bear Family & Me	BBC2	Series Producer	
2005	Amazon Abyss	BBC2	Producer	
2005	Apes in Danger	BBC2	Producer	
DOCUMENTARIES
2020	The Hunt for Escobar's Hippos	CH5	Series Producer	
2009	(Ep. 3) Life: Mammals	BBC1	Director, Producer	
2009	(S.28 Ep.1) Natural World: Bearwalker of the Northwoods	BBC NHU	Director, Producer	

== Honours, Awards & Nominations ==
=== Honours ===
- Front Cover Radio Times for Operation Snow Tiger 2013, BBC2/Discovery
- 2021 Fellow of the Royal Canadian Geographical Society

=== Awards and nominations ===
Award	Year	Title	Distributor	Category	Result
RTS Scotland	2023	Snow Dogs - Into The Wild	BBC2/Animal Planet	'Best On-Screen Personality'	Won
RTS Scotland	2023	Snow Dogs - Into The Wild	BBC2/Animal Planet	'Best Camera Craft'	Won
RTS Scotland	2023	Snow Dogs - Into The Wild	BBC2/Animal Planet	'Best Sound Craft'	Won
RTS Scotland	2021	Gordon Buchanan's Cheetah Family & Me	BBC2	'Best Science & Natural History'	Won
IVOR NOVELLA	2016	Elephant Family & Me	BBC2	'Best Music'	Nominated
The Observer	2017	Tribes, Predators & Me	BBC2	'Best TV Show of 2017’	Won
RTS West	2017	Tribes, Predators & Me	BBC2	'Best Presenter' & 'Best Natural History Program'	Nominated
BBC NHU	2014	The Snow Wolf Family & Me	BBC2/Animal Planet	'Gierson Award'	Nominated
Primetime Emmy	2010	Life Series	BBC1/Discovery	'Best Cinematography’	Won
Jackson Hole	2003	Monsters We Met	BBC2/Animal Planet	'Best CGI'	Won
RTS	2001	Venom	BBC1	‘Best Graphics’	Won

== Writing career ==
- 2003 Monsters We Met — BBC Books
- 2009 Life — BBC Books

== Mentoring ==
Oakes has been a mentor for Wildscreen since 2023 and he has mentored Youth Ambassadors through the Ocean Pathways placement programs at Ocean Wise since 2021.
