= OAD =

Oad or OAD may refer to:

== Science and technology ==
- Auditory processing disorder or obscure auditory dysfunction (OAD), an auditory condition
- Object-oriented analysis and design, a software engineering approach
- Office of Astronomy for Development, an office of the International Astronomical Union
- Open Access Directory, founded by Peter Suber and Robin Peek
- Original Acquisition Disk, in digital forensics

== Other uses ==
- Original animation DVD, an anime release bundled with its source-material manga
- Oad (caste), a social group of South Asia
- Oad language, an Indo-Aryan language
- Oad Street, a hamlet in Kent, England
- Oad Swigart (1915–1997), American baseball player
- Ordo Augustiniensium Discalceatorum, a Catholic religious order
- Oxford American Dictionary
