= Richard Horton (editor) =

British medical editor

Richard Horton OBE FRCPCH FMedSci
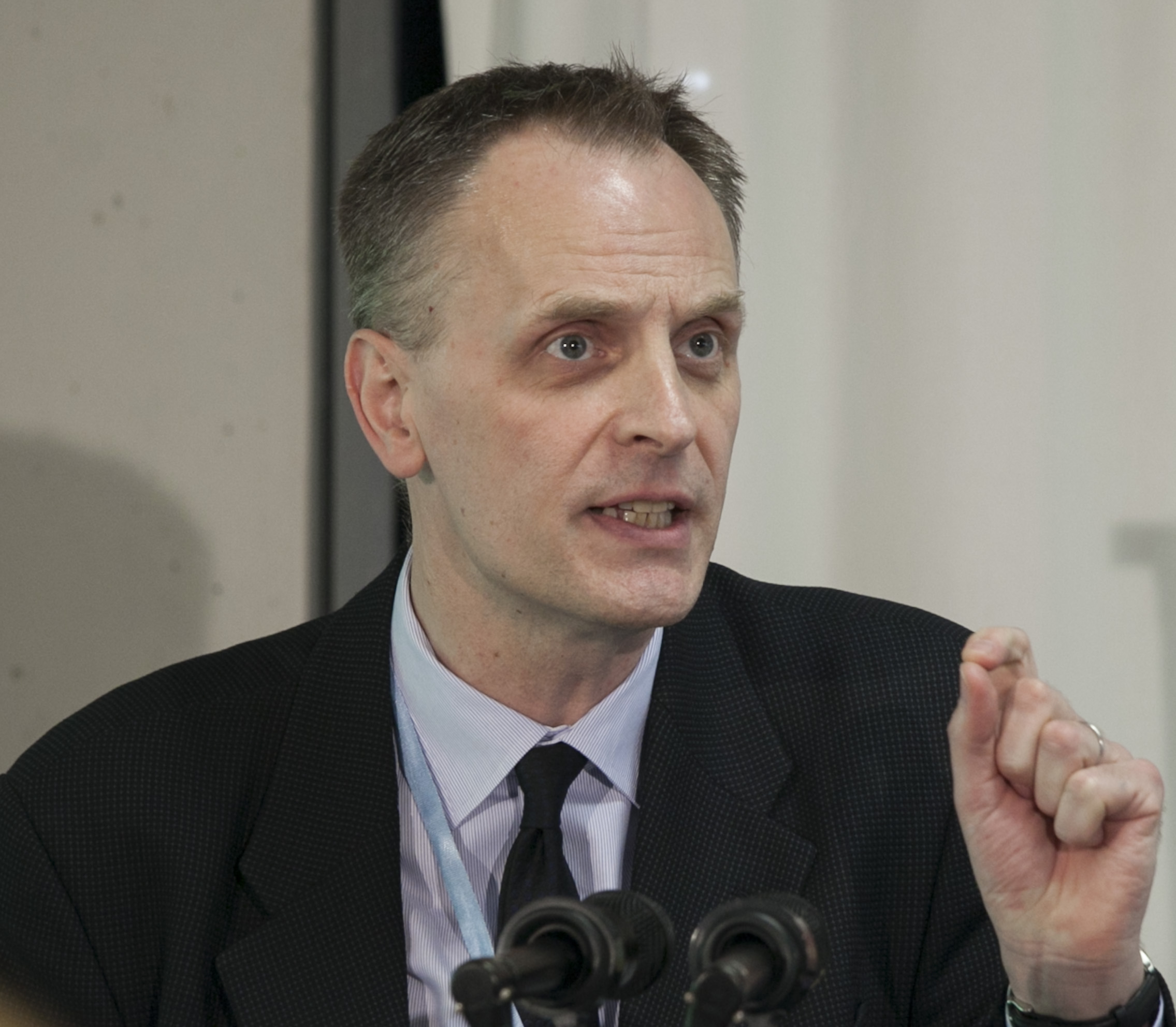
- Horton in 2013
- Born: Richard Charles Horton; 29 December 1961 (age 64)
- Education: Bristol Grammar School; University of Birmingham (BSc, MB ChB)
- Partner: Ingrid Johanna Wolfe (m. 1998; sep. 2017)
- Children: 1
- Awards: Edinburgh Medal (2007), Friendship Award (China) (2015), Andrija Štampar (2016), Edwin Chadwick (2017), Roux Prize (2019), Physicians for Human Rights (2021)
- Scientific career
- Workplaces: The Lancet; Royal Free Hospital; London School of Hygiene and Tropical Medicine

Richard Charles Horton (born 29 December 1961) is a British journalist who serves as editor-in-chief of The Lancet, a United Kingdom–based medical journal. He is an honorary professor at the London School of Hygiene and Tropical Medicine, University College London, and the University of Oslo.

After studying medicine at the University of Birmingham, he joined the liver unit at London's Royal Free Hospital. In 1990, he became assistant editor of The Lancet and five years later became its editor-in-chief in the UK.

He has been a medical writer for The Observer, The Times Literary Supplement and The New York Review of Books. In 2003, he published Second Opinion: Doctors, Diseases and Decisions in Modern Medicine, a book about controversies in modern medicine. In 2005 he wrote "Doctors in society: medical professionalism in a changing world", an inquiry into the future of medical professionalism, for the Royal College of Physicians. He has served in various roles with the World Health Organization (WHO).

== Early life and education ==
Richard Horton was born in London. His early education was at Bristol Grammar School.

In 1986 he completed his studies at the University of Birmingham, having gained a Bachelor of Science degree in physiology and a degree in medicine.

== Career ==
After completing his early medical training at Birmingham, he joined the liver unit at London's Royal Free Hospital. In 1990, he became assistant editor of The Lancet and in 1993 moved to New York as its North American editor. Two years later he returned to the UK to become its editor-in-chief.

Horton served as a medical columnist for The Observer and has written for The Times Literary Supplement and The New York Review of Books. In 2003, he published his book about controversies in modern medicine, Second Opinion: Doctors, Diseases and Decisions in Modern Medicine. In 2005, as a member of a working party set up by the Royal College of Physicians, he was the chief author of their report into the future of medical professionalism, "Doctors in Society".

Horton is an advocate for the WHO. He has co-chaired a WHO Scientific Advisory Group on Clinical trials registration, chaired the Board of the Health Metrics Network, sat on the External Reference Group for WHO's Research Strategy, and was an external advisory board member for the WHO European Region. Horton was the first president of the World Association of Medical Editors, and was a past-president of the US Council of Science Editors (2005–06). In 2008, he was appointed to a research and analytical management panel as a Senior Associate of the Nuffield Trust. In 2011, he was elected to the US Institute of Medicine. From 2011 to 2015 he co-chaired the independent Expert Review Group on Information and Accountability for Women's and Children' Health.

In 2016, he was appointed by United Nations Secretary-General Ban Ki-moon to an expert group advising the High-Level Commission on Health Employment and Economic Growth, which was co-chaired by presidents François Hollande of France and Jacob Zuma of South Africa. In 2017, he served on the Office of the United Nations High Commissioner for Human Rights (OHCHR) High-Level Working Group on the Health and Human Rights of Women, Children and Adolescents. In the same year he joined Physicians for Human Rights's board.

=== Climate change and health professionals ===
A few days after the worldwide mobilisation promoted by the activist movement Extinction Rebellion, Horton asserted in a video that health professionals should involve themselves directly.

In 2024 Horton wrote in The Lancet advocating for the biorenaissance written about by academic Stephen Boyden.

=== Denial of retraction of discredited vaccine paper ===
On 28 February 1998 Horton published a controversial paper by Andrew Wakefield and 12 co-authors with the title "Ileal-lymphoid-nodular hyperplasia, non-specific colitis, and pervasive developmental disorder in children" suggesting that vaccines could cause autism. The publication of the paper set off a sharp decline in vaccinations in Europe and America and in subsequent years globally. In the United Kingdom, the Health Protection Agency attributed a large measles outbreak in 2008 and 2009 to a concurrent drop in the number of children receiving the MMR vaccine. Pockets of measles – which can be fatal —have also cropped up in Canada and the United States as a result of parents' decision not to vaccinate.

Horton was heavily criticised for refusing to take action for so long. He was finally forced to retract the paper in February 2010 after the General Medical Council (GMC), which oversees doctors in Britain, said that "there was a biased selection of patients in The Lancet paper" and that Wakefield's "conduct in this regard was dishonest and irresponsible". According to reporter Brian Deer, who exposed Wakefield's paper as fraudulent, Horton opposed the GMC's investigation that led to the retraction, arguing:

My own view is that the GMC is no place to continue this debate. But the process has started and it will be impossible to stop.

Horton defended his position by saying "I do not regret publishing the original Wakefield paper. Progress in medicine depends on the free expression of new ideas. I worked at the Royal Free from 1988 to 1990 and met him on many occasions. He is a committed, engaging, and charismatic clinician and scientist. He asks big questions about diseases - what are their ultimate causes? - and his ambition often brings quick and impressive results." However, there are groups criticising Horton for contributing to the ongoing dramatic drop of vaccination of children in Europe and America that causes several epidemics and deaths by delaying the retraction of the paper for 12 years.

=== Royal Society ===
In the 11 May 2005 The Lancet, Horton criticized the British scientific group, the Royal Society, under Lord Rees for its neglect of medicine.

=== Roy Meadow ===
Horton published an article in 2005 supporting paediatrician Roy Meadow who had been charged with serious professional misconduct by the GMC for giving erroneous and seriously misleading evidence in the Sally Clark trial. This was especially controversial as the article appeared whilst the GMC proceedings were still under way and was published on the first day of Meadow's defence. The article "incensed" Clark, a solicitor who had been the victim of a serious miscarriage of justice. With the support of erroneous statistical (and other) evidence from Meadow, the prosecution wrongly convicted her of murder and she spent over three years in prison before her successful second appeal.

Her husband wrote a rebuttal letter to The Lancet in order to correct Horton's 'many inaccuracies and one-sided opinions' and to prevent them from prejudicing independent observers. James Le Fanu, medical practitioner and writer, also wrote to The Lancet in the same issue and described Horton's words as 'mischief'. The Clark family issued a statement addressing and countering with established fact each of the points making up Horton's biased support of Meadow.

=== Iraq War ===
At the Time to Go Demo of 23 September 2006, Horton accused American president George W. Bush and British prime minister Tony Blair of lies and killing children in Iraq. On 11 October, The Lancet published new estimates of the death toll of Iraqi citizens after the US-led invasion in 2003, putting it at a total of 655,000. Some supporters of the invasion of Iraq dismissed it for what they claimed was flawed methodology. Some opponents of the invasion questioned its reliability due to its extreme divergence from other data on the conflict. Some journals and statistical experts were supportive. Other experts in the field were not convinced, saying the estimates were "high, and probably way too high", and that the authors had published a "misinterpretation of their own figures". Others were incredulous that the survey could have been performed as reported under such dangerous conditions.

Iraq's health minister estimated during a press conference in November 2006 that between 100,000 and 150,000 people had died since the invasion in 2003, based on an estimate of around 100 deaths per day brought to morgues and hospitals during 2006, while saying that the Lancet estimates were an "exaggerated number".

=== Open letter for the people of Gaza ===
In August 2014 The Lancet published an open letter for the people of Gaza, criticising Israel in the wake of the 2014 Gaza conflict.

Horton responded to criticism of the letter by saying that it was "a smear campaign" and that he didn't "honestly see what all this has to do with the Gaza letter. I have no plans to retract the letter, and I would not retract the letter even if it was found to be substantiated". However, Horton subsequently came to Israel's Rambam Hospital for a visit and said that he "deeply, deeply regret[ted] the completely unnecessary polarization that publication of the letter by Paola Manduca caused".

Mark Pepys accused Horton of "wholly inappropriate use of The Lancet as a vehicle for his own extreme political views." In response, Horton said: "How can you separate politics and health? The two go hand-in-hand."

=== Coronavirus pandemic ===
Horton's initial response to the outbreak of COVID-19 was cautious, telling his Twitter followers on 23 January 2020 that COVID-19 probably "has moderate transmissibility and relatively low pathogenicity." But, as evidence came in from China, on 29 January, he said: "It must now surely be time to declare a Public Health Emergency of International Concern." And, on 31 January, he tweeted about "draconian measures that limit population mobility."

By 7 March, Horton was calling on the UK Government to "act more decisively. They must abandon their fears of the negative short-term public and economic consequences that may follow from restricting public freedoms." And, on 10 March, he called for the "urgent implementation of social distancing and closure policies."

On 18 March, Horton strongly criticised the Government's initial plans "to allow a controlled epidemic", saying: "Any numerate school student could make the calculation. With a mortality of 1% among 60% of a population of some 66 million people, the UK could expect almost 400,000 deaths."

Then on 26 March, he said: "We knew in the last week of January that this was coming. The message from China was absolutely clear that a new virus with pandemic potential was hitting cities. ... We knew that eleven weeks ago and then we wasted February when we could have acted." And, on 28 March, Horton's Lancet editorial stated that, having seen January's reports from China, the authorities "had a duty to immediately put the NHS and British public on high alert."

On 29 March, the NHS Coronavirus director, Keith Willett, responded to Horton saying that the NHS had "declared a Level Four – the highest – National Emergency on 30 January". (This declaration, however, was not publicised until 3 March so it is unclear if Willett intended this as a response to Horton's Lancet editorial.)

On 1 May, Horton was interviewed for the Chinese news program Xinwen Lianbo and praised the 'innovation' of the Chinese response (as compared to the past).

By 16 May, an editorial explained that the U.S. Centers for Disease Control and Prevention had been weakened since the 1980s and needs rebuilding. It included a call for a U.S. president in 2021 who values public health over partisan politics.

== Honours and awards ==
Horton is a Fellow of both the Academy of Medical Sciences and the Royal College of Physicians.

In 2007, he received the Edinburgh Medal for scientific and professional contributions to the understanding and well-being of humanity. Two years later he was awarded the Dean's Medal from Johns Hopkins Bloomberg School of Public Health.

In 2015, he received the Friendship Award from Government of China. He has worked closely with Chinese medical experts and healthcare officials since 2008.

In 2016, he received the Andrija Štampar medal from the Association of Schools of Public Health in the European region. The following year, for his work in public health, he was a recipient of the Edwin Chadwick Medal.

In 2019, he received the Roux Prize.

In 2021, he received the Physicians for Human Rights award.

Horton is an honorary professor at the London School of Hygiene and Tropical Medicine, the University College London, and the University of Oslo. For his work in global health, he was an honoured with a doctorate at the University of Tromsø. He is a council member of the University of Birmingham.

He was appointed Officer of the Order of the British Empire (OBE) in the 2023 New Year Honours for services to health and medical journalism.

== Personal and family life ==
In 1998, Horton married paediatrician Ingrid Johanna Wolfe. They separated in 2017. He has one daughter from this marriage. He is being treated for stage 4 melanoma.

He has been inspired by Raymond Hoffenberg and Amartya Sen.

== Selected publications ==
=== Books ===
- Health Wars: On the Global Front Lines of Modern Medicine. A New York Review Collection.
- The COVID-19 Catastrophe: What's Gone Wrong and How To Stop It Happening Again. June 2020. ISBN 978-1-5095-4910-8.

=== Articles ===
- Horton, Richard (1996). "Surgical research or comic opera: Questions, but few answers". The Lancet. 347 (9007): 984–985. doi:10.1016/S0140-6736(96)90137-3. PMID 8606606. S2CID 34370179. (Joint author)
- Begg, C. (1996). "Improving the quality of reporting of randomized controlled trials. The CONSORT statement". Journal of the American Medical Association. 276 (8): 637–639. doi:10.1001/jama.276.8.637. PMID 8773637. (Joint author)
- Beaglehole, Robert; Bonita, Ruth; Horton, Richard; Adams, Cary; Alleyne, George; Asaria, Perviz; Baugh, Vanessa; Bekedam, Henk; Billo, Nils; Casswell, Sally; Cecchini, Michele; Colagiuri, Ruth; Colagiuri, Stephen; Collins, Tea; Ebrahim, Shah; Engelgau, Michael; Galea, Gauden; Gaziano, Thomas; Geneau, Robert; Haines, Andy; Hospedales, James; Jha, Prabhat; Keeling, Ann; Leeder, Stephen; Lincoln, Paul; McKee, Martin; MacKay, Judith; Magnusson, Roger; Moodie, Rob; et al. (2011). "Priority actions for the non-communicable disease crisis". The Lancet. 377 (9775): 1438–47. doi:10.1016/S0140-6736(11)60393-0. PMID 21474174. S2CID 390617. (Joint author)
- Davidoff, Frank (2001). "Sponsorship, Authorship, and Accountability". Journal of the American Medical Association. 286 (10): 1232–4. doi:10.1001/jama.286.10.1232. PMID 11559271. (Joint author)
- De Angelis, Catherine; Drazen, Jeffrey M.; Frizelle, Frank A.; Haug, Charlotte; Hoey, John; Horton, Richard; Kotzin, Sheldon; Laine, Christine; Marusic, Ana; Overbeke, A. John P.M.; Schroeder, Torben V.; Sox, Hal C.; Weyden, Martin B. Van Der (2004). "Clinical Trial Registration: A Statement from the International Committee of Medical Journal Editors". New England Journal of Medicine. 351 (12): 1250–1. doi:10.1056/NEJMe048225. PMID 15356289. (Joint author)
- Horton, Richard (2014). "Offline: The moribund body of medical history". The Lancet. 384 (9940): 292. doi:10.1016/S0140-6736(14)61050-3. S2CID 54248096.
- Horton, Richard (2015). "Offline: What is medicine's 5 sigma?". The Lancet. 385 (9976): 1380. doi:10.1016/S0140-6736(15)60696-1. S2CID 54242315.
- Manduca, Paola; Chalmers, Iain; Summerfield, Derek; Gilbert, Mads; Ang, Swee (2014). "An open letter for the people in Gaza". The Lancet. 384 (9941): 397–398. doi:10.1016/S0140-6736(14)61044-8. hdl:11567/812026. PMID 25064592. S2CID 4672171. (Joint author)

=== Other publications ===
- "Doctors in society: medical professionalism in a changing world". Royal College of Physicians. Report of a Working Party of the Royal College of Physicians of London. London: RCP, 2005.
- "Innovating for health: patients, physicians, the pharmaceutical industry and the NHS". Royal College of Physicians. Report of a Working Party of the Royal College of Physicians of London. London: RCP, 2009.
