= In the Hide: How the Natural World Saved My Life =

2025 memoir by Gordon Buchanan

In the Hide
- First edition hardback cover
- Author: Gordon Buchanan with Will Millard
- Language: English
- Subject: Nature writing, wildlife filmmaking
- Genre: Memoir
- Publisher: Witness Books
- Publication date: 6 February 2025
- Publication place: United Kingdom
- Media type: Print (hardback), e-book, audiobook
- Pages: 320
- ISBN: 978-1-529-14426-0 (hardback)

In the Hide: How the Natural World Saved My Life is a 2025 memoir by Scottish wildlife cameraman, filmmaker and presenter Gordon Buchanan. It was published by Witness Books, an imprint of Ebury Publishing, in February 2025. It is Buchanan's first book.

The book combines accounts of Buchanan's childhood in Dumbarton and on the Isle of Mull with recollections of his career filming wildlife around the world. Alongside encounters with animals and the practicalities of wildlife filmmaking, it deals with domestic abuse during his childhood, his later experiences of depression, and the role that immersion in the natural world has played in his life. He told The Observer that revisiting his childhood while writing the memoir led him to reconsider the lasting effect of domestic abuse within his family and the feelings of inadequacy that he believed had subsequently helped drive his career.

== Background and writing ==
Buchanan initially envisaged the book primarily as a collection of stories about his adventures as a wildlife filmmaker. During its writing, however, it developed into a more personal account of his upbringing and the experiences that had shaped his character and career. He told The Observer that revisiting his childhood while writing the memoir led him to reconsider the lasting effect of domestic abuse within his family and the feelings of inadequacy that he believed had subsequently helped drive his career.

The book was written in collaboration with Will Millard, a writer, broadcaster and presenter.

== Content ==
In the Hide is structured as a chronological memoir interspersed with accounts of Buchanan's encounters with wildlife. The title refers both to the hide from which a wildlife cameraman observes animals and to Buchanan's use of the natural world as a form of escape from difficulties in his personal life.

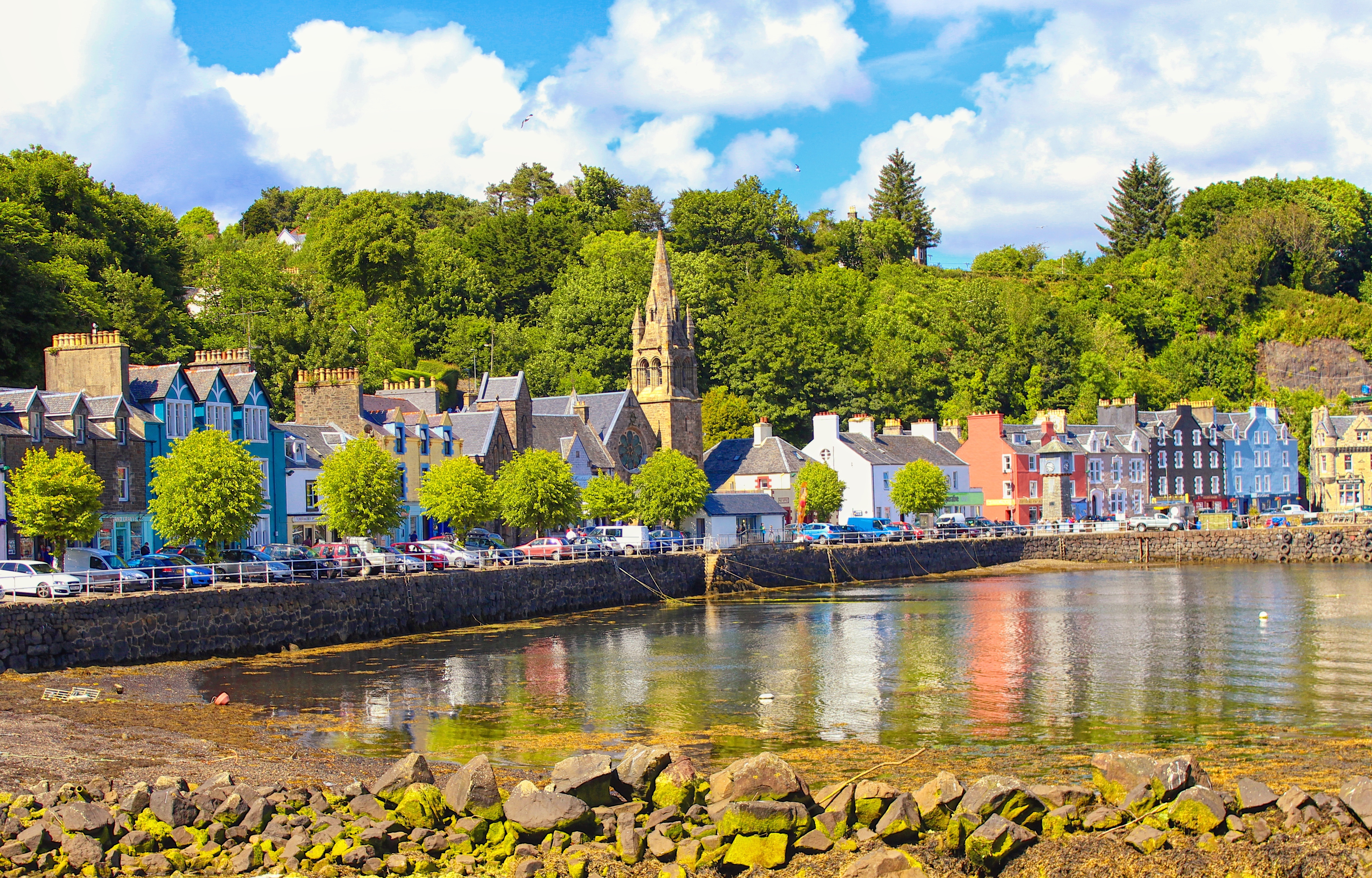
Tobermory on the Isle of Mull, where Buchanan spent much of his childhood.

The book opens with Buchanan's experience filming urban leopards in Mumbai for Planet Earth II, for which he spent four weeks working at night from a hide. It then returns to his childhood, including his early years on the Bellsmyre council estate in Dumbarton and his family's subsequent move to Tobermory on the Isle of Mull, following Buchanan's parents' divorce. Buchanan describes the freedom he found outdoors on Mull as well as the domestic violence experienced by the family during his childhood.

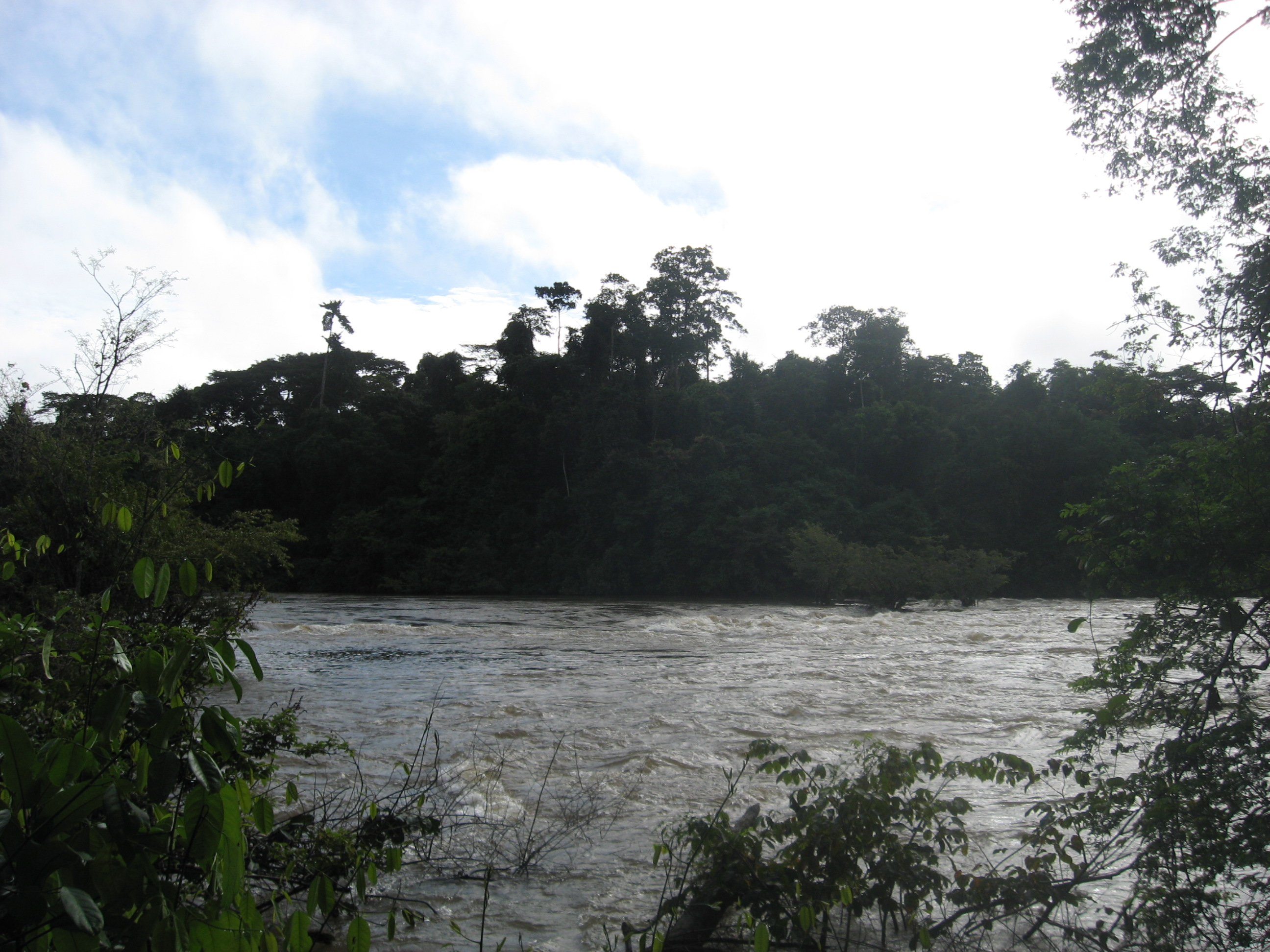
Tiwai Island in Sierra Leone, where Buchanan began his career as a camera assistant.

Later chapters recount Buchanan's entry into wildlife filmmaking after meeting cameraman Nick Gordon while working at the restaurant owned by Ann and Nick Gordon in Tobermory. At the age of seventeen, Buchanan left school to accompany Gordon to Sierra Leone as his camera assistant. They worked on Tiwai Island, a rainforest wildlife sanctuary in the Moa River, on Gordon's film Tiwai: Island of the Apes, which focused on the island's primates, particularly the critically endangered western chimpanzee. Buchanan describes the assignment as a steep practical apprenticeship in wildlife filmmaking, involving physically demanding work in the rainforest and long periods searching for and filming primates. In a 2025 interview with The Observer, he described the experience as the "making of me". The project came to an abrupt end in the spring of 1991 following the outbreak of the Sierra Leone Civil War. Buchanan and Gordon left Tiwai as the conflict spread into the region and travelled to Freetown, from where they eventually returned to Britain. Buchanan subsequently continued working with Gordon for some years on projects in West Africa and South America, beginning a career that took him to numerous locations around the world. His later recollections as a freelance cameraman include filming bears, wolves, big cats and other wildlife, as well as episodes from productions for which he later became known as a presenter.

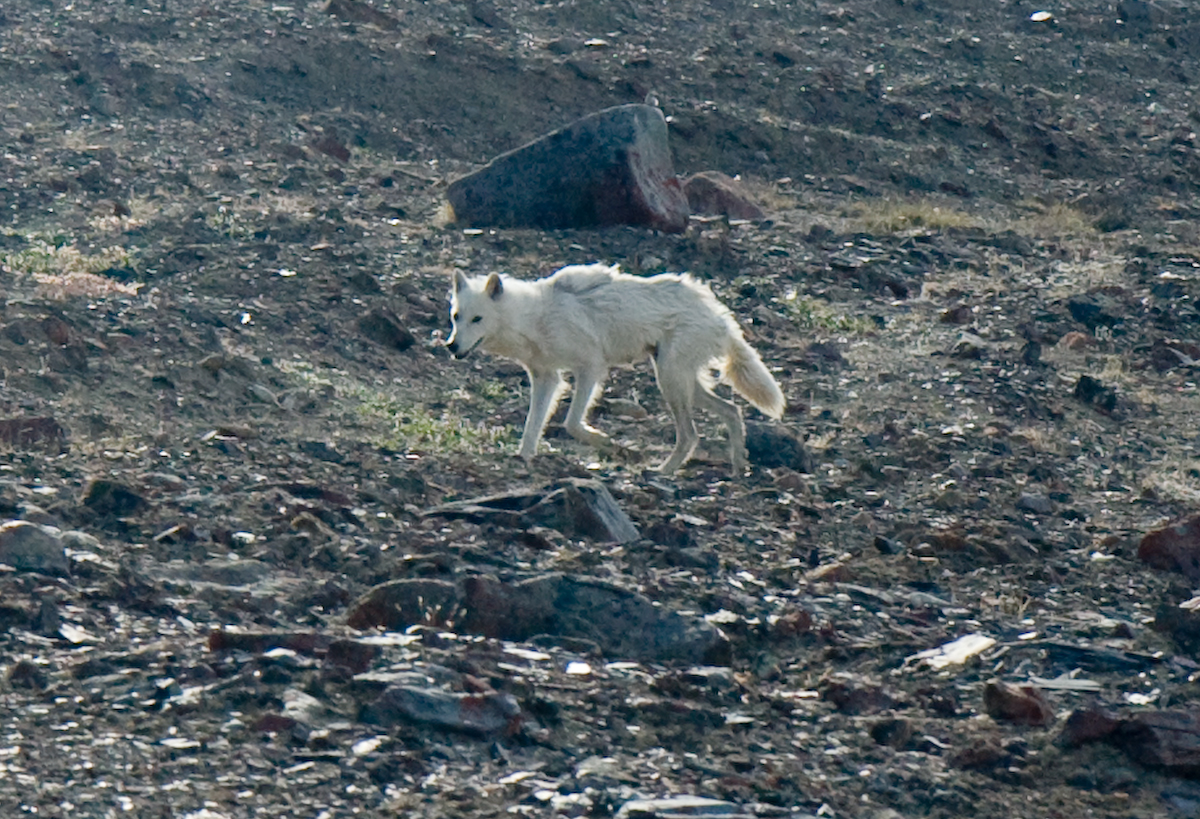
An Arctic wolf on Ellesmere Island, where Buchanan filmed Snow Wolf Family and Me in 2014.

The memoir devotes particular attention to Buchanan's encounters with wolves, including his work on the 2014 BBC series Snow Wolf Family and Me on Ellesmere Island. Buchanan contrasts the wolf's longstanding reputation as a ruthless predator with the curiosity, social behaviour and individual differences he observed among the Arctic wolves he followed, and discusses how wolves' behaviour towards people can be influenced by their previous experience of humans. The BBC described Snow Wolf Family and Me as an attempt to reveal the "true nature" of a widely feared predator. Buchanan has also attributed the recovery of wolves in parts of North America partly to changing attitudes towards wild animals and has emphasised their ecological role as apex predators.

The later part of the memoir deals increasingly with Buchanan's personal life and mental health. He writes about the pressures created by prolonged periods of travelling and filming, and about a breakdown in 2011 which led him to recognise that he had been suffering from depression. Buchanan describes subsequently reducing his workload and attempting to achieve a better balance between his career and his life with his family. In discussing the book in 2025, he characterised it as a story of his progression from a directionless schoolboy to a wildlife filmmaker, as well as a celebration of nature dealing with subjects including domestic abuse and depression.

== Publication ==
In the Hide was first published in hardback by Witness Books in February 2025. The first hardback edition has 320 pages and the ISBN 978-1-529-14426-0. Bookseller Foyles gives its publication date as 6 February 2025. E-book and audiobook editions were also released in 2025. A paperback edition was published on 9 July 2026 by Witness Books, with the ISBN 978-1-529-14427-7.

== Reception ==
Writing in The Observer, Tim Lewis noted that the book had originally been conceived as a more conventional adventure memoir but considered the more introspective work that resulted "much more engrossing, and surprising". Lewis particularly highlighted the memoir's examination of Buchanan's childhood experiences and the way in which feelings of inadequacy resulting from them had influenced his personality and career.

In Radio Times, Ed Grenby described In the Hide as a "beautifully written new memoir", and singled out Buchanan's account of filming urban leopards in Mumbai for Planet Earth II as a particularly suspenseful episode.

The book also received praise from figures associated with broadcasting and the natural world. Wildlife presenter Liz Bonnin described it as a "stunning and moving account", while Steve Backshall characterised Buchanan as a natural storyteller whose experience behind the camera had given him an instinctive understanding of animal behaviour. Alastair Campbell praised the combination of wildlife encounters with an account of Buchanan's personal struggles, describing the book as "terrific".

Commercially, the book became a Sunday Times bestseller. In the week ending 5 April 2025, it was ranked fifth in Waterstones' UK hardback non-fiction chart, as reproduced by The Irish News.

== See also ==
- Nature writing
- Wildlife photography
- Nature documentary
