= Gladys Kalema-Zikusoka =

Ugandan scientist

Dr Gladys Kalema-Zikusoka holding a copy of her memoir, "Walking with Gorillas: The Journey of an African Wildlife Vet", at the 2026 Kampala Writes Litfest where she was a speaker.

Dr. Gladys Kalema-Zikusoka (born 8 January 1970) is a Ugandan veterinarian and founder of Conservation Through Public Health, an organisation dedicated to the coexistence of humans, endangered mountain gorillas, and other animals in Africa. She is also a trustee of The Gorilla Organization.

Kalema-Zikusoka was Uganda's first wildlife veterinary officer and featured in the BBC documentary Gladys the African Vet. In 2009, she won the Whitley Gold Award for her conservation work. In December 2021, she was proclaimed a United Nations Environment Programme's Champion of the Earth for Science and Innovation for her work with the One Health initiative.

== Early life and education ==
While growing up in Kampala, Dr. Kalema-Zikusoka, at age 12, started a wildlife club at her school and organised trips to Queen Elizabeth National Park. Her professional studies began when she won a scholarship to study at the University of London Royal Veterinary College, graduating with a Bachelor of Veterinary Medicine. In 2003, she obtained a Master of Veterinary Medicine from North Carolina State University. She also holds a certificate in the management of non-profit organizations from Duke University. She earned a Master of Business Administration in 2016.

== Personal life ==
Kalema-Zikusoka is married to Lawrence Zikusoka, a technology entrepreneur and one of the co-founders of Conservation Through Public Health. They have two children.

She is the daughter of the late political leader and women's rights advocate Rhoda Kalema.

== Professional accomplishments ==
In 1996, when Dr. Kalema-Zikusoka was 25, she was appointed the veterinary officer for the Ugandan Wildlife Service, which later merged with Uganda's national parks to become the Uganda Wildlife Authority. She was the first person to hold that position. At the time, Bwindi gorillas numbered about 300. By 2018, the count had grown to approximately 460, moving the mountain gorilla from critically endangered status to endangered. She pioneered the first wildlife translocation to restock Uganda's national parks following years of poaching during Uganda's civil wars.

As part of her veterinary research, she identified parasite transmission from humans to mountain gorillas as a significant risk factor for gorillas.

Following her demonstration of pathways for human diseases to harm or kill gorillas, Gladys Kalema-Zikusoka, Lawrence Zikusoka, and Stephen Rubanga founded Conservation Through Public Health in 2003 to improve both human and ecological health in Africa. CTPH is a non-profit organisation based in Uganda and the USA that conducts programs that protect gorillas and other wildlife from human and livestock disease risk; that increase the local use of family planning; and that improve communication technologies to boost local development and to educate people about the environment. Kalema-Zikusoka is the CEO of the organisation.

In 2015, CTPH founded the award-winning social enterprise, Gorilla Conservation Coffee. Under this arrangement, the non-profit improves the livelihood of the surrounding community by assisting in getting international market prices for the community's Arabica coffee crop. With increased incomes, the community's illnesses and disease burden is reduced. Hence less disease is transferred to the resident gorillas. Also, a small fee is charged and retained by the farmers, whenever tourists traverse their gardens, when on gorilla treks through the community.

== Books ==
- Walking with Gorillas: The Journey of an African Wildlife Vet, foreword by Dr. Jane Goodall
- Gladys Working As A Wildlife Vet
- Audiobook Walking with Gorillas: The Journey of an African Wildlife Vet

== Awards and recognition ==
Dr. Kalema-Zikusoka has received a number of honours, awards, and other public recognition of her environmental and humanitarian work. In 2009, she won the Whitley Gold Award, the top prize awarded in what has been considered the "Green Oscars". In 2008, the San Diego Zoo gave her its Conservation-in-Action Award. In 2006, Kalema-Zikusoka was elected to an Ashoka Fellowship. In 2007, Seed Magazine named her one of their eight Revolutionary Minds in Science.

Dr. Kalema-Zikusoka was profiled in the BBC documentary Gladys the African Vet. She has also been featured in documentaries by National Geographic, Animal Planet, MNet and Uganda Television. She was chosen among nine international environmental leaders to write a letter to the next US president in Sierra Club magazine, November/December 2008 issue.

In 2018, Dr. Kalema-Zikusoka was awarded the EarthCare Award by the United States-based Sierra Club, in recognition of her "unique contribution to international environmental protection and conservation", as related to her work in environmental protection and co-existence between communities and mountain gorillas in Uganda. She received the award on 29 September 2018, at a ceremony held in Denver, Colorado, United States.

In December 2021, she was proclaimed the United Nations Environment Programme's Champion of the Earth for Science and Innovation.

In April 2022, Dr. Kalema-Zikusoka was awarded the Edinburgh Medal for her work improving the quality of life of people and wildlife to enable them to coexist in and around protected areas in Africa. She is a pioneer in community-led 'one health' approaches to conservation exploring and supporting the delicate interplay between humans and wildlife.

In November 2023, Dr. Kalema-Zikusoka was named to the BBC's 100 Women list as one of the world's inspiring and influential women. Silverback 10 Award — Uganda Tourism Association. 2024, Ekkula Sustainable Tourism Awards — Woman Champion of Sustainable Tourism, 2024 African Primatological Society — Lifetime Achievement Award, 2024, President's Mammal Society Award, UK.

Featured on 3 Oct 2026 (Full Episode) Africa Earth’s Wild Home presented by ROLEX and National Geographic. Narrated and executive produced by Academy Award nominee Wunmi Mosaku.

Dr. Gladys was nominated for 2027 Indianapolis Prize and is CNN Hero for 2026.

== Selected publications ==
- Kalema G. 1994. Letter entitled "Veterinarians and Zoological Medicine" to the Veterinary Record. The Veterinary Record, 135 (1).
- Nizeyi J. B., Mwebe R, Nanteza A, Cranfield M.R, Kalema G.R.N.N., Graczyk T. 1999. Cryptosporidium sp. and Giardia sp. Infections in mountain gorillas (Gorilla gorilla beringei) of the Bwindi Impenetrable National Park, Uganda. Journal Parasitology 85 (7). American Society of Parasitologists.
- Nizeye J. B., Innocent R. B., Erume J, Kalema G. R. N. N., Cranfield M. R. and Graczyk T. K. 2001. Campylobacteriosis, Salmonellosis, and Shigellosis in free-ranging human-habituated mountain gorillas in Uganda. Journal of Wildlife Diseases 37(2): 239–244.
- Graczyk T. K., DaSilva A. J., Cranfield M. R., Nizeye J. B., Kalema G. R and Pieniazek N. J. 2001. Cryptosporidium parvum genotype 2 infections in free-ranging mountain gorillas (Gorilla gorilla beringei) of the Bwindi Impenetrable National park, Uganda. Parasitology Research 87(5):368-70.
- Kalema-Zikusoka G, Kock R. A., Macfie E. J. 2002. Scabies in free-ranging mountain gorillas (Gorilla beringei beringei) in Bwindi Impenetrable National Park, Uganda. Veterinary Record 150(1):12-5.
- Kalema-Zikusoka G and Lowenstine L. 2001. Rectal prolapse in a free-ranging mountain gorilla (Gorilla beringei beringei): clinical presentation and surgical management. Journal of Zoo and Wildlife Medicine 32(4):509–513.
- Kalema-Zikusoka G, Horne W. A., Levine J. and Loomis M. R. 2003. Comparison of the cardiopulmonary effects of medetomidine-butorphanol-ketamine and medetomidine-butorphanol- midazolam in patas monkeys (Erthyrocebus patas). Journal of Zoo and Wildlife Medicine 34(1):47–52.
- Kalema-Zikusoka G, Rothman JM, Fox MT. 2005. Intestinal parasites and bacteria of mountain gorillas ( Gorilla beringei beringei) in Bwindi Impenetrable National Park, Uganda. Primates 46:59–63.
- Osofsky, Steven A., Richard A. Kock, Michael D. Kock, Gladys Kalema-Zikusoka, Richard Grahn, Tim Leyland, William. B. Karesh. 2005. Building support for Protected Ares using a One Health perspective In: Friends for Life, New partners in support of protected areas. Edited by Jeff McNeily. Published by IUCN, Species Survival Commission.
- Kalema-Zikusoka G, Bengis R, G., A. L. Michel and M. H. Woodford. 2005. A preliminary investigation of tuberculosis and other diseases in African buffalo (Syncerus caffer) in Queen Elizabeth National Park, Uganda. Onderstepoort Journal of Veterinary Research, 72:145–151.
- Gladys Kalema-Zikusoka, and Lynne Gaffikin. 2008. Sharing the Forest, Protecting Gorillas and Helping Families in Uganda. Focus, published by the Woodrow Wilson International Centre for International Scholars and USAID, Issue 17 October 2008.
- Gladys Kalema-Zikusoka. 2009. Lair of a Silverback. Wild Places. National Geographic Traveler, Issue October 2009.
- Fabien H.Leendertz and Gladys Kalema-Zikusoka. 2021. Vaccinate in biodiversity hotspots to protect people and wildlife from each other. Nature 591:369.
- Alexander Bowmer, Joseph Ssembatya, Mark Okot, Richard Bagyenyi, Stephen Venny Rubanga, Gladys Kalema-Zikusoka. 2022. Determining the acceptability of a novel One Health vaccine for Rift Valley Fever prior to phase II/III clinical trials in Uganda.
- Ryoma Otsuka, Gladys Kalema-Zikusoka, Gen Yamakoshi, Kodzue Kinoshita. 2026. Tourism impacts on faecal glucocorticoid metabolites of free-ranging mountain gorillas in Bwindi Impenetrable National Park, Uganda
