= The Gorilla Organization =

UK-based non-profit organization

The Gorilla Organization is a UK-based charity, working in Africa for the conservation and protection of endangered mountain gorillas.

== Background ==
In 1978, primatologist and conservationist Dian Fossey founded The Digit Fund to finance anti-poaching patrols. It was named in memory of Fossey's favourite gorilla, Digit.

Amid complex disputes about the best use of funds (Fossey felt international organizations' donations were mistakenly aimed at promoting tourism and often ended up with corrupt park officials), she lost control of British money to the Fauna Preservation Society's "Mountain Gorilla Fund", although she managed to keep control of the Digit Fund in the US.

After she was murdered, the Digit Fund was renamed the Dian Fossey Gorilla Fund and remained headquartered in the UK until the summer of 2006, when the UK and US branches split due to differences in the ways charities operate in the two countries. The UK organization was briefly renamed the Dian Fossey Gorilla Fund Europe then assumed its current name of The Gorilla Organization, (gorillas.org) while the US side became the Dian Fossey Gorilla Fund International (gorillafund.org).

== Activities ==
Initially, Fossey financed patrols to destroy poachers' traps. Now, the organization's activities are more widespread and holistic, covering all three countries bordering the Virunga Mountains (Rwanda, Uganda and the Democratic Republic of Congo, DRC). They include reforestation, economic development, organic farming, eco-guards (rangers), research, community education projects and collaboration with Gladys Kalema-Zikusoka's Conservation Through Public Health and its "Gorilla Conservation Coffee" scheme (Dr Gladys is a Gorilla Organization trustee, alongside Dian Fossey's former research assistant Ian Redmond OBE). In addition to public fundraising via events such as the Great Gorilla Run and London Marathon (where "Mr Gorilla" Tom Harrison crawled the whole route, taking a week but raising £50,000), it has managed to attract corporate sponsorship from companies such as Gorilla Glue, Gorilla Spirits, and That Gorilla Brand. It also has numerous high-profile patrons, including Baroness Chalker of Wallasey, Gordon Buchanan, Richard Dawkins, Leonardo DiCaprio, Daryl Hannah, Nathan Myhrvold and Stanley Johnson.
