= Kevin Govender =

South African director

Kevin Govender is the director of the Office of Astronomy for Development and the joint recipient of the Edinburgh Medal together with the International Astronomical Union (IAU). The award was presented in recognition of the creation and practical establishment of the IAU Office of Astronomy for Development.

He was born in South Africa, and was trained as an experimental nuclear physicist. He held the post of Manager of the Southern African Large Telescope's Collateral Benefits Programme at the South African Astronomical Observatory, and was appointed director of the Office of Astronomy for Development in 2011.
