= Office of Astronomy for Development =

The Office of Astronomy for Development
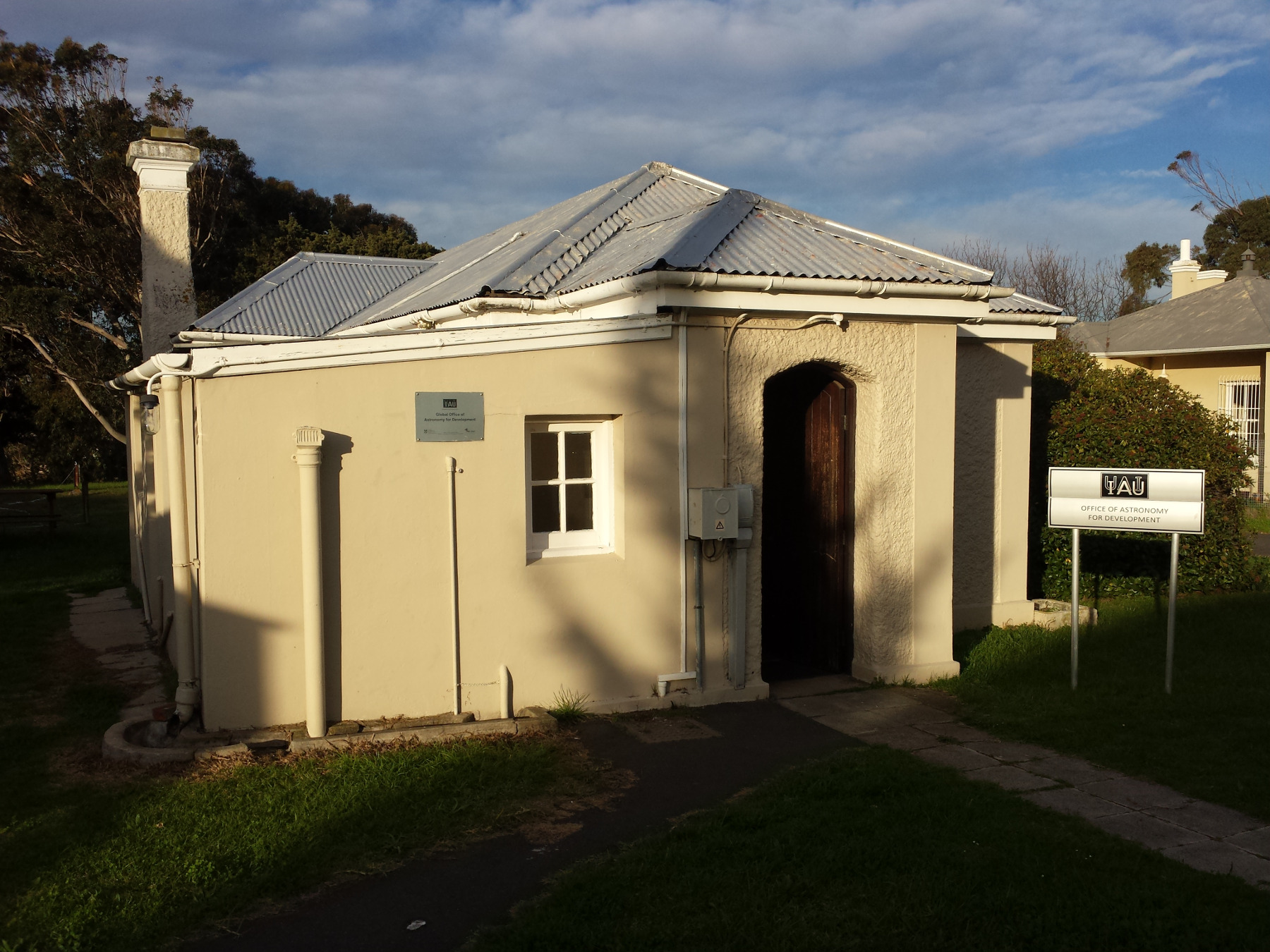
- The OAD main office at the SAAO observatory grounds.
- Established: April 2011
- Location: Headquarters in Observatory, Cape Town
- Coordinates: Headquarters: 33.935486°S 18.478017°E
- Main organ: International Astronomical Union, National Research Foundation of South Africa
- Website: www.astro4dev.org

The Office of Astronomy for Development (OAD) is an office of the International Astronomical Union (IAU) established in 2011 to further the use of astronomy as a tool for economic development.

== Description ==
The OAD is jointly funded by the International Astronomical Union and the National Research Foundation of South Africa.

The office consists of eleven regional offices located in Armenia, China, Colombia, Ethiopia, Jordan, Nigeria, Portugal, Thailand, the Netherlands, United States, and Zambia which have similar objectives to the OAD but with regional focus.

The OAD annually issues a call for proposals to fund projects which use Astronomy as a tool to address an issue related to sustainable development. The mission of the OAD is to help further the use of astronomy as a tool for development by mobilizing the human and financial resources necessary in order to realize the field's scientific, technological and cultural benefits to society.

== History ==
The OAD was established by the IAU in 2011, with its headquarters on the campus of the South African Astronomical Observatory (SAAO) in Cape Town. The opening ceremony on 16 April 2011 was attended by Naledi Pandor, the South African Minister of Science and Technology.

In 2016, the IAU together with the OAD director Kevin Govender was awarded the Edinburgh Medal for "furthering education and technological capacity worldwide through the inspirational science of astronomy".

As of 2023, the OAD had administered a total of €1.1 Million in IAU grant funds. These funds have been awarded to 215 projects that reached over 100 countries across the world.

== See also ==
- List of astronomical societies
