= Life in the Snow =

- Genre: Nature documentary
- Directed by: Mark Wheeler; Sally Thomson
- Narrated by: Gordon Buchanan
- Country of origin: United Kingdom
- Original language: English
- No. of episodes: 1

Production
- Executive producer: Roger Webb
- Production location: Worldwide
- Running time: 58 minutes
- Production company: BBC Natural History Unit

Original release
- Network: BBC One
- Release: 29 December 2016

Life in the Snow is a 2016 British television show created by the BBC Natural History Unit.

== Episodes ==
| No. | Title | Original release date |
|---|---|---|
| 1 | "Life in the Snow" | 29 December 2016 |
Gordon Buchanan meets the animals who live in nature's winter wonderlands, from the polar bear mother helping her cubs to the owl searching for food.
