= Edinburgh Medal =

- Description: Scientific award recognizing contributions to science and technology that significantly benefit the understanding and well-being of humanity
- Location: Edinburgh
- Country: Scotland, United Kingdom
- Presented by: City of Edinburgh Council (presented at the Edinburgh International Science Festival)
- Website: https://www.sciencefestival.co.uk/edinburgh-medal

The Edinburgh Medal is a scientific medal given at the Edinburgh International Science Festival since 1989. The Edinburgh Medal is an award given each year to recognise contributions to science and technology and whose professional achievements have made a significant contribution to the understanding and well-being of humanity.

== History and presentation ==
The award was instituted by the City of Edinburgh Council in 1988 and has been presented at the Edinburgh International Science Festival since 1989. Each year the recipient attends an awards ceremony and delivers an address at the Festival.

== Medallists ==
In 2022, Uganda's first wildlife veterinarian, Dr. Gladys Kalema-Zikusoka and Founder and CEO of Conservation Through Public Health and Gorilla Conservation Coffee received this year’s Edinburgh Medal award for her community-led wildlife conservation work, improving the quality of life of people and wildlife to enable them to coexist in and around protected areas in Africa.

Professor Peter Piot, director of the London School of Hygiene and Tropical Medicine, was presented the award in 2017. While in Edinburgh to receive the award, Prof Piot delivered an address that discussed epidemics in a global context and focused on obesity.

In 2016, Edinburgh’s Lord Provost presented the award to Kevin Govender and the International Astronomical Union (IAU). The award was presented in recognition of the creation and practical establishment of the IAU Office of Astronomy for Development, which integrates the pursuit of scientific knowledge with social development for and with those most in need.

Philosopher Mary Midgley was awarded the Edinburgh Medal at the 2015 Edinburgh International Science Festival.

Prof Mary Abukutsa-Onyango, professor of horticulture at Jomo Kenyatta University of Agriculture and Technology received the 2014 Edinburgh Medal in recognition of her two decades of research on sustainable production and utilization of leafy African indigenous vegetables to tackle malnutrition and obesity as well as empower rural communities in Kenya.

In 2013, the 25th anniversary of the Edinburgh Medal and the Edinburgh International Science Festival, the Medal was awarded jointly for the first time in its history to Professor Peter Higgs and CERN. It was presented in a ceremony at Edinburgh’s Signet Library to Professor Higgs and Professor Rolf-Dieter Heuer, Director General of CERN who collected the medal on behalf of the institution.

US climate change scientist Dr James Hansen received the award in 2012. In 2011 the Edinburgh Medal was awarded to Professor Carl Djerassi, an American Scientist who invented the contraceptive pill.

== List of medallists ==
| Year | Name |
|---|---|
| 1989 | Abdus Salam |
| 1990 | Stephen J. Gould |
| 1991 | Jane Goodall |
| 1992 | Heinz Wolff |
| 1993 | Wangari Maathai |
| 1994 | Manuel Pattarroya |
| 1995 | Sir John Crofton |
| 1996 | Richard Levins |
| 1997 | Amartya Sen |
| 1998 | Sir David Attenborough |
| 1999 | Jocelyn Bell Burnell |
| 2000 | Lynn Margulis |
| 2001 | Sir John Sulston |
| 2002 | Lise Kingo |
| 2003 | Wang Sung |
| 2004 | Steven Rose |
| 2005 | Colin Blakemore |
| 2006 | James Lovelock |
| 2007 | Richard Horton |
| 2008 | Chris Rapley |
| 2009 | Jonathan Beckwith |
| 2010 | Sir Alec Jeffreys |
| 2011 | Carl Djerassi |
| 2012 | James Hansen |
| 2013 | Peter Higgs and CERN |
| 2014 | Mary Abukutsa-Onyango |
| 2015 | Mary Midgely |
| 2016 | Kevin Govender and the International Astronomical Union |
| 2017 | Peter Piot |
| 2018 | Cordelia Fine |
| 2019 | Christiana Figueres |
| 2020 | Sunita Narain |
| 2021 | Heidi Larson |
| 2022 | Dr. Gladys Kalema-Zikusoka |
| 2023 | Marion Nestle |
| 2024 | Mario Negri Institute for Pharmacological Research |
| 2025 | Johan Rockström |
| 2026 | Kay Redfield Jamison |
