= Ian Redmond =

British biologist

Ian Redmond OBE FZS FLS
- Born: Ian Michael Redmond; 11 April 1954 (age 72); Malaysia
- Education: Keele University
- Occupations: Field biologist; Conservationist
- Known for: Work with gorillas and elephants

Ian Michael Redmond OBE FZS FLS (born 11 April 1954) is a tropical field biologist and conservationist. Renowned for his work with mountain gorillas and elephants, Redmond has been involved in more than 50 documentaries on the subject for, among others, the BBC, National Geographic and the Discovery Channel. Redmond was also involved in the 1988 film Gorillas in the Mist, spending some time with Sigourney Weaver so she could better understand her character.

As a junior researcher working with Dian Fossey, he was involved in the filming of David Attenborough's famous encounter with a group of mountain gorillas in her sanctuary in Rwanda. He recalled the event in a BBC tribute programme marking Attenborough's 90th birthday.

When Dian's favourite gorilla Digit was killed in 1978, it was Ian who found the body. He subsequently became chairman and trustee of The Gorilla Organization (originally known as the Digit Fund, later the Dian Fossey Gorilla Fund, then Dian Fossey Gorilla Fund Europe), and took part in multiple Great Gorilla Run fundraising events for this charity, walking 8 km on his knuckles (as gorillas do).

Similarly to Dian's Digit Fund, Ian set up the African Elephant Fund after he discovered the body of Charles, an underground elephant he had named. The African Ele-Fund was known for the 1989 Elefriends campaign to ban the ivory trade.

He was Ambassador for the 2009 United Nations 'Year of the Gorilla', from 2020-2024 was Ambassador for the UN's Convention on the Conservation of Migratory Species of Wild Animals., and is currently Ambassador for Virtual Ecotourism.

He has acted as consultant/advisor to the Born Free Foundation, International Fund for Animal Welfare, United Nations Environment Programme (UNEP), Food and Agriculture Organization (FAO), and Orangutan Foundation International.

He established (and chairs) the Ape Alliance, and previously founded the UK Rhino Group (a coalition of 26 conservation organizations which staged a 'Rhino May Day' on 8 May 1999).

He also helped launch the UNEP/UNESCO Great Apes Survival Partnership (GRASP) in 2001 and was its Chief Consultant and Envoy until 2012. More recently he co-founded Rebalance Earth, a capital investment manager treating nature as investible infrastructure.

== Early life and family ==
Redmond was born in Malaysia, moving to Beverley, East Riding of Yorkshire, England aged five to live with his mother. It was in Beverley where his love of animals led to his becoming a member of the Beverley and Hull Naturalist Society. Redmond attended Keele University, studying Biology and Psychology.

Redmond is married with twin sons, Matthew and Benjamin. He has two brothers, Tom, a French horn player, and Timothy, a conductor.

== Awards and honours ==
His work on behalf of animals was recognized in 1996 with the presentation of the Performing Animal Welfare Society (PAWS) Humane Achievement Award, at a ceremony in Hollywood.

He was appointed OBE in the Queen’s Birthday Honours in 2006.

In 2011, he was awarded an honorary degree from Oxford Brookes University for his conservation work.

In 2013 he received a Lifetime Achievement Award at the New York Wildlife Conservation Film Festival, and also the IFAW Animal Action Award for Conservation.

== Publications ==
- The Primate Family Tree: The Amazing Diversity of Our Closest Relatives (with an introduction by Jane Goodall; also released as Primates of the World) ISBN 978-1554073788
- Gorilla (Eyewitness Books) ISBN 978-0679873327
- Elephant (Eyewitness Books) ISBN 978-0789458728
- Gorilla, Monkey & Ape (Eyewitness Books) ISBN 978-0789460363
- Gorillas (Wildlife at Risk) ISBN 978-0531183953
- Elephants (Wildlife at Risk) ISBN 978-0531183540
- Digit and the Gorillas of Rwanda ISBN 978-0224028769
- Great Apes ISBN 9781842157145
- The Elephant Book ISBN 978-0763616342
- The Elephant in the Bush ISBN 978-0836801163
- The World of Elephants ISBN 978-0836801415
- Sauvons Les Éléphants ISBN 978-2070568468
- Gorilas ISBN 9788437223230
- Gorilas (Enciclopédia Visual #38) ISBN 972-22-1747-X
- Elephants Underground & Mountain Gorillas (ASIN B01MYST4VR), pub. Audubon Naturalist Society & Friends of the Zoo & Smithsonian
