= William Ian Beardmore Beveridge =

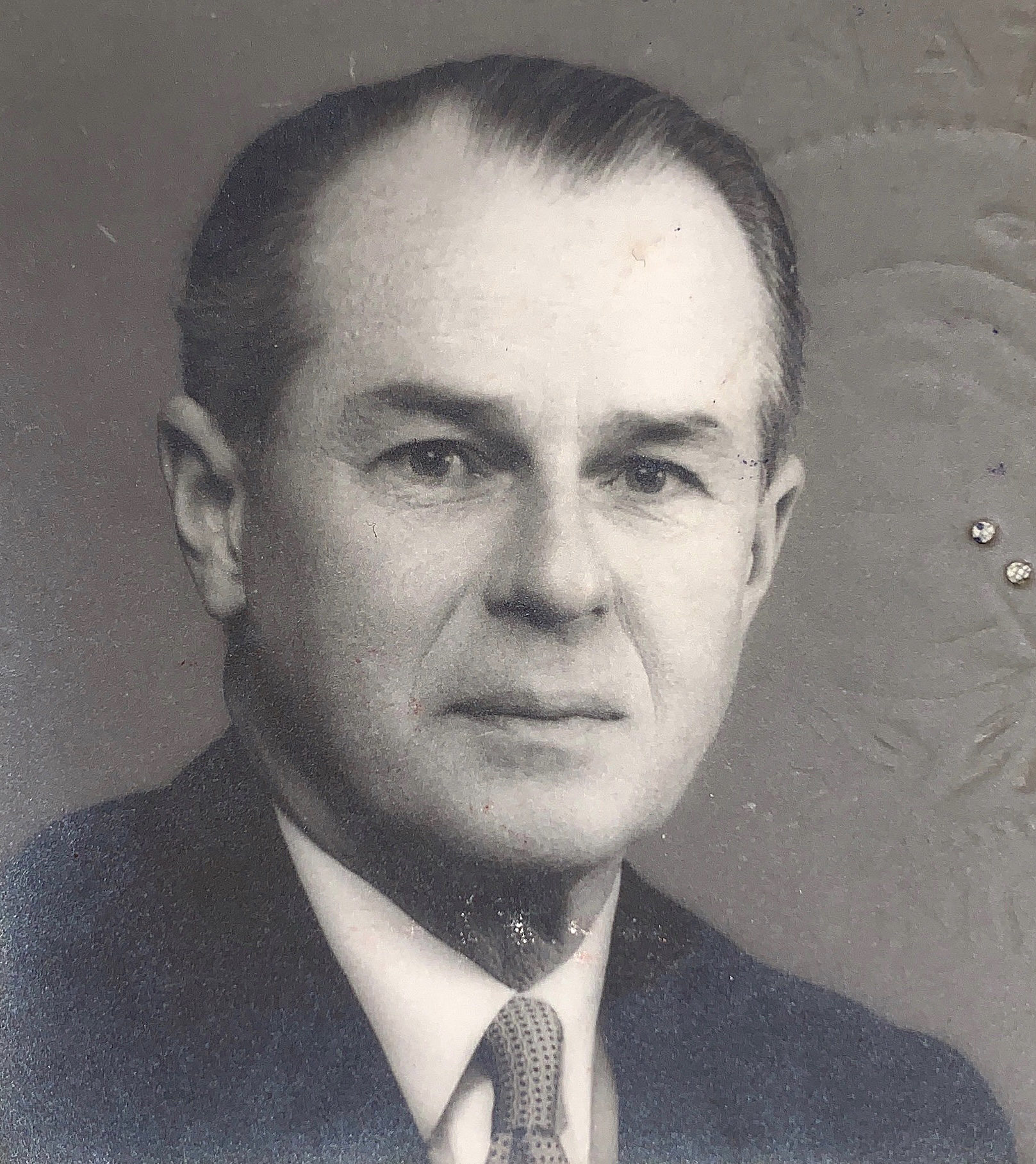
- Born: 23 April 1908; Junee, New South Wales, Australia
- Died: 14 August 2006 (aged 98)

William Ian Beardmore (WIB) Beveridge (1908–2006) was an Australian animal pathologist and director of the Institute of Animal Pathology, University of Cambridge. He was born on 23 April 1908 in Junee, New South Wales, Australia, and died on 14 August 2006. He was the author of The Art of Scientific Investigation in 1957, and Influenza, the Last Great Plague, in 1977.

"In 1937 Beveridge was awarded a Commonwealth Fellowship and went with his first wife, Patricia, and infant son John, to work in the Rockefeller Institute in New York City, studying swine influenza virus, on which he worked with Richard Shope. They showed that it was serologically identical with the agent that caused the 1918-19 flu pandemic."

"His research at Cambridge focused on pneumonia in pigs, maternal and neonatal behavior of pigs, and influenza in horses. His major commitment to international affairs was sparked by his co-operation with Martin M. Kaplan, the chief of the Veterinary Public Health Unit of the World Health Organization. Together they developed and edited an international nomenclature and classification of cancers of domestic animals, which occupied the whole of the 1974 and 1976 volumes of the Bulletin of the World Health Organization. Beveridge was chairman of the World Veterinary Association for 18 years (1957-75) and president at the congresses it held every four years."

Beveridge was director Cambridge's Department of Animal Pathology, where he was Stephen Boyden's PhD supervisor.
