= Gordon Buchanan =

Scottish filmmaker and broadcaster (born 1972)

Gordon Buchanan MBE
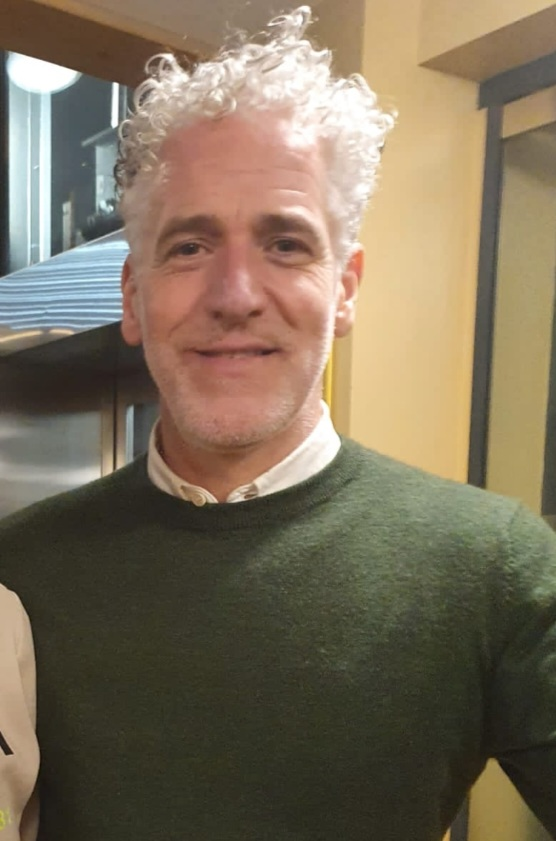
- Buchanan in March 2023.
- Born: Gordon John Buchanan; 10 April 1972 (age 54); Dumbarton, Scotland
- Education: University of Stirling
- Occupations: Wildlife cameraman; filmmaker; presenter
- Years active: 1989–present
- Spouse: Wendy Buchanan
- Children: 2

Gordon John Buchanan MBE (born 10 April 1972) is a Scottish wildlife cameraman, filmmaker and presenter. His work includes the nature documentaries Tribes, Predators & Me, The Bear Family & Me, The Polar Bear Family & Me and Life in the Snow.

== Early life ==
Buchanan was born in Alexandria, West Dunbartonshire, Scotland, on 10 April 1972 and brought up on the Isle of Mull. As a child, Buchanan was a fan of David Attenborough's television programmes and Survival, a nature programme.

== Career ==
Buchanan's career in wildlife photography has yielded a number of documentaries, shot variously in Asia (especially the Indian Subcontinent), Latin America, Europe, and Africa. His career began when Survival cameraman Nick Gordon, whose wife owned the restaurant Buchanan was working in, invited Buchanan to become his camera assistant for a project he was completing in Sierra Leone. Buchanan was there for almost a year before the project had to be abandoned due to the danger presented by the civil unrest in the country. He left school to join Nick Gordon on this trip and continued to work with him on his next projects in Venezuela and Brazil.

Buchanan began to work independently in 1995, and in time became known for his films of big cats and worked on Big Cat Diary. He also returned to his home on the Isle of Mull to film white tailed eagles. The resulting 2005 Natural World episode, "Eagle Island", received good reviews. (It was broadcast on 3 May 2009 as "Eagles of Mull" on Nature.) He also filmed the Natural World episode "Leopards of Yala".

Buchanan has filmed foxes for Springwatch and Autumnwatch in Glasgow, where he currently lives. His coverage of grey seal pups was identified as one of the highlights of the programme. He then returned for Springwatch 2008 completing a series on people with amazing wildlife stories including a one-off Springwatch special. In Autumnwatch 2008 he travelled to the Farne Islands to film grey seal pups again. In early 2009, Buchanan worked with the BBC, filming the Lost Land of the Volcano. Filming took place during the month of February 2009, around Papua New Guinea, and its islands. He also filmed the Lost Land of the Tiger and Lost Land of the Jaguar, which followed a similar format.

In December 2010, a documentary called The Bear Family and Me aired on the BBC. It showed the year which Buchanan spent with black bears in the U.S. state of Minnesota. In January 2013, Buchanan presented and partially filmed The Polar Bear Family & Me for the BBC, covering the life of a polar bear and her cubs in the spring, summer, and autumn.

In December 2014, another ...& Me two-part series was broadcast on BBC Two. For this series, The Snow Wolf Family & Me, Buchanan visited Ellesmere Island in Canada in both summer and autumn. Here he followed a wolf pack as they raised their cubs over the course of a year. This was shortly followed, in February 2015, by Super Cute Animals, a 60-minute documentary.

In 2015, he presented the documentary Leopard in the City at Sanjay Gandhi National Park in the Borivli section of northern Mumbai in India, on the "urban leopards" of the area, which prey almost entirely on stray dogs. He also continued to film his ‘…And Me’ series, this time focusing on Gorillas, which was again broadcast on the BBC. He has since become a patron of The Gorilla Organization.

2016 saw him appear in Elephant Family and Me, in which he visited Africa to get a better understanding of how a family of elephants live and communicate with each other. He also narrated a one-off programme called Life in the Snow, before again working with polar bears, this time looking at how they interact with the local human population in Life in Polar Bear Town.

From 2016 to 2017, he filmed two series of Tribes, Predators and Me. During these six episodes he spent time with several groups of people who lived alongside dangerous animals, such as hyenas and crocodiles. He continued the series with The Reindeer Family and Me, which saw him follow a herd of Reindeer as they journeyed on their migration. He also filmed a six-part series titled '‘Into the Wild’', in which he took six famous people to nature hotspots around the UK to get a glimpse of the local wildlife. 2018 saw Buchanan present Animals with Cameras in which he used new camera techniques to get a better insight into their lives. Following this, he filmed Grizzly Bear Cubs and Me, where he helps to rehabilitate young bears in order to help them return to the wild.

In 2019, continuing to present nature programmes on the BBC, Buchanan travelled around the equator to present the series Equator from the Air. He also filmed and presented Snow Cats and Me, in which he helped rehabilitate lynx so that they could return to the wild. 2020 saw him return to Springwatch once again as a guest presenter, filming live from his native Scotland. He ended the with yet another …And Me series, this time following cheetahs in the wild in Africa.

In 2021, it was announced that he would front a second series of Animals with Cameras.

In November 2021, it was confirmed that Buchanan would tour the UK (30 Years in the Wild) in February 2022.

In April 2022, the first two episodes of a long-running programme Our Changing Planet premiered on the BBC, presented by Buchanan along with Liz Bonnin, Ella Al-Shamahi, Chris Packham, Ade Adepitan and Steve Backshall.

In February 2025, Buchanan published his first book, In the Hide: How the Natural World Saved My Life, a memoir written with broadcaster and author Will Millard. Published by Witness Books, the book combines accounts of Buchanan's career as a wildlife cameraman with his childhood in Dumbarton and on the Isle of Mull, and describes the role of the natural world as a source of refuge and solace during difficult periods of his life.

== Awards and patronages ==
In June 2013, Buchanan was granted an honorary doctorate by the University of Stirling.

He won the Glenfiddich Spirit of Scotland award in the environment category in the same year.

In 2013, Buchanan became a patron of Trees for Life, a conservation charity working to restore the Caledonian Forest in the Highlands of Scotland. He became an ambassador for the Scottish Wildlife Trust the following year.

Buchanan was appointed Member of the Order of the British Empire (MBE) in the 2020 New Year Honours for services to conservation and wildlife film-making.

== Personal life ==
Buchanan frequently mentions missing his family within his shows. The Bear Family & Me includes a segment in which his wife and their two children visit him.

He has an interest in whisky.

== Documentaries ==
- Wild Scotland (2002)
- Expedition Borneo (2006)
- Amba the Russian Tiger (2008)
- Lost Land of the Jaguar (2008)
- Lost Land of the Volcano (2009)
- Snow Watch (2010)
- Lost Land of the Tiger (2011)
- The Bear Family & Me (2011)
- Maneater Manhunt (2012)
- Land of the Lost Wolves (2012)
- The Polar Bear Family & Me (2013)
- Snow Wolf Family & Me (2014)
- Gorilla Family & Me (2015)
- Leopard in the City (2015)
- Elephant Family & Me (2016)
- Into the Wild (2016)
- Life in the Snow (2016)
- Life in Polar Bear Town (2016)
- Tribes, Predators & Me (2016–2017)
- The Reindeer Family & Me (2017)
- Animals with Cameras (Series 1) (2018)
- Grizzly Bear Cubs and Me (2018)
- Equator from the Air (2019)
- Snow Cats and Me (2019)
- The Cheetah Family and Me (2020)
- Animals with Cameras (Series 2) (2021)
- Our Wild Adventures (2021)
- Our Changing Planet (2022)
- Snow Dogs: Into The Wild (2022)
- Big Cats 24/7 (2024)
- My Epic Camel Adventure with Gordon Buchanan (2024)
- Gordon Buchanan: Wild Horses and Me (2025)
