= Stephen Boyden =

British-Australian scientist and writer (1925–2025)

Stephen Vickers Boyden AM (8 February 1925 – 26 December 2025) was a British-Australian scientist and writer. He was a Professor Emeritus at the Australian National University (ANU) and is widely recognised for pioneering the field of immunology and human ecology.

== Life and career ==
Stephen Vickers Boyden was born in Croydon, England on 8 February 1925, and attended the Royal Veterinary College in London. He then worked at the University of Cambridge and the Rockefeller Institute in New York. He received a PhD in Immunology from the University of Cambridge in 1951. Ian Beveridge was his supervisor.

Early in his career, Stephen made significant breakthroughs in immunology. In 1951, he introduced the "tanned red cell" method of titrating antibodies, which is the most sensitive and possibly the most widely used method of titrating antibodies to proteins.

He worked for a year at the Pasteur Institute in Paris with Pierre Grabar. He also lived in Copenhagen for eight years where he worked for the World Health Organization, becoming chief of the Tuberculosis Immunisation Research Centre. Boyden emigrated to Australia in 1959 From 1960 He worked at John Curtin School of Medical Research at the Australian National University in Canberra. He was the inventor of the Boyden Chamber, a critical laboratory tool used to study chemotaxis. For his contributions to immunology, Boyden was named a Fellow of the Australian Academy of Science in 1966. In the 1970s, he directed the Hong Kong Human Ecology Program, the world’s first comprehensive ecological study of a major city.

Boyden developed the concept of biohistory, which examines the interplay between biological and cultural processes throughout human history to understand modern environmental challenges. He estimated that the ecological impact of humans since our early history has multiplied ten-thousand-fold, mostly in the last hundred years.

In 2024 Richard Horton wrote in The Lancet advocating for the biorenaissance written about by Boyden.

Boyden died in Canberra, Australia on 26 December 2025, at the age of 100.

== Publications ==
Boyden authored over 10 books focused on the sustainability of human civilisation and the environment, including:

- A Biorenaissance: The Human Place in Nature, Past, Present and Future (2023) – His most recent work, published at age 98, which advocates for a radical cultural transformation to achieve sustainability.
- The Bionarrative: The story of life and hope for the future (2016) Australian National University Press
- The Biology of Civilisation (2004) – Analyzes human culture as a powerful force within natural ecosystems.
- Western Civilization in Biological Perspective: Patterns in Biohistory (1987) – Explores the biological roots of modern societal health and ecological impact.

== Career highlights and honors ==
- Fellow of the Australian Academy of Science: Elected in 1966, he was the Academy’s oldest living Fellow as of 2025.
- Member of the Order of Australia (AM): Awarded in 1998 for his services to human ecology.
- UNESCO Consultant: Served as a consultant on urban ecology for the Man and the Biosphere Programme (1973–1989).
- Founder: Established the Nature and Society Forum in Canberra to promote community involvement in environmental well-being.
