= The Bear Family & Me =

2011 British TV series

- Genre: Nature documentary
- Directed by: Jonny Young
- Presented by: Gordon Buchanan
- Narrated by: Gordon Buchanan
- Composer: Barnaby Taylor
- Country of origin: United Kingdom
- Original language: English
- No. of series: 1
- No. of episodes: 3

Production
- Executive producer: Tim Martin
- Producer: Ted Oakes
- Production locations: Minnesota; North America
- Running time: 60 minutes
- Production company: BBC Natural History Unit

Original release
- Network: BBC Two; BBC HD
- Release: 3 January – 5 January 2011

The Bear Family & Me is a three-part nature documentary series produced by the BBC Natural History Unit. It follows wildlife cameraman Gordon Buchanan as he spends a year with a family of wild black bears, under the guidance of biologists Lynn Rogers and Sue Mansfield of the North American Bear Centre.

== Episodes ==
| No. | Title | Original release date | UK viewers (millions) |
|---|---|---|---|
| 1 | "Spring" | 3 January 2011 | 2.43 |
Gordon arrives in the forests of Minnesota in spring just as the bears are coming out of their dens. Before he can start filming he faces a major challenge – to earn the bears' trust. He must overcome his own fear. But once he meets Lily, an easy-going young mother bear and her cub Hope, Gordon is smitten.
| 2 | "Summer" | 4 January 2011 | 2.86 |
As summer arrives, Gordon returns to Minnesota and discovers that the tiny bear cub 'Hope' has been abandoned by her mother. He tracks down the starving cub, but her life hangs in the balance and Gordon steps in to try keep Hope alive. As he follows every twist and turn of the bears' lives we witness a wild bear family from the inside, closer than we’ve ever seen before.
| 3 | "Autumn" | 5 January 2011 | 2.87 |
Gordon returns in early Autumn to discover that the life of abandoned bear cub, Hope, has taken an unexpected turn. The bear family are in danger as hunters move into the forest. Gordon’s role changes from cameraman to body guard as he walks with the bears to try to keep them safe. Will Lily and Hope survive hunting season to den safely for the winter?
