= The Polar Bear Family & Me =

- Genre: Nature documentary
- Directed by: Saritha Wilkinson
- Presented by: Gordon Buchanan
- Narrated by: Gordon Buchanan
- Composer: Brett Aplin
- Country of origin: United Kingdom
- Original language: English
- No. of series: 1
- No. of episodes: 3

Production
- Executive producer: Tim Martin
- Producer: Ted Oakes
- Production locations: Svalbard, Norway; Arctic
- Running time: 60 minutes
- Production company: BBC Natural History Unit

Original release
- Network: BBC Two; BBC HD
- Release: 7 January – 10 January 2013

The Polar Bear Family & Me is a three-part nature documentary series produced by the BBC Natural History Unit. It follows wildlife cameraman Gordon Buchanan as he spends a year with a family of wild polar bears, under the guidance of his biologist Jason Roberts, the polar expertise of the Antarctic region and Svalbard near Norwegian archipelago of the Arctic Ocean.

The series was controversial for its use of a perspex box, from within which Buchanan filmed polar bears up close. It was reported that Roberts was notified by Norwegian authorities that he could be fined for "disturbing" the bears.

== Episodes ==
| No. | Title | Directed by | Original release date |
|---|---|---|---|
| 1 | "Spring" | Saritha Wilkinson | 7 January 2013 |
| 2 | "Summer" | Saritha Wilkinson | 8 January 2013 |
| 3 | "Autumn" | Saritha Wilkinson | 10 January 2013 |
