= Keith Willett =

British orthopaedic surgeon

Sir Keith Malcolm Willett CBE is Professor of Orthopaedic Trauma Surgery at the University of Oxford.

He trained in medicine at Charing Cross Hospital Medical School. He is very critical of the training he received: “I vowed never to let my trainees learn trauma surgery the way I had and that injured patients should receive far better care than I had witnessed”. He pointed out at that time that “Senior people primarily work normal office hours. But a large number of severely injured people arrive when most of the senior people are not in the hospital".

An NHS consultant surgeon for more than 20 years, he has wide experience of trauma care, service transformation and healthcare management. He has taught surgery and clinical leadership in the NHS and internationally.

In 2003, he founded the Kadoorie Centre for Critical Care Research and Education focusing on the treatment of critically ill and injured patients. In 2015, IMPS, a children’s safety charity he launched, celebrated 20 years and over 250,000 children trained in risk awareness, first aid and life support.

He was the co-founder of the then unique 24-hour consultant-resident Oxford Trauma Service at the John Radcliffe Hospital in Oxford in 1994. Building on that model, in 2009 he was appointed the first National Clinical Director for Trauma Care to the Department of Health charged with developing and implementing government policy across the NHS to improve the care of older people with fragility hip fractures and to establish Regional Trauma Networks and Major Trauma Centres. By 2012 both re-organisations and care pathways were in place and credited with a marked improvement in patient care, outcomes and survival. In 2012 he was appointed as Medical Director for Acute Care to NHS England.

In that role, he undertook a review of England’s urgent and emergency care services in 2013. In that NHS England role, he had the national medical oversight of acute NHS services ranging from pre-hospital and ambulance services, emergency departments, emergency surgery, acute medicine, children’s and maternity, armed forces, and health and justice services and national emergency preparedness and major incidents. He led the transformation of the urgent and emergency care and ambulance services across the NHS in England for Sir Bruce Keogh (NHS Medical Director).

He said he would be unhappy if one of his own relatives was admitted to hospital over the weekend – because of a shortage of consultants. He said patients at weekends were essentially treading water with no progressive treatment or diagnostics and few options to be discharged. He was said to be the 14th most prominent clinical leader in England by the Health Service Journal in October 2014.

In his current role as National Director for Emergency Planning and Incident response to NHS England and Improvement he has led the NHS preparation for EU Exit as Strategic Commander and the response to COVID-19 as Strategic Incident Director.

Willett was appointed Commander of the Order of the British Empire (CBE) in the 2016 New Year Honours and was knighted in the 2021 Birthday Honours for services to the NHS.

In September 2019, he was made an honorary air commodore in the Royal Auxiliary Air Force, and appointed Honorary Air Commodore of No. 4626 of the No. 4626 (County of Wiltshire) Aeromedical Evacuation Squadron.
