= Tribes, Predators & Me =

British nature documentary

Tribes, Predators & Me is a British nature documentary series hosted by Gordon Buchanan, which documents indigenous people living alongside some of the most dangerous animals on earth. It first aired in 2016. It was revived in 2017 for a second season.

== List of episodes ==
1. Anaconda People of the Amazon

Gordon travels to Ecuador's Amazon jungle and meets the Waorani, an Amerindian tribe who live alongside the anaconda, the largest snake in the world.

2. Lion People of the Kalahari

Gordon meets Botswana's San tribe, who live alongside lions.

3. Crocodile People of New Guinea

Gordon travels to the rainforest of New Guinea and meets the indigenous people who live alongside and hunt crocodiles.

4. Shark People of the Pacific

Gordon meets the indigenous tribes of the Solomon Islands who live alongside sharks.

5. Eagle People of Mongolia

Gordon travels to Mongolia and meets the Kazakhs, who have trained golden eagles for millennia.

6. Hyena People of Ethiopia

Gordon travels to Ethiopia where the indigenous tribes live alongside spotted hyenas.
