= Steven Osofsky =

American veterinarian and professor

Steven A. Osofsky is an American veterinarian.

Osofsky earned a bachelor's degree in biology from Harvard College and a Doctor of Veterinary Medicine from Cornell University. He teaches within the Department of Population Medicine and Diagnostic Sciences at Cornell's College of Veterinary Medicine, where he is the Jay Hyman Professor of Wildlife Health & Health Policy.
