= Will Millard =

British expedition leader

Will Millard is a British expedition leader, writer and broadcaster. He was born in Norfolk and grew up there before moving abroad to become a teacher.

== Education ==
Following graduation from the University of Leeds, Millard moved to Indonesia. He travelled in Southeast Asia and spent a year studying South Asian culture and Society at the National University of Singapore.

== Expeditions ==
Millard spent several years in New Guinea, leading several expeditions exploring the local area between 2008 and 2012. In 2013, he travelled down the rafts on the border of Sierra Leone and Liberia.

== Presenting ==
2015 saw Millard present Hunters of the South Sea. Each episode saw him live with a community which still relied heavily on fishing, and investigated how these communities were adapting to the modern world. The series was broadcast on BBC Two. In 2016, Millard presented a three-part series The River Taff in which he examined the ecology of the Welsh river.

In 2017, Millard presented Hidden Cardiff, a one-off documentary investigating the history of the Welsh capital. In 2018 he continued to explore Wales, presenting Hidden Wales, while also presenting the three-part series, The River Wye.

2018 also saw present My Year with the Tribe, a documentary in which Millard spends a year with a tribe in West Papua. During his time he learns that previous documentaries had filmed an unrealistic portrayal of the lives of the tribes and uncovered that their culture was changing rapidly due to interactions with the modern world.

In 2019, he presented the six-part series Go Fish, which was broadcast on the BBC. 2020 saw him present Hidden Wales II.

== Books ==
In 2018, Millard had his first book published, titled The Old Man and the Sand Eel.
