= Conservation Through Public Health =

Non-profit organization based in Uganda

- Founder: Gladys Kalema-Zikusoka, Lawrence Zikusoka, Stephen Rubanga
- Purpose: Save species; Promote health of wildlife, humans, and livestock; Empower local communities; Promote sustainability
- Region served: East Africa, Uganda
- Key people: Gladys Kalema-Zikusoka, Lawrence Zikusoka, Stephen Rubanga
- Website: www.ctph.org

Conservation Through Public Health (CTPH) is a non-profit organization based in Uganda and the US that conducts programs to protect gorillas and other wildlife from human and livestock disease risk; to reduce human and livestock diseases in the vicinity of wildlife; to increase the local use of family planning; and to use information communication technology both to help local-level development and to educate people about the environment. It was founded by Gladys Kalema-Zikusoka, Lawrence Zikusoka, and Stephen Rubanga in 2003. It has a special focus on the endangered mountain gorilla and has programs in Bwindi Impenetrable National Park and Queen Elizabeth National Park in Uganda, and cooperative work with parks and wildlife areas extending into Congo and Rwanda.

== Mission ==
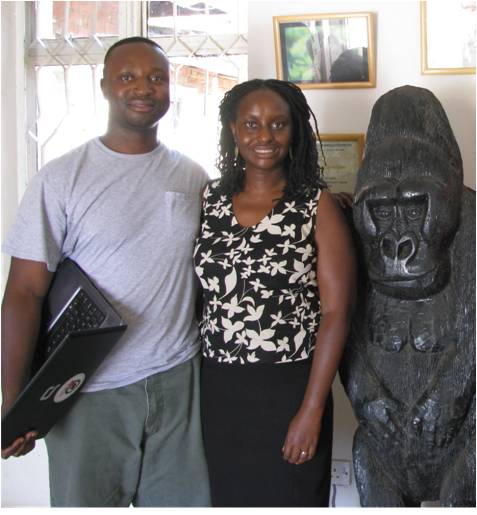
Lawrence Zikusoka and Gladys Kalema-Zikusoka of CTPH, at their headquarters office in Kampala.

Conservation Through Public Health's stated mission is to achieve gorilla conservation by enabling humans, wildlife and livestock to coexist through improving primary healthcare in and around Africa’s protected areas.

== Administration ==
Dr.Gladys Kalema-Zikusoka is the CTPH co-founder and CEO. Lawrence Zikusoka is a co-founder and Director of Information, Communication, and Technology. Stephen Rubanga is the third co-founder and Chief Veterinary Technician.

== Projects and achievements ==
CTPH's three main projects are 1. Wildlife health monitoring, including monitoring mountain gorillas for infection by human diseases and possible treatment; 2. Improving human health and family planning in the vicinity of gorilla habitat to protect gorillas from disease and to benefit local communities; and 3. Information, education, and communication projects in the remote areas where CTPH attempts to benefit the local communities. The organization's work on these projects has been reported on PBS Frontline, at USAID, and presented at the Woodrow Wilson Center.

CTPH has received a number of awards for its achievements, including as Finalist, Stockholm Challenge Award, 2006; and Winner, World Summit Award, Digital Inclusion in Bwindi Communities, 2007; and Skal Foundation Kampala Chapter 611 for promoting conservation activities in Uganda, 2007. The co-founder and CTPH CEO Gladys Kalema-Zikusoka has additionally been recognized with many awards for her achievements with CTPH.

== Awards and recognition ==
- 2020: $100,000 from The St Andrews Prize for the Environment
