= Planespotting Live =

BBC Four television program

- Directed by: Ollie Barlett
- Presented by: Peter Snow; Zoe Laughlin; Andi Peters
- Country of origin: United Kingdom
- Original language: English
- No. of series: 1
- No. of episodes: 3

Production
- Executive producers: Will Daws; Emma Jay
- Producers: James Howard; Peter Leonard
- Production location: United Kingdom
- Editors: Trace Taylor; Francis Roberston
- Running time: 60 minutes
- Production company: BBC

Original release
- Network: BBC Four
- Release: 23 July – 25 July 2019

Planespotting Live is a live television programme broadcast on BBC Four over three nights between 23 and 25 July 2019. Announced on 5 July 2019, it follows on from similar "live" programmes on the BBC such as Trainspotting Live, Airport Live and Volcano Live

== Programme ==
The show is presented by Peter Snow, Zoe Laughlin and Andi Peters. Planespotting Live also featured pre-recorded reports and interviews as well as the real-time broadcast. Live cameras showed airport activity. Peter Snow led the nation on a mass plane-spot asking for users to send in pictures.

== Episode list ==
No. in series	Title	Directed by	Original release date	UK viewers (thousands)
1	"Episode 1"	Emma Jay	23 July 2019	508
Peter Snow leads the nation in a mass planespot live from East Midlands Aeropark
2	"Episode 2"	Emma Jay	24 July 2019	N/A (<493) (Note: Not reported in the weekly top 15 programmes for four-screen viewer ratings.)
Peter Snow presents Episode 2 where the spotter's attention turns to short-haul planes. Live action is shown to the audience at London City Airport
3	"Episode 3"	Emma Jay	25 July 2019	496
Peter Snow hosts the final episode where the spotter's attention turns to military aircraft, with emphasis on RAF Brize Norton.

== See also ==
- Airport Live
- Trainspotting Live
- The Tube
- The Railway: Keeping Britain On Track
