= Trainspotting Live =

Live BBC television programme

- Presented by: Peter Snow; Hannah Fry; Dick Strawbridge; Tim Dunn
- Country of origin: United Kingdom
- Original language: English
- No. of series: 1
- No. of episodes: 3

Production
- Executive producer: Becky Colls
- Producers: Joanne Ashman; Rory Barker
- Production location: United Kingdom
- Editor: Brian Campbell
- Running time: 60 minutes
- Production company: BBC

Original release
- Network: BBC Four
- Release: 11 July – 13 July 2016

Trainspotting Live is a live television programme broadcast on BBC Four over three nights from 11 July 2016. It followed on from similar live programmes on the BBC such as Airport Live and Volcano Live.

== Programme ==
The show was presented by Peter Snow, Hannah Fry, Dick Strawbridge and Tim Dunn from the Didcot Railway Centre in Didcot. Trainspotting Live also featured pre-recorded reports and interviews as well as the real-time broadcast. Live cameras showed railway activity on the nearby Great Western Main Line.

During the broadcast, viewers were asked to send in footage of their recent spots, and were tasked with spotting a specific locomotive as well as a rare train, which was nicknamed "The Holy Grail of the Rail".

== Episode list ==
Viewing figures from the Broadcasters' Audience Research Board (BARB).

| No. | Title | Directed by | Original release date | Viewers |
|---|---|---|---|---|
| 1 | "Episode 1" | Tony Gretch-Smith | 11 July 2016 | 775,000 |
Peter challenged Ian McMillan to write a poem about the Flying Scotsman. Tim was tasked with spotting the Black Five steam locomotive, and Dick spotted live from Doncaster station.
| 2 | "Episode 2" | Tony Gretch-Smith | 12 July 2016 | 675,000 |
The team focused on diesel locomotives, particularly on the Class 37 and InterCity 125. Hannah interviewed Sir Kenneth Grange on the InterCity 125's design. Tim was at Carlisle to spot a Class 37 whilst Dick spotted from Swindon.
| 3 | "Episode 3" | Tony Gretch-Smith | 13 July 2016 | 508,000 |
The team explored the future of rail travel. Dick spotted from Clapham Junction whilst Tim got an exclusive ride on the brand new Class 800 IEP with Great Western Railway

== Criticism and controversy ==
In the first episode, Peter Snow mistakenly said that a five-month-old video of Class 66s on delivery was live. This resulted in complaints from the general public and as a result the incident made the front pages of The Sun newspaper. A spokesman from the BBC said that the show had made a mistake in the “excitement of a live broadcast.”

In the second episode, Peter Snow mistakenly called an LNER Thompson/Peppercorn Class K1 No. 62005 an LMS Black Five.

== See also ==
- Airport Live
- The Tube
- The Railway: Keeping Britain On Track
