= Nerilie Abram =

Australian scientist

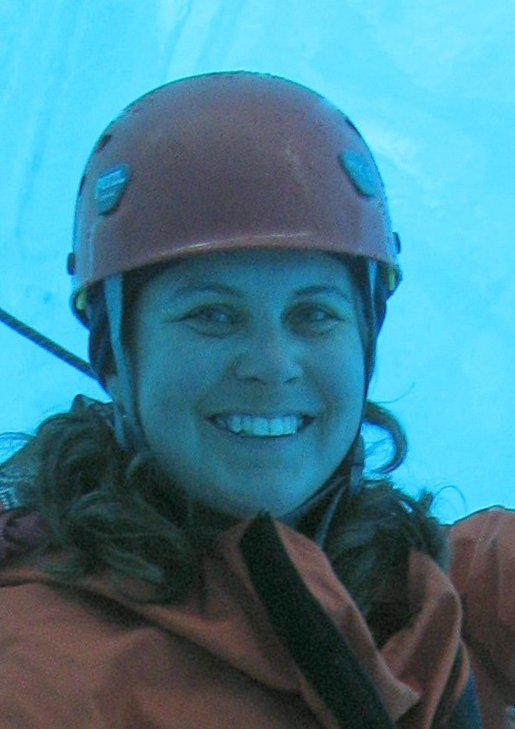
- Born: 1977 (age 48–49)
- Education: University of Sydney; Australian National University
- Scientific career
- Fields: Climatology
- Institutions: Australian National University

Nerilie Abram FAA (born June 1977) is an Australian professor at the ANU Research School of Earth Sciences, Australian National University, Canberra, Australia. Her areas of expertise are in climate change and paleoclimatology, including the climate of Antarctica, the Indian Ocean Dipole, and impacts on the climate of Australia.

== Early life and education ==
Abram grew up in Wangi Wangi, New South Wales, Australia. She completed her secondary education at Toronto High School.

Abram completed a Bachelor of Science (Advanced) degree at the University of Sydney in 2000. This degree included an honours project studying the Holocene climate history of the Ryukyu Islands, Japan. She graduated from her undergraduate studies with the University Medal.

Abram then commenced her PhD through the Research School of Earth Sciences at the Australian National University in 2004. During this time she was the recipient of the John Conrad Jaeger Scholarship. Her postgraduate studies earned her the Mervyn and Kaitalin Paterson Fellowship and the Robert Hill Memorial Prize for excellence in scientific research, communication and outreach.

== Research ==
Abram's research expertise spans Antarctic and tropical climate systems. She uses Porites corals, Speleothem samples from caves and Ice core samples to reconstruct climate changes in the past to provide a crucial long-term perspective on recent and projected future climate changes. Abram's publication record includes first-author papers across the scientific journals of Science, Nature, Nature Geoscience, and Nature Climate Change.

Between 2004 and 2011 Abram was an ice core scientist with the British Antarctic Survey. Here, she was part of the team that drilled the James Ross Island ice core in 2008. Abram's discoveries from this project included that the Antarctic Peninsula is warming very rapidly, resulting in a 10-fold increase summer ice melt in that area of Antarctica.

Abram was part of the chemical analysis team of the NEEM ice core project in Northern Greenland in 2010 which sought to retrieve ice from the Eemian inter-glacial period to discover what Earth would be like under the effects of global warming. In the summer of 2013/14 Abram was also a member of the international team that drilled the Aurora Basin ice core in East Antarctica.

In 2014 Abram demonstrated that the southward shift in westerly winds caused by greenhouse gas emissions has moved these winds to their most southward position in at least the last 1,000 years causing a marked reduction in rainfall in southern Australia.

== Science communication ==
Abram is a dedicated science communicator, and her work has been covered by international print, online, radio and television media outlets. She has also been interviewed for documentaries including the BBC Men of Rock series hosted by Iain Stewart, and for the Natural History Museum exhibition of Robert Scott’s final expedition.

In 2013, Abram wrote an invited essay on Antarctic ice melt and sea level rise for The Curious Country, a book about the importance of Australian science published for the Office of the Chief Scientist (Australia). This work was later selected for republication in the anthology of Best Australian Science Writing 2014.

Abram is a mother of three children and has a strong interest in encouraging other women in scientific careers. Her work as an Antarctic scientist and mother was the subject of a profile piece for “I don’t know how she does it” in the Times Magazine, London.

== Awards and recognition ==
In 2011, Abram returned to Australia after being awarded a QEII fellowship through the Australian Research Council. In 2014 Abram received a second ARC Discovery Grant to continue her groundbreaking work studying the effects of tropical and Antarctic climate change on Australia's rainfall patterns. Abram was the 2015 recipient of the Dorothy Hill award from the Australian Academy of Science which recognises excellence in Earth Sciences research by a woman under the age of 40.

Abram is co-editor-in-chief for the open-access journal Climate of the Past since 2010, a journal that is associated with the European Geosciences Union.

She was elected a Fellow of the Australian Academy of Science in 2024.
