= Airport Live =

Live BBC television programme

- Directed by: Stephen Neal
- Presented by: Kate Humble
- Starring: Dallas Campbell; Dan Snow; Anita Rani
- Theme music composer: Carl Harms
- Country of origin: United Kingdom
- Original language: English
- No. of series: 1
- No. of episodes: 4

Production
- Executive producer: Lisa Ausden
- Producers: Amanda Lyon; Chris Parkin
- Production location: United Kingdom
- Editor: Brian Campbell
- Running time: 60 minutes
- Production company: BBC

Original release
- Network: BBC Two
- Release: 17 June – 20 June 2013

Airport Live is a live television programme broadcast on BBC Two over four nights from 17 June 2013 to 20 June 2013. The show was commissioned following the success of other "live" programmes such as Volcano Live.The show was presented by Kate Humble, Dan Snow, Anita Rani and Dallas Campbell from Heathrow Airport in London. Dallas Campbell, Anita Rani and Dan Snow presented segments, which attempted to discover the principles behind Heathrow Airport. Airport Live also featured pre-recorded reports and interviews in addition to the real-time broadcast. Live cameras showed airport activity from around the airport and online features included the history of the airport site.

== Episode list ==
Episode viewing figures from Broadcasters' Audience Research Board (BARB).

#	Title	Directed by	Original release date	Total viewers (millions)
1	"Episode 1"	Stephen Neal	17 June 2013	2,860,000
An overview of Heathrow Airport and the scale of operations faced by air traffic control.
2	"Episode 2"	Stephen Neal	18 June 2013	2,750,000
Following a shorthaul flight turnaround, with just 45 minutes from landing to takeoff.
3	"Episode 3"	Stephen Neal	19 June 2013	2,250,000
Dallas Campbell looks at the hundreds of markings that must be painted on to every plane.
4	"Episode 4"	Stephen Neal	20 June 2013	2,730,000
Dallas Campbell is at the controls of a flight simulator to see if he can land an Airbus A380.

== See also ==
- The Railway: Keeping Britain On Track
- The Route Masters: Running London's Roads
- The Tube (2012 TV series)
