= Stuff Your Rucksack =

Non-profit organization

The Stuff Your Rucksack Foundation, or simply Stuff Your Rucksack, is a not-for-profit organization helping to carry resources to charitable projects in need across the globe. The Foundation is registered in Guernsey and was established in 2006 by British television presenter Kate Humble.

Stuff Your Rucksack advocates responsible travel, encouraging travellers to support organizations and projects around the world that need equipment and resources by packing extra items in their luggage. The charity's website acts as a message board between travellers and the small charities and organisations that require extra resources.

== History ==
In 1999, Humble spent 35 days crossing the Sahara, ending up in a remote oasis village 200 km north of Timbuktu. She sought permission to stay there from the head of the village and was asked to visit the local school. The children at the school were keen to find out how long it would take for Humble to get back to England in camel days. Humble started to draw lines in the sand, but found it difficult to describe the sea without a world map. This experience motivated her to start the charity, which finally launched in 2006.

Explaining the rationale behind the charity's website, Humble said: “How many times have you been travelling and visited a school or community or local charity that you would love to help? The school needs books, or a map or pencils; an orphanage needs children's clothes or toys. All things that, if only you'd known, you could've stuffed in your rucksack. But once you get home you forget, or you've lost the address, or worry that whatever you send will be stolen before it even gets there...”

The website was relaunched on May 19, 2010, with a party at the Royal Geographical Society in London. It has received support from a number of UK celebrities including Ben Fogle and Simon Reeve.

== Projects and organisations ==
Today, there are more than 120 projects co-ordinated by the charity, which are located in more than 45 countries. They range from schools and orphanages to veterinary clinics and healthcare charities. More than half of the projects featured are located in Africa – 21 of which are linked with long-established organizations such as SOS Children's Villages. The projects and organizations on the website are not all registered charities. Some are local community-run initiatives designed to help people find a route out of poverty.

=== Examples of projects ===
- PinkDrive is an initiative in Frankenwald, South Africa, which focuses on breast cancer awareness and is listed as needing bras and items of clothing.
- Earthwise Valley is a volunteer-run sustainable living project based in Tuateawa's rainforest in New Zealand. The project is listed as needing outdoor tools, office equipment, relevant books and educational DVDs.
- HELP Madagascar is a not-for-profit organisation committed to alleviating poverty in communities held back by a lack of education or healthcare. The organization is listed as needing plasters and French-English dictionaries.
- Dogstar Foundation works with local vets in Kegalle to provide access to free veterinary care, sterilisation and vaccination for dogs and cats from rural communities in Sri Lanka. The organization is listed as needing milk powder for puppies and kittens, small dog collars and flea/tick treatments.

As founder of The Stuff Your Rucksack Foundation, Humble has been featured in The Daily Express. The Observer, The New Delhi Sunday Guardian, and The Sunday Times.

== See also ==
- Ludo Graham
