= Dallas Campbell =

British actor (born 1970)

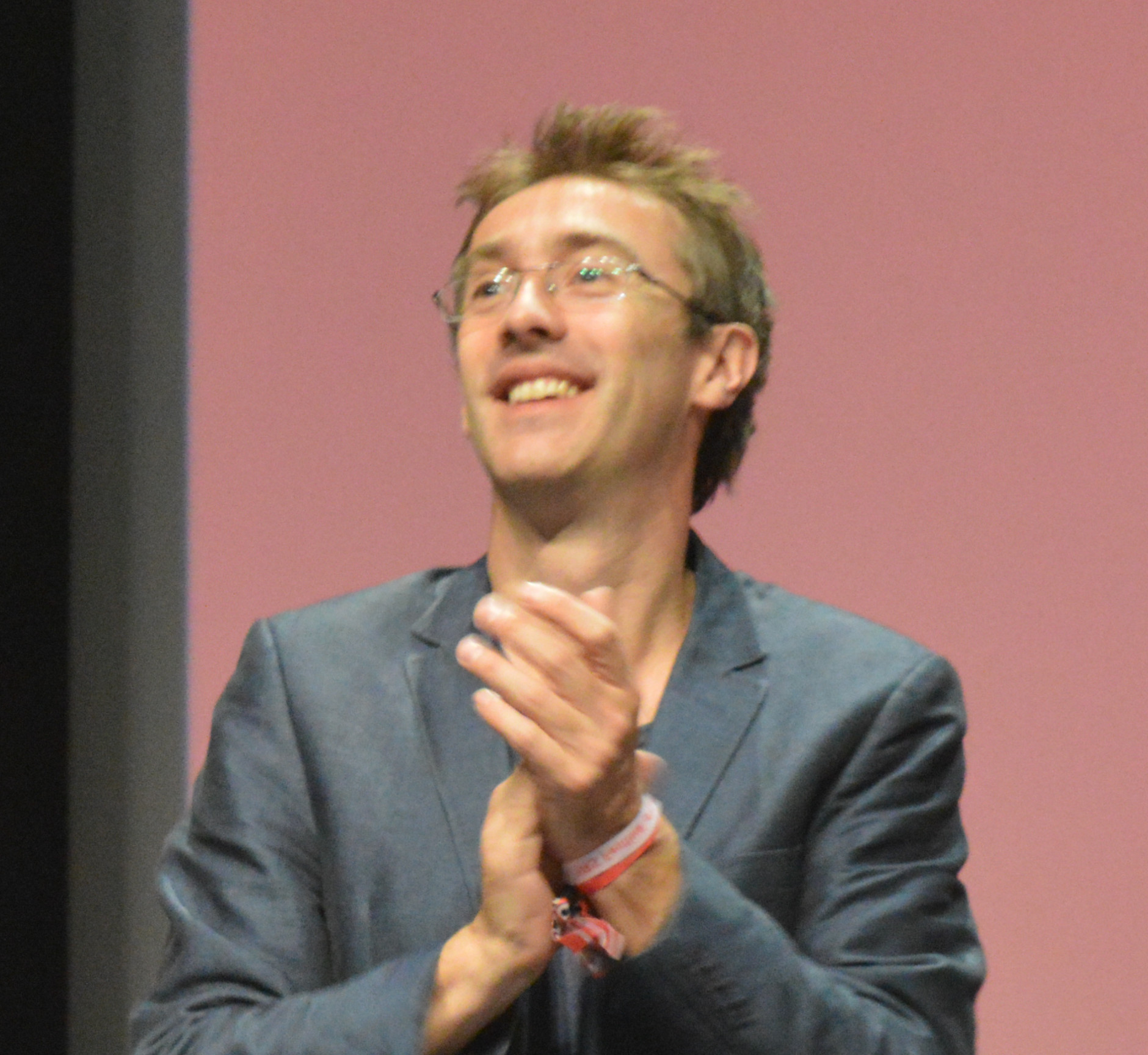
- Campbell in 2015
- Born: Robert Dallas Campbell; 17 September 1970 (age 55); Kilmacolm, Renfrewshire, Scotland
- Occupations: Actor; film director; screenwriter; television presenter; author
- Years active: 1993–present
- Spouse: Victoria Goodall (1999–2019)
- Children: 2
- Relatives: Robert Eddison (great-uncle)

Robert Dallas Campbell (born 17 September 1970) is a British television presenter, podcast host, and television and stage actor, previously a presenter on the factual Channel 5 series The Gadget Show in 2008 and BBC One science series Bang Goes the Theory from 2009 to 2012.

== Early life ==
Born in Kilmacolm, Scotland, he attended schools in Darras Hall and Ponteland, Northumberland, continuing his education at Glenalmond College in Perthshire, Scotland.

== Career ==
Campbell at the 2009 Bang Goes the Theory roadshow

Campbell began his career as an actor; in his early twenties he appeared in the play Who is Eddie Linden at the Old Red Lion in Islington in 1995, starring alongside Michael Deacon, who was playing the poet Eddie Linden. In 1997, Campbell appeared in The Warp, which is the longest play ever performed (over 24 hours).

Campbell also appears in an episode of A Touch of Frost in series 6 as Mr Renfrew, and was the screenwriter and director of the short subject film No Deposit, No Return in 2004.

His television presenting career began on The Gadget Show (Channel 5) followed by BBC One's prime time science magazine show Bang Goes the Theory. In April 2014 he presented The Treasure Hunters for BBC One with Ellie Harrison which saw them on the trail of earth's most prized and valuable treasures both natural and man-made. Supersized Earth (BBC One), a BAFTA-nominated series that examined the scale and pace with which humans have transformed the Earth in a generation.

Airport Live (BBC Two) featured three days of access 'airside' at Heathrow Airport with Kate Humble and Anita Rani. Egypt's Lost Cities, again for BBC One, was a feature-length documentary that used satellite technology to hunt for undiscovered historical treasures, and a six-part National Geographic series Time Scanners used laser scanning technology to uncover the secrets of the world's most famous historical buildings, from Machu Picchu in Peru to St Paul's Cathedral.

On BBC Four he is a regular presenter of the Horizon series, covering a wide variety of big science subjects from dogs to quantum mechanics and on the one-off documentaries Voyager: Beyond the final frontier – The story of NASA’s Voyager mission and The Drake Equation: The Search for Life – an investigation into the science and history behind our efforts to find life beyond the earth.

Dallas hosted Doctor Who's 50th Anniversary celebrations between 22 and 24 November 2013, at London's ExCel Arena, Stargazing Live, and a two-summer national tour of Bang Goes the Theory.

He is a regular contributor to the BBC's science magazine Focus, The Times's Eureka magazine, and The Observer. He has appeared on BBC Radio 4's comedy science show The Infinite Monkey Cage, with Robin Ince and Brian Cox, Loose Ends with Clive Anderson, and Shaun Keavney's Breakfast Show on BBC Radio 6 Music.

On 2 January 2015, Campbell appeared on and won Celebrity Mastermind, with filmmaker Werner Herzog as his specialist subject. He appeared in The Dumping Ground episode "Fake It to Make It'" which aired on the CBBC Channel in February 2015.

In July 2015, he presented a two-part series for BBC One called Britain Beneath Your Feet.

In June 2016, Campbell presented a three-part documentary for the BBC called City in the Sky, exploring the world of aviation. He presented this alongside mathematician Hannah Fry who specialises in the mathematics of cities.

In December 2016, he was a contestant on Robot Wars alongside Suzi Perry.

In 2017, his debut book Ad Astra: An Illustrated Guide to Leaving the Planet was published by Simon & Schuster.

In October 2019, he chaired The Sky at Night: Question Time filmed at Warwick University as part of the British Science Festival.

In March 2022, Dallas began presenting Patented: History of Inventions , a twice-weekly podcast which investigates the history of invention and innovation, from the stream train to the condom.

== See also ==
- Science of Stupid
