= Adam Henson =

British television personality (born 1966)

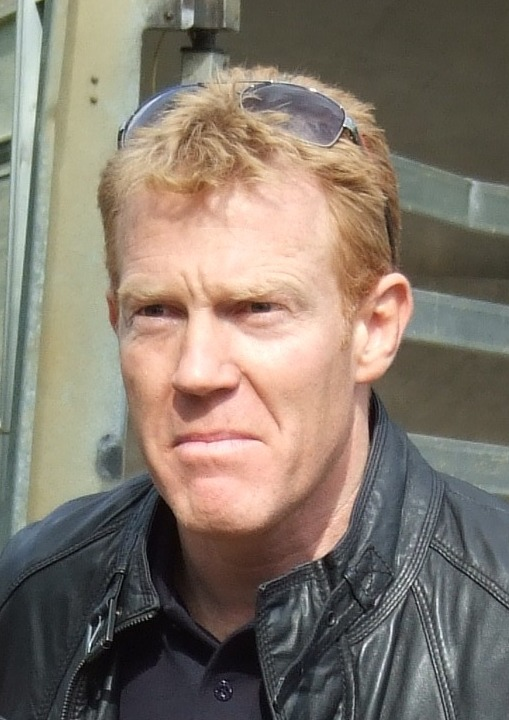
- Born: 8 January 1966 (age 60)
- Years active: 2001-present

Adam John Lincoln Henson (born 8 January 1966) is an English farmer, author and television presenter.

== Early career ==
Born on the farm he now works, Bemborough Farm near Guiting Power, Gloucestershire, he was educated at Cheltenham College and later at Westwood's Grammar School, Northleach. Henson did some work at the Chatsworth Estate, and gained an HND in Agriculture at Seale-Hayne Agricultural College in Newton Abbot, Devon, where he met his business partner and friend Duncan Andrews. After graduation, the pair travelled for over a year through Australia working on sheep and arable stations, then a kiwi plantation in New Zealand, before returning to plant tea in the Atherton Tablelands in Queensland. After diving on the Great Barrier Reef, they returned via California and Canada. Henson now runs the Cotswold Farm Park which his father started, which attracts over 70,000 visitors per annum. Adam Henson and Duncan Andrews took on the lease of Bemborough Farm from his father in 1998, and the pair now jointly run the 1,600-acre (650 ha) estate, growing wheat, spring barley and oilseed rape, alongside a flock of 350 commercial ewes and numerous rare breeds of farm animals.

== TV career ==
Henson broke into television work in 2001 when he was successful in gaining a presenting position on the BBC's Countryfile programme, after it ran a presenter search. Since this time he has worked on programmes such as Countryfile Summer Diaries and Inside Out. Due to his extensive farming knowledge, he has also worked on BBC Radio 4's On Your Farm and Farming Today, and the joint presenter with Kate Humble of Lambing Live.

He now has a wider presenting portfolio, which includes BBC's Gardener's World Live in June 2010.

At a farmers' conference in St Mellion in 2011, Cornwall, Henson revealed he received death threats against his children after he presented reports on Countryfile about badger culling.

In November 2013 he starred alongside Nigel Slater on BBC's Nigel and Adam's Farm Kitchen.

== Books ==
Henson is a published author with 6 books geared towards adult and two for kids as well as a book only available in audio book form.

== Personal life ==
Henson's grandfather Leslie Henson, was a music hall and musical comedy comedian and actor. His farmer father Joe Henson MBE, presented a countryside TV programme with Angela Rippon and Phil Drabble; while his uncle, Nicky Henson, was a successful actor and his cousin Christian Henson is a composer. Henson is married to Charlotte "Charlie" Henson and has two children.

- Countryfile: Adam's Farm: My Life on the Land (2011) ISBN 978-1849900706
- Cotswold Farm Park (2012) ISBN 978-0957237704
- Like Farmer Like Son (2016) ISBN 978-1785940712
- A Farmer and His Dog (2017) ISBN 978-1785942471
- A Breed Apart: My Adventures with Britain’s Rare Breeds (2019) ISBN 978-1473531680
- Two for Joy: The myriad ways to enjoy the countryside (2023) ISBN 978-1408727362

== Kids books ==
- A Year on Adam's Farm (2021) ISBN 978-0241452974 Board book
- Curious Questions From Adam’s Farm (2024) ISBN 978-0241662342 Preschool

== Audible exclusive ==
- Christmas on the Farm: Wintry Tales from a Life Spent Working with Animals (2023)
