= Journeys into the Ring of Fire =

- Genre: Documentary
- Presented by: Iain Stewart
- Country of origin: United Kingdom
- Original language: English
- No. of seasons: 1
- No. of episodes: 4

Production
- Executive producer: Marc Goodchild
- Running time: 60 minutes

Original release
- Network: BBC One
- Release: 5 September – 26 September 2006

Journeys into the Ring of Fire is BBC documentary series that was first broadcast in 2006 on BBC One and has been rerun several times on BBC Four. In this series of four programmes, the geologist Professor Iain Stewart travels to four locations on the Pacific Rim to discover how geology has shaped human history and culture in these regions. The series was produced by Jeremy Phillips and was a BBC and Science Channel co-production.

== Episodes ==
No.	Title	Producer	Original air date (UK)
1	Indonesia	Charles Colville	5 September 2006
2	California	Nigel Walk	12 September 2006
3	Peru	Arif Nurmohamed	19 September 2006
4	Japan	Charles Colville	26 September 2006
