= The Spice Trail =

- Genre: Documentary
- Directed by: Paul Sapin
- Presented by: Kate Humble
- Composer: Tim Cooke
- Country of origin: United Kingdom
- Original language: English
- No. of episodes: 3

Production
- Executive producer: Andrew Snowball
- Producer: Paul Sapin
- Running time: 60 minutes
- Production company: Lion Television

Original release
- Network: BBC Two
- Release: 17 February – 3 March 2011

The Spice Trail is a British television documentary series first broadcast on BBC Two in 2011 looking at the discovery and history of spices. Presented by Kate Humble, she travels around the world to see how spices are grown and investigates their history. She also tells stories and interviews people from the areas of their origin. The series looks at how local economies are built upon the income from the spices and the threats to these economies such as disease, globalisation and fakes.

== Episodes ==
=== Episode one: "Pepper and Cinnamon" ===
In the first half we visit India to look at Pepper and find out that Black pepper corns are traditionally sun dried. We are told that White pepper is soaked and de-husked to make it milder. Green pepper is mentioned but not explained and Red is not mentioned at all. We see how the corns are removed by being trodden on and massaged by bare feet. We see the devastation a Fungal disease has brought to what was once the primary area of production. We also see the silent and secret negotiation language of the buyers and sellers who use their hands under a cloth to negotiate without the need for a spoken language (a kind of Tactile signing).

In the second half we see small Cinnamon trees being cut in Sri Lanka. The outer Bark is scraped by hand and the inner bark is then carefully removed with a knife. The best parts are used to create an outer sheath and the other parts are placed within. These outer sheaths are joined to each other and overlap slightly to create a standard length stick or rod known as a quill. The sticks are then rolled daily as they dry and are tied into bundles for trading and transport.

=== Episode two: "Nutmeg and Cloves" ===
In this programme we visit the Spice Islands in Indonesia, the original home of these two spices. In the first half we look at nutmeg and discover it has many layers. There is the outer fruit which is used for jam. When ripe the fruit opens revealing a red nut and this is the best time to pick it we are told. However, in the programme we see examples of fruit being cut open when it has been picked early. We see the outer red skin of the nut being removed and dried to create mace. The inner skin or black shell of the nut is then removed and discarded and what is left is the hard brown "nut" we call nutmeg. We also find out that Almond trees are important for shade and a species of Dove is responsible for planting most of the almond trees and nutmeg trees.

The second half of the programme looks at Cloves. We are introduced to the pink flower buds on the tall trees and are told that the best cloves are pink and not yet opened. A mixture of long poles, rope pulling and tree climbing are used so the pickers can collect the clusters of buds from all over the trees. Back on the ground the individual cloves are snapped off from the bud cluster and they are sun dried in the streets. The rest of the bud cluster (stalks and a few small young leaves) are used as an additive to Tobacco, and we see Kate attempting, after much effort, to make a Herbal cigarette.

=== Episode three: "Vanilla and Saffron" ===
In the first half the programme looks at Saffron. We visit the Berbers of Morocco, the origin of saffron to see the purple Crocus flowers growing in what looks like a desert. The harvest lasts no more than a month and the flowers are picked early every morning. Each bulb produces four flowers each season.

The programme then moves to Spain which was suitable for saffron growth, and describes how it became the saffron capital of the world after being conquered by the Muslims. We are told that saffron from all over the world is now brought there and traded. With saffron being so expensive it is often diluted with other spices (such as turmeric), stamens from other plants or species and even plastic and other contaminants. We got to visit one of the laboratories which does DNA testing and Spectrum analysis to identify diluted saffron.

In the second half of the program we discover that Vanilla is a Mexican spice. The Pollination is performed by the Melipona bee that is native to Mexico and we find that it was not possible to grow vanilla elsewhere in the world until a slave boy discovered how to self-pollinate the plants. Once artificial pollination was discovered the price collapsed and the vanilla trade in Mexico is now greatly reduced compared to what it used to be. We are told that vanilla is an orchid but also a vine. We get to see a vanilla flower being self-pollinated and are told they are only open for a few hours. It takes 9 months for the pods to develop and another 9 months for them to dry and cure. The best pods have crystal on them.

== Reviews ==
Most of the reviews found Humble to be enthusiastic and sincere and show was liked by many of the reviewers. However, others found the show to be repetitive and found Kate to be patronising.

The Guardian found the show "interesting" and repetitive and warned Kate not to read the review because they were "going to be mean and horrid" to her.

Then Kate goes to Sri Lanka and does the same with cinnamon. Oooh, can I have a go, let me try, oh I'm rubbish at it, and you're amazing, ha ha ha.

The Independent were "in love" with Kate and found her to be enthusiastic and compared her to a head girl.

One of the things that made The Spice Trail so watchable was the enthusiasm – the effusiveness – of all involved. No one looked like they'd been kowtowed into it by some executive. They all seemed to be genuinely engaged. And so it was that, not only did we meet the buyers and sellers of the spices in question, but we got to go into people's homes and hear about their families.

The Mirror was more balanced, calling her enthusiastic in her efforts to engage with the locals and sincere as she states the obvious.

And it’s lucky for Kate that our favourite flavourings originate in some of the most beautiful spots in the world.

Metro focused their review on the problems the growers face and consider Kate to be patronising and mention a Blue Peter style of reporting.

Though every so often, she took a nibble out of a hard-edged news story – the disease wrecking India’s pepper crops and driving farmers to suicide, the rip-off deals that turn spice workers into virtual slaves – she quickly skipped merrily on, playing the colonial grande dame out to charm the exotic locals.

The Express gave a factual account of the show and made it one of their "picks of the day"

KATE Humble travels along India’s fascinating Spice Coast to uncover the story of pepper, once known as black gold.
