= Orbit: Earth's Extraordinary Journey =

- Genre: Documentary
- Presented by: Kate Humble; Helen Czerski
- Country of origin: United Kingdom
- Original language: English
- No. of series: 1
- No. of episodes: 3

Production
- Running time: 60 minutes
- Production company: BBC Studios

Original release
- Network: BBC Two
- Release: 4 March – 18 March 2012

Orbit: Earth's Extraordinary Journey is a BBC documentary series presented by Kate Humble and Helen Czerski which aired in 2012. Running for three 60 minute episodes, the series focuses on Earth's orbit around the Sun and its effect on humans, the climate, and geological features.

Both presenters visited various locations on Earth including the Cave of Swimmers in Egypt and the Arizona desert.

== Episodes ==
Episode No.	Description	Broadcast Date
1	Following Earth's orbit around the Sun from July to the December solstice.	4 March 2012
2	A journey from January to the March equinox.	11 March 2012
3	Showing of the tilt of Earth and how it creates extreme weather.	18 March 2012

== Merchandise ==
A single-disc DVD of the series was released on 26 March 2012.

== Critical reaction ==
The show received a good review from Stuart Jeffries in The Guardian. However, he noted the scheduling of the show being after the watershed, and questioned the need for the presenters to travel around the world for various segments.
