= Al Murray's Road to Berlin =

2004 British television documentary series

- DVD cover of Al Murray's Road to Berlin
- Genre: Documentary
- Presented by: Al Murray
- Country of origin: United Kingdom
- No. of seasons: 1
- No. of episodes: 10

Production
- Producer: Ludo Graham

Original release
- Network: Discovery Channel UK
- Release: 2004 – 2004

Al Murray's Road to Berlin is a British documentary television series about World War II, presented by Al Murray. The ten-episode series was produced for the Discovery Channel, and first broadcast in 2004. During the series, Murray travels across the Western Front in a restored Willys MB Jeep, covering the timeline from the Invasion of Normandy to the fall of Berlin, interviewing survivors and showcasing some of the equipment used.

== Overview ==
Seven episodes in the ten-episode series deal directly with the land, amphibious, airborne and tactical air force operations involved in the general British and American advance from Normandy to Berlin, while three others look at related topics, with one episode each devoted to the German V-weapons programme (episode 4), the strategic air force bombing of Essen (episode 6), and the Soviet Eastern Front campaign (episode 8). As the British and Americans were not directly involved in taking Berlin itself, the second half of the last episode covers the Soviet operations.

== Format ==
During the series, Murray visits the locations dealt with in each episode, mostly travelling in a restored US Army Willys MB Jeep. In all episodes, Murray interviews survivors, both civilian and military, and Murray's narrative of the progression of events is supplemented with archive footage. In addition, several episodes feature demonstrations using period equipment, such as tanks, boats and guns. As well as being the presenter and narrator of the series, in episode 1, "D-Day", Murray re-enacts a beach landing, while in episode 5, "Arnhem", he takes part in a 60th anniversary parachute jump. In relevant episodes, Murray also details the tactical situation using maps.

== Episodes ==
The first series was broadcast over 10 episodes:

1. D-Day
2. The Battle for Normandy
3. The Push For Paris
4. Hitler's Terror Weapon
5. Arnhem
6. Air War
7. The Battle of the Bulge
8. The Eastern Front
9. Crossing the Rhine
10. The Battle for Berlin

=== D-Day ===
In "D-Day", Murray looks at the opening phase of the Allied invasion of Normandy, and the battles on the crucial east flank by British forces, designed to allow the securing of the critical objective of the city of Caen, key to controlling Normandy.

The episode looked in detail at Montgomery's preparations for the invasion, codenamed Operation Overlord, planned by Supreme Headquarters Allied Expeditionary Force (SHAEF) at Southwick House, Portsmouth. It also examines the glider-borne attack on Pegasus Bridge, a bascule bridge across the Caen Canal; the parachute and glider attack on the Merville Gun Battery; and the landings at Sword Beach, the farthest east of the five landing points.

During the episode, Murray re-enacts a beach landing from a landing craft, wading up the beach in period kit and rifle.

People

- Private Wally Parr, 22, of the Ox and Bucks Light Infantry, part of the attack on Pegasus Bridge
- Corporal Len Daniels, 22, of 9 Parachute Squadron RE, tasked with breaching the Merville battery defences
- Private John Roberts, 19, of the East Yorkshire Regiment, part of the first wave onto Sword Beach

Equipment

- Airspeed Horsa Glider (static)
- Mk V LCVP (Landing Craft, Vehicle, Personnel), used in the re-enactment

=== The Battle for Normandy ===
In "The Battle for Normandy", Murray looks at the battles to secure the strategically valuable town of Caen, the vital port of Cherbourg Naval Base, and the allied resupply efforts.

The episode looked in detail at the British 22nd Armoured Brigade's involvement in the Battle of Villers-Bocage, south of Caen, and the German counter-attack by the German tank commander Michael Wittmann. The episode also examined the Allied artificial Mulberry harbour installed at Arromanches, the American advance west to obtain the port of Cherbourg, and the Allied aerial bombing of Caen during Operation Charnwood. Finally, it examined Operation Goodwood, the Allied advance to Bourguébus Ridge beyond Caen to the east.

People

- Harold Currie, 19, a Wireless Operator in a Cromwell tank involved in the fighting at Villers-Bocage
- Sapper George Batts, 18, involved in building the harbour at Arromanches
- Private Ed Manley, 19, of the American 101st Airborne Division, involved in the American breakout
- Andre Heintz, 24, a member of the French Resistance operating in Caen
- Gunner Les Dinning, 18, of the 7th Armoured Division (Desert Rats), involved at Bourguébus

Equipment

- A German wheeled 88mm gun used as an anti-tank weapon at Bourguébus

=== The Push for Paris ===
In "The Push for Paris", Murray covers the American breakout in Normandy, and the German failed counterattack Operation Lüttich, leaving the way open to Paris.

The episode examined in detail the fighting around Mortain where the German counter-attack stalled, and the development of the Falaise pocket, in which the over-extended Germans became trapped in a pincer movement. It then traces the German attempts to escape under bombardment and Hawker Typhoon air attack through the 'Failaise Gap' between Argentan and Falaise into a funnel at Chambois, nicknamed 'the corridor of death' by the Germans, and ending with the battle at Mont Ormel ridge and the final closure of the gap.

People

- Second Lieutenant Robert Weiss, 21, 2Lt, of the American 30th Infantry Division (United States), a reconnaissance officer at Hill 317 in Mortain
- Gunner Ken Tout, 20, of the 1st Northants tank regiment, involved in the Falaise pocket
- Warrant Officer Jack Hodges, 21, of No. 174 Squadron RAF, pilot in the Hawker Typhoon attacks on Falaise and Ormel

Equipment

- M4 Sherman Tank, "Fury"

=== Hitler's Terror Weapon ===
In "Hitler's Terror Weapon", Murray departs from the road to Berlin to look at the German V-weapons programme.

The episode looks in detail at the underground V weapons factory at Nordhausen, and the Mittelbau-Dora camp which provided the slave labour for assembling the V weapons. It examined the V-1 flying bomb and V-2 rocket attacks on London, the first V-2 strike in Chiswick, and the Royal Air Force attempts to attack the V-2's at their launch sites near the Hague with the help of the Dutch resistance.

People

- John Malin, 15, a London schoolboy who witnessed the first V-2 explosion
- Peter Wolff, 20, a Jewish slave labourer at the Mittelbau-Dora camp
- Michael Francis, 22, a pilot in No. 602 Squadron RAF, involved in the air attacks on V-2 launch sites

=== Arnhem ===
In "Arnhem", Murray looks at Operation Market Garden, the Allied attempt to shorten the war with a bold aerial assault on the road bridge at Arnhem.

The episode examines in detail the Battle of Arnhem, the parachute landings some 8 miles from Arnhem, the capture of a railway bridge 3 miles from Arnhem, and the capture of the Arnhem road bridge, the counter-attack by a Panzer unit which had been refitting nearby, and the ultimate retreat and fighting at Oosterbeek (the 'cauldron'), and their evacuation in Operation Berlin (Arnhem).

During the episode, Murray trained for and participated his first ever parachute jump, as part of a 60th anniversary jump commemorating the operation.

People

- Private Bruce E Cox, 20, of the British 3rd Battalion, Parachute Regiment (3 Para), who also jumped in the 60th anniversary
- Major Tony Hibbert, 27, of the British 1st Parachute Brigade, who was with the group of 740 men of 2 Para who reached the road bridge
- Lieutenant James "Jimmy" Cleminson, 23, of 3 Para

=== Air War ===
In "Air War", in a departure from the road to Berlin, Murray looks at the bombing of Essen by the Royal Air Force.

The episode examined in detail the RAF's efforts to destroy the German Krupp armament factories in Essen in the Ruhr Valley, and the raid of 23 October 1944, described as the largest raid the RAF had ever undertaken. It covered the RAF tactics of using the Oboe navigation system to guide its heavy bombers, and the use of the de Havilland Mosquito as Pathfinders to mark targets with flares, and the German air defences.

People

- Charles Harold, 19, a navigator of No. 35 Squadron RAF, flying Mosquitos
- Werner Schaumann, 16, a loader of 826 FlaK Battery, a German 20mm anti-aircraft unit
- Jack Harris, 24, a pilot of No. 550 Squadron RAF flying Lancaster bombers

Equipment

- Avro Lancaster bomber NX611 Just Jane, shown taxiing under engine power
- A German wheeled 88mm gun in its anti-aircraft role

=== The Battle of the Bulge ===
In "The Battle of the Bulge", Murray looks at the German attempted counterattack through the Ardennes forest.

The episode looks in detail at the German plans for Operation Autumn Mist, their intended counter-attack using the cover of the Ardennes forest, following the Allied liberation of Antwerp in Belgium. It also examines German attempts to confuse Allied forces using Commandos of Panzer Brigade 150 disguised as American units, the battle fought around Bastogne by the American 101st Airborne Division, in particular Easy Company of the 502nd Infantry Regiment, and the subsequent Siege of Bastogne.

People

- Corporal Ludwig Lindemann, 19, of the German 26th Volksgrenadier Division, an infantryman involved in Autumn Mist and at Bastogne
- Victor Bouvy-Pesesse, 11, a resident of Bastogne who took refuge in a cellar

Equipment

- The German Jagdpanther tank destroyer
- The American M1 carbine, the infantry weapon used by the 101st Airborne at Bastogne

=== The Eastern Front ===
In "The Eastern Front", Murray again departs from Allied road to Berlin, to look at the Soviet advances from the east

It looks in detail at the Soviet offensive toward the River Vistula in Poland, aiming for the strategic objective of the valuable Silesia region, while German civilians evacuated en-masse in fear of the Soviet troops. It examines the Soviet encirclement of the city of Breslau and the ensuing 3-month siege, and the parallel advance up the River Oder towards Berlin.

People

- Nikolai Yakovlevich Zheleznov, 21, a Soviet tank commander in the 4th Tank Army
- Klavdia Andreevna Deriabina, 22, a bomber pilot of the Soviet all-female 588th Night Bomber Regiment, nicknamed the Night Witches by the Germans
- Evgeni Ivanovich Bessonov, 21, of the Soviet 4th Tank Army Commander, a tank rider whose role was to advance ahead of the T-34's removing the panzerfaust threat
- Ursula Waage, 16, a civilian of Breslau
- Unteroffizier Karl Huttenrauch, 21, of the German 20th Panzer Division, involved in the fighting along the Oder

Equipment

- The Soviet T-34 Tank
- The German panzerfaust, a handheld anti-tank weapon

=== Crossing the Rhine ===
In "Crossing the Rhine", Murray looks at the Allied advances across the Rhine, 9 months after D-Day.

It covers in detail the British plan for a large set-piece assault on Wesel led by Montgomery, with his American rival Patton planning crossings further south. It examines the fortunate discovery and ensuing battle for the Ludendorff Bridge at Remagen, by a company of the American 27th Armored Infantry Battalion, it being the only one of 47 crossings not blown up by the Germans. It also examines the other American crossings at Oppenheim, followed by the British 50 mile wide assault on the Rhine, Operation Plunder, opening up 6 bridgeheads, followed by Operation Varsity, a massive airborne assault to prevent a German retaliation from the woods behind Wasel.

People

- Sergeant Ralf Shackelford, 27, of the American 27th Armored Infantry Battalion, involved at the Ludendorff Bridge
- Karl Feldens, 7, one of many civilians who had been sent by the Germans to hide in the rail tunnel on the far side of the Ludendorff Bridge
- Sergeant Major Herbert Mallorie, 22, of the British No. 46 (Royal Marine) Commando, who crossed the Rhine in a Buffalo (Landing Vehicle Tracked)
- Sergeant Ted Eaglen, 20, of the British 6th Airborne Division, involved in the parachute landings in Operation Varsity

Equipment

- A DUKW amphibious vehicle

=== The Battle for Berlin ===
In "The Battle for Berlin", Murray looks at the last 300 miles of the British and American advance, and the Soviet advance into Berlin, effectively ending the war.

The episode looks in detail at the events of 15 April 1945, when British troops entered the Bergen-Belsen concentration camp to find hundreds of dead and dying prisoners, and the meetup of American and Soviet forces at the River Elbe on 25 April. It also examines the Battle for Berlin - the final Soviet encirclement and assault, and the Battle in Berlin, the street fighting phase culminating in the raising a flag over the Reichstag. It also details Hitler's last public appearance on 20 April, his suicide on 30 April, and the burning of his body.

People

- Leslie Hardman, a Military Chaplain and the senior Jewish Rabbi of the British 8th Corps, the first chaplain to enter Belsen, conducting the first funeral service over 5,000 person mass grave
- Pavel Borisovich Vinnik, 19, a machine gunner of the Soviet 5th Guards Army
- Oberscharführer Rochus Misch, part of the staff in Hitler's bunker

Equipment

- The ROKS flamethrowers, a portable flame thrower used by Soviet forces

== DVD release ==
The series was made available on DVD for the first time from 6 April 2009. The DVD was released by Revelation Films as a 2 disc 230 minutes volume, playable in Region 2.
