= Rough Science =

British television series

- Country of origin: United Kingdom
- Original language: English

Production
- Production company: British Broadcasting Corporation (BBC)

Rough Science is a British documentary reality television series made by the BBC in collaboration with the Open University. Six series were made between 2000 and 2005. It was broadcast in prime time on BBC Two and is considered something of a "break-out hit" for the Open University.

The series' formula consists of a group of four or five scientists with specialities in different fields who are given a task that they must complete using the natural resources of the surrounding area together with a small set of supplies. Each programme features a different task and follows the scientists as they use their knowledge and ingenuity in attempting to fulfil it and, in the process, educate the viewing public – despite failure being common.

Each episode either requires the team to work together in smaller groups to create requirements for the overall challenge, for the small groups to fulfil vaguely related challenges or even to complete the same task in competition. It has been set in a different scenic location each series, typically somewhere with plenty of plants for use by the group. The series is presented by Kate Humble, with most of the scientists appearing in several series.

== Series 1 ==
This series is set on the Mediterranean island of Capraia and features four episodes, and various tasks:

1. "Mediterranean Mystery" – The group is taken to a disused prison on the island where they have to determine the longitude and latitude of the island, create a radio from a saucepan and create an insect repellent.
2. "Simmering Shutterbugs" – Create a camera with film, create a compass and dye a flag.
3. "Power Supplies" – Generate power and build a pharmacy (creating antiseptic using olives and myrtle, and antiflatulent with fennel seeds).
4. "Sustenance and Sayonara" – Create soap and toothpaste (though the general task is to put food on the table).

The scientists featured are:

- Vanessa Griffiths, marine biologist and teacher of ecology
- Anna Lewington, ethnobotanist and author
- Jonathan Hare, chemist, physicist, inventor, and teacher
- Mike Leahy, virologist
- Mike Bullivant, organic photochemist

== Series 2 ==
This series takes place on the Caribbean island of Carriacou and features five scientists, including three (Mike Leahy, Mike Bullivant, and Jonathan Hare) from the first series. It has six episodes and many challenges:

1. "Mapping it Out" – Make a map of the island, paper and ink for the map, and a device to record sounds.
2. "Bugs and Barometers" – Make an antiseptic lotion, a microscope, and a weather station.
3. "Time and Transmitters" – Make a radio, clock, and kite.
4. "Feel the Heat" – Make a freezer, thermometer, and sunscreen.
5. "Sun and Sea" – Make a lamp that could function underwater, and to generate electrical energy to charge up a battery.
6. "The Science of Celebration" – Make musical instruments and fireworks for a party.

New scientists featured in this series were:

- Kathy Sykes, science communicator and physicist
- Ellen McCallie, ecologist and teacher

Anna Lewington and Vanessa Griffiths from the first series were not featured in this series.

== Series 3 ==
This series takes place on the West Coast of the South Island of New Zealand, has six episodes, and features the same scientists as the previous series.

1. "Gold Rush" – Collect gold from a river, build a metal detector, and construct a super-accurate balance.
2. "Shakers" – Build an automatic gold panning machine, create cosmetics, and look for evidence of earthquakes in trees.
3. "Quakers" – Build a waterproof tent and a seismograph.
4. "Ice" – Measure the speed and melting rate of a glacier and keep warm without a fire.
5. "Treasure Hunt" – Build a device for measuring altitude to assist in finding gold, and extract gold from rock.
6. "The Big Smelt" – Smelt the gold and craft a souvenir from it.

== Series 4 ==
This series takes place at Darwin Mine, adjacent to Death Valley National Park in California and has six episodes, all involving space exploration. Four scientists from the previous series (Ellen McCallie, Jonathan Hare, Mike Bullivant, and Kathy Sykes) are featured plus a new scientist, Iain Stewart, the show's first geologist. Mike Leahy from the previous series is not featured in this series.

1. "'Rover": Build a rover, find water and purify it.
2. "Communication": Send a communication in a way that didn't rely purely on sound (by altering the vibrations of reflected sunlight, which is then detected by a transistor functioning as a light detector), and make a pen that works in zero gravity.
3. "Spacesuit": Design a cooling system for a spacesuit.
4. "Impact": Measure the size of the meteor that created Barringer Meteor Crater. Iain and Kathy travel to Arizona to see the crater. Mike stays behind, and experiments with impact. Jonathan and Ellen make a telescope using an eyepiece and mirror they find in the chest given to them at the start of the episode (their task was to actually measure the size of a crater on the Moon).
5. "Aerial Surveyor": Build a device with a camera that could survey a large area from the air. Find the center of one of the largest earthquakes to hit America that took place back in 1872 in California, and estimate what it measured on the Richter scale. Mike creates a system that filters carbon dioxide, just as the astronauts of Apollo 13 were forced to do when an explosion ruptured an oxygen tank.
6. "Rocket": Design rockets that can launch an egg into the air and return it safely to earth. Three different rockets are attempted by three of the scientists, while the remaining two work on a parachute system.

== Series 5 ==
This series takes place on the coast of Zanzibar and has a strong ecological theme running through the challenges. The line-up of scientists is Ellen McCallie, Jonathan Hare, Mike Bullivant, and Kathy Sykes. The episode challenges for this series are:

1. "Shipwrecked" – Design and build a submersible exploration vehicle to explore a shipwreck, determine when low tide occurs for the best chance at getting to the wreck, and how to purify the scientists' water supply.
2. "Lost at Sea" – Build a distress flare, make an emergency flotation device, and create a warning light activated by seawater.
3. "Call of the Wild" – Const an underwater hydrophone, an underwater viewing device, and create mosquito repellent.
4. "To the Lighthouse" – Build a lighthouse by creating a light source visible from great distances while at sea, as well as create the lighthouse infrastructure and make the light flash.
5. "The Reef" – Create a system to protect a coral reef by alerting approaching boats that they're entering a protected area.
6. "Beneath the Waves" – Build a SCUBA device that can safely be used to a depth of 5 meters and still provide freedom for exploration.

== Series 6 ==
This series, shown in 2005, takes place in the San Juan Mountains in Colorado. For this series, geomorphologist Hermione Cockburn replaced Kathy Sykes.

1. "Power" – Supply electricity and natural gas to their basecamp, located in an old mill.
2. "Safety" – Build a fire extinguisher (using carbon dioxide) and a water treatment plant.
3. "Mountain" – Calculate the height and weight of a mountain and make sunglasses to protect the eyes at high altitudes.
4. "Clean" – Build a washing machine with washing soap, and create antiperspirant and deodorant.
5. "Mine" – Detect radioactive rocks and flammable gases, and create a generator to power an electric lamp.
6. "Photo" – Take and develop a photograph, and deliver it by hydrogen balloon.

== Channels ==
Rough Science was originally shown by the BBC and all six series have since been shown on Discovery Science (UK). Series 1–4 have been shown on PBS in the US, series 3–6 have been aired on TVNZ 6 in New Zealand and series 1–3 have been shown on TV3 in Catalonia, Spain.

== Publication ==
- DVDs are available of all six series.
- Series 3 and 4 were available through Netflix, but have been discontinued.
