= Leslie Hardman =

British army chaplain

Leslie Hardman MBE
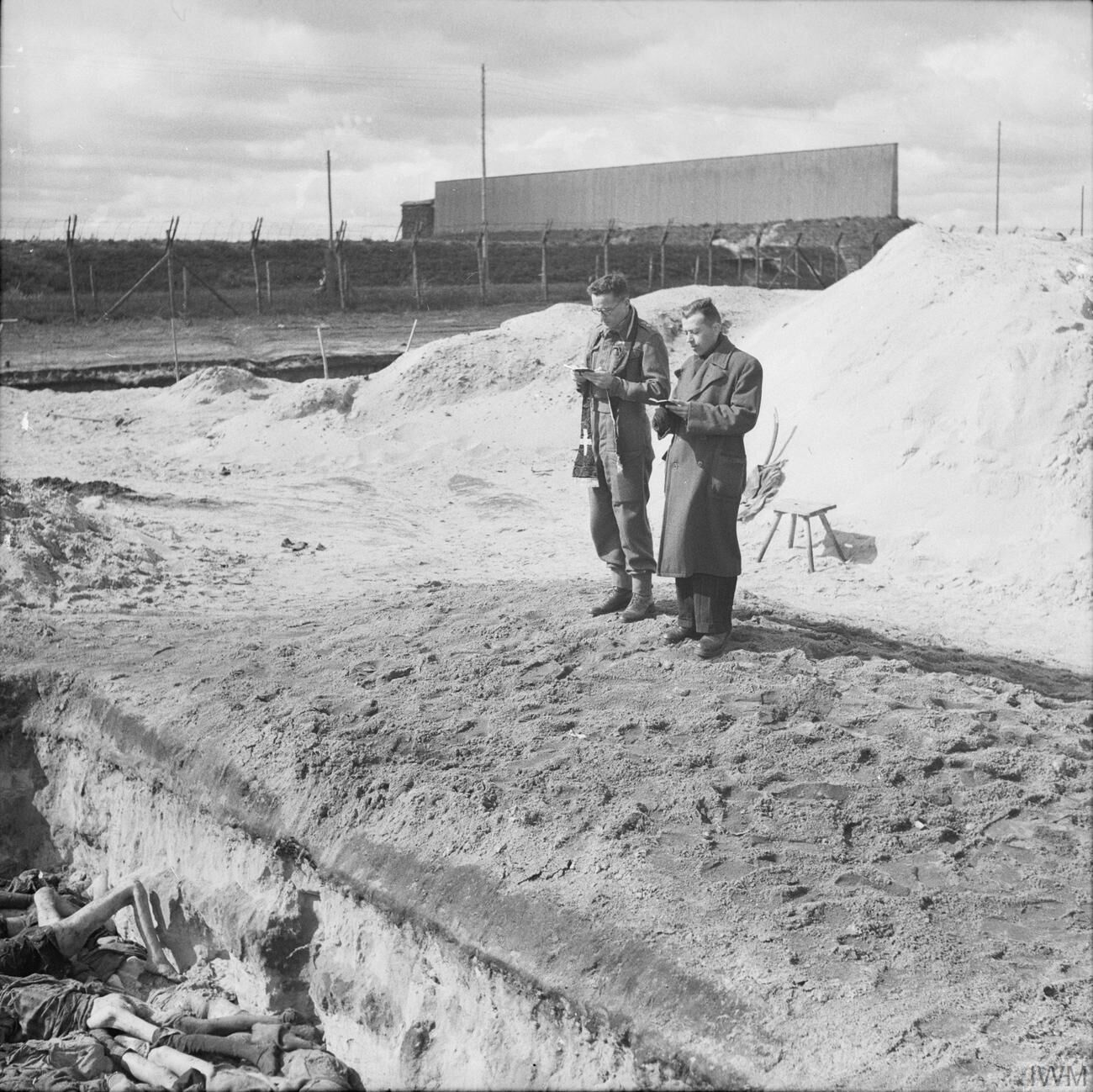
- Leslie Hardman, and Roman Catholic Padre Father M.C. Morrison, conduct a service over Mass Grave number 2 at Belsen before it is filled in. 25 April 1945

Personal life
- Born: 18 February 1913 Glynneath, Wales
- Died: 7 October 2008 (aged 95) London, England
- Spouse: Josi Cohen
- Children: Four
- Education: University of Leeds

Religious life
- Religion: Judaism
- Denomination: Orthodox

Reverend Leslie Henry Hardman MBE HCF (born 18 February 1913 – 7 October 2008) was an Orthodox Rabbi and the first Jewish British Army chaplain to enter Bergen-Belsen concentration camp, an experience "that made him a public figure, both within his community and outside it".

== Early life ==
He was born in Glynneath, Wales to Abraham and Dora Hartmann, who were Ashkenazi Jews from Poland and Russia, respectively. The couple worked as drapers and anglicised their name as 'Hardman'. At the outbreak of the First World War, Abraham, a subject of the Austro-Hungarian Empire, was interned as an enemy alien because Austria-Hungary was allied with Germany, then at war with the United Kingdom.

Dora and their three children relocated to Manchester for domestic support and were later reunited with Abraham after his release. Between 1916 and 1918, the couple had two more children, both born in Manchester. The family moved to Liverpool in 1922 where Leslie attended the Hebrew School in Hope Place. He subsequently studied at a yeshivah before enrolling at the University of Leeds, where he took his BA and then an MA. He married his wife Josi (1911–2007) on 14 October 1936, two years after becoming minister of the Jewish community at St. Anne's, where he was also the shochet, or ritual slaughterer. From there he took a ministerial appointment in Leeds.

== Bergen-Belsen ==
On the outbreak of the Second World War in September 1939, Hardman enlisted in the Army Chaplains' Department, being stationed in Hertfordshire with the East Central District of the Eastern Command. In the autumn of 1944 Hardman served in the Netherlands, where he learned of the atrocities perpetrated against Jews. There he became involved with members of the remaining Jewish community, and celebrated Hanukkah with them. From the Netherlands he was sent to Nazi Germany, where he remained until the end of the war. Unusually for a chaplain, he insisted on being armed while on active service.

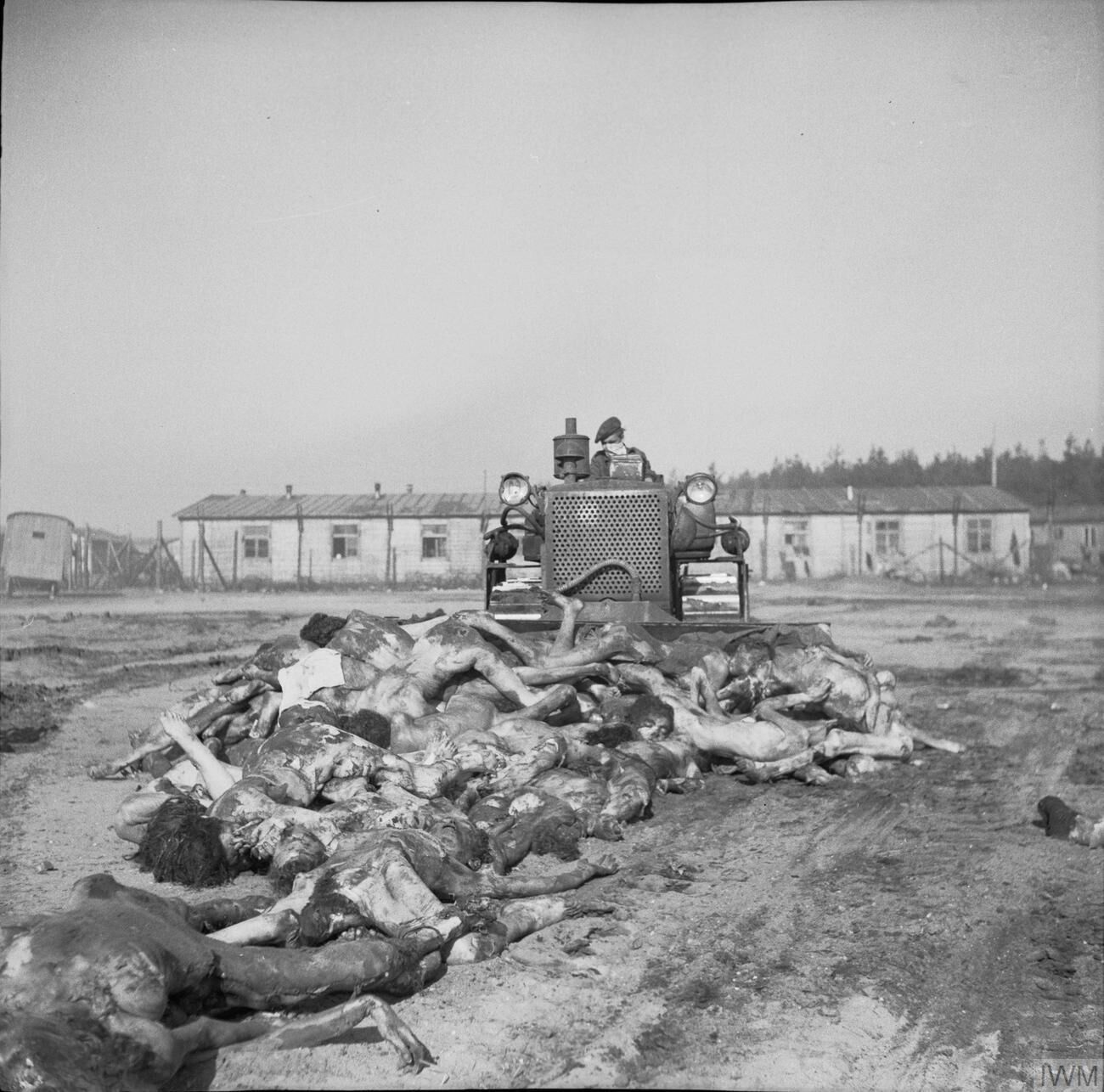
A British Army bulldozer pushes bodies into a mass grave at Belsen (19 April 1945)

By April 1945 Captain Hardman was the 32-year-old Senior Jewish Chaplain to the British Forces, attached to the 8th Corps of the British 2nd Army. On 17 April 1945, Hardman entered Bergen-Belsen concentration camp, two days after it had been liberated by British military forces, under the command of fellow Welshman Brigadier Glyn Hughes. Hardman became the first Jewish chaplain at the site. On arriving at the camp he tried to bring comfort to the survivors and said the Kaddish, the Jewish memorial prayer, over the dead. He tried to persuade the army bulldozer drivers who were pushing the bodies of the dead into a pit to bury them with some kind of dignity. Hardman supervised the burial of about 20,000 victims, "giving them the dignity in death of which they had been robbed in life".

Later he wrote of his experience at the camp,

"Towards me came what seemed to be the remnants of a holocaust – a staggering mass of blackened skin and bones, held together somehow with filthy rags. 'My God, the dead walk', I cried aloud, but I did not recognise my voice... [peering] at the double star, the emblem of Jewry on my tunice – one poor creature touched and then stroked the badge of my faith, and finding that it was real murmured, 'Rabbiner, Rabbiner'."

Years later, Hardman told a correspondent from the BBC (paraphrasing from Akdamus Milin),

"If all the trees in the world turned into pens, all the waters in the oceans turned into ink and the heavens turned into paper, it would still be insufficient material to describe the horrors these people suffered under the SS."

When Richard Dimbleby made a radio report of the Belsen liberation from the camp itself for the BBC, Hardman could be heard singing a hymn with two women in the background, one of whom died almost immediately after the recording was made. He circumcised Jewish babies who had been born in the camp as well as burying those who died. He conducted the marriage of a survivor and the British sergeant who had liberated her.

He was recorded as having said that he had lost his faith at Belsen. However, he later stated, "I didn't lose my faith, but some of the words of the prayers I said at Belsen stuck in my throat. I couldn't understand how the God I worshipped could permit this."

Hardman was present during the interrogation of Josef Kramer, the Commandant of Bergen-Belsen; Kramer's complete lack of remorse made a deep impression on him. Kramer would later be tried, and was hanged in December 1945.

== Later years ==
After the war Hardman served as the rabbi at Hendon United Synagogue from 1947 to 1982, and was the Hendon Branch Chaplain of the Association of Jewish Ex-Servicemen and Women. He also served as chaplain to the psychiatric unit at Edgware Hospital and was a strong supporter of the Holocaust Educational Trust.

Hardman was a member of the 43 Group, a militant anti-fascist organisation founded by Jewish ex-servicemen. The group's activities mostly involved physically disrupting fascist street preaching and private meetings, however Hardman was not directly involved in this, mainly offering the other members moral support and pastoral care.

Early in the 1960s the North Western Reform Synagogue invited a young German pastor and some teenage members of his church to visit their congregation in London. Hardman was reported in the Jewish Chronicle as having criticised the invitation on the grounds that it was inappropriate. In response, the synagogue's rabbi, Dow Marmur, invited Hardman to attend a public meeting that had been organised to welcome them. Upon hearing the pastor, Hardman was given an opportunity to address the audience. His first words were: "Ladies and Gentlemen, I want to apologise."

In 1995 Hardman was invited to conduct the service to commemorate the 50th anniversary of the liberation of Ravensbrück concentration camp. He was also frequently called on by American groups to speak at Holocaust conferences. At one such event the rabbis presented him with an American rabbinical certificate, a presentation which had been denied him by Jews College, the leading rabbinical seminary in London, "for political reasons", he claimed.

Hardman was interviewed by Al Murray at Bergen Belsen for the 2004 documentary Al Murray's Road To Berlin. In the 2007 Channel 4 drama The Relief of Belsen Hardman was portrayed by actor Paul Hilton. Hardman did not watch the programme, but said of it,

"One member of my congregation complained that I was seen in it without a kippa. Can you imagine that? There I was, burying thousands of bodies, and all this man cared about was that I wasn't wearing a hat."

Hardman was appointed MBE in 1998 for his services to the Jewish community, and in 1995 was honoured by the Simon Wiesenthal Museum of Tolerance in Los Angeles. He was also a Freemason. In January 2008 he gave a speech at the National Holocaust Memorial Day commemoration in Liverpool.

Leslie Hardman died on 7 October 2008 aged 95.

== Publications ==
- Hardman, Leslie and Cecily Goodman 'The Survivors: the story of the Belsen Remnant' London: Vallentine, Mitchell, (1958)
- Hardman, Leslie (contributor) Belsen in History and Memory By Jo Reilly, Joanne Reilly Published by Routledge, (1997) ISBN 0-7146-4767-5
