= Michael Morrison (priest) =

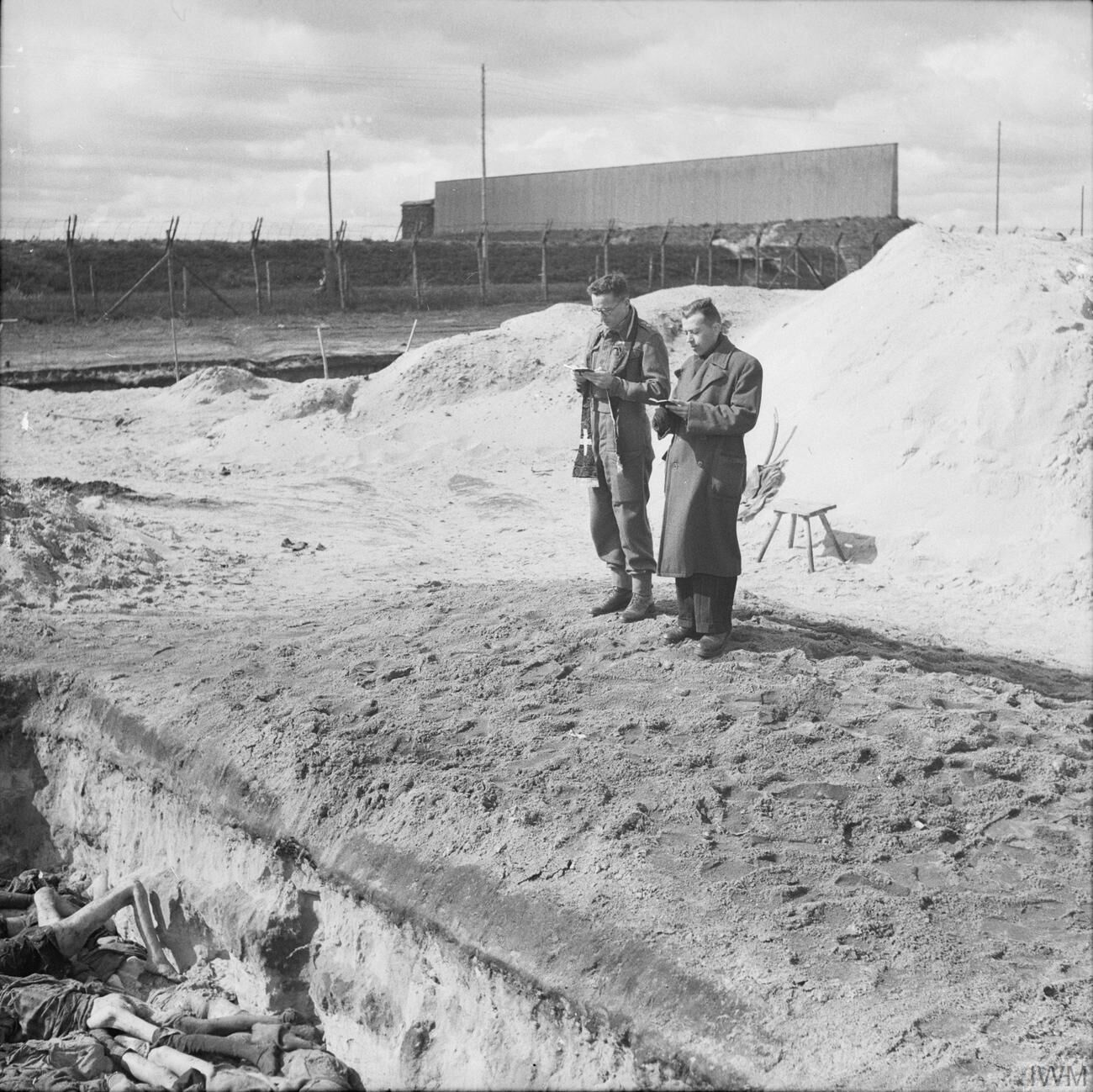
Michael Morrison, and Jewish British Army Chaplain Leslie Hardman, conduct a joint service over Mass Grave number 2 at Belsen before it is filled in. 25 April 1945

Father Michael Morrison (October 1908, Listowel, County Kerry, Ireland, U.K. - April 1973, Dublin, Ireland) was an Irish Jesuit priest. Educated at Sexton St. Christian Brothers, and at the Jesuit Mungret College, Limerick, he trained as a Jesuit Priest in St Stanislaus College, Tullabeg, Co. Offaly from 1925, and was ordained on 31 July 1939.

He was teaching at Belvedere College when in 1941 during the Second World War, the British army called on Irish priests to serve as chaplains.

He was a British Army chaplain associated with the Allied liberation of Belsen, a notorious death camp in April 1945. He made the camp into a centre for daily Holy Mass. Several people of varying religious persuasions attended his services.

Following the war, he went to Australia working as a teacher.

He collapsed while walking up the stairs in Belvedere House and died in Jervis Street Hospital soon after in April 1973. He is buried in Glasnevin Cemetery, Dublin.
