= How to Grow a Planet =

2012 BBC documentary television series

- Genre: Nature documentary
- Directed by: Nick Shoolingin-Jordan; Nigel Walk
- Presented by: Iain Stewart
- Composer: Paul Leonard-Morgan
- Country of origin: United Kingdom
- Original language: English
- No. of seasons: 1
- No. of episodes: 3

Production
- Executive producer: Mark Hedgecoe
- Producer: Andrew Thompson (series producer)
- Running time: 59 minutes
- Production company: BBC Productions

Original release
- Network: BBC Two
- Release: 7 February – 21 February 2012

How to Grow a Planet is a 2012 television nature documentary series produced by the BBC on and originally broadcast on BBC Two. It is presented by Professor Iain Stewart and ran for three 60 minute episodes in February 2012. It covers the role of plants in shaping the planet, altering the atmosphere, the evolution of ecological relationships and their role in shaping human evolution.

== Episodes ==
No.	Title	Director	Producer	Original air date (UK)
1	"Life from Light"	Nick Shoolingin-Jordan	Nick Shoolingin-Jordan	7 February 2012
2	"The Power of Flowers"	Nigel Walk	Nigel Walk	14 February 2012
3	"The Challenger"	Nick Shoolingin-Jordan	Nick Shoolingin-Jordan	21 February 2012

== Merchandise ==
A single-disc DVD set of the series was released on 16 April 2012.
