= Mike Bullivant =

British organic photochemist

Dr Mike Bullivant is a British organic photochemist known for his appearances on all six series of BBC's Rough Science, which was nominated for a BAFTA in 2000. Bullivant studied Chemistry at the University of Wales (Cardiff) and attained a PhD in organic photochemistry at the Universities of Cardiff and Nottingham.

Bullivant also presented the BBC/Open University series The Chemistry of Almost Everything which, in 1996, was the first Open University series to be shown in a prime-time slot, rather than the usual overnight slots traditionally reserved for OU broadcasts.

Bullivant was awarded an honorary Master of the University degree by the Open University in 2007 for his “significant contribution to the education and culture of Milton Keynes”

Bullivant contributed to Happy Birthday OU: 50 years of the Open University, a programme made by the BBC to commemorate the institution’s 50th birthday in 2019.
