= Earth: The Power of the Planet =

2007 British documentary TV series

- Earth: The Power of the Planet DVD cover
- Also known as: Earth: The Biography
- Genre: Documentary
- Presented by: Iain Stewart
- Country of origin: United Kingdom
- Original language: English
- No. of seasons: 1
- No. of episodes: 5

Production
- Executive producer: Phil Dolling
- Running time: 60 minutes

Original release
- Network: BBC Two
- Release: 20 November – 18 December 2007

Earth: The Power of the Planet is a British documentary television series that premiered on BBC Two on 20 November 2007. The five-part series is presented by geologist Iain Stewart.

In the United States, the series was broadcast in 2008 on the National Geographic Channel as Earth: The Biography.

During filming in Madagascar, a new species of ant was discovered by Brian Fisher and named after Stewart: Cerapachys iainstewarti.

== Episodes ==
| No. | Title | Original release date |
|---|---|---|
| 1 | "Volcano" | 20 November 2007 |
| 2 | "Atmosphere" | 27 November 2007 |
| 3 | "Ice" | 4 December 2007 |
| 4 | "Oceans" | 11 December 2007 |
| 5 | "Rare Earth" | 18 December 2007 |

== Merchandise ==
A two-disc DVD of the series was released on 14 January 2008, followed by a two-disc Blu-ray set of the series being made available on 15 September 2008.

A 240-page hardcover book written by Iain Stewart and John Lynch (ISBN 978-0563539148) covering the topics seen in the episodes was released prior to the series being broadcast on 18 October 2007.

== See also ==
- Earth Story
- How the Earth Was Made
