= Mike Leahy =

Michael Brian Leahy (born 13 July 1966) is a British scientist, environmental campaigner and television presenter, known for his series Bite Me on the National Geographic Channel.

Leahy grew up in Steventon, Oxfordshire, and attended John Mason Comprehensive School in Abingdon. He left school at 15 and worked for ten years as a motor mechanic.

He was then a student at both Oxford Brookes University and Oxford University, where he gained a D.Phil in Virology and Molecular Biology.

In his 30s, Leahy gave up his job as a researcher to become a full-time television presenter, presenting three series of the BBC's Rough Science. This was followed by several TV series for the BBC including Bodysnatchers on BBC1, Labrats, SARS: the True Story, Pandemics: a Horizon Guide, The World's Top Ten Natural Disasters and others. Following a short period presenting science, travel and wildlife shows for BSkyB, Leahy moved to the National Geographic Channel, where perhaps he is best known for the series Bite Me. For this, Leahy needed to visit 25 locations in eight countries, facing snakes, fish, bugs and parasites. He was hospitalised several times and almost died after suffering an anaphylactic reaction when he was bitten by South American fire ants. The series first aired in November 2009 and is still showing on Amazon Prime and around the world.
