= Bite Me with Dr. Mike =

- Genre: Reality
- Presented by: Mike Leahy
- Composer: Leyton Leyton
- Country of origin: United States
- Original language: English
- No. of seasons: 1
- No. of episodes: 8

Production
- Executive producers: David E. Gerber; Andrew Waterworth
- Cinematography: Giles E. Pike
- Editor: Marilyn Copland
- Camera setup: Single-camera
- Running time: 45–48 minutes
- Production company: Natural History New Zealand

Original release
- Network: Travel Channel
- Release: June 23 – August 11, 2009

Bite Me with Dr. Mike is an American television show broadcast on The Travel Channel hosted by Dr. Mike Leahy. The show has eight episodes. The first episode was made available for free in iTunes on June 23, 2009.

== Premise ==
Virologist Dr. Mike Leahy showcases some of Earth's most dangerous and often tiny creatures that may be a surprise for travelers. Dr. Leahy will go to the furthest extent to understand these creatures by letting them bite, sting, or feed on his body. The show premiered on the Travel Channel Tuesday, June 23 at 10 E/P/9 C.

== Host ==
Former motorcycle mechanic of ten years, Mike Leahy, decided to go back to school to pursue his interest in bugs. Dr Leahy completed his Ph.D. in Virology and Molecular Biology while at Oxford University.

== Episodes ==
No.	Title	Original release date
1	"Brazil"	June 23, 2009
Virologist Mike Leahy explores Brazil, home to thousands of potential health hazards. From fire ants and invisible worms to the legendary candiru fish, Dr. Mike puts his body on the line to reveal what makes human hosts so attractive to these creatures.
2	"India"	June 30, 2009
Join Dr. Mike as he bravely dips in the Ganges, endures leech therapy and meets some cranky monkeys with a thirst for blood. He'll also visit Varanasi--India's spiritual and cultural heart.
3	"Vietnam"	July 7, 2009
From the chaotic city streets of Hanoi and Ho Chi Minh, to exotic jungles and picturesque paddy fields, there's a lot to be on guard against in Vietnam for inquisitive virologist and daring explorer Dr. Mike Leahy.
4	"Australian Outback"	July 14, 2009
With average temperatures of around 100 degrees, the Outback is home to some of the planet's smallest but most lethal inhabitants. Dr. Mike explores an eight-legged murderess and a parasite that can turn man's best friend into a killer.
5	"Borneo"	July 21, 2009
Dr. Mike Leahy travels to Borneo where he learns the hard way that everything is out to get you, whether trekking through the forest, climbing a mountain, exploring a 65-million-year-old cave system or cruising through the mangrove swamp.
6	"Coastal Australia"	July 28, 2009
Dr. Mike explores Coastal Australia, which looks like paradise with dense rainforests and white sandy beaches. But it's also packed full of potentially painful and poisonous creatures - an ideal destination for a virologist who loves all things weird.
7	"Mexico"	August 4, 2009
Mexico is virologist Mike Leahy's dream destination. This exotic North American country is home to a host of tiny terrors whose size defies their capacity to damage your holiday plans - and your insides - in an instant.
8	"Florida/Arizona"	August 11, 2009
From the Everglades of Florida to the deserts of Southern Arizona, Dr. Mike's latest vacation tests his endurance in more ways than one. He goes stormwater drain diving and takes a shot in the head with a deadly toxin.
