= Helen Czerski =

British science writer and television presenter

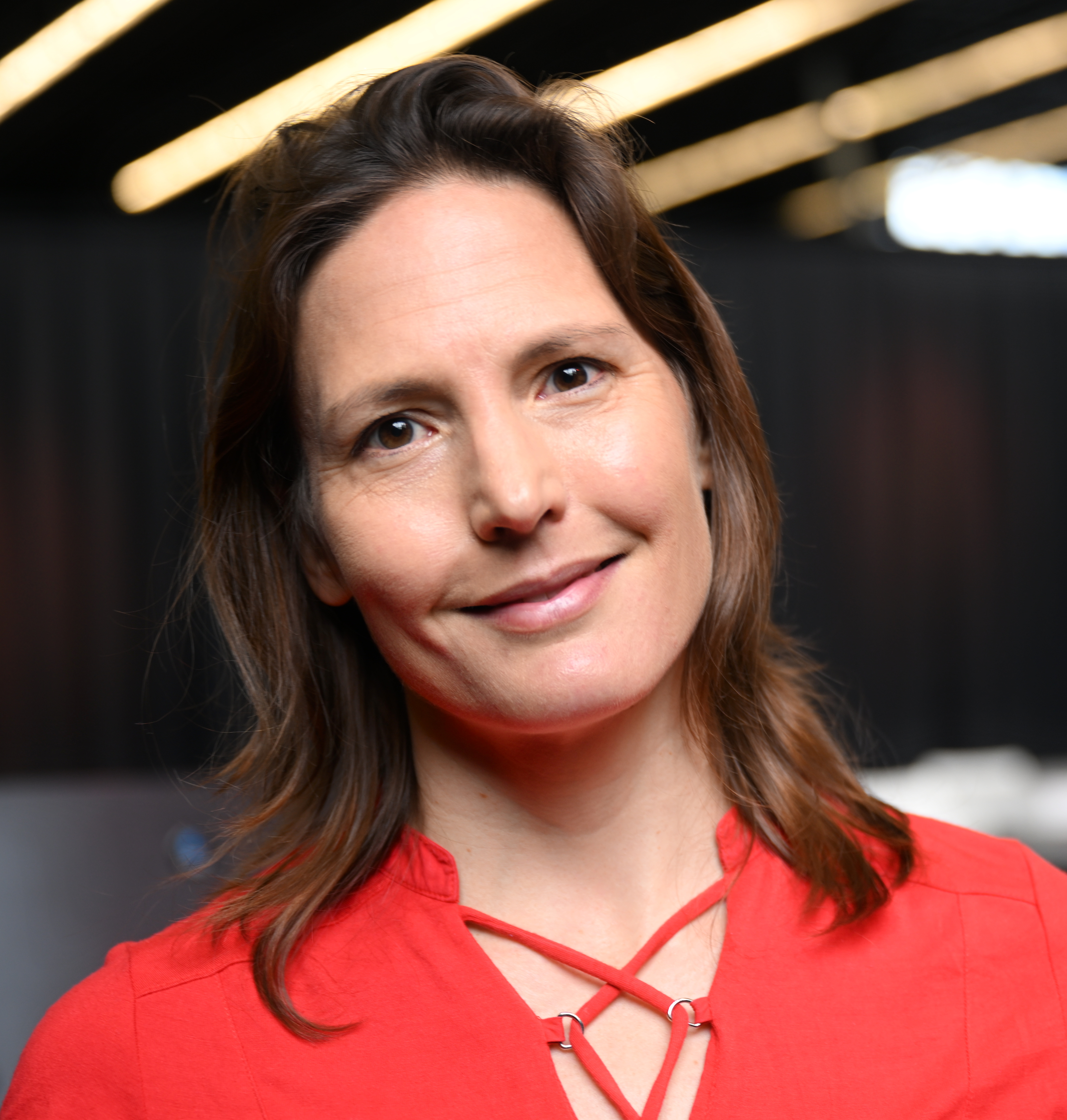
- Czerski in 2022
- Born: 1 November 1978 (age 47); Manchester, England
- Education: Altrincham Grammar School for Girls; University of Cambridge (MA, PhD)
- Known for: Oceanography; Television presenter
- Scientific career
- Workplaces: University of Cambridge; University of Toronto; Los Alamos National Laboratory; Scripps Institution of Oceanography; Graduate School of Oceanography (University of Rhode Island); University of Southampton; University College London
- Thesis: Ignition of HMX and RDX (2006)
- Helen Czerski's voice Recorded October 2017
- Website: www.helenczerski.net

Helen Czerski (born 1 November 1978) is a British science writer and broadcaster. She has presented numerous television and radio programmes since 2012, mainly for the BBC, and has written three books and regular columns.

She is Professor of the Environment and Society in the department of mechanical engineering at University College London. She was previously at the Institute of Sound and Vibration Research at the University of Southampton. Her published research is in the field of oceanography.

== Early life and education ==
Czerski was brought up in Altrincham, Greater Manchester, and educated at Altrincham Grammar School for Girls. She graduated from the University of Cambridge where she was a student at Churchill College, with Master of Arts and Master of Science degrees in Natural Sciences (Physics) and a PhD in experimental explosives physics, particularly Research Department Explosive (RDX).

== Career ==
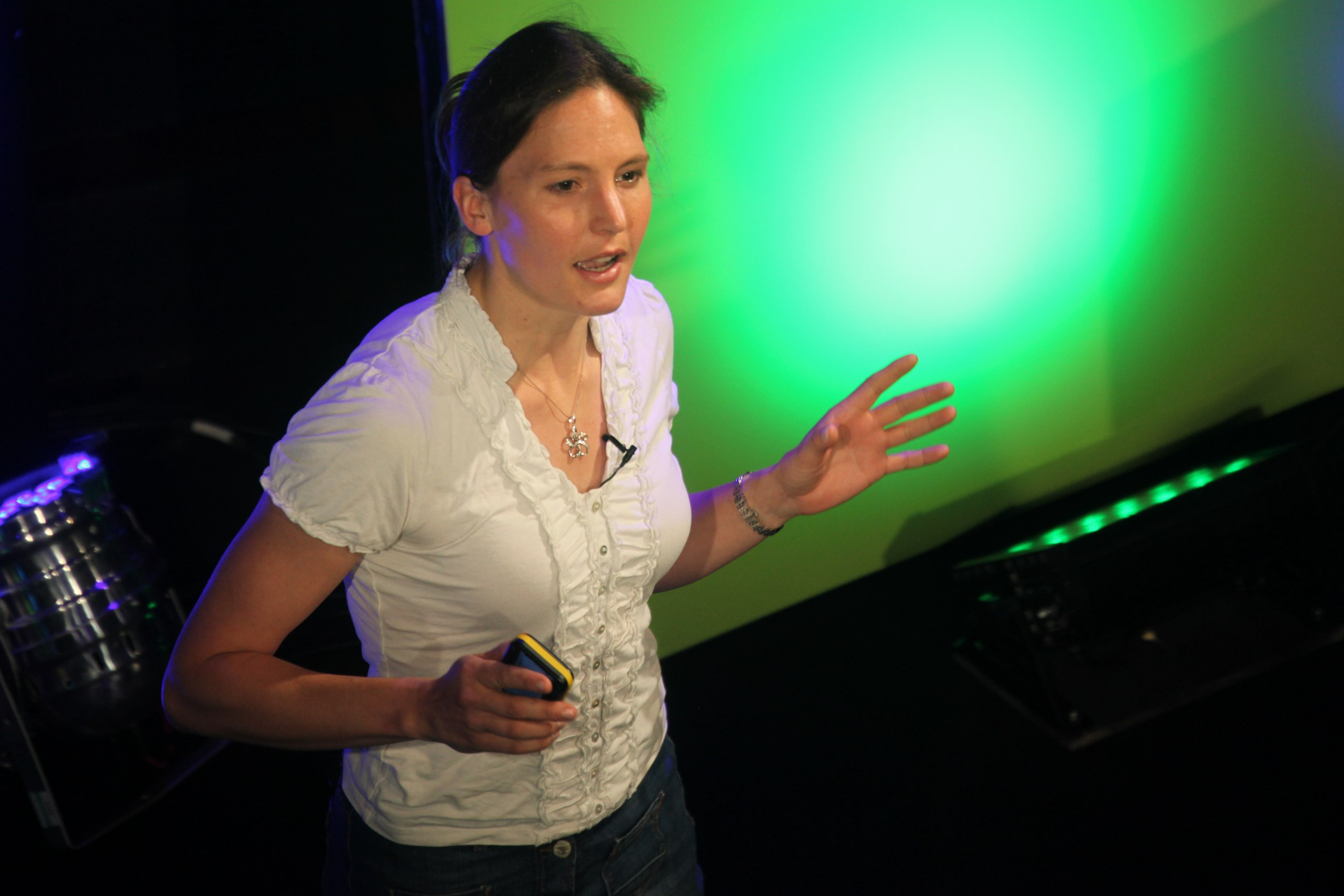
Czerski at Thinking Digital in 2012

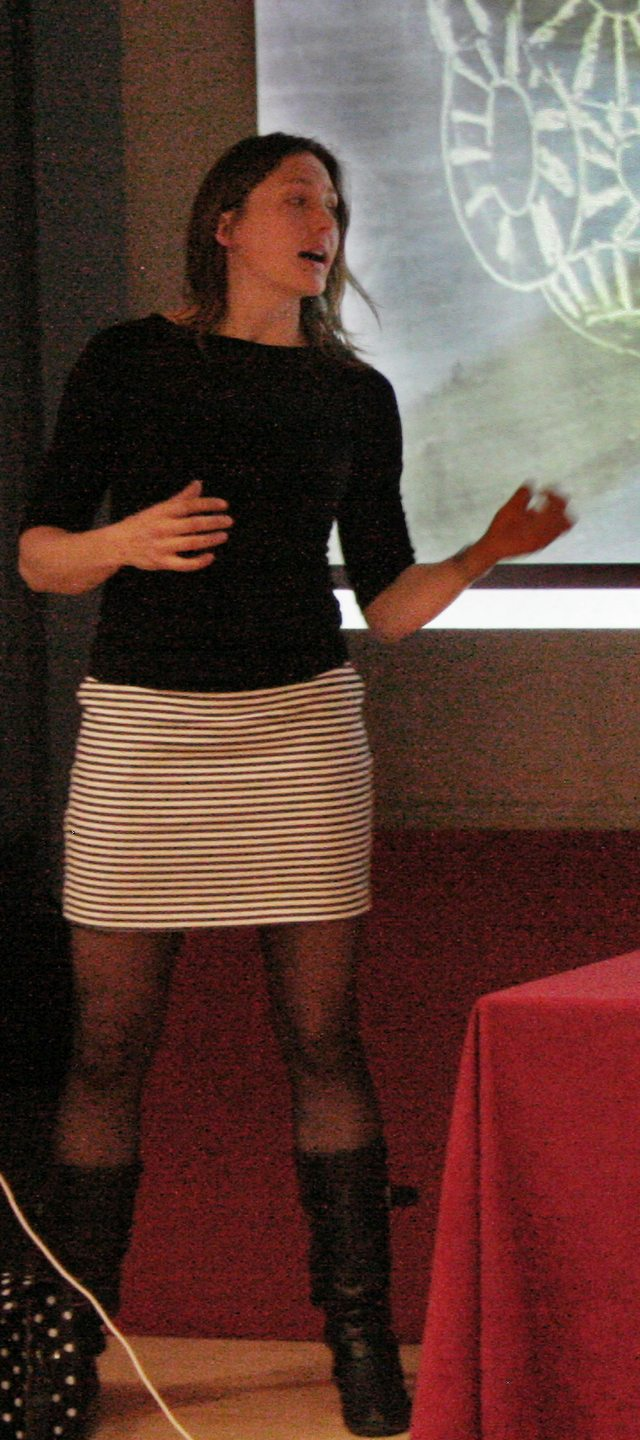
Czerski at the 2013 Cambridge Science Festival

Czerski was a regular science presenter for the BBC. Her programmes have included:

- Orbit: Earth's Extraordinary Journey, a three-part series on BBC Two, March 2012, co-presented with Kate Humble.
- Operation Iceberg, a two-part series on BBC Two, October 2012.
- The Transit of Venus, BBC Two, June 2012, Horizon.
- Stargazing Challenges, BBC Two.
- Dara Ó Briain's Science Club, BBC Two.
- The Secret Life of the Sun, BBC Two, July 2013.
- Pop! The Science of Bubbles, BBC Four, April 2013.
- The £10 Million Challenge, a Horizon which launched the Longitude Prize 2014.
- What's Wrong with Our Weather?, July 2014, Horizon, co-presented with meteorologist John Hammond, which examined the possible causes of Britain's recent extreme weather and what connects all the recent extreme winters.
- Super Senses: The Secret Power of Animals, August 2014, a three-part series for BBC Two.
- Colour: The Spectrum of Science, November 2015, a three-part series for BBC Four on the 15 colours that tell the story of the Earth, life and scientific discovery.
- Dangerous Earth, November 2016, a six-part series for the BBC showing how new camera technology is revealing the inner workings of the Earth's most spectacular natural wonders.
- The Infinite Monkey Cage - "The Science of Everyday Life", BBC Radio 4, 16 January 2017.
- Sound Waves: The Symphony of Physics, March 2017, a two-part series.
- From Ice to Fire: The Incredible Science of Temperature, February 2018, a three-part series.
- WMG Future Batteries | Fully Charged, 20 February 2019.
- Ocean Autopsy: The Secret Story of Our Seas, June 2020, a 90-minute film.
- Royal Institution Christmas Lectures - Planet Earth: A user's guide, December 2020, BBC Four series

She has also appeared on The Museum of Curiosity (BBC Radio 4) and is an occasional presenter of the web TV and podcast show Fully Charged. She regularly appears on The Cosmic Shambles Network and co-hosts their podcasts and web series Science Shambles and They've Made Us with Robin Ince. Until September 2024, Czerski was a regular contributor to the Wall Street Journal in the column "Everyday Physics". She is the co-host, along with Tom Heap, of Rare Earth, BBC Radio 4's premier show on the environment.

=== Awards ===
External media

Audio
- "Episode 1, Dr Helen Czerski & Clive Thompson", Ada Lovelace Day Podcast

Video
- "Bubble Physicist Helen Czerski", University of Rhode Island
- "CS4 Interview: Helen Czerski ", University of Southampton

For her "Everyday Science" column in BBC Focus magazine, Czerski was shortlisted for columnist of the year at the 2014 PPA Awards. In 2018 Czerski won the William Thomson, Lord Kelvin Medal and Prize from the Institute of Physics for her contributions to championing the physics of everyday life to a worldwide audience of millions through TV programmes, a popular science book, newspaper columns, and public talks. Czerski was made an Honorary Fellow of Churchill College, Cambridge in 2020. She received an Honorary Doctorate in Science from the University of East Anglia in 2023.

The Italian translation of Storm in a Teacup: The Physics of Everyday Life won the third edition (2018) of the Premio ASIMOV (Asimov award) for the best book in scientific dissemination published in Italy, and Blue Machine: How the Ocean Shapes Our World won the 2024 Wainwright Prize for Writing on Conservation.

=== Research ===
Czerski's research focuses on temperature, ocean bubbles, bubble acoustics, air-sea gas transfer and ocean bubble optics.

== Publications ==
- —— (2016). Storm in a Teacup: The Physics of Everyday Life. Bantam Press. ISBN 0-593-07542-0.
- —— (2018). Bubbles. Illustrated by Chris Moore. London: Ladybird Books. ISBN 978-0-7181-8829-0.
- —— (2023). Blue Machine: How the Ocean Shapes Our World. London: Transworld Publishers. ISBN 978-1-911709-10-7.
