= Time Scanners =

- Starring: Dallas Campbell; Steve Burrows
- Country of origin: United States
- No. of seasons: 2
- No. of episodes: 6

Production
- Running time: 52 minutes
- Production company: Atlantic Productions

Original release
- Network: PBS
- Release: July 1, 2014 – December 23, 2015

Time Scanners is a program that aired on PBS with hosts Dallas Campbell and Steve Burrows. Time Scanners laser scans historical buildings with the hope of investigating various features about them. Time Scanners debuted on July 1, 2014, on PBS as a three-part series. It currently airs in reruns on the National Geographic Channel with 10 minutes removed for commercials.

== Series overview ==
Season	Episodes	Originally released	
Season	Episodes	First released	Last released
1	3	July 1, 2014	July 15, 2014
2	3	December 9, 2015	December 23, 2015

== Episodes ==
=== Season 1 (2014) ===
No. overall	No. in season	Title	Original release date	U.S. viewers
1	1	"Egyptian Pyramids"	July 1, 2014	N/A
The Time Scanners visit the Egyptian Pyramids.
2	2	"St Paul’s Cathedral"	July 8, 2014	N/A
The Time Scanners visit St Paul's Cathedral in London.
3	3	"Petra"	July 15, 2014	N/A
The Time Scanners visit the ancient city of Petra in Jordan. They run a georadar over the flat area in front of The Monastery.

=== Season 2 (2015) ===
No. overall	No. in season	Title	Original release date	U.S. viewers
4	1	"Machu Picchu"	December 9, 2015	N/A
The Time Scanners visit Machu Picchu in Peru. They study the water supply of the city.
5	2	"Colosseum"	December 16, 2015	N/A
The Time Scanners visit the Colosseum in Rome.
6	3	"Jerusalem"	December 23, 2015	N/A
The Time Scanners visit Jerusalem in Israel.
