= Wild Things (game show) =

- Genre: Game show
- Presented by: Kate Humble; Jason Byrne
- Country of origin: United Kingdom
- Original language: English
- No. of series: 3
- No. of episodes: 26

Production
- Running time: 60 minutes (inc. adverts)
- Production companies: IWC Media, Group M Entertainment and Mad Monk

Original release
- Network: Sky 1
- Release: 15 March 2015 – 14 May 2017

Wild Things is a wildlife-themed game show which is hosted by Kate Humble and Jason Byrne. It was commissioned in August 2014 by Sky 1 and first aired on 15 March 2015.

== Format ==
The gameshow features four teams of two people (relatives or couples) completing challenges on a woodland obstacle course (based in Rushmere Country Park in Bedfordshire) in order to win gold coins. One member of the team has to wear a mascot costume of a large woodland animal such as an Owl, Deer, Duck, Badger, Mole, Fox, Rabbit or Squirrel and from Series 2, Chicken, Wolf or Beaver; thus "becoming" the wild thing. The costumes are absent of vision, so the second team member must serve as their guide. The four teams compete against each other in order to win a cash prize of £10,000 and escape from The Wild Wood.

The team with the most points complete the final challenge which features the Wild Thing holding onto a suitcase with the prize money inside while being guided by their teammate (who is locked in a shed near the gates to get out of the Wild Wood) via a camera attached to the costume to travel to the shed to free their teammate by pressing a red button outside the shed. However, the camera only stays on for thirty seconds and also the other Wild Things led by their teammates try to stop them. If one of the other Wild Things catch up and catch the winning Wild Thing before they free their teammate, they win the money instead.

In Series 3, the format changed slightly. Unlike the first two series, where only four out of six teams could enter the Wild Wood to take part, in this series, all six teams enter with the team with the lowest score getting eliminated in each game. Also unlike the first and second series, where they were in-vision presenters, Humble and Byrne now only narrate the show. Each episode of Series 3 also features a game involving celebrities competing against each other.

== Transmissions ==
Series	Start date	End date	Episodes
1	15 March 2015	19 April 2015	6
2	10 April 2016	12 June 2016	10
3	12 March 2017	14 May 2017	10
