= The Route Masters: Running London's Roads =

2013 BBC documentary series

- Also known as: The Route Masters: Keeping London Moving
- Genre: Factual
- Directed by: Frankie Fathers; Matt Pelly; Clare Johns; Kathryn Tregidgo; Simon Gilchrist; James Ross; Arthur Cary
- Narrated by: Julian Barratt
- Composer: Sam Hooper
- Country of origin: United Kingdom
- Original language: English
- No. of series: 1
- No. of episodes: 6 (list of episodes)

Production
- Executive producers: Emma Willis; Edmund Coulthard; Alistair Pegg
- Producer: Simon Gilchrist
- Production location: London
- Running time: 60 minutes
- Production company: Blast! Films

Original release
- Network: BBC Two; BBC Two HD
- Release: 18 June 2013 – 2 February 2014

The Route Masters: Running London's Roads is a British documentary television series produced by Blast! Films for the BBC. Narrated by Julian Barratt, the series launched on BBC Two on 18 June 2013. The series shows how Transport for London keeps London's traffic moving.

== Production ==
On 6 June 2013 Janice Hadlow, the controller of BBC Two, announced the series along with several other documentaries. The series was filmed over a year.

The series is now repeated on Watch.

== Episode list ==
No.	Title	Directed by	Original release date	UK viewers (millions)
1	"Gridlock"	Frankie Fathers	18 June 2013	2.45
How Transport for London staff deal with pregnant motorists, road accidents and the Vauxhall helicopter crash in 2013.
2	"Night Bus"	Matt Pelly	25 June 2013	1.90
How night buses are coping as London's population and road traffic continues to increase.
3	"On the Buses"	Clare Johns and Kathryn Tregidgo	2 July 2013	1.96
Following London's bus drivers as they deal with more passengers than ever before.
4	"Gateway to London"	Simon Gilchrist	16 July 2013	1.87
How Victoria Coach Station has been transformed.
5	"The Future"	James Ross	23 July 2013	1.95
How Transport for London is trying to get people to use bikes and buses instead of cars.
6	"Fighting Crime"	Arthur Cary	2 February 2014	1.51
A look at Transport for London's special unit within the Metropolitan Police.

== Reception ==
=== Ratings ===
The first episode attracted 2.45 million viewers for BBC Two. It was watched by 10.7% of television viewers during its original broadcast. The second episode was viewed by 1.9 million people, attaining an 8.2% share of the audience during broadcast. The third episode was viewed by 1.96 million people, with an audience share of 8%. The fourth episode received 1.87 million viewers, an 8.3% share during broadcast. The penultimate episode was watched by 1.95 million people, with an audience share of 8.2%.

=== Critical reception ===
==== Episode 1 ====
Writing in The Independent, Tom Sutcliffe was disappointed by the way the events were presented and said that the episode "was saved by its characters". Keith Watson of the Metro said that the episode "may have intended to arouse our sympathy for those who keep our streets moving – it didn't". The Guardian's John Crace said that the episode "did have its moments" and that the gridlock theme was "hard to make interesting – and it wasn't very." David Crawford said that Airport Live should have been more like this episode, where you "find the one person who can describe well the complexities of the job, to give you the nuts and bolts of your doc; then find all the characters among the workers who perform the myriad tasks" to make it more interesting. Phil Harrison said that the episode was "perfectly watchable but, with the best will in the world, very missable too".

==== Episode 2 ====
Bim Adewunmi, writing for the New Statesman, said the episode "was simply excellent" and that London was "nowhere more beautifully portrayed than on BBC2's The Route Masters: Running London's Roads". Bryan Scott wrote a guide in the Metro on whom to avoid on the night bus home based on this episode.

==== Episode 3 ====
Writing in The Independent, Tom Sutcliffe said that the episode "was much funnier and sweeter than the original [Episode 1]".

==== Episode 4 ====
The Express & Star said the episode "provided a fascinating insight into one of the country's busiest stations showing you the hard work that goes into ensuring journeys run smoothly and keeping the city moving".

=== DVD ===
The Route Masters: Running London's Roads was released onto DVD by Delta Entertainment on 25 August 2014.

== See also ==
- The Tube (2012 TV series)
- London Buses
- Transport for London red routes
