= Ludo Graham =

British television producer and director

James Edward Ludovic Graham (born 26 May 1961, Scarborough) is a British television producer and director.

== Career ==
Graham produced the four-part documentary series The Choir for BBC Two, which won a BAFTA Award for best feature at the British Academy Television Awards 2007. His first major work was as director of the three-part TV series Strictly Supernatural, narrated by Christopher Lee and with consulting astrologer Robert Currey, for the Discovery Channel and DVD release in 1997. Graham went on to produce series such as Paddington Green for BBC1 in 1998 a historical reality TV series That'll Teach 'Em for Channel 4 and Road to Berlin featuring the journey of pub landlord Al Murray through the last stages of World War II for the Discovery Channel.

== Personal life ==
Graham has been married to TV presenter Kate Humble since 1992. In 2007, they moved to Monmouthshire and live on a working farm in the Wye Valley.

== Filmography ==
- Museum of Life (2010) TV series documentary – executive producer
- Montezuma (2009) TV documentary – executive producer
- Rivers with Griff Rhys Jones (2009) BBC TV series documentary – executive producer
- Being ... Neil Armstrong (2009) TV documentary – executive producer
- Top Dogs: Adventures in War, Sea and Ice (2009) – executive producer
- Trouble in Amish Paradise (2009) TV documentary – executive producer
- Apollo Wives (2009) TV documentary – executive producer
- Crime and Punishment (2008) TV series – director & producer
- The Choir (2006) TV series documentary – series producer & director
- Road to Berlin (2004) TV mini-series documentary – series producer
- Time Commanders (2003) TV series documentary – series producer
- Castle (2003) TV mini-series documentary – director& producer
- Alaskan Wilds (2003) TV mini-series documentary – producer
- Paddington Green (1998) BBC TV series – producer
- Strictly Supernatural (1997) Discovery TV series – director
- Hit Man & Her (1992) ITV late-night music series – producer & director
