= Kate Humble =

British television presenter and narrator

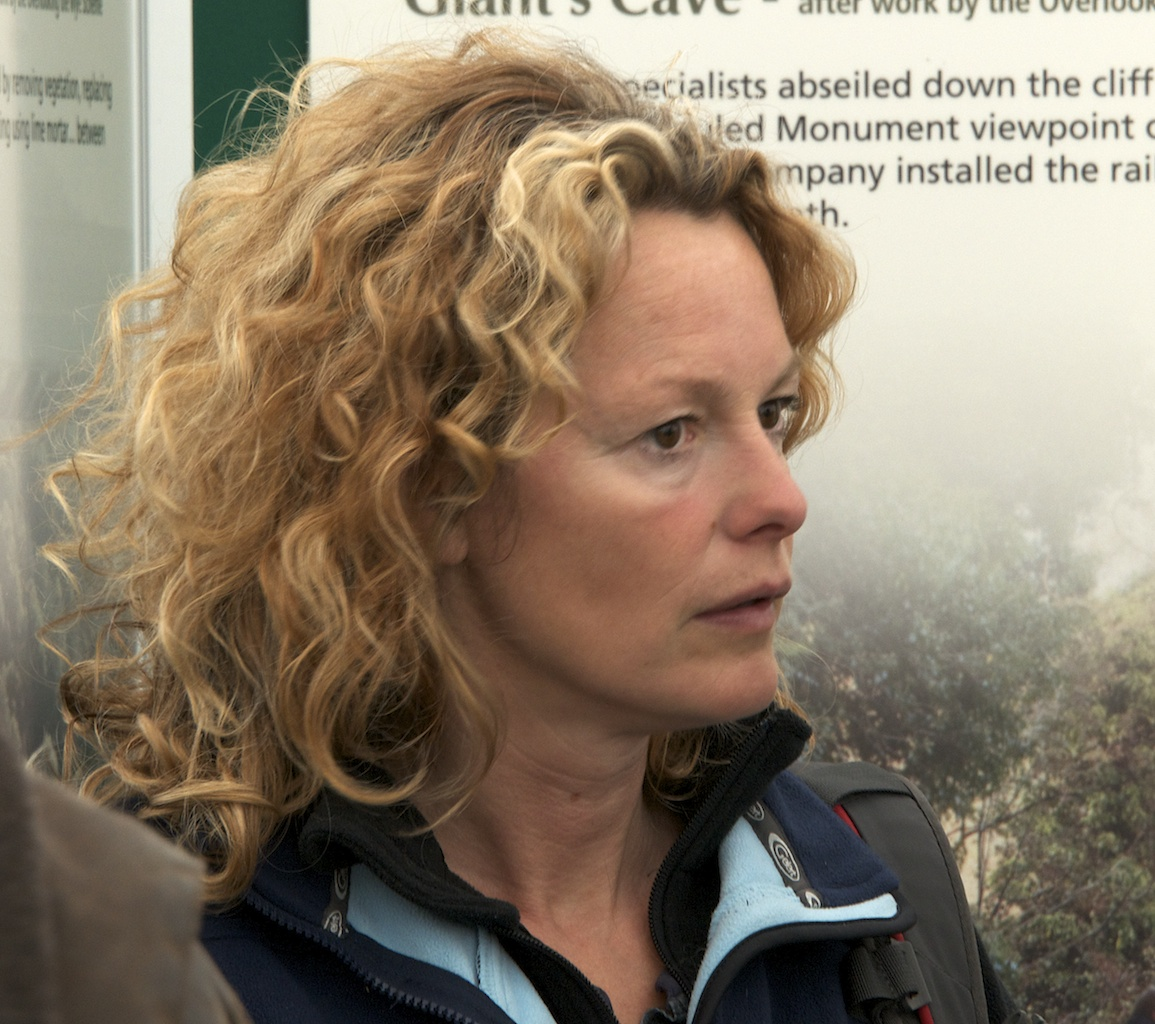
- Humble at the 2012 Monmouthshire Show
- Born: Katherine Mary Humble; 12 December 1968 (age 57); Wimbledon, London, England
- Occupation: Television presenter
- Spouse: Ludo Graham (m. 1992)
- Website: KateHumble.co.uk

Katherine Mary Humble (born 12 December 1968) is a British television presenter and narrator, mainly working for the BBC, specialising in wildlife and science programmes. Humble served as president of the Royal Society for the Protection of Birds from 2009 to 2013. She is an ambassador for the UK walking charity Living Streets.

== Early life and education ==
Born in Wimbledon, London, to IBM employee Nick Humble and Diana (née Carter), she is the granddaughter of Bill Humble, a notable pre-Second World War aviator. She is also the great-great-great granddaughter of Joseph Humble, colliery manager of Hartley Colliery at the time of the Hartley Colliery disaster. She has a brother. The family moved, when she was nine months old, to Bray in Berkshire, next door to a farm, and she was privately educated at the Abbey School in Reading. She later said of her schooling:

I was a very bad student. I had a fantastic Latin teacher which did mean I did Latin A-Level but other than that my school career wasn't something to be proud of.

After leaving school, she travelled through Africa from Cape Town to Cairo, doing various jobs including waitressing, driving safari trucks and working on a crocodile farm. She has returned to Africa many times since. In 1994, she travelled around Madagascar, the subject of her first article for The Daily Telegraph travel section. Since then she has written articles about diving and cycling in Cuba, Lake Nyos in Cameroon and hippopotamus conservation work in Ghana.

== Career ==
In 1990, Humble appeared for the first time as an actress in a TV production, Spymaker: The Secret Life of Ian Fleming, and was credited as "Lauren Heston … The redhead". She was the assistant to a casting director who was looking for an actress to play a brief nude scene, and she got the job herself.

Humble started her television career as a researcher, later transferring to presenting programmes such as Top Gear, Tomorrow's World and the 2001 series Holiday: You Call the Shots in which the team travelled the world doing whatever viewers recommended, using the then-novel media of text messaging and emailing the team as they travelled.

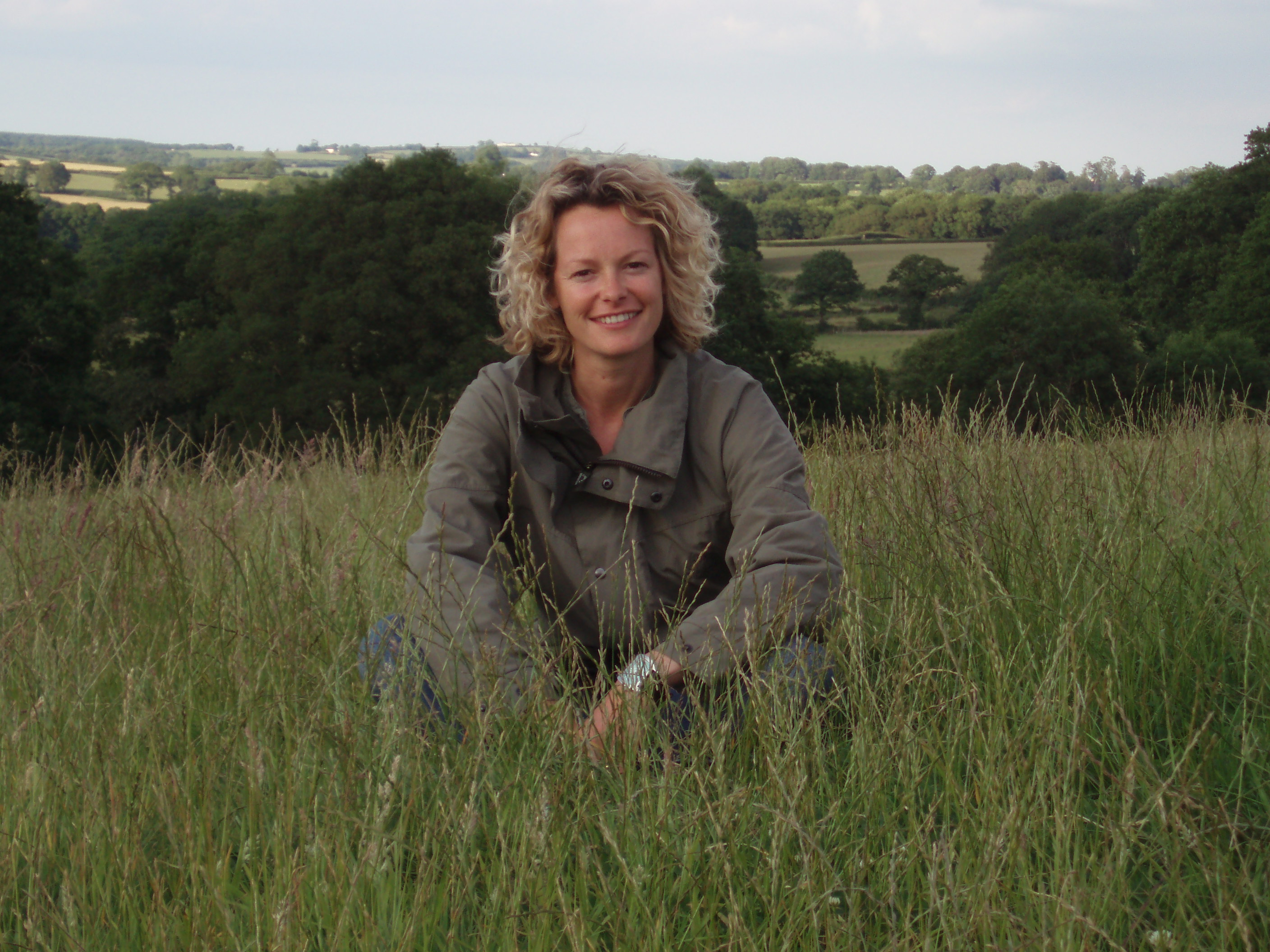
At Springwatch Farm in 2006

Humble has specialised in presenting wildlife programmes, including Animal Park, Springwatch and Autumnwatch with Bill Oddie, Simon King, Chris Packham and Martin Hughes-Games and, later, Wild in Africa and Seawatch.

From 2000 to 2005, she presented a BBC series called Rough Science, in which a number of scientists were set various challenges to be solved using basic tools and supplies.

Humble presented The Blue Planet Live! on the 2008 UK tour at Wembley Arena, St David's Hall in Cardiff and at Symphony Hall in Birmingham.

Her BBC television series The Hottest Place on Earth is a record of a month spent living with the Afar people in Ethiopia's hostile Danakil Depression.

She occasionally performs on the lecture circuit with a show based on her experiences with wildlife, titled Harassed by Hippos and Battered by Cod: A Humble Way to Make a Living.

In 2007, she founded the web site Stuff Your Rucksack that helps organisations around the world find the items they need by matching them with travellers.

On 16 February 2009, she made her first appearance in Countdown's Dictionary Corner. On 29 July 2009, she was the subject for the programme Who Do You Think You Are? where she discovered that she had family connections to the Hartley Colliery disaster. Her paternal grandfather Bill Humble was a test pilot who tested the Hawker Tempest and her maternal grandfather Stan Carter was an officer in the RAF and after being shot down was held as a prisoner of war in Stalag Luft III at the time of "The Great Escape".

In August 2009, Humble presented a series of programmes for the BBC in which she made a two thousand mile journey across the Middle East, following the ancient frankincense trade route of Arabia which first connected the Arab world with the West. The series culminated in her presenting frankincense, that she carried throughout the journey, for a Christmas service at the Church of the Nativity in Bethlehem. In October 2009, Humble was appointed president of the Royal Society for the Protection of Birds. In 2013, Humble was succeeded as President of the RSPB by Miranda Krestovnikoff.

In 2010, Humble described being on holiday in the north-eastern region of Afghanistan where there were no signs of conflict, but where the Wakhi people were expected to be hostile. Instead, Humble said they were "amongst the most astonishing, hospitable, warm, genuine people" she had ever met.

In February 2011, Humble presented a three-part series of programmes, The Spice Trail, on the trail of six of the world's most valuable spices, covering their history, trade, mythology and usage.

In March 2012, she co-presented with Helen Czerski a three-part BBC series, Orbit. In July, Humble co-presented Volcano Live with Iain Stewart.

In 2017, Humble presented the BBC Two documentary series Extreme Wives with Kate Humble. In the first episode, she visited the Kuria people in Kenya and explored issues of polygamy and female genital mutilation. In the second episode, she spoke to members of the Haredi orthodox Jewish community in Jerusalem. The third episode meets the matrilineal community of Shillong in the Indian state of Meghalaya. In 2018 she became president of the Wildfowl & Wetlands Trust.

Humble's book Thinking on My Feet: The small joy of putting one foot in front of another was shortlisted for the 2019 Wainwright Prize.

In 2020, alongside historian Dan Snow, Humble presented The Battle of Britain: 3 Days that Saved the Nation, a three-part programme commemorating the 80th anniversary of the Battle of Britain. The programme included Humble being flown in the backseat of a modified Spitfire: an experience she described as "kind of extraordinary and terrifying at the same time".

In November 2020, she was included in the BBC Radio 4 Woman's Hour Power List 2020.

== Personal life ==
Humble is married to the television producer Ludo Graham. Their families were friends, and they first met when she was aged 16 and he 23. They married in Newbury, Berkshire, in 1992, when she was 23. In 2007, they moved from Chiswick, West London, to the village of Trellech, in Monmouthshire, where they had wanted to live for "a very long time". Humble now owns her own farm after working on Lambing Live.

Humble reacted to public criticism on ITV's Lorraine about her lack of intent to have children, stating: "I don't want them, I've never wanted them".

Humble is a naturist who "likes to get closer to nature by being naked". About being naked, she said in 2014: "There's something joyous about it, and I urge everyone to try it".

Humble is an honorary graduate of The Open University. She is a beekeeper and a member of the British Beekeepers Association.

== Works ==
=== Television ===
- Holidays Out (1997)
- Holiday (1998–2000)
- The Essential Guide to Rocks (1998)
- Holiday: Fasten Your Seat Belt '98 (1998)
- Top Gear Waterworld (1998)
- Holiday Snaps (1999–2001)
- Webwise (1999)
- Top Gear (1999–2000)
- Holiday on a Shoestring (2000–2001)
- Esc@pe (2000)
- Chef SOS (2000)
- Countryfile (2000–2004)
- Animal Park (2000–2009, 2016—)
- Rough Science (2000–2005)
- Holiday: You Call The Shots (2001–2003)
- Ever Wondered: Colour – Blissfully Blue (2001)
- Ever Wondered: Extremes – Surviving Antarctica (2001)
- Rolf's Amazing World of Animals (2001)
- City Hospital (2001–2004)
- Tomorrow's World (2002)
- The Abyss: Live (2002–2003)
- Restoration (2003; series 1 final)
- The Murder Game (2003)
- Wild in Your Garden (2003)
- Test Your Pet (2004)
- Britain Goes Wild with Bill Oddie (2004)
- Amazon Abyss (2005)
- Animal Park – Wild in Africa (2005–2006)
- Springwatch (2005–2011)
- Best of Springwatch with Bill Oddie (2005)
- Autumnwatch (2006–2010)
- Seawatch (2006)
- The One Show (2006)
- Climate Change: Britain Under Threat (2007)
- Animal Park – Wild on the West Coast (2007)
- Pacific Abyss (2007)
- Ultimate Caving (2007)
- Britain's Lost World (2007)
- One Man and His Dog (2008)
- The Hottest Place on Earth (2008)
- Who Do You Think You Are? (29 July 2009)
- The Frankincense Trail (2009)
- Lambing Live (2010–2014)
- Birds Britannia (2010)
- The Spice Trail (2011)
- Orbit: Earth's Extraordinary Journey (2012)
- Winterwatch (2012)
- Volcano Live (2012)
- Airport Live (2013)
- Wild Shepherdess with Kate Humble (2013)
- The Secret Life of the Sun (2013)
- Kew On A Plate (2014)
- Kate Humble: Into the Volcano (2015)
- Wild Things (2015)
- Building Cars Live (2015)
- Let's Play Darts (2016)
- Chinese New Year: The Biggest Celebration on Earth (2016)
- Curious Creatures (2017)
- Extreme Wives with Kate Humble (2017)
- Back to the Land with Kate Humble (2017)
- Kate Humble: Off the Beaten Track (2018)
- Curious Creatures (2018)
- A Country Life for Half the Price with Kate Humble (2020)
- Escape To The Farm (2020–)
- Kate Humble's Coastal Britain (2021)
- Kate Humble: Good Life, Green Life (2021)
- Warship: Life in the Royal Navy (2026)

=== Books ===
- Watching Waterbirds with Kate Humble and Martin McGill: 100 birds ... in just one day!. with Martin McGill. 2011.
- Humble by Nature. 2013.
- Friend for Life: The Extraordinary Partnership Between Humans and Dogs. 2016.
- Thinking on My Feet: The small joy of putting one foot in front of another. Aster. 2018. ISBN 978-1912023646.
- Home Cooked. Gaia. 2022. ISBN 978-1856754620.
