= Lambing Live =

British television series (2010–2014)

- Created by: BBC
- Presented by: Kate Humble; Adam Henson
- No. of series: 3

Production
- Executive producer: Sarah Gibbs
- Camera setup: Multi-camera setup
- Running time: 60 minutes

Original release
- Network: BBC Two
- Release: 7 March 2010 – 28 March 2014

Lambing Live is a farming programme which was broadcast live on BBC Two in five parts, beginning on Sunday 7 March 2010. Presented by Kate Humble and Adam Henson, the show was mainly filmed live on the Beavan family farm, near Abergavenny in Monmouthshire and followed a week in the life of the farm, concentrating on the births of the new lambs. Filmed inserts showed the lead-up to the lambing season, including the purchase of two new stud sheep (tups). The show was produced in a style similar to Springwatch.

The second series following a farming family from Cumbria began on 4 April 2011, again presented by Kate Humble. A third series began airing from 24 March 2014. This series concentrates on the Dykes family who have been farming close to the Pentland Hills since the 1950s. They breed primarily sheep but also some cattle.
