= Men of Rock =

- Genre: Nature documentary
- Directed by: Matt Barrett, Andrew Thompson, Jeremy Turner and Nigel Walk
- Presented by: Iain Stewart
- Country of origin: United Kingdom
- Original language: English
- No. of seasons: 1
- No. of episodes: 3

Production
- Running time: 59 minutes
- Production company: BBC Scotland

Original release
- Network: BBC Two Scotland
- Release: 30 November – 14 December 2010

Men of Rock is a 2010 TV series produced by the BBC about pioneering geologists working in Scotland. It is presented by Professor Iain Stewart.

== Episodes ==
Deep Time 1/3 The story of James Hutton, the founding father of geology.

Moving Mountains 2/3 An examination of how geologist Edward Bailey discovered Scotland once had super volcanoes.

The Big Freeze 3/3 The story of Louis Agassiz, who first proposed that the earth had experienced an ice age.
