= The Tube (2012 TV series) =

2012 BBC documentary television series

- Created by: Rowan Deacon
- Narrated by: Julian Barratt
- Country of origin: United Kingdom
- Original language: English
- No. of series: 1
- No. of episodes: 6

Production
- Running time: 60 minutes
- Production company: Blast! Films

Original release
- Network: BBC Two
- Release: 20 February – 26 March 2012

The Tube is a 2012 documentary television series produced by Blast! Films for the BBC. It follows the staff and passengers of the London Underground as it undergoes the biggest upgrade in its history. It premiered on BBC Two on 20 February 2012 for a six-week run. According to Blast! Films's Twitter, there were no plans for a second series; however, the company produced an identically-themed series (entitled The Tube: Going Underground) for Channel 5 in 2016.

== Episodes ==
| No. | Title | Original release date | UK viewers (millions) |
|---|---|---|---|
| 1 | "Weekend" | 20 February 2012 | 2.061 |
Episode 1 (Weekend) highlights the difficulties of undertaking major renewal of the tracks without disrupting the weekday service, the engineer works at Harrow-on-the-Hill station which results in no Metropolitan Line nor National Rail services at the station until the completion of the engineer works, and the handling of an incident at Leicester Square Station where a woman was pushed onto the electrified tracks at Platform 4, resulting in huge crowds, an arrest (although the suspect was later released without charge) and Northern Line services from North and Southbound trains having to pass without stopping until the closing of the station when the Northern Line was suspended at Leicester Square.
| 2 | "Revenue" | 27 February 2012 | 2.188 |
Episode 2 (Revenue) looks at the work of ticket inspectors and others working to track down the estimated 60,000 people who use the system each day without paying for a ticket, which costs the Underground some £20 million in lost revenue each year. The episode also includes two ladies who are the ticket inspectors for the Northern Line, and two men keeping a lookout for any Oyster card system problems on the Hammersmith and City Line at Latimer Road. The Metropolitan Line makes a change as the A Stock train is replaced with a brand new S Stock Train and both lines, as well as the Circle Line, are suspended from Liverpool Street when a track failure occurs at Farringdon.
| 3 | "Emergency Response" | 5 March 2012 | 2.030 |
Episode 3 (Emergency Response) looks at the trauma caused to drivers when passengers fall or jump in front of a train. It also looks at the work of the emergency response unit at Bank and Euston Stations where, in both cases, the passengers were fatally injured, and the types of incident that the unit has to deal with. It also shows the stresses put on the system by the Notting Hill Carnival, as well as some plans for the crowds at both Notting Hill Gate and Westbourne Park stations where 42 arrests have been made without any serious incidents.
| 4 | "Upgrading the Tube" | 12 March 2012 | 2.237 |
Episode 4 (Upgrading the Tube) looks at reliability issues following the introduction of new trains on the Victoria line and the knock-on effects caused by the failure of a newly installed signal. It also shows the work of a station supervisor at Tottenham Court Road as he tries to ensure that customers are kept moving during an upgrade to the station which will increase its size by a factor of six, resulting in the Northern Line having to pass TCR without stopping for 7 months until the upgrade is complete.
| 5 | "Rush Hour" | 19 March 2012 | 2.173 |
Episode 5 (Rush Hour) covers Bank station, where five passengers suffered from fainting or injury during a single rush hour shift, and problems on the Jubilee line when a failure of the power supply almost disrupted the evening peak services. It also shows the use of a hawk called Toyah to clear train sheds of pigeons.
| 6 | "Overnight" | 26 March 2012 | 2.249 |
Episode 6 (Overnight), the final episode, which aired on 26 March 2012, featured the work of cleaners, who work during the four-hour period each night when the power is switched of, to clean the stations and remove lint and fibres from the tracks to reduce the risk of fire. Other stories included the work of a pest controller at Hounslow Central, and a visit to the disused Down Street by a member of the emergency response team.

== Reception ==
Grace Dent of The Guardian called it "fantastic three-part (sic) exploration of London Underground, which offered many remarkable moments". She felt that the way in which the programme was billed made it look less interesting than it turned out to be. She was appalled at the behaviour shown by some of the customers portrayed in the episodes, and impressed by the way that staff were shown dealing with such abuse. Christopher Hooton came to a similar conclusion, when he wrote in the Metro: "Surprisingly then, The Tube was actually a pretty entertaining and enlightening hour."

== DVD ==
The series was released as The Underground by Delta Home Entertainment on 24 August 2014.

== See also ==
- The Railway: Keeping Britain On Track
- The Route Masters: Running London's Roads
