= Volcano Live =

Television series

- Genre: Natural history
- Presented by: Kate Humble; Iain Stewart
- Starring: Ed Byrne
- Theme music composer: Carl Harms
- Country of origin: United Kingdom
- Original language: English
- No. of series: 1
- No. of episodes: 4

Production
- Executive producer: Lisa Ausden
- Producer: Alan Holland
- Production location: Hawaii
- Running time: 60 minutes
- Production company: BBC

Original release
- Network: BBC Two, BBC HD
- Release: 9 July – 12 July 2012

Volcano Live is a live television programme broadcast on BBC Two from 9 July 2012. The show was commissioned following the success of other "live" programmes such as Stargazing Live. Volcano Live was presented over four nights by Kate Humble and Iain Stewart from the Kīlauea volcano on Hawaii's Big Island. Comedian Ed Byrne presented segments, which attempted to discover the principles behind volcanic phenomena. Volcano Live also featured pre-recorded reports and interviews in addition to the real-time broadcast. Webcams showed volcanic activity from around the world and online features included a geothermal map of current volcanic events.

== Overview ==
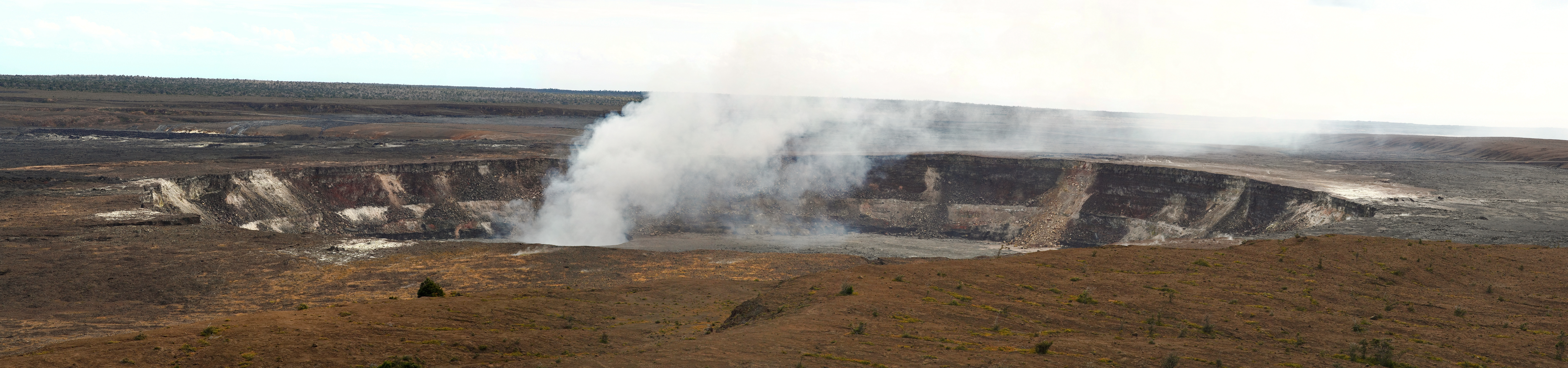
Volcano Live was broadcast from Halemaʻumaʻu within the summit caldera of Kīlauea.

Volcano Live was commissioned following the success of Stargazing Live and Lambing Live. The controller of BBC Two, Janice Hadlow, stated "Volcano Live will offer BBC Two viewers a rare opportunity to join world-class experts at the forefront of cutting-edge volcanology research. Broadcasting live from the edge of one of the world's most active volcanoes over four days will offer a completely new and unique way of experiencing this powerful and unpredictable natural phenomenon."

Kate Humble and Professor Iain Stewart were chosen to present the live show. Stewart had not done live television before, while Humble had previously presented many shows, including Springwatch. Stewart has been studying volcanoes for twenty years and his journey to the Bay of Naples in Italy to explain about devastating eruptions was shown in the third episode. Humble traveled to Iceland a few months before the show was broadcast to get a closer look at Eyjafjallajökull and to learn about the people who study and live near to other volcanoes. A writer for the BBC's Media Centre said "As Kate embarks on a journey of discovery, geologist Iain provides context and insight and together they guide viewers through the science of volcanology." Comedian Ed Byrne presented segments on experimental volcanology and the principles behind volcanic phenomena in the University of Bristol research laboratories.

The show was broadcast live from the active Kīlauea volcano on Hawaii over four days starting from 9 July. The Media Centre writer added that Volcano Live would allow viewers to connect with the active terrain that impacts the land and lives around it. The Hawaiʻi Volcanoes National Park and scientists of the Hawaiian Volcano Observatory hosted the production. Pre-recorded footage featuring interviews with experts, expeditions of volcanologists and demonstrations was added into the real-time broadcast. Humble and Stewart operated out of a specialised motor home and used Kīlauea to help explain the science of volcanoes. Online features included a "geothermal map" of current worldwide volcanic events.

== Episodes ==
| No. | Title | Directed by | Original release date | UK viewers (millions) |
|---|---|---|---|---|
| 1 | "An Introduction to our Active World" | Stephen Neal | 9 July 2012 | 2.49 |
Kate Humble and Iain Stewart broadcast live from the edge of Kīlauea's summit crater on Hawaii. Kate travels to Iceland to visit the Eyjafjallajökull volcano, which disrupted air travel throughout Europe in 2010. Ed Byrne goes to the University of Bristol to learn the different ways in which volcanoes erupt and Geologist Lorraine Field's footage of a lava lake from the Democratic Republic of the Congo is shown.
| 2 | "Life and Death" | Stephen Neal | 10 July 2012 | 2.24 |
Kate Humble and Iain Stewart broadcast from the site of the 1969 Mauna Ulu eruption. Kate travels to the Icelandic island of Heimaey to learns about the fishermen who took on a volcano. Ed Byrne learns about lava flows, lava bombs and pyroclastic flows, while volcanologist Hugh Tuffen present his video diary of an expedition to Puyehue.
| 3 | "Volcanoes, Earthquakes and Tsunamis" | Stephen Neal | 11 July 2012 | 2.04 |
Kate Humble and Iain Stewart broadcast from Kalapana, a town destroyed by lava flows. They learn about the connections between volcanoes, earthquakes and tsunamis, while Ed discovers how they are created. Iain visits the Bay of Naples to explain the causes of devastating volcanic eruptions and Kate descends into the mouth of a dormant Icelandic volcano.
| 4 | "The Future" | Stephen Neal | 12 July 2012 | 2.00 |
Kate Humble and Iain Stewart return to Kīlauea's summit crater to broadcast the final episode. They discover the future of volcanic forecasting and Iain travels to Pompeii to see the effects of Mount Vesuvius on the town. Ed Byrne tries his hand at creating a supervolcanic eruption, while Kate visits the Katla volcano in Iceland.

== Reception ==
=== Ratings ===
The first episode opened with 2.49 million viewers and had an audience share of 10.8% according to overnight data. The second episode posted a small decrease, pulling in 2.24 million viewers and an audience share of 10.2%. 167,000 people watched the episode on the BBC HD channel, attaining a 0.76% share. Episode three gained 2.04 million viewers and a 10% share.

=== Critical response ===
Ahead of the first episode airing, John Robinson from The Guardian stated "It's interesting, then, that the BBC's next live nature step should be this: wherein Kate Humble and geologist Iain Stewart attempt to sex-up vulcanology at Kilauea, Hawaii. Undoubtedly a professional job will be done, but at the ideas stage this sounds more whimper than bang." The Metro's Larushka Ivan-Zadeh and Sharon Lougher wrote "Stargazing Live, Planet Earth Live, Springwatch Live: carry on at this rate and we'll have Allotment Live, Out The Back by the Bins Live… but before then, it's a chance for a volcano to have its turn in the spotlight. That volcano is Hawaii's Kilauea, the world's most active. Kate Humble and Prof Iain Stewart are the pair risking the red-hot lava as they broadcast from the edge of the crater, while comedian Ed Byrne randomly pops up to explain more about the science. Hey, if anyone can make molten rocks fun, he can."

Writing for the Radio Times Paul Jones commented Humble was "just the job" for a show like Volcano Live, while Stewart "had Professor Brian Cox's knack of making rocks seem exciting, as well as his habit of using everyday items as props". Jones added that the only problem he had with the programme was that the molten lava rolling down the hill "exposing that cinder toffee interior", made him wonder what was for dessert. A reporter for the Shropshire Star gave the show a negative review, saying "as we sat back and anticipated the biggest and best pyrotechnic displays that nature has to offer, we were instead given a comedian armed with Mentos and diet Coke trying to figure out the difference between spurting and seepage." The reporter added "credit must be given to both presenters who worked tirelessly to inject a bit of life into the show. But unless Humble and Stewart had been propelled into the stratosphere atop a lava fountain, then there was nothing unique about this live experience that I hadn't seen before on a GCSE geography programme."
