= Iain Stewart (geologist) =

Scottish geologist and professor

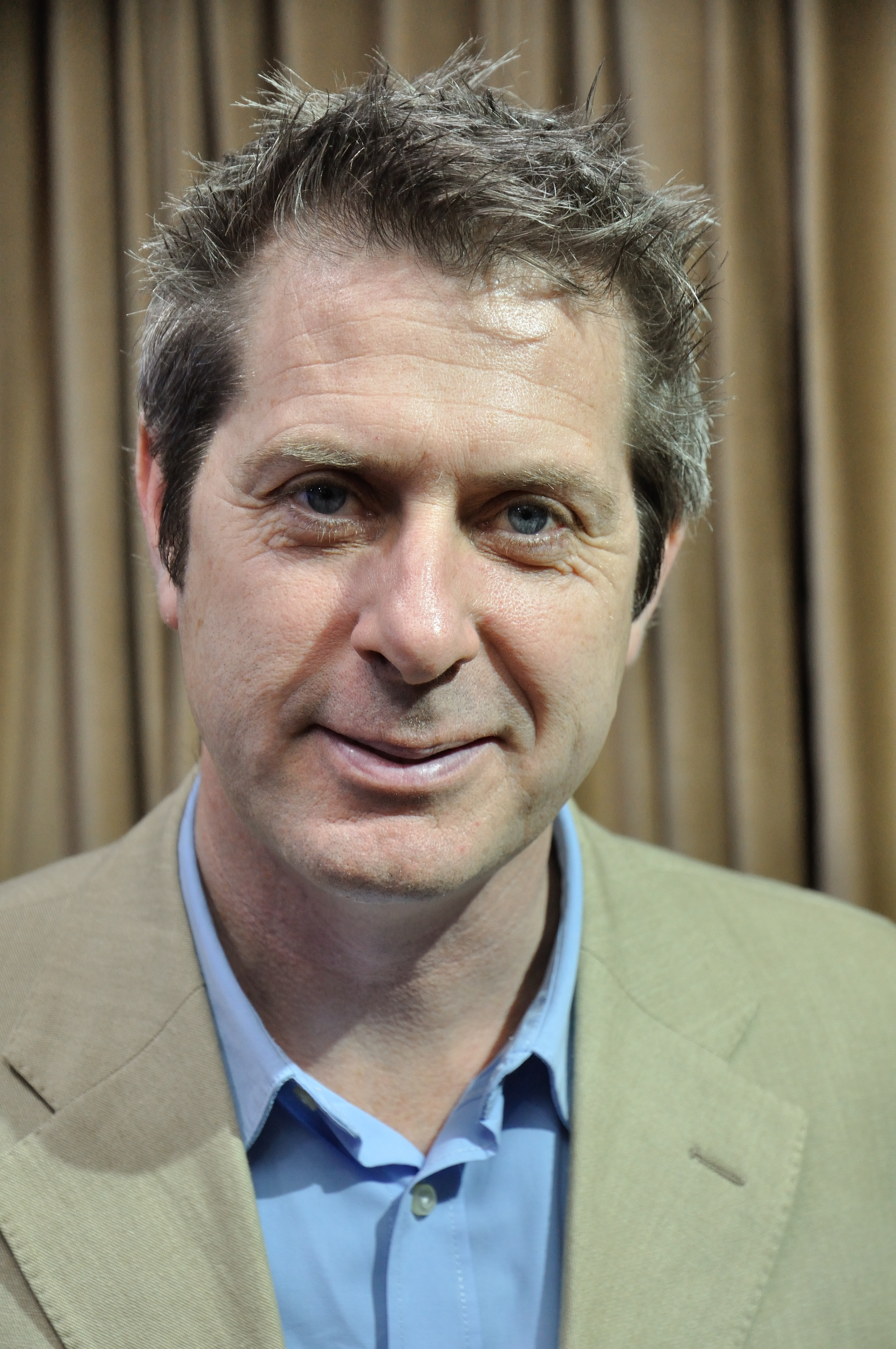
- Born: 1964 (age 61–62); East Kilbride, South Lanarkshire, Scotland
- Citizenship: United Kingdom
- Education: University of Strathclyde, Bristol University
- Known for: Earth: The Power of the Planet; Rise of the Continents; Journeys From the Centre of the Earth; Rough Science; How Earth Made Us; BBC Horizon
- Scientific career
- Fields: Geology
- Workplaces: University of Plymouth, West London Institute of Higher Education, Brunel University
- Thesis: The evolution of neotectonic normal fault scarps in the Aegean Region (1990)
- Doctoral advisor: Paul Hancock; John Thornes
- Website: www.plymouth.ac.uk/staff/istewart twitter.com/Profiainstewart

Iain Simpson Stewart MBE FGS FRSE (born 1964) is a Scottish geologist who is currently Jordan-UK El Hassan bin Talal Research Chair in Sustainability at the Royal Scientific Society in Jordan. He is a UNESCO Chair in Geoscience and Society and formerly a member of the Scientific Board of UNESCO's International Geoscience Programme. Described as geology's "rock star", Stewart is best known to the public as the presenter of a number of science programmes for the BBC, notably the BAFTA nominated Earth: The Power of the Planet (2007).

He is a Fellow of the Geological Society of London, the Royal Society of Edinburgh, and President of the Royal Scottish Geographical Society. Until 2021 he was director of the Sustainable Earth Institute at University of Plymouth and remains a professor of geoscience communication there, in addition to his role as co-director of the Centre for Climate Change and Sustainability at Ashoka University.

== Early life and education ==
Stewart was born in 1964 in East Kilbride, in Lanarkshire, to Sheena and Jack. He has two younger brothers, Graeme and Frazer. He attended Mount Cameron Primary and then Claremont High School from 1976 to 1982. In an interview with the Glasgow Herald, Stewart revealed that he initially struggled with geology: "I was a middling student, never really at the top of the class, nor at the bottom. Which I think is good, in a way. When you're out there at the top, it can be quite isolating."

Stewart was a child actor and holder of an Equity card. His first appearance on television came in 1978, in a BBC Scotland adaptation of John Buchan's 1922 novel Huntingtower. Amongst his contemporaries at the East Kilbride Rep Theatre was the actor John Hannah. Leaving acting behind, he studied geography and geology at Strathclyde University, graduating in 1986 with a first class honours Bachelor of Science degree. He obtained his doctorate, entitled "The evolution of neotectonic normal fault scarps in the Aegean Region" in 1990 at the University of Bristol on research into earthquakes in Greece and Turkey. In 1990 he began teaching geology at the West London Institute of Higher Education (WLIHE) in Osterley (occupying the Warden's flat with his wife for several years), and from 1995 at Brunel University due to its merger with WLIHE. After 12 years in London he moved back to Scotland to develop a new career as a science broadcaster. Nostalgic for Brunel, he said "And invariably, you move on to places that for all their benefits, seem surprisingly narrow, and more fallow, in comparison. In short, it was a remarkable place to be". He moved to the University of Plymouth in 2004, later becoming Professor of Geoscience Communication, a position he believed to be unique in the world. He left to become Jordan-UK El Hassan bin Talal Research Chair in Sustainability in 2021 on a four year secondment to the Royal Scientific Society, based in Amman.

== Broadcasting ==
Stewart returned to television as an expert academic for Helike – The Real Atlantis, a 2002 BBC Horizon film about the destruction of the Greek city of Helike by earthquake and tsunami in 373 BCE, newly rediscovered in 2001. This, he says, "gave me a hunger to get more geology on telly." He featured in another Horizon film, on earthquakes, in April 2003, before appearing as a team member in the fourth series of Rough Science (shown January/February 2004), a series where a group of scientists is challenged to solve tasks using only the resources of the local surroundings and a small set of supplies. From there, built up a 15 year partnership with BBC Science presenting and hosting major Earth science documentaries and radio programmes until 2015, when Planet Oil aired on the BBC.

== Research ==
His main research interests are in the broad area of Earth hazards and natural disasters, particularly in terms of identifying past major earthquakes, tsunamis and volcanic eruptions in the Mediterranean region. Stewart also specialises in geology's effect on culture and religion throughout the history of the world. He appears in other roles, including as a scientific commentator.

He also worked on a project called Eden in 2011, where scientists wanted to recreate a project called The Bell Jar. If you put a mouse in the jar, it would die quickly, but if you put a mouse in the jar with a plant, it would live longer. In project Eden, Stewart was a mouse, and the bell jar was a box (8x2x2 meters) with plants such as banana trees. When he went in, they lowered the oxygen levels from 20% to 12%. The question was, could the plant produce enough to compensate for the lack of oxygen. The result was that they can do it. It means that the need for plants for living is high.

Stewart was appointed Member of the Order of the British Empire (MBE) in the 2013 Birthday Honours for services to geology and science communication.

== Other activities ==
He is a patron of the English Riviera Geopark, a member of the Scientific Board of UNESCO's International Geological Programme and chair of its 'Hazards' theme, a vice-president of The Geographical Association and its primary Geography 'Champion', a member of the Steering Committee of the IUGS-Commission on Geoscience for Environmental Management Working Group on 'Communicating Environmental Geoscience', a member of the UK National Coordinating Centre for Public Engagement's Academic Action Research group, and a member of The Geological Society of London's external relations committee. He is a member of the board of directors at the Centre for Research into Earth Energy Systems, University of Durham.

== Honours and awards ==
Honorary Degrees

- 2021 Doctor of Science (D.Sc) - Ghent University
- 2014 Doctor of Science (D.Sc) - University of Glasgow
- 2013 Doctor of Science (D.Sc) - Kingston University

Awards

- 2018 UNESCO Chair in Geoscience and Society
- 2018 Geological Society of America, President’s Medal
- 2017 American Geosciences Institute, ‘Public Understanding of Geosciences’ award
- 2017 Geological Society of America, International Distinguished Lecturer
- 2016 European Federation of Geologists ‘Medal of Merit’
- 2015 Royal Society of Edinburgh Senior Public Engagement Award
- 2014 American Association of Petroleum Geologists ‘Geoscientists in the Media’ award
- 2014 ‘Scientia Medal’, University of New South Wales
- 2013 Member of the Order of the British Empire (MBE) in the 2013 Birthday Honours for services to geology and science communication.
- 2013 American Geophysical Union(AGU) Atheston Spilhaus award
- 2011 Edinburgh Geological Society – Honorary Fellow
- 2011 Geologists' Association - Honorary Life Membership
- 2010 The Geological Society of London– Honorary Fellow
- 2010 Royal Geographical Society ‘Ness Medal’ Royal Geographical Society for "popularising geography and earth sciences."
- 2009 Geologists' Association - ‘Beverley Halstead Medal’

== Work ==
=== Selected broadcasts ===
- Journeys from the Centre of the Earth (2004), six one-hour films charting how geology has shaped the history of the Mediterranean, shown in the United States on Discovery's Science Channel as Hot Rocks: Geology of Civilization. The series won the prestigious "Best Earth Science programme" award at the 2005 Jackson Hole Film Festival.
- Journeys into the Ring of Fire (2006); four one-hour films showing how rocks shaped the history and culture in Japan, Peru, Indonesia and California.
- Earth: The Power of the Planet (2007), US title: Earth: The Biography, five one hour films (Volcano, Oceans, Atmosphere, Ice, Rare Earth) about the forces that have shaped the planet and made it what it is. Cerapachys iainstewarti, a species of Madagascar ant discovered during the filming of this series, was named after Stewart.
- Ten Things You Didn't Know About... Volcanoes (2006), Tsunamis, Earthquakes, Avalanches, (2008).
- The Climate Wars (2008), three one-hour films tracing the history of the science and politics of global warming.
- Hot Planet (2009), with Kathy Sykes, examined global warming ahead of the 2009 United Nations Climate Change Conference in Copenhagen.
- How Earth Made Us (2010), ASIN: B002SZQCA2 (Blu-ray), US title: How the Earth Changed History, ASIN: B003DC8824, five one-hour films on how geology, geography and climate have influenced mankind.
- Walking Through Landscapes, (2010) Radio show, BBC Radio Scotland.
- Making Scotland's Landscape, (2010) BBC television.
- Men Of Rock (2011) about scientists working in Scotland who pioneered geological study and understanding. BBC
- How to Grow a Planet (2012)
- Volcano Live (2012)
- Rise of the Continents 4 part series (2013) BBC TV
- Fracking: The New Energy Rush (2013) Horizon, BBC TV
- Swallowed by a Sinkhole (2014) Horizon, investigates why the geology of Florida makes it the sinkhole capital of the world, BBC TV
- Planet Oil (2015) BBC
- James Clerk Maxwell: The Man Who Made the Modern World The story behind the Scottish physicist who was Einstein's hero. (2015) BBC
- Scotland's First Oil Rush (2016) TVI Vision for BBC; the story of the Scottish shale oil industry Scotland: First Oil Rush

=== Major publications ===
- Sintubin, M., Stewart, I.S., Niemi, T. Altunel, E. (eds.) 2010. Ancient earthquakes. Geological Society of America Special Paper 471, 280p.
- Pascal, C, Vermeersen, B., Stewart, I.S. (eds.) 2009. Neotectonics, seismicity and stress in glaciated regions Thematic issue of the Journal of the Geological Society. London.
- Stewart, I.S. and J. Lynch. 2008. Earth: the biography. Washington DC: National Geographic. ISBN 1-4262-0236-9.
- Stewart, I.S. 2005. Journeys from the centre of the Earth: how geology shaped civilisation. London: Century/Random House. ISBN 1-84413-813-5
- Morner, N.A., Stewart, I.S., Trifonov, V.G., Caputo, R., Nikonov, A.A., Kozhurin, A.I.,& Kopp, M.L. (Eds.) 2004. Active Faults in the Eastern Hemisphere. Tectonophysics Special Issue volume 380, nos. 3–4.
- Dunne, W., Stewart, I.S. & Turner, J.P. (Eds.) 2001. Brittle Microtectonics, Neotectonics and Archaeoseismicity. Journal of Structural Geology, special issue, vol. 13, No.2/3, 500pp.
- Stewart, I.S., Sauber, J. & Rose, J. (Eds.) 2000. Ice Sheets, Crustal Deformation and Seismicity. Journal of Quaternary Science special issue, vol. 14/15.
- McGuire, W.J., Griffiths, D., Hancock, P.L. & Stewart, I.S. (Eds.) 2000. The Archaeology of Geological Catastrophes. Geological Society of London. Special Publication, 171, 413p. ISBN 978-1-86239-062-1
- Stewart, I.S. and C. Vita-Finzi (eds.). 1999. Coastal Tectonics. Geological Society of London. Special Publication ISBN 1-86239-024-X
- Stewart, Iain (22 March 2018). Plate Tectonics. illus. Ruth Palmer. London: Ladybird Books. ISBN 978-0-7181-8718-7.
- Stewart, I., Hurth, V. & Sterling, S. (Eds) 2022. Re-purposing Universities for Sustainable Human Progress. Frontiers in Sustainability,
