= The Railway: Keeping Britain On Track =

- Genre: Documentary
- Directed by: Jo Hughes
- Narrated by: Kevin Whately
- Composer: Andy Cowton
- Country of origin: United Kingdom
- Original language: English
- No. of series: 1
- No. of episodes: 6

Production
- Executive producer: Liesel Evans
- Producer: Jo Hughes
- Production location: United Kingdom
- Editor: John Mister
- Camera setup: Single-camera
- Running time: 6 x 59 minutes
- Production company: Century Films

Original release
- Network: BBC Two
- Release: 12 February – 19 March 2013

The Railway: Keeping Britain On Track is a British television documentary broadcast on BBC Two and narrated by Kevin Whately. It is about passenger railway operations in Britain.

The series, produced by Century Films, comprises six episodes and was first broadcast on 12 February 2013.

== Episodes ==
No.	Title	Directed by	Original release date
1	"King's Cross"	Laura Fairrie	12 February 2013
Set at London King's Cross railway station, featuring East Coast and First Capital Connect staff and the 2012 refurbishment of the station.
2	"Summer Madness"	Jo Hughes	19 February 2013
Set at Leeds railway station and the Huddersfield Line
3	"Standing Room Only"	Rob McCabe	26 February 2013
Set on the First Great Western network including Reading, London Paddington and Twyford stations.
4	"West Coast Mainline"	Rob McCabe	5 March 2013
Set along the route linking London to Manchester and Glasgow.
5	"Railway On My Doorstep"	Rob McCabe	12 March 2013
Set on the Merseyrail network in Liverpool, the Valley Lines network in South Wales, and in Steventon, Oxfordshire.
6	"North of the Border"	Rob McCabe	19 March 2013
Set in Scotland at Edinburgh Waverley, Glasgow Central, Craigentinny depot and elsewhere.
