= Michaela Strachan =

English television presenter and naturalist (born 1966)

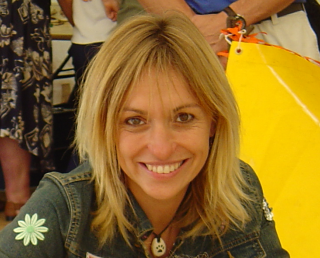
- Strachan in 2004
- Born: Michaela Evelyn Ann Strachan; 7 April 1966 (age 60); Ewell, Surrey, England
- Education: Claremont Fan Court School; Arts Educational Schools, London
- Occupations: Television presenter; singer
- Years active: 1985–present
- Spouse: Duncan Chard (m. 1996; div. 2001)
- Partner: Nick Chevallier (2003–present)
- Children: 1
- Website: michaelastrachan.co.uk

Michaela Evelyn Ann Strachan (/strækən/, born 7 April 1966) is an English television presenter and singer. After beginning her career in theatre, she presented the children's television shows Wide Awake Club (1986–1989) and Wacaday (1987–1989). She subsequently co-presented The Hitman and Her (1988–1992) and embarked on a brief music career under the stage name Michaela, releasing two singles, "H.A.P.P.Y. Radio" (1989) and "Take Good Care of My Heart" (1990), which reached number 62 and 66 in the UK singles chart, respectively.

Strachan has since become known for her work as a wildlife presenter. After fronting The Really Wild Show (1993–2006), she went on to become a regular reporter on BBC's Countryfile (1999–2009), during which time she emigrated to South Africa. Since 2011, Strachan has been a regular presenter on BBC's Springwatch and its seasonal adaptations. In 2025, she was a runner-up on the seventeenth series of Dancing on Ice.

== Early life ==
Michaela Evelyn Ann Strachan was born on 7 April 1966 in Ewell, Surrey. She grew up in Hinchley Wood and attended Chadsworth Stage School, then Claremont Fan Court School, both in Esher. During her teenage years, she suffered from anorexia. Prior to her television career, she briefly held jobs as an Avon lady and as a kissogram.

== Career ==
=== Children's television and music career ===
Strachan studied at ArtsEd in London, and, after leaving in 1985, appeared in the musical Seven Brides for Seven Brothers at the Grand Theatre, Blackpool. She subsequently went on to appear in further theatre roles and embarked on a career in children's television. Strachan was a regular presenter on Saturday-morning television shows in the 1980s, in such programmes as Good Morning Britain, Wide Awake Club, Wacaday and WAC '90 with Timmy Mallett.

In 1988, she hosted Boogie Box on music channel Music Box. From 1988 to 1992, Strachan starred as "Her" in the nightclub-set music show The Hitman and Her alongside Pete Waterman. Strachan had a brief music career under the name Michaela and released two UK singles: a cover of Edwin Starr's "H.A.P.P.Y. Radio" (UK No. 62, 1989) and "Take Good Care of My Heart" (UK No. 66, 1990).

=== Wildlife presenting and other projects ===
In 1993, Strachan joined The Really Wild Show, a wildlife programme for children on BBC1, which she went on to present for the next 13 years. In 1999, she became a regular reporter for BBC One's Countryfile and remained so until the programme underwent a primetime Sunday evening revamp in April 2009. Her move to South Africa prevented her from committing fully to the new show. While filming an item for Countryfile in 2002, Strachan entered the World Gurning competition at Egremont Crab Fair. To her surprise, she won the Ladies' World Gurning Crown.

Strachan co-presented two series of Orangutan Diary with Steve Leonard for BBC One. These series followed the daily routines at a reserve for orphaned orangutans in Borneo and the work of Lone Drøscher Nielsen and her team in rescuing and rehabilitating the orangutans. They were broadcast in 2006 and 2008. She told The Independent that her greatest inspiration is Nielsen who "works under very difficult conditions and shows an all-consuming dedication to these animals".

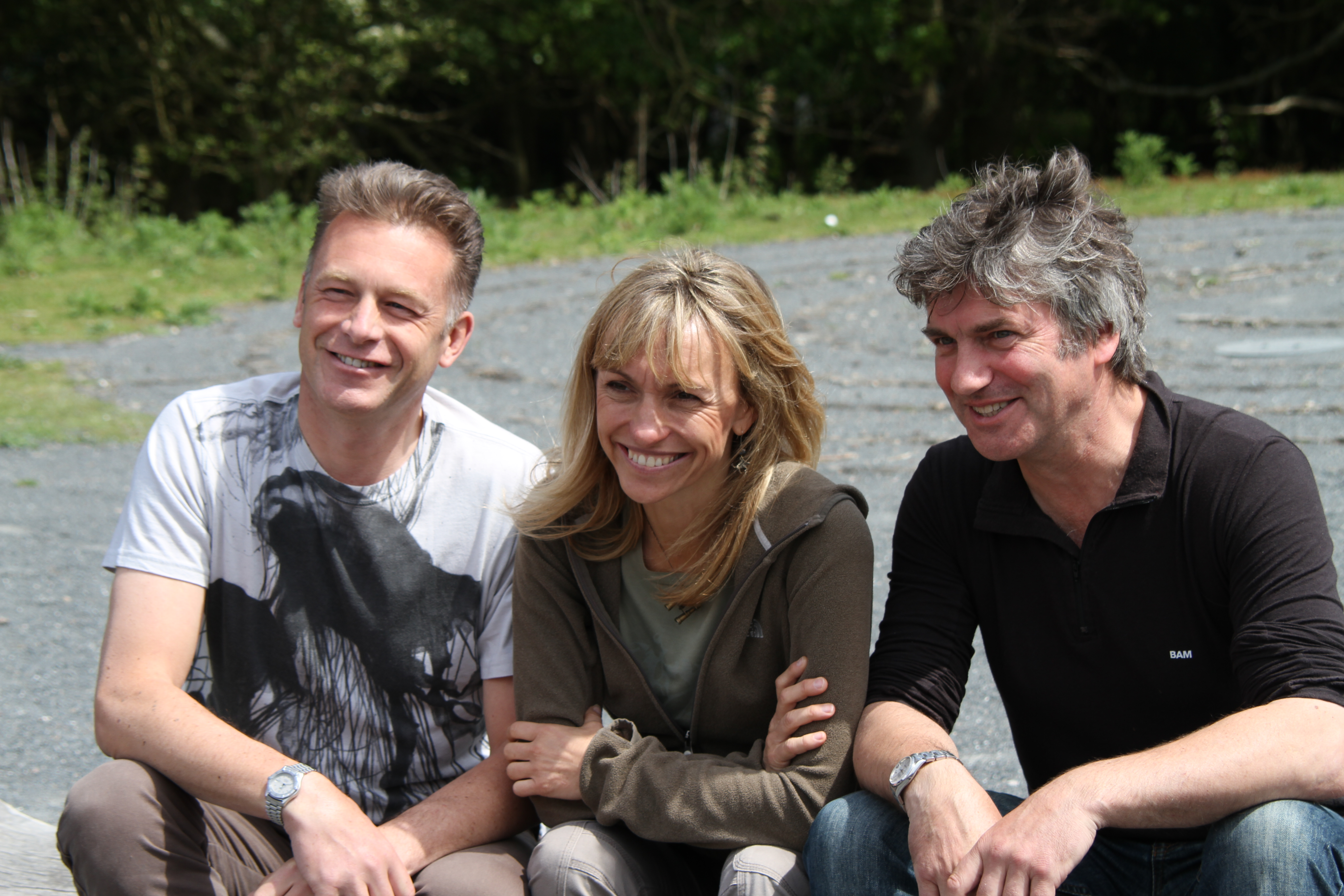
The Springwatch presenters, Chris Packham (left), Michaela Strachan (centre) and Martin Hughes-Games (right), at the 2014 Springwatch media launch, RSPB Minsmere, Suffolk, England

Since 2011, Strachan has co-presented Springwatch for BBC Two, as well as the adaptions Autumnwatch and Winterwatch. The Watches have been hosted by reserves such as National Arboretum at Westonbirt, Slimbridge reserve, Wild Ken Hill and RSPB Arne.

In February 2013, Strachan released her book Michaela Strachan's Really Wild Adventures. The same year, she presented the six-part series The Great Penguin Rescue on the Eden channel. In 2014, she appeared as a contestant on the second series of the ITV celebrity diving show Splash!. Strachan reached the semi-finals of the series, where she became the fourteenth celebrity to be eliminated. In 2022, Digging For Treasure: Tonight premiered on Channel 5; Strachan co-presented the archaeology series with Dan Walker and archaeologist Raksha Dave. In 2022, Strachan presented Extreme Conservation on BBC World News and BBC Reel.

In March 2024, she was a participant in BBC's Pilgrimage. In April 2024, she appeared, as an enraged ornithologist, in the series 3 episode "The Career Ladder" of the Diane Morgan comedy series Mandy.

In 2025, Strachan and professional partner Mark Hanretty were runners-up in the seventeenth series of Dancing on Ice.

== Personal life ==
Strachan married filmmaker Duncan Chard in 1996; they divorced five years later. Since 2003, Strachan has been in a relationship with Nick Chevallier. On 8 June 2005, she gave birth to the couple's son. The couple live in Hout Bay, Cape Town, with Chevallier's children from his previous relationship. Strachan is a fan of Oxford United F.C.

She is allergic to elephants.

In 2014, she stated that she had had a double mastectomy and reconstructive surgery following a diagnosis of breast cancer.

== Filmography ==
As herself
Year	Title	Role
1986–1989	Wide Awake Club	Co-presenter
1987–1989	Wacaday	Co-presenter
1988–1992	The Hitman and Her	Co-presenter
1989	My Secret Desire	Guest; 1 episode
1989	Michaela's Stamp Channel	Presenter
1989	But Can You Do It On TV?	Presenter
1989–1992	Owl TV	Documentary series
1990	The Krypton Factor	Episode: "Broadcasting Celebrity Special"
1990	WAC '90	Co-presenter
1990–1991	Hey, Hey, It's Saturday!	Co-presenter
1990–1992	Children's Royal Variety Performance	Guest; 3 episodes
1990–1999	Cool Cube	Co-presenter
1990	The Noel Edmonds Saturday Roadshow	Guest; 1 episode
1990	Cluedo	Guest; 1 episode
1990, 1996–1997	Win, Lose or Draw	Guest; 14 episodes
1991	Motormouth	Guest; 1 episode
1991	Naruhodo: The World!	Guest; 1 episode
1991–1996	Go Getters	Co-presenter
1991, 1994–1995	You Bet!	Guest; 3 episodes
1992	Hearts of Gold	Guest; 1 episode
1992	Beetle Drive	Co-presenter
1993	The Big Breakfast	Guest; 1 episode
1993	Going Live!	Guest; 1 episode
1993	Entertainment UK	Guest; 1 episode
1993	Michaela's Map	Presenter
1993	Ratkan	Presenter
1993	The Electric String Vest	Presenter
1993–2006	The Really Wild Show	Presenter
1993–1994	Whale On	Guest; 2 episodes
1994	Live & Kicking	Guest; 1 episode
1994	An Audience with Bob Monkhouse	Audience member
1994	A Word in Your Ear	Guest; 2 episodes
1994	The Hypnotic World of Paul McKenna	Guest; 1 episode
1994	What's Up Doc?	Guest; 2 episodes
1994	Family Fortunes	Guest; 1 episode
1994	Harry's Mad	Guest; 1 episode
1994	Summercrunch	Presenter
1994–1996	The Really Wild Guide to Britain	Presenter
1994–1997	Disney Time	Presenter
1995	Game On	Guest; 1 episode
1995	Blood Under My Skin	Smelly Homeless Person #1; 1 episode
1995	For Amusement Only	Presenter
1995	The Movie Game	Guest; 1 episode
1995	The Ant & Dec Show	Guest; 1 episode
1995	Fully Booked	Guest; 1 episode
1995	Science Zone	Presenter
1996	Pebble Mill at One	Guest; 1 episode
1996, 1998	To Me... To You...	Guest; 2 episodes
1996–1998	Chatterhappy Ponies	Voice role; Sparky
1997	Get Your Own Back	Guest; 1 episode
1997	The Demon Headmaster Takes Over TV	Guest; 1 episode
1997	Timmy Towers	Guest; 1 episode
1997	Lifeline	Guest; 1 episode
1997	Noel's House Party	Guest; 1 episode
1997–1999	Animal Zone	Presenter
1998	The National Lottery Big Ticket	Guest; 1 episode
1998	Telly Addicts	Guest; 1 episode
1998	The Zig and Zag Show	Guest; 1 episode
1998	Club Vegetarian	Presenter
1998	The Fossil Roadshow	Presenter
1998	Orangutan Rescue	Presenter
1998–1999	L&K Friday	Guest; 2 episodes
1998–1999	Can You Keep a Secret?	Presenter
1998	Wildlife Rescue	Presenter
1999	Night Fever	Guest; 1 episode
1999–2000	Auntie's Bloomers	Guest; 3 episodes
1999–2009	Countryfile	Presenter
1999	Shark Encounters	Presenter
2000	This Is Your Life	Episode: "John Craven"
2000	FBi	Guest; 1 episode
2000	Spotlight on Suffering	Documentary
2000	Postcards from the Wild	Presenter
2000–2001	Adopt a Wild Animal	Presenter
2001	I Love the 80's	Presenter
2001	Big 5 Little 5	Presenter
2002	Full Bloom	Presenter
2003–2006	Michaela's Wild Challenge	Presenter
2004	The Way We Went Wild	Documentary
2005–2008	Elephant Diaries	Presenter
2005	The Most Shameful TV Moments Ever	Documentary
2005	The 100 Greatest Family Films	Documentary
2005	2005 TV Moments	Documentary
2007–2009	Orangutan Diary	Presenter
2007–2009	Animal Rescue Squad	Presenter
2007	The Most Annoying TV We Hate to Love	Documentary
2007	Saving Planet Earth UK	Presenter
2008	Hider in the House	Guest; 1 episode
2008	John Nettles Applauds	Guest; 1 episode
2008	Caught on Safari: Live!	Presenter
2008	Michaela's Zoo Babies	Presenter
2009, 2013	The Alan Titchmarsh Show	Guest; 2 episodes
2009	The Funny Side of Animals	Guest; 1 episode
2009	Michaela's Animal Roadtrip	Presenter
2010	Wild Night In	Guest; 1 episode
2010	South Africa's Most Endangered	Presenter
2010	Total Wipeout	Contestant; 1 episode
2010	Animal Families	Presenter
2011–present	Springwatch	Presenter
2011–present	Autumnwatch	Presenter
2011–present	Winterwatch	Presenter
2011–2012	Great British Ghosts	Presenter
2012	The Work Experience	Guest; 1 episode
2012	One Man and His Dog	Presenter
2012–2013	Springwatch: Unsprung	Presenter
2013	Winterwatch: Unsprung	Presenter
2013	Goodbye Granadaland	Documentary
2013	All Star Mr & Mrs	Guest; 1 episode
2013	Celebrity Antiques Road Trip	Guest; 1 episode
2013	The Great Penguin Rescue	Presenter
2013, 2019	Countdown	Dictionary corner; 10 episodes
2014	Splash!	Contestant; series 2
2014	Big Star's Little Star	Guest; 1 episode
2015	Mel & Sue	Guest; 1 episode
2015	The National Lottery Stars	Guest; 1 episode
2016	See Hear	Guest; 1 episode
2014, 2017	Sunday Brunch	Guest; 2 episodes
2014, 2018	Pointless Celebrities	Guest; 2 episodes
2017–2019	Good Morning Britain	Competition presenter; 13 episodes
2017–2019, 2025	The One Show	Guest; 4 episodes
2017–2024	Loose Women	Panelist; 21 episodes
2017, 2019	Lorraine	Guest / Competition presenter; 5 episodes
2018	Central Tonight	Guest; 1 episode
2018	Granada Reports	Guest; 1 episode
2018	Stand Up to Cancer	Guest; 1 episode
2018	Would I Lie to You?	Guest; 1 episode
2018	When TV Animals Go Horribly Wrong	Documentary
2018	Chris & Michaela: Under the Christmas Sky	Presenter
2019	Hypothetical	Guest; 1 episode
2020	Morning Live	Guest; 1 episode
2020	When Classic TV Goes Horribly Wrong	Documentary
2021	This Morning	Guest; 2 episodes
2021	BBC Look East	Guest; 1 episode
2021	When Saturday Night TV Goes Horribly Wrong	Documentary
2021	When TV Cookery Goes Horribly Wrong	Documentary
2021	Tonight Live with Dan Wootton	Guest; 1 episode
2021	Meet South Africa	Presenter
2021–2022	Britain's Favourite 90's Songs	Guest; 8 episodes
2022	All Star Musicals	Participant
2022	Susan Calman's Grand Week by the Sea	Guest; 1 episode
2022	Extreme Conservation: The Maldives	Presenter
2022	Extreme Conservation: Turkey	Presenter
2022	Digging for Treasure	Presenter
2023	Ice Age: A Frozen World	Presenter
2023	Swimming in Sewage: Britain's Water Scandal	Documentary
2013	Goodbye Granadaland	Documentary
2024	Pilgrimage	Pilgrim
2024	Saturday Morning with James Martin	Guest; 1 episode
2024	Richard Osman's House of Games	Participant; 5 episodes
2024	Gary Barlow's Wine Tour: South Africa	Guest; 1 episode
2024	Mandy	Episode: "The Career Ladder"
2025	Dancing on Ice	Contestant; series 17
2025	Ice Age: Apocalypse	Co-presenter

== Stage ==
Year	Title	Role
1985–1986	Seven Brides for Seven Brothers	Liza
1986, 1991	Cinderella	Cinderella
1987, 1998	The Wizard of Oz	Dorothy
1987	Aladdin	Aladdin
1992–1993	Goldilocks and the Three Bears	Goldilocks
1993–1997, 1999, 2001–2002	Peter Pan	Peter Pan

== Discography ==
=== Studio albums ===
Title	Details
Songs from Grease (with Carl Wayne)	Released: 1993; Label: Carlton Sounds; Format: CD, album, stereo

=== Singles ===
List of singles, with selected chart positions
Title	Year	Peak chart positions	Album
Title	Year	UK	Album
"H.A.P.P.Y. Radio"	1989	62	Non-album singles
"Take Good Care of My Heart"	1990	66	Non-album singles
"—" denotes album that did not chart or was not released

== Bibliography ==
- Michaela's Marvellous Makes and Do's (1990)
- Michaela Strachan's Really Wild Adventures (2013)
