= Springwatch =

UK television series

- Also known as: Autumnwatch (2005–2022); Winterwatch (2012–2026)
- Created by: BBC Natural History Unit
- Presented by: Bill Oddie; Simon King; Kate Humble; Chris Packham; Martin Hughes-Games; Michaela Strachan; Gillian Burke; Iolo Williams; Megan McCubbin
- Theme music composer: David Poore
- Country of origin: United Kingdom
- Original language: English

Production
- Executive producer: Rosemary Edwards
- Running time: 60–90 minutes

Original release
- Network: BBC Two; BBC Two HD
- Release: 30 May 2005 – present

Related
- Britain Goes Wild with Bill Oddie; Springwatch Unsprung; Springwatch Extra

Springwatch is a BBC television series which charts the fortunes of wildlife in the United Kingdom during the changing of the seasons. The episodes are broadcast on BBC Two from locations around the country. They require a crew of 100 and over 50 cameras, making them the largest British outside broadcast events on the BBC. Many of the cameras are hidden and operated remotely to record natural behaviour, for example, of birds in their nests and badgers outside their sett.

Each year, the series begins on the late-May bank holiday (the last Monday in May) and is broadcast four nights each week for three weeks. After the success of the first Springwatch in 2005, the BBC commissioned a one-off special, Autumnwatch, which became a full series from 2006 to 2022. Winterwatch ran from 2012 to 2026, broadcast in January or February. The programmes were sometimes known collectively as The Watches.

The BBC discontinued Autumnwatch in 2023, in order to focus resources on Springwatch and Winterwatch, which generally received more viewers. Following the cancellation of Autumnwatch as a standalone programme, the format and title were brought back into use in the form of short reports and features on autumnal nature within The One Show in October 2023. and again in late October 2024. In June 2026 the BBC announced that a new year-round video podcast, titled Naturewatch, would be launched in the autumn, with Winterwatch being discontinued. It confirmed that Springwatch would be returning for a three-week run in May 2027.

Bill Oddie, Kate Humble and Simon King were the presenting team until 2008. Oddie departed as a regular host at the beginning of 2009 (though not by his own choice), to be replaced by Chris Packham. Martin Hughes-Games, formerly a Springwatch producer, also joined the team in 2009. In September 2010, King left the presenting team to pursue other projects. Michaela Strachan filled in for Humble during Autumnwatch 2011, reuniting her with Packham, her former co-host on The Really Wild Show. When Humble left after Springwatch 2012, Strachan became her permanent replacement. Strachan flies in from Cape Town, South Africa, to present the show. Gillian Burke became a regular presenter in 2017, and for Winterwatch 2019 the presenters were joined by Iolo Williams, who had previously been a field reporter. Other regular contributors include cameraman and presenter Gordon Buchanan and sound recordist Chris Watson, who has occasionally appeared on-screen to describe his working methods.

The current presenting team consists of Chris Packham, Michaela Strachan and Iolo Williams, with Megan McCubbin occasionally presenting.

== Forerunners ==
Natural history programmes began as live outside broadcasts on BBC television in the early 1950s, when West Region's only television equipment was a mobile camera unit. The origins of Springwatch can be traced back to the 1970s, when the development of image-intensifying cameras enabled animals to be filmed in the dark. In May 1977, two remote-controlled cameras and a series of infrared lamps were installed outside a badger sett in the Cotswolds. The Natural History Unit broadcast the first live images of wild badgers during a week-long television event called Badgerwatch. Although each programme was only 10 minutes long, it created the template on which Springwatch and all the intervening series have been based, a format which has developed and expanded as technology has improved.

Badgerwatch was followed by Birdwatch, broadcast annually throughout the 1980s and presented by Tony Soper, initially from locations around Britain including Slimbridge, Minsmere, the River Exe, the Farne Islands and Martin Mere. Later series were filmed in Florida, the Netherlands and the Camargue.

In 1988 came Reefwatch, the first ever live underwater broadcast shown on British and American television. It was anchored by Soper, with divers Martha Holmes and Mike deGruy presenting during the Red Sea dive using bubble helmets (another TV first). The BBC broadcast further live series from Africa with Africawatch (1989) and Flamingowatch (1995).

Bill Oddie and Simon King joined forces for the first time to present A Bird in the Nest in 1994, featuring 5 live instalments from nestbox cameras. King also co-presented Beachwatch, a day of live broadcasts from a stretch of Norfolk coastline, which aimed to show how wildlife responded to the changing tide.

The live format was rested until 2003, when it was resurrected with Oddie, King and Kate Humble for Wild in Your Garden. The following year, the show evolved into Britain Goes Wild with Bill Oddie, and was identical to the later Springwatch and Autumnwatch series in all but name.

== Surveys and campaigns ==
From 2005 until 2007, the BBC ran a Springwatch survey in conjunction with the Woodland Trust. Viewers were encouraged to record key events indicating the passage of spring, including the first sign of frogspawn, blossom on hawthorn trees and the arrival of swifts. By comparing the results with previous years, the surveys established that spring was arriving sooner than average. The BBC are no longer involved in the annual survey (now called Nature's Calendar) but the results are still reported on the programme. It remains the largest survey of phenology in the world.

A similar survey existed for Autumnwatch, with the timing of the first oak leaf tint, the ripening of blackberries and the dropping of conkers all being recorded.

The BBC-led Breathing Places campaign was launched during Springwatch 2006. Awards are made to small projects across the country which aim to create small areas of wildlife-friendly habitat, particularly in cities. In the first three phases of the campaign, over £8.5 million of National Lottery funding has been awarded. Local councils and Wildlife Trusts are also involved in the partnership. Breathing Places evolved from an earlier BBC campaign called Make Space for Nature, launched in 2004 to coincide with Britain Goes Wild with Bill Oddie.

The Springwatch brand has expanded to incorporate further TV spin-offs and specials, and also has a strong online presence. The BBC Springwatch website offers further video content and allows viewers and programme makers to interact through a message board, Flickr photography group, blogs and the @BBCSpringwatch and @BBCAutumnwatch Twitter accounts. The executive producer of the three programme strands is Rosemary Edwards (before 2018: Tim Scoones, series launch to 2008 and 2012: Fiona Pitcher) and the score was composed by David Poore. Programmes are made by the BBC Natural History Unit, but were originally commissioned by BBC Learning with the aim of getting viewers to actively participate in wildlife conservation.

== Series overview ==
=== Springwatch ===
Series	Episodes	Originally released		Average UK viewers (millions)
Series	Episodes	First released	Last released	Average UK viewers (millions)
1	12	30 May 2005	16 June 2005	3.41
2	12	29 May 2006	15 June 2006	3.32
3	15	28 May 2007	14 June 2007	3.59
4	12	26 May 2008	12 June 2008	3.39
5	12	25 May 2009	11 June 2009	3.19
6	12	31 May 2010	17 June 2010	2.55
Special		25 April 2011		2.35
7	12	30 May 2011	16 June 2011	2.42
8	12	28 May 2012	14 June 2012	1.92
9	12	27 May 2013	13 June 2013	2.55
10	12	26 May 2014	12 June 2014	2.31
Special		3 April 2015		2.39
11	12	25 May 2015	11 June 2015	2.23
12	12	30 May 2016	12 June 2016	2.29
13	12	29 May 2017	15 June 2017	2.30
14	12	28 May 2018	14 June 2018	1.85
15	12	27 May 2019	13 June 2019	1.86
16	12	26 May 2020	12 June 2020	2.63
17	12	25 May 2021	11 June 2021	TBA
18	12	31 May 2022	17 June 2022	TBA
19	12	30 May 2023	15 June 2023	TBA
20	12	27 May 2024	14 June 2024	TBA
21	12	26 May 2025	12 June 2025	TBA
22	12	25 May 2026	11 June 2026	TBA

==== Series 1 (2005) ====
The first series of Springwatch debuted on BBC Two on 30 May 2005, and finished on 16 June. Bill Oddie and Kate Humble were based at Fishleigh Estate, an organic farm in north-west Devon (the same location had been used for the previous year's Britain Goes Wild with Bill Oddie). Animals filmed included swallows nesting in the barn, blue tit families in nestboxes and great spotted woodpeckers visiting bird feeders. Simon King visited three locations across the country; firstly, the Isle of Mull to watch white-tailed eagles on a nest; secondly, the London Wetland Centre to observe peregrine falcons and red foxes; and finally, the Farne Islands to view the seabird colonies and grey seals. Over 150,000 sightings were reported in the Springwatch survey.

==== Series 2 (2006) ====
The second series of Springwatch was broadcast from 29 May to 15 June 2006. Bill Oddie and Kate Humble again presented from the Fishleigh Estate farm, where more than 50 secret cameras were rigged up to film the day-to-day dramas of nesting birds including pied flycatchers, barn owls and dabchicks. The badgers only made a single live appearance in the whole three weeks. Pre-recorded films featured moles, capercaillies and earwigs. In the Shetland Islands, Simon King followed a family of otters and a host of birds: puffins, great skuas, oystercatchers, merlins and red-throated divers. Springwatch also tracked brent geese on their spring migration from Strangford Lough in Northern Ireland to their breeding grounds in Canada's Queen Elizabeth Islands, via stopovers in Iceland and Greenland.

Live webcams around the country enabled viewers to follow animal stories on the Springwatch website. These included ospreys at Loch Garten in Scotland, red kites at Rockingham Forest in the East Midlands and pipistrelle bats in Cornwall. A spin-off programme titled CBeebies Springwatch aired on the CBeebies channel and Springwatch editions of The Really Wild Show aired on the CBBC channel. The presenters were Justin Fletcher, Nick Baker and Michaela Strachan.

==== Series 3 (2007) ====
For the third series of Springwatch, broadcast from 28 May to 14 June 2007 on BBC Two, Bill Oddie and Kate Humble were again based at the Devon farm. Birds filmed live on their nests included swallows, buzzards, jays, barn owls and jackdaws. Oddie had close encounters with an otter and a kingfisher on the River Torridge, which runs through the farm. Simon King travelled to the Hebridean island of Islay, where he filmed local specialities such as red-billed choughs, corncrakes, hen harriers, golden eagles and common shelducks. The series also featured barn owl chicks at Cornwall's Lost Gardens of Heligan, and cameras captured the moment when one chick killed and ate its younger sibling. Gordon Buchanan filmed urban red foxes in Glasgow for a pre-recorded nightly diary segment.

The 2007 series spawned more spin-offs on other BBC television channels, radio stations and the internet. Springwatch Nightshift broadcast two hours of live footage of badgers, owls and bats on BBC Two each night, and a half-hour weekly review programme aired on Friday evenings on BBC One. CBeebies Springwatch returned to CBeebies for 2007 alongside Springwatch Trackers, which aired on CBBC, presented live from the farm each morning by Steve Backshall and Kirsten O'Brien.

A live outside broadcast from the Springwatch farm featured on Terry Wogan's BBC Radio 2 breakfast show on 13 June, and on BBC Radio 4, a special edition of Nature on 11 June answered listeners' questions about spring.

==== Series 4 (2008) ====
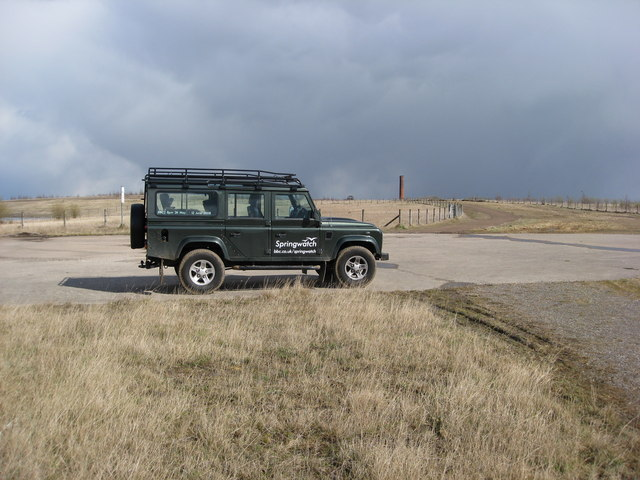
Springwatch vehicle at Pleasley Pit Country Park, Derbyshire

For the fourth series of Springwatch, the production team moved to a new location at the Pensthorpe Natural Park in Norfolk due to a change of ownership at the Fishleigh Estate farm. It was broadcast on BBC Two from 26 May to 12 June. Bill Oddie and Kate Humble watched local birds on the nest, including little ringed plovers, goldcrests and reed buntings, all new species for Springwatch. Swallows, blue tits, great tits, greenfinches, pied wagtails and robins were amongst the returning species. Simon King was based in the Cairngorm National Park, where he brought viewers footage of ospreys with chicks, pine martens, Scottish wildcats, ptarmigan and crested tits. The 2007 edition of CBeebies Springwatch was repeated that year and would be the final year the series would air, being scrapped in favour of Green Balloon Club.

The week after the main series ended, four Springwatch Specials were screened. Humble presented a programme on marine life, Oddie looked at garden wildlife, King focussed on spectacular British wildlife events and Gordon Buchanan met people who have interesting relationships with wildlife.

==== Series 5 (2009) ====
The Springwatch 2009 webcam console

Springwatch returned for its fifth series, broadcast from 25 May to 11 June 2009. Bill Oddie, who had left the programme for personal health reasons, was replaced as the series' co-anchor by Chris Packham. He joined Kate Humble for the show's second year based at Pensthorpe. Simon King toured locations across north and mid-Wales, viewing Anglesey's seabird colonies, goshawks and red kites. His main challenge was to find and film a wild polecat. Wildlife cameraman Gordon Buchanan was based at a badger sett in Essex. Former producer Martin Hughes-Games also joined the team to present a regular feature on conservation holidays, as well as co-hosting the spin-off Springwatch Unsprung programmes. The Springwatch website continued to host regularly updated blogs, message boards and webcams, as well as wildlife information. Over the course of the series, Packham privately set himself the challenge of inserting the titles of songs by The Smiths into the script for each episode.

Three new Springwatch Specials aired after the main series had finished; King revealed some of the "tricks of the trade" of a wildlife cameraman in "Close Encounters"; Hughes-Games revealed Britain's best wildlife locations in "Holidays"; and Buchanan presented a compilation of viewers' videos in "Home Movies".

==== Series 6 (2010) ====
The BBC commissioned a special Snow Watch programme to show how wildlife was affected by the coldest winter weather for 35 years. The programme was created in just five days, and was broadcast on 13 January 2010 in place of a scheduled edition of Natural World. The Points West studio was used for the indoor portion of the show and the normal theme music was replaced for the end credits with the song "Walk Out to Winter" by Aztec Camera.

The sixth, three-week, 2010 edition of Springwatch began airing on BBC Two beginning on 31 May. It was preceded by three special editions, the first of which, Chris Packham's Signs of Change, about climate change, aired on 17 May. Others were shown on 19 and 20 May. The BBC supported the series with a Twitter account, @bbc_springwatch, using the hashtag #springwatch. Packham used a reference to The Cure in each episode. Brett Westwood was among the participants in the series' bird race, and Bill Oddie made a guest appearance in the penultimate episode of the series.

The series was followed on 20 June by a two-hour, live charity appeal tie-in, Wild Night In. Broadcast from London Zoo, it was fronted by Humble, Packham and Hughes-Games, with pre-recorded segments, some featuring David Attenborough. A 90-minute "Springwatch Christmas Special" was broadcast on 29 December. Based at Chris Packham's house in the New Forest, the show included highlights from the 2010 series and specials, plus a number of new reports on topics that had hit the headlines during the year.

==== Series 7 (2011) ====
A Springwatch Easter Special was aired on 25 April 2011 and featured the return of Bill Oddie as a guest presenter.

The full series, presented by Kate Humble, Chris Packham and Martin Hughes-Games, started on Monday 30 May 2011 at 8pm on BBC 2 from a new venue, RSPB Ynys-hir in mid-Wales. During the first week Charlie Hamilton James presented daily updates on the reintroduction of beavers to the United Kingdom. At the end of week one Charlie was set the task of filming beavers live; he succeeded. During week two, Iolo Williams broadcast from Skomer Island. He was filming puffins and during the week introduced a new webcam. The presenter for week three was Liz Bonnin, at Pitsea Landfill site, filming foxes. She was set the task of filming live foxes, and succeeded. The series closed with a montage of clips of the cast "singing" the Tom Jones song It's Not Unusual, whose lyrics had been surreptitiously inserted into the script over the three-week run.

A Christmas Special was broadcast on Boxing Day, 26 December, recorded at Ynys-Hir and presented by Strachan, Packham, Hughes-Games and Humble, and featuring guest appearances by Chris Watson and others as well as a newly filmed sequence from Bill Oddie.

==== Series 8 (2012) ====
Springwatch returned to BBC Two and BBC HD on 28 May 2012, live and direct from Ynys-hir RSPB reserve in Wales for three weeks, Monday to Thursday. Chris Packham and Martin Hughes-Games will present the show, with Kate Humble being replaced by Autumnwatch Live presenter Michaela Strachan. A summer special was announced on the final episode of Springwatch 2012, and Springwatch Guide to Sea Birds was broadcast on 23 August 2012.

Chris Packham secretly introduced the titles of 49 songs and albums by David Bowie into his presentations.

==== Series 9 (2013) ====
The 2013 series of Springwatch returned on 27 May, and once again was broadcast live for three weeks from RSPB Ynys-Hir. Chris Packham, Martin Hughes-Games and Michaela Strachan, returned to present, with Iolo Williams as a roving reporter. A new show called Springwatch in the Afternoon was broadcast across the first two weeks, hosted by Nick Baker, which was broadcast live on Tuesdays, Wednesdays, and Thursdays.

Chris Packham sneaked in references to song titles by The Clash in his presentations.

==== Series 10 (2014) ====
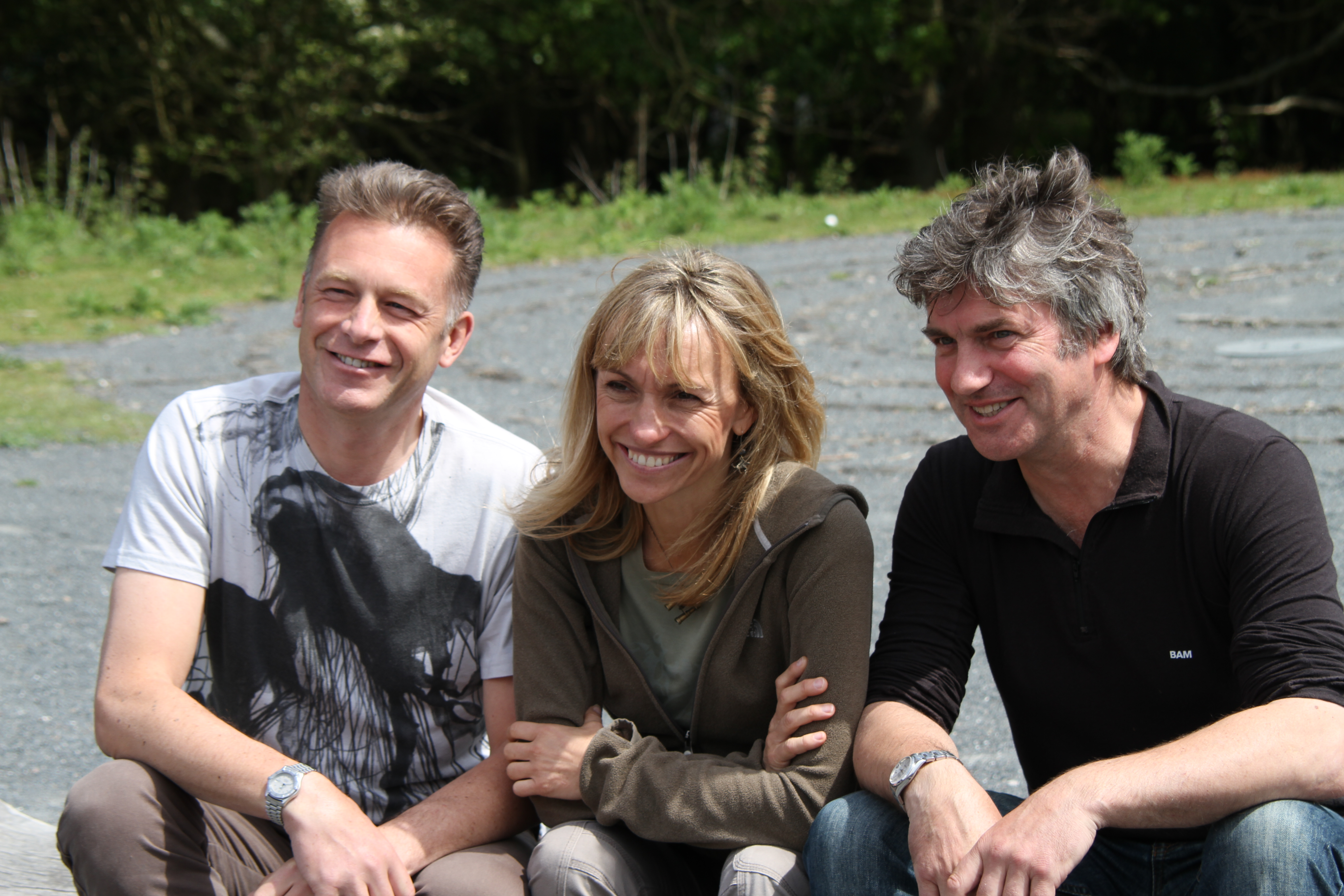
The Springwatch presenters, Chris Packham (left), Michaela Strachan (centre) and Martin Hughes-Games (right), at the 2014 Springwatch media launch, RSPB Minsmere, Suffolk, England

In 2014 Springwatch celebrated its tenth anniversary by moving to a new base at RSPB Minsmere in North Suffolk. The series was broadcast on BBC Two, online and the Red Button for three weeks from 26 May to 12 June 2014. Springwatch Unsprung, hosted by Baker, was shown after the main programme, online and on the BBC Red Button from Mondays to Wednesdays and on BBC Two on Thursdays. Iolo Williams returned as the regular roving reporter, broadcasting live from the west coast of Scotland. Special features included cameraman Doug Allan's underwater footage of grey seals on Lundy, a report on how the wildlife of the Somerset Levels was affected by the winter floods and updates on the latest research into urban foxes and cuckoo migration.

==== Series 11 (2015) ====
A special one-off Springwatch at Easter aired on 3 April 2015. The series returned to RSPB Minsmere on 25 May 2015, with 12 episodes over the next three weeks.

==== Series 12 (2016) ====
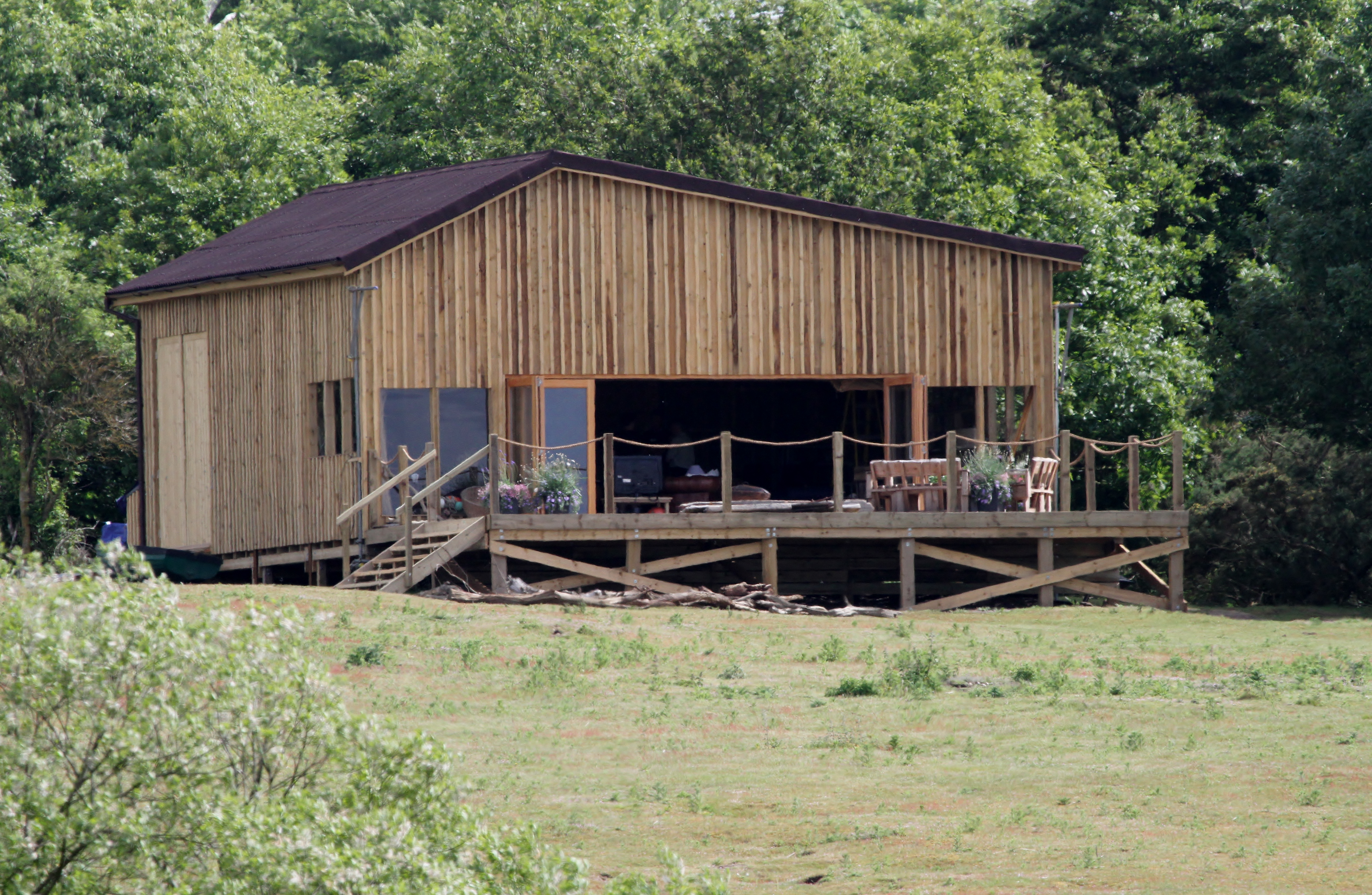
The Springwatch studio building at RSPB Minsmere

Springwatch aired in 2016 between 30 May and 16 June live from RSPB Minsmere.

==== Series 13 (2017) ====
A special one-off Springwatch in Japan: Cherry Blossom Time aired on 21 April 2017 and was presented by regular hosts Chris Packham and Michaela Strachan and guest presenter James Wong.

The farmland of Sherborne Park, Gloucestershire, became the new host site for the main Springwatch series. The programme gained a new host, Gillian Burke.

==== Series 14 (2018) ====
Springwatch, again from Sherborne Park, ran for three weeks, starting on Monday 28 May with a 90-minute extended edition. Martin Hughes-Games was not involved, being replaced by a number of guest presenters, the first of whom was Steve Backshall. Iolo Williams appeared in week two, with Lucy Cooke and Patrick Aryee scheduled for the final week.

==== Series 15 (2019) ====
Springwatch was broadcast from a new site near Nethy Bridge on the edge of the Abernethy Forest in the Cairngorms National Park. Packham, Strachan and Burke continued as presenters and were joined by Iolo Williams.

==== Series 16 (2020) ====
Due to the COVID-19 pandemic, the 2020 series, starting on 25 May, did not come from a central base. Instead each presenter appeared from a location near their home, respecting government guidelines on social distancing. Packham – joined occasionally by his step-daughter Megan McCubbin, a zoologist – was in the New Forest, Williams in Montgomeryshire, and Burke in Cornwall. Although she sent a video message from her home in South Africa, Strachan was unable to return to the UK to participate. Steve Backshall was guest presenter during the first week, from his home on the Thames, with Gordon Buchanan, presenting from Loch Lomond National Park in week two, and Ellie Harrison in the Golden Valley, near Stroud, in week three.

Some films from previous years were re-screened. Additional material was made available on the BBC's iPlayer service.

The first Thursday episode started – at 8pm – with the presenters joining the national "Clap for Our Carers", except for Burke, due to her proximity to wild beavers.

This Series won the British Academy Television Award for Best Live Event in 2021.

==== Series 17 (2021) ====
Packham and Strachan broadcast from the Wild Ken Hill sustainable agriculture in Norfolk, while Iolo Williams was based at Alladale Wilderness Reserve in Sutherland in the north of Scotland. Gillian Burke was at WWT Castle Espie in County Down, Northern Ireland.

==== Series 18 (2022) ====
Packham and Strachan again broadcast from Wild Ken Hill sustainable agriculture in Norfolk; McCubbin did a roadtrip through northern England, visiting Kielder Forest, Hauxley Nature Reserve and Newcastle-upon-Tyne; Williams was again on the Isle of Mull; Gillian Burke did not appear, having also missed Winterwatch 2022.

==== Series 19 (2023) ====
In Series 19, Packham and Strachan presented from RSPB Arne in Dorset, Gillian Burke from North Wales and Megan McCubbin from Devon and Arne; McCubbin was originally not scheduled to appear as a host but replaced Iolo Williams, who missed the series due to ill health. The show received complaints after airing a scene showing a gamekeeper beating a buzzard to death with a stick.

==== Series 20 (2024) ====
Packham, Strachan and Williams returned for a three-week series, again filming at RSPB Arne in Dorset, with Megan McCubbin filming on the Isle of Bute on the west coast of Scotland.

==== Series 21 (2025) ====
Packham and Strachan hosted from the Longshaw Estate, Derbyshire. Williams was in Northern Ireland, including Belfast, Rathlin Island and Mount Stewart. Hannah Stitfall also appeared.

==== Series 22 (2026) ====
On 7 May 2026, it was officially announced on Evening Extra on BBC Radio Ulster that Springwatch 2026 would be based at the National Trust's Crom Estate, located near Newtownbutler in the south-east of County Fermanagh in Northern Ireland. This was the first time that Springwatch was based in Northern Ireland, and the first time that Springwatch was based outside of Great Britain.

=== Autumnwatch ===
Series	Episodes	Originally released		Average UK viewers (millions)
Series	Episodes	First released	Last released	Average UK viewers (millions)
Special		8 November 2005		2.60
1	8	2 October 2006	12 October 2006	3.76
2	8	5 November 2007	14 November 2007	3.52
3	8	27 October 2008	6 November 2008	3.19
4	8	2 October 2009	20 November 2009	2.31
5	8	7 October 2010	25 November 2010	2.18
6	4	7 October 2011	28 November 2011	2.12
7	4	30 October 2012	2 November 2012	2.30
8	4	29 October 2013	1 November 2013	2.48
9	4	28 October 2014	31 October 2014	2.43
10	4	2 November 2015	5 November 2015	2.26
11	4	24 October 2016	27 October 2016	2.73
12	4	23 October 2017	26 October 2017	2.54
13	4	15 October 2018	18 October 2018	1.97
14	4	29 October 2019	1 November 2019	1.83
15	8	27 October 2020	6 November 2020	TBA
16	4	26 October 2021	29 October 2021	TBA
17	4	25 October 2022	28 October 2022	TBA

==== Special (2005) ====
The success of the first series of Springwatch led to the BBC and the Woodland Trust collaborating once again to launch an appeal for sightings of the approach of autumn. The results of the first Autumnwatch survey were presented by Bill Oddie in a one-off programme in November 2005 entitled Wild Autumn with Bill Oddie.

==== Series 1 (2006) ====
For 2006, Autumnwatch was extended to a fortnight-long series, broadcast from 2–12 October. Oddie and Kate Humble were based at Martin Mere wetland reserve in Lancashire, where they awaited the arrival of local wild swans and the return of the brent geese to Northern Island. King watched the red deer rut on the island of Rùm. In addition, cameraman Gordon Buchanan filmed a nightly grey seal diary from the Monarch Islands. British viewers could submit their sightings of natural autumn events on the Autumnwatch website, and the findings were developed into an online map showing the progression of autumn events across the country. This showed a correlation with temperature. Much like with Springwatch, a spin-off show for CBeebies aired, titled CBeebies Autumnwatch.

==== Series 2 (2007) ====
Autumnwatch was broadcast later in the year than the previous series, from 5 to 14 November. Oddie and Humble were based at Martin Mere as for the previous year, but this time King toured some of Britain's best places for viewing wildlife. There were daily pre-recorded sequences from the deer rut in Rùm which had taken place earlier in the season. Instead of airing a new series, the 2006 CBeebies Autumnwatch season was repeated, which caused some parents to complain to the BBC.

==== Series 3 (2008) ====
For Autumnwatch 2008, broadcast from 27 October – 6 November, Oddie and Humble were based at Brownsea Island, one of the few places in southern England where red squirrels can still be seen. King visited a variety of locations around the country, beginning with three days watching fallow deer at Petworth Park and muntjac at Birmingham Airport. He then followed up sightings of otters in a Walsall canal, but although his team found traces of the animals, they didn't manage to film them. During the second week he watched ravens on Anglesey and made two live dives off the south coast of England, managing to find and film a conger eel. Gordon Buchanan travelled to the Farne Islands to film the grey seal colony during the pupping season. Attempts to communicate with Oddie and Humble via a live satellite link, were thwarted on several occasions by bad weather conditions.

Additional content was made available on the Autumnwatch website, including live webcams, extra videos and a blog.

==== Series 4 (2009) ====
In a change from the usual format, the 2009 series of Autumnwatch was broadcast once a week every Friday for eight weeks. Executive producer Tim Scoones attributed the change to the popularity of the series' multiplatform formats, such as its Flickr group. The series ran from 2 October to 20 November 2009. Packham and Humble were based at the BBC Natural History Unit headquarters in Bristol, but owing to the late hour of broadcast, all wildlife footage was prerecorded.

==== Series 5 (2010) ====
The 2010 Autumnwatch series was broadcast every Thursday from 7 October for 8 weeks. It was once again based at from the BBC Natural History Unit in Bristol. Simon King did not participate, and was replaced by a variety of reporters who took his slot each week.

==== Series 6 (2011) ====
Autumnwatch returned with a new name, Autumnwatch Live on 7 October 2011. For the first four weeks it was presented from the National Arboretum at Westonbirt, and for the final four weeks, the Wildfowl and Wetlands Trust's Slimbridge reserve, by Michaela Strachan, Chris Packham and Martin Hughes-Games. Each week there was a guest presenter who focused on one particular aspect of the British countryside. These included Bill Oddie. Kate Humble did not participate due to other projects.

==== Series 7 (2012) ====
The 2012 series of Autumnwatch started on 30 October 2012 and ran for 4 consecutive days. It was being broadcast live from the Aigas Field Centre in the Scottish Highlands. Iolo Williams reported on golden eagles from the Outer Hebrides. John Lister-Kaye, owner of the field centre, also appeared. The final episode was followed by a half-hour Unsprung programme.

==== Series 8 (2013) ====
Autumnwatch returned on 29 October for four nights from a new location at RSPB Leighton Moss in Lancashire, with Unsprung following the final episode. A new live show Autumnwatch Extra aired on the red button and online each day.

==== Series 9 (2014) ====
Autumnwatch 2014 returned to Leighton Moss, Lancashire, with companion Extra and Unsprung strands and webcams.

==== Series 10 (2015) ====
Autumnwatch aired between 2 and 5 November 2015.

==== Series 11 (2016) ====
Autumnwatch moved to RSPB Arne in Dorset.

==== Series 12 (2017) ====
The farmland of Sherborne Park, Gloucestershire became the host site for Autumnwatch. The programme gained a new field reporter, Gillian Burke.

==== Series 13 (2018) ====
Autumnwatch moved outside the UK for the first time, being broadcast from a site on the shores of Squam Lake in New Hampshire, United States, on four consecutive evenings from Monday 15 October. Packham and Strachan were joined by Gillian Burke.

==== Series 14 (2019) ====
Autumnwatch was broadcast from a new site near Nethy Bridge on the edge of the Abernethy Forest in the Cairngorms National Park. Packham, Strachan and Burke continued as presenters and were joined by Iolo Williams.

==== Series 15 (2020) ====
Autumnwatch was broadcast from four locations: Iolo Williams at the Centre for Alternative Technology near Machynlleth; Michaela Strachan at Tenstmuir, Fife; Chris Packham and Megan McCubbin in the New Forest; and Gillian Burke at RSPB Dearne Valley Old Moor, South Yorkshire.

==== Series 16 (2021) ====
Packham and Strachan broadcast from the Wild Ken Hill sustainable agriculture in Norfolk, Megan McCubbin was on the Isle of Mull, while Gillian Burke was at WWT Castle Espie, Northern Ireland. The series was four episodes, and Iolo Williams did not appear; the programme was moved to accommodate FA Cup broadcasts, and Williams was scheduled to lead walks of the Isle of Mull on the days it was broadcasting; he appeared in one prerecorded segment.

==== Series 17 (2022) ====
Packham and Strachan broadcast from the Wild Ken Hill in Norfolk, while Iolo Williams and Gillian Burke were at the Teifi Marshes and Cardigan Bay. Featured creatures included Nigma walckenaeri, edible dormouse and orca. This was the last ever series of Autumnwatch, before being axed.

=== Winterwatch ===
Series	Episodes	Originally released		Average UK viewers (millions)
Series	Episodes	First released	Last released	Average UK viewers (millions)
Special		22 February 2012		2.21
1	4	14 January 2013	17 January 2013	2.66
Special		19 January 2013		3.16
2	4	20 January 2014	23 January 2014	2.56
3	4	19 January 2015	22 January 2015	2.37
4	4	26 January 2016	29 January 2016	2.66
5	4	23 January 2017	26 January 2017	2.59
6	4	29 January 2018	1 February 2018	2.22
7	4	29 January 2019	1 February 2019	2.45
8	4	28 January 2020	31 January 2020	1.71
9	8	19 January 2021	29 January 2021	TBA
10	8	18 January 2022	28 January 2022	TBA
11	8	17 January 2023	27 January 2023	TBA
12	4	16 January 2024	19 January 2024	TBA
13	4	21 January 2025	24 January 2025	TBA
14	4	20 January 2026	23 January 2026	TBA

==== Special (2012) ====
A one-off, hour-long Winterwatch was broadcast by the BBC on 22 February 2012, presented from the Brecon Beacons by Kate Humble, Chris Packham, and Martin Hughes-Games, with filmed segments by Charlie Hamilton James, Maya Plass, Gordon Buchanan, Michaela Strachan and Chris Watson.

==== Series 1 (2013) ====
A four-day Winterwatch aired between 14 and 17 January 2013, again from Aigas, with an Unsprung programme following the final episode. Following that, there was a Winterwatch special, Winterwatch 1963 – The Big Freeze, that was broadcast on 19 January.

==== Series 2 (2014) ====
Winterwatch returned to BBC Two between 20 and 23 January 2014, broadcast live from the Mar Lodge Estate in Aberdeenshire, with Unsprung following the final episode hosted by Nick Baker. There was a special Winterwatch Extra: Garden Birds Special on the BBC Red Button and online from 24 to 26 January 2014 hosted by Euan McIlwraith and Richard Taylor-Jones, from various locations around Great Britain.

==== Series 3 (2015) ====
Winterwatch returned to BBC Two between 19 and 22 January 2015, again broadcast live from the Mar Lodge Estate in Aberdeenshire.

==== Series 4 (2016) ====
The programme was broadcast live from the Mar Lodge Estate between 26 and 29 January 2016.

==== Series 5 (2017) ====
Winterwatch moved to RSPB Arne in Dorset and was broadcast for four evenings from 23 January.

==== Series 6 (2018) ====
Winterwatch was broadcast from Sherborne Park, over four evenings, starting on Monday 29 January, with contributions from Gillian Burke on the island of Islay in the Inner Hebrides.

==== Series 7 (2019) ====
Winterwatch was broadcast over four evenings, starting on 29 January, from a new site near Nethy Bridge on the edge of the Abernethy Forest in the Cairngorms National Park. Packham, Strachan and Burke continued as presenters and were joined by Iolo Williams.

==== Series 8 (2020) ====
Winterwatch was broadcast over four evenings, starting on Tuesday 28 January, from the same site as the previous series.

==== Series 9 (2021) ====
Winterwatch began again on 19 January and was broadcast from the presenters' home areas: Iolo Williams at the Centre for Alternative Technology; Chris Packham and Megan McCubbin in the New Forest; and Gillian Burke at the Cornish beaver reintroduction project. It was shown Tuesday to Friday for two weeks. Michaela Strachan was still in lockdown in South Africa and was not presenting, but made a guest appearance on a pre-recorded video chat with Chris Packham. Sea swimmer Katie Maggs also appeared.

==== Series 10 (2022) ====
The same three locations were used as in Autumnwatch 2021: Chris Packham and Michaela Strachan at Wild Ken Hill; Megan McCubbin at WWT Castle Espie, County Down; and Iolo Williams on the Isle of Mull. Gillian Burke does not appear live due to personal commitments, but supplies some material recorded in the Cotswolds and South West England. The poet Robert Macfarlane also features.

==== Series 11 (2023) ====
Chris Packham and Michaela Strachan were at Wild Ken Hill; Iolo Williams and Gillian Burke at various sites in Edinburgh.

==== Series 12 (2024) ====
For 2024, Winterwatch was reduced to a single week. It was filmed at RSPB Arne in Dorset, with Gillian Burke being based in Orkney.

==== Series 13 (2025) ====
Winterwatch 2025 consisted of four episodes starting on 21 January 2025 broadcast live from RSPB Arne.

==== Series 14 (2026) ====
Winterwatch 2026 consisted of four episodes broadcast live from Mount Stewart, County Down, the first time a series was based in Northern Ireland.

=== Springwatch in Wales ===
In 2024, a new 30 minute spinoff show was announced, comprising old segments from the main show. It followed presenter Iolo Williams who took a look at the natural beauty of Cymru / Wales. The show was not live and aired six episodes on consecutive Sundays at around 16:30, exclusively on BBC One Wales and the whole series was released on BBC iPlayer upon the airing of the first episode.

== Presenters ==
=== Springwatch and Autumnwatch ===
Current presenters	Chris Packham, 2009–present; Michaela Strachan, 2011–present; Iolo Williams, 2019–present; Megan McCubbin, 2020–present
Former presenters	Bill Oddie, 2005–2008; Kate Humble, 2005–2011; Martin Hughes-Games, 2009–2017; Gillian Burke, 2018–2024
Field reporter	Simon King, 2005–2010; Guest reporters (see below), 2010–2016; Gillian Burke, 2017–2018; Hannah Stitfall, 2021–present; Klay Blake, 2026

Following Simon King's departure in 2010, the role of field reporter was filled by various guest presenters; notably Gordon Buchanan, Charlie Hamilton James, Iolo Williams, Liz Bonnin and Michaela Strachan. He was eventually replaced by Gillian Burke seven years later.

Megan McCubbin has become a regular presenter on the programmes, after co-presenting alongside her stepfather in 2020. She has since covered for Gillian Burke, who could not appear in Springwatch or Winterwatch 2022 due to timing constraints. She also covered for Iolo Williams in Springwatch 2023, as he could not present due to health issues.

=== Winterwatch and other editions ===
Britain Goes Wild presenters	Bill Oddie, 2004; Kate Humble, 2004; Simon King, 2004
Snow Watch presenters	Chris Packham, 2010; Kate Humble, 2010; Martin Hughes-Games, 2010
Winterwatch presenters	Chris Packham, 2012–present; Michaela Strachan, 2013–present; Gillian Burke, 2018–present; Iolo Williams, 2018–present; Martin Hughes-Games, 2012–2018; Kate Humble, 2012
Springwatch at Easter	Chris Packham, 2015; Michaela Strachan, 2015; Martin Hughes-Games, 2015; Simon King, 2015
Springwatch in Japan: Cherry Blossom Time	Chris Packham, 2017; Michaela Strachan, 2017; James Wong, 2017

Other presenters involved in the programmes include Roy Dennis, Johnny Kingdom, Leah Gooding, Richard Taylor-Jones, Chris Watson, Doug Allan, Andrew Agnew/PC Plum, Sidney Sloane, Nick Baker (presenter of Springwatch in the Afternoon in 2013 and Springwatch Unsprung in 2014), Euan McIlwraith and Brett Westwood (co-presenters of Springwatch Extra in 2014).

In the 2018 edition of Springwatch, several guest presenters rotated the role alongside Packham and Strachan, including Steve Backshall, Iolo Williams, Lucy Cooke and Patrick Aryee.

For Winterwatch and Autumnwatch 2019 all four presenters were in the same location, with no field reporter. For Springwatch 2019 Gillian Burke was a field reporter for episodes 1 to 11, returning to the main studio for the last show (episode 12).

== Locations ==
Map of Great Britain and Ireland indicating the main locations of "Watch" series.

Year	Series	Base location
2004	Britain Goes Wild	Fishleigh Estate
2005	Springwatch	Fishleigh Estate
2005	Autumnwatch	Fishleigh Estate
2006	Springwatch	Fishleigh Estate
2006	Autumnwatch	Martin Mere
2007	Springwatch	Fishleigh Estate
2007	Autumnwatch	Martin Mere
2008	Springwatch	Pensthorpe Nature Reserve
2008	Autumnwatch	Brownsea Island
2009	Springwatch	Pensthorpe Nature Reserve
2009	Autumnwatch	BBC Natural History Unit
2010	Snow Watch	BBC Natural History Unit
2010	Springwatch	Pensthorpe Nature Reserve
2010	Autumnwatch	BBC Natural History Unit
2011	Springwatch	RSPB Ynys-hir
2011	Autumnwatch	Westonbirt Arboretum; WWT Slimbridge
2012	Winterwatch	Brecon Beacons National Park
2012	Springwatch	RSPB Ynys-hir
2012	Autumnwatch	Aigas Field Centre
2013	Winterwatch	Aigas Field Centre
2013	Springwatch	RSPB Ynys-hir
2013	Autumnwatch	RSPB Leighton Moss
2014	Winterwatch	Mar Lodge Estate
2014	Springwatch	RSPB Minsmere
2014	Autumnwatch	RSPB Leighton Moss
2015	Winterwatch	Mar Lodge Estate
2015	Springwatch at Easter	RSPB Minsmere
2015	Springwatch	RSPB Minsmere
2015	Autumnwatch	WWT Caerlaverock
2016	Winterwatch	Mar Lodge Estate
2016	Springwatch	RSPB Minsmere
2016	Autumnwatch	RSPB Arne
2017	Winterwatch	RSPB Arne
2017	Springwatch	Sherborne Park
2017	Autumnwatch	Sherborne Park
2018	Winterwatch	Sherborne Park
2018	Springwatch	Sherborne Park
2018	Autumnwatch	Squam Lake, New England
2019	Winterwatch	Abernethy Forest
2019	Springwatch	Abernethy Forest
2019	Autumnwatch	Abernethy Forest
2020	Winterwatch	Abernethy Forest
2020	Springwatch	Presenters' home areas (due to COVID-19)
2020	Autumnwatch	Presenters' home areas (due to COVID-19)
2021	Winterwatch	Presenters' home areas (due to COVID-19)
2021	Springwatch	Wild Ken Hill; Alladale Wilderness Reserve; WWT Castle Espie
2021	Autumnwatch	Wild Ken Hill; WWT Castle Espie; Isle of Mull
2022	Winterwatch	Wild Ken Hill; WWT Castle Espie; Isle of Mull
2022	Springwatch	Wild Ken Hill; Isle of Mull; Northumberland
2022	Autumnwatch	Wild Ken Hill; Teifi Marshes and Cardigan Bay
2023	Winterwatch	Wild Ken Hill; Edinburgh
2023	Springwatch	RSPB Arne; North Wales; Isle of Purbeck
2024	Winterwatch	RSPB Arne; Orkney
2024	Springwatch	RSPB Arne; Isle of Bute; Loch Lomond
2025	Winterwatch	RSPB Arne
2025	Springwatch	Longshaw Estate
2026	Winterwatch	NT Mount Stewart
2026	Springwatch	NT Crom Estate

== Unsprung ==
Beginning with the fifth series of Springwatch in 2009, the Springwatch and Autumnwatch series have been accompanied by a live Unsprung programme, a half-hour show that airs once a week and answers viewers' wildlife questions, along with audience surveys and "pub quizzes" filmed in the main studio.

== Book ==
Springwatch and Autumnwatch was published by Collins in April 2007, and features content from all the regular presenters to that date.

== Music ==
Britain Goes Wild
6 second sample of Britain Goes Wild by David Poore.

The theme music was commissioned by the BBC from independent composer David Poore, and was nominated for a Royal Television Society award in 2007.

== Environment ==
In January 2021, Winterwatch began using hydrogen fuel cell technology to power their outside broadcast truck instead of diesel. They also incorporated batteries into the power supply for their three live presenter locations to reduce their fuel consumption.

== Awards and nominations ==
- "Best Pre-school Live Action Series" awarded to CBeebies Springwatch at the 2006 BAFTA Children's Awards. (Producers: Clare Bradley & Tony Reed; Director: Aliex Yuill)
- Springwatch nominated for Best Title Theme at the Royal Television Society Awards in 2007 (Composer: David Poore)
- Cbeebies Autumn Watch nominated for Best Children's Live-Action Series at the 2007 BAFTA Children's Awards. (Producers: Clare Bradley & Helen Darrington; Directors: Lotte Elwell & Susannah Udall)
- 2021 British Academy Television Awards (television BAFTAs): British Academy Television Award for Best Live Event, awarded to Springwatch 2020 (BBC Studios Natural History Unit and The Open University)

== See also ==
- Lambing Live
