= Castle Espie =

Wetland reserve in Northern Ireland

Coordinates: 54.52935°N 5.69810°W

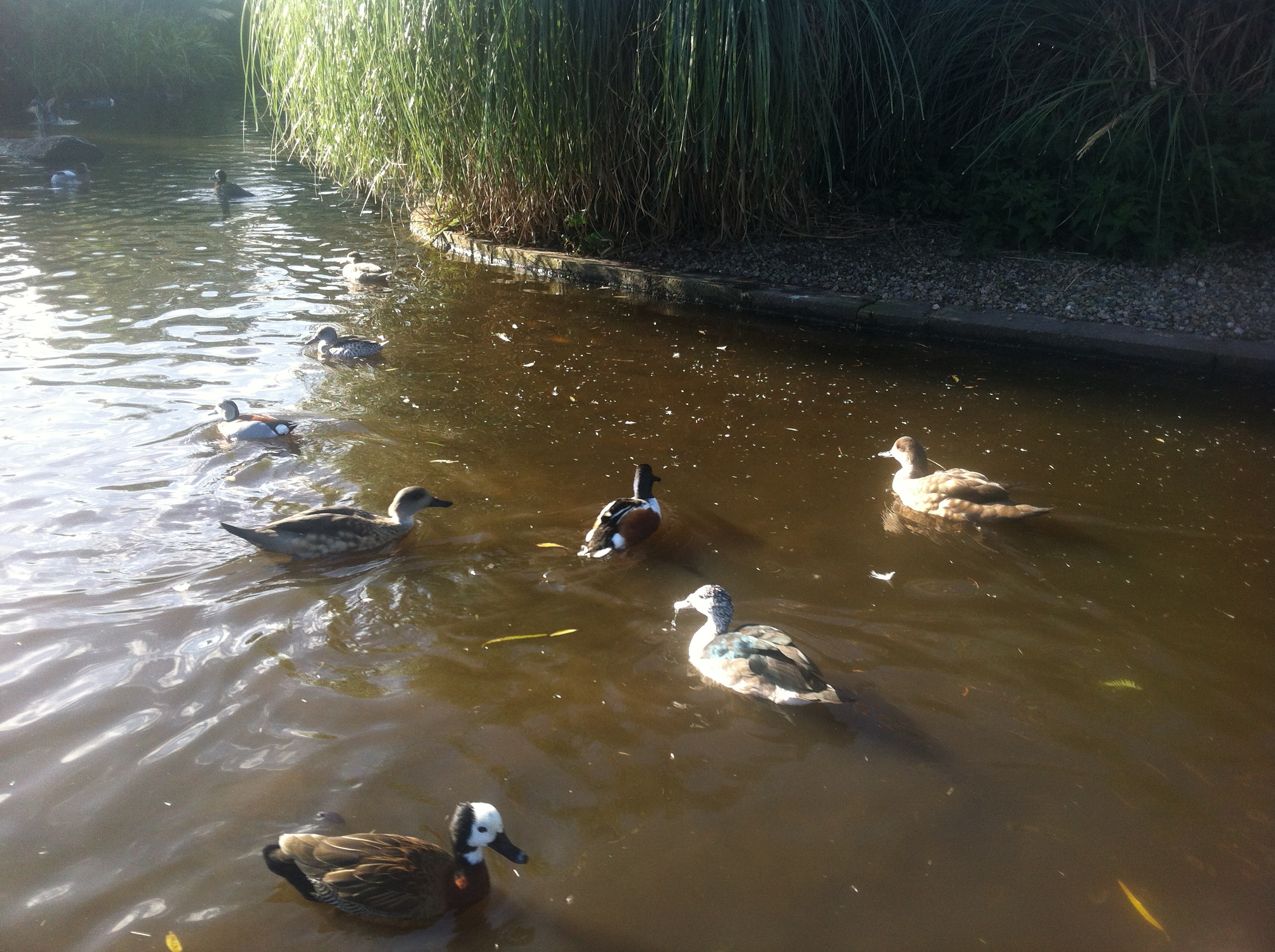
- The ornamental duck pool at Castle Espie
- Type: Conservational charity
- Location(s): WWT Castle Espie, 78 Ballydrain Road, Comber, County Down BT23 6EA
- Website: wwt.org.uk

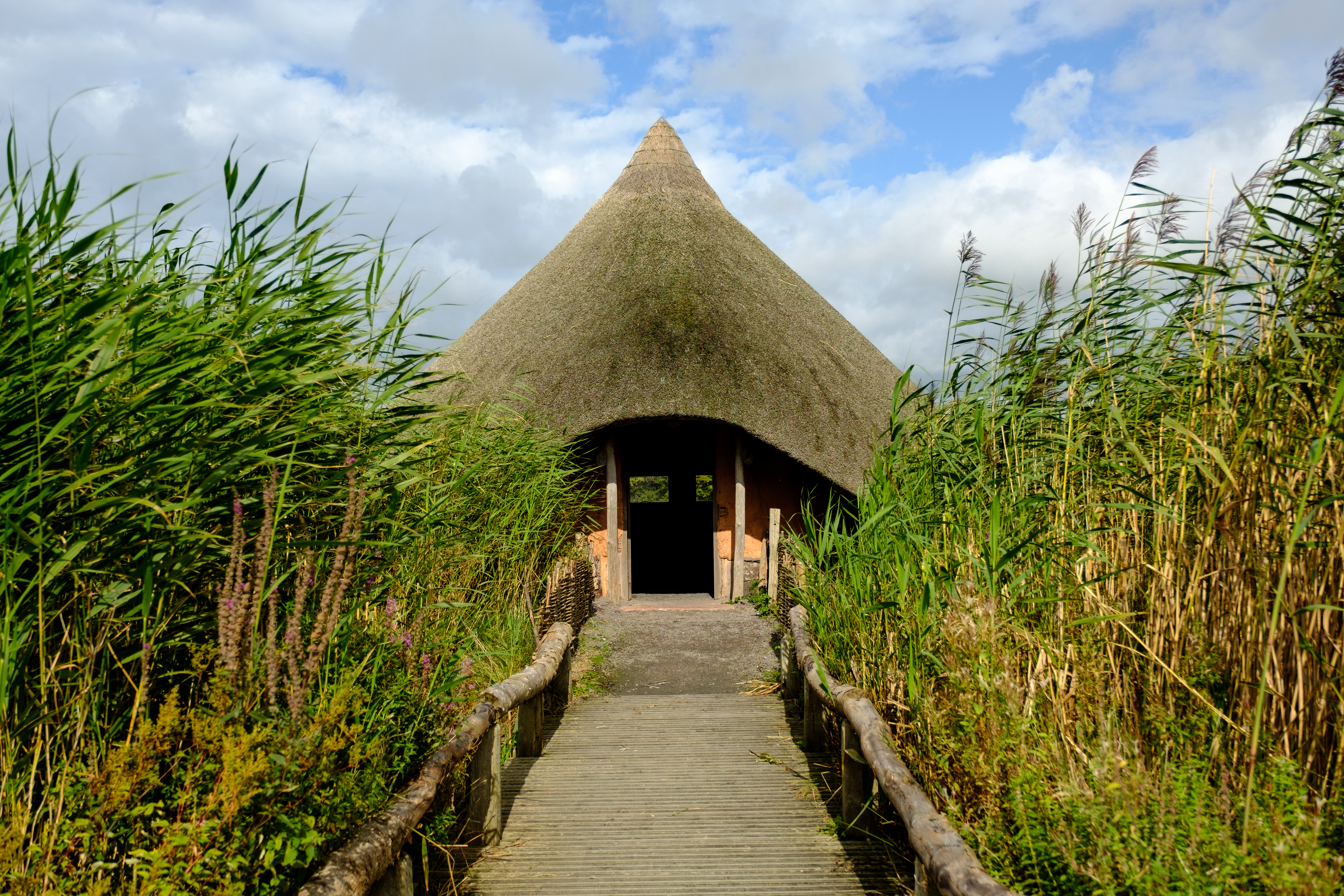
Crannog at Castle Espie

Castle Espie is a wetland reserve managed by the Wildfowl and Wetlands Trust (WWT) on the banks of Strangford Lough, three miles south of Comber, County Down, Northern Ireland, in the townland of the same name. It is part of the Strangford Lough Ramsar Site. It provides an early wintering site for almost the entire Nearctic population of pale-bellied brent geese. The Castle which gave the reserve its name no longer exists.

== Features ==
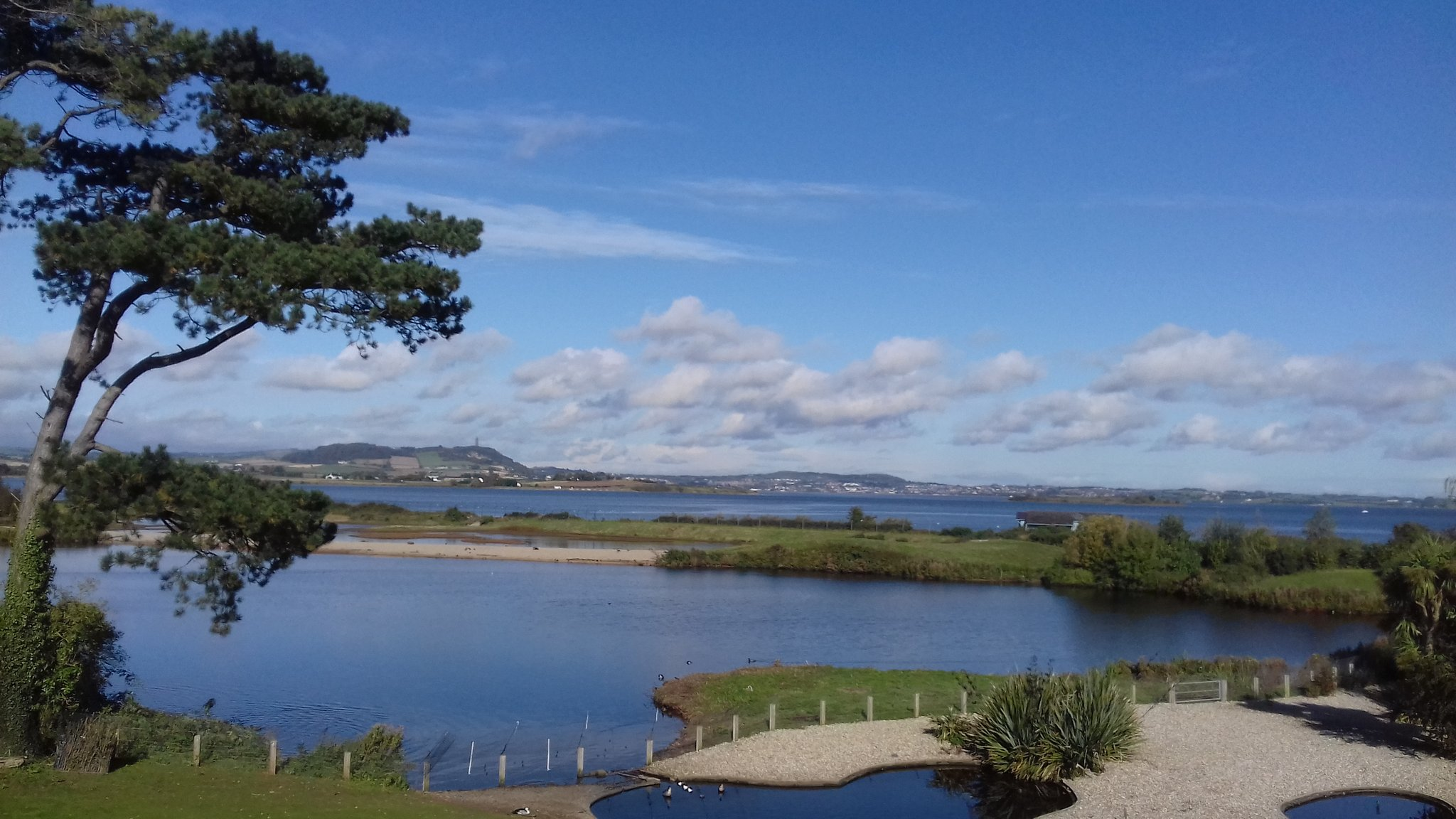
View from visitor centre

It has the largest collection of ducks, geese and swans in Ireland. In addition to the reserve, the site contains The Kingfisher Kitchen, gift and book shop, The Graffan Gallery, exhibition areas, hides, woodland walks, sensory garden, events and activities, free parking, a picnic area and a reconstruction of a Crannog, an ancient type of dwelling found in Scotland and Ireland from the European Neolithic Period to the early 18th century. The Visitor Centre features award-winning sustainable design including rain water harvesting, natural reed bed filtration systems for waste water, solar power and provides sweeping vistas of the northern shore of Strangford lough from the Kingfisher kitchen.

== History ==
There is archaeological evidence from the Mesolithic period at the site.

In the eighteenth and nineteenth centuries, lime was quarried at the site, and processed in Hoffmann kilns. In the nineteenth century, there were also brickworks on the site.

The site has been managed by WWT since 1990.

== Springwatch, Autumnwatch and Winterwatch ==
In 2021 Castle Espie was used as a filming location for the BBC wildlife series Springwatch and Autumnwatch presented by Gillian Burke and in January 2022 Winterwatch presented by Megan McCubbin

== Townland ==
Castle Espie (from Irish Caistéal an Easpaig, meaning 'castle of the bishop') is also a townland of 255 acres in the civil parish of Tullynakill and the historic barony of Castlereagh Lower.
