= Ynys-hir RSPB reserve =

RSPB nature reserve in Ceredigion, Wales

Coordinates: 52.54672°N 3.94516°W

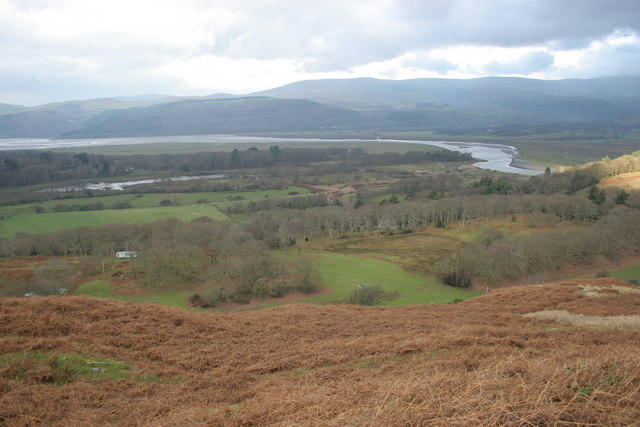
Ynys-hir from above

Ynys-hir RSPB reserve is a nature reserve of the RSPB situated beside the Dyfi estuary in Ceredigion, mid Wales between Aberystwyth and Machynlleth. The reserve covers 550 hectares and includes a variety of habitats extending inland from mudflats and salt marsh through farmland and pools to oak woodland and hillside scrub. Facilities include a small visitor centre and seven hides.

Ynys-hir [ˈə.nɨ̞s hiːr] means "Long Island" in Welsh. The name refers to a wooded ridge which was once surrounded by marshland.

The area was a private estate until it was bought by the RSPB and became a reserve in 1970.

== Wildlife ==
Breeding birds include important numbers of waders such as lapwing and redshank. Little egrets have recently joined grey herons in the heronry. The woodlands hold redstart, wood warbler and pied flycatcher while red kites frequently pass overhead.

Wintering birds include many ducks such as shelduck, wigeon and teal and waders such as oystercatcher and curlew. There are smaller numbers of Greenland white-fronted goose and, in recent years, barnacle goose.

The reserve has also attracted nationally rare bird species, such as a gull-billed tern in July 2015.

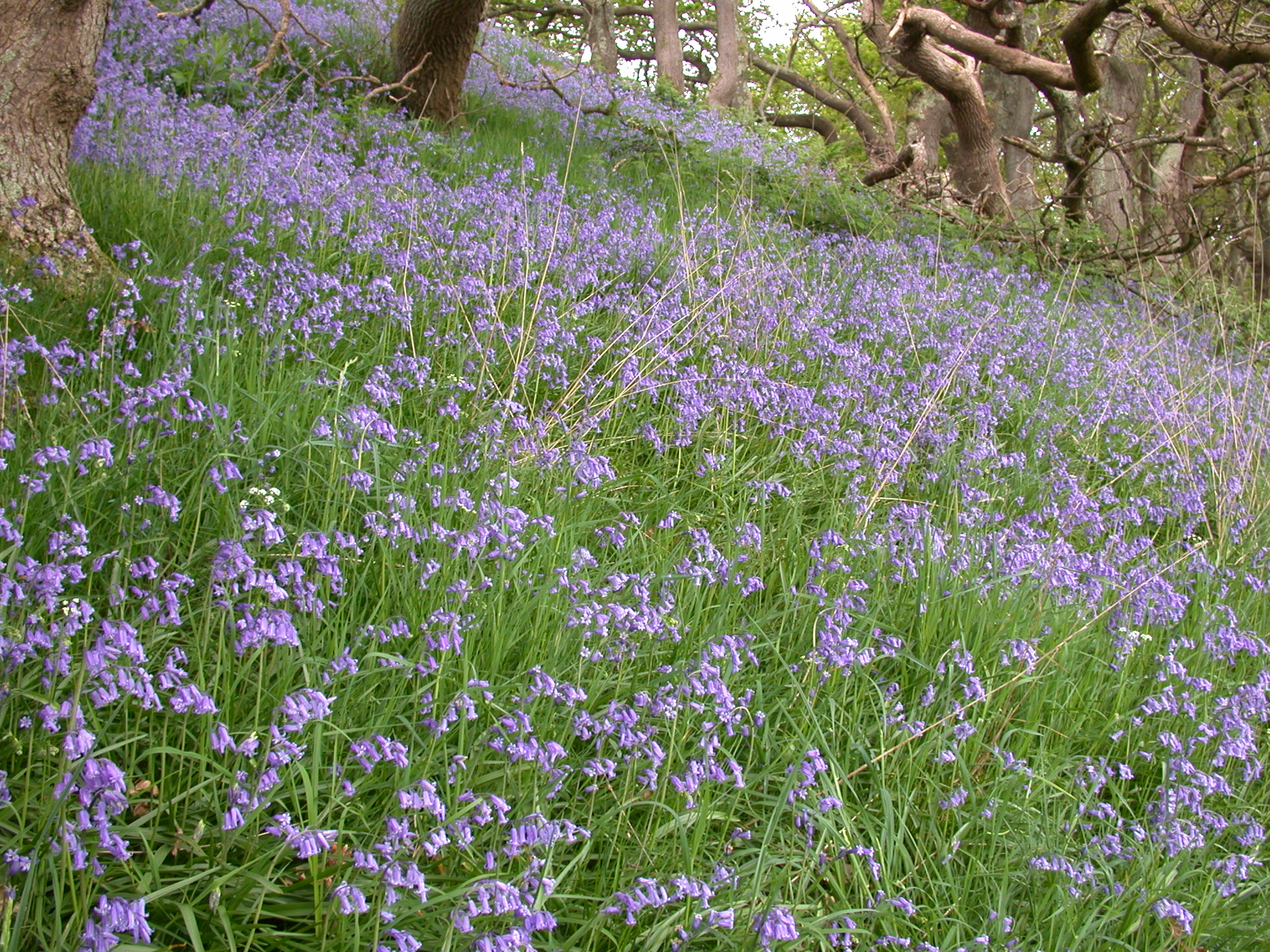
A few of the masses of native bluebells (Hyacinthoides non-scripta) at Ynys-hir in mid-May.

Other wildlife on the reserve includes otter, polecat and hazel dormouse. Among the insects are various dragonflies, damselflies and butterflies and the scarce weevil Procas granulicollis. Among the wild flowers are woodland species such as bluebells and species associated with peat bogs such as sundews, bog asphodel and bog-rosemary.

== History ==
RSPB Ynys-hir was founded on the estate of the late Hugh Maplin, who invited naturalist Bill Condry and his wife Penny to move into one of the estate cottages, Ynys Edwin, in 1959. Condry became the first RSPB warden when they took over the nature reserve in 1969. Condry was one of the main forces in the preservation of the red kite. Condry, who died in 1998 received an hon. MSc from the University of Wales in 1980. He wrote many guides and nature books.

== Media interest ==
The reserve hosted the BBC's Springwatch programme for three years 2011, 2012 and 2013. According to the BBC, the move from Pensthorpe Nature Reserve in Norfolk took a year of planning.

== See also ==
- Dyfi National Nature Reserve
- Dyfi Osprey Project
