= Buglife =

UK-based nature conservation charity

Buglife - The Invertebrate Conservation Trust
- Type: Conservation charity
- Founded: 2002
- Headquarters: Peterborough,
- Area served: United Kingdom
- Key people: Ambassadors: Steve Backshall (President) Nick_Baker_(naturalist), Gillian_Burke, M._G._Leonard, Alan Stubbs
- Revenue: 1,572,352 pound sterling (2016)
- Number of employees: 58 people employed (August 2025)
- Website: www.buglife.org.uk

Buglife – The Invertebrate Conservation Trust (usually referred to simply as Buglife) is a UK-based nature conservation charity.

== Structure ==
Buglife's head office is in Peterborough, England; with additional offices in Scotland, Wales, Northern Ireland and the South West of England.

Buglife is the only organisation in Europe devoted to the conservation of all invertebrates. Actively working to save the UK's rarest little animals; everything from bees to beetles through to worms and woodlice.

Buglife's aim is to prevent invertebrate extinctions and to maintain sustainable populations of invertebrates in the United Kingdom and beyond.

== Operation ==
Activities undertaken by Buglife fall into the following areas:

- Undertaking and promoting study and research
- Promoting habitat management aimed at maintaining and enhancing invertebrate biodiversity
- Publicising invertebrates

== History ==
The Invertebrate Conservation Trust registered as a company in December 2000; becoming the first body to bring together and represent everything concerning invertebrates.

In February 2002 the Invertebrate Conservation Trust employed its first staff member, Matt Shardlow. Two months later the Invertebrate Conservation Trust registered a name change becoming Buglife - The Invertebrate Conservation Trust; commonly known as just Buglife.

During 2003 Buglife focussed on two key campaigns. The first was to champion the importance of Canvey Wick, a brownfield site under threat of development but of huge importance to invertebrates. Home to at least 1500 species of invertebrate, including at least 30 on the UK ‘red list’ of endangered species, after decades of proposed industrial development, Buglife and Canvey Island residents commenced a three year campaign to save the site from the latest business park development threat. The second campaign saw Buglife challenging the Ragwort Bill which aimed to eradicate the plant Ragwort (the exclusive home of 30 bug species); this challenge lead to Defra amending the draft Bill so that it no longer authorised the eradication of Ragwort.

In 2004 Buglife celebrated its official public launch and continued to campaign to save sites of importance for invertebrates, launching Save Aucheninnes Moss in Scotland; 31% of MSPs sign up to Buglife’s motion asking calling for it to be saved from destruction. Work also continued in relation to Ragwort with the Ragwort Code being produced and containing bug-friendly measures. In addition to this the Managing Priority Habitats for Invertebrates CD was released and highlighted in House of Commons by the environment minister as a best practice guide; it was used widely by land managers to improve the management of invertebrate habitats.

2005 saw Buglife welcoming the Site of Special Scientific Interest (SSSI) designation of Canvey Wick by Natural England on 11 February 2005 – the first brownfield site to be protected specifically for its invertebrates. In addition to this the sale of Cypermethrin, for use as a sheep dip, was suspended following a long Buglife campaign and following pressure from Buglife wording was inserted in draft Clean Neighbourhoods Act to ensure that insects in the countryside were safe from being declared a public nuisance.

In September 2011, Buglife contributed to BBC Radio 4's Saving Species programme.

In 2015, Buglife campaigned successfully to stop a building development which had threatened the critically endangered species Nothophantes horridus (also known as the Horrid ground-weaver).

== See also ==
- Butterfly Conservation
- Bumblebee Conservation Trust
- Insect Week
- Xerces Society
