= Hannah Stitfall =

British TV presenter

- Born: 1986 (age 39–40)
- Education: University of the West of England
- Occupations: Television presenter, zoologist, filmmaker, photographer

YouTube information
- Channel: Hannah Stitfall
- Subscribers: 2.23K
- Views: 229K
- Website: www.hannahstitfall.com

Hannah Stitfall (born September 1986) is an English television presenter, wildlife photographer and filmmaker. She is best known for her work with BBC Television shows such as The One Show and Springwatch.

== Career ==
In February 2024, Greenpeace announced that she would be hosting a podcast about the wonders of the oceans.

== Media ==
=== TV Shows ===
Year(s)	Title	Role	Notes
2020 -	Springwatch	Presenter and photographer	BBC2 live broadcast from late May Bank Holiday, four nights each week for three weeks
2021 -	The One Show	Presenter	BBC1 TV chat show aired on weekday evenings at 7pm (GMT)
2020	CBeebies Garden Tales	Presenter	BBC Cbeebies children's show

=== Radio ===
Year(s)	Title	Role	Notes
2019/2020	My Living World	Presenter	BBC Radio 4 show - 8 episodes

== Publications ==
=== Books ===
Date	Title	Subject	Notes
2024	Wild Treasures: A Year of Extraordinary Encounters with Cornwall's Wildlife	Stories and photographs documenting Cornwall's seasonal wildlife	Published on April 25, 2024, by Gaia, 249 pages, Hardcover
