= Iolo Williams =

Welsh nature observer, author and TV presenter (born 1962)

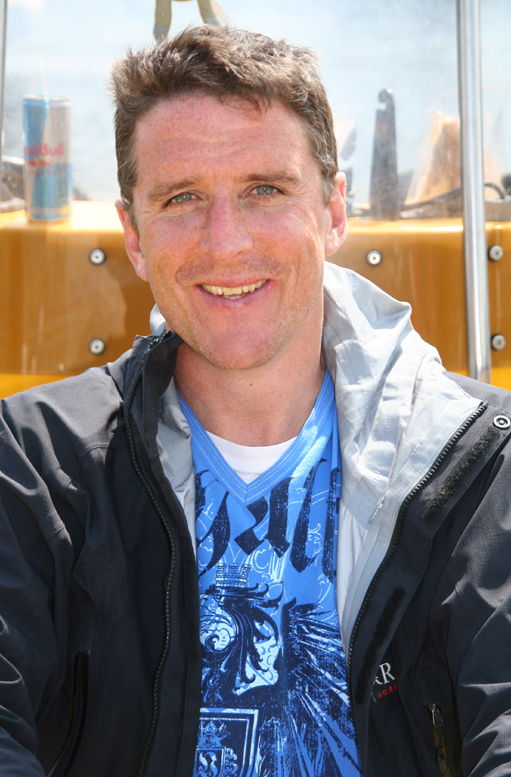
- Williams in 2008
- Born: 22 August 1962 (age 64); Builth Wells, Brecknockshire, Wales
- Education: Llanfyllin High School
- Occupations: ornithologist; nature observer; television presenter; author
- Years active: 1997–present
- Employers: RSPB: 1985–1999; BBC Wales: 1997–present
- Known for: Wildlife presenter
- Spouse: Ceri Williams
- Children: 2
- Website: www.iolowilliams.co.uk

Iolo Tudur Williams (/ˈjɒloʊ/; Welsh pronunciation: ['jɔlɔ] YOLL-oh, born 22 August 1962) is a Welsh ornithologist, nature observer, television presenter and author, best known for his BBC and S4C nature programmes, working in both English and his first language of Welsh. After a 14-year career with the RSPB, in 1999 Williams became a full-time TV presenter. He has written a number of books about the natural world.

== Biography ==
Williams was born in Builth Wells, Brecknockshire, but his family moved to Pembrokeshire, before moving to Montgomeryshire, when he was aged five, to live in Llanwddyn near Lake Vyrnwy. Educated at Llanfyllin High School, after gaining two A-Levels in Biology and French, he almost joined the British Army but instead went to the North East London Polytechnic (now the University of East London), graduating with a degree in Ecology.

=== Career ===
After graduation, Williams worked on a farm and then in the timber trade, before joining the Royal Society for the Protection of Birds (RSPB) in 1985, staying for 14 years working in the field and as a regional co-ordinator. This led to his making regular appearances in the media, making a name for himself as a leading expert on Welsh bird life.

In 1997 he made Visions of Snowdonia with BBC Wales, which followed the lives of six people living and working on the slopes of the country's highest mountain. After making a second series, in 1999 Williams decided to leave the RSPB and pursue a full-time career in the media.

In 2007 he presented Canals of Wales with Iolo Williams, a five-part series looking at the canals of Wales. In 2008 he presented another series focusing on the Welsh landscape, Iolo's Natural History of Wales.

Williams presented Rugged Wales, which aired on BBC Two on 13 and 20 March 2012. In 2013 he presented Iolo's Great Welsh Parks, and in 2015 he presented a second series of the programme. He continued to present series for the BBC which focused on his native Wales, presenting The Brecon Beacons in 2016, then a third series on great Welsh parks. He continued to showcase Welsh wildlife by presenting Iolo's Snowdonia in 2018. The same year saw him travel to Australia to film Wonders of the Great Barrier Reef.

In 2019 Williams became a regular presenter on Winterwatch, Springwatch and Autumnwatch on BBC Two. In 2020 he presented Iolo: The Last Wilderness of Wales, about the wildlife of the Cambrian Mountains. In 2021 he presented a four-part personal view of the natural world of Pembrokeshire in Iolo's Pembrokeshire. In 2023, the BBC aired Iolo's Borderlands, a four-episode series presented by Williams about the wildlife of the Welsh Marches.

=== Awards ===
In 2007 Williams was awarded an honorary fellowship of Bangor University. He received further honorary fellowships from Aberystwyth University in 2015 and the University of South Wales in 2017.

=== Personal life ===
Williams and his wife Ceri live near the town of Newtown, Powys. The couple have two sons (Dewi and Tomos); and had two rescue dogs, Ianto and Gwen, who have both appeared in some of his television series.

Known for frequently wearing shorts for his work, he has, as a result, become a Welsh cult gay icon.

Williams and his wife have built a fully-insulated timber-framed home. They have a wildlife garden, and grow their own vegetables. They compost all their food waste, and recycle everything else, whilst always eating organic and local produce. As a result of this, in a 2011 World Wide Fund for Nature survey of carbon footprints of ecology personalities, Williams and his family were found to have a low rating of 1.81, compared to a Welsh average of 3.0.

Williams offered his support to a Welsh independence march in 2022.

== Filmography ==
=== Television ===
- Secret Life of Birds (BBC)
- Natur Gudd Cymru (S4C)
- Bro (S4C)
- Iolo yn Rwsia (S4C)
- Gwyllt (S4C)
- Natur Anghyfreithlon (S4C)
- Crwydro (S4C)
- Iolo's Special Reserves 2003 (BBC)
- Canals of Wales 2007 (BBC)
- Wild Wales 2009 (BBC)
- Secret Life of Birds 2010 (BBC)
- Wild Winter (BBC)
- Iolo's Welsh Safari 2005 (BBC)
- Iolo's Natural History of Wales 2008 (BBC)
- Iolo ac Indiaid America 2010 (S4C)
- Springwatch 2010-2024 (BBC)
- Rugged Wales 2012 (BBC)
- Iolo's Great Welsh Parks 2013 (BBC)
- Iolo's Snowdonia 2018 (BBC)
- Wonders of the Great Barrier Reef with Iolo Williams 2018 (S4C & BBC)
- Winterwatch 2019-2024 (BBC)
- Iolo: Saving the Land of the Wild (2019)
- Hydref Gwyllt Iolo 2020 (S4C)
- The Last Wilderness of Wales 2020 (BBC)
- Iolo's Pembrokeshire 2021 (BBC)
- Iolo's Anglesey 2022 (BBC)
- Iolo: A Wild Life 2022 (BBC)
- Iolo's Borderlands 2023 (BBC)
- Iolo's Valleys 2024 (BBC)

== Written works ==
- Blwyddyn Iolo, Gwasg Gwyned], 2003
- Crwydro, Hughes a'i Fab, 2004 ISBN 978-0-85284-318-5
- Wild about the Wild, Gwasg Gomer, 2005
- Wild Places Wales, Seren Books, 2016
- Wild Places UK, Seren, 2019
