= Lodge Park =

Lodge Park may refer to:

- Lodge Park, Worcestershire
- Lodge Park and Sherborne Estate
