= Wild in Your Garden =

2003 British television series

Wild In Your Garden was a live BBC Television show, broadcast in 2003.

Presenters Bill Oddie, Kate Humble (both in a suburban garden in Bristol, England) and Simon King (mostly on location nearby) presented live action from a number of hidden cameras in or near nest boxes, badger setts and the like. Short, pre-filmed documentary pieces were also included. It was shown twice a day, but at different times, sometimes after midnight.

A sequel, Britain Goes Wild with Bill Oddie, was broadcast in 2004 and the format eventually developed into the Springwatch series.
