= Wild Wales (TV series) =

BBC television series

DVD box cover

Wild Wales is a television documentary presented by Iolo Williams and produced by the BBC. A total of three hour-long episodes were filmed over a year in a range of locations in Wales, including Snowdonia, Anglesey and the Brecon Beacons.

The show aired on BBC Two in 2010.

== Episodes ==
1. "The Beautiful South"
2. "The Heart of Wales"
3. "The Rugged North West"

== Merchandise ==
A three-disc DVD set of the series was released on 9 April 2012.
