= William Moreton Condry =

English naturalist

- Born: 1 March 1918; Birmingham, England
- Died: 30 May 1998 (aged 80); Morriston Hospital, Swansea, Wales
- Other names: Bill Condry
- Occupation: Naturalist
- Known for: First warden at Ynys-hir

William Moreton Condry MA, MSc (1 March 1918 – 30 May 1998), was a naturalist who was born in Birmingham, England.

He earned degrees from the University of Birmingham, in French, from the University of London, in Latin, and from Aberystwyth University, in history.

Like his parents, he was a pacifist, and, being a conscientious objector worked as a forester in Herefordshire during World War II. He married a woman called Penny in 1946. The next year the West Wales Field Society (later the Dyfed Wildlife Trust) appointed him as their warden for Mid Wales, a post he held until 1956. He also edited their journal, Field Notes.

He was warden at the Royal Society for the Protection of Birds's Ynys-hir reserve from its inception in 1969, until his in 1982, he and Penny having lived at Ynys Edwin cottage there since 1959 at the invitation of Hugh Mappin, the owner of the estate. Condry was one of the main forces in the preservation of the red kite in Wales. He wrote many guides and nature books, including two volumes in Collins' New Naturalist series, Snowdonia National Park (1966) and The Natural History of Wales (1984). Pathway to the Wild (1975) and Wildlife My Life (1995) are autobiographical.

He contributed, fortnightly, to The Guardian's Country Diary column for over forty years, and appeared on several BBC Radio programmes.

He received an honorary MSc from the University of Wales in 1980, and held the position of Vice-President of the West Wales Naturalists' Trust from 1982.

He died from kidney failure on 30 May 1998, at Morriston Hospital. Following cremation at Aberystwyth, his ashes were scattered on Cadair Idris. The William Condry Memorial Lecture is held annually in his honour, and a hide at Ynys-hir is named after him.

== Works ==
- Thoreau. Witherby. 1954. ISBN 978-0854930425.
- Snowdonia National Park. Collins. 1966.
- Birds and Wild Africa. 1967. ISBN 978-0002110754.
- Exploring Wales. Faber & Faber. 1972. ISBN 978-0571099221.
- Countryside Birds. Royal Society for the Protection of Birds. 1972. ISBN 978-0903138024.
- Pathway to the Wild. Faber & Faber. 1975. ISBN 978-0571099344.
- World of a Mountain. Faber & Faber. 1977. ISBN 978-0571107797.
- The Natural History of Wales. Collins. 1982. ISBN 978-0002195683.
- Snowdonia. David and Charles. 1987. ISBN 978-0715387344.
- Wales. Gomer Press. 1991. ISBN 978-0863837814.
- Welsh Country Diary. Gomer Press. 1993. ISBN 978-0863838729.
- Wildlife in our Welsh Parish. Egwlys Fach Women's Institute. 1993.
- Wildlife, My Life. Gomer Press. 1995. ISBN 9781859021828.
- Welsh Country Essays. Gomer Press. 1996. ISBN 978-1859023952.
- Wildflower Safari: The Life of Mary Richards. Gomer Press. 1998. ISBN 9781859025581.
- Heart of the Country: A Photographic Diary of Wales. Gomer Press. 1998. ISBN 978-1859025581.
- A William Condry Reader. Gomer Press. 2015. ISBN 978-1848518834.
