= Britain Goes Wild with Bill Oddie =

- Genre: Documentary
- Directed by: Sue Robinson; David Weir
- Presented by: Bill Oddie
- Country of origin: United Kingdom
- Original language: English

Production
- Production locations: Bass Rock, East Lothian, Scotland, UK
- Running time: 60 minutes

Original release
- Network: BBC
- Release: 31 May – 17 June 2004

Related
- Springwatch

Britain Goes Wild with Bill Oddie is a live BBC TV show, broadcast nightly, Monday – Thursday, from 31 May 2004 to 17 June 2004.

Following on from the previous year's Wild in Your Garden, presenters Bill Oddie, Kate Humble and Simon King spent one hour each evening, describing wildlife and presenting live action from a number of hidden cameras in or near nest boxes, as well as a badger sett. Short, pre-filmed documentary pieces were also included. While Oddie and Humble both presented the series from an organic farm in Devon, England, where the nestboxes and sett were located, King worked on location – at Bass Rock observing gannets in the first week, at a quarry observing a family of peregrine falcons in the second week, at the London Wetlands Centre in the third week, and joining Oddie and Humble on the farm for the final programme.

It set a record for its timeslot of 8pm on BBC Two on its first evening of broadcast of 3.4 million viewers – one million more than the Channel 4 programme showing at that time. It also created a run on nest boxes for wild birds and bumble bees, bird baths and bird feed from suppliers, likened to the Delia power phenomenon created when Delia Smith mentioned the tools and ingredients she was using on her cooking programme Delia's How to Cook.

Oddie presented an update of some of the featured animals later in 2004.

A sequel, Springwatch with Bill Oddie, was broadcast in 2005.

The series' theme music was composed by David Poore, and is still used as the theme for Springwatch and Autumnwatch.
