= Pensthorpe Natural Park =

Nature reserve in Norfolk, England

Coordinates: 52.822°N 0.8881°E

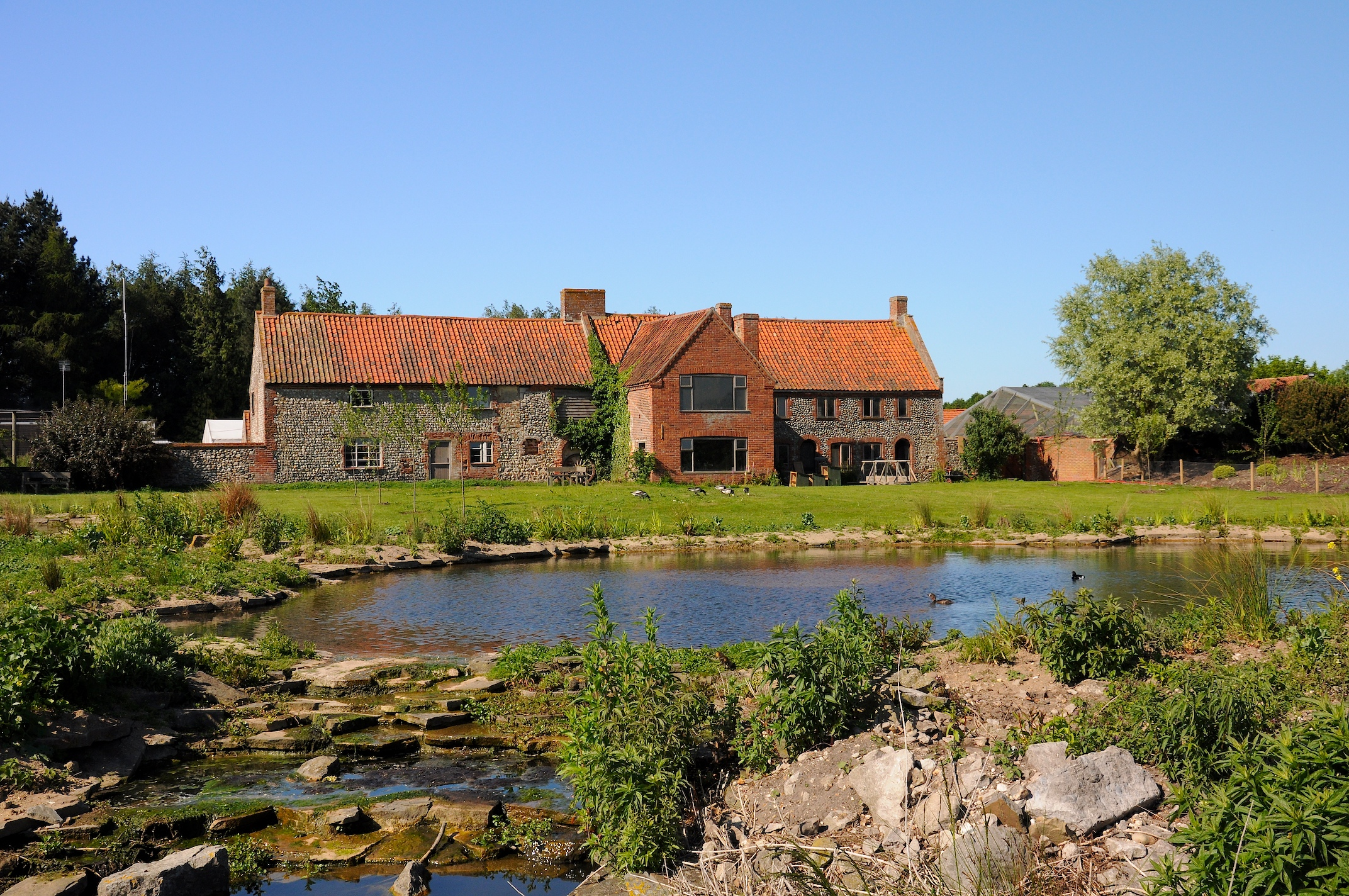
Pensthorpe Natural Park

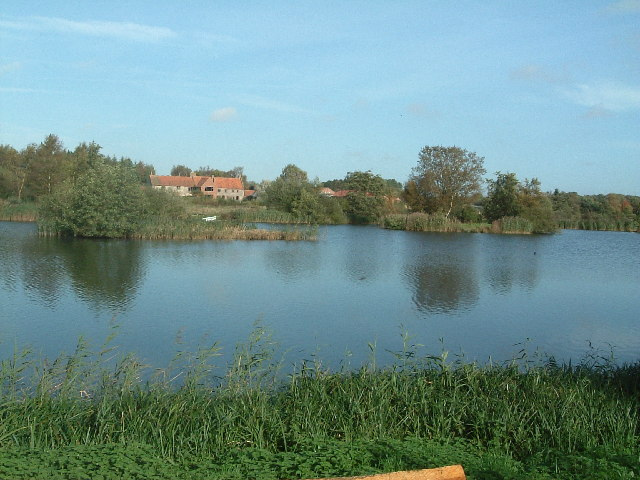
A view across a lake

Pensthorpe Natural Park is located in Pensthorpe, Norfolk, England and is approximately one mile from Fakenham and close to the A1067 road. The park covers 700 acres (280 ha). The River Wensum, which runs through the site, is a designated Special Area of Conservation (SAC).

Pensthorpe Conservation Trust (PCT) was formed in January 2003. It is a charitable trust that works closely with Pensthorpe Natural Park to showcase the importance of species and habitat conservation. The PCT works with partner organisations in national conservation programmes to conserve wetland and farmland bird species. These partnerships include Operation Turtle Dove, The Great Crane Project and re-introduction projects for red squirrels and corncrakes.

== History ==
The site was created as a nature reserve by Bill Makins in the 1980s, before being bought by Bill and Deb Jordan in 2003, of Jordans cereals. During excavations to create the lakes and wader scrapes, one million tons of aggregates were excavated. The work uncovered finds including a hand axe believed to date from 8000 BC. Tusks and the tooth from a woolly mammoth were also found.

== Media ==
The reserve was the location of the BBC programme Springwatch from May 2008 to 2010.

First broadcast in December 2013, the first episode of the BBC television series Great British Garden Revival was based in the reserve.
