= Megan McCubbin =

British zoologist and broadcaster (born 1995)

- Born: 8 February 1995 (age 31); United Kingdom
- Occupations: Zoologist, conservationist, television presenter
- Years active: 2017–present
- Notable work: Springwatch
- Parent: Chris Packham (stepfather)

Megan-Leigh Shannon McCubbin (born 8 February 1995) is an English zoologist, conservationist and television presenter.

== Biography ==
McCubbin was born on 8 February 1995; her mother is Jo McCubbin, a nurse. When Megan was two years old, her mother began dating Chris Packham and they later married. They divorced in 2008.

McCubbin has dyslexia and took Environmental Studies at A-level. A foundation year in Biological Science led her to study Zoology at the University of Liverpool.

In 2017, she hosted an episode of the BBC documentary series Undercover Tourist about the bear bile industry, and became a regular reporter on Al Jazeera's Earthrise programme. She presented an episode of Planet Defenders in which she investigated why protected sharks were being caught and sold as 'Rock Salmon'. With her stepfather Chris Packham, she has co-hosted Springwatch, Autumnwatch and Winterwatch on BBC Two since 2020. In 2021, Packham and McCubbin co-hosted Chris and Meg's Wild Summer for the BBC.

In May and June 2022, McCubbin presented Springwatch from the Kielder Forest, Hauxley Nature Reserve and Newcastle-upon-Tyne. In August 2022, she joined the presenting team on Animal Park, a 15-part series filmed at Longleat in Wiltshire and broadcast daily on BBC One and BBC Two.

In October 2026, the BBC announced that McCubbin will co-present the upcoming wildlife series Naturewatch with her stepfather Chris Packham and Kyle Thomas.

== Books ==
- Packham, Chris; McCubbin, Megan (December 2020). Back to Nature: How to Love Life – and Save It. Two Roads. ISBN 9781529350425.
- An Atlas of Endangered Species. Hachette. 2023. ISBN 9781529369533.
