= Martin Hughes-Games =

British television presenter and producer

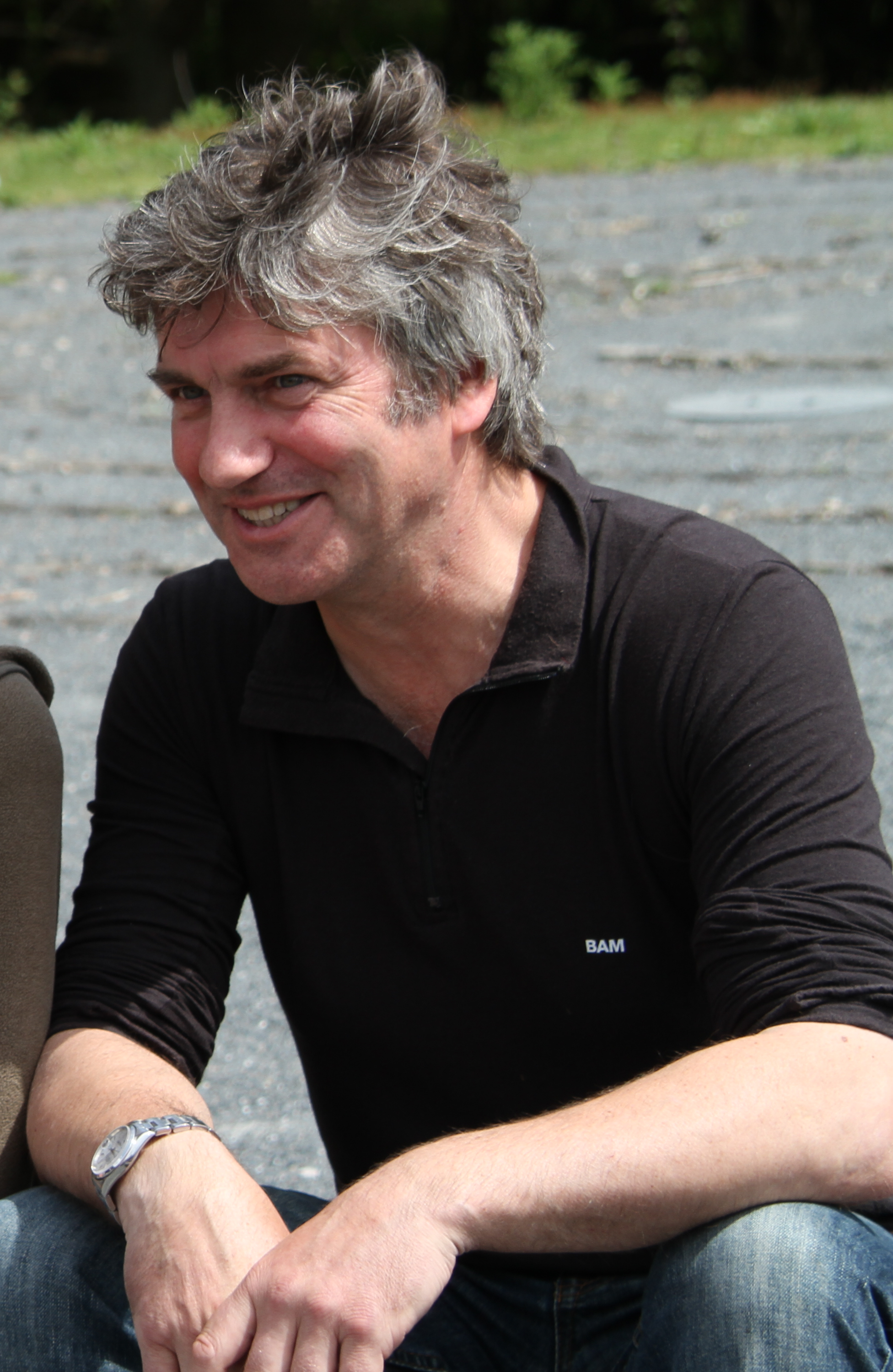
- Hughes-Games in 2014
- Born: 16 April 1956 (age 69)
- Education: Millfield
- Alma mater: Reading University
- Occupations: Television producer and presenter
- Known for: Presenting Springwatch and Autumnwatch
- Website: martinhughesgames.co.uk

Martin Hughes-Games (born 16 April 1956) is a natural history programme producer, presenter and author. He is best known for co-presenting the BBC magazine-style nature series Springwatch and its spin-offs, Winterwatch, Autumnwatch, and Springwatch Unsprung.

== Education ==
Hughes-Games was educated at Millfield School from 1970–1975, followed by the University of Reading, from which he graduated in zoology in 1978, with a 1st Class honours degree.

== Life and career ==
Hughes-Games has worked in television for 30 years. He is an active conservationist and also planted a wood. He was a member of the Springwatch production team from 2006 until 2019. He was also a Series Producer for Shetland Diaries with Simon King (BBC Two) and Incredible Animal Journeys (BBC One, 2006).

He started as a producer, then moved onto co-presenting and producing the BBC's Springwatch and Autumnwatch programmes in May 2009, and also presented a programme entitled Nature's Miracle Babies in 2011.

In addition to presenting, producing and filming, Hughes-Games has written an autobiographical account of his travels, entitled A Wild Life.

In 2018, he was awarded the British Trust for Ornithology's Dilys Breese Medal.

In July 2022, he presented ‘Summer On The Farm’ on Channel 5 alongside Helen Skelton.
