= Arne RSPB reserve =

Nature reserve in Dorset, England

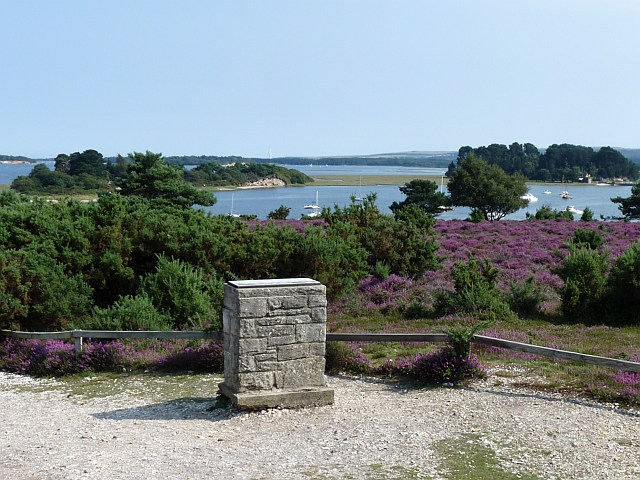
- Viewpoint on the RSPB Arne reserve

- Location within Dorset
- Type: Heath
- Location: Arne, Dorset, England
- Nearest town: Wareham
- Coordinates: 50.683°N 2.04°W
- Area: 5.634 square kilometres (1,392 acres)
- Created: 1966
- Operator: RSPB
- Status: SSSI
- Website: https://www.rspb.org.uk/days-out/reserves/arne

Arne RSPB reserve is a 5.634-square-kilometre (1,392-acre) nature reserve and Site of Special Scientific Interest (SSSI) maintained by the RSPB and located in Dorset. It was notified as an SSSI in 1986 and the estuarine reedbeds within the site are designated as a national nature reserve. The reserve occupies the Arne Peninsula, which protrudes into Poole Harbour. Adjacent to the site is the village of Arne, although the nearest major settlement is the town of Wareham.

The reserve opened in 1966 and is chiefly lowland heath, noted for the rare heather known as Dorset heath (Erica ciliaris), and for its breeding Dartford warblers. 97 pairs of Dartford warblers were reported by the RSPB in its 2025 Wildlife on Reserves report. It also has acid grassland, salt marsh and woodland, with reedbeds adjoining the mudflats of the harbour. Other important species include nightjar, woodlark and, on the mudflats, spoonbill.

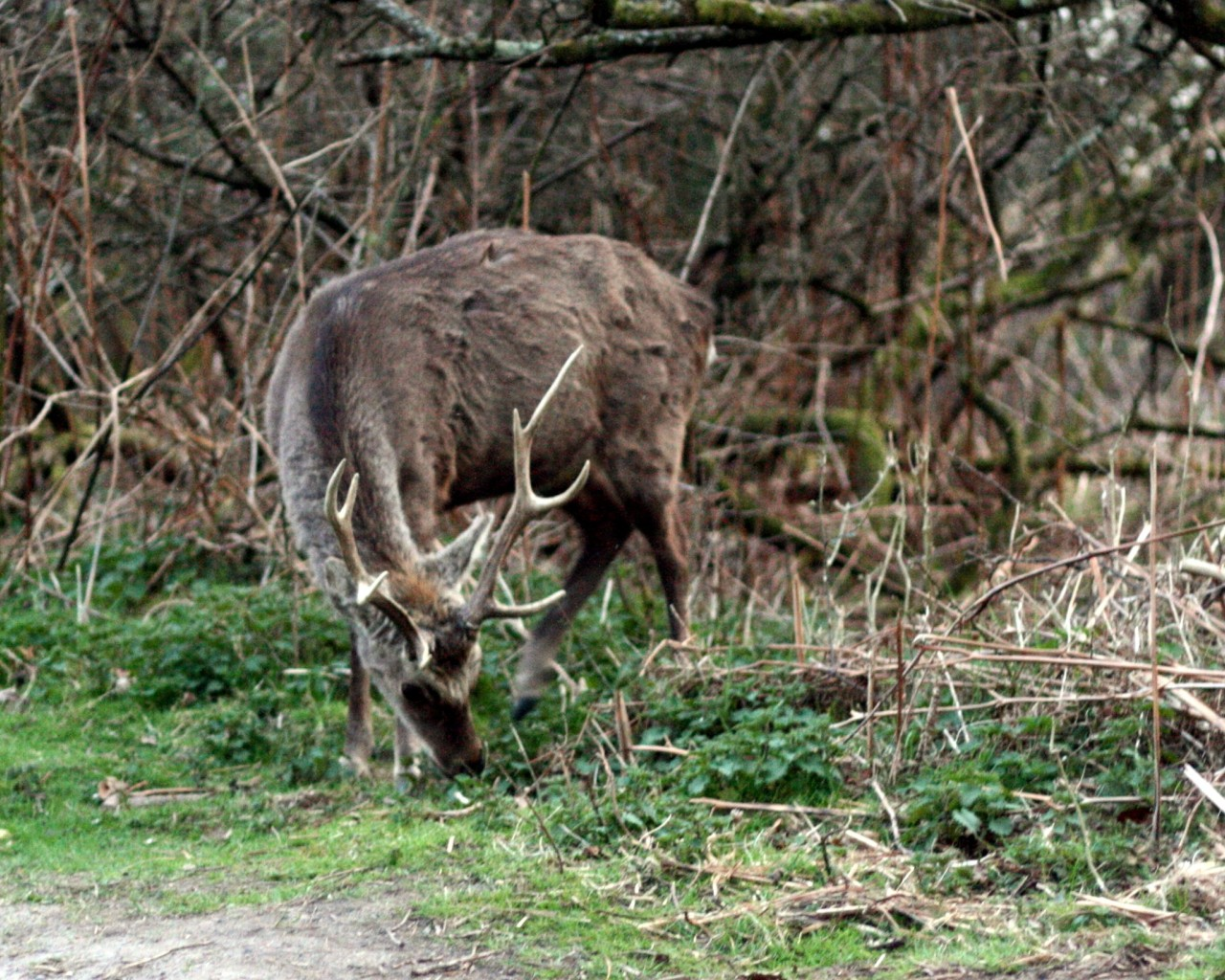
Sika deer stag at Arne RSPB reserve

Over 500 species of vascular plant have been recorded on the reserve since 1966.

The reserve has a substantial herd of sika deer. Originating in East Asia, these animals escaped from deer parks during the 1860s and have now become naturalised, living on the heath and oak woodland of the site.

Arne is renowned for its natural environment, and has been featured on the BBC's Countryfile and Winterwatch programmes. Starting on Monday 29 May, BBC's Springwatch broadcast from Arne over a 3 week period.
