= The Really Wild Show =

- Country of origin: United Kingdom
- Original language: English
- No. of series: 19; 2 (Roadshow)
- No. of episodes: 218; 19 (Roadshow); 31 (Special)

Production
- Running time: approx. 25 min.

Original release
- Network: BBC; CBBC
- Release: 21 January 1986 – 18 May 2006

Related
- Deadly (2009–)

The Really Wild Show was a long-running British television show about wildlife, broadcast by the BBC as part of their CBBC service to children. It also runs on Animal Planet in the US.

The show was broadcast each year from 21 January 1986. In April 2006 the BBC announced that the show would be axed that summer, and as such the last episode was shown in May 2006, giving the show a run of 20 years.

However, in July 2017, it was announced that the BBC were in talks with Chris Packham and Michaela Strachan to bring the show back.

The theme tune used was extracts taken from the start and end of the track ELLOVEE-EE by Tony Sherman.

== Presenters ==
Presenters have included:

- Nicola Davies (1986–1990)
- Terry Nutkins (1986–1993)
- Chris Packham (1986–1995)
- Sue Dawson (1990–1993)
- Howie Watkins (1993–2000)
- Michaela Strachan (1993–2006)
- Janice Acquah (1996–1999)
- Nick Baker (1996–2006)
- Chris Lambert (Co-host, 1997–2000)
- Dominic Wood (Co-host, 2001)
- Eils Hewitt (2002–2004)
- Steve Backshall (2004–2006)

=== Table ===
Year	Main Presenter(s)			Co-host
1986	Nicola Davies	Terry Nutkins	Chris Packham	N/A
1987	Nicola Davies	Terry Nutkins	Chris Packham	N/A
1988	Nicola Davies	Terry Nutkins	Chris Packham	N/A
1989	Nicola Davies	Terry Nutkins	Chris Packham	N/A
1990	Sue Dawson	Terry Nutkins	Chris Packham	N/A
1991	Sue Dawson	Terry Nutkins	Chris Packham	N/A
1992	Sue Dawson	Terry Nutkins	Chris Packham	N/A
1993	Howie Watkins	Michaela Strachan	Chris Packham	N/A
1994	Howie Watkins	Michaela Strachan	Chris Packham	N/A
1995	Howie Watkins	Michaela Strachan	Chris Packham	N/A
1996	Howie Watkins	Michaela Strachan	Nick Baker	N/A
1997	Howie Watkins	Michaela Strachan	Nick Baker	Chris Lambert
1998	Howie Watkins	Michaela Strachan	Nick Baker	Chris Lambert
1999	Howie Watkins	Michaela Strachan	Nick Baker	Chris Lambert
2000	Janice Acquah	Michaela Strachan	Nick Baker	Chris Lambert
2001	Janice Acquah	Michaela Strachan	Nick Baker	Dominic Wood
2002	Eils Hewitt	Michaela Strachan	Nick Baker	
2003	Eils Hewitt	Michaela Strachan	Nick Baker	
2004	Steve Backshall	Michaela Strachan	Nick Baker	
2005	Steve Backshall	Michaela Strachan	Nick Baker	
2006	Steve Backshall	Michaela Strachan	Nick Baker	

== Transmission guide ==
Series	No. of editions	Aired
1	7	21 January 1986 – 4 March 1986
2	9	30 December 1986 – 24 February 1987
3	9	5 January 1988 – 1 March 1988
4	10	24 January 1989 – 28 March 1989
5	8	13 February 1990 – 29 March 1990
6	12	8 January 1993 – 2 April 1993
7	12	5 January 1994 – 23 March 1994
8	12	4 January 1995 – 22 March 1995
9	10	4 January 1996 – 21 March 1996
10	13	2 January 1997 – 27 March 1997
11	13	6 January 1998 – 31 March 1998
12	13	5 January 1999 – 30 March 1999
13	11	4 January 2000 – 14 March 2000
14	12	2 January 2001 – 20 March 2001
15	13	5 April 2002 – 2 July 2002
16	12	29 April 2003 – 15 July 2003
17	13	6 April 2004 – 29 July 2004
18	15	3 April 2005 – 3 July 2005
19	15	24 April 2006 – 18 May 2006

The Really Wild Roadshow

Series	No. of editions	Aired
1	9	29 January 1991 – 26 March 1991
2	10	28 January 1992 – 31 March 1992

=== Specials ===
Entitle	Date	Synopsis
The Really Wild Dinosaur Show	27 December 1990	
South Africa	23 March 1994	
Tigers Special	5 April 1999	
UK Wild 2000	2 January 2000	From a hot air balloon Michaela encourages children on the UK to track, log and document wildlife, with reports from Nick Baker and Howie Watkins. The introduction sequence was changed from its normal show title to 'UK WILD 2000!'
Primates Special	21 March 2000	
Thai Elephant Special	27 March 2001	
Antarctica Special	5 April 2002	
China Bears Special	2 January 2003	
Circus Special	22 July 2003	
Reef Special	6 July 2004	Michaela goes to the exotic location of Malaysia where she takes a splash to investigate the coral reefs. As well as finding out what threatens this underwater paradise Michaela goes in search of hammerhead sharks.
Pride Special	27 December 2004	Michaela enjoys exclusive access to the set of Pride, a family film about a group of lions.
Tasmania Special	10 July 2005	Nick travels to Tasmania to check out a mystery disease that is threatening the future of the island's most famous animal, the Tasmanian Devil. He works with wildlife experts and scientists as they investigate the tragedy surrounding this creature and battle to save it from extinction.

=== Compilations ===
- Wildest Hits 1 – series compilation: 10 editions from 17 April 2000 to 28 April 2000
- Wildest Hits 2 – series compilation: 10 editions from 9 April 2001 to 20 April 2001

== Awards ==
The programme has been nominated for several BAFTA awards, and won three:

- 1987 – Won BAFTA TV Award: Best Children's Programme (Factual)
- 1988 – Won BAFTA TV Award: Best Children's Programme (Documentary/Educational)
- 1990 – Won BAFTA TV Award: Best Children's Programme (Documentary/Educational)
- 1994 – Nominated for BAFTA TV Award: Best Children's Programme (Factual)
- 2002 – Nominated for BAFTA Children's Award: Best Factual
- 2003 – Nominated for BAFTA Children's Award: Best Factual

== Ratings (CBBC Channel) ==
Figures come from BARB

Saturday 2 March 2002 – 60,000 (7th most watched on CBBC that week)
Sunday 17 March 2002 – 40,000 (9th most watched on CBBC that week)
Saturday 16 March 2002 – 30,000 (10th most watched on CBBC that week)
Saturday 4 May 2002 – 30,000 (4th most watched on CBBC that week)
