= Nick Baker (naturalist) =

English naturalist and television presenter

- Born: 22 April 1972 (age 54); Surrey, England
- Height: 5 ft 10 in (1.78 m)
- Spouse: Ceri Baker (2009–present)

Nicholas Rowan Baker (born 22 April 1972) is an English naturalist and television presenter, notably on Children's BBC's The Really Wild Show.

== Early life ==
Baker graduated from the University of Exeter in 1993 with a degree in biological sciences, but was a keen naturalist from an early age. He co-founded Exeter University's Bug Club and was a member of the Royal Entomological Society's Youth Development Committee.

As a field naturalist, he has researched the high brown fritillary butterfly on Dartmoor and worked with badgers, also in Devon.

== Career ==
=== BBC ===
In Nick Baker's Under the Skin on BBC Two, Baker attempted to get under the skin of animals such as grizzly bears, penguins, rattlesnakes and rhinos - examining their habitats and behaviour in his own way.

In 1999, Baker worked on two science series. He presented Twister and joined the presenting team of the science series, Tomorrow's World. Other ventures have included co-presenting BBC Two's Watch Out with Simon King.

Nick Baker's Weird Creatures was frequently ridiculed on Harry Hill's TV Burp. Selections of the show were shown featuring Nick Baker performing poorly, or where a mundane or disappointing animal is featured. This included one episode where Nick went to find a basking shark off the coast of Cornwall, but instead found only otters, seagulls and a dog. After the last of the episodes had been shown Nick Baker appeared on TV Burp and called Hill a 'cheeky git', after throwing a custard pie in Harry's face at the end of a musical number.

=== Nature conservation ===
Nick Baker is the Vice President of the national wildlife charity, Butterfly Conservation. He is former president and current vice president of Buglife, vice president of the Royal Society for the Protection of Birds and is a member of BirdLife International and the Field Studies Council. He is Patron of the Amateur Entomologists' Society.

=== Radio ===
Baker is a regular contributor to Radio 4's The Natural History Programme and writes for many publications including the BBC Wildlife Magazine, Wildlife Watch, RSPB's Bird and Birdlife magazines, the Young Telegraph, the Bug Club magazine, Wild About Animals and FBX magazine.

=== Publications ===
Baker wrote Baker's Bug Book and the Natural History Almanac for the UK. He has also been involved in Five and Discovery Channel productions and has worked for National Geographic.

=== Education ===
He regularly tours schools with his animals to educate school children and often works with the RSPB.

Baker lives in Chagford on Dartmoor along with a growing menagerie of small animals including spiders, scorpions, stick insects, amphibians, reptiles, butterflies and moths. He keeps pet leeches in the fridge at home and often feeds them by attaching them to his leg. Among his favourites are cane toads and a collection of hissing cockroaches.

== Personal life ==
Baker married long-term girlfriend Ceri in 2009 at Tavistock Register Office. The couple originally met after Ceri was in the crowd at a gig that Nick, then an amateur musician, was playing with his band in Chagford's Jubilee Hall. They have a daughter together.
