= Wild Ken Hill =

Regenerative agriculture project in Norfolk, England

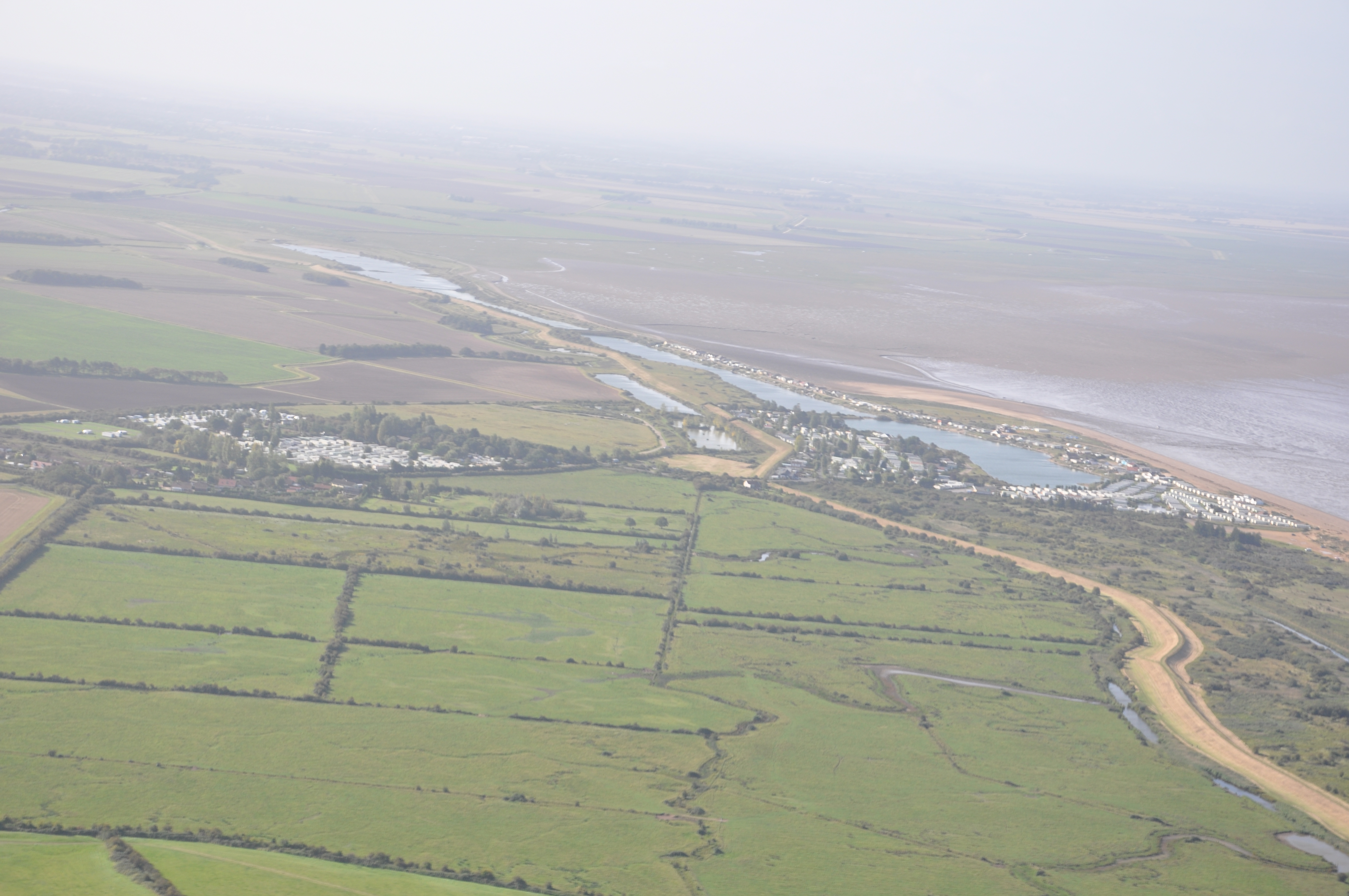
- Aerial view of part of Wild Ken Hill, 2011

- Location within Norfolk
- Town/City: Heacham Bottom Farm, Lynn Road, Snettisham, PE31 7PQ
- Province: Norfolk
- Country: United Kingdom
- OS grid: TF6795435823
- Coordinates: 52°53′36″N 0°29′49″E
- Established: 2019 (as Wild Ken Hill)
- Owner: Buscall family
- Area: 4,000 acres (1,600 ha)
- Produces: wheat
- Website: wildkenhill.co.uk

Wild Ken Hill is a rewilding and regenerative agriculture project located in west Norfolk, England, at the edge of The Wash.

== History ==
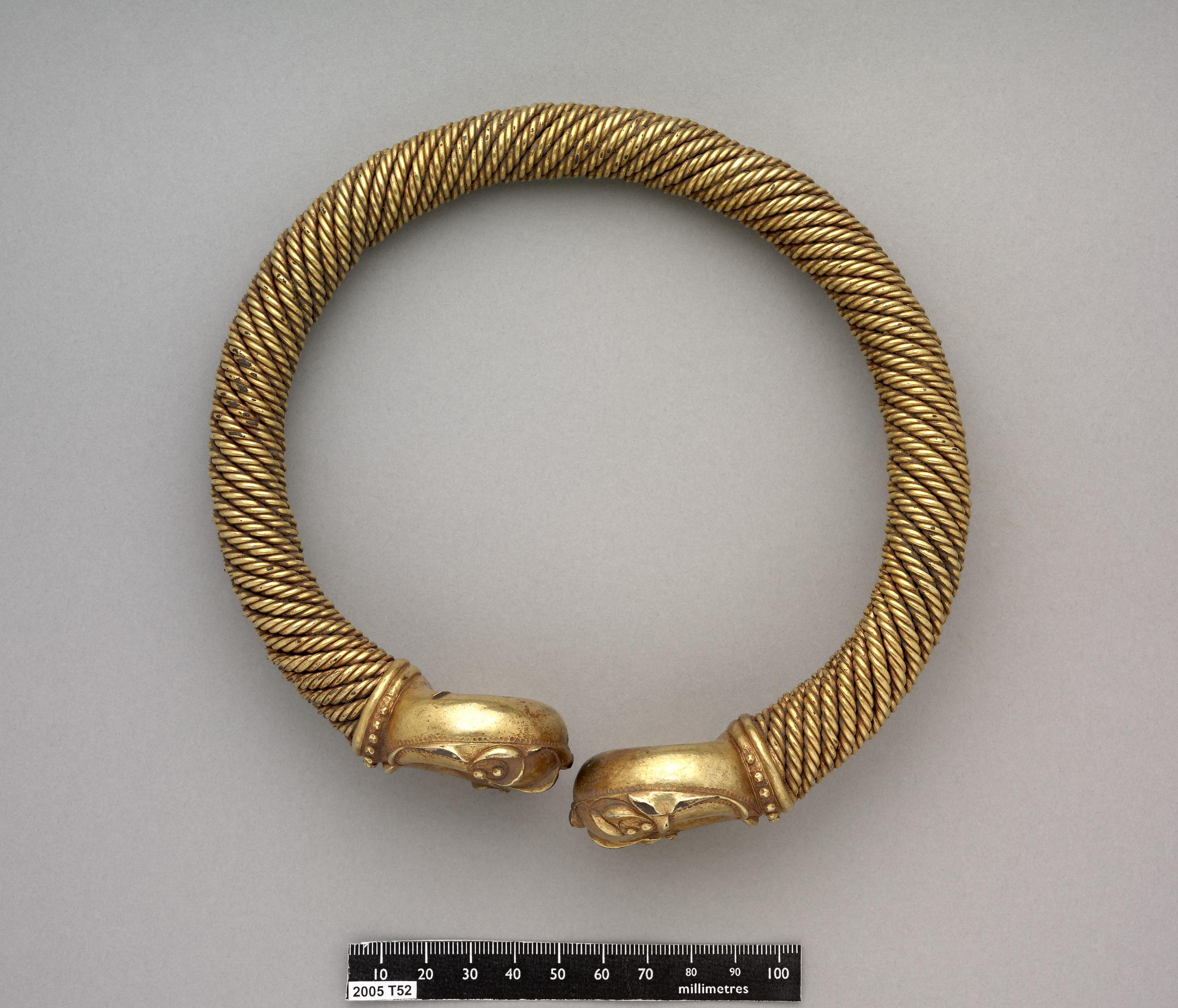
Iron Age torc from Ken Hill

The name Ken Hill probably derives from a chieftain or landowner with the Anglo-Saxon name Cena. The site has been inhabited from ancient times, with hoards including gold torcs, ingot rings, coins, bracelets and scrap metal from the last two centuries BC being found by archaeologists at Ken Hill.

The farm has been owned by the Buscall family since the 1870s.

== The farm ==
The problem in the UK is not that we do not grow enough food. We don’t grow the right food, we waste vast amounts of food (£13bn per year), and we do not distribute it fairly – household food insecurity has actually risen among the most vulnerable in society. Part of the answer is to grow a healthier, more diverse mix of food – currently 85pc of UK farmland is used to supply the meat processing industry. We need to use some of this land for vegetables, nuts, fruit, pulses, which can be grown, supplied and consumed locally, and typically require much less area. We also need to use more land to protect air quality, water quality, the environment, and nature with schemes like rewilding.

— Dominic Buscall, Project Manager

Wild Ken Hill is a lowland farm with some grassland, meadow, heathland and shrub. In the middle of the farm, arable farming and intensive grazing have been replaced with low density herbivores (Red Poll cattle, Tamworth pigs, Exmoor ponies). Woodland thinning encourages wood pasture. European beavers have been reintroduced within an enclosure.

The farm also manages freshwater marsh, river valleys and woodland in a traditional manner in the west of the farm. The eastern part of the farm is used for regenerative agriculture, where "we aim to repair soil health to sequester carbon and boost biodiversity, whilst also delivering good, sustainable yields with minimal use of chemical inputs."

== Media appearances ==
Wild Ken Hill was used for the filming of the BBC series Springwatch, Autumnwatch and Winterwatch in 2021–23.
