= Gillian Burke =

Natural history television programme presenter and producer, and voiceover artist

- Born: 1974 or 1975 (age 50–51); Kenya
- Education: University of Bristol
- Occupations: producer, TV presenter
- Years active: 2000–present
- Children: 2

Gillian Burke (born 1974 or 1975) is a natural history television programme presenter, producer and voiceover artist. She is best known for appearing as a co-presenter on the BBC nature series Springwatch and its spin-offs between 2017 and 2024.

== Career ==
Burke studied biology at the University of Bristol, and subsequently worked as a researcher for the BBC Natural History Unit. She worked as a producer and director on several series for Animal Planet and the Discovery Channel, and as a voiceover artist, before becoming a regular presenter on Springwatch in 2017. As part of her role, Burke also co-presented the seasonal spin-offs Autumnwatch and Winterwatch.

In 2019, she hosted Nature's Strangest Mysteries: Solved (Animal Planet), and in 2020 narrated Thailand's Wild Side (National Geographic Channel). In 2020, Burke became vice president of the Wildlife Trusts.

== Personal life ==
Burke's grandmothers are from the Seychelles, and her grandfathers are from Sri Lanka. She was born and grew up just outside of Nairobi, Kenya, where her father was a mechanic. At the age of ten the family relocated to Vienna, where she learnt to speak German. Her ancestry is Afro-Trinidadian, Seminole, Mauritian and Somalian; her mother was a journalist and worked with the United Nations. As a teenager, she developed an interest in wildlife through photography. She now lives in Cornwall with her two children. She has been an ambassador of the rainforest protection charity Cool Earth.
