= Hadrian (TV programme) =

- Genre: Documentary
- Directed by: John Trefor
- Presented by: Dan Snow
- Country of origin: United Kingdom
- Original language: English

Production
- Executive producer: Sam Organ
- Producer: John Trefor
- Running time: 60 minutes

Original release
- Network: BBC Two
- Release: 19 July 2008

Related
- Montezuma

Hadrian is a Bafta Cymru-winning 2008 BBC Television documentary film in which popular British historian Dan Snow follows the travels of the Roman Emperor Hadrian.

== Production ==
The film was produced by BBC Wales to tie in with the exhibition Hadrian: Empire and Conflict at the British Museum.

== Reception ==
=== Reviews ===
Sam Wollaston writing in The Guardian describes the film as, a breathless, whistle-stop tour of the Roman Empire, and complimented Snow for having, contagious bounding enthusiasm, a real passion for his subject, as well as the authority and gravitas to make you sit up and listen, but he is however critical of the cameraman's dizzying, habit of circling presenters, and the presenter's, prancing around in the desert, wearing a silk-scarf in the style of, The English Patient or Indiana Jones.

Andrew Billen writing in The Times described the film as a, really rather good account, but described Snow as, a bit too public school for my liking, a bit keen on showing us his biceps, and, a bit too Bear Grylls with his flowing desert scarf, concluding that he was unsure, whether to be pleased or sad that Hadrian died a long and lonely death.

=== Ratings ===
Broadcast 2008-07-19: 2.2 million viewers (11% audience share).

=== Awards ===
- 2009 Bafta Cymru for Best Presenter: Dan Snow (won).

== Synopsis ==
Hadrian; not only was he one of the greatest of the Roman Emperors, but I’ve always found him one of the most enigmatic and fascinating characters in the whole of ancient history. Now at the British Museum in London there’s a new exhibition which sheds light on some of the key moments of this remarkable man’s life. I’m going to try and get to the places where these remarkable objects came from; I want to learn about the Empire that Hadrian knew, travelled around and dominated more than any other Roman Emperor, I want to see the architecture that he commissioned, I want to see the places that inspired him, and above all I want to get to know Hadrian as a man.

— Dan Snow's opening narration

Snow begins his journey at Monte Testaccio a vivid indication of the importance of Hadrian's family olive oil business in Baetica. The Emperor Trajan was appointed guardian to the orphaned Hadrian who achieved his reputation leading the Emperor's wars of Imperial expansion. Snow visits Trajan's Markets where Hadrian asserted his authority to rule following the death of his guardian. Reversing the expansionist policies of his predecessor Hadrian defined the Empire's northern borders with a wall along the Danube-Rhine frontier and Hadrian's Wall, visited by Snow, in Northern England. Snow also visits the wall that defined the southern borders and the nearby city of Sbeitla in Tunisia which shows the prosperity this brought to the region.

Snow sees Hadrian's commitments to the cities of the Empire in the monumental constructions of Cyrene in Libya and Sagalassos in Greece built to enforce Roman cultural domination. Hadrian found solace is his close companionship with Antinous and his spiritual heartland of Athens, where he was initiated into the Eleusinian Mysteries and built the Temple of Olympian Zeus visited by Snow, in Greece. Snow visits the remote Mons Claudianus in Egypt where Hadrian quarried the great granite columns for his most impressive monument the Pantheon. Hadrian decrees the construction of Aelia Capitolina on the ruins of Jerusalem exiling the resident Jews.

Snow follows Hadrian's tour of Egypt to the Great Pyramid at Giza and the Valley of the Kings where following the drowning of his beloved Antinous in the Nile the Emperor founded the city of Antinoöpolis and deified the young boy. Hadrian's repressive policies in Judea resulted in the Bar Kokhba Revolt which the Emperor had Julius Severus quash by besieging the guerrillas' mountain base, visited by Snow, in Israel. Snow visits the massive Villa Adriana at Tivoli where the isolated and paranoid Hadrian spent his final years on personal building projects. Hadrian constructed his own monumental mausoleum Castel Sant' Angelo, visited by Snow, where he was finally interred after rebuilding the Empire and ensuring its stability.
