= MyDaughter =

British parenting website

MyDaughters
- Available in: English
- Owner: Girls' Schools Association
- Website: http://www.mydaughter.co.uk/
- Registration: Optional
- Launched: January 2009
- Current status: Closed in 2014

MyDaughter was a British website set up by the Girls' Schools Association (GSA) offering advice to parents of daughters on all aspects of raising and educating girls. Advice was provided by headteachers from the member schools of the Girls' Schools Association and other specialists in fields such as nutrition, psychology, health education and business.

== History ==
MyDaughter.co.uk was launched in January 2009 following a survey of a thousand parents of daughters, which highlighted a range of topics that were a cause of anxiety to parents. The research revealed that parents wanted help and advice on how to deal with these issues. This led the Girls' Schools Association to develop the MyDaughter brand as a source of online advice for parents. The Girls' Schools Association was approached by the Friday Project, an imprint of Harper Collins who were to publish "Your Daughter", a book of the site, in January 2011.

The website closed in 2014 with its functionality integrated into the GSA website.

== Content ==
MyDaughter.co.uk contained articles and responses to questions on education choices, realising girls' full academic potential, dealing with eating disorders and signs of bullying, development stages, family relationships, sexual relationships, social pressures and addictions, social networking sites and internet safety and communicating with teenage girls. Registered site users could post a question to be answered by a panel of experts.

The site featured notable alumnae from GSA schools including Claudia Winkleman, Claire Young and Miranda Krestovnikoff. It offered a search facility for girls' schools featuring all GSA schools.
