= Paul Barnett =

Paul Barnett may refer to:

- Paul Barnett (bishop) (born 1935), ancient historian, New Testament scholar and former Anglican bishop
- Paul Barnett (producer) (born 1968), television producer and director
- Paul Barnett (swimmer) (born 1980), Australian Paralympic swimmer
- Paul Barnett (video game designer) (born 1970), English game designer
- John Grant (author) (Paul le Page Barnett, 1949–2020), Scottish science fiction and comics writer, also known as Paul Barnett
