= James Wong (ethnobotanist) =

British ethnobotanist, garden designer and television presenter

- Born: 26 May 1981 (age 44); Smithfield, London, England
- Occupation(s): Ethnobotanist, television presenter, garden designer

James Alexander L. S. Wong (born 26 May 1981) is a British ethnobotanist, television presenter and garden designer. He is best known for presenting the award-winning series Grow Your Own Drugs and the BBC and PBS series Secrets of Your Food, as well as being a panelist on the Radio 4 series Gardeners' Question Time.

== Early life ==
Born at St Bartholomew's Hospital in the City of London to a Bornean father and a Welsh mother from Newport, Wong was brought up in Singapore and Malaysia. Upon being awarded an academic scholarship, he returned to the UK in 1999 to study at the University of Bath, where he took a BSc in Business Administration. He then trained at the Royal Botanic Gardens, Kew, and the University of Kent, gaining a Master of Science degree in ethnobotany, graduating with distinction.

== Career ==
At the age of 27, Wong became the presenter of his own television series Grow Your Own Drugs. The award-winning BBC Two series demonstrates a number of natural remedies sourced from plants, and soon became the highest-rated gardening series on UK television. The show ran for two series, as well as a one-off Christmas special, Grow Your Own Christmas. Wong's first two books that tied-in with each series of the television show became international best-sellers, with his third title Homegrown Revolution becoming the fastest selling gardening book in UK history.

Wong is also a regular reporter on the hit BBC One rural affairs series Countryfile since its reformatting in April 2009, as well as being a regular panellist on BBC Radio 4's Gardeners' Question Time, and presenter of the Channel NewsAsia series Expensive Eats.

In his capacity as a garden designer, he has become a four-time Royal Horticultural Society medal winner for gardens he co-designed through the design studio he co-founded, Amphibian Designs, at the Chelsea Flower Show and the Hampton Court Palace Flower Show. In his first garden at the 2004 Hampton Court Palace Flower Show, he became the youngest-ever medal-winning designer at the event, and is currently the youngest five-time RHS medal winner.

Wong has designed an Ethnobotanical Garden for the University of Kent, where he is a guest lecturer.

His research has taken him to highland Ecuador, as well as to China and Java.

In 2013 and 2014, he presented several episodes of Great British Garden Revival, winning Best Television Programme of the Year at the 2014 Garden Media Awards.

In September 2015, Wong started writing a weekly column in The Observer; in February 2023 he announced that he had resigned from the column, after writing to the editorial department and tweeting to describe as "completely unacceptable" a column by Catherine Bennett whose headline likened politicians who support trans rights to alleged sex trafficker Andrew Tate in the context of the Gender Recognition Reform (Scotland) Bill and which mentioned Rosie Duffield, Joanna Cherry and Miriam Cates by name, criticising comments by Lloyd Russell-Moyle and Ben Bradshaw.

== Personal life ==
Wong lives in central London. Wong retains a slight southern Welsh accent from his mother.

== Filmography ==
Year	Title	Role	Episodes
2008	Fossil Detectives	Co-presenter	
2008	Gardeners' World	Guest presenter	
2009–2013	Grow Your Own Drugs	Presenter	2 series plus a Christmas special
2009–2015	Countryfile	Co-presenter	
2010	James Wong and the Malaysian Garden	Presenter	
2011	The Fabulous Mrs Beeton	Co-Presenter	
2012	Our Food	Co-presenter	
2012	The People's Rainforest	Co-Presenter	
2013	Expensive Eats	Co-presenter	
2014–2015	Great British Garden Revival	Co-presenter	
2015	BBC Chelsea Flower Show Coverage	Co-presenter	
2017	The Secrets of Your Food	Co-presenter	
2017	Springwatch	Co-presenter	"Springwatch in Japan: Cherry Blossom Time"
2019	Heston's Marvellous Menu: Back to the Noughties	Guest	
2021	Nature and Us: A History through Art	Co-presenter	

== Bibliography ==
- Wong, James (2009). Grow Your Own Drugs. HarperCollins.
- Wong, James (2010). Grow Your Own Drugs – A Year with James Wong. HarperCollins.
- Wong, James (2012). James Wong's Homegrown Revolution. Weidenfeld & Nicolson.
- Wong, James (2015). Grow For Flavour. Octopus Publishing Group.
- Wong, James (2017). How to Eat Better. Octopus Publishing Group.
- Wong, James (2019). 10-a-day the easy way. Octopus Publishing Group.
