= Shanga, Pate Island =

Archaeological site in Kenya

Shanga is an archaeological site located in Pate Island off the eastern coast of Africa. The site covers about 15 hectares (37 acres). Shanga was excavated during an eight-year period in which archaeologists examined Swahili origins. The archaeological evidence in the form of coins, pottery, glass and beads all suggest that a Swahili community inhabited the area during the eighth century. Evidence from the findings also indicates that the site was a Muslim trading community that had networks in Asia.

== Location ==
Shanga is located on Pate Island—part of the Lamu Archipelago in the Indian Ocean. It is near the northern coast of Kenya. Coordinates: 41.04 E 2.08 S.

== Topography ==
Pate Island was formed as a result of fossilized coral reefs. Shanga itself is located on the southern part of the island that faces the Indian Ocean. The island is bordered by mangroves on land and by coral reefs on the shore. Mangroves tend to grow along the shore because they require the salt. Overall, the island has poor soil and a relatively flat surface which is covered in white sand. The sand often creates dunes that can reach up to about 10 metres (33 ft) in height. Coconut plantations can be found in abundance in the sandy regions. Horton notes that the only soil suitable for growing crops like sorghum, is the red soil located towards the center of the island. Drinking water was accessed by digging wells into the large sand dunes.

== History ==
Based on archaeological evidence, it is known that Shanga was first inhabited by the Swahili in the eighth century. According to Captain Chauncey Hugh Stigand and his version of the Pate Chronicles, the history of Shanga began with the arrival of Sulaiman ibn Sulaiman ibn Muzaffar al-Nabhan in 600 AD. It is stated that Sulaiman married the daughter of the king of Pate, thus giving him authority to rule over part of the island. Shanga was an independent town at the time of this event, so it did not fall under Sulaiman's jurisdiction. It was Sulaiman's royal descendants, however, that were eventually responsible for conquering Shanga later on.

The Swahili community in Shanga continued to thrive there for 600 years until their disappearance in the early fifteenth century. Oral traditions claim that the site was deserted circa 1400–1425. Shanga remained abandoned and unnoticed until the early twentieth century. Horton mentions that it was Captain Chauncey Stigand who noticed Shanga's ruins on Pate Island. Stigand, however never made an attempt to look more into them. The first archaeological study in Shanga would not take place until the 1950s with the arrival of Dr. James Kirkman. According to Horton, the Washanga (people of Shanga) still remain, although they now live in Siyu, a neighboring Swahili town. It is unclear as to why Shanga was abandoned in the early fifteenth century. Horton speculates that the community could have deserted the area for political reasons although it was more than likely due to a decline in water supply.

== Research ==
Shanga was first excavated by archaeologist Dr. James Kirkman in the 1950s. Soon after, the British Institute in Eastern Africa cleared part of Shanga in 1965. The areas that were cleared out included the Western Mosque and the wells near the Friday Mosque. In the 1970s, the site was visited by Dr. Richard Wilding, who discovered three coins. Dr. T. Wilson from the National Museums of Kenya extracted pottery samples and wrote a report on the fabrics found in Shanga in 1978. By 1980, most of the research conducted on the site was mainly devoted to mapping the area. The site was excavated by Mark Horton between 1985 and 1988.

== Stratigraphy and dating ==
Between the years 1980 and 1988, a total of ten trenches were excavated at the site.

Excavation procedures involved the definition of contexts (or layers), and their removal in reverse stratigraphic order. Finds were allocated the context number from which they came, while special finds were also given an individual recorded find number. Structures (abbreviation ‘str’) were defined and numbered in a single number series for the site, as were stone tombs (abbreviation ‘T’).

— Mark Horton, Shanga: The Archaeology of a Muslim Trading Community on the Coast of East Africa

Phases were also used in the excavation process.

These were associated groups of contexts which were broadly defined as the visible surfaces and buildings at a hypothetical span of time. In any trench there were between ten and twenty such phases, between topsoil and natural sand. For a site occupied for six hundred years, each phase represents about thirty years of occupation- approximately the life of a mud-and-thatch house on the coast now. Each phase contributed about 120 mm of deposit, largely made up by the debris of collapsed walls and midden deposits.

— Mark Horton, Shanga: The Archaeology of a Muslim Trading Community on the Coast of East Africa

In order to create a chronological framework, as well as measure the depth of deposit in the site, several test pits were dug around the north–south and east–west axes. There were thirty-three test pits in total, each one about one-meter square. The test pits gave archeologists an understanding of Shanga's development and patterns of occupation. Results from the test pits indicate that there was a concentration of occupation towards the center of the site in between two dune ranges. It is believed that the center of occupation was determined by the availability of water resources. The community that occupied Shanga in the past settled in the areas that showed promising water supply.

== Dating ==
Absolute dating in Shanga was achieved through radiocarbon testing and imported pottery. Both methods of dating present dates ranging from the eighth to fifteenth century. A total of thirteen radiocarbon dates have been processed in the site. The radiocarbon dates demonstrate that Shanga was occupied sometime between the eighth and fifteenth centuries. Horton points out that Shanga pottery dating has been extensively examined by archaeologists Neville Chittick, James Kirkman and Richard Wilding.

== Findings ==
There were several discoveries made at Shanga. Among these discoveries are the excavation of the stone town, stone tombs, human remains, the excavation of the Eastern, Western and Friday Mosques, Muslim coinage, pottery, glass, and beads.

== Stone town ==
=== Building materials ===
Horton explains that the stone town of Shanga was built using primarily two types of coral: Porites solida and coral rag. Porites solida is fairly malleable and can easily be shaped into blocks for wall structures. (26). The practice of shaping coral into blocks occurred approximately between 900 and 1100. Coral rag, a lot more dense is not as easily shaped as Porites solida. Yet despite being a bit more difficult to manage, coral rag was more durable and cheaper to acquire. Coral rag was only used as boundary walls at first, but then eventually became a common building material from 1100 onwards. The coral blocks were set in place with mud or a lime mixture that would serve as mortar. The coral surfaces were often smoothed down with a plaster made from the same limethat was used for mortar.

=== Town layout ===
The stone town of Shanga consists of 185 houses that date from the 1300s to the 1400s. In addition to these buildings, there are also piles of stone rubble that suggest that about another 35 homes once existed alongside the 185 structures that still stand today. The stone houses are described by Horton as being "densely packed in the southern part of the settlement.” This left little room for open spaces. Between the homes, there are narrow spaces that reveal remnants of streets that run perpendicularly. Horton notes that there are no diagonal streets found on the site.

=== Architecture ===
The stone houses of the town all share a similar layout.

All the surviving stone houses at Shanga are of a single storey with walls of coral rag and lime between 0.38 m and 0.45 m thick. Walls lie in a shallow foundation trench never deeper than 0.4 m.

— Mark Horton, Shanga: The Archaeology of a Muslim Trading Community on the Coast of East Africa

Horton also mentions an interesting point that describes how the walls were first smoothed out before adding the next layer of masonry. Horton points out that this practice is an architectural technique found with mud-brick building in the Near East. The rooms of each house were of similar heights ranging from 2.5 m to 3.5 m. The floors inside the houses were made of a lime plaster over coral. The doorways came in two styles: flat-topped or pointed. All of the houses were built with wall niches instead of windows. There are also peg holes found in various rooms in each stone house. Horton speculates that the purpose of these peg holes might have been to "support or display cloth hung on the walls."

=== Tombs ===
The sheer number of tombs found at Shanga is far greater in comparison to any other site along the East African coast. According to Horton, there are roughly around five hundred stone tombs scattered throughout the site. He speculates that there might be about seventy more tombs hidden underneath the sands. The tombs are mainly found grouped together in one of the three following main areas including: the external cemetery, the Friday Mosque, and in the outskirts of the stone town. The greatest concentration of tombs can be found in the external cemetery. The stone tombs are made up of the same materials used to build the stone houses. The tombs contain both coral rag and lime. Several of these stone tombs include inscriptions written in Arabic. Each stone tomb is unique in its way and comes in a wide range of styles which are classified as 'types.' The types of stone tombs found at Shanga include: rubble, rectangular platform, headstone with platform, enclosure with headstone, platform with head insets, small enclosure, large enclosure, complex, and pillar.

== The Friday Mosque ==
The Friday Mosque is the oldest of the three mosques found in Shanga. Horton claims that the Friday Mosque dates back to the eleventh century. The other two mosques: the Eastern Mosque and the Western Mosque were not built until the late thirteenth to fourteenth century. The fact that the mosques exist on the site "is the basis for the claim of a significantly early Islamic presence in Shanga." Horton states that the Friday Mosque underwent several reconstructions and expansions during its time before it was destroyed and abandoned in the fifteenth century.

The Friday Mosque found today is in a state of ruin. Yet the current remains have contributed a great deal in understanding the overall layout of the mosque. The main room of the mosque (musala) has a rectangular layout with a plaster floor. Unlike the houses from the stone town, the mosques had windows at one point. The Friday mosque also has remnants of a minbar, whose dimensions are roughly around 3.3 x 1.1 m. Outside of the mosque there are courtyards on both East and West ends. The Western courtyard was different from the Eastern courtyard due to the fact that it contained a well. It is believed that the Western courtyard was used as a washing area. Horton also mentions that near the well there is a large triangular space that once served as two rooms. The purpose of these rooms is still unknown.

Excavations at the Friday Mosque reveal a series of seventeen phases underneath. The mosque itself was built over several older structures made of timber and stone. According to radiocarbon testing the first mosque built on the site dates back to the eighth century. The first mosque would then undergo a series of reconstructions in the next 200 years which eventually led to the construction of the Friday Mosque. The earliest radiocarbon date extracted from the mosque belongs to a burnt tree stump, which dates back to 703-848 cal AD. The latest radiocarbon date ranges from 1002 to 1106 AD, and it was obtained from a carbon layer below the floor of the mosque.

== Pottery ==
More than 200,000 sherds of pottery were recovered from stratified contexts from the four main excavations.

— Mark Horton, Shanga: The Archaeology of a Muslim Trading Community on the Coast of East Africa

The pottery sherds found in Shanga can be divided into two types of pottery: manufactured pottery and imported pottery.

=== Manufactured pottery ===
The manufactured pottery or 'local pottery' of Shanga was made using an "ill-sorted alluvial clay and occasionally a coral or shell temper." The various local pottery sherds discovered in Shanga range in differing styles. The distinct styles of pottery promote the idea of a sequence of transition in which one can trace the shifting forms of pottery-making and decorating. Horton divides this pottery sequence into four phases: A. early Tana tradition, B. mature Tana tradition, C. late Tana tradition, and D. final Tana tradition. Phase A is characterized by the distinct incised lines and punctures that decorate the surface. Phase B is known for its thinner sherds as well as the use of wavy lines for decoration. Phase C pottery is redder in color yet has what Horton describes as "a limited decoration style that only extends a short distance." Phase D is reminiscent to Phase C; however, there are a lot more red sherds and the decoration is very basic at best.

=== Imported pottery ===
Evidence of imported pottery also appears in Shanga. Based on the styles from the pottery remnants, it is known that pottery was imported from the Arabian Peninsula, the Indian sub-continent, and the Far East. Other that the distinct shapes, the main difference between imported pottery and local pottery was the way in which they were decorated local pottery was not glazed, therefore the imported glazed pottery was highly valued. Yet not all imported pottery was glazed, some were instead decorated with fabrics.

== Coins ==
According to Helen Brown, a total of 64 coins were discovered in the years 1983, 1986, 1987, and 1988. Horton mentions that three of the coins were found by Dr. Richard Wilding in 1977. The bit of writing that is legible on most of the coins displays Arabic script. The coins highlight the strong ties Shanga held with the Islamic world despite the fact that the coins themselves were never used in any other known Islamic community outside of Shanga. Horton mentions that most of the coins are made of silver rather than bronze. The coins found in Shanga have different dates that can range anywhere from 800 to 1100. The coins themselves support the idea of commerce in Shanga.

== See also ==
- Historic Swahili Settlements
- Swahili architecture
