= Anjana Khatwa =

English earth scientist, presenter and writer

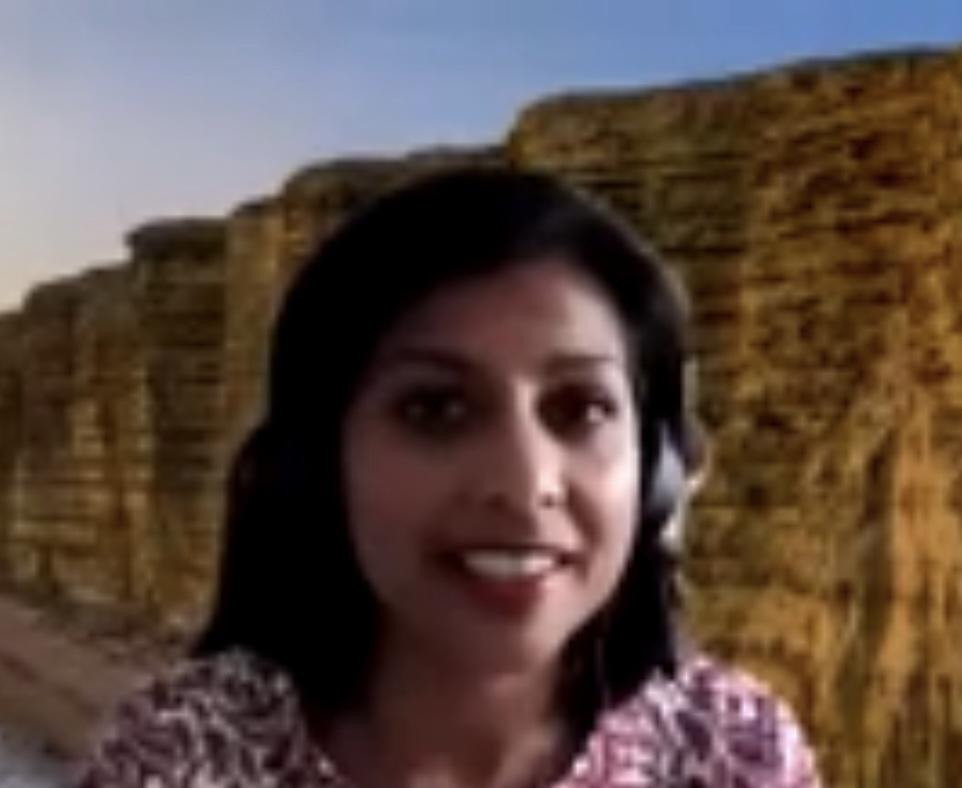
- Khatwa in 2021
- Born: 5 May 1975 (age 51); Slough, England
- Other names: Anjana Ford; Anjana Khatwa Ford
- Education: Kingston University; University of Southampton
- Children: 3
- Website: www.anjanakhatwa.com

Anjana Khatwa (5 May 1975) is an English earth scientist, presenter and writer. She is known for her work on the Jurassic Coast and has received a number of accolades, including the Geological Society of London's RH Worth Medal and the Geologists' Association's Halstead Medal. Her debut book The Whispers of Rock was published in 2025.

== Early life ==
Khatwa was born in Slough to Kenyan parents of Indian Rajasthani origin. Khatwa graduated with a Bachelor of Science (BSc) in Geology and Earth Science from Kingston University in 1996 and completed a PhD at the University of Southampton in 1999.

== Career ==
After completing her PhD, Khatwa took up postdoctoral research fellowships at the University of California, Santa Cruz, the University of Sheffield, and the University of Utah. A year interning at a U.S. national park inspired Khatwa to go into "public engagement and education" back in England.

Khatwa was hired by Dorset County Council to work on the Jurassic Coast World Heritage Site Team in 2004. She made her television presenting debut in the 2008 BBC Two docuseries Fossil Detectives. She also contributed to Men of Stone on BBC Radio 4 and Nature Calendar, also on BBC Two. In 2010, Khatwa co-created the film Coastal Conflicts, which won the Geographical Association's Publishers' Award. Khatwa's Jurassic Coast World Heritage Team won the Royal Geographical Society's 2016 Geographical Award. Khatwa then moved to the county council's Jurassic Coast Trust in 2016, where she remained until 2019. In 2018, she appeared as the resident geology expert on the BBC Four programme Beach Live.

Supported by the National Lottery Heritage Fund, in 2020, Khatwa joined the Wessex Museums Trust as engagement lead, overseeing Dorset Museum, Poole Museum, The Salisbury Museum, and Wiltshire Museum. Khatwa was awarded the 2021 RH Worth Medal by the Geological Society of London. In addition, she received the Positive Role Model Award at the National Diversity Awards and the Annual Award for Excellence from the Geographical Association (GA).

In 2022, Khatwa joined the Open University. Khatwa was awarded the 2023 Halstead Medal by the Geologists' Association. Having been longlisted for the 2021 Nan Shepherd Prize, the Bridge Street Press (a Hachette UK imprint) acquired the rights to publish Khatwa's debut book The Whispers of Rock in September 2025.

== Personal life ==
Khatwa lives in Corfe Mullen, Dorset with her partner and their three children.

== Bibliography ==
=== Books ===
- The Whispers of Rock (2025)

=== Essays ===
- "Provenance" in The Clearing (2022)
