= Andy Torbet =

British adventurer and TV presenter

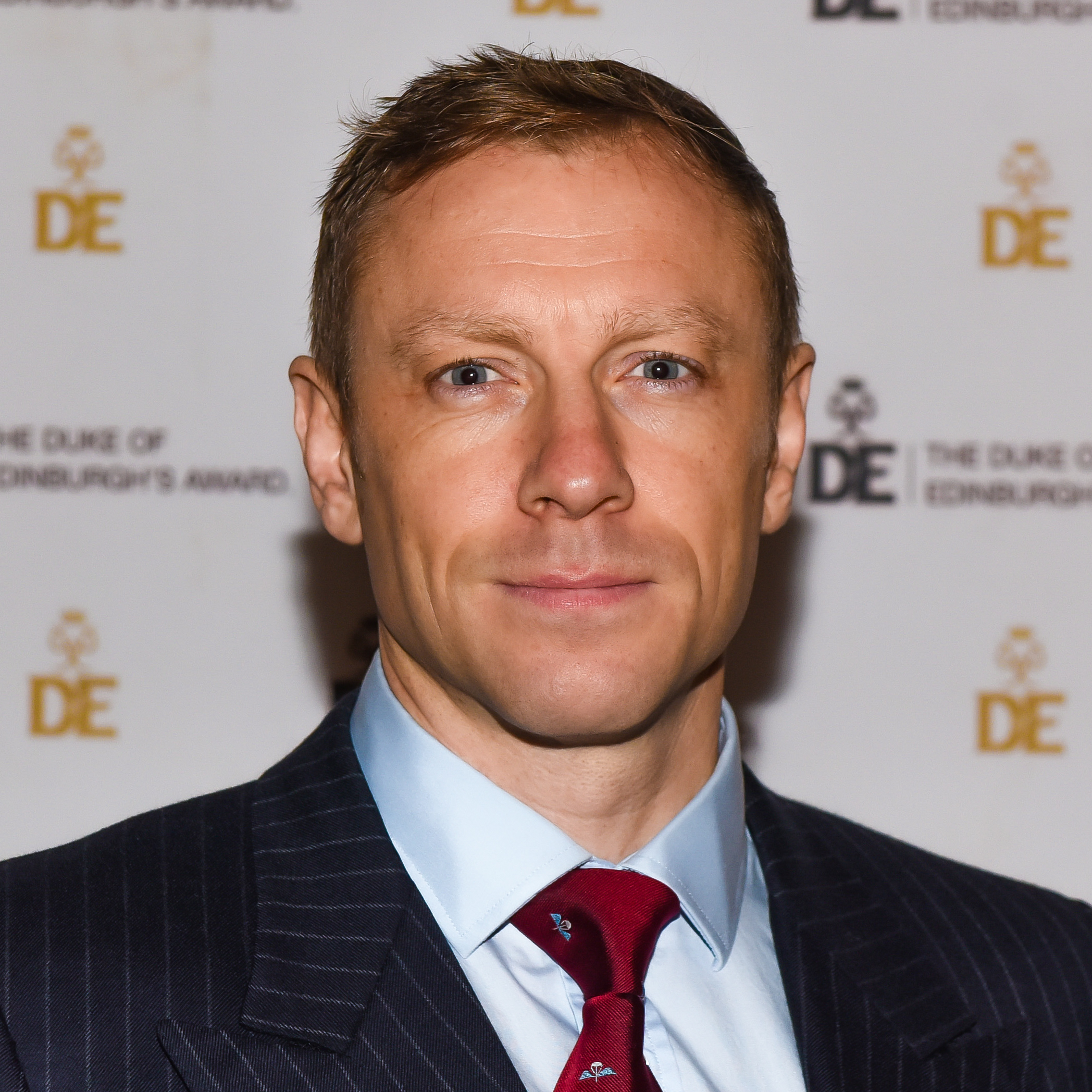
- Born: 11 June 1976 (age 50); Irvine, Scotland
- Occupations: Adventurer, tv presenter, author
- Known for: Underwater exploring, The One Show, Operation Iceberg, The People Remember.

Andy Torbet (born 11 June 1976) is a Scottish underwater explorer, professional cave diver, skydiver, freediver and climber, Film Maker and TV Presenter; most notably the BBC's The One Show, Coast, Operation Iceberg, Operation Cloud Lab, Britain's Ancient Capital, The People Remember, and the Children's BBC series Beyond Bionic which he also co-Produced and spawned its own computer game called Beyond Bionic-Extreme Encounters.

His first book, Extreme Adventures, was published in 2015 by Bantam Press.

He became a host on the show Fully Charged in April 2020.

== Early years ==
Torbet was brought up in the Scottish Highlands in rural Aberdeenshire. His father was a forester on The Craigston Estate. He attended the University of Sheffield, where he studied Zoology.

== Army years ==
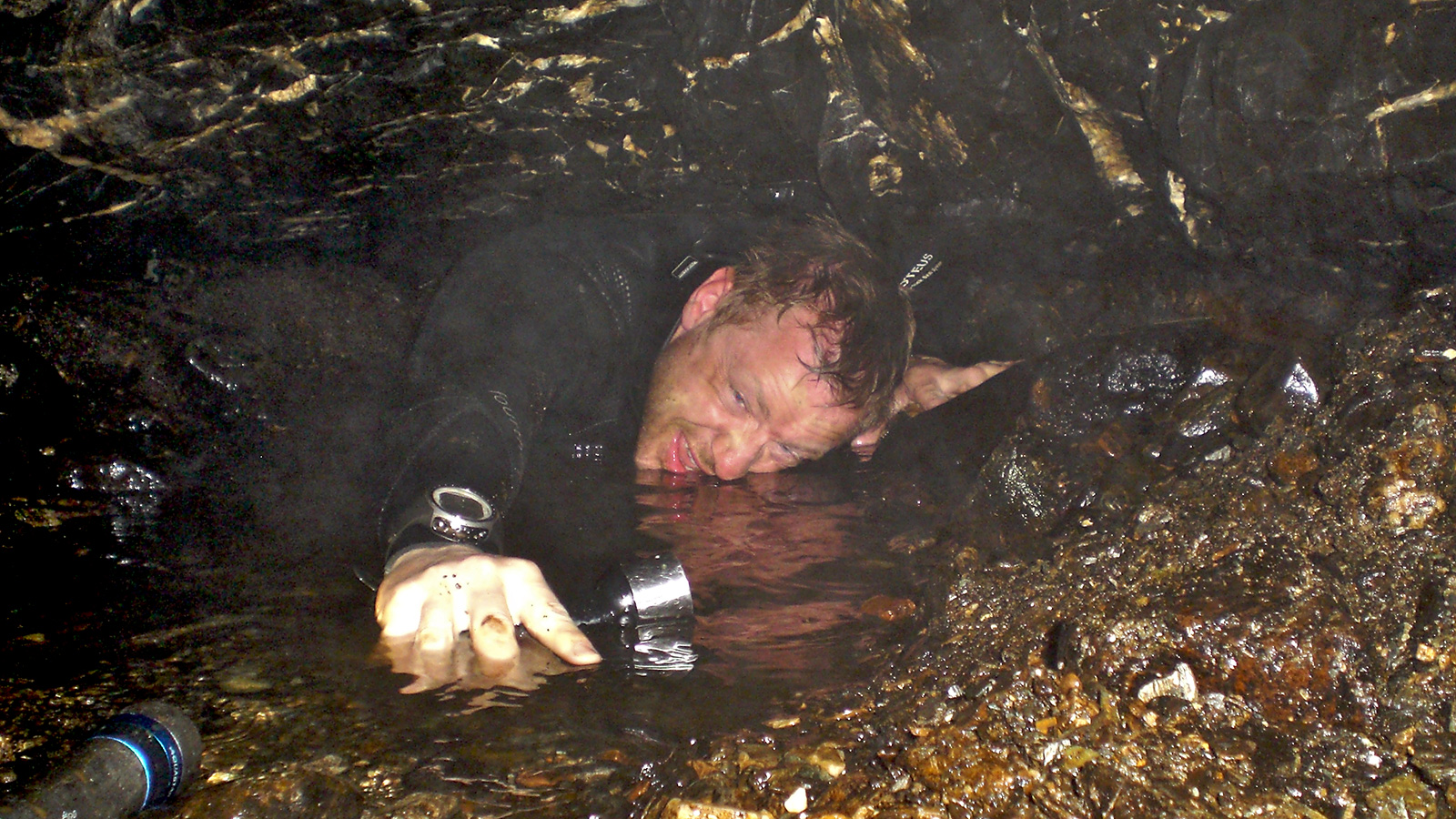
Andy Torbet potholing in the Cave of Skulls, Scotland

Torbet spent 10 years in the British Armed Forces as a Paratrooper, Army Diver, and bomb disposal officer, including serving with the 16 Air Assault Brigade, 3 Commando Brigade, the British Army's underwater bomb disposal team and the maritime counter terrorist group.

He was involved in military operations in Iraq, Afghanistan, Bosnia and Herzegovina, Kosovo, Northern Ireland and Falkland Islands.

== Diving ==
Torbet took up diving at the age of 12, he has since dived on operations in the British Armed Forces, on commercial vessels, and explored cave systems and ship wrecks for his television and publishing work.

He has a number of technical diving qualifications, including cave, mixed gas, rebreather and free-diving as well as professional qualifications as a military and commercial diver and supervisor.

Torbet's most notable dives include the Cave Of Skulls a pothole system in Meall nan Aighean, and Scotland's deepest pothole at 48 metres; exploring the wreck HMS Wager (1739) off the coast of Gulf of Penas, Patagonia; and the discovery in the English Channel of the MV Shoal Fisher, a wrecked World War II merchant ship.

== Climbing and skydiving ==
Torbet is a qualified mountaineering and climbing Instructor and member of the Association of Mountaineering Instructors, with new routes and first ascents in the UK, Canada and Pakistan. As well as rock climbing, he also ice climbs and was a presenter on the BBC's award-winning Operation Iceberg

Torbet is a professional skydiver; in 2016, on the BBC's The One Show, he raced a Peregrine falcon in flight while wearing a wingsuit, achieving a win with speeds in excess of 240 mph. He also performed a HAHO (High Altitude High Opening) jump for the BBC's Cloud Lab.

His highest jump to date, is 28,000 ft over the Arizona desert, in the United States

== Publications ==
- Andy, Torbet (2015). Extreme Adventures. Bantam Press. ISBN 978-0593071625.
