= Grow Your Own Drugs =

- Presented by: James Wong
- Country of origin: United Kingdom
- Original language: English
- No. of series: 2
- No. of episodes: 12

Production
- Running time: 6x30 mins, 1x60 mins
- Production company: Silver River Productions

Original release
- Network: BBC Two
- Release: 6 January 2009 – 27 April 2010

Grow Your Own Drugs is a British television documentary series, first broadcast on BBC Two, exploring the many remedies which can be provided by plants. James Wong, an ethnobotanist, presents the series and takes the view that people should start making their own remedies in order to save money and feel healthier plus providing simple remedies to everyday ailments. Wong tries out his remedies on members of the public in order to demonstrate the beneficial effects of natural remedies, adding appropriate safety warnings. He is careful to stress that viewers should always seek medical advice before trying natural medicines, and in discussing the outcomes of treatment always states "It's not a clinical trial..." and acknowledges that results might be attributed to a placebo effect.

Proving a huge ratings success for the BBC, the programme quickly became the highest rated gardening programme in the UK, producing an internationally best-selling book, by the same title, as a spin-off. In 2009, the series also won "Best Television Programme" at the UK Garden Media Guild Awards.

Wong's says:

I want to make people think differently about plants – growing all around us are plants that could make you feel better.

and:

Making your own natural remedies for minor complaints can be easy, cheap and fun. But you must know exactly what you’re using and how to use it. I’m not against conventional medicine and it’s really important you get yourself diagnosed by a doctor before trying natural remedies.

A special edition, Grow Your Own Drugs for Christmas, focusing mostly on the applications of plants associated with the season such as holly, ivy, mistletoe and pine, aired on 16 December 2009.

A second series began airing on 23 March 2010.

== Episodes ==
Season 1

Episode	Title
1	Fruit
2	Flowers
3	Trees
4	Herbs
5	Roots
6	Vegetables

Special

Episode	Title
–	Christmas

Season 2

Episode	Title
1	Garden Herbs
2	Incredible Edibles
3	Exotic Plants
4	Petals
5	Shrubs & Trees
6	Wild Plants
