= Coast (TV series) =

BBC documentary television series

- Also known as: Coast and Beyond (2009–2011); Our Coast (2019-); Coast Australia (2014–)
- Genre: Documentary
- Created by: BBC Birmingham
- Directed by: Jonathan Barker; Oliver Clark Paul Barnett; Nigel Walk
- Presented by: Nicholas Crane; Neil Oliver; Mehreen Baig; Adrian Chiles
- Starring: Mark Horton; Tessa Dunlop; Dick Strawbridge; Miranda Krestovnikoff; Andy Torbet; Ruth Goodman; Hermione Cockburn; Ian McMillan; Alice Roberts (2005–2011); Brendan Walker (2015–); Helen Arney (2015–); Cassie Newland (2015–)
- Composer: Alan Parker
- Country of origin: United Kingdom
- Original language: English
- No. of series: 10
- No. of episodes: 75

Production
- Executive producers: Gary Hunter; William Lyons; Gill Tierney; Emma De'ath
- Producer: Steve Evanson
- Cinematography: Julian Clinkard
- Editors: Mike Bloore; Lauri White; Martin Dowell
- Running time: 60 minutes (approx.)

Original release
- Network: BBC Two
- Release: 22 July 2005 – 13 August 2015

Related
- Fossil Detectives

Coast is a BBC documentary series first broadcast on BBC Two television in 2005. It covers various subjects relating to both the natural and social history of the British coastline and also more recently, that of Britain's near neighbours. The seventh series followed a different format from previous series. In 2016, reports from the show were repackaged as Coast: The Great Guide (known as Coast Great Guides when broadcast on BBC Four in 2021), an eight part series on BBC Two.

The series is a collaboration between the Open University and BBC Productions, Birmingham. It is also known as the placeholder programme when BBC2 is under a fault in programming.

In December 2013, the first reversion of the series format, Coast Australia, was screened on The History Channel in Australia. Hosted by Neil Oliver, it was the second highest-rated show in the history of the channel. It started airing on BBC Two from 14 May 2014; series 2 was aired in 2015. Coast New Zealand aired in 2016. A similar show, Arfordir Cymru (Wales Coast), is broadcast on the Welsh-language broadcaster S4C and hosted by Bedwyr Rees; three series have aired so far, each of six 23-minute-long episodes, travelling in Pembrokeshire (2014), the Llŷn Peninsula (2015), and Cardigan Bay (2017).

In 2020, BBC Studios produced a refresh of the original series called Our Coast, presented by Adrian Chiles and Mehreen Baig. The new series featured Dumfries and Galloway/South Ayrshire, County Down, Anglesey, and Liverpool.

== Presenters ==
The original presenters, and their fields of interest, are:

- Nicholas Crane (lead presenter, series 1, 6–) — geography
- Neil Oliver (lead presenter, series 2–5) — archaeology and social history
- Alice Roberts — anthropology and geology
- Mark Horton — marine archaeology
- Miranda Krestovnikoff — zoology

The original presenters have formed the backbone of the presenting team; however Alice Roberts left the Coast team after the end of the sixth series.

Several other presenters have also become regulars after originally appearing on a one-off basis:

- Dick Strawbridge (series 2–) — engineering
- Hermione Cockburn (series 2–) — general
- Tessa Dunlop (series 6–) — social history
- Adam Henson (series 6) — farming
- Andy Torbet (series 7–) — general
- Ruth Goodman (series 7–) — social history
- Ian McMillan (series 7–) — general

== Series overview ==
Series 1 started at the White Cliffs of Dover and progressed in a clockwise fashion around the coast of Great Britain (with a side trip to Northern Ireland). Series 2 again started at Dover but subsequent episodes did not follow series one in circumnavigating the UK coast, instead featuring various locations, including sections of the coast of the Republic of Ireland. Series 4 reintroduced the circular element, starting at Whitstable and ending at Hull, though with visits to Ireland, Normandy, and Norway included as well. The format of the seventh series abandoned the geographical element and instead each episode focused on a particular theme and featured locations from around the British Isles. All but one of the episodes in the first series ended with Nicholas Crane stating that in the British Isles, "Remember, you are never more than 72 miles from the sea!" Neil Oliver closed the fifth series with the same statement.

Series 4 onwards were simulcast on the BBC HD channel.

Extracts from the programme are often used as filler items on BBC Two, for example following a fifty-minute documentary programme such as Natural World or Horizon, to allow the next full programme to begin on the hour. As the aerial shots from the Coast programmes are made in high-definition, they are also used in this way on BBC HD.

Episodes from old series have been shown on Yesterday.

Series 5 was shown overseas (e.g. in New Zealand on the Living Channel) before being shown on the BBC.

=== DVD releases ===
Series 1 to 5 of Coast have been released on Region 2 DVD by Contender Home Entertainment, or, following their acquisition, by E1 Entertainment. Series 6 onwards have been released on Region 2 DVD and Region B Blu-ray by Acorn Media UK.

Series	Episodes	Originally Aired		DVD Release	Blu-ray Release	Discs	Runtime	Publisher
Series	Episodes	From	To	Region 2	Region B	Discs	Runtime	Publisher
1	12	22 July 2005	28 August 2005	24 October 2005		3	686 mins	Contender; Home Entertainment
2	8	26 October 2006	14 December 2006	27 November 2006		3	480 mins	Contender; Home Entertainment
3	8	3 June 2007	7 August 2007	16 July 2007		3	480 mins	Contender; Home Entertainment
4	8	14 July 2009	1 September 2009	24 August 2009		3	480 mins	E1; Entertainment
5	8	25 July 2010	1 September 2010	6 September 2010		3	480 mins	E1; Entertainment
6	6	5 June 2011	17 July 2011	18 July 2011	18 July 2011	2	360 mins	Acorn Media UK
7	6	13 May 2012	17 June 2012	18 June 2012	18 June 2012	2	360 mins	Acorn Media UK
8	6	3 April 2013	8 May 2013	20 May 2013		2	360 mins	Acorn Media UK
9	6	15 July 2014	19 August 2014					
10	6	9 July 2015	13 August 2015					

Numerous box sets have been released, including one which packaged Series 1 with another BBC documentary, A Picture of Britain.

Title	DVD Release	Discs	DVD Runtime	Publisher
Title	Region 2	Discs	DVD Runtime	Publisher
Coast: Series 1 & A Picture of Britain Box Set	27 March 2006	5	1080 mins	Contender; Home Entertainment
Coast: Series 1 & 2 Box Set	27 November 2006	6	1166 mins	Contender; Home Entertainment
Coast: Series 1, 2 & 3 Box Set	10 September 2007	9	1646 mins	Contender; Home Entertainment
Coast: Series 1, 2, 3 & 4 Box Set	24 August 2009	12	2126 mins	E1; Entertainment
Coast: Series 1, 2, 3, 4 & 5 Box Set	4 July 2011	15	2506 mins	E1; Entertainment

=== Series 1 (2005) ===
The first series of Coast was originally aired on BBC2 during the summer of 2005. The series follows a circumnavigation of the coastline, starting and finishing in Dover.

Lead presenter Nicholas Crane remarks on more than one occasion during the series that it was a "once-in-a-lifetime journey" suggesting that Coast was originally planned as a one-off series, although subsequent series did not follow the same "journey round the coast of Britain" approach, but concentrated on stories from various areas, including overseas. Series 1 is the only series yet to include more than eight episodes. A review episode was shown on 2 September 2005, looking back over the series' highlights, and looking at the future of the coastline – this is not included in the DVD release for the series.

Series no.	No. in series	Title	Directed by	Written by	UK Ratings (BBC2 Rank)	Original release date
1	1	"Dover to Exmouth"	Oliver Clark	David Stafford	3.97m (4)	22 July 2005
Dover's iconic chalk cliffs are the dramatic starting point for this epic exploration of Britain's 11,700 miles of coastline. Nicholas Crane investigates Martello towers – man-made defences on the south coast – and finds out how the "sound mirrors" built to warn of approaching enemy aircraft worked; Mark Horton reveals why Portsmouth became home to the Royal Navy; and Neil Oliver learns of a Nazi concentration camp in the Channel Islands.
1	2	"Exmouth to Bristol"	Jonathon Barker	David Stafford	5.18m (1)	24 July 2005
The South West of England bears the brunt of our worst storms, as Alice Roberts discovers when she investigates how human greed led to the village of Hallsands being washed into the sea. Meanwhile, Nicholas Crane unearths the little-known history of the slave trade in Plymouth, Mark Horton probes the origins of the Royal Mail, and Miranda Krestovnikoff comes face to face with the UK's only native shark: the porbeagle.
1	3	"Bristol to Cardigan Bay"	John Trefor	David Stafford	3.98m (3)	29 July 2005
For thousands of years, the world's second greatest tidal range has had a huge impact on the inhabitants of the South Wales coast. Neil Oliver uncovers real-life horror at the Smalls Lighthouse, Mark Horton explores the terrifying power of sand, Alice Roberts seeks out our Ice Age ancestor and Miranda Krestovnikoff reveals the secrets of rockpools. Plus a chance to witness a dramatic natural spectacle: the Severn Bore.
1	4	"Cardigan Bay to the Dee"	John Trefor	David Stafford	5.02m (1)	31 July 2005
Nicholas Crane journeys from Cardigan Bay in Ceredigion to the English/Welsh border via the seaside resort of Llandudno. Along the way he hears the heroic story of how two bridges were built across the treacherous Menai Strait. Meanwhile, anthropologist Alice Roberts explores the biggest prehistoric copper mine in the world, historian Neil Oliver unearths a Welsh Atlantis, and zoologist Miranda Krestovnikoff goes in search of the elusive leatherback turtles.
1	5	"Liverpool to the Solway Firth"	Nigel Walk	David Stafford	3.95m (3)	5 August 2005
Nicholas Crane visits Lytham St Anne's, site of the worst lifeboat disaster in British history, while Alice Roberts relates the discovery of 5,000-year-old human footprints on a beach near Liverpool. Neil Oliver experiences the dangerous quicksands of Morecambe Bay and Mark Horton takes a look at the coastal defences at the end of Hadrian's Wall, once the outer edge of the Roman empire.
1	6	"The Northern Ireland Coast"	Roger Ford-Hutchinson	David Stafford	4.09m (2)	7 August 2005
Beautiful but troubled, Northern Ireland's coast has had a turbulent history for more than 2,000 years. Nicholas Crane et al take in the history as they cycle Antrim's scenic Coast Road, dive Strangford Lough – the largest sea lough on the island Ireland, home to 2,000 marine species – and, in a visit to one of the country's most popular tourist attractions, step across the Giant's Causeway.
1	7	"The West Coast of Scotland and Western Isles"	Jane McWilliams	David Stafford	4.25m (1)	12 August 2005
Nicholas Crane begins his exploration of Scotland's west coast aboard the yacht Crunneaig, Alice Roberts joins the launch of a warship and Neil Oliver goes below the waves on a submarine. Meanwhile, Mark Horton feels the force of a noted whirlpool and Miranda Krestovnikoff searches for the elusive minke whale. Later, Neil Oliver and Mark Horton have a go at re-creating a novel interpretation of "air mail" between the islands of Scarp and Harris.
1	8	"Cape Wrath to Orkney"	Paul Overton	David Stafford	4.12m (2)	14 August 2005
Beginning his journey at the most north-westerly point of the British mainland — Cape Wrath — Nicholas Crane finds this uninhabited wilderness a hub of military activity. He also experiences the full impact of the region's storms as a Stornoway coastguard. Alice Roberts visits the site of the Dounreay nuclear power station, and local people explain how the impact of the Highland Clearances can still be felt even today.
1	9	"John o' Groats to Berwick"	Paul Overton	David Stafford	4.14m (2)	19 August 2005
Nicholas Crane begins his journey at John o' Groats, the village farthest from Land's End. At Cruden Bay he sees the impact made years ago by the discovery of North Sea oil. Meanwhile, Miranda Krestovnikoff observes bottlenose dolphins in the Moray Firth, Neil Oliver meets two generations of a fishing family to learn of their hopes and fears for the industry, and Alice Roberts finds out about life on board a whaling ship.
1	10	"Berwick to Robin Hood's Bay"	Oliver Clark	David Stafford	4.43m (1)	21 August 2005
Nicholas Crane unearths Berwick-upon-Tweed's violent past and Mark Horton explores Bamburgh Castle, once the royal seat of the Kingdom of Northumbria. Alice Roberts joins a project to rebuild a Stone Age settlement and Miranda Krestovnikoff visits a thriving colony of grey seals. Plus a trip to Lindisfarne and, as this leg of the journey comes to an end in Whitby, the team reveal how Bram Stoker was inspired to write Dracula there.
1	11	"Robin Hood's Bay to the Wash"	Jonathan Barker	David Stafford	4.91m (1)	26 August 2005
Alice Roberts visits Ravenscar to watch chemists re-create the alum crystals once produced in the area. Neil Oliver looks back on Scarborough's long-standing popularity as a seaside resort, then pays a visit to the first Butlins resort at Skegness. Meanwhile, Mark Horton takes to the water in a replica of a Bronze Age boat, Nicholas Crane recalls the advent of the fish finger, and Miranda Krestovnikoff finds out more about the Wash.
1	12	"The Wash to Dover"	Nigel Walk	David Stafford	3.92m (2)	28 August 2005
In East Anglia, Alice Roberts finds evidence of Britain's Ice Age landbridge to Europe, Nicholas Crane meets a modern-day King Canute fighting to prevent his home from falling into the sea and Neil Oliver uncovers an eyewitness account from the heart of the Battle of Trafalgar. Mark Horton, meanwhile, chats to an architectural historian about the colourful beach huts which are a popular aspect of the British coastline.
1	13	"The Future Coast"	Unknown	Unknown	3.97m (1)	2 September 2005
A chance to see some of the best bits of the series, plus a look to the future to see how Britain's coastline might alter. What will be the effects of climate change, and could the coast become the country's powerhouse, with wind turbines dominating the skyline? What measures are we taking to protect the creatures that live in our waters? And just how much of our coastline is actually open to the public? NB. This episode is not included in the DVD release for the series.

=== Series 2 (2006) ===
The second series of Coast was originally aired on BBC2 during the autumn of 2006. Whilst the series starts in Dover and finishes in nearby Margate, it does not follow the same circular journey of the previous series. It is the first series to feature a foreign shoreline, that of the Republic of Ireland.

The subtitle of the series is The Journey Continues.

Series no.	No. in series	Title	Directed by	UK Ratings (BBC2 Rank)	Original release date
2	1	"Dover to the Isle of Wight"	Oliver Clark	4.17m (2)	26 October 2006
Historian Neil Oliver investigates the Victorian channel tunnel, anthropologist Alice Roberts heads for the Isle of Wight's forgotten space rocket testing site, and geographer Nicholas Crane dangles from Beachy Head to discover how the chalk coast was formed – and why it's disappearing. Mark Horton probes Southampton's claim to be the oldest active port, while Miranda Krestovnikoff explores the flora and fauna living on and around chalk ledges on the seabed.
2	2	"Holyhead to Liverpool"	John Trefor	3.45m (2)	2 November 2006
On the rugged north Wales coast, we meet one of the longest-living animals, learn how a shipwrecked child changed the way we practise medicine and reveal how pebbles make detectives of us all. Farther along, we find out how, in 1826, messages were sent from Holyhead to Liverpool in mere seconds. Meanwhile, Neil Oliver is fascinated by a strange cave on the cliffs of the Great Orme.
2	3	"Arran to Gretna"	Matt Barrett	3.98m (2)	9 November 2006
A trip along Scotland's south-west coast, from the jagged mountains of Arran to the English border at Gretna. The team visit the sand dunes where Alfred Nobel created the world's largest explosives factory. Plus the only place in the UK visited by Elvis Presley, the most southerly point in Scotland, the vast windswept mudflats of the Solway Firth — and the World Flounder Tramping Championships. Nicholas Crane also visits the granite island of Ailsa Craig.
2	4	"Cornwall and the Isles of Scilly"	Nicky Taylor	4.18m (1)	16 November 2006
Cables beneath a Cornish beach lead to a dramatic tale of the birth of radio, espionage, and greed. At Carlyon Bay, Nicholas Crane discovers an unusual beach. Mark Horton visits the Isles of Scilly to reveal ancient tombs on these "isles of the dead". Miranda Krestovnikoff discovers how nature can turn a shipwreck into a sanctuary for wildlife, and Alice Roberts investigates the Cornish light that has inspired generations of artists. Plus Britain's smallest football league.
2	5	"Dublin to Derry"	Roger Ford-Hutchinson	3.74m (2)	23 November 2006
How the sea has shaped the island that is Ireland – both North and South. Miranda Krestovnikoff joins the punters at a unique horse race by the sea, while Mark Horton investigates the salvage of the SS Great Britain, the world's first ocean liner. Neil Oliver finds an eyewitness to the untold story of the surrender at Derry of the German U-boat fleet, and Alice Roberts visits a very unusual house.
2	6	"Newcastle to Hull"	Richard Maude	3.73m (2)	30 November 2006
Neil Oliver explores the ancient coastal home of the Venerable Bede who, 1,300 years ago, wrote the first history of England. Meanwhile, Dick Strawbridge discovers how Middlesbrough's iconic Transporter Bridge put the town on the map, and Miranda Krestovnikoff learns about the kittiwake. Plus Alice Roberts finds out where North Sea gas first came ashore, and uncovers the secrets of Whitby jet.
2	7	"The Outer Hebrides"	Jane McWilliams	3.85m (1)	7 December 2006
The hauntingly beautiful Mingulay, abandoned 100 years ago, is among some dramatic islands on view in this episode. Miranda Krestovnikoff visits Eriskay to unearth the true story behind the classic Ealing comedy Whisky Galore! Neil Oliver meets the man who embarked on a 750-mile kayak trip from Glasgow to the Outer Hebrides. And on Lewis, scientist Mike Bullivant re-creates an attempt to convert peat into oil.
2	8	"Felixstowe to Margate"	Jason Holmes	3.92m (1)	14 December 2006
Neil Oliver explores the wreck of the SS Richard Montgomery in the Thames estuary that could explode with a force that would devastate the coast. Alice Roberts savours the sea salt at Maldon, and Miranda Krestovnikoff goes in search of the thornback ray, an exotic species that feeds on the seabed close to the capital. Mark Horton digs into the seafaring history of London and Neil Oliver re-creates a remarkable cricket match.

=== Series 3 (2007) ===
The third series of Coast was originally aired on BBC2 during the summer of 2007. In common with the previous series, the journey does not follow a circular course; the series starts in Shetland and finishes in Dover.

The subtitle of the series is A Journey of Discovery.

Series no.	No. in series	Title	Directed by	UK Ratings (BBC2 Rank)	Original release date
3	1	"Shetland to Orkney"	Eleanor Horne	3.67m (3)	3 June 2007
Neil Oliver joins an expedition climbing the Old Man of Hoy in Orkney and finds out about the Second World War freedom fighters who risked their lives running the "Shetland Bus". Miranda Krestovnikoff goes in search of an elusive octopus, Nicholas Crane finds evidence of a tsunami that devastated Britain 7,000 years ago and Alice Roberts unearths a mysterious skeleton that reveals more about the lives of ancient Shetlanders.
3	2	"Bournemouth to Plymouth"	Paul Barnett	4.35m (1)	10 June 2007
Journeying along the coast from Bournemouth to Plymouth, Neil Oliver finds out about the building of Britain's most famous lighthouse on the perilous Eddystone rocks. Meanwhile, Alice Roberts investigates the secret formula for the perfect sandcastle and Dick Strawbridge joins an American serviceman on his emotional return to the beach where he was left for dead during the Second World War's secret, and disastrous, Operation Tiger.
3	3	"Southport to Whitehaven including the Isle of Man"	Dick Sharman	3.43m (6)	17 June 2007
In the north-west of England, Neil Oliver discovers why the Americans attacked the port of Whitehaven, Hermione Cockburn investigates the alarming rate that the Southport sands are disappearing into the sea, and Miranda Krestovnikoff goes in search of the biggest shark in British waters. Meanwhile, Alice Roberts meets a woman with a remarkable story of childhood in the Isle of Man's internment camps during the Second World War.
3	4	"Cardiff to St. David's"	Jason Holmes & Richard Trayler-Smith	4.01m (1)	24 June 2007
Neil Oliver goes along for the ride as "Babs", the 1920s land speed record-breaking car, returns to Pendine Sands, and Miranda Krestovnikoff finds out about the dolphins raising their young along the Welsh coast. Meanwhile, Alice Roberts's excursion in a dredger might give ambitious homeowners food for thought, as she learns how the removal of sand from the seabed – to be used on building sites and in garden makeovers – is depleting a precious resource.
3	5	"Berwick-upon-Tweed to Aberdeen"	Matt Barrett	2.93m (1)	1 July 2007
Miranda Krestovnikoff puts St Abbs' reputation as one of the foremost sites for underwater wildlife to the test as she dives into a marine reserve there. Alice Roberts finds out how the experts propose to save the Forth Road Bridge from the looming threat of rust, while Neil Oliver re-creates a wartime scheme which involved training seabirds to find German submarines.
3	6	"Galway to Baltimore"	John Trefor	2.94m (4)	24 July 2007
For the first time, the experts visit the west coast of Ireland. Neil Oliver discovers what prompted Columbus's voyage to America, as Miranda Krestovnikoff listens in on some dolphin conversations. Meanwhile, Alice Roberts investigates the perplexing mystery of "The Burren", where Arctic and Mediterranean plants grow alongside each other, then sails out to the mystical monastery on the island of Skellig Michael.
3	7	"King's Lynn to Felixstowe"	Oliver Clark	2.97m (2)	31 July 2007
Neil Oliver evokes memories of the Cold War as he explores an abandoned radar site, while Hermione Cockburn meets a woman who was involved in top-secret work during the Second World War. As Mike Horton reveals the perilous state of some seaside piers, Alice Roberts indulges her interest in art when she visits Southwold, a Suffolk town which has inspired numerous painters in their artistic endeavours.
3	8	"The Channel Islands to Dover"	Andrea Buffery	3.37m (1)	7 August 2007
Neil Oliver recounts the tragic tale of Captain Matthew Webb, the first man to swim the English Channel. Alice Roberts finds out how Jersey reinvented itself after the Nazi occupation, while Nicholas Crane remembers the coastal supply ships that kept Britain afloat during the Second World War. And Miranda Krestovnikoff visits the Gouliot caves on Sark, where sea creatures stranded during low tide fight to survive until the water returns to claim them.

=== Series 4 (2009) ===
The fourth series of Coast was originally aired on BBC2 during the summer of 2009. It was simulcast on BBC HD for the first time. The series visits foreign shores for the second time: along with a return to Ireland, France, the Faroe Islands, and Norway are all included due to the fact they share a connection to the UK coastline. The circular element of the journey, last seen in the first series, returns; starting in Whitstable and finishing in Hull.

Unlike the last two series, there is no series subtitle, however the series was renamed to Coast and Beyond — helping to signify that the journey takes in coastlines outside the British Isles.

Series no.	No. in series	Title	Directed by	UK Ratings (BBC2 Rank)	Original release date
4	1	"Whitstable to the Isle of Wight"	David Symonds	3.68m (2)	14 July 2009
The south coast of England was the home of movies long before a frame was shot in Hollywood, thanks to long hours of daylight and glamorous London actors holidaying by the sea. Neil Oliver tries his hand at directing his own silent movie. Alice Roberts re-lives the glamour days of the hovercraft and on the Isle of Wight, we go in search of dinosaur footprints, which prove the island has been on an epic voyage heading north from tropical climes 135 million years ago.
4	2	"France: Cap Gris-Nez to Mont-Saint-Michel"	David Symonds	3.34m (3)	21 July 2009
Castles are an integral part of the history and landscape of Britain, but the art of building a castle was brought across the channel by William the Conqueror. We visit the medieval quarry in France which supplied the stone for iconic buildings such as the Tower of London and Canterbury Cathedral. Nick Crane sets sail from Dover to visit the white cliffs of France. Connected by land before a mega flood carved the channel, Nick discovers that these divided cliffs are facing parallel challenges of coastal erosion.
4	3	"Land's End to Porthcawl"	Marc Edwards	3.45m (2)	28 July 2009
3,500 years ago, an international demand for Cornish tin put Cornwall at the centre of an international arms trade. Mixed with copper, Cornish tin made high quality weapons, giving birth to the British Bronze Age. Hermione Cockburn discovers what happened when American media mogul and inspiration for Citizen Kane William Randolph Hearst made a run-down castle with a sea view into a little hideaway for him and his mistress on the Welsh coast. Neil Oliver visits Porthcawl to trace the history of the Welsh Great Escape.
4	4	"Cork to Dublin"	John Trefor	3.56m (2)	4 August 2009
We visit Cork Harbour, Titanic's last port of call before sailing to disaster, to hear the story of one lucky Irish passenger who reluctantly had to disembark at Cork. Alice Roberts meets Waterford Crystal's chief scientist to learn how to turn the local beach's sand into glass. Hermione Cockburn creates her own mini earthquake on Killiney beach with a mercury dish and some dynamite, recreating an experiment performed 160 years ago that led to the understanding of the earth's tectonic plates.
4	5	"Anglesey to Blackpool"	Paul Barnett	3.41m (1)	11 August 2009
Blackpool is Britain's most visited seaside destination. How has the resort succeeded when others have gone under? The pleasure park is one of many innovative attractions imported here from America. Neil Oliver views the coast at high speed with a visit to the RAF's world famous "Pilot Factory". As he takes to the skies in a Hawk Jet with an instructor, can he travel from Anglesey to Blackpool and back in just under half an hour?
4	6	"Inner Hebrides to the Faroe Islands"	Lizzie Mottram	3.66m (1)	18 August 2009
The sea eagles of the island of Canna were hunted to extinction, but now they have been brought back. We climb into one of their nests perched high on a steep cliff to find out what their chances of survival are. Neil Oliver visits Europe's biggest super-quarry to receive an explosive lesson in how the rock is mined. Armed with a simple ruler on a Scottish beach, Nick Crane learns how the challenge of measuring our coastline led to a new branch of maths that could help our mobile phones get smaller.
4	7	"Norway: Lillesand to Svalbard"	Amanda Reilly	3.66m (2)	25 August 2009
In Coast's Norwegian odyssey we explore how the Ice Age is still affecting Norwegians today; a collapsing mountainside threatens to thunder down into one of the country's most beautiful fjords creating a devastating tsunami. Nick Crane visits the little town of Geiranger which sits in the path of the impending tidal wave.
4	8	"Rosyth to Hull"	Dick Sharman	3.92m (2)	1 September 2009
On Holy Island, we find out how a Viking attack inadvertently united the Anglo-Saxon kingdoms, creating a new national identity as they came together to resist a new enemy. Mark Horton navigates to Marine Esplanade in Ravenscar in search of the "town that never was". Destined to be a buzzing Victorian seaside parade, Mark uncovers why it is now just an empty field. Following three unsuccessful attempts to land a boat on Bass Rock, Miranda Krestovnikoff beats Neil Oliver to the challenge and is rewarded with a front row view of the diving gannets.

=== Series 5 (2010) ===
The fifth series of Coast was originally aired on BBC2 during the summer of 2010. It was simulcast on BBC HD. The series visits both France (for the second time) and Denmark (for the first time) exploring how these countries are linked to our own via the sea. The series opens with a journey around the Irish Sea centred on the Isle of Man; in the remaining episodes a rough circumnavigation is completed from Swanage to London.

As with the previous series, the name Coast and Beyond is retained – helping to signify that the journey takes in coastlines outside the British Isles.

Series no.	No. in series	Title	Directed by	UK Ratings (BBC2 Rank)	Original release date
5	1	"Heart of the British Isles: A Grand Tour"	Jane McWilliams	3.39m (2)	25 July 2010
In this first episode the team embark on an extraordinary circular tour of the Irish Sea to visit every country and territory within the United Kingdom. The hub for this wheel around the heart of the British Isles is the Isle of Man where Neil Oliver explores the small island. On the edge of the Irish Sea at Morecambe Bay, Alice Roberts gets trapped in quicksand to discover why it is so sticky and so deadly. In Northern Ireland, Miranda Krestovnikoff sees how seals cope with the struggle to find food as they bring up pups in the beautiful inland sea of Strangford Lough. Nick Crane goes sea cliff climbing on the remarkable rocks of Anglesey as he explores why this corner of North Wales is the site of some of Britain's biggest earthquakes.
5	2	"Swanage to Land's End"	Jason Holmes	2.88m (5)	28 July 2010
Neil Oliver performs the lead role in an extract from Shakespeare’s The Tempest on the stage of a remarkable coastal amphitheatre near Land's End. Nick Crane ventures out into the infamous "Portland Tidal Race" to see how this fearsome tidal surge creates some of the roughest waters in Britain, surprisingly close to the tourist beaches and Georgian splendour of Weymouth. Miranda Krestovnikoff goes in search of a family of white-beaked dolphins and Alice Roberts follows her nose to discover what gives the sea its distinctive smell. In Devonport, Mark Horton has privileged access to the historic dockyards to see where the wooden ships of Nelson’s Navy were built. Mark reveals how the steel fleet of the modern Royal Navy still relies on the age old skills of wood working.
5	3	"Brittany"	David Symonds	2.54m (6)	4 August 2010
Neil Oliver explores the province of Finistère, "The End of the Earth", and meets a lighthouse keeper made famous by one of the world's most reproduced photographs. Nick Crane joins the "Onion Johnnies", who gave us our stereotypical image of a Frenchman, complete with stripy tee shirt, beret and bicycle laden with onions. Alice Roberts reveals the life-saving chemical element that is locked away inside seaweed and Miranda Krestovnikoff dives for a seafood delicacy. At Carnac, Mark Horton wanders amongst the mysterious lines of standing stones, erected thousands of years before Stonehenge, to investigate their age-old connection with Britain.
5	4	"Gower to Anglesey"	Marc Edwards	2.79m (4)	8 August 2010
Neil Oliver takes part in an aerial dogfight to discover why a Nazi flying ace landed his top-secret new plane on Welsh tarmac at the height of the Second World War. Miranda Krestovnikoff visits a seabird paradise, the magical island of Skomer, and at Porth Oer, Alice Roberts attempts to solve the riddle of the "Singing Sands". What makes some very special British beaches whistle when you walk on them? Mark Horton visits an imposing castle at Harlech, one of the best preserved in Britain. Nick Crane explores the violent history of smuggling around the Gower Peninsula and abseils into an extraordinary stone structure concealed in the side of a sea cliff.
5	5	"Galway to Arranmore Island"	Chris Rushton	2.23m (7)	11 August 2010
Just five months before President John F. Kennedy was assassinated in Dallas, he was riding in an open-top limo through the crowded streets of Galway. Neil Oliver meets the photographer who managed to get up close and personal with the President and talk him into the perfect snap. Miranda Krestovnikoff explores an odd little island where the mountain hare population is thriving and Nick Crane investigates a local legend that says that Clew Bay has 365 islands, one for each day of the year. Alice Roberts unearths the remarkable remains of the oldest farm in the British Isles.
5	6	"Glasgow to Edinburgh via the Caledonian Canal"	Amanda Reilly & Matt Barrett	2.84m (3)	18 August 2010
Neil Oliver joins the crew of the last surviving coal-fired, steam-powered, "Clyde Puffer". Amateur artist Alice Roberts explores what drew Joan Eardley to Catterline and how her life was cut tragically short on the verge of great success. Nick Crane reveals how the majestic Loch Ness became part of Britain's biggest building project in the early 1900s. Miranda Krestovnikoff dives into Loch Creran to explore how the tiny worms built a giant reef known as Worm City. Hermione Cockburn visits the "Islands that Roofed the World" and Mark Horton unearths what remains of the mysterious and violent people who once ruled much of Scotland, the Picts.
5	7	"Denmark"	Mike Taylor	2.94m (4)	25 August 2010
The Danes top the polls as the happiest people on earth and Neil Oliver wants to know what they have to smile about. Nick Crane investigates how the Danish made a big business out of selling bacon to Britain. Alice Roberts sets sail in a full scale replica of a Viking longship to see how these ships gave Norsemen the advantage over the English in battle. Miranda Krestovnikoff meets some unflappable red deer. On Heligoland, Mark Horton reveals how in 1947 Britain's Royal Navy blew this tiny island apart in the largest non-nuclear explosion the world had ever seen and Dick Strawbridge gets access to the construction of one of the world's largest offshore wind farms.
5	8	"Hull to London"	Joanna Brame	3.42m (1)	1 September 2010
Neil Oliver visits the birth place of his seafaring hero Lord Nelson. On the eerie shingle bank of Orford Ness, Alice Roberts leads a team trying to recreate the original war-winning experiment which proved that radar would work. Off the Norfolk coast, Nick Crane explored the remarkable lost world of "Doggerland". Miranda Krestovnikoff wades out into the mud of the Wash", a vast tidal feeding ground for migrating birds. To investigate the appeal of the glorious Essex fishing smacks, Mark Horton joins a crew on competition around the Thames Estuary.

=== Series 6 (2011) ===
The sixth series of Coast was originally aired on BBC2 during the summer of 2011. It was simulcast on BBC HD. The series visits Belgium, the Netherlands, and Sweden (all for the first time) exploring how these countries are linked to our own via the sea. The series does not follow a circular course, beginning in London and ending in Sweden.

As with the previous two series', the name Coast and Beyond is retained – helping to signify that the journey takes in coastlines outside the British Isles.

Series no.	No. in series	Title	Directed by	UK Ratings (BBC2 Rank)	Original release date
6	1	"London to Antwerp"	David Symonds	1.96m (16)	5 June 2011
Nick Crane visits a project to build a new seaport for London, before travelling across the channel to Belgium, where he takes a ride on a tram that runs along the country's coastline. Alice Roberts learns how to be a seaside landlady in Margate, and Neil Oliver tells the story of British forces' efforts to stop Hitler's biggest battleships reaching the coast of Kent during the Second World War. Back in Belgium, Mark Horton reveals the city of Bruges's role in the history of brick-making, and Miranda Krestovnikoff goes shrimp-fishing on horseback.
6	2	"Devon and Cornwall"	Paul Barnett	3.05m (6)	26 June 2011
Nick Crane visits the Devon and Cornwall coastlines, joining a fishing expedition on board one of the last remaining Brixham trawlers. He explores a string of forts built by Henry VIII, before taking a ferry to the Isles of Scilly, where Miranda Krestovnikoff goes snorkelling in the underwater seagrass meadows. Mark Horton recalls how Lawrence of Arabia helped develop rescue boats in Plymouth, Dick Strawbridge learns about the steam-power revolution pioneered in the tin mines of Cornwall, and Alice Roberts discovers how weather far out at sea generates waves that hit the UK's shoreline.
6	3	"The Netherlands"	David Symonds	2.16m (12)	19 June 2011
The team travels to the Netherlands, where Nick Crane explores how Dutch engineers created massive coastal defences following the great North Sea floods in 1953, which killed thousands of people. Historian Tessa Dunlop investigates how the tulip trade nearly bankrupted the country 400 years ago, and Mark Horton finds out about a project to reclaim an area of land bigger than Greater London from the sea.
6	4	"The Western Isles and Shetland"	Michael Burke	2.94m (5)	3 July 2011
The team goes island-hopping around the Western Isles and out to Shetland. Nick Crane hunts for gannets on Eriskay, and Neil Oliver hears the tragic story of a 1918 shipwreck off the Isle of Lewis in which more than 200 servicemen returning from the First World War were drowned. Hermione Cockburn tests the acoustic qualities of Fingal's Cave on the uninhabited island of Staffa, and Miranda Krestovnikoff investigates a project to breed a super-strong Shetland pony.
6	5	"Wales: Border to Border"	Ross Young	2.27m (5)	10 July 2011
The team explores the Welsh coast. Nick Crane investigates evidence that a devastating tsunami hit 400 years ago, and finds out why scientists planning a trip to Mars find the local landscape a surprisingly good stand-in for the red planet's surface. Alice Roberts tests the claim that the world's first powered flight was made by a Welsh carpenter seven years before the Wright brothers and Dick Strawbridge reveals how, in 1947, a man on holiday to Anglesey came up with the design for a new car that would conquer the world – the Land Rover.
6	6	"Sweden and The Baltic Sea"	Mike Taylor	2.34m (7)	17 July 2011
The team explores British connections to the Swedish coast. Nick Crane views a mountain range still rising at the rate of one centimetre a year, and discovers that a similar phenomenon is also occurring in the Highlands. Alice Roberts reveals how merchant seamen from Hull helped save the Second World War military effort by sneaking a vital shipment of Swedish ball bearings past the German Navy. Mark Horton visits the wreck of the Vasa, a ship commissioned 400 years ago to spearhead the Swedish navy, only to sink on its maiden voyage.

=== Series 7 (2012) ===
The seventh series of Coast was originally aired on BBC2 during the early summer of 2012. It was simulcast on BBC HD. The format of the series changed significantly from previous series in that each episode has a theme featuring stories from every part of the British Isles instead of concentrating on one geographical area per episode.

In keeping with this change in format, the name Coast and Beyond has been dropped in favour of the original Coast. To further enforce this each episodes starts with a short introduction monologue from Nicholas Crane which begins with the statement that "Coast is home".

The seventh series was the first series not to feature Alice Roberts, one of the original presenters.

Series no.	No. in series	Title	Directed by	UK Ratings (BBC2 Rank)	Original release date
7	1	"The Mysteries of the Isles"	Various	2.88m (2)	13 May 2012
Investigating the lifestyles, history and legends of Britain and its people, beginning with a look at the nation's islands. Nick Crane learns how Fair Isle's small community has become so well established and Neil Oliver visits Orkney to explore conspiracy theories surrounding the death of Lord Kitchener. Tessa Dunlop heads to the Western Isles to investigate an optical phenomenon called the green ray, and new presenter Andy Torbet becomes the first person to ascend one of The Needles of the Isle of Wight. Plus, a performance by folk singer June Tabor.
7	2	"Life Beyond the Edge"	Various	2.54m (2)	20 May 2012
Exploring the lifestyles and history of some of the most extreme locations in Britain. Nick Crane visits the Isles of Scilly, Ruth Goodman walks the dangerous path traversed daily by the Branscombe Cliff farmers in Devon, while Mark Horton investigates the Transatlantic Telegraph service, and Hermione Cockburn learns how the fossil of a large sea creature found at St David's Head, Pembrokeshire, shaped understanding of Earth's history.
7	3	"The Hidden History of Harbours"	Various	1.94m (7)	27 May 2012
Exploring the history of Britain's harbours. Nicholas Crane visits Newlyn, Cornwall, where in 1854, a fishing boat set sail on the 12,000-mile journey to Melbourne, Australia. Dick Strawbridge explores the building of airships in Barrow-in-Furness, Cumbria, in the early 1900s, while Tessa Dunlop travels to Portsmouth to investigate the history of body art. Ruth Goodman hears how Birkenhead's harbour led to the opening of the world's first municipal park and there is a look at naval warfare re-enactments by Scarborough council staff.
7	4	"Peril from the Seas"	Various	1.82m (10)	3 June 2012
Exploring Britain's maritime stories. Nicholas Crane tells the tale of the Great Storm of 1703, which saw ships blown from British shores to Norway, while Ian McMillan discusses the fate of hospital ship Rohilla, which ran aground off Whitby, North Yorkshire, in 1914. Tessa Dunlop reveals the dangers of working in the dockyards where naval warships were built in the 19th century, and Dick Strawbridge is in Tiree in the Inner Hebrides, where he explains how the timings of the D-Day landings were determined by RAF weather forecasters. Andy Torbet searches for the elusive storm petrel on Alderney, in the Channel Islands.
7	5	"The Riddle of the Tides"	Various	1.99m (8)	10 June 2012
Exploring the tidal ebb and flow of the seas surrounding Britain. Nicholas Crane braves the dangerous rapids off the coast of Anglesey, and investigates a tidal predictor in Liverpool. Miranda Krestovnikoff visits Jersey's Seymour Tower to witness the marine life revealed at low spring tide, Tessa Dunlop compares the fashions in bathing suits favoured by different generations of beach-goers and Mark Horton travels to Poppit Sands, Pembrokeshire, to explore the remains of a 900-year-old fish trap.
7	6	"The Secret Life of Beaches"	Various	1.88m (10)	17 June 2012
Exploring the stories and histories of Britain's beaches. Nicholas Crane searches for leeches in the pebble-pools of Dungeness in Kent, and learns how the area was formed. Hermione Cockburn takes to the air to view sand art in Jersey, Andy Torbet visits one of the nation's most dangerous beaches, Tessa Dunlop inspects a steelworks built on the shore of Port Talbot, and in Aberlady Bay, East Lothian, Nick Hewitt unearths submarines that played a pivotal role in sinking the Tirpitz, one of Hitler's largest battleships.

=== Series 8 (2013) ===
The eighth series of Coast was broadcast starting 3 April on BBC2. It was simulcast on BBC HD. The series continued in the style started with the seventh series: each episode had a theme featuring stories from every part of the British Isles instead of concentrating on one geographical area per episode.

Series no.	No. in series	Title	Directed by	UK Ratings (BBC2 Rank)	Original release date
8	1	"Invaders of the Isles"	Various	TBA	3 April 2013
Nick Crane explores how the remarkable history of Guernsey reveals both the risks and rewards of invasion. Tessa Dunlop visits Norfolk to relive the forgotten Zeppelin blitz on Britain during the First World War, which began at Great Yarmouth in January 1915 when the first Britons were killed in an air raid. Ruth Goodman joins the friendly invasion of the Isle of Man by thousands of bikers for the annual Isle of Man TT races. On a tiny rocky outcrop in seas off western Scotland, Andy Torbet encounters remarkable animal invaders – water voles who are usually confined to mainland Britain. The Coast team also visits the remote Island of Stroma, which was abandoned following the invasion of the modern world.
8	2	"The Workers' Coast"	Various	TBA	10 April 2013
Nick Crane tells the chilling tale of an abandoned refrigeration plant whose workers kept Britain's biggest fishing fleet afloat. Nick joins a crack team of drivers on a race against time to precision-park hundreds of new British-built cars aboard a huge purpose-built car-transporter. Neil Oliver relives a remarkable tale: when thousands of shipyard workers on the River Clyde fought job losses, not by walking out on strike, but by 'working-in'. Tessa Dunlop reveals the astonishing, untold story of the secret of the Royal Navy's sea power, some 200 years ago. And Ken Dodd joins Coast's resident story-teller Ian McMillan to celebrate the entertainers who worked so hard to get laughs from the holidaymakers of Blackpool in its heyday.
8	3	"Joy of the Coast"	Various	TBA	17 April 2013
Nick Crane heads to the Western Isles in Scotland to attempt a daunting, long-coveted, mountaineering challenge on the Isle of Skye: climbing the fearsome Cioch. Nick also reveals how, in the mid-19th century, Thomas Cook was inspired by the new steamships criss-crossing Scottish seas to create his famous package tours, a novel concept that Cook went on to promote worldwide. Ruth Goodman learns how 150 years ago in this picturesque Cornish harbour women and men's livelihoods depended on their skills at 'contract knitting', making workwear to order. Poet and storyteller Ian McMillan seeks creative inspiration in the painter's paradise of St Ives, Cornwall. Tessa Dunlop takes the plunge into the glamorous history of British lidos, those temples of sun-worshipping pleasure which sprang up around our shores in the 1930s.
8	4	"Rivers and Seas Collide"	Various	TBA	24 April 2013
Nick Crane explores the wealth of wildlife and industry that are attracted to the Firth of Forth, the estuary that feeds Edinburgh. Nick also investigates a remarkable natural phenomenon discovered accidentally on this coast in 1834. First seen in the water of a canal near Edinburgh and dubbed the 'Soliton', it's a rare type of wave that appears to travel endlessly, without losing energy and without breaking up, even when it collides with another Soliton wave. Miranda Krestovnikoff witnesses the extraordinary transformation that salmon must make to their bodies to avoid death by dehydration as they migrate from freshwater to saltwater. Mark Horton discovers the astonishing struggle to build a rail tunnel deep under the Severn estuary between England and Wales. And multi-award winning folk-singer June Tabor returns to Coast.
8	5	"The Secret Life of Sea Cliffs"	Various	TBA	1 May 2013
Nick Crane explores some of the most spectacular Yorkshire sea cliffs in Britain. He joins secretive sea fishermen who have constructed a remarkable ropeway to make the perilous descent to fishing grounds at the foot of sheer sea cliffs. Nick also explores the ingenious water-powered mechanism that operates the Victorian cliff lift at Saltburn-by-the-Sea. Tessa Dunlop meets a woman who witnessed a top-secret American 'invasion' of the English south coast during the Second World War. On the sea cliffs that surround Ramsey Island, biologist Sarah Beynon hunts for the superheroes of the insect world who do the island's dirty work, the dung beetles.
8	6	"All at Sea"	Various	TBA	8 May 2013
The Coast team are all at sea, as they head offshore to explore surprising stories of love and death, cannibalism and communist submarines, seasickness and a seafaring prince. Nick Crane attempts one of the world's most fearsome yachting challenges, the Isle of Wight Round the Island Race. Mark Horton relives a gruesome tale of cannibalism and murder that scandalised Victorian Britain and still affects the law today. In Milford Haven, Ruth Goodman celebrates unsung heroes who arrived from distant shores. Naval historian Nick Hewitt searches out the remarkable remains of the submarines that threatened to sink Britain by strangling its sea trade. And one hardy bunch of sea-anglers, who all hail from Zimbabwe, find that a life on the ocean wave isn't all it's cracked up to be when they chance their hand with rod and line in the rolling seas off the coast of Yorkshire.

=== Series 9 (2014) ===
The ninth series of Coast was broadcast from 15 July 2014 on BBC Two. The series takes a journey around the British Isles and beyond, visiting France (again) and North America (for the first time) uncovering different stories along the way.

Series no.	No. in series	Title	Directed by	UK Ratings (BBC2 Rank)	Original release date
9	1	"The Channel"	Various	TBA	15 July 2014
The team explore stories on both sides of the English Channel. On the French channel coast Nick Crane explores life on the incredible outcrop of Mont St Michel, home to monks living an elevated ecclesiastical life high in a hilltop monastery that attracts a million tourists a year. Nick also investigates the network of remarkable seaforts that kept the port of St Malo safe from raids by the Royal Navy. Mark Horton reveals how two centuries ago when the French mapped the exact distance across the Channel it led to the birth of Britain's Ordnance Survey and the maps we use today. Miranda Krestovnikoff is on patrol with the Royal Navy who police the fishing boats which compete in the Channel.
9	2	"Secret Paths to Hidden Treasures"	Various	TBA	22 July 2014
Britain's last great wilderness, the stunning Cape Wrath, is the stomping ground for Nick Crane who discovers where wolves once trod and a hermit made his home. Ruth Goodman learns about the bizarre Victorian craze that drove women to extraordinary lengths collecting ferns on the perilous sea cliffs of Devon. Gem stone hunter Adam McIntosh finds an underwater path off the isle of Iona that leads to rare and beautiful 'Green Marble'. To learn the scientific secrets of fear used to design Blackpool's 'Big One' roller-coaster, Helen Arney rides this steel track of terror. Mark Horton reveals a coastal walk that takes in the whole history of Britain in just ten miles, on the little island of Lundy.
9	3	"The Explorers' Coast"	Various	TBA	29 July 2014
Nick Crane visits Cornwall for an artistic exploration of Britain's coast. The team discovers untold tales of Explorers around our shores, and far beyond, going down-under to Australia. In Cornwall Nick Crane takes to the water in a recreation of Britain's oldest known boat, a remarkable paddle-powered design from the Bronze Age. Nick goes on to tell the story of the fabled Explorer 'Pytheas The Greek' who first mapped our isles. He also follows the most remarkable artistic exploration of Britain's coast that produced hundreds of stunning full-colour illustrations in the age before photography. Mark Horton reveals how a man born on a tiny Scottish Isle went on to found the country of Australia two centuries ago. Tessa Dunlop investigates the Pilgrims' Fathers' hidden history. Why did the Pilgrims go to live in Holland for ten years before they founded modern America? Andy Torbet joins modern day scientific Explorers trying to count how many fish there are in our seas.
9	4	"Offshore!"	Various	TBA	5 August 2014
Coast travels to North America to explore British connections far offshore. Nick Crane journeys over the Atlantic to 'New Scotland', Nova Scotia, in Canada. Why did Scottish settlers flood offshore to Canada two hundred years ago, and how well did they succeed? Nick also discovers the rusting remains of the remarkable Transatlantic Telegraphic Cable, at the Canadian Cable station where he hears about the gossip Marilyn Monroe sent over the wires to our shores. Tessa Dunlop reveals the remarkable story of how in the Falkland's War the message to sink the cruiser 'General Belgrano' was sent 8000 mile to a submarine deep underwater. Miranda Krestovnikoff is seeking Britain's oldest puffin to discover how seabirds manage to live up to 50 years old offshore. Nick Hewitt uncovers the history of the lurking leviathan that guards the entrance to the Solent, the Nab Tower.
9	5	"Sea and the City"	Various	TBA	12 August 2014
Nick must master the controls of a massive crane as he lifts the lid on the frantic activity at the Mega-Port of Immingham. Built a century ago to export coal, now they import the fuel that keeps our lights burning. Tessa Dunlop uncovers an astonishing top-secret story of how Hitler's bombers could have flooded London and possibly won the war. Ruth Goodman investigates how one fearless Victorian woman took on the Government to prevent prostitutes being thrown into 'Lock Hospitals', a tale of the clandestine sex trade that scandalized Victorian Britain. Mark Horton reveals how Greenwich became the centre of global sea navigation, examining the competing madcap schemes to determine a ship's position at sea that were proposed by the world's best brains in the 18th century.
9	6	"Winter"	Various	TBA	19 August 2014
What becomes of our Coast in winter, its 'secret season', when we're at home? Nick Crane visits the storm capital of our shores, Cornwall, where he explores the worst lifeboat disaster of the last 60 years. Nick also discovers how wild winter seas bring surprising benefits to Cornish farmers growing cauliflowers and potatoes, and to the oyster fishermen of the Fal Estuary. Neil Oliver experiences the extraordinary Viking Fire Festival in Shetland our most northerly isles. Is their spectacular ritual of burning a Viking longship as authentic as it appears? On the wild western Isles of St Kilda a feral flock of sheep untouched for thousands of years battle to the death as winter approaches, and Andy Torbet throws himself into the fray.

=== Series 10 (2015) ===
The first episode was broadcast on 9 July 2015 on BBC Two and BBC Two HD.

Series no.	No. in series	Title	Original release date
10	1	"Our Holiday Coast"	9 July 2015
10	2	"Bounty from the Sea"	16 July 2015
10	3	"Ingenious Isles"	23 July 2015
10	4	"The Irish Sea"	30 July 2015
10	5	"Wild Waters"	6 August 2015
10	6	"Caves and Coves"	13 August 2015

=== Coast: The Great Guide (2016) ===
This eight part series for BBC Two features reports from previous series of Coast (with clips from early reports used as part of the Flying Visit feature) linked by new footage of Neil Oliver and Tessa Dunlop undertaking trips in various forms of sea transport (for example Dunlop on a tugboat, as well as on a cruise across the sea in episode 8: Our Irish Sea Coast).

== Coast Australia ==
Coast
- Also known as: Coast Australia
- Genre: Documentary
- Created by: Foxtel / BBC
- Directed by: Jane Manning
- Presented by: Neil Oliver
- Starring: Tim Flannery; Brendan Moar; Dr Emma Johnston; Dr Xanthé Mallett; Alice Garner (2015–)
- Composer: Alan Parker
- Country of origin: Australia
- Original language: English
- No. of series: 3
- No. of episodes: 22

Production
- Executive producers: Debbie Cuell (Foxtel); Phillip Smith (Foxtel); Duncun Cooper (BBC)
- Producer: Niamh Linnie
- Cinematography: Greg Kung
- Editor: Marcus Moro
- Running time: 60 minutes (approx.)

Original release
- Network: History Channel Australia; BBC Two (UK)
- Release: 2 December 2013 – 27 February 2017

Related
- Coast; Coast New Zealand

Coast Australia is a continuation of the Coast series, this time traveling to and exploring the coast of Australia. The show is presented by Neil Oliver who is joined by local Australian experts. The first series of 8 episodes was commissioned by Australian pay-TV provider Foxtel as a joint production with the BBC.

It was first shown on The History Channel in Australia from 2 December 2013, becoming the channel's second highest-rated show ever, and later aired in Britain on BBC Two from 14 May 2014.

A second series was commissioned and began airing in Australia on 12 January 2015, and on 2 April in Britain.

A third series commenced production in early 2016 and was aired between 9 January 2017 and 27 February 2017.

=== Presenters ===
The main presenters and their fields of expertise are:

- Neil Oliver (lead presenter) — geography
- Tim Flannery - paleontology
- Emma Johnston - marine ecology (not 2.05)
- Brendan Moar - geography and social history (not 1.07, 2.05)
- Xanthé Mallett - anthropology (not 2.01-2.02, 2.06-2.08)
- Miriam Corowa - social evolution (Series 1)
- Alice Garner - history (Series 2)

=== Series overview ===
Following the same format as the UK version, the show explores the Australian Coastline in sections, detailing both the natural and social history.

To introduce the series to as wide an audience as possible, the first series focused on well known and iconic Australian locations. These included the Great Barrier Reef, the Gold Coast, The Kimberley, Botany Bay, and Victoria's Shipwreck Coast. The series mixed the geological history of the Australian continent with modern post-European settlement of Australia.

After the success of the first series, the second series began to explore more unique locations like Norfolk Island, Torres Strait, and the Gippsland Lakes. It also took in more Aboriginal history, as well as visiting South Australia for the first time.

Series	Episodes	Originally aired	
Series	Episodes	History Channel Australia	BBC Two
1	8	2 December 2013	14 May 2014
2	8	12 January 2015	2 April 2015
3	8	9 January 2017	27 March 2017

==== Series 1 (2013) ====
The first series of Coast Australia aired on 2 December 2013 on the History Channel in Australia and on 14 May 2014 on BBC Two. Comprising 8 episodes, the series looked at iconic landmarks throughout Australia like the Great Barrier Reef, Botany Bay, and the Gold Coast.

Series no.	No. in series	Title	Original release date
1	1	"The Kimberley: Broome to Freshwater Cove"	2 December 2013
In the pristine Kimberley of Western Australia Neil Oliver discovers Broome's dark pearling history and the delicate science of their cultivation. Tim Flannery walks in primeval tracks along the legendary Dinosaur Coast. Xanthe Mallett explores a unique maritime war grave. Brendan Moar learns the art of Indigenous Raft making and Emma Johnston investigates the lush, protected habitat of migratory shorebirds. Finally Neil Oliver wrestles the Southern Hemisphere's biggest tides at the surging Horizontal Falls, and finally experiences the dreaming stories through a little sacred maintenance on some ancient rock art.
1	2	"Sydney: Botany Bay to North Head"	9 December 2013
Across the glittering waters of Sydney, Neil Oliver explores the network of fortification to protect "Fortress Sydney", and discovers how close the city came to being taken in WW2. Xanthe Mallett learns how to make lime as the convicts did in her quest to understand the importance of oysters in building the early colony. Tim Flannery reveals the geological secrets of the city's vast and sprawling harbour and unlocks the riddle of the rivers that had Captain Philip baffled in 1788. Brendan Moar examines an international icon in engineering and design, and reveals the story of those who made the greatest sacrifice. Emma Johnston hunts for tropical fish in Sydney's temperate and diverse harbour.
1	3	"Great Barrier Reef: Lizard to Heron Island"	16 December 2013
Neil Oliver begins this stunning journey through the world's largest coral reef in the wake of James Cook, and in the hands of the Australian Navy's hydrography team. Brendan Moar discovers an Australian community overcoming wretched beginnings by renewing island family ties. Tim Flannery is granted rare access to a scientific research zone to examine coral history. Xanthe Mallett dives a spectacular wreck in search of answers about its calamitous sinking. On an idyllic island, Neil Oliver uncovers a bloody tale of cultural misunderstanding. Finally, at the southern end of the Great Barrier Reef, Emma Johnston heads underwater with Google to take the reef into homes around the world.
1	4	"Tasmania: Freycinet to Bruny Island"	23 December 2013
In the tranquil south-east of Tasmania, Neil Oliver probes Port Arthur's harsh penal history. Brendan Moar examines the dramatic grip of lighthouse life on a remote Island. Emma Johnston dives into an underwater battleground to see how science and industry are saving the marine neighbourhood. Neil joins the Southern Hemisphere's largest wooden boat festival. Tim Flannery investigates Hobart's long and illustrious role in Antarctic exploration. Finally, Xanthe Mallett delves into the violent history of whaling, and the legacy that helped build a colony.
1	5	"Gold to Sunshine Coast"	30 December 2013
On Australia's shiny holiday coast Miriam Corowa investigates the engineering behind the 1970s Florida-style canal system of the Gold Coast. Neil Oliver heads to Peel Island to see the remains of a bleak chapter in history. Xanthe Mallett scours a WW2 fortification at what could have been Australia's front line, and discovers what life was like waiting for the war to arrive. Brendan Moar dives headlong into a dangerous current to investigate first hand the science of rips. Emma Johnston joins a scientific hunt for dugongs, in the hope of saving them. Finally, Tim Flannery travels to Fraser Island to investigate what's at the end of the line for the longest sand drift system in the world.
1	6	"Victoria: Mornington to Port Campbell"	6 January 2014
Along this historic stretch of coast, Neil Oliver explores Cape Otway and the beacon that helped birth a nation. Tim Flannery scours the water for evidence of the marine megafauna that roamed ancestral Port Phillip Bay. Brendan Moar uncovers the history of the Great Ocean Road, and, armed with his pick, grasps the challenges of building a now world famous coastal road in the 1920s. Emma Johnston hunts for the delicate weedy seadragon and discovers a tragic tale of one artist much captivated by its vivid beauty. On the historic Loch Ard wreck, Xanthe Mallet dives for clues about how and why disaster struck, with only two lives saved, while Miriam Corowa discovers why the coast at Bells Beach keeps pumping out the perfect waves.
1	7	"Darwin to the Cobourg Peninsula"	13 January 2014
Tim Flannery begins this Top End adventure at Victoria Settlement and its tragic history in the struggle to colonise Australia's northern frontier. Neil Oliver examines the ferocious bombing of Darwin and a remarkable story of reconciliation between former enemies. Miriam Corowa confirms that not all Hollywood dreams come true especially along this unforgiving coast. Xanthe Mallett goes on patrol with Australian Customs and Fisheries to hunt for killer ghost nets. And no Top End story would be complete without a crocodile - Emma Johnston draws blood in the name of science.
1	8	"Coral Coast: Wedge Island to Cape Range"	20 January 2014
On this wind-swept coast, Neil Oliver investigates why no one survived the attack on HMAS Sydney in its dramatic battle with a German raider in 1941. Xanthe Mallett heads to the Houtman Abrolhos islands and unearths the gruesome tale of the Dutch Batavia murders of 1629. In Shark Bay Tim Flannery finds 3 billion year old life, while Neil Oliver explores why Carnarvon's jetty was once the life-blood of the Gascoyne region. Emma Johnston witnesses why the world's largest fish keeps returning to the crystal waters of Ningaloo Reef, and Brendan Moar catches up with coastal nomads off the grid, on the edge of the continent.

==== Series 2 (2015) ====
The second series of Coast Australia aired on 12 January 2015 on the History Channel in Australia and on 2 April 2015 on BBC Two. After the success of the first series exploring more familiar areas, the second series began to investigate lesser known sections of Australia including Norfolk Island and the Gippsland Lakes.

Series no.	No. in series	Title	Original release date
2	1	"Victoria: Mornington Peninsula to the Gippsland Lakes"	12 January 2015
In the opening episode of Coast Australia’s second season, Neil Oliver becomes one of only five people known to have set foot on the isolated island known as Skull Rock, as he joins the first scientific expedition there to discover what life it has sustained over millennia. At Eagle’s Nest, Tim Flannery delves into pre-history, revealing his own role in discovering Australia’s polar dinosaurs. Neil heads offshore to explore the incredible engineering feat that keeps Bass Strait oil pumping, even under a hundred-year wave. while Alice Garner visits Victoria’s notorious Cheviot Beach, reliving the fateful day Australia lost its Prime Minister to these inclement waters. Neil then travels to Phillip Island, and reveals how an entire town was removed to save the penguins. Brendan Moar tackles the tricky sport of Blo-Karting along the flat sands of Waratah Bay, on the Gippsland Lakes, Emma Johnston hunts for a brand new species of dolphin, and finally Neil Oliver takes to the skies with aviator Judy Pay, for an unforgettable tour of the Bass Strait Coast in a fully restored warbird.
2	2	"South Australia: Kangaroo Island & Port Adelaide to the Limestone Coast"	19 February 2015
Neil Oliver takes to the air on an RAAF training mission to seek and destroy submarine invaders. Tim Flannery has a close encounter with history as he uncovers an unlikely meeting between French and English navigators Flinders and Baudin at Encounter Bay. Brendan Moar visits the moody Coorong to remember the ground-breaking Australian film Storm Boy. Neil Oliver investigates the quest to preserve Adelaide’s mother-ship, freshly saved from Scottish ruin. Emma Johnston dives deep into the stunning underwater caverns of the Limestone Coast to understand their formation. In Robe, Alice Garner gets a taste of how Victoria’s gold rush was the making of this coastal town across the border, and Neil Oliver examines new archaeological evidence of a wild fur trade that sprung up on remote Kangaroo Island, and its lasting impact on the endangered sea lions of Seal Bay.
2	3	"Northern New South Wales: Byron Bay to South West Rocks"	26 January 2015
In much-loved Byron Bay, Neil Oliver unearths the town’s surprisingly dirty history. Tim Flannery uncovers one of the most breathtaking adventures ever to have touched the Australian coast; the world’s longest recorded unbroken raft journey, that arrived in Ballina in 1973. Neil Oliver investigates a war along this coast that the authorities were determined to cover up, at great personal cost. In the pretty seaside town of Woolgoolga, Brendan Moar uncovers the historic roots of the largest regional population of Sikhs in the country. Off the coast of Coffs Harbour, Xanthe Mallett floors it with 600 horsepower of high-octane speed. Emma Johnston joins a grey nurse necropsy, and a dive, in search of the endangered species' hidden killers. At South West Rocks, Alice Garner discovers the surprising high society created by German internees during World War II. Finally, in the name of science, Neil Oliver launches a research missile into the East Australian Current.
2	4	"South Western Australia: Perth to Augusta"	2 February 2015
Neil Oliver begins this journey in the rigging of the Duyfken, a replica 16th-century Dutch ship, the first known European vessel to visit Australia. Emma Johnston heads to Cockburn Sound to explore the world’s first fully submerged, large-scale wave energy conversion project. Neil Oliver learns of the professional triumph and personal tragedy behind the construction of Fremantle Harbour. Xanthe Mallett joins the Police Dive Squad off Dunsborough for an exercise in underwater body retrieval. Neil Oliver retraces the steps of six Irish prisoners-of-conscience whose daring escape off Rockingham beach nearly triggered a war with the United States. Tim Flannery travels to the vineyards of Margaret River to see if he can taste the maritime clime in its signature drop. Neil Oliver discovers the perfect Coast vehicle to gad about in, while Alice Garner visits a small coastal chapel in Prevelly to explore its link to a wartime history of resistance on Crete. Finally Brendan Moar journeys to Augusta to expose the strength of a great pioneer, and her legacy as a world-class botanical collector.
2	5	"Torres Strait"	9 February 2015
In Australia’s extreme North, Neil Oliver arrives on Horn Island to uncover the role of Australia’s only indigenous battalion, a World War II fighting force of Torres Strait Islanders. On Possession Island Tim Flannery stands where James Cook finally claimed Australia for Great Britain, and discovers the riches that he missed. Xanthe Mallett ventures into the treacherous Adolphus Channel, the scene of Queensland’s worst peacetime maritime disaster. Neil Oliver visits Mer Island to tell the story of its most famous son, Eddie Mabo, who spearheaded Australia’s land rights' revolution. On Yam and Tudu Islands Tim Flannery is on the trail of fearsome headhunters to unearth the significance of their historic practice. Alice Garner joins an unusual border patrol on Saibai Island, less than four kilometres from Papua New Guinea, and finally Neil Oliver meets the Torres Strait’s most prominent musician, who started recording at the age of 70.
2	6	"Norfolk Island"	16 February 2015
On this lush-green island, 1,500 kilometres from the mainland, Neil Oliver wanders amidst penal ruins, as he discovers the inspiring legacies of two historic figures; the first an audacious convict, and the second a reforming commandant. Alice Garner meets descendants of the famous mutineers on the Bounty at their annual festival, and witnesses their cultural heritage in full swing. In the race to save one of the world’s most endangered birds, Tim Flannery finds an island ark in the making on nearby Phillip Island. On Mount Bates Emma Johnston uncovers the role of the island in the birth of radio astronomy. Neil Oliver tests his mettle with a meal of local dream fish, claimed to cause LSD-like hallucinations, and Brendan Moar explores the dangerous job of unloading vital supplies on an island without a harbour.
2	7	"Southern New South Wales: Seven Mile Beach to Gabo Island"	23 February 2015
Neil Oliver discovers the fatal engineering errors behind Cape St George Lighthouse that cursed Wreck Bay for four decades. In Callala Bay, Tim Flannery uncovers the life saving properties of seaweeds. On Gabo Island, on the Victorian side of the border, Emma Johnston witnesses a secret method for growing unusual pearls in wild abalone. In Eden, Neil Oliver investigates the truth behind the folktale of Old Tom, the country’s most famous killer whale. Alice Garner revisits the weather-bomb horror of the 1998 Sydney to Hobart Yacht Race, that became a race for survival. Tim Flannery unearths a piece of lost British treasure that went down with the Cumberland ship in World War I. In the peaceful town of Currarong, Brendan Moar explores a century-old love of coastal-gazing, and the mighty fibro beach house. Finally Neil Oliver recreates the great age of speed, racing vintage cars along their old stomping ground of Seven Mile Beach.
2	8	"Pilbara - Montebello Islands to Cape Keraudren"	26 March 2015
Tim Flannery begins this North-Western adventure in the remote Montebello Islands where he finds evidence of British atomic testing from 1952. Neil Oliver boards an iron ore carrier to discover only a tiny margin of error allowed in docking and loading these enormous vessels. Emma Johnston travels to Dampier to dig into the world’s largest solar salt operation. Tim Flannery explores the highest concentration of rock art in the world in an ancient gallery off the Burrup Peninsula. Emma Johnston blends science and art in Port Hedland’s intertidal reefs. At the former port of Condon, Neil Oliver discovers the pastoral history of a wool trade in the region, and then takes to the air above De Grey Station to appreciate the challenges of a one million acre property with coastal frontage. Finally at Cape Keraudren Neil Oliver revisits the scene of an extraordinary scientific expedition to prove Einstein’s Theory of Relativity.

==== Series 3 (2017) ====
The third series of Coast Australia aired on 9 January 2017 until 27 March 2017. The series covered 8 episodes, and visited a variety of locations around Australia, including Lord Howe Island, the Bass Strait Islands, and the North Kimberley.

Series no.	No. in series	Title	Original release date
3	1	"South Western Australia - Albany to Esperance"	9 January 2017
3	2	"North NSW - Lord Howe"	16 January 2017
3	3	"The North Kimberley"	23 January 2017
3	4	"Victoria - Port Melbourne to Portland"	30 January 2017
3	5	"North Queensland - Townsville to Cooktown"	6 February 2017
3	6	"New South Wales - Botany to Shoalhaven"	12 February 2017
3	7	"Tasmania - North Coast and Bass Strait Islands"	20 February 2017
3	8	"South Australia - Adelaide to Port Lincoln"	27 February 2017

==== Series 4 (2018) ====
Series no.	No. in series	Title	Original release date
4	1	"South Australia - Great Australian Bight"	TBA
4	2	"Coast of West Tasmania"	TBA
4	3	"Victoria - Port Phillip Bay, Melbourne"	TBA
4	4	"Northern Territory - Arnhem Land & The Gulf of Carpentaria"	TBA
4	5	"New South Wales - Sydney Harbour"	TBA
4	6	"Queensland - Cooktown to Karumba"	TBA
4	7	"Western Australia - Bunbury to Geralaldton"	TBA
4	8	"External Territories - Cocos and Christmas Islands"	TBA

== Coast New Zealand ==
Coast
- Also known as: Coast New Zealand
- Genre: Documentary
- Created by: TVNZ / BBC
- Presented by: Neil Oliver
- Country of origin: New Zealand
- Original language: English
- No. of series: 3
- No. of episodes: 18

Production
- Executive producer: Philip Smith

Original release
- Release: 19 April 2016 – 29 May 2017

Related
- Coast; Coast Australia

Coast New Zealand is a continuation of the Coast series, this time showcasing and exploring the coastlines of Aotearoa, New Zealand.

The show is presented by Neil Oliver who is joined by several local New Zealand experts.

The first and second series of 6 episodes was commissioned by TVNZ in a joint production with the BBC and Great Southern Television.

=== Presenters ===
The main presenters and their fields of expertise are:

- Neil Oliver (lead presenter) — geography (Series 1 & 2)
- Matt Carter - maritime archaeologist (Series 2)
- Hamish Campbell - geologist and palaeontologist (Series 2)
- Jacky Geurts - marine biologist (Series 2)
- Riria Hotere - author (Series 2)

=== Series 1 (2016) ===
The first series of Coast New Zealand aired on 19 April 2016 on TVNZ On Demand in New Zealand.

Comprising 6 episodes, the series consists of three episodes on each of New Zealand's main islands.

Series no.	No. in series	Title	Original release date
1	1	"Fiordland: Milford Sound to Puysegur Point"	19 April 2016
1	2	"East Cape: White Island to Mahia Peninsula"	26 April 2016
1	3	"Top of the South: Farewell Spit to Picton"	3 May 2016
1	4	"Auckland"	10 May 2016
1	5	"Far North"	17 May 2016
1	6	"Deep South"	24 May 2016

=== Series 2 (2017) ===
The second series of Coast New Zealand aired on 24 April 2017 on TVNZ in New Zealand.

Comprising 6 episodes, Scottish historian, archaeologist, author, and broadcaster Neil Oliver returns to explore the panoramic beauty and history of New Zealand's coastlines.

Series no.	No. in series	Title	Original release date
2	1	"West Coast"	24 April 2017
2	2	"Coromandel"	1 May 2017
Neil Oliver has his world turned upside down in Pauanui, while Marine Biologist Jacky Geurts delves into Whangamatā's mangrove wars.
2	3	"Stewart Island"	8 May 2017
Neil Oliver goes on a wild goose chase, and uncovers the hidden history of a remarkable singing star. Matt Carter delves into a brief encounter that left a curious legacy on the island.
2	4	"Hawke's Bay"	15 May 2017
Neil Oliver tackles a coastal sport like no other and encounters one of the world's great survivors at an exclusive haven for vulnerable species.
2	5	"Christchurch"	22 May 2017
Neil Oliver investigates the origins of the New Zealand accent and goes in search of a toxic arachnid with a tortured love life.
2	6	"Taranaki"	29 May 2017

=== Series 3 (2018) ===
The third series of Coast New Zealand began airing on 22 April 2018 on TVNZ in New Zealand.

Comprising 6 episodes, Scottish historian, archaeologist, author, and broadcaster Neil Oliver returns to explore the panoramic beauty and history of New Zealand's coastlines.

Series no.	No. in series	Title	Original release date
3	1	"Wellington"	22 April 2018
3	2	"Chatham Islands"	29 April 2018
Neil Oliver visits New Zealand's remotest communities in the far-flung Chatham Islands.
3	3	"Bay of Plenty"	6 May 2018
3	4	"North Otago"	13 May 2018
Neil Oliver explores the historic Victorian-era town of Oamaru, New Zealand's self-described "Capital of Steampunk", visits the origins of Truby King's Plunket Society infant care in Karitane, and the unique Moeraki Boulders.
3	5	"Kaipara Harbour"	20 May 2018
3	6	"South Westland"	27 May 2018

== Footnotes ==
1. This closing narration was part of a promotion for the tie-in BBC-sponsored walks and accompanying booklet, and was removed from many of the repeat showings.
2. Series 1 Episode 13 was broadcast as a series' highlight programme which also looking at the future of the coastline. The episode is not included in the DVD release for the series.
3. First mentioned in the introduction of Series 1 Episode 1.
4. The credit for "Additional Writing by..." only appears on episodes shown in Series 1.
5. Series 6 Episode 2 was broadcast the week after Episode 3 due to over-running coverage of the 2011 Canadian Grand Prix.
6. Due to the revised format of Series 7 each episode is credited to various directors.
