= Hermione Cockburn =

British television and radio presenter

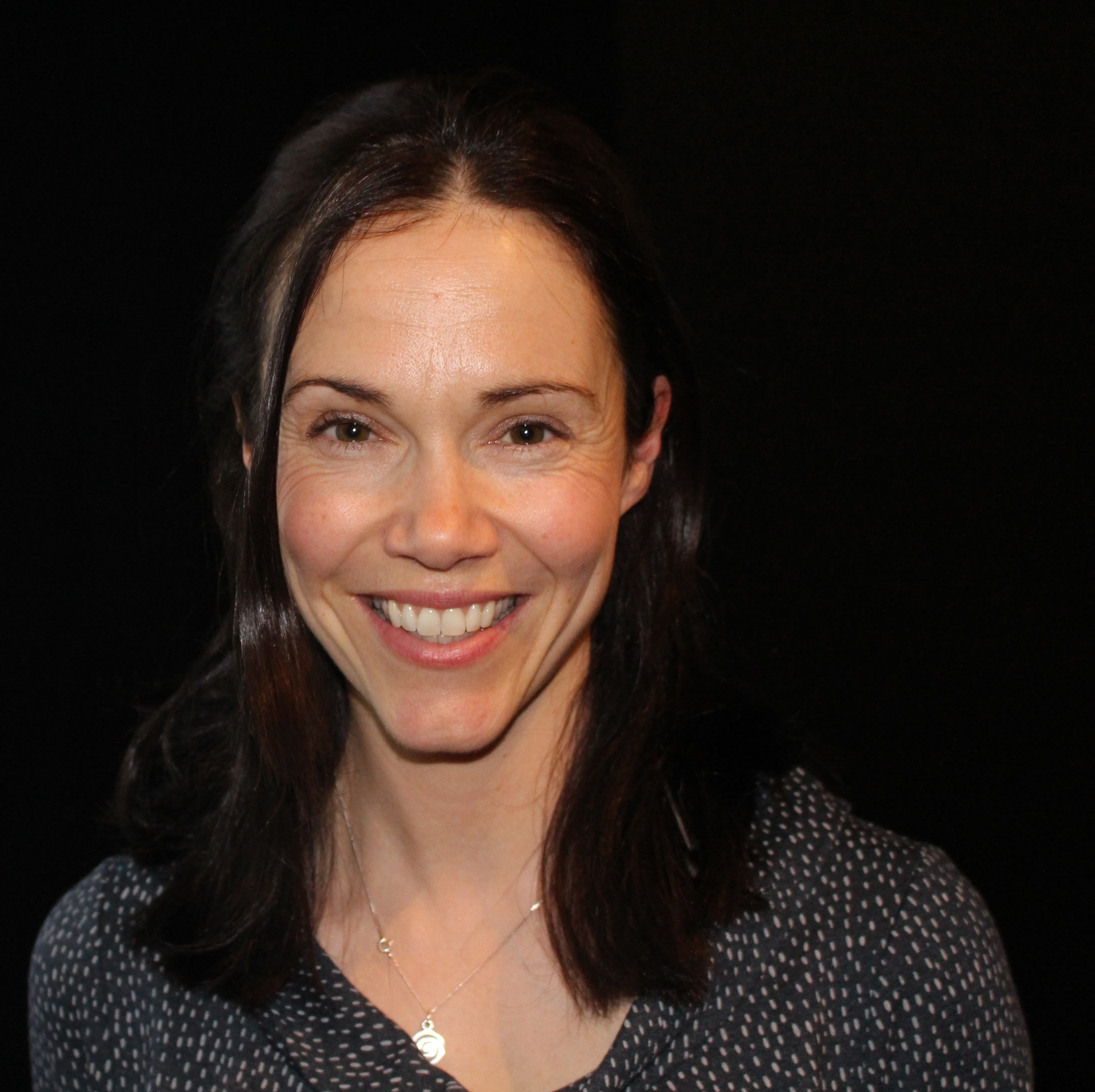
- Hermione Cockburn at the 2014 Edinburgh International Science Festival
- Born: 1973 (age 52–53); Sussex, England
- Occupations: Television and radio presenter
- Children: 2

Hermione Anne Phoebe Cockburn OBE FRSE (born 1973, Sussex, England) is a British television and radio presenter specialising in scientific and educational programmes. She is currently Scientific Director at Our Dynamic Earth.

== Early life and education ==
Cockburn grew up in Cuckfield in Sussex. She has a PhD in geomorphology from the University of Edinburgh, and has worked at various academic institutes including a two-year post-doctorate at the School of Earth Sciences at the University of Melbourne.

== Career ==
She has carried out extensive fieldwork in Antarctica, Australia, and Namibia. In 1999, Cockburn helped establish the education service at Our Dynamic Earth, a science centre and visitor attraction in Edinburgh, Scotland.

In 2002, she won BBC Talent's Science on Screen competition and co-presented the Tomorrow's World Award Show on BBC One. Then, in 2005, Cockburn co-presented What the Ancients Did for Us with Adam Hart-Davis for BBC Two, exploring the scientific legacy of ancient civilisations, before joining the team of Rough Science (also on BBC Two), replacing Kathy Sykes for the sixth series.

Expert contributions for the BBC Television series Coast have included explanations of Scottish geomorphology, geoarchaeology and engineering geology. In 2008, she presented the BBC Television/Open University documentary series Fossil Detectives for which she also wrote the companion book. From 2005 to 2010, she was the regular presenter of Resource Review on the Teachers' TV channel.

She is an associate lecturer with the Open University, teaching environmental science in Scotland.

Cockburn was appointed Officer of the Order of the British Empire (OBE) in the 2021 New Year Honours for services to public engagement in science.

== Personal life ==
Cockburn is married and has two sons.

== Works ==
- Cockburn, Hermione; Palmer, Douglas (4 September 2008). The Fossil Detectives. BBC Books. ISBN 978-1-846-07577-3.

== Awards and honours ==
In 2019, she was elected a Fellow of the Royal Society of Edinburgh.

In July 2024, Cockburn received an honorary doctorate from The University of the West of Scotland.
