= John Trefor =

John Trefor is a BAFTA Cymru-winning British television director and producer.

== Biography ==
Trefor began his career at the BBC as a director and producer on the series This Land in 2002 and Hidden Gardens in 2003.

His greatest success to date came as a director and producer on the series Coast from 2006 to 2009, for which he won a BAFTA Cymru in 2008.

He has also produced and directed documentaries Hadrian in 2008 and Montezuma in 2009 to tie-in with major exhibitions at the British Museum.

== Awards ==
- 2008 BAFTA Cymru for Best Documentary: Coast

== Filmography ==
Producer and director

- This Land (2002)
- Hidden Gardens (2003)
- Coast (2006–2009)
- Hadrian (2008)
- Montezuma (2009)
