= Fossil Detectives =

BBC TV documentary series

- BBC book cover
- Genre: Documentary
- Directed by: Kerensa Jennings
- Presented by: Hermione Cockburn
- Theme music composer: David Lowe
- Country of origin: United Kingdom
- Original language: English
- No. of seasons: 1
- No. of episodes: 8

Production
- Executive producers: Fiona Pitcher; Catherine McCarthy
- Producer: Kerensa Jennings
- Cinematography: Toby Strong; Mark McCauley
- Running time: 30 minutes
- Production company: The Open University

Original release
- Network: BBC Four
- Release: 21 August – 9 October 2008

Related
- Coast

Fossil Detectives is a 2008 BBC Television documentary series in which presenter Hermione Cockburn travels across Great Britain exploring fossil sites and discovering the latest scientific developments in geology and palaeontology. The show is a spin-off of Coast.

== Production ==
The series was produced by the BBC Natural History Unit for the Open University.

== Reception ==
Chris Lambert writing in The Times introduced this, "entertaining new eight-part series", and commended guest, David Attenborough, "who, with trademark infectious enthusiasm, reveals his early passion for fossil hunting". Emily Ford said that, "Palaeontologists probably still curse Ross from Friends for giving their profession a reputation of such yawn-inducing dullness, but you don’t have to be a prehistory nut to enjoy fossils". "And you can see David Attenborough get all misty-eyed as he caresses the vertebrae of a long-lost Diplodocus."

Anna Lowman writing about episode two in The Guardian commended it as a "quirky documentary," and a "cosy Open University-produced programme," with the, "Fossil Detectives (apparently comprising just one very enthusiastic lady)". Nancy Banks-Smith went on to say, "there is nothing that would not be improved by the addition of a dinosaur", adding, "which is why David Attenborough said that he would like to be back in the time of the dinosaurs. 'To film it', he added, brightening visibly. Of course, his brother felt much the same way, but that ended rather badly." Sarah Dempster writing about episode three in the same publication commended this, "affable archaeology series," for telling us about, 'special soil and "evolutionary robotics', before showing us something beige that was once, apparently, a quite important dinosaur. Champion."

== Episodes ==
Life began here in Britain more than a billion years ago. And when dinosaurs and other strange creatures roamed our land, they left fascinating clues behind. Fossils hold the key to discovering the secrets of ancient life and allow us a tantalising glimpse of Britain’s prehistoric past. Mountains the size of Everest have come and gone, and the evidence is all here in the rocks, in the landscape, and in the fossils buried deep inside. We’re on a mission to find and analyse that evidence, to unlock the secrets of the past and to discover lost worlds. So get ready for some time travel with the fossil detectives.

— Hermione Cockburn’s opening narration

=== Episode one: Central England ===
Our journey starts in central England, home to some extremely rare and globally significant fossil discoveries and some of the world’s most advanced fossil science. We’ll meet a monster from the past and investigate T-Rex in Oxford, see extraordinary evidence of the world’s smallest fossilised… well you’ll have to watch to find out, hear from Sir David Attenborough about his early fossil detecting days in Leicestershire, and hunt for fossilised bugs in a housing estate.

— Hermione Cockburn’s opening narration

- Dr. Philip Wilby of the British Geological Survey in Nottingham examines soft-tissue, preserved by the Medusa effect, from a recently re-excavated Victorian fossil discovery.
- Dr. Phil Manning compares a T-Rex with William Buckland's Megalosaurus (the first scientifically identified dinosaur and the inspiration for Charles Dickens’ opening paragraph in Bleak House).
- Dr. Derek Siveter of Oxford University Museum and Dr. Mark Sutton of Imperial College London demonstrate virtual dissection that produces computer-models of microfossils.
- Cockburn visits the Wren's Nest National Nature Reserve in Dudley in search of the Calymene blumenbachii trilobite nicknamed the Dudley Bug by local 18th century quarrymen and a symbol of the town.
- Sir David Attenborough talks about his early fossicking for Ammonites, Belemnites and Brachiopods with his father Frederick around his childhood home in Leicestershire.
- Susan Cook of the Charnia Research Group at Charnwood Museum examines Ediacaran fossils (the oldest known animals), discovered in the Precambrian rocks of Charnwood Forest by Roger Mason.

=== Episode two: London ===
The Fossil Detectives are in London to track down evidence of the capital’s ancient past. We’ll see what Victorian scientists thought dinosaurs looked like, rediscover a lost world when hippos dominated the landscape here in the capital, find fossils in the most surprising places, and have a rare viewing of a private fossil collection at home with the most famous naturalist on planet Earth - Sir David Attenborough.

— Hermione Cockburn’s opening narration

- Botanist James Wong compares surviving Ginkgo, Horsetails and Sequoia with their fossilised predecessors in the Evolution House at Kew Gardens in London and warns against habitat loss and population growth.
- Cockburn examines the Portland Roach limestone facades of the buildings along Old Bond Street in search of fossilised oysters, muscles and snails to show that the evidence of prehistoric life is all around.
- Cockburn contemplates the recently discovered fossilised evidence of London's prehistoric climate, which supported hippos, elephants and lions, from the summit of the BT Tower.
- Cockburn examines the inaccurate statues of Megalosaurus and Iguanodon constructed by scientist Richard Owen for the world's first theme park at Crystal Palace Park in 1854.
- Sir David Attenborough displays the selected highlights from his personal fossil collection, including a Devonian fish, a Sauropod vertebrate, and a Trilobite track, at his home in London.

=== Episode three: West and Wales ===
We’ll bring dinosaurs back to life, follow in the fossilised footprints of our ancestors and reveal why fossils were once thought to be food for the dead. Our adventures here in the West and North West of Britain give us a tantalising glimpse of how fossils link us back to our own past.

— Hermione Cockburn’s opening narration

- Dr. Philip Manning examines Britain's oldest dinosaur tracks at Bendrick Rock in Wales and T-Rex bones to show how evolutionary robotics can use these to create a virtual model of how dinosaurs moved.
- Sefton Coast volunteer ranger Gordon Roberts of the National Trust and Prof. Matthew Bennet of Bournemouth University examine fossilised human footprints revealed by ebbing tides on the beach at Formby.
- Cockburn examines the Red Lady of Paviland at the National Museum of Wales, which is the first anatomically modern human discovered in Britain and the oldest ceremonial burial in Europe.
- Geologist Susan Cooke examines the limestone escarpment of Wenlock Edge in Shropshire for Brachiopods, Trilobites, Bryozoans and Crinoids as evidence of early coral reefs.
- Cockburn examines the rare and delicate fossils preserved in silica that were discovered and rescued during the construction of the Ford engine plant at Bridgend in Wales.
- Prof. Michael Bassett of the National Museum of Wales explains some of the myth and folklore of fossils that were eventually dismissed with the development of the science of stratigraphy.

=== Episode four: North of England ===
The Fossil Detectives are on a journey through the British Isles, this time in the north of England. We’ll find out how John Lennon is linked to fossils, the truth behind the Victorians favourite stone, we’ll get a rare glimpse of a brand new fossil discovery, and investigate mysterious prehistoric footprints.

— Hermione Cockburn’s opening narration

- Cockburn abseils down the stratified rock layers of a cliff face on the Yorkshire coast to discover the fossilised footprints of Sauropod that walked across the sand or here during the Jurassic era.
- Dr. Philip Manning examines the recently discovered spine of an Ichthyosaur embedded in the sand of a Yorkshire beach but laments the loss of the skull that had been badly dug up.
- Botanist James Wong and jet carver Mike Marshall explain the origins of Whitby Jet, which was the basis of a Victorian jewellery industry in the area and the origin of the phrase Jet Black.
- Cockburn visits the Triassic period footprints of the Chirotherium (Rauisuchia) discovered 200 years ago and built into the porch of Christ Church, Higher Bebington that were the subject of a thesis by Rev. Charles Kingsley.
- Alan Bowden of the World Museum Liverpool at Merseyside analyses fossilised plant fragments to discover what the environment of Britain would have been like during the Triassic period.
- Cockburn examines the Ammonites, Belemnites and trace fossils embedded in the German limestone wall and floor tiles of Liverpool John Lennon Airport and the coal extracted from the National Coal Mining Museum for England in Wakefield.

== Contributors ==
=== Presenters ===
- Dr. Hermione Cockburn – Open University Associate Lecturer
- Dr. Phil Manning – University of Manchester Museum Research Fellow
- Dr. Anjana Khatwa – Jurassic Coast World Heritage Site Education Co-ordinator
- James Wong – Botanic Gardens Conservation International

=== Consultants ===
- Dr. Peter Sheldon – Open University Academic Consultant
- Dr. Janet Sumner – Open University Broadcast Learning Executive

== Companion book ==
- Cockburn, Hermione & Douglas Palmer (4 September 2008). The Fossil Detectives. BBC Books (paperback). ISBN 978-1-84607-577-3.
