= Mark Horton (archaeologist) =

British archaeologist (born 1956)

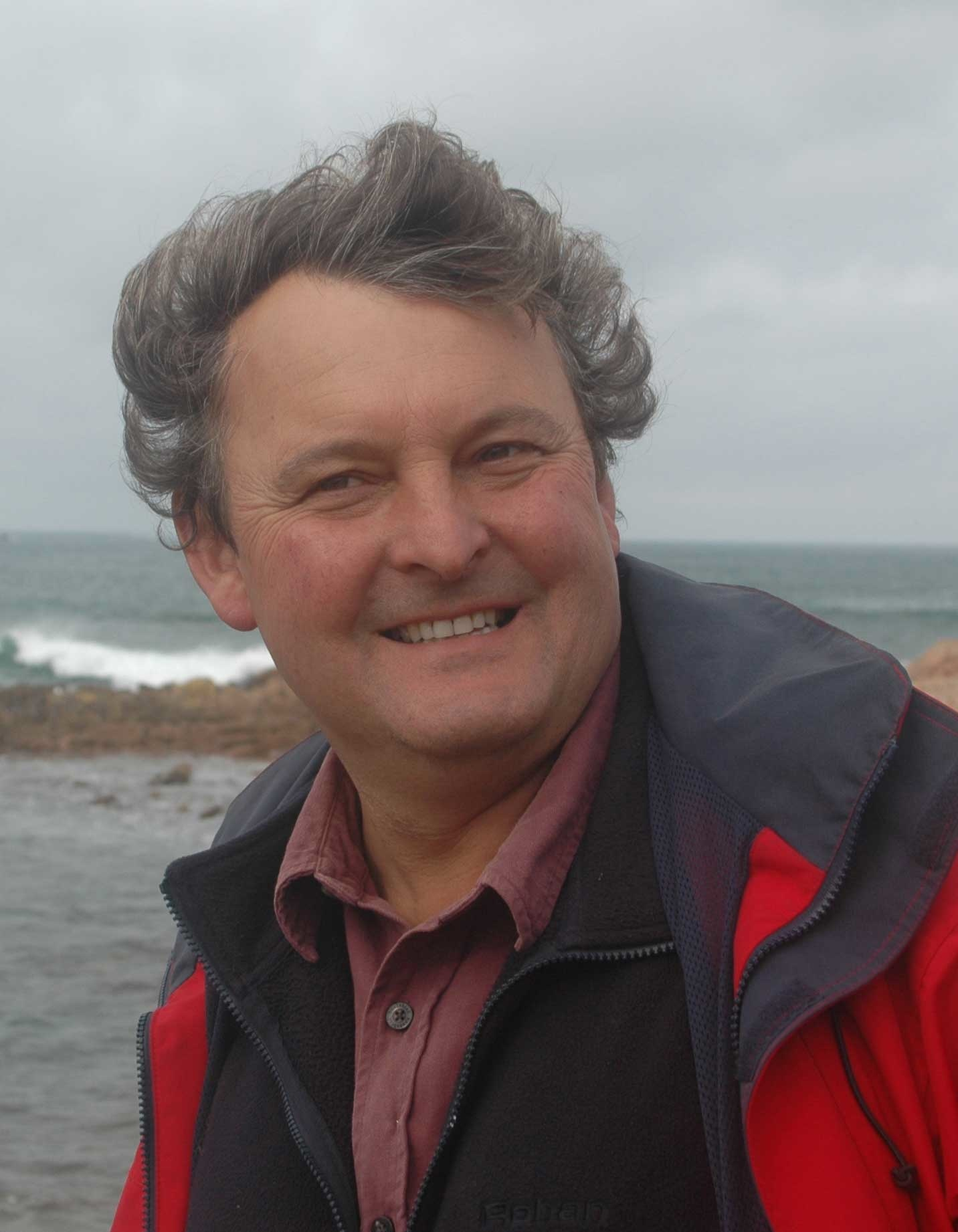
Horton in 2010

Mark Chatwin Horton, FSA, (born 15 February 1956) is a British maritime and historical archaeologist, television presenter, and writer.

== Academic career ==
Horton attended Peterhouse, Cambridge, graduating and receiving a doctorate. He is Professor of Archaeology and Cultural Heritage at the Royal Agricultural University in Cirencester, and Emeritus Professor at the University of Bristol. One of his former students is the archaeologist and television presenter Sam Willis. He is part of a project to establish the Cultural Heritage Institute in the former Great Western Railway carriage works at Swindon, offering research and masters training from 2020.

He has conducted excavations in Zanzibar, Egypt, the Caribbean, North America, Central America and France, as well as sites in Britain. His chief publications are on the Swahili site of Shanga, Kenya, between 1980 and 1986 and more recently sites on the islands of Zanzibar and Pemba, notably Tumbatu, Ras Mkumbuu, Mtambwe Mkuu and Chwaka.

His other excavations include the Scottish Darien scheme (1698–1700) in Panama; the Cistercian Abbey of Grosbot (Charente, France); the Bishop's Palace, Wells, Somerset; a medieval farmstead at Carscliffe, Somerset; Fishmongers Cave, Alveston, Gloucestershire, and he worked at Berkeley Castle (Gloucestershire) and Repton. In 2008-19 he undertook survey and excavation work in the Kherlen Valley in Mongolia. Between 2011 and 2019 he worked with the Sealinks Project, undertaking excavations on Pemba, Zanzibar, Mafia, Anjouan, Sri Lanka and Madagascar. A project in East Pemba combined archaeological investigations with ethnography and anthropology.

He also has an interest in Isambard Kingdom Brunel and directed the digitisation of the engineer's sketch books and letters at Bristol University library, which project was grant-aided by the Arts and Humanities Research Council in 2003.

He is currently Pro Vice-Chancellor, Research & Enterprise at the Royal Agricultural University.

He was elected a Fellow of the Society of Antiquaries of London on 7 May 1992.

== TV career ==
Horton's first television appearances sprang from his academic work in East Africa. He contributed to a programme by Time Life Television Lost Civilisations – Africa in 1996 and to a Channel 4 television programme on the Atlantic slave trade in 1998.

He was closely involved in the inception of the long-running Channel 4 television series Time Team and the third episode was filmed in his home town of Much Wenlock, Shropshire, in 1994. He has appeared on several subsequent programmes including Hylton Castle, Sunderland, in 1995, and Aston Eyre, Shropshire, in 1998. In 2000 he acted as tiles specialist on Time Team Live. Having invited Time Team to investigate the bones found by cavers in a cave in the village of Alveston, Gloucestershire, he appeared in the programme on this site shown in 2001. In 2008, further work on the site was included in a National Geographic / Channel Five documentary, Julius Caesar and the Druids.

He was a co-presenter on two series of the BBC Two production, Time Flyers 2002 – 2003. In 2004 he presented BBC Scotland's programme Darien: Disaster in Paradise, which was highly commended in the archaeological film category at that year's British Archaeological Awards.

Between 2005 and 2016 Horton was one of the team of presenters on the programme Coast, exploring the coastline of Britain. He also presents occasional pieces for BBC1 Inside Out, West and South West Regions. He was the archaeological consultant on the TV drama Bonekickers, shown on BBC One in 2008.

In 2017, he appeared in an episode of the Science Channel documentary Mysteries of the Missing (series 1, episode 6), investigating the possible relocation of the 16th-century English settlement of Roanoke Colony in Virginia from Roanoke to Croatoan Island. He is a regular contributor and presenter on Science Channel What on Earth?.

== Interests ==
Horton is a keen sailor and enjoys dinghy-sailing on the River Severn and restoring his historic 26-foot (7.9 m) yacht Mignonette, a Lone Gull design of Maurice Griffiths built in 1946–47. He lives on the banks of the Severn in a sixteenth-century house associated with Sir Francis Drake.

== Books ==
- 1996. Shanga: The Archaeology of a Muslim Trading Community on the Coast of East Africa. British Institute in Eastern Africa, Monograph Series 14. (with Helen W. Brown and Nina Mudida).
- 2001. The Swahili. Oxford: Blackwell (with John Middleton).
