= Paul Barnett (producer) =

English TV producer

- Born: September 1968 (age 58); Kingswinford, Staffordshire, England
- Occupations: Television director, Television producer
- Years active: 2001 – present

Paul Barnett (born September 1968, in Kingswinford, Staffordshire, England) is a Television Producer and Director.

== Career ==
After spending his early career creating and directing computer generated imagery sequences, Paul moved on to directing special effects sequences for film and television, before working as a freelance television director and producer for the BBC, ITV, Channel Four and Channel Five.

Since 2002, Paul has directed and produced several high-profile British television documentaries and factual entertainment series.

== Filmography ==
- 'Wrong Car, Right Car' (2002 / 2003)
- 'SAS Survival Secrets' (2003)
- '60 Minute Makeover' (2004)
- 'Shops, Robbers and Videotape' (2005)
- 'To Buy or Not to Buy' (2005)
- 'Coast' (2006 / 2009 / 2010)
- 'Don't Die Young' (2008)
- 'Embarrassing Bodies' (2008 / 2009 / 2010)
- 'Gardeners' World' (2009 / 2011)
- 'Countryfile' (2010)
- 'Our Man in...' (2011)
- 'Supersize vs Superskinny (2012)
- 'Britain's Craziest Christmas Lights' (2013)
- 'Come Dine with Me' (2012 / 2013 / 2014)
- 'Richard Wilson On The Road' (2014)
- 'The Truth About Healthy Eating' (2015)
- 'Sean Conway: On The Edge' (2016)
- 'Robson Green's Coastal Lives' (2017)
