= Montezuma (TV programme) =

- DVD cover
- Genre: Documentary
- Directed by: John Trefor
- Presented by: Dan Snow
- Country of origin: United Kingdom
- Original language: English

Production
- Executive producer: Ludo Graham
- Producer: John Trefor
- Running time: 60 minutes

Original release
- Network: BBC Two
- Release: 19 September 2009

Montezuma is a 2009 BBC Television documentary film in which Dan Snow examines the reign of the Aztec Emperor Moctezuma II.

== Production ==
The film was produced by BBC Wales to tie in with the exhibition Moctezuma: Aztec Ruler at the British Museum.

== Reception ==
=== Reviews ===
Alex Hardy writing in The Times states that, Dan Snow jumps around from moral codes, to superstitions, to food production, to using sacrifice as a weapon of state control as he describes how the Aztec civilisation rose inordinately quickly – in less time than it took the US to become a "world leader", and, asks: was [Montezuma] rather a tragic figure, a victim of circumstance? He concludes that, If the British Museum’s forthcoming exhibition on the Aztec leader... is anything like as intensely packed as this hour-long documentary, then its £12 entrance fee will certainly be fair game.

=== Ratings ===
Broadcast 2009-09-19: 1.1 million viewers (5% audience share).

== Synopsis ==
Dan Snow journeys to the ancient heart of Mexico in search of the lost civilisation of the Aztecs and their last and greatest ruler, Montezuma II (1502–1520). Montezuma inherited an empire of five million people, stretching from present-day Mexico to Nicaragua, from his uncle. His rule was marked by incessant warfare.

Enemy states were growing more powerful and conquered tribes were becoming more rebellious. Within months of taking the throne in 1502, he changed from a man of good reason into a pitiless autocrat who declared himself a god, believing that fear and ruthlessness were the only ways to stop the empire falling apart.

Yet it was at the hands of Cortes and the Spanish conquistadors that Montezuma met his downfall. But what was his relationship with Cortes, and why did such a ruthless leader submit to his captors with such relative ease? As Dan Snow visits the ruins and picks through current excavations, he pieces together the evidence of a gripping story: a divine tragedy of errors, the clash of civilisations, the end of a world - and a very human God.

== Media information ==
=== DVD release ===
Released on Region 2 DVD by BBC DVD on 2009-10-19.
