= Miranda Krestovnikoff =

English TV presenter, natural historian (born 1973)

- Born: Miranda Harper-Jones; 29 January 1973 (age 53); Buckinghamshire, England
- Education: University of Bristol
- Occupations: Television presenter, natural historian, archaeologist
- Employer: BBC
- Television: Coast, The One Show

Miranda Krestovnikoff (born 29 January 1973) is a British radio and television presenter specialising in natural history and archaeological programmes.

== Education ==
Krestovnikoff went to the private Abbey School, Reading, Berkshire, before taking up a place at the University of Bristol to study zoology. While at Bristol worked at the BBC's Natural History Unit.

== Natural history presenter ==
After graduating, Krestovnikoff worked for the BBC and various Bristol-based wildlife production companies to a position of researcher. Her first presenting role was in the Fox Television programme World Gone Wild in 1999.

Since 2000 she has presented programmes about diving. Water Warriors was a Carlton children's production exploring the marine environment. Krestovnikoff then worked as a pet expert in the children's television show SMILE, and on the 2003–04 Channel 4 series Wreck Detectives. Continuing the history/archaeology theme, Krestovnikoff presented the BBC2 series Hidden Treasure.

Krestovnikoff was one of five presenters for the BBC2 series Coast, first broadcast in 2005, which brought her to greater public attention. The coast of Britain and its natural and human history were explored in detail, with Krestovnikoff presenting a natural history segment in each episode. During summer 2005, Krestovnikoff filmed for a BBC2 and Open University production, entitled History Mysteries. She is a regular reporter for The One Show.

Apart from her television work, Krestovnikoff has presented the breakfast programme on BBC Radio 3, writes articles for Diver magazine and engages in public speaking. She sometimes presents the Radio Four programme Tweet of the Day, such as on 11 June 2013, when she presented the programme about the Manx shearwater.

== Charity work ==
Krestovnikoff supports conservation charities including the Wildfowl & Wetlands Trust and Ape Action Africa. In October 2013 she was elected President of the Royal Society for the Protection of Birds,. She is also a Patron of, and qualified Marine Mammal Medic with, British Divers Marine Life Rescue (BDMLR), the UK's leading marine‑mammal rescue charity, providing 24/7 emergency response, training and welfare support for seals, dolphins, porpoises and whales in difficulty around the UK coastline.

== Personal life ==
She married Nicholas Krestovnikoff in 1998 and lives near Bristol with her daughter and son.
