= John Goodall (author) =

British architectural historian (born 1970)

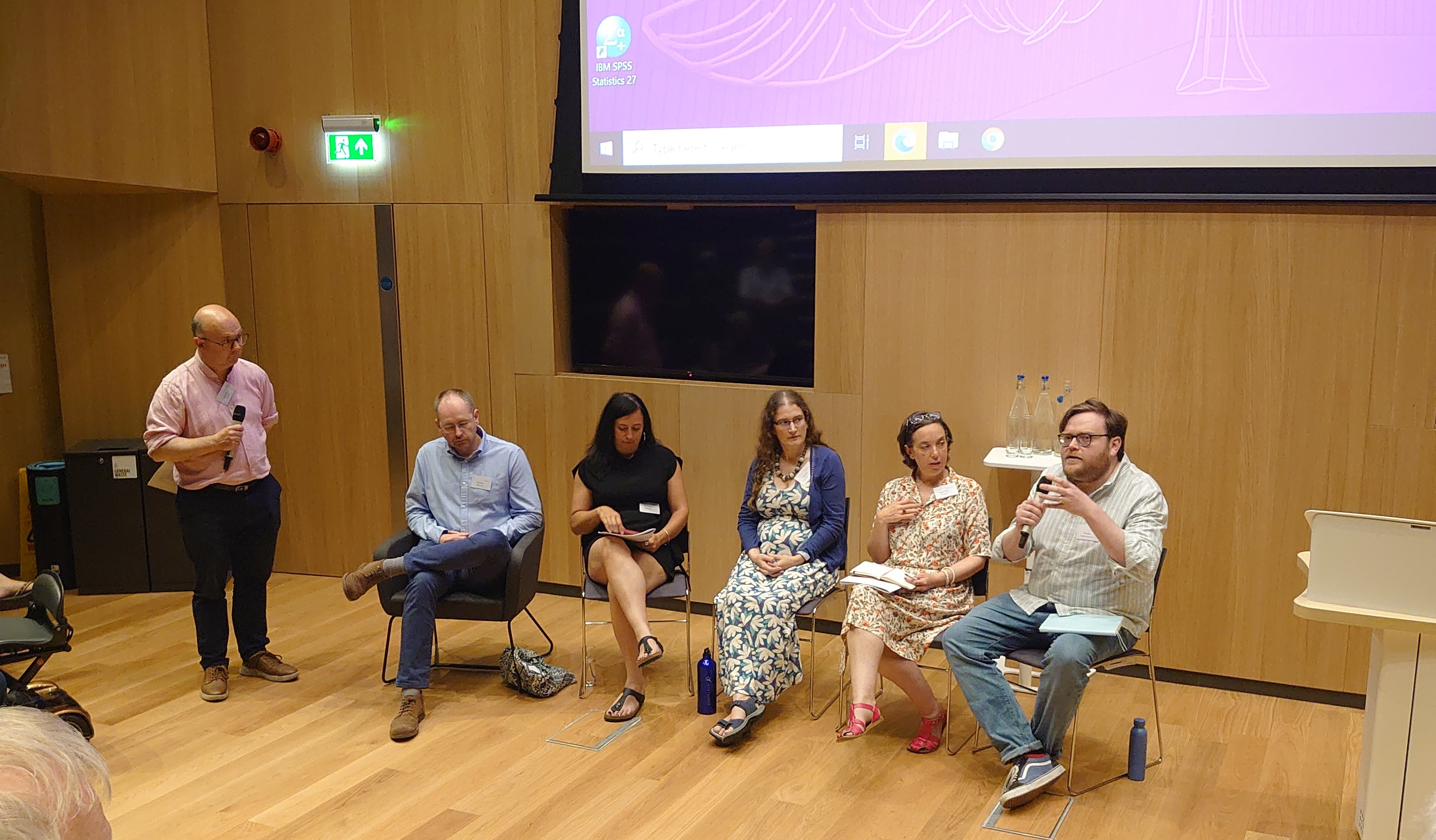
Goodall (left) chairing a panel discussion at a Castle Studies Trust conference in 2023.

John Arthur Annesley Goodall (born 1970) is an English historian, author, and Architectural Editor of Country Life magazine.

== Early life and education ==
Goodall attended St Edward's House at Ampleforth College until 1988, and then read history at Durham University. He subsequently took both an MA and doctorate as an architectural historian at the Courtauld Institute of Art.

== Career ==
Goodall worked for several years as a freelance writer and scholar, publishing his first book in 2001, God's House at Ewelme, which was joint winner of the Royal Historical Society Whitfield Prize for 2001 (presented in 2002).

Goodall has written several guidebooks for both English Heritage and the National Trust. In addition he has contributed to numerous books and scholarly journals on the subject of historic English architecture. In 2003 Goodall joined English Heritage as a senior properties historian. He acted in 2007 as series consultant for the major BBC 1 series How We Built Britain, presented by David Dimbleby.

From November 2007 Goodall became Architectural Editor of Country Life, a magazine to which he had contributed since 1994. He was involved in a debate over the National Trust's presentation of its houses in 2010, speaking on the subject at the Hay Festival and at the National Trust's AGM.

Goodall's second book, The English Castle, was published by Yale University Press in April 2011 on behalf of the Paul Mellon Centre for Studies in British Art. The work received numerous accolades: the 2011 Alice Davis Hitchcock Medallion, the 2011 Large Format Illustrated Book of the Year Award at the Spear's Book Awards, and the 2013 Historians of British Art Book Prize (pre-1800). The work also received the G. T. Clark Prize for 2007–2012, recognising "the most distinguished published contributions to the study of the history and antiquities of Wales and the Marches during the previous quinquennium".

Other recent projects include contributions to the photographic book The English Cathedral by Peter Marlow and a chapter on the siege of Dover in 1216–17 for the book accompanying the Dan Snow Battle Castle television series. He has acted as series consultant for the Country Life book series taken from the archive of the magazine, including Curious Observations (2011) and Letters to the Editor.

On 25 October 2001, Goodall was elected a Fellow of the Society of Antiquaries of London (FSA). He sits on the Fabric Advisory Committees of St. George's Chapel, Windsor Castle and St Albans Cathedral, and is a part-time Humanities staff member at the City and Guilds of London Art School.

Along with Edward Impey, Goodall is a patron of the Castle Studies Trust, a UK registered charity founded in 2012.

== Selected bibliography ==
=== Books ===
- God's House at Ewelme: life, devotion and architecture in a fifteenth-century almshouse (2001) Ashgate, ISBN 978-0-7546-0047-3.
- The English Castle 1066–1650 (2011) London: Paul Mellon Centre for Studies, Yale University Press, ISBN 978-0-300-11058-6.
- Parish Church Treasures. London: Bloomsbury. 2015. ISBN 9781472917638.
- The Castle (2022) London: Yale University Press, ISBN 978-0-300-25190-6

==== Guide books ====
- Pevensey Castle (1999) English Heritage, ISBN 978-1-85074-722-2
- Scarborough Castle (2000) edited by Katy Carter, English Heritage, ISBN 978-1-85074-763-5.
- Bodiam Castle (2001) with Stephen Conlin, National Trust, ISBN 978-1-84359-074-3
- Richmond Castle, Easby Abbey (2001) English Heritage, ISBN 978-1-85074-793-2.
- Whitby Abbey (2003) English Heritage, ISBN 978-1-85074-787-1. [out of print]
- Muchelney Abbey (2004) English Heritage, ISBN 978-1-85074-874-8
- Warkworth Castle and Hermitage (2006) English Heritage, ISBN 978-1-85074-923-3
- Ashby de la Zouch Castle and Kirby Muxloe Castle (2007) English Heritage, ISBN 978-1-905624-19-5
- Portchester Castle (2008) English Heritage, ISBN 978-1-84802-007-8

=== Essays and reporting ===
- Goodall, John (10 September 2014). "Death and childbearing". Parish Church Treasures. Country Life. 208 (37): 76.
- Goodall, John; Richardson, Tim (10 September 2014). "Fulham : a brief guide". Country Life. 208 (37): 104–108.
