= Swing (politics) =

Change in voter support from one election to another

An electoral swing analysis (or swing) shows the extent of change in voter support, typically from one election to another, expressed as a positive or negative percentage. A multi-party swing is an indicator of a change in the electorate's preference between candidates or parties, often between major parties in a two-party system. A swing can be calculated for the electorate as a whole, for a given electoral district or for a particular demographic.

A swing is particularly useful for analysing change in voter support over time, or as a tool for predicting the outcome of elections in constituency-based systems. Swing is also usefully deployed when analysing the shift in voter intentions revealed by (political) opinion polls or to compare polls concisely which may rely on differing samples and on markedly different swings and therefore predict extraneous results.

== Calculation ==
The swing is calculated by comparing the percentage of the vote in a particular election to the percentage of the vote belonging to the same party or candidate at the previous election.

=== One-party swing ===
One-party swing (in percentage points) = Percentage of vote in current election − percentage of vote in previous election

For example, if a party had 41% of the vote in the previous election, and has 51% of the vote in the current election, the swing is 10 percentage points in their favour. This could be reported as +10 points.

=== Two-party swing ===
Two-party swing is calculated by taking the sum of the one-party swings of each party, then dividing by two.

In many nation states' media, including in Australia and the United Kingdom, swing is normally expressed in terms of two parties. This practice is most useful where most governments tend to be from an existing two-party system, and is sometimes used to try to predict the outcome of elections in constituency-based systems where different seats are held with different previous levels of support.

An assumption underlies extrapolated national calculations: that all districts will experience the same swing as shown in a poll or in a place's results. The advantage of this swing is the fact that the loss of support for one party will in most cases be accompanied by smaller or bigger gain in support for the other, but both figures are averaged into one. Employing the two assumptions allows the analyst to compute an electoral pendulum, predicting how many (and which) seats will change hands given a particular swing, and what size uniform swing would therefore bring about a change of government.

== Australia ==
In Australia, the term "swing" refers to the change in the performance of a political party or candidate in an election or opinion poll. As Australia uses the preferential voting system, swing can be expressed in terms of the primary vote (first preference vote), or in terms of the two-party-preferred (TPP) or two-candidate-preferred (TCP) result, which may represent significantly different values due to preference flows; i.e. a 5% primary vote swing does not necessarily represent an equivalent swing in TPP or TCP terms.

== United Kingdom ==
In the UK, a two-party swing (averaged model) is generally used, which adds one party's increase in share of the vote (expressed as a percentage point) to the percentage-point fall of another party, and divides the total by two.

Thus, if Party One's vote rises by 4 points and Party Two's vote falls 5 points, the swing is 4.5 points (Party 2 to Party 1). For disambiguation, suffixes such as: (Con to Lab) (Lab to Lib Dem) (Lib Dem to Con) must be added where three parties stand. Otherwise, a problem when deciding which swing is meant and which swing is best to publish arises where a lower party takes first or second, or where a party loses one of the top two places. (Note: E.g. a Liberal Democrat drops from first to third place and a Conservative Party former runner-up wins to a Labour Party runner-up who was in third place, here three interesting swings are relevant: Lib Dem-Con, Lib Dem-Lab and Lab-Con (and their opposite sign (±) equivalents for the opposite way swings).)

Originating as a mathematical calculation for comparing the results of two constituencies, (Note: Britain, like the US, uses a first-past-the-post voting system and where a new third party or independent candidate has a better or worse result (or stands or chooses not to) this calculation allows for a more understandable comparison between the parties which are of wider interest.) any of these figures can be used as an indication of the scale of voter change between any two political parties, as shown below for the 2010 United Kingdom general election:

Labour to Conservative swing

Liberal Democrat to Conservative swing

Labour to Liberal Democrat swing

== United States ==
Swing in the United States can refer to swing states, those states that are known to shift an outcome between Democrats and Republican parties, equivalent on a local level to marginal seats. By contrast, a non-swing state is the direct equivalent of a safe seat as it rarely changes in outcome. The extent of change in political outcome is heavily influenced by the voting system in use. (Note: As in the UK, the US employs a first-past-the-post voting system as its main voting system.)

== Three party swing or greater ==
Some websites provide a pie chart based or column-based multi party swingometer where ± x%, ± x%, ± x% and so on is displayed or can be input for three parties (or more in more plural democracies). This tool or illustration provides likely outcomes wherever more than two political parties have a significant influence on which politicians are elected. In multiparty systems exit polls frequently include a question as to voting behavior in the last applicable election. Based on those exit polls "voter migration" (where vote gains for a specific party came from and losses of another went to) analyses are published and discussed in election coverage.

== See also ==
- Swing vote
- Swingometer

== Notes and references ==
Notes
