= Thomas Snow (British Army officer) =

British Army general

Lieutenant-General Sir Thomas Snow KCB KCMG
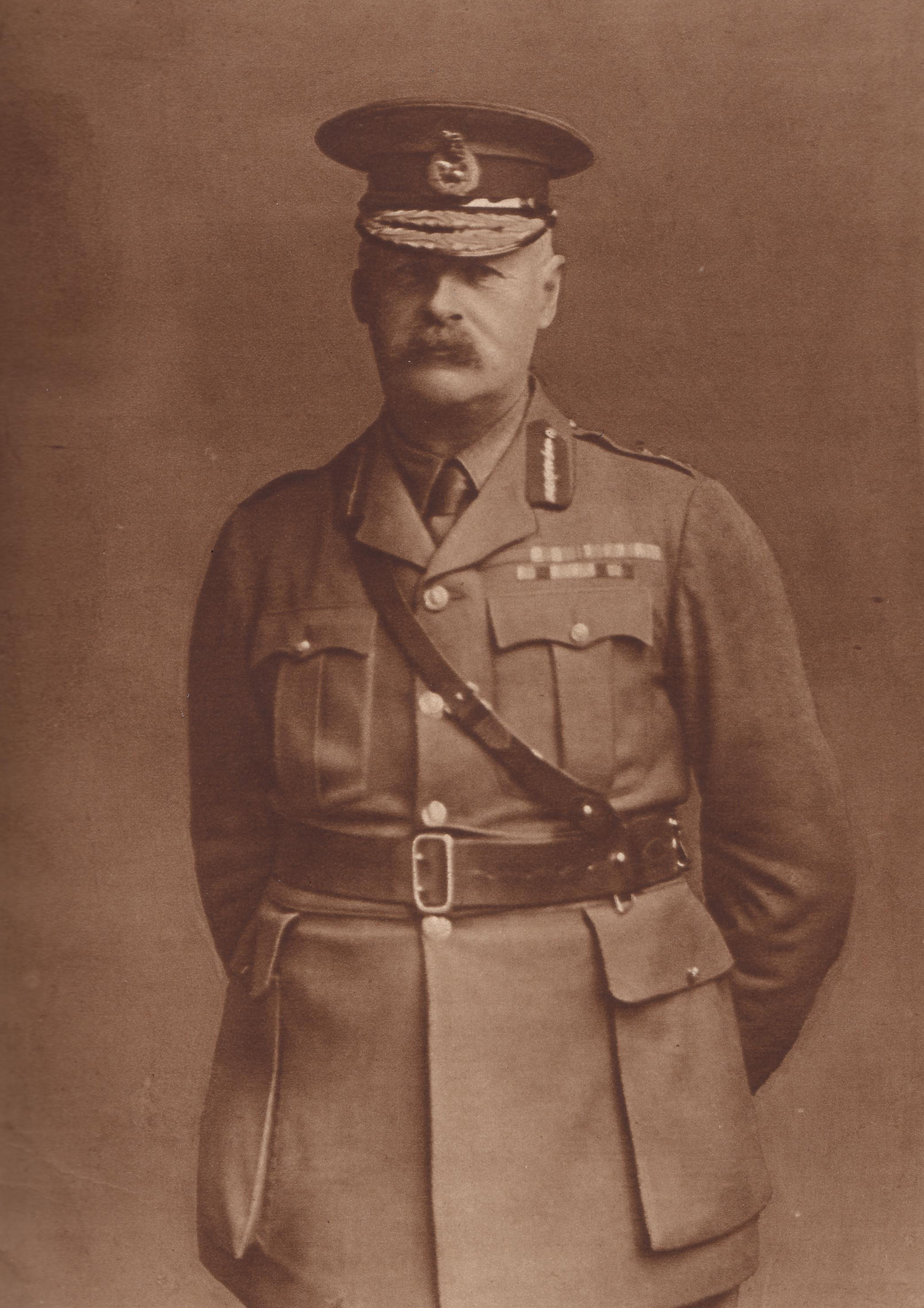
- Born: 5 May 1858; Newton Valence, Hampshire
- Died: 30 August 1940 (aged 82); Kensington Gate, London
- Military career
- Allegiance: United Kingdom
- Branch: British Army
- Service years: 1879–1920
- Rank: Lieutenant-General
- Nicknames: "Slush" "Snowball" "Polar Bear"
- Units: 13th Regiment of Foot; Somerset Light Infantry; Royal Inniskilling Fusiliers
- Commands: Western Command (1918–19); VII Corps (1915–18); 27th Division (1914–15); 4th Division (1911–14)
- Conflicts: Zulu War; Mahdist War; First World War
- Awards: Knight Commander of the Order of the Bath; Knight Commander of the Order of St Michael and St George; Mentioned in Despatches (8); Commander of the Legion of Honour (France); Grand Cordon of the Order of Leopold (Belgium)

Lieutenant-General Sir Thomas D’Oyly Snow, KCB, KCMG (5 May 1858 – 30 August 1940) was a British Army officer who played an important role on the Western Front during the First World War.

Born in 1858 and commissioned in 1879, Snow served in the Anglo-Zulu War and the Mahdist War and was promoted to Major General in 1910. During the First World War, he led the 4th Division during the Great Retreat of 1914, and VII Corps in both its diversionary attack on the Gommecourt Salient on the first day on the Somme in 1916 and at the Battle of Cambrai in 1917.

Snow was relieved from front-line duty on grounds of age in 1918, retired from the British Army in 1919, and died in 1940.

== Early life and military career ==
Snow was born at Newton Valence, Hampshire, on 5 May 1858. He was the eldest son of the Reverend George D'Oyly Snow and his wife Maria Jane Barlow, Snow attended Eton College (1871–1874) and went to St John's College, Cambridge in 1878.

After attending and later graduating from the Royal Military College, Sandhurst, Snow obtained a commission in the 13th Regiment of Foot in 1879, taking part in the Anglo-Zulu War in South Africa the same year. In 1884–1885, having transferred to the Mounted Infantry Regiment of the Camel Corps, Snow fought with them in the Nile Expedition of the Mahdist War at the Battle of Abu Klea and the Battle of El Gubat. He was severely wounded at the latter battle on 19 January 1885.

In 1887, he was promoted to captain and attended the Staff College, Camberley from 1892 to 1893. Snow was promoted in 1895 to brigade major at Aldershot and further in 1897 to major in the Royal Inniskilling Fusiliers. Snow was brigade major for William Gatacre in the Nile campaign of 1898, fighting at the Battle of Atbara and the Siege of Khartoum. He was twice Mentioned in Despatches for his services in the Sudan.

Snow was promoted to brevet lieutenant colonel, and in April 1899 he became a major and the second-in-command of the 2nd Battalion, Northamptonshire Regiment, and was posted to India, causing him to miss out on service in the Second Boer War. In March 1903, he was promoted to substantive lieutenant colonel and returned home, so never actually commanded a battalion of his own. In June 1903 he was promoted to colonel and appointed assistant quartermaster-general of the 4th Corps (which later became Eastern Command). He stayed there, being promoted to assistant adjutant general (1905), brigadier general, general staff (1906), and in October 1909 succeeded Major General Frederick Robb as commander of the 11th Infantry Brigade. He had been appointed a Companion of the Order of the Bath in the 1907 Birthday Honours.

Snow was then promoted to major-general in March 1910 and became the general officer commanding (GOC) of the 4th Division, then serving in Eastern Command, in May 1911. In 1912, as GOC of the 4th Division, Snow took part in the Army Manoeuvres of 1912, the last major manoeuvres before the First World War, as part of the 'Blue Force' under Lieutenant General Sir James Grierson which gained a clear 'victory' over the 'Red Force' of Lieutenant General Sir Douglas Haig. According to James Edmonds, who served under Snow as the 4th Division's GSO1 his only practice at division command was three or four days at army manoeuvres, which were not practical as General Sir Charles Douglas, the Chief of the Imperial General Staff (CIGS) from April 1914, had forbidden retreats to be practised. However, he also concentrated on making junior officers critique one another's performance, and on night moves, march discipline and concealment from the air. He drew up Standing Orders for War, which were used by other divisions in 1914.

== First World War ==
=== 1914 ===
At the outbreak of the First World War in August 1914, Snow commanded the 4th Division, initially deployed for home defence on the east coast with its headquarters in Suffolk. "Although Snow had written Eastern Command's Defence Scheme years earlier as a staff officer, he recalled that very few people knew, or cared, that such a scheme existed and the chaos on the East Coast was appalling".

When the division arrived at the front (25 August) Snow's orders were to help prepare a defensive position on the Cambrai-Le Cateau position, as General Headquarters (GHQ) had no idea of the seriousness of the situation facing II Corps (this being at a time when I and II Corps were retreating on opposite sides of the Forest of Mormal, and the British Expeditionary Force's Chief of Staff, Archibald Murray, was about to collapse from strain and overwork). Snow was in time to take part in the Battle of Le Cateau. The 4th Division covered the left flank of II Corps and he was one of those who urged Smith-Dorrien to stand and fight. The diary of Lieutenant-General Horace Smith-Dorrien, the GOC of II Corps, recorded:

I learned in the course of the morning that the 4th Division (General Snow, now Lieutenant-General Sir Thomas D'Oyly Snow) had reached Le Cateau from England, and was delighted to hear that the Chief [that is, Field Marshal Sir John French, commanding the BEF] had immediately pushed it out to Solesmes, about seven miles north-west of Le Cateau, to cover the retirement of the Cavalry and 3rd Division.

Snow's division retired after the battle but GHQ and the French were left with an exaggerated impression of the losses suffered at Le Cateau. Henry Hughes Wilson, BEF Sub Chief of Staff, issued the infamous "sauve qui peut" order (27 August), (addressed from "Henry to Snowball") ordering Snow to dump unnecessary ammunition and officers' kits so that tired and wounded soldiers could be carried. Smith-Dorrien was later rebuked by Field Marshal French for countermanding the order. Snow later wrote "the retreat of 1914 was not, as is now imagined, a great military achievement, but rather a badly bungled affair only prevented from being a disaster of the first magnitude by the grit displayed by the officers and the men".

Brigadier-General Aylmer Haldane, who commanded the 10th Brigade under Snow in 1914, was highly critical of him, although he also thought many other officers of the division not up to the standards of competence required in war. By September 1914 three out of four battalion COs had been "sent home" and Snow was lucky to retain his command. Snow later revisited some places from the Great Retreat from Mons with Haldane, who recorded in his diary on 10 November 1917: "Though he is an old friend of mine I have never felt the same towards him since that time ... when he showed what a poor spirited man he was when troublous times were upon us".

In September, during the First Battle of the Marne, Snow was hospitalised, badly injured with a cracked pelvis, after his horse fell and rolled on him. In November, after partially recovering (he required further treatment for the rest of the war), he took command of the 27th Division, then being raised at Winchester for deployment to the front at the end of the year. The division consisted of regulars returning from overseas.

=== 1915 ===
The 27th Division was initially trenched at St. Eloi before relieving a French division in the Ypres Salient. During Second Battle of Ypres in April 1915, Snow's was at first the only unit with HQ east of Ypres. He led his division through the first German poison gas attack. His performance resulted in his appointment as a Knight Commander of the Order of the Bath in June 1915.

In June, Major General Lambton, the British commander in chief's Military Secretary, wrote to King George V recommending Lieutenant Generals Julian Byng, Snow and Edwin Alderson, as candidates for command of the proposed Canadian Corps. Alderson, the commander of the 1st Canadian Division, was appointed to command the Canadian Corps and on 15 July, Snow, promoted to the temporary rank of lieutenant-general, became general officer commanding (GOC) of VII Corps.

=== 1916 ===
VII Corps delivered an attack upon the German-held trench fortress of the Gommecourt salient on 1 July 1916, as a part of the opening of the Battle of the Somme offensive. The object was to pinch off the salient and beat off counter-attacks, whilst also serving as a diversion from the main offensive further south. Snow did not think Gommecourt a good place for a feint and protested to the Third Army HQ but GHQ insisted the attack go ahead. Edmonds later wrote that Snow was more scared of Haig and of Allenby, his army commander, than he was of the enemy.

A senior officer of the 46th (North Midland) Division later wrote that Snow "had purposely taken no care" to keep preparations secret. He was hampered by the fact that most of the German artillery was hidden behind Gommecourt Wood, out of range of all but the heaviest British guns, whilst there was insufficient British artillery (sixteen 18-pounder field guns and four 4.5 howitzers per brigade). The 56th (1/1st London) Division captured the German first trench system on the south side of the German salient before being beaten back. The 46th Division's attack, on the northern side, failed. The latter failure was blamed on Edward James Montagu-Stuart-Wortley, GOC 46th Division, who was later sacked – although there was a consensus that he was a poor general, he may also have been something of a scapegoat to protect Snow (or even the Army commander, Allenby), as competent senior commanders were in short supply and corps commanders were seldom sacked at this stage of the war. After the war Snow wrote that the Gommecourt salient had proven stronger than anticipated.

=== 1917 ===
In 1917 Snow took part in the offensives at the Battle of Arras in the spring (his corps fought on the right, or southern, flank of Lieutenant General Sir Julian Byng's Third Army) and the Battle of Cambrai in November. At Cambrai VII Corps were on the right flank and at one point it was suggested that they might be placed under French command if the French joined in the offensive. This did not happen.

Despite being in pain from his injured pelvis, Snow surveyed his positions from Ronssoy-Epehy Ridge each day and warned his superiors that a German counter-attack was brewing for 29 or 30 November. They were still preoccupied with the attack at Bourlon Wood on the left and did not believe – wrongly – that the Germans had sufficient reserves left after the recent Battle of Passchendaele to mount a big attack. At 7:00 p.m. on 28 November his chief of staff, Brigadier-General John Burnett-Stuart, telephoned Byng's chief of staff, Major-General Louis Vaughan, to request reinforcements and was told that the Guards Division could soon be sent. When the counter-attack came, the Guards Division had already been committed to III Corps.

Bryn Hammond describes Snow at Cambrai as a "safe pair of hands" on account of his experience but also "tired and relatively old" at the age of 59. After criticism of British leadership during the German counter-attack, and along with several other BEF corps commanders, he was replaced largely on grounds of age on 2 January 1918. He returned to England, being appointed General Officer Commanding-in-Chief for Western Command. He was promoted to substantive lieutenant general and appointed a Knight Commander of the Order of St Michael and St George in recognition of his services on the Western Front. He had also been mentioned in dispatches six times, appointed a Commander of the Legion of Honour by the French Government and made a Grand Cross of the Order of Leopold from Belgium.

== Post-war life ==
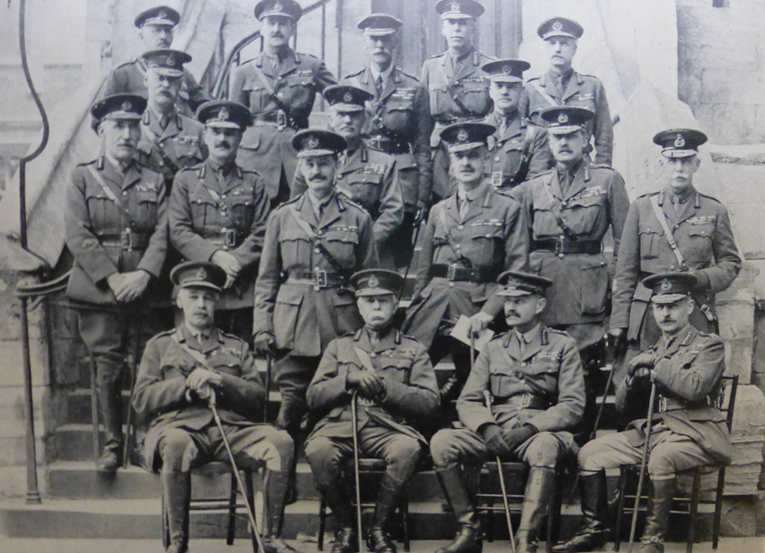
Eighteen Old Etonian generals revisit Eton, May 1919. Lieutenant General Snow is stood in the middle row, second from the left.

Snow retired from the army in September 1919. He was also colonel of the Suffolk Regiment from 1918 to 1919 and colonel of the Somerset Light Infantry from 1919 to 1929. Snow became largely confined to a bath chair and moved from Blandford to Kensington. He devoted much of his time to charitable work and became chairman of the Crippled Boys' Home for Training. Snow died at his home in Kensington Gate, London, on 30 August 1940, aged 82. His wealth was £15,531.95 (equivalent to £800,000 in 2025).

== Personal life and descendants ==
Snow was 6 ft 4 in (1.93 m) in height. Snow married Charlotte Geraldine, second daughter of Major-General John Talbot Coke of Trusley, Derbyshire, on 12 January 1897. They had two sons and one daughter. His son George D'Oyly Snow became the Bishop of Whitby. Snow was the grandfather of British broadcasters Peter Snow and Jon Snow (who writes about him in the foreword to Ronald Skirth's war memoir The Reluctant Tommy) and great-grandfather of historian and TV presenter, Dan Snow.

== Books ==
- Beckett, Dr Ian F.; Corvi, Steven J., eds. (2006). Haig's Generals. London: Pen & Sword. ISBN 978-1-84415-892-8.
- Hammond, Bryn (2008). Cambrai, The Myth of the First Great Tank Battle. London: Weidenfeld & Nicolson. ISBN 978-0-7538-2605-8.
- "Snow, Sir Thomas D'Oyly". Oxford Dictionary of National Biography (online ed.). Oxford University Press. doi:10.1093/ref:odnb/36180. (Subscription, Wikipedia Library access or UK public library membership required.)
- Simpson, Andy (2006). Directing Operations: British Corps Command on the Western Front 1914–18. Stroud: Spellmount. ISBN 1-86227-292-1.
- Snow, Dan; Pottle, Mark, eds. (2011). The Confusion of Command, The War Memoirs of Lieutenant General Sir Thomas D'Oyly Snow, 1914–1915. London: Frontline Books. ISBN 978-1-84832-575-3.
- Terraine, John (1960). Mons, The Retreat to Victory. Wordsworth Military Library, London. ISBN 978-1-84022-240-1.
- Travers, Tim (1987). The Killing Ground. Allen & Unwin. ISBN 0-85052-964-6.

Military offices
Preceded by Herbert Belfield	GOC 4th Division; 1911−1914	Succeeded by Henry Rawlinson
New command	GOC 27th Division; 1914–1915	Succeeded by George Milne
New command	GOC VII Corps; 1915–1918	Succeeded by Walter Congreve
Preceded by Sir William Campbell	GOC-in-C Western Command; 1918–1919	Succeeded by Sir Beauvoir De Lisle
Honorary titles
Preceded by Sir Alfred Codrington	Colonel of the Suffolk Regiment; 1918–1919	Succeeded by Sir Thomas Morland
