= Battlefield Britain =

- Genre: Documentary
- Presented by: Peter & Dan Snow
- Country of origin: United Kingdom
- Original language: English
- No. of series: 1
- No. of episodes: 8

Production
- Executive producer: Jane Aldous
- Running time: 60 minutes

Original release
- Network: BBC Two
- Release: 6 August – 24 September 2004

Related
- 20th Century Battlefields

Battlefield Britain is a 2004 BBC television documentary series about famous battles in British history. The 8 part series covers battles from Boudicca's rebellion against the Romans in 60AD to the Battle of Britain in 1940 it also covers the impact and implications the battles had on the future of the British isles.

The series is presented by father and son team Peter and Dan Snow. Peter explains the battle plans, topography of the battleground and the actions of the generals while Dan visits the sites to give the real-life perspective of the servicemen on the ground.

The episodes also feature re-enactments of key phases of the battles, a computer-generated bird's-eye view of the battleground to show the topography and troop movements.

== Production ==
Dan Snow said there was never any plan for his father and him to work together. it happened after someone at the BBC saw Dan's video diary of the Oxford and Cambridge boat race in 2000. Peter Snow was then offered the chance to do a history series with his son, an idea he initially rejected. Dan talked him round and they filmed a pilot episode. Dan has stated that he didn't find the work easy.

I was very wooden and I had to go on a steep learning curve. In the process I developed a huge respect for Dad's ability to explain really complex things in simple language, without ever dumbing anything down.

— Dan Snow

== Media information ==
A companion radio show Battlefield Ramblings was broadcast weekly on BBC Radio 4 to accompany the series. Each week a guest would join the presenter Muriel Gray for a walk in areas linked to the people and events featured in the TV show. The first episode was broadcast from Boudicca's Way in Norfolk with guests Dan and Peter Snow who argued constantly during the programme.

In Australia, all eight episodes aired on SBS TV in its As It Happened history timeslot each Saturday at 7:30pm from 22 January until 12 March 2005.

=== Companion book ===
- Snow, Peter & Dan (29 July 2004). Battlefield Britain. BBC Books. ISBN 978-0-563-48789-0.

=== DVD release ===
- Battlefield Britain: The Complete Series (3-disc box-set), Region 1 (NTSC) and Region 2 (PAL), BBC Worldwide, 23 October 2006

=== Online game ===
A popular online game Battlefield Academy was created by Solaris Media (now Playniac) to accompany the series. The game features four historical scenarios based on episodes from the series and was produced with Dan Snow, Matthew Bennett from Sandhurst and the BBC History team.

== Episode listing ==
No.	Title	Original release date	UK viewers (millions)
1	"Boudicca's Revolt"	6 August 2004	2.55
The uprising led by Queen Boudicca against Roman rule in Britain in 60AD.
2	"Hastings"	13 August 2004	N/A
The Battle of Hastings in 1066.
3	"The Battle for Wales"	20 August 2004	1.98
The Battle for Wales in 1403.
4	"The Battle Against the Spanish Armada"	27 August 2004	2.28
The defeat of the Spanish Armada in 1588.
5	"The Battle of Naseby"	3 September 2004	1.92
The Battle of Naseby in 1645.
6	"The Battle of the Boyne"	10 September 2004	2.39
The Battle of the Boyne in 1690.
7	"Culloden"	17 September 2004	2.26
The Battle of Culloden in 1746.
8	"The Battle of Britain"	24 September 2004	3.00
The Battle of Britain in 1940.

== Reception ==
The series won Best Visual Effects at the BAFTA craft awards in 2004. And a Welsh BAFTA award for Best Sound in 2005.

== See also ==
- 20th Century Battlefields
