= Peter Snow =

British television presenter (born 1938)

Peter Snow CBE
- Snow in 2009
- Born: Peter John Snow; 20 April 1938 (age 88); Dublin, Ireland
- Education: Balliol College, Oxford
- Occupations: Television journalist; radio broadcaster; historian
- Years active: 1962–present
- Known for: Swingometer
- Television: ITN defence and diplomatic correspondent (1966–1979); ITN general election programmes (1966–1979); Newsnight (1980–1997); BBC general election programmes (1983–2005); Tomorrow's World (1997–2000)
- Spouses: Alison Carter (m. 1964; div. 1973); Ann MacMillan (m. 1976)
- Children: 6; including Dan

Peter John Snow CBE (born 20 April 1938) is a British radio and television presenter and historian. Between 1969 and 2005, he was an analyst of general election results, first on ITV and later for the BBC. He presented Newsnight from its launch in 1980 until 1997. He has presented a number of documentaries, including some with his son, Dan Snow.

== Early life ==
Snow was born in Dublin, the son of John FitzGerald Snow and Margaret Mary Pringle. He is the grandson of First World War general Sir Thomas D'Oyly Snow; first cousin of Jon Snow, the presenter of Channel 4 News from 1989 to 2021; nephew of schoolmaster and bishop George D'Oyly Snow; and brother-in-law of historian-writer Margaret MacMillan. He is the father of fellow TV presenter Dan Snow.

Snow spent part of his early childhood in Benghazi, Libya, where his father was stationed. His father became deputy Fortress commander at Gibraltar in 1956.

== Education ==
Snow was educated at Wellington College, an independent school in the village of Crowthorne in Berkshire, and subsequently studied Greats at Balliol College, Oxford, where he was taught by classicist and ancient historian Russell Meiggs and moral philosopher R. M. Hare. From 1956 to 1958 he did National Service as a junior officer in the Somerset Light Infantry, serving in Plymouth and Warminster.

== Life and career ==
Snow was a foreign correspondent, Defence and Diplomatic Correspondent, and occasional newscaster for Britain's Independent Television News (ITN). He also appeared as an election analyst and co-presenter of ITN's General Election programmes throughout the late 1960s and 1970s. He joined the organisation in 1962. He gained a much higher profile after he was recruited in 1979 to be the main presenter of the new late evening BBC 2 in-depth news programme Newsnight, which began almost a year later than planned, in January 1980. He left Newsnight in 1997 and presented Tomorrow's World (with Philippa Forrester) and the BBC Radio 4 quizzes Masterteam and Brain of Britain, amongst other projects. At the Royal Television Society in 1998, Snow won the Judges' Award for services to broadcasting.

Snow has been involved as an election analyst and co-presenter in the live General Election results programmes for many years, first at ITN for five General Elections (1966–1979) and later at the BBC for a further six (1983–2005). He presented in-depth statistical analyses of the election results at both ITN and the BBC, and at the BBC took over responsibility for this in 1983, following the death of Robert McKenzie, and became largely associated with McKenzie's BBC "Swingometer" when it was reinstated in 1992. In his presenting, he often made use of props and graphics. During the Falklands War in 1982 and the First Gulf War in early 1991, he used a sandpit to illustrate the progress of the combat. In 1994, he parodied his election role by providing analysis of the entries for the Eurovision Song Contest in the BBC's two contest preview shows ahead of the final in Dublin. His data analysis predicted that either France or the United Kingdom would win. They finished seventh and tenth respectively.

Snow survived a plane crash at Port Blakely, Bainbridge Island, Washington, on 1 October 1999 when the de Havilland Canada DHC-2 Beaver, registration number N9766Z, in which he was a passenger hit trees during a film project for the BBC.

Along with his son, Dan, Snow presented Battleplan: El Alamein for the BBC in October 2002 to celebrate the 60th anniversary of the allied defeat of Rommel's Afrika Korps. They then went on in 2004 to make the eight-part BBC series Battlefield Britain, covering battles on British soil from Boudicca's struggle with the Romans to the Battle of Britain. They demonstrated the hardships that the much smaller soldiers must have faced (Peter is 6'5" and Dan is 6'6"). They reunited to host 20th Century Battlefields for BBC 2 and the Military Channel in 2006. This covered battles all around the world from the Battle of Amiens in the First World War in 1918 to the Gulf War of 1990–1, and was presented in similar fashion to the first Battlefield Britain. Peter and Dan Snow authored BBC books with the same titles to coincide with the TV shows.

Peter and Dan Snow also presented "Whose Britain is it anyway?", a survey of the ownership of Britain's countryside, in 2006, "What makes Britain rich?" in early 2007 and "What Britain earns" in 2008. Peter and Dan have also made two history series for BBC Radio Four on the Black Prince, on Wellington's Peninsular War, and the story of the Royal Flying Corps. He also presented "Random Edition" over a number of years, a Radio Four programme that examined in detail the stories in a newspaper chosen at random from one day in history.

On 6 October 2005, the BBC announced that Snow would cease working on election broadcasts. Snow said "I shall be over 70 at the next general election and that, frankly, is a bit old to be dancing around in front of huge graphic displays." In July 2006, Snow presented "Pompeii Live" for Channel 5, a live outside broadcast telling the story of the Roman towns of Pompeii and Herculaneum. In January 2008, while presenting What Britain Earns, a BBC programme about salaries in the UK alongside his son, Snow admitted to earning around £100,000 a year. In the summer of 2008, Peter presented a six part series for Channel 5, "Brits who Made the Modern World", a celebration of great twentieth century British engineers and inventors. In August 2008, Snow appeared in the reality TV talent show-themed television series, Maestro on BBC Two.

In July 2009, to coincide with the 40th anniversary of the NASA Moon landings, ITN produced five special 10-minute programmes for ITV titled Mission to the Moon – News from 1969. Snow participated in these programmes, acting as a correspondent alongside former ITN colleague John Suchet, the presenter of the specials. Snow also presented a special on BBC Radio 4 focusing on Britain's First Day of War in 1939. In June 2013, Snow presented D-Day As it Happens for Channel 4.

In July 2016, Snow presented Trainspotting Live – a three part television series about trains and trainspotting on BBC Four. In June 2018 Peter presented a five-part series for Channel Four Great Train Restorations which created a so-called Time Train from four refurbished railway carriages. In July 2019 Peter presented Planespotting Live for BBC4 with co-presenter Andi Peters.

== Books ==
Snow has written a number of books besides the ones written with his son, Dan. In 1970, he wrote Leila's Hijack War with a journalist colleague, David Phillips, telling the story of the international crisis that was caused by Palestinian guerrillas, including Leila Khaled, who hijacked three airliners and blew them up on a desert airstrip. In 1972, he wrote Hussein, the biography of King Hussein of Jordan. In 2010, he published To War with Wellington, the story of the Iron Duke's campaigns from Portugal to Waterloo. In 2013, he published When Britain burned the White House, the story of the 1814 British invasion of Washington.

In 2015, he published The Battle of Waterloo Experience with his son Dan on the occasion of the bicentenary of the Battle of Waterloo in June 1815. In 2016, they went on to write Treasures of British History, The Nation's History told through its 50 Most Important Documents.

In 2017, Peter and his wife, Ann MacMillan of the Canadian Broadcasting Corporation (CBC), wrote War Stories, Gripping Tales of Courage, Cunning and Compassion, which was published by John Murray. In 2020, Peter and Ann wrote Treasures of World History, the Story of Civilisation in 50 documents published by Welbeck. In 2022 they wrote – also published by Welbeck – Kings and Queens, the real lives of the English Monarchs.

== Personal life ==
Snow has been married twice, and has six children from three relationships. His eldest son, French citizen Matthieu, was born before his first marriage, although Snow was not aware of his existence until he was an adult. He married Alison Carter in 1964 and the couple had a son (Shane) and a daughter (Shuna). They divorced nine years later.

In 1976 Snow married Ann MacMillan (of the Canadian Broadcasting Corporation since 1981), with whom he has a son, Dan (who is married to Lady Edwina Grosvenor, daughter of the 6th Duke of Westminster), and two daughters, Rebecca and Kate. His second wife and sister-in-law are great-granddaughters of former British Prime Minister David Lloyd George.

Snow was appointed Commander of the Order of the British Empire (CBE) in the 2006 New Year Honours for his services to Broadcasting. His hobbies include model railways, and he has an OO gauge layout installed in his loft. In August 2014, Snow was one of 200 public figures who were signatories to a letter to The Guardian expressing their hope that Scotland would vote to remain part of the United Kingdom in September's referendum on that issue.

He is the cousin of fellow journalist and broadcaster Jon Snow.

== Works ==
- Peter Snow and David Philips, Leila's Hijack War. Pan Books, 1970, ISBN 0-330-02810-3
- Peter Snow, Hussein, a Biography. Barrie and Jenkins, 1972, ISBN 0-214-65426-5
- Peter Snow, Dan Snow, Battlefield Britain: From Boudicca to the Battle of Britain, ISBN 978-0-563-48789-0
- Peter Snow; Dan Snow (2007). 20th Century Battlefields. Ebury Publishing. ISBN 978-1-4481-4059-6.
- Peter Snow To War with Wellington: From the Peninsula to Waterloo, John Murray, 2010, ISBN 978-1-84854-103-0
- Peter Snow When Britain Burned the White House: The 1814 Invasion of Washington. John Murray, London; St. Martin's Press, U.S., 2013, ISBN 978-1-4668-4894-8
- Peter Snow and Dan Snow, The Battle of Waterloo Experience, Andre Deutsch, 2015, ISBN 978-0-233-00447-1
- Peter Snow and Dan Snow, Treasures of British History, The Nation's History Told Through Its 50 Most Important Documents. Andre Deutsch, 2016 ISBN 978-0-233-00218-7
- Peter Snow and Ann MacMillan, War Stories, Gripping Tales of Courage, Cunning and Compassion. John Murray 2017 ISBN 978-1-47361-829-9
- Peter Snow and Ann MacMillan, Treasures of World History, The Story of Civilisation in 50 Documents. Welbeck 2020 ISBN 978-0-23300-604-8.
- Peter Snow and Ann MacMillan, Kings and Queens, The Real Lives of the English Monarchs. Welbeck 2022 ISBN 978-1-80279-003-0.
