= Charles Gosling =

Brigadier-General Charles Gosling CMG
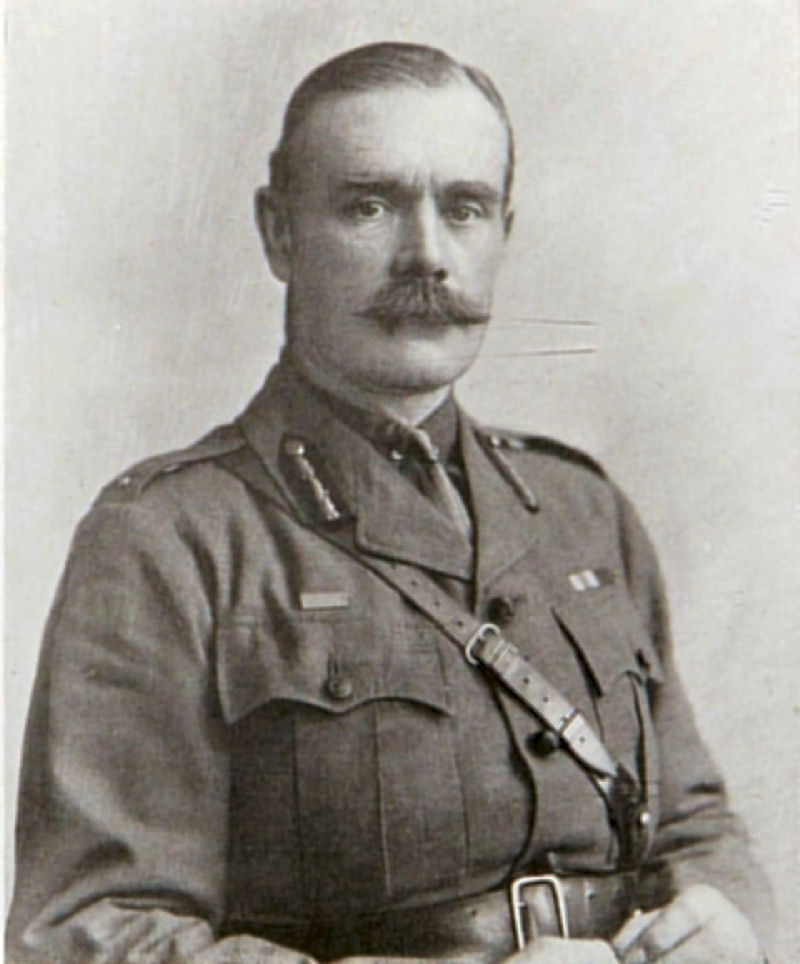
- Born: June 1868; Offley, Hertfordshire, England
- Died: 12 April 1917 (aged 48); Arras, France

Brigadier-General Charles Gosling, CMG (June 1868 – 12 April 1917) was a British Army officer. He was killed in action during the Second Battle of Arras in 1917, while in command of the 10th Brigade.

== Military career ==
Charles Gosling, born in Offley, Hertfordshire, in June 1868, was educated at Eton College.

His military career began in August 1888 when, after having attended the Royal Military College, Sandhurst, he was commissioned as a second lieutenant into the Royal Irish Rifles (later the Royal Ulster Rifles). He was not with his regiment for long, however, before transferring over to the King's Royal Rifle Corps (KRRC) in November. He was promoted to lieutenant in February 1891 and captain in 1897.

On 18 March 1912 Gosling was promoted to lieutenant colonel and became commanding officer (CO) of the 3rd Battalion of his own regiment, the KRRC, then serving in India.

Almost two years later, after the British entry into World War I in the summer of 1914, he led the battalion to the Western Front. He remained in command until February 1915 when he was wounded during the attack on St Eloi.

His wound must have healed relatively quickly as he returned to the Western Front in May. On 23 July he took command of the 7th Infantry Brigade, taking over from Colin Robert Ballard, and was granted the temporary rank of brigadier general whilst employed in this role. He commanded the brigade until he was again wounded in battle, this time severely, in May 1916, four months after being advanced to brevet colonel. Later in the year he was awarded the CMG, "for services rendered in connection with Military Operations in the Field", while his permanent rank was progressed to colonel back in March.

In December 1916 he again returned to France and, after again being promoted to temporary brigadier general, was given another brigade to command, this time the 10th, part of the 4th Division. This was a post he would hold until 12 April 1917 when, his luck having by now run out, he was killed during the Battle of Arras, as was his brigade major, Captain Fellowes, who was killed by an enemy sniper, while Gosling himself "was killed by a shell. They are buried side by side in the Hervin Farm British Cemetery, St. Laurent-Blagny, France".

== See also ==
- List of generals of the British Empire who died during the First World War

== Bibliography ==
- Davies, Frank; Maddocks, Graham (2014) [1995]. Bloody Red Tabs: General Officer Casualties of the Great War 1914–1918. Leo Cooper. ISBN 978-1-78346-237-7.
