= Operation Grand Canyon with Dan Snow =

- Genre: Factual
- Directed by: Ben Duncan; Martin Johnson
- Presented by: Dan Snow
- Country of origin: United Kingdom
- Original language: English
- No. of series: 1
- No. of episodes: 2

Production
- Producers: Ben Duncan; Martin Johnson
- Running time: 60 minutes

Original release
- Network: BBC Two; BBC Two HD
- Release: 5 January – 12 January 2014

Operation Grand Canyon with Dan Snow is a British factual television series first broadcast on BBC Two on 5 January 2014. The two-part series was presented by Dan Snow.

== Production ==
The series will be distributed by BBC Worldwide and is a BBC and Discovery Channel co-production.

== Reception ==
Sam Wollaston of The Guardian wasn't convinced the series deserved two episodes. The Sentinel said "the experience should have been the blueprint for I'm A Celebrity".
