= 20th Century Battlefields =

- Genre: Documentary
- Presented by: Peter Snow; Dan Snow
- Country of origin: United Kingdom
- Original language: English
- No. of seasons: 1
- No. of episodes: 8

Production
- Executive producer: Danielle Peck
- Producer: Ben Lawrie
- Running time: 60 minutes

Original release
- Network: BBC Two
- Release: 4 June – 23 July 2007

20th Century Battlefields is a BBC documentary television series hosted by television and radio personality Peter Snow, and his son Dan Snow.

Episodes cover the major battles of the twentieth century, and is best known for its extensive use of "sand table" (often called the "mapcase" in both series) CGI effects to help viewers visualize the battles.

== Production ==
Dan Snow has admitted that during the production he bickered with his father about the significance of certain battles such as the Spanish Armada at Gravelines and who won the Yom Kippur War. He also expressed concern over his father's health during filming in the Middle East when his father was becoming tired and run down from not drinking enough water.

== Episode list ==
=== Episode 1: 1918 Western Front ===
Covers the Battle of Amiens, and in particular the innovative tactics invented, most notably the close coordination of infantry, tanks and aircraft which characterises modern battles shown by the British commander Douglas Haig, as well as basic infiltration tactics. Peter and Dan Snow observe a combined-arms exercise.

=== Episode 2: 1942 Midway ===
Covers the War in the Pacific from the Attack on Pearl Harbor and the Battle of the Coral Sea and then in more detail on the Battle of Midway. The episode also focuses on the rise of the aircraft carrier in World War II. Dan Snow takes part in a training exercise with the Royal Navy where they tackle a simulated engine room fire.

=== Episode 3: 1942 Stalingrad ===
Covers the Eastern Front briefly up to the Battle of Stalingrad and then describes the battle in detail from the initial attacks on the city to the surrounding and eventual destruction of the German 6th Army. Focuses in particular on urban warfare tactics employed, especially snipers. Dan Snow spends some time with the British Army Snipers to illustrate the power of the sniper, targeting a command post occupied by Peter Snow. Dan succeeds in 'assassinating' his father.

=== Episode 4: 1951 Korea ===
Covers the entire Korean War from the initial invasion by North Korea until the final ceasefire (but not peace treaty, as it is shown the two nations are still technically at war) after Chinese involvement. Focuses in particular on the retaking of Seoul and then the Battle of the Imjin River as the main fight shown. Peter and Dan experience the power of artillery.

=== Episode 5: 1968 Vietnam ===
Covers the Tet Offensive, in particular the fighting at Saigon and Khe Sanh, but the main focus is on the Battle of Hue. Dan Snow participates in training for urban assault.

=== Episode 6: 1973 Middle East ===
Covers the Yom Kippur War from start to finish concentrating on both the Syrian and Egyptian fronts. It also briefly covers the six day war of 1967, in which Israel launched a preemptive strike against Syria, Jordan and Egypt. Does not cover one engagement primarily, other than a slight focus on the Battle of Chinese Farm near the Suez Canal. The Palestinian struggle for statehood is heavily emphasized. The episode is filmed in the Negev Desert in Southern Israel, since neither Egypt nor Syria gave permission to film in their countries. Dan Snow learns how to operate an anti-tank missile.

=== Episode 7: 1982 Falklands ===
Covers the Falklands War from start to finish. Beginning with the invasion of the island, it then details all major engagements of the conflict from the sinking of General Belgrano, the sinking of HMS Sheffield, the British landing on the Falklands, Battle of Goose Green, and finally the battle for Stanley. Dan Snow practices night fighting with the British Army.

=== Episode 8: 1991 Gulf War ===
Covers the First Gulf War from start to finish. Beginning with the invasion and occupation of Kuwait the episode then details the retaking of the country by the UN coalition. It covers in most detail the air campaign (noting the changes in tactics to respond to international pressure) and then the ground attack. No individual engagement is given priority, though an amount of time is given to non-combat events, such as the burning of oil wells and SCUD attacks on Tel-Aviv. Dan Snow experiences operating in gas masks.

== See also ==
- Battlefield Britain
