= Mackerras pendulum =

The Mackerras pendulum was devised by the Australian psephologist Malcolm Mackerras as a way of predicting the outcome of an election contested between two major parties in a Westminster style lower house legislature such as the Australian House of Representatives, which is composed of single-member electorates and which uses a preferential voting system such as a Condorcet method or IRV.

The pendulum works by lining up all of the seats held in Parliament for the government, the opposition and the crossbenches according to the percentage-point margin they are held by on a two-party-preferred basis. This is also known as the swing required for the seat to change hands. Given a uniform swing to the opposition or government parties, the number of seats that change hands can be predicted.

== Two-party-preferred percentage ==
The candidate with the fewest votes is eliminated and redistributed to the voter's next choice until two candidates are left to gain a two-party-preferred figure.

Two-party-preferred polling by Newspoll, ACNielsen, Roy Morgan and Galaxy between the 2004 and 2007 federal election.

The two-party preferred (2PP) method of prediction attempts to estimate the flow of second and subsequent preferences from smaller parties in order of their expected elimination during the instant-runoff voting process, to establish ultimately which major party the voters will choose – Labor or Coalition (Liberal/National) in the Australian context. A Coalition 2PP of 51% would mean a Labor 2PP of 49% and vice versa. Whichever party polls the higher two-party-preferred percentage at the election usually holds the majority of seats to form government. Exceptions to this since 2PP was introduced in 1949 were in 1954 (49.3%), 1961 (49.5%), 1969 (49.8%), 1990 (49.90%), and 1998 (49.02%). 1940 was estimated to have been won on 49.7%.

Mackerras has taken account of fully distributed transferable preference votes since the 1983 federal election. Previously, he estimated a two-party-preferred outcome from limited, selective consideration of preferences.

The largest two-party-preferred election result for the Liberal Party of Australia was at the 1966 federal election, on 56.9%, while the largest two-party-preferred election result for the Australian Labor Party was at the 2025 federal election, on 55.22%. The largest unofficial result was 58.2% for Labor at the 1943 federal election, estimated by Mackerras.

Considering two-party-preferred estimates going back to the 1949 election, the swing to Labor at the 2007 federal election was the third-largest two-party swing, behind Malcolm Fraser and the coalition in 1975 on 7.4 percentage points and Gough Whitlam and Labor in 1969 on 7.1 points.

== See also ==
- Post-election pendulum for the 2025 Australian federal election
- Swingometer, a graphical device with similar functionality used in the United Kingdom since 1955
