= George Snow (bishop) =

Fifth Bishop of Whitby

George D'Oyly Snow (1903–1977) was a British schoolmaster and Anglican clergyman, who later served for a decade as the fifth Bishop of Whitby.

== Education and career ==
Snow was educated at Winchester College and Oriel College, Oxford.

Snow became an assistant master at Eton College (towards the end of which time he was ordained). After Eton he became Chaplain of Charterhouse, and then Headmaster of Ardingly College (1947–1961). He was appointed Prebendary of Chichester Cathedral in 1959. In 1961, he was consecrated a bishop and appointed Bishop of Whitby, a suffragan bishop in the Diocese of York.

Snow was a prolific author: amongst others he wrote A Guide to Prayer (1932), A School Service Book (1936), Into His Presence (1946), The Public School in the New Age (1959), and Forth in His Name (1964). He continued in retirement to chair The National Society.

== Personal life ==
He was the son of First World War General Sir Thomas D'Oyly Snow. In 1942 he married Joan Way, a pianist who had studied at the Royal College of Music and they had three sons including the Channel 4 newscaster Jon Snow. George Snow was the uncle of television presenter Peter Snow, father of television presenter Dan Snow.

A tall man, Snow was estimated by his son Jon to have stood at 6 foot 7 inches.

== Notes ==
Church of England titles
Preceded by Philip William Wheeldon	Bishop of Whitby; 1961 – 1971	Succeeded by John Yates
