= Dan Snow =

British historian and television presenter (born 1978)

Dan Snow MBE
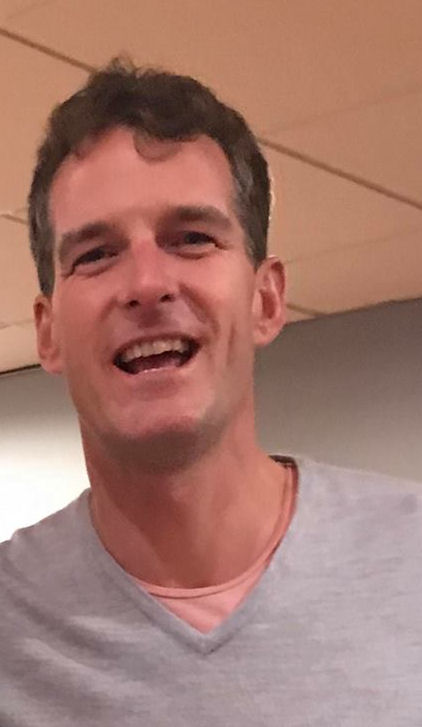
- Snow in 2019
- Born: Daniel Robert Snow; 3 December 1978 (age 47); Westminster, London, England
- Education: Balliol College, Oxford (BA)
- Occupations: Broadcaster, popular history
- Organisation: Electoral Reform Society (ambassador)
- Spouse: Lady Edwina Grosvenor (m. 2010)
- Children: 3
- Parents: Peter Snow (father); Ann MacMillan (mother)
- Relatives: Margaret MacMillan (aunt); Jon Snow (first cousin once removed); George Snow (great-uncle); Thomas Snow (great-grandfather); David Lloyd George (great-great-grandfather); Gerald Grosvenor, 6th Duke of Westminster (father-in-law); Natalia Grosvenor, Duchess of Westminster (mother-in-law); Hugh Grosvenor, 7th Duke of Westminster (brother-in-law)
- Website: twitter.com/thehistoryguy

Daniel Robert Snow (born 3 December 1978) is a British-Canadian historian, author and television presenter. He is known for his work on BBC history programmes, including Battlefield Britain and 20th Century Battlefields, and for presenting on major national events such as Trooping the Colour and the Lord Mayor's Show. Snow is the founder of History Hit, a digital history network encompassing podcasts, online video, and a streaming service. Appointed MBE in 2019 for services to history, he has also presented numerous history documentaries for Channel 5 and took part in the Endurance22 expedition that located Sir Ernest Shackleton's ship Endurance in 2022. He is an ambassador for the Electoral Reform Society and served as president of the Council for British Archaeology from 2013 to 2021.

== Early life and education ==
Dan Robert Snow was born on 3 December 1978 in Westminster, London. He is the youngest son of Peter Snow, BBC television journalist, and Ann MacMillan, a Canadian who is managing editor emerita of CBC's London Bureau; he therefore holds dual British and Canadian nationality. Through his mother, he is the nephew of the historian Margaret MacMillan and a great-great-grandson of the British prime minister David Lloyd George.

Snow was educated in London at Westfield Primary School (now Barnes Primary School) and at St Paul's School, where he was Captain of School and rowed for its VIII. He then went to Balliol College, Oxford, where his father had studied, and graduated with first-class honours in Modern History. A keen rower since his secondary school days, he won the U-23 men's division at the 2000 British Indoor Rowing Championships and rowed three times in the Boat Race. He won in 2000 and lost the controversial 2001 Boat Race, when he served as club president.

== Career ==
Snow presented his first programme in October 2002, shortly after graduating from university, co-presenting the BBC's 60th anniversary special on the Battles of El Alamein with his father. The two then collaborated on an eight-part documentary series, Battlefield Britain, which aired in 2004 and won a BAFTA Craft Award for special effects. In the same year, Snow won a Sony award as one of the presenters covering the Oxford-Cambridge Boat Race on the Thames.

Snow has presented on many state occasions, including the 200th anniversary celebration of the Battle of Trafalgar, Beating Retreat 2006, the 60th anniversary of the end of the Second World War, the 90th anniversary of the First World War Armistice in November 2008, Trooping the Colour, and the Lord Mayor's Show. He again collaborated with his father to present BBC 2's 20th Century Battlefields and its print edition. The series covers battles around the world and is presented in a similar fashion to Battlefield Britain.

In 2015, he founded History Hit, his own History media brand. It began as a podcast and has grown into a network encompassing a streaming service, Youtube channel, and multiple podcasts.

Snow presented on the Canadian Broadcasting Corporation's specials, with his mother for the funeral of Queen Elizabeth in 2022 and the coronation of Charles III and Camilla the following year.

In early 2022, Snow took part in the Endurance22 expedition that located Antarctic explorer Sir Ernest Shackleton's lost vessel, Endurance, 107 years after it sank in the Weddell Sea. He danced with Nadiya Bychkova in the 2023 Strictly Come Dancing Christmas Special.

== Personal life ==
On 27 November 2010, Snow married the criminologist and philanthropist Lady Edwina Louise Grosvenor, the second daughter of the 6th Duke of Westminster. The couple were married by the Bishop of Liverpool, James Jones, at his official residence, Bishop's Lodge. They have three children, the eldest and youngest being daughters. Their home, in the New Forest, has a private beach.

On 18 April 2010, Snow and a group of friends took three rigid-hulled inflatable boats from Dover to Calais to help 25 people return to Britain after they had been stranded in France by the air travel disruption caused by the Icelandic eruption. At Calais, they were told by the French authorities that they could not return to collect any more.

In August 2011, he chased a group of rioters through Notting Hill in west London before tackling and performing a citizen's arrest on a looter who was fleeing from a shoe shop.

Snow serves as president of the Council for British Archaeology and is a member of the Royal Historical Society. As an atheist and a humanist, he is a patron of Humanists UK and an Honorary Associate of the National Secular Society. He is also an advocate for political reform, serving as the Electoral Reform Society's first ambassador. He played a prominent part in the 2011 Alternative Vote referendum in the UK; after he released a viral video, the campaign used a version of it, featuring him, as their final referendum broadcast.

In August 2014, Snow was one of 200 public figures who signed a letter to The Guardian expressing their hope that Scotland would vote to remain part of the United Kingdom in the September referendum. In June 2019, Snow wrote in a Twitter thread that if Brexit happened and the Scottish National Party won a majority of votes in Scotland, he would "get" why Scottish people might want a second referendum, as leaving the European Union could "put up barriers" for Scotland. He was then asked whether this meant he now advised Scots to vote for independence, and he replied, "No way. One thing Brexit has taught me is the utter insanity of trying to rip countries apart".

Snow was one of 16 board members of More United, which endorsed parliamentary candidates who supported its values. The movement was set up in July 2016 "to stand up for our values of opportunity, tolerance, the environment, democracy, and openness".

Snow was an Honorary Captain in the Royal Naval Reserve.

== Television ==
Year	Work	Channel	Notes
2002	El Alamein	BBC Two	60th anniversary special of the Battle of El Alamein. Co-presented with Peter Snow.
2004	Battlefield Britain	BBC Two	Won – 2004 BAFTA Craft Awards (Visual Effects).
2005	Trafalgar 200	BBC Two	Co-presented with Neil Oliver.
2006	Shipwreck: Ark Royal	BBC One	
2007	20th Century Battlefields	BBC Two	Co-presented with Peter Snow.
2007	Edwardian Winners and Losers	BBC Four	
2007	In Living Memory	BBC One	
2008	What Britain Earns	BBC Two	Co-presented with Peter Snow.
2008	Britain's Lost World	BBC One	Co-presented with Kate Humble and Steve Backshall.
2008	Hadrian	BBC Two; BBC Wales	Won – 2009 BAFTA Cymru (Best Presenter).
2008	50 Things You Need To Know About British History	History Channel	
2008	My Family at War	BBC One	
2009	Grouchy Young Men	Comedy Central	Cameo (pilot only).
2009	Montezuma	BBC Two	
2010	Empire of the Seas: How the Navy Forged the Modern World	BBC Two	
2010	Battle for North America	BBC Two	
2010	Little Ships	BBC Two	
2010	Dan Snow's Norman Walks	BBC Four; BBC Two	
2010	How the Celts Saved Britain	BBC Four	
2011	Filthy Cities	BBC Two	
2011	China's Terracotta Army	BBC One	
2011	National Treasures Live	BBC One	
2012	Dig WW2 with Dan Snow	BBC One Northern Ireland; History Channel	Three-part series investigating stories of World War II battlegrounds through excavations and dives.
2012	Battle Castle	History Channel; Discovery Channel	
2012	Rome's Lost Empire	BBC One	
2013	Locomotion: Dan Snow's History of Railways	BBC Two	Three-part series exploring the history of rail transport in Great Britain from its beginnings in the 18th century until the World War II.
2013	A History of Syria with Dan Snow	BBC Two	This World episode exploring Syria's complex past and the roots of the current crisis.
2013	The Dambusters: 70 Years On	BBC Two	Episode marking the 70th anniversary of the Dambuster raids, presenting veterans accounts of the events.
2013	D-Day: The Last Heroes	BBC One	Two-part series exploring the story of the D-Day landings planning and execution through the accounts of surviving veterans.
2013	Dan Snow's History of Congo	BBC Two	This World episode exploring Congo's history of slavery, colonialism, endemic corruption and war.
2013	Airport Live	BBC Two	Originally intended to be one of the presenters, but was unable to because of family reasons; involved in pre-recorded clips.
2013	Have I Got News For You	BBC One	
2014	Operation Grand Canyon with Dan Snow	BBC Two	Two-part series recreating John Wesley Powell's 1869 trip of the Colorado River through the Grand Canyon, where a team of nine men in period-correct boats and equipment navigates the canyon's 280 miles of river.
2014	Dan Snow's History of the Winter Olympics	BBC Two	Episode exploring the 20th and 21st centuries political upheaval impact at the 90 years of the Winter Olympic Games.
2014	The Birth of Empire: The East India Company	BBC Two	Two-part series exploring the story of the East India Company and how it changed British lifestyle, creating an empire and today's global trading systems.
2015	Armada: 12 Days to Save England	BBC Two	Three-part series exploring the story of the Spanish Armada using discovered documents and computer-generated imagery.
2015	World's Busiest Railway 2015	BBC Two	Four-part series, exploring the science, systems and staff at Chhatrapati Shivaji Terminus in Mumbai. Co-presented with Anita Rani and Robert Llewellyn.
2016	The Vikings Uncovered	BBC One	90 minute episode exploring the Vikings expansion to the west and uncovering new settlements.
2016	New York: America's Busiest City	BBC Two	3x60 minute episodes exploring New York City, co-presented with Anita Rani, Ant Anstead and Ade Adepitan
2016	Hunting the Nazi Gold Train	BBC Two	60-minute episode exploring Project Riese, Schloss Fürstenstein and the search for the "Nazi gold train".
2016	Operation Gold Rush	BBC Two	3x60 minute episodes exploring the Klondike gold rush.
2016	Dan Snow on Lloyd George: My Great-Great-Grandfather	BBC Wales	60 minute episode exploring the personal life and political career of David Lloyd George. First broadcast on 7 December 2016.
2017	1066: A Year to Conquer England	BBC Two	3x60 minute episodes exploring the events of 1066 in English history
2020	Tutankhamun With Dan Snow	Channel Five	4x60 minute episodes about the history of Tutankhamun.
2020	The Dambusters	Channel Five	3x60 minute episodes about the RAF's 617 'Dambusters' squadron during WW2.
2022	Dan Snow: Into the Valley of the Kings	Channel Five	Documentary exploring the history of the Valley of the Kings.
2022	Into Dinosaur Valley with Dan Snow	Channel Five	Documentary about America's most significant dinosaur fossil discoveries.
2023	The Black Death	Channel Five	Two-part documentary series.
2023	Pompeii: The Discovery with Dan Snow	Channel Five	Documentary about the ancient Roman city of Pompeii.
2024	Atlantis: The Discovery with Dan Snow	Channel Five	Documentary about the lost city of Atlantis
2024	Stonehenge: The Discovery with Dan Snow	Channel Five	Documentary about the prehistoric megalithic Stonehenge
2024	The Terracotta Army with Dan Snow	Channel Five	Documentary about the mausoleum complex of the First Qin Emperor of China and its Terracotta Army
2024	The Colosseum with Dan Snow	Channel Five	Two-part documentary (The Arena of Death and Blood & Sand) about the history of the Colosseum
2025	Dan Snow & the Lost City	Channel Five	Documentary about Machu Picchu.
2025	Pompeii: Life in the City with Dan Snow	Channel Five	Four-part documentary series.
2025	King Tut: The Discovery with Dan Snow	Channel Five	Documentary about King Tut.
2026	Egypt With Dan Snow	Channel Five	Three-part documentary series.
2026	The Odyssey with Dan Snow	Channel Five	One-off documentary.
2026	World War II with Tom Hanks	History Channel	World War II documentary series.
2026	The Great Wall of China with Dan Snow	Channel Five	One-off documentary.
2026	How The Tudors Lost Their Heads	National Geographic UK	Six-part documentary series. Co-presented with Suzannah Lipscomb.
2026	1066: The Lost Battlefield	History Hit	One-off documentary.

=== Radio ===
- Art in the Trenches, Radio 4
- At War with Wellington, Radio 4
- Prince of Wales, Radio 4, a look at the history of the office of Prince of Wales and the current occupant

=== Online ===
- Dan Snow’s, History HitNetwork
- The Historic Present Pod, Charlie Gordon & Jonah Howe

=== Books ===
- Snow, Dan; Snow, Peter (2004). Battlefield Britain. London: Random House (BBC Books). ISBN 0-563-48789-5.
- Snow, Dan; Snow, Peter (2008). 20th Century Battlefields. Random House (BBC Books). ISBN 978-144-8140-596.
- Snow, Dan (2009). Death or Victory: the Battle of Quebec and the birth of Empire. London: Harper Press. ISBN 978-0-00-728620-1.
- Snow, Dan; Pottle, Mark (2011). The Confusion of Command: The Memoirs of Lieutenant-General Sir Thomas D'Oyly 'Snowball' Snow 1914 -1918. Frontline Books. ISBN 978-1848325753.
- Snow, Dan (2012). Battle Castles: 500 Years of Knights and Siege Warfare. London: Harper Press. ISBN 978-0-00-745558-4.
- Snow, Dan; Snow, Peter (2015). The Battle of Waterloo Experience. Andre Deutsch Ltd. ISBN 978-0233004471.
- Snow, Dan; Snow, Peter (2018). Treasures of British History: The Nation's Story Told Through Its 50 Most Important Documents. Welbeck Publishing. ISBN 978-0233005621.
- Snow, Dan (2018). On This Day in History. London: John Murray. ISBN 978-1473691278.
- Snow, Dan (2024). History Hit Story of England: Making of a Nation. London: Hodder & Stoughton. ISBN 978-1399726160.

=== Awards and honours ===
Snow was appointed Member of the Order of the British Empire (MBE) in the 2019 Birthday Honours for services to history. In 2019 Snow was awarded a Doctor of Letters (DLitt) honoris causa from Lancaster University. Other awards and honours include:

- BAFTA (Visual Effects) for 'Battlefield Britain'
- Sony Award (Best Live Coverage) for Boat Race Day
- BAFTA Cymru (Best Presenter) for 'Hadrian'
- Maritime Media Award for best television, film or radio for 'Empire of the Seas'
- 2011 History Makers Award (Most Innovative Production) for 'Battle for North America' a 1-hour special on Snow's book 'Death or Victory.' Produced by Snow's production company Ballista
- Voice of the Listener & Viewer Special Award 2013

== Ancestry ==
Ancestors of Dan Snow

16. Rev. George D'Oyly Snow
8. Sir Thomas D'Oyly Snow
17. Maria Jane Barlow
4. Brig. John FitzGerald Snow
18. Maj. Gen. John Talbot Coke
9. Charlotte Geraldine Coke
19. Charlotte FitzGerald
2. Peter Snow
20. John Pringle
10. Seton Sidney Pringle
21. Maria Adelaide King
5. Margaret Mary Pringle
22. Dr. Andrew McMunn
11. Ethel Louisa McMunn
23. Mary Jane McMunn
1. Daniel Robert Snow
24. John MacMillan
12. Robert Thurston MacMillan
25. Mary McWilliams
6. Robert Laidlaw MacMillan
26. William Laidlaw
13. Elizabeth Morrell Laidlaw
27. Sarah Wyllie
3. Ann Elizabeth MacMillan
28. Dr. Robert Davies Evans
14. Sir Thomas John Evans
29. Elizabeth Ann Jones
7. Eluned Jane Evans
30. David Lloyd George, 1st Earl Lloyd-George of Dwyfor
15. Lady Olwen Elizabeth Lloyd George
31. Dame Margaret Lloyd George
