= Stephen Shoosmith =

Major-General Stephen Shoosmith CB DSO* OBE
- Born: 15 September 1900
- Died: 3 December 1956 (aged 56)
- Military career
- Allegiance: United Kingdom
- Branch: British Army
- Service years: 1920–1956
- Rank: Major-General
- Service number: 18052
- Commands: 10th Infantry Brigade
- Conflicts: Second World War; Korean War
- Awards: Companion of the Order of the Bath; Distinguished Service Order & Bar; Officer of the Order of the British Empire; Commander of the Legion of Merit (United States)

Major-General Stephen Newton Shoosmith, CB, DSO & Bar, OBE (15 September 1900 – 3 December 1956) was a senior British Army officer. He served as Principal Staff Officer to the Deputy Supreme Commander, Allied Powers in Europe and, but for his early death, was expected to reach the highest positions in the service.

== Early life and education ==
Shoosmith was educated at Blundell's School and the Royal Military College, Sandhurst. He was commissioned in the Royal Artillery in 1920 and passed the Staff College, Camberley, which he attended from 1935 to 1936. He married Kathleen Noad in 1938 and had a son and daughter.

== Second World War ==
By the time the Second World War broke out, Shoosmith had served in India and Egypt, and in the autumn of 1939 he went to France as a brigade major with the 3rd Division.

He was assistant military secretary to the War Cabinet in 1941 and the following year he was given command of a field regiment. He later served in North Africa, Italy, and Greece, and rose to command the 10th Infantry Brigade in the 4th Infantry Division. He was awarded the Distinguished Service Order and Bar and was appointed an Officer of the Order of the British Empire.

== Post war ==
After the war Shoosmith was in Germany for two years and then in 1949 became Chief of Staff, Anti-Aircraft Command in the United Kingdom. His next post was in Washington, D.C., where he assumed command of the Army Staff of the British Joint Services Mission. His experiences there served him in good stead when, in July 1952, he was appointed Deputy Chief of Staff to General Mark Clark, the United Nations Commander in Korea. There had been lack of consultation between the British and Americans over an implied threat to bomb Chinese bases in Manchuria, and the appointment was regarded as an assurance that a similar failure would not be repeated. He was not an agent of the British Government at General Clark's headquarters but a senior member of the latter's staff, the only one who was not an American. However, his presence ensured that British reactions would not be ignored through lack of representation. General Clark welcomed his arrival and recalled their happy association in Washington when he was Chief of the United States Army Field Forces. Shoosmith quickly gained the confidence of all the United Nations officers with whom he was associated, while advancing the British Government's point of view.

In 1954 Shoosmith was relieved in Korea by Major General Hirsch and transferred in November to Supreme Allied Headquarters in Europe as principal staff officer to Field Marshal Viscount Montgomery, the Deputy Supreme Allied Commander Europe.

Shoosmith was made a Commander of the United States Legion of Merit in 1954.
