= Listed buildings in Trusley =

Trusley is a civil parish in the South Derbyshire district of Derbyshire, England. The parish contains eight listed buildings that are recorded in the National Heritage List for England. Of these, one is listed at Grade II*, the middle of the three grades, and the others are at Grade II, the lowest grade. The parish contains the villages of Trusley and Longlane, and the surrounding countryside. The listed buildings include houses and cottages, two churches, and a muniment room converted from a summer house.

== Key ==
Grade	Criteria
II*	Particularly important buildings of more than special interest
II	Buildings of national importance and special interest

== Buildings ==
Name and location	Photograph	Date	Notes	Grade
Tatlow Cottage; 52.91709°N 1.62279°W	—	15th century	The cottage has a cruck timber framed core on a stone plinth, the outer walls have been rebuilt in brick with some stone, and the roof is tiled. There are two storeys and two bays. Most of the windows are casements with cambered heads, and there is a single-light fixed window with a semicircular head. On the front is some exposed timber framing, and in the north gable end is a 20th-century porch. Inside, there is a large inglenook fireplace, and in the upper floor is an exposed cruck truss.	II
Muniment Room; 52.91535°N 1.62520°W	—	Early 17th century	A summer house converted into a muniment room in 1980, it is in red brick on a coped plinth, with quoins, and a hipped pyramidal tile roof. There is a single storey over a basement, and a single bay. On the north side, steps lead up to a doorway with a semicircular head, a moulded surround, moulded imposts, and a keystone. It is flanked by pilasters with carved capitals, a decorated frieze, and an open swan-necked pediment with an achievement. On the corners are pilasters with scrolled brackets, and the windows are mullioned and transomed. On the east front is a doorway with an inscribed lintel.	II
All Saints Church, Trusley; 52.91668°N 1.62437°W		1712–13	The chancel was altered and the vestry was added in about 1900. The church is in red brick with vitrified headings and stone dressings on a plinth, with rusticated quoins, chamfered copings, a moulded string course, parapets with moulded copings, a lead roof to the nave and a tile roof to the chancel. The church consists of a short nave, a lower chancel with a north vestry, and a west tower. The doorway has a semicircular head, imposts and a keystone, and is surrounded by a doorcase flanked by pilasters with decorated capitals, a triglyph frieze with a bucranium and circles, and a swan-neck pediment with an achievement. To the right are two windows with semicircular heads, imposts and keystones.	II*
Ivy Close Farmhouse; 52.91737°N 1.62549°W	—	Early 18th century	The farmhouse is in red brick on a plinth, with a floor band, a dentilled eaves band, and a tile roof. There are two storeys and three bays. The doorway has a segmental head, the windows in the ground floor are cross windows with casements, and in the upper floor are casement windows, all with segmental heads. Inside, there is a large inglenook fireplace.	II
Trusley Old Hall, cottage and Village Hall; 52.91613°N 1.62486°W	—	Mid 18th century	A farmhouse and outbuildings, later two houses and a village hall, in red brick with tile roofs, forming three ranges round a courtyard. The house has two storeys and attics, and three bays, and incorporates at the rear two bays from the outbuildings. The windows are sashes with segmental heads, and there is a roof dormer with a hipped roof. The north range has been converted into the village hall, with three-light windows, and the west range contains cross windows and two doorways with four-centred arched heads.	II
Lane End Cottage; 52.91696°N 1.62279°W		Early 19th century	The house is in red brick with a dentilled eaves band and a tile roof. There are two storeys and three bays. In the centre is a porch flanked by small single-light windows, and the other windows are casements with cambered heads.	II
Home Farmhouse and outbuilding 52.91663°N 1.62259°W		1827	The farmhouse and outbuilding are in red brick with a sawtooth eaves band, a tile roof, hipped to the west, and two storeys. The farmhouse has an L-shaped plan, with fronts of two and three bays. In the centre is a two-storey gabled porch, and a doorway with a divided fanlight. The windows are a mix of sashes and casements. Attached to the east under a continuous roof is an outbuilding with two bays, containing two segmental-headed doorways, casement windows, and a row of diamond vents. The date is inscribed in blue brick headers.	II
Christ Church, Longlane; 52.93886°N 1.62581°W		1859	The tower and vestry were added in 1874. The church is in red brick with dressings in stone a Staffordshire blue brick and tile roofs. It consists of a four-bay nave, a south porch a two-bay chancel and a tower and vestry to the north, canted at the end. The tower has three stages, a moulded string course, slit windows, clock faces, three-light bell openings, and a saddleback roof with stone coped gables.	II
