= Barnes Primary School =

Location
- Cross Street; Barnes, London, SW13; England
- Coordinates: 51°28′07″N 0°15′03″W

Information
- Type: Community primary
- Established: 1870
- Local authority: London Borough of Richmond upon Thames
- Department for Education URN: 102902 Tables
- Ofsted: Reports
- Headteacher: Sue Jepson
- Gender: Coeducational
- Age: 3 to 11
- Enrolment: c.420
- Website: barnesprimaryschool.co.uk

Barnes Primary School (formerly Westfield Primary School) is a community primary school in Barnes, London, in the London Borough of Richmond upon Thames, England and is the oldest school in Barnes. The school educates pupils aged three to eleven and includes a nursery. The present school buildings were completed in 2003 following a major redevelopment of the site.

== History ==
The origins of Barnes Primary School lie in the Westfields School, which opened in Barnes in 1870 during a period of rapid suburban growth in the area. Before the opening of Westfields, many local children attended the older village school on Barnes Green. Contemporary reminiscences recorded that pupils transferred from the Barnes Green school to Westfields when the new school opened. By the late nineteenth century the institution was commonly referred to collectively as the Westfields Schools, reflecting the typical Victorian arrangement of separate departments for boys, girls and infants serving the Westfields district.

In the early twentieth century an infants’ school building associated with the Westfields schools opened around 1903–1904, and this date later became the foundation year used by the modern Barnes Primary School. During the inter-war period the school was widely referred to simply as Westfields School, and a report in the Richmond Herald in 1934 described it as “the oldest of the Barnes schools”. The school operated as a junior mixed council school during this period.

Like many London schools, Westfields was affected by the Second World War. Pupils were evacuated from Barnes to Reading during the early years of the war, where they continued their education temporarily. Reports at the time noted visits by the headmaster to the evacuated pupils and the continued organisation of the school during the evacuation period.

The long-serving headmaster E. V. Mellon retired in 1935 after fifteen years at the school and thirty-eight years as a headmaster in Surrey schools. During the wartime period the school was led by Alfred W. Jefferies, who is mentioned in contemporary reports concerning the evacuated pupils.

By the late twentieth century the school was known as Westfields Primary School. In 1999 the London Borough of Richmond upon Thames applied for permission to expand the buildings at Westfields Primary School in Westfields Avenue in order to accommodate increasing pupil numbers. The redevelopment culminated in the completion of a new school building in 2003, when the school expanded to two-form entry and adopted the name Barnes Primary School.

The school was extensively rebuilt and expanded in 2003, increasing capacity to around 420 pupils and providing modern facilities for primary education in Barnes. In 1999 the London Borough of Richmond upon Thames had applied for permission to expand the earlier Westfields Primary School buildings in Westfields Avenue to accommodate rising pupil numbers. Following the redevelopment the school adopted the name Barnes Primary School. Since the expansion the school has consistently received strong inspection outcomes from Ofsted and has been judged Outstanding in its most recent inspections.

== Ofsted ==
Barnes Primary School has been inspected several times by Ofsted. The school was judged Outstanding in 2008 and retained this judgement in its most recent inspection in 2022.

Ofsted inspection results
Inspection date	Overall effectiveness	Report
4–5 February 2004	Good	
10–11 June 2008	Outstanding	
17 November 2022	Outstanding	

== Headteachers ==
- E. V. Mellon (c.1920–1935)
- Alfred W. Jefferies (by 1940)
- Felicity Sugden (by 2004)
- Mark Hartley (by 2008)
- Sue Jepson (by 2020)

== Notable former pupils ==
- Dan Snow
