= Trusley =

Village in Derbyshire, England

Coordinates: 52.917°N 1.623°W

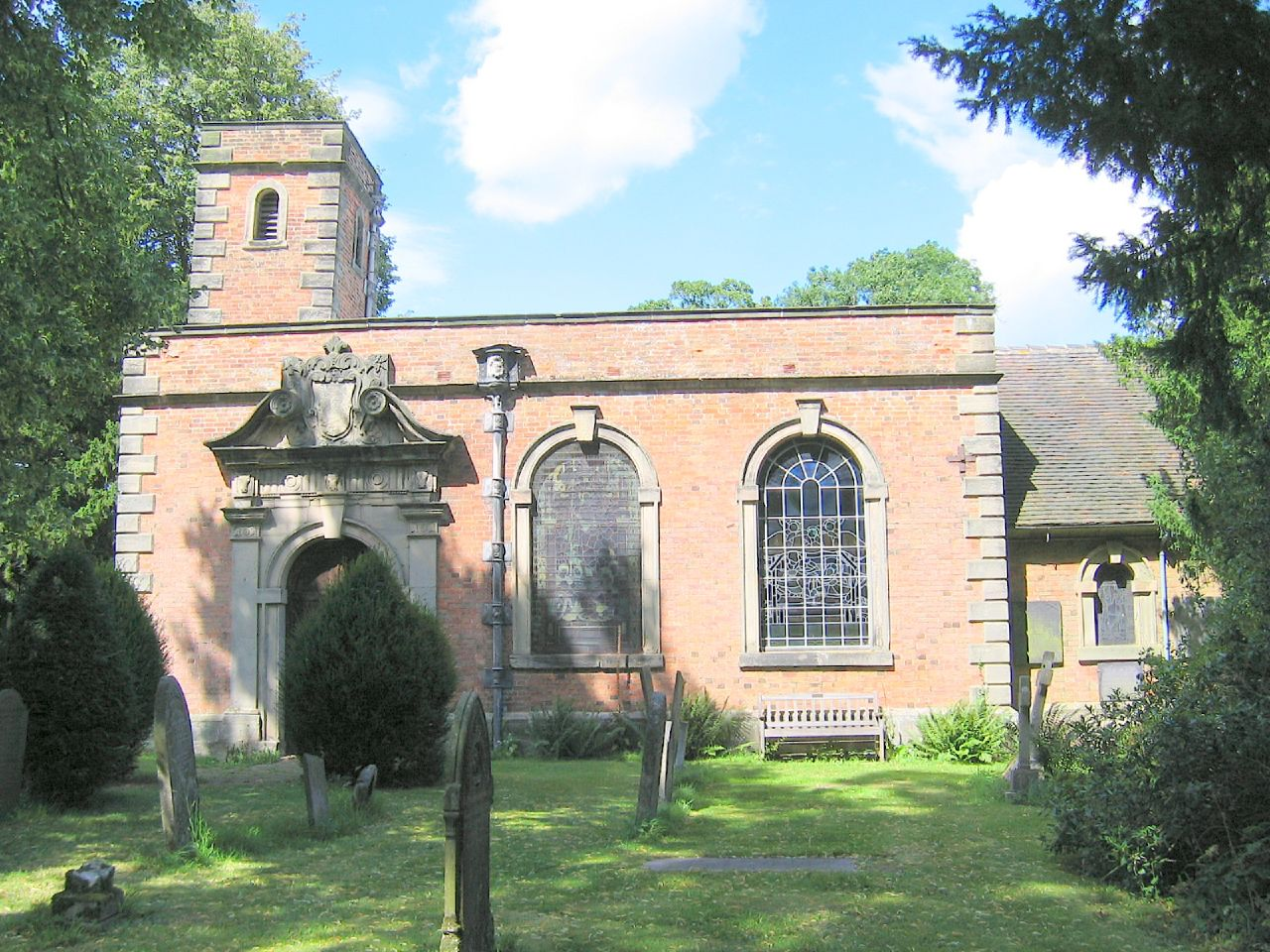
- Trusley church.

- Location within Derbyshire
- OS grid reference: SK254355
- District: South Derbyshire
- Shire county: Derbyshire
- Region: East Midlands
- Country: England
- Sovereign state: United Kingdom
- Post town: DERBY
- Postcode district: DE6
- Police: Derbyshire
- Fire: Derbyshire
- Ambulance: East Midlands

Trusley is a parish and small village in South Derbyshire. As the civil parish population is only minimal details are included in the civil parish of Dalbury Lees.

The manor was given to Henry de Ferrers together with many villages in Derbyshire for his contribution to the Norman Conquest.

Oliver De Odingsells purchased the Manor of Trusley from Ralph de Beufey in the reign of King Henry III [1216-72].

In 1418 a De Odingsells co-heiresses married Thomas Coke and from this time the Coke family came to live at Trusley.

Notable members of that family include George Coke, D'Ewes Coke, Sir John Coke (d.1644), Statesman, Daniel Parker Coke, MP

Many of the buildings in Trusley village date from the 18th century including All Saints Church built for William Coke in 1712.

The original homes of the Cokes' have long since vanished, however in 1904 Major General John Talbot Coke built a new Trusley Manor. In 1948, at the end of the second world war, Trusley Manor was reduced in size.

== See also ==
- Listed buildings in Trusley
