= Battle Castle =

- Genre: Action Documentary
- Directed by: Ian Herring
- Starring: Dan Snow
- No. of episodes: 6

Production
- Producers: Ian Herring, Thomas Clifford, Maija Leivo, Elizabeth Murray
- Running time: 60 min

Original release
- Release: February 23, 2012

Dan Snow at Crac des Chevaliers, Syria.

Battle Castle is an action documentary TV series co-produced by Parallax Film Productions Inc. with London-based Ballista Media Inc. It explores the medieval arms race reflected in castle construction in the Middle Ages and, using location filming, re-enactments and CGI reconstruction, tells the stories of six castles tested by siege. Hosted by Dan Snow, the series has aired on History Television, SBS Australia and most recently, Discovery UK.

== Episodes ==
- Crac des Chevaliers
- Château Gaillard
- Dover Castle
- Conwy Castle
- Malbork Castle
- Málaga

== Website ==
A screencapture from the "Crac des Chevaliers" motion comic

A website features games, motion comics and extra video content not seen on the show.

== Book ==
Written by Dan Snow as an accompaniment to the show, the book Battle Castles: 500 Years of Knights and Siege Warfare details the stories of each castle featured in Battle Castle. Released on September 27, 2012.
