= 10th Infantry Brigade (United Kingdom) =

Combat formation of the British Army

10th Brigade 10th Infantry Brigade
- Active: 1899–1900; 1902–1947; 1956–1958
- Country: United Kingdom
- Branch: British Army
- Type: Infantry
- Size: Brigade
- Part of: 4th Infantry Division
- Garrison/HQ: Shorncliffe Army Camp; Essex Barracks, Hildesheim (1956–58)
- Engagements: Second Boer War; First World War; Second World War

Commanders
- Notable commanders: Samuel Lomax; Edward Montagu-Stuart-Wortley; Aylmer Haldane; Sir Evelyn Barker

The 10th Infantry Brigade was a Regular Army infantry brigade of the British Army formed during the Second Boer War in 5th Division, and during both World Wars the brigade was part of the 4th Infantry Division.

== Second Boer War ==
British Army brigades had traditionally been ad hoc formations known by the name of their commander or numbered as part of a division. However, units involved in the Second Boer War in 1899 were organised into sequentially numbered brigades that were frequently reassigned between divisions. The Army Corps sent from Britain in 1899 comprised six brigades in three divisions while the troops already in South Africa were intended to constitute a fourth division. The rapid deterioration of the situation led the War Office to announce on 11 November 1899 that a 5th Division was to be formed and sent out. This consisted of the new 10th and 11th (Lancashire) Brigades and concentrated at Estcourt on 8 January 1900 for the campaign for the Relief of Ladysmith.

=== Order of Battle ===
The 10th Brigade under the command of Major-General John Talbot Coke was constituted as follows:

- 2nd Battalion, Royal Warwickshire Regiment
- 1st Battalion, Yorkshire Regiment
- 2nd Battalion, Dorsetshire Regiment
- 2nd Battalion, Middlesex Regiment
- 1st Battalion, Royal Dublin Fusiliers

However, The Royal Warwicks and Yorkshires were left at Cape Town to join Lord Roberts's army while the rest of the brigade continued on to join Sir Redvers Buller's Natal Field Force, where it was separated from 5th Division and used as Corps Troops. However, it returned to 5th Division for the Spion Kop, when Coke temporarily commanded the division and Lieutenant-Colonel A.W. Hill of the Middlesex commanded the brigade, which included the Imperial Light Infantry.

After Spion Kop the brigade served at the Tugela Heights, Trichard's Drift, Tabanyama, Vaal Krantz, Hlangwane, Helpmakaar, Botha's Pass, Alleman's Nek, Charlestown and Paardekop. However, after the defeat of the main Boer field armies and the development of guerrilla warfare, all the divisions and brigades were broken up to form ad hoc 'columns' and garrisons.

After the Boer War, 10th Brigade became a permanent formation in 1902, originally based at Shorncliffe Army Camp and serving with the 5th Division in the 2nd Army Corps until 1907. In the Expeditionary Force established by the Haldane reforms, 10th Brigade still at Shorncliffe became part of 4th Division, and remained so until the outbreak of World War I.

== First World War ==
With the 4th Division, the 10th brigade served with the British Expeditionary Force (BEF) on the Western Front and was one of the first British units to be sent overseas upon the declaration of war.

=== Order of battle ===
The 10th Brigade was constituted as follows during the war:

- 1st Battalion, Royal Warwickshire Regiment
- 2nd Battalion, Seaforth Highlanders
- 1st Battalion, Royal Irish Fusiliers (until August 1917)
- 2nd Battalion, Royal Dublin Fusiliers (until November 1916)
- 1/7th Battalion, Argyll and Sutherland Highlanders (from January 1915 until March 1916)
- Household Battalion (from November 1916 until February 1918)
- 3/10th Battalion, Middlesex Regiment (from August 1917 until February 1918)
- 2nd Battalion, Duke of Wellington's Regiment (from February 1918)

=== Service ===
During the war the brigade participated in the following actions:

1914

- Retreat from Mons, 25 August–5 September
- Battle of Le Cateau, 16 August
- Affair of Néry, 1 September
- First Battle of the Marne, 6–9 September
- Crossing of the Aisne, 12 September
- First Battle of the Aisne, 13–20 September
- Battle of Armentières, 3 October–2 November
  - Capture of Méteren, 13 October

1915

- Second Battle of Ypres:
  - Battle of St Julien 25 April–4 May
  - Battle of Frezenberg Ridge, 8–13 May
  - Battle of Bellewaarde Ridge, 24–25 May

1916

- Battle of the Somme:
  - Battle of Albert, 1–2 July
  - Battle of the Transloy Ridges, 10–18 October

1917

- Battle of Arras:
  - First Battle of the Scarpe, 9–14 April
  - Second Battle of the Scarpe, 3–4 May
- Third Battle of Ypres:
  - Battle of Polygon Wood, 28 September–3 October
  - Battle of Broodseinde, 4 October
  - Battle of Poelcappelle, 9 October
  - First Battle of Passchendaele, 12 October

1918

- German Spring Offensive:
  - Third Battle of Arras, 28 March
- Battle of the Lys:
  - Battle of Hazebrouck, 13–15 April, including defence of Hinges Wood
  - Battle of Béthune, 18 April
- Hundred Days Offensive:
  - Battle of the Scarpe, 29–30 August
  - Battle of the Drocourt-Quéant Line, 2–3 September
  - Battle of the Canal du Nord, 27 September–1 October
  - Battle of the Selle, 17–25 October
  - Battle of Valenciennes, 1–2 November

== Second World War ==
The 10th Infantry Brigade, commanded since August 1938 by Brigadier Evelyn Barker, again saw active service as part of the British Expeditionary Force (BEF) that was sent to France after the outbreak of war in 1939, arriving there on 1 October, less than a month since the outbreak of the Second World War. The brigade and division were evacuated at Dunkirk after fierce fighting in the battles of France and Belgium.

After being based in the United Kingdom, the brigade spent many years on home defence and training duties, anticipating a German invasion which never arrived. The brigade was later sent to Algeria and Tunisia in 1943.

After this the brigade fought in Italy where it saw extremely hard fighting at Monte Cassino through most of 1944, before being shipped off to Greece to help calm the Civil War as part of Lieutenant General Ronald Scobie's III Corps, where it ended the war.

=== Order of battle ===
The 10th Infantry Brigade was constituted as follows during the war:

- 2nd Battalion, Bedfordshire and Hertfordshire Regiment
- 2nd Battalion, Duke of Cornwall's Light Infantry
- 1st Battalion, Queen's Own Royal West Kent Regiment (to May 1940)
- 10th Infantry Brigade Anti-Tank Company (left to join 4th Battalion, Reconnaissance Corps, 1 January 1941)
- 1/6th Battalion, East Surrey Regiment (from May 1940)

== Postwar ==
The brigade was disbanded in Greece in 1947. However, following the reactivation of the 4th Infantry Division on 1 April 1956, from the 11th Armoured Division of the British Army of the Rhine (BAOR), the 10th Brigade, formerly the 91st Lorried Infantry Brigade, again became part of the division (again, along with the 11th and 12th Infantry Brigades). The brigade headquarters was at Essex Barracks in Hildesheim until it was finally disbanded in April 1958.

== Commanders ==
The following officers commanded the 10th Infantry Brigade throughout its existence:

- Major-General John Talbot Coke: 1900
- Lieutenant-Colonel A.W. Hill: (acting) 1900
- Brigadier-General William E. Franklyn: October 1902 – March 1904
- Brigadier-General Samuel H. Lomax: April 1904 – April 1908
- Brigadier-General the Hon. Edward J. Montagu-Stuart-Wortley: April 1908 – April 1912
- Brigadier-General J. Aylmer L. Haldane: April 1912 – 18 November 1914
- Brigadier-General C.P. Amyatt Hull: 18 November 1914 – 5 February 1916
- Brigadier-General Charles A. Wilding: 5 February–27 December 1916
- Brigadier-General Charles Gosling: 27 December 1916 – killed 12 April 1917
- Lieutenant-Colonel G. N. B. Forster: 12 April 1917 (acting)
- Brigadier-General Aubrey G. Pritchard: 14 April–27 November 1917
- Brigadier-General H.W. Green: 27 November 1917 – 16 April 1918
- Brigadier-General John Greene: 16 April 1918 – December 1919
- Brigadier-General Winston J. Dugan: December 1919 – December 1923
- Brigadier-General Albemarle B.E. Cator: December 1923 – October 1925
- Brigadier-General Thomas W. Stansfeld: October 1925 – March 1929
- Brigadier Francis H. Stapleton: March 1929 – March 1932
- Brigadier William N. Herbert: March 1932 – August 1934
- Brigadier Robert H. Willan: August 1934 – August 1938
- Brigadier Evelyn H. Barker: August 1938 – October 1940
- Brigadier Walter E. Clutterbuck: October 1940 – November 1941
- Brigadier Owen M. Wales: November 1941 – June 1942
- Brigadier John H. Hogshaw: June 1942 – December 1943
- Brigadier Stephen N. Shoosmith: December 1943 – March 1945
- Brigadier Rudolph C.H. Kirwan: March 1945
- Brigadier John A. Mackenzie: March 1945–
- Brigadier Graham Peddie: 1953 – April 1956
- Brigadier Ronald C. Macdonald: April 1956 – 1959
