= John Talbot Coke =

British Army general (1841–1912)

Major-General John Talbot Coke JP DL
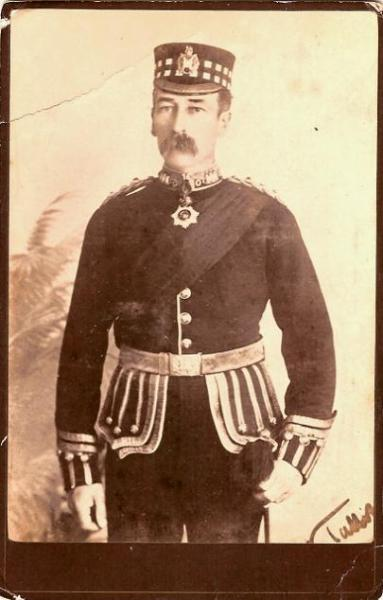
- Born: 9 August 1841; Trusley, South Derbyshire
- Died: 2 February 1912 (aged 70); Trusley, South Derbyshire
- Military career
- Allegiance: United Kingdom
- Branch: British Army
- Service years: 1859–1901
- Rank: Major-General
- Unit: King's Own Scottish Borderers
- Conflicts: Fenian raids Mahdist War; Suakin; Second Boer War: Spion Kop; Vaal Krantz; Tugela Heights; Laing's Nek

Major-General John Talbot Coke (9 August 1841 – 2 February 1912) was a British Army officer who served in the 25th Foot (King's Own Scottish Borderers) between 1859 and 1901. He was a Brigade Commander during the Second Boer War having a prominent role in the battles of Spion Kop and the Tugela Heights during the relief of Ladysmith.

He wrote a family history book called Coke of Trusley, in the County of Derby, and Branches Therefrom; a Family History, which was published in 1880.

== Early life and career ==
John Talbot Coke was born at Trusley Manor in 1841, the eldest son of Honorary Col. Edward Thomas Coke, a captain of the 69th Regiment and Diana Talbot, descendant of John Talbot, 1st Earl of Shrewsbury. Trusley had been held by the Coke family since 1418. His great-grandfather was the Reverend D'Ewes Coke, a colliery owner and philanthropist.

He was educated at Harrow and gained his commission in 1859, gaining his Lieutenancy with the 25th Foot in 1861.

== Military career ==
In 1866 he was promoted to captain while in Canada during the Fenian raids. By 1888, now a colonel he was second in command of the King's Own Scottish Borderers in the Sudan and took part in the one-sided victory at Suakin for which he was Mentioned in Despatches, gaining both the Khedive's Star and a 3rd class Medjidie. In 1889 he was involved in operations on the Nile, presumably as part of the war against the Mahdist's.

Coke was assistant adjutant general at Headquarters in Ireland 1891, in the Curragh district (County Kildare) in 1894, and deputy adjutant general in Aldershot Command in 1886. He was colonel on the staff commanding the troops in British Mauritius at the outbreak of the Second Boer War in late 1899.

== Second Boer War ==
Talbot Coke was appointed to a field command and left for South Africa as commanding officer of the 10th Brigade, part of General Sir Charles Warren's Division of the Natal Field Force which joined in the effort to relieve Ladysmith shortly after the Battle of Colenso.

=== Spion Kop ===
Sir Redvers Buller now devised a plan to launch a two-pronged offensive across the Tugela River and therefore ordered General Warren to lead the main force across at Trichardt's drift and attack the Boer right flank however, when they did cross (almost a week later) Warren quickly realised he would not get far unless they could take and hold the summit of a commanding position called Spion Kop. Major General Edward Woodgate was selected to lead the attack as Coke was still recovering from a broken leg. Woodgate successfully led his troops at night to what he believed was the summit, where they dully entrenched themselves; however, when day broke and the fog lifted, they came under heavy fire from higher up on the hilltop, and Woodgate himself was killed along with most of his subordinate officers. Warren sent Coke's brigade to reinforce the position but was ordered by Buller to put Lieutenant Colonel Alexander Thorneycroft in command of the summit. Coke never made it to the summit himself, and there was a breakdown in communications which ultimately led to Thorneycroft being left to make the decision to withdraw.

=== Tugela Heights ===
A further attempt was made at the Battle of Vaal Krantz between 5 and 7 February, but Coke's brigade were in reserve during this; the Vaal Krantz ridge was taken, but it was decided that it didn't offer any tactical advantage, so another withdrawal was ordered.

On 14 February, Coke's brigade joined Barton's and Wynne's infantry brigades (the 6th and 11th brigades) along with the artillery in occupying Hussar Hill, which had been captured by the South African Light Horse.

== Later life ==
After returning home from the Boer War, Talbot Coke was placed on the retired list with honorary rank of major-general in March 1901. On 11 May 1907, he was appointed a deputy lieutenant of Derbyshire.

== Family ==
He was married on 14 November 1867 to Charlotte FitzGerald, a daughter of Major Henry Thomas George Fitzgerald and descendant of the ancient Earls of Desmond. They had three sons and four daughters. Their eldest son Edward Sacheverell D'Ewes Coke would become a brigadier general and their fifth child, a daughter named Charlotte Geraldine would marry Lieutenant general Thomas D'Oyly Snow KCB, KCMG.

Military offices
Preceded by	Commanding British troops in Mauritius ?–1899	Succeeded by Brigadier-General Charles Metcalfe
