= Swingometer =

Graphic used in UK election broadcasts

A view of the swingometer graphics used for the 2005 general election campaign, presented by Peter Snow.

The swingometer is a graphics device that shows the effects of the swing from one party to another on British election results television programmes. It is used to estimate the number of seats that will be won by different parties, given a particular national swing (in percentage points) in the vote towards or away from a given party, and assuming that that percentage change in the vote will apply in each constituency. The device was invented by Peter Milne, and later refined by David Butler and Robert McKenzie.

== History ==
The first outing on British television was during a regional output from the BBC studios in Bristol during the 1955 general election (the first UK general election to be televised) and was used to show the swing in the two constituencies of Southampton Itchen and Southampton Test.

Following this use in 1955, the BBC adopted the swingometer on a national basis and it was unveiled in the national broadcasts for the 1959 general election. This swingometer merely showed the national swing in Britain but not the implications on that swing on the composition of parliament. These issues were not addressed until the 1964 general election.

The swingometer for that election showed not only the national swing, but also the implications of that national swing. So for instance, a 3.5% swing to Labour would see Labour become a majority government whilst any swing to the Conservatives would see Sir Alec Douglas-Home reelected as Prime Minister with a huge parliamentary majority. In the end the result was a Labour overall majority of 4, and so when the 1966 general election came around, a new element had to be added (namely the prospect of a hung parliament).

At the 1970 general election, the swingometer entered the age of colour television and showed the traditional party colours of red for Labour and blue for Conservative and had to be extended due to the success of the Conservative party at that election.

However, following the success of the Liberals in the by-elections held between the 1970 and February 1974 general elections, the swingometer was reduced in scale to just a small standby as the computers used by the BBC were deemed more reliable. As the Liberal Party reduced in importance the swingometer was brought back for the 1979 general election but for the 1983 and 1987 general elections computers were introduced to show changes in support in both map and graphic form.

The swingometer was brought back for the 1992 general election covering the whole side of the election studio and also had to be manhandled by at least four technicians as well as Peter Snow who had taken over the election graphics role following the death of Bob McKenzie. This swingometer was too big for comfort and in 1997 started on a shrinking process and was changed from an actual swingometer to a virtual reality construct. For the 2001 general election the graphic was reduced further. Following a few experiments in the United Kingdom local elections in 2003 and 2004 the swingometer for the next election in 2005 was held on virtual structs as well as swingometers for the Labour and Liberal Democrats parties.

The redesigned swingometer, first used for the 2010 general election, presented by Jeremy Vine

An online version of the swingometer, featuring Labour and the Conservatives only, was introduced on the BBC News website at the 2001 general election. In 2005 the online swingometer was substantially re-designed to include versions featuring the Liberal Democrats, plus information on specific constituencies - including "VIP" seats - won/ lost on different swings. For the 2010 general election, the swingometer was placed in a completely virtual environment and repositioned to appear on the back wall of the virtual studio, with named constituencies as opposed to virtual MPs. All three swingometers were updated (Con / Lab, Con / Lib Dem, Lab / Lib Dem) in this manner.

== 3D swingometer ==
The 3D swingometer is used to illustrate the shift in election results from the previous election in a three-party system. It is similar to the "2D" swingometer used in two-party system elections, but uses the extra dimension to allow swings to occur among three parties.

The sum of all the swings between parties must equal zero. In a three party system, the most complicated swings will involve a major swing either to or from one political party, with this swing being made up of two components from each of the other two parties. For instance there may be a 3-point swing towards the Purple party, consisting of a 2-point swing from the Orange party and a 1-point swing from the Brown party. Alternatively, there may be a 5-point swing from the Orange party, of which 3 points are towards the Brown party and 2 towards the Purple party.

It is possible to split the swing space up into different regions indicating what the result would be if the swing indicated occurred linearly across the electorate. This gives rise to four regions: one each indicating overall control for each party, and a fourth region indicating no overall control.

Where there are swings directly from one party to a second party with the third party's vote remaining unchanged, the 3D swingometer clearly indicates that the third party also benefits slightly from the reduction in vote of the first party.

The three dimensions consist of the two used to create the swing space and the third for the pendulum to swing in.

== Parodies ==
During the 2010 UK General election race, the Slapometer website allowed voters to slap along to the live TV debates between party leaders Gordon Brown, David Cameron and Nick Clegg. Rather than showing a swing in votes it merely gave feedback about the number of slaps each politician was receiving each second.
