= BBC Studios Natural History Unit filmography =

This is a chronological list of selected television programmes and feature films produced or co-produced by the BBC Studios Natural History Unit since its inception in 1957. It is not intended to be exhaustive given the large amount of material the Unit has produced in its history, but it does capture all the major TV series and films for which it has gained recognition. A brief synopsis of pre-1957 BBC radio and television programmes on a natural history theme is given in the History section of the BBC Studios Natural History Unit article.

== Television productions ==
Series Title	Year(s) Broadcast	Subject	Contributors	Production Partners
Faraway Look	1957	Wildlife of Australasia	Peter and Philippa Scott (presenter)	
Eastwards with Attenborough	1973	Expedition to South East Asia	David Attenborough (presenter)	
Life on Earth	1979	The evolution of life	David Attenborough (presenter)	
The Living Planet	1984	How organisms adapt to their environment	David Attenborough (presenter)	
The Living Isles	1985	British wildlife	Julian Pettifer (presenter) and Peter Crawford (presenter)	
The First Eden	1987	A four-part natural history documentary presenting a portrait of the Mediterranean Sea and the lands around it	David Attenborough (narrator/presenter)	
Reefwatch	1988	A dive team broadcasts live from the northern Red Sea	Martha Holmes (presenter) and Tony Soper (presenter)	
Supersense	1988	Sensory perception in animals	Andrew Sachs (narrator)	
Land of the Eagle	1990	The Natural History & Colonisation of North America	Alan Ereira (narrator) and Peter Crawford (producer)	
The Trials of Life	1990	Animal behaviour	David Attenborough (presenter)	
Sea Trek	1991	Exploration of dive sites	Martha Holmes (presenter) and Mike deGruy (presenter)	
Lifesense	1991	Ground-breaking perception and precision in animals	Andrew Sachs (narrator)	
Realms of the Russian Bear	1992	Natural history of the former USSR states	Nikolai Drozdov (presenter)	
Life in the Freezer	1993	Natural history of Antarctica	David Attenborough (presenter) and Alastair Fothergill (producer)	
The Private Life of Plants	1995	A study of the plants	David Attenborough (presenter)	
Spirits of the Jaguar	1996	Natural History of Central America	Alan Ereira (narrator)	
Alien Empire	1996	A series looking at the world of the insects	John Shrapnel (narrator)	
Land of the Tiger	1997	Natural history of the Indian subcontinent	Valmik Thapar (presenter)	
Incredible Journeys	1997	Animal migration	Andrew Sachs (narrator) and Nigel Marven (producer)	
The Life of Birds	1998	A natural history of birds	David Attenborough (presenter)	
Earth Story	1998	Aubrey Manning finds out how old our planet is and what it looked like when it was newly formed.	Aubrey Manning (presenter)	
Supernatural	1999	Investigating extraordinary feats and strange powers of animals.	Andrew Sachs (narrator)	
Living Britain	1999	British natural history	Samuel West (narrator), Peter Crawford (producer)	
Andes to Amazon	2000	A portrait of South American landscapes and wildlife. Also known as Wild South America for the release.	Fergal Keane (narrator)	
State of the Planet	2000	The impact of humans on the natural world	David Attenborough (presenter)	
Predators	2000	The strategy and tactics that predators use to catch their prey.	John Hannah (narrator)	
Cousins	2000	Charlotte Uhlenbroek explores the world of the primates - our closest relatives.	Charlotte Uhlenbroek (presenter)	
Congo	2001	A portrait of the great central African river's, forests, and wildlife.	John Lynch (narrator) and Brian Leith (producer)	
The Blue Planet	2001	A natural history of the oceans. Also known as The Blue Planet: Seas of Life for North America release.	David Attenborough (narrator), Alastair Fothergill (producer)	
Wild Africa	2001	A portrait of Africa's landscapes and wildlife.	Fergal Keane (narrator)	
Ultimate Killers	2001	Hunting techniques of predators.	Steve Leonard (presenter)	
The Life of Mammals	2002	A natural history of mammals.	David Attenborough (presenter)	
Weird Nature	2002	Strange animal behavior	Ciaran McMenamin	
Talking with Animals	2002	A four-part series covering animal communication in various environments.	Charlotte Uhlenbroek (narrator)	
Animals - The Inside Story	2002	An exploration into the extremes of habitats where animals live, and even right inside their bodies to see how their physiology works.	Robert Lindsay (narrator)	
Wild New World	2002	Prehistory and wildlife of America from the arrival of humans to the end of the Ice Age. Also known as Prehistoric America for North America release.	Jack Fortune (narrator)	
Wild Weather	2002	A four-part series focusing on the extremes of wind, wet, cold and heat, and explore how these produce hurricanes, monsoons, ice storms and tornadoes, as well as regulate the global environment.	Donal MacIntyre (presenter)	
Monsters We Met	2003	A look at man's impact on landscapes and species	Ian Holm (narrator)	
Wild in Your Garden	2003	Garden wildlife.	Bill Oddie (presenter), Kate Humble (presenter), Simon King (presenter)	
Wild Down Under	2003	A portrait of Australasia's landscapes and wildlife. Also known as Wild Australasia for international release.	Matt Day (narrator)	
Jungle	2003	Wildlife of the world's rainforests.	Charlotte Uhlenbroek (presenter)	
The Nile	2004	The history and natural history of the Nile.	Simon MacCorkindale (presenter)	
Dragons Alive	2004	The natural history of the reptiles.	Lloyd Owen (narrator)	
Britain Goes Wild	2004	The coming of spring in Britain.	Bill Oddie (presenter), Kate Humble (presenter), Simon King (presenter)	
Massive Nature	2004	An epic run of nature documentaries charting the behaviour of large groups of animals and their predators.	Sean Pertwee (narrator)	
Animal Camera	2004	Steve Leonard investigates how new technology reveals the secrets of the animal world.	Steve Leonard (presenter)	
British Isles - A Natural History	2004	The natural history of the British Isles.	Alan Titchmarsh (presenter)	
Europe: A Natural History	2005	How European landscapes and wildlife have changed through time.	Sean Pertwee (narrator)	
Life in the Undergrowth	2005	A study of terrestrial invertebrates.	David Attenborough (presenter)	
Amazon Abyss	2005	An expedition team documents the underwater life of the Amazon.	Kate Humble (presenter) and Mike deGruy (presenter)	
Journey of Life	2005	A five-part series covering evolution on land, sea and air.	Steve Leonard (presenter)	
Elephant Diaries	2005, 2008	Wildlife series following the lives of a group of orphaned African bush elephants at the David Shelrick Wildlife Trust in Kenya.	Michaela Strachan & Jonathan Scott (presenters)	
Planet Earth	2006	A portrait of Earth's wildernesses and wildlife spectacles.	David Attenborough (narrator), Alastair Fothergill (producer)	
Galápagos	2006	A natural history of the Pacific islands.	Tilda Swinton (narrator)	
Planet Earth: The Future	2006	Highlighting the conservation issues surrounding some of the species and environments featured in Planet Earth.	Simon Poland (narrator), Fergus Beeley (producer)	
Ocean Odyssey	2006	A documentary looking at the ocean abyss and its bizarre creatures. The programme also traces the 80 year story of the largest predator ever to have evolved, the sperm whale.	Bernard Hill (narrator)	
Incredible Animal Journeys	2006	A six-part documentary series about some of the more amazing journeys taken by polar bears, whales, ospreys, wild dogs, bar-headed geese, and caribou.	Steve Leonard (narrator/presenter)	
Ganges	2007	A journey along the sacred river from the Himalayas to the Bay of Bengal.	Sudha Bhuchar (narrator)	
Expedition Borneo	2007	Wildlife adventure series following a team of explorers in the heart of the tropical island of Borneo.	Alisdair Simpson (narrator)	
Wild Caribbean	2007	A natural history of the Caribbean islands and Sea.	Steve Toussaint (narrator)	
Orangutan Diary	2007, 2009	Wildlife series following the work of the Borneo Orangutan Survival Foundation and the lives of a group of orphaned and rescued orangutans at the Nyaru Menteng Rehabilitation Centre.	Michaela Strachan (presenter), Steve Leonard (presenter)	
Saving Planet Earth	2007	A season of programmes dedicated to wildlife conservation.	David Attenborough (presenter), Alan Titchmarsh (presenter) and others	
The Nature of Britain	2007	A survey of British wildlife and habitats.	Alan Titchmarsh (presenter)	
Life in Cold Blood	2008	A series dedicated to reptiles and amphibians.	David Attenborough (presenter)	
Wild China	2008	The BBC's first natural history series dedicated to China.	Bernard Hill (narrator)	
Fossil Detectives	2008	An eight-part series in which Open University associate lecturer Dr. Hermione Cockburn leads a team of fossil experts and geologists around different regions of Britain to search for fossil treasures and mysteries.	Dr. Hermione Cockburn (presenter)	
Oceans	2008	Four marine experts explore the planet's oceans. They reveal the hidden stories of the deep through archaeology, geology, marine biology and anthropology.	Paul Rose (presenter), Phillipe Cousteau (presenter), Lucy Blue (presenter), Tooni Mahto (presenter)	
Nature's Great Events	2009	The world's principal seasonal changes and their impact on wildlife. Also known as Nature's Most Amazing Events for North America release.	David Attenborough (narrator)	
Yellowstone	2009	A year in the life of the animals of Yellowstone National Park.	Peter Firth (narrator)	
South Pacific	2009	Natural history of the islands of the South Pacific. Also known as Wild Pacific for North America release.	Benedict Cumberbatch (narrator)	
Life	2009	Blue-chip series looking at extraordinary animal behaviour from all parts of the natural world.	David Attenborough (narrator)	
The Secret Life of Elephants	2009	A three-part series revealing the emotional and dramatic lives of elephants in Kenya's Samburu National Reserve.	Sarah Parish (narrator)	
Living With Monkeys: Tales From the Treetops	2009	Adventurer Guy Grieve and primatologist Dr. Julie Anderson spend six weeks in the rainforest of Gabon, trying to save one of the world's rarest monkeys.	Guy Grieve (presenter), Dr. Julie Anderson (presenter)	
The Great Rift: Africa's Wild Heart	2010	A series looking at flora, fauna, and people of the Great Rift Valley.	Hugh Quarshie (narrator)	
Mountain Gorilla	2010	Intimate footage of Africa's few remaining mountain gorillas.	Patrick Stewart (narrator)	
Birds Britannia	2010	A series looking at the different birds that live in the UK, and the stories they can tell us about the British people over time.	Bill Paterson (narrator)	
Human Planet	2011	Mankind's relationship with nature in the world today.	John Hurt (narrator)	
Madagascar	2011	A natural history of Madagascar.	David Attenborough (presenter)	
Frozen Planet	2011	A seven-part survey of the polar regions.	David Attenborough (narrator/presenter) and Alastair Fothergill (producer)	
The Bear Family & Me	2011	Gordon Buchanan tries to gain the trust of a wild bear family in the American wilderness.	Gordon Buchanan (presenter)	
The Animal's Guide to Britain	2011	Chris Packham examines Britain from an animal's point of view as he tries to understand their needs.	Chris Packham (presenter)	
Ocean Giants	2011	A natural history of whales and dolphins.	Stephen Fry (narrator)	
Nature's Miracle Babies	2011	Zoologist Martin Hughes-Games travels the world to discover the plight of threatened species and meets the babies born against the odds.	Martin Hughes-Games (presenter)	
Great Barrier Reef	2012	Exploring Australia's Great Barrier Reef, the largest living structure on our planet.	Monty Halls (presenter)	
Super Smart Animals	2012	Animal intelligence	Liz Bonnin (presenter)	
Land of the Lost Wolves	2012	Two-part natural history series following the fortunes of one very special pack of wolves as they return to North America's West Coast.	Gordon Buchanan (presenter)	
Planet Earth Live	2012	Series featuring live wildlife footage from across the globe. Also known as 24/7 Wild for international release.	Julia Bradbury and Richard Hammond (presenter)	
Secrets of Our Living Planet	2012	Biodiversity, ecosystems and the complex relationships between plants and animals. Also known as How Nature Works for international release.	Chris Packham (presenter)	
Nature's Microworlds	2012–2013	Nature series which looks at some of the world's most iconic ecosystems	Steve Backshall (narrator)	
A Year in the Wild	2012	The landscapes and wildlife of some of Britain's most iconic National Parks, seen through the eyes of people who know them best.	Hermione Norris (narrator)	
The Dark: Nature's Nighttime World	2012	An expedition team films nocturnal creatures in Central and South America.	Andy Serkis (narrator), Gordon Buchanan (presenter), George McGavin (presenter) and Justine Evans (presenter)	
Planet Earth Specials	2012	The real-life stories of individual young animals growing up in the wild.	Julia Bradbury (narrator)	
Attenborough: 60 Years in the Wild	2012	Over three very personal films, David Attenborough looks back at the unparalleled changes in natural history that he has witnessed during his 60-year career.	David Attenborough (presenter)	
Africa	2013	A six-part series that explores wildlife in Africa.	David Attenborough (narrator/presenter)	
The Polar Bear Family & Me	2013	Wildlife cameraman Gordon Buchanan follows a wild polar bear family over three seasons in Svalbard.	Gordon Buchanan (presenter)	
Wild Arabia	2013	A three-part series that explores the Arabian wildlife, landscape and people.	Alexander Siddig (narrator)	
Wild Burma: Nature's Lost Kingdom	2013	Scientists and film-makers travel to Burma to survey endangered wildlife, the first such expedition in 50 years.	Paterson Joseph (narrator), Gordon Buchanan (presenter), Ross Piper (presenter), Justine Evans (presenter)	
Great Bear Stakeout	2013	Deep in Alaska an expert team of film-makers follow the lives of grizzly bears.	Billy Connolly (narrator)	
Ice Age Giants	2013	A three-part series about the great beasts of the Ice Age in North America and Europe.	Alice Roberts (presenter)	
Operation Snow Tiger	2013	Liz Bonnin helps conservationists find and protect three orphaned tiger cubs, while also looking at how tigers can be protected in the Russian wilderness.	Liz Bonnin (presenter)	
The Great British Year	2013	A portrait of the dynamic nature of Britain over the course of one year. Also known as Wild Kingdom for international release.	Joseph Fiennes (narrator)	
Animal Odd Couples	2013	Why animals of different species make friends with each other, and even with humans.	Liz Bonnin (presenter)	
Wild Brazil	2014	Series documenting the lives of Brazil's most charismatic animals: jaguars, giant otters, coatis and tufted capuchins. Also known as Brazil Gone Wild for North America release.	Stephen Mangan (narrator)	
Hidden Kingdoms	2014	Dramatized documentary series showing how diminutive animals experience the world from their perspective. Also known as Mini Monsters for Discovery Channel release.	Stephen Fry (narrator)	
24 Hours on Earth	2014	A two-part series of a day in the life of our planet.	Matthew Macfadyen (narrator)	
Life Story	2014	A six-part series following specific animals from birth to parenthood.	David Attenborough (narrator/presenter)	
Monkey Planet	2014	A global survey of the primate order.	George McGavin (presenter)	
Inside the Animal Mind	2014	Three part series that looks at how animals perceive and interact with the world.	Chris Packham (presenter)	
Secrets of Bones	2014	A six-part series looking at the bones of animals.	Ben Garrod (presenter)	
Tigers About the House	2014	A programme following Giles Clark as he helps to bring up two young tiger cubs in his home.	Giles Clark	
The Wonder of Animals	2014	Series takes a in-depth look at nature's winners to reveal the secret of animals success.	Chris Packham (presenter)	
Super Senses: The Secret Power of Animals	2014	A three-part series exploring the extraordinary world of animal senses.	Helen Czerski and Patrick Aryee (presenters)	
Nature's Miracle Orphans	2014, 2016	Observational documentary series following orphaned baby animals and the dedicated people that rescue, rehabilitate and release them back into the wild.	Ellie Harrison (presenter), Max Hug Williams (presenter), Lucy Cooke (presenter), Patrick Aryee (presenter)	
Wonders of the Monsoon	2014	A five-part series exploring the effect of the monsoon on the wildlife of the Indian subcontinent and South East Asia. Also known as Lands of the Monsoon for international release.	Colin Salmon (narrator)	
Snow Wolf Family & Me	2014	Gordon Buchanan travels to the remote Canadian Arctic in search of wolves that have never seen people.	Gordon Buchanan (presenter)	
Alaska: Earth's Frozen Kingdom	2015	A three-part series that looks at a year in Alaska, revealing the stories of pioneering Alaskans, both animal and human, as they battle the elements. Also known as Wild Alaska for international release.	Dougray Scott (narrator)	
Shark	2015	A three-part series on over thirty species of shark which shows how they hunt, their intricate social lives, courtship, growing up and the threats they face.	Paul McGann (narrator)	
Japan: Earth's Enchanted Islands	2015	A three-part series about the natural world and wildlife of Japan's islands: Honshu, Hokkaido and the southernmost Islands. Also known as Wild Japan for international release.	Michelle Dockery (narrator)	
World's Weirdest Events	2015	A series that explores the unexplained, the unexpected and the unidentifiable events of the natural world. Also known as Weird Wonders for BBC America and Weird Wonders of the World for international release.	Chris Packham (presenter)	
Animals in Love	2015	A two-part series about animal relationships.	Liz Bonnin (presenter)	
Hidden India	2015	A three-part BBC series showcasing various facets of the rivers, mountains and wildlife of remote areas of India.	Geraldine James (narrator)	
Nature's Greatest Dancers	2015	A two-part series exploring the flamboyant, eye-catching and sometimes bizarre world of slick animal movers.	Steve Backshall (narrator)	
Animal Super Parents	2015	A two-part series revealing the weird and wonderful stories of some of the natural world's most incredible parents.	Hugh Dennis (narrator)	
Atlantic: The Wildest Ocean on Earth	2015	A three-part series exploring the Atlantic Ocean that stretches nearly 10,000 miles, from Arctic to Antarctic and from sun-drenched tropical reefs to crushing abyssal depths. Also known as Wild Atlantic for European release.	Cillian Murphy (narrator)	
Earth's Natural Wonders	2015, 2018	Series which explores natural wonders and examines what it takes to survive in some of the most extreme places on the planet.	Olivia Colman (narrator, Series 1), Sophie Okonedo (narrator, Series 2)	
Big Blue Live	2015	Series celebrates a wildlife success story and marine animal phenomenon in Monterey Bay, California. Also known as Big Blue: Monterey Bay for international release.	Hugh Fearnley-Whittingstall (presenter), Steve Backshall (presenter), Liz Bonnin (presenter), Matt Baker (presenter)	
Big Blue UK	2015	Hugh Fearnley-Whittingstall and a team of marine enthusiasts follow the animals arriving and thriving in UK waters.	Hugh Fearnley-Whittingstall (presenter), Lindsey Chapman (presenter), Richard Taylor-Jones (presenter)	
India: Nature's Wonderland	2015	Two-part series which travels to land of stunning wildlife, ancient cultures and extreme landscapes of India.	Liz Bonnin (presenter), Freida Pinto (presenter), Jon Gupta (presenter)	
Patagonia: Earth's Secret Paradise	2015	A three-part series exploring the landscapes and wildlife of Patagonia. Also known as Wild Patagonia for international release.	Santiago Cabrera (narrator)	
Earth's Wildest Waters: The Big Fish	2015	Series follows the eight British fishermen by using their skills to the limit in six epic fishing locations across the world. Also known as The Big Catch for international release.	Ben Fogle (presenter)	
Gorilla Family & Me	2015	Gordon Buchanan travels to the Democratic Republic of Congo to meet a family of rare Grauer's gorillas.	Gordon Buchanan (presenter)	
Wild West: America's Great Frontier	2016	Three-part series which explores the ways nature has found to survive in the extremely testing land of the wild west. Also known as Wild West for international release.	James Norton (narrator)	
Planet Earth II	2016	Series explores the unique characteristics of jungles, deserts, mountains, islands, grasslands and cities of Earth's most iconic habitats, and the ways animals survive within them.	David Attenborough (narrator/presenter)	
Earth's Greatest Spectacles	2016	Set in three of the most seasonally changeable landscapes on earth, revealing the processes that occur each year and showing how wildlife adapts to cope. Also known as Seasonal Wonderlands for international release.	Domhnall Gleeson (narrator)	
Life in the Air	2016	Documentary series exploring the animals from around the world that take to the air. Also known as SuperNature - Wild Flyers for PBS release.	Suranne Jones (narrator)	
Into the Wild	2016	Gordon Buchanan takes some well-known UK public figures on a wildlife adventure where they get up close and personal with some of the UK's most iconic species.	Gordon Buchanan (presenter)	
Nature's Epic Journeys	2016	Series follows iconic animals on three of the world's most breathtaking wildlife adventures. Each must overcome immense obstacles, from challenging terrain to hungry predators and sheer physical exhaustion. Also known as Nature's Great Migrations for international release, and Nature's Great Race for PBS release.	Liz Bonnin (presenter)	
New Zealand: Earth's Mythical Islands	2016	A three-part series which explores New Zealand's wildlife that has resulted from 80 million years of isolation. Also known as Wild New Zealand for international release.	Sam Neill (narrator)	
Earth's Seasonal Secrets	2016	Series follows how each of the four seasons transforms to the world. Also known as Earth's Great Seasons for international release.	Andrew Scott (narrator)	
Ingenious Animals	2016	A team of wildlife experts travel the globe in search of the most surprising animal stories and reveal how and why animals do such remarkable things.	Hugh Fearnley-Whittingstall (presenter), Patrick Aryee (presenter), Giles Clark (presenter), Lucy Cooke (presenter)	
Animal Babies	2016	Three-part series follows young animals as they take their first steps and face their earliest challenges.	Gordon Buchanan (narrator)	
Elephant Family & Me	2016	Gordon Buchanan follows a herd of elephants in the Kenyan wilderness.	Gordon Buchanan (presenter)	
World's Sneakiest Animals	2016	A series covering cheating behavior in animals, and how simple tricks have evolved into complex deceptions. Also known as Natural Born Hustlers for international and PBS release.	Chris Packham (presenter)	
Galápagos	2017	A series following a scientific expedition across the Galápagos Islands to carry out research that will help protect the islands and their inhabitants. Also known as Mission Galapagos for international release.	Liz Bonnin (narrator/presenter, UK version), Mark Bonnar (narrator, International version)	
Mexico: Earth's Festival of Life	2017	Three-part series which explores the wildlife, landscape, and culture in three distinct worlds within Mexico - mountain ranges, tropical forests and deserts. Also known as Wild Mexico for international release, and Wonders of Mexico for PBS release.	Eliud Gabriel Porra (narrator)	
Mountain: Life at the Extreme	2017	Three-part series about the animals and people who make a home on the mountain ranges of the Rockies, Himalayas, and Andes. Also known as Mountains: Life Above the Clouds for international release, and Kingdoms of the Sky for PBS release.	Dougie Henshall (narrator)	
Blue Planet II	2017	From the intense heat of the tropics to the frozen poles, from the coastlines to the darkest parts of the ocean, the series explores different marine worlds and the challenges they present for the creatures that live there.	David Attenborough (narrator/presenter)	
Thailand: Earth's Tropical Paradise	2017	Three-part series exploring the tropical wilderness of Thailand. Also known as Wild Thailand for international release.	Sophie Okonedo (narrator)	
Yellowstone: Wildest Winter to Blazing Summer	2017	Covers a year in Yellowstone National Park, and how wildlife adapts to the harsh seasonal changes. Also known as The Great American Thaw for international release, and Great Yellowstone Thaw for PBS release.	Kate Humble (presenter) and Patrick Aryee (presenter)	
Down the Mighty River	2017	Steve Backshall sets out to explore the Baliem River in the island of New Guinea. Also known as Steve Backshall's Extreme River Challenge for international release.	Steve Backshall (presenter)	
Wild Alaska Live	2017	A live-broadcast series about the congregation of wildlife in Alaska for the bountiful summer season.	Steve Backshall (presenter), Liz Bonnin (presenter), Matt Baker (presenter)	
Wild UK	2017	A live-broadcast series exploring the wilderness of the UK and the wildlife that thrives there. This is a companion program to Wild Alaska Live.	Colin Stafford Johnson (presenter), Lucy Cooke (presenter)	
Tribes, Predators & Me	2017	Gordon Buchanan follows the world's most remote tribes to observe how they live alongside nature's most deadly predators. Also known as Tribes, Animals & Me for international release.	Gordon Buchanan (presenter)	
Dynasties	2018	Series focuses on five animals, where each animal battles against the odds for the future of their families.	David Attenborough (narrator/presenter)	
Big Cats	2018	Three-part series uncovering the secret lives of big cats. Also known as Super Cats for PBS release.	Bertie Carvel (narrator)	
Animals with Cameras	2018, 2021	Wildlife cameraman Gordon Buchanan joins with scientists to put cameras on animals. Together, they make extraordinary discoveries about the lives of some of the planet's most fascinating species.	Gordon Buchanan (presenter)	
Big Cats About the House	2018	A three-part series follows Giles Clark - where he embarks with the life at the Big Cat Sanctuary in Kent.	Andrew Lincoln (narrator), Giles Clark (participant)	
Animals Behaving Badly	2018	A series about the behaviours and methods animals use to find a mate and raise a family. Also known as Natural Born Rebels for international and PBS release.	Liz Bonnin (presenter)	
Extraordinary Rituals	2018	A series which explores the spectacular and emotional world of rituals. Also known as Rituals for international release.	Simon Reeve (narrator, UK version), Matthew Gravelle (narrator, International version)	
Grizzly Bear Cubs & Me	2018	Two-part programme where Gordon Buchanan helps to rehabilitate orphaned baby grizzly bears into the Russian wilderness.	Gordon Buchanan (presenter)	
Cities: Nature's New Wild	2018 - 2019	Three-part programme which explores the ways wildlife is adapting to life in the world's cities. Also known as Wild Metropolis for international and PBS release.	Daniel Kaluuya (narrator)	
Earth From Space	2019	In this four-part series, cameras in space tell stories of life on our planet from a brand new perspective, revealing new discoveries, incredible colours and patterns, and just how fast it is changing. Also known as Life From Above for PBS release.	Chiwetel Ejiofor (narrator)	
Seven Worlds, One Planet	2019	A series which focuses on the climates, wildlife, and spectacles of each of Earth's seven continents.	David Attenborough (narrator)	
Earth's Great Rivers	2019	Three-part series about the wildlife, landscapes, and humans of the Amazon, Mississippi and Nile rivers. Also known as Rivers of Life for PBS release.	David Oyelowo (narrator)	
Australia: Earth's Magical Kingdom	2019	Three-part series about Australian wildlife.	Barry Humphries (narrator)	
Blue Planet Live	2019	A live-broadcast celebration of marine life around the globe, as well as explorations of the health of Earth's oceans. Also known as Blue Planet Revisited for international release.	Chris Packham, Steve Backshall, Liz Bonnin (presenters)	
Blue Planet UK	2019	A live-broadcast series about marine life from all corners of the UK, and about the health of Earth's oceans. This is a companion program to Blue Planet Live.	Chris Packham, Gillian Burke, Steve Brown (presenters)	
Big Animal Surgery	2019	A series about medical procedures performed on some of the biggest animals in the world.	Liz Bonnin (presenter)	
Animal Babies: First Year on Earth	2019	A three part series looking at how baby animals cope when they are young, and how they develop to reach key milestones.	Wunmi Mosaku (narrator), Sue Gibson (presenter), Vianet Djenguet (presenter), Colin Stafford-Johnson (presenter)	
Animals at Play	2019	A series about animal "playtime" behaviour.	Gordon Buchanan (narrator)	
Secrets of Skin	2019	A six-part series about vertebrate skin, specifically covering adaptability, movement, protection, communication, defence, and sensory perception.	Ben Garrod (presenter)	
Snow Cats & Me	2019	Rescue and rehabilitation of lynx from the fur and pet trades back to into the wild.	Gordon Buchanan (presenter)	
Earth's Tropical Islands	2020	Exploring some of the world's most isolated tropical islands.	David Harewood (narrator)	
Baby Chimp Rescue	2020	A three-part series documenting the efforts of a rescue center for chimpanzees in Liberia.	Ben Garrod (presenter)	
Blue Planet Revisited	2020	A 2-part series focusing on threatened ecosystems in the oceans—specifically sharks in the Bahamas, and Australia's Great Barrier Reef.	Steve Backshall (presenter), Liz Bonnin (presenter)	
Primates	2020	A three-part documentary series about primates, and the strategies monkeys, apes and lemurs utilize to survive.	Chris Packham (narrator)	
A Wild Year	2020	A yearlong study of the nature of three regions of the British countryside—the Pembrokeshire coast, the fens of East Anglia, the North York Moors.	Toby Jones (narrator)	
Bears About the House	2020	Conservationist Giles Clark travels to Laos to help take care of care of Sun and Moon bear cubs.	Giles Clark (presenter), Andrew Lincoln (narrator)	
Iolo: The Last Wilderness of Wales	2020	Iolo Williams tracks wildlife in the Cambrian Mountains.	Iolo Williams (presenter)	
Mindful Escapes: Breathe, Release, Restore	2020	A four part series featuring relaxing sequences of the natural world.	Andy Puddicombe (Narrator)	
Waterhole: Africa's Animal Oasis	2020	A three-part series exploring the oases in the Mwiba Wildlife Reserve in Tanzania where elephants, lions, leopards and hundreds of other species meet and compete for water.	Chris Packham (presenter), Ella Al-Shamahi (presenter)	
Eden: Untamed Planet	2021	A six-part series focusing on isolated regions, largely undisturbed by human interference.	Helena Bonham Carter (narrator)	
Cheetah Family & Me	2021	Gordon Buchanan gets close to wild cheetah in the Kalahari, experiencing first hand the dangers these big cats face.	Gordon Buchanan (presenter)	
Chris Packham's Animal Einsteins	2021	A series about animal intelligence, and the strategies that give certain species the upper hand.	Chris Packham (presenter)	
Our Wild Adventures	2021	An 8-part retrospective through the natural history archives with some of the BBC's favourite wildlife presenters, as they share a few of their most memorable wild adventures.	Gordon Buchanan (presenter), Sue Gibson (presenter), Steve Backshall (presenter), Vianet Djenguet (presenter), Chris Packham (presenter), Liz Bonnin (presenter), Colin Stafford-Johnson (presenter), George McGavin (presenter)	
Chris and Meg's Wild Summer	2021	Wildlife presenters Chris Packham and stepdaughter Megan McCubbin go on a road trip featuring animal encounters, landscapes and time to reflect on their relationship.	Chris Packham (presenter), Megan McCubbin (presenter)	
The Green Planet	2022	A 5-part documentary series exploring plants and their relationship with animals, humans, and the environment.	David Attenborough (narrator/presenter)	
Prehistoric Planet	2022, 2023	A 5-part documentary series following dinosaurs and other prehistoric animals recreated with computer-generated imagery, living around the globe in the Late Cretaceous period 66 million years ago (Maastrichtian), just before the dinosaurs' extinction.	David Attenborough (narrator/presenter) and Jon Favreau (executive producer)	
Dynasties II	2022	A 6-part series which delves into the lives of animals as they fight for their families against the odds. Sequel to 2018's Dynasties.	David Attenborough (presenter/narrator)	
Frozen Planet II	2022	Sir David Attenborough explores a planet on the brink of major change as nature finds a way to survive and thrive in the frozen reaches of the planet. Sequel to 2011's Frozen Planet.	David Attenborough (presenter/narrator)	
Dogs in the Wild: Meet the Family	2022	A series about canines, and how they have adapted to a wide variety of Earth's climates.	Chris Packham (narrator)	
Earth's Great Rivers II	2022	Three-part series about the wildlife, landscapes, and humans of the Danube, Yukon, and Zambezi rivers. Sequel to 2019's Earth's Great Rivers.		
Earth	2023	The story of our home planet.	Chris Packham (presenter)	
Planet Earth III	2023	Sequel to Planet Earth and Planet Earth II	David Attenborough (narrator)	
Wild Scandinavia	2023	Three-part series exploring the Scandinavian wilderness, featuring lynx, orcas, puffins and wolves, among other species.	Rebecca Ferguson (narrator)	
Big Little Journeys	2023		Aaron Pierre (narrator)	
Mammals	2024	Twenty-two years after The Life of Mammals, David Attenborough revisits how mammals have conquered the Earth.	David Attenborough (presenter)	
OceanXplorers	2024	A 6-part series for National Geographic, co-produced with James Cameron and OceanX		
Asia	2024	The BBC's first natural history series devoted to the continent of Asia.	David Attenborough (narrator)	
Big Cats 24/7	2024, 2026	A film crew follow the lives of lions, leopards and cheetahs in Botswana's Okavango Delta	Filmed and presented by Brad Bestelink, Gordon Buchanan, Anna Dimitriadis, Vianet Djenguet and Greg Hartman	
The Secret Lives of Animals	2024	10-part series for Apple TV+	Hugh Bonneville (narrator)	
The Americas	2025	A ten-part documentary series devoted to the Americas. Co-production between the BBC and NBCUniversal.	Tom Hanks (narrator)	
Kingdom	2025	Series following the lives of four rival animal families — lions, leopards, African wild dogs, and hyenas — living in the Nsefu sector of South Luangwa National Park in Zambia	David Attenborough (narrator)	
Tiger Island	2026			
Lion	2026	Co-production between the BBC and National Geographic.	Jon Favreau (executive producer)	
Blue Planet III	2026	A sequel to The Blue Planet and Blue Planet II	David Attenborough (narrator)	

== Single-running television productions ==
Programme Title	Year	Subject	Contributors	Format	Broadcast
Lonesome George and the Battle for Galapagos	2007	The story of Lonesome George, the last Pinta Island giant tortoise, who became a global symbol for conservation efforts in the Galápagos Islands following his discovery in 1971.	Tilda Swinton (narrator)	1x60'	BBC Four
Bill Oddie's Top Ten Birds	2007	Bill Oddie counts down the UK's ten most popular and most villainous birds in a light-hearted guide to our feathered friends and foes.	Bill Oddie (presenter)	1x60'	BBC Four
Decade of Discovery	2010	Chris Packham presents a profile of his ten favourite new species discovered in the past decade.	Chris Packham (presenter)	1x60'	BBC Two
Attenborough and the Giant Egg	2011	David Attenborough tells the story of a 1960s film trip to Madagascar during which he reconstructed the egg of a giant elephant bird.	David Attenborough (presenter)	1x60'	BBC Two
Woolly Mammoth: Secrets from the Ice	2012	Alice Roberts reveals the natural history of the woolly mammoth, an extinct ice age giant. Also known as Ice Age Giants: Woolly Mammoths: Secrets from the Ice for the US broadcast.	Alice Roberts (presenter)	1x60'	BBC Two
Miniature Britain	2012	George McGavin travels around Britain investigating the lives of microscopic creatures and their impact on the wider environment.	George McGavin (presenter)	1x60'	BBC One
Ultimate Swarms	2013	George McGavin looks at how and why animals swarm together.	George McGavin (presenter)	1x60'	BBC One
Attenborough's Paradise Birds	2015	David Attenborough tells the story of the birds of paradise. He explores the myths surrounding their discovery 500 years ago, the latest discoveries about their behaviour and the scientific truth behind their beauty.	David Attenborough (presenter)	1x60'	BBC Two
Super Cute Animals	2015	Gordon Buchanan seeks to understand why humans find some animals to be cute and looks at how their features help them to survive.	Gordon Buchanan (presenter)	1x60'	BBC One
Animals Unexpected	2015	A programme investigating how animals can adapt to new environments and thrive as invasive species.	Lucy Cooke (presenter)	1x60'	BBC One
Attenborough and the Giant Dinosaur	2016	The excavation of fossil remains of a gigantic dinosaur in southern Argentina. Also known as Raising the Dinosaur Giant for the PBS Nature broadcast in the US.	David Attenborough (presenter)	1x60'	BBC One
Wild Tales from the Village	2016	A year in the life of a secluded village in rural France, showing the parallel world of the tiny creatures that live side by side with unsuspecting humans.	Tcheky Karyo (narrator)	1x60'	BBC Two
Life in the Snow	2016	Gordon Buchanan profiles a selection of animals that live in cold winter climates.	Gordon Buchanan (presenter)	1x60'	BBC One
Life in Polar Bear Town with Gordon Buchanan	2016	Gordon Buchanan travels to the town of Churchill on the shores of Canada's Hudson Bay, where packs of polar bears gather each autumn for their winter hunt.	Gordon Buchanan (presenter)	1x60'	BBC Two
The Lake District: A Wild Year	2017	Innovative filming techniques give a new and unique perspective on a turbulent year in the life of England's Lake District National Park.	Bernard Cribbins (narrator)	1x60'	BBC Two
Super Small Animals	2017	Biologist Patrick Aryee explores the evolutionary advantages that make small animals successful, from a little lemur to a tiny armadillo.	Patrick Aryee (presenter)	1x60'	BBC One
Winter's Weirdest Events	2017	Chris Packham explain some of the natural world's strangest winter events.	Chris Packham (presenter)	1x30'	BBC Two
Reindeer Family and Me	2017	Gordon Buchanan travels deep inside the Arctic Circle to meet the ancient Sámi people and the animals they live alongside - reindeer.	Gordon Buchanan (presenter)	1x60'	BBC Two
Attenborough and the Sea Dragon	2018	David Attenborough explores the case of a newly discovered ichthyosaur - a giant "sea dragon" that hunted in the oceans during the age of the dinosaurs.	David Attenborough (writer and presenter)	1x60'	BBC One
Planet Earth: A Celebration	2020	A compilation of footage from the BBC's Planet Earth II and Blue Planet II series, set to a new orchestral score by composers Hans Zimmer and Jacob Shea.	David Attenborough (narrator)	1x60'	BBC One
Penguins: Meet the Family	2020	Liz Bonnin profiles the penguin family, with archive footage showing all 18 species in their natural habitats across the Southern Hemisphere.	Liz Bonnin (narrator)	1x60'	BBC One
The Year Earth Changed	2021	A programme about the COVID-19 pandemic and its impact on nature. It focusses on changes observed in wild animal behaviours during public health lockdowns and travel restrictions from the onset of the pandemic in 2020.	David Attenborough (narrator)	1x48'	Apple TV+
Lion: The Rise and Fall of the Marsh Pride	2022	The long history of the Maasai Mara's most famous lion pride, filmed by the BBC and other broadcasters for 40 years.	Simon King, Jackson Looseyia and Jonathan Scott (interviewees)	1x90'	BBC Two
Fantastic Beasts: A Natural History	2022	Stephen Fry reveals the stories behind some of the world’s best-known mythical beasts.	Stephen Fry (presenter)	1x60'	BBC One
Attenborough and the Giant Sea Monster	2024	David Attenborough follows the discovery of the giant fossil of a prehistoric Jurassic predator on the south coast of England.	David Attenborough (presenter)	1x60'	BBC One
Expedition Killer Whale	2024	Scientists and filmmakers document the sophisticated hunting techniques of orcas in the Southern Ocean.	Sharon D Clarke (narrator)	1x60'	BBC Two

== Long-running television productions ==
Series Title	Year(s) Broadcast	Subject	Contributors	DVD Release (Note: DVD & Blu Ray available at Amazon UK (Region 2).)	Video Download (Note: Video download available at iTunes UK, Amazon UK Instant Video, Microsoft Store UK or PlayStation Store UK.)
Zoo Quest	1954-1963	David Attenborough travels to exotic locations in a bid to find rare and unusual animals.	David Attenborough		
Look	1955–1969	Weekly magazine show	Peter Scott (introduced by), Desmond Hawkins (producer), Tony Soper (producer) and Jeffery Boswall (producer)	No	No
On Safari	1957–1965	Filming animals in East Africa	Armand and Michaela Denis (presenter)	No	No
Undersea World of Adventure	1958–1960	Sea life	Hans and Lotte Hass (presenter) and Tony Soper (producer)	No	No
Animal Magic	1962–1983	Weekly magazine show for children	Johnny Morris (presenter)	No	No
Adventure	1961–1965	David Attenborough travel documentary.	David Attenborough (presenter)	No	No
Private Lives	1967–1970	Series on individual species including kingfisher, cuckoo and fox	Jeffery Boswall (producer)	No	No
The World About Us	1967–1983	Weekly blue-chip documentary strand featuring NHU content	Various	No	No
Wildlife on One	1977–2005	Weekly series profiling different animals	David Attenborough (narrator)	No	No
Natural World	1983–2020	Weekly blue-chip documentary strand	Various	Yes	No
The Really Wild Show	1986–2006	Weekly magazine show for children	Terry Nutkins (presenter), Chris Packham (presenter), Michaela Strachan (presenter) and others	No	No
The Wildlife Specials	1995–2007	One-off profiles of individual species	David Attenborough (narrator)	Yes	No
Big Cat Diary; Big Cat Week; Big Cat Live	1996–2008	Family lives of the Masai Mara's lions, leopards and cheetahs	Jonathan Scott (presenter), Simon King (presenter) and Saba Douglas-Hamilton (presenter) and others	Yes	No
Birding with Bill Oddie	1997–2000	Birdwatching in the UK and abroad	Bill Oddie (presenter)	No	No
Bill Oddie Goes Wild	2001–2003	Watching British wildlife	Bill Oddie (presenter)	No	No
Wild	2001–2009	Series of wildlife and nature documentaries with access to never-before-seen footage.	Various	No	No
Wild Battlefields	2002–2003	How lions, polar bears, tiger sharks and wolves hunt their prey	Sanjeev Bhaskar (narrator)	No	No
Abyss; Amazon Abyss; Pacific Abyss	2002–2008	Expeditions exploring the deep oceans, the Amazon River and the seas of Micronesia	Kate Humble (presenter) and Mike deGruy (presenter)	No	No
Bill Oddie's How to Watch Wildlife	2005–2006	Watching British wildlife	Bill Oddie (presenter)	Yes	No
Coast	2005–2013	Journeying around Britain's coastline (additional material by the NHU)	Nicholas Crane (presenter) and Neil Oliver (presenter)	Yes	No
Springwatch; Autumnwatch; Winterwatch	2005–present	Observing British wildlife in spring, autumn and winter	Bill Oddie (presenter), Kate Humble (presenter), Simon King (presenter), Chris Packham (presenter), Martin Hughes-Games (presenter), Michaela Strachan (presenter) and others	No	No
Lost Land of the Jaguar; Lost Land of the Volcano; Lost Land of the Tiger	2008–2010	An expedition team explores various things	Steve Backshall (presenter), Gordon Buchanan (presenter), Justine Evans (presenter) and George McGavin (presenter)	Yes	No
Deadly 60	2009–present	Children's series tracking the world's deadliest animals	Steve Backshall (presenter)	Yes	No
Nature's Weirdest Events	2012-2017	Investigations into strange happenings in the natural world	Chris Packham (presenter)	Yes (Note: Series 1 only available on DVD and iTunes Store UK.)	Yes
David Attenborough's Natural Curiosities	2013-2017	David Attenborough looks at some of the strange behaviours and appearances in the animal kingdom and explains how they came to be and what purposes they have.	David Attenborough (presenter)	Yes	Yes

== Feature film productions ==
Series Title	Year(s) Broadcast	Subject	Contributors	DVD Release	Video Download
Deep Blue	2003	Feature-length version of The Blue Planet TV series.	Pierce Brosnan (narrator), Alastair Fothergill (director)	Yes	No
Earth	2007	Feature-length version of the Planet Earth TV series.	James Earl Jones (narrator), Alastair Fothergill (director), Mark Linfield (director)	Yes	No
The Meerkats	2008	Follows the daily struggles for survival of a meerkat clan in the Kalahari Desert.	Paul Newman (narrator), James Honeyborne (director)	Yes	No
One Life	2011	Feature-length version of the Life TV series.	Daniel Craig (narrator), Michael Gunton (director), Martha Holmes (director)	Yes	No
Wings	2014	Feature-length version of the Earthflight TV series. Also known as Winged Planet.	David Tennant (narrator)	Yes	No
Tiny Giants	2014	Feature-length version of the Hidden Kingdoms TV series.	Stephen Fry (narrator), Michael Gunton (producer), Mark Brownlow (producer & director)	Yes	No
Enchanted Kingdom	2014	Follows on a spell-binding journey through seven realms of Africa to reveal a natural world stranger, more magical, and more mystical than anything that people might imagine.	Idris Elba (narrator), Patrick Morris (director), Neil Nightingale (producer & director)	Yes	No
Wild Africa	2015	Follows with a spectacular trip through the most varied regions of the African continent: which gives a striking account of the impact of water on wild Africa and its animals.	Helena Bonham Carter (narrator), Patrick Morris (director), Mike Slee (director), Neil Nightingale (producer & director)	Yes	No
Shark: A 4D Experience	2015	Feature-length version of Shark TV series.		No	No
Earthflight	2016	Film follows with an incredible flight across the world on the wings of birds.	Cate Blanchett (narrator)	No	No
Incredible Predators	2016	Feature-length version of The Hunt TV series.	Alastair Fothergill (director)	No	No
Earth: One Amazing Day	2017	Feature-length (1h 35m) version of the Planet Earth II TV series.	Robert Redford (narrator), Peter Webber (director), Lixin Fan (director), Richard Dale (director)	Yes	No
Oceans: Our Blue Planet	2018	Feature-length (40m) version of Blue Planet II. Embark on a global odyssey to discover the largest and least explored habitat on earth. New ocean science and technology has allowed us to go further into the unknown than we ever thought possible.	Kate Winslet (narrator), Mark Brownlow & Rachel Butler (directors)	Yes	No
Cuba: Journey to the Heart of the Caribbean	2019		Peter H. Chang (director)		
Antarctica: Into The Unknown	2021		Benedict Cumberbatch (narrator), Fredi Davas (director)		
Arctic: Our Frozen Planet	2023	Feature-length version of the Frozen Planet II TV series.	Benedict Cumberbatch (narrator), Rachel Scott (director)		
Wild Asia: Life at Extremes	2026	Feature-length version of the Asia TV series.			

== See also ==
- Nature documentary
- BBC Atlas of the Natural World, a 2006-07 DVD compilation series for North America
