= Saving Planet Earth =

- Promotional image
- Genre: Nature documentary Telethon
- Presented by: See episodes for detail
- Country of origin: United Kingdom
- Original language: English
- No. of episodes: 11

Production
- Executive producer: Sara Ford
- Producers: Paul Appleby; Lucy Bowden
- Running time: 30 minutes
- Production company: BBC Natural History Unit

Original release
- Network: BBC One; BBC Two; CBBC
- Release: 24 June – 6 July 2007

Saving Planet Earth is a season of nature documentaries with a conservation theme, screened on BBC Television in 2007 to mark the 50th anniversary of its specialist factual department, the BBC Natural History Unit.

The series featured films contributed by a number of celebrities on the plight of various endangered species, and coincided with the launch of the BBC Wildlife Fund, a charitable organisation which distributes money to conservation projects around the world. The television series culminated in a live fundraising telethon on BBC Two, hosted by Alan Titchmarsh, which raised over £1 million for the charity.

The BBC broadcast a second live telethon in 2010. Wild Night In was presented by Kate Humble, Chris Packham and Martin Hughes-Games and featured conservation projects which had benefited from the support of the BBC Wildlife Fund.

== Background ==
The format of Saving Planet Earth was something of a departure for the Unit, using celebrities not normally associated with natural history programmes rather than selecting a familiar face from its pool of specialists.

The season began with a special hour-long programme on BBC One entitled "Sharing Planet Earth", a clarion call for action to conserve nature, presented by David Attenborough. It was followed by nine documentaries broadcast nightly over the course of a fortnight, in which celebrities investigated the plight of endangered species. Each programme was introduced by Alan Titchmarsh and featured a short narration by Attenborough to provide some background information on the featured species.

Along with the BBC One programmes, a five-part series entitled Saving Planet Earth – UK was broadcast in parallel on BBC Two. Presented by Michaela Strachan, it aimed to show audiences the threats facing British wildlife, and how they could help by becoming directly involved in conservation.

A second five-part series on the CBBC Channel followed seven young competition winners on their own personal journeys to destinations including Brazil and Borneo to report on threatened species.

The season culminated with a live fundraising evening to raise money for a newly established conservation charity, the BBC Wildlife Fund.

=== 1. Sharing Planet Earth - presented by David Attenborough ===
"All the animals we'll see over the course of the series are disappearing because of one species: humans. We know that we are using more than our fair share of the planet and its resources and we must now redress this imbalance. Any effort to do so – no matter how big or small – is valuable, if we wish to ensure a future that is healthy for all life on planet Earth so we have to save earth from various types of Pollution, Waste food, Drained Water etc. The earth is our mother planet in which we born and understand learn to speak, learn to walk and learned everything that we are now able to do. "It is only planet in our solar system on which life exists which incredible biodiversity. People all over the world celebrate this grand event all to protect flora and fauna and clean up the earth on which we live. Our life will be wasted if we have no any goal. Without any goal we will feel unlucky, waste life etc. But if we don't Save Planet Earth then, our Earth will be destroyed and we can't live. So, Save Planet Earth.

=== 2. Saving Gorillas ===
In the first of nine 30-minute films focussing on particular threatened species, pop star Will Young travels to Cameroon to report on the plight of the lowland gorilla. Although more numerous than its mountain-dwelling cousins, its numbers are declining fast due to habitat loss and poaching.

=== 3. Saving Tigers ===
Tigers have been a protected species for many years, but despite this they are increasingly threatened by extinction due to poaching and increasing conflict with humans. But can the spiritual and deeply felt respect for tigers held by ordinary Indians offer a lifeline for the species? Newsreader Fiona Bruce reports from Bandhavgarh National Park, where acclaimed wildlife cameraman and tiger expert Alphonse Roy has been watching and filming them for 20 years.

=== 4. Saving Crocodiles ===
DJ Edith Bowman travels 6,000 miles to Cambodia on the trail of the very rare Siamese crocodile, which was hunted to brink of extinction. Now, conservation charities such as The Wildlife Conservation Society and Fauna and Flora International are working in partnership with the Cambodian government and have established a crocodile farm to increase the population size.

=== 5. Saving Albatross ===
Carol Thatcher flies to the Falkland Islands to find out why the black-browed albatross and its relatives are under threat. Albatross numbers have plummeted in recent years due to long-line fishing practices.

=== 6. Saving Rhinos ===
Former England cricketer Phil Tufnell reports from Assam in India, one of the last remaining homes of the Indian rhinoceros. Fewer than 2,000 are left in the wild due to poaching for their horns.

=== 7. Saving Wolves ===
In the southern part of the Ethiopian Highlands, a remote mountain region and the last home of the Ethiopian wolf, Graham Norton discovers that encroachments by the ever-expanding human population is threatening the wolf's survival.

=== 8. Saving Elephants ===
Adrenaline junkie Jack Osbourne journeys to northern Namibia to investigate the plight of the desert elephant. Although saved from extinction by the banning of the ivory trade, the desert elephants now face a new threat. Local people once roamed the land as migrants, but their recent conversion to farming has brought them into conflict with elephants over precious resources.

=== 9. Saving Turtles ===
Of the seven remaining species of sea turtle, six are seriously threatened with extinction. Saira Khan travels to Sri Lanka, one of the best places in the world to see turtles, but even here commercial fishing practices and pressure on the turtles' nesting beaches are driving numbers down.

=== 10. Saving Orangutans ===
TV presenter Nick Knowles reports from Borneo, where orangutan numbers are being decimated due to the deforestation of the island and the growth of palm plantations. He visits a sanctuary where more than 600 orphaned young apes are cared for. Their mothers are usually killed by plantation workers, because the orangutans are attracted to the palms for food and can damage the crops. Their young are taken for the pet trade or are simply left to die, but those lucky enough to be rescued are brought to the sanctuary. Now, it simply can't cope with the number of apes being brought in and desperately needs extra funds. This programme was incorporated into the live fundraising broadcast (see below).

=== 11. Saving Planet Earth – Live ===
The series culminated in a live fundraising event broadcast from Kew Gardens, hosted by Titchmarsh and featuring interviews with many of the BBC's natural history presenters, including Attenborough, Strachan, Bill Oddie, Kate Humble, Simon King, Steve Leonard, Jonathan Scott, Chris Packham and Charlotte Uhlenbroek. A registered charity, the BBC Wildlife Fund, was established to direct funds raised by the programmes to conservation charities in the field to help save the featured animals, and other species, from extinction. Saving Planet Earth enabled the Fund to raise £1 million on the night, a total which had almost doubled by the end of 2010.
