= Simon King (broadcaster) =

British television presenter and cameraman

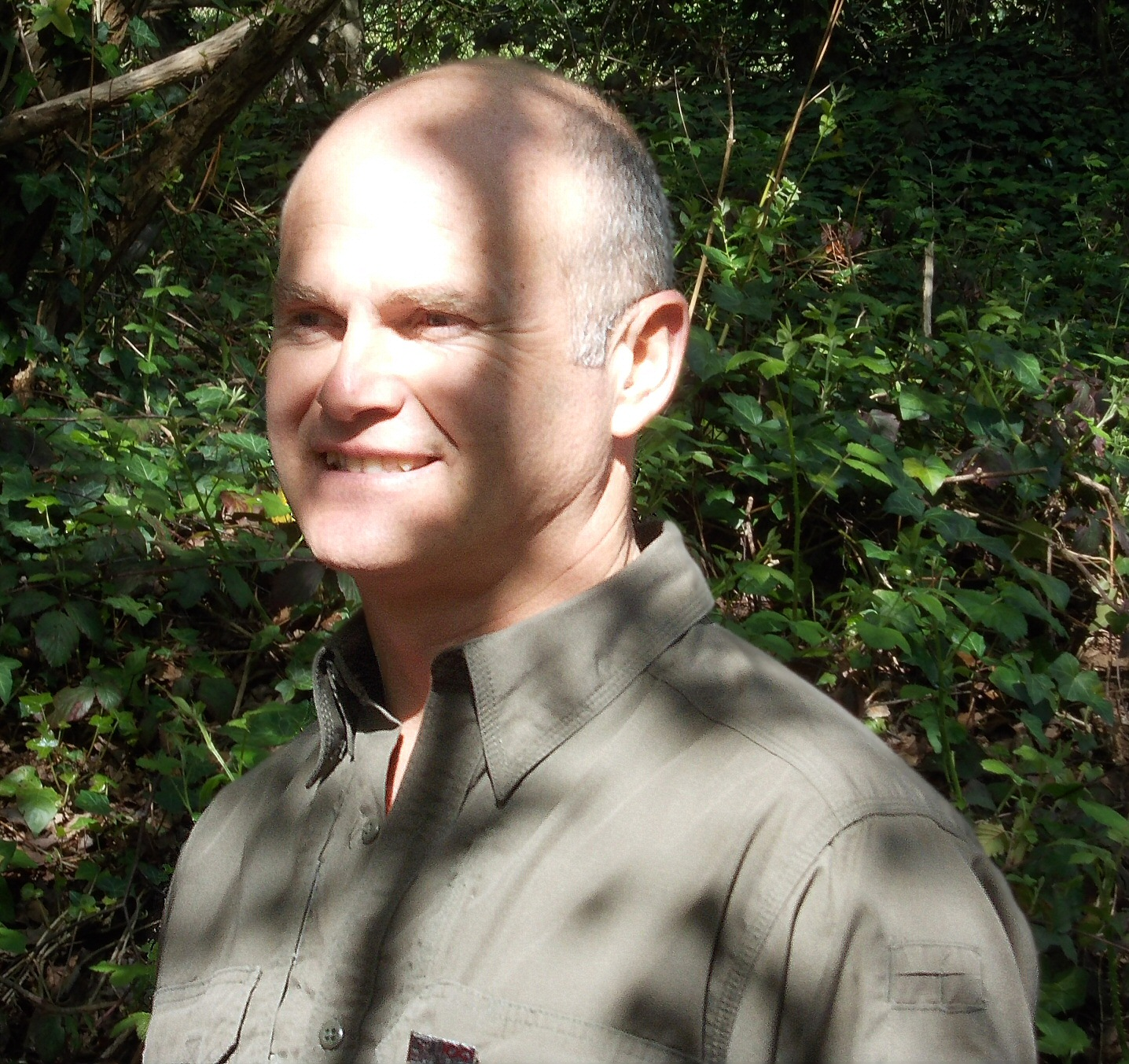
Simon King celebrating 100 years of The Wildlife Trusts at Gunnersbury Triangle local nature reserve, 2012

Simon Henry King OBE HonFRPS (born 27 December 1962) is a British naturalist, author, conservationist, television presenter and cameraman, specialising in nature documentaries. King received an Honorary Fellowship of the Royal Photographic Society in 2011.

King has been working in the field of natural history film making for over 30 years. He has credited his media career to his parents, his father being in the television industry and his mother being involved in the music industry.

== Early life ==
King was born in Nairobi, Kenya, to parents John King and Eve King (née Shulman), where King's father worked with the British Forces Broadcasting Service (BFBS) in Nairobi. The family moved to Bristol in the United Kingdom in 1964, when John got a job as a reporter for the BBC's Points West news programme.

== Education ==
King attended Henbury School in Bristol from 1974 to 1979.

== Earliest television work ==
He began his career as a child actor at the age of ten in such television films as The Fox (1973) and Secret Place (1974). In 1976 he accompanied naturalist Mike Kendall in the BBC series Man and Boy, in which they searched the country for Britain's wildlife. All of these were his father's projects.

In 1980/81 King presented, and shot the wildlife elements of, a 7 part series called County Camera which was made for Westward Television and was shot on location in the South West of England. It was directed by John King and made in association with Double Jay Films.

In 1984, he made his first film for television – "The Willow", a study of the wildlife which surrounds a willow tree. This was broadcast as an edition of the BBC series The World About Us, as was his following film "The Hidden Land", a study of the wildlife which exists around the hotels in Spain's Costa del Sol. He has since gone on to produce more than 80 natural history films as principal cameraman, director, producer and many more as presenter.

== Presenting and filming ==
King made two series of King's Country and a series of King's Country Diary for the BBC. He was also responsible for BBC Two's Christmas dramatised wildlife documentaries including "Rannoch the Red Deer", "Dusk the Badger", "Shadow the Peregrine" and the programmes "Aliya the Asian Elephant" and "Tyto the Barn Owl", which were produced and narrated by his father and won industry awards.

He presented the highly successful six-part series King and Company and A Walk on the Wildside which was two-and-a-half years in the making. Since 1992, King has worked on programmes for the BBC Natural History Unit. His early credits included presenting stints on series such as Nature Detectives and Wild Nights with Simon King, as well as fronting the Unit's occasional live "Watch" broadcasts. He was a regular presenter on BBC Two's Tracks, fronted Watch Out on the same channel and filmed all over the world for Hot Shots, a series which looked at the making of natural history films.

More recently, King has filmed and co-presented the long-running BBC One series Big Cat Diary alongside Jonathan Scott and Saba Douglas-Hamilton, which follows the progress of lions, leopards and cheetahs in the Masai Mara Game Reserve. He also co-presented BBC Two's annual Springwatch and Autumnwatch series with Bill Oddie and Kate Humble later with Chris Packham and Martin Hughes-Games. For these, King films and presents live outside broadcasts from wildlife hotspots around the British Isles, including Shetland, Mull, the London Wetlands Centre and the Somerset Levels.

Recent filming projects include principal camera credits for Wild Africa and The Blue Planet. He has won BAFTA awards for his camera work on Life in the Freezer and Planet Earth, for which he filmed a celebrated slow-motion sequence of a great white shark leaping out of the water to catch a Cape fur seal.

In 2007, it was announced that King and an assistant had been attacked by a rabid cheetah in Kenya while filming for Natural World. They were given rabies jabs and did not develop the disease, although the cheetah itself later died. This attack was documented in the Natural World episode "Toki's Tale."

In 2011, King was part of the camera team for the Disney film, African Cats.

King has filmed a number of instructional videos for Ordnance Survey, with help on using a compass, reading a map and using grid references.

King was awarded an Honorary Fellowship of the Royal Photographic Society in 2011. These are awarded to distinguished persons having, from their position or attainments, an intimate connection with the science or fine art of photography or the application thereof.

== Personal life ==
King has three children from his first marriage: Alexander (born 1986), Romy (born 1989) and Greer (born 1995) and one daughter from his second marriage, Savannah (born in August 2006), to his second wife Marguerite Smits van Oyen. In 2024 King married Kim Whittlestone.

King was appointed Officer of the Order of the British Empire (OBE) in the 2010 New Year Honours for services to wildlife photography and conservation, and was awarded the Royal Geographical Society's Cherry Kearton Medal and Award in 2009.

== Programmes ==
As presenter:
- The Fox (1973)
- A Secret Place (1974)
- Man and Boy (1976 & 1978)
- The World About Us episodes:

"The Willow" (1981)
"The Hidden Land" (1982)

- King's Country (1983)
- Three in the Wild episodes:

"Shak The Red Fox" (1984)
"Mordicus The Buzzard" (1984)
"Toran The Dartmor Pony" (1984)

- Rush The Fallow Deer (1985)
- Wildtrack (1985)
- Bird Brain Of Britain (1985)
- Herrag The Herring Gull (1986)
- Simon King's Country Diary (1986)
- Priddy The Hedgehog (1987)
- Brockside (1987)
- The Flying Gourmet's Guide (1987)
- King and Company (1988)
- Daylight Robbery (1988)
- Carna The Otter (1988)
- Nest Side Story (1989)
- Drift The Mute Swan (1989)
- Kali The Lion (1990)
- Dusk The Badger (1991)
- Aliya The Asian Elephant (1992)
- Walk on the Wildside (1992)
- Inura The Dingo (1993)
- Nature Detectives (1993)
- Tyto The Barn Owl (1994)
- Bird in the Nest (1994)
- BeachWatch (1994)
- Rannoch The Red Deer (1995)
- Watch Out (1995)
- Hot Shots (1995)
- FlamingoWatch (1995)
- Shadow The Peregrine (1996)
- Heading South (1996)
- Big Cat Diary (1996 onwards)
- Highland Diary (1999)
- Live from Dinosaur Island (2001)
- Natural World episodes:

"Meerkats, Part of the Team" (2002)
"Cheetahs, Fast Track to Freedom" (2004)
"Toki's Tale" (2007)
"Tiger Kill" (2008)

- Wild in Your Garden (2003)
- Britain Goes Wild with Bill Oddie (2004)
- Springwatch (2005 onwards)
- Autumnwatch (2006 onwards)
- Big Cat Live and Big Cat Raw (2008)
- My Life With Animals (2008)
- Watching The Wild – Fallow Deer (2008)
- Simon King's Shetland Diaries (2010)
Additional photography credits:
- The World About Us episode:

"The Royal Forest" (1979)

- Wildlife on One episode:

"The Bee Team" (1988)

- The Trials of Life (1990)
- Living Britain (1999)
- Andes to Amazon (2000)
- Wild Africa (2001)
- The Blue Planet (2001)
- The Life of Mammals (2002)
- Natural World episode:

"Shark Coast" (2005)

- Planet Earth (2006)
- Life (2009)
- African Cats (2011)

Non-profit organization positions
Preceded by Aubrey Manning	President of the Wildlife Trusts; 2010–present	Incumbent
