= Shark (British TV series) =

- Genre: Nature documentary
- Directed by: Steve Greenwood
- Narrated by: Paul McGann
- Country of origin: United Kingdom
- Original language: English
- No. of episodes: 3

Production
- Executive producer: Mike Gunton
- Producer: Steve Greenwood
- Production location: Worldwide
- Running time: 58 minutes
- Production companies: BBC Natural History Unit; Discovery Channel

Original release
- Network: BBC One
- Release: 7 May – 21 May 2015

Shark is a 2015 British BBC television documentary about the lives of sharks. It was created by the BBC Natural History Unit in co-operation with Discovery Channel UK.

== Episodes ==
No.	Title	Original release date
1	"Top Predator"	7 May 2015
2	"Social Life"	14 May 2015
3	"Beneath the Surface/Facing Extinction"	21 May 2015
