= Living Britain =

- Genre: Nature documentary
- Narrated by: Samuel West
- Country of origin: United Kingdom
- Original language: English
- No. of series: 1
- No. of episodes: 6

Production
- Producer: Peter Crawford
- Running time: 50 minutes
- Production company: BBC Studios Natural History Unit

Original release
- Network: BBC Two
- Release: 31 October – 5 December 1999

Living Britain is a six-part nature documentary series, made by the BBC Studios Natural History Unit, transmitted from 31 October to 5 December 1999. It was narrated by Samuel West and produced by Peter Crawford. It examines British wildlife over the course of one year. Each of the programmes takes place in a different time of year.

== Episodes ==
=== 1. "Deepest Winter" (31 October 1999) ===
Looks at Britain in the grip of winter featuring Eurasian otters, eagles, waders, swans, squirrels, red foxes, toads and deer.

=== 2. "Spring" (7 November 1999) ===
Follows the arrival of spring as it moves north featuring barn swallow, newt, eel, polecat, red kite and wildflowers.

=== 3. "Early Summer" (14 November 1999) ===
Follows the changing seasons with the arrival of early summer featuring may-flies, moles, northern gannets and phalaropes.

=== 4. "High Summer" (21 November 1999) ===
Midsummer is a busy time for insects, grouse & merlins rear their young & basking sharks visit our shores.

=== 5. "Autumn" (28 November 1999) ===
Autumn is a dramatic time of change – birds migrate, red deer rut, leaves change colour & fungi abound.

=== 6. "Winter Reflections" (5 December 1999) ===
Looks at the influence of people on Britain's wildlife in the past & looks ahead to the new millennium.
