= Attenborough and the Giant Egg =

- Presented by: David Attenborough
- Country of origin: United Kingdom

Original release
- Network: BBC
- Release: 2011

Attenborough and the Giant Egg is a 2011 British nature documentary written and presented by David Attenborough. The documentary is a follow-up of an episode in Madagascar, filmed in 1960, for Attenborough's earliest nature documentary series, Zoo Quest. In that episode, a native boy gave Attenborough a collection of large pieces of eggshell, which Attenborough temporarily pieced together with sticky tape to form a complete eggshell of the extinct elephant bird. The egg is the subject of the 2011 documentary, which is an hour long and premiered on 2 March 2011.

The documentary explores the history of the elephant bird, what led to its extinction, and the role of conservation in preventing the extinction of critically endangered species. The extinction of the elephant bird is attributed to human activity. The birds were once widespread, but deforestation and the hunting of the bird's eggs led to the species' decline. Attenborough compares the factors that led to the extinction of the elephant bird with the threats facing critically endangered species in the present.

== Reception ==
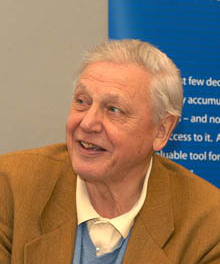
Attenborough and the Giant Egg was presented and written by David Attenborough

John Walsh of The Independent praised the film, especially Attenborough's role as a presenter, calling it a "bitty but fascinating documentary." Michael Deacon, a critic for The Daily Telegraph, wrote that the documentary demonstrated the "evolution of television presentation," and commended Attenborough for his "rare and unteachable ability to speak as if addressing you alone, rather than an audience of millions." Andrew Anthony of The Guardian was critical of the backstory of the documentary, writing that it exaggerated the mystery of the egg. However, Anthony lauded Attenborough, commenting that "Attenborough's enduring passion for the planet's innumerable lifeforms remains one of television's abiding achievements."
