= Ganges (TV series) =

Nature documentary series

- Series title card from UK broadcast
- Genre: Nature documentary
- Narrated by: Sudha Bhuchar
- Composer: Barnaby Taylor
- Country of origin: United Kingdom
- Original language: English
- No. of episodes: 3

Production
- Executive producer: Ian Gray
- Production locations: India; Bangladesh
- Running time: 150 minutes
- Production companies: BBC Natural History Unit; Travel Channel; France 3

Original release
- Network: BBC Two
- Release: 3 August – 17 August 2007

Ganges is a nature documentary television series focusing on the natural history of the River Ganges in India and Bangladesh. The series highlights the diverse array of animals and habitats found along the river's 2,510 km (1,557 mi) course, as well as the cultures, traditions, and religions of the large human population that relies on it. The Ganges is a sacred river and pilgrimage site for Hindus, deeply influencing their religion and culture, while also serving as a vital resource. The three-episode series follows the river from its source in the high Himalaya to its delta at the Bay of Bengal.

Ganges is narrated by actor/playwright Sudha Bhuchar and produced by the BBC Natural History Unit, in association with the Travel Channel and France 3. Ian Gray served as the series producer. It premiered on BBC Two in August 2007 as part of the BBC's "India and Pakistan '07" season, commemorating the 60th anniversary of independence from British rule and the partitioning.

The BBC previously employed this format for other documentary series about major world rivers, including Congo (2001) and Nile (2004).

== Episodes ==
=== 1. "Daughter of the Mountains" ===
The first episode explores the mythology surrounding the Ganges, illustrating how the natural and spiritual worlds have been intertwined in Hindu thought. It explains that the river's life-giving properties are the reason for its reverence.

The episode traces the Ganges back to its source, ascending into the Himalayan mountains and visiting pilgrimage centers along the way.

Starting at Kedarnath as the May thaw begins and hundreds of thousands of pilgrims commence their annual ascent, the episode travels through Yamunotri (the source of the Yamuna River), Badrinath (home to one of the holiest temples), and up Gangotri.

Geographically, this is not the actual source, so the episode continues past Gaumukh to the Tapovan meadows, identified here as the river's true source.

Throughout this journey, the episode showcases the region's diverse wildlife, featuring rare footage of snow leopards, the lammergeier (a large bird of prey with a 3-meter wingspan), and langur monkeys in the deodar trees.

The episode also visits Nandadevi, India's second-highest peak, and the Valley of Flowers at its foothills, which contains over 600 plant species, including the Himalayan balsam. It also highlights the valley's birdlife.

The episode concludes by showing the effects of monsoon hailstorms and rains, which contribute half of the river's water flow in just a few weeks and wash approximately 2 billion tons of sediment into the plains of India, creating fertile soil.

The episode follows the river from Devprayag, where the Alakananda and Bhagirathi rivers converge to form the Ganges, and through the cities of Rishikesh and Haridwar.

=== 2. "River of Life" ===
This episode follows the river as it leaves the Himalayan foothills and enters the Terai swamplands, where grasses can grow 4 meters per year.

Other creatures inhabit the Terai swamplands: Indian rhinoceros and Bengal tiger in the east; Birds such as the bar-headed goose, ruddy shelduck, spoonbill, and Indian skimmer along the Chambal river in central India. The episode also features the gharial, a critically endangered species of crocodile with a long, narrow snout that exclusively eats fish.

The monsoon season revitalizes the river, which dries up during the hot season, and carries sediment from the mountains, creating mud and soil deposits up to 3 miles deep in certain areas.

The fertile land supports rice cultivation, where domestic ducks help clean and fertilize the fields, and the sarus crane, the largest flying bird, performs its courtship dances.

The episode emphasizes the Hindu respect for all life, including dangerous animals like cobras, which are allowed to roam freely in some villages, and macaques, which can be violent when searching for food.

This is contrasted with the devastation caused by the Moghul's hunting practices and, to an even greater extent, by the British, who hunted and destroyed habitats for commerce.

The team visits the Sonepur Mela in Bihar, the largest livestock fair in India, where cattle, horses, and elephants are traded, and observes villagers fighting off wild elephants in Bengal.

The episode concludes by tracing the Hooghly through Kolkata, examining the effects of large-scale populations and pollution on the river and questioning whether the river and its inhabitants, like the Ganges river dolphin, can survive.

=== 3. "Waterland" ===
The final episode examines the river's impact as it reaches the Bay of Bengal and forms the world's largest delta system.

The delta spans India and Bangladesh and includes the world's largest mangrove swamp, the Sunderbans, which is home to giant Asian honey bees and man-eating tigers.

The episode follows a scientific team as they tranquilize and track a tigress to learn more about how tigers live and survive in the swamps.

The swamp also supports other creatures, from mudskippers to otters, which are bred by fishermen to help drive fish into their nets.

The delta has the highest density of human population on Earth. Six times more people than live in Britain find their living in the delta, thanks to the river's water and fertile mud, which allows for three rice crops per year.

The episode observes the changes in the land throughout the dry season, when water levels can drop significantly, and the rainy season, when water levels rise and cause animals and humans to migrate.

The documentary concludes by questioning whether the river can survive increasing populations that consume its water. It finds hope in the reverence the river has always commanded from the Hindu religion, as one million pilgrims gather at Sagar Island to give thanks to the river before it enters the sea.
