= Martha Holmes (broadcaster) =

British television producer and writer

Martha Holmes is a BAFTA Award-winning BBC Television producer and writer known for her wildlife documentaries.

== Biography ==
Holmes studied for a PhD in marine biology at the University of York.

She started work at the BBC in 1988 hosting a live underwater broadcast from the northern Red Sea for Reefwatch, and the award-winning wildlife adventures series Sea Trek (which she hosted with American born documentary filmmaker the late Mike deGruy).

She joined the production team for Life in the Freezer and produced BBC Wildlife Specials episode on the polar bear for which she won the Best Factual Photography award at the 1998 BAFTAs. She was awarded the Royal Geographical Society's Cherry Kearton Medal and Award in 1999.

=== The Good Fish Guide ===
Holmes joined a conservationist campaign to boycott 20 varieties of fish because of the impact of over-fishing on their numbers and the environment.

Many people are aware of the over-fishing problem, but would like to learn about the bigger picture and know how they can make a difference.

— Martha Holmes

She wrote the introduction to "The Good Fish Guide" which accompanied the campaign.

== Filmography ==
- Reefwatch (1988), presenter
- Sea Trek (1991), presenter
- Life in the Freezer (1993) production team
- BBC Wildlife Specials: Polar Bear (1997), producer
- The Blue Planet (2001), producer
- The Nile (2004), series producer
- The Man-Eating Lions of Njombe (2005), producer
- The Man-Eating Leopard of Rudraprayag (2005), producer
- The Man-Eating Wolves of Gysinge (2005), producer
- The Making of 'Deep Blue' (2006), segment producer
- Tiny World (2020-2021), executive producer

== Bibliography ==
- Holmes, Martha (17 October 1991). Sea Trek. BBC Books (hardcover). ISBN 978-0-563-36091-9.
- Byatt, Andrew; Alastair Fothergill & Martha Holmes (27 September 2001). The Blue Planet. BBC Books (hardcover). ISBN 978-0-563-38498-4.
- Holmes, Martha; Gavin Maxwell & Tim Scoones (19 February 2004). Nile. BBC Books (hardcover). ISBN 978-0-563-48713-5.
