= Barney Johnson =

Nurseryman and television gardener

Bernard "Barney" Stafford Johnson was a horticulturalist who became the first television gardener in Ireland, presenting The Garden on RTÉ from 1977 to 1979. He worked at the Marlfield Nursery in Dublin from 1953. His son is the nature film maker and presenter Colin Stafford-Johnson.
