= Lucy Cooke =

British zoologist and author

- Born: 1969/1970 (age 56–57); East Sussex, England
- Education: New College, Oxford (MS)
- Occupations: Zoologist, author, television producer and director
- Organization: Sloth Appreciation Society

Lucy Cooke (born 1969/1970) is a British zoologist, author, television producer, director, and presenter.

== Early life and education ==
Cooke was born and raised in East Sussex. She has an undergraduate masters in zoology from New College, Oxford, where she was tutored by Richard Dawkins.

== Career ==
Cooke began her career in television comedy production, and then moved into documentaries, later specialising in natural history. Among others, she is credited as director and producer for Balderdash and Piffle, director for Medieval Lives and You Don't Know You're Born, and presenter of Springwatch.

Cooke has presented a range of natural history programmes for the BBC. In 2015 she presented Nature's Boldest Thieves and Animals Unexpected. In 2016 she was a co-presenter on the four part series Ingenious Animals. She was a team captain on the BBC Quiz show Curious Creatures, which ran for two series from 2017 to 2018. In 2019, she presented the Animal Planet series Nature's Strangest Mysteries: Solved.

In 2020, she presented Inside the Bat Cave, which was broadcast on the BBC.

Cooke is the author of The Truth About Animals: Stoned Sloths, Lovelorn Hippos, and Other Tales from the Wild Side of Wildlife, which investigates popular misconceptions about animals, including sloths, hyenas, penguins, and pandas. She had previously written three books about sloths: A Little Book of Sloth, The Power of Sloth, and Life in the Sloth Lane: Slow Down and Smell the Hibiscus, and presented a TED Talk on the subject. She also founded the Sloth Appreciation Society.

Cooke is also the author of Bitch: A revolutionary guide to sex, evolution & the female animal, published in 2022, which is also published as Bitch: On the female of the species.

== Personal life ==
Cooke was diagnosed with breast cancer in 2015, after which she adopted a healthier lifestyle. She moved back to her hometown of Hastings, East Sussex in 2019.

== Bibliography ==
- A Little Book of Sloth (2013)
- The Power of Sloth (2014)
- The Truth About Animals: Stoned Sloths, Lovelorn Hippos, and Other Tales from the Wild Side of Wildlife (2017)
- Life in the Sloth Lane: Slow Down and Smell the Hibiscus (2018)
- Bitch: A revolutionary guide to sex, evolution and the female animal (2022; also published as Bitch: On the Female of the Species)
