= Jackson Looseyia =

Kenyan television presenter (born 1967)

- Born: 1 January 1967 (age 59)
- Occupation: Television presenter

Jackson Saigilu Ole Looseyia (born 1967 in Masai Mara in Kenya) is the son of a hunter gatherer and presenter on the BBC show Big Cat Live. He maintains a blog documenting his guide and documentary work. He contributed to the grasslands episode of the BBC production Human Planet, leading the crew to film Dorobo people stealing meat from lions.

== Sources ==
- "Jackson Looseyia", Big Cat Live, BBC.
