= Pacific Abyss =

British television series

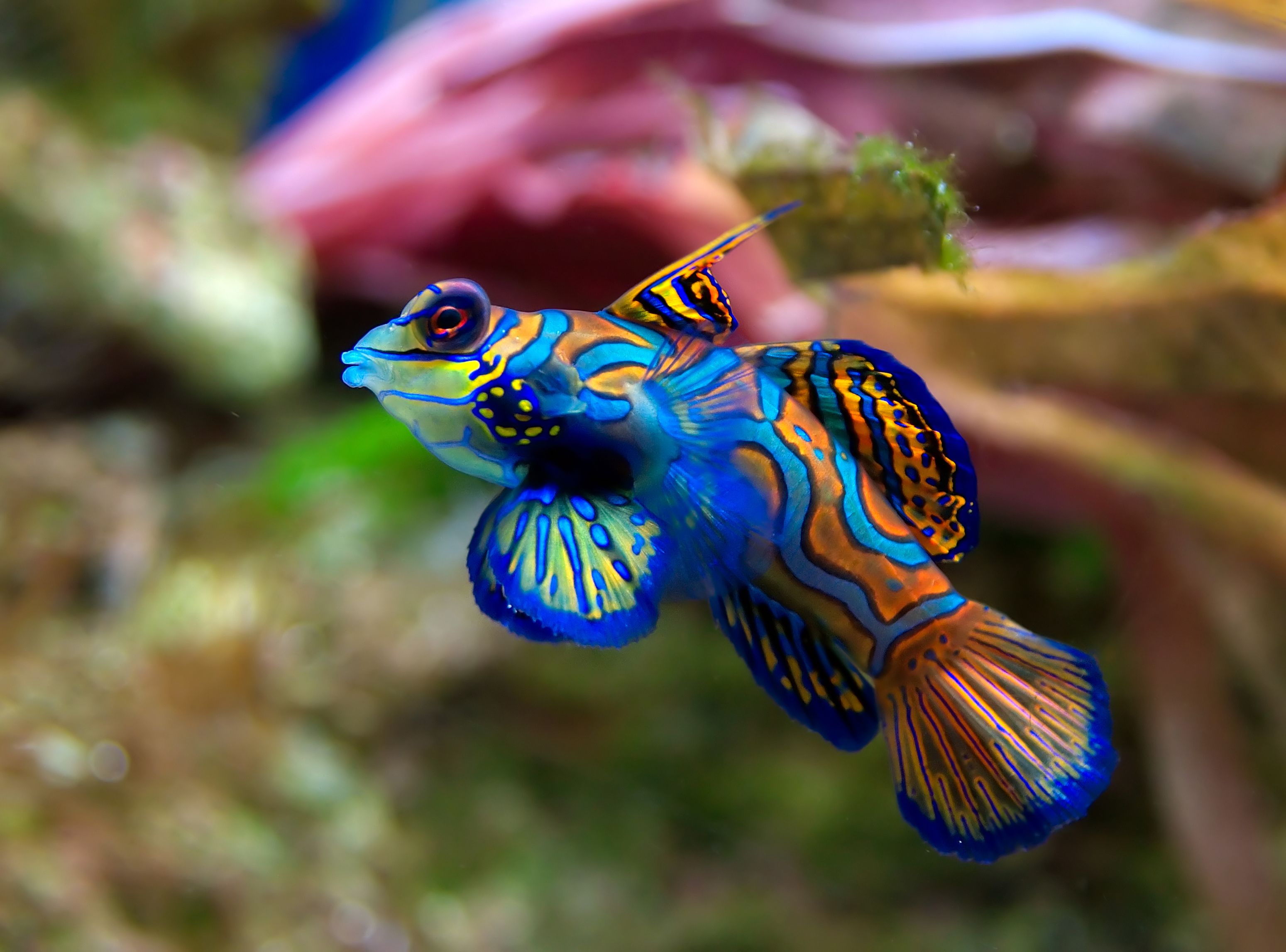
A mandarinfish (Synchiropus splendidus), like those seen on the expedition

Pacific Abyss is a three-part series on British television's (BBC1), which first aired in Sunday 17 August 2008. It is hosted by Kate Humble, Mike Smart and Mike deGruy with filming beginning in April/May 2007.

It is an underwater wildlife series which takes viewers into a 2,000 miles (3,200 km) adventure across the Pacific with a team of natural history filmmakers and deep water marine biologists. A 30-strong team took part in the expedition, to search for new species in the remote and unexplored areas. Micronesia has some of the deepest ocean trenches on the planet, with sheer walls often a few hundred metres from the islands' shores. These are the perfect locations for the search for new fish species. The teams explore World War II wrecks, steep drop offs and deep caverns.

Using the latest in scuba technology, the divers enter the least explored region of the ocean – the 'Twilight Zone', an area between 60 and 150 metres, including ROVs and a Newtsuit, allowing for extremely deep dives, as deep as 225 metres (738 ft), several new species were discovered.

As the expedition team near the end of their journey across Micronesia, it's a race against time for the extreme deep divers as they continue their search for new species, exploring different islands like the Rock Islands of Palau. The "Newtsuit" is a feat of submarine engineering – a bright yellow one-man submersible that Mike DeGruy has to master before he can venture even deeper into the Pacific abyss.

Team member Jo Ruxdon who described the whole series as "something new" in that people have never been able to dive to such depths in such remote places.

== Episode list ==
=== 1. The Ghosts of Chuuk Lagoon ===
The team tests all the high tech recording and diving equipment before they head out to the Pacific Islands in Chuuk Lagoon. They visit the site of one of the most dramatic raids of World War II, before heading out to the open water in their ship, the Big Blue Explorer, a home away from home.

=== 2. In Search of Giants ===
The team explores the reefs of Micronesia, visiting its reefs and islands. They look for many different kinds of fish, both known and unknown species. They find many different species, including the mandarin fish (pictured), a beautiful school of barracuda, and the very elusive manta rays.

=== 3. Into The Abyss ===
As the Big Blue Explorer heads to their final destination at Palau Islands, they test out the very futuristic "Newtsuit", that could take divers to new depths, into the abyss.
