= Peter Crawford (filmmaker) =

Peter Crawford is a British award-winning, freelance film-maker, author and lecturer.

Peter Crawford is perhaps best known for his natural history documentary films and TV series in the United Kingdom and United States including, in 1990, the first television series to attempt to comprehensively document North America's wildlife, Land of the Eagle (WNET New York) and in 1999; Living Britain (BBC 2), a series of ten 30 minute films which portrayed the natural history of Great Britain and Ireland. Living Britain was accompanied by a book written by Peter Crawford which became a Number 1 Best Seller for BBC Books.

== Career ==
Although Peter Crawford is now freelance and specialises in lecturing and writing on Polynesia and the people and wildlife of the Pacific Ocean, he spent most of his career working in the world-renowned BBC Natural History Unit. Whilst there he was instrumental in bringing, via the television screen, a new-found interest in environmentalism and the relationship of people and the natural world to the living rooms of the United Kingdom.

He pioneered new ways of bringing natural history and environmental issues to wide audiences. 'World Safari' and 'Global Sunrise' highlighted his ambitious style of presentation.

Peter Crawford studied Zoology and Marine Biology at the University of Exeter in England and made further studies in anthropology at the University of Mainz in Germany. In 2008, he was appointed Honorary Visiting professor at Exeter University.

== Selected film and television works ==
=== Natural history ===
- The Living Isles (1986)
- Land of the Eagle (1990 BBC/WNET New York)
- Global Sunrise: Around the world in 80 minutes (1997, BBC 2)
- Living Britain (1999, BBC 2)
- Great Natural Wonders of the World (2002, BBC 2)
- Moonpower (2003, BBC 2)

=== Dramatised history ===
- Nomads of the Wind (1994, BBC 2)
- The Forgotten Voyage (BBC 2)
- The Garden of Inheritance (BBC 2)

== Written works ==
- In The Country (edited and compiled by Peter Crawford) (1980) ISBN 0-333-29325-8
- The Curious Cat (with Michael Allaby) (1982) ISBN 0-7181-2065-5
- The Living Isles (1985) ISBN 0-563-20369-2 (BBC Books) (winner of the 2001 BP Natural World book prize)
- Nomads of the Wind: A Natural History of Polynesia (1993) ISBN 0-563-36707-5 (BBC Books)
- Living Britain (1999) ISBN 0-563-38476-X (BBC Books)

== See also ==
- BBC Natural History Unit
- NHU Filmography
- Vaipo Waterfall
