= Frank E. Kleinschmidt =

American war photographer and documentary film maker

Frank Emil Kleinschmidt
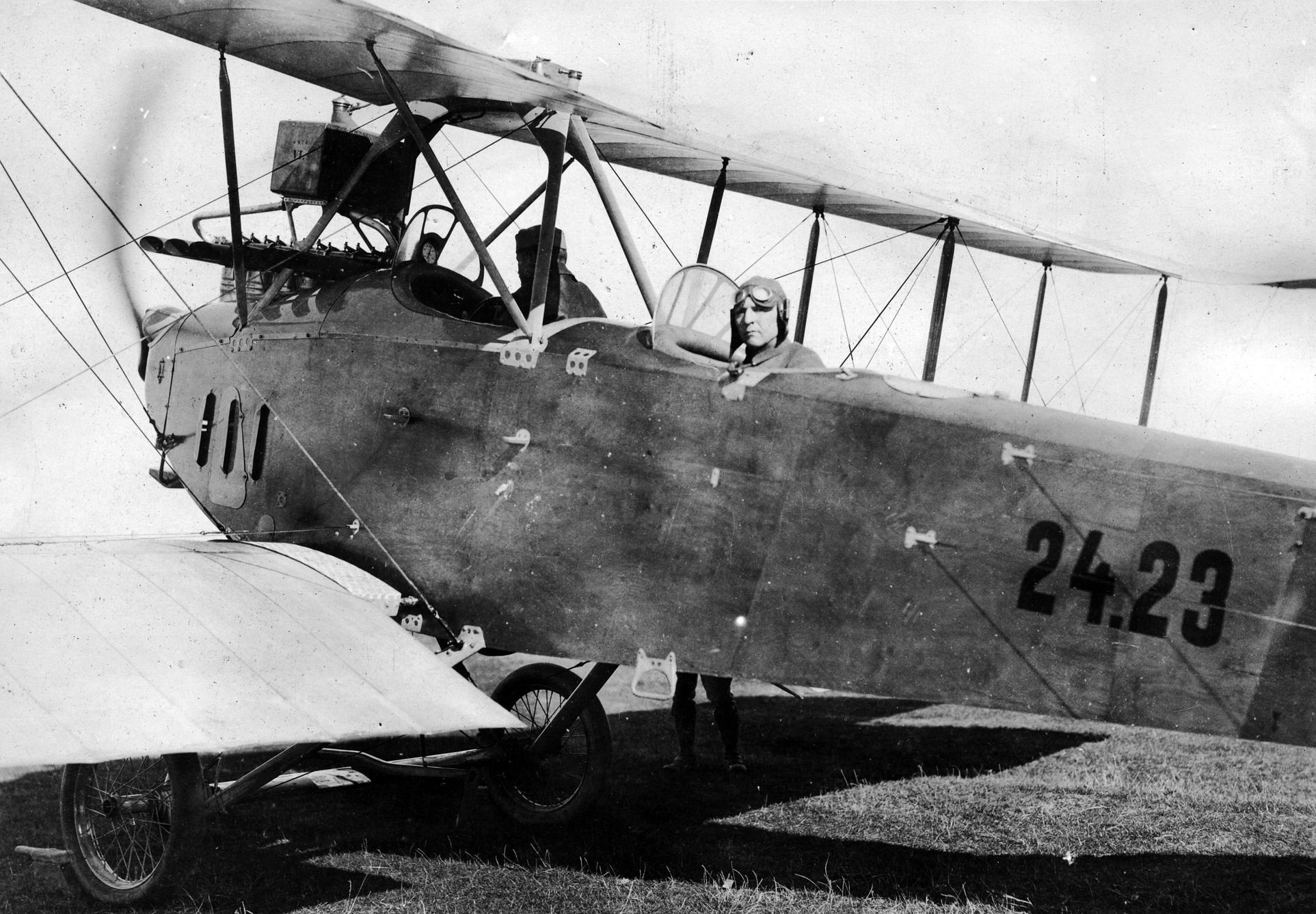
- Kleinschmidt on the Eastern Front, 1915
- Born: September 28, 1871 [Alt Rudnitz, Germany]
- Died: March 25, 1949 (aged 77); Los Angeles, California, US
- Occupations: documentary photographer and film producer
- Spouse(s): Margaret A. Young (married 1904-1916); Teresa E. Filion (married circa 1920-1949)
- Children: 3

Frank Emil Kleinschmidt (1871–1949) was a photographer and documentary cinematographer who explored the Arctic and filmed with the Austro-Hungarian army during World War I.

== Biography ==
Frank Emil Kleinschmidt was born in Alt Rüdnitz, Germany, on September 28, 1871. In 1893, he emigrated to the United States while working his way around the globe as a sailor on tramp steamers. Kleinschmidt went to Alaska in 1897 as an explorer during the Klondike Gold Rush, and raised his family there. He had his first experience with making motion pictures around 1909 while shooting film of a walrus hunt. His debut in the film business came when he released a motion picture record of the 1911 Carnegie Pittsburgh Museum expedition to Alaska and Siberia.

Kleinschmidt was attached to the Austro-Hungarian army in 1915 as an official photographer and cinematographer. His film War on Three Fronts (USA, 1916) has scenes showing military operations in the Balkans, on the Eastern front and near the Adriatic coast at Trieste. Kleinschmidt covered the Gorlice-Tarnow Offensive from the frontline trenches in May 1915, shot film from a plane of the bombardment of Belgrade and recorded naval operations on an Austrian submarine in the Mediterranean.

After the war Kleinschmidt worked on several film projects, mostly related to the Arctic North. In May 1922, he and his wife sailed from Seattle, Washington, and produced Adventures in the Far North. He was probably most successful commercially with a short film released in 1925, picturing Santa Claus in his workshop while he visits his Eskimo neighbors and tends his reindeer. Kleinschmidt toured across the United States with this film around Christmas time.

Frank Kleinschmidt moved to Hollywood, California, around 1932. He died in Los Angeles on March 25, 1949. He was buried at Forest Lawn Memorial Park in Glendale, California.

== Film analysis “War on Three Fronts” ==
Pictures featuring Capt. Frank Kleinschmidt and his film War on Three Fronts (USA 1916)

Footage from Kleinschmidt's film War on Three Fronts, as well as the original movie lecture, has been found by film historians Cooper C. Graham and Ron van Dopperen, while researching their book American Cinematographers in the Great War.

After touring with this film Kleinschmidt sold the distribution rights to Selznick Pictures in March 1917. Two reels of his World War I film were donated in the 1980s to the UCLA Film Archives by film preservationist David Shepard. The opening title refers to the original Part 4 of War on Three Fronts. A comparison by Graham and Van Dopperen between this footage and the film lecture revealed there were different movie versions. While on the lecture circuit in 1916–1917, Kleinschmidt presented about 9,000 feet of film. When the Selznick Corporation distributed the movie nationwide it was shortened and 3,000 feet were cut out. The UCLA print has no intertitles mentioning the Selznick Corporation, so this indicates this is a pre-1917 version of War on Three Fronts although not identical to the one that was used by Kleinschmidt to accompany the lecture.

War on the Eastern Front/ pictures by Frank Kleinschmidt, 1915

In 1918, film director D.W. Griffith used scenes from Kleinschmidt's film for his World War I propaganda production Hearts of the World. These scenes were taken at the Eastern Front with the Austro-Hungarian army but were presented by Griffith as shots of the German army invading peaceful France.

Research by the authors at the Library of Congress has produced additional footage from Kleinschmidt's World War I film. This consists of a batch of film segments that runs for about 35 minutes, including a sound track. The nitrate stock found in the film archives in Culpeper, Virginia, was dated 1932. The footage comes from a film called War Debts, which was produced by Kleinschmidt as a sound re-release of his original war film. The movie is narrated by Wilfred Lucas, a Canadian-born American stage actor who found success in film as an actor, director, and screenwriter. Kleinschmidt used this revamped film to advocate the collection of war debts and stop the armaments race in Europe during the 1930s.

== Sources ==
- James W. Castellan, Ron van Dopperen, Cooper C. Graham, American Cinematographers in the Great War, 1914-1918 (New Barnet, 2014) https://www.jstor.org/stable/j.ctt1bmzn8c
- Book review "American Cinematographers in the Great War, 1914-1914" Historical Journal of Film, Radio & Television (2016)
- Weblog on the American Films and Cinematographers of World War I, 2013-2018
- Kevin Brownlow, The War, the West and the Wilderness (London/New York 1979)
- "War on Three Fronts" (1916) - stills from Kleinschmidt's war film and various publicity pictures
- Film Lecture War on Three Fronts by Frank E. Kleinschmidt (USA, 1916) PDF
- Frank E. Kleinschmidt, "Making Movies In A Mine-Field", St. Louis Dispatch (29 July 1917) PDF
- * "War Debts" (USA, 1933) - sound re-release of Kleinschmidt's film "War on Three Fronts", discovered in 2014
- Movie Trailer "American Cinematographers in the Great War, 1914-1918"
