= Big Cat Diary =

Television series

- Also known as: Big Cat Week (2003–2006); Big Cat Live (2008)
- Genre: Nature documentary
- Presented by: Jonathan Scott (1996–2008); Simon King (1996–2008); Saba Douglas-Hamilton (2002–2006); Jackson Looseyia (2008); Kate Silverton (2008)
- Composer: David Poore
- Country of origin: United Kingdom
- Original language: English
- No. of episodes: 76 (including specials)

Production
- Producers: Keith Scholey; Robin Hellier
- Production location: Kenya
- Running time: 30 minutes
- Production company: BBC Natural History Unit

Original release
- Network: BBC One
- Release: 11 September 1996 – 24 December 2008

Related
- Orangutan Diary

Big Cat Diary, also known as Big Cat Week or Big Cat Live, is a long-running nature documentary series on BBC television which followed the lives of African big cats in Kenya's Maasai Mara. The first series, broadcast on BBC One in 1996, was developed and jointly produced by Keith Scholey, who would go on to become Head of the BBC's Natural History Unit. Eight series have followed, most recently Big Cat Live, a live broadcast from the Mara in 2008.

The original presenters, Jonathan Scott and Simon King, were joined by Saba Douglas-Hamilton from 2002 onwards. Kate Silverton and Jackson Looseyia were added to the presenting team for Big Cat Live.

== Merchandise ==
Currently available on Region 2 DVD are the 2004, 2005 and 2006 series of Big Cat Week (packaged as series 1 to 3, with series 1 and 2 being packaged together), the 2007 series of Big Cat Diary (packaged as series 4 of Big Cat Week) and highlights from Big Cat Live (packaged as Big Cat Special). There is also a trilogy of books written by Jonathan and Angela Scott, with each focusing on the stories concerning the lions, cheetahs and leopards of the Big Cat Diary format of the show.

In 2012, Seasons 1 and 2 of the original Big Cat Diary show was made available to download on iTunes and Amazon's Instant Video services. These episodes are DVD quality or better; however, no DVD or any other physical media are available for these two seasons. Additionally, Seasons 3 and 4 of the original Big Cat Diary series are not available at all as of August 2012.

The name and format of the show has changed several times. The following table illustrates the TV air dates and DVD release dates (if applicable) of each of the seasons.

| Overall Season | Season Name | Season Year – TV air | Season Year – DVD Release | Availability | Notes |
|---|---|---|---|---|---|
| 1 | Big Cat Diary – Season 1 | 1996–1997 | n/a | iTunes, Hulu, | |
| 2 | Big Cat Diary – Season 2 | 1998 | n/a | iTunes, Hulu | |
| 3 | Big Cat Diary – Season 3 | 2000–2001 | n/a | Hulu | |
| 4 | Big Cat Diary – Season 4 | 2002 | n/a | None as of February 2015 | |
| 5 | Big Cat Week – Season 1 | 2003 | 2006 | DVD | Released in same DVD package |
| 6 | Big Cat Week – Season 2 | 2004 | 2006 | DVD | Released in same DVD package |
| 7 | Big Cat Week – Season 3 | 2006 | 2007 | DVD | |
| 8 | Big Cat Week – Season 4 | 2006 | 2008 | DVD | |
| 9 | Big Cat Live – Season 1 | 2008 (late) | 2009 | DVD | Released as Big Cat Special |
