= Colin Stafford-Johnson =

Irish wildlife cameraman

- Born: Cabinteely, Dublin, Ireland
- Education: University of Derby
- Occupations: Cameraman; filmmaker; television presenter

Colin Stafford-Johnson is an Irish wildlife cameraman, filmmaker and television presenter, best known for his work on a variety of BBC nature documentaries.

== Early life and education ==
Stafford-Johnson was born and brought up in Cabinteely, Dublin, Ireland. His father Barney Johnson owned a garden centre and nursery, and was the first gardener to appear on Irish television. Stafford-Johnson moved to England in his twenties and subsequently spent time travelling. He attended the University of Derby, completing a degree in Biology, along with training to be a wildlife cameraman.

== Career ==
Stafford-Johnson has worked on filming several productions for RTÉ and the BBC, winning several awards for his work. He specialised in filming big cats and worked as a cameraman on the landmark BBC series Planet Earth.

He has filmed and presented several episodes of BBC's long running Natural World series. In 2011 he presented the episode "A Tiger Called Broken Tail", and the following year he presented "Queen of the Tigers." 2013 saw him present "Meet the Monkeys." In 2015 he narrated "Ireland’s Wild River: The Mighty Shannon" about the River Shannon.

In 2020 he presented a two-part wildlife programme titled "Wild Cuba: A Caribbean Journey".

Along with his work on Natural World, Stafford-Johnson has co-presented Wild UK and presented "Wild Ireland: Edge of the World" in 2017. In 2019 he presented "Animal Babies: First year on Earth".

In 2021, he returned to his home in Ireland to create a wild garden, a series filmed for the BBC as The Wild Gardener.
