= Jonathan Scott (zoologist) =

English zoologist, photographer and television presenter

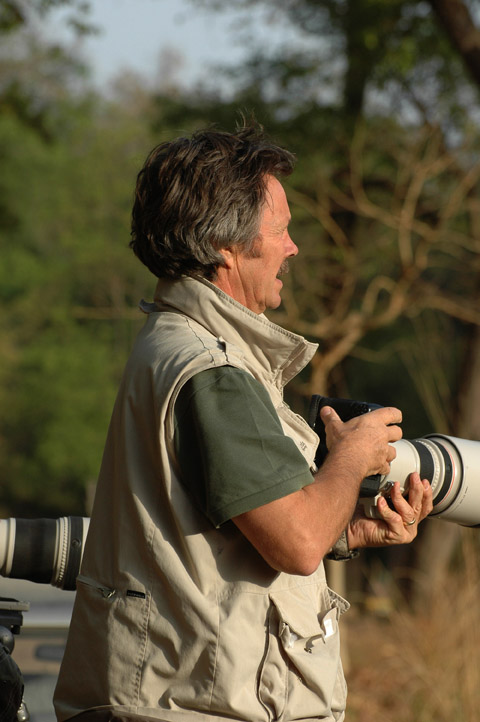
Jonathan Scott, wildlife photographer, in Bandhavgarh National Park, April 2009

Jonathan Scott (born 1949 in London) is an English zoologist, wildlife photographer and television presenter specializing in African wildlife.

== Life ==
Jonathan Scott was brought up on a farm in Berkshire, England and educated at Christ's Hospital School and Queen's University, Belfast. Jonathan and his wife Angela, who is also an award winning wildlife photographer, have a permanent base at Governor's Camp in the Maasai Mara National Game Reserve in southwest Kenya. They live in the suburb of Langata close to Nairobi National Park. Much of their work focuses on big cats, though they also enjoy spending time with the Maasai people and their families who live in the area surrounding the Maasai Mara.

== Living in Kenya ==
Jonathan travelled from London to Johannesburg in 1974 and has lived in Africa ever since. Jonathan was resident naturalist at Mara River Camp from 1977 to 1981 and then at Kichwa Tembo Camp from 1981 to 1992. He co-authored The Marsh Lions (1977) with journalist Brian Jackman and followed this with The Leopard's Tale (1985), which he authored alone. He sold limited editions of his pen and ink wildlife drawings to support himself in those early days. He married Angela Bellamy on 26 March 1992 in a ceremony conducted on the top of the 300-meter Siria Escarpment overlooking Marsh Lion territory in the Maasai Mara.

== Books ==
Jonathan and Angela have written and illustrated 35 books including 8 titles in Collin's award winning children's education series Big Cat. Jonathan was a presenter on Mutual of Omaha's Wild Kingdom from 1982 to 1984. He co-presented Africa Watch with Julian Pettifer in 1989 and Flamingo Watch with Simon King and Chris Packham in 1995 before going on to present his own series for the BBC Dawn to Dusk. Jonathan is probably best known as co-presenter of the popular wildlife soap opera Big Cat Diary which aired from 1996 to 2008, becoming known as Big Cat Week from 2003 to 2006 and then finally concluding with Big Cat Live in 2008. Angela was one of the big cat game spotters as well as the stills photographer for the series. Jonathan and Angela wrote and illustrated three books to accompany the series: Big Cat Diary: Lion, Leopard and Cheetah. The success of the Diary format saw Jonathan go on to co-present two series of Elephant Diaries (2005–2006), Big Bear Diary as well as narrating Chimpanzee Diaries. He presented a two-part series for BBC2 called The Truth About Lions which aired in 2011. Jonathan and Angela filmed two programmes entitled Sacred Nature in Season 2 of Tales by Light produced by Abraham Joffe of Untitled Film Works filmed in 2016 in the Maasai Mara in Kenya and the Serengeti in Tanzania. The show was funded by National Geographic/Canon Australia. The programmes showcase Jonathan and Angela's work as Conservation Photographers.

== Wild things ==
Jonathan and Angela traveled the world in the late 1990s presenting segments for Wild Things (Paramount Productions). They continue to host small groups and conduct photo workshops from places as far afield as Africa to Antarctica. They were guest lecturers for many years on the MS Explorer (an Antarctic expedition cruise ship popularly known as the Little Red Ship) and then on various ships owned by Quark Expeditions, and are the only couple to have both won the prestigious Overall Award in the Wildlife Photographer of the Year Competition - Jonathan in 1987 and Angela in 2002. Jonathan received the Cherry Kearton Medal from the Royal Geographical Society in 1994; in 1996 he was awarded an African Travel and Tourism Association Award; and in 2008 he was named Graduate of the Year by Queen's University, Belfast. Jonathan and Angela were named the Cheetah Conservation Fund's 2014 Cheetah Conservationists of the year.

Jonathan and Angela are Canon Ambassadors, members of the SanDisk Extreme Team and Patrons of the Cheetah Conservation Fund (UK) and Colobus Conservation, and were Ambassadors for Galapagos Conservation Trust until 2019. They are Ambassadors for the Kenya Wildlife Trust's Mara Predator Conservation Programme

As stated above, Jonathan was a co-host of Big Cat Diary. Along with other naturalists, Jonathan tracked down and documented the lives of several big cats. His co-host Simon King documented the lives of the Marsh Pride lions and the life of a solo female lioness, Bibi, who had cubs but was shunned from the Marsh Pride. During all this Scott documented the cheetah Kike with her three nine-month-old cubs while Saba Douglas-Hamilton documented the lives of leopard Bella and her two cubs (Chui and unnamed female).

Jonathan and Angela continue to document the lives of the Marsh Pride of lions that Jonathan first began following in 1977. They also wrote up the story of Half-Tail the leopard from 1988 to the time of her death in 1999. They continued to follow her daughter Zawadi (a.k.a. Shadow) from 1996 until she disappeared at the age of 16 in 2012. They now follow Zawadi's four-year-old daughter who can sometimes be seen around Leopard Gorge in the North Mara Conservancy. Bradt Publishers published new updated editions of The Marsh Lions in 2012 and The Leopard's Tale in 2013 bringing readers up to date with Half-Tail and Zawadi's story.

In December 2015 the world heard of the poisoning of eight members of the Marsh Pride of lions. Three of the pride died - Bibi (17 years old), Sienna (11 years old) and a young male named Alan. Jonathan and Angela wrote extensively about this incident in the local and international press and on their Blog.

Jonathan and Angela wrote and illustrated the August 2020 cover story for BBC Wildlife Magazine called "Scarface: The Real Lion King", documenting the trials and tribulations of the Maasai Mara National Reserve and its iconic lions. Scarface is part of a group of male lions known as the 4 Musketeers who took over the Marsh Pride in 2011 and then deserted the area for Paradise Plains. The Musketeers are relatives and approximately 13 years of age. Scarface had a badly withered back leg and was unlikely to survive much longer after a long and successful reign. (Note: Scarface died old age and starvation on 11 June 2021.)

Jonathan and Angela published four children's books with Cambridge University Press beginning in January 2016: Scarface: The Real Lion King, The Great Migration, "Tigers of Ranthambore", and "Honey and Toto: The Story of a Cheetah Family".

Jonathan's The Big Cat Man: An Autobiography (Bradt) was published in August 2016 alongside a large format book of Jonathan and Angela's award-winning photography called Sacred Nature: Life's Eternal Dance (HPH) designed by their son David and based around their love affair with the Mara-Serengeti. This won them the Gold Award for Photography in the Independent Book Publishers Awards in 2017. They were the keynote speakers at Wild Shots in South Africa in October 2016, and at the Royal Geographical Society in London in November 2016 and again in October 2019.

In 2016, Jonathan and Angela appeared in the Australian television series Tales by Light.

Jonathan and Angela's latest TV series Big Cat Tales first aired on Animal Planet in October 2018 in the US and on Sky in the UK in March 2019. The five-part series focuses on the Maasai Mara's iconic big cats and is co-hosted with Jackson ole Looseyia.

== Sources ==
- BBC biography
