= Nature documentary =

Documentary genre

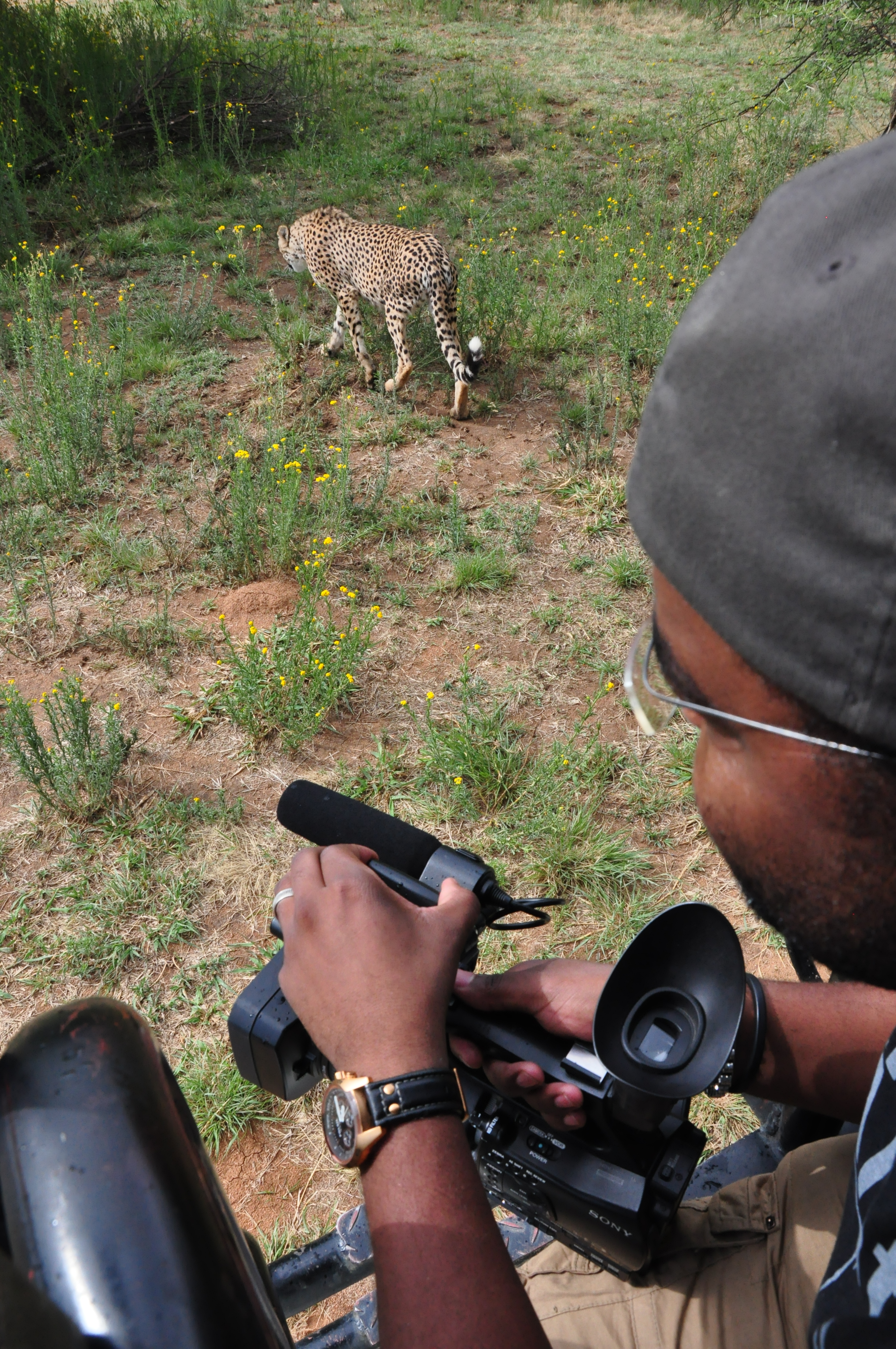
Filming a cheetah for a wildlife film in Namibia

A nature documentary or wildlife documentary is a documentary film or series about animals, plants, or other non-human living creatures. Nature documentaries usually concentrate on video taken in the subject's natural habitat, but often including footage of trained and captive animals, too. Sometimes they are about wildlife or ecosystems in relationship to human beings. Such programmes are most frequently made for television, particularly for public broadcasting channels, but some are also made for the cinema. The proliferation of this genre occurred almost simultaneously alongside the production of similar television series which is distributed across the world.

Nature documentaries are sometimes equated with wildlife films, due to their emphasis on narrative and cinematic techniques such as continuity editing. Not all narrative films about wildlife are marketed as documentaries.

== Cinema history ==
=== 19th century experiments ===
Animated frames of a jockey and racehorse, photographed by Eadweard Muybridge in 1887

From the 1870s to 1880s, Eadweard Muybridge produced the first short motion pictures intended to capture animal behavior, by recording moving animals in side profile. These locomotion studies were initially intended for narrow scientific use, "Descriptive Zoopraxography", as he referred to it.

Rough Sea at Dover (1896), by Robert Paul and Birt Acres, was a popular early silent film solely focused on the grandeur of nature itself, though it did not feature animals. The Sea Lions’ Home (1897), produced by Edison Studios, recorded wild animals in their natural habitat. Most filmed animals of the late 19th century were domesticated or zoo animals, recorded (albeit staged) as actuality films without any assigned story beyond animals moving or being fed.

=== 1900s–1930s ===
In Birdland (1907) by Oliver G. Pike used painstaking camerawork to capture footage of birds in their natural habitats. It is widely credited as the first wildlife film to receive a paid public screening, at the Palace Theatre in London. Yet its generally calm themes were an exception to a growing trend of staged violence in animal footage.

The most popular wildlife film narratives of the early 20th century involved violent, staged confrontations between captive animals in enclosed spaces or pits. Muybridge arranged for a captive tiger to kill a captive buffalo in 1884, but it took several more decades for staged violence to become more popular than peaceful zoo footage. This abusive genre was used most extensively by Frank Buck and Stacy Woodard in the 1930s. Buck inserted himself into the action (at one point wrestling a drowned tiger), while Woodard's pseudoscientific approach established the trope of "survival of the fittest", a misinterpretation of Darwinian theory to serve the claim that the animal world is a constant violent battle for supremacy. To some degree, nearly all major wildlife filmmakers of the early 20th century borrowed elements of staged combat. The Cinematograph Films (Animals) Act 1937 ended the production of staged animal combat films in the UK, and by the early 1940s they had fallen out of favor with general audiences in the United States as well.

Recorded hunting expeditions, starting with Hunting the White Bear (by Pathé, 1903), were another example of early narrative form in wildlife film. The Arctic, Africa, and India became preferred subjects for film-equipped hunters and naturalists such as Frank E. Kleinschmidt, Carl Akeley, Richard and Cherry Kearton, and Paul J. Rainey. Rainey's Africa Hunt (1912) was particularly popular for the breadth of its violent slaughter of lions, though prearranged slaughter was hardly unusual at the time. Cherry Kearton's Roosevelt in Africa (1910) filmed living animals in a style more typical of the developing documentary genre, while Theodore Roosevelt's exploits were more carefully curated throughout the narrative. Inspired by Rainey's films, Martin and Osa Johnson repopularized safari films in the 1920s, but few critics at the time acknowledged the manufactured format of their adventures. Martin Johnson died in a 1937 plane crash, and Osa continued to publish and star in more "adventures" up until her death in 1953.

More scientific animal documentaries were popularized in the 1910s by Raymond L. Ditmars, the Bronx Zoo curator of reptiles, as a way to more broadly disseminate his research. British Instructional Films introduced serialized natural history educational films through the Secrets of Nature series (1922–1933) by Percy Smith, Mary Field, and Bruce Woolfe. Despite their more educational leanings, Raymond Ditmar, Cherry Kearton, and the Secrets of Nature crew would frequently use humorous combinations of music, editing, and footage in their products. A few films of the early 20th century focused more on spectacular cinematography akin to modern nature documentaries, such as Alexander Korda's The Private Life of the Gannets (1934), which was the first wildlife short film to win an Academy Award.

=== 1940s–1950s ===
While most of the previous generation was retiring or dying, new innovative wildlife filmmakers came onto the scene in the 1940s, such as Hans Hass (best known for his underwater films) and Arne Sucksdorff (best known for his poetic cinematography).

Walt Disney Productions pioneered the serial theatrical release of spectacle-oriented nature documentaries with its production of the True-Life Adventures series, a collection of fourteen nature films (seven shorts and seven full-length features) from 1948 to 1960. These films were technically advanced and visually impressive, achieving both critical and commercial success at the time of their release. They carried over narrative tropes and cultural shorthands (such as young orphans, grand quests, and "family values") from the company's animated films such as Bambi (1942), as well as many animators and other personnel new to live-action filmmaking. Disney was far from the first company to project these themes onto animals, as seen in earlier literature and films such as Rango (1931) and Sequoia (1934), though it did help to bring them into connection with impressive visual splendor. Many hallmarks of later "blue-chip" documentaries, such as a supposedly pristine wilderness without human presence, have their basis in the True-Life Adventures. After a series of shorts, the series expanded into feature films with The Living Desert (1953) and The Vanishing Prairie (1954), both written and directed by James Algar. Despite their slicker appearance than older films, staged conflicts were still common occurrences in the True-Life Adventures, such as the infamous lemming herding scene from White Wilderness (1958).

The first full-length nature-documentary films pioneering colour underwater cinematography were the Italian film Sesto Continente (The Sixth Continent) and the French film Le Monde du silence (The Silent World). Directed by Folco Quilici, Sesto Continente was shot in 1952 and first exhibited to Italian audiences in 1954. The Silent World, shot in 1954 and 1955 by Jacques Cousteau and Louis Malle, was first released in 1956. In 1959, Bernhard Grzimek created Serengeti darf nicht sterben (Serengeti Shall Not Die), one of the earliest nature documentaries with an environmental message.

=== Legacy ===
Wildlife films, both small-scale and massive productions, continue to be created after the popularization of television, though broad theatrical releases are uncommon. The International Wildlife Film Festival was founded in Missoula, Montana in 1978. Other nature-focused film festivals followed suit, including the Wildscreen Film Festival (1982–) in Bristol, England, and the Jackson Hole Wildlife Film Festival (1991–) in Jackson Hole, Wyoming.

Nature documentaries can still become major successes in traditional cinema. For example, La Marche de l'empereur (March of the Penguins) became the highest-grossing documentary film at the time of its release in 2005. Inspired by the success of March of the Penguins, Disney returned to wildlife films with their Disneynature series (2008–present), programs which share many thematic similarities to the older True-Life Adventures. Large-screen film formats such as IMAX are well-suited for blue-chip nature documentaries, many of which are exclusive to theaters which can support formats at such a scale. Beyond March of the Penguins, many of the highest-grossing nature documentary films represent Disneynature or IMAX productions.

== Television history ==
=== 1950s ===
Many early television-based nature programs were adapted directly from theatrical films and shorts. Heinz Sielmann's Zimmerleute des Waldes (Carpenters of the Forest) achieved widespread interest when broadcast as Woodpecker on the BBC in 1955. Likewise, Disney's True-Life Adventures were often re-edited for use in company shows such as Disneyland (1954–1959) on ABC and Walt Disney’s Wonderful World of Color (1961–1968) on NBC.

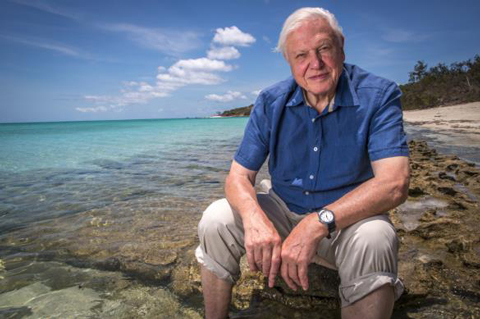
David Attenborough, longest-active and most internationally renowned nature documentary presenter and producer (from Great Barrier Reef, 2015)

In the UK, presenter-led nature radio shows, such as Desmond Hawkins' The Naturalist and James Fisher's Birds in Britain (1951–1963), encouraged the BBC to expand into similar personality-driven television shows. In 1954, the BBC started airing Zoo Quest (1954–1963), featuring David Attenborough embarking on expeditions to capture live wildlife and populate the London Zoo. The BBC's Natural History Unit (NHU) was founded in 1957 to streamline production on nature documentaries. Both Attenborough and the NHU have become the most renowned and respected forces in the genre, releasing numerous high-profile documentaries up to the present day.

On NBC, Don Meier and Marlin Perkins cooperated on Zoo Parade (1950–1957), which had a similar format to Zoo Quest albeit for the benefit of the Chicago Zoo. Other early nature documentaries include CBC's Fur and Feathers (1955–1956), hosted by Ian McTaggart-Cowan, and Look, a studio-based BBC magazine-program with filmed inserts, hosted by Sir Peter Scott from 1955 to 1981.

=== 1960s ===
As color television grew in popularity, NBC's Meier-Perkins collaboration expanded into Wild Kingdom (1963–1988), which merged the sensibilities of Disney's colorful nature films with the constraints of television production. The National Geographic Society began to produce television specials for CBS in the mid-1960s, including influential nature documentaries such as Miss Goodall and the Wild Chimpanzees (1965) and The World of Jacques-Yves Cousteau (1966).

The first 50-minute weekly documentary series, The World About Us, began on BBC2 in 1967 with a color installment from the French filmmaker Haroun Tazieff, called "Volcano". Around 1982, the series changed its title to The Natural World, which the BBC Natural History Unit in Bristol continued to produce as of 2023. In 1961, Anglia Television produced the first of the award-winning Survival series, which lasted up until 2001. It was eventually axed when the network introduced a controversial new schedule which many commentators have criticized as "dumbing down".

=== 1970s-1990s ===
Between 1974 and 1980, the Spanish nature documentary television series El Hombre y la Tierra (The Man and the Earth), produced by TVE and presented by naturalist Félix Rodríguez de la Fuente, used 35 mm film, which posed significant logistic and technical challenges at the time. The show gained international recognition. During the late 1970s and early 1980s, several other television companies round the world set up their own specialized natural-history departments, including the Australian Broadcasting Corporation in Melbourne, Australia and TVNZ's unit in Dunedin, New Zealand — both still in existence, the latter having changed its name to "NHNZ".

Cruel Camera was a 1982 exposé as part of CBC's The Fifth Estate, focusing on animal cruelty in Hollywood films and nature documentaries, including staged scenes in True-Life Adventures and Wild Kingdom. Although nature documentaries practically disappeared from American broadcast television in the 1980s, cable channels quickly picked up the slack. Discovery Channel was founded in 1985, and TBS began to air nature documentaries in 1986, during its hold over the National Geographic Explorer series. PBS, which benefited greatly from a 1980 export of BBC's Life on Earth, quickly entered into a long-lasting agreement to distribute and co-produce BBC programs. It also produced several series of its own, including Nature (1982–present) and Wild America (1982–1994). Animal Planet, an entire cable channel originally focused on nature documentaries, was founded in 1996 as a joint venture between Discovery Communications and BBC Worldwide. International co-productions have become the norm, as nature documentary production costs and global appeal continue to rise.

Technological experiments have long been a mainstay of the genre, sometimes creating hybrid programs which defy easy categorization. Big Cat Diary (1996–2008) was the first of many nature programs with a serialized story, purportedly documenting the daily lives of big cat families. The BBC Walking with... television franchise, narrated by Kenneth Branagh, used computer-generated imagery (CGI) and animatronics to represent prehistoric life, in a similar manner to how nature documentaries represent living animals. The series started with the critically and commercially successful Walking with Dinosaurs (1999), which was followed by an array of sequels, spin-offs, and imitators going into the new millennium.

=== 2000s-present ===
Nature documentaries, particularly massive BBC-produced blue chip productions, continue to attract attention in the new millennium. Series such as The Blue Planet (2001) and Planet Earth (2006), and their sequels Planet Earth II (2016) and Blue Planet II (2017), have led to several waves of revitalization in the genre, to the point that some studies regard this period as a "blue-chip renaissance". Technological changes such as improved cameras, digital color grading, large-screen TVs, drones, and streaming services all contribute to improved spectacle, helping to drive the current popularity of nature documentaries.

Although blue-chip nature documentaries are typically defined by their emphasis on pristine nature without human influence, modern environmental issues (including climate change) are increasingly integrated into these spectacle-driven programs. Some documentaries leave environmental messaging for their final episode (such as Frozen Planet [2011] and Planet Earth II), while others make environmental issues a core theme through the entire series (such as Our Planet [2019]). This trend is coupled with the rise of "dual-message" or "green-chip" documentaries, which portray both the beauty and fragility of nature.

== Content ==
Most nature documentary films or television series focus on a particular species, ecosystem, or scientific idea (such as evolution). Although most take a scientific and educational approach, some anthropomorphise their subjects or present animals purely for the viewer's pleasure. In a few instances, they are presented in ethnographic film formats and contain stories that involve humans and their relationships with the natural world, as in Nanook of the North (1922), The Story of the Weeping Camel (2003), and Grass: A Nation's Battle for Life (1925).

Although almost all have a human presenter, the role varies widely, ranging from explanatory voice-overs to extensive interaction or even confrontation with animals.

One popular variant on the genre is commonly known as the "blue-chip" wildlife film. "Blue-chip" productions are typically characterized by an emphasis on charismatic megafauna, spectacular visuals, and dramatic storylines, while downplaying or outright removing scientific jargon, political themes, historical reference points, and human interaction with the natural world. In essence, these programs aim to depict nature as a vision of pristine timelessness, a fully artistic perspective without scientific context. As exemplified by programs such as Planet Earth (2006), a "renaissance" of blue-chip documentaries has been made possible due to improvements in camera technology and video quality, leading to an improved sense of spectacle.

Most nature documentaries are made for television and are usually of 45 to 50 minutes duration, but some are made as full-length cinematic presentations.

Such films include:

- Among the Great Apes with Michelle Yeoh (2009)
- Animals Are Beautiful People (1974)
- Chang: A Drama of the Wilderness (1927)
- Coral Reef Adventure (2003)
- The Cove (2009)
- Encounters at the End of the World (2007)
- Grizzly Man (2005)
- The Last Paradises: On the Track of Rare Animals (1967)
- The Leopard Son (1996)
- The Living Desert (1953)
- March of the Penguins (2005)
- Microcosmos (1996)
- Sharkwater (2006)
- Serengeti Shall Not Die (1959)
- Serengeti Symphony (1998)
- The Silent World (1956)
- The Story of the Weeping Camel (2003)
- Grass: A Nation's Battle for Life (1925)
- The Vanishing Prairie (1954)
- The Wild Parrots of Telegraph Hill (2003)
- White Wilderness (1958)
- Winged Migration (2001)

In addition, the BBC's The Blue Planet and Planet Earth series have both been adapted by BBC Worldwide and Greenlight Media for theatrical release.

In some cases, nature documentaries are produced in the short subject form and are subsequently screened in theaters or broadcast on television. Often they are about the relationship between humans and nature. Notable examples include:

- Agafia's Taiga Life (2013)
- Grand Canyon (1958)
- In Beaver Valley (1950)
- The Land (1942) 45-minute documentary made for the U.S. Department of Agriculture
- The Plow That Broke the Plains (1936)
- The River (1938)
- Seal Island (1948)

Every two years the Wildscreen Trust, of Bristol in the UK presents the Panda Awards for nature documentaries.

== Analysis and criticism ==
The "naturalness" of nature documentaries has been disputed by reporters and academics alike, and wildlife filmmakers acknowledge that tropes and techniques common in fictional media are commonplace in the nature documentary genre.

=== Staged events ===
Many nature documentaries include footage of staged events which appear "natural", while actually being contrived by filmmakers or occurring in captivity. This was the norm in early productions within the genre, though it has been extensively scrutinized in more recent decades.

In one infamous example of a staged conflict, Disney's White Wilderness (1958), the filmmakers pushed lemmings off a cliff into ice-cold waters, where they died. This scene was staged at Alberta's Bow River, using a spinning turntable and lemmings captured in Manitoba. It was written to depict a behavior which naturalists recognized as a myth long before the scene was filmed. Staged conflicts in Disney's True-Life Adventures and Mutual of Omaha's Wild Kingdom were first brought to light through Cruel Camera, a 1982 exposé on filmed animal cruelty. El Hombre y la Tierra (1974–1981) also frequently resorted to staged conflicts.

Less abusive examples are still common in modern nature documentaries, motivated by a desire to record intimate situations while minimizing disturbance to wild animals. For example, Frozen Planet (2011) used footage from a specially constructed den in a Dutch zoo to film a polar bear giving birth. Hidden Kingdoms (2014) constructed small foliage-covered stages when filming close-ups of small animals. In Blue Planet II (2017), some close-ups of corals, a mantis shrimp, and a fangtooth were filmed in laboratory conditions.

Trained animals are sometimes used in scenes which are difficult to film using wild animals. Flight of the Snow Geese (1972) implemented both wild and trained snow geese in separate plotlines, and Winged Migration (2001) used similar techniques while only acknowledging the use of trained birds in behind-the-scenes content.

=== Post-production techniques ===
Nature documentaries rely on long telephoto camera lenses to film animals from a safe distance, though microphones are unable to pick up sound with the same fidelity at range. Due to the difficulties of recording sounds on location, it is common for nature documentary makers to add sounds in post-production using Foley and sound effect libraries.

Compositing and computer-generated imagery are sometimes used to construct shots. For example, CGI can depict geographical features or internal organs, and chroma key compositing can combine studio sets (such as those used to film plants in time-lapse) with natural backgrounds. Replacing filmed animals with CGI equivalents is rare but not unheard of: Turtle: the Incredible Journey (2009) featured both live-action and CGI turtles over the course of its story. Some animal-focused educational programs use CGI to depict animals which are extinct (such as Walking with Dinosaurs in 1999) or fictional (such as The Future is Wild in 2002).

=== Narrative and anthropomorphism ===
Wild animals are often filmed over weeks or months, so the footage must be condensed to form a narrative that appears to take place over a short space of time. Such narratives are also constructed to be as compelling as possible—rather than necessarily as a reflection of reality—and make frequent use of voice-overs, combined with emotional and intense music to maximise the audience's engagement with the content. One common technique is to follow the "story" of one particular animal, encouraging the audience to form an emotional connection with the subject and to root for their survival when they encounter a predator. In 1984, David Attenborough stated:

There is precious little that is natural ... in any film. You distort speed if you want to show things like plants growing, or look in detail at the way an animal moves. You distort light levels. You distort distribution, in the sense that you see dozens of different species in a jungle within a few minutes, so that the places seem to be teeming with life. You distort size by using close-up lenses. And you distort sound. What the filmmaker is trying to do is to convey a particular experience. ... The viewer has to trust in the good faith of the filmmaker.

Nature documentaries have been criticized for leaving viewers with the impression that wild animals survived and thrived after encounters with predators, even when they sustain potentially life-threatening injuries. They also cut away from particularly violent encounters, or attempt to downplay the suffering endured by the individual animal, by appealing to concepts such as the "balance of nature" and "the good of the herd".

Anthropomorphism is a controversial approach to storytelling which is used to some degree in nearly every nature documentary. Some commentators argue that it risks distorting or overwriting facts, vilifying threatened species (such as sharks and hyenas), and making viewers more concerned with the fate of individual animals rather than broader threats to a species' existence. Heteronormativity and related cultural conventions (monogamy, heterosexuality, natalist motivations) are omnipresent in documentary scripts despite their limited application to the natural world. One study linked an increase of empathy created by an anthropomorphized script to a positive attitude towards animal welfare and a desire to donate.

=== Effects on pro-environmental behavior ===
There is mixed evidence for the idea that nature documentaries encourage their audience to protect nature. Nature documentaries can heighten both hedonic feelings (pleasure) and eudaimonic feelings (contemplation, meaning, or insight), and the latter response may indirectly encourage pro-environmental beliefs.

In a 2009 study, students who watched a pair of insect documentaries scored higher on tests of attitude, knowledge, and empathy towards insects. Similar effects were published in 1985 (using a documentary on marine mammals) and 2018 (using a documentary on the Great Barrier Reef). A 2016 study found that a documentary on eagles had no effect on making its viewers feel more connected to nature, at least compared to the control group (who watched a documentary on Einstein). It did lead to more desire to donate to conservation in participants who already had pro-environmental leanings.

Some commentators have proposed a "Blue Planet effect", linking Blue Planet II (2017) to greater public interest in minimizing plastic pollution in the UK. Google searches, newspaper coverage, and parliamentary debates relevant to plastic pollution all increased substantially during and after the series released. Conversely, one study indicated that, despite gaining environmental knowledge, survey takers were no less likely to choose plastic drinks and snacks (as opposed to paper) after watching Blue Planet II. In a survey of local marine management preferences in Scotland, participants who watched Blue Planet II correlate with less desire to pay for more extensive management.

Nature documentaries are effective at bringing new species to the attention of a large audience. Both large and small animals featured in Planet Earth II (2016) experienced a peak of Twitter and Wikipedia attention while the series was airing, with attention staying at above-average levels over the following six months. However, there was no corresponding increase in donations for two sampled environmental organizations. Some species did not receive attention because the script used an evocative name which redirected audiences to the wrong species (for example, a loggerhead shrike being named as a "butcherbird"). The Green Planet (2022) also increased Google and Wikipedia attention for featured plant species, which the study authors applauded as a strategy to combat plant blindness.

Another study indicated that two major nature documentaries (Blue Planet II and Seven Worlds, One Planet) were less effective at generating Wikipedia attention for conservation topics compared to a relatively smaller environmental documentary (Extinction: The Facts).

== Notable filmmakers ==
Among the many notable filmmakers, scientists, and presenters who have contributed to the medium include:

- James Algar
- Sir David Attenborough
- Harry Butler
- Gordon Buchanan
- Richard Brock
- Jacques Cousteau
- Jeff Corwin
- Gerald Durrell
- Alastair Fothergill
- Robert Flaherty
- Félix Rodríguez de la Fuente
- Bernhard Grzimek
- Tim Haines
- Judy Irving
- Steve Irwin
- Simon King
- Hugo van Lawick
- Nigel Marven
- Greg MacGillivray
- Ian McTaggart-Cowan
- Desmond Morris
- Neil Nightingale
- George Page
- Marlin Perkins
- Coyote Peterson
- Jacques Perrin
- Louie Psihoyos
- Eugen Schuhmacher
- Heinz Sielmann
- Marty Stouffer
- Mark Strickson
- David Suzuki
- Valmik Thapar

== Notable series ==
=== Sir David Attenborough ===
Sir David Attenborough's contributions to conservation are widely regarded, and his television programs have been seen by millions of people throughout the world. Series narrated and/or presented by him include:

- Zoo Quest (1954–1964)
- Life on Earth (1979), 13 episodes
- The Living Planet (1984), 12 episodes
- The First Eden (1987)
- Lost Worlds, Vanished Lives (1989)
- The Trials of Life (1990), 12 episodes
- Life in the Freezer (1993), 6 episodes
- The Private Life of Plants (1995), 6 episodes
- The Life of Birds (1998), 10 episodes
- State of the Planet (2000)
- The Blue Planet (2001), 8 episodes
- The Life of Mammals (2002), 10 episodes
- Life in the Undergrowth (2005), 5 episodes
- Planet Earth (2006), 11 episodes
- Life in Cold Blood (2008), 5 episodes
- Life (2009), 10 episodes
- Nature's Great Events (2009)
- Madagascar (2011)
- Frozen Planet (2011), 7 episodes
- Kingdom of Plants 3D (2012), 3 episodes
- Africa (2013)
- Galapagos 3D (2013)
- Life Story (2014)
- David Attenborough's Conquest of the Skies 3D (2015), 3 episodes + Extra
- The Hunt (2015)
- Planet Earth II (2016), 6 episodes
- Blue Planet II (2017), 7 episodes
- Dynasties (2018)
- Our Planet (2019), 8 episodes
- Seven Worlds, One Planet (2019), 7 episodes
- A Perfect Planet (2021)
- The Green Planet (2022), 5 episodes
- Prehistoric Planet (2022–2025), 15 episodes
- Dynasties II (2022)
- Wild Isles (2023)
- Our Planet II (2023)
- Planet Earth III (2023), 8 episodes
- Asia (2024)
- Parenthood (2025)
- Kingdom (2025)
- Blue Planet III (2026)

=== Steve Irwin ===
Steve Irwin's documentaries, based on wildlife conservation and environmentalism, aired on Discovery Channel, and Animal Planet. The series comprises:

- The Crocodile Hunter (1992–2004), 74 episodes
- The Crocodile Hunter: Collision Course (2002), Movie
- The Crocodile Hunter's Croc Files (1999), 52 episodes
- The Crocodile Hunter Diaries (2001–2003), 30 episodes
- Ocean's Deadliest (2006)

=== Other ===
- Andes to Amazon (2000)
- Animal Atlas (2004–)
- Ark on the Move (1982)
- Banded Brothers (2010)
- The Bear Family & Me (2011)
- Big Cat Week (2013)
- British Isles – A Natural History (2004)
- Corwin's Quest (2005)
- Congo (2001)
- Cousins (2000)
- Dark Days in Monkey City (2009)
- Earth: The Power of the Planet (2007)
- Earthflight (2011)
- Escape to Chimp Eden (2008)
- Europe: A Natural History (2005)
- Eyewitness (British TV series) (1994-1997)
- The First Eden (1987)
- The Future Is Wild (2002)
- The Great Rift: Africa's Wild Heart (2010)
- Ganges (2007)
- Great Migrations (2010)
- Going Wild with Jeff Corwin (Disney Channel, 1997–1999)
- El Hombre y la Tierra (1974–1981)
- Hidden Kingdoms (2014)
- How the Earth Was Made (2009)
- How the Universe Works (2010, 2012, 2014)
- The Human Animal (1994)
- Human Planet (2011)
- In the Womb (2005–2010)
- Insectia (1999)
- Inside Life (2009)
- The Jeff Corwin Experience (2001–2003)
- Journeys to the Ends of the Earth (1998)
- King of the Jungle (Animal Planet, 2003–2004)
- Land of the Tiger (1997)
- Last Chance to See (2009)
- Lemur Street (2007–2008)
- Life on Our Planet (2023)
- The Living Edens (1997)
- Madagascar (2011)
- Meerkat Manor (2005)
- The Most Extreme (2002)
- Nature (1982–)
- Natural World (1983–2020)
- The Nature of Things (1960–)
- Ocean Mysteries with Jeff Corwin (ABC, 2011–14)
- Oceans (2008)
- Orangutan Diary (2009)
- Orangutan Island (2007)
- Our Universe (2022)
- Our Oceans (2024)
- Penguin Island (2010)
- Planet Earth: The Future (2006)
- Really Wild Animals (1993–98)
- The Really Wild Show (1986–2006)
- River Monsters (2009)
- Saving Planet Earth (2007)
- Sea Rescue (2012–2018)
- Secrets of the Whales (2021)
- The Secret Life of Elephants (2009)
- South Pacific (2009)
- State of the Planet (2000)
- The Stationary Ark (1975)
- Supernatural: The Unseen Powers of Animals (2008)
- Survival (1961–2001)
- Suzuki on Science (1971)
- Weird Nature (2001)
- Wild Africa (2001)
- Wild Caribbean (2007)
- Wild Down Under (2003)
- Wild Kingdom (1963–1988)
- Yellowstone (2009)

== See also ==
- List of documentary films
- List of insect documentaries
