= Mike deGruy =

American documentary filmmaker (1951–2012)

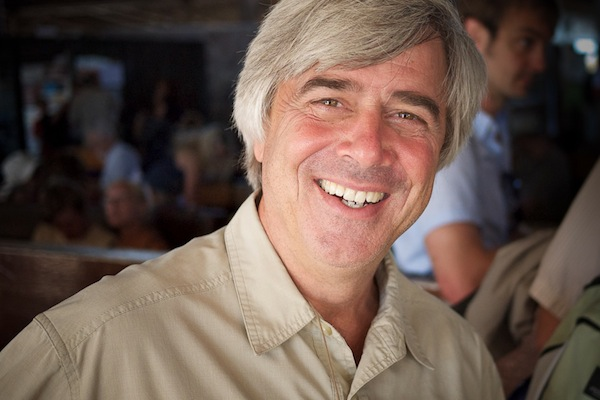
- DeGruy in 2010
- Born: Michael V. deGruy; December 29, 1951; Mobile, Alabama, United States
- Died: February 4, 2012 (aged 60); Jaspers Brush, New South Wales, Australia
- Known for: Underwater cinematography
- Website: www.mikedegruy.com

Michael V. deGruy (December 29, 1951 – February 4, 2012) was an American documentary filmmaker specializing in underwater cinematography. His credits include Life in the Freezer, Trials of Life, The Blue Planet and Pacific Abyss. He was also known for his storytelling, including a passionate TED talk about his love of the ocean on the Mission Blue Voyage. His company, Film Crew Inc., specialized in underwater cinematography, filming for the BBC, PBS, National Geographic, and the Discovery Channel. His notable accomplishments include diving beneath thermal vents in both the Atlantic and Pacific oceans. He was a member of many deep sea expeditions and was a part of the team that first filmed the vampire squid and the nautilus.

== Life ==
Mike deGruy was attacked on April 2, 1978, by a grey reef shark. He was severely bitten on his lower right forearm.

The Deepwater Horizon oil spill of 2010 impacted him and began his shift to environmental activism.

He was also part of the Deepsea Challenge, where James Cameron went to the bottom of the Mariana Trench.

== Death ==
On February 4, 2012, deGruy died in a helicopter crash at Jaspers Brush near the town of Berry in New South Wales, Australia. The crash also claimed the life of Australian filmmaker Andrew Wight. Marine biologist Edith Widder dedicated her 2013 TED talk detailing the first filming of the giant squid to his memory.

In 2016, production began on a feature-film documentary about his life and work titled Diving Deep: The Life and Times of Mike deGruy. The documentary was released in 2020.
