= Nile (TV series) =

- Genre: Documentary film
- Starring: Catherine Schell; Kenneth Haigh; Michael Gough
- Narrated by: Simon MacCorkindale
- Composer: David Mitcham
- Country of origin: United Kingdom
- Original language: English
- No. of seasons: 1
- No. of episodes: 3

Production
- Executive producer: Mike Gunton
- Producers: Gavin Maxwell; Tim Scoones; Martha Holmes
- Cinematography: Richard Kirby
- Editors: Martin Elsbury; Jo Payne; Nigel Buck
- Running time: 60 minutes

Original release
- Network: BBC Two
- Release: 27 February – 12 March 2004

The Nile is a 2004 BBC Television documentary that tells the history and natural history of the Nile.

== Production ==
The series was produced by the BBC Natural History Unit in co-production with the Discovery Channel.

Episode three includes footage from the 1971 BBC Television mini-series The Search for the Nile.

== Reception ==
=== Reviews ===
The Times calls it an, "enlightening BBC series", that, "uses stunning photography and restrained dramatisations to pay homage to the longest river on Earth."

"Unfortunately, programmes that deal with impressive chunks of nature often adopt a portentous tone featuring sunsets, awed narration and emphatic music. It has a deadening effect, like living in a state of perpetual crescendo. But the photography is wonderful, and the programme explains clearly how the Ancient Egyptians fused together the natural and supernatural worlds."

— The Times

The reviewer concludes, "never mind the cardboard dramatisations – this is an heroic story."

=== Ratings ===
- Episode two (2004-03-07): 3.4 million viewers (15% audience share).

=== Awards ===
- Shanghai International TV Festival 2005
  - Won: Magnolia Award for Best Photography in a Nature Documentary: Richard Kirby

== Episodes ==
Mankind has looked on this river and wondered on its mysteries, where it comes from, why it floods every year, and how flowing through the desert for thousands of kilometres it never runs dry. Many died attempting to unravel its secrets; in doing so they became legends themselves, their names forever bound to the great river. Journey along this river through the ages into the heart of Africa, a river that has shaped history, a river with the power to change the lives of all that encounter it, the Nile.

— Simon MacCorkindale's opening narration

=== Episode one: Crocodiles and Kings ===
It’s the longest river on Earth; flowing from the heart of the continent, it has written a story across the landscape as it forges its way North, through mountains, forests, marsh and desert. For centuries its waters have sustained life in some of the harshest places on Earth, without it this corner of Africa would be only rock and dust and sand. Civilisations have risen and fallen on its banks, without its gifts the pyramids would never have been built.

— Simon MacCorkindale's opening narration

Since the dawn of history the annual floodwaters have risen to transform the desert into a fertile paradise where the great civilisation of Ancient Egypt grew, but their existence was on a knife-edge held hostage by the river. The Pharaoh tried to maintain the balance by appeasing the gods to ensure the gifts of the river.

The New Kingdom of Rameses and Tutankhamun began 3,500 years ago with the province of Thebes at its heart, and farmers, fishermen and temple builders thrive with the blessings of the rivers. At dawn hamadryas baboon climb to the top of the temples to great the sun god Ra who rides across the sky in his chariot, a sharp-eyed peregrine falcon bursts from the sun as a manifestation of the all-seeing Horus, and a feared cobra hunts in the fields its poisonous venom manifesting the suns burning rays. The scarab beetle embodies the sun's daily journey, born from the ground it sculpts a sphere of dung to feed its young which emerge again in perfect continuity, while a Nile catfish feeling its way with long whiskers guides the sun back to the east for its rebirth.

The Old Kingdom of the Pyramids had been destroyed by a 20-year drought that starved much of the population; now as the waters dry up the people turn for protection to the Pharaoh who is the son of Osiris. Osiris taught the people cultivation but was murdered by his brother Seth and scattered across the land only to re-emerge as a symbol of fertility while Seth was banished to the desert from where he threatens to return with famine and death. Female Hippos, fighting to defend their young, are worshipped as Tort; Crocodiles, welcoming the heat that maintains their body temperature, are worshipped as Sobek; and flocks of sacred Ibis, signalling the arrival of the flood, are worshipped as Thoth. The land is transformed into a flooded plain while the Pharaoh oversees the construction of dams and channels to tame the floods.

The receding waters leave behind thick fertile silt from which frogs and toads are born as symbols of the land's resurrection. The farmers sow their seeds as memorial to Osiris who in reborn again in the harvest crops only to be devoured by a swarm of locusts that poison whatever is left with their droppings. Wild dogs and jackals, scavenging the overflowing cemeteries, are worshipped as Anubis. The pharaoh death leaves the country in chaos as the body is mummified with a scarab amulet placed on the heart. As the drought approaches, with no pharaoh to intercede with the gods, Egyptian vultures flock over the river as a symbol of death. The Pharaoh, buried with precious provisions for his final journey, enters the Hall of Judgment where his heart is weighed against a feather by the gods.

The pharaoh is found worthy earning his place among the gods and the Nile rises again to revitalise the valley and sustain a civilisation that would inspire all those that followed.

==== Cast ====
- Ali Mohamed Soliman
- Ali Ahmed Mokhtar
- Lee Fern

==== Crew ====
- Producer & Director: Gavin Maxwell
- Editor: Martin Elsbury

=== Episode two: The Great Flood ===
The Nile, draining over 3 million km^{2} of Africa, then flowing through one of the harshest deserts in the world, it is the world’s longest river. This river was the powerhouse behind the world’s first great civilisation, without the Nile’s extraordinary fertility there would be no Tutankhamun, no Cleopatra, no pyramids; it changed the world forever.

— Simon MacCorkindale's opening narration

The annual flooding of the Nile brought the water and fertile volcanic soil that made the Ancient Egyptian civilisation possible, but impassable rapids made it impossible for them to discover the source of this bounty they attributed to the gods. The river stretches into Sudan through a forbidding desert known as the Belly of Stones that was home to the Black Pharaohs of the Nubian kingdom of Kush who once ruled over their Egyptian neighbours. The Blue and White Niles merge in the Longest Kiss in History at the crossroad city of Khartoum.

The White Nile flows through the impenetrable swamps of the Sudd where shifting islands of papyrus buoyed by air-sacks in the steams long prevented further exploration. White-eared kob form one of Earth's greatest concentrations of large animals as they graze the neighbouring grasslands during the dry season. The native Dinka cowherds rely on their cattle for a diet of milk and blood supplemented only by fish when possible. The Dinka and kob are forced on the move as rains swell the swamp, bursting its banks and doubling its size. A lungfish emerges from its cocoon of mud and mucus and uses its primitive lungs to breathe air while it reaches for the nearest pool only to be caught in the oversized beak of the giant shoebill stalk, while family groups of speckle-throated otter and the powerful Nile monitor also hunt the waters. The Dinka and kob return and a stranded catfish crawls to safety as the waters evaporate in the sun but this is not the source of the Great Flood.

The Blue Nile flows through dry savannah from a deep barren gorge on the fringe of the Ethiopian Highlands where the lammergeier vulture seeks out those who succumb to the drought. A volcanic plug that rose up 30 million years ago has left the region with Africa's highest mountains, where the hippos of Lake Tana live in the continent's highest body of water. The dry highland dome above is home to Earth's highest density of rodents and the Egyptian wolf which digs them up. The indigenous gelada baboons feed exclusively on grass using their massive teeth only for the intimidation of rivals. Moisture-laden clouds from the Congo Basin bring annual rains to Africa’s Water Tower that transforms the rodent's world with lush vegetation for food and cover from predators like the auger buzzard. Night time freezing breaks up the topsoil of one of the oldest areas of cultivated land in Africa and it is washed downstream to the lake where pelicans gather to feed and weaver birds build papyrus nests. The Christian highland farmers beg the pagan river spirit Guion for mercy at times of great flood.

Ancient Egyptians had heard rumours of Lake Tana but had no idea how important the Blue Nile that flows over the Smoking Fire Falls with its fertile volcanic soil was to their civilisation.

==== Crew ====
- Producer: Tim Scoones
- Editor: Jo Payne

=== Episode three: The Search for the Source ===
From the heart of Africa to the Mediterranean Sea runs the world's longest river. Since the Egyptians first settled along its banks men have dreamt of discovering where the Nile was born, but for centuries the river kept its secrets close. The obsession grew and by the mid-19th century some were prepared to risk their lives to be the first to discover the source of the Nile.

Nomads first settled along the banks of the Nile around 5000 BC and replenished by annual floodwaters grew into the Ancient Egyptian civilisation but the source of the miraculous waters remained a mystery to them.

The Royal Geographical Society dispatched Richard Burton and John Speke to Lake Tanganyika to find the source in 1857 but unable to complete their mission Speke separated from the main party and discovered Lake Victoria. The vast lake retains water like a vast reservoir with evaporations drained back by surrounding mountains. Speke returned with James Grant a year later and discovered the outlet at Ripon Falls. The new moon rains trigger the emergence of vast breeding swarms of flies that plagued the expedition. Speke and Grant headed downstream from the outlet but were forced to take refuge at Gondokoro. Here they met with Samuel Baker and his wife who had travelled up stream in search of the source and discovered Lake Albert in 1864.

The newspaper reporter H.M. Stanley was sent to Africa in 1871 to find Dr. Livingstone who had vanished five years earlier exploring Lake Tanganyika. Together they searched unsuccessfully for the outflow till the time came for Stanley to return home. Following Livinstone's death Stanley returned in 1874 to map all three lakes but was prevented from completing his work by warring tribes. He returned in 1881 and discovered Lake Edward that he concluded creates a vast reservoir system with the other lakes that feeds the Nile. The Mountains of the Moon between the humid forest of the Congo Basin and the monsoon lands of East Africa attract rains which, regulated by the forests of mosses, liverworts, ferns and lichens, trickle down into Lakes Albert, Edward and George to feed the Nile.

Tectonic movements created a vast plateau in East Africa 10-15 million years ago and the Mountains of the Moon 12 million years ago. The East African Rift fractured along the flank of the plateau collecting water into Lakes Albert, Edward and George 8 million years ago and the plateau depressed filling into Lake Victoria less than 1 million years ago. Lake Victoria, swelled by the wet climate phase at the end of the last ice age, broke its banks 12,500 years ago and flowed into Lake Albert creating a new river that cut north into the flatlands of Sudan where it joined by the sediment filled Blue Nile before following into the Egyptian desert where it gave birth to a civilisation 7,000 years later.

==== Cast ====
- Keith Buckley as Young Stanley
- John Colclough as Old Stanley
- John Quentin as John Hanning Speke
- Norman Rossignton & Paul Volrath as Samuel Baker
- Catherine Schell & Ilonka Van Veen as Florence Baker
- Kenneth Haigh as Richard Burton
- Michael Gough as David Livingstone
- Ian McCulloch & Adrian Sandy as James Grant
- André van Gyseghem as Sir Roderick Murchison

==== Crew ====
- Producer: Martha Holmes
- Editor: Nigel Buck

== Companion book ==
- Holmes, Martha; Gavin Maxwell & Tim Scoones (19 February 2004). Nile. BBC Books (hardcover). ISBN 978-0-563-48713-5.
