= The World About Us =

BBC television documentary series

The World About Us was a BBC Two television documentary series on natural history which ran from 3 December 1967 to 20 July 1986. The show was created by David Attenborough.

The French marine scientist and photographer Jacques Cousteau made a documentary for the series, starting in 1968 with The Undersea World of Jacques Cousteau.

The series also featured Jane Goodall, again in 1968 and was narrated by Desmond Morris. While Goodall was noted for her work with chimpanzees, the series also featured her work with wild African dogs in a 1973 episode. Morris's work "Manwatching" was the subject of an episode in 1977.

An episode narrated by Wilfred Thesiger about his journey through, and his love for, the "Empty Quarter" desert won several awards in 1968 (Trento International Film Festival 1967, Melbourne Film Festival 1968, International Addis Ababa Film Festival 1968).

The 400th edition was broadcast on 29 August 1976 and the series continued into the late 1980s.

The series marked the evolution of natural-history broadcasting "to the point at which constantly improving photographic techniques, allied to a seemingly inexhaustible supply of subject matter," make recurring series possible.

The series is considered a precursor to Life on Earth (1979), a highly acclaimed BBC natural-history documentary series also presented by Attenborough.

The title sequence was created by Bernard Lodge with music by Johnny Scott; it was parodied in two Look Around You fictional schedule sketches as Tlentifini Maarhaysu.

== See also ==
- BBC Natural History Unit
