= The Dark: Nature's Nighttime World =

- Genre: Nature documentary
- Directed by: Susanna Handslip; Will Ridgeon; Rowan Musgrave
- Presented by: Gordon Buchanan; Sophie Darlington; Justine Evans; George McGavin; Bryson Voirin
- Narrated by: Andy Serkis
- Country of origin: United Kingdom
- Original language: English
- No. of episodes: 3

Production
- Executive producer: Tim Martin
- Production locations: Central and South America
- Running time: 60 minutes
- Production companies: BBC Natural History Unit; Discovery Channel; Terra Mater Factual Studios

Original release
- Network: BBC Two
- Release: 29 July – 12 August 2012

The Dark: Nature's Nighttime World is a three-part nature documentary series produced by the BBC Natural History Unit which follows an expedition to Central and South America to film animals at night. The presenting team is made up of biologist Dr. George McGavin, large mammal expert Bryson Voirin and wildlife filmmakers Gordon Buchanan, Sophie Darlington and Justine Evans. They are equipped with the latest low-light filming technology, including thermal imaging and infrared cameras, enabling them to film natural behaviour without disturbing the wildlife, even in pitch-black conditions. During the course of the six-month expedition, the team visit five countries (Costa Rica, Venezuela, Brazil, Peru and Chile) enlisting the help of local field scientists to locate and film rare species and new behaviour. The team obtain footage of nocturnal specialists such as vampire bats and owl monkeys and witness the nighttime activities of jaguars and pumas at close quarters.

The series was a co-production between the BBC, Discovery Channel and Terra Mater Factual Studios. The executive producer for the BBC was Tim Martin, the series producer was Jonny Keeling and the score was composed by Jonathan Gunton. The series was produced and directed by Susanna Handslip, Rowan Musgrave and Will Ridgeon. It was first broadcast on BBC Two in the United Kingdom, starting on 29 July 2012, with a voiceover by Andy Serkis.

The Dark: Nature's Nighttime World is the fifth of the BBC Natural History Unit's "Expedition" series, following Expedition Borneo (2006), Lost Land of the Jaguar (2008), Lost Land of the Volcano (2009) and Lost Land of the Tiger (2010).

== Episodes ==
No.	Title	Produced and Directed by	Original release date
1	"Central American Jungle"	Rowan Musgrave	29 July 2012
The expedition begins in Costa Rica. Buchanan tries his luck on nighttime walks through the forest, hoping to find mammals, and is rewarded with footage of opossum, kinkajous and howler monkeys. Voirin has close encounters with a Brazilian tapir and a bull shark and McGavin and Darlington film the jungle's invertebrate life, including trapdoor spiders and net casting spiders catching their prey. Evans stakes out a turtle nesting beach which is known to be frequented by jaguars at night. Filming from an elevated hide, she witnesses an intimate encounter between two of the cats. Moving to the ground the following evening, she films a large male walking directly towards her. As the jaguar passes within a few feet of her hide, her fear and exhilaration escalates.
2	"Amazon Flooded Forests"	Will Ridgeon	5 August 2012
To explore the Amazon basin, the team split into three group. McGavin joins a caving team to visit a newly discovered cave system in a Venezuelan tepui, discovering cave specialists including spiders, catfish and a swimming cricket, all of which are likely to be new species. Darlington and Voirin travel by river steamer into Peru's flooded forest, where they film three-toed sloths, pink river dolphins and owl monkeys. In the Pantanal, Buchanan follows up reports of nocturnal activity by giant anteaters, a species normally seen during the day. By setting remote camera traps, he obtains footage of the anteaters climbing tree trunks, behaviour never filmed before. He speculates that the anteaters are marking territory.
3	"Patagonian Mountains"	Susanna Handslip	12 August 2012
The expedition moves to the southern tip of South America for the final programme. They base themselves in Torres del Paine National Park in Chilean Patagonia, home to the highest density of pumas in the world. Voirin and Evans track the big cats on foot and by car, and film them hunting guanaco, feeding and playing at night. McGavin leaves Patagonia to investigate the mystery of a colony of vampire bats on an island off the coast of northern Chile. He locates the bat colony in a cave and attaches a radio transmitter to one of the animals. The signal leads the team to a sea lion colony where Darlington films the bats biting and feeding on the sea lions. Buchanan films humpback whales in the Magellan Straits, revealing how they come so close to shore at night. He suggests that the whales are escaping the strong currents by wrapping themselves in kelp fronds, allowing them to sleep.

== DVDs ==
In United Kingdom, a single DVD (BBCDVD3602) has been released on 19 September 2012 by 2 Entertain.
