= Justine Evans =

British wildlife filmmaker (born 1966)

- Born: 1966 (age 59–60); Richmond, London, UK
- Occupation: Wildlife filmmaker
- Years active: 1991–present
- Website: justineevans.com

Justine Evans is a British wildlife filmmaker featured in many BBC Natural History Unit productions such as Planet Earth, Life, and Frozen Planet. She is a canopy specialist and an expert on filming nocturnal animals.

== Career ==
Evans graduated from film school at Bournemouth & Poole College of Art and Design in 1991. Shortly thereafter, she started filming short campaigns for the RSPB about lowland heathland bird habitats in her spare time and ended up working closely with the BBC Natural History Unit as a camerawoman and presenter of several nature films and series.

=== As a camerawoman ===
In 1997, Evans first appeared as an additional cinematographer in "Wild Wolves", a BBC-produced episode for the American popular science television series Nova. In 1998, she travelled to Venezuela as part of the filming team of The Life of Birds, which was produced by Mike Salisbury and presented by David Attenborough. In one of the episodes, she filmed oilbirds in a cave using low light cameras, with Attenborough providing commentary in the dark.

On episode seven, "Great Plains", of the series Planet Earth, Evans and her colleagues were able to film a pride of 30 lions hunt an elephant in the dark. Evans used infrared night vision equipment to film the hunt after following the animals for several days in harsh conditions. Until then, the ambush techniques used by a pride of lions had never been filmed before.

In 2009, and as part of the episode "Primates" of the BBC documentary series Life, Evans went to Guinea to film chimpanzees. The chimpanzeest had created an entire tool kit to dip for ants, pound and soften palm hearts using leaf stalks, and to hammer nuts with precision.

In 2013, using starlight cameras, Evans filmed the social nocturnal behaviour of black rhinos in the Kalahari as part of the BBC documentary series Africa. This was the first time that the behaviour was filmed.

=== As a presenter ===
In more recent productions, Evans has moved in front of the camera to appear on screen in several natural history expeditions.

In the Lost Land of the Tiger series, Evans is in Bhutan with Gordon Buchanan, Steve Backshall, George McGavin, and big-cat biologist Alan Rabinowitz to determine whether there are tigers in this area of the Himalayas. In the first episode, Evans appears at the top of a tree looking for tigers and other nocturnal animals with night vision equipment when a tropical lightning storm hits.

In 2013, Evans travelled to the forests of Myanmar with wildlife filmmaker Gordon Buchanan and zoologist Ross Piper for the BBC documentary series Wild Burma: Nature's Lost Kingdom. Their mission was to establish whether Burma's forests were indeed a crucial stronghold for iconic animals rapidly disappearing from the rest of the world, such as Asian elephants, tigers, pangolins, and a host of rare jungle cats, as well as to demonstrate the incredible diversity of all species in the area.

== Awards and nominations ==
- Evans won a News & Documentary Emmy award in the category Outstanding Individual Achievement in a Craft: Cinematography – Nature as one of the cinematographers for Great Migrations at the 32nd News & Documentary Emmy Awards in 2011.
- Evans was nominated for a Primetime Emmy for Outstanding Cinematography for Nonfiction Programming (single or multi-camera) in 2004 and 2005 for her low-light camera work on Survivor: Palau and Survivor: Guatemala.
