= Alderney Bird Observatory =

- Abbreviation: ABO Ltd
- Formation: 2016; 10 years ago
- Type: Registered charity
- Purpose: Monitoring bird migration and seabird colonies
- Headquarters: Telegraph House
- Location: Alderney, Channel Islands
- Official language: English
- Warden: John Horton
- Website: Alderney Bird Observatory

Alderney Bird Observatory is a bird observatory on the island of Alderney, in the Channel Islands. It was set up in March 2016 with the logistical support of the Alderney Wildlife Trust to study bird migration and the island's seabird colonies. In April 2019 it became 'Alderney Bird Observatory Ltd', a Channel Islands registered company and charity. A 2018 meeting of the Bird Observatories Council declared it the 20th accredited bird observatory in the British Isles.

The observatory was featured on the BBC's Countryfile on 15 May 2016.

In its first year the observatory recorded 180 species including five new to the island, showing the importance of Alderney as a ″stop-over″ for migrant birds. Thirteen thousand birds were ringed including 777 storm petrel (Hydrobates pelagicus) and 500 gannet (Morus bassanus).
