= Marine conservation activism =

Non-governmental efforts to bring about change in marine conservation

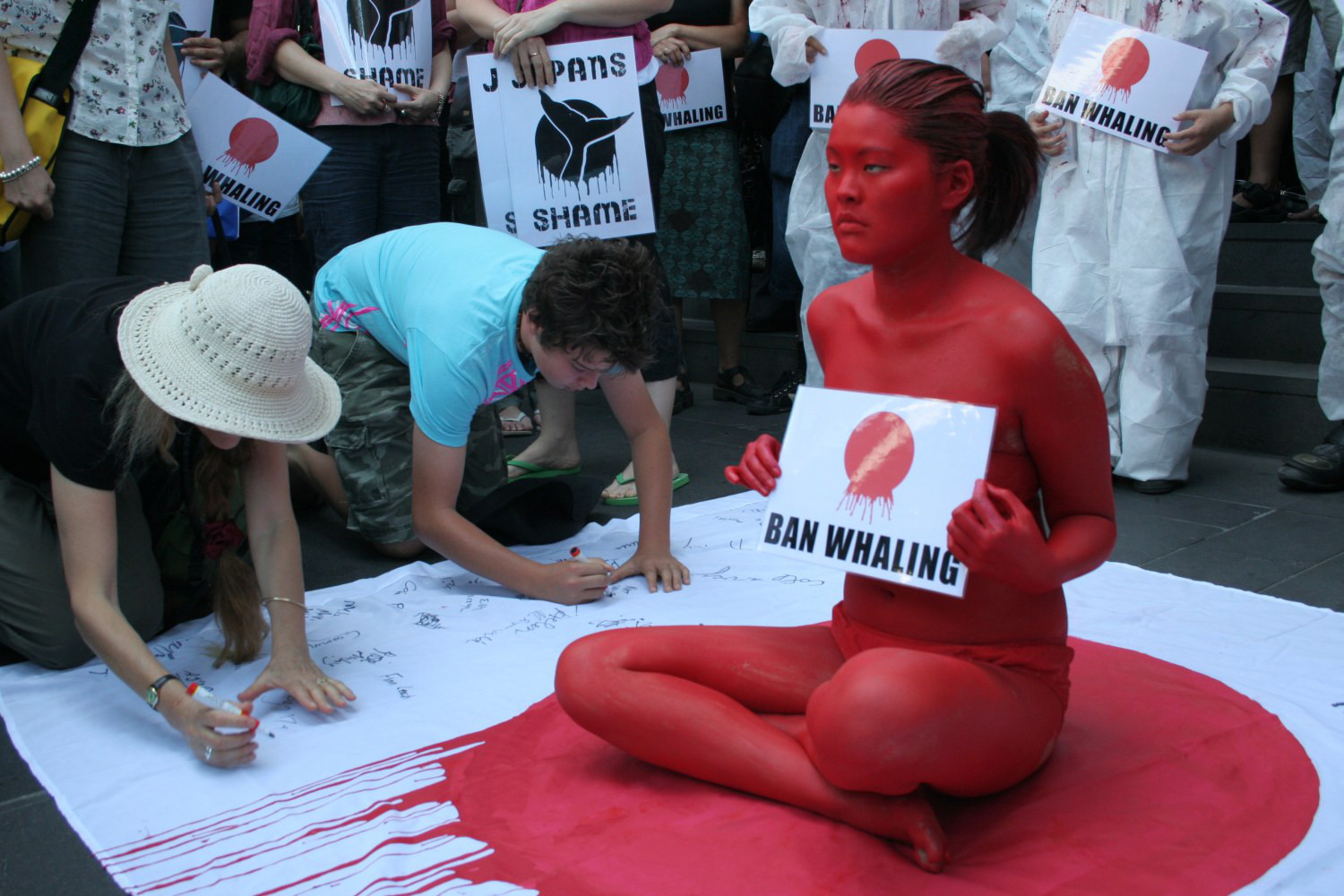
A 2007 anti-whaling protest in Melbourne by Animal Liberation Victoria.

Marine conservation activism is the efforts of non-governmental organizations and individuals to bring about social and political change in the area of marine conservation. Marine conservation is properly conceived as a set of management strategies for the protection and preservation of ecosystems in oceans and seas. Activists raise public awareness and support for conservation, while pushing governments and corporations to practice sound ocean management, create conservation policy, and enforce existing laws and policy through effective regulation. There are many different kinds of organizations and agencies that work toward these common goals. They all are a part of the growing movement that is ocean conservation. These organizations fight for many causes including stopping pollution, overfishing, whaling and by-catching, and supporting marine protected areas.

== History ==
=== United States ===
Though the environmental movement began in the United States during the 1960s, the idea of marine conservation really did not take off in the country until the 1972 Marine Protection, Research, and Sanctuaries Act (MPRSA) passed, beginning the movement. The act allowed the regulation by the United States Environmental Protection Agency (EPA) over dumping in the seas. Though the act was later amended, it was one of several key events to bring marine issues towards the front of environmental issues in the United States.

=== Notable people ===
- Jacques Cousteau: Explorer, Conservationist, Researcher & Author
- Sylvia Earle: Marine Biologist, Explorer, & Author
- Steve Irwin: Naturalist, Conservationist, Zoologist, Herpetologist, & Television Personality

==== Ric O'Barry ====
Ric O'Barry is an author of the books Behind the Dolphin Smile and To Free a Dolphin: A Dramatic Case for Keeping Dolphins in their Natural Environment, by the Trainer of "Flipper", both focusing on dolphin preservation. O'Barry was also the star of Oscar award-winning documentary, The Cove, which aimed to raise public support for preventing dolphin drive hunting. On April 22, 1970, he founded the Dolphin Project, a non-profit marine environmentalist organization concentrating on dolphins' welfare.

==== Paolo Bray ====
Founder and Director of major sustainability certification programs: Dolphin-Safe, Friend of the Sea and Friend of the Earth. Environmentalist and promoter of conservation projects and campaigns.

Since 1990, Director of International Programs for the DOLPHIN-SAFE project of the Earth Island Institute. The project saved millions of dolphins from tuna fishing nets. 95% of world tuna industry adhere to the project.

In 2008 founded Friend of the Sea, the major international certification for sustainable seafood and the only one covering both fisheries and aquaculture. The only seafood certification recognized by the national accreditation bodies. Over 800 companies in 70 countries have products certified Friend of the Sea. Certifying also sustainable shipping, whale watching, aquaria, ornamental fish. Friend of the Earth supports conservation projects

In 2016 founded Friend of the Earth an international certification of products from sustainable agriculture and farming. 50 companies from 4 continents have products certified Friend of the Earth (including rice, oil, wine, tomato, quinoa, cheese, eggs, etc.). Friend of the Earth support also conservation projects.

== International issues ==
=== Debris ===
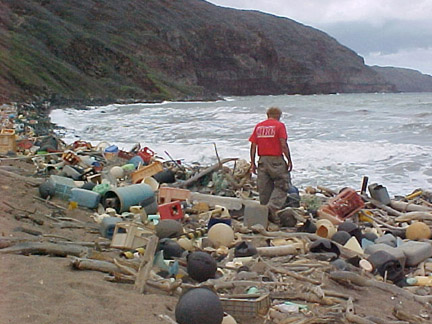
Marine debris on the Hawaiian coast

Marine debris is defined as "any persistent solid material that is manufactured or processed and directly or indirectly, intentionally or unintentionally, disposed of or abandoned into the marine environment or the Great Lakes". This debris can injure or even kill marine organisms; it can also interfere with navigation safety and could pose a threat to human health. Marine debris can range from soda cans to plastic bags and can even include abandoned vessels or neglected fishing gear.

Ocean Conservancy is a non-profit environmental group that fights for the improvement and conservation of marine ecosystems and marine life. They work to find science-based solutions to protect the world's oceans from the global challenges that they face today. One of the many issues that they work closely to stop is the flow of trash that enters the ocean. The International Coastal Cleanup (ICC) is one of the methods Ocean Conservancy uses to prevent marine debris. The ICC is the largest volunteer effort to clean up the world's oceans and other waterways; over the past 25 years the ICC has cleaned up approximately 144,606,491 pounds of trash from beaches all over the world.

=== Whaling ===
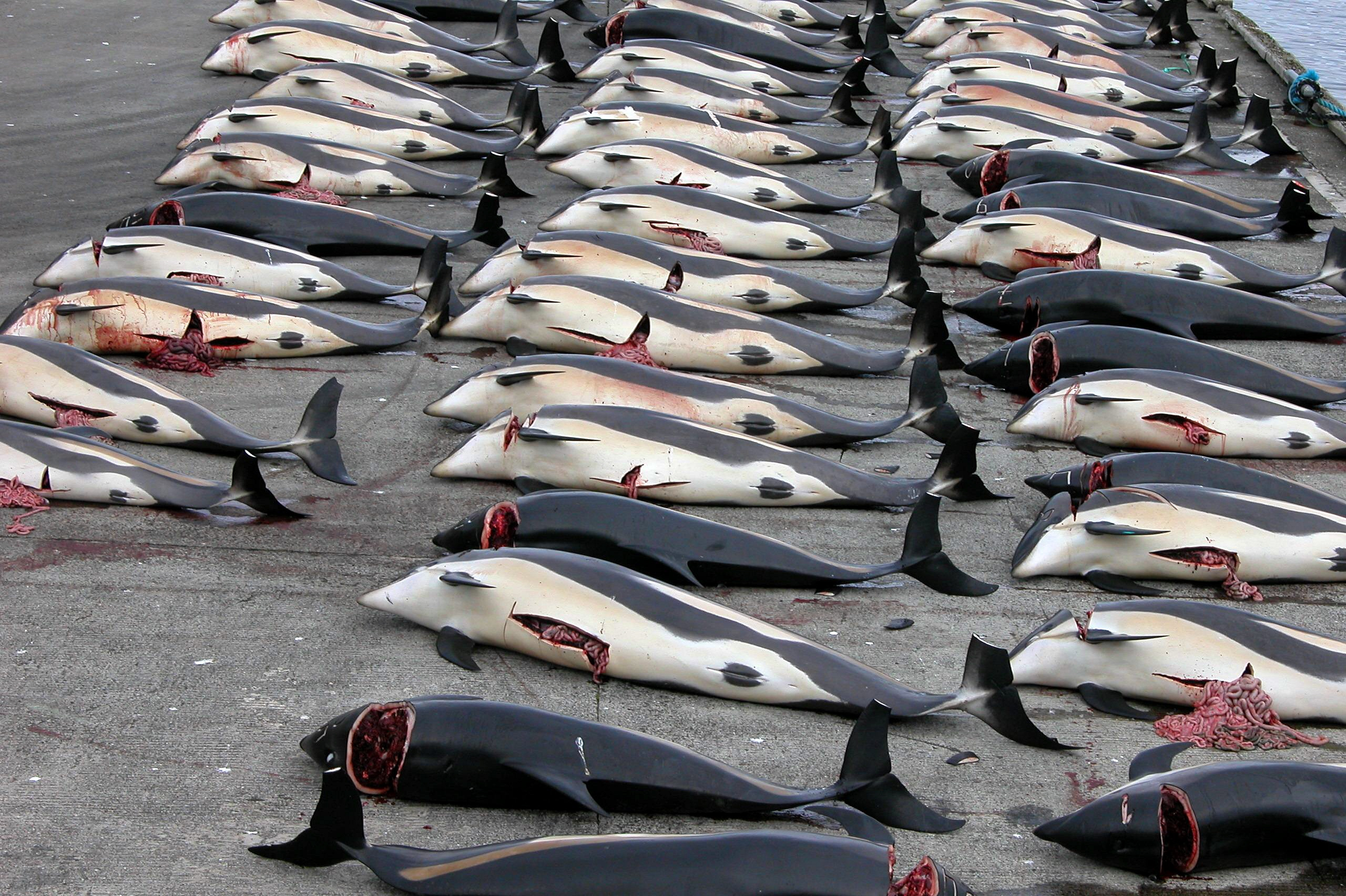
Whaling in the Faroe Islands

==== International Whaling Commission ====
Whaling is the hunting of free roaming whales; many whaling practices have led to drastic population loss in many whale populations around the world. In 1986, The International Whaling Commission (IWC) decided to ban commercial whaling due to population decline. The commission recognizes three different types of whaling: aboriginal subsistence, commercial, and special permit (or scientific) whaling.

===== Aboriginal subsistence whaling =====
This form of whaling supports indigenous communities where whale products play an important role in cultural and nutritional life. The IWC sets catch limits for aboriginal subsistence whaling every six years.

===== Commercial whaling =====
This form of whaling is highly regulated by the IWC and is currently on a moratorium. There are a few countries that oppose the moratorium and continue to hunt for whales; these countries share catch data with the commission but are not regulated by it.

Since the moratorium was put in place in 1986, more than 50,000 whales have been hunted and killed; there are three nations that are still able to hunt whales because of loopholes in the ban. Norway is able to hunt because of an "objection" to the ban; Iceland is able to hunt because of a "reservation" and Japan is able to hunt because they claim it is for "research purposes". If combined these nations kill around 2,000 whales each year; these whales include humpback, minke, sperm, fin, Bryde's, and sei. The IWC ban does allow for some Aboriginal Subsistence Whaling (ASW) in certain countries.

===== Special permit/scientific whaling =====
This category of whaling is separated from IWC-regulated whaling by international law. Special permit research proposals are to be submitted by countries to the IWC for scientific scrutiny. The role of the IWC is advisory only.

==== Greenpeace ====
Greenpeace, an international environmental organization founded in 1971 in British Columbia, fights against whaling. Their campaigns are nonviolent and many times involve one or more of the five Greenpeace ships which first made the organization famous in the 1970s. In late December 2005, Japanese whaling fleets experienced heavy opposition from Greenpeace, who protested that the Japanese were continuing their commercial whaling under the guise of research, which was being done in the Southern Ocean Whale Sanctuary. They sent volunteer workers in inflatable boats to get in the line of fire in order to stop the whaling.

==== Sea Shepherd Conservation Society ====
Sea Shepherd Conservation Society is a non-profit, marine wildlife conservation organization that works internationally on numerous campaigns to protect the world's oceans. Their mission is to conserve and protect the world's ecosystems and species; they work to end the destruction of habitat and slaughter of the ocean's wildlife. Unlike many other non-profit environmental groups, Sea Shepherd uses direct-action tactics to expose and challenge illegal activities at sea; they strive to ensure that the ocean can survive for future generations. In doing so, they refer to the United Nations World Charter for Nature that calls on individuals to "safeguard and conserve nature in areas beyond national jurisdiction".

Sea Shepherd was founded in 1977 by Captain Paul Watson in Vancouver, British Columbia, Canada; it was not until 1981 that it was formally incorporated in the United States. Throughout the years their campaigns have ranged from stopping the annual killing of baby harp seals in Eastern Canada to preventing Japanese whalers from killing endangered whale species. They claim only to work to uphold international conservation law and to protect the endangered ocean habitats and species; they do this without prejudice against race, nationality, color, or religious belief. Their crews are made up of volunteers from all over the world, some of which are from countries that Sea Shepherd has campaigns against; they describe themselves as "pro-ocean" instead of "anti-any nationality or culture".

=== Shark finning ===
Shark finning is a worldwide issue that involves cutting off the fins of sharks. This is done while the shark is still alive followed by the rest of the body being thrown back into the ocean, leaving it to die days after. Used in countries like China and Japan, shark fins are a key ingredient in the world-renowned meal, shark fin soup. The high demand for this particular type of soup has skyrocketed in the last few decades and sells for around $100 on average and is often catered at special occasions such as weddings and banquets. Due to the increased want for these shark fins, traders seek out the fins in order to make a profit. However, the fins are the only part of the shark that fishermen seek out to retrieve due to the low economical value of the actual shark meet. This recently exposed issue along with other overfishing issues has brought upon roughly 80 percent of the shark population decline. It has become prominent concern in marine conservation activism for millions of sharks are killed yearly at an often-unregulated expense.

==== Project AWARE ====
Current campaign known as Project AWARE is working globally to advocate solutions for long-term protection for these animals. Created initially as an environmental initiative project, this campaign was developed by the Professional Associations of Diving Instructors (PADI) in 1989. Used to educate divers about environmental problems this program eventually grew to become a registered non-profit organization in the US in 1992 and eventually became recognized in the UK and Australia in 1999 and 2002 respectively. In spite of the arising issues with marine challenges, Project AWARE has continued to grow towards meeting the needs of the marine ecosystem as they see fit. Marine debris and shark and ray conservation activism are the two most prevalent issues that are being further worked toward improving since 2011.

==== Shark Savers ====
Another campaign working to ensure the protection of these marine species is a group called Shark Savers that is sponsored by the group called WildAid. Through the use of community motivation, the project encourages the public to stop eating sharks and shark fin soup. By also working to improve global regulations and creating sanctuaries for sharks, the project aims to take action and get results. Similarly to Project Aware, the Shark Savers program was founded by a group of divers that wanted to help the marine system in 2007. Through the recent creation of shark sanctuaries, the program focuses on sustainability when thinking about the economical and environmental benefits. These created sanctuaries provide a protected area for the sharks and also promote change in nearby communities.

==== Bite-Back ====
Bite-Back is another organization that is active in the community and aims to stop the sale of shark fins for the making of shark fin soup in Great Britain. By exposing the UK and their acts toward profiting from shark products, they aim to put an end to their ways of over fishing and exploitation. The organizations main goal is to allow marine life a chance to thrive while they are busy doing the dirty work of lowering consumer stipulation.

==== Shark Trust ====
Part of a worldwide alliance called The Global Shark and Ray Initiative (GSRI), the Shark Trust is working in efforts to better the ocean for marine animals such as shark and rays. The Initiative created a plan for changing the status of the shark population that would span over 10 years starting on February 15, 2016. Teaming up with other large conservation organization such as Shark Advocates International and World Wide Fund for Nature (WWF), the team aims to ultimately give these vulnerable animals the safety and security that the ought to have in their natural environment.

=== Overfishing ===
Overfishing occurs when fish stocks are over-exploited to below acceptable levels; eventually the fish populations will no longer be able to sustain themselves. This can lead to resource depletion, reduced biological growth, and low biomass levels. In September 2016, a partnership of Google and Oceana and Skytruth introduced Global Fishing Watch, a website designed to assist citizens of the globe in monitoring fishing activities.

== Marine protected areas ==
Although the idea of marine protected areas is an internationally known concept, there is no one term used internationally. Rather, each country has its own name for the areas. Marine Reserves, Specially Protected Areas, and Marine Park all relate to this concept, though they differ slightly. Some of the most famous marine protected areas are the Ligurian Sea Cetacean Sanctuary along the coasts of Spain, Monaco, and Italy, and Australia's Great Barrier Reef. The largest sanctuary in the world is the Northwestern Hawaiian Islands National Monument. The purpose of these sanctuaries is to provide protection for the living and non-living resources of the oceans and seas. They are created to save species, nursing resources and to help sustain the fish population.

The activists at the Ocean Conservancy fight for this cause. They believe that the United States should put forth a consistent and firm commitment in using marine protected areas as a management strategy. Currently, the argument in the United States is whether or not they are necessary, when it should be how can they work the most efficiently. Activists at the Ocean Conservancy have been working on a campaign called the Save Our Ocean Legacy, a campaign lasting several years trying to establish Marine Protected Areas' off of the California coasts. Twenty-nine Marine Protected Areas were planned to be established when the legislation bill passed in 1999. The hope is that the plan will be finalized in 2007.

Some fishers do not accept that marine protected areas benefit fish stocks and provide insurance against stock collapse. Marine protected areas can cause a short-term loss in fisheries production. However, the concept of spillover, where fish within a marine protected area move into fished areas, thus benefiting fisheries, has been misunderstood by some fishers. The term is a simplification of numerous ecological benefits that are derived from removing fishing from nursery, breeding grounds and essential fish habitats.
