= Expedition with Steve Backshall =

British television documentary series

- Genre: Nature, Documentary
- Directed by: Ali May
- Presented by: Steve Backshall
- Starring: Steve Backshall, Aldo Kane, Katy Fraser
- Composer: Onur Tarcin
- Country of origin: United Kingdom
- Original language: English
- No. of seasons: 2
- No. of episodes: 16

Production
- Executive producer: Wendy Darke
- Producer: Ali May
- Production location: Various
- Editors: Tin Lasseter, Danny McGuire
- Camera setup: Single-camera
- Running time: 45 (62 for Season 2)
- Production company: UKTV

Original release
- Network: Dave
- Release: 21 July 2019 – 9 January 2022

Related
- Expedition Unpacked (Spin-Off)

Expedition with Steve Backshall is a TV nature adventure documentary hosted by naturalist and explorer Steve Backshall.

== Production ==
The show was adopted by PBS during a Fremantle deal. The UK channel Dave rebooted it essentially for an initial 4 episodes, but was extended to 6. After a pre-air date deal, the French channel France Television bought the rights to air it in their country.

== Expedition: Unpacked ==
This spin-off series was commissioned in 2021, going behind the stories of their original episodes.

== Episodes ==
=== Season 1 ===
No.	Title	Original release date	UK viewers (millions)
1	"Oman: Lost Canyon"	21 July 2019	N/A
Steve sets foot in the deepest (400m) canyon in Saudi Arabia.
2	"Bhutan: White Water"	28 July 2019	N/A
Steve Backshall kayaks the uncharted waters of a wild river, seeking help from the Buddhist monastery.
3	"Suriname: Lost World"	29 January 2020	N/A
Encountering unknown animals in the jungle, Steve is in the Guiana Shield.
4	"Suriname: Ghost River"	20 May 2020	N/A
The team explores a surprising natural scene in a concealed, natural world locked away for generations.
5	"Borneo: Dark Shadow"	12 February 2020	N/A
The team rewrites history with rediscovered treasures in Indonesian Borneo.
6	"Oman: Desert Fortress"	27 May 2020	N/A
Steve finds one of the world’s rarest animals while he and a team of rock climbers are in southern Oman.
7	"Arctic: Frozen Frontier"	20 January 2020	N/A
Steve kayaks the biggest fjord in the world during the spring melt in Greenland.
8	"Mexico: Maya Underworlds"	26 July 2020	N/A
Steve finds new artefacts when he crawls through a cave in subterranean Mexico.
9	"Arctic: Ice Mountain"	15 September 2019	N/A
Steve leads a mission to the summit of a large mountain in Greenland.
10	"Mexico: Flooded Cave"	5 February 2020	N/A
Steve and the team push themselves beyond capacity with a cave dive in Mexico.

=== Season 2 ===
No.	Title	Original release date	UK viewers (millions)
11	"Kamchatka: Expedition Grizzly River"	28 November 2021	N/A
Steve returns after a year to kayak the dangerous Kronotsky river with his team and elude the Russian grizzlies.
12	"Saudi Arabia: Expedition Volcanic Underworld"	5 December 2021	N/A
Steve traces the lava tubes in Saudi Arabia with his team.
13	"Kyrgyzstan: Expedition Mountain Ghost"	12 December 2021	N/A
Steve helps a team of scientists track the snow leopard in hopes of protecting the environment it lives in.
14	"Gabon: Expedition Jungle Paradise"	19 December 2021	N/A
Steve heads to the Moukalaba Dou Dou national park to be guided through its natural scenery and see a population of chimps.
15	"Socorro: Expedition Shark Island"	26 December 2021	N/A
Steve helps a team of protectionists track and gather data on a gathering of Great White Sharks in hopes of protecting their declining numbers.
16	"Expedition Unseen"	9 January 2022	N/A
Steve winds up his year with 3 under-filmed new adventures at the places he had been this year.

== Reception ==
In 2022, the programme was nominated for a Broadcast Award in the category Gamechanger Programme of the Year.

Katie Brooks of Birmingham Mail wrote, "Will inspire a new age of explorers."
