= List of rodents discovered in the 2000s =

Several species of rodent have been newly identified in different parts of the world since 2000.

| Scientific name | Common name | Year identified | Location | Notes |
|---|---|---|---|---|
| Baletemys kampalili | Kampalili shrew-mouse | 2022 | Philippines | It is the only species in the genus Baletemys. It is found only on Mount Kampalili, in the highlands of Eastern Mindanao, in the Philippines. |
| Thomasomys burneoi | Burneo's Oldfield mouse | 2022 | Ecuador | |
| Uromys vika | Vangunu giant rat | 2015 | Vangunu, Solomon Islands | This species was described in 2017 from a dead specimen. Live Vanguru giant rats were found in 2021. |
| Mallomys? sp. | Bosavi woolly rat | 2009 | Papua New Guinea | A new species of giant rat, believed to belong to the genus Mallomys. |
| Leptomys paulus Leptomys arfakensis | | 2008 | New Guinea | These two new species belong to the endemic New Guinea rodent genus Leptomys (Murinae). L. paulus is indigenous to the montane forests in the Owen Stanley Range in eastern New Guinea. L. arfakensis is known only from the Arfak Mountains on the Vogelkop Peninsula in western New Guinea. |
| Reithrodontomys musseri | Small harvest mouse | 2009 | Costa Rica | |
| Eliurus danieli | | 2007 | Madagascar | A new species was described from the Parc National de l’Isalo in south-central Madagascar. |
| Isothrix barbarabrownae | | 2006 | Peru | A new species of hystricognath rodent, a spiny rat (Echimyidae) with dense, soft fur. Inhabits Andean cloud-forests at 1,900 m (6,200 ft) in Peru’s Manu National Park and Biosphere Reserve. |
| Tonkinomys daovantieni | | 2006 | Vietnam | T. daovantieni is a new species within a new genus of murid rodent. It was described from talus habitats in the forested tower karst landscape of the Huu Lien Nature Reserve of northeastern Vietnam. |
| Mus cypriacus | | 2006 | Cyprus | |
| Rhynchomys sp. | | 2005/6 | Philippines | A new species of tweezer-beaked rodent was discovered on a mountain in the northern Philippines in 2005, belonging to the genus Rhynchomys. The grey rodent was found atop Mount Tapulao, northwest of Manila, and was expected to be formally named in 2006. |
| Apomys camiguinensis Bullimus gamay | | 2006; 2002 | Philippines | The island of Camiguin in the Philippines is home to two recently discovered mammal species that are found nowhere else in the world. A. camiguinensis is a type of wood mouse with two sets of whiskers. Another new species of mouse, B. gamay, was discovered on the island in 2002. Along with a parrot and a frog, Camiguin has four known endemic species, which is remarkable for an island only 229.8 km^{2} (88.7 sq mi). |
| Laonastes aenigmamus | Laotian rock rat | 2005 | Laos | The Laotian rock rat or kha-nyou, named in 2005 after being discovered for sale as meat on a market in Laos in 1996. This dramatic new rodent was placed in the new genus Laonastes, and was originally placed in a new family Laonastidae. It has since been placed in the ancient family Diatomyidae, making the kha-nyou a "living fossil". |
| Akodon philipmyersi | | 2005 | Argentina | A. philipmyersi is a new species of grass mouse from Argentina. |
| Reithrodontomys bakeri | Guerrero harvest mouse | 2004 | Mexico | A new species of Cricetidae was discovered in the mountains of Guerrero, Mexico. It was named honoring Dr. Robert Baker. It is known only from the type locality. |
| Oryzomys andersoni | Anderson's rice rat | 2004 | Bolivia | A new species of rice rat was discovered in Bolivia. |
| Peromyscus schmidlyi | | 2004 | Mexico | P. schmidlyi is a species of deer mouse from Durango, Mexico. It had long been suspected as a unique species, and this was confirmed in 2004. |
| Rhagomys longilingua | Peruvian arboreal mouse | 2003 | Peru | A new species of Cricetidae – the Peruvian arboreal mouse, or woodpecker mouse – was discovered in Peru. It is unusual in having a long tongue, which it uses to find insects in tree bark, very much like a woodpecker. Its closest relative, the Brazilian Arboreal Mouse (R. rufescens) is one of the world's rarest mammals, with only a handful of specimens ever found. |
| Microtus bavaricus | Bavarian pine vole | 2000 | Germany | The Bavarian pine vole was rediscovered when it was caught in a "living trap" in Germany in 2000. The vole had not been sighted since 1962, and had been declared extinct. |
| Pipanacoctomys aureus Salinoctomys loschalchalerosorum | Golden vischacha rat Los Chalchaleros viscacha rat | 2000 | Argentina | Two new genera of family Octodontidae – Pipanacoctomys and Salinoctomys – were named following the discovery of two type species in Argentina by naturalist Michael A. Mares. P. aureus was discovered in Catamarca Province of northwestern Argentina. It is found only over 10 square miles of salt desert, one of the most restricted ranges of all mammals. S. loschalchalerosorum was discovered in the Gran Chaco thorn forest. |
| Brucepattersonius spp. | Brucies | 2000 | Brazil | Brucies (Brucepattersonius) are ground-dwelling Brazilian rodents, related to South American grass mice, belonging to a genus described in 1998. In 2000 three new species were named - the Guaraní brucie (B. guarani), the Misiones brucie (B. misionensis) and the Arroyo of Paradise brucie (B. paradisus) - bringing the number of known species to eight. |
| Ctenomys paraguayensis | | 2000 | | A new species of Tuco-tuco. |
| Mesomys occultus | Furtive spiny tree rat | 2000 | Brazil | A new species of spiny rat from Brazil. |
| Lophuromys angolensis | Angolan brush-furred mouse | 2000 | Angola | A species of rodent discovered in Angola. |
| Mus fragilicauda | | 2000 | Thailand | A new species of mouse discovered after examining wild-caught mice from the Central Plains of Thailand. |
| Neacomys minutus Neacomys musseri | Bristly mice | 2000 | Brazil | Two new species of bristly mouse from Brazil, of the subfamily Sigmodontinae. |
| Rhipidomys gardneri | Gardner's climbing mouse | 2000 | | A new species of climbing mouse, of the subfamily Sigmodontinae. |
| Cerradomys goytaca | | 2011 | Brazil | A new species from Brazil. |
| Petaurista siangensis | Mebo giant flying squirrel | 2013 | NE India | the Mebo giant flying squirrel (Petaurista siangensis), Choudhury, 2013. |
