= Ocean Conservancy =

Nonprofit environmental advocacy group

- Predecessor: Bill Kardash, Tom Grooms, Roger McManus, Vice Admiral Roger Rufe (USCG Retired)
- Formation: 1972
- Type: Non-profit environmental organization
- Tax ID no.: 23-7245152
- Purpose: Arctic, aquaculture, marine conservation activism, Trash-Free Seas, Gulf Restoration and fisheries, marine protected area, Coast and marine spatial planning
- Location: Washington, D.C., United States
- CEO: Janis Searles Jones
- Website: www.oceanconservancy.org

Ocean Conservancy (founded as The Delta Corporation) is a nonprofit environmental advocacy group based in Washington, D.C., United States. The organization seeks to promote healthy and diverse ocean ecosystems, prevent marine pollution, climate change and advocates against practices that threaten oceanic and human life.

== History ==
The Ocean Conservancy was founded in 1972 by Bill Kardash as Delta Organization. Initially established to protest commercial whaling, the group launched their first initiative in 1978. The initiative was the Whale Protection Fund, which collected 500,000 signed petitions and presented them at the International Whaling Commission's annual meeting in London.

The organization's name was changed in 1975 to the Center for Environmental Education (CEE), shifting the focus to raising awareness about environmental and marine life conversation and issues. Recognizing the need for legislation to protect marine healthy and safe ocean ecosystems and to help prevent things that threaten oceanic and human life.

During the 1980s, the CEE expanded its focus to encompass broader goals of protecting ocean wildlife. This shift coincided with a significant development in 1982 when the International Whaling Commission imposed a ban on commercial whaling. Inspired by this milestone, the CEE started advocating for the conservation of various marine species and habitats. To further advance its mission, the organization launched the Marine Sanctuary Program in the 1986, and hosted the very first International Coastal Cleanup in 1986. Through this initiative, the organization actively lobbied for the creation of coastal wildlife preserves, seeking to establish protected areas that would safeguard and preserve critical marine ecosystems.

In 1989, CEE became the Center for Marine Conservation (CMC), and expanded it scope to address specific issues like overfishing, marine pollution, habitat destruction and unsustainable coastal development. In 2001, the organization was officially renamed the Ocean Conversancy. The conservancy's main concern was to restore sustainable American fisheries and protect wildlife from human impact.

The organization with the help of more than 19 million volunteers and employees, has enacted new initiatives and goals, including advocating for strong ocean policies, conducting scientific research, fostering collaborations, and empowering communities to protect and restore the health of oceans and coastal habitats.

=== Previous names ===
- Delta Corporation (1972–1975)
- Center for Environmental Education (CEE) (1975–1989)
- Center for Marine Conservation (CMC) (1989–2001)
- Ocean Conservancy (2001— )

== Initiatives ==
=== Sustainable Fisheries Programs (1992) ===
After a four-year advocacy effort, the Ocean Conservancy helped enact a Congressional rewrite of the Magnuson–Stevens Fishery Conservation and Management Act in 1996, which changed how fisheries are managed. The act remains the nation's primary fisheries law. Before 1996 the law contained no provisions to stop overfishing or require the rebuilding of fish stocks. There was no prohibition of bycatch when fish and animals were caught unintentionally by fishing gear or nets targeting specific species. Nor was there a directive to protect fish habitats. The organization lobbied successfully to close these loopholes and establish more sustainable fishing practices.

=== Seal Rescue Fund (SRF) (1979) ===
The Ocean Conservancy aims to protect marine mammals and their habitats. In 1979, the organization established the Seal Rescue Fund (SRF) to protect marine mammals from commercial exploitation. Its efforts to ban whaling resulted in the International Whaling Commission adopting an international moratorium on commercial whaling in 1982. In 1984, Ocean Conservancy led efforts against the U.S.-sanctioned fur seal hunt by blocking the renewal of the North Pacific Fur Seal Treaty in the Pribilof Islands, as well as efforts to protect dolphins from the tuna industry. Ocean Conservancy also assisted in the creation of the dolphin-safe tuna-labeling program.

=== Sea Turtle Rescue Fund (1987) ===
The organization's efforts to save sea turtles from being victim to bycatch resulted in federal and state regulations requiring the use turtle excluder devices (TEDs) in shrimp trawl gear, saves thousands of turtles each year. The organization's Sea Turtle Rescue Fund appealed directly to shrimpers to voluntarily address the problem of sea turtles drowning in their nets.

The Ocean Conservancy played a major role in derailing proposals to reopen international trade in sea turtle products and in ending Japanese imports of hawksbill sea turtle shells.

=== International Coastal Cleanup (1986–present) ===
One of the organization's concerns involves setting up ocean cleanups where volunteers can gather to remove trash from their local oceans. The main event of the organization is the International Coastal Cleanup, a day where over 150 countries gather to clean up beaches and oceans. The movement was created by Linda Maraniss and Kathy O'Hara in 1986 when they organized the Ocean Conservancy's first local cleanup event.

Since this first cleanup, more than 17 million volunteers have helped to pick up over 300 million pounds of trash from the ocean. Scientists have confirmed that about 8 million metric tons of plastic are added to oceans yearly, prompting the International Coastal Cleanup to take place and expand yearly. To easily track the trash being picked up, the organization launched an app called Clean Swell in 2015. A user can log and photograph the trash they pick up, and the information is then sent to Ocean Conservancy's global trash database. The data contained in this database is available at no cost, for example to study the quantities of plastic waste in different countries. With eight million metric tons of plastic entering the oceans each year, a new goal was launched dedicated to stopping the flow of all new plastic into the ocean by 2030.

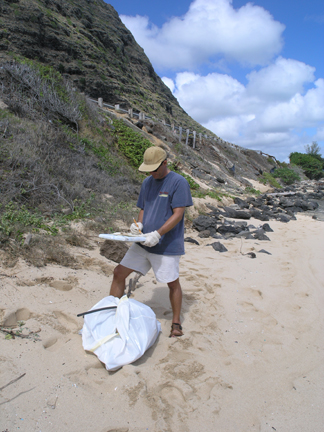
International Coastal Cleanup on the beaches of Hawaii, 2005

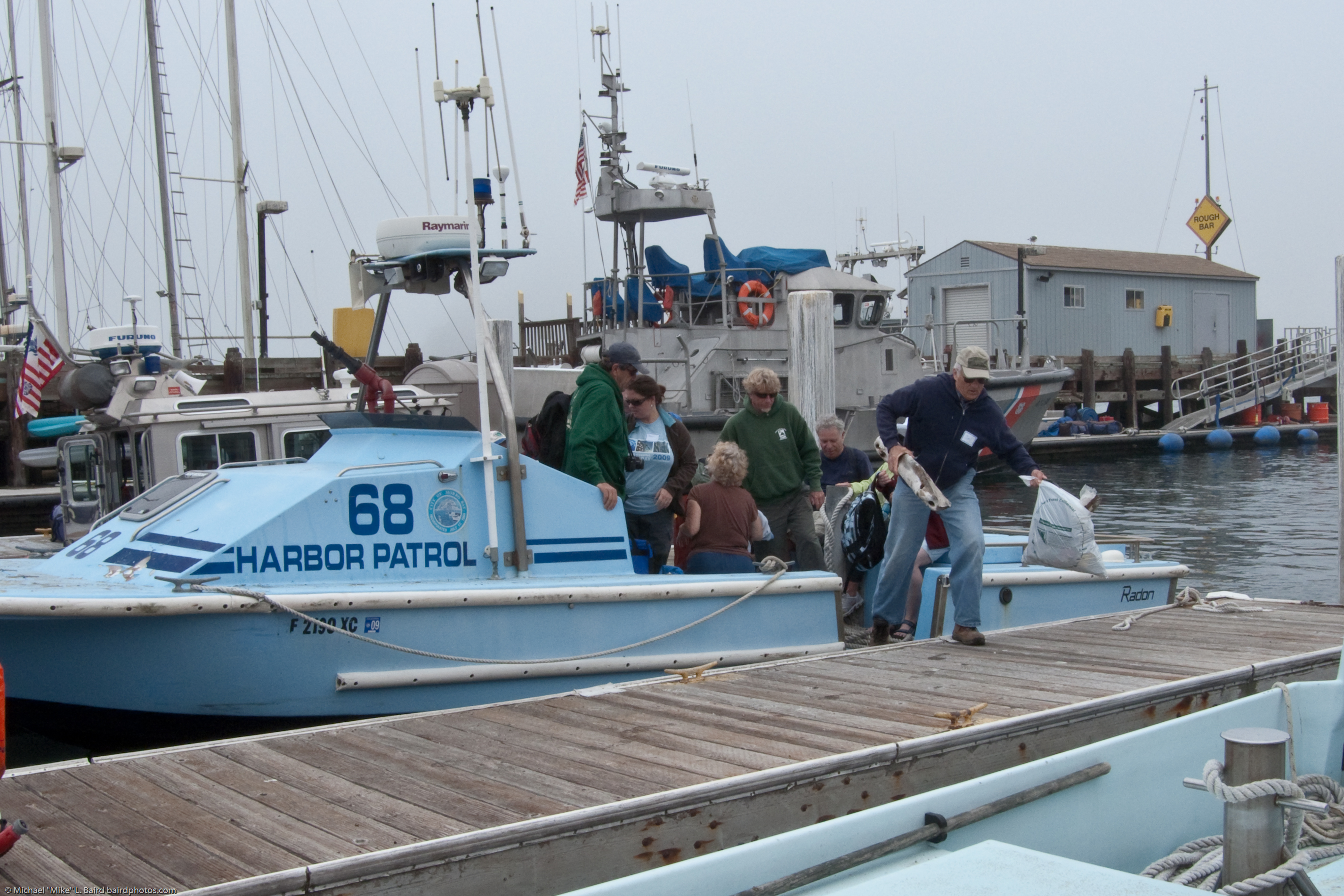
Cleanup group returns from Morro Bay, 2009

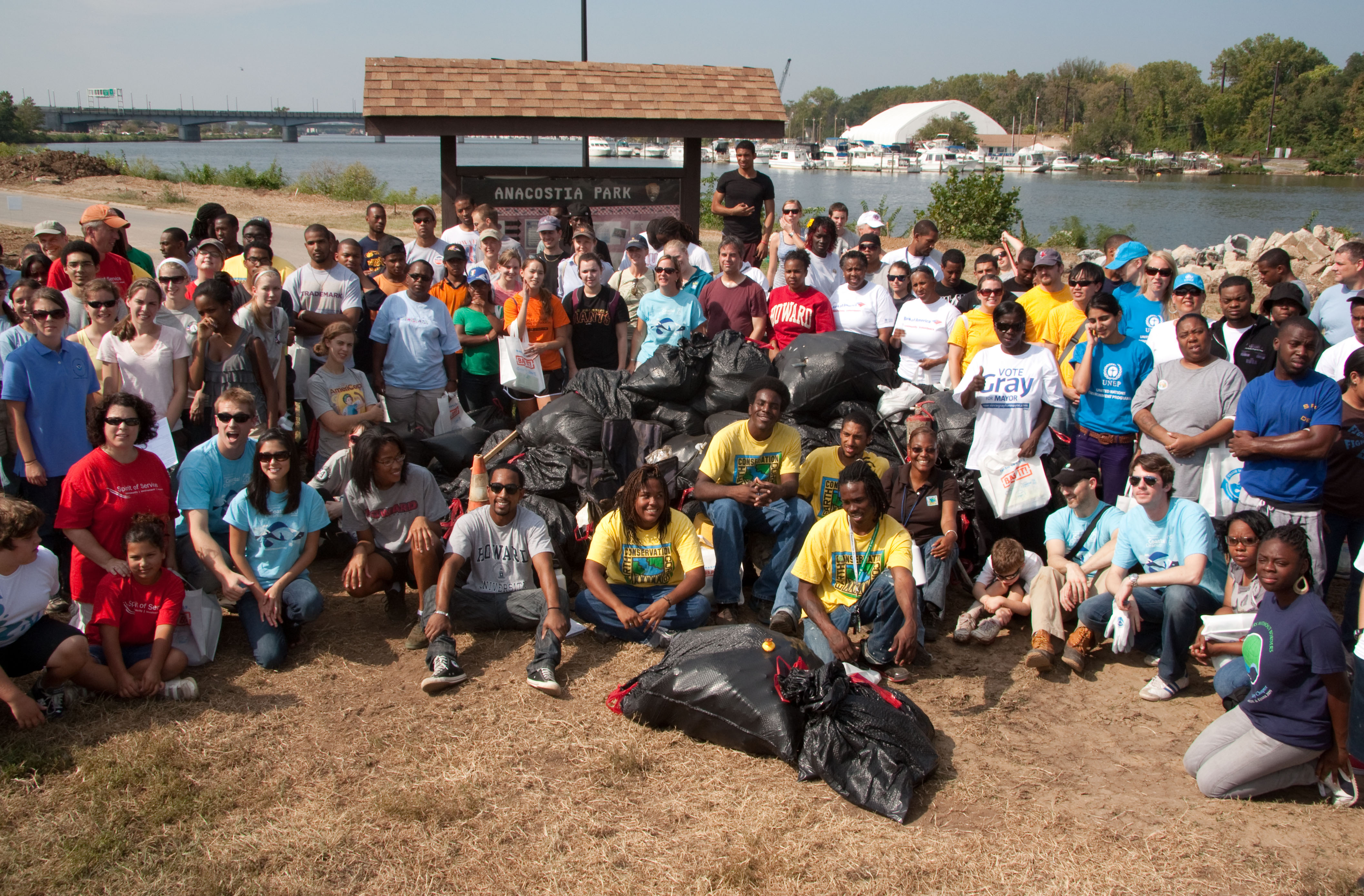
Group of volunteers cleaning up beaches, 2010

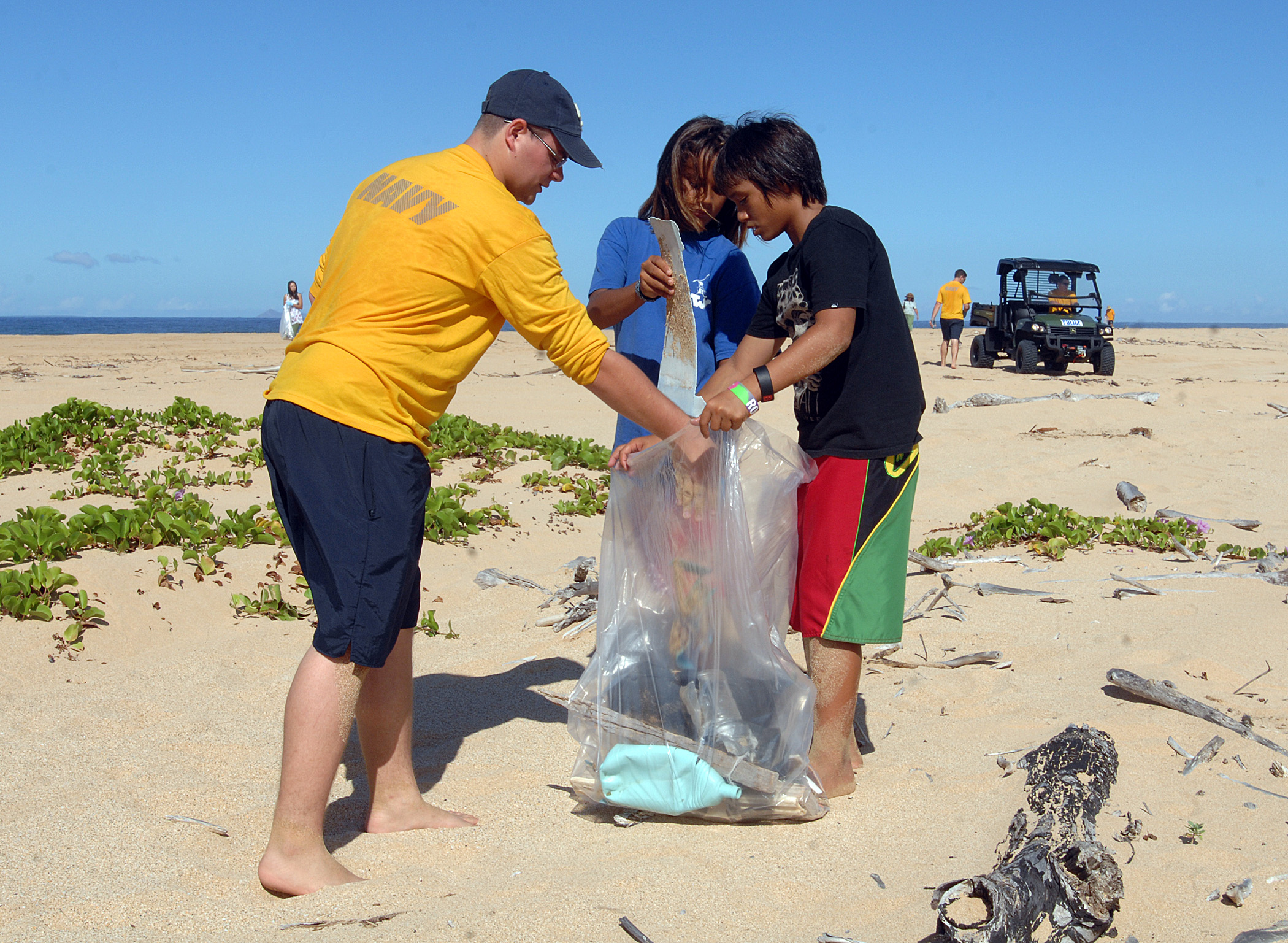
Barking Sands, Hawaii cleanup, 2011

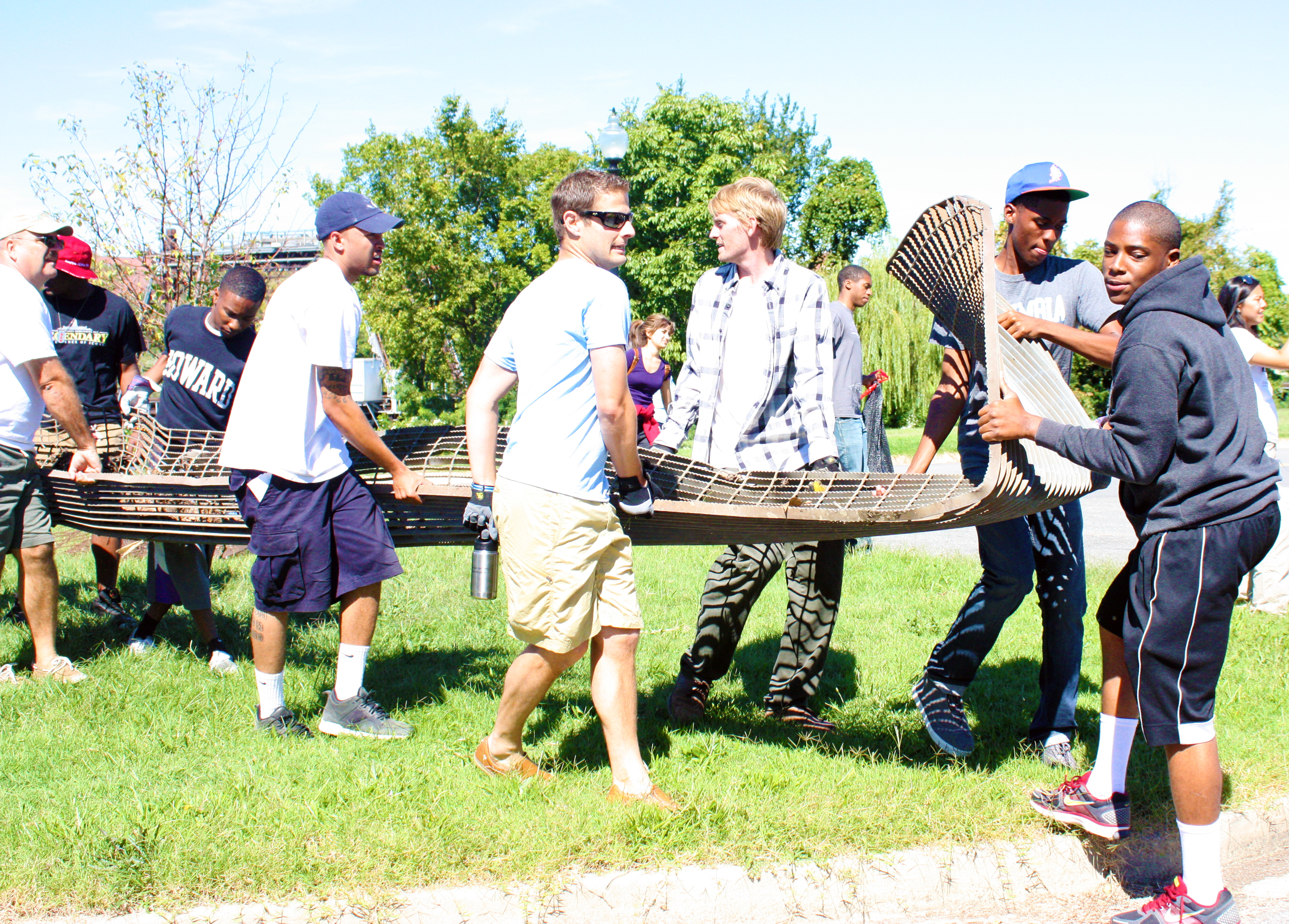
Marine debris removed during a cleanup, 2012

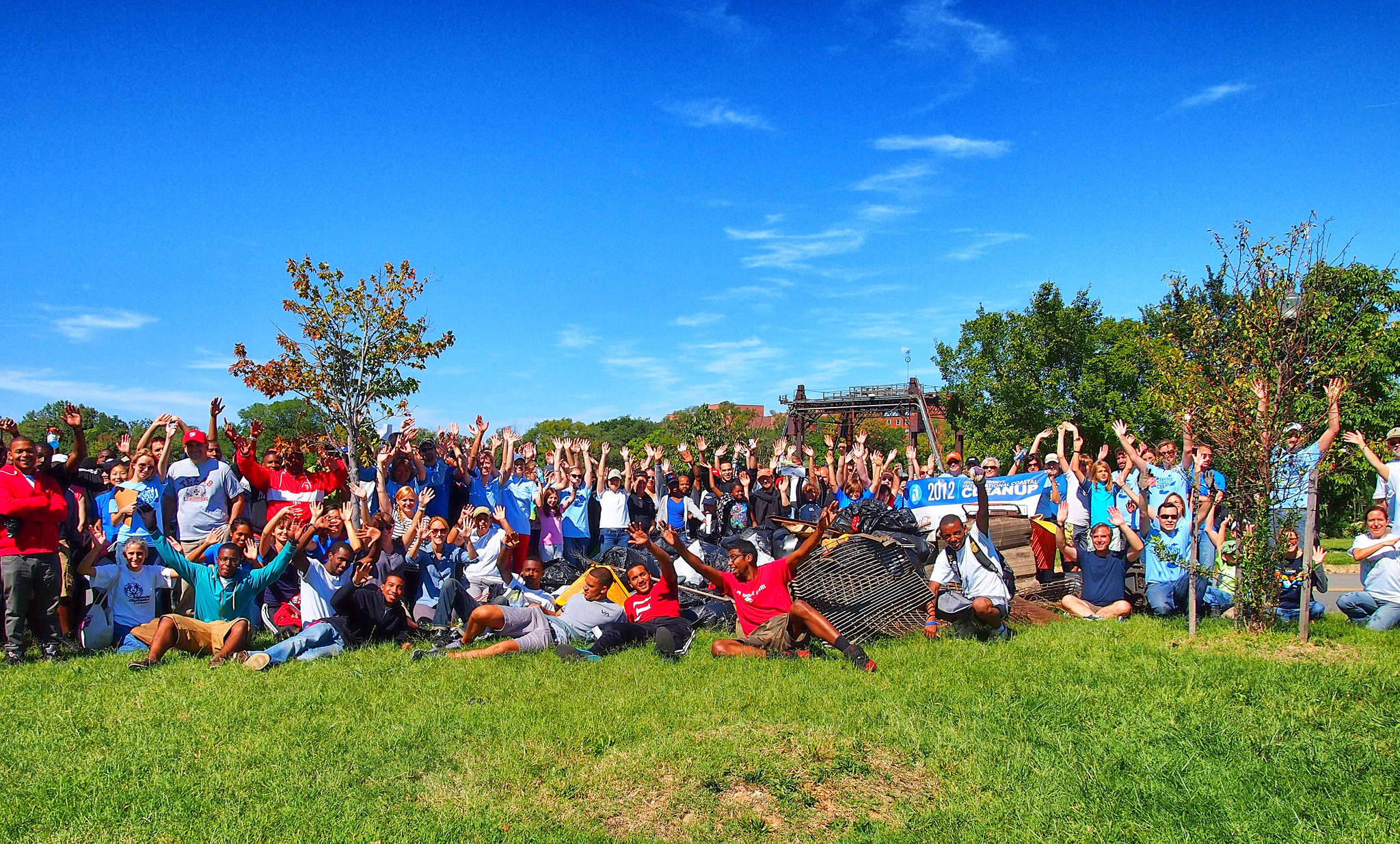
Anacostia River cleanup in Washington, D.C., 2012

== Partnerships ==
=== Alaska Chadux̂ Network (ACN) and Alaska SeaLife Center (ASLC) ===
==== Protecting Arctic Marine Wildlife From an Oil Spill ====
Over the years, vessel traffic to the northern Arctic region has drastically increased as the ice recedes and shipping channels remain ice-free for longer periods throughout the year. This increased vessel traffic creates an increased risk of spills. Alaska Chadux̂ Network (ACN) has continuously pioneered and refined solutions to reduce the risk of marine oil spills. In protecting the marine wildlife that inhabits this pristine marine and coastal ecosystem from a potential vessel oil spill, Ocean Conservancy, ACN and Alaska SeaLife Center (ASLC) have recently established an agreement to implement a program that would respond to an oil spill impacting marine mammals—like sea otters, seals and sea lions—throughout Western Alaska, the U.S. Arctic and Prince William Sound. The Agreement includes funding from ACN, an Alaska-based oil spill response organization, so ASLC can further develop oiled marine mammal response protocols and acquire specialized response resources. In addition, the new program involves opportunities to train, exercise and drill with ACN responders, including ACN partners in local communities, and to support remote ASLC specialized veterinarians and technicians in the oil spill response environment.

Along with ACN partnering with the Alaska SeaLife Center, ACN also has a long-standing partnership with International Bird Rescue (IBR). IBR assisted ACN in developing a response trailer designed for rapid mobilization and care of injured birds and small mammals. Like ASLC, IBR also provides bird care professionals and support equipment to assist in the rehabilitation of oiled wildlife.

=== National Oceanic and Atmospheric Administration ===
==== Coral reef protection and Marine Sanctuaries programs ====
The Ocean Conservancy is attempting to restore coral reefs through coral tree nurseries and research as part of the Recovery Plan with the NOAA. The coral is very sensitive to changes in water temperature and quality caused by global warming, and many times these changes result in reef disease and death. The organization informs the public of the problems plaguing reefs and other marine ecosystems through its website and magazine. A staff of senior scientists and policy experts urge policymakers to encourage implementing policies regarding mitigation, adaptation, and alternatives to damaging activities such as using carbon-based fuels.

=== Trash Free Seas Alliance (2012) ===
The Trash Free Seas Alliance was established by the Ocean Conservancy in 2012, with the participation of significant enterprises such as The Coca-Cola Company, PepsiCo, and Amcor, as well as non-profit organizations like the World Wildlife Fund and the Project AWARE Foundation. The primary objective of the alliance is to combat marine litter via scientific investigation, policy advocacy, and public outreach. The main focus of the alliance was to pinpoint the causes and effects of marine debris, devise effective solutions, and advocate for policies that decrease plastic waste and prevent its release into the ocean.

In 1988, a database on marine debris was created and divided between two main offices located in Washington, D.C., and San Francisco. The aim was to provide essential information on marine plastics to scientists, policymakers, teachers, students, and the general public. As a result of this alliance, the California Marine Debris Action Plan has been in effect since 1994 and is a comprehensive approach to addressing marine debris. The Oceans Act was also signed into law by President Clinton in 2000, establishing an Oceans Commission to review and update policies related to ocean and coastal protection.

== Legislative victories ==
- In 1996, a congressional rewrite of the Magnuson–Stevens Fishery Conservation and Management Act .
- In 2020, federal legislation passed of the Save Our Seas Act 2.0, which allocates funds to support marine debris prevention partnering with the NOAA.
- In 2022 – In June, California passed SB54, also known as the Plastic Pollution Producer Responsibility Act. This act limited the use of single-use plastic by 25%.

== Notable achievements ==
- In 2020 the organization became the first national ocean partner for a Super Bowl, which resulted in the elimination of 2.7 million single-use plastic cups (replaced with sustainable aluminium cups).
- In 2022, Ocean Conservancy joined representatives from around the world at COP27, to recommit to limit global warming and climate change.
- Ocean Conservancy has removed more than 400 million pounds of plastic and other trash from the oceans, as of April 2026.

== Awards ==
- Platinum Seal of Transparency from GuideStar.
- Top-rated environmental non-profit by Charity Navigator in 2021.

== Criticism ==
- In 2015, a group of over 200 environmental leaders and organizations sent an open letter and a technical critique of the Ocean Conservancy's "Stemming the Tide" report, also released in 2015. The criticism from The Global Alliance for Incinerator Alternatives (GAIA) centered on the organization's advocacy for incineration of plastic waste, which the letter writes can cause harmful effects, the damaging cost waste would have on the Asian cities that the report proposed to store waste nearby, and the acceptance of the necessity of plastics.
- In July 2022, the Ocean Conservancy issued a formal apology, addressing their shortcomings and acknowledging their failure to address the causes of plastic waste, consider the impact on affected communities, or for the promotion of a circular economy.

== See also ==
- Sustainability
- Biodiversity
- Global warming
- Ecology
- Conservation movement
