= Wild Burma: Nature's Lost Kingdom =

Television series

- Genre: Factual
- Presented by: Gordon Buchanan; Ross Piper; Justine Evans
- Narrated by: Paterson Joseph
- Composer: Jonathan Gunton
- Country of origin: United Kingdom
- Original language: English
- No. of series: 1
- No. of episodes: 3 (list of episodes)

Production
- Executive producers: Tim Scoones; Tim Martin
- Producer: Susanna Handslip
- Production location: Myanmar
- Editor: Mark Fox
- Running time: 60 minutes
- Production companies: BBC Natural History Unit; Smithsonian Networks

Original release
- Network: BBC Two; BBC Two HD
- Release: 29 November – 13 December 2013

Wild Burma: Nature's Lost Kingdom is a British documentary television series that first broadcast on BBC Two on 29 November 2013. The three-part series explores Myanmar's forests. The filmmakers are Gordon Buchanan, Ross Piper and Justine Evans. The scientists for the series are Chris Wemmer, Darrin Lunde, Khyne U Mar, Kristofer Helgen and Nicole Edmison.

== Production ==
The series was produced by Susanna Handslip and executive produced by Tim Scoones and Tim Martin. The BBC Natural History Unit and the Smithsonian Institution scientists worked together to explore the jungle.

== Episode list ==
No.	Title	Original release date	UK viewers (millions)
1	"Episode 1"	29 November 2013	2.05
2	"Episode 2"	6 December 2013	2.08
3	"Episode 3"	13 December 2013	1.88

== Reception ==
=== Ratings ===
According to overnight viewing figures, the first episode had an 8.3% audience share, with 1.91 million viewers. The second and third episodes had audience shares of 8%.
