= Steve Backshall =

English naturalist (born 1973)

Steve Backshall MBE
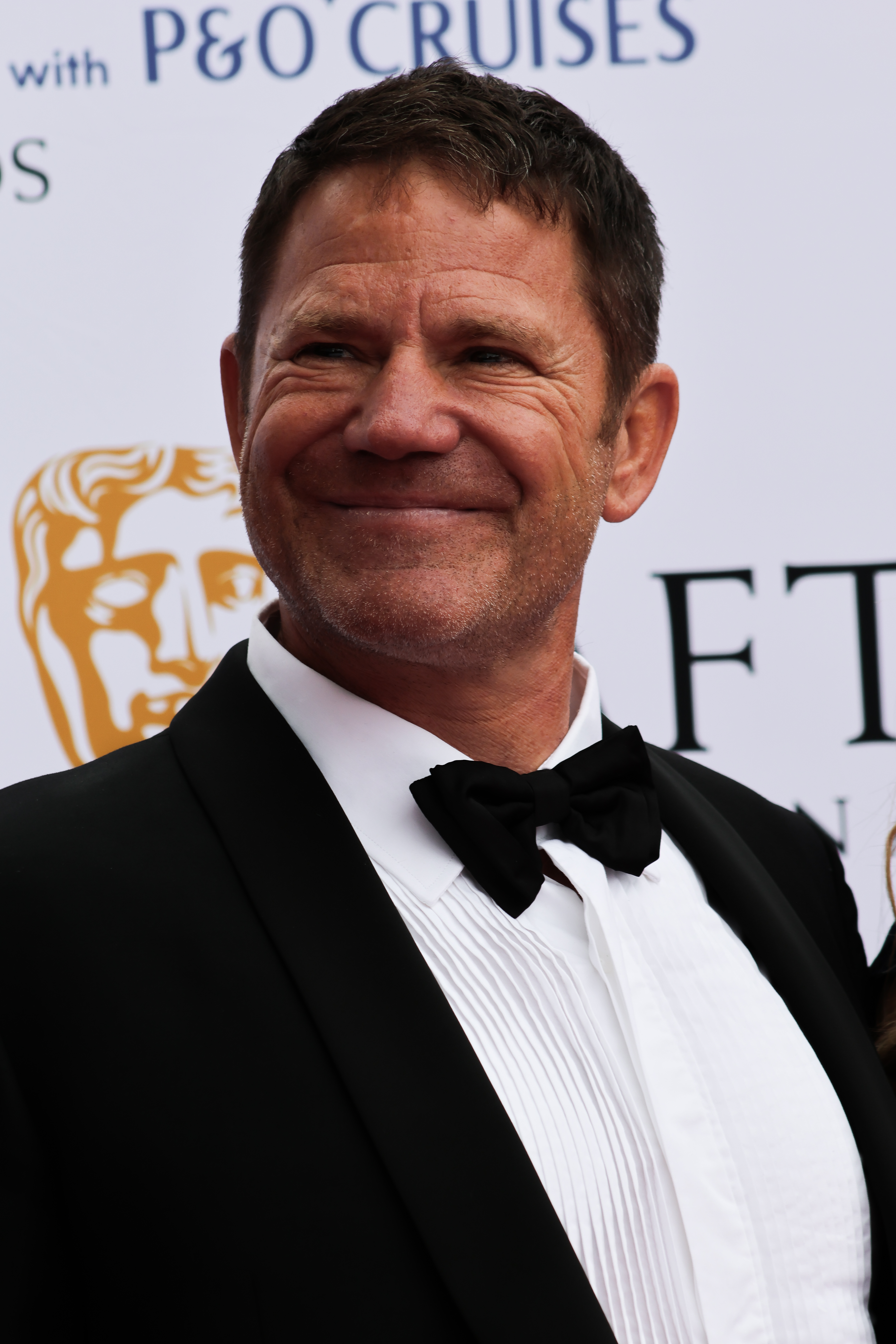
- Backshall in 2026
- Born: Stephen James Backshall; 21 April 1973 (age 53); Bagshot, Surrey, England
- Education: University of Exeter (BA); Canterbury Christ Church University (MSc)
- Occupations: Naturalist, explorer, presenter, writer
- Years active: 1996–present
- Television: Deadly... Expedition
- Political party: Green Party (since 2019)
- Spouse: Helen Glover (m. 2016)
- Children: 3
- Awards: BAFTA Awards; 2011 Children's Television Presenter; 2011 Factual Series Deadly 60; SES Explorer of the Year

Stephen James Backshall (born 21 April 1973) is an English naturalist, explorer, presenter and writer, best known for BBC TV's Deadly... franchise.

His other BBC work includes being part of the expedition teams in Lost Land of the Tiger, Lost Land of the Volcano, Deadly Dinosaurs and Lost Land of the Jaguar, as well as Expedition with Steve Backshall for the TV channel Dave. He has worked for the National Geographic Channel and the Discovery Channel. He has published a series of four novels for children called The Falcon Chronicles, three adult non-fiction works and numerous other children's non-fiction books.

== Early life ==
Backshall's parents worked for British Airways, and he was brought up in a smallholding in Bagshot surrounded by rescue animals.

Backshall attended Collingwood College in Camberley and Brooklands College, Surrey, in the sixth form. He backpacked solo around Asia, India and Africa. After this, he studied English and theatre studies at the University of Exeter. In 2020, he received his MSc degree in bioscience from Canterbury Christ Church University.

== Career ==
=== Television ===
==== National Geographic TV ====
In 1997, Backshall attempted to walk solo across the western half of New Guinea, then known as Irian Jaya; he was in the rainforest for three months, but was ultimately unsuccessful. He then had an idea for a series, bought a video camera, and went to the jungles of Colombia, where he made a pilot which he sold to the National Geographic Channel, which employed him in 1998 as its "Adventurer in Residence" and he spent five years as a producer and presenter. For National Geographic International, Backshall presented the expedition series Game for It and the environmental series EarthPulse.

On A Walk in The Desert, he walked across Israel's Negev Desert. For Bootcamp, he completed the Israeli special forces selection course, running 60 miles overnight to gain their red beret. Cracking the Canyon was nominated for Best Adventure Film at the Banff Mountain Film Festival.

==== BBC TV ====
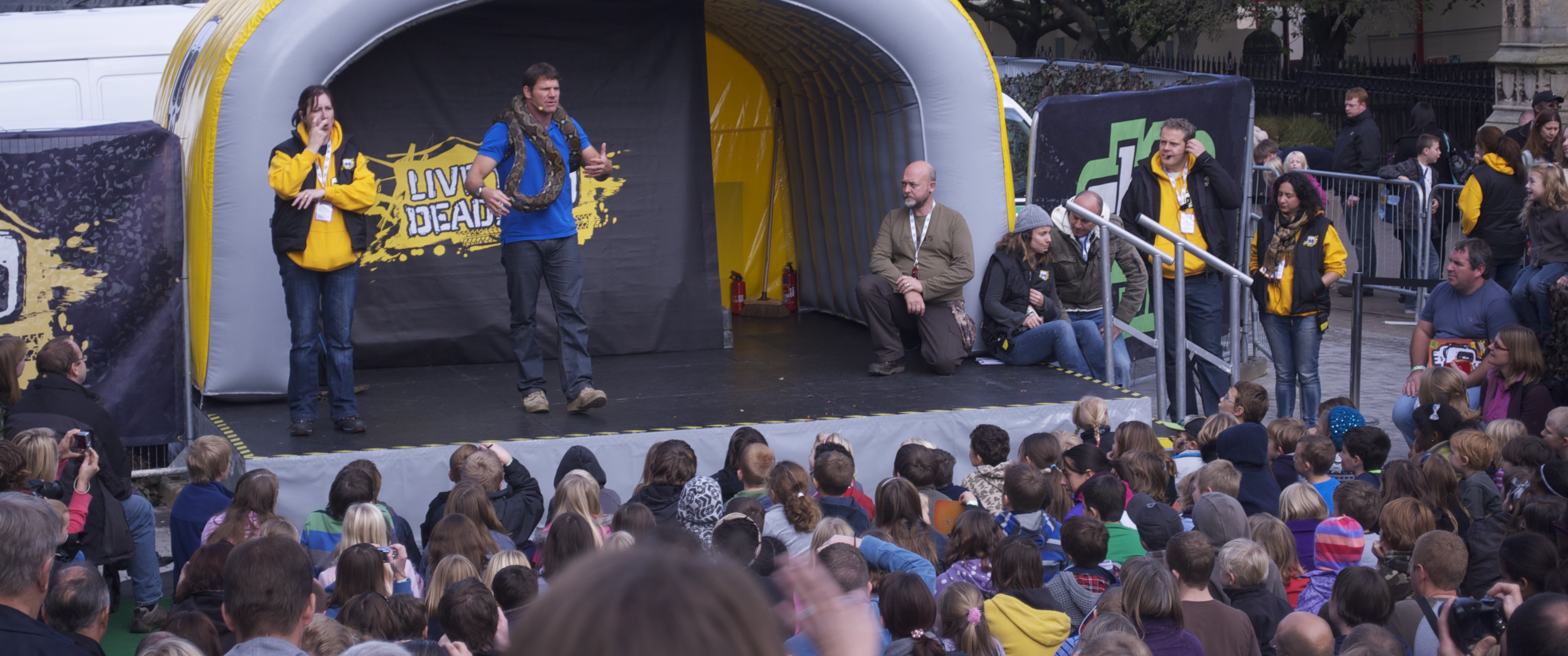
Backshall presenting a CBBC live show in 2010

In 2003, he moved to BBC's The Really Wild Show. In his first series, he travelled up Australia's east coast from Tasmania to Cape Tribulation. In the next series, he travelled around Central America, the Galapagos Islands, and then Southern Africa for the final series in 2006. He competed with fellow naturalist Nick Baker in a series of wildlife challenges. After four years, The Really Wild Show was axed so he joined the BBC Natural History Unit's expedition team.

In Expedition Borneo, the team went in search of new species. With other cavers, he made the first exploration of the passages below the mighty "Solo" sinkhole in the Mulu mountains of Borneo, and also made the first ascent of the north side of Mount Kuli.

He co-presented Springwatch Trackers with Kirsten O'Brien, which was broadcast live from the Springwatch farm in Devon between 28 May and 15 June 2007. Teams of boys and girls were set a series of tracker challenges.

In 2008, his Deadly 60 was commissioned, followed by the Live n Deadly offshoot, the aim of which was to inspire children to get outside and interested in wildlife and adventure; his live wildlife question and answer appearances attracted up to 14,000 people per event. In the "Deadly" programmes he searched for predators that were "Not just deadly to me, but deadly in their own world". He dived outside of the cage with great white, bull, great hammerhead, mako and tiger sharks, caught king cobras, black mambas and lanceheads, had a redback spider crawl across his hand and was bitten on the leg by a caiman while searching for anaconda in an Argentine swamp. The programmes were transmitted on Nat Geo Wild, Animal Planet and BBC to 157 countries worldwide. The fourth season of the series, Deadly Pole to Pole was filmed in 2013–2014 from the Arctic Circle to Antarctica, journeying south through the Americas. The scenarios included being hunted by a polar bear while kayaking in Svalbard, filming feeding sharks and eagles (using time-slice photography), exploring flooded caves and the insides of a glacier, and catching dozens of species of snake and crocodile. He was bitten by a shark but was saved by a chain-mail shark suit. The finale was diving underneath Antarctic icebergs alongside predatory leopard seal.

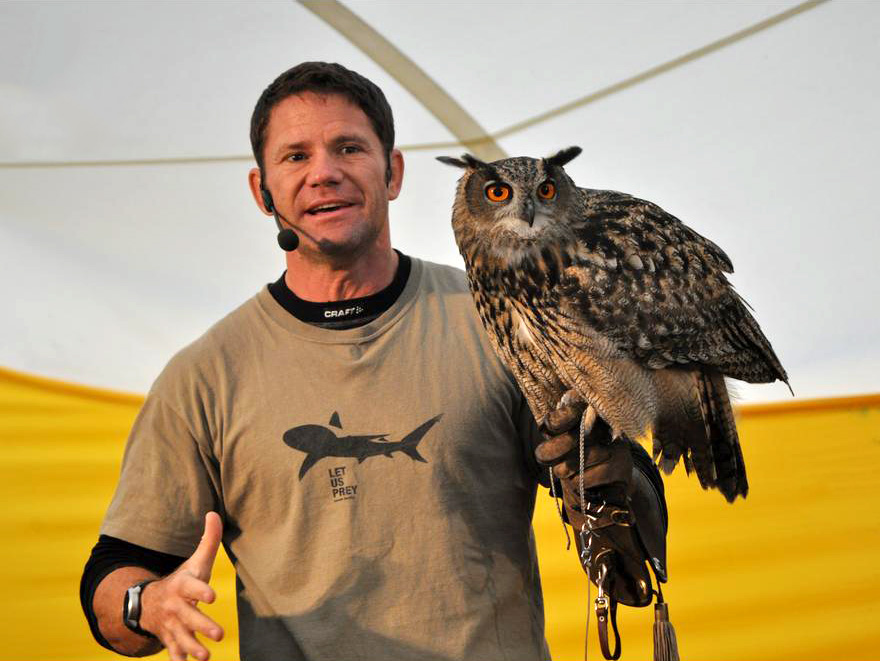
Backshall in 2011

In Lost Land of the Jaguar, he led the first expedition successfully to climb Mount Upuigma. On the summit, they discovered an endemic species of frog and mouse, and also footprints of an unidentified mammal. Lead climber John Arran named the route "Spiders in the Mist" and gave it a British grade of E7.

He filmed Ultimate Caving with Kate Humble, and Secret Wilderness Japan, and also presented nature reports for The One Show.

In Lost Land of the Volcano, he led the first western expedition into the crater of the extinct volcano Mount Bosavi in Papua New Guinea, where they discovered, among other things, one of the largest species of rats known anywhere in the world, provisionally called the Bosavi woolly rat while its scientific name is determined. They also uncovered miles of undiscovered passages in the Mageni cave system in New Britain.

In Lost Land of the Tiger, the expedition team travelled to Bhutan and filmed, via remote cameras, the Bengal tigers above the tree-line in the Himalayas, categorically higher than had ever been filmed before. Their presence at these altitudes has been previously reported from reports from India, Nepal and Bhutan.

In Supergiants, he sought to explain why species grow very large. It included diving with Nile crocodiles in Botswana, sperm whales in the Caribbean, and avoiding 2-ton elephant seals in California.

In 2013, he voiced Nature's Microworlds on BBC Four. He was a contestant on the twelfth series of Strictly Come Dancing from September 2014 on BBC One. He was partnered with former champion Ola Jordan. The couple left the series in week nine after dancing a jive to "Little Bitty Pretty One" by Frankie Lymon.

In August 2015, alongside Matt Baker and Liz Bonnin, Backshall co-presented Big Blue Live, a series of three programmes for BBC One, featuring marine life in Monterey Bay, California. The series won a BAFTA for best live series.

In 2016, the BBC aired a series called Steve Backshall's Extreme Mountain Challenge, in which the explorer attempted another first ascent by climbing one of Venezuela's remote and forbidding tepuis – sheer-sided flat-top mountains. In episode one, Backshall and his team tackle Amaurai Tepui in south Venezuela's Canaima National Park. The expedition nearly ended in tragedy when a storm hit the mountain, and rockfall nearly hit his climbing partner, Aldo Kane.

In 2017, the BBC premiered another two-part documentary following Backshall's expedition to New Guinea called Down the Mighty River with Steve Backshall. The team of whitewater kayakers attempted to make the first ever descent of the 500 mile long Baliem River in Papua, an expedition Backshall had been planning since 1997. Over the course of six weeks, they battled against some of the hardest whitewater on earth, capsizes, illness and local politics. Eventually, they made it from source to sea, although were open that they had not kayaked the entire length of the journey. A two-part series Japan's Northern Wilderness was presented by Backshall and his wife Helen Glover. A three-part series, Wild Alaska Live, co-presented by Liz Bonnin and Matt Baker, aired in July 2017.

In January 2018, Backshall participated in And They're Off! in aid of Sport Relief. Later in the year, he appeared in the first five episodes of Springwatch for 2018 and also presented an hour-long documentary, Steve Backshall vs The Monster Mountain on CBBC. In summer 2018, he presented a ten-part series titled Deadly Dinosaurs, also for CBBC.

In March 2019, Backshall, alongside Liz Bonnin and Chris Packham, presented a four-part series, Blue Planet Live, on BBC One. Backshall was seen diving live with great hammerhead sharks, tiger sharks, bull sharks and reef sharks from the shark sanctuary of Bimini.

In 2018–2019, Backshall launched the project Expedition, which was televised by BBC Two, UKTV, SBS, PBS and Discovery Asia. This involved ten expeditions to parts of the globe that had never been explored before. The team uncovered many miles of sunken cave passages in the cenotes of the Yucatan. They made the first descents of rivers in Suriname and discovered a waterfall that had no record of ever having been seen before. At more than 100 m high, it was the second highest in the nation. In Bhutan, on the first descent of the Chamkhar Chhu river, Backshall was caught in a rapid for five minutes and nearly drowned. His life was saved by rescue kayaker Sal Montgomery. They also made an ascent of Jebel Samnhan in Oman, and the first exploration of a desert canyon with a local explorer.

==== Discovery TV ====
In Venom Hunter, he travelled South America aiming to find out as much as possible about venom, including taking part in the bullet ant ritual where he was stung hundreds of times by the world's most painful stinging insect.

In Swimming with Monsters, he swam with large animals, including anaconda, hippopotamus, Humboldt squid, and great white sharks without the safety of a cage.

==== Sky TV ====
In 2006, he filmed Inside the King Cobra for Sky One.

==== Channel 5 ====
In 2017, Channel 5 aired a one-hour documentary called Meet the Hedgehogs presented by Backshall and Brian May.

=== Writing ===
Backshall began working as a writer for publisher Rough Guides, and is an author on their Indonesia guide. He continues to contribute to British newspapers.

==== Wildlife writing ====
- Venom: Poisonous Creatures in the Natural World, 2007, is a scientific analysis of venoms and poisons with an in-depth look at animals that use natural toxins.
- Deadly 60 is the book of series one, and is a diary style breakdown of each animal and how they were found and filmed.
- Wildlife Adventurer's Guide was published in 2009. It is aimed at young naturalists, and provides a guide to having adventures in the UK.
- Looking for Adventure, 2011, describes his expeditions in New Guinea; his childhood and how he got into television.
- Predators is an illustrated guide to predatory animals.
- Deadly Diaries is a diary-style book of Series 3 of Deadly 60, released in 2012.
- Deadly Detectives is a 'how to' book, teaching the skills of tracking animals by their signs, scat and prints.
- Deep Blue: My Ocean Journeys, released in 2023, is a retrospective look back at Backshall's life-long love of wildlife beneath the waves.
- Deadly: My Ultimate Lethal Beasts, released in 2025, is a wildlife book about Backshall's encounters with some of the most deadly animals.

==== Fiction ====
Backshall has stated: "I was a big reader when I was a kid ... Fiction was a massive, massive part of my formative years, far more so than television ever was, and I always hoped that my future would lie with writing. When I was given the opportunity, I absolutely leapt at it. It's an idea that I've had in mind for a long time, of these two youngsters on the run who become almost wildlife vigilantes, and it's one that I've had tremendous fun writing."

In May 2012, he published the first of a series of fiction novels titled The Falcon Chronicles.

- Tiger Wars, 2012, is about the adventures of a young boy and girl on the run from a shadowy gang of assassins, set against the background of the war on tiger poaching. In 2013, it reached the selection longlist for the Branford Boase Award for debut novels for children.
- Ghosts of the Forest, 2013, is set in the forests of Borneo and Indochina, with the same main characters battling illegal loggers.
- The Wilds of the Wolf, 2014, features the same main characters travelling to the Yamal peninsula in Siberia, tracking wolves in the snow, and battling against the big oil and gas companies that are destroying the fragile Arctic environment.
- Shark Seas, 2016, takes place in the vast pacific ocean set right after The Wilds of the Wolf where the adventures of Sinter and Saker – particularly Sinter’s new found passion of sea life conservation and Saker’s ongoing battle against The Clan and his former brothers comes to an end.

Backshall stated: "First and foremost I hope that the reader will be entertained," but added, "I hope that some of the readers – and if it's a very small percentage that's fine – will come away and want to learn more and will want to go out and find out for themselves what they can do."

== Rock climbing and other sports ==
Backshall is a rock climber and mountaineer, and does adventure races, fell runs and endurance sports.

In 2014, he summited the highly technical granite Mount Asgard in Arctic Baffin Island, in one single 27-hour summit push. Ice and alpine climbing are described as being among his great passions, and he has climbed such peaks as Cho Oyu, the sixth highest mountain in the world at 8201 m, and Cholatse in the Himalayan Khumbu. He qualified as an advanced Himalayan Expedition leader from India's Nehru Institute of Mountaineering. He partnered John Arran and Ivan Calderon up the first ascent of Upuigma-tepui in Venezuela, and led the first ascent of the North face of Mount Kuli in Borneo.

In 2005, he ran the Marathon des Sables 243 km across the Sahara desert to raise money for the Wolftrust.

Backshall has a black belt in judo, attained after a year living in Japan studying the martial art.

He is an experienced BCU four-star sea and whitewater canoeist and has three times completed the 125-mile, 24-hour, canoe race from Devizes to Westminster on the River Thames. He has competed in numerous triathlons, adventure races and fell running events. His best finishes include winning the "Extreme" and "Last Man Standing" events at UK Tough Guy, finishing 9th overall at Tough Guy and 4th in the Welsh 1000m peak marathon.

In July 2008, while attempting to climb a wet cliff face in the Wye Valley in the Forest of Dean, he fell 10 metres (33 ft) onto rocks. The impact sent his heel bone through the bottom of his foot, dislocated his ankle, and fractured two vertebrae in his back. He required twelve operations and several years of rehab to get back to fitness.

== Honours and awards ==
In 2011, Backshall won two BAFTAs: best Children's Television Presenter, and Best Factual series.

In 2009 and 2013, he was nominated for a BAFTA for Best Children's Television Presenter. Deadly 60 was nominated for Best Children's series. Lost Land of the Jaguar was nominated for Best Factual series.

Expedition Borneo was nominated for an Emmy in the US.

Lost Land of the Volcano won the 2012 Wildscreen award for best popular broadcast.

In 2012, Blue Peter awarded him a Gold Badge, its highest honour.

In 2012, he was awarded an honorary PhD degree from the University of Exeter.

In 2012, he was awarded the Animal Carer Badge in the Scout Birthday Badge Awards.

In 2017, Backshall and Glover were awarded Charity fundraisers of the year, after raising £360,000 for the World Land Trust. They also won the mixed category of the celebrated Devizes to Westminster kayak race.

In 2019, scientists named a species of toad after him: Osornophryne backshalli (Steve Backshall’s Andean toad).

Backshall was appointed Member of the Order of the British Empire (MBE) in the 2020 New Year Honours for services to charity and wildlife conservation.

In 2020, he was awarded the Scientific Exploration Society Explorer of the Year Award.

In July 2023, Backshall received an honorary degree from Bangor University, where he is also an honorary lecturer.

In September 2025, Backshall received an honorary doctorate from Canterbury Christ Church University for his contribution to the university, the field of naturalism, wildlife media and public life.

== Charities ==
- President (one of nine) – Better Planet Education
- President – Berks, Bucks and Oxfordshire The Wildlife Trusts
- Vice-President – Buglife – The Invertebrate Conservation Trust
- Patron – World Land Trust
- Patron – Bite-Back (shark and marine conservation)
- Patron – Exotic Pet Refuge
- Patron – Longridge UK
- Patron – Manta trust
- Patron – Shark trust
- Ambassador – The Scout Association and for the "Cubs 100" events celebrating 100 years of Cub Scouting

== Filmography ==
1998–2003

- Earthpulse – National Geographic Channel
- Game for It – National Geographic Channel
- The Toughest Race –National Geographic Channel
- Tracking the Canyon – National Geographic Channel
- Boot Camp –National Geographic Channel
- SOS: Save Our Seas – National Geographic Channel
- The Holiday Programme – National Geographic Channel
- Dive the World – National Geographic Channel
- Primary Geography – National Geographic Channel
- Adventure Diaries India – National Geographic Channel
- Adventure Diaries – National Geographic Channel
- Springwatch Trackers – BBC Two
- Inside Out
- Expedition Borneo
- The Really Wild Show
- Inside – King Cobra

2008

- Lost Land of the Jaguar
- The One Show – Natural
- Britain’s Lost World
- Outdoor Britain Extreme Caving
- Spring Watch Trackers
- Secret Wilderness Japan
- Expedition Alaska
- Venom Hunter
- Inside Out

2009

- Deadly 60
- Lost Land of the Volcano

2010

- Deadly 60 II
- Natural Born Hunters
- Lost Land of the Tiger
- Live and Deadly

2011

- Deadly 360
- Live and Deadly
- Serious Explorers: Raleigh

2012

- Deadly 60 III

2013

- Deadly Pole to Pole
- Super Giant Animals
- Swimming with Monsters

2014

- Deadly on a Mission: Pole to Pole
- Personal Expedition: Mount Asgard
- Strictly Come Dancing

2015

- Big Blue Live
- Backshall's Deadly Adventures

2016

- Fierce
- Steve Backshall's Extreme Mountain Challenge

2017

- Down the Mighty River with Steve Backshall
- Japan's Northern Wilderness
- Meet the Hedgehogs
- Wild Alaska Live
- Shark Bites

2018

- Steve Backshall vs The Monster Mountain
- Springwatch
- Deadly Dinosaurs

2019

- Blue Planet Live
- Undiscovered Worlds with Steve Backshall
- Saving Britain's Hedgehogs
- Expedition with Steve Backshall
- Animals After Dark

2020

- Deadly 60 IV
- Blue Planet Revisited
- Springwatch
- DIY Deadly

2021

- Celebrity Mastermind
- Our Wild Adventures
- Expedition with Steve Backshall II
- Shark with Steve Backshall

2022

- Our Changing Planet
- Deadly Predators

2023

- Steve and Aneeshwar Go Wild
- Deadly Mission Shark
- Whale with Steve Backshall

2024

- Taskmaster's New Year Treat
- Killer Crocs with Steve Backshall
- Monsters of the Deep: 20,000 Leagues Under the Sea

2025

- Hippo Watch with Steve Backshall
- Ice Age: Apocalypse
- The Secret Life of Bees
- Steve Backshall's Royal Arctic Challenge

== Personal life ==
On 16 September 2015, Backshall and Olympic champion rower Helen Glover announced their engagement on holiday in the Namib Desert. The couple married at Prussia Cove, Cornwall, on 10 September 2016.

In March 2018, it was announced that Backshall and Glover were expecting twins. In April, Glover stated that one of the twins had died, but that she and Backshall were "hopeful for the remaining baby to arrive this summer". On 24 July 2018, the couple announced the birth of their baby boy. On 17 January 2020, the couple announced the birth of their twins, a boy and girl. All their children's names have Cornish connections, as Glover was born in Cornwall. The family live in Land's End, Cornwall.

Backshall is conversant in Japanese and Indonesian, following time spent in both countries. In 2020, Backshall began learning Welsh and took part in the second season of the S4C programme Iaith ar Daith (transl. Language on Tour), in which he was mentored by fellow presenter Iolo Williams.
