= Sophie Darlington =

British wildlife camerawoman and producer-director

- Education: Windlesham House School
- Occupation: Photographer

Sophie Darlington (born c. 1967) is a freelance British wildlife camerawoman and producer-director who grew up in England, Ireland and Iran.

In 1986 her interest was piqued by Peter Matthiessen’s The Tree Where Man Was Born, and she visited a safari lodge just outside Tanzania’s Ngorongoro. There she met up with and was inspired by two of the BBC Natural History Unit’s cameramen.

In 1990 she met wildlife film maker Baron Hugo van Lawick in the Serengeti National Park and started working as a student camera operator. Since then she has spent some 20 years filming creatures, travelling to far-flung corners of the world.

"African Cats", a visual record of animal life in the Masai Mara National Reserve, under the direction of Alastair Fothergill and Keith Scholey, and the camerawork of Sophie Darlington and Simon Kerry, has been acclaimed as one of the best wildlife films ever produced. Making full use of technology, the crew spent two and a half years capturing scenery and animals in unprecedented detail.

== Filmography of documentaries ==
- Dynasties, Lions, 2018
- Disneynature’s Bears, Alaskan Grizzly bears, 2014
- "The Dark: Nature's Nighttime World", flooded Amazon forest to film wildlife at night, 2012
- Disneynature’s "African Cats", April 2011
- Disneynature's "The Crimson Wing: Mystery of the Flamingos", 2008
- P.B.S & Tigress Productions Ltd. "Intimate Enemies - Lion & Buffalo", 1999-2000. Winner US international film & video ‘gold camera’ award. 2001.
- Discovery Channel "The Arid Heart", 1998–9, Footage Merit Award, USA Wildlife Film Fest, Asia/Oceana Award, Japan Wildlife Festival Wildlife Prize, French Wildlife Festival, Stelvio National Park Award, Sondrio Festival, Italy.
- PBS & BBC, Natural World & Tigress Productions "Cheetah in a hot spot", Cinematography, 1997-8
- National Geographic & NCF "The Cheetah Family" Additional Cinematography, 1997
- Discovery Channel/C.B.S Special "The Lion’s Pride", Producer & Cinematographer, 1996
- Discovery Channel & NCF "The Lion’s Share", Cinematography, 1994–5. Nominated Cinematography category, Wildscreen 1996
- Partridge Films, W.N.E.T/Canal + "Born to run" Cinematography, 1994
- ABC Kane & Partridge Films "Lions, Pride of Africa" Cinematography, 1993
