= Lost Land of the Jaguar =

- Genre: Nature documentary
- Presented by: George McGavin; Steve Backshall; Justine Evans; Gordon Buchanan
- Narrated by: Alisdair Simpson
- Composer: Jonathan Gunton
- Country of origin: United Kingdom
- Original language: English
- No. of series: 1
- No. of episodes: 3

Production
- Executive producer: Tim Martin
- Production locations: Guyana, South America
- Running time: 60 minutes
- Production company: BBC Natural History Unit

Original release
- Network: BBC One; BBC HD
- Release: 30 July – 13 August 2008

Related
- Pacific Abyss (2008); Lost Land of the Volcano (2009)

Lost Land of the Jaguar is a 2008 British nature documentary series on the fauna of Guyana's rainforest. The four presenters are George McGavin, Steve Backshall, Justine Evans, and Gordon Buchanan. The series is a production of the BBC Natural History Unit, and was premiered on 30 July and ended on 13 August 2008. It has three episodes, each 58 minutes long. The series received a Science and Natural History reward from the Royal Television Society.

Guyana is a country located in South America, bordering Suriname, Brazil, and Venezuela. The country is known for its large, unspoiled rainforest, which is home to a wide range of animals, including the jaguar. The series documents the crew's journey through the rainforest, where they encounter the unique fauna of the region. BBC promoted Guyana as "the land of giants" inhabited by "the huge anaconda, the world's largest tarantula and giant otters." The series was originally named Expedition Guyana, but the title was changed to the Lost Land of the Jaguar by the BBC to appeal to a wider audience, as a reference to Arthur Conan Doyle's The Lost World.

Lost Land of the Jaguar is the second series in the BBC's "Expedition" collection, preceding Lost Land of the Volcano in 2009 and Lost Land of the Tiger in 2011, and following Expedition Borneo in 2006.

== Reception ==
Tim Walker of The Independent criticized the series for prosaic commentary and a lack of "spectacle." Walker praised the performance of the presenters, but wrote that despite the noble aims of the series in promoting rainforest conservation, "it doesn't always make for compelling television." Vicky Baker of The Guardian considered the title of the series misleading. She wrote that Guyana is not a lost land, but a "forgotten" or "ignored" one, "amazingly, considering it was known as British Guiana up until 1966." The Guardian's Gareth McLean was more positive on the series, writing that it was a "captivating series from the BBC's Natural History Unit," despite the department's funding cuts. Gerard O'Donovan of The Daily Telegraph was impressed by the series, stating that it was "eye-popping, absorbing and at times even a little scary, this is wildlife film-making at its very best."

== See also ==
- Jaguar
