= Monkey Planet (TV series) =

- Presented by: George McGavin
- Theme music composer: Adelphoi Music
- Country of origin: United Kingdom
- Original language: English
- No. of series: 1
- No. of episodes: 3 (list of episodes)

Production
- Executive producer: Chris Cole
- Producer: Jo Shinner
- Running time: 60 minutes
- Production companies: BBC Natural History Unit; Animal Planet

Original release
- Network: BBC One; BBC One HD
- Release: 2 April – 16 April 2014

Monkey Planet is a British documentary television series that was first broadcast on BBC One on 2 April 2014. Presented by George McGavin, the series was produced by the BBC Natural History Unit and Animal Planet.

== Production ==
The BBC announced the television series on 16 January 2014. The three-part series shows primate family success and was filmed across the globe. Filming took place in South Africa, Uganda, Ethiopia, the Congo, Thailand and Japan. The executive producer is Chris Cole and the producer is Jo Shinner.

== Episodes ==
No.	Title	Original release date	UK viewers (millions)
1	"Meet the Family"	2 April 2014	3.36
The theme of the opening episode is the diversity of the primates. In Borneo, George McGavin meets one of the largest members of the group, the orangutan, and one of the smallest, the carnivorous tarsier. Japanese macaques, the most northerly primates, are filmed huddling together at night to share body warmth and combat the sub-zero temperatures. At the southern end of the group's range, chacma baboons in South Africa evade predators by sleeping in caves. Primates originated in the rainforest canopy, still the favoured habitat of many species in the group. Gibbons are true arboreal specialists, having ball-and-socket joints in their wrists which give them great speed and agility. In Thailand, a lar gibbon family is shown being reintroduced into the wild. The programme explores primate diets, from grass-eating geladas to sap-collecting pygmy marmosets. A thermal camera films a captive aye-aye extracting an insect larva using its specially elongated middle finger, and olive baboons are shown hunting flamingos at Kenya's Lake Bogoria. Primates have become successful by being adaptable and social animals. McGavin demonstrates the group vocalisations of black howlers and the visual displays of mandrills. The final scenes show how rhesus macaques have colonised urban environments through teamwork and intelligence.
2	"Family Matters"	9 April 2014	2.7
The second programme looks at social behaviour in primates, and is introduced by McGavin from a bonobo sanctuary in the Democratic Republic of Congo. He describes the advantages of living in groups. The orange babies of Malaysia's silvery lutungs make it easier for the group to look after them. Emperor tamarins share parenting duties and vervet monkeys use series of specific warning calls to evade predators. McGavin also visits a lemur sanctuary and interacts with a female sifaka and her baby. Teamwork also enables primates such as chimpanzees to hunt. Primate societies are complex and rely on order being maintained, which can disadvantage some individuals. To illustrate this, McGavin shows how Japanese macaques low in the social order are ostracised from a hot spring. To improve their social status, most primates groom, but other tactics are sometimes employed. Spider monkeys hug one another, Barbary macaques snatch babies and take them to the dominant male and geladas chatter. Male hamadryas baboons maintain order through violence. Other primates use visual and aural displays to indicate dominance, none stranger than the proboscis monkey's elongated nose. Ring-tailed lemurs live in matriarchal societies but conflict is sometimes unavoidable, especially when food is scarce. Bonobos use sex as a way of dissipating tension and avoiding conflict, and this, says McGavin, is something we humans could learn from.
3	"Master Minds"	16 April 2014	TBA
McGavin travels to a Thai temple where the resident long-tailed macaques use human hair as dental floss. He cites this as a sign of primate intelligence, showing that they can manipulate their environments to their advantage. Other examples include Zanzibar red colobus stealing charcoal to nullify toxins in their diet, capuchins covering themselves with sap to ward off mosquitoes and macaques using stones to open shellfish. The ability to learn is another characteristic of primates. Apes have long childhoods to learn the skills they need from their elders. In Sumatra, McGavin encounters orphaned orangutans being trained for return to the wild. In Uganda, two young chimpanzees from different groups solve the same problem in different ways using knowledge passed down from previous generations, an indication of culture. Chimps are also one of the few primates that can recognise their reflections, a sign of self-awareness. Other species are shown displaying emotions, including grief and empathy. The ability to manipulate others is exemplified by a low-ranking black capuchin who deceives his group to snatch a meal. In the final sequence, McGavin meets Kanzi, a bonobo who has learned skills from humans including a basic understanding of language. Kanzi is shown building and lighting a fire and toasting marshmallows.

== Home media ==
DVD and Blu-ray Disc editions were released in the UK on 2 June 2014.
