= Alderney Wildlife Trust =

Wildlife conservation charity

The Alderney Wildlife Trust is a trust based in Alderney, Channel Islands.

The Trust works to preserve the island's biodiversity, to promote the conservation of Alderney's terrestrial and marine habitats, to encourage a sustainable Alderney, and to educate the public about the importance of the island's wildlife. The Trust helps to manage Alderney's two nature reserves at Longis and Vau du Saou. The Trust operates through a company limited by guarantee. It is administered by a committee who are directly elected by the Trust's membership.

Its headquarters is at the Alderney Wildlife Trust Office in Saint Anne, Alderney. It is part of the Wildlife Trusts partnership of 46 wildlife trusts in the British Islands, and runs the Alderney Records Centre, whose patron is Dr. George McGavin, in partnership with the Alderney Society.

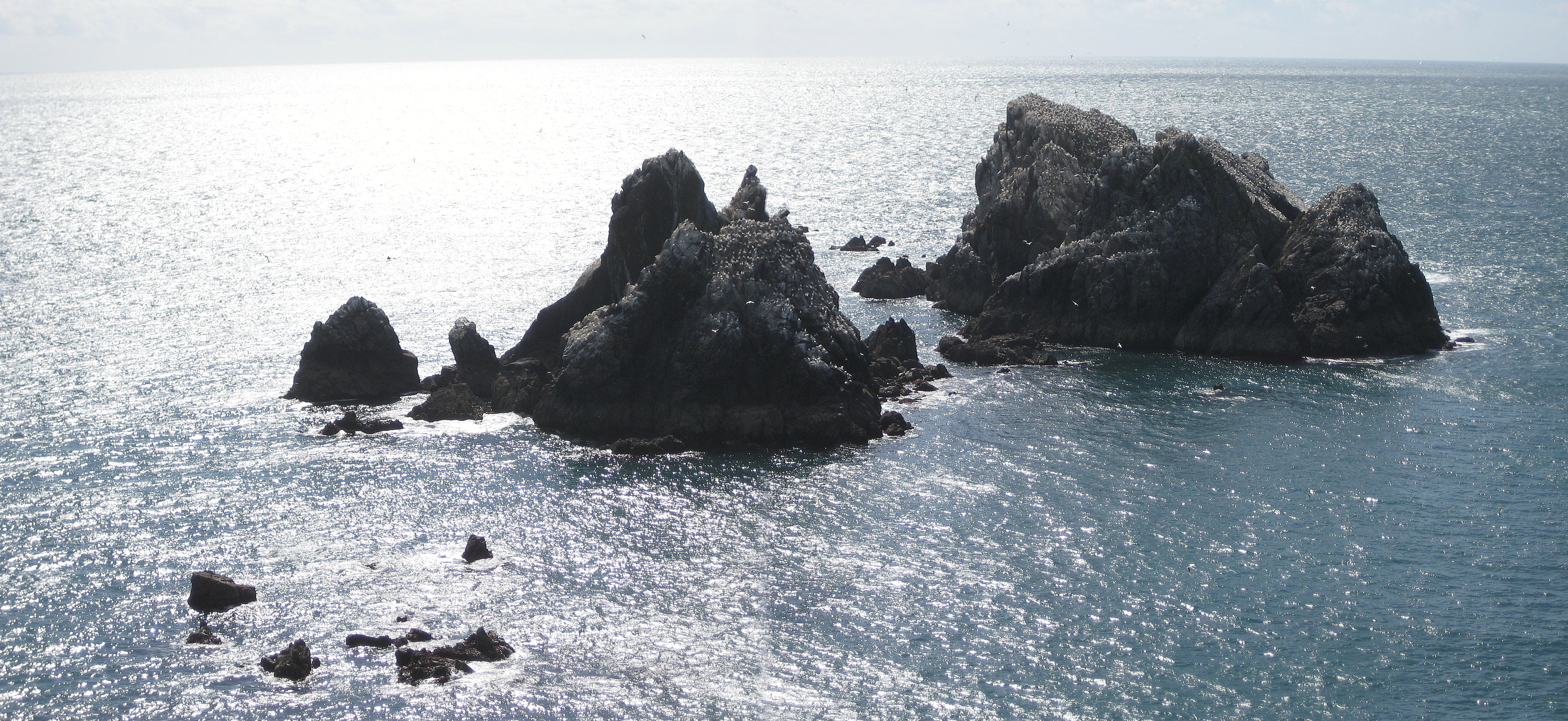
Les Étacs - Gannet colony

Alderney and its surrounding islets support a rich flora and fauna. Trees are rather scarce, as many were cut down in the 17th century to fuel the lighthouses on Alderney and the Casquets. There are notable colonies of puffins on Burhou and gannets on Les Étacs. In August 2005, the west coast of Alderney and associated islands, including Burhou and Ortac, were designated as Ramsar wetlands of international importance.

The Blonde hedgehog is a species native to Alderney. All the hedgehogs were eaten by hungry prisoners during the German occupation in World War II. Following the war four were re-introduced to control garden pests, one of which had pale pigmentation, which has give rise to one-in-four of the population being 'blonde'.
