= Bosavi woolly rat =

Scientific classification
- Kingdom: Animalia
- Phylum: Chordata
- Class: Mammalia
- Infraclass: Placentalia
- Order: Rodentia
- Family: Muridae
- Genus: Mallomys (?)
- Species: M.? sp.

Binomial name
- Mallomys? sp.

Species of rodent

The Bosavi woolly rat (Note: The name "Bosavi woolly rat" is still provisional, meaning it is an informal name, and an official scientific name is yet to be given.) is an undescribed putative species of rodent. It was discovered in the extinct volcanic crater of Mount Bosavi in Papua New Guinea during 2009 by a documentary crew filming Lost Land of the Volcano, which follows an expedition team that travels to the crater. It is believed to belong to the genus Mallomys of the family Muridae, according to initial investigation, and may be one of the world's largest rats.

== History ==
In 2009, a group of cameramen, trackers from the Kasua tribe, and biologists were in Mount Bosavi's extinct volcanic crater, over 1,000 metres (3,300 ft) above sea level, to film Lost Land of the Volcano, a wildlife documentary for BBC. The crater had rarely been explored by humans before then. While attempting to search for new species, the crew captured footage of the rodent using infrared camera, and suspected that the species had not been discovered before. They could not confirm the discovery until they witnessed the animal physically, so the trackers traveling with the crew trapped a live specimen. The rat was one of over 30 animal species that the researchers found in the crater.

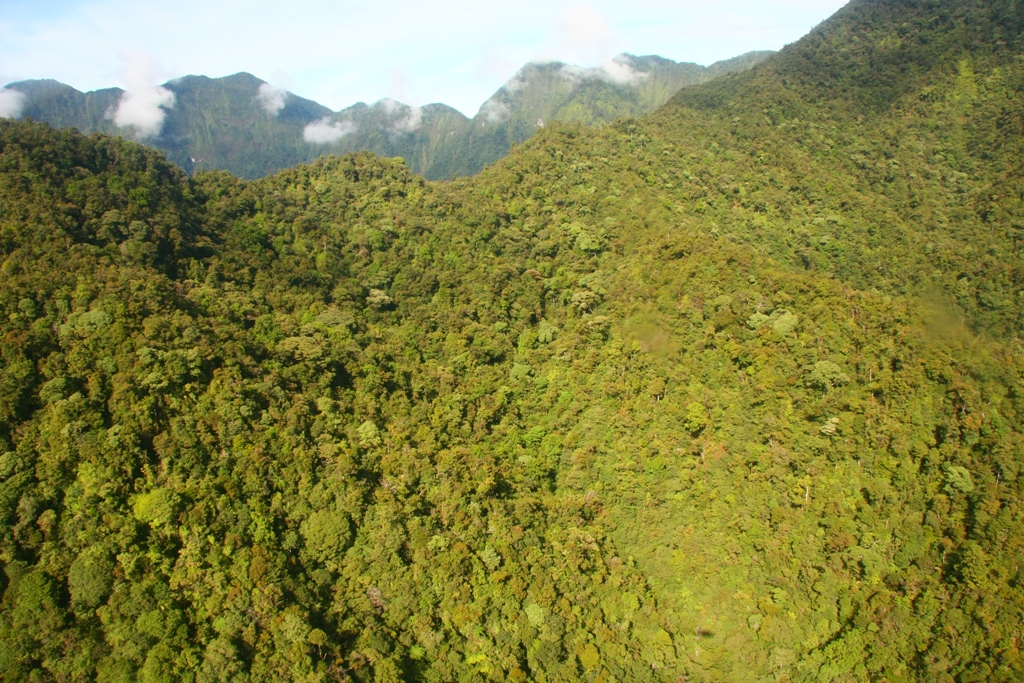
The rim of Mount Bosavi's extinct volcanic crater, where the Bosavi woolly rat is found.

The Bosavi woolly rat does not have an official scientific name. It is thought to be in the genus Mallomys, within the family Muridae.

The rat is the subject of a 2022 children's picture book by Lara Hawthorne titled Ratty's Big Adventure.

== Description ==
The Bosavi woolly rat has a length of 82 centimetres (32 in) including its tail, which may make it one of the world's largest rats. The rodent weighs around 1.5 kilograms (3.3 lb) and has a silver-brown coat of long, thick, coarse fur, which protects it from the low temperatures and moisture that appears during the crater's winter. A captured specimen was docile and showed no fear of humans when it was handled as it had not experienced them before, and simply ignored the crew to eat a leaf instead. Gordon Buchanan, the first member of the crew to discover the rat, said that its teeth suggested it was vegetarian, a claim supported by Kristofer Helgen, a mammalogist from Washington D.C.'s Smithsonian Institution, who was a member of the crew that found the woolly rat. Buchanan also speculated that it nested in trees or burrowed underground.

The rat is native to Papua New Guinea and currently has only been found inside Mt. Bosavi's crater. Deforestation near the crater could endanger its habitat.

== See also ==
- Rodents discovered in the 2000s
