= Bite-Back =

UK-based charity

Bite-Back Shark & Marine Conservation
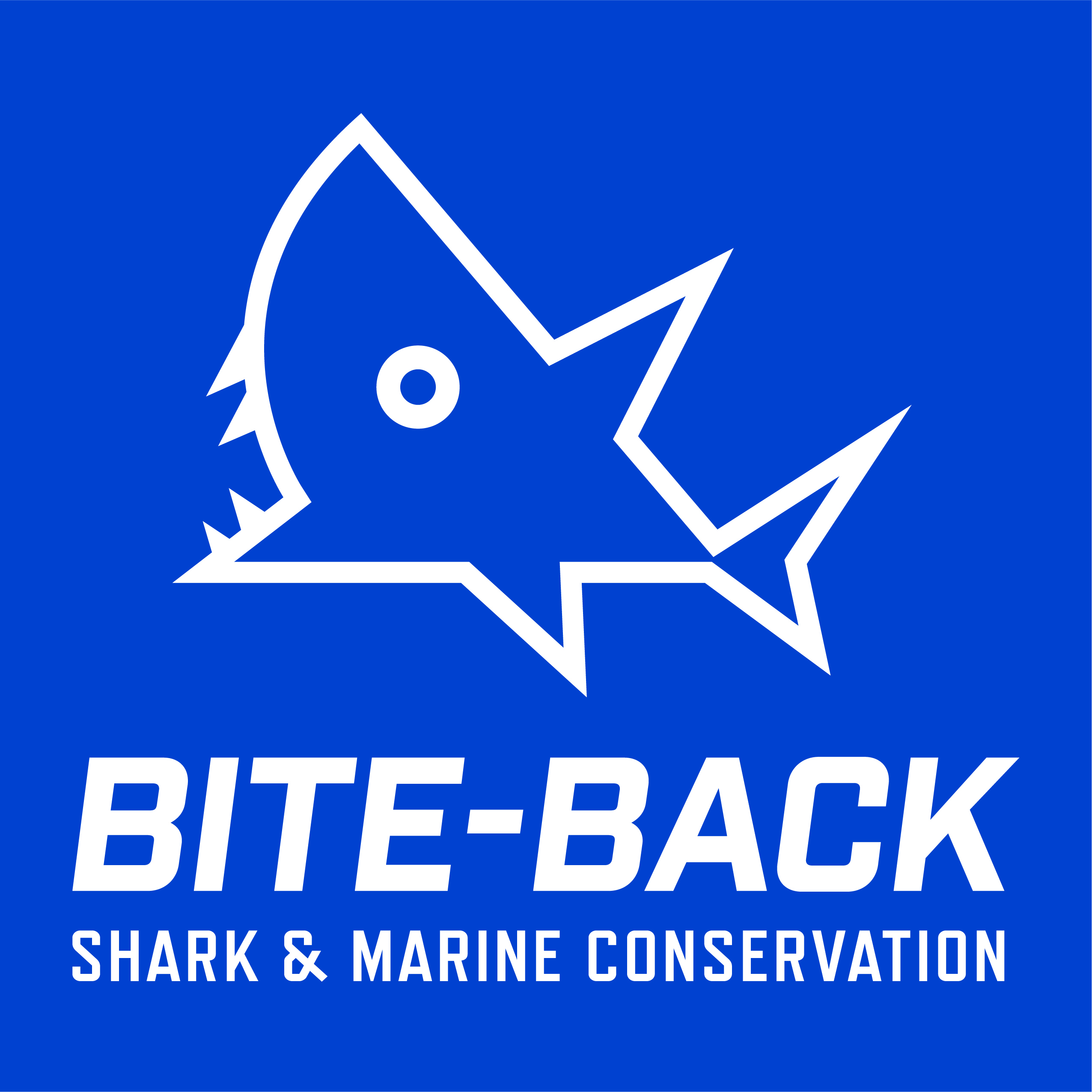
- Founded: 2004
- Registration no.: Charity No. 1137772
- Purpose: Marine conservation
- Location: London, UK
- Method: End the profit opportunities for shark-derived products in the UK and lower consumer and retailer demand for threatened marine life.
- Patron: Steve Backshall
- Key people: Graham Buckingham
- Website: www.bite-back.com

Bite-Back is a UK-based charity dedicated to shark and marine conservation which believes that over-fishing, coupled with the over-consumption of wild fish, are the two biggest threats facing the marine world. Through its work it seeks to educate people about the issues facing the only truly wild items stocked by supermarkets and to empower its supporters to help change the way fish is consumed. The charity's goal is to encourage retailers to put conservation before commerce.

Founded in the UK in 2004 by Graham Buckingham the charity's online campaigns have primarily focused on encouraging restaurants and retailers to stop selling endangered fish species and make Britain's retailers shark-free. Bite-Back is working to 'devalue' a dead shark by ending the profit opportunities for all shark and shark-derived products in the UK including shark fin soup, shark cartilage, shark jaws, shark teeth and oils.

== Consumer campaigns ==
=== Supermarket Protests ===
Successes from its supermarket campaign include persuading Japanese-inspired restaurant chain Wagamama to remove shark from its menu, encouraging supermarket giant Asda to take shark off its shelves across the UK and Mary Berry – British chef, food writer and judge on the Great British Bake Off – to remove a shark recipe from her cookery book.

=== Hacked Off ===
Its 'Hacked Off' campaign, which aims to halt the sale of shark fin soup in the United Kingdom, inspired the London-based Michelin-starred Chinese restaurant Hakkasan to stop selling the controversial soup. Having spearheaded efforts across the UK to reduce shark fin sales, in 2018 the charity reported that the number of British restaurants serving shark fin soup had reduced by 82%.

As part of the organisation's quest to devalue a dead shark and make the UK shark-free, Bite-Back encourages its supporters to contribute to its 'shark sightings' map, a comprehensive collection of shops, fishmongers and restaurants which still continue to sell shark products.

In 2014 it worked with one of its fundraising partners, Sea Life London Aquarium, to capitalise on the Chinese New Year to rally supporters and raise awareness of shark finning by distributing ‘mis-fortune cookies’ containing special messages focusing on the issue.

=== No Fin To Declare ===
After collaborating with The Independent's Oscar Quine to call a top London restaurant's shark fin supply into question, Bite-Back worked with Trading Standards and Westminster City Council to investigate their source. The Royal China Club was subsequently found to have been illegally importing shark fins for its £38 a bowl soup.

Having exposed a loophole in European legislation that allows anyone entering Europe to bring 20 kg (44 lb) of dried shark fins, the charity launched its No Fin To Declare campaign in April 2015. Bite-Back maintains that each 20 kg haul can make 700 bowls of shark fin soup and, at £180 per kg, be worth over £3,600, prompting restaurants to abuse personal import allowances as a 'back door' for the unregulated introduction of shark fins to the restaurant trade.

Despite the charity working with the Marine Species Conservation team at DEFRA and Green MEP Jean Lambert to change the personal import allowance, re-evaluate the legislation and vote to make it illegal to bring any shark fins into the EU, progress was slow and arduous.

Following Brexit, in 2022 a breakthrough in the campaign occurred when Christina Rees MP brought a private members bill to parliament calling for a UK ban on the import and export of all shark fins. Using materials provided by Bite-Back, Christina Rees MP worked to educate and inspire colleagues in parliament to back her bill. After three readings in the House of Commons, the private members bill transferred to the House of Lords for three further readings. In both Houses the bill attracted unanimous support from every party. And in June 2023 King Charles III signed the bill into law, making the UK the first country in Europe to impose a ban on the import and export of shark fins.

== Media activity ==
=== Mind Your Language ===
In July 2018 Bite-Back launched a campaign for responsible shark journalism, reminding media that Jaws was not a documentary and calling for the press to stop describing sharks as 'killers', 'monsters' and 'beasts'. Supported by celebrities including Hugh Fearnley-Whittingstall and Steve Backshall, the charity's "Media Guidelines" aim to help UK and international press report shark encounters more accurately and in a way that won't thwart shark conservation initiatives.

The campaign also received the support of Wendy Benchley, wife of Jaws author Peter Benchley, who worked with her husband as a marine conservation advocate to overcome the excessive fear of sharks prompted by the novel.

Bite-Back's quest to inspire responsible shark journalism inspired much debate across national radio stations, with campaign director Graham Buckingham interviewed by UK stations including Heart, LBC and on the BBC Radio 2 Breakfast Show.

=== Shocking Shark Stats ===
Research commissioned by Bite-Back in November 2017 into attitudes towards sharks and the oceans found that Brits are in love with the oceans, but not with sharks. While 83% think more should be done to protect the world's oceans, the charity found that 46% of Brits think sharks are more terrifying than spiders, snakes and rodents combined while nearly two-thirds (64%) would prefer sharks not to exist.

The survey into public perception of the apex predator highlighted the need for educational efforts to highlight the importance of sharks at a time when humans kill 73 million sharks a year. Of the three sharks easily named by the public – great white (89%), hammerhead (80%) and tiger (67%) – each have seen populations plummet by as much as 90% in some parts of the world in the past 50 years.

== Recognition ==
- In 2024 the naturalist, author and TV presenter Steve Backshall MBE described Bite-Back as 'the charity doing most for sharks in the UK'.
- In 2014 Bite-Back secured a three-year partnership deal with Sea Life London Aquarium, including funding to develop further educational and engagement programmes. As part of this, the charity was presented with a designated area at the high-profile visitor attraction to deliver its campaign messages and also celebrated its tenth anniversary in October 2014 with a VIP birthday party.
- In 2012 Bite-Back worked with the international advertising agency Ogilvy & Mather to produce a TV commercial entitled "Fin - help end the horror". Created to highlight the shark-killing practice of shark-finning, the advert was deemed too graphic for TV viewing. Receiving an 18-certificate cinema rating, the black and white ad went on to be shortlisted for a Panda award for 'best campaign film' at the Wildscreen Festival the same year.
- Bite-Back's shark fin soup campaign has received celebrity support from renowned chefs, including Gordon Ramsay and Hugh Fearnley-Whittingstall, Charles Clover, author of The End of the Line: How overfishing is changing the world and what we eat plus actor Martin Clunes.
- The charity's founder, Graham Buckingham, has spoken at two TEDx events, the first in November 2016 on "Defending Jaws" and the second in January 2018 revealing "The Terrifying Truth About Sharks"
- Its annual fundraising calendar unites some of the world's most acclaimed underwater photographers, including David Doubilet, Brian Skerry, Alex Mustard and Doug Perrine.
