= Lost Land of the Volcano =

- Series title card from UK broadcast
- Also known as: Expedition New Guinea
- Genre: Nature documentary
- Presented by: Gordon Buchanan; Steve Backshall; George McGavin
- Narrated by: Philip Glenister
- Composer: Jonathan Gunton
- Country of origin: United Kingdom
- Original language: English
- No. of series: 1
- No. of episodes: 3

Production
- Executive producer: Tim Martin
- Production location: New Guinea
- Running time: 60 minutes
- Production company: BBC Natural History Unit

Original release
- Network: BBC One; BBC HD
- Release: 8 September – 22 September 2009

Related
- Lost Land of the Jaguar (2008); Lost Land of the Tiger (2010)

Lost Land of the Volcano is a three-part nature documentary series produced by the BBC Natural History Unit which follows a scientific expedition to the island of New Guinea. The expedition team, which includes specialist zoologists, explorers and the BBC crew, travels to the extinct volcano of Mount Bosavi in central Papua New Guinea to document the biodiversity of this little-visited area and search for new species. At the time of filming, logging was taking place about 20 miles (32 km) south from the volcano, and one of expedition's aims was to find evidence to support the case to protect the area. Some members of the expedition team travelled to the island of New Britain several hundred kilometres to the east to chart an unexplored cave system and observe an active volcano.

The series was broadcast from 8 to 22 September 2009 on BBC One in the United Kingdom in a three-part run. In the United States, it was broadcast the same month in seven parts on consecutive nights.

Lost Land of the Volcano was the third of the BBC Natural History Unit's "Expedition" series, following Expedition Borneo (2006) and Lost Land of the Jaguar (2008), and followed by the Lost Land of the Tiger (2010).

== Discoveries ==
Hundreds of species were catalogued, and over 40 species or subspecies discovered during the nine-month expedition, including 16 frogs, 3 fish, a tube-nosed bat, a tree kangaroo, a cuscus (Bosavi silky cuscus), and a giant woolly rat. The rat, provisionally called the Bosavi woolly rat, is among the biggest species of rat in the world measuring 82 centimetres (32 in) in length and weighing 1.5 kilograms (3.3 lb). Papua New Guinea's rainforest is currently being destroyed at the rate of 3.5% per year, and the practice of logging about 20 miles (32 km) south from the volcano presents a potential threat to the ecosystem. One of the expedition's aims was to find evidence to support the case to protect the area.

== Episodes ==
=== One ===
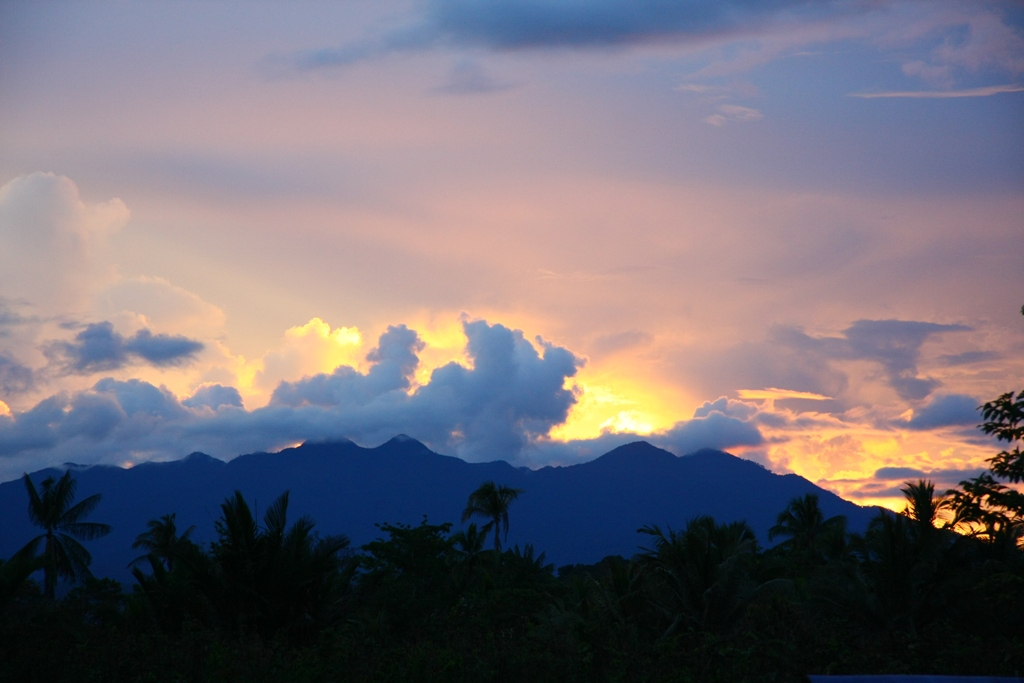
Mount Bosavi, Southern Highlands Province, Papua New Guinea

Natives of the tribe who own the forests help to make a base-camp on the outer slopes of Mount Bosavi in advance of the arrival by helicopter of film-makers and a team of experts from all over the world, including scientists from New Guinea. Dr George McGavin explains the importance of the local biodiversity and the destruction that logging is doing to local forests and wildlife, while a lorry loaded with logs is shown filmed from above. The narrator explains the geography and the isolation of the forests on the inner slopes of the huge extinct volcano. McGavin finds interesting insects including beetles, ants, and millipedes. Buchanan finds a pygmy parrot nest in a termite mound, and after a long wait in a bird hide he films a pair of buff-faced pygmy parrots by their nest. Buchanan helps to place remote cameras at suitable sites throughout the forest, and later using a laptop computer at the base-camp, he shows a cuscus recorded on a memory card from one of the remote cameras. A striped possum is found in one of the animal traps, which is released after being studied and filmed. Buchanan films a cuscus in a tree and bats eating figs at night using infrared illumination. Backshall goes to the island of New Britain to join a group of cavers.

=== Two ===
On New Britain, a small team of British and French cavers led by Dave Nixon are joined by Backshall, the only naturalist in the caving team. They map a Mageni river cave and hope to discover new caves. Backshall becomes weakened by a fever, the team recover at the base-camp, and on their return to the caves they find and chart an undiscovered cave river. On New Guinea Buchanan films a fruit-dove on a nest, Dumbacher takes blood from a king bird-of-paradise for research and reports that they have netted many more species, Allison finds more frogs, and McGavin follows a caterpillar changing into a large colourful moth using time-lapse photography. A team disturb large fruit bats from trees while boating upriver to a village of about 500 poor New Guinean natives. The medic Jane Stevenson attends to villagers including children very ill with malaria and McGavin negotiates with the village leaders. Around a night-fire the tribe show Buchanan feather headdresses and demonstrate a tribal dance wearing feather decorations from birds-of-paradise. With guides from the village Buchanan traces king birds-of-paradise and raggiana birds-of-paradise in the forest from their calls, and films their courtship behaviours.

=== Three ===
On New Guinea, two teams are formed, one of which goes into the Mount Bosavi caldera. The extinct volcano is filmed from the air as the helicopter takes an advance team onto its rim, where they have arranged to meet local Kosua people who will be their guides. They climb down into the volcano crater and prepare a base-camp for the rest of the team. Buchanan films a tree kangaroo, and Helgen helps to identify a wallaby, a painted ringtail possum, a new cuscus subspecies (similar to the silky cuscus), and a large new rat species provisionally named the Bosavi woolly rat.

McGavin heads the other team and goes to Tavurvur, an active volcano on New Britain. He sees a brahminy kite hunting over the grey ash-covered landscape, and finds an adult rhinoceros beetle and one of the larva in a tree stump. He sees megapode birds digging in the warm ash to bury eggs, and when they have finished he uncovers and reburies a large oval egg. He finds scavenger crabs before spectacular volcanic activity forces the team to evacuate the area. After this, McGavin goes to New Guinea and a helicopter takes him to the rim of Mount Bosavi. He reports on the dangers of climate warming and of humans to the wildlife as he watches an ornate fruit-dove. He sets up a night-light which attracts hundreds of moths, and he suspects many are not known to science. As the helicopter arrives to collect him from the summit, he wonders if the rainforest and its biodiversity will be destroyed.
