= Lost Land of the Tiger =

- Genre: Nature documentary
- Presented by: Steve Backshall; Gordon Buchanan; Justine Evans; George McGavin
- Country of origin: United Kingdom
- Original language: English
- No. of episodes: 3

Production
- Production location: Bhutan
- Running time: 60 minutes
- Production company: BBC Natural History Unit

Original release
- Network: BBC One
- Release: 21 September – 23 September 2011

Related
- Lost Land of the Volcano (2009)

Lost Land of the Tiger is a three-part nature documentary series produced by the BBC Natural History Unit which follows a scientific expedition to the Himalayan kingdom of Bhutan. The expedition team is made up of specialist zoologists, explorers and the BBC crew. Together, they explore wilderness areas from the lowland jungles to high-elevation slopes, in search of rare animals and plants. The focus of the expedition is to investigate the status of the tiger in Bhutan, where little is known of the cat's distribution or population density. Evidence of a healthy population of tigers would elevate Bhutan's importance as a sanctuary for this endangered species. It would also support tiger conservationist Dr. Alan Rabinowitz's proposal for a vast protected corridor linking the fragmented pockets of tiger habitat which lie to the south of the Himalayas.

The expedition is notable for claiming to obtain the first footage of tigers living at 4,000 metres (13,000 ft) in the high Himalayas. The BBC footage shows a female tiger lactating and scent-marking, followed a few days later by a male tiger responding, suggesting that the cats could be breeding at this elevation. Previously, anecdotal sightings from Bhutanese mountain villagers suggested tigers were capable of visiting such heights, but it was not known whether they were living and breeding there. Evidence of tigers at this altitude had in fact already been confirmed by Bhutanese scientists years prior, and the BBC has been criticized for taking credit for a "discovery" that was not in fact theirs. The footage was obtained using remote camera traps which are triggered by motion. This discovery dramatically increases the known range of viable tiger habitat. The camera traps also recorded footage of other rarely seen forest creatures, including Indian wild dogs, Asian elephants, leopards and leopard cats.

The series was broadcast on BBC One in the United Kingdom on three consecutive nights, starting on 21 September 2010. The presenters were Steve Backshall, Gordon Buchanan, Justine Evans and Dr. George McGavin.

Lost Land of the Tiger was the fourth of the BBC Natural History Unit's "Expedition" series, following Expedition Borneo (2006) and Lost Land of the Jaguar (2008) and Lost Land of the Volcano (2009).

== See also ==
- Wildlife of Bhutan
