= Ross Piper =

British zoologist, entomologist, and explorer

- Education: Bangor University, University of Leeds
- Occupations: Zoologist; Entomologist
- Website: www.rosspiper.net

Ross Piper is a British zoologist, entomologist, and explorer.

== Biography ==
Piper's fascination by animals began at a young age through early encounters with a violet ground beetle and the caterpillar of an elephant hawk moth. This early interest led to a degree in zoology from Bangor University and a PhD in insect ecology from the University of Leeds. Piper has travelled widely in Europe, the Americas, Africa and Southeast Asia, searching for interesting and elusive beasts. Although his focus is arthropods, the sheer diversity of animal forms and lifestyles is a continual source of fascination.

In 2015 he was awarded the Alumnus of the Year award by Bangor University and has since become a member of their alumni advisory board. He is also a student mentor for the University of Leeds and a Fellow of the Royal Geographical Society. He is currently a visiting research fellow at the University of Leeds and a visiting fellow at the University of Essex. His current projects include authoring additional books exploring insects as a source of novel pharmaceuticals and biomaterials and planning further expeditions.

== Science ==
Piper's interest in communicating the staggering diversity of animals beyond vertebrates led to his latest book, Animal Earth, which has so far been translated into German and Japanese. This book explores animal diversity.

In documenting the arthropod life he finds during expeditions Piper contributes to our knowledge of these areas. In addition to these two broad areas Piper is also interested in the ecology of beetles and solitary wasps, how ecology, morphology and molecular data can be integrated to reveal the true complexity of animal diversity and the interactions between arthropod assemblages and agricultural landscapes.

== Exploration ==
Piper is always keen to stress how little we know about life on Earth, which is a continuing theme in his books and talks. His own contribution to addressing this is exploration, mostly in the tropics. During his time in Myanmar Piper explored and searched for insects in areas where few if any scientists had been before. Tamanthi Wildlife Reserve was one such place. The specimens from this forest have so far yielded a new genus and several new species.

== Media ==
His work has been widely covered in the media and he has written opinion pieces for the BBC, The Conversation and Geographical. Piper is also a macrophotographer and Wikipedia editor.

== Books ==
- Extraordinary Animals: An Encyclopedia of Curious and Unusual Animals. Greenwood Publishing Group. 30 August 2007. ISBN 978-0-313-33922-6.
- Death Zone!: Can Humans Survive at 26,000 Feet?. Heinemann-Raintree Classroom. 1 January 2009. ISBN 978-1-4296-3128-0.
- Extinct animals: an encyclopedia of species that have disappeared during human history. Greenwood Press. 20 March 2009. ISBN 978-0-313-34987-4.
- Fingerprint Wizards: The Secrets of Forensic Science. Coughlan Publishing. 1 April 2009. ISBN 978-1-4296-3117-4.
- Surviving in the World's Most Extreme Places. Capstone Press. 1 January 2010. ISBN 978-1-4296-4560-7.
- Survival!: Staying Alive in the Wild. A & C Black. 5 March 2010. ISBN 978-1-4081-0091-2.
- Extreme Lunch: Life and Death in a Food Chain. A & C Black. 30 March 2010. ISBN 978-1-4081-0101-8.
- Pests: A Guide to the World's Most Maligned, Yet Misunderstood Creatures. ABC-CLIO. 3 March 2011. ISBN 978-0-313-38426-4.
- Animal Earth. London: Thames and Hudson. 2015. ISBN 9780500291658.
- What Insects Do, and Why. Princeton University Press. 2021. ISBN 9780691217697.
