= Jeffery Boswall =

Naturalist, broadcaster and educator

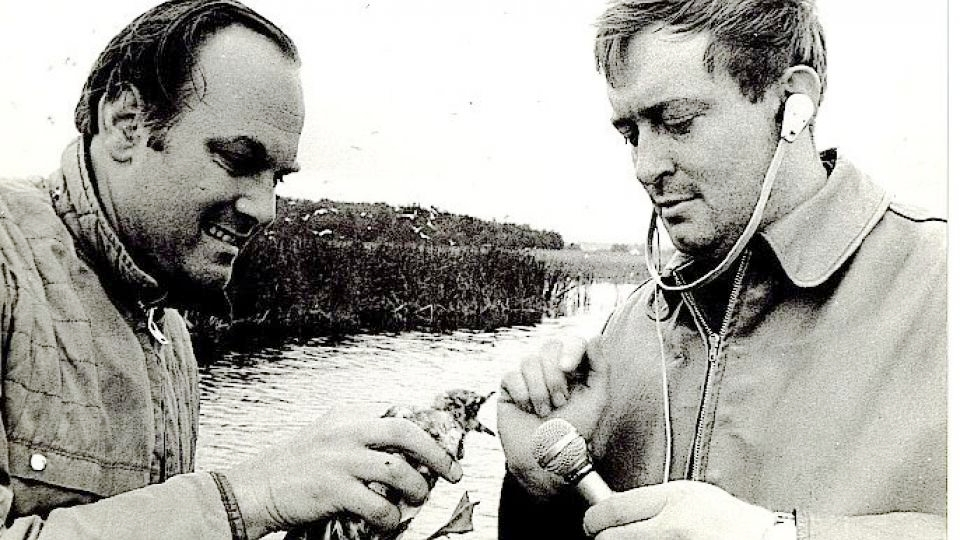
Jeffery Boswall (the left) with the Czech radio presenter Oldřich Unger in Velký a Malý Tisý nature reserve in Bohemia, Czechoslovakia, 1967

Jeffery Boswall (20 March 1931 – 15 August 2012) was a British naturalist, broadcaster and educator.

One of the longest serving producers with the BBC Natural History Unit (1957-1987), and the writer and presenter/narrator of many of the programmes he produced, he was also prominent in the development of the ethics of natural history broadcasting and the encouragement of new entrants into the field. Boswall wrote and produced the first wildlife film shown in colour on the BBC, The Private Life of the Kingfisher, filmed by Ron Eastman. It was broadcast in 1967 on BBC2. He was one of the "pioneers of British natural history broadcasting" (Daily Telegraph obituary, 5 September 2012).

== Early years ==
Jeffery Hugh Richard Boswall was born in Brighton on 20 March 1931. A keen amateur ornithologist, his first published article appeared in the journal British Birds when he was 16. His interest in ornithology arose from a chance suggestion by a friend that he join him bird watching at the River Adur near Shoreham-on-Sea. His first full-time job was as assistant to the Director of Watchers and Sanctuaries for the Royal Society for the Protection of Birds.

== BBC Natural History Unit ==
Boswall began as a radio producer, upon joining the BBC Natural History Unit in 1957, producing series including Birds of the Air and The Naturalist.

He started to work on television programmes in 1964. He produced the Look series (introduced by Peter Scott) from 1963 to 1969, which is the series which made Peter Scott a household name in Great Britain.

Boswall wrote and produced the first wildlife film shown in colour on the BBC, The Private Life of the Kingfisher, filmed by Ron Eastman and narrated by Peter Scott. It was broadcast in 1967 on BBC2. It won the Silver Medal at the Moscow Film Festival in 1967. It enormous popularity led to it being repeated an unprecedented eight times, as well as to Boswall commissioning a series of 18 programmes on single species in a series known as Private Lives, ranging from the Jackass Penguin to the Siamese Fighting Fish to the Cuckoo.

He produced and presented Wildlife Safari to Ethiopia (1970), a six-part series. It was described by Christopher Parsons, former head of the BBC's Natural History Unit, as "arguably one of the best series of its genre ever made". Boswall went on to produce and present three follow up series: Wildlife Safari to the Argentine (1972), Boswall's Wildlife Safari to Mexico (1977) and Boswall's Wildlife Safari to Thailand (1979).

He was awarded the Royal Geographical Society's Cherry Kearton Medal and Award in 1977.

He wrote, produced and narrated Animal Olympians (1980) a one-hour special which compared the feats of animals to those of human olympians, as well as celebrating superlative feats from the natural world which have no human analogue. This was broadcast in connection with the Moscow Olympics in 1980 and was for many years in the top 5 sales of BBC programmes internationally.

Other programmes he produced included Cracking the Egg (1982), The Truth behind the Turkey (1982), Natural World: Where the Parrots Speak Mandarin (1986) and Wild Waterfalls (1989)

He was series producer for Birds For All Seasons, a three-part series broadcast in 1986, narrated by Magnus Magnusson. He wrote a book to accompany this series, with David Helton.

He frequently appeared on or contributed to other radio and television programmes, including Today, Animal Magic, Nationwide, and Wogan.

== Ethics of natural history broadcasting ==
Boswall is acknowledged as one of the key figures in shaping the approach to ethics in natural history broadcasting. He is credited with establishing two main commandments "Thou shalt not deceive the audience" and "thou shalt not harm nature".

On the latter topic he was quoted in Discover magazine in 1985:

When I lecture about this issue, I ask this question: Who would shrink from introducing a living fly into a spider's web to get a shot of the spider feeding on the fly. Usually no one objects to that. Then I carry the same question through the animal kingdom, up to using a monkey as a bait for a boa constrictor. Not many people like that too much. Then I ask - supposing of course that adequate provisions were made for his family - how would you feel about feeding a human to a crocodile? Crocodiles do feed on humans, you know, so it would be scientifically correct (original emphasis).

== The profession of natural history broadcasting ==
Boswall chaired the first six BKSTS International Symposia for Wildlife Filmmakers from 1976 to 1991, being the main forum in the UK for wildlife filmmakers to meet and debate current issues in the profession. Keynote speakers included David Puttnam and Hugh Falkus. This event was merged with Wildscreen from 1994.

In 1992 he became Senior Lecturer in Wildlife Film-making at the University of Derby, probably the first full-time position of its kind in the world. Boswall has taught courses in the UK and internationally on natural history film-making. He appeared on the jury at a number of international wildlife film festivals.

Boswall's overall contribution to natural history broadcasting has been recognised by awards from the Royal Geographical Society and the British Kinematograph Sound and Television Society.

== Wildlife sound recording ==
In addition to owning one of the largest privately held collections of commercially issued bird voice gramophone records and tapes, Boswall published numerous discographies including sound production by birds, mammals, insects and amphibians.

He was joint author of The Peterson Field Guide to the Bird Songs of Britain and Europe and co-founder of the British Library of Wildlife Sounds collection now at the British Library Sound Archive in London.

== Other work ==
After leaving the BBC in 1987 he became Head of Film and Video at the Royal Society for the Protection of Birds, producing a variety of programmes including Mud Matters (1988), Eagles - the Majestic Hunters (1990) and Flying for Gold (1992).

Throughout his career he has given frequent public lectures on a variety of natural history topics, including bird song and tool using by birds. He has also led courses since 1988 aimed at those seeking to enter natural history television as a career on how to make wildlife documentaries.

From the 1980s, Boswall was involved in the vanguard of the emerging trend towards eco-tourism, and has led wildlife tours to places as varied as the Galápagos Islands, Ethiopia, Russia and China.

Boswall wrote over 100 articles in scientific journals on natural history subjects. He wrote the annual update on global ornithology for Encyclopædia Britannica Yearbook from 1964 to 1998.

== Bibliography ==
- Jeffery Boswall, editor. Private Lives: Studies of Birds and Other Animals from the BBC TV Series Look and Private Lives, BBC Books, 1970. ISBN 978-0-563-08591-1.
- Jeffery Boswall. The language of birds, Proceedings of the Royal Institution Vol 55 pp. 240–303 among many other scientific articles. https://www.bl.uk/the-language-of-birds
- Jeffery Boswall. Birds for All Seasons, BBC Books, 1986. ISBN 978-0-563-20453-4.
- Copeland, Peter, Jeffery Boswall, and Leonard Petts. Birdsongs on Old Records. London: the authors in association with the British Library of Wildlife Sounds, 1987. ISBN 0-900208-06-6.
- Piers Warren, foreword by Jeffery Boswall. Careers in Wildlife Filmmaking. Wildeye, 2006. ISBN 978-0-9541899-3-8
