= ARKive =

Repository of media of endangered species

ARKive – Images of Life on Earth
- Website type: Encyclopaedia
- Successor: Wildscreen ARK
- Creator: Wildscreen
- Launched: 20 May 2003
- Current status: Archived

Wildscreen ARK
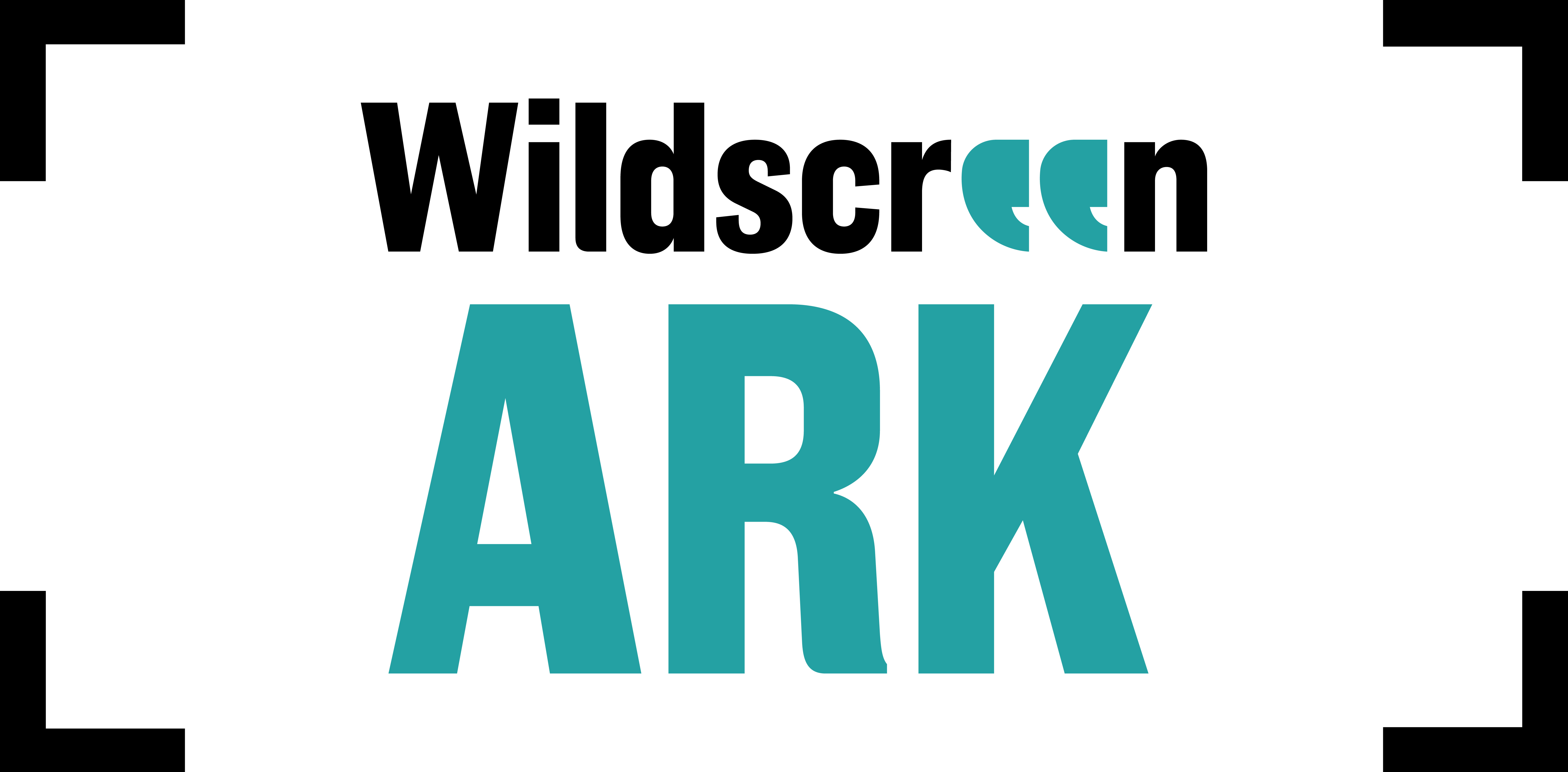
- Former name: ARKive
- Creator: Wildscreen
- Website: wildscreenark.org
- Launched: February 2024

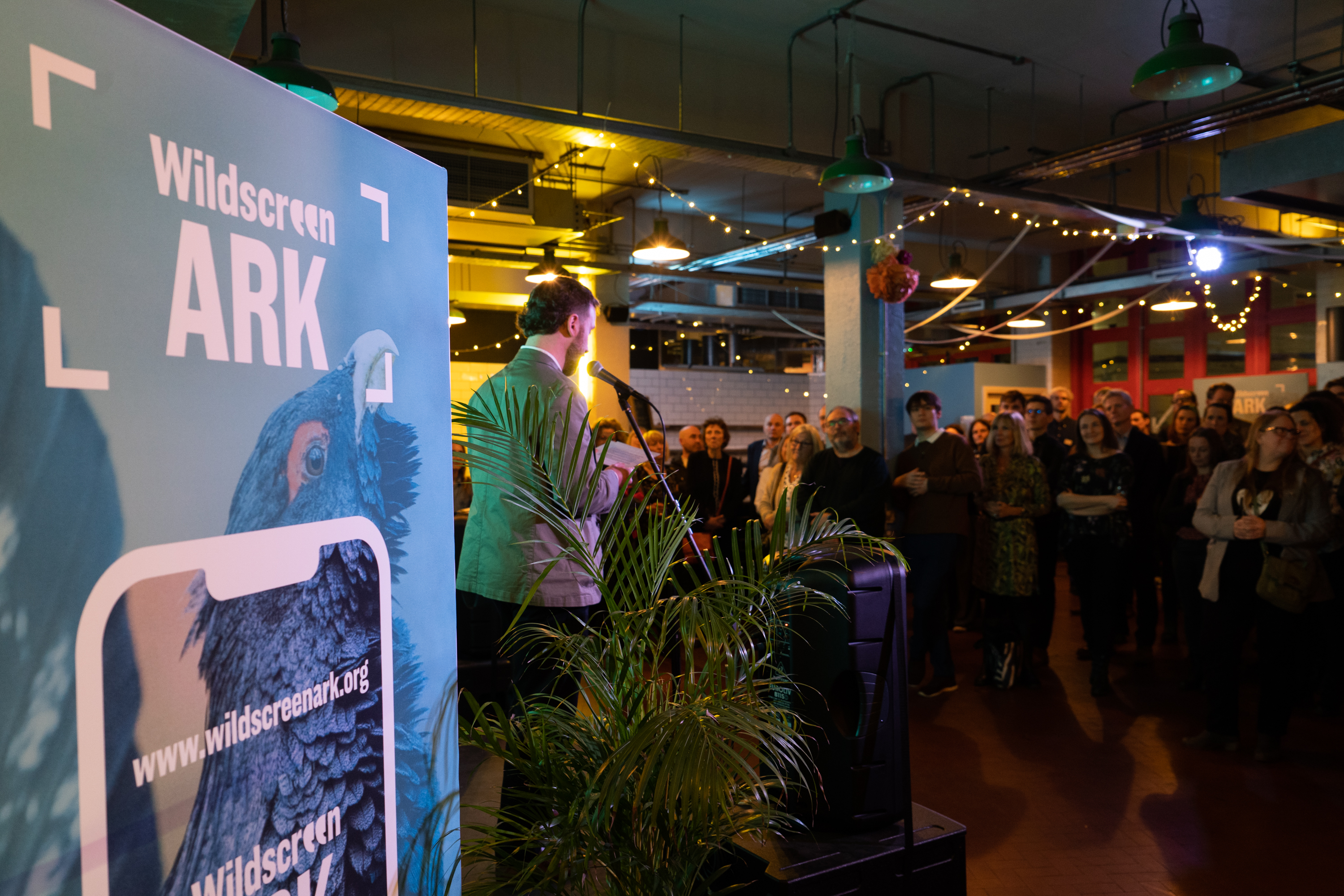
Wildscreen ARK Launch Party 2024

ARKive was a global initiative with the mission of "promoting the conservation of the world's threatened species, through the power of wildlife imagery", which it did by locating and gathering films, photographs and audio recordings of the world's species into a centralised digital archive. Its priority was the completion of audio-visual profiles for the c. 17,000 species on the IUCN Red List of Threatened Species.

The project was an initiative of Wildscreen, a UK-registered educational charity, based in Bristol. The technical platform was created by Hewlett-Packard, as part of the HP Labs' Digital Media Systems research programme.

ARKive had the backing of leading conservation organisations, including BirdLife International, Conservation International, International Union for Conservation of Nature (IUCN), the United Nations' World Conservation Monitoring Centre (UNEP-WCMC), and the World Wide Fund for Nature (WWF), as well as leading academic and research institutions, such as the Natural History Museum; Royal Botanic Gardens, Kew; and the Smithsonian Institution. It was a member of the Institutional Council of the Encyclopedia of Life.

Two ARKive layers for Google Earth, featuring endangered species and species in the Gulf of Mexico were produced by Google Earth Outreach. The first of these was launched in April 2008 by Wildscreen's Patron, Sir David Attenborough.

Due to lack of funding, the website was closed on 15 February 2019 and the media collection taken offline. Its successor, Wildscreen ARK (https://wildscreenark.org/), was launched in February 2024.

== History ==
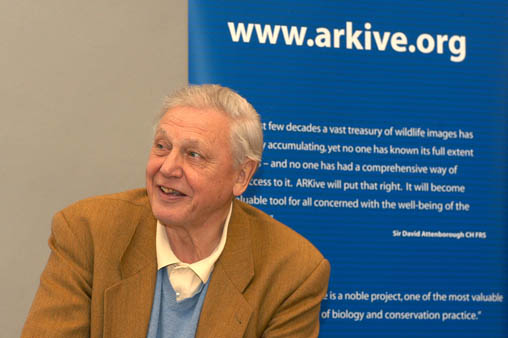
Sir David Attenborough and the ARKive

The project formally was launched on 20 May 2003 by its patron, the UK-based natural history presenter, Sir David Attenborough, a long-standing colleague and friend of its chief instigator, the late Christopher Parsons, a former Head of the BBC Natural History Unit. Parsons never lived to see the fruition of the project, succumbing to cancer in November 2002 at the age of 70.

Parsons identified a need to provide a centralised safe haven for wildlife films and photographs after discovering that many such records are held in scattered, non-indexed, collections, often with little or no public access, and sometimes in conditions that could lead to loss or damage. He believed the records could be a powerful force in building environmental awareness by bringing scientific names to life. He also saw their preservation as an important educational resource and conservation tool, not at least because extinction rates and habitat destruction could mean that images and sounds might be the only legacy of some species' existence.

His vision of a permanent, accessible, refuge for audio-visual wildlife material won almost immediate support from many of the world's major broadcasters, including the BBC, Granada, international state broadcasting corporations and National Geographic magazine; leading film and photographic libraries, international conservation organisations and academic institutes such as Cornell University.

The initial feasibility study for creating ARKive was carried out in the late 1980s by conservationist John Burton, but at the time the costs of the technology needed were too far too high, and so it was over a decade later, after the technology had caught up with Christopher Parsons's vision (and the costs dropped), that the project was able to get off the ground.

After capital development funds of £2m were secured from the Heritage Lottery Fund in 1997 and New Opportunities Fund in 2000, work on building ARKive began as part of the UK's Millennium celebrations, using advanced computerised storage and retrieval technology devised for the project by Hewlett-Packard, with an initial capacity of up to 74 terabytes of data, using redundant hardware and multiple copies of media stored at multiple sites. Media was digitised to the highest available quality without compression and encoded to open standards.

A prototype site was online as early as April 1999. There were several design iterations before the formal launch.

By the launch date, the project team had researched, catalogued, copied, described and authenticated image, sound and fact files of 1,000 animals, plants and fungi, many of them critically endangered. More multi-media profiles are added every month, starting with British flora and fauna and with species included on the Red List – that is, species that are believed to be closest to extinction, according to research by the World Conservation Union. By January 2006, the database had grown to 2,000 species, 15,000 still images and more than 50 hours of videos. By 2010, over 5,500 donors had contributed 70,000 film clips and photos of more than 12,000 species.

In February 2019, Wildscreen announced that they "...have had to make the very hard decision to close the Arkive website on 15 February 2019", due to funding issues. On that date the website was replaced with a short statement, concluding:

The complete Arkive collection of over 100,000 images and videos is now being stored securely offline for future generations.

== Recognition ==
The site was Sunday Times website of the year for 2005. It was a 2010 Webby Award honouree for its outstanding calibre of work, in the 'Education' category, and a 2010 Association of Educational Publishers 'Distinguished Achievement Award' winner, in the category for websites for 9-to-12-year-olds.

== See also ==
- Catalogue of Life
- Encyclopedia of Life
- List of online encyclopaedias
