= Christopher Parsons =

English wildlife film-maker

Christopher Parsons OBE
- Born: Christopher Eugene Parsons; 23 August 1932; Winchester, Hampshire, England
- Died: 8 November 2002 (aged 70); Littleton-upon-Severn, Gloucestershire, England
- Education: Mount Radford School
- Alma mater: University College of the South West of England
- Occupations: Wildlife film-maker; Television producer
- Known for: Head of the BBC Natural History Unit

Christopher Eugene Parsons OBE (23 August 1932 – 8 November 2002) was an English wildlife film-maker and the executive producer of David Attenborough's Life on Earth nature documentary. As a founding member and a former Head of the BBC Natural History Unit, he worked on many of its early productions and published a history of its first 25 years in 1982. Besides television, he was also passionate about projects which helped to bring an understanding of the natural world to a wider audience, notably the Wildscreen Festival and ARKive.

== Film-making career ==
After obtaining a degree in science from the University College of the South West of England, Exeter, Christopher Parsons joined the BBC in 1955. He began as an apprentice film editor at the newly formed West Region Film Unit in Bristol, England. Here, he worked on a wide range of programmes in the fledgling medium of television, including some of the BBC's earliest natural history films.

In 1957 he was one of the founding members of the BBC Natural History Unit, becoming a pioneer of the genre alongside names such as Peter Scott, Tony Soper, Pat Beech and Eric Ashby. His early work included roles editing and producing Look, the Unit's first series, which was presented by Scott. In 1963 he produced the Unit's first film in colour, The Major, though it was another four years before the programme could be transmitted in colour.

Parsons accompanied his friend Gerald Durrell on animal-collecting expeditions to Australia and Sierra Leone to produce the television series Two in the Bush (1962) and Catch Me a Colobus (1966). In 1968, he became series editor of The World About Us, a new strand of nature documentaries commissioned for BBC Two by then controller David Attenborough. The strand was renamed The Natural World in 1983 and new episodes were broadcast annually until 2019.

When Attenborough began commissioning ambitious landmark documentary series for BBC Two on subjects as diverse as science, economics and art history, Parsons decided that natural history would make an ideal subject for such a venture, and drafted the synopsis of a 13-part series he called Life on Earth. In 1970, he travelled to London to persuade Attenborough to present the series, only to discover that both of them had had the same idea. Financing and filming challenges delayed production, and it was not until 1979 that Life on Earth finally reached the screen. The series drew widespread acclaim and helped to establish the reputation of the Natural History Unit. When it was rewarded with departmental status in 1979, Parsons became the first official Head of the Unit. (Previous leaders were called senior producers).

In 1982, he received an award for programme excellence from the Royal Television Society and was appointed OBE for his outstanding services to broadcasting. The same year, his history of the first 25 years of the Natural History Unit, True to Nature, was published. After stepping down from his role as Head in 1983, he was appointed to develop commercial opportunities for the BBC by utilising the growing library of archive natural history footage. He set up Wildvision to sell re-packaged programmes and videos internationally, and helped to establish BBC Wildlife magazine in 1983.

Parsons left the BBC in 1988 to return to film production, making large-format films for museums, zoos and aquaria. In the 1990s he produced a number of IMAX nature documentaries, working with the IMAX Natural History Film Unit and West Eagle Films. These included Mountain Gorillas (1992), The Secret of Life on Earth (1992) and Survival Island (1996), the latter a second collaboration with David Attenborough. His final film was a millennium project about his home village of Littleton-upon-Severn in Gloucestershire.

== Other projects ==
In 1982, Parsons and Peter Scott co-founded the Wildscreen Festival in Bristol, a biennial event which recognises and celebrates the achievements of wildlife film-makers, the first of its kind in the world. At the 1990 festival, Parsons was presented with the Outstanding Achievement Award which is now named in his honour. He went on to co-found and become a patron of the Wildscreen Trust, an educational charity established in 1987 to promote an understanding of the natural world through audiovisual material.

From 1995 to 2000 he was a Director of Wildscreen, overseeing the building of Wildwalk-at-Bristol, a new visitor attraction in the city. Developed with funding from the National Lottery, its aim was to raise awareness of global biodiversity and conservation issues using a combination of live animal exhibits, videos and interactive displays. Recognition for his achievements came with the WWF International award for Conservation Merit in 1990 and honorary membership of the Linnean Society of London, for services to natural history.

His final project was a long-standing passion to establish an electronic database of all the world's species, first mooted in the early 1980s before the necessary technology was available. The resulting website, ARKive, went live in May 2003. Parsons never lived to see the fruition of the project, succumbing to cancer in November 2002 at the age of 70. In 2003, the World Land Trust, of which he had been a Trustee, dedicated a rainforest reserve in Ecuador in his memory.

== Film and TV credits ==
The following is a list of Parsons's main productions:

- The Unknown Forest (1960) – producer
- The Major (1963) – producer
- Two in the Bush (1962) – producer
- Unarmed Hunters (1964) – producer
- Look (1955–1964) – editor and producer
- A Bull Named Marius (1966) – producer
- Catch Me A Colobus (1966) – producer
- Animal People (1967) – producer
- The Man Who Loved Giants (1971) – producer
- Animals in Action (1973) – producer
- Their World (1973) – presenter and producer
- The World About Us (1968–1976) – series editor
- Life on Earth (1979) – executive producer
- Mountain Gorillas (IMAX) (1992) – producer
- The Secret of Life on Earth (IMAX) (1994) – producer
- Survival Island (IMAX) (1996) – producer
