= The Major =

- Written by: Desmond Hawkins
- Narrated by: Paul Rogers
- Music by: George Shears

Production
- Producer: Christopher Parsons
- Cinematography: Eric Ashby; Leslie Jackman
- Editor: Paul Khan
- Running time: 35 minutes

Original release
- Network: BBC
- Release: 1963

The Major is the first BBC natural history documentary film to be made in colour, though it was originally screened, in 1963, in black and white, as colour television broadcasts did not begin in the United Kingdom until 1967. After that it became one of the BBC Natural History Unit's most repeated shows.

It describes the felling of an eponymous, three-century-old, oak tree, which has become considered a hazard to traffic, and the effect that that has on the wildlife that lives in it, and on the fictionalised English village in which it grew.

Actor Paul Rogers narrated a script by Desmond Hawkins. Filming was by Eric Ashby and Leslie Jackman, the latter filming the insect scenes at his home in Paignton. The 35-minute film was produced by Christopher Parsons. The music was composed and conducted by George Shears and performed by the BBC's West of England Players.

Although the tree was in the Forest of Dean, filming of the "nearby" village was actually done at Eastcombe in the Cotswolds, and the village cricket match there was played by actors.
