= Eric Ashby (naturalist) =

British photographer (1918–2003)

Eric Ashby MBE
- Born: 19 January 1918; Cumberland, England
- Died: 6 February 2003 (aged 85)
- Occupation: Wildlife cameraman
- Awards: Cherry Kearton Medal and Award

Eric Ashby MBE (19 January 1918 – 6 February 2003) was an English naturalist and wildlife cameraman, often working for the BBC Natural History Unit.

== Personal life ==
Ashby was born in Cumberland, England on 19 January 1918. Not long afterwards, his family moved to Southsea, Hampshire, where he was raised. At the age of 12, he visited and was influenced by a natural history film show presented by Cherry Kearton at the South Parade Pier there. During World War II, he worked as a farmer in Devon, with his brother Rex. He moved to Linwood, in the New Forest in 1953. In later years, he and his wife Eileen nursed injured foxes at their home there, Badger Cottage. He was also involved in campaigning to protect New Forest badger setts from harm by fox hunts. He was involved in a number of court cases against the New Forest Buck Hounds, his local hunt, and its members, after they trespassed onto his land, variously killing a young buck deer, damaging a badger sett and forcing him to abandon a BBC commission to film badger cubs there.

== Career ==
When he was 16, Ashby's first article, "Bird photography: an ideal hobby for boys", was published in Boy's Own Paper.

His first full-length film, The Unknown Forest (45 minutes) was shown on the BBC in 1961. Ashby had spent four years of his own time making it. The writer Richard Mabey says that this film "permanently changed the standards for home-grown wildlife documentaries". Among Ashby's other films was 1963's The Major, the BBC's first wildlife film made in colour. Though originally broadcast in black and white, once screened in colour, in 1967, it became one of the Natural History Unit's most repeated shows.

Unlike many of his early contemporaries, Ashby refused to film tame animals, preferring to painstakingly film natural activity, This led to Sir Peter Scott coining his nickname, "The Silent Watcher". Ashby used the name as the title for his second television film. He also developed the habit of making cameo appearances in his documentaries, as a figure half-seen in shadows, watching wildlife. He otherwise kept a low profile, shunning public appearances.

He was awarded the Royal Geographical Society's Cherry Kearton Medal and Award in 1975, and was made MBE in 1992, for his work with wildlife. He died on 6 February 2003. His wife survived him. He bequeathed most of his film and photographic archive to the charitable conservation project ARKive. A smaller archive was donated to the environmental charity No More Dodos in 2018, by the trustees of his wife Eileen's estate.

== Bibliography ==
- —— (1989). The Secret Life of the New Forest. Chatto & Windus. ISBN 0701134046. – Introduction by Richard Mabey
- —— (2000). My Life With Foxes. Robert Hale Ltd. ISBN 978-0709065616. – Foreword by Chris Packham
