= David Attenborough's Life Stories =

Series of radio monologues on the subject of natural history

- Cover of the audio book based on the series
- Genre: Monologues
- Running time: unlimited
- Country of origin: United Kingdom
- Language(s): English
- Home station: BBC Radio 4
- Hosted by: David Attenborough
- Produced by: Julian Hector
- Original release: 5 June 2009 – 1 July 2011
- No. of episodes: 40
- Website: www.bbc.co.uk/programmes/b00krkgt

David Attenborough's Life Stories is a series of monologues written and spoken by British broadcaster David Attenborough on the subject of natural history. They were broadcast on BBC Radio 4 in 2009 as part of the station's "Point of View" strand, in the weekly timeslot formerly occupied by Alistair Cooke's Letter from America. In each of the 20 programmes, Attenborough discusses a particular subject of personal resonance, drawing on his experience of six decades filming the natural world. The series was produced by Julian Hector, head of radio at the BBC Natural History Unit.

A second 20-part series of Life Stories called New Life Stories began on 18 February 2011.

== Background ==
The commissioning of Life Stories was announced in January 2009. Speaking of his move from television to radio, Attenborough remarked that "It's a chance to talk about fossils, archaeopteryx" and other subjects close to his heart, including his first pet, a salamander, and his favourite animal - the bird-of-paradise. The programmes were broadcast on Friday evenings and repeated on the Sunday morning of the same week. They were also broadcast on the BBC World Service station as part of the "Letter from" strand. During the series run, each episode was made available as a podcast on the Radio 4 website, and are still available on the BBC Sounds app.

== Episodes ==
=== Series 1 (2009) ===
No.	Title	Original release date
1.01	"Sloths"	5 June 2009
Attenborough reveals a particular affection for the three-toed sloth, an animal he encountered first-hand while filming Zoo Quest in British Guiana. The sloth's coarse hair grows forward in a fringe and is centrally-parted along its belly, adaptations which help to keep it dry as it hangs upside down in the rainforest canopy. When the first skins and skeletons arrived in Europe, natural history artists drew the sloth upright, but its thin, rod-like legs cannot support its weight, rendering it helpless on the ground. Sloths have poor eyesight and are virtually deaf, but possess an acute sense of smell. Attenborough describes their peculiar routine of visiting a communal toilet at the base of a special tree. Their faeces are especially pungent, and this helps sloths locate one another in the breeding season. Unlike land-based herbivores, which need great size or speed to avoid predation, sloths can devote their time to slowly digesting leaves other species find unpalatable. "In short, you become slothful", says Attenborough, adding that he is not sure whether there's a moral in all this.
1.02	"Monstrous Flowers"	12 June 2009
Although Attenborough prefers modest flowers, some wild plants produce blooms of monstrous proportions. The largest, produced by the titan arum, consists of a huge cone of unfurled fronds surrounding a central spike up to ten feet high. Attenborough travelled to Sumatra to film it for The Private Life of Plants, but finding one in bloom was not easy. Titan arums are widely dispersed and flower for just three days. Nobody knew how the blooms were pollinated, but Attenborough was able to film tiny sweat bees delivering pollen to the several dozen female florids which cluster at the base of the stem. The bees are attracted by the arum's pungent scent, and the tall spike helps to disperse it through the forest. The honour of the largest single flower belongs to Rafflesia, a parasite which takes its nutrients from its host plant, a vine. With no economic cost to Rafflesia of growing big flowers, it produces an enormous bloom three feet across. Attenborough is reminded of English stately homes, and calls Rafflesia "the aristocrat of the plant world".
1.03	"Platypus"	19 June 2009
Duck-billed platypus In 1799, when the first platypus skin was brought back from Australia, English naturalists examined its duck-like beak, fur and webbed feet and declared it a hoax. The beak contains sensory receptors which it uses to find food underwater, a skill Attenborough likens to metal detecting. Platypuses lay eggs, a highly unusual means of reproduction for a mammal. Attenborough wanted to film the eggs hatching for Life on Earth to illustrate the transition from reptiles to mammals. Despite the BBC offering to fund a captive platypus research programme, no scientists came forward, partly because the species had never bred successfully in captivity. The producers eventually found archive footage of a baby platypus emerging from an egg, but the crucial moment of hatching was missing. A second chance came during the making of The Life of Mammals, and this time, technology helped to overcome the problem. An endoscopic camera was fed into the nesting chamber of a wild platypus to capture the first images of her baby suckling milk. Filming the egg-cracking moment, however, remains an elusive prize.
1.04	"Giant Birds"	26 June 2009
When Marco Polo reached the court of Kublai Khan, he was shown the egg of a roc, a giant bird of prey said to be capable of carrying off and killing elephants. Other historical tales of giant birds had more credence. The elephant bird (Aepyornis) of Madagascar was first reported in the 17th century. Long since extinct, it is now known only from skeletons, which resemble an ostrich rather than an eagle, and fragments of eggshells. Whilst on a 1960s filming trip to Madagascar, Attenborough assembled a complete egg from fragments brought to him by a local goatherd. He explains why such birds gave up flight. After the demise of the dinosaurs, birds and mammals competed for dominance of the land. On continental fragments which broke away from the supercontinent before mammals established their superiority, birds won the battle. Madagascar is one such place, as is New Zealand, where a dozen species of flightless moa once ruled the islands. Although some moas were comparable in size to Aepyornis, the latter's eggs are still the largest ever discovered.
1.05	"Songsters"	3 July 2009
Attenborough considers the purpose of songs, questioning the evolutionary advantage which led to the human larynx developing into a complex, precise instrument. The answers can be found in the natural world. Birdsong differs between species and even individuals, and is characterised by sustained melodic phrases rather than short, simple vocalisations. Research has shown that the most complex songsters have the best chance of attracting a mate, so singing has a sexual purpose. Attenborough next considers mammals, where the gibbon species are particularly adept exponents of song. Males sing daily from the treetops, and in doing so attract the interests of females. When a female joins a male in pair bond, she performs a "magnificent solo aria" and their duet culminates in a "wildly passionate climax". Attenborough speculates that male gibbons with the most complex songs get the most female attention. In humans, songs generate camaraderie and spiritual emotion, but their chief role is still sexual. "Shakespeare wondered if music was the food of love", concludes Attenborough. "Vocally, it was, and what is more, it still is."
1.06	"Bower Birds"	10 July 2009
A bower bird's bower Male bowerbirds build structures to show off the various jewels and treasures they collect from the forest. They do so to impress females, for the bower serves a similar purpose to the extravagant plumage of male pheasants and birds-of-paradise. The most impressive is built by the Vogelkop bowerbird from eastern New Guinea. Males build a wigwam structure several feet across, with a thatched roof and a mossy lawn outside the entrance where they carefully arrange their displays in neat piles – flower petals, iridescent beetle wing cases or rare fungi. Females tour the bowers and only alight on the one which they find most impressive, at which point the male emerges from his wigwam to mate with her. Filming bowerbirds must be done from a hide, so to stand any chance of filming copulation you must select the bower that you think will most impress a female bird. The odds of doing so are in fact quite good, says Attenborough, showing that "we and bowerbirds have the same aesthetic sense and preferences, and that thought pleases me no end."
1.07	"Dragons"	17 July 2009
Early natural history encyclopaedias included fire-breathing dragons, "perfectly rational attempts to turn travellers' exaggerations into terms of flesh and blood", explains Attenborough. Long after dragons had disappeared from reference books, a 1910 expedition to the Dutch East Indies reported sightings of gigantic lizards on the island of Komodo. The popular press seized upon the dragon moniker and the name stuck. In the 1950s, Attenborough and his cameraman Charles Lagus travelled to Komodo to obtain the first proper footage of the dragons in the wild. On first sight, Attenborough thought them impressive but quite docile, and questioned whether their fearsome reputation was really justified. Since then, research has revealed that they do indeed kill as well as scavenge, preying on buffalo, deer, pigs and goats. They infect their victim with a venomous bite and stalk it for a week or more until it succumbs. They are also cannibals, which may explain their great size. Komodo dragons acquired by zoos have proved difficult to breed, but it has recently been discovered that females can reproduce by parthenogenesis.
1.08	"Archaeopteryx"	24 July 2009
Attenborough tells the story of one of the Natural History Museum's "great wonders", its Archaeopteryx fossil. Unearthed in a Bavarian limestone quarry in 1860, it later came into the possession of a local doctor and was acquired by the museum's first curator Richard Owen for £700 in 1861. This was a princely sum and recognition of Archaeopteryx's significance. At 150 million years old, it contains the earliest examples of feathers, which adorn the forelimbs and tail of a small dinosaur-like creature. The 1860s was a critical time in scientific history owing to Darwin's recently-published Origin of Species. However, Owen believed that God had created the archetypes for all species, and classified archaeopteryx as a bird. Most scientists, however, sided with Darwin and recognised it as an intermediate species between birds and reptiles. Further Archaeopteryx fossils have since been discovered, and in China, fossilised flightless dinosaurs with feathers on their bodies. These theropods may have developed feathers to control heat loss. Attenborough suggests that the origin of flight lies in feathered dinosaurs becoming arboreal and gliding between trees.
1.09	"Salamander"	31 July 2009
Fire salamander The young Attenborough was given a glossy black and yellow fire salamander by his father for his eighth birthday. These amphibians are one of several hundred species in the salamander family. They range in size from the giant salamanders of China and Japan to the minute salamanders of North America's forests. The fire salamander, a European species, may have been so named for its supposed ability to quench fire. Pliny tested this theory "rather callously" by putting one in the flames, with obvious consequences. Attenborough was so enamoured with his pet, he decided to give his son a fire salamander on his eighth birthday too. They watched in astonishment as it released over a dozen babies into the pool of water they had provided in its tank. Attenborough and son hand-reared the young, but never quite weaned them off the habit of taking their food from forceps. Eventually, he managed to distribute them all to school friends, nieces and nephews, but never dared tell their mothers that "in captivity, fire salamanders have been known to live for 50 years".
1.10	"Birds of Paradise"	7 August 2009
Attenborough divulges his love of the "wonderfully and incontrovertibly beautiful" birds-of-paradise. They first became known to Europeans in 1522, when Ferdinand Magellan returned to Portugal with skins from the Bachian islands. The legs, skeleton and wings had been removed to best display the bird's extraordinary plumage. The Bachianese traded in the skins with islands further east, but had never seen living specimens. They believed that the birds floated in the heavens feeding on dew, and in an age when fire-breathing dragons were still presumed to exist, European naturalists believed the Bachianese story. They named them Paradisaea apota, the footless birds-of-paradise. The true character of the birds only became apparent when European explorers penetrated the island of New Guinea in the nineteenth century. Here, the abundance of food and lack of predators has promoted a polygamous lifestyle in which the males play no part in nest-building or raising young. They therefore devote their time to impressing the females, whose preference for different colours, forms and displays has resulted in the diversity of species alive today.
1.11	"The Serpent's Stare"	14 August 2009
Attenborough confesses that the "unblinking, vague gaze" of a snake still unsettles him, even after years of watching and filming the animals. He describes the unique features of a snake's eye, and how they have led scientists to theorise that the family has evolved from an ancestor that had a subterranean lifestyle. He describes some features of other creatures that live underground, including caecilians, amphibians which have lost all their limbs and their eyes. Moles, by contrast, have adopted a subterranean lifestyle only recently, and have so far retained these features. After the extinction of the dinosaurs, it is believed that snakes emerged to hunt small rodent-like mammals, and their eyes developed along a different evolutionary path to those of other animals. Their ears are connected to their jaws and they can smell using their forked tongues, just as monitor lizards do. The most advanced snakes, the pit vipers, have additional sense organs beneath their eyes which detect changes in temperature. This enables them to strike precisely at their warm-blooded prey, even in darkness.
1.12	"Faking Fossils"	21 August 2009
A trilobite fossil Attenborough vividly recalls his fossil-hunting trips as a child in Leicestershire, and the thrill of discovering a 200-million-year-old ammonite for the first time. The practice of carving snake heads on to the ammonites gave them their alternative name of "snake-stones". Fossils have long been altered to improve their value, but today, the forgers target science rather than superstition. Attenborough describes how he has been a victim when making a film about trilobites in the Atlas Mountains. These spectacular fossils were sold at the roadside, but he sought out a remote mountain village which supplied the traders where he discovered hundreds in the dimly-lit back room of a hut. With time running out, he began hurriedly sorting through the pile, and elected to purchase a pair of trilobites mating. But as he unwrapped his purchase a short distance down the road, he realised it was a fake. Trilobites were marine creatures and would have mated by releasing their eggs and sperm into the water, not by copulating.
1.13	"Coelacanth"	28 August 2009
In December 1952, Attenborough produced a television programme about the coelacanth, a fish which until 1938 was only known from the fossil record. A second specimen had recently been caught in South African waters. At the time, scientists thought that the coelacanth's bony fins, which could have propelled the fish along the seabed, were evidence of a possible evolutionary link between fish and land-based vertebrates. During the making of Life on Earth in the 1970s, Attenborough realised that footage of a live coelacanth would be a major coup for the series. When reports arrived that a fisherman had caught one in the Comoros Islands, a BBC cameraman was dispatched to the scene. The dying fish was placed back in the water to be filmed, and Life on Earth had its coup. The natural behaviour of a wild coelacanth was first filmed by a German expedition in 1999. Scientists now play down the significance of the coelacanth's bony fins, but Attenborough is excited by the prospect of other fossil fish turning up alive in a fisherman's net.
1.14	"The Dodo"	4 September 2009
Attenborough uses two case studies to illustrate how island species have suffered due to human interference. Ancestral dodos arrived on Mauritius on storm winds, and gave up flying as they had no need to evade predators. With a varied diet and an abundant food supply, they grew as large as turkeys. What's more, the dodos were guileless and inquisitive, presenting an easy meal for hungry sailors. The introduction of rats, cats, pigs and monkeys compounded the dodo's problems, and by 1690 it was extinct. Isolation on remote North Atlantic islands caused the great auk to become flightless, but once discovered by man, they were slaughtered in their thousands each summer for their flesh and rich oil, becoming extinct by the 1850s. The huge penguin colonies around Antarctica are a more recent discovery. Here, isolation from land predators and a diet of fish has made them better adapted for swimming than flying. Now that humans are venturing to Antarctica in ever-increasing numbers, Attenborough fears for the penguins' future and hopes "this time we might take a lesson from history."
1.15	"Tracks"	11 September 2009
Dinosaur tracks Indigenous communities that live off the land rely on their tracking skills to catch game. Attenborough describes his first-hand experience watching bushmen in Africa. Whilst he could determine the tracks they followed were made by a kudu, they could deduce the age of the animal, its speed and direction of travel and how long ago it had passed by. On another occasion, Attenborough became separated from his guides on a jungle path. He tried to follow their tracks, but ended up walking in circles and having to call for help. He is also fascinated by the tracks of extinct animals, and tells a humorous tale about an American who bought a section of dinosaur tracks to display in his back garden. "Oh my word," his neighbour exclaimed on seeing them, "I never knew they came so close to the house!" An extraordinary set of footprints have been preserved for 3.6 million years in Olduvai's volcanic ash deposits. They are the tracks of three bipedal humans – Attenborough dares to label them man, woman and child.
1.16	"Bird's Nest Soup"	18 September 2009
The white nest swiftlets of Borneo, explains Attenborough, use a very peculiar next material: their spittle. They build their nests on vertical cave walls in total darkness, using a simple form of echolocation to navigate. Bats, which roost hanging from cave roofs, have a more advanced echolocation system which developed earlier in evolutionary history. Attenborough recalls his attempts to film here, which involved him climbing a mound of bat guano crawling with cockroaches. After delivering his piece to camera on the ability of bats to skilfully navigate in the dark, the camera light was switched off and "a bat hit me fore-square in the face." He goes on to describe how men from nearby villages come to the cave every year to collect the swiftlets' nests. This is a dangerous activity, but the nests are prized in Chinese cuisine for their medicinal and intellectual benefits. They are mixed with chicken, corn, water and spices to create bird's nest soup. Attenborough sampled the raw nest material, but confesses that to his palette, it "tastes of nothing whatsoever".
1.17	"Adam's Face"	25 September 2009
Attenborough muses on the purpose of human eyebrows, suggesting that they were originally used by our ancestors to communicate through expressive facial gestures, much as many primates do today. He describes an occasion where he tested out the universality of the eyebrow-lift gesture. In 1971 he joined an expedition to a remote highland valley in central New Guinea to search for an uncontacted tribe, the Biami (the subject of Attenborough's TV documentary A Blank on the Map). After an exhausting trek on slippery paths through dense rainforest, they came across footprints. They followed them, but the people ahead were moving faster. Five mornings later, Attenborough woke to find seven Biami men watching him. He tried the eyebrow-lift, and they responded, but didn't smile. The Biami didn't understand the expedition's interpreters, so the only communication possible was by gestures. The explorers offered salt, which was traded for food, and indicated they would like to meet more of the tribe. They were led into thick forest, but the Biami disappeared and Attenborough saw no further sign of them.
1.18	"Amber"	2 October 2009
Spider in amber In 1938, Attenborough was given a piece of amber by a girl from Gdansk, a wartime refugee who stayed briefly with his family. Her home city has been a centre of the amber trade since the Bronze Age, but it was the Greeks who correctly deduced that it was a tree resin hardened to stone. Amber exposed in mudstone outcroppings on the seabed is washed up along the Baltic coast. Attenborough's piece contains the preserved remains of a fly. Other common inclusions include seeds, leaves, ants and even small lizards, clues to life as it was 40 million years ago. There are other sources in New World, chiefly the Dominican Republic. This amber is younger than its Baltic equivalent, but contains many similar species. Attenborough travelled there to film collectors mining the amber, and still enjoys examining some of the pieces he brought back with him. He also dispels the myth that extinct species could be recreated using DNA from the victims of mosquitoes trapped in amber. For him, the preserved remains of ancient life are "wonder enough".
1.19	"Large Blue"	9 October 2009
The large blue butterfly, the rarest of British blues, was highly prized by Victorian collectors, and by the 1950s was rapidly disappearing from Britain. Despite intensive conservation efforts, the species continued to decline and was declared extinct in 1979. The last colony on Dartmoor was studied at length by scientist Jeremy Thomas whose work helped to reveal the butterfly's complex life cycle. Attenborough describes how a large blue caterpillar secretes honeydew and pheromones to attract a particular species of red ant, Myrmica sabuleti, and through mimicry tricks the worker ants into caring for it inside the nest, where it feeds on their larvae. Thomas also discovered the ants only nest when temperature and humidity are stable, with grazing land being most suitable. Armed with this knowledge, conservationists have successfully reintroduced the large blue to southern Britain. In a further twist, a species of Ichneumon wasp parasitizes the large blue by attacking the sabuleti ants which protect the caterpillar. Attenborough believes the wasp should also be reintroduced, to complete the "marvellous intricate complexity" of the relationship between the three species.
1.20	"Collecting"	16 October 2009
Attenborough admits to a "strange affliction", the urge to collect, which has not been cured by advancing years. He ponders on the cause of this urge in humans, for examples from the animal kingdom always reveal a practical purpose; not so in our own species. He suspects it is largely a masculine phenomenon and can be explained by our deep-seated hunting instinct. Collecting fulfils an urge to hunt which is not satisfied by modern lifestyles. Items from the natural world have long been popular amongst collectors. Lord Walter Rothschild assembled the largest collection of natural history objects, and Charles Darwin's obsession with collecting all manner of fossils, plants, skins and shells during the Beagle expedition gave him the raw material for his theory of evolution by natural selection. Attenborough laments the fact that many natural objects are prevented from being collected by law. The collecting impulse stimulated his interest in natural history, leading to a lifetime of pleasure, and brought one man to a moment of genius which changed the course of history.

=== Series 2 (2011) ===
No.	Title	Original release date
2.01	"Canopy"	18 February 2011
If you walk into a rainforest you are immediately met by quite literally a forest of trees. All the tree trunks look like cathedral pillars, smooth and wet from the rain. Not a single branch emerges from the trunk for tens of metres - and when they do you see a breath-taking interlocking jungle of branches and leaves, ferns and flowers and all number of creatures great and small. The canopy is a bonanza of tropical forest life, in the bright light and gentle breeze - a far cry from the dark and humid underworld of the forest floor. Not surprising then that David Attenborough knew this would be a perfect place to film wildlife.
2.02	"Kiwi"	25 February 2011
David Attenborough tells us New Zealand had several species of flightless bird living across the islands, all of which are now extinct, bar one. The kiwi has become one of those species iconic of the country, like the koala to Australia, the giraffe to Africa and the alpaca to South America. Historically, New Zealand didn't have ground predators such as wild cats and stoats - which allowed birds to exploit living on the ground. Being flightless in New Zealand was a good way to be a bird. David Attenborough filmed kiwis and in this Life Story he muses on the niche the kiwi occupies on the ground. He argues the kiwi behaves more like a mammal than a bird, but what mammal do you think, in Attenborough's view, the kiwi most resembles?
2.03	"Charnia"	4 March 2011
David Attenborough has always been fascinated by fossils; even as a boy he'd spend many hours exploring the local quarry near his home in Leicestershire. And near his family home was a forest which he visited frequently, but didn't hunt for fossils there because he knew the rocks we too old to have any post cards of early life embedded in their layers. But he was wrong - those rocks harboured a wonderful secret - a secret that would rattle the cages of the big thinkers of the time and would change the story of life on earth forever.
2.04	"Foreign Fare"	11 March 2011
We sometimes forget that vegetables that we see as common-place today in all their varieties have wild origins. The potato for example is a name given to a tuber that both comes from Africa and South America - And the history of their discovery and export into our European markets can be traced by examining how those first explorers named the plants. In Foreign Fare, David Attenborough traces the discovery of some common vegetables to their wild beginnings - and the fascinating natural history of their use as food.
2.05	"Cicada"	18 March 2011
One of the great wild sounds of North America is the purring of insects in the evening, especially that of cicadas, one of the great stridulating sounds in the wild. This is the tale of one cicada; the 17-year periodic cicada that stunned the community in New England thirteen years after the Pilgrim Fathers had landed. There was a plague of insects, all with red eyes on stalks - and all emerging continuously out of the soil. When the plague subsided a few weeks later the people of Plymouth Rock were braced for another onslaught, but nothing happened until 17 years later. David Attenborough recalls a filming trip to New England to film this species of cicada with both fascinating natural history and a hilarious twist.
2.06	"Earthworms"	25 March 2011
Although Charles Darwin is especially well known for his work on the Theory of Evolution through his seminal work "On the Origin of Species", he also published a lot of his research on earthworms. Earthworms fascinated Darwin, so much so that his observations led him to believe that they showed marked intelligence. And earthworms fascinate David Attenborough too. He recalls a visit to Australia to film the giant earthworm and intriguingly used his ears more than any other sense to find them. What did they sound like and what did they look like? He reveals all.
2.07	"Wallace"	1 April 2011
It was the great travel books written in the 19th century by Alfred Russel Wallace that inspired David Attenborough himself to achieve great things in the realm of natural history. But Attenborough tells us that Wallace was more than just a great travel writer. His power of meticulous observation and recording as he explored many parts of the world were in the highest league imaginable, even for Victorian standards - and his power of analysis very much akin with Darwin, his great contemporary. Wallace independently came up with a theory of evolution that was in parallel to Darwin's thinking - two field naturalists breaking huge conventions of the time and coming up with the single most important theory in Biology. How did they resolve the conflict between themselves?
2.08	"Hummers"	8 April 2011
Hummingbirds are given spectacular names motivated by their striking colours, patterns and shimmering metallic iridescence; their names are beautiful as are the birds. David Attenborough has filmed them on several occasions and is fascinated by their agility and flying skills to drink nectar from flowers inaccessible to any other animal. And propelled by this rocket fuel of nature they are capable of flying great distances and living life in the fast lane. Enchanting in this story is how moved David Attenborough is when recalling a story of their conservation; a rare piece of good news he comments.
2.09	"Identities"	15 April 2011
You get a very different insight into the natural world when you have the opportunity to study the behaviour of individual animals. David Attenborough recalls with sumptuous delight spotting a blackbird in his garden with a white feather - "whitey" - giving him a window into the life of blackbirds and what's more, that individual. And, he says, he saw what blackbirds get up to! In this story Attenborough remembers filming spiders and filming chimpanzees, both of which benefited from someone knowing about the individuals - and whether you're a spider or a chimpanzee, you have a personality all of your own.
2.10	"Rats"	22 April 2011
It might be surprising to hear, but David Attenborough has made it known over the years that rats are not his favourite animal. In this piece, dedicated to his nemesis, Attenborough with great wit and skill tells us of the living nightmare he endured whilst on location in a place infested with them. If that wasn't enough, whilst making Life of Mammals, he devoted a whole programme to them - and to balance his own personal view went to an Indian temple where the rat is revered and even encouraged to swarm in vast numbers. But in a clever twist of the story, as is the hallmark of David Attenborough, in no uncertain way he tells us why they should be respected.
2.11	"Monsters"	29 April 2011
Fire breathing dragons are clearly something from legend, but what about a monster that lives in an ancient deep lake? In this edition of David Attenborough's Life Stories, Sir David reflects on a time when pre-eminent conservationist and naturalist Peter Scott was immersed in acquiring evidence of the existence of the Loch Ness Monster. No such giant creature has ever been found or concrete evidence it ever existed, but this is an intriguing tale of discovery. David Attenborough moves his story on to beyond the highlands of Scotland and into the Himalayas - and it's here that Sir David reveals something very surprising.
2.12	"Butterflies"	6 May 2011
When massing for their winter torpor in Mexico, the pine trees laden with monarch butterflies are one of the most mystical and magical places to be. David Attenborough is one of many naturalists, writers and broadcasters to marvel at this species migration feat and the spectacle of their over wintering - one of the natural wonders of the world. In this Life Story David Attenborough guides us through the butterfly's migration to Canada from Mexico - and back again - gently unpacking their natural history and wonder. And he immerses us in other butterfly congregations during filming trips over the years - but in a clever twist brings us back to his garden with an intriguing thought about the evolution of butterfly behaviour.
2.13	"Chimps"	13 May 2011
They say, David Attenborough reports, that we share more of our genes with chimpanzees than any other species alive today. And this proximity of Homo sapiens to the chimpanzee motivated Sir David even more to film behaviour never before seen. It had been known for some time that chimps hunt monkeys for meat, but it would be a first to film it for television audiences. To film such a hunt required days of waiting and tracking a troop through the Equatorial African forest - and when the hunt came and was over it changed Attenborough's view of chimps and their importance to us, forever.
2.14	"Cuckoo"	20 May 2011
The cuckoo is one of the iconic brood parasites of the world - the bird that cons another species into taking its egg as its own and rears the chick to fledging. In the single frame of the cuckoo you have a long distance migrant, travelling from Africa to breeding grounds in the temperate north, and back again. The cuckoo does not raise its own chick and across a range of cuckoo individuals, they parasitise several species of bird - all much smaller than they are. David Attenborough explores the world of the cuckoo and not only marvels at their natural history but tells the story of how a wildlife cameraman resolved a scientific mystery - and how the cuckoo itself harbours yet more secrets to science and natural history.
2.15	"Quetzalcoatlus"	27 May 2011
As David Attenborough explains, ".the biggest animal to fly was not a bird, but a reptile." - it was a Quetzalcoatlus, a pterosaur with at least a forty foot wingspan. David Attenborough, a huge fan of palaeontology, is skilled in bringing the past natural histories to life through stories about the discovery of key fossils. What a creature this "terrible lizard" must have been - big enough to scavenge the bodies of dead Tyrannosaurus and yet able to fly, probably in large numbers. And with a twist so typical of Sir David's writing, he brings this pterosaur to life at the very end.
2.16	"Chameleon"	3 June 2011
Many of the world's chameleons live on the huge continental island of Madagascar off the eastern coast of Africa. Some are tiny, as small as a finger nail - others in comparison are giants. Sir David Attenborough gives us a personal insight into the natural history of chameleons through one very special individual - a chameleon he had as a pet, called Rommel. In this life story you will feel as if you've met Rommel personally and with the delightful embrace with which Sir David writes, you smile all the way through.
2.17	"Nectar"	10 June 2011
The beautiful thick, sweet and luscious tasting delicacy of honey is one of the world's natural goodies. Indigenous peoples from all over the world will go to great lengths to get the honey from wild bees - and for most of us less connected to the natural world, we love this product of bees bought from the shop. Honey is nectar and David Attenborough poignantly points out this "was the first bribe in nature..." - it evolved one hundred million years ago with the flowering plants and drove the evolutionary relationship between animals and plants.
2.18	"Waterton"	17 June 2011
Squire Waterton of Walton Hall was an eccentric Englishman and gentleman who made many visits to South America and wrote about his travels. His travel books are "amongst the oddest I know" David Attenborough tells us, written in an odd, almost biblical style. But nevertheless, these books are accounts of natural history two hundred years ago. Attenborough argues that Waterton shouldn't be just remembered for his writing. He should be credited with establishing the first nature reserve in this country. Appalled by the ravages of the industrial revolution's impact on the landscape, he built a wall around his estate to protect the wildlife - and free of charge allowed people to visit, which they did in their masses.
2.19	"Fireflies"	24 June 2011
The chemistry that allows the combustion of natural chemicals to generate light without heat is wonderfully harnessed by the firefly. Fireflies are insects with several species in the group; each with its own species specific code and signalling regime. In this life story David Attenborough tells of his personal experience filming the antics of fireflies and the insight this gave him into this secret world of messaging.
2.20	"Elsa"	1 July 2011
David Attenborough tells us how, whilst en route to Madagascar, his bosses in the BBC asked him to break his journey in Kenya to visit the Adamsons. Joy and George Adamson were famous for hand rearing a lioness whom they called Elsa. Elsa was the central character in the book written by the couple "Born Free". In this Life Story Sir David cleverly takes us from the romanticism of Born Free and being close to habituated lions, to the harsh reality of befriending a big cat.

== Reception ==
The series drew widespread praise from the British press. Gillian Reynolds, radio critic for The Daily Telegraph, wrote "his opening talk, about his affinity with the gently ruminant three-toed sloth, was pure delight". She went on to describe Attenborough as a "gent, scholar, a brilliant communicator with a sense of humour", and added that "unlike many a radio broadcaster these days, he doesn't drop his voice on the key word in any sentence." The Observer's Kate Kellaway, comparing the "Sloth" episode to Attenborough's television work, wrote "if the marvellous first programme is anything to go by, it will prove that we do not need to be on televisual safari to be completely intrigued." Writing in The Times on Attenborough's delivery, Simon Barnes remarked that "all the time the lilting, dancing voice is alight with wonder and — let's call a spade a spade — love."

In May 2010, Attenborough won Speech Broadcaster of the Year at the Sony Radio Academy Awards for his work on Life Stories.

== Book and audio book ==
The complete series was released in audio book form and the scripts compiled in a hardback volume. Attenborough went on a national book signing tour to promote the titles, and also appeared on the BBC One chatshow Friday Night with Jonathan Ross to talk about the book. This book contains the same text that was used in Attenborough's speeches, along with pictures at the end of each chapter, accompanied by captions written by Attenborough.

- Life Stories by David Attenborough, published in hardcover edition by BBC Books on 1 October 2009 (ISBN 9780007338832)
- David Attenborough's Life Stories, 3CD audiobook set released by BBC Audio on 21 October 2009 (ISBN 9781408427446)
