= Mary Colwell =

Environmentalist and producer and author

Mary Colwell MBE
- Education: University of Bristol
- Employers: Freelance; (was BBC Natural History Unit)
- Spouse: Julian Hector
- Website: www.curlewaction.com

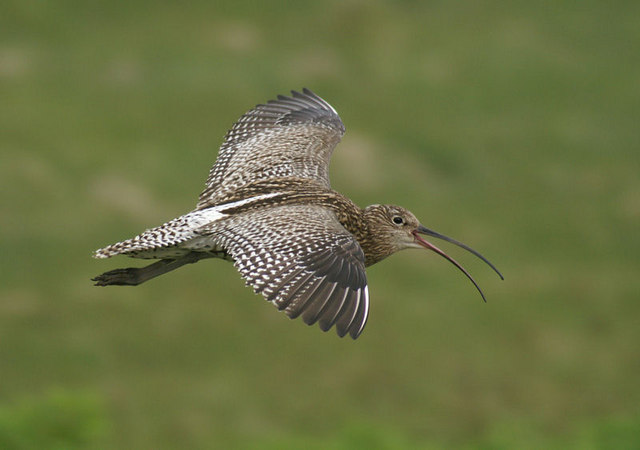
Eurasian Curlew (Numenius arquata)

Mary Colwell MBE is an English environmentalist author and producer. She previously worked for the BBC Natural History Unit. She is founder and director of the charity Curlew Action and Chair of the Curlew Recovery Partnership England, a Department for Environment, Food and Rural Affairs initiated roundtable dedicated to reversing the decline of the Eurasian Curlew.

== Early life ==
Colwell's mother was Roman Catholic from Northern Ireland, and her father was an Anglican from Stoke-on-Trent. She grew up near Stoke-on-Trent, and was raised as a Catholic. She studied sciences at both the University of Manchester and the University of Bristol, graduating from Bristol in 1986.

== Career ==
=== Producer ===
Colwell has produced numerous documentaries, one-off features and series for BBC Radio 4 including The Natural History Programme, Shared Planet with Monty Don, Natural Histories, Living World as well as presented programmes of her own such as The Nature of Creativity on Radio 3 and A Life With…. On Radio 4.

She has produced nature documentaries for Wildlife on One, Natural World, British Isles – A Natural History, Planet Earth: The Future, Bill Oddie's How to Watch Wildlife and the BBC 4 series, Walk on the Wild Side.

In 2007 she won the Garden Writers' Guild Award for best radio documentary for her series “Gardens of Faith”, five 15 minute programmes on how a world faith demonstrates its belief in their garden design.

In 2009 Colwell was awarded a Sony Radio Academy Gold Award for Best Podcast, the first award of its kind, for her production "The Budgerigar and the Prisoner", telling the story of a prisoner Les whose life was transformed by caring for a budgerigar. It also won a New York Radio Festival Gold medal.

=== Writer ===
In 2014, Lion Husdson published Colwell’s book on the Scottish-American naturalist John Muir, called John Muir: The Scotsman Who Saved America’s Wild Places. It is the only British biography of John Muir. A second, expanded edition is scheduled for publication by SPCK in 2027.

In 2016, Colwell undertook a 500 miles (800 km) walk from Lough Erne, near Enniskillen to Boston, Lincolnshire, to find out why the Eurasian Curlew (Numenius arquata) is declining so rapidly across Britain and Ireland. In 2018 Curlew Moon, was published by William Collins as an account of her self-titled "Curlew Walk" and the plight of the bird. it made Irish Independent's best non-fiction list of 2018.

In 2021 her third book Beak, Tooth and Claw was also published by William Collins. Her fourth book, The Gathering Place, was published by Bloomsbury in 2023 and was shortlisted on the Stanford’s best travel book of 2024. It details Colwell’s 500-mile pilgrimage along the Camino de Santiago in between lockdowns in the autumn of 2020.

=== Activism ===
In October 2017 she was awarded the Dilys Breese Medal by the BTO for outstanding science communication, in 2018, the David Bellamy Award from the National Gamekeepers' Organisation for her conservation work on curlews and in 2019, the WWT Marsh Award for Outstanding Contribution to Wetland Conservation. In 2022 she was awarded the RSPB Medal for her outstanding contribution to conservation.

In March 2021 she was appointed chair of the Department for Environment, Food and Rural Affairs initiated Curlew Recovery Partnership England, a roundtable of organisations charged with restoring Curlews, their habitats and associated wildlife across England. In 2020 she set up the charity, Curlew Action and established World Curlew Day. She led the successful campaign to establish a GCSE in Natural History, announced by the government in April 2022.

Colwell is a spokesperson for environmentalism in the United Kingdom and writes articles on the subject in journals, magazines and newspapers. She was listed in BBC Wildlife Magazine's Top 50 Most Influential Conservationists in the UK, and as one of the most influential conservationists by the ENDS report in 2023.

Colwell has campaigned with politician Caroline Lucas and educationist Tim Oates to establish a GCSE in Natural History.

== Personal ==
Colwell is married to BBC producer Julian Hector, and they have two sons (Hector has three daughters from a previous marriage).

Colwell's faith is an important part of her life, and she describes herself as a Christian.

== Works ==
=== Articles, interviews, and podcasts ===
- Colwell, Mary (13 July 2016). "Mary Colwell - Earth in Vision". OpenLearn.
- —————— (10 October 2018). "A forestry boom is turning Ireland into an ecological dead zone". TheGuardian.com.
- —————— (22 August 2019). Charlie (ed.). "Podcast: Mary Colwell — Curlews, GCSEs, and John Muir". The WAR ON WILDLIFE Project.
- ——————; MacMath, Terence Handley (27 May 2016). "Interview: Mary Colwell, producer, writer, and conservationist". Church Times.
- —————— (21 March 2016). SARX (ed.). "The Secrets Whispered in Every Living Being". SARX.

=== Bibliography ===
- Colwell, Mary (21 November 2014). John Muir: The Scotsman Who Saved America's Wild Places. Lion Books. ISBN 978-0745956664. OCLC 1055763289.
- —————— (19 April 2018). Curlew Moon. William Collins. ISBN 978-0008241056. OCLC 1035290266.
- —————— (29 April 2021). Beak, Tooth and Claw: Living with Predators in Britain. HarperCollins. ISBN 9780008354763.
