= Conservation land trust =

Conservation organization

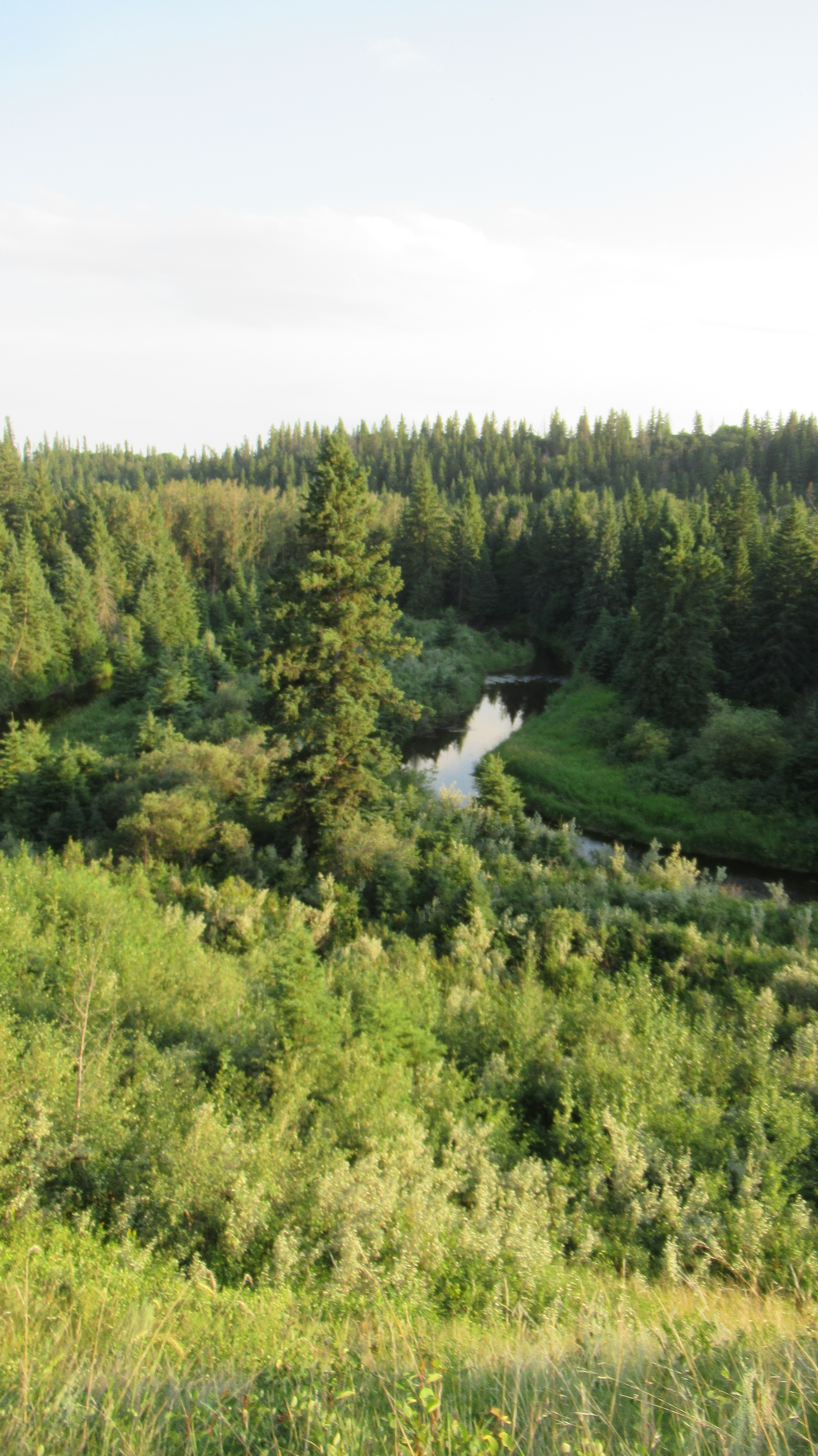
Pipestone Creek Conservation Area in Alberta Canada–Edmonton and Area Land Trust

Conservation land trusts are nonprofit organizations that acquire and steward land or conservation easements for the purpose of achieving environmental, agricultural, recreational, and/or species conservation goals. Conservation land trusts often work in cooperation with landowners to achieve shared goals and may provide public outreach events on the themes of science, environmental issues, species conservation, or other topics relevant to the land they work to protect. Priorities of conservation land trusts vary, but may include goals related to water quality, public access to land, and biodiversity. Oversight of these priorities and of the work carried out by the land trust typically rest with a board of directors. Conservation land trusts may operate in partnership with government agencies or under broader umbrella nonprofit organizations. Land trusts may focus their work in specific local areas delineated by political boundaries, habitat types, or ecological zones. Funding can be limited for the work of these organizations, such that many rely on volunteer labor.

== Regional land trusts ==
Although there are some global conservation land trust organizations that work across multiple continents, such as the World Land Trust and The Nature Conservancy, most land trusts focus on smaller regional areas. Conservation land trust organizations exist all across the world, and many belong to the International Land Conservation Network.

=== Land trusts in Africa ===
Some African conservation land trusts:

- Nature Conservation Egypt
- Nature Mauritania
- Save Valley Conservancy

=== Land trusts in North America ===
In North America, most conservation land trusts are found in the United States, with a growing number in Canada and Mexico. In the United States, the first conservation land trust organization was the Massachusetts Trustees of Reservations, founded in 1891. As of 2021, there were over 1,300 conservation land trusts in the United States, with 446 of these accredited by the Land Trust Accreditation Commission.

Some North American conservation land trusts:

- The Black Family Land Trust
- Blue Mountain Land Trust
- Center for Natural Lands Management
- Crooked Creek Conservancy
- Edmonton and Area Land Trust
- Maryland Environmental Trust
- Northcentral Pennsylvania Conservancy
- Sierra Gorda
- Sociedad De Historia Natural Niparajá A.C.

=== Land trusts in South America ===
Some South American conservation land trusts:

- Corporación Ambiental La Pedregoza
- Red Sudamericana de Conservacion Voluntaria (South American Network for Voluntary Conservation)
- Reserva Termas de Sotomó

=== Land trusts in Asia ===
Some Asian conservation land trusts:

- Asian Nature Conservation Foundation
- The National Trust of Korea
- Viet Nature Conservation Centre

=== Land trusts in Europe ===
Some European conservation land trusts:

- The Burrenbeo Trust
- Naturschutzstiftung Landkreis Aurich
- The Woodland Trust

=== Land trusts in Oceania ===
Some conservation land trusts in Oceania:

- Gondwana Link
- New Zealand Farm Environment Trust
- Tasmanian Land Conservancy

== See also ==
- Private protected area
