= The Private Life of the Kingfisher =

- Look episode
- Episode no.: Episode 144
- Directed by: Ronald Eastman; Rosemary Eastman
- Written by: Jeffery Boswall
- Narrated by: Peter Scott
- Cinematography by: Ronald Eastman
- Editing by: Tom Poore
- Production code: BBC Natural History Unit
- Original air date: 1966

"The Private Life of the Kingfisher" is a 1966 television episode of the nature series Look, was the first BBC natural history film to be shown in colour.

Depicting a pair of common kingfishers at their underground nest on the River Test in Hampshire, England, it was filmed and directed by Ronald and Rosemary Eastman, (Ron doing the photography and Rosemary the sound), written and produced by Jeffery Boswall, and narrated by Peter Scott.

The Eastmans originally submitted footage as an amateur contribution, but were commissioned by the BBC Natural History Unit to re-film it on a professional basis. The film proved so popular, that it was repeated eight times. It won the silver medal at the 1967 Moscow Film Festival.

Boswall subsequently commissioned a full series of similar Private Life of... films. Rosemary Eastman wrote about making the film in her 1969 book, The Kingfisher.

In 2012, the Eastman's daughter, Liz Bayliss, was interviewed about the film, on the BBC's Countryfile.
