= Julian Hector =

BBC television producer

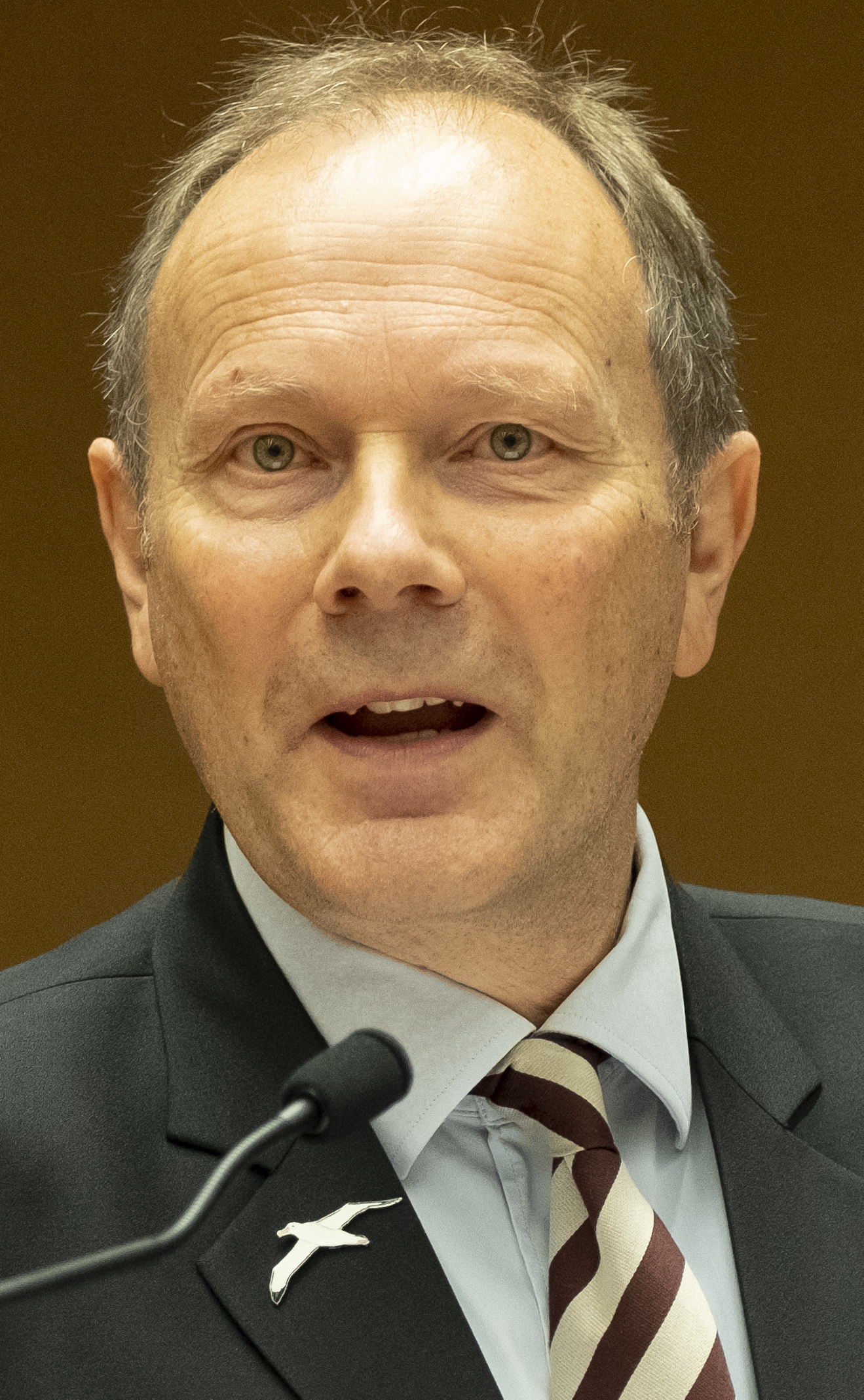
Julian Hector in 2019

Julian Hector (born 1958) is a British television and radio producer and executive who was Head of the BBC Natural History Unit. During his career, he has been producer of David Attenborough's Life Stories on BBC Radio 4, producer of the Tigers about the House television series, writer and producer of the Lakes and Rivers episode in the BBC’s Wild Africa series, producer of World on the Move, and instrumental in establishing the BBC's Tweet of the Day. He was described by Sir David Attenborough as ‘one of the most inventive producers in radio’ and during his award of an honorary doctorate from the University of Bristol was credited with bringing ‘live natural history programming to Radio 4’.

== Early life and education ==
Julian Alan Lowther Hector was born in 1958 in Nairobi, Kenya and educated at Bedford Modern School. He read Zoology at the University of Bristol, graduating in 1981, obtained a PhD from Bristol in 1985 and was made an honorary Doctor of Science by the University of Bristol in 2014.

In the later stage of his days as an undergraduate, Hector worked as a seabird ecologist with the British Antarctic Survey in South Georgia, an unpopulated British island 1400 km from the Falkland Islands. The project involved studying the breeding patterns of Albatrosses on Bird Island under the ultimate directorship of John Croxall and Sir Brian Follett. The project's work was ‘pioneering’ and uncovered why Albatrosses only breed every two years. Unfortunately the project coincided with the Falklands War which led to the four-man team being stranded on Bird Island as South Georgia was then occupied by the Argentine Army. The team was eventually rescued by the Royal Navy.

== Career ==
After a spell as an academic and working for various conservation organisations, Hector joined the BBC Natural History Unit in 1993 as a producer where he is credited with bringing ‘live natural history programming to Radio 4’ and Sir David Attenborough described him as ‘one of the most inventive producers in radio’. He became head of the BBC Natural History Unit and has been the producer of many popular series including David Attenborough's Life Stories, writer and producer of the Lakes and Rivers episode in the BBC’s Wild Africa series, Migration Live, World on the Move, Saving Species and Shared Planet, at all times ‘connecting the natural and human environments to tackle questions of conservation and social justice’. For television, in 2014 he was Executive producer of the Tigers about the House series.

Hector interviewed Sir David Attenborough at the Edinburgh International Television Festival (2017) in the 60th year of the NHU about the past, present and future of the NHU and its cultural contribution to the understanding and value of the natural world.

In 2019, Hector addressed the UN in Geneva at a panel on Circular Economy, Oceans and Plastics Pollution and talked about the "Blue Planet II Effect". The series full of emotional storytelling, captivated, entertained and surprised viewers and showed how devastating this very modern polluting phenomenon is having on marine creatures in our shared world.

In November 2019, the Chatham House Prize was jointly awarded by Her Majesty the Queen to Sir David Attenborough and BBC Studios NHU for the impact that Blue Planet II has had on tackling ocean plastic pollution. In his acceptance speech Hector said, "No one is immune to the upheaval caused by shifting climate. …Winning this prize and recognition for the work that we do at BBC Studio's Natural History Unit feels particularly significant this year, 2019, when the environment is the biggest story of them all."

Hector is credited with being one of the most influential chiefs of the Natural History Unit in its history adapting the content to serve audiences changing relationship with nature; growing the NHU business to an unprecedented level; changing the culture to fully reflect an inclusive culture and leaving a legacy that will last many years into the future.

Hector was made Honorary Professor at Salford University in March 2022 (announced 17 March 2022)

== Personal life ==
Julian Hector is married to Mary Colwell and has five children, three from a previous marriage and two with Mary Colwell, and six grandchildren. He is a qualified diver, sportive cyclist and sails a Wayfarer class dinghy.
