= Richard Matthews (filmmaker) =

South African documentary filmmaker

- Born: 21 November 1952
- Died: 3 March 2013 (aged 60)
- Citizenship: South Africa
- Occupations: wildlife filmmaker, television producer, television director and cameraman
- Awards: Emmy Awards, British Academy of Film and Television Arts (BAFTA) award

Richard Matthews (21 November 1952 – 3 March 2013) was a South African wildlife filmmaker, television producer, television director and cameraman. Matthews spent more than twenty years as a documentary filmmaker for the BBC Natural History Unit. His notable credits included the 2013 BBC television series, Africa, featuring Sir David Attenborough. Matthews won three Emmy Awards and one British Academy of Film and Television Arts (BAFTA) award for his work on wildlife programming.

Matthews lived in Bristol, England, for much of his life, as his former home was located near the BBC Natural History Unit's headquarters on Whiteladies Road. His production company created the "Nighmares of Nature" show for the BBC. He and his family had moved to Cape Town, South Africa in 2004. He specialized in aerial film shots following his return to South Africa.

Richard Matthews was killed in a small plane crash on 3 March 2013, while filming aerial footage over the Damaraland area of Kunene Region, Namibia. His pilot, Mark Berry, was also killed in the crash.
