= John Burton (conservationist) =

British conservationist (1944–2022)

John Andrew Burton FLS
- Burton at the Iguazu Falls in Brazil, 2010.
- Born: April 2, 1944; London, England
- Died: May 22, 2022 (aged 78)
- Occupations: Conservationist and nature writer
- Organization(s): Friends of the Earth, World Land Trust (Founder), National History Museum, TRAFFIC International (Founding Director, 1975), Bat Conservation Trust (Founding Chairman, 1991)
- Notable work: The Atlas of Endangered Species, 1991; Owls of the World, 1973; Close to Extinction, 1978; The Naturalist in London, 1974

John Andrew Burton (2 April 1944 – 22 May 2022) was a British conservationist and nature writer, known primarily for his founding and 30-year leadership World Land Trust (WLT), an international conservation land trust and environmentalist organization. In 2019 he was awarded the John Spedan Lewis Medal by the Linnean Society of London, of which he had been a Fellow for over 45 years.

== Early life and education ==
John Andrew Burton was born in 1944 in Streatham, London, to Andrew Burton, a portrait painter, and Edna May (née Ede). He attended Sunnyhill Junior School and then Alleyn's School in Dulwich. He first developed his lifelong interest in naturalism and zoology while in primary school, regularly exploring Biggin Wood in Croydon to catch and sell hedgehogs to the department store Harrods, which from 1917 to 2014 operated an exotic pet store selling wild animals such as lions, monkeys, and alligators.

== Conservationism career ==
Burton did not attend university after graduating from Alleyn's, instead taking a job at the Natural History Museum in London in 1963, as an information officer. He resigned in 1969 and embarked on a full-time career in journalism and nature writing, with a regular column at the New Scientist, and editorial roles at IPC Magazines' Birds of the World under John Gooders, and at Animals Magazine, which during his tenure became BBC Wildlife. During this period he wrote and published the first three of over forty book across his career: Extinct Animals (1971), The Naturalist in London (1975) and Nature in the City (1976).

In the 1970s Burton became increasingly involved in international conservationism, becoming a consultant for Friends of the Earth in 1970, and being appointed CEO of the Fauna Preservation Society (FPS, now Fauna & Flora) in 1975 and founding director of the TRAFFIC conservation program the following year, with support from the International Union for Conservation of Nature (IUCN). That year, Burton hired an assistant named Vivienne Gledhill to work at the FPS, but she shortly quit and took a job at the Slimbridge Wetland Centre (now WWT Slimbridge), as an assistant to the British conservationist and ornithologist Peter Scott. They two reunited at an international conference in Kilaguni, Kenya some time later and wed in 1980. In 1987, he resigned as chief executive of the FPS and with his wife began organizing the Programme for Belize, which would later evolve into the WLT.

=== World Land Trust ===
The Programme for Belize began at the request of Gerard Bertrand, then director of the non-profit Massachusetts Audubon Society. Bertrand was interested in protecting migratory birds which summered in New England, particularly their wintering grounds in the rainforests of Belize. He approached the Burtons with a fundraising campaign to grow a $15,000 initial investment to $50,000 by 1988. The couple, now working collaboratively as conservationists, developed the grassroots "buy an acre" concept in conservation land trusts for the campaign, which allowed small-scale donors to see a tangible result of their donations. The strategy proved immensely successful, and the couple raised over $250,000 in the span of just six weeks, and the project was spun off into a permanent non-profit called Worldwide Land Conservation Trust which changed shortly thereafter to its current name, the World Land Trust.

Burton was an effective marketer, and quickly diversified the WLT's outreach efforts. At the time they owned the first fax machine in Suffolk, which they used to coordinate a marketing campaign. Burton took a regular column at Today Newspaper in order to promote the fledgling group, and embarked on public appearances such as British TV series such as Animal Magic with the actor and television presented Johnny Morris. They quickly secured the endorsement of famous conservationist figures including David Attenborough, Chris Packham, Bill Oddie, the actress Daryl Hannah, and the author Gerald Durrell, who presided over their opening ceremony at the popular London Butterfly House in Syon Park, West London.

Today the WLT has assisted in the securing of over 1 million hectares in conservation trusts in over 30 countries. The presiding philosophy of the organization is to maintain local control over these trusts, thus WLT itself does not own or manage any of this land directly.

=== Bat Conservation Trust ===
Burton played a significant role at the 1979 Bern Convention, where he acted as the primary lobbyist for the involved conservation NGOs. The momentum from this meeting led to the Wildlife and Countryside Act 1981, which among other conservation victories made bats the most well-protected wildlife in the United Kingdom. Later, in 1989 when bat conservation was facing a decline of support, Burton convened a meeting of involved figures and organizations at the Natural History Museum. The symposium agreed on a unified plan for bat conservation, including to charter the Bat Conservation Trust later in 1990, of which Burton served as founding chairman and later vice president, in 1996.

== Personal life ==
Burton married Vivianne Burton (née Gledhill) in 1980. A staunch antinatalist, the couple did not have children but instead chose to adopt a young girl, Lola, from their neighbours, who were known to have a problematic and unstable home. He was an avid reader and played the viola and tuba, participating in an amateur oompah band. Burton believed that veganism is not realistic from a conservationist view, but advocated for reduced meat and dairy. He described himself as a "largely vegetarian omnivore".

== Awards ==
In 2005, Burton was appointed a Visiting Fellow in the Department of Biology at the University of East Anglia. This appointment was in conjunction with the universty's offering of a Diploma in Conservation and Project Administration, which ran from 2005 to 2010.

In 2018, as part of the Gaj Mahotsav Elephant Festival in Delhi, India on World Elephant Day, Burton and his wife received a Lifetime Achievement award from the Indian government's Ministry of Environment, Forests and Climate Change for their contributions to the protection of Indian elephants in conjunction with the Wildlife Trust of India, a WLT partner.

In 2019 he was awarded the John Spedan Lewis Medal by the Linnean Society of London, of which he had been a highly active member and a Fellow since around 1977.

== Works ==
Bibliography
- Burton, John A. (1971). Extinct Animals. London: Transworld.
- Burton, John A. (1973). Birds of the Tropics. London: Orbis.
- Burton, John A. (1974). Fossils. London: Transworld.
- Burton, John A. (1975). The Naturalist in London. Newton Abbot: David & Charles.
- Burton, John A. (contributor) (1975). The Second Birdwatchers' Book. Newton Abbot: D & C.
- Burton, John A. (1976). Nature in the City. Danbury Press.
- Burton, John A., and B. Risden (1976). The Love of Birds. London: Octopus.
- Burton, John A. (contributor) (1976). Wilderness Europe. London: Time-Life Books.
- Burton, John A. (ed.) (1976). Owls of the World. London: Peter Low.
- Burton, John A. (1977). Musical Instruments from Odds and Ends. London: Carousel.
- Burton, John A. (contributor) (1977). The World of Wildlife. London: Hamlyn.
- Burton, John A. (1978). Rare Animals. London: Transworld.
- Arnold, E. N., and John A. Burton (1978). Field Guide to the Amphibians and Reptiles of Europe. London: Collins.
- Burton, John A. (contributor) (1978). Recent Advances in Primatology. London: Academic Press.
- Burton, John A. (1980). Gem Guide to Wild Animals. London: Collins.
- Burton, John A. (1982). Guinness Book of Mammals. London: Guinness.
- Burton, John A. (contributor) (1982). Encyclopedia of the Animal Kingdom. London: Optimum Books.
- Burton, John A. (1984). Gem Guide to Zoo Animals. London: Collins.
- Burton, John A. (ed.) (1984). National Trust Book of Wild Animals. London: Cape.
- Burton, John A. (ed.) (1984). Owls of the World (2nd ed.). London: Peter Low.
- Burton, John A. (1987). Collins Guide to Rare Mammals of the World. London: Collins.
- Scott, P., John A. Burton, and R. Fitter (1987). Red Data Books: The Historical Background. IUCN/NEP.
- Burton, John A. (1988). Close to Extinction. London: Franklin Watts.
- Burton, John A. (consultant) (1988). Killing for Luxury. London: Franklin Watts.
- Burton, John A. (consultant) (1988). Wild Britain. London: Ebury Press.
- Burton, John A. (1989). Mammals of America. New York: Archcape Press.
- Burton, John A. (contributor) (1990). The Guinness Encyclopedia. Enfield: Guinness Publishing.
- Salvadori, F. B. (1990). Rare Animals of the World. Edited by John A. Burton. New York: Mallard Press.
- Burton, John A. (1991). Close to Extinction (2nd, revised ed.). London: Franklin Watts.
- Burton, John A. (1991). Field Guide to the Mammals of Europe. London: Kingfisher.
- Burton, John A. (1991). The Pocket Guide to Mammals of North America. London: Dragon's World.
- Burton, John A. (contributor) (1991). Animal Life. New York: OUP.
- Burton, John A. (contributor) (1991). The Global Zoo. Amsterdam: Time-Life Books.
- Burton, John A. (ed.) (1991). The Atlas of Endangered Species. New York: Macmillan.
- Burton, John A. (1992). Snakes: An Illustrated Guide. London: Blandford.
- Burton, John A. (ed.) (1992). Owls of the World (3rd, revised ed.). London: Peter Low.
- Burton, John A. (1993). Animals of the World. London: HarperCollins.
- Burton, John A. (consultant) (1994). Mammals. London: Dragon's World Children's Books.
- Burton, John A. (contributor) (1994). Reader's Digest Exploring the Secrets of Nature. Reader's Digest.
- Burton, John A. (coordinator) (1994). CITES Guide to Plants in Trade. Bristol: DoE.
- Burton, John A. (consultant) (1995). Wild Ireland. London: Sheldrake/Arum.
- Burton, John A. (1996). Jungles & Rainforests. London: Dragon's World.
- Harris, B. (1996). Oceans: A Fold Out Book. John A. Burton, consultant. Rand McNally.
- Harris, B. (1996). Rainforest: A Fold Out Book. John A. Burton, consultant. Rand McNally.
- Burton, John A. (1997). Gem Photographic Guide to European Wild Animals. London: Collins.
- Burton, John A. (1998). Collins Wild Guide: Wild Animals (Europe). London: HarperCollins.
- Burton, John A. (1998). Reptile. London: Dorling Kindersley.
- Langton, T. E., and J. A. Burton (1998). Amphibians & Reptiles: Conservation Management of Species & Habitats. Strasbourg: CoE.
- Burton, John A. (ed.) (1999). Atlas of Endangered Species (2nd ed.). New York: Macmillan.
- Burton, John A. (2002). Field Guide to the Mammals of Europe (2nd ed.). London: Kingfisher.
- Bertrand, G. A., John A. Burton, and Paul Sterry (2002). Guide to North American Wildlife. New York: HarperCollins.
- Burton, John A. et al. (eds.). Wildlife and Roads: The Ecological Impact. London: Imperial College Press.
- Burton, John A. (2002). Attracting Wildlife to Your Garden. London: New Holland.
- Burton, John A. (2005). The Ultimate Bird Feeder Handbook.
- Burton, John A. (2009). Gem Guide to Wild Animals (revised ed.).
- Burton, John A., Jonny Birks, and Don Jefferies (2018). "Was the Stone Marten Native to Britain?" British Wildlife. Totnes.
