= Desmond Hawkins =

British writer and radio personality (1908–1999)

Alexander Desmond Hawkins OBE (20 October 1908 – 6 May 1999), better known as Desmond Hawkins, was a British author, editor and radio personality who worked as a features producer for the BBC, particularly of nature programmes.

== Early life and education ==
Alexander Desmond Hawkins was born on 20 October 1908 at East Sheen, Surrey, and educated at Cranleigh School. On leaving school at 16, he entered the family ironmongery and electrical engineering business at Elephant and Castle as a "fourth-generation novice", continuing his education through voracious reading; by his early 20s, he was sufficiently established in freelance writing to leave the family business.

== Career ==
The political and artistic upheavals of the 1930s meant a proliferation of serious magazines. Hawkins wrote for Purpose, The Listener, Time & Tide and the New Statesman. He became literary editor of Purpose and of The New English Weekly, and T. S. Eliot made him fiction chronicler of his critical journal The Criterion. Before the Second World War Hawkins had edited two books and had published two novels, the first of which was The Times's novel of the week.

Hawkins also had programme ideas accepted by the BBC and 1936 saw his first appearance in Radio Times with a programme called A Nest of Singing Birds – an anthology he compiled of English poets on English birds. Working extensively for the BBC as a freelance, particularly on the Sunday programme Country Magazine and on the daily War Report, he was asked to join the Corporation's staff in Bristol in 1945 and soon became a features (i.e. documentary) producer. Hawkins took the West Country to his heart and saw that among the assets of the region was the countryside and the wildlife. Having had a lifelong love of birds and nature, it was decided he should try and develop programmes of this type.

What followed eventually became the BBC Natural History Unit, having its origins in radio early in 1946 when Hawkins designed a programme called The Naturalist, with the curlew's song as a signature tune. This was followed by Birds In Britain, Birdsong of the Month and many more. Early in the 1950s, when television became able to attract a national audience, Hawkins went to Lime Grove to learn the new trade, and with Peter Scott planned the long-running series of wildlife programmes, which Hawkins named Look, because he felt television was about the opportunity to "look".

In 1955, Hawkins became Head of Programmes in Bristol, and Frank Gillard was promoted to be the West Region Controller. The two of them had enough clout in the BBC to establish in a formal sense in 1957 a specialist unit in the West Region to provide wildlife programmes for the national network – the Natural History Unit.

As well as developing wildlife programmes for radio and television, Hawkins dramatised five of Thomas Hardy's major novels as serials and enlarged Hardy's global impact. His version of The Return of the Native won the Society of Authors Radio Award for the best dramatisation of 1976. In 1978 he dramatised The Woodlanders to commemorate the 50th anniversary of Hardy's death, and this again won the award for the year's best dramatisation.

In May 1982, Hawkins was the guest for BBC Radio 4's Desert Island Discs. His choices included Beethoven's Cello Sonata No. 3 in A major, Op. 6 and Polly Perkins recited by Dylan Thomas. His favourite choice was Schubert's Octet in F major

He died on 6 May 1999, the same day as Johnny Morris, the television personality he discovered while they both lived in the village of Aldbourne, Wiltshire.

== Honours ==
- Silver Medal of the Royal Society for the Protection of Birds 1959 and Fellow in 1987
- Officer of the Order of the British Empire (OBE) in the 1963 Birthday Honours
- Honorary Doctor of Laws, University of Bristol 1974
- Fellow of the Royal Society of Literature 1977
- In 1998 he was given a Wildscreen Panda award in Bristol in recognition of his achievement in creating a media industry.

== Personal life ==
In 1934, Hawkins married Barbara Skidmore, with whom he had two sons and two daughters.

== Bibliography ==
- Hawk Among the Sparrows (Knopf, 1939)
- BBC War Report (Oxford University Press, 1946)
- Thomas Hardy (Barker, 1950) - English novelists series
- The BBC Naturalist (Rathbone Books, 1957)
- Hardy the Novelist (David & Charles, 1965) - New edition of 1950 title
- Wildlife of the New Forest (Russell & Co., 1972)
- Avalon & Sedgemoor (David & Charles, 1973)
- Hardy: Novelist & Poet (David & Charles, 1976)
- Cranborne Chase (Gollancz, 1980)
- Concerning Agnes (Alan Sutton, 1982)
- Hardy's Wessex (Macmillan, 1983)
- The Tess Opera (Hardy Society, 1985)
- When I Was (Macmillan, 1989) - Autobiography
- Hardy at Home (Barrie & Jenkins, 1989)
- Thomas Hardy: His Life and Landscape (National Trust, 1990)
- Shelley's First Love (Kyle Cathie Limited, 1992)
- Dorset Bedside Book (Dovecote Press, 1996)
- The Grove Diaries (Dovecote Press, 1995)
- Pilfold: The Life and Times of Captain John Pilfold CB RN (Horsham Museum Society, 1998)

== Sources ==
- Desmond's own chronicled career notes left with his daughter, Teresa Donovan, for use and interest after his death (unpublished)
- A "Radio Times" article by Desmond published 21 March 1968
- Desmond's autobiography "When I Was" as above
- The Obituaries from "The Times" on 13 May 1999
- "The Independent Weekend Review" on 8 May 1999
- The Royal Society of Literature 2000 Magazine
