= Wildscreen =

English wildlife conservation charity

- Founded: December 1987
- Founder: Sir Peter Scott; Christopher Parsons
- Type: Registered charity
- Registration no.: 299450
- Location: Bristol, England
- Region served: Global
- Key people: Lucie Muir (Director)
- Website: wildscreen.org

Wildscreen is a wildlife conservation charity based in Bristol, England.

The charity was founded in December 1987 from a trust which had operated since 1982, with the initial aim of encouraging and applauding excellence in the production of natural history films and television. The founders included Sir Peter Scott and Christopher Parsons OBE, former Head of the BBC Natural History Unit.

== Wildscreen Film Festival ==
Wildscreen Festival
- Location: Bristol, England
- Founded: 1982
- Awards: Wildscreen Panda Awards Wildscreen Official Selection
- Hosted by: Wildscreen
- Website: wildscreen.org/festival

The Wildscreen Festival is the world's leading international festival about nature films. It is held biennially in October in Bristol, England.

The festival began in 1982. In 1994, it merged with a biennial wildlife symposium, previously held in the neighbouring city of Bath. At Wildscreen Festival wildlife filmmakers and broadcasters from different parts of the world met to view the latest productions, discuss issues of mutual interest, exchange ideas and compete for the Panda Awards.

Over the years since then the festival has significantly expanded its scale and content and the charity has also enlarged its remit, including the launch of international festivals, Science is Storytelling, WildPhotos, and Wildscreen ARK (Formerly Arkive).

=== Wildscreen Festival 2024 ===
The most recent festival took place on 14–18 October 2024. In its 42nd year, the fully hybrid event celebrated and advanced natural world storytelling.

The festival included a range of programmed events, including, Masterclasses, Discussion Panels, Headline speakers, Workshops, Kit Show, Networking, Screenings. Along with Wildpitch, Official Selection, and the Panda Awards.

The Panda Awards included two new categories; the Children's Award sponsored by Wildscreen ARK, an online nature inspiration hub for young people. Additionally a there was a Special Recognition Award for Field Craft, which highlighted the essential role of local in-country field crew within the natural history genre.

For the Official Selection included three special awards, the Programmer Prize, Audience Prize and Sustainable Merit.

=== Wildscreen Festival Nairobi 2023 ===
Wildscreen Festival Nairobi was their first outside-of-UK festival, in Nairobi, Africa. The two-day event in July 2023 brought talent and storytellers from around the world to Kenya's capital, as part of the organisation's mission to help create a more inclusive industry.

=== Wildscreen Festival Tanzania 2024 ===
Continuing from the success of Wildscreen Festival Nairobi 2023, the second instalment of Wildscreens presence in Africa culminated in Wildscreen Festival Tanzania, held in Arusha June 2024. The festival programme included workshops, masterclasses, networking, and WildPitch Tanzania.

=== Wildscreen Festival 2020 ===
In preparation for the 2020 edition of the festival, Wildscreen announced the launch of the newly revamped Panda Awards, the highest honour in the global wildlife and environmental film industry. The 2020 festival also featured Official Selection screenings and a new award to recognise best practice in sustainable production. David Allen, multi award-winning filmmaker, was also announced as Final Jury Chair.

For 2020, the Panda Awards recognised talent in the following categories; Cinematography, Editing, Emerging Talent (in both film and photography), Music, Photo Story, Producer/Director, Production Team, Scripted Narrative, Series and Sound. There was also a new Sustainable Production award.

To recognise the broad range of talent and creative storytellers, Wildscreen introduced an Official Selection competition for 2020.

== Other initiatives and events ==
=== WildPhotos 2024 ===
Taking place in October 2024, WildPhotos was a one-day hybrid event held in Bristol, celebrating some of the world's best wildlife photographers. Wildscreen partnered with the Natural History Museum, London's Wildlife Photographer of the Year to host this photography symposium.

=== Science in Storytelling 2024 ===
Taking place in Bristol, the new one day annual event launched in March 2024. The day included a series of discussion panels, Q&A's, talks and networking, and brought together a diverse community of scientists and storytellers.

=== Wildscreen ARK (Formerly ARKive) ===
Wildscreen ARK (https://wildscreenark.org/) is the newest version of ARKive, a project created by Christopher Parsons, a founding member of the BBC Natural History Unit and the Wildscreen charity. Arkive was used by over a million people around the world each month. ARKive was retired in 2019.

The new nature education platform, Wildscreen ARK, was launched in February 2024. It has been designed to connect and engage teenagers with nature and the natural world, utilizing UK nature video and photo content alongside educational resources. During the first year of the project, a local Youth Film and Photography Competition was launched for young people from the West of England region, in collaboration with the West of England Combined Authority.

=== Wildscreen Exchange ===
In May 2015 Wildscreen launched Wildscreen Exchange. This conservation initiative provides conservation organisations with access to images, videos and expertise. Wildscreen Exchange contains over 28,000 images and many hours of video that are being used all over the world for campaigns, education resources, community outreach, fundraising and online.

== Management ==
Wildscreen is a registered charity under English law, governed by a board of 10 independent trustees, chaired by Laura Marshall, co-founder and CEO of Icon Films. The chief executive is Lucie Muir, appointed in 2015.

Wildscreen is a founder member of the Bristol Natural History Consortium, set up in 2004.

== Patrons ==
- HRH Prince Philip, Duke of Edinburgh
- David Attenborough, Naturalist, broadcaster
- Dr Sylvia Earle, Oceanographer
- Professor E. O. Wilson, Harvard University
- Dr George McGavin, Oxford University
