= World Land Trust =

British registered charity

- Founded: 1989
- Founders: John Burton; Gerard Bertrand
- Type: registered charity
- Registration no.: 1001291
- Location: Halesworth, Suffolk, United Kingdom
- Region served: worldwide
- Key people: Catherine Barnard, CEO
- Revenue: £10 million (2023)
- Website: worldlandtrust.org

World Land Trust is a UK registered charity. Acting on its tagline of "Saving Land, Saving Species", the trust raises money to buy and then protect environmentally-threatened land, and therefore species, in Africa, Asia, and Central and South America. Since 1989, 1.1 million ha have been directly saved across all WLT programmes. A further 1.3 million ha have been co-funded by WLT. At the time of writing, 2,361,353 ha have been protected by WLT partners in all and 11,452,226 ha have been connected by WLT-funded corridors and extensions.

== History ==
The trust was founded in 1989 as the Programme for Belize to raise money to privately buy land in Belize to protect tropical rain forests in collaboration with Massachusetts Audubon Society. The organisation later changed its name to the World Wide Land Conservation Trust, and then to World Land Trust. John Burton was chief executive for thirty years until 2019, when Catherine Barnard took over.

The Trust has since developed to help purchase and conserve land in 30 countries worldwide and had an annual income of £10 million in 2023.

The patrons of the trust are Sir David Attenborough, Steve Backshall, Chris Packham, and David Gower. Supporters include Bill Oddie, Tony Hawks, Mark Carwardine and Nick Baker.

== Projects ==
Projects include:

- purchase since 2007 of Atlantic forest in Brazil to expand the Reserva Ecológica Guapiaçu, with the British and Irish Association of Zoos and Aquariums
- purchase of land now incorporated into the Buenaventura Reserve, working with Fundacion de Conservacion Jocotoco
- acquisition of about 190 ha (470 acres) of Chocó rainforest at the Las Tangaras Bird Reserve and protect the golden poison frog (Phyllobates terribilis) at the Rana Terribilis Amphibian Reserve in Colombia, with Fundación ProAves; £50,000 raised by Steve Backshall
- establishment of Indian elephant corridors in India, working with the International Fund for Animal Welfare, the IUCN National Committee of the Netherlands, Elephant Family and Wildlife Trust of India.
- research in Iran on the Iranian subspecies of cheetah, with the Iranian Cheetah Society.
- raising £1 million to purchase land to connect two protected areas of rainforest and create an Orangutan corridor in Malaysian Borneo, with LEAP and Hutan
- purchase of land at Sierra Gorda in Mexico, with Grupo Ecológico Sierra Gorda
- implementation of a REDD+ project in the Atlantic Forest of Paraguay with Guyra Paraguay
- establishment of the Philippine Reef & Rainforest Project on Danjugan Island
- Kites Hill Reserve, Gloucestershire, United Kingdom, which was donated to the Trust and is managed as a nature reserve
- Jungle for Jaguars campaign to raise £600,000 for Corozal Sustainable Future Initiative to purchase and protect 33 km^{2} (13 mi^{2}) in Belize
- management of the conservatory Wyld Court (now The Living Rainforest) - a tropical forest exhibit, in Hampstead Norreys.
