= BBC Studios Natural History Unit =

British Broadcasting Corporation department

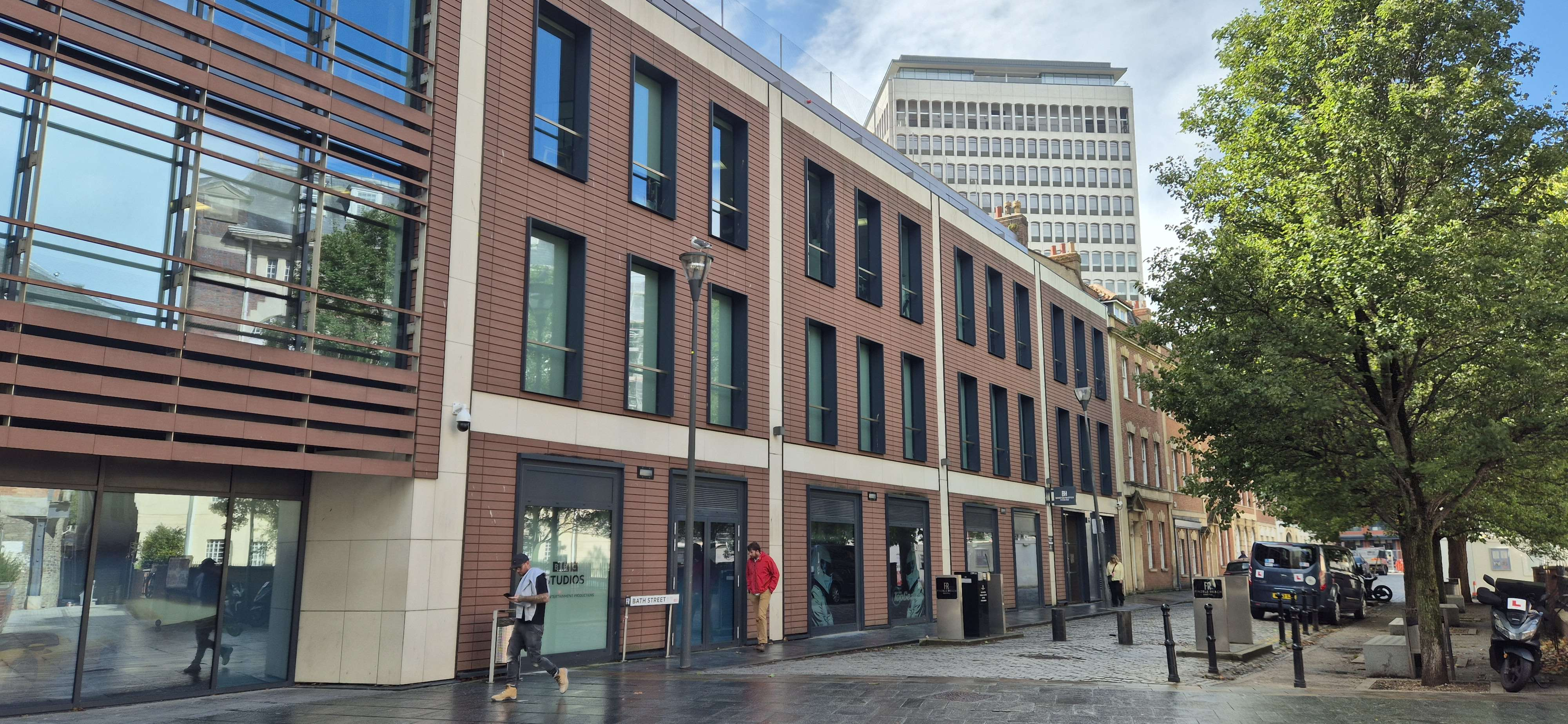
- Headquarters at Bridgewater House, Bristol
- Type: Division
- Industry: Mass media; Production company
- Founded: 1957; 69 years ago
- Headquarters: Bridgewater House, Bristol, United Kingdom
- Products: BBC Studios Natural History Unit filmography
- Parent: BBC Studios Productions

The BBC Studios Natural History Unit (NHU) is a department of BBC Studios that produces television, radio and online content with a natural history or wildlife theme. It is best known for its highly regarded nature documentaries, including The Blue Planet and Planet Earth, and has a long association with David Attenborough's authored documentaries, starting with 1979's Life on Earth.

The Natural History Unit is a specialist department within BBC Studios Productions. Each year it produces around 100 hours of television and 50 hours of radio programmes, making it the largest wildlife documentary production house in the world. The BBC commissions programmes from the Unit for broadcast on five terrestrial television channels (BBC One, BBC Two, BBC Four, CBBC and CBeebies) and BBC Radio 4. It also makes programmes for other broadcasters and services including Apple TV+, Warner Bros. Discovery, National Geographic Global Networks and NBC Universal. Content is marketed internationally under the BBC Earth brand. Original content is also broadcast on the Earth Unplugged YouTube channel.

The Unit was based in Broadcasting House, Bristol since its formation in 1957 until 2022, in 2022 it moved to Bridgewater House, along with BBC Studios Factual Entertainment Productions. It has been headed by Jonny Keeling since 2021.

== History ==
=== First steps in natural history broadcasting ===
Former BBC Studios Natural History Unit logo.

The BBC natural history unit's links to Bristol date back to the 1940s, when Desmond Hawkins, then a young producer, joined the West Region staff. His personal interest in the subject led to a radio series called The Naturalist, which began on the Home Service in 1946 and proved an immediate success, later augmented by Out of Doors and Birds in Britain.

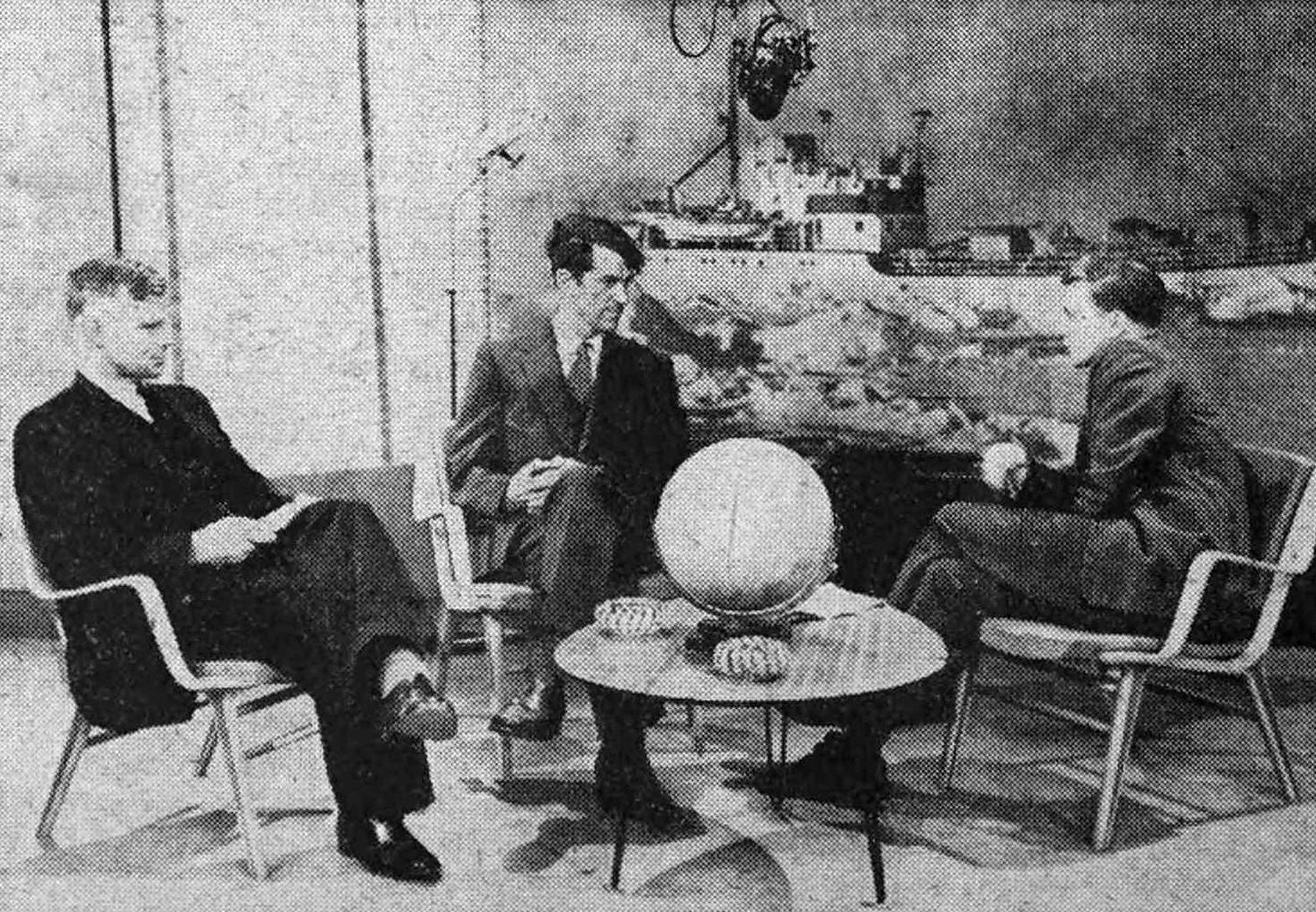
David Attenborough (right) interviewing explorers Vivian Fuchs (left) and Edmund Hillary (centre) in 1956.

By the early 1950s, Hawkins had been promoted to Head of Programmes, West Region and was keen to translate his success to the developing medium of television. At the time, radio still commanded much higher audiences than the fledgling television service, but Hawkins was not alone in recognising the potential for natural history programmes for the newer medium. His vision was shared by Frank Gillard, the regional Head, and the two men would become the driving force behind the establishment of the Natural History Unit (NHU) in Bristol.

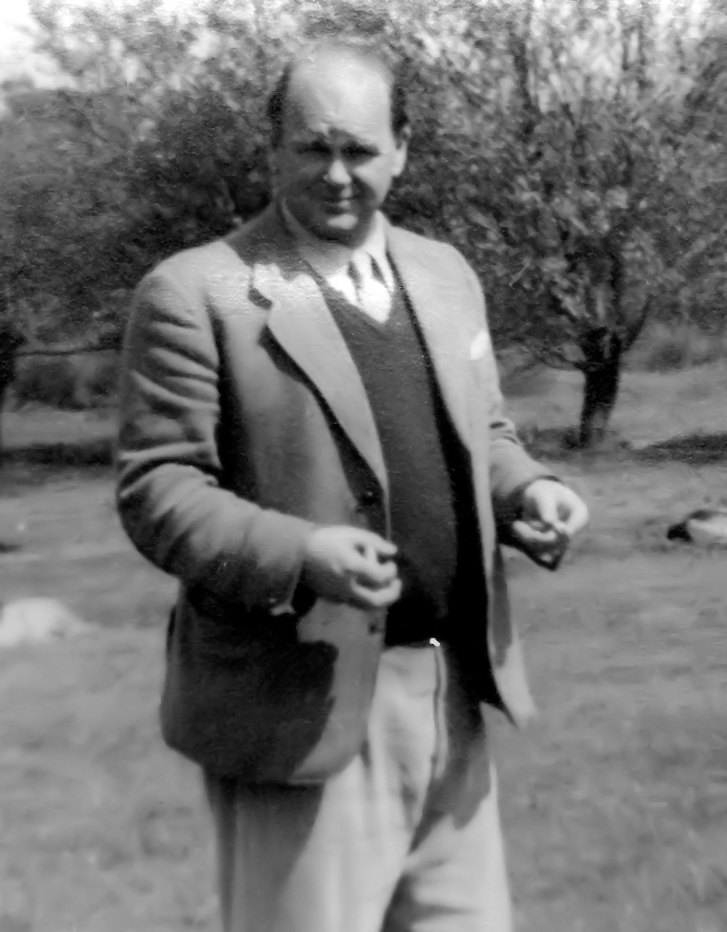
Peter Scott, an early presenter of BBC nature programmes

Until such formalities were completed, natural history programmes were the responsibility of the Features office of the West Region. One of the first programmes was an outside broadcast from the Wildfowl and Wetlands Trust's centre at Slimbridge in 1953, the first TV collaboration between the BBC and Peter Scott. Occasional programmes continued the following year, but it was not until 1955 that the BBC began a regular studio-based series, Look, presented by Scott.

One of the early problems for the Unit was the difficulty in sourcing film stock. At the time, the only wildlife cameramen were amateurs, and the footage wasn't always good enough for broadcast. The embryo unit's first film camera, a clockwork Bolex, was bought from a Bristol camera shop with petty cash by Desmond's assistant, Tony Soper. Some of Scott's own expedition films were used for early episodes of Look. One particularly outstanding film from 1955, shot by Heinz Sielmann, showed woodpeckers inside a nest hole.

=== Unit formation ===
By 1957, with Look firmly established and Gillard and Hawkins lobbying hard, the BBC management in London approved the official formation of a Natural History Unit. Gillard was on the search for a senior producer to head the new Unit, and asked David Attenborough to take on the role. Attenborough had good credentials (he was a trained zoologist) but declined, having recently settled in London with his young family. Instead, he was placed in charge of the newly formed Travel and Exploration Unit, striking a deal which would allow him to continue to film his popular Zoo Quest (1954–1963) series alongside natural history output from the fledgling Bristol unit. The Travel and Exploration Unit in London also introduced viewers to more exotic wildlife, and made household names of the first natural history presenters. Armand and Michaela Denis filmed East African wildlife for their On Safari programmes, whilst another pioneering husband-and-wife team, Hans and Lotte Hass, created some of the first underwater films.

Nicholas Crocker, a senior producer with West Region, became the Unit's first Head in September 1957. Founder members included Tony Soper (producer) and Christopher Parsons (assistant film editor), both of whom would go on to play a major part in the Unit's development.

Although much of the Unit's early output concentrated on British and European wildlife, one of its first productions to be broadcast was Faraway Look featuring Peter Scott in Australia. The early programmes were limited by the available technology, but it was also a time of great experimentation in style and content, bringing the Unit notable success. Animal Magic (1962–1983), presented by Johnny Morris and Tony Soper, was a successful format for young audiences which ran for over 20 years. The Unit also collaborated with Gerald Durrell on several films of his animal-collecting expeditions, beginning with the studio-based series To Bafut for Beef (April 1958), using African footage shot by Durrell.

=== Colour television arrives ===
In the early 1960s, natural history filmmaking was being held back by the limitations of the available technology, particularly the restrictions of shooting often fast-moving subjects in poor light and spectacularly colourful subjects in black and white. The second of these problems was about to be resolved.

Around the same time, the technology to broadcast and receive colour television was being developed, and the BBC made funds available to begin filming in colour to allow filmmakers to experiment with the latest equipment in preparation for the switchover. The Major (1963), produced by Parsons and filmed largely by New Forest cameraman Eric Ashby, told the story of an ancient English oak and was the Unit's first colour production. This was one of six films made for the BBC by part-time film-makers Ron Peggs and Leslie Jackman. Leslie filmed the insect sequences at his home in Paignton using specimens collected by John Burton.

Colour transmission finally arrived in 1967 on BBC 2 under the stewardship of David Attenborough, who had retired from programme-making to move into BBC administration. The first natural history film to be shown in colour was Ron Eastman's The Private Life of the Kingfisher (1968), written and produced by Jeffery Boswall.

Attenborough, by then controller of BBC 2, wanted to make a strong statement on BBC's second channel of the boundless possibilities that colour television offered, and recognised that natural history was the obvious subject matter to choose. He commissioned a series called The World About Us (1969–1982) that would broadcast in a 50-minute Sunday evening slot. Because of the challenge of producing enough colour material, the commission was shared between the NHU and London's Travel and Exploration Unit. The extended opportunities offered by the 50-minute format and improvements in film technology and expertise finally allowed the NHU to begin showcasing its talent.

=== Birth of the 'personal view' series ===
One of Attenborough's main achievements as Controller of BBC 2 was to commission Civilisation (1969), a major series presented by the respected art historian Kenneth Clark. It was a resounding success with critics and the public, pioneering the 'personal view' form of documentary films for television. Parsons, by then an experienced producer with the NHU, recognised the potential for a similar treatment with natural history as the subject and approached Attenborough in 1970 with the idea. Attenborough was receptive, even to the idea that he should present the series, but both men realised at that time that it was beyond the scope of the Unit's capabilities.

When Attenborough resigned from his administrative duties to return to programme making at the start of 1973, planning for the proposed series resumed. It was another three years before the resourcing and financing were agreed, the outline episode scripts written (by Attenborough) and a production team in place. Parsons would serve as series producer and share production duties for the individual episodes with Richard Brock and John Sparks. Filming took place in 39 countries, featured over 650 different species and involved over 1 million miles of travel. Attenborough himself has said that if it had not been for computerised airline schedules, the series would have probably been impossible to undertake. When it was finally broadcast in 1979 on BBC 1, Life on Earth drew an audience of 15 million people in the UK and was eventually seen by an estimated 500 million people worldwide.

=== Building on success ===
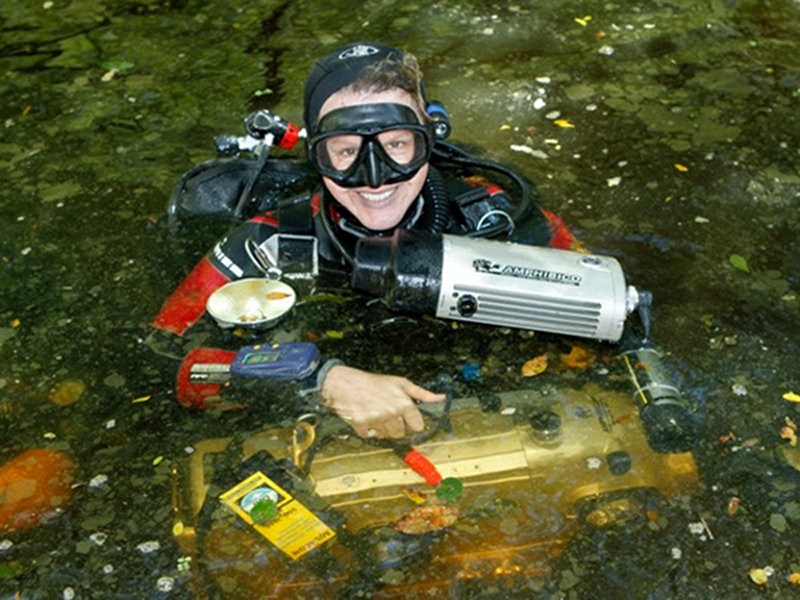
Diver Jill Heinerth filming for the BBC.

The Natural History Unit made its name with Life on Earth, and was rewarded by being awarded departmental status by BBC management in December 1979. Christopher Parsons, by then its most experienced producer, became the first official Head of the Unit. It celebrated its silver jubilee in 1982 with the miniseries Flight of the Condor, and sealed its reputation as one of the foremost production companies for popular natural history films in the following decades. A succession of series have followed the format established by Life on Earth, often presented or narrated by Attenborough, and transmitted on the BBC's main channel. The Blue Planet (2001) and Planet Earth (2006) typify these signature programmes, characterised by high production values, specially-commissioned musical scores and often ground-breaking footage of wildlife from around the globe.

The NHU has also diversified into other programme formats. Its Diary series have featured African big cats, elephants, orang-utans and bears in a nightly wildlife soap opera. Among of the longest-running programmes has been Wildlife on One (1977–2005) which was broadcast in a regular evening slot.

The Continents strand on BBC Two has featured series on all the world's major land areas over the past eighteen years, including Spirits of the Jaguar (1996), Land of the Tiger (1997), Andes to Amazon (2000) and Wild Down Under (2003). Also on BBC Two, the annual Springwatch (since 2005) and Autumnwatch (since 2006) series have brought live pictures of British wildlife into millions of homes.

=== 50 years of wildlife film making ===
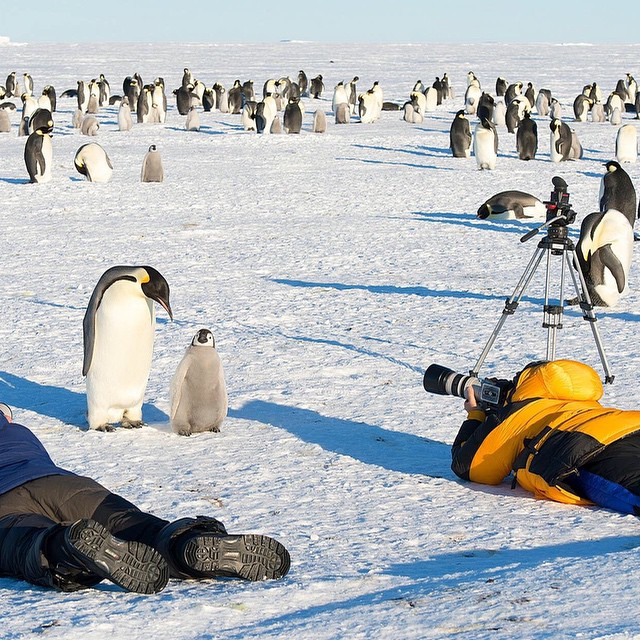
Camera operator Doug Allan filming penguins in Antarctica.

In 2007, the Unit celebrated its 50th anniversary and was rewarded with a special award at the International Broadcasting Convention in recognition of its unique contribution to wildlife film and documentary making.

On television, the anniversary was marked with the broadcast of Saving Planet Earth, a conservation-themed series which helped to raise over £1.5 million for the BBC Wildlife Fund.

In October 2007, the BBC announced that the NHU would suffer cuts of a third in both staff numbers and its £37 million annual budget, as a result of the Government's decision to impose a lower than inflation increase in the television licence fee. The cutbacks were widely condemned within the media industry and by programme-makers, including David Attenborough.

In response to the criticism, Keith Scholey, Factual Controller of BBC Vision, promised that the BBC would "continue to make and show the ambitious, large-scale, truly memorable series that audiences associate with BBC natural history output". Titles affected by the cuts include the BBC Two Wild strand.

Productions already underway were not affected by the cuts, so the following year came Wild China, Pacific Abyss, Lost Land of the Jaguar and Big Cat Live, as well as the Unit's most ambitious radio event to date, World on the Move. Natural World also received a three-year commission from BBC Two on its 25th anniversary.

=== Modern era ===
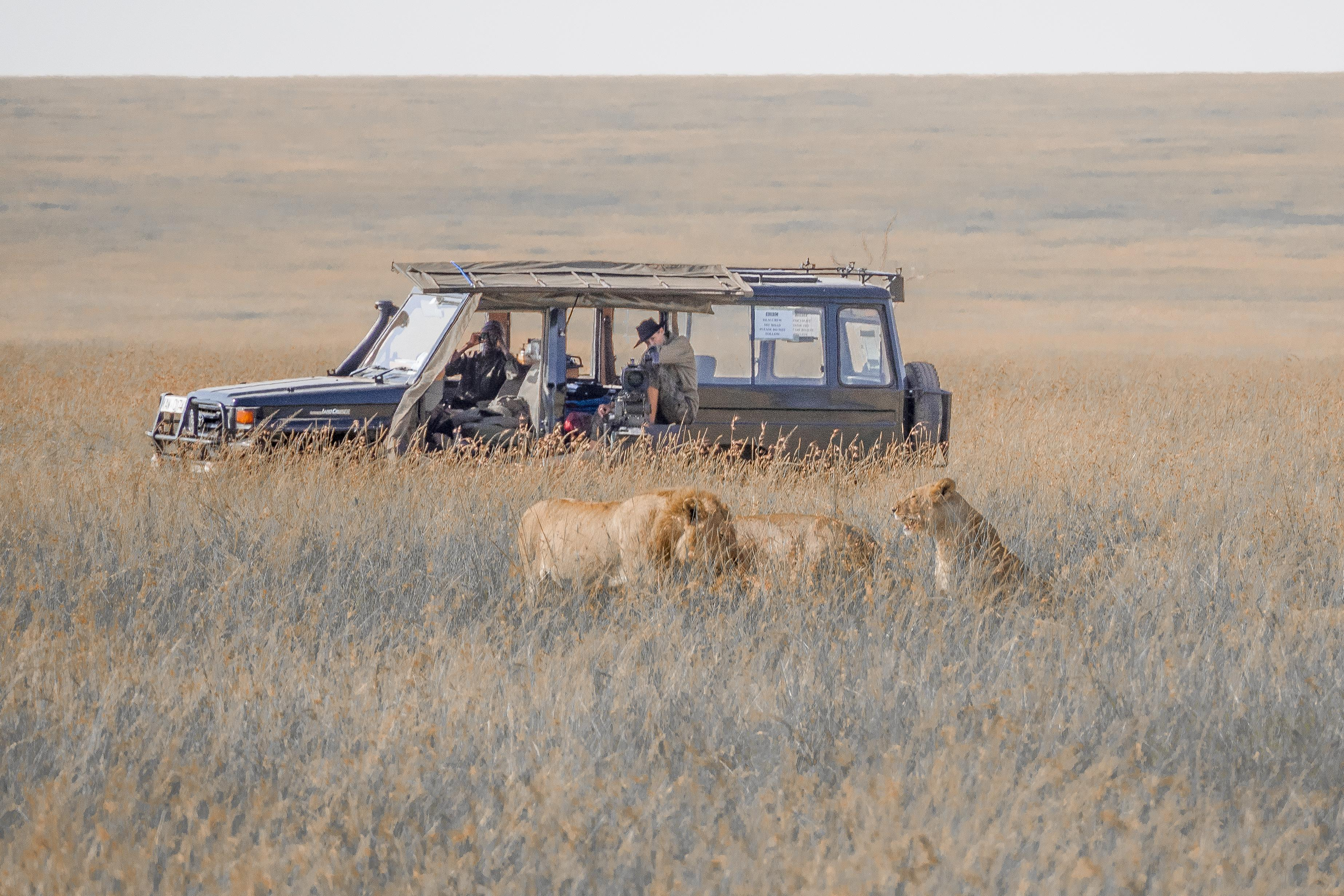
BBC staff filming lions at Maasai Mara, Kenya.

Post 2010, a greater emphasis was placed on climate change, which several special programmes broadcast focusing on the issue. More broadly, series looked at the negative effects of climate change and habitat destruction within series that did not focus solely on the topic.

In 2016, BBC's non-news content production, including natural history, was separated into a commercial subsidiary BBC Studios. NHU head Wendy Darke departed and was succeeded by Julian Hector.

== Filmography ==
Since its inception in the 1950s, the Natural History Unit has produced a wealth of material for television, radio, and more recently, cinema. Being the first and the largest production unit devoted to natural history programme making, it maintains an extensive archive of images and sound recordings as well as film materials. The filmography article presents a chronological summary of the Unit's major television and film productions.

=== In production ===
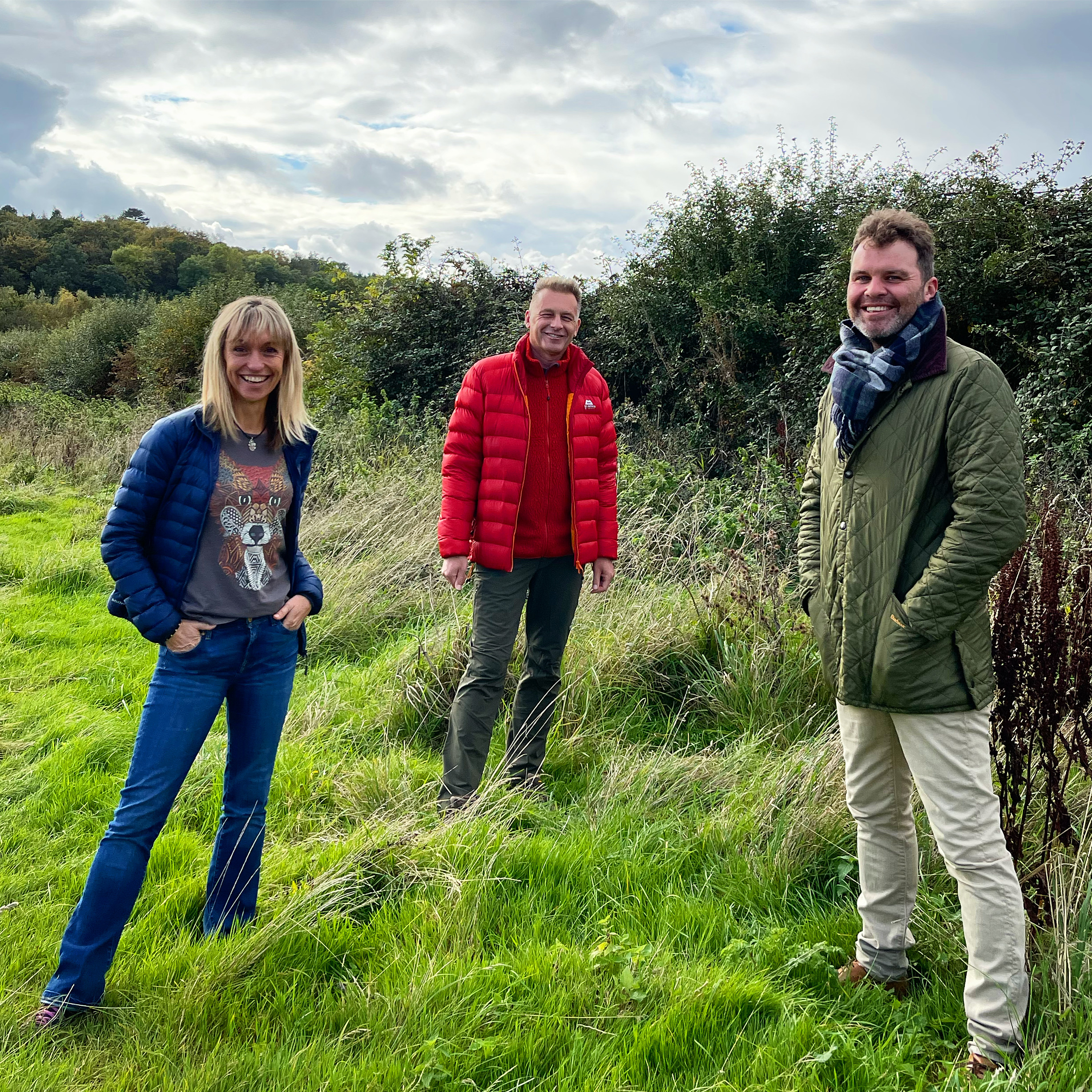
Springwatch production staff Michaela Strachan, Chris Packham and Andrew Waddison.

As well as returning series such as Springwatch and Autumnwatch and natural history content for BBC One's The One Show, the Unit has been commissioned to produce or co-produce the following announced titles:

- Our Changing Planet, a seven-year project documenting environmental change in six threatened ecosystems, co-produced by PBS. It launched in April 2022 on BBC One and BBC iPlayer in the UK and is due to conclude in 2028.
- Blue Planet III, a 6x60' series due for transmission on BBC One and BBC iPlayer in 2026.
- Hidden Planet, a 5x60' series co-produced by The Open University, for BBC One and BBC iPlayer.
- Home, produced for Disney+ and National Geographic and billed as "the most ambitious and definitive portrait of life on Earth ever attempted", with a planned 9 seasons spanning a decade. Transmission dates have yet to be announced.
- Lion, produced for Disney+ and National Geographic in conjunction with Jon Favreau. Transmission dates have yet to be announced.
- Matriarch will focus on the lives of female chimpanzees in Jane Goodall's study troop in Gombe, Tanzania. The two-part series is co-produced by PBS and the WNET Group. Transmission dates have yet to be announced.
- Tiger Island, a two-part series filmed in western Nepal, which has one of the highest concentrations of tigers on Earth.
- The Green Planet II, a follow-up to the original 2022 series which will explore in more detail the relationships between plants and animals.

== Awards and recognition ==
The Natural History Unit as a whole was awarded the Gold Medal at the 2001 Royal Television Society awards for its "outstanding contribution over the past 44 years to broadcasting about the natural world". It was praised for being "a national resource for people's understanding and love of wildlife on our planet, and a symbol of both quality and talent in public service broadcasting".

NHU filmmakers are regularly nominated and rewarded at film festivals such as Wildscreen, the Missoula International Wildlife Film Festival and the Jackson Hole Wildlife Film Festival and their output has been recognised by the wider broadcasting industry too, winning four Emmys, eleven BAFTAs, and the Prix Italia on three occasions.

Recognition has also come in the form of high audience viewing figures and audience approval ratings, particularly for 'blue-chip' series such as Planet Earth. When first screened in the UK it was watched by more than 8 million people. In 2008, episodes of Life in Cold Blood and the Wildlife Special miniseries Tiger: Spy in the Jungle both reportedly achieved the highest-ever audience appreciation index (AI) rating for a factual programme.

== New customers and audiences ==
Since launching commercially, the Natural History Unit has won commissions from international broadcasters including Apple TV+ (The Year Earth Changed and Prehistoric Planet), Discovery Channel (Endangered, narrated by Ellen DeGeneres), NBCUniversal (The Americas previously known as The New World), National Geographic (Ocean Xplorers in partnership with James Cameron), and PBS (Wild Scandinavia, narrated by Rebecca Ferguson), as well as producing for the BBC.

Content is marketed internationally under BBC Studios' BBC Earth brand. Original content is also broadcast on the BBC Earth YouTube channel.

== Staff ==
=== Heads ===
According to

- Nicholas Crocker (1957–1959)
- Bruce Campbell (1959–1962)
- Nicholas Crocker (1962–1973)
- Mick Rhodes (1973–1979)
- Christopher Parsons (1979–1983)
- John Sparks (1983–1988)
- Andrew Neal (1988–1992)
- Alastair Fothergill (1992–1998)
- Keith Scholey (1998–2003)
- Neil Nightingale (2003–2009)
- Andrew Jackson (2009–2012)
- Wendy Darke (2012–2016)
- Julian Hector (2016–2021)
- Jonny Keeling (2021–present)

=== Other ===
- Mary Colwell, BBC Natural History producer
- Richard Matthews, BBC Natural History wildlife filmmaker
- Mike Gunton, the Unit's first Creative Director

== Sources ==
- Parsons, C. (1982). True to Nature: Christopher Parsons looks back on 25 years of wildlife filming with the BBC Natural History Unit. Patrick Stephens Limited. ISBN 0-85059-530-4.
- Attenborough, David (2002). Life on Air: Memoirs of a Broadcaster. BBC Books. ISBN 0-563-48780-1.
- BBC/2 entertain Great Wildlife Moments DVD (2003). Bonus feature: Heads of the BBC Natural History Unit
