= Congo (TV series) =

- Series title card from UK broadcast
- Genre: Nature documentary
- Written by: Brian Leith
- Directed by: Brian Leith
- Narrated by: John Lynch
- Composer: Ben Salisbury
- Country of origin: United Kingdom
- Original language: English
- No. of episodes: 3

Production
- Executive producer: Neil Nightingale
- Producer: Brian Leith
- Running time: 50 minutes
- Production companies: Scorer Associates; BBC Natural History Unit; Discovery Channel

Original release
- Network: BBC Two
- Release: 30 January – 13 February 2001

Related
- Andes to Amazon; Wild Africa

Congo is a 2001 BBC nature documentary series for television on the natural history of the Congo River of Central Africa. In three episodes, the series explores the variety of animals and habitats that are to be found along the river's 4,700 km (2,922 mi) reach.

Congo was produced for the BBC Natural History Unit and the Discovery Channel by Scorer Associates. The series writer/producer was Brian Leith and the executive producer was Neil Nightingale. Series consultants were Michael Fay, Kate Abernethy, Jonathan Kingdon and Lee White.

Little filming was possible in the Democratic Republic of the Congo which encompasses the vast majority of the river's watershed. (The one exception to this is the brief sequence of Livingstone Falls.) The reason for this is that the Second Congo War (1998–2003) was underway during filming (1999–2000).

The series forms part of the Natural History Unit's Continents strand and was preceded by Andes to Amazon in 2000 and succeeded by Wild Africa later that year in 2001.

== Episodes ==
=== 1. "The River That Swallows All Rivers" ===
Formerly called the “Zaire” (Kongo nzere, "the river that swallows all rivers"), the Congo's origin is traced to the Chambeshi (discovered by Livingstone) in Zambia. The Kalambo River has one of Africa's highest waterfalls (250 meters) at the Zambia/Tanzania border. The Chambeshi contributes to the Bangweulu Swamp, home to both the black lechwe and the Bemba people. (Livingstone died there searching for the Nile source.) Other denizens include the oribi, tsessebe (relative of the gnu), African lungfish and the stork-like shoebill. The Luapula and Lualaba Rivers are followed, as is the Lake Tanganyika effluent river, the Lukuga. Tanganyika provides habitat for Limnocnida (freshwater jellyfish), the Bichir (a primitive fish), water cobra, the spotted-necked otter and diverse populations of cichlids. The abandoned "country estate" of Col. Stewart Gore-Browne (incorrectly called "Henry" in the series) – known as Shiwa Ngandu – is visited. It is in northern Zambia. The Congo's course is picked up again far downstream where it forms a part of the border between Republic of Congo and Democratic Republic of Congo. The wider river here hosts elephant-snout fish, north African catfish, and the water chevrotain. “Bais" (Biaka, "glades") provide habitat for elephant, hippo and the western lowland gorilla, which numbers as many as 50,000 within the Odzala National Park. River martins swarm massively. The Congo is so wide here that it forms an effective barrier between two related species of ape: the common chimp on the north bank and the bonobo (pygmy chimp) on the south. The sequence makes another huge jump here, to the Livingstone Falls just below Kinshasa. Finally, Gabon's Loango National Park is visited – the last place where large African animals may still be seen wild on a seashore.

=== 2. "Spirits of the Forest" ===
The Biaka (Bayaka) and Baka pygmies of the northern Congo Basin relate tales of the Mokèlé-mbèmbé, a legendary, dinosaur-like creature purportedly inhabiting the Lake Tele region of the Republic of the Congo (ROC). It is thought to feed on Landolphia, a type of liana. Other denizens of the ROC include moustached guenons, crowned guenons, red colobus monkeys, okapis and the blue duiker. Figs sustain great blue turacos, black mangabeys and various hornbills. The forests of Tanzania's Gombe National Park support common chimpanzees and the bais of Dzanga-Sangha National Park in the Central African Republic support numbers of forest elephant. Other Congolese inhabitants featured include red river hogs, bongos, forest buffalo, orb-web spiders and colonial spiders. Returning again to the ROC, the Biaka are seen to expertly craft Portuguese-style crossbows and arrows made from seven different kinds of wood and other plants. Gorillas are again viewed at the Odzala National Park.

=== 3. "Footprints in the Forest" ===
The Congo Basin is home to the largest number of non-human primates on earth, including three apes: gorillas, chimps and bonobos. At Nouabale-Ndoki National Park in the ROC, David Morgan investigates chimps in the "uncharted" wilderness of the Goualougo Triangle. Conservationist/ecologist Mike Fay studies the natural history of the Ndoki River and Sangha River regions, as well as Lake Tele, an even more remote area to the east. Families of western lowland gorillas are seen washing their food (a first) at Mbele Bai. Although uninhabited now, pottery shards on the banks of the Sangha attest to former human habitation, as do the 2,300- to 2,500-year-old oil palm nuts found nearby. Both gorillas and common chimps are contrasted unfavorably with bonobos: The latter are “new age” and "touchy-feely" apes. Moreover, because of their more amiable behavior, "feminists have taken bonobos to their hearts". As for the common chimps, they prowl like "teenage gangs" and "behave like thugs and villains". Unlike the bonobos, they kill other primates and one another, maybe even "for fun". It is speculated that the Congo Basin may be where humans originated – though no real evidence for this is presented. There are, however, thousands of petroglyphs (rock art) at Lopé in Gabon, to attest to early human habitation. Richard Oslisly, a French archeologist, believes he has found evidence of early "burn and chase" hunting at Lopé, a pattern which may explain the en masse migratory habits of mandrills in the local grasslands. The extraction of timber and bushmeat from this jungle area results in a continuous stream of traffic on the crude roads.

== Awards ==
The series won the 2002 Royal Television Society award in the science and natural history category.

== See also ==
- BBC Atlas of the Natural World, a 2006-07 DVD compilation series for North America
