= Wild Africa =

- Title card from "Savannah" episode
- Genre: Nature documentary
- Narrated by: Fergal Keane
- Composer: Christopher Gunning
- Country of origin: United Kingdom
- Original language: English
- No. of episodes: 6

Production
- Executive producer: Neil Nightingale
- Producer: Patrick Morris
- Running time: 50 minutes
- Production company: BBC Natural History Unit

Original release
- Network: BBC Two
- Release: 7 November – 12 December 2001

Related
- Congo; Wild New World

Wild Africa is a British nature documentary series created and produced by the BBC. It explores the natural history of the African continent. It was first transmitted on 7 November 2001 on BBC Two in the United Kingdom and comprises six episodes. Each concentrates on a particular environment. The producers use aerial photography and wildlife footage to show how natural phenomena such as seasonal changes influence the patterns of life. Wild Africa was produced by the BBC Natural History Unit and narrated by Fergal Keane.

The series forms part of the Natural History Unit's Continents strand. It was preceded by Congo earlier that year and followed a year later by Wild New World.

== Production ==
Wild Africa typifies the style of blue-chip documentary series on which the Natural History Unit has built its reputation, with its high production values, strong visuals and dedicated musical score. To achieve this took 18 months of principal photography on 53 filming trips to 22 countries, starting in September 1999. The filmmakers were assisted by a production team of 16 and around 140 scientists and field assistants. The experienced camera team included Peter Scoones, Gavin Thurston, Owen Newman, Martyn Colbeck and Simon King, all of whom have contributed to many other BBC natural history films.

The filming team travelled from the lowest point on the continent, the Danakil Depression in Ethiopia, to the highest, the summit of Kilimanjaro. Successes included rare footage of huge feeding groups of manta rays, and Walia ibex locking horns in the Simien Mountains.

== Episodes ==
Broadcast dates refer to the original UK transmission.

=== 1. "Mountains" ===
Broadcast 7 November 2001

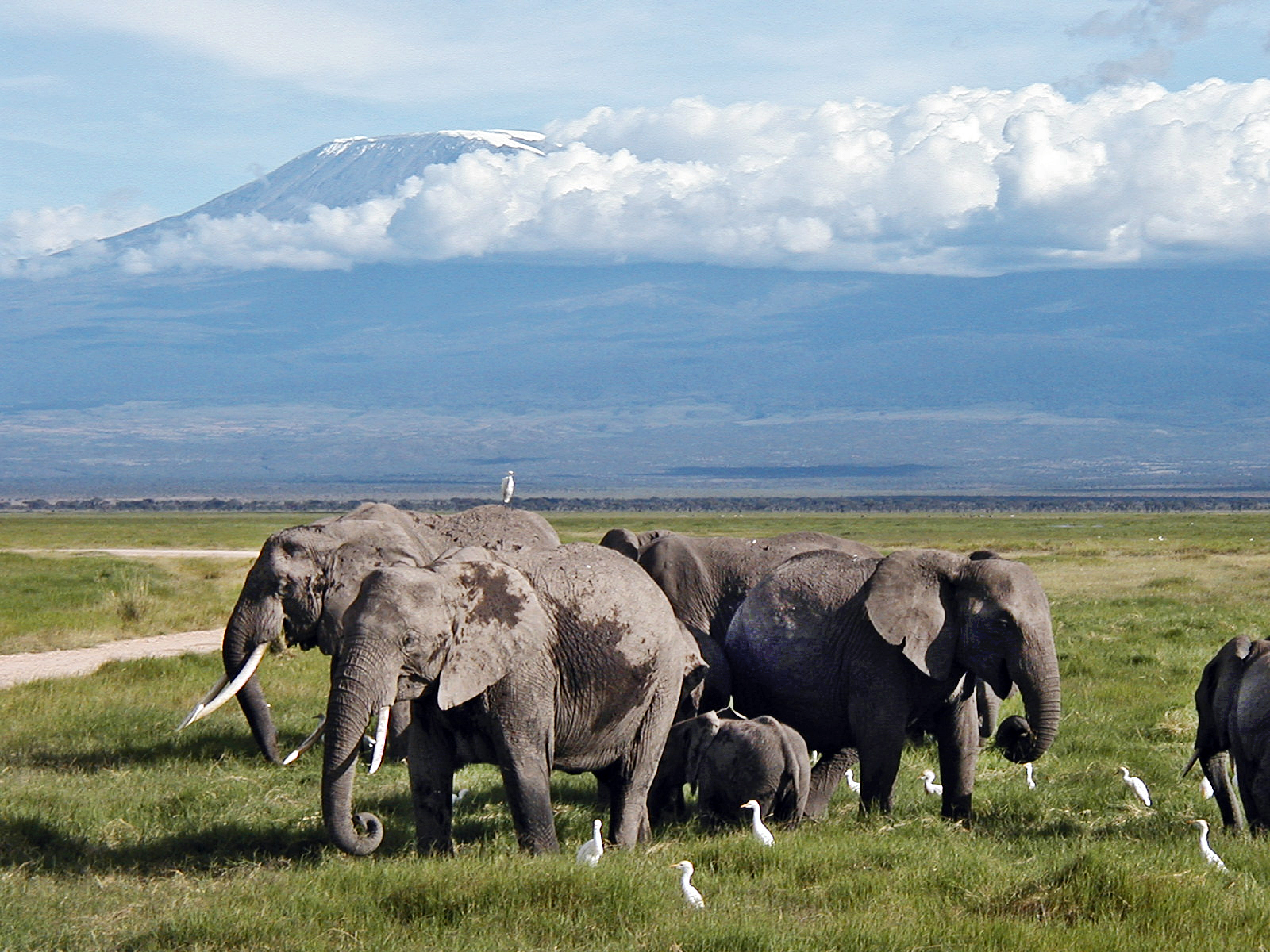
African elephants and Mount Kilimanjaro

After an opening sequence introducing the series, the first episode looks at Africa's mountain ranges. First to be featured are the Ethiopian Highlands, the remains of a huge volcanic intrusion. Geladas survive in large groups on the cold grassy highlands and use facial expressions to resolve tensions without confrontation. Walia ibex clash horns on precipitous slopes, and Ethiopian wolves stalk grass rats and giant mole-rats. A pair of adult lammergeiers locks talons and tumbles through the air. Juvenile birds are shown practising the art of dropping bones from great heights onto rocks. In North Africa, Barbary macaques are filmed foraging in a snow-covered cedar forest in the Atlas Mountains. The Cape Highlands are Africa's oldest mountains. Their isolation and stable climate have enabled an entire plant kingdom to evolve. Over 7000 species make up the Fynbos, and many have developed unique relationships with pollinating insects and birds. The Rift Mountains of East Africa are active volcanoes, but their lives are short in geological terms. A sequence shows mountains of increasing age, from Lengai and Kilimanjaro to Mount Kenya and finally the weathered remnants of the Aberdare Range. Their mineral-rich soils attract savannah animals including elephants and bushbucks. As the Rift Mountains have thrust upwards, they become an agent of evolutionary change as small populations of animals are isolated from their lowland relatives. Melanistic forms of servals and leopards arise mainly in the highlands. The programme ends in the heart of the continent, with scenes of mountain gorillas in the Virungas.

=== 2. "Savannah" ===
Broadcast 14 November 2001

The savannah, home to the greatest herds on Earth, is the subject of the second instalment. Despite its timeless appearance it is actually Africa's youngest landscape, shaped by the weather and the animals themselves. As the continent dried, rainforest trees dwindled and were replaced by swathes of open woodland, thickets and grassland. Elephants, drawn from the rainforests around three million years ago, are the greatest architects of the land and are filmed pushing over trees. Primates also moved into the savannah, beginning with the ancestors of modern baboons. Grass is a vital element of the ecosystem here. Grazing herds trim the grasses, promoting rigorous growth and more numerous varieties. Seasonal rains and fires also shape the environment of the savannah. After rainfall, the plentiful grass seed triggers a race to breed for millions of red-billed queleas. Marabou storks pick armyworms from the grass and quelea chicks from their nests. The dry season can last eight months, forcing many herbivores to migrate in search of water. Wildebeest follow the rains, while elephants travel a network of paths between waterholes. Buffalos rely on tough grasses to sustain them through the lean times, but as they weaken, lions sense an opportunity. Long, narration-free, slow-motion sequences of lion and cheetah hunts are accompanied by evocative orchestral music. Night-time cameras follow rarely seen animals including aardvarks, servals and an African wild cat. The reasons for this abundance of life are the savannah's vast size, fast recycling of nutrients and the adaptability of its wildlife.

=== 3. "Deserts" ===
Broadcast 21 November 2001

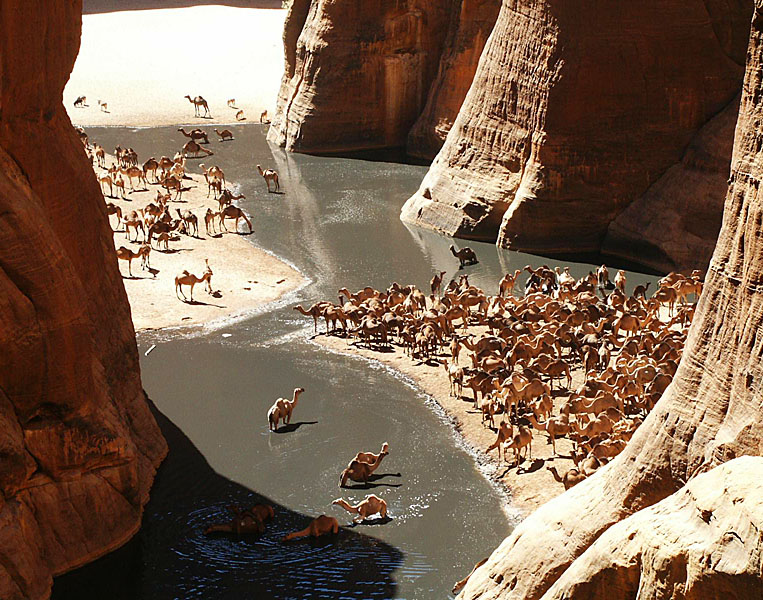
Camels in the Ennedi Gorge

The third programme features Africa's deserts, whose swathes of sand and rock cover half the continent. It begins in the Namib by demonstrating some of the unusual strategies that desert insects and spiders have evolved to survive. With no more than 5 cm of rain each year, this is Africa's driest desert. On warm nights, sea fog forms over the cold ocean and blows across the dunes, bringing vital, life-sustaining moisture. Even large animals can survive here; elephants use knowledge passed down through generations to find sustenance. Nara melons make a nutritious meal, and Cape porcupines and hairy-footed gerbils take advantage too. Neighbouring the Namib is the Karoo, which benefits from winter rains. The blossoming of flowering plants in the spring is shown using time-lapse. The rains also trigger the emergence of locusts, which swarm together and destroy all fresh growth in their path. In the Kalahari, there is enough rain for grasses and stunted trees to grow. The co-operative strategies of Damaraland mole-rats, meerkats and sociable weavers are compared. The grasses support grazing animals such as springbok, which in turn attract predators. The cheetah, with its thin, lightly furred body is most at home in the desert. The Sahara is much newer than Africa's southern deserts, the product of a rapidly drying climate coupled with overgrazing. Ancient rock art in Chad's Ennedi Plateau shows a vanished world – giraffe, elephant, rhino and other savannah creatures. Now, the last remaining Nile crocodiles share their dwindling pools with the passing camel trains.

=== 4. "Coasts" ===
Broadcast 28 November 2001

The fourth instalment follows an anticlockwise path around Africa's coastline, beginning at the Cape of Good Hope. To the east, the warm Indian Ocean brings moisture to the land. The coastal forests and mangroves are home to Zanzibar red colobus and mudskippers. Tree-climbing crabs feed on fresh mangrove leaves, but must descend to escape the midday sun. North of the Tropics, the Red Sea coast receives little rainfall due to the dry heat and intense evaporation. Corals thrive in the clear, warm waters and the reefs here harbour moray eels, redtoothed triggerfish and clownfish. Pelagic fish shown include barracuda, devil rays and a school of manta rays filmed feeding in formation in a Sudanese bay. On the Mediterranean coast, Eleonora's falcons time their breeding to coincide with the passage of migrating birds. Up to two million migrant waders overwinter at the Banc d’Arguin mudflats in Mauritania. The seas of equatorial West Africa are heated by the Guinea Current which brings high rainfall to the coast. Here, elephants and hippos are shown moving through the mangroves and red river hogs feeding on sandy beaches. Further south, the Namib Desert extends to the coast. The cold Atlantic waters are rich feeding grounds for Cape fur seals and penguins. Fur seal pups are vulnerable in the heat, and those that perish are picked off by black-backed jackals and brown hyenas. Around the Cape, great white sharks use a unique hunting technique to catch seals.

=== 5. "Jungle" ===
Broadcast 5 December 2001

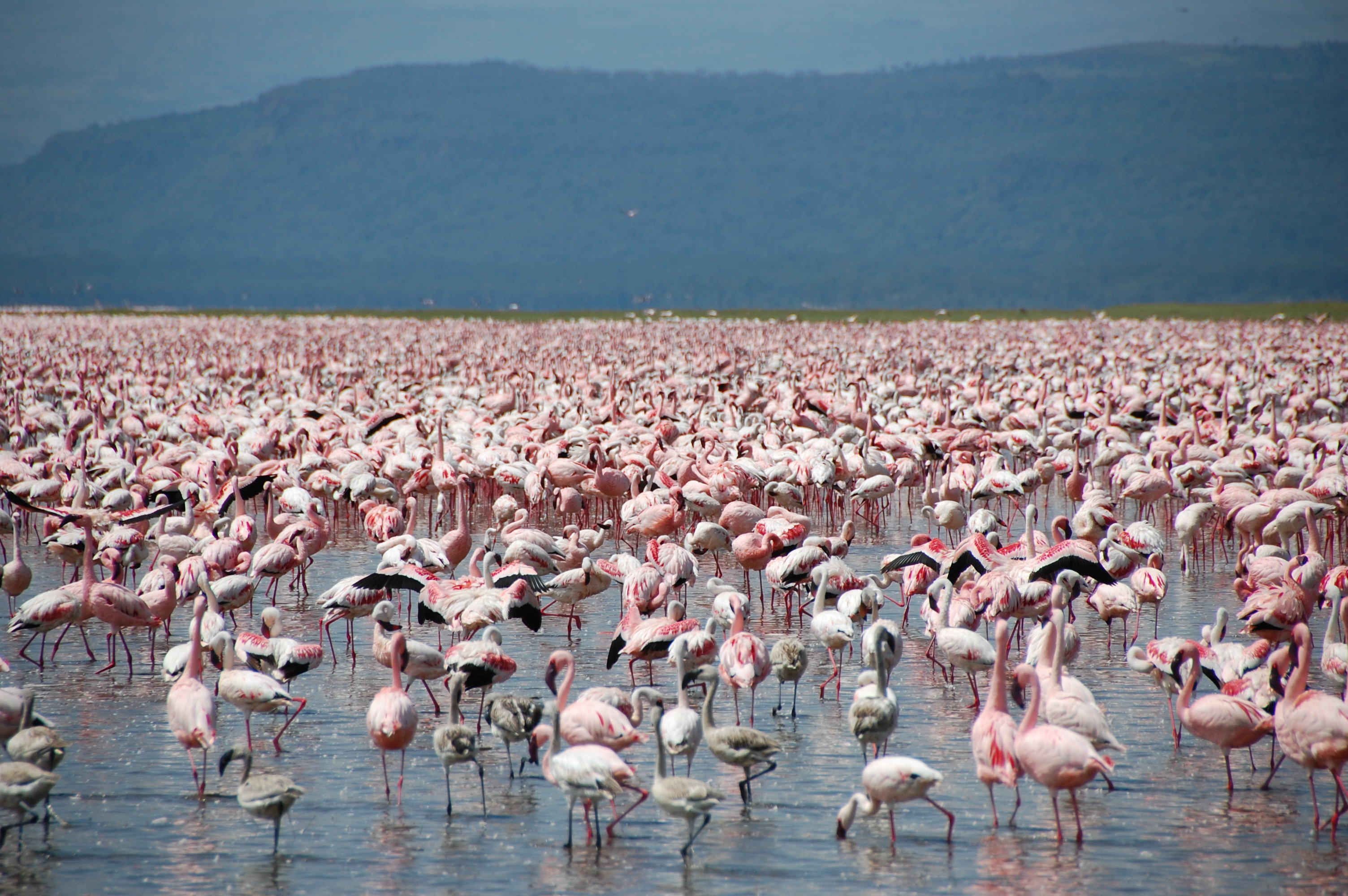
Flamingos at Lake Nakuru

The penultimate episode looks at the continent's rainforests, which cover equatorial Africa from Uganda to Sierra Leone. Their extent responds to climatic variations and as this is a wet period in Africa's history, the forests are near their maximum coverage. In the wet season, killifish hatch, grow and breed in a puddle in an elephant's footprint and can move across land to find new water sources. Fruiting trees attract birds such as Black-casqued hornbills, great blue turacos and grey parrots. Elephants are filmed breaking open fallen omphalocarpum fruits using their trunks, behaviour only recently discovered by scientists. The fruit eaters also help to disperse seeds. Black-and-white colobus are leaf-eaters, but despite living in the canopy, they are hunted by Biaka pygmies and crowned eagles. The Biakas also harvest yams, climb to bees nests to collect honey and use natural toxins to stun fish in the forest streams. A fast-growing giant yam exploits the gap created by a fallen tree. The yam has several defences against being eaten, including attracting aggressive ants, but a particular beetle has evolved a strategy to combat both yam and ants. Chimpanzees are filmed using sticks to extract termites and safari ants from hollow logs. At a few special places in the forests, large clearings created by elephants attract many animals to socialise, reinforce bonds and feed on the mineral-rich ground. One such clearing is Dzanga Bai in the Central African Republic, visited by 2,800 elephants, shy bongos and western lowland gorillas.

=== 6. "Lakes and Rivers" ===
Broadcast 12 December 2001

The final programme looks at how water influences life on the continent. Rain falling on the mountains of equatorial Africa eventually flows into Nile, Congo, Niger and other great rivers. The Luangwa, a tributary of the Zambezi, draws animals from the surrounding arid lands. Predators and prey drink alongside one another in an uneasy truce. The waters hold dangers too; a Nile crocodile attacks a buffalo. When river levels fall, hippos are forced together and sometime fatal territorial fights ensue. Crocodiles are filmed tearing flesh from a hippo carcass. Carmine bee-eaters excavate nest chambers in exposed river banks, but African fish eagles and monitor lizards prey on the birds and their eggs. The lakes of East Africa hold most of the continent's fresh water. Over 600 species of cichlid have evolved in Lake Malawi, each occupying their own niche. The fish and migrating birds feast on a seasonal bonanza provided by clouds of black flies hatching on the water's surface. Africa has great wetlands too. Zambia's Banguela Swamp is a rich fishing ground for shoebills, spoonbills and egrets. The Okavango River flows towards the Kalahari Desert, creating the greatest inland delta in the world. It is paradise for hippos, but savannah animals have had to adapt. Lions have learned to swim across the water channels to keep up with their prey. The final scenes show the vast flocks of flamingos at the soda lakes of East Africa. Every few years, they engage in synchronised courtship dances.

== Awards ==
Wild Africa won two awards at the 2003 Jackson Hole Wildlife Film Festival in the Best Limited Series and Best Cinematography categories. The series was also nominated for its photography at the 2001 BAFTA Craft Awards.

== Merchandise ==
A book, soundtrack CD, and DVD are all available to accompany the TV series:

- A Region 2 and 4, 2-disc DVD set was released on 18 July 2005 (BBCDVD1700) featuring all six full-length episodes and the bonus documentary "The Super Herd" from the Wildlife on One series. Wild Africa is one of four series which comprise the Region 1 DVD box set BBC Atlas of the Natural World: Europe and Africa, released on 2 October 2007.
- The accompanying hardcover book, Wild Africa by Patrick Morris, Amanda Barrett, Andrew Murray and Marguerite Smits van Oyen, was published by BBC Books on 1 November 2001 (ISBN 0-563-53790-6).
- An original orchestral soundtrack CD, composed and conducted by Christopher Gunning, was released by BBC Music on 19 November 2001.

== See also ==
- BBC Atlas of the Natural World, a 2006-07 DVD box set for North America
