= Patrick Morris (director) =

British director

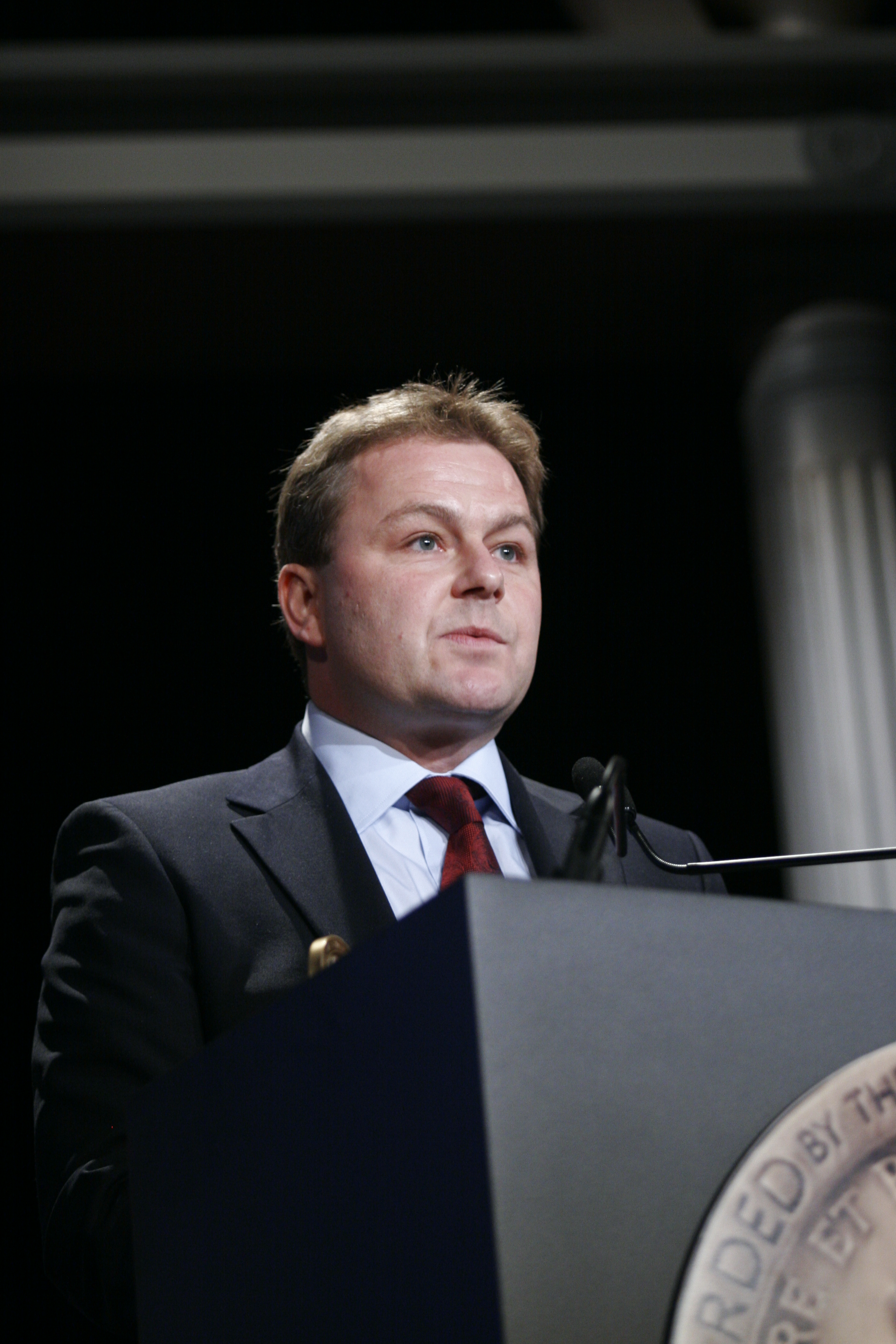
- Patrick Morris at the 66th Annual Peabody Awards
- Occupations: Producer, Director, Series Producer and Executive Producer
- Notable work: Enchanted Kingdom, Life, Galapagos, Hokkaido: Garden of the Gods, Dune and People of the Sea

Patrick Morris is a British producer, director and series producer of many wildlife documentaries.

== Life/Career ==
Morris attended King’s College, Taunton, and the University of Leeds, graduating with a first-class honours degree in Zoology.

Morris began his career working in East Africa with renowned film-maker Hugo van Lawick producing films for the BBC, Discovery Channel, National Geographic, and PBS Nova, including Islands in the African Sky, Wings over the Serengeti, and Africa's Paradise of Thorns. In 1995, he teamed up with Hugh Miles to produce People of the Sea for the BBC and National Geographic, about the collapse of the cod-fishing industry in Newfoundland, Canada, and its impact on people and wildlife. Morris then joined the BBC Natural History Unit in 1999 to produce documentaries for the Natural World and Wildlife on One strands including Hokkaido: Garden of the Gods, Dune and Ospreys, as well as series producing the BBC series Wild Africa, Europe: A Natural History, British Isles: A Natural History, Galápagos, Wild West and Mexico: Earth's Festival of Life. Morris was also co-producer of the BBC wildlife special Grizzly, executive producer of the Wildlife on One Thunderball, creative consultant on theYellowstone series, and producer of the Birds and Primates episodes for the BBC1 series Life, narrated by Sir David Attenborough, about extreme animal behaviour. Morris’ films Galápagos and People of the Sea both won the Grand Teton best of festival award at the Jackson Hole Wildlife Film Festival. From 2010 to 2014, he co-directed Enchanted Kingdom, a 3D theatrical nature film for BBC Earth Films in partnership with Evergreen Films, Reliance Entertainment, and IM Global, narrated by Idris Elba. The film won best 3D film at the Wildscreen Film Festival 2014, best theatrical film and best cinematography at International Wildlife Film Festival Missoula 2015, and best motion picture documentary at the International 3D and Advanced Imaging Society Creative Arts Awards 2015. Morris also co-directed Wild Africa 3D, a giant screen film narrated by Helena Bonham Carter.
