= Galápagos (2006 TV series) =

- DVD cover
- Genre: Documentary
- Narrated by: Tilda Swinton
- Country of origin: United Kingdom
- Original language: English
- No. of seasons: 1
- No. of episodes: 3

Production
- Executive producer: Michael Gunton
- Producers: Patrick Morris; Andrew Murray; Joe Stevens; Ashley Hoppin; Jill Shinefield; Gail Willumsen
- Cinematography: Paul Stewart; Richard Wollocombe; Barrie Britton; Richard Brooks Burton; Peter Scoones; John Waters

Original release
- Release: 26 September 2006

Galápagos is a three-part BBC nature documentary series exploring the natural history of the Galápagos Islands and their important role in the formation of Charles Darwin's theory of evolution. It was first transmitted in the UK on BBC Two in September 2006.

The series was filmed in high definition, produced by Mike Gunton and Patrick Morris of the BBC Natural History Unit and narrated by actress Tilda Swinton. The series was proposed to the BBC by the principal cinematographers Paul D. Stewart and Richard Wollocombe.

== Episodes ==
The episodes, each 50 minutes in length, are as follows:

- "Born of Fire" - an introduction to the volcanic islands
- "Islands that Changed the World" - reveals how the islands helped shape the theory of evolution
- "Forces of Change" - how life has evolved to cope with climatic and volcanic changes

Some of the endemic wildlife featured in the series includes frigatebirds, marine iguanas, flightless cormorants, Galápagos tortoises, Galápagos finches and blue-footed boobies.

== Awards ==
The opening episode "Born of Fire" won four awards at the 2007 International Wildlife Film Festival in Missoula. It won "Best of Festival" at the Jackson Hole Wildlife Film Festival 2007 and won a prestigious Peabody Award in the same year. Horace Newcomb, director of the Peabody Awards, described the first episode as one of the most beautiful things he has ever seen. It was also BAFTA, Royal Television Society, WildScreen & Emmy nominated for cinematography and won further awards for its photography from the Guild of Television Cameramen and the Japanese Wildlife Film Festival in 2007. Galapagos DVD and Blu-ray sales in the USA were second only to Planet Earth and Blue Planet in BBC Worldwide Natural History sales for three years after its release.

== Merchandise ==
A DVD, Blu-ray, soundtrack CD and book were released to accompany the TV series:

- A Region 2, 2-disc DVD set (BBCDVD1997) featuring all three full-length episodes was released on 30 October 2006. The DVD includes the specially-commissioned 60-minute documentary, "Lonesome George and the Battle for Galápagos", originally broadcast alongside Galápagos on BBC Four.
- The series was released on a region-free Blu-ray disc (BBCBD0011) on 12 November 2007. This disc shows the film in a 1080i picture.
- The accompanying paperback book, Galápagos: The Islands that Changed the World by Paul D. Stewart, with a foreword by Richard Dawkins, was published by BBC Books on 7 September 2006 (ISBN 0-563-49356-9).
- Soundtrack CD with music created by Paul Leonard-Morgan was released in 2006.
