= Neil Nightingale =

British filmmaker, producer and consultant

Neil Nightingale (born 6 February 1960) is a British freelance wildlife filmmaker, executive producer and creative consultant with over 35 years experience at the BBC.

His most recent project is Shared Planet, a global series exploring the many ways in which sharing our lives with wildlife can bring real benefits and a brighter future for all of us.

From 2009 to 2018 he was the creative director of BBC Earth, BBC Worldwide's global brand for all BBC nature and science content.

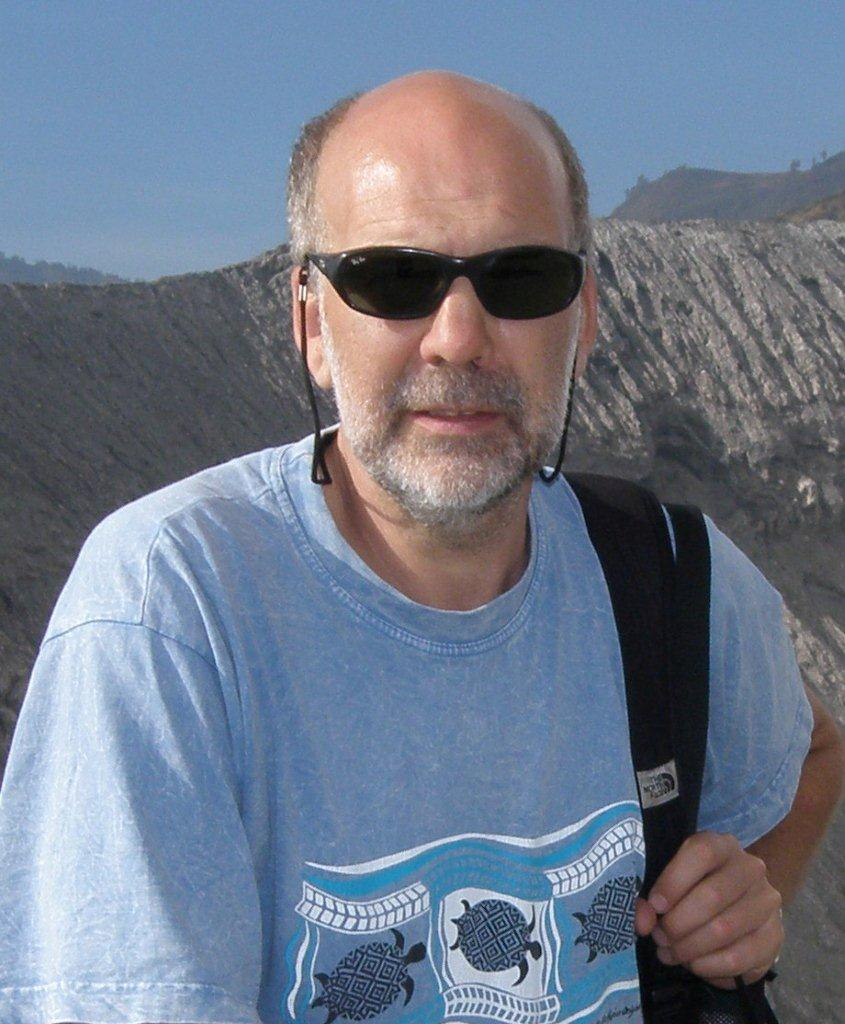
Neil Nightingale

In this role Nightingale led the development and production of new forms of commercial content including feature films, 4D experiences, live events, interactive visitor attractions Giant Screen films, and Digital Projects. He is the co-director of two 3D feature films, Walking with Dinosaurs 3D (2013) and Enchanted Kingdom 3D (2014), as well as executive producer of BBC Earth's slate of theatrical and 3D giant screen films, including Tiny Giants (2014) , Wild Africa (2015), Earthflight (2016) , Incredible Predators (2016), Earth-One Amazing Day (2017) and producer of Oceans: Our Blue Planet (2018).

== Early career ==
Nightingale attended Wadham College, Oxford and graduated with a first class degree in Zoology. After working as a freelance science journalist for New Scientist, he joined the BBC in 1983 as a researcher and assistant producer in a variety of television genres, including current affairs, regional programmes, science and education.

His first natural history production credits were for a number of programmes in the Wildlife on One series. He later moved on to the challenges of engaging audiences with series on fossils and plants as the producer of Lost Worlds, Vanished Lives and The Private Life of Plants, both of which were collaborations with veteran broadcaster David Attenborough.

In 1995, Nightingale took on the role of Series Editor for The Natural World, BBC Two's long-running flagship natural history series. Under his editorship, The Natural World's programmes won awards at every major international wildlife film festival as well as the Royal Television Society award for Best Documentary Strand.

He went on to produce five episodes of BBC One's Wildlife Specials as executive producer. He was also executive producer of several series in the Continents strand for BBC Two, including Wild Africa and Wild Down Under. In 2003, Nightingale went on to become Head of the Natural History Unit, the largest wildlife film-making production unit in the world. He led the Unit for 6 years; from February 2003 until June 2009.

== Recent career ==
Under his leadership the Unit developed its reputation for innovative and ambitious natural history broadcasting. He oversaw well-received television series including Planet Earth (2006), Springwatch (2005), Wild China (2008) and Life (2009), as well as the Unit's largest-ever radio production, World on the Move (2008), which followed migrating animals live, and Breathing Places, an ambitious multimedia campaign which successfully encouraged thousands of people to undertake hands-on activities with nature. He also moved the Unit into the field of feature films with Deep Blue (2003) and Earth (2007), both spin-offs from successful television series. Earth is the most successful documentary feature film produced in Britain ever.

In January 2009 the BBC announced that Nightingale was to stand down after six years as Head of the Unit to return to programme making. He was succeeded in the role by Andrew Jackson.

Nightingale was a co-founder and vice chairman of the BBC Wildlife Fund, a conservation charity established in 2007. Its appeals raised over £3 million for endangered species conservation, and it has funded almost 90 projects in the UK and around the world.

From 2002 until 2009, Nightingale was a trustee of Wildscreen, a charity which organises the biennial wildlife film festival of the same name in Bristol. Its ARKive project aims to create an online database of all the world's threatened species.

== Defending criticism ==
As Head of the Natural History Unit, Nightingale faced down criticism over the issues of viewer deception and value for money for licence fee payers.

In 2007, because of a lower than expected licence fee settlement, the BBC announced major cutbacks across its factual production departments, including budget and staff cuts at the Natural History Unit. The cutbacks were highly disapproved of by veteran broadcaster and natural history enthusiast David Attenborough, a long-time collaborator with the NHU.

The following year, Nightingale defended the Unit against accusations of profligacy with regard to the production costs of the Big Cat Live series. According to newspaper reports, a production team of 94 people was based in a luxury hotel in Kenya during three weeks of filming.

Film techniques used by the Natural History Unit came under close scrutiny in 2008 following a number of scandals in which other programme-making departments in the BBC were revealed to have 'deceived' viewers. Examples of the use of tame animals (a red fox in The Nature of Britain) and studio sets (deep sea life in The Blue Planet) to simulate footage from the wild were brought to light. Nightingale rebutted accusations of misleading viewers, arguing that it is almost impossible to film certain sequences in the wild and that the Unit is open about its methods.

== Television and film credits ==
- "Shared Planet" (2025) - executive producer
- "Cuba 3D" (2019) - executive producer
- "Oceans - Our Blue Planet 3D" (2018) - producer
- "Earth - One Amazing Day" Feature Film (2017) - executive producer
- "Incredible Predators 3D" (2016) - executive producer
- "Earthflight 3D" (2016) - executive producer
- "Wild Africa 3D" (2015) - director and producer
- "Prehistoric Planet 3D" - director
- "Tiny Giants 3D" - executive producer
- Enchanted Kingdom 3D Feature Film (2014) - director and producer
- Walking with Dinosaurs 3D (2013) - director
- Great Barrier Reef (2012) - executive producer
- One Life Feature Film (2011) - executive producer
- Unnatural Histories (2011) - executive producer
- Birds Britannia (2010) - executive producer
- The Meerkats Feature Film (2008) – executive producer
- Wild Down Under (2003) – executive producer
- Wild New World (2002) – executive producer

Episode "Land of the Mammoth" (2002)

- Wild Africa (2001) – executive producer

Episode "Lakes and Rivers" (2001)
Episode "Jungle" (2001)
Episode "Coasts" (2001)
Episode "Deserts" (2001)
Episode "Mountains" (2001)

- Congo (2001) – executive producer
- Wild Battlefields (2002–2003) – executive producer
- BBC Wildlife Specials – executive producer

Episode "Elephants: Spy in the Herd" (2003)
Episode "Gorilla: On the Trail of King Kong" (2002)
Episode "Grizzly: Face to Face" (2001)
Episode "Lions: Spy in the Den" (2000)
Episode "Tiger" (1999)

- Dive to Shark City (1999) – executive producer
- A Winter's Tale (1998) - executive producer
- Natural World – series editor (1996–2001)
- Restless Year (1996) - producer
- The Private Life of Plants (1995) – producer

Episode "Surviving" (1995)
Episode "Living Together" (1995)
Episode "Flowering" (1995)
Episode "The Social Struggle" (1995)
Episode "Growing" (1995)
Episode "Travelling" (1995)

- Nature Special, City Trees: Under the Axe? (1995) - producer
- New Guinea: An Island Apart (1992) - producer

Episode "Other Worlds" (1992)
Episode "Beyond the Unknown Shore" (1992)

- Portrait of a Planet (1990) – producer
- Lost Worlds, Vanished Lives (1989) - producer
- Wildlife on One – producer

Episode "Lost Lakes of the Pacific" (1996)
Episode "Babies Beware" (1992)
Episode "Parrot Fashion" (1989)
Episode "The Tale of the Pregnant Male" (1988)
