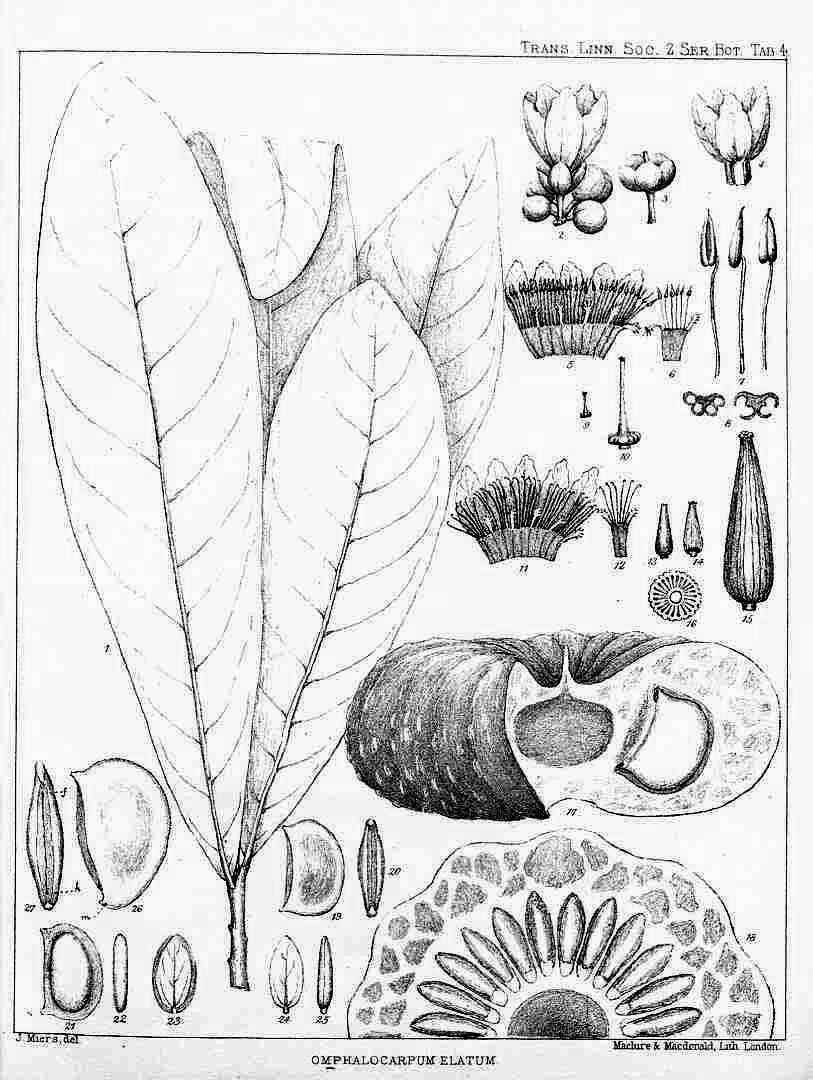
- Omphalocarpum elatum plate by John Miers in 1875

Conservation status
- Least Concern (IUCN 3.1)

Scientific classification
- Kingdom: Plantae
- Clade: Tracheophytes
- Clade: Angiosperms
- Clade: Eudicots
- Clade: Asterids
- Order: Ericales
- Family: Sapotaceae
- Genus: Omphalocarpum
- Species: O. elatum

Binomial name
- Omphalocarpum elatum Miers

Synonyms
- Heterotypic Synonyms: Omphalocarpum anocentrum Pierre ex Engl.; Omphalocarpum radlkoferi Baill.; Omphalocarpum radlkoferi var. pluriloculare Engl.; Omphalocarpum trillesianum Pierre ex Engl.

= Omphalocarpum elatum =

Species of tree

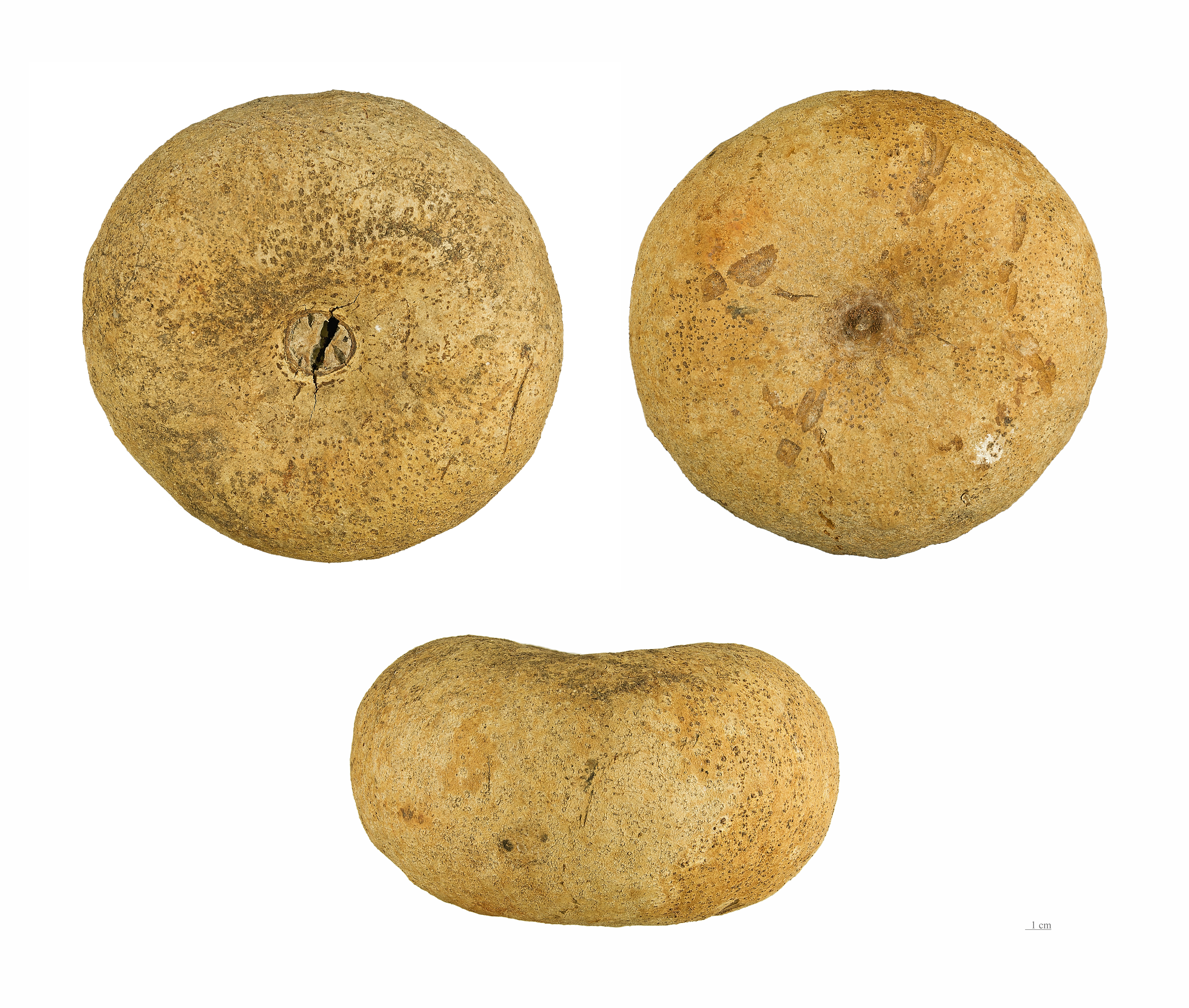

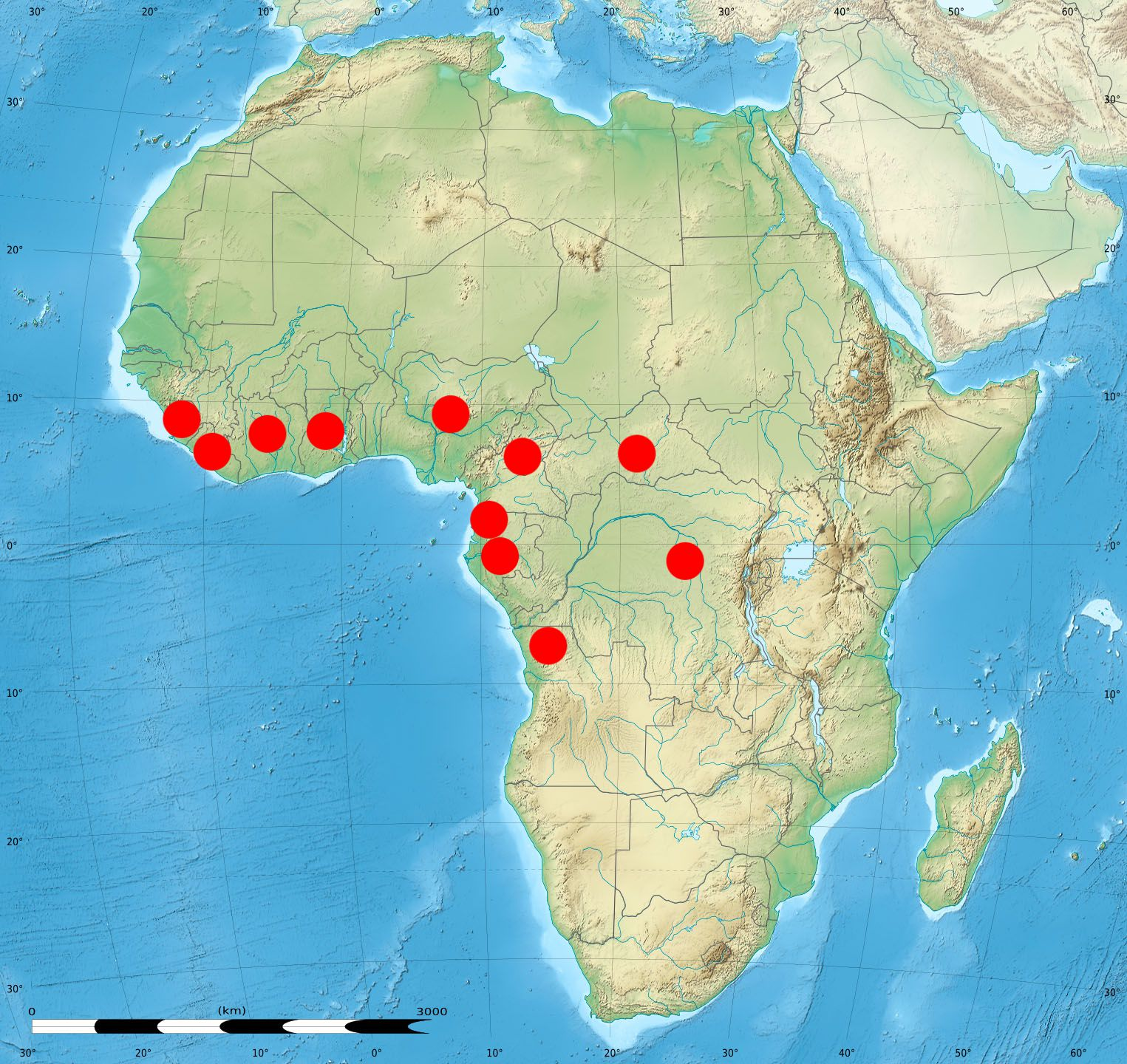

Omphalocarpum elatum Miers is a species of flowering plant in the family Sapotaceae. It is a tall tropical African tree, remarkable for the large fruits growing directly from the trunk, and in many ways resembling the Lecythidaceae genus Napoleonaea. It is native to Cabinda, Cameroon, the Central African Republic, the Democratic Republic of the Congo, Equatorial Guinea, Gabon, Ghana, the Gulf of Guinea islands, Ivory Coast, Liberia, Nigeria,the Republic of the Congo, and Sierra Leone The fruits are favoured by elephants, the only animals able to break through the hard shell. They do this by skewering the fruit with a tusk while using their trunk to brace it against the ground. Having passed through the elephant's digestive tract, seeds germinate more readily. Although not yet endangered, the tree's life cycle is tied to that of forest elephants, and may become threatened in regions where elephant populations are under pressure.

The tree is some 30 m (98 ft) tall and about 80 cm (31 in) in diameter at breast height, with a straight trunk which is fluted near its base and having no buttresses. Its bark is scaly and reddish-brown in color with lenticels in vertical rows, its slash showing as pinkish-brown with copious white latex. Leaves are alternate and simple, up to 25 x 8 cm in clusters at the ends of branchlets, oblanceolate with obtuse-rounded apex, and decurrent base. The secondary venation is parallel and the abaxial leaf surfaces are glabrous. The flowers resemble those of Mimusops, the inflorescences occurring in fascicles, with 4-6 flowers per fascicle. The calyx is made up of 5 sepals, each 5–12 mm long; the corolla tube and lobes are 9–17 mm long; the stamens are 12 mm long. The ovary is 5-locular. Fruits grow from the trunk, are flattened sub-globose in shape (oblate spheroid), some 15 x 8 cm, with a hard exocarp and whitish pulp, holding numerous seeds. The species may be found flowering and fruiting throughout the year where climatic conditions are suitable. The fruit takes about one year to mature and ripen.

Its uses include planks, mortars and bowls, handles, seats and drums, and dugout canoes. A decoction of the bark is used to treat constipation, malaria, and as a cure for lactation failure, while a decoction of the young leaves is used to treat coughs. A mixture of the seeds and bark, soaked in palm wine, is used as a purgative, while the seeds are also used in the treatment of yaws, for jewellery such as bangles and necklaces, and in rattles. The bark of this species is an effective anthelmintic against larvae of the parasitic worm Haemonchus contortus, while the seeds contain alkaloids and saponins.

== Etymology ==
'omphalocarpum' = navel fruit, 'elatum' = lofty
