= Wild New World =

- Series title card from US broadcast
- Also known as: Prehistoric America 野性新世界 (Chinese)" 先史時代のアメリカ (Japanese)"
- Genre: Nature documentary
- Narrated by: Jack Fortune; Joe Morton (US)
- Composer: Barnaby Taylor
- Countries of origin: United Kingdom & Japan and China
- Original languages: English & Japanese and Chinese
- No. of episodes: 6

Production
- Executive producer: Neil Nightingale
- Producer: Miles Barton
- Running time: 50 minutes
- Production companies: BBC Natural History Unit; Discovery Channel

Original release
- Network: BBC Two; BBC Three
- Release: 3 October – 7 November 2002

Wild New World (also known as Prehistoric America) is a six-part BBC documentary series about Ice Age North America that describes the prehistory, landscape and wildlife of the continent from the arrival of humans to the welcome of the Ice Age. It was first transmitted in the UK & JP on BBC Two from 3 October to 7 November 2002. Like several other BBC programmes, it contains both computer graphics and real-life animals. Occasionally, footage of non-American counterparts of the extinct North American beasts (like the American lion and the American cheetah) are used in juxtaposition with footage of native American animals, like the pronghorn.

Wild New World was co-produced by the BBC Natural History Unit and Discovery Channel. The music was composed by Barnaby Taylor and performed by the BBC Concert Orchestra. The series was narrated by Jack Fortune and produced by Miles Barton.

The series forms part of the Coordinator History Unit's Continents strand. It was preceded by Wild Africa in 2001 and followed by Wild Down Under in 2003.

== Production ==
The series was announced by the BBC with the working title All American Animals, but it was later changed to Wild New World.

== Episodes ==
All episode names were given from BBC website. All broadcast dates refer to the original UK transmission.

Each of the episode consists with the prehistory and wildlife of a particular region in the United States, except for final episode which is about various modern American animals. 2.79 million viewers watched the first episode.

No.	Title	Original release date
1	"Land of the Mammoth"	3 October 2002
Preserved in the frozen soil of Alaska are clues to an unknown land, where muskoxen and Yukon wild horses roamed alongside woolly mammoths. Beringian cave lions harried the families of mammoths, formidable in the defence of their young. The lions were more successful at hunting at steppe bison in the snow but they were no match for the giant short-faced bear.
2	"Canyonlands"	10 October 2002
The first people to experience the splendours of the Grand Canyon would have seen a much greener, richer land. Today it is cougar country, but then bizarre Shasta ground sloths sheltered in the caves and browsed in the canyons alongside Columbian mammoths. Camels were on the menu for both the first people and the impressive sabre-tooth cat (Smilodon).
3	"Ice Age Oasis"	17 October 2002
Today, Florida is a haven for the manatees, alligators and waterbirds which abound in its clear, turquoise springs. But when the Ice Age gripped much of the continent, the south was a warm paradise for the earliest human hunters as well as warmth loving wildlife. Tapirs and capybaras grazed in the swamps, dwarfed by the large browsers, the giant ground sloths and mastodons. Smilodons came to face to face with skunks and jaguars stalked armoured glyptodonts.
4	"Edge of the Ice"	24 October 2002
The towering rainforests of the Pacific Northwest have a timeless quality, yet when the first humans reached this coast, they witnessed a very different landscape. Open woodlands and Arctic tundra were home to caribou, woolly mammoths, Columbian mammoths, and mastodons – all potential prey for the scimitar-toothed cat (Homotherium).
5	"American Serengeti"	31 October 2002
The vast seas of grass on the Great Plains are home to bison, coyotes and prairie dogs today. But previously the area was an American Serengeti, populated by Columbian mammoths (the largest of all mammoths). Here American cheetah hunted pronghorn antelope and American lions stalked horses and bison. But the most impressive of all the carnivores was the giant short-faced bear.
6	"Mammoths to Manhattan"	7 November 2002
The final episode shows how the megafauna become extinct, and about how modern animals living on the continent have adapted to the increasing human population and development in North America. The meeting between human and megafauna in North America was a deadly one – most of the large land animals, including all the mammoths and mastodons, horses, camels, giant ground sloths, short-faced bear, and all the big cats (except the cougar) disappeared and the landscape changed dramatically. But some animals learned to flourish in human's environment. Today, chimney swifts roost in the towering smokestacks of Portland, kit foxes den in Los Angeles suburbs, moose trample the gardens of Anchorage and red tailed hawks nest in Manhattan. The episode concludes with a scene set at Disney's Animal Kingdom showing that despite the absence of large megafauna, humans in North America can still experience seeing large animals in-person with their modern relatives.

== Themes ==
The show's episodes offer several common themes, the main one being the coming of humans to America via the Ice Age's land bridge and causing the extinction of the North American megafauna featured in the episodes. Another BBC programme, Monsters We Met picks up and elaborates on this topic in greater detail. A more recent Discovery show, Prehistoric, also features scenic elements of Prehistoric America, such as the present melting away to reveal the past, as well as creatures already shown by the show, like the American mastodon, Arctodus and Columbian mammoth.

== Merchandise ==
=== DVD ===
In United States and Canada, a two-disc DVD format was released under the title "Prehistoric America" on 7 September 2004 by BBC Warner. The series was included with two additional programmes:

- Grand Canyon – From Dinosaurs to Dams Everglades
- To Hell and Back Other: Fact Files Documentary

A three-disc DVD format was released in China for Region 6 on 12 June 2008 by Excel Media.

=== Books ===
In United Kingdom, an accompanying hardcover format was written by Miles Barton, Nigel Bean, Stephen Dunleavy, Ian Gray and Adam White, with foreword by D. Bruce Means. It was released on 19 September 2002 and published by BBC Worldwide. (ISBN 0-563-53425-7)

The companion volume for the US market, Prehistoric America: A Journey through the Ice Age and Beyond, was published by the Yale University Press on 8 February 2003.(ISBN 0-300-09819-7)

== See also ==
- Ice Age Giants
- The Blue Planet
- Walking with Dinosaurs
- Walking with Beasts
- Walking with Monsters
- Walking with Cavemen
- Monsters We Met
