= BBC Atlas of the Natural World =

The BBC Atlas of the Natural World is the title of two compilations (boxed sets) of DVDs consisting of eight separate nature documentary series produced by the BBC Natural History Unit between 1987 and 2005. The boxed sets, each consisting of 4 series and 6 DVDs, are subtitled "Western Hemisphere and Antarctica" and "Africa and Europe". They were released on 31 October 2006 and 2 October 2007, respectively, for DVD Region 1 (i.e., Canada, United States, U.S. territories, and Bermuda). They were later released in DVD Region 4, although still with NTSC video.

The two compilations consist of the following series and episodes:

== BBC Atlas of the Natural World: Western Hemisphere and Antarctica ==
(4 series; 6 discs; 1055 minutes)

- Disc 1 & 2: Land of the Eagle (1991; 394 minutes)
  - Disc 1:
    - Episode 1. "The Great Encounter"
    - Episode 2. "Confronting the Wilderness"
    - Episode 3. "Conquering Swamps"
    - Episode 4. "Across the Seas of Grass"
  - Disc 2:
    - Episode 5. "Into the Shining Mountains"
    - Episode 6. "Living on the Edge"
    - Episode 7. "The First and Last Frontier"
    - Episode 8. "Searching for Paradise"
- Disc 3: Spirits of the Jaguar (1996; 196 minutes)
    - Episode 1. "The Forging of a New World"
    - Episode 2. "Forests of the Maya"
    - Episode 3. "Hunters of the Caribbean Sea"
    - Episode 4. "The Fifth World of the Aztecs"
- Disc 4: Land of the Tiger (1997)
    - Episode 1. "The Tiger's Domain"
    - Episode 2. "Sacred Waters"
    - Episode 3. "Unknown Seas"
    - Episode 4. "Desert Kingdom"
    - Episode 5. "Mountains of the Gods"
    - Episode 6. "Monsoon Forest"
- Disc 5: Wild South America; Original title: Andes to Amazon (2000; 294 minutes)
    - Episode 1. "Lost Worlds"
    - Episode 2. "Mighty Amazon"
    - Episode 3. "The Great Plains"
    - Episode 4. "The Andes"
    - Episode 5. "Amazon Jungle"
    - Episode 6. "Penguin Shores."
- Disc 6: Life in the Freezer (1993)
    - Episode 1. "The Bountiful Sea"
    - Episode 2. "The Ice Retreats"
    - Episode 3. "The Race to Breed"
    - Episode 4. "The Door Closes"
    - Episode 5. "The Big Freeze"
    - Episode 6. "Footsteps in the Snow

== BBC Atlas of the Natural World: Africa and Europe ==
(4 Series; 6 discs; 1055 minutes)

- Disc 1 & 2: Wild Africa (2001; 294 minutes)
  - Disc 1:
    - Episode 1. "Mountains"
    - Episode 2. "Savannah"
    - Episode 3. "Deserts"
    - Episode 4. "Coasts"
  - Disc 2:
    - Episode 5. " Jungles"
    - Episode 6. " Lakes and Rivers
  - Bonus: Nile (2004)
    - Episode 1. "Crocodiles and Kings"
    - Episode 2. "The Great Flood"

(The final episode "The Search for the Source" is not included.)

- Disc 3: Congo (2001; 146 minutes)
    - Episode 1. "The River That Swallows All Rivers"
    - Episode 2. "Spirits of the Forest"
    - Episode 3. "Footprints in the Forest"

NB: Disc 3 also includes the 48-minute episode "Spirits of the Forest" (about Madagascar) from the BBC television series The Natural World.

- Disc 4: The First Eden: The Mediterranean World and Man (1987; 220 minutes)
    - Episode 1. "The Making of the Garden"
    - Episode 2. "The Gods Enslaved"
    - Episode 3. "The Wastes of War"

(The final episode "Strangers in the Garden" is not included.)

- Disc 5: Europe: A Natural History (2005; 200 minutes)
    - Episode 1. "Genesis"
    - Episode 2. "Ice Ages"
    - Episode 3. "Taming the Wild"
    - Episode 4. "A New Millennium"
- Disc 6: Bonus Features
    - Iceland
    - Scandinavia (2-part series)
