= Wild Down Under =

- Series title card from UK broadcast
- Also known as: Wild Australasia
- Genre: Nature documentary
- Narrated by: Matt Day
- Composer: Adrian Johnston
- Country of origin: United Kingdom
- Original language: English
- No. of episodes: 6

Production
- Executive producers: Neil Nightingale (BBC); Dione Gilmour (ABC)
- Running time: 50 minutes
- Production companies: BBC Natural History Unit; Animal Planet; ABC

Original release
- Network: BBC Two
- Release: 12 September – 17 October 2003

Related
- Wild New World; Europe: A Natural History

Wild Down Under is a BBC nature documentary series exploring the natural history of the Australasian continent, first transmitted in the UK on BBC Two in September 2003. It was broadcast in Australia under the title Wild Australasia in February 2004. In Canada, the show aired as episodes of The Nature of Things under the Wild Australia title.

Each of the six episodes features a particular environment and, using a combination of aerial photography and traditional wildlife footage, reveals how physical forces and human activity have transformed Australasia from a lush green wilderness into an increasingly dry and harsh continent, troubled by unpredictable weather but still home to a huge array of creatures found nowhere else on Earth..

Wild Down Under was co-produced by the BBC Natural History Unit, the Australian Broadcasting Corporation (ABC) and Animal Planet. The series was produced for the BBC by Neil Nightingale and executive-produced for ABC by Dione Gilmour. The music was composed by Adrian Johnston and performed by the BBC Concert Orchestra. The series was narrated by Australian actor Matt Day.

The series forms part of the Natural History Unit's Continents strand. It was preceded by Wild New World in 2002 and followed by Europe: A Natural History in 2005.

== Production ==
Wild Down Under is one of the most comprehensive surveys of Australasia's natural history ever filmed, with production of the series taking three years. The aerial photography used extensively in the series was shot by Damon Smith.

As well as mainland Australia, the production team visited other locations across the continent for the fifth episode, "Island Arks", including New Guinea, New Caledonia, Lord Howe Island and New Zealand.

== Episodes ==
Broadcast dates refer to the original UK transmission.

No.	Title	Original air date
1	"Wild Down Under"	12 September 2003
Uluru (Ayers Rock) at sunrise The first episode provides an overview of Australia's natural history. Tasmania gives a glimpse of Australia's lush forests of the past. A group of Tasmanian devils are filmed squabbling over a wallaby carcass. In eastern Australia, buckling formed the Australian Alps, high enough to attract snowfall. Wombats bulldoze the snow to reach buried grass and platypus hunt shrimp in the mountain streams. In the ancient tropical rainforest of the Top End, cassowaries, striped possums and sugar gliders are filmed. Kangaroos and koalas inhabit the more open eucalypt woodlands, and kookaburras feed their chicks in the nest hole. As Australia dried out, many rivers became intermittent or turned to creeks. Billabongs attract wildlife such as flocks of corella parrots, a sign of water to early explorers. They are curious, sociable birds, and are shown playing on branches and investigating the nest holes of budgerigars. In north Australia's wet season, the tropical wetlands of Kakadu attract millions of magpie geese and other water birds. When the land begins to dry out again, freshwater crocodiles must move to avoid being trapped in shrinking pools. Aerial photography is used to show features of Australia's deserts, such as parallel dunes and Uluru. A planigale hides from a taipan, the world's deadliest snake, and a sand goanna digs out a scorpion. The Great Barrier Reef was formed 10,000 years ago as sea levels rose. At certain tides after a full moon, its corals engage in the planet's greatest synchronised spawning event.
2	"Desert Heart"	19 September 2003
The second episode examines the deserts of Australia's interior. These harsh environments make up two-thirds of the land area. Vast areas support nothing but tough spinifex grass, indigestible to most herbivores. Instead, termites are the grazers of these grasslands. Inside the termite mound, a whole ecosystem flourishes; centipedes eat the termites and knob-tailed geckos prey on both. Lizards are one of the most successful animals in Australia's deserts, and a thorny devil is shown waiting alongside a pathway of ants. Mammals here are nocturnal, staying underground during the heat of the day. Those featured include bilbies and malas. Waterholes attract huge numbers of birds, and zebra finches are shown being preyed on by a falcon. Nearby, black-footed rock wallabies hop around on the precipitous rock faces. The Finke River is an important water source in central Australia and red-tailed black cockatoos gather here in large flocks to breed. Camels were originally brought over for transport, but now half a million roam the desert. Meat ants and aggressive bulldog ants are shown hunting and scavenging on the desert floor. The Simpson Desert has the largest expanse of parallel sand dunes in the world, but red kangaroos survive even here. Once thought to be an inland sea, Lake Eyre is normally an inhospitable salt pan. Every 30 years or so, exceptional rains charge rivers which flow inland, filling the lake. The waters trigger a rush to breed, attracting birds such as pelicans in their thousands.
3	"Southern Seas"	26 September 2003
Lord Howe Island The third instalment features the wildlife of Australasia's seas and coasts. On Western Australia's desert coastline, seas are lifeless apart from a few fertile pockets. Whale sharks feed close to shore at Ningaloo Reef. At Shark Bay, sharks and dogtooth tuna pin a sardine shoal to the shore, filmed from the air and underwater. A pair of Bryde's whales joins the feeding frenzy. Shallow, sandy bays are ideal conditions for seagrass, browsed by dugongs. In north Australia, monsoon rains flush rich sediment into the ocean. At low tide, golden ghost crabs and mudskippers emerge to feed on the exposed worms, snails and shellfish. The Leeuwin Current brings warm water to the south coast. Australian sea lions and southern right whales raise their young in the impoverished waters of the Great Australian Bight, while giant cuttlefish gather in the breeding season. The cold Southern Ocean skirts Australia's remote south west tip, where the seas are home to giant kelp forests and strange creatures. The leafy sea dragon is camouflaged as seaweed, while the handfish uses its fins to walk across the seabed. At night, female lobsters climb to high points on the reef to release their brood of larvae. In New Zealand's cold and nutrient-rich waters, gannets are filmed plunge-diving into a sardine shoal, which also attracts common dolphins. Hector's dolphins stay close to shore to avoid sharks. Snares Islands penguins must negotiate a steep granite rockface and patrolling Hooker's sealions to reach their nest burrows.
4	"Gum Tree Country"	3 October 2003
Australia's eucalypt forests are the subject of the fourth programme. In the tropical north, male frilled lizards fight over territory, but retreat to the trees as a kite passes overhead. Gang-gang cockatoos stay above the snowline of the southern mountains to feed on the seed capsules of snow gums. On the misty lower slopes, better soils enable the mountain ash to reach 100 metres, the tallest hardwood in the world. Animals of these forests include superb lyrebirds, Leadbeater's possums and mountain brushtail possums. Some gum trees survive in the arid conditions of the interior; the ghost gum even clings to rocky gorges. The eucalypts provide essential resources for wildlife. Their flowers attract nectar feeders such as lorikeets, honeyeaters and flying foxes, which also act as pollinators. The koala has a special digestive system which enables it to stomach the toxic leaves. Yellow-bellied gliders are shown licking sap and sailing between trees, while termites attack the trees themselves. Gum trees are highly flammable and are adapted to cope with bushfires: fresh shoots grow from buds protected by the insulating bark within weeks of a blaze. Regent parrots nest deep inside the river red gums along the Murray River to avoid predatory lace monitors. The boughs can drop without warning, and those that fall into the river provide shelter for Murray cod. The final scenes show red kangaroos bounding through a flooded forest – without periodic floods, the trees would not survive.
5	"Island Arks"	10 October 2003
Snares penguins on The Snares Islands The episode begins at Kakadu, a seasonal wetland and representative of the swamps that once stretched from north Australia to New Guinea. The lush tropical forests of New Guinea are home to creatures such as long-beaked echidnas, tree kangaroos and 38 kinds of bird of paradise, as well as richly varied human cultures. Male Raggiana birds of paradise are filmed displaying at a lek and mating. Further east, the submerged tips of extinct volcanoes support colourful reefs. Pygmy seahorses and razorfish use camouflage to avoid detection. Saltwater crocodiles can swim great distances, enabling them to colonise remote volcanic islands. No terrestrial mammals have made it this far, but fruit-eating bats such as the tube-nosed species feast on figs. On Lord Howe Island, the aerial displays of male tropicbirds are filmed, and adult sooty terns regurgitate meals for their chicks. New Caledonia is a remnant of the Australian land mass which broke away 80 million years ago. It has many unique species, especially lizards: the giant gecko is the largest of its kind. New Zealand lies on the edge of the continental land mass, and marine life drawn to its nutrient-rich seas include sperm whales and acrobatic dusky dolphins. On land, keas have colonised the Southern Alps and in the forests, kiwis and wētā occupy ecological niches normally associated with mammals. Introduced species have decimated the native fauna, but many species survive on offshore islands. The kākāpō, tūī, kaka, Fiordland penguin and sooty shearwater are all shown.
6	"New Worlds"	17 October 2003
The final instalment, which explores man's impact on Australia's wildlife. The arrival of Europeans brought huge changes. Some creatures have benefited – golf courses provide perfect browse for kangaroos and a landfill site is an important feeding ground for ibises – but many have suffered. Early homesick colonisers tried to model the landscape on the English countryside, bringing with them animals which have since wreaked havoc. Millions of wild pigs now roam, destroying vegetation, damaging waterholes and eating birds' eggs. Rabbits, camels and cane toads were also introduced and are out of control. European honeybees are supplanting native bees in the competition for nectar, and foxes prey on small marsupials. 54 native frogs, birds and mammals, including the Tasmanian tiger, have become extinct. Some which were presumed extinct have since been rediscovered, including Australia's rarest mammal, Gilbert's potoroo. Scientists are still searching for the night parrot after a single dead specimen was reported in 1990, but the great desert skink, familiar to Aborigines, is more widespread than previously thought. On Barrow Island, rare fauna including golden bandicoots and burrowing bettongs live amongst the oil wells, and a perentie drinks from a dripping air-conditioning unit. On Tasmania, devils and tiger quolls are filmed scavenging food in a sheep farmer's shed. Modern cities can also be a refuge for wildlife. 30,000 grey-headed flying foxes roost in Melbourne's botanical gardens and feed on orchard fruit nearby, while paying tourists feed wild rainbow lorikeets in a Brisbane park.

== Merchandise ==
A DVD and book were released to accompany the TV series:

- A Region 2 and 4, 2-disc DVD set (BBCDVD1321) featuring all six full-length episodes was released on 27 October 2003. The bonus features on the DVD include an edition of Wildlife on One (Possums – Tales of the Unexpected), a fact file and the featurette Wild – Penguin Paradise. A Region 4 DVD with the same content was released under the title Wild Australasia in 2004.
- The accompanying hardcover book, Wild Down Under by Neil Nightingale, Mary Summerill, Hugh Pearson and Jeni Cleversy, was published by BBC Books on 18 September 2003 (ISBN 0-563-48822-0). The foreword is written by Tim Flannery. In Australia the book was released under the title Wild Australasia.
