= Unnatural Histories =

- Directed by: Andrew Murray, Susie Painter, Raquel Toniolo
- Narrated by: Deborah Maclaren
- Country of origin: United Kingdom
- Original language: English
- No. of series: 1
- No. of episodes: 3

Production
- Executive producers: Neil Nightingale, Andrew Murray
- Producers: Andrew Murray, Susie Painter, Raquel Toniolo
- Cinematography: Jasper Montana, Owen Newman, Martyn Colbeck, Alastair MacEwan, Eric Janisch
- Editor: Dilesh Korya
- Running time: 60 minutes
- Production company: BBC

Original release
- Network: BBC Four
- Release: 9 June – 23 June 2011

Unnatural Histories is a 3-part British television documentary series produced by the BBC and BBC Natural History Unit. It takes a new look at three of the world's wildernesses; the Serengeti, Yellowstone National Park and the Amazon and discovers that far from being wild and untouched, each has been shaped over time by man. It was first broadcast on BBC Four 9–23 June 2011.

== Episode list ==
=== Episode 1: Serengeti ===
First aired on Thursday 9 June 2011. Investigates how the Serengeti became wild through the actions of a colonial disease that emptied the land of the people and livestock that had lived there for hundreds of years. This episode shows how this event allowed the modern vision of Africa as a pristine wilderness to take hold.

=== Episode 2: Yellowstone ===
First aired on Thursday 16 June 2011. This episode looks at the American West and the park of Yellowstone, whose birth was the result of romantic European ideals that were transported to the homelands of Native Americans by ambitious politicians and railroad tycoons.

=== Episode 3: Amazon ===
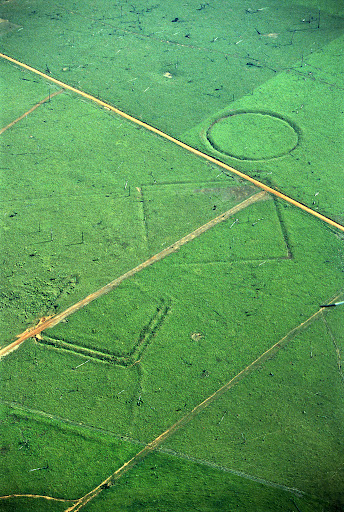
Geoglyphs on deforested land in the Amazon rainforest.

First aired on Thursday 23 June 2011. The final episode looks at the Amazon rainforest – billed as the world's last great wilderness. However, the discovery of geoglyphs uncovered following deforestation in the 1970s and terra preta, provide growing evidence for ancient cities in the heart of the 'virgin forest'. Ondemar Dias is accredited with first discovering the geoglyphs in 1977 and Alceu Ranzi with furthering their discovery after flying over Acre.

The documentary presents evidence that Francisco de Orellana, rather than exaggerating his claims as previously thought, was correct in his observations that a complex civilization was flourishing along the Amazon in the 1540s. It is believed that the civilization was later devastated by the spread of diseases from Europe, such as smallpox. Some 5 million people may have lived in the Amazon region in 1500, divided between dense coastal settlements, such as that at Marajó, and inland dwellers. By 1900 the population had fallen to 1 million and by the early 1980s it was less than 200,000.

The documentary features interviews with Betty Meggers, William Balée, Anna Roosevelt, José Iriarte, Eduardo Góes Neves, Cristiana Barreto, Francis Mayle, Denise Schaan and Michael Heckenberger.
