= Andes to Amazon =

- Series title card
- Also known as: Wild South America
- Genre: Nature documentary
- Narrated by: Fergal Keane
- Composer: Nicholas Hooper
- Country of origin: United Kingdom
- Original language: English
- No. of episodes: 6

Production
- Executive producer: Karen Bass
- Running time: 50 minutes
- Production companies: BBC Natural History Unit; Animal Planet

Original release
- Network: BBC Two
- Release: 6 November – 18 December 2000

Andes to Amazon is a nature documentary TV series co-produced by the BBC Natural History Unit in Bristol, England and Animal Planet, first transmitted in the UK on BBC2 in November 2000. In other territories it was broadcast under the title Wild South America

Each of the six 50-minute episodes portrays a different aspect of the South American continent. The series features extensive aerial photography of major landforms shot by Bob Fulton, and footage of rarely glimpsed animals in the wild. Andes to Amazon was narrated by Fergal Keane and produced by Karen Bass.

The series forms part of the Natural History Unit's Continents strand, and was preceded by Land of the Tiger in 1997 and followed one year later by Congo.

== Production ==
The filmmakers journeyed the length and breath of South America in search of locations and unusual species. Memorable sequences include an aerial journey over a glacier in Argentine Patagonia, jungle animals visiting an Amazon waterhole at night and luminous termite mounds in the grasslands of central Brazil. Other locations featured are the Galápagos Islands and the Salar de Uyuni, the world's biggest salt lake in the Bolivian altiplano.

Filming and post-production took three years in all.

== Episodes ==
Broadcast dates refer to the original UK transmission.

No.	Title	Original air date
1	"Lost Worlds"	6 November 2000
The opening episode traces the events that have created the unique landforms and ecology of South America. Originally part of the supercontinent Gondwana, it broke away around 100 million years ago and became an island. At that time, it was dominated by reptiles and strange plants similar to the araucarias and tree ferns of Chile's Valdivian forests. These forests also harbour descendants of the first mammals, small marsupials like the shrew opossum and monito del monte. Volcanic activity thrust up the Andes, where animals have had to adapt to the extreme environments of the altiplano and Patagonia. The Andes formed a natural barrier which altered the climate and the course of major rivers. Amazonia was once a great swamp, but now harbours the world’s greatest expanse of rainforest and its mightiest river. There are more species here than anywhere else, and many, including pygmy marmosets, have specialised diets. There are extreme dry environments here too. Guanacos survive in the Atacama Desert by eating lichens, whilst in windswept Patagonia, maras and burrowing owls squabble over the best nest holes. By contrast, the seas are rich in life: a pod of dusky dolphins is filmed attacking a shoal of anchovies. A land bridge with North America formed 3 million years ago, creating a pathway for invasive species. Those that survived were the opportunists like coatis, or specialists that exploited niches, like the maned wolf. Man, the most recent invader, has shaped the land and domesticated its animals to meet his own needs.
2	"Mighty Amazon"	13 November 2000
The second programme shows how life along the Amazon River is dominated by the annual cycle of floods. In the dry season, female giant river turtles gather on exposed sand banks to lay their eggs. As broad reaches of river are cut off by sandbars, caimans and egrets take advantage of the bounty of fish trapped in shallow lagoons. Underwater infrared cameras film scavenging candiru and an electric eel hunting. As the first rains arrive, a cormorant flock feeds quickly to take advantage before the fish begin to disperse. Black vultures get an easy meal as fish killed by oxygen-starved water wash up on the river banks. In the rainy season, water levels along the Amazon can rise up to 10 m. Invertebrates emerge from cover in the undergrowth and migrate into the trees to escape drowning, but lizards and praying mantises await their arrival. Fire ants mass into a floating raft to move from their flooded nests, while sloths and tarantulas have adapted to swimming between trees. Predators are at a disadvantage now, but giant otters are expert hunters and use teamwork to corral fish. The boto, a rare river dolphin, navigates the submerged forests using sonar. Rainforest trees, which can survive inundation for six months, time their fruiting to coincide with the floods, using fish as seed dispersers. Villages and communities line the river's banks, but their overall environmental impact is low and they have adapted to the annual cycle of flooding. The sheer scale of the Amazon may yet ensure its survival.
3	"Great Plains"	20 November 2000
The third instalment features Brazil's Cerrado grasslands and the Pantanal, the largest seasonal swamp on Earth. The plains have pronounced wet and dry seasons, and the creatures of these ancient habitats have evolved survival strategies to withstand the extremes of drought, fire and flood. The main grazers here are termites, making the Cerrado seem empty in comparison to Africa’s savannah. Specialist termite eaters include the giant and collared anteaters and armadillos. By the end of the dry season, even the Pantanal begins to dry out. Fish and caimans are trapped in muddy pools and capybaras must move in search of water. A female jaguar with two cubs is shown chasing vultures off a cattle carcass. The first storms ignite the Cerrado as lightning strikes the tinder-dry grass. These annual fires help return nutrients to the soil, and trigger plants to release their seeds. The Pantanal is home to over 700 species of bird, including the rare hyacinth macaw and vast flocks of wood storks, which time their breeding to coincide with the floods. Young capybaras are vulnerable to attacks from anacondas. As the Cerrado flowers bloom with the arrival of the rains, rheas and pampas deer feed alongside one another. A playful greeting between maned wolves is filmed using night-vision cameras. On humid nights, winged termites leave their mounds in their millions to start new colonies. The final scenes show the mounds illuminated with the lights of bioluminescent beetle grubs.
4	"Andes"	27 November 2000
In the fourth programme, the viewer is taken on a journey along the Andes, the spine of the continent. In the northern tropics, spectacled bears feed on bromeliads in the cloud forests and on the puya flower spikes in the alpine grasslands of the Páramo. At these altitudes hummingbirds find it difficult to hover, so those such as the Andean hillstar perch on flowers as they drink the nectar. The Andes are a young range in geological terms, and volcanic activity is still present. The mountain-building forces have thrust up the altiplano, a high, dry desert with geyser fields, caustic lakes and little vegetation. Vicuñas and vizcachas have adapted to the thin air and large daily temperature variation. Despite the treeless environment, even woodpeckers are found here; the Andean flicker nests underground. The geysers and hot springs never freeze so flamingos here can stay year-round, but those on the salt lakes must migrate to lower altitudes to escape the winter. Late-hatching chicks can be trapped by the ice before they can fly. The final part of the programme features Patagonia, where the mountains are lower but closer to Antarctica. The ice fields are so vast they generate their own glaciers and weather systems, blasting the remnants of ancient volcanoes with cold winds. Guanacos, gray foxes and pumas are filmed in both winter and summer. Birds featured include spring migrants buff-necked ibises and great grebes, while the resident Andean condors are big enough to see foxes off a carcass.
5	"Amazon Jungle"	11 December 2000
The paradise tanager, a rainforest species Episode five covers the Amazon rainforest, home to more varieties of plants and animals than anywhere else on Earth. Despite the profusion of life, finding food can be a challenge for both people and animals. Many plants have poisonous leaves, seeds and fruit to protect themselves against attack. The Huaorani, a native tribe, practise low-impact hunting using blowpipes. They make darts, using downy kapok fibre (from the seedpods of Ceiba pentandra trees) for the flights, and dip the tips in natural toxins. Some animals eat only the youngest shoots, which contain less poison. Others such as white-faced sakis have developed special digestive systems to cope with their toxic diet. At a clay lick, spider monkeys risk descending to the forest floor to eat clay, which helps to neutralise the toxins. They are not alone – other visitors include a brocket deer, white-lipped peccaries and parrots. At night, the flooded lick is visited by the shy Brazilian tapir. Red-and-green macaws take clay at special places along the rivers, a great social occasion for the birds. Army ants are shown overwhelming their prey, but some creatures have developed clever ways to avoid detection. Antbirds are reliant on the ants to flush out fleeing insects. In the canopy, bromeliads are a vital water source for all tree dwellers, including woolly monkeys and the dazzling paradise tanager. Each plant can store up to ten litres and is a microcosm of life. Golden-mantled tamarins are successful because they are supreme opportunists, eating fruits and insects and living in tightly knit groups.
6	"Penguin Shores"	18 December 2000
A colony of gentoo penguins in the Falkland Islands The final programme begins in the Falkland Islands, where thousands of rockhopper penguins negotiate the treacherous wave-swept coast and sea cliffs as they come ashore to breed. Huge shoals of krill live in the cold, oxygen-rich waters of the surrounding ocean. Black-browed albatross, gentoo penguins and king cormorants are among the millions of seabirds drawn here to take advantage of the nutrient-rich sea. In summer, pods of killer whales arrive to hunt penguins, using techniques learned from previous generations. Animals of the Southern Ocean visit the deep-water fjords around the southern tip of the continent. Magellanic penguins nest in the undergrowth, but must evade the predatory sea lions which patrol the kelp forests offshore. Peale’s dolphins are filmed in the Straits of Magellan. The cold Humboldt Current carries nutrients far up the west coast of South America, but on land the temperate forests give way to the driest desert on Earth. Off the coast at Paracas, huge shoals of anchovies gather. These attract seabirds, Humboldt penguins and larger predators such as sea lions. At the Galápagos Islands, warm and cold ocean currents meet, attracting new species. Hammerhead sharks gather in shoals hundreds strong to feed, breed and socialise. Sperm whales also arrive to breed, with the bulls establishing dominance over rivals by head-butting and tooth rasping. The volcanic islands have their own unique flora and fauna due to their isolation, including flightless cormorants, marine iguanas and Galápagos finches. The cold Humboldt Current has even put a penguin on the equator.

== Merchandise ==
A book, soundtrack CD and DVD were all released to accompany the TV series:

- A Region 2 and 4, 2-disc DVD set was released on 18 July 2005 (BBCDVD1707) and features all six full-length episodes along with a bonus 30 minute documentary, Wildlife on One: Giant Otters. Andes to Amazon is one of four series which comprise the Region 1 DVD box set BBC Atlas of the Natural World: Western Hemisphere released on 31 October 2006.
- The accompanying book, Andes to Amazon: A Guide to Wild South America by Michael Bright, was published by BBC Books on 2 November 2000 in a hardcover edition (ISBN 0-563-53705-1) and on 4 April 2002 in a paperback edition (ISBN 0-563-53495-8).
- On 20 November 2000 a CD was released with a compilation of the incidental music in Andes to Amazon.

== See also ==
- BBC Atlas of the Natural World, a 2006-07 compilation series for North America
- Tiputini Biodiversity Station – where some of the Amazon scenes were shot.
