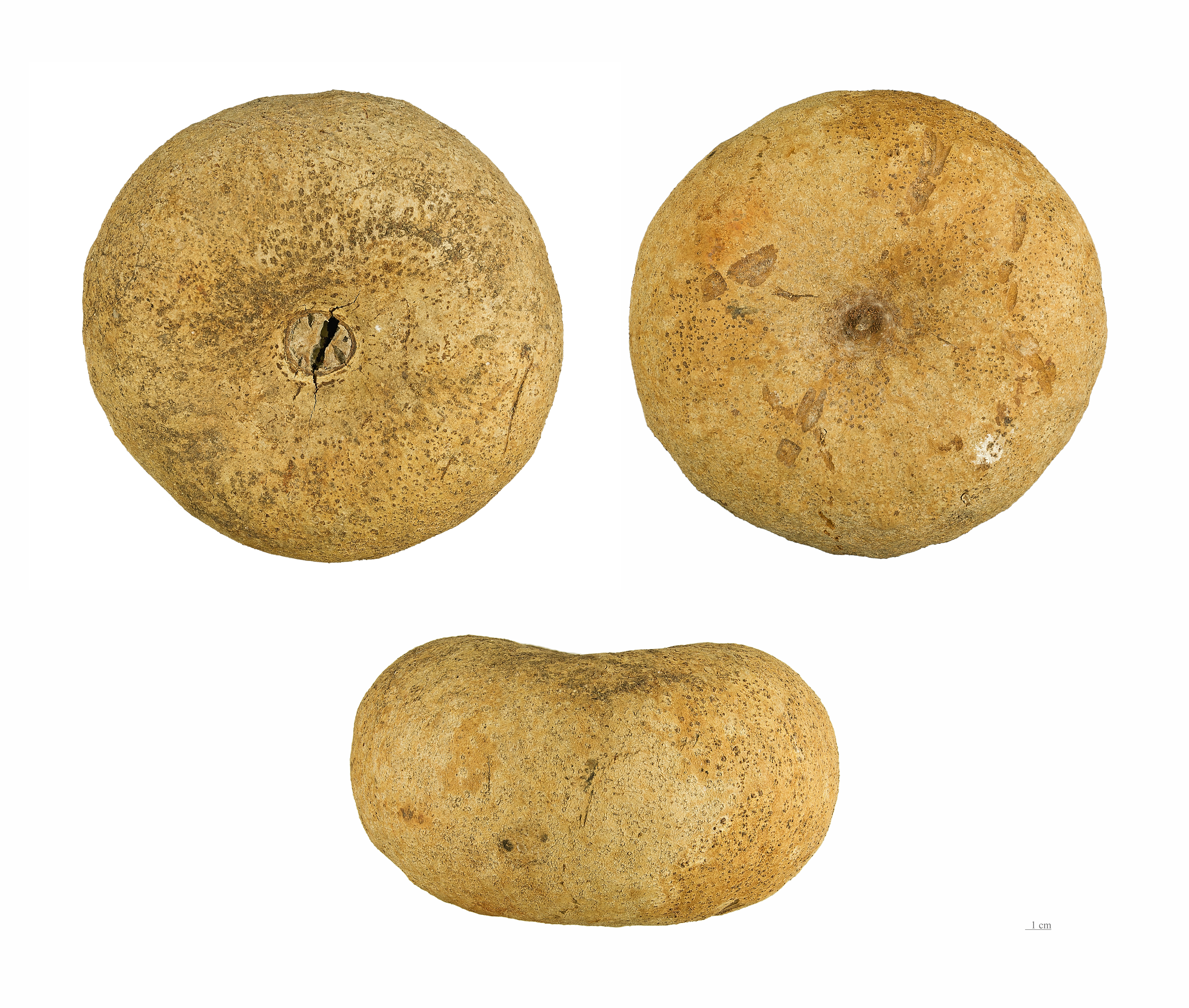
- Omphalocarpum elatum, fruit

Scientific classification
- Kingdom: Plantae
- Clade: Tracheophytes
- Clade: Angiosperms
- Clade: Eudicots
- Clade: Asterids
- Order: Ericales
- Family: Sapotaceae
- Subfamily: Chrysophylloideae
- Genus: Omphalocarpum; P.Beauv. 1800

Synonyms
- Ituridendron De Wild.; Vanderystia De Wild.

= Omphalocarpum =

Navel fruit

Genus of trees

Omphalocarpum (common name navel fruit) is a genus of plants belonging to the family Sapotaceae. It was first described in 1800 by Palisot de Beauvois. The genus is native to tropical Africa.

The following species are recognised by Kew.

1. O. adolfi-friederici Engl. & K.Krause, Bot. Jahrb. Syst. 49: 383 (1913).
2. O. agglomeratum De Wild., Pl. Bequaert. 4: 77 (1926).
3. O. ahia A.Chev., Veg. Ut. Afr. Trop. Franç. 5: 244 (1909).
4. O. bequaertii De Wild., Rev. Zool. Bot. Africaines 7(Suppl.): 4 (1919).
5. O. boyankombo De Wild., Pl. Bequaert. 4: 81 (1926).
6. O. bracteatum Baudon, Ann. Inst. Bot.-Géol. Colon. Marseille, IV, 7: 29 (1929).
7. O. brieyi De Wild., Rev. Zool. Bot. Africaines 7(Suppl.): 6 (1919).
8. O. busange De Wild., Pl. Bequaert. 4: 84 (1926).
9. O. cabrae De Wild., Miss. Ém. Laurent 1: 421 (1907).
10. O. claessensii De Wild., Pl. Bequaert. 4: 86 (1926).
11. O. elatum Miers, Trans. Linn. Soc. London, Bot. 1: 16 (1875).
12. O. ghesquierei De Wild., Pl. Bequaert. 4: 87 (1926).
13. O. lecomteanum Pierre ex Engl., Monogr. Afrik. Pflanzen-Fam. 8: 15 (1904).
14. O. lescrauwaetii De Wild., Rev. Zool. Bot. Africaines 7(Suppl.): 8 (1919).
15. O. lujai De Wild., Rev. Zool. Bot. Africaines 7(Suppl.): 10 (1919).
16. O. massoko Baudon, Ann. Inst. Bot.-Géol. Colon. Marseille, IV, 7: 27 (1929).
17. O. mayumbense Greves, J. Bot. 65(Suppl. 2): 70 (1927).
18. O. mortehanii De Wild., Rev. Zool. Bot. Africaines 7(Suppl.): 11 (1919).
19. O. ogouense Pierre ex Engl., Monogr. Afrik. Pflanzen-Fam. 8: 17 (1904).
20. O. pachysteloides Mildbr. ex Hutch. & Dalziel, Fl. W. Trop. Afr. 2: 13 (1931).
21. O. pedicellatum De Wild., Rev. Zool. Bot. Africaines 7(Suppl.): 12 (1919).
22. O. procerum P.Beauv., Fl. Oware 1: 10 (1805).
23. O. sankuruense De Wild., Miss. Ém. Laurent 1: 419 (1907).
24. O. sphaerocarpum De Wild., Rev. Zool. Bot. Africaines 7(Suppl.): 14 (1919).
25. O. strombocarpum Y.B.Harv. & Lovett, Kew Bull. 54: 198 (1999).
26. O. torosum Baudon, Ann. Inst. Bot.-Géol. Colon. Marseille, IV, 7: 30 (1929).
27. O. vermoesenii De Wild., Pl. Bequaert. 4: 97 (1926).
