= Goualougo Triangle =

The Goualougo Triangle is a 100-square-mile (260 km^{2}) region on the southern end of the Nouabale-Ndoki National Park, located in the Republic of Congo, in Central Africa. The northern Congo lowland forest ecosystem of the park is one of the most intact fauna habitats of its type in Africa. Populations of several endangered or threatened species are found here, including forest elephants, western lowland gorillas and a high density of common chimpanzees.

The discovery of a native chimpanzee (Pan troglodytes) population - and, most importantly, of their unhabituated behavior - in the Goualougo Triangle region helped persuade the Congolese government, and the local logging company, to preserve the pristine habitat.

The Goualougo Triangle has been dubbed "The Last Place on Earth" by National Geographic magazine, and Time describes it as the "Last Eden."

The chimpanzees of the Goualougo Triangle have had virtually no contact with people. Bomassa village, 34 miles (55 km) away, is the closest human settlement. On initial contact, the chimpanzees still show curiosity and interest in human observers, unlike those at other field research sites. This presents an invaluable opportunity for close observation of a chimpanzee community, one heretofore undisturbed by humans. Analysis of the ecological and geographical requirements for these chimpanzees is essential to developing a management plan to insure conservation of the species.

The Republic of Congo government, in collaboration with the New York based Wildlife Conservation Society (WCS), initiated the Nouabale-Ndoki/Congo Forest Conservation Project in 1991. When the Nouabale-Ndoki National Park was subsequently created in 1993, the Goualougo Triangle was initially left out, as a part of a logging concession. Initial surveys of the Goualougo Triangle, comprising a forest rich in mahogany and other valuable hardwoods, were conducted that same year by Michael Fay, a conservationist with the WCS.

The encroachment of loggers and bush-meat poachers in areas adjacent to the Nouabale-Ndoki National Park imperils conservation efforts throughout the region. Because logging will continue in the vicinity of the park, it is essential for key conservation areas to be identified and protected, before such encroachment permanently compromises the forests and threatens the integrity of the park itself.

In July 2001, representatives of the WCS, the Congolese government, and the logging company - which owned legal rights to the Goualougo Triangle - announced the area was to be annexed to the park, so its intact ecosystem and undisturbed wildlife habitats would be protected in perpetuity.

Field research enabled by the annexation may lead to better models of human evolution, because the chimpanzees will be protected from any other human interference. Data is being gathered on social organization, feeding ecology and behavior. The chimpanzees of the Goualougo Triangle still enjoy the possibility of an unbounded and genetically robust future.

== See also ==
- Jane Goodall
- Louis Leakey
