= Wainwright Prize =

U.K. literary award

- Awarded for: Writing on nature, conservation, and the environment
- Country: United Kingdom
- First award: 2014; 12 years ago
- Website: wainwrightprize.com

The Wainwright Prize is a literary prize awarded annually for the best works of nature, conservation, and environmental writing. Beginning in 2025 there were six categories: Nature Writing, Conservation Writing, Illustrative Books, Children's Fiction, Children's Non-Fiction, and Children's Picture Books. Each has separate longlists and judging panels. Category winners become eligible to win the overall prizes, the Wainwright Prize Book of the Year and the Wainwright Children's Prize Book of the Year. Nominations are restricted to books published in the UK.

== History ==
The prize celebrates the legacy of British guidebook writer Alfred Wainwright. It was established in 2013 by Frances Lincoln Publishers and The Wainwright Society, in association with the National Trust. Originally the prize was sponsored by Thwaites Brewery, who produced a beer called Wainwright Ale and was later sponsored by Marston's Brewery, who took over Thwaites' production of Wainwright Golden Beer, and thus the prize was sometimes referred to as The Wainwright Golden Beer Book Prize.

In 2020 the prize was no longer sponsored, but was supported by an anonymous benefactor and was "in association with the National Trust". Also in 2020 the prize was split into the Wainwright Prize for UK Nature Writing and the Wainwright Prize for Writing on Global Conservation, with separate longlists and judging panels. In 2021 the Kendal papermakers James Cropper plc became the prize's "headline sponsors" in a three-year agreement. From 2022 until 2024, the prizes were known as the James Cropper Wainwright Prizes. A prize for writing for children was introduced in 2022, with the three prizes newly titled the James Cropper Wainwright Prize for Nature Writing, the James Cropper Wainwright Prize for Writing on Conservation and the James Cropper Wainwright Prize for Children's Writing on Nature and Conservation.

In 2024 it was announced that the prize would be seeking new sponsorship. As of July 2025 the prize's partners were: the RSPB, the Wainwright Society, The Wildlife Trusts, the National Trust, Frances Lincoln, World Book Day, National Geographic Kids, and marketing company Agile. In 2026 there were four additional partners: Responsible Travel, the National Literacy Trust, National Book Tokens and Plantlife.

The prize was first awarded in 2014 to Hugh Thomson for his The Green Road into the Trees: A Walk Through England. The winner received a cheque for £5,000. With the introduction of two prizes in 2020 the prize money was shared between the two winners, and in 2022 it was increased to £7,500 to be shared between the three winners. With the prize having been restructured in 2025, the two overall winners received £2,500, while each other category winner received £500, for a total of £7,000 prize money.

== Winners and shortlisted titles ==
In the following tables, the years correspond to the date of the ceremony, rather than when the book was first published. Entries with a blue background and an asterisk (*) next to the writer's name have won the award; those with a pale background are the other nominees on the shortlist.

* Winners

=== 2014–2019: One prize ===
Year	Author	Book	Publisher	Ref.
2014	Hugh Thomson *	The Green Road into the Trees: A Walk Through England	Windmill	
2014	Simon Armitage	Walking Home	Faber & Faber	
2014	Patrick Barkham	Badgerlands	Granta	
2014	Charlotte Higgins	Under Another Sky	Vintage	
2014	Robert Macfarlane	The Old Ways	Penguin	
2014	Esther Woolfson	Field Notes from a Hidden City	Granta	
2015	John Lewis-Stempel *	Meadowland	Penguin	
2015	Richard Askwith	Running Free: A Runner's Journey Back to Nature	Yellow Jersey	
2015	William Atkins	The Moor	Faber & Faber	
2015	Mark Cocker	Claxton: Field Notes from a Small Planet	Vintage	
2015	Helen Macdonald	H is for Hawk	Vintage	
2015	Philip Marsden	Rising Ground: A Search for the Spirit of Place	Granta	
2016	Amy Liptrot *	The Outrun	Canongate	
2016	Rob Cowen	Common Ground	Windmill	
2016	Robert Macfarlane	Landmarks	Penguin	
2016	Michael McCarthy	The Moth Snowstorm	John Murray Press	
2016	Katharine Norbury	The Fish Ladder	Bloomsbury	
2016	James Rebanks	The Shepherd's Life	Penguin	
2017	John Lewis-Stempel *	Where Poppies Blow	Weidenfeld and Nicolson	
2017	Madeleine Bunting	Love of Country	Granta	
2017	Simon Cooper	The Otters' Tale	William Collins	
2017	John Lewis-Stempel	The Running Hare	Black Swan	
2017	Stephen Moss	Wild Kingdom	Vintage	
2017	Christopher Somerville	The January Man (book)	Black Swan	
2017	Clover Stroud	The Wild Other	Hodder & Stoughton	
2018	Adam Nicolson *	The Seabird's Cry	William Collins	
2018	Neil Ansell	The Last Wilderness	Headline	
2018	Alys Fowler	Hidden Nature	Hodder & Stoughton	
2018	John Grindrod	Outskirts	Hodder & Stoughton	
2018	John Lister-Kaye	The Dun Cow Rib	Canongate	
2018	Robert Macfarlane and Jackie Morris	The Lost Words	Hamish Hamilton	
2018	Raynor Winn	The Salt Path	Penguin	
2019	Robert Macfarlane *	Underland	Hamish Hamilton	
2019	Julia Blackburn	Time Song	Vintage	
2019	Juliet Blaxland	The Easternmost House	Sandstone	
2019	Mark Cocker	Our Place	Vintage	
2019	Kate Humble	Thinking on My Feet	Octopus Books	
2019	Isabella Tree	Wilding	Picador	
2019	Luke Turner	Out of the Woods	Weidenfeld and Nicolson	

=== 2020–2021: Two prizes ===
Year	Author	Book	Publisher	Ref.
2020: Global Conservation	Benedict Macdonald *	Rebirding: Restoring Britain's Wildlife	Pelagic Publishing	
2020: Global Conservation	Chris Goodall	What We Need to Do Now	Profile Books	
2020: Global Conservation	Julian Hoffman	Irreplaceable	Penguin	
2020: Global Conservation	Helen Pilcher	Life Changing: How Humans Are Altering Life on Earth	Bloomsbury Sigma	
2020: Global Conservation	Jeremy Purseglove	Working With Nature	Profile Books	
2020: Global Conservation	Carolyn Steel	Sitopia: How Food Can Save the World	Vintage	
2020: UK Nature Writing	Dara McAnulty *	Diary of a Young Naturalist	Ebury Press	
2020: UK Nature Writing	Lamorna Ash	Dark, Salt, Clear: Life in a Cornish Fishing Town	Bloomsbury	
2020: UK Nature Writing	David Gange	The Frayed Atlantic Edge	William Collins	
2020: UK Nature Writing	Patrick Laurie	Native: Life in a Vanishing Landscape	Birlinn General	
2020: UK Nature Writing	Mike Parker	On the Red Hill	Windmill	
2020: UK Nature Writing	Jini Reddy	Wanderland: A Search for Magic in the Landscape	Bloomsbury Wildlife	
2020: UK Nature Writing	Brigit Strawbridge Howard	Dancing with Bees: A Journey Back to Nature	Chelsea Green	
2021: Global Conservation	Merlin Sheldrake *	Entangled Life	Penguin Random House	
2021: Global Conservation	David Attenborough	A Life on Our Planet	Ebury Press	
2021: Global Conservation	Cal Flyn	Islands of Abandonment	William Collins	
2021: Global Conservation	Rebecca Giggs	Fathoms: The World in the Whale	Scribe Publications	
2021: Global Conservation	Dieter Helm	Net Zero: How We Stop Causing Climate Change	William Collins	
2021: Global Conservation	Elizabeth Kolbert	Under a White Sky	Vintage	
2021: UK Nature Writing	James Rebanks *	English Pastoral: An Inheritance	Penguin	
2021: UK Nature Writing	Charles Foster	The Screaming Sky	Little Toller Books	
2021: UK Nature Writing	Charlie Gilmour	Featherhood	Orion	
2021: UK Nature Writing	Marc Hamer	Seed to Dust	Vintage	
2021: UK Nature Writing	Kerri ní Dochartaigh	Thin Places	Canongate	
2021: UK Nature Writing	Anita Sethi	I Belong Here	Bloomsbury Wildlife	
2021: UK Nature Writing	Raynor Winn	The Wild Silence	Penguin	

=== 2022–2024: Addition of a children's prize ===
Year	Author	Book	Publisher	Ref.
2022: Nature Writing	James Aldred *	Goshawk Summer: A New Forest Season Unlike Any Other	Elliott & Thompson	
2022: Nature Writing	Nicola Chester	On Gallows Down: Place, Protest and Belonging	Chelsea Green	
2022: Nature Writing	Matthew Green	Shadowlands: A Journey Through Lost Britain	Faber & Faber	
2022: Nature Writing	Amy Liptrot	The Instant	Canongate	
2022: Nature Writing	Anna Fleming	Time on Rock: A Climber's Route into the Mountains	Canongate	
2022: Nature Writing	Thomas Halliday	Otherlands: A World in the Making	Allen Lane	
2022: Writing on Conservation	Dan Saladino *	Eating to Extinction: The World's Rarest Foods and Why We Need to Save Them	Jonathan Cape	
2022: Writing on Conservation	Alice Bell	Our Biggest Experiment: A History of the Climate Crisis	Bloomsbury Sigma	
2022: Writing on Conservation	Dave Goulson	Silent Earth: Averting the Insect Apocalypse	Vintage	
2022: Writing on Conservation	Oliver Milman	The Insect Crisis: The Fall of the Tiny Empires That Run the World	Atlantic Books	
2022: Writing on Conservation	George Monbiot	Regenesis: Feeding the World Without Devouring the Planet	Allen Lane	
2022: Writing on Conservation	Ben Rawlence	The Treeline: The Last Forest and the Future of Life on Earth	Jonathan Cape	
2022: Writing on Conservation	Lee Schofield	Wild Fell: Fighting for Nature on a Lake District Hill Farm	Doubleday	
2022: Children's Writing on Nature and Conservation	Rob Sears; Illustrated by Tom Sears *	The Biggest Footprint: Eight Billion Humans. One Clumsy Giant	Canongate	
2022: Children's Writing on Nature and Conservation	Katya Balen; Illustrated by Angela Harding	October, October	Bloomsbury Children's Books	
2022: Children's Writing on Nature and Conservation	Nicola Davies; Illustrated by Jenni Desmond	One World: 24 Hours on Planet Earth	Walker Books	
2022: Children's Writing on Nature and Conservation	Kiran Millwood Hargrave; Illustrated by Tom de Freston	Julia and the Shark	Orion Children's Books	
2022: Children's Writing on Nature and Conservation	Melissa Harrison; Illustrated by Angela Harding	By Rowan and Yew	Chicken House	
2022: Children's Writing on Nature and Conservation	Ben Lerwill; Illustrated by Kaja Kajfež	Around the World in 80 Trees	Welbeck	
2022: Children's Writing on Nature and Conservation	Dara McAnulty; Illustrated by Barry Falls	Wild Child: A Journey Through Nature	Macmillan Children's Books	
2023: Nature Writing	Amy-Jane Beer *	The Flow: Rivers, Water and Wildness	Bloomsbury	
2023: Nature Writing	Elizabeth-Jane Burnett	Twelve Words for Moss	Allen Lane	
2023: Nature Writing	Stephen Moss	Ten Birds That Changed the World	Faber	
2023: Nature Writing	Dorthe Nors; Translated by Caroline Waight	A Line in the World: A Year on the North Sea Coast	Pushkin	
2023: Nature Writing	Katherine Rundell; Illustrated by Talya Baldwin	The Golden Mole: And Other Living Treasure	Faber	
2023: Nature Writing	Amanda Thomson	Belonging: Natural Histories of Place, Identity and Home	Canongate	
2023: Writing on Conservation	Guy Shrubsole *	The Lost Rainforests of Britain	William Collins	
2023: Writing on Conservation	Keggie Carew	Beastly: A New History of Animals and Us	Canongate	
2023: Writing on Conservation	Charles Clover	Rewilding the Sea: How to Save Our Oceans	Ebury	
2023: Writing on Conservation	Sarah Langford	Rooted: How Regenerative Farming Can Change the World	Viking	
2023: Writing on Conservation	Fiona Mathews and Tim Kendall	Black Ops and Beaver Bombing: Adventures with Britain's Wild Mammals	Oneworld	
2023: Writing on Conservation	Gaia Vince	Nomad Century: How to Survive the Climate Upheaval	Allen Lane	
2023: Children's Writing on Nature and Conservation	Kiran Millwood Hargrave; Illustrated by Tom de Freston *	Leila and the Blue Fox	Chicken House	
2023: Children's Writing on Nature and Conservation	Nicola Davies; Illustrated by Emily Sutton	Protecting the Planet: The Season of Giraffes	Walker Books	
2023: Children's Writing on Nature and Conservation	Olaf Falafel	Blobfish	Walker Books	
2023: Children's Writing on Nature and Conservation	M. G. Leonard	Spark	Walker Books	
2023: Children's Writing on Nature and Conservation	Dara McAnulty; Illustrated by Barry Falls	A Wild Child's Book of Birds	Macmillan Children's Books	
2023: Children's Writing on Nature and Conservation	Anna Wilson; Illustrated by Sarah Massini	Grandpa and the Kingfisher	Nosy Crow	
2024: Nature Writing	Michael Malay *	Late Light: The Secret Wonders of a Disappearing World	Manila Press, Bonnier Books	
2024: Nature Writing	Marchelle Farrell	Uprooting: From the Caribbean to the Countryside	Canongate	
2024: Nature Writing	Kat Hill	Bothy: In Search of Simple Shelter	William Collins	
2024: Nature Writing	Alastair Humphreys	Local: A Search for Nearby Nature and Wildness	Faber	
2024: Nature Writing	Jessica J. Lee	Dispersals: On Plants, Borders and Belonging	Hamish Hamilton	
2024: Nature Writing	Olivia Laing	The Garden Against Time: In Search of a Common Paradise	Picador	
2024: Nature Writing	Rebecca Smith	Rural: The Lives of the Working Class Countryside	William Collins	
2024: Writing on Conservation	Helen Czerski *	Blue Machine: How the Ocean Shapes Our World	Torva, Transworld	
2024: Writing on Conservation	Oliver Franklin-Wallis	Wasteland: The Dirty Truth About What We Throw Away, Where It Goes, and Why It Matters	Simon & Schuster	
2024: Writing on Conservation	Chantal Lyons	Groundbreakers: The Return of Britain's Wild Boar	Bloomsbury Wildlife	
2024: Writing on Conservation	Tori Tsui	It's Not Just You: How to Navigate Eco-Anxiety and the Climate Crisis	Simon & Schuster, Gallery Books	
2024: Writing on Conservation	John Vaillant	Fire Weather: A True Story from a Hotter World	Sceptre, Hodder & Stoughton	
2024: Writing on Conservation	Sophie Yeo	Nature's Ghosts: The World We Lost and How to Bring it Back	HarperNorth/ HarperCollins	
2024: Children's Writing on Nature and Conservation	Katya Balen *	Foxlight	Bloomsbury Children's	
2024: Children's Writing on Nature and Conservation	Giselle Clarkson	The Observologist	Gecko Press	
2024: Children's Writing on Nature and Conservation	Eoin Colfer and Andrew Donkin; Illustrated by Giovanni Rigano	Global	Hodder Children's Books	
2024: Children's Writing on Nature and Conservation	Nicola Davies; Illustrated by Jackie Morris	Skrimsli	Firefly Press	
2024: Children's Writing on Nature and Conservation	David Lindo; Illustrated by Sara Boccaccini Meadows	Fly: A Child's Guide to Birds and Where to Spot Them	Magic Cat Publishing	
2024: Children's Writing on Nature and Conservation	Kiran Millwood Hargrave	Geomancer: In the Shadow of the Wolf Queen	Orion Children's Books	
2024: Children's Writing on Nature and Conservation	Katherine Rundell	Impossible Creatures	Bloomsbury Children's	
2024: Children's Writing on Nature and Conservation	Isabella Tree; Illustrated by Angela Harding	Wilding: How to Bring Wildlife Back	Macmillan Children's Books	

=== 2025–: Six prize categories ===
In 2025, the Wainwright Prize was restructured to award books across six categories, each falling under one of two overall Prizes: the Wainwright Prize Book of the Year and the Wainwright Children's Prize Book of the Year. Only winners in individual categories are eligible to win the overall prizes. In the following table, a blue background intes a category winner, a green background indicates an overall winner and a pale background indicates a shortlisted nominee.

Submissions for the 2025 prizes closed on 6 March 2025. The longlists were announced in July 2025; the shortlists were announced on 5 August and the winners were announced on 10 September.

The 2026 prizes uses the same six categories. Submissions closed on 27 February 2026, and the winners were announced on 17 September 2026.

* Category winners ‡ Overall winners

Year	Author	Book	Publisher	Ref.
2025: Nature Writing	Chloe Dalton ‡	Raising Hare	Canongate	
2025: Nature Writing	Jason Allen-Paisant	The Possibility of Tenderness	Hutchinson Heinemann	
2025: Nature Writing	Yuvan Aves	Intertidal	Bonnier Books	
2025: Nature Writing	Merlin Hanbury-Tenison	Our Oaken Bones	Witness Books	
2025: Nature Writing	Paul Lamb	Of Thorn & Briar	Simon & Schuster	
2025: Nature Writing	Richard Mabey	The Accidental Garden	Profile Books	
2025: Nature Writing	Callum Robinson	Ingrained	Penguin	
2025: Conservation Writing	Guy Shrubsole *	The Lie of the Land	William Collins	
2025: Conservation Writing	David Farrier	Nature's Genius	Canongate	
2025: Conservation Writing	Robert Macfarlane	Is a River Alive?	Hamish Hamilton	
2025: Conservation Writing	Alice Mah	Red Pockets	Allen Lane	
2025: Conservation Writing	Friederike Otto; Translated by Sarah Pybus	Climate Injustice	Greystone Books	
2025: Conservation Writing	Sophy Roberts	A Training School for Elephants	Doubleday	
2025: Conservation Writing	Helen Scales	What the Wild Sea Can Be	Atlantic Books	
2025: Illustrative Books	George Steinmetz, Joel K. Bourne Jr. and Michael Pollan *	Feed the Planet	Abrams	
2025: Illustrative Books	John McEwen; Illustrated by Carry Akroyd	Swoop Sing Perch Paddle	Bloomsbury Wildlife	
2025: Illustrative Books	Melissa Harrison; Illustrated by Amanda Dilworth	Homecoming	Weidenfeld & Nicolson	
2025: Illustrative Books	Peter Kuper	Insectopolis	W. W. Norton & Company	
2025: Illustrative Books	Quintin Lake	The Perimeter	Hutchinson Heinemann, Penguin	
2025: Illustrative Books	Richard Shimell	Trees in Winter	Sphere	
2025: The Children's Wainwright Prize for Fiction	Brogen Murphy *	Wildlands	Puffin Books	
2025: The Children's Wainwright Prize for Fiction	Katya Balen	Ghostlines	Bloomsbury Children's	
2025: The Children's Wainwright Prize for Fiction	Hannah Gold; Illustrated by Levi Pinfold	Turtle Moon	HarperCollins	
2025: The Children's Wainwright Prize for Fiction	Julia Green; Illustrated by Pam Smy	Ettie and the Midnight Pool	David Fickling Books	
2025: The Children's Wainwright Prize for Fiction	Kengo Kurimoto	Wildful	Pushkin Children's Books	
2025: The Children's Wainwright Prize for Fiction	Lui Sit; Illustrated by David Dean	Land of the Last Wildcat	Macmillan Children's Books	
2025: The Children's Wainwright Prize for Non-Fiction	Ben Hoare; Illustrated by Nina Chakrabarti *	University of Cambridge: Think Big: Secrets of Bees	Nosy Crow	
2025: The Children's Wainwright Prize for Non-Fiction	Moira Butterfield; Illustrated by Jesús Verona	National Trust: Look What I Found by the River	Nosy Crow	
2025: The Children's Wainwright Prize for Non-Fiction	Jules Howard; Illustrated by Gavin Scott	MEGA	Nosy Crow	
2025: The Children's Wainwright Prize for Non-Fiction	Gavin Pretor-Pinney; Illustrated by William Grill	Cloudspotting for Beginners	Particular Books	
2025: The Children's Wainwright Prize for Non-Fiction	Sharon Wismer; Illustrated by Terri Po	Wildlife in the Balances	Flying Eye Books	
2025: The Children's Wainwright Prize for Non-Fiction	Hamza Yassin; Illustrated by Louise Forshaw	Hamza’s Wild World	Macmillan Children's Books	
2025: The Children's Wainwright Prize for Picture Books	Lanisha Butterfield; Illustrated by Hoang Giang ‡	Flower Block	Puffin Books	
2025: The Children's Wainwright Prize for Picture Books	Emily Gravett	Bothered By Bugs	Too Hoots	
2025: The Children's Wainwright Prize for Picture Books	Stephen Hogtun	HERD	Bloomsbury Children's Books	
2025: The Children's Wainwright Prize for Picture Books	Robert Macfarlane and Johnny Flynn; Illustrated by Emily Sutton	The World to Come	Magic Cat Publishing	
2025: The Children's Wainwright Prize for Picture Books	Isabel Thomas; Illustrated by Daniel Egnéus	Frog	Bloomsbury Children's Books	
2025: The Children's Wainwright Prize for Picture Books	Benjamin Zephaniah; Illustrated by Melissa Castrillon	Leave the Trees, Please	Magic Cat Publishing	
2025: The Children's Wainwright Prize for Picture Books	Yuval Zommer	The Wild	Oxford University Press	
2026: Nature Writing	Luke Barley *	Ancient: Reviving the Woods That Made Britain	Profile Books	
2026: Nature Writing	Nicola Chester	Ghosts of the Farm	Chelsea Green	
2026: Nature Writing	James Fox	Craftland	Penguin	
2026: Nature Writing	Lucy Lapwing	Love is a Toad	Blink Publishing	
2026: Nature Writing	Harriet Rix	The Genius of Trees	Vintage	
2026: Nature Writing	Fiona Robertson Illustrated by Philip Harris	Stone Lands	Robinson	
2026: Nature Writing	Michael J. Warren	The Cuckoo's lea	Bloomsbury Wildlife	
2026: Conservation Writing	Cal Flyn *	The Savage Landscape	William Collins	
2026: Conservation Writing	Rose George	Every Last Fish	Granta Books	
2026: Conservation Writing	Dave Goulson	Eat the Planet Well	Jonathan Cape	
2026: Conservation Writing	Joe Harkness	Neurodivergent, by Nature	Bloomsbury Wildlife	
2026: Conservation Writing	Julia Shaw	Green Crime	Canongate Books	
2026: Conservation Writing	Suzanne Simard	When the Forest Breathes	Allen Lane	
2026: Conservation Writing	Scott Weidensaul	The Return of the Oystercatcher	Picador	
2026: Illustrative Books	Jackie Morris and Robert Macfarlane ‡	The Book of Birds	Hamish Hamilton	
2026: Illustrative Books	Yann Arthus-Bertrand and Bill François	Freshwater	Abrams	
2026: Illustrative Books	David Gilbey, Roo Lewis and Molly Martin	Waterlands	Weidenfeld & Nicolson	
2026: Illustrative Books	Jackie Morris and Tamsin Abbott	Wild Folk	Chelsea Green	
2026: Illustrative Books	Alison Pouliot	Funga Obscura	Uni. of Chicago Press	
2026: Illustrative Books	Christopher Woods	In Botanical Time	Chelsea Green	
2026: The Children's Wainwright Prize for Fiction	Caryl Lewis *	The Danger of Small Things		
2026: The Children's Wainwright Prize for Fiction	Eilish Fisher Illustrated by David Rooney	Ghostlines		
2026: The Children's Wainwright Prize for Fiction	Cornelia Funke and Tammi Hartung Illustrated by Melissa Castrillón	The Gren Kingdom		
2026: The Children's Wainwright Prize for Fiction	Hannah Gold Illustrated by Levi Pinfold	Ettie and the Midnight Pool		
2026: The Children's Wainwright Prize for Fiction	Sophie Kirtley	Swanfall		
2026: The Children's Wainwright Prize for Fiction	M. G. Leonard Illustrated by Polly Dunbar	The Adventures of Portly the Otter		
2026: The Children's Wainwright Prize for Fiction	Anthony McGowan Illustrated by Keith Robinson	Swanfall		
2026: The Children's Wainwright Prize for Fiction	Piers Torday Illustrated by Matthew Taylor Wilson	Tree Thing		
2026: The Children's Wainwright Prize for Non-Fiction	Thomas Halliday Illustrated by Gavin Scott ‡	Otherlands		
2026: The Children's Wainwright Prize for Non-Fiction	Jess French	An Anthology of Remarkable Bugs		
2026: The Children's Wainwright Prize for Non-Fiction	Josie George; Illustrated by Becky Thorns	Letters from Wonderland		
2026: The Children's Wainwright Prize for Non-Fiction	Ben Hoare	Shapes of Nature		
2026: The Children's Wainwright Prize for Non-Fiction	Jules Howard; Illustrated by Gordy Wright	Choose Your Own Evolution		
2026: The Children's Wainwright Prize for Non-Fiction	Dara McAnulty Illustrated by Barry Falls	A Wild Child's Guideto Nature at Night		
2026: The Children's Wainwright Prize for Non-Fiction	Kate Winter	The Cave Explorer		
2026: The Children's Wainwright Prize for Picture Books	Annie Booker *	The Great Bear		
2026: The Children's Wainwright Prize for Picture Books	Amy-Jane Beer Illustrated by Elin Manon	Bothered By Bugs		
2026: The Children's Wainwright Prize for Picture Books	Nicola Davies Illustrated by Britta Teckentrup	Whale Song		
2026: The Children's Wainwright Prize for Picture Books	Alice Hemming Illustrated by Nicola Slater	The Sun Thief		
2026: The Children's Wainwright Prize for Picture Books	Robert Macfarlane Illustrated by Luke Adam Hawker	Firefly		
2026: The Children's Wainwright Prize for Picture Books	Jackie Morris and Cathy Fisher	The SUmmer Puppy		
2026: The Children's Wainwright Prize for Picture Books	Greg Stobbs	Isla and the Sky		
2026: The Children's Wainwright Prize for Picture Books	Yuval Zommer	The Whale that Sings in the Deep		
