= Climate Fiction Prize =

Literary award founded in 2024

The Climate Fiction Prize is a literary award for climate fiction, launched in June 2024 at the Hay Festival in Wales. Its aim is "to showcase novels that engage with themes concerning the climate crisis".

The prize, of £10,000, is supported by the not-for-profit organisation Climate Spring, whose mission statement describes it as "a global organisation with the aim to harness the storytelling power of film and TV to shift how society perceives and responds to the climate crisis".

The judges in the first year were writers Madeleine Bunting (chair of the judges) and Nicola Chester, whose On Gallows Down was shortlisted for 2022 Wainwright Prize; Andy Fryers, Global Sustainability Director of the Hay Festival; David Lindo, known as the Urban Birder; and author and climate activist Tori Tsui.

In the inaugural year of the award, titles were to be submitted from 3 June to 1 July 2024. The longlist was announced on 20 November 2024, the shortlist was announced in March 2025, and the winner was announced on 14 May 2025 as Abi Daré's And So I Roar.

== Winners and shortlisted and longlisted titles ==
Winners and long/shortlisted titles
Year	Author	Title	Publisher	Result	Ref.
2025	Kaliane Bradley	The Ministry of Time	Sceptre, Hodder	Shortlisted	
2025	Abi Daré	And So I Roar	Sceptre, Hodder	Won	
2025	Roz Dineen	Briefly Very Beautiful	Bloomsbury Circus	Shortlisted	
2025	Samantha Harvey	Orbital	Jonathan Cape, PRH	Shortlisted	
2025	Téa Obreht	The Morningside	W&N, Orion	Shortlisted	
2025	Julia Armfield	Private Rites	Harper Collins, 4th Estate	Longlisted	
2025	Chioma Okereke	Water Baby	Quercus	Longlisted	
2025	Natasha Pulley	The Mars House	Gollancz, Orion	Longlisted	
2025	Alexis Wright	Praiseworthy	And Other Stories	Longlisted	
