= Lee Schofield =

British conservationist and writer

- Born: Scotland
- Education: Imperial College London (MSc)
- Occupations: conservationist, writer
- Notable work: Wild Fell: Fighting for Nature on a Lake District Hill Farm
- Awards: Richard Jefferies Award
- Website: leeschofield.co.uk

Lee Schofield is a British naturalist and nature writer. He wrote Wild Fell: Fighting for Nature on a Lake District Hill Farm, which describes his work as site manager for the RSPB at Haweswater in the Lake District National Park.

== Early life and education ==
Schofield was born in Scotland but spent his childhood in Devon. He studied zoology at University, followed by an MSc in Ecological Management at Imperial College, London. For his MSc dissertation and for subsequent academic publications, he investigated social attitudes to large mammal reintroductions in the Scottish Highlands, a subject he would later return to in his writing.

== Work ==
Schofield began working as site manager for the RSPB at Haweswater shortly after the charity took over the tenancies of Naddle and Swindale Farms in 2012. The work he oversees is based on a partnership with United Utilities, who own the Haweswater Reservoir and the 10,000 hectares of catchment land around it. The part of the catchment that falls under the RSPB and United Utilities partnership is managed for the benefit of water, wildlife and people. Major programmes of woodland, bog, hay meadow and river restoration have been delivered and a sustainable grazing regime with native breed cattle and ponies and a small number of sheep has replaced the previous more intensive sheep-grazing model, resulting in increases in a wide range of species, including Atlantic salmon, tree pipit, red grouse, marsh fritillary butterfly, water vole and many specialist upland plants. Haweswater is increasingly recognised as one of the UK's most ambitious and pioneering nature recovery projects and has received multiple awards and accolades.

Schofield's first book, Wild Fell: Fighting for Nature on a Lake District Hill Farm, was published in February 2022. Reviewing it for The Guardian, Amy-Jane Beer described Schofield as "a delightfully companionable guide". It details his work at Haweswater, charting both the ecological changes that he has helped to bring about, as well as the personal challenges involved. Wild Fell won the Richard Jefferies Award in 2022, and was Highly Commended in the James Cropper Wainwright Prize for Writing on Conservation in the same year.

Schofield regularly gives talks and interviews about his work, and has contributed to several anthologies, co-authored academic papers, and written for magazines, including British Wildlife, Inkcap Journal, Cumbria Life and BBC Wildlife.

== Selected publications ==
=== Books ===
- Wild Fell: Fighting for Nature on a Lake District Hill Farm. Doubleday, 2022. ISBN 978-0857527752

=== Chapters ===
- Into the Red. Edited by Kit Jewitt and Mike Toms. British Trust for Ornithology, 2022. ISBN 9781912642380. Schofield contributes the chapter "Tree Pipit".
- North Country: An anthology of landscape and nature. Edited by Karen Lloyd. Saraband, 2022. ISBN 978-1913393403. Schofield contributes the chapter "The Northern Hay Meadow".
- The Wolf: Culture, Nature, Heritage. Edited by Ian Convery, Owen Nevin, Erwin van Maanen, Peter Davis and Karen Lloyd. Boydell and Brewer, 2023. ISBN 9781837650156. Schofield contributes the chapter "The Three-Legged Stool: Wolves, Shepherds and Sheep".
