= Angela Harding =

Printmaker and illustrator (born 1960)

- Born: June 1960 (age 66); Stoke-on-Trent, Staffordshire, England
- Education: Leicester Polytechnic
- Alma mater: Nottingham Polytechnic
- Occupations: Printmaker; Illustrator
- Website: angelaharding.co.uk

Angela Harding (born June 1960) is an English wildlife printmaker and illustrator. She has illustrated her own books and those of other authors, and has designed many book covers. She makes prints in media including etching and drypoint, and more recently also linocut.

== Early life and education ==
Angela Harding was born in June 1960, in Stoke-on-Trent, Staffordshire. the middle of three daughters to Stephen and Joan Harding. Her father was a headteacher and her mother taught pottery. All three sisters went to art college. She was educated at the Roman Catholic girls' school St Dominic's Grammar School in Stoke.

Harding studied Fine Art at Leicester Polytechnic, where she achieved a first class degree. She then took a master's degree in Fine Art at Nottingham Polytechnic.

== Career ==
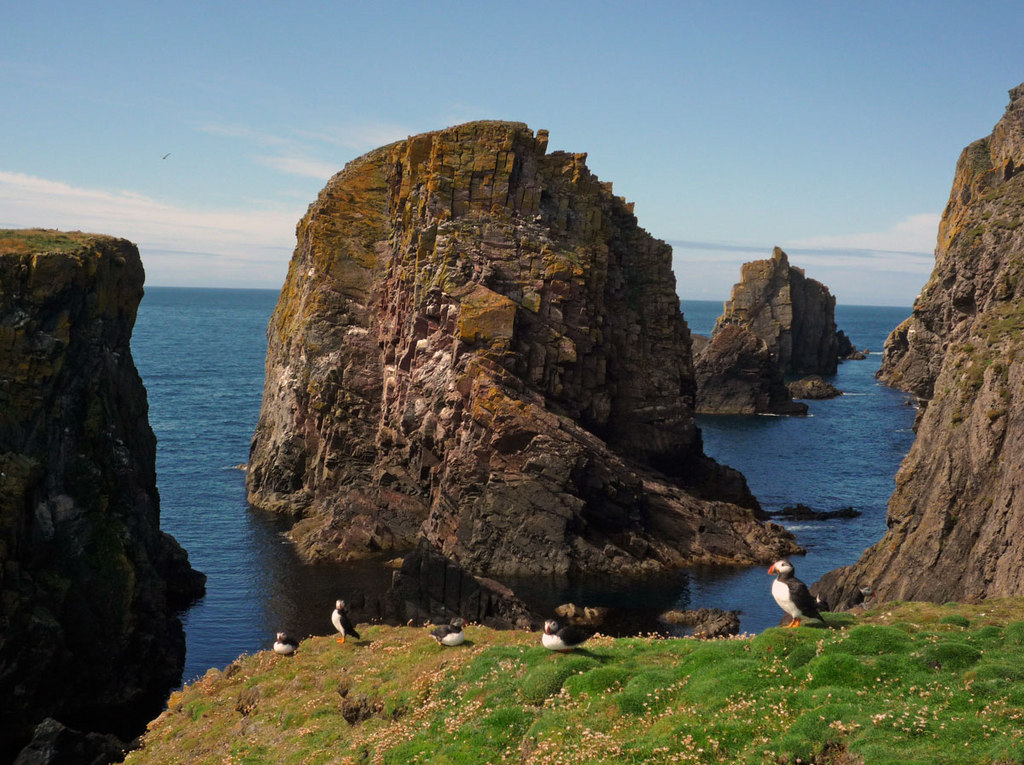
Harding makes sketches in the field, often by the sea such as in Fair Isle.

After leaving university, Harding rode a bicycle around Britain and travelled on a Magic Bus from London to Athens, a trip funded by the sale of work from her graduation show. She then spent 20 years working in the art world, including teaching and consultancy.

She works from her home as a wildlife printmaker and illustrator. She makes sketches in the field, developing these into print designs in her studio. Her work frequently combines drawings of places in Britain that she has visited with motifs of birds or animals. She states that she feels connected to the sea, whether sailing in East Anglia, walking the coast in Cornwall, or cycling in Shetland, especially Fair Isle.

Harding has made prints from 1982 onwards in a variety of media including etching and drypoint. More recently she has moved mainly to linocut or vinyl cut and silkscreen printing.

== Major works ==
Harding's books include the 2021 A Year Unfolding: A Printmaker’s View; the 2022 Wild Light; and the 2024 Still Waters & Wild Waves, for Little, Brown Book Group, which she worked on during a residency on Fair Isle.

In 2025, she published a series of four seasonal books, which include prints previously published elsewhere: Spring Unfurled, Summer's Hum, Falling Into Autumn and Winter's Song.

She has illustrated other authors' books, including a 2024 version of the conservationist Isabella Tree's Wilding and the poet laureate Simon Armitage's 2024 Blossomise.

Harding has made book cover illustrations for many books, including Raynor Winn's 2018 nature memoir The Salt Path and the shepherd James Rebanks' 2020 English Pastoral.

Her prints include Blossomise and Fair Isle Curlews and the South Lighthouse. Her work has appeared on bags, calendars, homeware, jigsaw puzzles, and notebooks.

== Awards and distinctions ==
Isabella Tree's Wilding: How to Bring Wildlife Back, The Illustrated Guide for Children, for Bloomsbury, illustrated by Harding, was the Children's Non-fiction Book of the Year in the 2025 British Book Awards.

Harding illustrated the 2022 Carnegie Medal for Writing-winning novel, October, October; one reviewer noted that "the black and white illustrations showing the different stages of development of the baby owl are stunning" and praised the cover design. This book was highly commended for the 2022 Wainwright Prize for Children's Writing on Nature and Conservation.

Two further titles illustrated by Harding have been shortlisted for the Wainwright Prize for Children's Writing on Nature and Conservation: Melissa Harrison's By Rowan and Yew for the 2022 award and Wilding for the 2024 award.

On 2 August 2025, she featured on BBC Radio 4's This Natural Life, interviewed on Fair Isle by Martha Kearney. On 5 October 2025, she was the castaway on BBC Radio 4's Desert Island Discs, hosted by Lauren Laverne. Her chosen book was Adam Nicolson's Bird School and her luxury item was a roll of lino prepared for printing and accessorised by glasses of champagne.

== Personal life ==
Harding has two children by her first husband. After their divorce she married her second husband, Mark. She lives in Wing, a village in Rutland.
