= Dara McAnulty =

Northern Irish naturalist (born 2004)

- Born: 31 March 2004 (age 22)
- Occupations: Naturalist, writer and environmental campaigner
- Writing career
- Notable awards: RSPB Medal; Wainwright Prize for UK nature writing

Dara Seamus McAnulty BEM (born 31 March 2004) is a naturalist, writer and environmental campaigner from Northern Ireland. He is the youngest ever winner of the RSPB Medal and received the Wainwright Prize for UK nature writing in 2020. He has written about his experience of autism and his love of the natural world.

== Personal life ==
McAnulty was born in 2004 and lives with his family near the Mourne Mountains, Northern Ireland. He attended Shimna Integrated College, completing school in 2022, and has since studied natural sciences at Queens' College, Cambridge.

In mid-2021, Monisha Rajesh reported in The Guardian that McAnulty had left Twitter after receiving abuse as a result of having raised concerns about Kate Clanchy's descriptions of autistic students and students of colour in her book Some Kids I Taught and What They Taught Me. As of April 2024 his profile on X, formerly Twitter, states that he has been a member since June 2016.

He is an ambassador for the RSPCA and the Jane Goodall Institute.

== Writings ==
His debut book Diary of a Young Naturalist which chronicles the turning of his fourteenth year, was released in May 2020. It details his intense connection to the natural world as an autistic teenager.

He has written for The Big Issue, The Guardian, has presented radio for BBC Radio Ulster and has appeared on Springwatch and Countryfile. He has also written and presented for BBC Radio 4's Tweet of the Day. He was a part of "The People's Walk for Wildlife" organised by television naturalist Chris Packham. He is a vocal campaigner on environmental issues.

In June 2021 McAnulty began writing a monthly nature column for The Irish Times.

== Awards and recognition ==
McAnulty was celebrated in "Points of Light" in 2018 by the UK Prime Minister for his work in connecting young people to nature. His campaigning work against raptor persecution and biodiversity loss earned him the RSPB Medal in 2019.

His first book, Diary of a Young Naturalist, won the 2020 Wainwright Prize for UK nature writing, after being the youngest author to be shortlisted for the award. He was also awarded the An Post Irish Book Award for Newcomer of the Year.

He is also the youngest author to be long-listed for the 2020 Baillie Gifford Prize for non-fiction and for the shortlist for the 2020 Books Are My Bag Readers' Awards, which he won in the non-fiction category.

In 2021, he was shortlisted for the Dalkey Literary Award (Emerging Writer) and won the British Book Award for narrative non-fiction.

His second book, Wild Child, was shortlisted for the 2022 Wainwright Prize for Children's Writing on Nature and Conservation.

McAnulty was awarded the British Empire Medal (BEM) in the 2023 New Year Honours for services to the environment and people with autism spectrum disorder.

== Bibliography ==
- Diary of a Young Naturalist. Little Toller Books. 2020. ISBN 978-1908213792.
- Wild Child : A Journey Through Nature. Macmillan. 2021. ISBN 978-1529045321.
