= Karen Lloyd =

Author and environmentalist

- Website: www.karenlloyd.co.uk

Karen Lloyd is an English author, poet, and environmental activist from the Lake District.

She is the author of The Gathering Tide (Saraband 2016) (selected as one of The Observer Writers’ Books of the Year in 2016), The Blackbird Diaries (Saraband 2017) and Abundance: Nature in Recovery (Bloomsbury 2021). Her writing has been published in The Guardian and various magazines and journals, including BBC Countryfile, The Ecologist and Goldsmiths scholarly communications. Her essays have been published on Dark Mountain ('Inside the Rockpool Shrimp there is a Dying Star') on Mark Avery's Blog and in the forthcoming edition of Bending Genre: Essays on Creative Nonfiction (Bloomsbury Academic). In spring 2020, after lockdown, she was commissioned by the BBC to write a poem in response to Ruskin's View in Kirkby Lonsdale, and appeared on BBC 3's arts programme The Verb, hosted by Ian McMillan.

Lloyd is a regular speaker at book festivals and on environment panels, and is currently Writer in Residence with Lancaster University's Future Places Centre.

== Books ==
=== The Gathering Tide ===
Her first book, The Gathering Tide: A Journey Around the Edgelands of Morecambe Bay (Saraband, 2016), is a memoir of a year spent walking the coast of this major tidal estuary, including social history, archaeology, wildlife and is also a pilgrimage through her past and present. It won the prize for Place Writing at the Lakeland Book of the Year 2016. Author and naturalist Mark Cocker called it "a hugely impressive debut"; while Miriam Darlington for BBC Wildlife wrote "Entrancing...sparkles with lyrical imagery-".

=== The Blackbird Diaries ===
In The Blackbird Diaries: A Year with Wildlife (Saraband, 2017), Lloyd documents wildlife in her garden in the Lakes and travels to the Shropshire Hills to the UK's leading curlew recovery project, Curlew Country, to document the diminishing numbers of lowland curlews. She also records her responses to the light of the Hebridean midsummer on the isle of Mull, a nighttime trip to the island of Staffa, and her encounters with sea eagles and otters. The book received the art and literature prize at the Lakeland Book of the Year Awards in 2018. The Great Outdoors wrote, "The writing is beautiful and insightful, with a clarity and attention to detail." while Caught by the River found it "captivating."

=== Abundance: Nature in Recovery ===
Lloyd's latest publication Abundance: Nature in Recovery (Bloomsbury, UK and US 2021), is a book of literary essays that express cautious hope for the regeneration of nature, including a Romanian project restoring Transylvanian forests, the return of the wolf to the Netherlands, and the return of the Imperial Eagle to the Hungarian Steppe. Lloyd also revisits her home territory in a discussion of climate change and land regeneration in the Lake District, where the restoration of soils slows rainfall and is driving the return of pollinators. Tim Smit, co-founder of the Eden Project said, "If I was to recommend one book people should read for their well-being it would be this." The Spectator described the book as dealing with ways that can help to "unlock many of our wider problems," and that the writing is "full of exuberant delight."

The book was longlisted for the 2022 James Cropper Wainwright Prize for International Conservation.
