= Wild Animals (disambiguation) =

Wild Animals or wildlife.

Wild Animals may also refer to:

- Wild Animals (film) is a 1996 Korean film by Kim Ki-duk.
- Wild Animals (The Pinker Tones album) (2008)
- Wild Animals (Juliana Hatfield album)
- Wild Animals (Trampled by Turtles album)
- "Wild Animals", a song by the Cat Empire from their 2013 album Steal the Light

== See also ==
- Wild Animal, an album by Vanity
- Wild Animals I Have Known
- Wild Beast (novel), a Chinese novel
- Wild Beasts, an English indie rock band
- Wildlife (disambiguation)
