= Anita Sethi =

British journalist and writer

Anita Sethi is a British writer, journalist and author who has written about nature, walking, racism, anxiety and northern England. She is a Fellow of the Royal Geographical Society and has been a Judge of the British Book Awards, the Women's Prize and the Orwell Prize. She is the winner of a Books Are My Bag Readers' Award and was nominated for the Wainwright Prize, The Great Outdoors Awards, and the Royal Society of Literature's Ondaatje Prize for writing that "evokes the spirit of a place". She has presented several episodes of BBC Radio 4's Tweet of the Day programme.

== Early life and education ==
Sethi was born in Manchester, England, to a mother from Guyana and a father from Kenya. Her mother was a nurse and a single parent; Sethi grew up in Old Trafford, Greater Manchester. She attended the University of Cambridge, where she read English. Sethi is a Doctor of Philosophy by publication.

== Career ==
Sethi has written for The Guardian, The Observer, The Sunday Times, The Independent, the New Statesman, Granta, The Times Literary Supplement and British Vogue among others. In broadcasting, she has been a critic, commentator and presenter on BBC programmes and has spoken at festivals. She has been on Ramblings on BBC Radio 4, when she and Clare Balding walked in Hope Valley, Derbyshire.

Sethi's essay "On Class and the Countryside" was published in the anthology The Wild Isles: An Anthology of the Best of British and Irish Nature Writing. Other anthologies she has been published in include Women on Nature, We Mark Your Memory: Writing from the Descendants of Indenture, and Way Makers: An Anthology of Women’s Writing About Walking (2023). She was a writer in residence at the Emerging Writers' Festival in Melbourne, Australia. She has been a judge of the Women's Prize for Fiction, the British Book Awards and the Costa Book Awards.

Sethi is the author of the memoir I Belong Here: A Journey Along the Backbone of Britain, published in 2021. In 2021, I Belong Here was shortlisted for the Wainwright Prize in the Nature Writing category and won a Books Are My Bag Readers' Award. It was nominated for the Royal Society of Literature's Ondaatje Prize 2022 for an outstanding work that "evokes the spirit of a place".

Sethi has written about racism in the United Kingdom and about being the victim of a race hate crime. She did the walk in the Pennines described in I Belong Here partly to "reclaim the landscapes of her beloved north country from the racist [abuser]", and has spoken about north-south prejudice. She has also written about using nature to help with anxiety, and about class and access to the countryside.

In 2018, at an event for the Commonwealth People's Forum, Sethi was introduced to Prince Charles. He told her that she didn't "look like" she was from Manchester. Sethi wrote about this for The Guardian as an example of "racism and ignorance". This was described in the media as a "racism row".

In 2026 she was elected a Fellow of the Royal Historical Society.
