= Dominic Couzens =

British birdwatcher and writer

- Occupation(s): Author and journalist
- Children: Sam Couzens, Emmie Couzens

Dominic Couzens is a leading nature writer, tour leader and lecturer based in the UK. He is the named author on more than 50 books, writes three regular magazine columns, and to date, has had more than 700 published articles.

He contributes regularly to Bird Watching and BBC Wildlife magazines; and is also a professional field trip guide. His books The Secret Lives of Garden Birds, The Secret Lives of British Birds, and The Secret Lives of Garden Wildlife all received praise, with the former selected by The Guardian as one of the best wildlife books of 2004, an accolade also received by the Secret Lives of British Birds, and the latter picked as one of the best new nature books of Spring 2008 by The Times.

In 2021, Couzens was awarded with the Dilys Breese Medal of the British Trust for Ornithology.

He is based in Dorset.

== Bibliography ==
=== Regular Magazine Columns ===
- Bird Watching Magazine (Bauer) – Regular and in every issue since 2000. Dominic's current column is called “Dominic Couzens on…” and features a different bird each month.
- Nature’s Home (RSPB) – Dominic has written in each issue since 2014. His current column is entitled, “Secret Lives".
- Water Life (Wildfowl and Wetlands Trust) – Current column entitled, “Spotter’s Guide”.

=== Other Magazines and Newspapers ===
- The Guardian Country Diary – (July 2021)
- Maxim (US) – (June 2020)
- BBC Wildlife
- BBC Countryfile Magazine

=== Books ===
- 2025: A Little Bird Told Me (Gaia, October, co-authored with Charlie Bingham)

•2025: A year of Tropical Birdsong (Batsford) June 2025

- 2024: RSPB Birding Year (Bloomsbury, October, co-authored with Sîan Duncan)
- 2024: An Insect a Day (Batsford, co-authored with Gail Ashton)
- 2024: ID Guide to Trees of Britain and North-west Europe" [co-authored with Gail Ashton] John Beaufoy Publishing. (March 2024)
- 2024: A Year of Garden Bees and Bugs (Batsford, March 2024, co-authored with Gail Ashton)
- 2024: Hidden Life of Garden Birds, Gaia (January 2024, a beefed-up reissue of Garden Bird Confidential 2011)
- 2023: Birdwatcher’s Garden Bird Puzzle Book, Gaia (October 2023)
- 2023: ID Guide to Garden Birds of Britain and North-west Europe [co-authored with Carl Bovis] John Beaufoy Publishing. (July 2023)
- 2022: Great British Birdwatcher’s Puzzle Book, Gaia (October 2022)
- 2022: A Year of Birdsong Pavilion (September 2022)
- 2022: ID Guide to Garden Insects of Britain and North-west Europe [co-authored with Gail Ashton] John Beaufoy Publishing. (June 2022)
- 2021: Save Our Species, Collins
- A Year of Birdsong – (2022), Pavilion
- ID Guide to Garden Insects of Britain and North-west Europe – (2022), [co-authored with Gail Ashton] (forthcoming) John Beaufoy Publishing
- Save Our Species – (2021), Collins
- The Collins Garden Birdwatcher's Bible, – (2021), [co-authored] Collins
- A Bird a Day, (2020), Pavilion
- 100 Birds to See in Your Lifetime, (2019), [co-authored], Carlton (2nd edition)
- Wild and Free, (2018), AA Publishing
- Britain's Mammals: A Field Guide to the Mammals of Britain and Ireland (WildGuides), (2017), [co-authored], Princeton
- Songs of Love and War (The Dark Heart of Bird Behaviour), (2016), Bloomsbury
- The British Wildlife Year, (2015), Hale
- Extreme Animals, (2015), New Holland
- Top 100 Birding Sites of the World, (2015), New Holland (USA edition)
- Tales of Remarkable Birds, (2015), Bloomsbury
- Birds: ID Insights, (2014), Bloomsbury
- The Secret Lives of Puffins, (2013), Bloomsbury
- The Crossley ID Guide, Britain and Ireland, (2013), [co-authored], Princeton
- A Patch Made in Heaven (A Year of Birdwatching in One Place), (2013), Hale
- Color Yourself Smart: Dinosaurs, (2012), Thunder Bay Press
- Garden Bird Confidential, (2011), Hamlyn, ISBN 978-0-600-62052-5
- Top Birding Sites of Europe, (2011), New Holland, ISBN 978-1-84773-767-0
- Color Yourself Smart: Birds of North America, (2011), Thunder Bay Press
- Atlas of Rare Birds, (2010), MIT Press, ISBN 978-0-262-01517-2
- My Family and 50 Other Animals, (2009), Andre Deutsch
- Top 100 Birding Sites of the World, (2008), New Holland, ISBN 978-1-84773-109-8
- Extreme Birds: From the fastest to the smartest, (2008), Collins, ISBN 978-0-00-727923-4
- Secret Lives of Garden Wildlife, (2008), A&C Black, ISBN 978-0-7136-8534-3
- The Complete Illustrated Encyclopaedia of British and European Birds, (2008), [co-authored], Flame Tree
- The Complete Illustrated Encyclopaedia of North American Birds, (2008), [co-authored with several], Metro
- Secret Lives of British Birds, (2006), Bloomsbury/RSPB, ISBN 0-7136-7513-6
- Collins Discover Birdwatching, (2006), [co-authored with Rob Hume], Smithsonian, ISBN 978-0-00-711112-1
- Collins Birds: A Complete Guide to all British and European Species, (2005), Collins
- Identifying Birds by Behaviour, (2005), Collins, ISBN 0-00-719922-8
- Bird Migration, (2005), New Holland, ISBN 1-84330-970-X
- The Complete Back Garden Birdwatcher, (2005), New Holland, ISBN 1-84330-959-9
- Secret Lives of Garden Birds, (2004), Bloomsbury/RSPB, ISBN 978-0-7136-9286-0
- Unusual Birds, World of Animals 20, (2003), Grolier
- The Birdwatcher's Logbook, (2003), New Holland
- Tropical Forest Birds, World of Animals 19, (2003), Grolier
- Seed, Fruit and Nectar-eating Birds, World of Animals 16, (2003), Grolier
- Animal, (2003), [co-authored], Dorling Kindersley
- Wings Guide to British Birds, (1997), Collins, ISBN 978-0-00-220069-1
- The Mitchell Beazley Pocket Guide to Garden Birds, (1996), [co-authored with Mike Langman] Mitchell Beazley, ISBN 978-1-85732-495-2
