= John Grindrod =

John Grindrod may refer to:

- John Grindrod (bishop)
- John Grindrod (author)
