= Wildlife (disambiguation) =

Wildlife includes all non-domesticated plants, animals, and other organisms.

Wildlife or Wild Life may also refer to:

== Film and television ==
- Boonie Bears: The Wild Life, a 2021 Chinese animated film
- Robinson Crusoe (2016 film), a Belgian-French animated film released in North America as The Wild Life
- The Wild Life (film), a 1984 American film
- Wildlife (film), a 2018 American drama film by Paul Dano based on the 1990 novel Wildlife
- Wild Life (1918 film), a silent American film directed by Henry Otto
- Wild Life (2011 film), an animated short Wendy Tilby and Amanda Forbis
- Wild Life (2014 film), a French-Belgian drama film
- The Wild Life, the North American name of the 2016 film Robinson Crusoe
- Wild Life (2023 film), a documentary film by Elizabeth Chai Vasarhelyi and Jimmy Chin
- Wild Life (concert), a 2010 concert tour by Hikaru Utada
- Wild Life (TV series), a 2020 adult animated comedy series on Syfy's late-night programming block, TZGZ.
- "Wildlife" (Law & Order: Special Victims Unit), a 10th-season episode of Law & Order: Special Victims Unit

== Magazines ==
- BBC Wildlife (previously just Wildlife)
- Wild Life (magazine), Australian natural history magazine published 1938–1954

== Music ==
- Wildlife (band), Toronto indie rock band
- Wild Life (Wings album), 1971, or the title song
- Wild Life (Pupil album)
- Wildlife (Mott the Hoople album), 1971
- [[Wildlife (Anthony Phillips and Joji Hirota album)|Wildlife (Anthony Phillips and Joji Hirota album)]]
- Wildlife (Girlschool EP), 1982
- The Wild Life (album), a 1992 album by the American band Slaughter
- Wildlife, a 2001 album by The Crash (band)
- Wildlife (Headlights album), 2009
- Wildlife (Joe Morris album), 2009
- Wildlife (La Dispute album), 2011
- Wild Life (Hedley album), 2013
- Wildlif3, a 2014 album by Def3
- "The Wild Life" (song), by Bananarama
- "Wild Life" (Jack & Jack song), 2014
- "Wild Life" (OneRepublic song), 2020
- "Wild Life", a song by Captain Beefheart from Trout Mask Replica
- "The Wild Life", a song by Vacationer on their album Relief
- D.I.T.C. Presents Wild Life, a 2001 EP by Diggin' in the Crates Crew

== Other ==
- Wild Life (comic anthology), a furry anthology comic book published by Antarctic Press
- Wild Life (manga), a 2003 manga, created by Masato Fujisaki, about a delinquent who is working as a veterinarian
- Wildlife (novel), a novel by Richard Ford and the basis for the 2018 film of the same name
- The Wild Life: A Year of Living on Wild Food, 2009 book by John Lewis-Stempel

== See also ==
- "Wild Wild Life", 1986 song by Talking Heads
