= Joe Harkness =

British mental health activist, naturalist and writer (1986–2026)

- Born: 23 December 1986; King's Lynn, Norfolk, England
- Died: 4 September 2026 (aged 39)
- Occupations: Mental health activist, naturalist, writer
- Children: 2

Joe Harkness (23 December 1986 – 4 September 2026) was a British mental health activist, naturalist and writer.

== Biography ==
Harkness was born in King's Lynn, Norfolk on 23 December 1986. His mother was an administrator. In 2013, he attempted suicide, suffering from poor mental health and alcohol abuse. After his suicide attempt, he described birdwatching as one of the "best therapies", and he gained popularity on X for his online blog on bird therapy.

In 2018, Harkness wrote the self-published book Bird Therapy, which received widespread acclaim for its personal, inspiring and hopeful message around the benefits of birdwatching and nature therapy on mental health. The book was endorsed by prominent naturalist Chris Packham, who wrote the foreword, and was eventually translated into five languages. In 2023, he wrote the book Inside/Outside, and in 2025, he wrote the book Neurodivergent, By Nature, published by Bloomsbury Publishing. His book was shortlisted for the Wainwright Prize in the category Conservation Writing. In 2026, Harkness had finished a second edition of Bird Therapy which is set to be published by Bloomsbury in 2027.

Alongside his writing, Harkness worked as a teacher at a number of schools, including in Cromer and Norwich, providing education and pastoral care to children with special educational needs and other disabilities.

He died on 4 September 2026, at the age of 39. He was found in woodland on Cawston Heath, Norfolk. An inquest has opened into his death at Norfolk Coroner's Court. It found that he had died by hanging. A full inquest will occur on 8 December 2026.

Harkness was married, and had two daughters.
