= Tori Tsui =

Hongkonger intersectional climate activist and mental health advocate

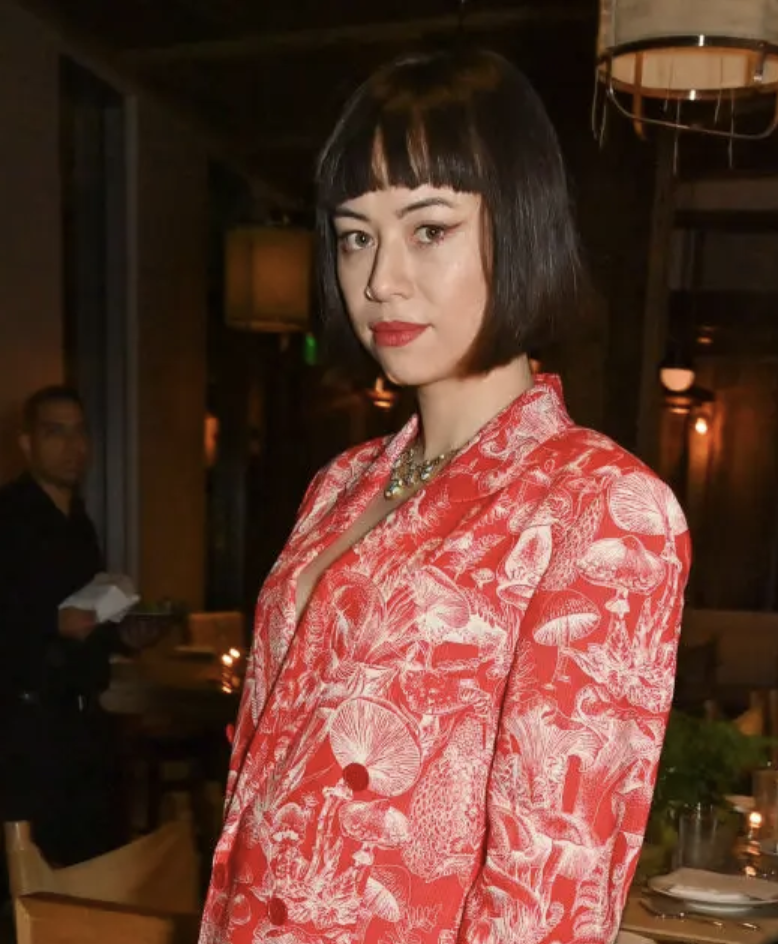
- Born: October 25, 1994 (age 32)
- Occupations: Climate activist; writer
- Website: Official website

Tori Tsui (born October 25, 1994) is a Hong Kong climate justice activist, author, model and spokesperson who resides in England.

== Early life and education ==
Tsui was born in Auckland, New Zealand and grew up in Hong Kong. She initially pursued medicine at the University of Oxford before switching to Natural Sciences. She then graduated in 2015 with a Master of Research in Ecology, Evolution and Conservation at Imperial College London with the intention of completing a PhD. Tsui deferred her PhD before withdrawing altogether and moved to Bristol to work in the natural history documentary industry. During this time, Tsui was scouted to be a presenter but formally left wildlife filmmaking after working on BBC Springwatch.

== Activism ==
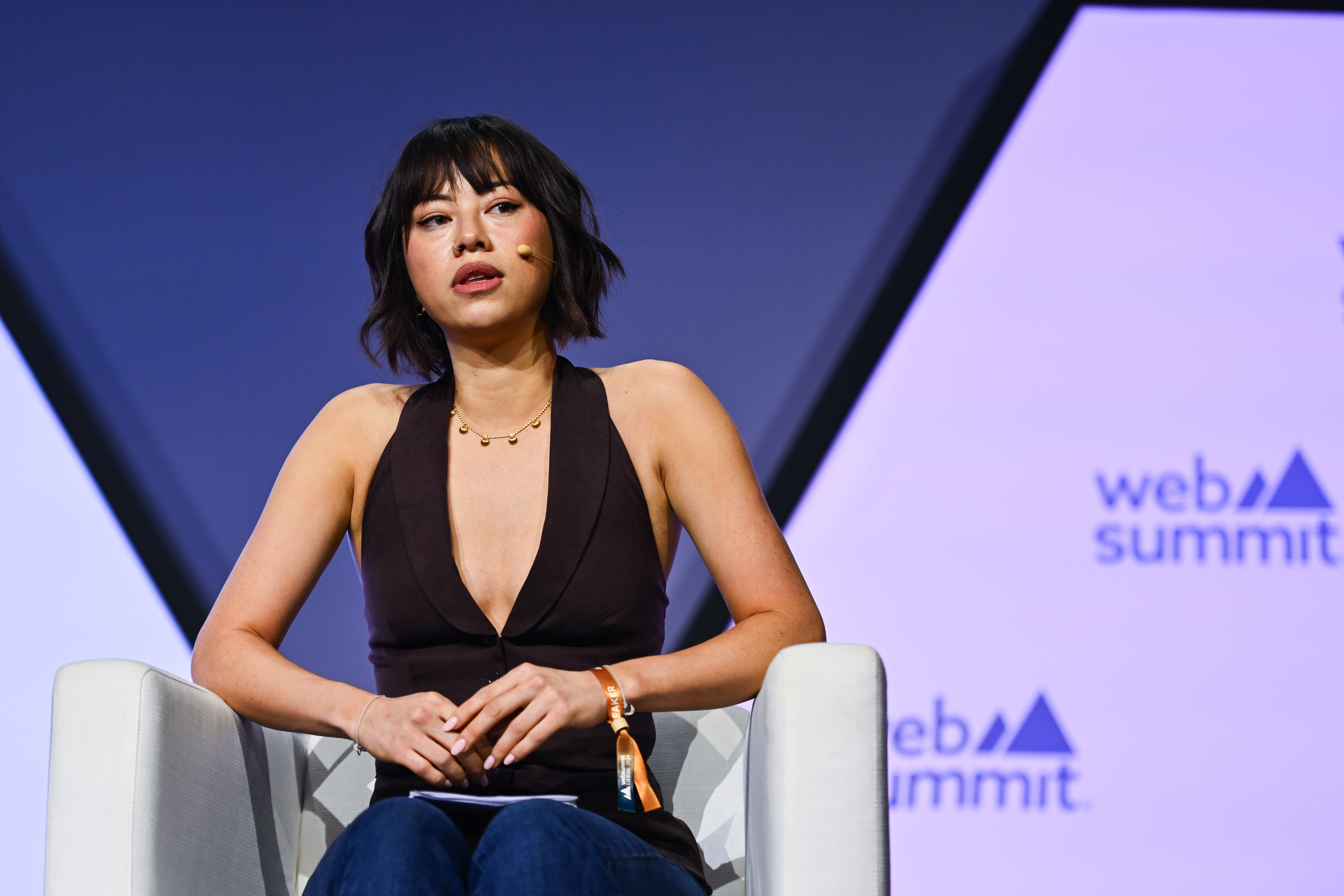
Tsui at the 2024 New Energy Summit

Tsui was involved in Extinction Rebellion. She created films on the biodiversity crisis and was scouted at a protest by the creative director of Stella McCartney who invited Tsui to model McCartney's global fall/winter campaign. The campaign, entitled ‘Agents of Change’, featured Jane Goodall, Amber Valletta and Jonathan Safran Foer.

McCartney subsequently sponsored Tsui to sail across the Atlantic to COP25 as part of Sail To The COP - a think tank initiative involving 36 youths to attend the 2019 United Nations Climate Change Conference in Santiago, Chile. Due to civil unrest in Chile, the event was relocated to Madrid. While in Martinique, the delegates worked remotely on COP25. The ship finally docked in Cartagena.

While in Colombia, Tsui spent four months facilitating a new project called Sail for Climate Action. The project's purpose was to bring Latin American, Indigenous and Caribbean youth activists to attend the United Nations Climate Change Intersessional SB52 in Bonn, Germany. Later, Sail for Climate Action was rebranded to Unite for Climate Action. The project collaborated with the German Ministry in 2020.

In 2021, Tsui launched the Pass the Mic initiative with Dominique Palmer, Frances Fox, George Steedman Jones and Elijah Mckenzie-Jackson as a way to shed light on the climate crisis. The campaign was focused on targeting brands, figures and organisation to spotlight frontline climate activists and people affected by the climate change. Tsui has also spoken out on the #StopCambo Campaign against North Sea oil and gas in decision making spaces, leading a protest against Ben Van Beurden at TED Countdown in Edinburgh. Later that year she attended the 2021 United Nations Climate Change Conference. Emma Watson invited Tsui to participate in a New York Times climate hub event alongside Amanda Gorman, Malala Yousafzai, Greta Thunberg, Vanessa Nakate, Dominique Palmer, Mya-Rose Craig, Viviam Villafana and Daphne Frias.

In January 2023, Tsui, a long-term collaborator of Billie Eilish, was invited to be on the digital front cover of Vogue with Billie Eilish, Quannah Chasinghorse, Xiye Bastida, Isaias Hernandez, Ryan Berberet, Nalleli Cobo, Wawa Gatheru and Maya Penn. Tsui works in Stop Rosebank campaign as partnership consultant. In January 2025, the campaign group successfully won their court case against Ithaca Energy and Equinor. Tsui works as climate justice leadwith Brian Eno's organisation EarthPercent.

== Publications ==
Tsui released her debut book, It's Not Just You in 2023. The book was shortlisted for the 2024 Wainwright Prize for Writing on Conservation and became one of Best Book of 2023 for popular science in Waterstones.
