= Nicola Chester =

British nature writer

Nicola Chester is a British nature writer. She is a regular columnist in The Guardian and in the RSPB's magazine, and has written a memoir On Gallows Down.

== Life and education ==
Chester is from a working-class family: her father was a firefighter and her mother an assistant in local government. She applied to an agricultural college to study game and wildlife conservation management, but was told that the course was for gamekeepers and all gamekeepers were men. She spent a year working on a horse ranch in Canada, and then returned to England and studied English literature at King Alfred's College, now the University of Winchester, supporting herself with part-time jobs. She is a former school librarian. She and her family are tenants in an estate worker's cottage in the North Wessex Downs.

== Writing career ==
Chester won the BBC Wildlife Magazine's award for nature writing in 2003, and was then offered a column in the RSPB's magazine Nature's Home. She has been one of the writers of The Guardian's "Country Diary" since 2019. She also writes for BBC Countryfile Magazine.

Her Otters (2014, Bloomsbury: ISBN 978-1472903860) was the first book in the RSPB's Spotlight series.

Her memoir On Gallows Down: Place, Protest and Belonging (2021, Chelsea Green: ISBN 978-1645021162) won the 2021 Richard Jefferies Award, was shortlisted for the 2022 Wainwright Prize for Nature Writing, and was included in BBC Countryfile Magazine's "best nature and countryside books of 2021". It takes its name from Gallows Down, on which Combe Gibbet stands, above her home village of Inkpen in West Berkshire. A reviewer in The Sociological Review describes it as "an autobiographical account of how a white working-class woman has, at times, struggled to maintain a sense of belonging and acceptance in rural England" and says that as well as being part of the genre of "new nature writing" it is also "about gender and social class in the English countryside".

In 2024 she was appointed as one of the judges of the inaugural Climate Fiction Prize.

Ghosts of the Farm: Two Women’s Journeys Through Time, Land and Community, by Chester, was published by Chelsea Green in September 2025. The book was shortlisted for the Richard Jefferies Award for Nature Writing, 2026, and was a Spectator Book of the Year.
