= The Girl with the Louding Voice =

2020 novel by Abi Daré

- First edition (UK)
- Author: Abi Daré
- Audio read by: Adjoa Andoh
- Language: English
- Genre: Fiction
- Publisher: Sceptre (UK); E. P. Dutton (US)
- Publication date: 2020
- Publication place: Nigeria
- Followed by: And So I Roar

The Girl with the Louding Voice is a 2020 coming of age novel and the debut novel of Nigerian writer Abi Daré. It tells the story of a teenage Nigerian girl called Adunni who becomes a maid and faces many obstacles growing up, including her limited education, poverty and her inability to speak up for herself. The book was published by Sceptre, an imprint of Hodder.

== Writing process ==
The Girl with the Louding Voice was written over a period of three years. Daré has said that she first had the idea for the novel when she read a news article about a thirteen-year-old housemaid who was scalded when her employer poured boiling water on her. It was also partly inspired by her daughters and her years living in rural Nigeria. Daré used non-standard English, and some borrowed words from Pidgin English, in the novel, stating that she did so because she believes that standard English is not a measure of intelligence.

== Plot ==
Adunni is a 14-year-old girl from a poor home who lives in a rural village near the city of Lagos. She is fiercely intelligent, outspoken and opinionated, but lives in a culture that does not value these attributes in women. Her desire to get an education so she can eventually fulfil her lifelong ambition of becoming a teacher herself is curtailed by poverty.

After the death of her mother, the main breadwinner, Adunni's father forces her to become the third wife of an elderly man in order to use her bride price for the family's upkeep. Her husband rapes her repeatedly. Later, she escapes to Lagos to become the housemaid of a woman called Big Madam who exploits and physically abuses her. Despite the various traumas she endures, Adunni holds on to her dream of going to school, having decided that education is the only way to free herself from oppression.

== Themes ==
The main themes of The Girl with the Louding Voice are female empowerment, the ability to speak up and the importance of following one's dreams, as showcased by the main character Adunni. The novel has also been noted for its realistic depiction of sexism, poverty in Nigeria, child labour and child marriage in Nigeria — all obstacles which Adunni must overcome to pursue her goal of getting an education.

== Reception ==
The book received several positive reviews. It was a New York Times Bestseller, a February 2020 'Read with Jenna' choice and a BBC Radio 4 Book at Bedtime pick.

The book was shortlisted for the Desmond Elliott Prize for first time novelists. It was recommended by several media outlets including The New York Times, Vogue and Essence. A starred review by Kirkus Reviews called it "heartbreaking and inspiring."
