= The Wood: The Life and Times of Cockshutt Wood =

2018 book

- Author: John Lewis-Stempel
- Language: English
- Subject: Nature, English Woodlands
- Publisher: Doubleday
- Publication date: 8 March 2018
- Publication place: United Kingdom
- Media type: Print
- Pages: 304

The Wood: The Life and Times of Cockshutt Wood is a non-fiction book by British author John Lewis-Stempel published in 2018. Written in a diary format, it chronicles Lewis-Stempel's experiences managing Cockshutt Wood, a mixed woodland in Herefordshire. The book, which covers the final year of his stewardship, reflects on the importance of such woodlands in the British countryside and their rich biodiversity.

== Background ==
John Lewis-Stempel managed Cockshutt Wood for four years, during which he practiced agroforestry, maintaining the wood as a vibrant, living ecosystem. His approach to woodland management involved raising free-roaming livestock, such as pigs and Hebridean sheep, to control undergrowth and encourage the growth of wildflowers, thereby enhancing the wood's biodiversity.

== Summary ==
The Wood provides an intimate portrayal of Cockshutt Wood through the changing seasons. It captures the minutiae of woodland life, from the flora and fauna to the practices of traditional woodland management. The book is steeped in the poetry, folklore, and natural history of English woods, offering insights into Lewis-Stempel's deep connection with the land and the creatures that inhabit it.

== Reception ==
The book received praise for its evocative portrayal of the English countryside and its lyrical, informative style. It was celebrated for its deep dive into the lore and language of woodlands and Lewis-Stempel's keen observations of the natural world. The Guardian highlighted the book's ability to transport readers into the heart of the woodland, praising its poetic intensity and concision. The Times review spoke highly of the book, noting its engaging narrative and detailed observation. The London Review Bookshop lauded The Wood for its lyrical and informative nature.
