= Melissa Harrison =

English novelist, short story and nature writer

Melissa Harrison FRSL
- Born: 1975 (age 50–51); Effingham Junction, Surrey, England
- Education: Lincoln College, Oxford
- Occupations: Novelist, short story writer, nature writer
- Writing career
- Notable works: Clay; At Hawthorn Time; All Among the Barley; By Ash, Oak and Thorn
- Notable awards: Fellow of the Royal Society of Literature (2026)

Melissa Harrison (born 1975) is an English novelist, short story and nature writer.

She was elected a Fellow of the Royal Society of Literature (FRSL) in 2026.

== Early ==
Harrison was born in Effingham Junction, Surrey in 1975. She attended a comprehensive school before studying English Literature at Lincoln College at the University of Oxford, graduating in 1996. After graduating, she worked as a freelance magazine subeditor, while contributing a regular "Nature Notes" column in The Times, columns for The Guardian and contributions to radio and television.

== Literary career ==
Her first novel, Clay, was published by Bloomsbury in January 2013, followed by At Hawthorn Time in 2015. Her non-fiction books include Rain: Four Walks in English Weather (2016). A third novel, All Among the Barley, was published in August 2018. Her short story "The Black Dog" was broadcast on BBC Radio 4 in March 2017 and she has contributed episodes to the channel's Tweet of the Day programme. She has appeared on the BBC Two series Springwatch. During the 2020 COVID-19 lockdown, she began a nature diary podcast called The Stubborn Light of Things which formed the basis of a new memoir published in November 2020 that outlined her move from urban London to rural Suffolk. Her first children's novel, By Ash, Oak and Thorn was published by Chicken House Books in May 2021.

Harrison was elected a Fellow of the Royal Society of Literature (FRSL) in 2026.

== Awards ==
Year	Title	Award	Category	Result	Ref
2015	At Hawthorn Time	Costa Book Awards	Novel	Shortlisted	
2016	At Hawthorn Time	Bailey Women's Prize for Fiction	—	Longlisted	
2016	Rain	Wainwright Prize	—	Longlisted	
2019	All Among the Barley	European Union Prize for Literature	—	Won	
2021	By Ash, Oak and Thorn	Books Are My Bag Readers' Awards	Children's	Shortlisted	
2021	The Stubborn Light of Things	East Anglian Book Awards	Book of the Year	Won	
2021	The Stubborn Light of Things	Independent Booksellers' Book Prize	—	Shortlisted	
2022	By Rowan and Yew	Wainwright Prize	—	Shortlisted	
2025	Homecoming: A Guided Journal to Lead You Back to Nature	Wainwright Prize	Illustrative Books	Shortlisted	

== Bibliography ==
=== Novels ===
- Clay (2013)
- At Hawthorn Time (2015
- All Among the Barley (2018)
- The Given World (2026)

=== Children's ===
- By Ash, Oak and Thorn (2021)
- By Rowan and Yew (2022)

=== Nature writing ===
- Rain: Four Walks in English Weather (2016)
- The Stubborn Light of Things: A Nature Diary (2020)
- Homecoming: A Guided Journal to Lead You Back to Nature (2025)
