= John Lewis-Stempel =

English author (born 1967)

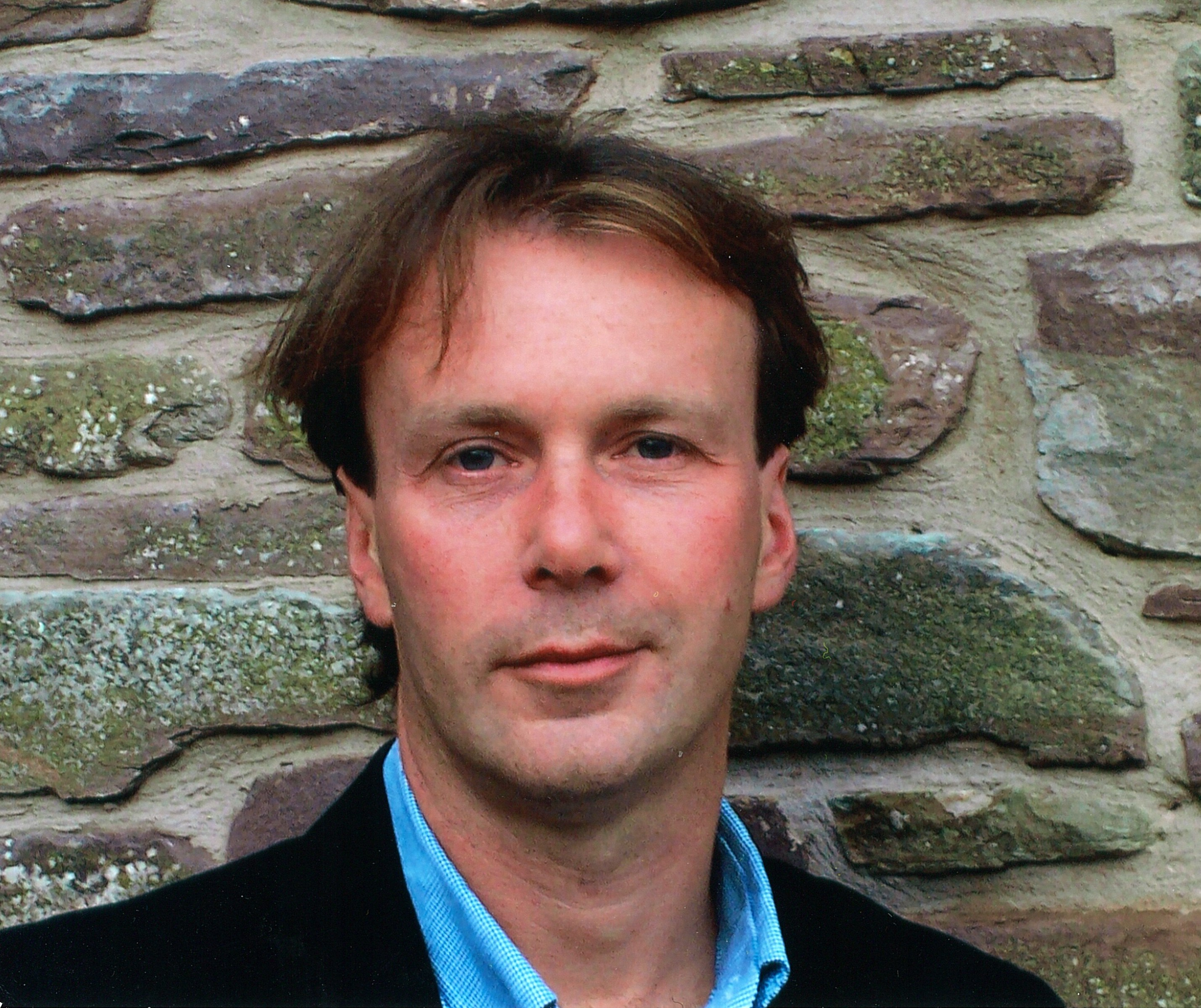
- Born: 1967 (56-57); Hereford
- Occupations: Writer; Farmer
- Known for: Military and natural histories
- Spouse: Penelope Lewis-Stempel
- Children: 2

John Lewis-Stempel is an English farmer, writer, and Sunday Times Top 5 best selling author. The Times, The Mail, The Telegraph have described him as 'Britain's finest living nature writer'

== Early life ==
Lewis-Stempel was born in Herefordshire in 1967, where his family have lived for over 700 years. He read for an MA in History at Bristol.

== Career ==
He has written on a range of subjects from Native Americans to fatherhood, but specialises in military history and natural history under his family name.

He worked for Time Out during the late 1980s, and wrote across the New Statesman, The Independent and The Guardian under a pen name during the 1990s.

Lewis-Stempel is a former columnist for The Sunday Express, and currently a columnist for Country Life and The Times. His Times column, Nature Notebook, focuses on both nature and farming across the UK.

His column on nature and farming in Country Life won him Magazine Columnist of the Year in the 2016 BSME Awards. His monthly column in The Countryman magazine began in March 2023.

Lewis-Stempel's book Meadowland: The Private Life of an English Field won the Wainwright Prize and was also short-listed for BBC Countryfile's Country Book of the Year 2014. In 2016 The Running Hare was a BBC Radio 4 Book of the Week and a Sunday Times best seller, and was shortlisted for the 2017 Wainwright Prize, The Richard Jefferies Society Prize and the Independent Bookshop Week Book Award.

He won the 2017 Wainwright Prize with another shortlisted book, Where Poppies Blow, about British soldiers and their relationship with nature in World War I. The Spectator has described him as 'the hottest nature writer around', and The Times as 'Britain's finest living nature writer'. The Telegraph The Wood: The Life and Times of Cockshutt Wood, released in 2018, was also a Radio 4 Book of the Week, and Sunday Times top five bestseller. His history of farming in England, Woodston, published in 2021, also became a Sunday Times bestseller.

La Vie, (2023) describes his experience in 'la France profonde'. Labelled a 'poetic, sound-filled book', it saw Lewis-Stempel dubbed 'our finest nature and farming writer' by the Times Literary Supplement. The book was a Waterstones Best Book of 2024. In the same year he published England, A Natural History, another Sunday Times bestseller and selected by The Independent as one of the best 20 books of the year

== Personal life ==
Lewis-Stempel currently lives between South West France and the UK. He has two children, Tristram and Freda, with his wife, Penelope.

== Awards ==
- Society of Authors Foundation Award (2012)
- Thwaites Wainwright Prize (2015)
- BSME Awards Magazine Columnist of the Year (SI/B) (2016)
- Gambrinus 'Giuseppe Mazozotti' Literary Prize (2016, commended)
- Thwaites Wainwright Prize (2017)

== Bibliography ==
- Fatherhood: An Anthology (2001)
- England: The Autobiography (2005)
- The Autobiography of the British Soldier: From Agincourt to Basra, in His Own Words (2007)
- The Wild Life: A Year of Living on Wild Food (2009)
- Young Herriot: The Early Life and Times of James Herriot (2011)
- Six Weeks: The Short and Gallant Life of the British Officer in the First World War: The Life and Death of the British Officer in the First World War (2011)
- Young James Herriot: The Making of the World's Most Famous Vet (2012)
- Foraging, The essential guide to wild food (2012)
- The War Behind the Wire: The Life, Death and Glory of British Prisoners of War, 1914–18 (2014)
- Meadowland: The Private Life of an English Field (2014)
- A Brief History of the British Army (with Jock Haswell) (2016)
- The Running Hare: The Secret Life of Farmland (2016)
- Where Poppies Blow (2016)
- The Secret Life of the Owl (2017)
- The Wood: The Life and Times of Cockshutt Wood (2018)
- The Glorious Life of the Oak (2018)
- Still Water: The Deep Life of the Pond (2019)
- Woodston (2021)
- The Soaring Life of the Lark (2021)
- The Sheep's Tale (2022)
- Nightwalking (2022)
- La Vie (A year in rural France) (2023)
- England, A natural History (2024)
- The Curious Life of the Cuckoo (2025)
- Night Life: Walking Britain’s wild landscapes after dark (2025)
