= Abi Daré =

Nigerian author

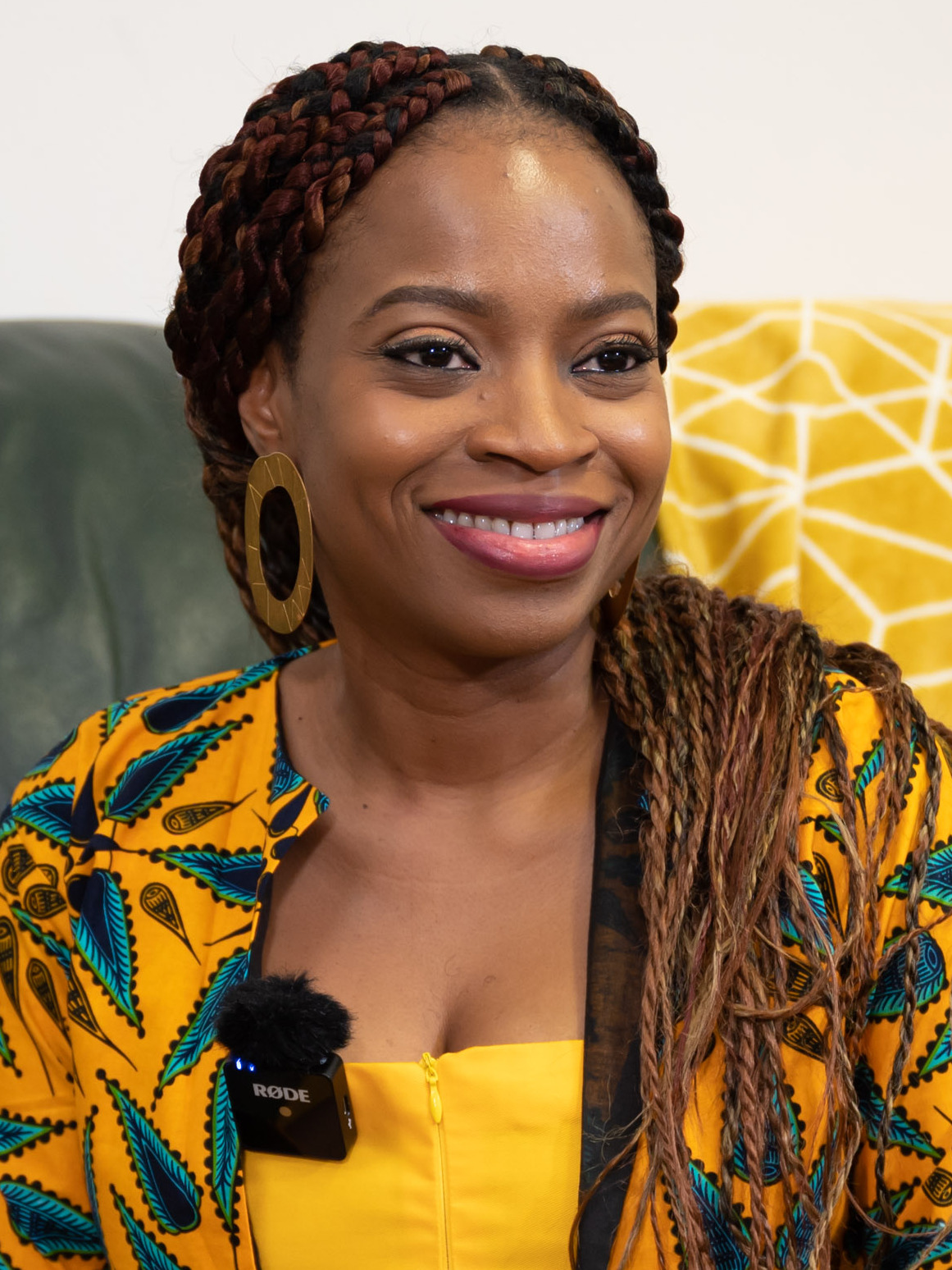
- Daré in 2022
- Born: Abimbola Daré; Lagos, Nigeria
- Education: University of Wolverhampton; Glasgow Caledonian University; Birkbeck, University of London
- Occupations: Author and public speaker
- Writing career
- Years active: 2018–present
- Genres: Fiction, young adult
- Notable work: The Girl with the Louding Voice (2020)

Abimbola "Abi" Daré is a Nigerian author and public speaker who now lives in Essex, England. In 2018, she won the Bath Novel Award, and was a finalist in the Literary Consultancy Pen Factor 2018. Her debut novel The Girl with the Louding Voice was published in 2020 to critical acclaim.

== Biography ==
Daré grew up in Lagos, Nigeria, attending the Vivian Fowler Memorial College for Girls, and moved to the UK for her higher education. Her mother Teju Somorin was the first female professor of taxation in Nigeria.

Daré has a degree in law from the University of Wolverhampton, a Master's in International project management, graduating as best performing student from Glasgow Caledonian University and a Master's with distinction in creative writing from Birkbeck, University of London.

== Career ==
She has said she began writing fiction on a blog and was the editor of her church magazine. Daré works overseeing app development for a publishing firm.

In 2022, Daré was appointed as External Board Member at the BiC Corporate Foundation.

In March 2023, Daré delivered the keynote address at The Social Enterprise Conference at Harvard Kennedy School and Harvard Business School.

=== The Girl with the Louding Voice ===
Daré's debut novel The Girl with the Louding Voice is a story about a teenage Nigerian girl called Adunni, who becomes a maid and struggles with many things growing up, including her limited education, poverty and her ability to speak up for herself.

The book became a New York Times Bestseller and is a Read with Jenna choice and a BBC Radio 4 Book at Bedtime pick. Published by Sceptre, an imprint of Hodder, it was shortlisted for the Desmond Elliott Prize for first time novelists. Daré was included in The Observer's list of 10 Best Debut Novelists of 2020.

The novel has been translated into more than 19 languages.

=== And So I Roar ===
Daré's second novel, And So I Roar, was published in 2024 and won the 2025 Climate Fiction Prize.

== Awards ==
Year	Title	Award	Category	Result	Ref.
2020	The Girl with the Louding Voice	Desmond Elliott Prize	—	Shortlisted	
2020	The Girl with the Louding Voice	Goodreads Choice Awards	Fiction	Nominated	
2020	The Girl with the Louding Voice	Not the Booker Prize	—	Shortlisted	
2021	The Girl with the Louding Voice	British Book Awards	Début Book of the Year	Shortlisted	
2021	The Girl with the Louding Voice	RUSA CODES Listen List	—	Selection	
2025	And So I Roar	Climate Fiction Prize	Fiction	Won	

== Novels ==
- The Girl with the Louding Voice (2020)
- And So I Roar (2024)
