= Mike Parker (writer) =

British travel writer (born 1967)

- Born: December 1966 (age 59); Birmingham, England
- Education: Westfield College
- Occupation: Writer

Mike Parker (born December 1966) is a British travel writer, living near Machynlleth in mid Wales. He grew up in Kidderminster, Worcestershire and graduated in 1989 in English and Drama from Westfield College, University of London.

He was the co-author of the Rough Guide to Wales, and has also written books on four British cities, and on the gay scenes of Scotland, Ireland and Northern England. In addition, Parker has worked as a stand-up comedian.

After moving to Wales in spring 2000, he became involved in television, writing and presenting a one-off Saint David's Day special for HTV Wales in 2002. This led to him being commissioned to write and present two series of Coast to Coast, where Parker took twelve journeys in different boats around the Welsh coast. He made four series of Great Welsh Roads for HTV Wales, which saw Parker and his dog tour the country in a camper van.

Since 2007, he has concentrated on writing narrative non-fiction books that start from a profound sense of place. Author and Broadcaster Horatio Clare said of him, "A kind of mini-biography of the British psyche emerges from Parker's work, its learning lightly worn and its tales well told, full of interest and incident." His 2009 book Map Addict became a bestseller; reviewed in The Daily Telegraph as "this excellent book on the pleasures of maps and navigation, which is also a withering attack on the infantilisation of the satnav age."

His 2019 book On the Red Hill won the non-fiction Wales Book of the Year for 2020, and was Highly Commended ("An extraordinary memoir that stood out amongst our strongest shortlist to date") for the 2020 Wainwright Prize for UK nature writing.

== Bibliography ==
- Coast to Coast, Gwasg Carreg Gwalch, March 2004. ISBN 978-0863818981
- Neighbours from Hell? English Attitudes to the Welsh, Y Lolfa, February 2007. ISBN 978-0862436117
- Map Addict: A Tale of Obsession, Fudge & the Ordnance Survey, Collins, April 2009. ISBN 978-0007351572
- The Wild Rover, Collins, March 2010. ISBN 978-0007372669
- Real Powys, Real Wales series, Seren, November 2011. ISBN 978-1854115539
- Mapping the Roads, Automobile Association, October 2013. ISBN 978-0749574352
- The Greasy Poll, Y Lolfa, September 2016. ISBN 978-1784612696
- On the Red Hill: Where Four Lives Fell Into Place, William Heinemann, June 2019. ISBN 978-1785151934
- All the Wide Border: Wales, England and the Places Between, 2023 ISBN 978-0-00-849918-11

== Political career ==
In June 2013, Parker was chosen by Plaid Cymru to be its candidate for the UK parliamentary constituency of Ceredigion, one of the party's target seats. In the 2015 United Kingdom general election he came second to the incumbent Liberal Democrat MP Mark Williams. Parker published a diary of the notorious campaign in his book, The Greasy Poll.
