= Cal Flyn =

Scottish nonfiction author

Cal Flyn is a Scottish author and journalist.

== Early life ==
Flyn was born in Inverness, Scotland. She attended Charleston Academy, a state secondary school. As a child, she underwent orthopedic surgery to correct proximal femoral focal deficiency affecting the left leg.

Flyn holds an MA in experimental psychology from Lady Margaret Hall, Oxford, and a NCTJ certificate in newspaper journalism from Lambeth College.

== Career ==
After graduation, Flyn worked as a reporter for The Sunday Times and The Daily Telegraph. She left her job in 2012 to work at a dog-sledding kennels in Finnish Lapland. Flyn is the deputy editor of the literary recommendations website Five Books

She was made a MacDowell Fellow in 2019. In 2022, she was declared 'Young Writer of the Year' by The Sunday Times.

She is the author of nonfiction books Islands of Abandonment: Life in the Post-Human Landscape (2022) and Thicker Than Water: History, Secrets, and Guilt (2016), and has published essays and articles in Granta, The Guardian, The Wall Street Journal, The Sunday Times Magazine, and other publications.

== Works ==
Her first book, Thicker Than Water, tells the story of a distant relative, Angus McMillan, who is believed to have been one of the ringleaders of the Gippsland massacres of Gunaikurnai aboriginal people. Her second book, Islands of Abandonment, is an exploration of places where nature is reclaiming lands once occupied by humans, such as Plymouth, Montserrat, and Chernobyl.

Islands of Abandonment won the John Burroughs Medal for natural history writing. It was also shortlisted for the 2021 Wainwright Prize for writing on global conservation, the 2021 Baillie Gifford Prize for Non-Fiction, the Royal Society of Literature's Ondaatje Prize and the British Academy Book Prize, among others.

Flyn's third book The Savage Landscape was published in 2026.

== Personal life ==
Flyn lives in the Orkney Islands.

== Selected publications ==
- Thicker Than Water: History, Secrets and Guilt: A Memoir (2016, William Collins: ISBN 978-0008126605)
- Islands of Abandonment: Life in the Post-Human Landscape (2020, William Collins: ISBN 978-0008329761)
- The Savage Landscape: How we made the wilderness (2026, William Collins: ISBN 978-0008686529)
