= Bird Watching (magazine) =

British magazine

- Cover of May 2011 issue, showing a Corncrake
- Editor: Matt Merritt
- Frequency: Monthly
- Circulation: 20,660 Jan–Dec 2022
- First issue: March 1986
- Country: United Kingdom
- Based in: Peterborough
- Website: www.birdwatching.co.uk
- ISSN: 0269-1434

Bird Watching (ISSN 0269-1434) is a British four-weekly (13 issues per year) magazine for birdwatchers, established in March 1986. Distributed by subscription and also through newsagents, it has, as of September 2023, a cover price of £5.25.

== History and profile ==
Bird Watching was established in 1986. Key content areas include bird identification, birdwatching site guides, recent sightings from across the UK, book and equipment reviews and news.

Its contributors include notable birders such as Dominic Couzens and David Lindo.

Originally published by EMAP, the magazine is published monthly by Bauer Consumer Media of Peterborough. Its ABC-certified total average net circulation per issue for 2022 was 20,660, of which 2,530 were newsagent sales and 17,950 went to subscribers.

== Editors ==
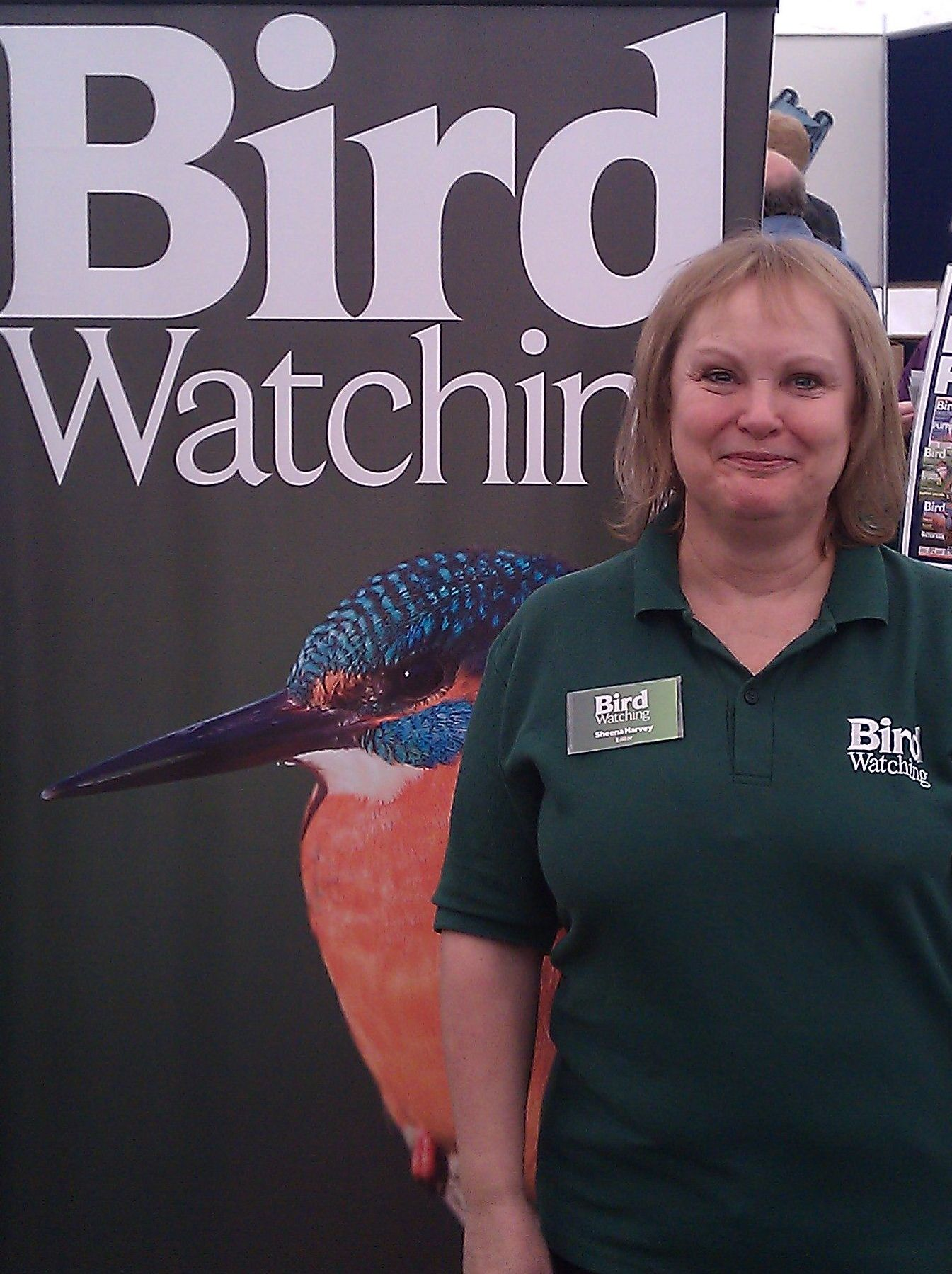
Former editor Sheena Harvey at a birdwatchers' fair at Middleton Hall on 21 May 2011

Bird Watching has had five editors:

- Chris Dawn (1986–88)
- David Cromack (1988–2006)
- Kevin Wilmot (2006–2008)
- Sheena Harvey (2008–2011)
- Matt Merritt (2011–)

== See also ==
- List of ornithology journals
