= RSPB Medal =

Award granted by the Royal Society for the Protection of Birds

The RSPB Medal is awarded annually by the Royal Society for the Protection of Birds.

According to the RSPB:

The RSPB Medal is the Society's most prestigious award. It is presented to an individual in recognition of wild bird protection and countryside conservation. It is usually awarded annually to one or occasionally two people.

The medal was first awarded in 1908.

== Recipients ==
- Rt Hon John Gummer
- Prof Chris Perrins FRS (1992)
- Bill Oddie (1997)
- Chris Mead (1999)
- Sir David Attenborough (2000)
- Robert Gillmor (2003)
- Professor Chris Baines (2004)
- Dr Colin Bibby (2004)
- Michael McCarthy (2007)
- Dr Jeff Watson (2007)
- Charles, Prince of Wales (2011)
- Prof John Lawton FRS (2011)
- Tristan da Cunha community (2012)
- Peter Harrison (2012)
- Prof Robert Watson (2013)
- The BTO, Birdwatch Ireland and SOC team who produced the Bird Atlas (2014)
- Stanley Johnson (2015)
- Prof Georgina Mace FRS (2016)
- Dick Potts (2017)
- Caroline Lucas (2018)
- Dara McAnulty (youngest ever recipient 2019)
- Climate Coalition NI and Alastair Fothergill (2023)
- Martin Lines, founder of the Nature Friendly Farming Network (2025).

== See also ==
- List of environmental awards
