= Kerri ní Dochartaigh =

Northern Irish writer (born 1983)

- Born: 1983 (age 42–43); Derry, Northern Ireland
- Education: Trinity College Dublin

Kerri ní Dochartaigh (born 1983) is a Northern Irish writer known for her nature writings. She has published in The Guardian, The Irish Times and elsewhere, and her debut book Thin Places was shortlisted for the Wainwright Prize in 2021.

== Biography ==
ní Dochartaigh was born in 1983 in Derry in Northern Ireland, near the Irish border. Her mother was Catholic and her father Protestant, and when she was aged 11, living in the Waterside area, their home was petrol-bombed in the night. The family moved to a Catholic area, and then out of the town to Ballykelly, 20 miles away. When she was 16, a boy she was friends with was murdered an hour after she had seen him, and his murderer has not been identified.

She read English Literature and Classics at Trinity College Dublin. She then taught for periods in Rudolf Steiner schools in Edinburgh and Bristol.

== Writing career ==
ní Dochartaigh has published in The Guardian, The Irish Times, Winter Papers, Caught By The River and elsewhere,

Her 2021 book Thin Places was published by Canongate Books after a six-way contest between publishers. It is "a mixture of memoir, history and nature writing" and describes "a wild Ireland, an invisible border, an old conflict and the healing power of the natural world". Thin Places was shortlisted for the 2021 Wainwright Prize for UK Nature Writing, and won the Butler Literary Award for 2022 from the Irish American Cultural Institute.

In March 2021 ní Dochartaigh featured in BBC Radio 4's series The Outsiders: "Five writers on how a year of lockdowns has changed their relationship with the nature on their doorstep", and in August 2021 she appeared at the Edinburgh International Book Festival, online, along with composer and writer Kerry Andrew.

In 2023, ní Dochartaigh published Cacophony of bone, which chronicles her life in a remote cottage in central Ireland from 2019 to 2020. It was longlisted for the Wainwright Prize for Nature Writing.

== Personal life ==
As of 2021 she lives "in an old railway cottage in the very heart of Ireland" with her partner and her dog.

== Selected publications ==
=== Books ===
- Thin places. Edinburgh: Canongate. 2021. ISBN 978-1786899637.
- Cacophony of Bone. Edinburgh: Canongate. 2023. ISBN 978-1838856304.

=== Other writings ===
- "Unnameable Things". The Clearing. Little Toller Books. 26 February 2019.
- "Kerri Ní Dochartaigh on 2021: 'One thing is certain, and that is that there still is hope'". TheJournal.ie. 28 January 2021.
- "Shadows and Reflections: Kerri ní Dochartaigh". www.caughtbytheriver.net. Caught by the River. 12 January 2020.
- "In search of light on the edge of Ireland". The Guardian. 14 February 2021.
