= Concretopia =

2013 book by John Grindrod

- Author: John Grindrod
- Publisher: Old Street Publishing
- Pages: 439
- ISBN: 9781906964900
- OCLC: 855200507

Concretopia: A Journey Around the Rebuilding of Postwar Britain is a 2013 book by John Grindrod covering architecture in Britain in the post-war consensus period, i.e. approximately 1945 to 1979.

The book covers themes including pre-fabricated housing, the Festival of Britain, Brutalism, Span housing, tower blocks, corruption, and the New Towns.
