= David Lindo =

British birdwatcher and author

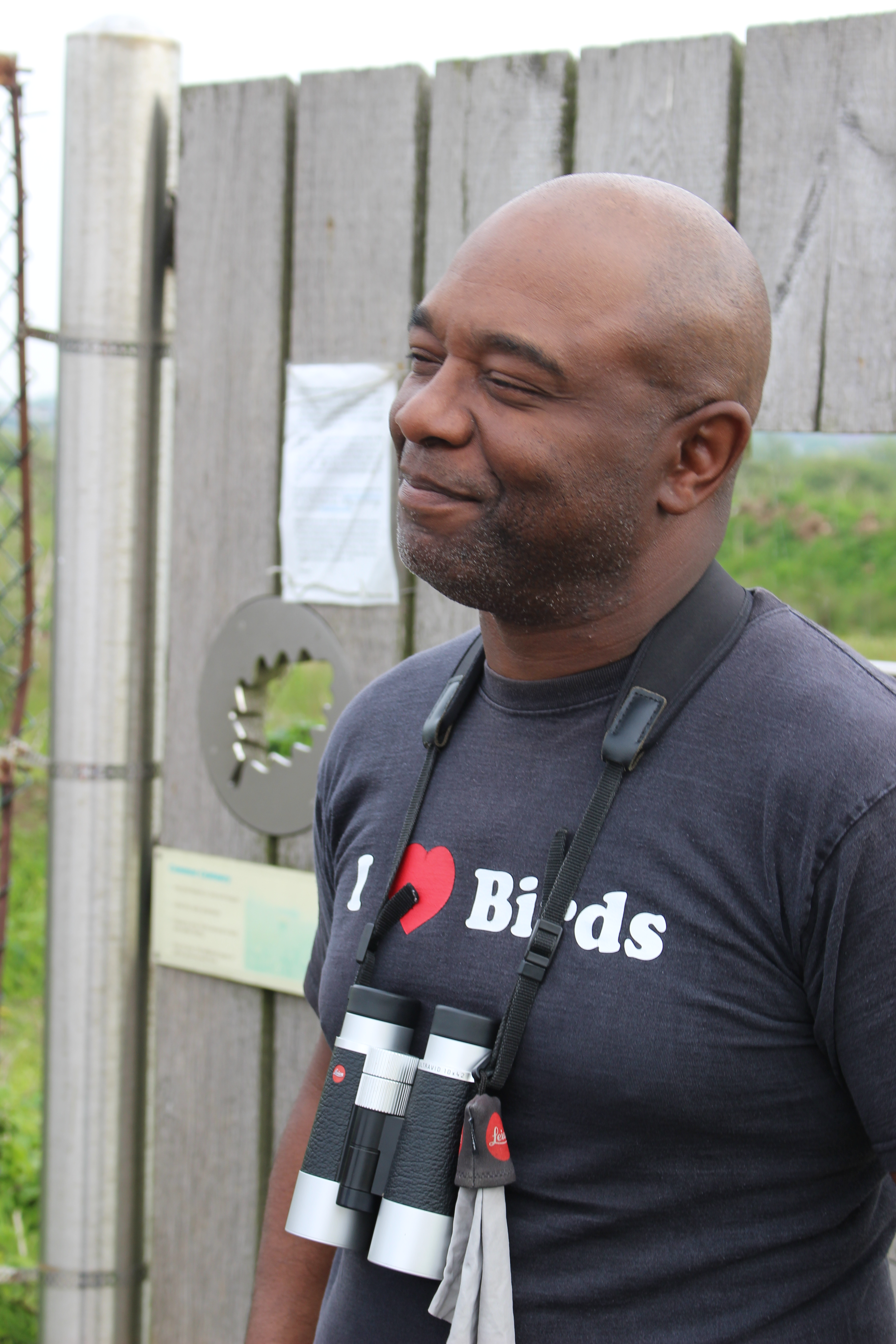
David Lindo in 2016

David Lindo is a British birdwatcher and author. Also known as the Urban Birder, he is a regular contributor to the Bird Watching magazine and has written a number of books including The Urban Birder, published in 2011 and How to be an Urban Birder, published in 2014. More recent publications include a books for children, The Extraordinary World of Birds, published in 2022 and FLY: A Family Guide to Birds and How to Spot Them, published in 2023. He is a vice-president of the Wildfowl & Wetlands Trust. He is a regular guest presenter on BBC Radio 4's Tweet of the Day, where he has spoken about the osprey, European robin and common kestrel and has also made appearances on TV shows such as Countryfile, The One Show and The Alan Titchmarsh Show. He launched a campaign in 2015 to find Britain's national bird and after more than 224,000 votes had been cast the robin was declared the winner, beating the barn owl and the common blackbird.

Lindo has been named by BBC Wildlife Magazine as one of the most influential people in wildlife. In 2021, the Linnean Society of London presented Lindo with the H. H. Bloomer Award, given to an amateur naturalist deemed to have made "an important contribution to the knowledge of natural history".

== Early life ==
He grew up in Wembley in north-west London. He went to Cardinal Hinsley Catholic Boys School in nearby Harlesden.

== Bibliography ==
- The Urban Birder (2011) ISBN 978-1780095011
- How to be an Urban Birder (2014) ISBN 978-1847739506
- Tales from Concrete Jungles: Urban Birding Around the World (2015) ISBN 978-0691179629
- The Extraordinary World of Birds (2022) ISBN 9780744050080
