= Eating to Extinction =

2022 book by Dan Saladino

Eating to Extinction: The World's Rarest Foods and Why We Need to Save Them
- Author: Dan Saladino
- Language: English
- Subject: Rare foods
- Publisher: Farrar, Straus and Giroux
- Publication date: February 1, 2022
- Pages: 464
- ISBN: 978-0-374-60532-2

Eating to Extinction: The World's Rarest Foods and Why We Need to Save Them is a 2022 book by Dan Saladino that examines rare foods. The book won the 2022 Wainwright Prize for Writing on Conservation.
