= Elizabeth-Jane Burnett =

English poet

Elizabeth-Jane Burnett is a poet and academic who is known for her publications in nature writing. Following her PhD studies in contemporary poetics, which led to the publication of a monograph titled A Social Biography of Contemporary Innovative Poetry Communities (2017), she published two full-length poetry collections and held positions as Senior Lecturer in Creative Writing at Birmingham Newman University and Leverhulme Research Fellow for 2021–22. She continues teaching at Northumbria University. Her work covers place, environment, and family heritage, and she curates ecopoetic exhibitions.

== Early life and education ==
Burnett was born in Devon. Her mother is Kenyan while her father was born to a farming family in Ide, Devon. She studied English at Oxford, after which she attended Royal Holloway, University of London, to study for an MA and PhD in Contemporary Poetics.

Burnett also studied performance at the Bowery Poetry Club in New York and Naropa.

== Career ==
Burnett has published two poetry collections with Penned in the Margins, Swims (2017) and Of Sea (2021). Both books are concerned with the environment and activism, and Burnett is interested in how "poetry can raise consciousness by bringing the effects of climate change or pollution to life." Swims documents experiences of wild swimming across the England and Wales, and was featured as a Sunday Times Poetry Book of the Year in 2017. Of Sea is a type of "poetic bestiary" with 46 poems that describe encounters with various invertebrate marine fauna inhabiting salt marshes and coastal tidepools. An early note in the collection implies that these encounters occur while swimming, as if it's an extension of Swims, continuing a "fluid perspective of an intriguing poetic project." She published Rivering, a pamphlet of poems, with Oystercatcher Press in 2019.

Her PhD thesis was published as A Social Biography of Contemporary Innovative Poetry Communities: The Gift, the Wager, and Poethics (2017) by Palgrave Macmillan.

Her poetry features in the anthologies Dear World and Everyone In It: New Poetry in the UK (Bloodaxe, 2013) and Out of Everywhere 2: Linguistically Innovative Poetry by Women in North America and the UK (Reality Street, 2015). Wasafiri 106: The Water Issue (2021) features three poems by Burnett.

The Grassling: A Geological Memoir (2019) was a winner of the Penguin Random House WriteNow Award.

In 2021, Burnett was commissioned by the National Trust to create a poem responding to nature observations made by members of the public.

== Awards ==
Burnett was named in the 10th Anniversary Shortlist for the James Cropper Wainwright Prize, for her book of poetry, nature-writing, and memoire, Twelve Words for Moss.

== Publications ==
=== Academic work / monograph ===
- A Social Biography of Contemporary Innovative Poetry Communities: The Gift, the Wager, and Poethics (2017)

=== Poetry collections or pamphlets ===
- Swims (2017)
- Rivering (2019)
- Of Sea (2021)

=== Memoir ===
- The Grassling: A Geological Memoir (2019)

=== Anthology contributions ===
- Dear World and Everyone In It: New Poetry in the UK (2013)
- Out of Everywhere 2: Linguistically Innovative Poetry by Women in North America and the UK (2015)
- Wasafiri 106: The Water Issue (2021)
