= The Wild Life: A Year of Living on Wild Food =

2009 book by John Lewis-Stempel

- Cover of the edition published by Black Swan on 18 March 2010
- Author: John Lewis-Stempel
- Language: English
- Subject: Nature, Survival, Foraging
- Publisher: Doubleday
- Publication date: 21 May 2009
- Publication place: United Kingdom
- Media type: Print
- Pages: 304

The Wild Life: A Year of Living on Wild Food is a 2009 non-fiction book by British author John Lewis-Stempel. It documents his experiment of spending a full year eating only food that he could hunt, gather, or forage from his forty-acre farm.

== Overview ==
In The Wild Life, John Lewis-Stempel embarks on a year-long journey of subsisting entirely on wild food. His experiences range from training a reluctant gundog, Edith, to concocting new recipes with his foraged findings. Lewis-Stempel's approach is not only about survival but also about gaining a deeper understanding and appreciation of the land.

== Reception ==
The book received acclaim for its honest and engaging portrayal of living off the land. Robert Macfarlane, author of The Wild Places, praised it for its blend of humor, honesty, and insightful commentary on the land. The Sunday Telegraph highlighted its fascinating account and meditative quality. The Ecologist described it as an "initiatory and spiritual journey", "a life lesson for us all".

== Themes ==
The Wild Life explores themes of survival, human-nature connection, and the concept of land as both a resource and a sanctuary. Lewis-Stempel's journey concerns both physical survival and the rediscovery of a lost connection to the natural world. The book covers the philosophical and ethical dimensions of foraging and living off the land in the modern world.
