= Dominique Palmer =

British climate activist

Dominique Palmer FRSA
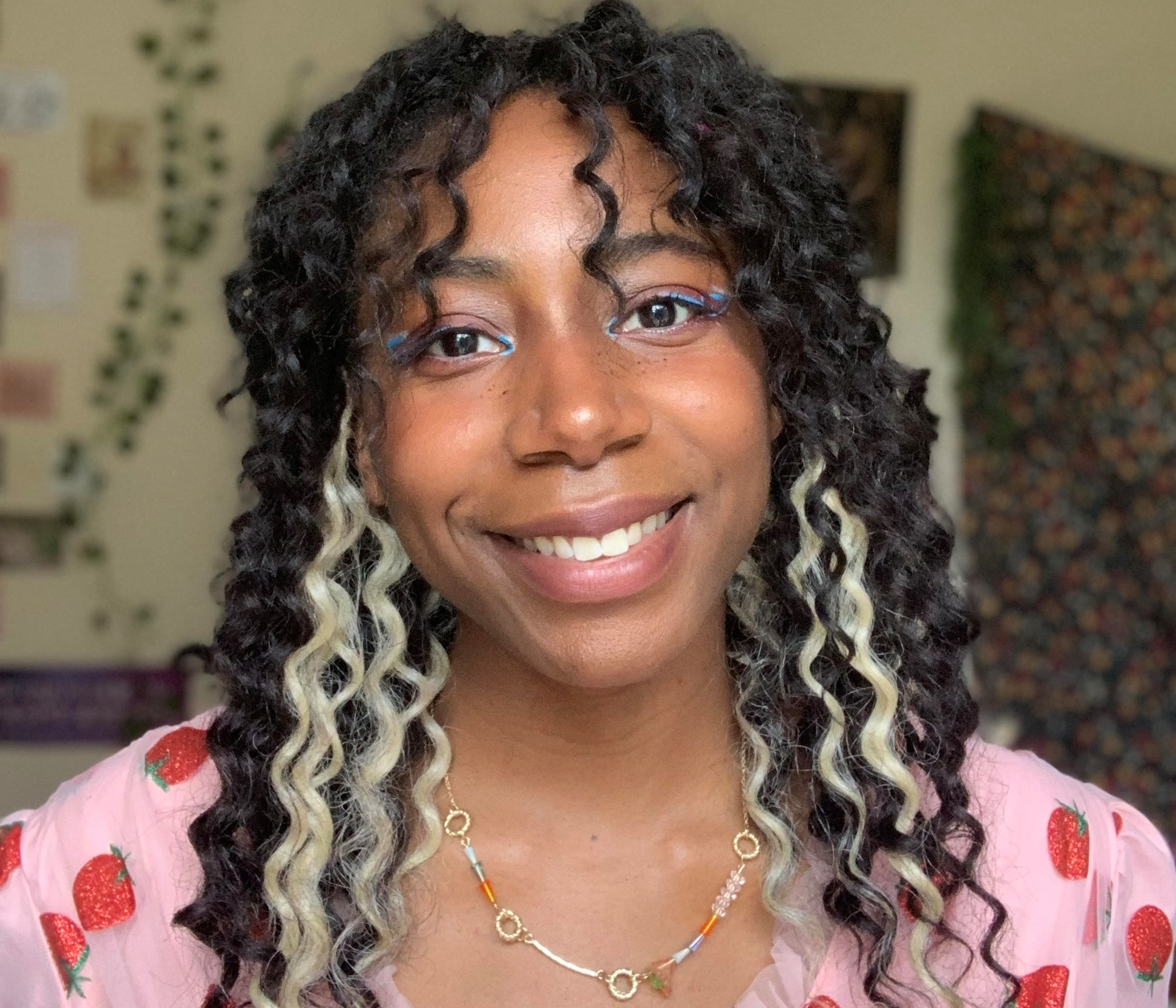
- Palmer in 2023
- Born: 1999 (age 26–27)
- Education: University of Birmingham
- Occupation: Environmental advocate
- Movement: Climate movement

Dominique Palmer (born 1999) is a British climate justice activist and student. She spoke at the 2019 United Nations Climate Change Conference, and began her activism in the School Strike for Climate Movement.

== Life and activism ==
Palmer grew up in London. She studied Political Science and International Relations at the University of Birmingham. She started her activism in London and became an organizer for the school strike for climate in the United Kingdom. During the COVID pandemic, she participated in the #ClimateStrikeOnline.

Palmer focuses on intersectionality and marginalized communities within her activism, and diversity in the environmental movement. She has used this in her lobbying activities, where she pressured MPs to pass The Wellbeing of Future Generations Bill introduced by Lord Bird.

During her activism, she focuses on the intersectional nature of the climate crisis. On a New York Times Hub Panel at the 26th United Nations Climate Change Conference. Palmer said that "the exploitation of natural resources and people are linked."

Palmer also focuses on utilizing music and the arts. She is an organizer for Climate Live. Palmer recorded a song for Earth Day with Titiyo, hosted at Billie Eilish's Overheated event. She also focuses on Eco-Anxiety in young people related to climate change.

Alongside fellow activists, she has led the campaign in #cleanupStandardChartered. She is one of 12 Fridays For Future organizers who wrote open letters for the campaign, one pressuring the CEO to "stop fueling the climate crisis", and another to Joe Biden and Kamala Harris, saying that "our present and future depend on the actions your government takes within the next four years." She also co-founded the initiative "Pass The Mic", a campaign that asks influential people and organizations to "turn the spotlight on to frontline climate activists and those who are most affected by the crisis".

== Personal life ==
In February 2026, Palmer announced her engagement to her boyfriend, Connor.

== Filmography ==
- Climate carnage: whose job is it to save the planet? (2022)
