= The Shepherd's Life =

2015 book by James Rebanks

The Shepherd's Life: A Tale of the Lake District
- Cover of 2015 UK Hardback
- Author: James Rebanks
- Publisher: Allen Lane
- Publication date: 2 April 2015
- Pages: 320
- ISBN: 978-1846148545

The Shepherd's Life: A Tale of the Lake District is an autobiographical book by James Rebanks, a sheep farmer from Matterdale, Cumbria, England, published by Allen Lane in 2015.

Rebanks writes that he was moved and inspired by another book with almost the same title, A Shepherd's Life by W.H. Hudson, who wrote about sheep-farming in Wiltshire in the early years of the 20th century.

Rebanks describes the traditional way of life of shepherds on the Cumbrian fells and vales, and his determination to continue to farm where generations of his forebears had done. After an unsuccessful school education, he studied for A levels in evening classes and graduated from Magdalen College, Oxford University, with a double first in history before returning to farming.

== Other editions ==
The book appeared in the United States as The Shepherd's Life: Modern Dispatches from an Ancient Landscape (Flatiron books, ISBN 978-1250060242). There is also a large print edition, with the same title, by Thorndike Press ISBN 978-1410484550. A German translation Mein Leben als Schäfer was published in 2016 (Bertelsmann: ISBN 978-3570102916)

== Critical reception ==
Rebanks' book was well-received and was the BBC Radio 4 Book of the Week in April 2015.

== Theatrical adaptation ==
The book was adapted for the stage by Chris Monks and produced at Theatre by the Lake, Keswick, in March 2016. The theatrical production included life-sized puppet sheepdogs and sheep, with James being played by Kieran Hill.
