= Our Biggest Experiment =

2021 book by Alice Bell

Our Biggest Experiment: An Epic History of the Climate Crisis
- Author: Alice Bell
- Language: English
- Publication date: September 2021
- Publication place: United States
- ISBN: 978-1-64009-433-8

Our Biggest Experiment: An Epic History of the Climate Crisis is a book by British writer Alice Bell, published by Counterpoint in September 2021. Reviewed in Foreign Policy, BuzzFeed News, New Statesman, and Undark Magazine, the book unrolls the history of human concern for weather derangement and climate change along the latest centuries to its present scientific systematization and public prominence.
