= Isaias Hernandez =

Environmental educator

Isaias Hernandez is an environmental educator advocating for social justice and accessibility in the environmental movement. He is better known by his Instagram moniker and social media platform, Queer Brown Vegan, where he provides information to his over 120,000 followers about environmental justice, veganism and a zero-waste lifestyle, as well as the intersectionality of social and ecological issues.

== Early life ==
Hernandez grew up as a first-generation Mexican American in Sylmar, a low-income neighborhood in Los Angeles, amid heavy traffic and pollution. His firsthand experiences with environmental injustice, such as the disparities in access to clean air and green spaces in Los Angeles, shaped his interest in the environment, social justice, and equity. He went on to earn his B.S. in Environmental Science at the University of California, Berkeley, where he began working on diversity inclusion in environmental and creative spaces.

== Activism ==
In November 2019, Hernandez, then 23 years old, created his Instagram account, @queerbrownvegan, as a safe space to make intersectional environmental education more accessible to all, but especially to marginalized groups such as the LGBTQ+ and BIPOC communities. His focus stems from the observation that climate change and environmental disasters tend to affect low income people of color the most, but also that the organizations created to help these communities aren't always accepting of LGBTQ+ people.

In January 2023, he appeared on the cover of Vogue alongside Billie Eilish and seven other young environmental activists. Additionally, Hernandez has been featured in numerous publications like The New York Times, Time Magazine, The Boston Globe, The Washington Post, Rolling Stone and Teen Vogue. In 2023, Hernandez received a Trailblazer Award at Verdical Group's annual Net Zero Conference.

Hernandez is based in Los Angeles as a full-time content creator and public speaker.
