= Where Poppies Blow =

2017 book by John Lewis-Stempel

Where Poppies Blow: The British Soldier, Nature, The Great War
- Author: John Lewis-Stempel
- Language: English
- Subject: World War I, Nature
- Publisher: Weidenfeld & Nicolson
- Publication date: 14 September 2017
- Publication place: United Kingdom
- Media type: Print
- Pages: 400

Where Poppies Blow: The British Soldier, Nature, The Great War is a non-fiction book by British author John Lewis-Stempel, focusing on the relationship between British soldiers and nature during World War I. The book explores how nature provided solace, distraction, and a sense of normalcy amidst the horrors of war.

== Summary ==
The book examines the profound connection between soldiers of the Great War and nature. It details how soldiers found comfort in bird-watching, gardening, and interacting with animals. Lewis-Stempel recounts the experiences of soldiers like Private Norman Edwards, who found beauty in the natural world despite the war's grim realities. The narrative also addresses the harsher aspects of nature in wartime.

== Reception ==
Where Poppies Blow received critical acclaim for its unique perspective and emotional depth. The Financial Times described it as a "painstakingly researched and deeply moving account," highlighting Lewis-Stempel's skill in blending history with nature writing. The Guardian praised the book for its insightful portrayal of soldiers' relationship with nature. The Times review was positive, emphasizing the book's contribution to the high standard of nature writing in the UK. The Last Word Book Review also gave an affirmative critique, noting Lewis-Stempel's ability to vividly bring to life the flora and fauna of the war.
