= James Rebanks =

English writer and sheep farmer

- Born: 1974 (age 51–52)
- Education: University of Oxford (BA)
- Awards: Wainwright Prize for Nature Writing (2021)
- Writing career
- Genre: Pastoral
- Notable work: The Shepherd's Life

James Rebanks (born 1974) is an English sheep farmer and author, from Matterdale in Cumbria. His first book, the autobiography The Shepherd's Life, was published in 2015, and he published English Pastoral in 2020. He also published The Illustrated Herdwick Shepherd in 2015 and The Shepherd's View: Modern Photographs from an Ancient Landscape in 2016.

== Early life and education ==
Rebanks left school at the age of 16 to work on his family's farm with two GCSEs in woodworking and religious studies. He took A levels at evening classes in Carlisle before studying at Magdalen College, Oxford, where he achieved a double first in history.

== Career ==
Following his degree, Rebanks returned to farming, which he continues to do, specialising in Herdwick sheep but moving towards a more mixed farm. He has also run a consultancy based at his farm. He was involved in the bid for the Lake District to receive World Heritage status (which was approved by UNESCO in 2017), and as of December 2020 had a following of 141,667 on Twitter as "Herdwick Shepherd" (@herdyshepherd1).

In 2018 he resigned from a government panel set up by Secretary of State for Environment, Food and Rural Affairs Michael Gove, and also took a break from Twitter after the composition of the panel was criticised by environmentalists as being biased towards the farming community.

In 2019 he appeared on BBC Radio 4's Desert Island Discs. His chosen music included tracks by Rachmaninoff, Nina Simone, and Kirsty MacColl (the choice he would rescue from the waves); his chosen book was The Old Man and the Sea by Ernest Hemingway, and his luxury was pen and paper. He has also appeared on BBC Radio 3's Private Passions and Radio 4's On Your Farm. In December 2021 he guest-edited Radio 4's Today programme.

In 2021 English Pastoral won the Wainwright Prize in the Nature Writing category.

He spent a season on the island of Færøy in the Vega Archipelago off northern Norway, learning about the traditional practice of caring for wild eider ducks and gathering their down. His book describing this time, The Place of Tides, was shortlisted for the Stanford Travel Book of the Year in 2025.

== Selected publications ==
- The Shepherd's Life: A Tale of the Lake District. London: Allen Lane. 2 April 2015. ISBN 978-1846148545.
- The Illustrated Herdwick Shepherd. London: Penguin Books. 5 November 2015. ISBN 9781846148903.
- The Shepherd's View: Modern Photographs from an Ancient Landscape. London: Flatiron. 18 October 2016. ISBN 978-1250103369.
- English Pastoral: an inheritance. London: Allen Lane. 3 September 2020. ISBN 9780241245729. (published in North America as Pastoral Song: A Farmer’s Journey. 3 August 2021. Custom House. ISBN 978-0063073272)
- The Place of Tides. Allen Lane. 17 October 2024. ISBN 978-0241426937.
