= And So I Roar =

2024 novel by Abi Daré

And So I Roar is a novel written by Nigerian author Abi Daré. Published by Dutton in 2024, it won the 2025 Climate Fiction Prize.
