= Cawston and Marsham Heaths =

Protected area in Norfolk, England

Coordinates: 52.767°N 1.214°E

- Site of Special Scientific Interest
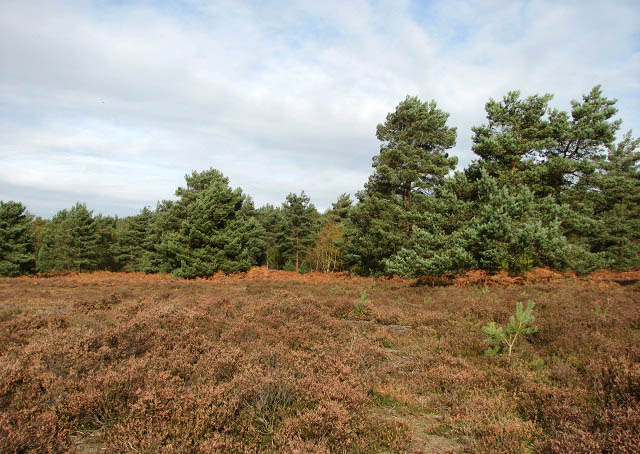
- Location of Cawston and Marsham Heaths.
- Area of search: Norfolk
- Grid reference: TG 169 237
- Interest: Biological
- Area: 116.7 hectares (288 acres)
- Notification date: 1986
- Location map: Magic Map

Cawston and Marsham Heaths is a 116.7-hectare (288-acre) biological Site of Special Scientific Interest north of Norwich in Norfolk, England.

These heaths are dominated by heather, and they have diverse flora including a rich variety of lichens. Many species of heathland birds breed on the site, including tree pipits, whinchats and nightjars.

The heaths are open to the public.
