= Meadowland: The Private Life of an English Field =

Meadowland
- Author: John Lewis-Stempel
- Language: English
- Subject: Nature, English countryside
- Publisher: Penguin Random House
- Publication date: 2014
- Publication place: United Kingdom
- Media type: Print

Meadowland: The Private Life of an English Field is a non-fiction book by British author John Lewis-Stempel, focusing on the natural history of an English field throughout a year. The book provides a detailed account of the flora and fauna of the English countryside and is notable for its deep observation and reflection on nature.

== Background ==
John Lewis-Stempel, an experienced farmer and historian, writes from personal experience and deep connection with the English countryside. Meadowland offers insight into the seasonal changes and wildlife of a meadow, reflecting the author's intimate knowledge and relationship with the land.

== Summary ==
In Meadowland, Lewis-Stempel chronicles a year in the life of a field on his farm in Herefordshire, detailing the interaction of plants, animals, and the changing seasons. The narrative combines personal diary entries with natural history, providing a comprehensive view of rural life and nature.

== Reception ==
Meadowland received positive reviews for its detailed observation and lyrical prose. The Guardian described it as a "fascinating field study" and praised its detailed account of rural wildlife. Caught by the River highlighted the book's intimate detail and engaging narrative. The book is also featured in the London Review Bookshop's list of notable works by the author.

== See also ==
- John Lewis-Stempel
