= John Grindrod (author) =

English author

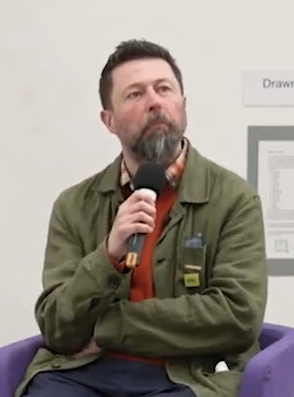
Grindrod at Milton Keynes Lit Fest in 2023

John Grindrod (born 1970) is a social historian and author of books about people and place. He is from Croydon, London.

== Works ==
Grindrod's first book, Concretopia: A Journey Around the Rebuilding of Postwar Britain (2013), covers British architecture and New Towns in the post-war consensus period from 1945 and 1979.

His second book, Outskirts: Living Life on the Edge of the Greenbelt (2017), is a mix of memoir and investigation of the Metropolitan Green Belt, which surrounds New Addington where Grindrod's family lived. This book was shortlisted for the 2018 Wainwright Prize.

His third book, Iconicon: A Journey around the Landmark Building of Contemporary Britain (2022), covers British architecture from 1979 to the present day, including Barratt housing, Canary Wharf and the national devolution buildings in Wales, Scotland and Northern Ireland. This book was shortlisted for the 2023 Architectural Book Awards.

His fourth book, Tales of the Suburbs: LGBTQ+ Lives Behind Net Curtains (2026), is based around a series of original interviews with LGBTQ+ people about their experiences of living in suburbia in the UK.

Grindrod has written for the Guardian, the Financial Times, the Twentieth-Century Society Magazine, the Big Issue and The Modernist.

He also hosts the podcast Monstrosities Mon Amour.

== Bibliography ==
- Concretopia, 2013
- Outskirts, 2017
- How To Love Brutalism, 2018
- Iconicon: A Journey Around the Landmark Buildings of Contemporary Britain, 2022 (Faber)
- Tales of the Suburbs: LGBTQ+ Lives Behind Net Curtains, 2026
