= Emily Sutton =

English illustrator

Emily Sutton (born 1983) is an English illustrator. She is known for her illustrations in children's picture books inspired by vintage artwork and old objects.

== Early life and education ==
Sutton was born in North Yorkshire in 1983. She spent the first four years of her childhood living on her family farm in the Yorkshire Wolds. As a child, she loved picture books, especially those filled with detail like those by Maurice Sendak and Richard Scarry. She went to Bootham School. She studied at the Edinburgh College of Art, graduating in 2008. She also attended York College and the Rhode Island School of Design.

== Career ==
After graduating from university in 2008, Sutton started working professionally as an illustrator, specializing in the illustration of children's books. She takes inspiration from the work of Eric Ravilious, Edward Bawden, and lithographed children's books from the United States. She often features objects she has found in museums and antique shops. She has designed packaging for a number of brands including Bettys and Taylors of Harrogate, Charlie Bigham's, and Fortnum & Mason.

In 2014, Sutton had a solo exhibition titled Emily Sutton Town and Country, at Yorkshire Sculpture Park. The exhibition featured paintings, screen prints, and handmade birds. For Christmas 2023, she designed the Neverland-themed artwork for the annual Christmas show at Castle Howard. As of 2023, she has illustrated over twenty children's picture books, collaborating with a number of authors including Anne Twist, Nicola Davies, Michael Bond, and Katherine Rundell.

In 2024, Sutton illustrated Shakespeare's First Folio: All The Plays: A Children's Edition, an abridged edition of William Shakespeare's First Folio for children. The book was sponsored by the Shakespeare Birthplace Trust and edited by Anjna Chouhan, a teacher and scholar at the charity. Journalist Meghan Cox Gurdon, writing in the Wall Street Journal, noted that Sutton had "lavishly illustrated" each play's cast, including images of "red-cheeked gentlemen, sword-wielding warriors and ladies in striking attire."

== Awards and honours ==
In 2011, Sutton was awarded the Elle Decoration British Design Award for her Curiosity Shop fabric. In 2015, the book Tiny: The Invisible World of Microbes which Sutton illustrated won an AAAS award for best picture book. That year, the book also was nominated for a CILIP Kate Greenaway Medal. In 2017, The Times and The Guardian named One Christmas Wish by Katherine Rundell and illustrated by Sutton as one of the best children's books of the year. The book tells the story of a boy who is left home alone on Christmas with a babysitter by his parents. After making a wish on a shooting star to be "un-alone", four Christmas decorations come to life. In 2021, the National Science Teaching Association named Grow: Secrets of Our DNA one of the Outstanding Science Trade Books of the year.

== Personal life ==
Sutton lives in a Victorian terraced house in Yorkshire with her schnoodle Mouse.

== Books ==
=== Illustrator ===
- Clara Button and the Magical Hat Day (2011)
- Clara Button and the Wedding Day Surprise (2013)
- Tiny: The Invisible World of Microbes (2014)
- The Christmas Eve Tree (2015)
- The Tale of the Castle Mice (2016)
- Lots: The Diversity of Life on Earth, published as Many: The Diversity of Life on Earth in the United States (2017)
- One Christmas Wish (2017)
- A First Book of the Sea (2018)
- The Ups and Downs of the Castle Mice (2019)
- Ernestine's Milky Way (2019)
- Grow: Secrets of Our DNA (2020)
- Jumbo: The Most Famous Elephant Who Ever Lived (2020)
- The Season of Giraffes (2022)
- Courage Like Kate: The True Story of a Girl Lighthouse Keeper (2022)
- Betty and the Mysterious Visitor (2023)
- Green: The Story of Plant Life on Our Planet (2024)
- The World to Come (2024)
- King Winter's Birthday (2025)

=== Author ===
- Penny and the Little Lost Puppy (2021)
- Emily Sutton's Toy Shop (2024)
