= Helen Scales =

British marine biologist

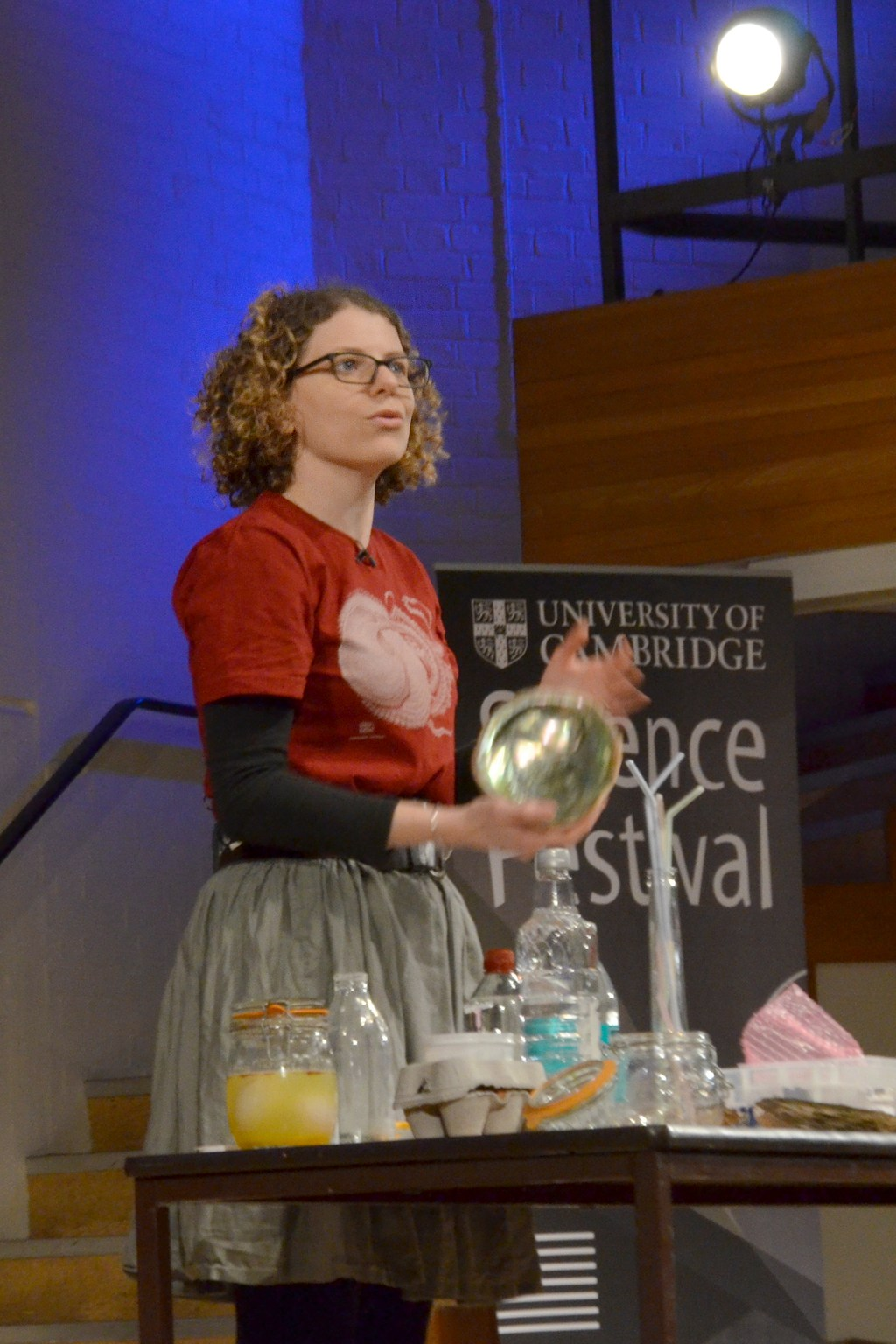
- Scales describing molluscs at the 2015 Cambridge Science Festival
- Education: St John's College, Cambridge
- Occupations: Marine biologist, broadcaster and writer

Helen Scales is a British marine biologist, broadcaster and writer.

== Personal life and education ==
Helen Scales learnt to scuba dive when she was 16 as part of the Duke of Edinburgh's Award, and from this experience wanted to know more about life underwater.

She studied at St John's College, Cambridge, as an undergraduate and holds an M.Sc. degree in Tropical Coastal Management from the University of Newcastle Upon Tyne. Scales was awarded a Ph.D. from St John's College, Cambridge, in 2005; her thesis title was "Exploitation of coral reef fish for the live reef fish trade". This was particularly about the humphead wrasse. She was able to identify individual fish through the colour patterns on their heads after filming the fish underwater and so study their movement and behaviour.

== Career ==
Scales worked for several conservation organisations after gaining her doctorate, including the World Wide Fund for Nature, TRAFFIC International, the International Union for Conservation of Nature and Natural Resources and Natural England. She was later appointed as a tutor for the University of Cambridge Institute of Continuing Education. Her scientific interests and research focus on marine conservation and the inter-relations between people and oceans, particularly in the context of habitat protection and the international wildlife trade.

== Public communication ==
Her 2009 book Poseidon's Steed, on seahorses, was described by the reviewer for The Economist as "a fascinating book ... Scales ... explains the myth, biology and ecology of what the Victorians called 'queer fish'." while in National Geographic the reviewer called it "a compelling book about seahorses that makes the case not only for these odd fish but also for the entire ocean."

In October 2011, she appeared on BBC Radio 4's The Museum of Curiosity. Her hypothetical donation to this fictional museum was a tank full of seahorses. In 2013, she spoke at a TEDx event, TEDxLSE, at the London School of Economics. In April 2018, Scales was a judge for the UK finals of the FameLab competition. In 2021, she was a guest on the BBC Radio 4 programme The Life Scientific.

Her 2024 book What the Wild Sea Can Be: The Future of the World's Ocean was shortlisted for the 2025 Women's Prize for Non-Fiction.

== Selected publications ==
Scales is the author or co-author of scientific publications and book chapters as well as popular science books and magazine articles. These include:

- With Andrew Balmford and Andrea Manica (2007), "Impacts of the live reef fish trade on populations of coral reef fish off northern Borneo", Proceedings of the Royal Society B, 274, 989–994.
- Poseidon's Steed: The Story of Seahorses, from Myth to Reality. 2009, Gotham Books, ISBN 9781592404742.
- The Underwater Museum: the submerged sculptures of Jason deCaires Taylor / essays by Carlo McCormick and Helen Scales. 2014, Chronicle Books, ISBN 9781452118871.
- Spirals in Time: The Secret Life and Curious Afterlife of Seashells. 2015, Bloomsbury Sigma, ISBN 978-1472911360.
- Eye of the Shoal: A Fishwatcher's Guide to Life, the Ocean and Everything. 2018, Bloomsbury Sigma, ISBN 978-1472936837.
- Octopuses. Alan Male (illus.). London: Ladybird Books. 21 March 2019. ISBN 978-0-7181-8909-9.
- The Brilliant Abyss. New York: Atlantic Monthly Press. 2021. ISBN 978-0-8021-5822-2.
- Scientists in the Wild Galápagos, 2023, Flying Eye Books, ISBN 9781838748593.
- What the Wild Sea Can Be: The Future of the World's Ocean. 2024. Atlantic Monthy, ISBN 9780802162991.
