= Amy-Jane Beer =

British nature writer

Amy-Jane Beer is a British naturalist, writer and campaigner. Her 2022 book The Flow: Rivers, Water and Wildness won the Wainwright Prize for Nature Writing.

== Early life and education ==
Beer has a BSc (1993) in biology and a PhD (1997) from Royal Holloway, University of London. Her doctoral thesis title was Postembryonic development and neurobiology of the sea urchin Psammechinus miliaris.

== Career ==
Her book The Flow: Rivers, Water and Wildness won the 2023 Wainwright Prize for Nature Writing. She writes for The Guardian's "Country Diary" column.

She is president of the Friends of the Dales, the society supporting the Yorkshire Dales.

She contributed to the People's Manifesto for Wildlife coordinated by Chris Packham, writing the section for the "Ministry of Social Inclusion and Access to Nature".

She is an enthusiastic kayaker and supports the campaign for free access to England's rivers.

She has been interviewed by David Oakes for his Trees A Crowd podcast.

== Personal life ==
Beer lives in North Yorkshire with her husband, her son, and her Border Collie dog.

== Selected publications ==
- Beer, Amy-Jane (2022). The Flow: Rivers, Water and Wildness. Bloomsbury. ISBN 9781472977397.
- Beer, Amy-Jane (2018). Pocket guide to turtles, snakes and other reptiles. Lincoln Children's Books. ISBN 9781786039101.
- Beer, Amy-Jane (2018). A tree a day : 365 of the world's most majestic trees. Chronicle Books. ISBN 9781849947411.
- Beer, Amy-Jane (2018). The A to Z of wildlife watching. Lonely Planet. ISBN 9781787014312.
- Morris, Pat; Beer, Amy-Jane (2010). "[Mammals section]". In Alexander, Becky (ed.). The Natural History Book : the ultimate visual guide to everything on Earth. Dorling Kindersley. ISBN 9781405336994.
