= Tweet of the Day =

British radio programme

- Genre: Factual
- Running time: 90 seconds
- Country of origin: United Kingdom
- Language: English
- Home station: BBC Radio 4
- Hosted by: Various BBC wildlife presenters
- Original release: 6 May 2013 – 2023
- No. of series: 3
- No. of episodes: 500
- Website: Tweet of the Day
- Podcast: Podcasts & Downloads

Tweet of the Day is a British radio programme that was broadcast on BBC Radio 4 on weekdays at 05:58 from Monday to Friday. The original format of an episode is a short programme of 90 seconds, the original series featuring the song or sounds of a British bird, visitor, or bird chorus and a few facts about each bird described by a BBC wildlife presenter.

The first episode was broadcast on 6 May 2013 and featured the song of the male common cuckoo presented by David Attenborough. The series won the Broadcasting Press Guild's award for radio programme of the year in 2014. The series was scheduled across a year, by the end of which 266 different bird sounds had been featured. The original series was repeated before Series Two.

A follow-up series Tweet of the Day: World Birds, featured a mix of worldwide and British bird species. A third series features very little birdsong, but instead features a guest describing the effect a particular species' calls has had on them personally. The current broadcasts are two-week batches of repeats.

In March 2024 it was announced that the series would cease to be broadcast from Mondays to Fridays, and would only be broadcast at 8: 57 a.m. on Sundays.

== Presenters ==
The original series was presented by David Attenborough, Miranda Krestovnikoff, Steve Backshall, Michaela Strachan, Brett Westwood, Bill Oddie, Chris Packham, John Aitchison, Kate Humble, Liz Bonnin and Martin Hughes-Games.

The second series included the above presenters, as well as Michael Palin and others

== Sound recordists ==
- Original series - Chris Watson, Gary Moore, Geoff Sample, and Simon Elliott.
- Second series - Recordings sourced from various audio libraries worldwide.
