= BBC Wildlife =

British magazine

- Cover of 60th anniversary issue (January 2023)
- Editor: Paul McGuinness
- Categories: Nature
- Frequency: Monthly
- Total circulation: 27,247 (January to December 2021)
- First issue: January 1963
- Company: Immediate Media Company
- Country: United Kingdom
- Based in: London
- Language: English
- Website: www.discoverwildlife.com
- ISSN: 0265-3656

BBC Wildlife is a British glossy, all-colour magazine about wildlife, operated and published by Our Media. It produces 13 issues a year.

BBC Wildlife was launched in January 1963 as Animals Magazine, edited by filmmaker Armand Denis. In 1974 the magazine was renamed Wildlife, and in November 1983 the magazine joined BBC Magazines as BBC Wildlife.

From 1981, and for 23 years, it was edited by Rosamund Kidman Cox. In May 2004, BBC Wildlife moved to Origin Publishing, which became Immediate Media Company, and Sophie Stafford took over the editorship after working as a section editor for two years. In 2013, Matt Swaine took over the reins, followed by Sheena Harvey in 2015. The current editor, Paul McGuinness, took over in May 2019 and the company changed to Our Media.

Content for the BBC Wildlife website is commissioned and managed by digital editor Debbie Graham.

Editions are now numbered such that the January 2005 edition was volume 23, number 1.

== Regular contributors ==
Regular columnists include:

- Mark Carwardine
- Nick Baker

Regular writers include:

- Chris Packham
- Amy-Jane Beer
- Tim Birkhead
- Helen Scales
- Stephen Moss
