= Number 9 Films =

British film production company

- Industry: Film
- Founded: 2002
- Founder: Elizabeth Karlsen; Stephen Woolley
- Headquarters: London, England, United Kingdom
- Products: Motion Pictures
- Website: number9films.co.uk

Number 9 Films is a British independent film production company co-founded in 2002 by producers Elizabeth Karlsen and Stephen Woolley, after a long collaboration at both Palace Pictures and Scala Productions.

Between them the principles' movies have garnered 57 BAFTA nominations and wins, and 23 Academy Award® nominations and wins.

Stephen Woolley and Elizabeth Karlsen were jointly honoured with the BAFTA Outstanding British Contribution to Cinema Award in 2019.

In 2019, Number 9 Films entered into a multi-year agreement with film studio and cinema chain Shochiku for distribution of its theatrical films in Japan. The studio would also contribute funding for film development.

In 2024, Beta Film took a stake in Number 9 TV, a new small screen subsidiary of the production company.

== Filmography ==
Year	Title	Worldwide box office	Notes
2004	Return to Sender		
2005	Mrs. Harris		Nominated for twelve Emmy Awards
2005	Stoned	$174,758	
2005	Breakfast on Pluto	$3.9 million	Nominated for 11 Irish Film & Television Academy awards.
2006	Sixty Six	$1.9 million	
2007	And When Did You Last See Your Father?	$2.7 million	Nominated for seven British Independent Film Awards
2008	Sounds Like Teen Spirit		
2008	How to Lose Friends & Alienate People	$19.2 million	Production budget: $28 million.
2009	Perrier's Bounty	$167,938	
2010	Made in Dagenham	$15.6 million	Production budget: £5 million. Nominated for four British Academy Film Awards; Nominated for four British Independent Film Awards
2012	Midnight's Children	$1.6 million	
2012	Byzantium	$92,544	Production budget: €8 million.
2012	Great Expectations	$920,099	
2014	Hyena	$89,526	
2015	Carol	$42.7 million	Production budget: $11.8 million. Nominated for nine British Academy Film Awards; Nominated for six Academy Awards; Nominated for five Golden Globe Awards
2015	Youth	$24 million	Nominated for two Golden Globe Awards; Nominated for one Academy Award
2016	The Limehouse Golem	$2.3 million	Released in 2017.
2016	Their Finest	$13.8 million	
2017	On Chesil Beach	$3.4 million	
2018	Colette	$16 million	Nominated for four British Independent Film Awards; Nominated for two Satellite Awards
2021	Mothering Sunday	$2.1 million	
2022	Living	$12.1 million	Nominated for nine British Independent Film Awards; Nominated for one Golden Globe Award; Nominated for three British Academy Film Awards; Nominated for four Satellite Awards; Nominated for two Academy Awards
2024	The Assessment		
2024	Another End		Co-executive producers Nominated for the Golden Bear at the 2024 Berlin Film Festival.
2024	The Salt Path		
2025	A Pale View of Hills		
