= The Salt Path (film) =

2024 British biographical drama film

- Theatrical release poster
- Directed by: Marianne Elliott
- Screenplay by: Rebecca Lenkiewicz
- Based on: The Salt Path by Raynor Winn
- Produced by: Elizabeth Karlsen; Stephen Woolley; Lloyd Levin; Beatriz Levin
- Starring: Gillian Anderson; Jason Isaacs
- Cinematography: Hélène Louvart
- Music by: Chris Roe
- Production companies: Number 9 Films; Elliott and Harper Productions; Shadowplay Features
- Distributed by: Black Bear UK
- Release dates: 5 September 2024 (TIFF); 30 May 2025 (United Kingdom)
- Running time: 115 minutes
- Country: United Kingdom
- Language: English
- Box office: $17.7 million

The Salt Path is a 2024 British biographical film directed by Marianne Elliott and written by Rebecca Lenkiewicz, based on the 2018 memoir by Raynor Winn. Gillian Anderson and Jason Isaacs star as Raynor and Moth Winn, a couple who walk the South West Coast Path after they become homeless and Moth is diagnosed with fatal corticobasal degeneration.

The Salt Path premiered in the Special Presentations section at the 2024 Toronto International Film Festival on 6 September 2024, and was released in the United Kingdom by Black Bear UK on 30 May 2025. It received mixed reviews. Elements of the narrative were disputed following a report published by The Observer in July 2025.

== Plot ==
Raynor Winn and her husband, Moth, who has been diagnosed with degenerative corticobasal degeneration, are evicted from their farm and home after investing in a friend's business venture, despite presenting evidence that could have prevented their eviction. Destitute and with their only source of income £40 weekly Working Tax Credit, they decide to walk the 1000km South West Coast Path, as detailed in Paddy Dillon's guidebook, The South West Coast Path. Beginning in Minehead, they trek around the coasts of Somerset, Devon, Cornwall, and Dorset to Poole, on the way coming to terms with the shame associated with homelessness and the scorn of some people they meet, while others offer sympathy and assistance. As they walk, Moth slowly grows in strength.

As winter draws in they meet Polly, who offers them to stay in her shed if they will renovate it for her. While spending winter there Polly arranges a job for Raynor helping shear sheep, which brings in money for the couple. Moth decides to study sustainable farming, with the aim of securing a student loan the couple can live on. The couple complete the walk and are offered accommodation by a stranger, while Moth finishes his studies and both worked in agriculture. Ray writes up her travel notes and publishes her book The Salt Path, which beomes a bestseller.

== Cast ==
- Gillian Anderson as Raynor Winn
- Jason Isaacs as Moth Winn
- James Lance as Grant
- Hermione Norris as Polly

== Production ==
In 2023, Gillian Anderson and Jason Isaacs were cast in an adaptation of the 2018 book The Salt Path. The film was directed by Marianne Elliott in her feature directorial debut, and written by Rebecca Lenkiewicz. The producers were Elizabeth Karlsen, Stephen Woolley, Lloyd Levin, and Beatriz Levin. The production company was Number 9 Films, with BBC Film and LipSync financing and Black Bear Pictures acquiring UK distribution rights. In July 2023, James Lance and Hermione Norris joined the cast.

Filming took place in Chepstow in Monmouthshire, and in Aust, Gloucestershire, in June 2023, and on East Head at West Wittering, West Sussex.

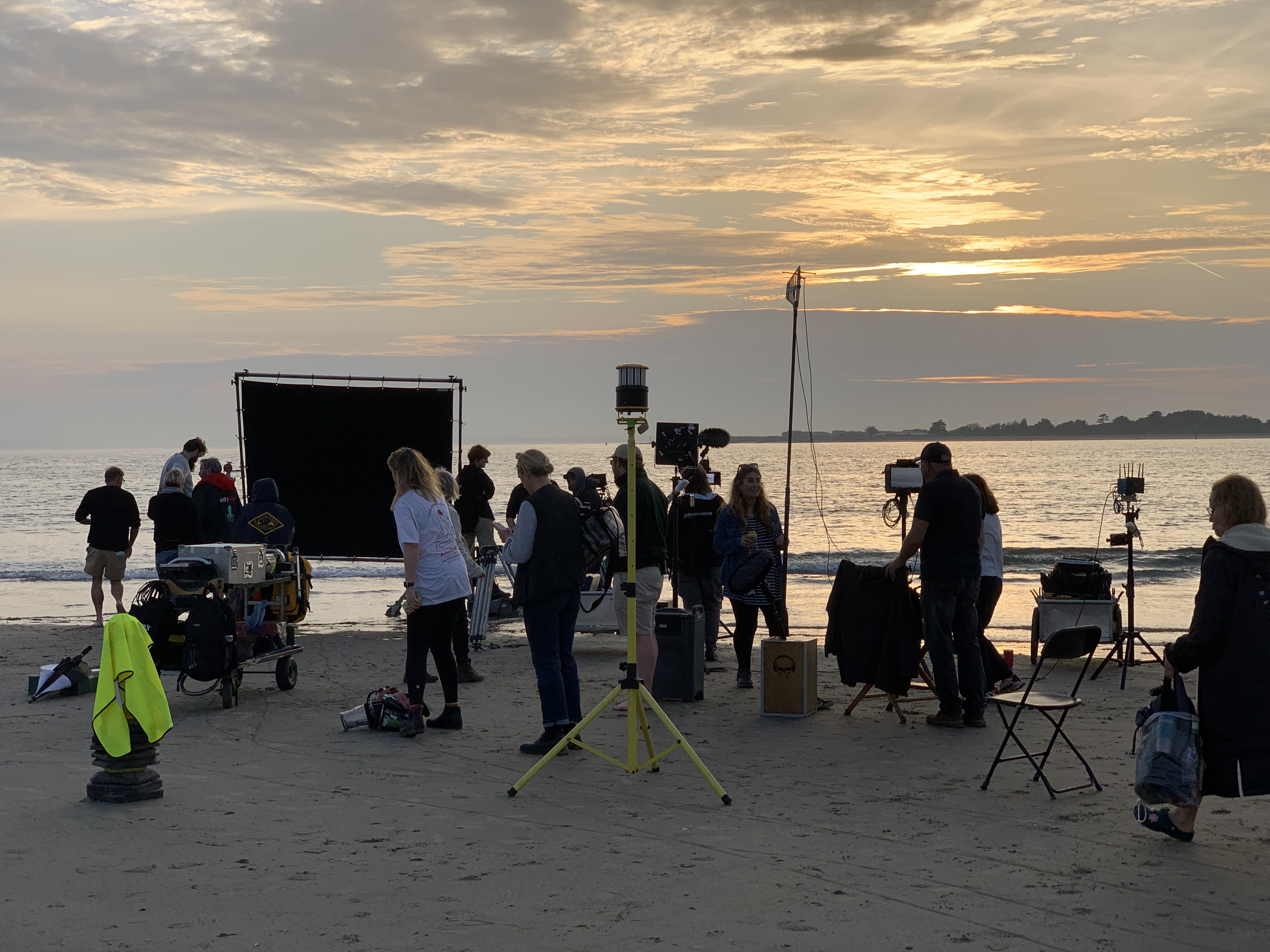
The Salt Path film set at East Head on West Wittering

Principal photography started in Somerset in July 2023; filming locations included Minehead and Porlock Weir in Somerset, Lynton to Heddon's Mouth, as well as Ilfracombe, Clovelly and Hartland Quay in Devon. Filming locations in Cornwall included Padstow, Fistral Beach, Port Quin, Holywell Bay, and Rame Head.

Raynor Winn said of the film that it had brought her "straight back" to the difficult emotions she had felt when evicted and her husband Moth had had his terminal diagnosis. She recalled the day that Gillian Anderson and Jason Isaacs had come to the door of her house, feeling "That's not what is supposed to happen to [an ordinary] girl from Melton Mowbray".

Anderson said she was surprised how defensive Raynor was, noting also the author's "steeliness". Anderson agreed that it must have been an experience to have famous actors arrive to play you. Conversely, Raynor commented that she had wondered how an actor as "perfect and glamorous" as Anderson could portray her in the rawness of her state on the walk.

== Release ==
The Salt Path had its world premiere as part of the Special Presentations lineup at the 2024 Toronto International Film Festival on 5 September 2024. The film had preview screenings in Australia from 4 May 2025, with its official release on 15 May. The UK release date was 30 May 2025. The film is scheduled to be released in United States on 22 May 2026.

== Reception ==
On Rotten Tomatoes, The Salt Path has a rating of 77% based on reviews from 43 critics, with an average rating of 6.4/10. The website's consensus reads: "Beautifully acted and infused with breathtaking landscapes, The Salt Path unfolds as a modest but moving portrait of loss and renewal." On Metacritic, it has a weighted average score of 49 based on reviews from four critics, indicating "mixed or average" reviews.

Clarisse Loughrey, in The Independent, writes that The Salt Path offers an "emotionally tidy" presentation of the chaos that major life shocks can bring. In her view, the "shame and exhaustion" of Ray, a woman whose lifelong security has been torn from her, is "etched on Anderson's face", and Anderson "studiously presents those emotions". Isaacs, too, she writes, takes great care to show Moth's feelings, alongside the shaking hands and stiffness of a man suffering from CBD. But that said, in Loughrey's view, the film fails to present the humanity of the couple, aside from their burdens. Nor does it show any of the deeper issues, like the "failed systems" (of law, of social security) that put them in this crisis. The result is "yet another pat story about how reconnecting with nature is good for the soul", cue Anderson listening to birdsong.

Tim Robey, writing in The Daily Telegraph, says that the film, Elliott's first after successful theatre productions like War Horse in London's West End, tackles "important points about homelessness" but that it is let down by the script. He calls the drama "modestly scaled", with a "genuinely funny" incident when people mistake Moth for the wandering poet laureate Simon Armitage, and invite him and Ray to their home, only to be horrified in a "pin-drop silence" when Ray tells them Moth isn't the poet. Robey finds Isaacs' performance "grittily believable" throughout, while Anderson shines as if "gazing out at her own ruin" in a play by Samuel Beckett. He admires the experienced Hélène Louvart's cinematography, but writes that however craggy the coastal rocks, Anderson's face reflects the warmth of the sun whenever it comes out.

Cath Clarke of The Guardian writes that "Elliott handles their story gently, with patience – though it might feel a bit slow for some." She finds the scene where Ray goes to a cash machine, not knowing if there will be enough money to live on for the week, an "edge-of-the-seat moment". She describes the film as intelligent and impressive, and the SouthWest Coast landscape "gorgeous". In her view, the film manages to give sincerity to familiar messages like living in each moment and having even a long-standing relationship grow unexpectedly.

== Disputed narrative ==
In July 2025, The Observer published a report disputing the facts of the Salt Path book. The report found that Winn had lost her home after stealing £64,000 from her employer, and cast doubt on Moth's diagnosis. Raynor denied the allegations. Anderson described the report as "really disappointing ... It felt like such a betrayal because we'd spent time with [the Winns]". Isaacs said the film was "beautiful" and that "much of it is still completely valid". According to Anderson, Sony Pictures Classics canceled a distribution deal for the film following the report.

In The AV Club, Kayleigh Donaldson wrote that "it seemed obvious now that The Salt Path's failures as a film were rooted in the deceit of its source material" and that it was "full of these little moments that now reek of phoniness". She found the implication that a 630-mile walk could heal Moth's terminal disease "genuinely objectionable ... The false hope the Winns peddled might be the most offensive part of this entire charade."
