= The Assessment =

2024 science fiction drama film

- Theatrical release poster
- Directed by: Fleur Fortuné
- Screenplay by: Dave Thomas; Nell Garfath-Cox; John Donnelly
- Produced by: Stephen Woolley; Elizabeth Karlsen; Jonas Katzenstein; Maximilian Leo; Shivani Rawat; Julie Goldstein; Grant S. Johnson
- Starring: Elizabeth Olsen; Alicia Vikander; Himesh Patel
- Cinematography: Magnus Nordenhof Jønck
- Edited by: Yorgos Lamprinos
- Music by: Emilie Levienaise-Farrouch
- Production companies: Number 9 Films; augenschein Filmproduktion; ShivHans Pictures; Project Infinity; Tiki Tane Pictures
- Distributed by: Capelight Pictures (Germany); Magnolia Pictures (United States); Amazon MGM Studios (International)
- Release dates: September 8, 2024 (TIFF); March 21, 2025 (United States)
- Running time: 114 minutes
- Countries: United Kingdom; Germany; United States
- Language: English
- Budget: $8 million
- Box office: $279,328

The Assessment is a 2024 science fiction thriller film. Set in a future where parenthood is strictly controlled, it follows a couple who undergo a rigorous seven-day assessment to determine their suitability for raising a child. The film stars Elizabeth Olsen, Alicia Vikander, and Himesh Patel, along with Indira Varma, Nicholas Pinnock, Charlotte Ritchie, Leah Harvey, and Minnie Driver. It was written by Dave Thomas, Nell Garfath-Cox and John Donnelly and directed by Fleur Fortuné in her feature-length debut. Its producers were Stephen Woolley, Elizabeth Karlsen and Grant S. Johnson with Number 9 Films, augenschein Filmproduktion, ShivHans Pictures, and Project Infinity.

The film premiered at the Toronto International Film Festival on September 8, 2024, and was released in the United States on March 21, 2025, by Magnolia Pictures.

== Plot ==
In the near future, society enforces strict regulations on parenthood due to environmental collapse and resource scarcity. Pharmaceutical cocktails that dramatically increase human life expectancy and healthspan also inhibit reproduction such that procreation is only possible through artificial wombs. Prospective parents must undergo a rigorous seven-day assessment to determine their suitability for raising a child. Mia and Aaryan, a married couple residing in a secluded, technologically advanced home beneath a protective dome, are eager to have a child. Mia is a dedicated botanist working on cultivating plant life, while Aaryan designs virtual reality pets to replace real animals that have been eradicated.

Their lives are disrupted by the arrival of Virginia, the government-appointed assessor. Virginia, a stoic and enigmatic figure, informs the couple that she will be living with them for the next seven days to evaluate their potential as parents. If they fail the assessment, they will never be parents. She initiates a series of unconventional tests, including adopting the persona of a child, exhibiting behaviors ranging from tantrums to inquisitive questioning, forcing Mia and Aaryan to respond as they would to their own offspring. These scenarios expose underlying insecurities and unresolved conflicts within their relationship, leading to emotional outbursts and moments of vulnerability.

As the assessment progresses, Virginia's methods become increasingly intrusive and manipulative. She orchestrates situations that put Mia and Aaryan against each other, further straining their relationship. One pivotal moment occurs when Virginia arranges a dinner party, inviting neighbors and colleagues to observe the couple's social interactions. The evening devolves into a series of awkward and revealing conversations, with guests challenging the couple's readiness for parenthood. This event highlights their differing coping mechanisms under social scrutiny and intensifies the existing tensions.

After Mia receives a call about her sister being sick in hospital, Virginia reluctantly agrees to let her go and see her as long as she returns by 6 in the morning. While Mia is gone, Virginia climbs into bed with Aaryan and pressures him into having sex, saying that it is a part of the assessment and will stay between them. When Mia comes back, it is revealed that the call from the hospital was a false alarm due to mix-up over names. The next day, Virginia burns down Mia's greenhouse and nearly dies in the process, but she is rescued by Mia.

At the end of the seven days, Virginia decides to fail them without any explanation. Aaryan admits to Mia about sleeping with Virginia. He creates a simulated baby to reconcile with her, which initially delights her but when she realizes the simulated baby has no smell, she abruptly drops it to the ground and refuses to accept it as their child.

Mia tracks down Virginia in a small, down at heel apartment and learns that there have been no successful applications in the last six years. Virginia had been offered the possibility of getting a child of her own to replace the daughter she had lost to a drowning accident in exchange for failing all couples. She explains the assessment was always meant to fail and was designed only to provide hope.

In the aftermath, Virginia is assigned to assess another couple but chooses to die by suicide. Fed up with the oppressive nature of the New World, Mia decides to leave the dome, seeking refuge in the Old World, a barren wasteland outside the dome, where her mother, a radical dissenter against the state's policies, was exiled. Meanwhile, Aaryan has created simulated versions of a child who is growing up and also a simulated version of Mia.

== Cast ==
- Elizabeth Olsen as Mia
- Alicia Vikander as Virginia
- Himesh Patel as Aaryan
- Minnie Driver as Evie
- Indira Varma as Ambika
- Nicholas Pinnock as Walter
- Charlotte Ritchie as Serena
- Leah Harvey as Holly
- Anaya Thorley as Amelia
- Benny O. Arthur as Ash
- Malaya Stern Takeda as Catherine

== Production ==
The Assessment was written by Mrs & Mr Thomas (Nell Garfath-Cox and Dave Thomas) and John Donnelly. It was directed by Fleur Fortuné in her feature length debut. It is produced by Stephen Woolley and Elizabeth Karlsen with Augenschein Filmproduktion and Number 9 Films.

Filming was expected to commence in Cologne, Germany in July 2023. In August 2023, location shooting took place in Tenerife. In February 2024, Deadline Hollywood reported that the film was in post-production.

== Release ==
The Assessment had its world premiere at the Toronto International Film Festival on September 8, 2024. That month, Amazon Prime Video bought the international rights outside Germany for the film. The film was released in the United States on March 21, 2025. The film was later released on Digital on April 8, 2025.

== Reception ==
On the review aggregator website Rotten Tomatoes, 83% of 77 critics' reviews are positive, with an average rating of 7/10. The website's consensus reads: "A stimulating sci-fi that invests its high concept into ideas rather than special effects, The Assessment puts a trio of superb performances under a microscope and invites the audience to join in the scrutiny." Metacritic, which uses a weighted average, assigned the film a score of 62 out of 100, based on 19 critics, indicating "generally favorable" reviews.

Vikander was nominated for Best Lead Performance at the British Independent Film Awards in November 2024. The film was also nominated for Best Debut Screenwriter and Jan Houllevigue for Best Production Design, winning the latter.
