= Downhill Racer =

1969 film by Michael Ritchie

- Theatrical release poster
- Directed by: Michael Ritchie
- Written by: James Salter; Roman Polanski
- Based on: The Downhill Racers; 1963 novel by Oakley Hall
- Produced by: Richard Gregson
- Starring: Robert Redford; Gene Hackman; Camilla Sparv
- Cinematography: Brian Probyn
- Edited by: Richard A. Harris
- Music by: Kenyon Hopkins
- Production company: Wildwood
- Distributed by: Paramount Pictures
- Release date: October 28, 1969 (Reno)
- Running time: 101 minutes
- Country: United States
- Language: English
- Budget: $1.8 million
- Box office: $1.9 million

Downhill Racer is a 1969 American sports drama film starring Robert Redford, Gene Hackman, and Camilla Sparv; it was the directorial debut of Michael Ritchie. Written by James Salter, based on Oakley Hall's 1963 novel The Downhill Racers, the film is about talented American downhill racer David Chappellet, who joins the U.S. Ski Team in Europe to compete in international skiing competitions.

Downhill Racer was filmed on location in Kitzbühel and St. Anton, Austria; Wengen, Switzerland; Megève and Grenoble, France; and Boulder and Idaho Springs, Colorado, United States. The film received positive reviews upon its theatrical release; Roger Ebert called it "the best movie ever made about sports—without really being about sports at all".

== Plot ==
American downhill skiers David Chappellet and D.K. Bryan are summoned to Wengen, Switzerland, by U.S. ski team coach Eugene Claire. The newcomers are there to replace Tommy Herb, a top skier who was recently injured during an FIS competition. Raised in the small town of Idaho Springs, Colorado, Chappellet is a loner focused only on becoming a skiing champion. After refusing to race at the Lauberhorn because of a late starting position, he makes his European skiing debut at the Arlberg-Kandahar in Austria, where he finishes fourth. In the final race of the season at the Hahnenkamm-Rennen in Kitzbühel, Austria, he crashes.

That summer, Chappellet joins the team in Oregon for offseason training. He visits his father at the family homestead, but they have little to say to one another. Chappellet drives into town and picks up Lena, an old flame, but after they have sex in the back seat of his father's old car, he shows little interest in her feelings. Later, when his father asks him why he is wasting his life on skiing, Chappellet reveals that he is racing as an amateur to become an Olympic champion. His father observes, "The world's full of 'em."

Back in France that winter, Chappellet wins the Grand Prix de Megève in France and attracts the attention of Machet, a ski manufacturer who wants him to use his skis to promote the brand, but Chappellet is more interested in Machet's attractive assistant Carole Stahl. After a chance encounter at a bakery, he and Carole spend some time together. They meet up again in Wengen, ski the slopes together, and have sex.

At Kitzbühel, Chappellet wins the Hahnenkamm, but his cockiness alienates his teammates and coach, who feel that he is only concerned about himself. Chappellet finishes the season with several victories, ensuring his place on next season's Olympic team.

At the start of the third season, David invites Carole to spend Christmas with him, but she doesn't come. He travels to Zurich to Machet's office to find her and learns that she is spending Christmas with her family. The next week, Chappellet sees Carole in Wengen with another man. After a brief confrontation, he realizes that their relationship is over.

Two weeks before the Olympics, Chappellet challenges top skier Jimmy Creech to a race from the summit to the bottom of the slope, as the coaches look on in horror. On the way down, Creech runs out of room on the trail and nearly collides with a stone wall. The next day, during the Lauberhorn race Creech is seriously injured, leaving Chappellet as the team's best hope for an Olympic gold medal.

At the Winter Olympics, Chappellet bests Austrian champion Max Meier, and is carried off in victory.

== Cast ==
- Robert Redford as Chappellet
- Gene Hackman as Claire
- Camilla Sparv as Carole
- Karl Michael Vogler as Machet
- Jim McMullan as Creech
- Kathleen Crowley as the reporter
- Dabney Coleman as Mayo
- Kenneth Kirk as D. K.
- Oren Stevens as Kipsmith
- Jerry Dexter as Engel
- Rip McManus as Devore

In addition, uncredited appearances include 1967–69 FIS Alpine Ski World Cup Swiss competitor Peter Rohr as one of the racers, and 1966 Silver Bear Grand Jury Prize-winning director Christian Doermer as the German skier who falls while challenging for the gold medal at the end of the film.

== Production ==
=== Development and writing ===
The screenplay for Downhill Racer is loosely based on Oakley Hall's 1963 novel The Downhill Racers. In February 1966, Paramount Pictures acquired the book's film rights from director Mark Robson for $15,000. The project was given to producer Steve Alexander and screenwriter Graham Ferguson. After attempts to develop it stalled, the new head of Paramount production, Robert Evans, used the property to entice director Roman Polanski, a skiing enthusiast, to make the film Rosemary's Baby for the studio. Although Robert Redford passed on Polanski's offer to star in both films, he soon attached himself to the skiing film, taking it on as a pet project. Redford also persuaded novelist James Salter to write a screenplay for the film, introducing him to Polanski and his partner, Gene Gutowski, who agreed to work on the film.

Salter prepared notes for the story, which did not resemble Hall's novel, as he had not even read the book. Salter's starting point for the story was provided by Polanski, who told him the film should be a modern-day High Noon, where the sheriff is killed and someone is called in to replace him. In the film, the lead U.S. national ski team racer breaks his leg, and David Chappellet is one of two skiers called in to replace him. Focused on directing Rosemary's Baby, Polanski soon left the project, and the studio sued Redford for walking away from the starring role. Redford later revived the project by pitching the story to Gulf+Western owner Charles Bluhdorn. Then Redford found his director and decided to make the film cheaply in Europe. Charles Bluhdorn, who was Austrian, may have influenced the film locations; he created the production company Wildwood.

In January 1968, Redford was named to produce and star and traveled with Salter to Grenoble, France, and accompanied the U. S. ski team— traveling on buses, sleeping in hallways, taking in the atmosphere, and observing the athletes. One night in Grenoble, they discussed the central character, David Chappellet. Salter's inspiration for Chappellet was the 1964 Olympic silver medal winner Billy Kidd of Vermont, who conveyed an "arrogant and aloof" quality. But Redford saw Chappellet as more like Spider Sabich, the dynamic skier from Kyburz, California, who finished fifth that year in the slalom. Chappellet ultimately took on aspects of both models, and Salter's original scenes of tense dynamics between Chappellet and the coach survived the writing process.

The original inspiration for the character is said to be Colorado's Buddy Werner of Steamboat Springs. Chappellet was said to be from Idaho Springs, Colorado. Werner burst upon the European downhill racing scene in the late 1950s and was the first American to win a F.I.S. downhill race. He was known for a reckless style but broke his leg in training two months before the 1960 Winter Olympics at Squaw Valley, in which he would have been a favorite for a medal in the downhill. Werner died in an avalanche in Switzerland in 1964, while performing for a film crew.

In late December 1968, Michael Ritchie signed on as director.

In 1969, Buck Holland and Jan Schimmel filed a $6 million lawsuit claiming that the film was based on their story Devil On His Hills, which they gave to Redford, and asking Paramount to stop saying the film was based on Hall's book. Before the lawsuit, Paramount had already deleted reference to Hall in advertising and on screen and sought an injunction against Hall interfering with distribution and claiming the film was based on his book. Despite Paramount's intention, some studio publicity was released crediting Hall. Hall filed a counterclaim against Paramount. Alexander was also in a legal dispute to gain executive producer credit.

=== Crew ===
Ritchie admired the work of British director Ken Loach and hired Brian Probyn and Kevin Sutton, the cameraman and soundman from Loach's film Poor Cow.

=== Filming ===
Three weeks before the film was due to begin, Paramount canceled it due to its $3.5 million budget; after the budget was reduced, filming proceeded. Downhill Racer was filmed on location in Wengen and Unterseen, Switzerland; Kitzbühel and St. Anton, Austria; Megève and Grenoble, France; and Boulder and Idaho Springs, Colorado, United States. Other scenes were shot at the Timp Haven ski area in Utah (acquired by Redford in 1968, now Sundance Resort). Most of the skiing footage was shot from January 11 to February 1, 1969, during four World Cup races: Internationales Lauberhorn in Wengen, Internationales Hahnenkamm-Rennen in Kitzbühel, Grand Prix de Megève, and Arlberg-Kandahar in St. Anton. The off-season scenes were filmed in Colorado: the track scene at Potts Field on the east campus of the University of Colorado in Boulder, and the hometown street scenes in Idaho Springs, thirty miles (50 km) west of Denver. The interior scenes of Chappellet's Idaho Springs house were filmed at Paramount Studios in southern California.

Sylvester Stallone, age 22, appears as an extra in the restaurant scene.

== Release ==
=== Theatrical ===
Downhill Racer premiered at the Granada Theatre in Reno, Nevada, on October 28, 1969. The film was released one month after Butch Cassidy and the Sundance Kid, also starring Redford. It was re-released in the U.S. in July 1984 at the Filmex (Los Angeles International Film Exposition) for a 50-hour Sports Movie Marathon on July 5–20. The British premiere was at Romaine Hart's Screen on the Green known as the "coolest cinema in London" and the audience included Richard Attenborough, Laurence Olivier, and Brian Forbes.

=== Home media ===
Downhill Racer was released on DVD in Region 2 format on August 13, 2007, by Paramount Home Entertainment. The Criterion Collection DVD was released on November 17, 2009.

== Reception ==
=== Critical response ===
In his contemporary review for the Chicago Sun-Times, Roger Ebert gave the film four out of four stars, calling it "the best movie ever made about sports—without really being about sports at all." In addition to praising the performances of Redford and Gene Hackman, Ebert noted how well the film balances exciting action sequences and the less glamorous aspects of an athlete's life. He wrote:

Without bothering to explain much of the technical aspect of skiing, Downhill Racer tells us more about the sport than we imagined a movie could. The joy of these action sequences is counterpointed by the daily life of the ski amateur. There are the anonymous hotel rooms, one after another, and the deadening continual contact with the team members, and the efforts of the coach ... to hold the team together and placate its financial backers in New York. And there is Chappellet's casual affair with a girl [...] who seems to be a sort of ski groupie. She wants to make love to him, and does, but he is so limited, so incapable of understanding her or anything beyond his own image, that she drops him. He never does quite understand why. The movie balances nicely between this level, and the exuberance of its outdoor location photography. And it does a skillful job of involving us in the competition without really being a movie about competition. In the end, Downhill Racer succeeds so well that instead of wondering whether the hero will win the Olympic race, we want to see what will happen to him if he does.

In his review for The New York Times, Roger Greenspun called Downhill Racer "a very good movie". Of the lead character, Greenspun wrote, "His world is that international society of the well-exercised inarticulate where the good is known as 'really great,' and the bad is signified by silence. In appreciating that world, its pathos, its narcissism, its tensions, and its sufficient moments of glory, Downhill Racer succeeds with sometimes chilling efficiency."

In his review for Life magazine, Richard Schickel praised the film for both its esthetic beauty and its depiction of the brutal realities of competition. Schickel wrote:

Downhill Racer is precisely what we have waited so long to see—a small, tense, expertly made (and, on occasion, surprisingly funny) film about a newly chic form of athletic competition—Alpine skiing. ... That insistence on the heart of the matter, winning or losing, is not the least of Downhill's virtues, but there are others. Quite obviously, they include capturing on color film the sheer beauty of the white world in which racers live. Here the director, Michael Ritchie, splendidly exploits a couple of paradoxes. From a distance, the skiers seem to have the effortless natural grace of birds in flight. Close up, though, he makes us see they are engaged in a brutal, breath-stealing ordeal, and the contrast gripped me as strongly as anything I have recently seen on the screen. Then there's the other paradox—that this agonizing effort takes place, unlike that of any other sport, with the competitor alone in a sea of silence.

On review aggregator Rotten Tomatoes, the film holds an approval rating of 82% based on 28 reviews. The website's critics consensus reads, "Downhill Racer plunges the viewer thrillingly into the action of the sport—and continues to hold the attention as a thoughtful drama." On Metacritic, the film has a weighted average score of 89 out of 100, based on 15 critics, indicating "universal acclaim".

=== Accolades ===
Award	Category	Nominee	Result
New York Film Critics Circle Awards, 1969	Best Actor	Robert Redford	Nominated
New York Film Critics Circle Awards, 1969	Best Supporting Actor	Gene Hackman	Nominated
Satellite Awards, 2009	Best DVD Extras		Nominated
Writers Guild of America Awards, 1970	Best Drama Written Directly for the Screen	James Salter	Nominated
