= Stephen Woolley =

English film producer (born 1956)

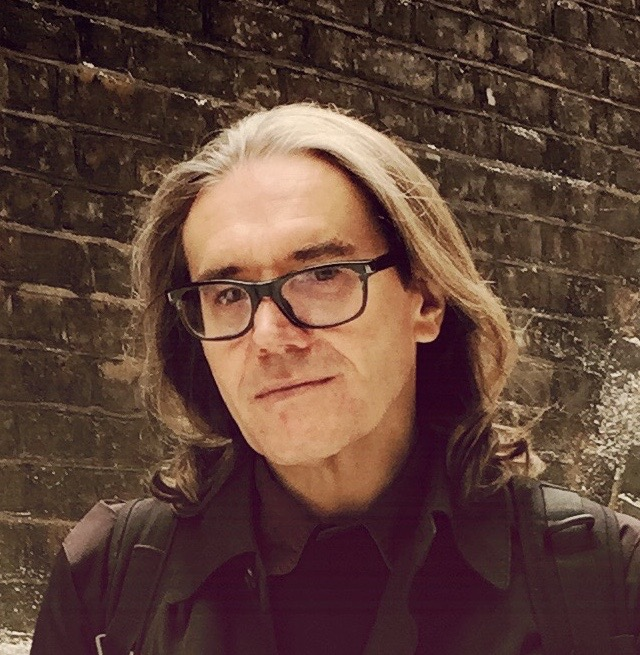
- Born: 3 September 1956 (age 70); London, England
- Occupations: Filmmaker and actor
- Years active: 1980–present
- Style: Comedy; Fantasy; Horror; Action
- Spouse: Elizabeth Karlsen

Stephen Woolley (born 3 September 1956) is an English filmmaker and actor. His career has spanned four decades, for which he was awarded the BAFTA award for Outstanding British Contribution to Cinema in February 2019. As a producer, he has been Oscar-nominated for The Crying Game (1992), and has produced multi-Academy Award nominated films including Mona Lisa (1986), Little Voice (1998), Michael Collins (1996), The End of the Affair (1999), Interview with the Vampire (1994), and Carol (2016). He runs the production company Number 9 Films with his partner Elizabeth Karlsen.

== Career ==
=== Early career ===
Woolley's first film as a producer was The Company of Wolves (1984), but his career began after leaving Dame Alice Owen's School in Islington, London. In 1976 he became an usher at the venue Quentin Tarantino described as “the coolest cinema in London”, The Screen on the Green in Islington, run by Romaine Hart (OBE), at a time when its ushers wore hotpants. He then joined the exhibition arm of film collective The Other Cinema in Charlotte Street in the West End of London, before going on to own and run his own repertory cinema, The Scala Cinema, on the same premises. As part of his programming, Woolley developed Friday evenings for special events which in March and May 1980 included early live gigs by the pop group Spandau Ballet, school pals from Dame Alice's, the second being filmed for London Weekend Television's youth series 20th-Century Box.

=== Palace Video and Palace Pictures ===
In 1981 under Woolley's management the Scala relocated to near King's Cross railway station. At the same time he established Palace Video in partnership with Nik Powell, in the early 1980s to distribute the types of cult cinema and international art films that had been the core of his cinema programmes. Palace Video titles included David Lynch's Eraserhead (1977), Derek Jarman's The Tempest (1979), and Werner Herzog's Fitzcarraldo (1982). It later grew into a theatrical distribution company, retitled Palace Pictures, where Woolley was behind the UK releases of French cult film Diva (1981), Sam Raimi's The Evil Dead (1981), Nagisa Ōshima's Merry Christmas, Mr. Lawrence (1983), Wim Wenders’ Paris, Texas (1984), the Coen brothers' Blood Simple (1984), Rob Reiner's When Harry Met Sally (1988) – as well as films by John Cassavetes, John Waters, Mike Leigh, Ken Loach, Peter Greenaway, Fassbinder, and Bertolucci. Palace Pictures moved into film production in 1984 with its first feature The Company of Wolves – directed by Neil Jordan (the first of many films Woolley and Jordan would later make together). Palace Pictures would eventually expand their operations, opening an office in Los Angeles by 1986. Many of Palace Pictures projects were first supported by Channel 4, and Woolley also helped establish many first-time directors including Michael Caton-Jones and Richard Stanley. In 1987, the company decided to set up making American-based films, starting with Shag, which was funded by Hemdale Film Corporation with a $4.6 million budget, as well as the first miniseries and its horror picture, which became the "firsts" for the entire Palace Pictures organization. Woolley established an association with Miramax, which distributed a number of Palace films in the United States, including Scandal (1989), A Rage in Harlem (1991), Hardware (1990) and The Crying Game (1992).

=== Scala Pictures and later career ===
Woolley had established his reputation with a series of low budget but high production value releases, but began developing more ambitious projects. After some box-office disappointments and the recession which weakened Nik Powell's parent company in 1992 Palace Pictures was forced to close. A year later, The Scala Cinema's twelve-year lease expired simultaneously as its defeat in a court case caused by an illegal screening of A Clockwork Orange, whose screening rights had been withdrawn in the UK by Stanley Kubrick in 1971, and the financial collapse of Palace precipitated its closure in 1993.

Woolley and Powell went on to found Scala Pictures, where they made Backbeat (1994), Little Voice (1998), Twenty Four Seven (1997), and a series of low budget UK features. Simultaneously, he secured a three-picture deal with Warner Brothers and made three films with Jordan after the worldwide box office hit of Interview with the Vampire. Woolley and Jordan formed a company, Company of Wolves funded by DreamWorks, where In Dreams (1999), The Actors (2003), Intermission (2003), and Not I (2000) were produced under this banner.

Number 9 films was set up in 2002, with longstanding producing partner Elizabeth Karlsen, whose films include Breakfast on Pluto (2005), How to Lose Friends and Alienate People (2008), Made in Dagenham (2010), Great Expectations (2012), Their Finest (2015) The Limehouse Golem (2016), and On Chesil Beach (2017).

Woolley's directorial debut, the 2005 film Stoned, was a biopic of Brian Jones.

== Personal life ==
Woolley is married to fellow film producer Elizabeth Karlsen, with whom he co-founded Number 9 Films in 2002. His niece, Synnøve Karlsen, is also an actress.

== Filmography ==
=== As filmmaker ===
- Mothering Sunday (2021)
- Colette (2018)
- On Chesil Beach (2017)
- The Limehouse Golem (2017)
- Their Finest (2016)
- Carol (2015)
- Hyena (2014)
- Great Expectations (2012)
- Byzantium (2012)
- Midnight's Children (2012) – co-producer
- Made in Dagenham (2010) – also second unit director
- Perrier's Bounty (2009)
- Freebird (2008)
- How to Lose Friends & Alienate People (2008)
- Sounds Like Teen Spirit (2008) – a documentary
- And When Did You Last See Your Father? (2007)
- Breakfast on Pluto (2005)
- Stoned (2005) – also director
- Intermission (2003)
- The Actors (2003)
- The Good Thief (2002)
- Not I (2000) – a short
- The End of the Affair (1999)
- In Dreams (1999)
- B. Monkey (1998)
- The Butcher Boy (1997)
- Welcome to Woop Woop (1997)
- Michael Collins (1996)
- Backbeat (1994)
- Interview with the Vampire (1994)
- The Crying Game (1992)
- The Pope Must Die (1991)
- A Rage in Harlem (1991)
- The Miracle (1991)
- Crossing the Line (1990)
- Shag (1989)
- Scandal (1989)
- High Spirits (1988)
- Absolute Beginners (1986)
- Mona Lisa (1986)
- The Company of Wolves (1984) – also executive producer
- The Worst of Hollywood (1983) – TV series
