= Landlines =

Landlines may refer to:

- The plural of landline
- Landlines, 2022 book by Raynor Winn
