= On Chesil Beach (film) =

2017 British film

- Theatrical release poster
- Directed by: Dominic Cooke
- Screenplay by: Ian McEwan
- Based on: On Chesil Beach by Ian McEwan
- Produced by: Elizabeth Karlsen; Stephen Woolley
- Starring: Saoirse Ronan; Billy Howle; Emily Watson; Anne-Marie Duff; Samuel West; Adrian Scarborough
- Cinematography: Sean Bobbitt
- Edited by: Nick Fenton
- Music by: Dan Jones
- Production companies: BBC Films; Rocket Science; Golan Films; Lipsync Productions; Number 9 Films
- Distributed by: Lionsgate
- Release dates: 7 September 2017 (TIFF); 18 May 2018 (United Kingdom)
- Running time: 110 minutes
- Country: United Kingdom
- Language: English
- Box office: $3.4 million

On Chesil Beach is a 2017 British drama film directed by Dominic Cooke (in his feature directorial debut) and written by Ian McEwan, who adapted his own 2007 Booker Prize-nominated novella of the same name. It stars Saoirse Ronan and Billy Howle and tells the story of virgins, Florence and Edward, and their first disastrous attempt at having sex on their wedding night. The initial experience and their differing responses to the failure have lifelong consequences for both.

The film had its world premiere in the Special Presentations section at the Toronto International Film Festival on 7 September 2017, and was released in the United States and United Kingdom in May 2018.

== Plot ==
In 1962, Edward Mayhew and Florence Ponting first meet after graduating from their respective universities. He is a historian at University College, London and a rock-and-roll lover; she is a classical violinist at Oxford with her own quartet. They fall in love quickly, meet each other's families, and eventually decide to marry, despite their different backgrounds and social status.

Florence is secretly anxious about the wedding due to her fears about sex, but there is no one with whom she can discuss it. On Edward and Florence's honeymoon at Chesil Beach, their backgrounds and temperaments come to the fore: Edward's quickness to anger and occasional physical belligerence, and Florence's unspoken relationship with her father, who obviously dominates her. They are both inexperienced sexually, and their first awkward attempt ends quickly and prematurely, and things get worse when Florence’s trauma of being molested by her father is triggered. She flees their hotel room and runs along the beach. Edward follows and angrily confronts her. Unable to say what is wrong, she tells him that although she loves him deeply and wants to be with him for life, she can only be a platonic wife and will not object to him going with other women. Edward angrily rejects the idea and the couple part ways. Ultimately, their marriage is annulled.

Thirteen years later, a young girl enters the record shop that Edward now runs. He realises that she is Florence's daughter, and afterwards painfully reminisces with his girlfriend and friends about his lost love. Much later, in 2007, Edward, still single, overhears on the radio that Florence's quartet – including her husband – will be giving a farewell concert after 45 years of professional success. He attends and sits in the third row, as he had once promised to do. When their eyes meet, he smiles, and both of them shed silent tears.

== Cast ==
- Saoirse Ronan as Florence Ponting
- Billy Howle as Edward Mayhew
- Emily Watson as Violet Ponting
- Anne-Marie Duff as Marjorie Mayhew
- Samuel West as Geoffrey Ponting
- Adrian Scarborough as Lionel Mayhew
- Bebe Cave as Ruth Ponting
- Anton Lesser as Reverend Woollett
- Mark Donald as Charles Morrell
- Tamara Lawrance as Molly
- Anna Burgess as Anne Mayhew
- Mia Burgess as Harriet Mayhew

== Production ==
=== Development ===
In 2010, Sam Mendes had signed on to direct the film with Focus Features developing. Carey Mulligan was in talks to star as Florence Ponting. Shooting was delayed when Mendes' Skyfall went into production and Focus Features pulled out of development. In 2011, the film went back in to pre-production, this time with Mike Newell directing and Sam Mendes producing through his Neal Street Productions banner with StudioCanal and BBC Films. Later, production ceased after pre-production over-ran and the producers got cold feet.

In February 2016, it was announced that Saoirse Ronan was to play Florence Ponting. Elizabeth Karlsen and Stephen Woolley produced the film under their Number 9 Films banner. In May 2016, during the Cannes Film Festival, it was announced that BBC Films would co-produce the film. In August 2016, Billy Howle joined the cast as the male lead. In October 2016, it was announced that Thorsten Schumacher's new film and TV outfit Rocket Science had come on board to complete international sales.

=== Filming ===
Principal photography began on 17 October 2016, on Chesil Beach, Dorset, England. Other filming locations included Oxford, Pinewood Studios in England and for the final concert,Wigmore Hall, London.

== Release ==
Lionsgate acquired the distribution rights for the United Kingdom in October 2016. On Chesil Beach had its world premiere at the Toronto International Film Festival on 7 September 2017. Bleecker Street acquired the U.S. distribution rights in October 2017.

On Chesil Beach was released in the UK on 18 May 2018. Originally scheduled for theatrical release in the United States on 15 June 2018, the date was pushed up to 18 May 2018.

== Critical response ==
On review aggregator website Rotten Tomatoes, the film holds an approval rating of 68% based on 170 reviews, and an average rating of 6.3/10. The website's critical consensus reads, "On Chesil Beach presents a well-acted and solidly crafted adaptation of a small yet resonant story with deceptively rich subtext." On Metacritic, the film has a weighted average score of 62 out of 100, based on 33 critics, indicating "generally favorable reviews".

The Economist praised McEwan's screenwriting for having "deviated from the source material in effective ways". Owen Gleiberman of Variety praised the cast and called the film a "romantic drama that gets so far into the mystique of its era that it takes you somewhere you’ve never been." Anya Jaremko-Greenwold of Flood Magazine wrote that "while men might fail to recognize how intimidating the expectation of sex can be for women, it’s something McEwan’s novel (and the film, for which he wrote the screenplay) hinges upon with exquisite delicacy."

Writing for IndieWire, Kate Erbland gave the film a grade of "C+," saying, "After a strong start, the film’s middle section sags into the most benign of observations about Edward and Florence and the elements that have pulled them together. For a film that is so consumed with the burning complications of first, early love, On Chesil Beach more resembles a wilted relationship, one that offers up no excitement about the future and little respect for the past."

Writing on Our Culture, Svetlana Sterlin noted the lack of explanation concerning how Florence apparently overcame her aversion to sex, so that shortly after the annulment of her marriage she had remarried and given birth to a daughter.
