= Byzantium (film) =

2012 film by Neil Jordan

- Theatrical release poster
- Directed by: Neil Jordan
- Screenplay by: Moira Buffini
- Based on: A Vampire Story by Moira Buffini
- Produced by: Sam Englebardt; William D. Johnson; Elizabeth Karlsen; Alan Moloney; Stephen Woolley
- Starring: Saoirse Ronan; Gemma Arterton; Sam Riley
- Cinematography: Sean Bobbitt
- Edited by: Tony Lawson
- Music by: Javier Navarrete
- Production companies: Demarest Films; Lipsync Productions; Number 9 Films; Parallel Film Productions; WestEnd Films
- Distributed by: StudioCanal (United Kingdom); IFC Films (United States)
- Release dates: 9 September 2012 (TIFF); 31 May 2013 (United Kingdom); 28 June 2013 (United States)
- Running time: 118 minutes
- Countries: Ireland; United Kingdom; United States
- Language: English
- Budget: €8 million
- Box office: $828,284

Byzantium is a 2012 Gothic horror film directed by Neil Jordan. The film stars Gemma Arterton, Saoirse Ronan, and Sam Riley.

Byzantium had its world premiere at the Toronto International Film Festival on 9 September 2012, and was released in the United Kingdom on 31 May 2013. The film received generally positive reviews who praised its direction, fresh approach to the vampire narrative and the lead performances of Arterton and Ronan.

== Plot ==
In 2010, an old man, Robert Fowlds, picks up a discarded note dropped by teenage vampire Eleanor Webb, who has taken to writing her life story and then throwing the individual pages to the wind. Realising what she is, the old man invites Eleanor to his house and tells her that he is ready for death. Eleanor proceeds to kill him and consume his blood. Elsewhere, Eleanor's mother, Clara, is chased from the lap-dancing club where she has been working. Werner, a member of the vampiric Brethren, demands to know where Eleanor is and captures her after an extended chase. Clara decapitates Werner, burns his body and leaves town with her daughter.

Eleanor and Clara seek sanctuary in a dilapidated coastal resort. There, Clara sets her sights on a lonely man named Noel, who has just inherited the Byzantium Hotel, a once-thriving business that has fallen into disrepair. Eleanor plays the piano in a restaurant and is approached by a young waiter from America named Frank, who takes a shine to her. Having seduced Noel, Clara turns the Byzantium into a makeshift brothel and Eleanor joins the local college which Frank also attends. Interested in her past, Frank questions Eleanor, who writes her story for him to read. Not entirely believing it, he shows it to their teacher, Kevin.

The story, revealed in a series of flashbacks over the course of the film, begins during the Napoleonic Wars, when a young Clara encounters two Royal Navy officers, Captain Ruthven and Midshipman Darvell. Much to the dismay of Darvell, Clara leaves with Ruthven, who forces her into prostitution after raping her. When Eleanor is born in 1804, Clara leaves her at a private orphanage. Years later, Clara is dying of what appears to be tuberculosis when the brothel is visited by Darvell, who has become a vampire. He gives Ruthven a map to an island where people can become vampires if they are willing to die. Clara shoots Ruthven in the leg, steals the map and makes her way to the island to become a vampire. Darvell finds Clara and takes her to the Brethren, a secret society of vampires that protects the secret of vampirism.

As their members have traditionally been male nobles, they are appalled that a low-born prostitute has joined their ranks but decide to spare her life, warning her that she must abide by their code but that she may play no part in their Brotherhood. Clara, alone and desperate after her banishment, secretly visits Eleanor at night. Shortly afterwards, Clara's decision to spare Ruthven comes back to haunt her, when the vengeful, syphilis-ridden Captain turns up at Eleanor's orphanage and drags her down to the basement to rape her. Clara brutally murders him but she is too late; Eleanor is condemned to a slow, painful death. Desperate to save her daughter's life, Clara takes Eleanor to the island and has her transformed into a vampire, violating the Brethren's code. The Brethren begin hunting Clara and Eleanor.

In the 21st century, Eleanor falls in love with Frank and decides to help him turn into a vampire so they can be together, since he is dying from leukaemia. Before killing him, Clara finds out from Kevin that Eleanor has told Frank of their past. Noel is accidentally killed, falling down the lift shaft, when Clara tries to prevent Eleanor from leaving the hotel and succeeds in trapping her in the lift. While Clara is out dealing with Frank, Darvell and Savella, the Brethren's leader, posing as police, find out from Kevin's colleague Morag where Clara is and go to kill her. Clara leaves without killing Frank when she realises that Eleanor is in mortal danger.

The Brethren kidnap Eleanor and drive her to an abandoned fairground to destroy her, only to be stopped by Clara. After killing Morag, Savella battles Clara and ultimately subdues her. Savella hands Darvell his sword, which he took from Byzantium during the Crusades, so he can kill Clara. Darvell, who has always harboured feelings for Clara, kills Savella instead. On the run again, Clara leaves with Darvell while Eleanor takes a weakened Frank to the island so he can become a vampire.

== Cast ==
- Saoirse Ronan as Eleanor Webb
- Gemma Arterton as Clara Webb
- Sam Riley as Midshipman Darvell
- Jonny Lee Miller as Captain Ruthven
- Daniel Mays as Noel
- Caleb Landry Jones as Frank
- Tom Hollander as Kevin
- Maria Doyle Kennedy as Morag
- Warren Brown as Gareth
- Thure Lindhardt as Werner
- Uri Gavriel as Savella
- Kate Ashfield as Gabi
- Barry Cassin as Robert Fowlds

== Release ==
The film premiered at the Irish Film Institute on 28 April 2013 with director Neil Jordan in attendance. It also received a red carpet screening in Hastings on 5 June 2013.

The film was shown at the Glasgow Film Festival in February 2013 with Neil Jordan, Saoirse Ronan, and Gemma Arterton in attendance.

The film was released in the United Kingdom on 31 May 2013, and received a limited release in North America on 28 June 2013.

== Reception ==
Byzantium received generally positive reviews from film critics. On the review aggregator website Rotten Tomatoes, the film holds an approval rating of 65% based on 118 reviews, with an average rating of 6.4/10. The website's critics consensus reads, "Director Neil Jordan remains as expert as ever when it comes to setting a chilling mood, but Byzantium struggles to match its creepily alluring atmosphere with a suitably compelling story." Metacritic gave the film a "generally favorable" score of 66 based on reviews from 22 sampled reviewers.

Critic Steven Boone, writing for Roger Ebert, wrote that, "the way screenwriter Moira Buffini [...] weaves threads of history, folklore, feminist spirit and universal themes is striking," praising also the camera work but finding fault with the amount of violence.

Philip French writing for The Guardian, found that "Byzantium is a complex film that combines a traditional gothic horror story (though not one that sticks to traditional vampire law), social history and a realistic account of dealing with authentic physical distress."

Both French and Boone were of the opinion that Byzantium compared favorably to director Neil Jordan's previous vampire film, Interview with the Vampire and to other popular vampire films, with Boone specifically mentioning the Twilight film series.

== See also ==
- 2012 in film
- Cinema of Ireland
