= Raynor Winn =

English author and long-distance walker (born 1962)

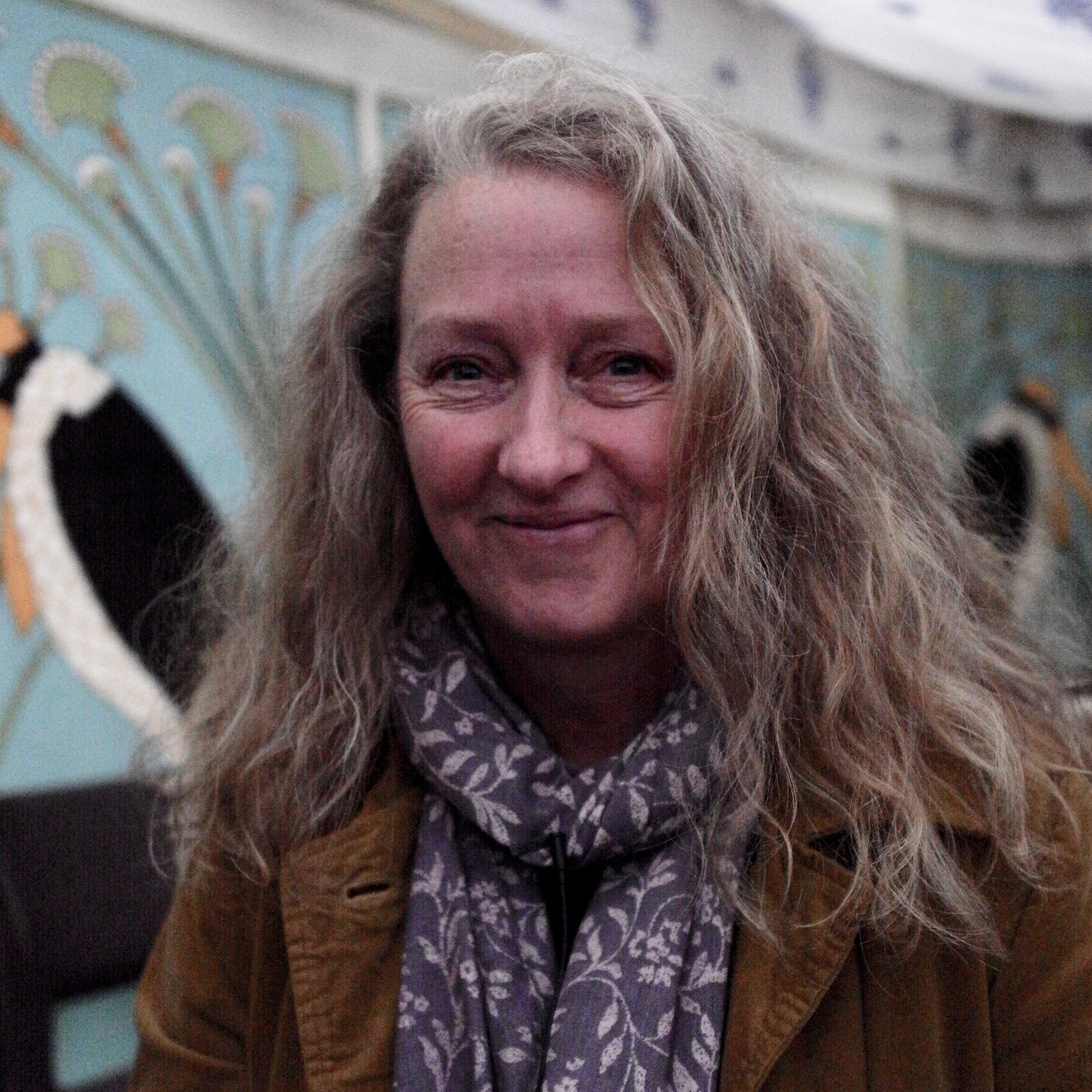
- Winn at the North Cornwall Book Festival, October 2019
- Born: Sally Ann Winn; 1962 (age 63–64)
- Occupations: Writer; long-distance walker
- Spouse(s): Timothy Walker, alias Moth Winn
- Writing career
- Language: English
- Notable work: The Salt Path

Raynor Winn (born Sally Ann Winn, 1962), also known as Sally Walker, is an English long-distance walker and writer. Her second book, the semi autobiographical memoir and travel diary titled The Salt Path, was a Sunday Times bestseller in 2018, and a film of the same name was released in May 2025 in the UK. In July 2025, a report in The Observer challenged the two events that led to the walk described in The Salt Path, namely her husband's terminal diagnosis of corticobasal degeneration (CBD) and the circumstances that led them to be evicted from their house in North Wales.

== Early life ==
Raynor Winn was born as Sally Ann Winn in 1962 in Melton Mowbray in the English Midlands. She grew up at Old Hall farm in the village of Dunstall near Burton upon Trent. She has stated that she was born Sally Ann Winn and that her married name is Sally Ann Walker, usually shortened to Sally Walker, but that she continued to occasionally use her maiden name, and chose it as part of her pen name; she disliked her given names and prefers to be called Raynor (or Ray) from her mother's maiden name Raynor, thus her pen name Raynor Winn; her husband is Timothy Walker and uses Moth as an abbreviation of Timothy. The couple have two adult children.

== Disputed events ==
According to the account in The Salt Path, two events in 2013 triggered the decision to walk the 630-mile (1,010 km) South West Coast Path. Moth was diagnosed with corticobasal degeneration (CBD); and the couple became homeless after a business deal with a friend went wrong.

According to a 2025 account in The Observer, the couple lost their home, which was near Pwllheli in Caernarfonshire in the north-west of Wales, after Winn stole £64,000 from her employer, where she was working as an accounts clerk. To repay this amount plus legal costs, the couple borrowed £100,000 from a distant relative with 18% interest per annum payable, secured against their house. In addition, they were both out of work, and had a £230,000 mortgage against the same property; the combined debts exceeded the value of the house. After the relative's business went bust, the debt was sold on, and the Winns, unable to repay, were taken to court. The Winns lost the case, and the house near Pwllheli was repossessed. As for Moth Walker's illness, the article said that "nine neurologists and researchers specialising in CBD" who were spoken to "were sceptical about the length of time he has had it, his lack of acute symptoms and his apparent ability to reverse them".

In response, in an online statement published on 9 July 2025, Winn called The Observer's article "grotesquely unfair" and "highly misleading" and stated that she was taking legal advice. Winn stated she was questioned but not charged, nor did she face criminal sanctions; a settlement was agreed by both parties. Winn claimed she settled because she did not have the evidence required to support what happened. Contesting The Observer's claims; she included copies of 3 letters written by Moth's doctors in 2015, 2019 and 2025. The earliest of these, which was 2 years after events described by Winn in The Salt Path, showed that Moth was "tentatively" diagnosed with a "mild form" of CBS. The BBC reported that one letter appeared to show that Moth had previously been considered as having an "atypical form of corticobasal degeneration", but further examination suggested he may have "an even more unusual disorder, perhaps monogenetic". Winn stated: "I never sought to offer medical advice in my books or suggest that walking might be some sort of miracle cure for CBS, I am simply charting Moth's own personal journey and battle with his illness, and what has helped him." A further article by BBC News corroborates much of the detail in The Observer article.

In the light of the allegations in The Observer, a charity dedicated to CBD and the related illness progressive supranuclear palsy (PSP), the PSP Association, ended its relationship with the Winn family. The two companies that produced the film adaptation, Number 9 Films and Shadowplay Features, stated that no issues were known at the time of filming, and that due diligence had been carried out.

Winn repeatedly claimed that The Salt Path was the first book she had ever written, although she had previously written and published one under the alias Izzy Wyn-Thomas. In 2019, Winn was awarded the £10,000 Christopher Bland Prize for debut writers after representing The Salt Path as her first book.

== Writing career ==
Winn's first book was How Not to Dal dy Dir, a novel, published in 2012 under the pseudonym Izzy Wyn-Thomas. This was self-published through the Winns' company, Gangani Publishing, and had a small print run. Some of the plot of the novel is similar to events in the non-fiction book The Salt Path as well as to facts uncovered by The Observer, with the female protagonist stealing tens of thousands of pounds from her employer, getting arrested, taking out a loan to pay back her employer, and ultimately losing her house when she fails to repay the loan.

Winn's second book, The Salt Path, marketed as a memoir, a piece of nature writing and a travel book, was shortlisted for the 2018 Wainwright Prize, and the 2018 Costa Book Awards in the biography category. The judges described it as "An absolutely brilliant story that needs to be told about the human capacity to endure and keep putting one foot in front of another." In May 2019, the book won the inaugural RSL Christopher Bland Prize. In September 2019, it was the bestseller in UK independent bookstores. A film adaptation also titled The Salt Path, with Gillian Anderson and Jason Isaacs in the lead roles, premiered at the 2024 Toronto International Film Festival on 6 September 2024 and was released in the UK on 30 May 2025.

Winn's subject matter includes nature, homelessness and wild camping. Her third book, The Wild Silence, was published by Michael Joseph in September 2020. It was shortlisted for the 2021 Wainwright Prize for Nature Writing. In 2020, the South West Coast Path appointed Winn a "charity ambassador", describing The Salt Path as "hugely popular" and "inspiring so many" to walk the path.

Winn's fourth book, Landlines (2022), describes a 1,000-mile (1,600 km) journey with her husband beginning with the 200-mile (320 km) Cape Wrath Trail in north-west Scotland, described as "the toughest and wildest Britain has to offer", and continuing southwards through Scotland and England to the South West Coast Path.

In April 2024, the couple set out to walk the Thames Path to raise awareness and funds for CBD.

Winn's fifth book, On Winter Hill, was to be published on 23 October 2025 (ISBN 9780241484586) by Penguin under the Michael Joseph imprint. It describes her solitary winter journey along the Coast to Coast Walk across northern England. On 11 July 2025, Penguin announced that together with Winn they had decided to delay publication. Penguin has since confirmed On Winter Hill will be released on 28 January 2028.

== Performance ==
Winn worked with Peter Knight's Gigspanner Big Band on a 2022 album Saltlines, with prose by Winn alongside traditional songs from the south west of England. They toured a Saltlines show in 2022 and 2024, and performed at the 2023 Sidmouth Folk Festival. The final few dates of a 2025 tour were cancelled after the Observer article was printed, although the band intended to fulfil some of the dates without Winn and with a different programme to promote their next album, Turnstone.
