= Stoned (film) =

- Promotional movie poster
- Directed by: Stephen Woolley
- Written by: Neal Purvis; Robert Wade
- Based on: Paint It Black by Geoffrey Giuliano Who Killed Christopher Robin? by Terry Rawlings The Murder of Brian Jones by Anna Wohlin
- Produced by: Finola Dwyer; Stephen Woolley
- Starring: Leo Gregory; Paddy Considine; David Morrissey; Ben Whishaw; Tuva Novotny; Amelia Warner; Monet Mazur
- Cinematography: John Mathieson
- Edited by: Sam Sneade
- Music by: David Arnold
- Production companies: Intandem Films; Audley Films; Number 9 Films; Finola Dwyer Productions; Scala Productions
- Distributed by: Vertigo Films
- Release dates: 18 October 2005 (Chicago International Film Festival); 18 November 2005 (United Kingdom)
- Running time: 102 minutes
- Country: United Kingdom
- Language: English
- Box office: $187,160

Stoned, also known as The Wild and Wycked World of Brian Jones in the United Kingdom, is a 2005 biographical film about Brian Jones, one of the founding members of the Rolling Stones. The film was directed by Stephen Woolley, and written by Neal Purvis and Robert Wade. Leo Gregory played the role of Brian Jones and Paddy Considine as Frank Thorogood.

== Plot ==
The film is a cinematic work of historical fiction, taking as its premise the idea that Jones was murdered by Frank Thorogood, a builder who had been hired to renovate and improve Jones's house Cotchford Farm in East Sussex, though there is a curious ghost-epilogue where Jones comes back to earth to thank chauffeur/minder Tom Keylock – not Thorogood – for making him into an immortal martyr. The film also paints a picture of Jones's use of alcohol and drugs, his estrangement from his bandmates, and his relationships with Anita Pallenberg and Anna Wohlin.

== Cast ==
- Leo Gregory as Brian Jones
- Paddy Considine as Frank Thorogood
- David Morrissey as Tom Keylock
- Ben Whishaw as Keith Richards
- Luke de Woolfson as Mick Jagger
- Ralph Brown as Brion Gysin
- Tuva Novotny as Anna Wohlin
- Amelia Warner as Janet
- Monet Mazur as Anita Pallenberg
- Ras Barker as The Lodger
- Gary Love as Jeff
- Guy Flanagan as Dino
- Will Adamsdale as Andrew Loog Oldham
- Josef Altin as Bill Wyman

== Reception ==
The film was poorly received by critics. On the review aggregator website Rotten Tomatoes, 16% of 51 critics' reviews are positive, with an average rating of 4.50/10. The website's consensus reads: "Poorly cast and sloppily assembled, Stoned turns one of rock 'n' roll's most darkly fascinating mysteries into a cinematic tragedy all its own." Metacritic, which uses a weighted average, assigned the film a score of 41 out of 100, based on 22 critics, indicating "mixed or average" reviews.
