= Mrs. Harris =

- Original poster
- Based on: Very Much a Lady by Shana Alexander
- Screenplay by: Phyllis Nagy
- Directed by: Phyllis Nagy
- Starring: Annette Bening; Ben Kingsley
- Music by: Alex Wurman
- Countries of origin: United States; United Kingdom
- Original language: English

Production
- Executive producers: Elizabeth Karlsen; Pam Koffler; Christine Vachon; John Wells
- Producer: Chrisann Verges
- Cinematography: Steven Poster
- Editors: Curtiss Clayton; Lee Percy
- Running time: 95 minutes
- Production companies: HBO Films; John Wells Productions; Killer Films; Number 9 Films

Original release
- Network: HBO
- Release: September 16, 2005

Mrs. Harris is a 2005 made-for-television drama film written and directed by Phyllis Nagy. The teleplay, based on the book Very Much a Lady by Shana Alexander, focuses on the tempestuous relationship between cardiologist and author Herman Tarnower and headmistress Jean Harris. Produced by Killer Films, Number 9 Films, and John Wells for HBO Films, Mrs. Harris premiered at the Toronto International Film Festival on September 16, 2005, before its broadcast on HBO on February 25, 2006.

The film stars Annette Bening as Jean Harris, Ben Kingsley as Herman Tarnower, Cloris Leachman as Tarnower's sister, and Chloë Sevigny as his secretary and lover. The film also features a cameo performance by Ellen Burstyn as one of Tarnower's previous girlfriends; Burstyn played Jean Harris in the made-for-television movie, The People vs. Jean Harris (1981).

== Plot ==
On a stormy night in March 1980, a distraught Jean Harris arrives at the baronial Purchase, New York home of Herman Tarnower following a five-hour drive from McLean, Virginia. Her goal is to commit suicide beside the pond on his estate after confronting her former lover, who spurned her in favor of his considerably younger secretary-receptionist Lynne Tryforos.

When Jean removes a gun from her handbag, Tarnower attempts to take it away from her, and in the struggle he is accidentally shot and collapses. Because the phone isn't working, Jean drives off to seek help from a neighbor, only to return to the house when she sees a police car heading in that direction.

The film then follows divergent paths, using flashbacks and flashforwards to tell the story of the couple's initial meeting, their evolving and eventually faltering relationship, the night of the shooting, and Jean's consequent trial for murder. A divorced mother of two sons, she tends to be complacent in both her personal and professional lives, the ideal target for Herman, a vulgar man with the need to be in total control of everyone and everything. He proposes marriage and presents Jean with a ring she feels is embarrassingly large and overly gaudy for the headmistress of a private girls' school. As time passes, she presses him to set a wedding date, until he finally confesses he has changed his mind about marrying her, primarily because he has no interest in playing the role of father to her sons. Jean attempts to return the ring, but he insists she keep it, and, instead of allowing her to make a clean break from the relationship, he continues to manipulate her by taking advantage of her need for a dominant presence in her life. By prescribing numerous medications to which she becomes addicted, he forces her to become both physically and emotionally dependent upon him while he flaunts his many affairs with other women.

During Jean's trial, a flashback to the night of the shooting shows it in a very different light from the earlier portrayal. An angry Jean willfully and methodically shoots Herman and coldly watches him writhe in pain, but on the witness stand she insists it was an accident. Her staunch refusal to allow attorney Joel Aurnou to portray her former lover in a bad light prevents him from presenting any details that would support a defense of extreme emotional disturbance. Consequently, she is found guilty and sentenced to 15 years to life in the Bedford Hills Correctional Facility in Westchester County.

== Cast ==
- Annette Bening as Jean Harris
- Ben Kingsley as Herman Tarnower
- Cloris Leachman as Pearl Schwartz
- Bill Smitrovich as Joel Arnou
- Chloë Sevigny as Lynne Tryforos
- Frances Fisher as Marge Jacobson
- Michael Gross as Leslie Jacobson
- Cristine Rose as Suzanne
- Mary McDonnell as Vivian Schulte
- Philip Baker Hall as Arthur Schulte
- Robert Cicchini as Detective Siciliano
- Michael Paul Chan as Dr. Louis Roh
- Ellen Burstyn as Former Tarnower Steady
- Nan Martin as Mama Tarnower
- Lisa Edelstein as Forensic Psychologist
- Brett Butler as Tarnower Ex #1
- Lee Garlington as Tarnower Ex #2
- Jessica Tuck as Wife #1
- John Rubinstein as Tarnower's Best Friend
- Larry Drake as Harris Defense Team Psychiatrist
- Heidemarie Fuentes as Crying Court Room Spectator
- Michael C. Moore as Jimmie Harris

== Production ==
Playwright and screenwriter Phyllis Nagy made her directorial debut on Mrs. Harris after executive producer Elizabeth Karlsen asked her who she thought should direct her screenplay. Nagy told Creative Screenwriting, "After I finished the first draft of that script, and Liz Karlsen brought me in to talk about directors, I knew she was going to ask me who I thought could direct this. I thought to myself, 'Well, I want to direct it.' But I didn’t say that. I came up with four names of people that I didn’t think would screw it up, and basically, she didn’t want any of them. And she said, 'Well, I think you should do it.' I thought, 'Oh! Yes, very smart woman, thank you.'"

This was the second television movie about the Harris murder trial, following The People vs. Jean Harris, which aired in 1981 shortly after the verdict was rendered. In the earlier film, Harris was portrayed by Ellen Burstyn, who makes a cameo appearance in Mrs. Harris as Gerda Stedman, one of Tarnower's many lovers. Her performance, which consists of two lines of dialogue totaling 38 words and lasts 14 seconds, was nominated for an Emmy Award for Outstanding Supporting Actress in a Miniseries or Movie. USA Today reported when asked about her reaction to the nomination by AP Radio, Burstyn responded, "I thought it was fabulous. My next ambition is to get nominated for seven seconds, and, ultimately, I want to be nominated for a picture in which I don't even appear."

== Critical reception ==
On review aggregator Metacritic, Mrs. Harris received a weighted average score of 70/100 based on 21 critics, indicating "generally favorable reviews". Dennis Harvey of Variety called the film "competent rather than inspired" and an "uneven affair", adding that the film "doesn't seem sure just what approach to settle on: Elements of mystery, social satire (Nagy does have some bright lines up her sleeve), psychological horror story, black comedy, and straightforward tragic love story all jostle without complementing each other or achieving a successful kaleidoscope effect ... Nevertheless, tale and execution are both colorful enough to hold attention."

== Awards and nominations ==
Year	Award	Category	Nominee(s)	Result	Ref.
2006	Artios Awards	Outstanding Achievement in Casting – TV Movie of the Week	Junie Lowry Johnson	Won	
2006	Online Film & Television Association Awards	Best Motion Picture Made for Television		Nominated	
2006	Online Film & Television Association Awards	Best Actor in a Motion Picture or Miniseries	Ben Kingsley	Nominated	
2006	Online Film & Television Association Awards	Best Actress in a Motion Picture or Miniseries	Annette Bening	Nominated	
2006	Online Film & Television Association Awards	Best Supporting Actress in a Motion Picture or Miniseries	Frances Fisher	Nominated	
2006	Online Film & Television Association Awards	Best Supporting Actress in a Motion Picture or Miniseries	Cloris Leachman	Won (Note: Tied with Anna Maxwell Martin for Bleak House.)	
2006	Online Film & Television Association Awards	Best Direction of a Motion Picture or Miniseries	Phyllis Nagy	Nominated	
2006	Online Film & Television Association Awards	Best Writing of a Motion Picture or Miniseries	Phyllis Nagy	Nominated	
2006	Online Film & Television Association Awards	Best Ensemble in a Motion Picture or Miniseries		Nominated	
2006	Primetime Emmy Awards	Outstanding Television Movie	Elizabeth Karlsen, Pamela Koffler, Christine Vachon, Chrisann Verges, and John Wells	Nominated	
2006	Primetime Emmy Awards	Outstanding Lead Actor in a Miniseries or a Movie	Ben Kingsley	Nominated	
2006	Primetime Emmy Awards	Outstanding Lead Actress in a Miniseries or a Movie	Annette Bening	Nominated	
2006	Primetime Emmy Awards	Outstanding Supporting Actress in a Miniseries or a Movie	Ellen Burstyn	Nominated	
2006	Primetime Emmy Awards	Outstanding Supporting Actress in a Miniseries or a Movie	Cloris Leachman	Nominated	
2006	Primetime Emmy Awards	Outstanding Directing for a Miniseries or Movie	Phyllis Nagy	Nominated	
2006	Primetime Emmy Awards	Outstanding Writing for a Miniseries or Movie	Phyllis Nagy	Nominated	
2006	Primetime Emmy Awards	Outstanding Casting for a Miniseries or Movie	Libby Goldstein and Junie Lowry Johnson	Nominated	
2006	Primetime Emmy Awards	Outstanding Cinematography for a Miniseries or Movie	Steven Poster	Nominated	
2006	Primetime Emmy Awards	Outstanding Costumes for a Miniseries, Movie or Special	Elaine Ramires and Julie Weiss	Nominated	
2006	Primetime Emmy Awards	Outstanding Hairstyling for a Miniseries or Movie	Elle Elliott, Bunny Parker, and Susan Schuler	Nominated	
2006	Primetime Emmy Awards	Outstanding Makeup (Non-Prosthetic)	Michele Baylis, Julie Hewett, Tina Roesler Kerwin, and Elisa Marsh	Nominated	
2006	Satellite Awards	Best Television Film		Nominated	
2006	Satellite Awards	Best Actor – Miniseries or Television Film	Ben Kingsley	Nominated	
2006	Satellite Awards	Best Actress – Miniseries or Television Film	Annette Bening	Nominated	
2006	Women's Image Network Awards	Outstanding Made for Television Movie/Mini-Series		Won	
2006	Women's Image Network Awards	Outstanding Film or Show Directed by a Woman	Phyllis Nagy	Won	
2007	American Cinema Editors Awards	Best Edited Miniseries or Motion Picture for Non-Commercial Television	Curtiss Clayton and Lee Percy	Nominated	
2007	Costume Designers Guild Awards	Outstanding Made for Television Movie or Miniseries	Julie Weiss	Nominated	
2007	Golden Globe Awards	Best Miniseries or Television Film		Nominated	
2007	Golden Globe Awards	Best Actor – Miniseries or Television Film	Ben Kingsley	Nominated	
2007	Golden Globe Awards	Best Actress – Miniseries or Television Film	Annette Bening	Nominated	
2007	Gracie Awards	Outstanding Director – Entertainment	Phyllis Nagy	Won	
2007	Producers Guild of America Awards	David L. Wolper Award for Outstanding Producer of Long-Form Television	Elizabeth Karlsen, Pamela Koffler, and Christine Vachon	Nominated	
2007	Screen Actors Guild Awards	Outstanding Performance by a Female Actor in a Miniseries or Television Movie	Annette Bening	Nominated	
2007	Screen Actors Guild Awards	Outstanding Performance by a Female Actor in a Miniseries or Television Movie	Cloris Leachman	Nominated	

== DVD release ==
HBO Home Video released the film in anamorphic widescreen format on DVD on August 1, 2006. It was re-released in September 2012. It features audio tracks in English and Spanish and subtitles in English, Spanish, and French. Bonus features include commentary by Annette Bening, Ben Kingsley, and writer-director Phyllis Nagy, and Mrs. Harris For the Record: Firsthand Accounts, which includes brief interviews with some of the real-life principals involved in the story, including Jean Harris.
