= The Salt Path =

2018 memoir by Raynor Winn

- Author: Raynor Winn
- Cover artist: Angela Harding
- Language: English
- Genre: Memoir, travel, nature writing
- Publisher: Penguin Books
- Publication date: 2018
- Publication place: England
- Pages: 274
- Awards: RSL Christopher Bland Prize
- ISBN: 978-1-405-93718-4
- Followed by: The Wild Silence

The Salt Path is a 2018 memoir by Raynor Winn. It details a long-distance walk along the South West Coast Path in England, which Winn claims to have taken with her husband, Moth, after he was diagnosed with fatal corticobasal degeneration (CBD) and they lost their home.

The Salt Path was translated into 25 languages and had sold two million copies by May 2026. It was shortlisted for the 2018 Wainwright Prize and the Costa Book Awards, and won the 2019 RSL Christopher Bland Prize. It was followed by the sequels The Wild Silence (2020) and Landlines (2022). A film adaptation starring Gillian Anderson and Jason Isaacs premiered in 2024.

A report published by The Observer in July 2025 alleged that many parts of The Salt Path were fabricated, finding that Winn had lost her home after stealing £64,000 from her employer, and cast doubt on Moth's diagnosis. Raynor denied the allegations.

== Summary ==
Raynor Winn (Ray) and her husband Moth, who is diagnosed with corticobasal degeneration (CBD), lose their farm in North Wales after investing in a company owned by a friend. When the company fails, leaving unpaid debts, the friend insisted they were liable for payment and took them to court. Unfamiliar with court processes and unable to afford a lawyer, Raynor and Moth lost the case.

Homeless and penniless, and with their weekly tax credits as their only source of income, Ray and Moth decide to walk the 630-mile (1,010 km) South West Coast Path. They take sleeping bags, a tent, waterproofs, instant noodles and a small amount of money. On the first night, on the edge of Exmoor, they take half an hour to put up the tent. The next day, aching all over, Ray develops an enormous blister and they treat themselves to the only cream tea on the trip. Another day, desperate for cash, they try to find a cash machine in a village. Moth is mistaken for the poet laureate, Simon Armitage, who is also walking the path, and treated with humour when he denies it.

Gradually, Ray and Moth learn to cope with the vagaries of long-distance walking, with its weather, people, landscapes, and wildlife. The exercise helps with Moth's symptoms. On a campsite, a ragged bearded man gives them something to smoke that fills them with relaxed bliss. Walking past the outdoor Minack Theatre, and surprised by the crowds, they are given tickets by a couple in a Land Rover.

After the first section of the walk, Ray takes a job wrapping sheep fleeces, something she had done on a small scale on her farm. She finishes the intense first day's work covered in lanolin from the wool, her arms aching, and gets up at 5:30 am the next day to do the same. On the last day, after walking the whole path in two sections, in two successive summers, a stranger offers them tenancy of a flat at Polruan.

== Route ==
Moth and Ray Winn walked westwards from Minehead, Somerset, via Exmoor and the north coasts of the counties of Devon and Cornwall to Land's End. From there they walked eastwards along the south coasts of Cornwall and Devon but stopped with her sister. The following year they started at the end point (Poole in Dorset) and walked westwards back to Polruan where they completed the walk.

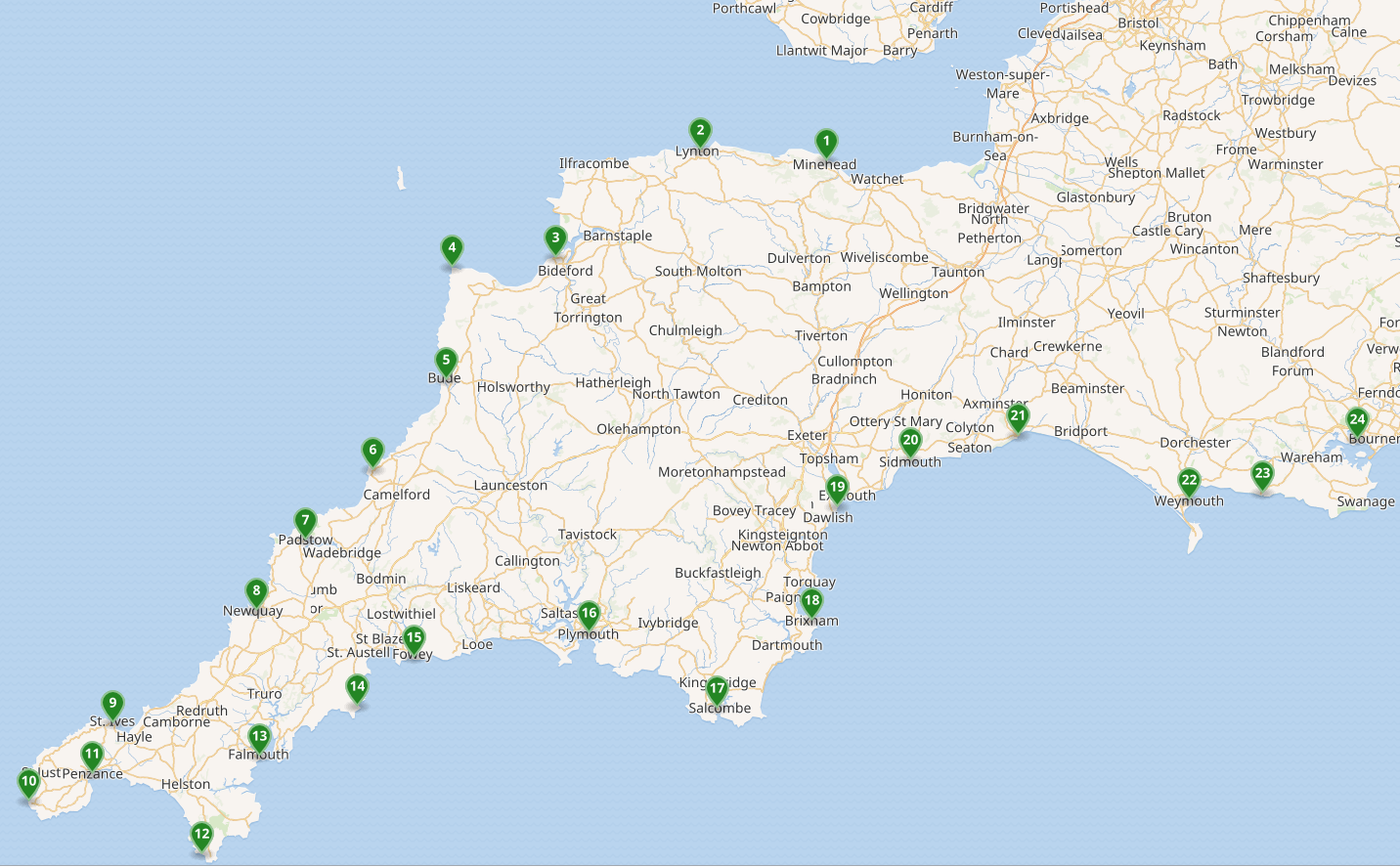
Map of Moth and Ray Winn's journey along the South West Coast Path

1	Minehead
2	Combe Martin
3	Westward Ho!
4	Hartland
5	Bude
6	Tintagel
7	Padstow
8	Newquay

9	St Ives
10	Land's End
11	Penzance
12	Kynance Cove
13	Falmouth
14	Gorran Haven
15	Polruan
16	Plymouth

17	Salcombe
18	Brixham
19	Dawlish Warren
20	Sidmouth
21	Lyme Regis
22	Weymouth
23	Lulworth
24	Poole

== Publication ==
The Salt Path was published in hardback by Michael Joseph in 2018 and in paperback by Penguin Books in 2019. It has original cover artwork (Cornish Path) in woodcut style by the printmaker Angela Harding. Harding told the NHBS (formerly the Natural History Book Service) conservation group that the artwork was based on her experience walking the South West Coast Path and camping in Cornwall. The text is accompanied by an outline map of the South West Coast Path showing the main towns along the route. The Salt Path was translated into 25 languages and had sold two million copies by May 2026. It was a Sunday Times bestseller in 2018. In September 2019 it was the highest-selling book in UK independent book shops.

== Reception ==
In The Guardian, Sam Wollaston wrote that The Salt Path is "funny, sometimes uplifting", covering the boundary between life and death. Another Guardian critic, P. D. Smith, found it "wonderfully uplifting and touching" and full of "wry humour". Kirkus Reviews notes "Many people's uncharitable reactions to their homeless state—one would think they were lepers"; but that there were equally often "unexpected gestures of generosity". It comments that Winn's prose is at the outset "mercurial", taking time to "settle down and achieve simplicity and clarity of observation". The review expresses doubt about the credibility of some of the "vignettes" describing coastal nature and "the enchantment of moments in the wild", but suggests that these will be forgotten as the reader comes to "admire the couple's fortitude and resiliency."

Canon Mike D. Williams of Exeter Cathedral writes that the book is made by the quality of its writing, and the stories of the people that Ray and Moth meet: "Those who treat them as tramps, those that show kindness and generosity." He notes how Moth several times shares his "meagre rations" with other hungry and homeless wanderers. The book is, he writes, about the coast path and its people, but its central theme is "the courage, resilience and grit of two people who, out of love for each other, keep putting one foot in front of the other."

The neurologist Rhys Davies, in Advances in Clinical Neuroscience and Rehabilitation, comments that the journal did not often review bestselling books, "still less travel books", but adds that The Salt Path has "a neurological twist", given Moth's diagnosis of corticobasal degeneration. Mentioning the value of laughter as "the best medicine", he describes the core theme of the book as a demonstration of "the indomitable human spirit". He finds the Winns presented a "compelling (if not scientifically irrefutable) case for the benefits of positive action and of physical therapy, even for the ghastliest of neurodegenerative conditions." He recommends the book as a "feel good" read for clinicians, and its positivity as being potentially beneficial for patients diagnosed with terminal neurodegenerative conditions.

Deborah Sharman, a social work educator at the University of Wolverhampton, contrasts Winn's autobiographical account of homelessness with the work of Adam Burley, a clinical psychologist who focuses on homelessness in Scotland. Sharman remarks the Winns' social situation and their determination to avoid dependence on friends or "the system". Sharman compares this choice to be independent to the relational approach to providing care by Burley. She states that he argues that the health care system itself appears "'phobic' about developing dependency, actively striving to make people independent and in so doing continues their isolation and inability to function."

The Salt Path was shortlisted for the 2018 Wainwright Prize and the 2018 Costa Book Awards in the biography category. The Costa judges described it as "an absolutely brilliant story that needs to be told about the human capacity to endure and keep putting one foot in front of another". In May 2019 The Salt Path won the inaugural RSL Christopher Bland Prize, an annual award of £10,000 for debut writers.

== Sequels and film ==
The Salt Path was followed by The Wild Silence (2020), which recounts the Winns' process of rewilding a farm in Cornwall, and Landlines (2022), describing their walk from Cape Wrath to Cornwall. In 2024, BBC News reported the Winns' intention to walk the 185-mile Thames Path to raise awareness about corticobasal degeneration. A film adaptation starring Gillian Anderson and Jason Isaacs premiered at the 2024 Toronto International Film Festival on 6 September 2024. It was released in the UK on 30 May 2025. A fourth book, On Winter Hill, is due for publication in October 2026.

== Disputed narrative ==
In July 2025, a report by Chloe Hadjimatheou for The Observer alleged some parts of The Salt Path were fabricated. Ros Hemmings, the wife of Winn's former employer, said that Winn, whose name at that time was Sally Walker, had embezzled money from the Hemmings family company, run by her husband. Winn borrowed money from a distant relative, partly to repay the Hemmings' company. The loan was secured against her house. The loan was later transferred by the relative to a third party and she was sued for repayment. In addition, Winn had a mortgage against the house; the loan and the mortgage together were worth more than the house, and it was repossessed. Hadjimatheou reported that the new owner of the Winns' house had received debt collection letters and bills "addressed to Sally and Tim Walker".

Hadjimatheou spoke to nine neurologists and CBD researchers, who expressed scepticism about how long Moth had had CBD, his lack of acute symptoms, and the apparent reversal of the symptoms.

On July 7, Winn said that the Observer report was "highly misleading" and that she was taking legal advice. Penguin Books said it had carried out "all the necessary due diligence" before publishing. On 9 July, Winn issued a statement in which she contested The Observer's claims; she included copies of letters from Moth's doctors. Further articles in the Observer alleged that parts of the book misrepresented some of the people whom Winn met, and cast doubt on the veracity of her account. Winn responded via her lawyers that she stood by her "honest account". Though Winn said The Salt Path was the first thing she had written since she was a teenager, and won the Christopher Bland prize for debut writers, her lawyer confirmed that she had previously self-published a book, How Not to Dal Dy Dir, in 2012 under the alias Izzy Wyn-Thomas.

After the Observer report, other newspapers and journals discussed the book and the wider question of truth in memoirs. BBC News corroborated much of the Observer report. Amelia Fairney, a former communications director at Penguin Books, argued in The Observer that publishing often favours profit over truth, and compared Winn to the American author James Frey, whose 2003 memoir A Million Little Pieces was extensively fabricated. A documentary film, The Salt Path Scandal, hosted by Hadjimatheou and based on her Observer investigation, was broadcast on 15 December 2025 on Sky Documentaries. The publication of Winn's fourth book, On Winter Hill, was delayed by a year following the scandal.

== Bibliography ==
- Winn, Raynor (2018). The Salt Path. Michael Joseph. ISBN 978-0-2413-4964-9.
- Winn, Raynor (2019). The Salt Path. Penguin Books. ISBN 978-1-405-93718-4.
