= Roy Field =

British special effects artist

- Born: 19 August 1932
- Died: 23 May 2002 (aged 69)

Roy Field (19 August 1932 – 23 May 2002) was a British special effects artist in the film industry. He worked on the first seven James Bond films before joining the team of 1978's Superman. He experimented with using animation to depict the flight of Superman and also used optical printing techniques to depict bullets bouncing off his body. The team shared the 1978 Academy Award for Best Visual Effects and the 1978 Michael Balcon award for Outstanding British Contribution to Cinema. Field received two BAFTA nominations for visual effects on the Jim Henson films The Dark Crystal (1982) and Labyrinth (1986).

== Earlier works ==
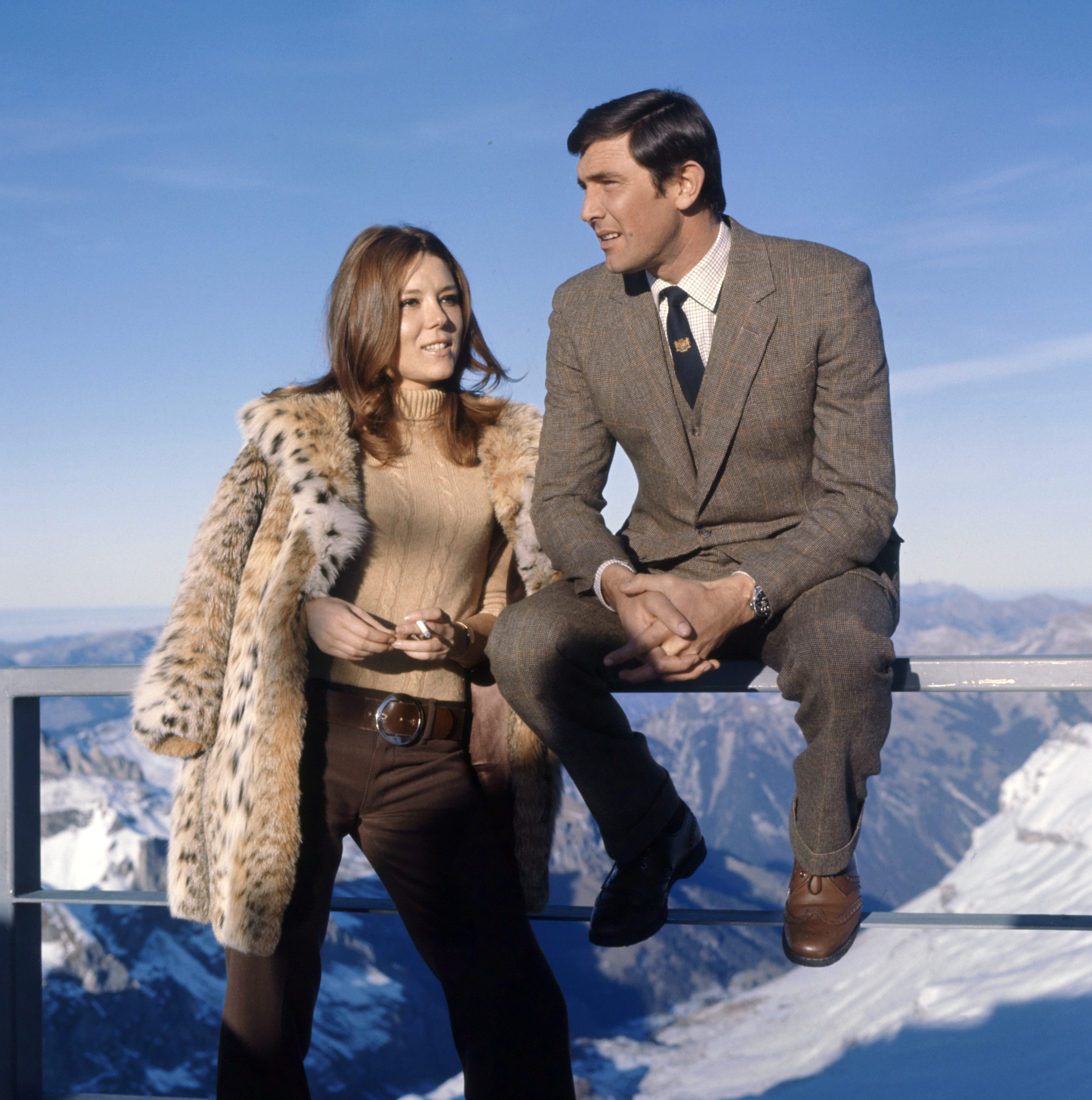
Lead actors George Lazenby and Diana Rigg on the set of On Her Majesty's Secret Service

Field was born on 19 August 1932 and was British. As a visual effects artist he worked on seven successive James Bond films for Eon Productions, starting with the first Dr. No (1962) and continuing with From Russia with Love (1963), Goldfinger (1964), Thunderball (1965), You Only Live Twice (1967), On Her Majesty's Secret Service (1969) and Diamonds Are Forever (1971). He later returned for an eighth film (he missed 1973's Live and Let Die): The Man with the Golden Gun (1974). Field also worked on Those Magnificent Men in Their Flying Machines (1965), Chitty Chitty Bang Bang (1968) and The Omen (1976).

== Superman ==
Field was part of the special effects team for Superman (1978). The team under supervisors Les Bowie and Derek Meddings included Colin Chilvers, Denys Coop and Zoran Perisic. The size of the team reflected the difficulty in depicting realistic flying sequences for the title character. At one stage Field trialled the use of animation for this purpose but rejected it as not being photo-realistic enough. Another of Field's contributions to the film was to use optical printing techniques to superimpose sparks on Superman's body to depict bullets bouncing off. The special effects team members named previously shared the 1978 Academy Award for Best Visual Effects. Bowie died in January 1979 before he could collect his Oscar. Field described him as fantastically inventive with "an ability to make do with string when other people used rope". The team also shared the Michael Balcon award for Outstanding British Contribution to Cinema at the 1978 British Academy Film Awards.

== Later films ==
Field also worked with director Jim Henson on The Dark Crystal (1982) and Labyrinth (1986), both of which received BAFTA nominations for visual effects. He received the inaugural British Society of Cinematographers Charles D. Staffell Award for Visual Effects in 2001. Field's last credit was for Mutiny (2002), an episode in the television film series Hornblower. He died on 23 May 2002.
