= Romaine Hart =

British film executive

Romaine Jennifer Hart OBE
- Born: Romaine Bloom; 14 June 1933; Streatham, London, England
- Died: 28 December 2021 (aged 88)
- Occupations: Cinema owner; Film distributor
- Spouse: John Hart (m. 1958; div. 1981)
- Children: 2

Romaine Jennifer Hart (14 June 1933 – 28 December 2021) was a British film executive. She opened the Screen on the Green in Islington, London, and founded a small film distribution company.

== Early life and education ==
Hart was born in Streatham, London, the only child of Goldie and Alex Bloom. Her father's family had been involved in the cinema business since the silent film era. She left school in Brighton at sixteen and attended secretarial college, but was allowed to help organise the Royal Cinema in Deal.

== Career ==
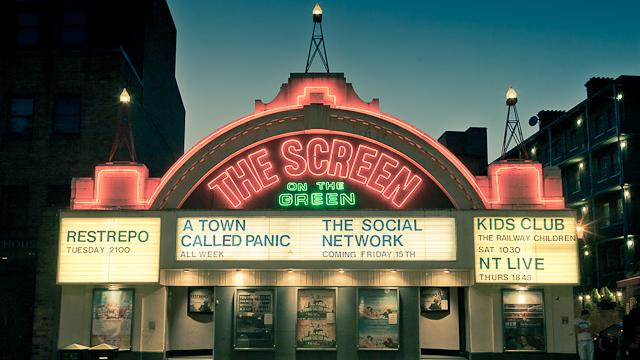
The Screen on The Green, pictured in 2019

In 1968, Hart inherited a financial interest in Bloom Theatres following the death of her father. Two years later, she transformed one of the family's venues, the Rex Cinema in Islington, into the Screen on the Green. The first film screened at the re-opened venue was the 1969 film Downhill Racer, starring Robert Redford. The opening night audience included Richard Attenborough, Laurence Olivier and Brian Forbes.

Hart told the BBC in a 1986 interview: “I wanted the cinema to show the films that I would like to see myself. Also, I wanted the cinema to have some kind of character.”

The Screen on the Green screened notable films including Picnic at Hanging Rock, Monty Python's Life of Brian, Nashville, Taxi Driver and Pink Flamingos. The cinema also ran all-night screenings.

Hart expanded her cinema circuit to six additional venues, mostly in London, including Screen on the Hill in Belsize Park, The Screen on Baker Street and The Screen Cinema in Winchester. Screen on the Hill hosted a children’s club that attracted notable figures including Roald Dahl, Michael Palin and local executive Tom Maschler.

To secure films for her cinemas, Hart founded her own distribution company, Mainline Films. She acquired UK distribution rights to films including Maîtresse, The Fourth Man, This Is Spinal Tap, My Beautiful Laundrette, Pee-wee's Big Adventure and The Loveless.

She sat on the board of the National Film and Television School and the National Film Finance Corporation, with David Puttnam under the management of Mamoun Hassan. Hart was appointed Officer of the Order of the British Empire (OBE) in the 1994 New Year Honours for services to the film industry.

Hart retired in 2008, selling her seven-cinema portfolio to Everyman for £7 million. She died on 28 December 2021 at the age of 88.
