= BAFTA Outstanding British Contribution to Cinema Award =

British film industry award

Outstanding British Contribution to Cinema Award
- Awarded for: In recognition of outstanding contribution to cinema
- Country: United Kingdom
- Presented by: British Academy of Film and Television Arts (BAFTA)
- First award: 1978
- Currently held by: Clare Binns (2025)
- Website: bafta.org

The Outstanding British Contribution to Cinema Award is an annual award, first introduced in 1978 and presented in honor of Michael Balcon, given by the British Academy of Film and Television Arts charity. The award was originally named the Michael Balcon Award but was renamed to its current title in 2006.

The inaugural recipient of the award was the special visual effects team from the 1978 film Superman and has been presented every year except 2021 and 2022.

In 2020, the award was originally awarded to Noel Clarke but was later rescinded due to numerous allegations of sexual misconduct.

== Honorees ==
indicates the winner

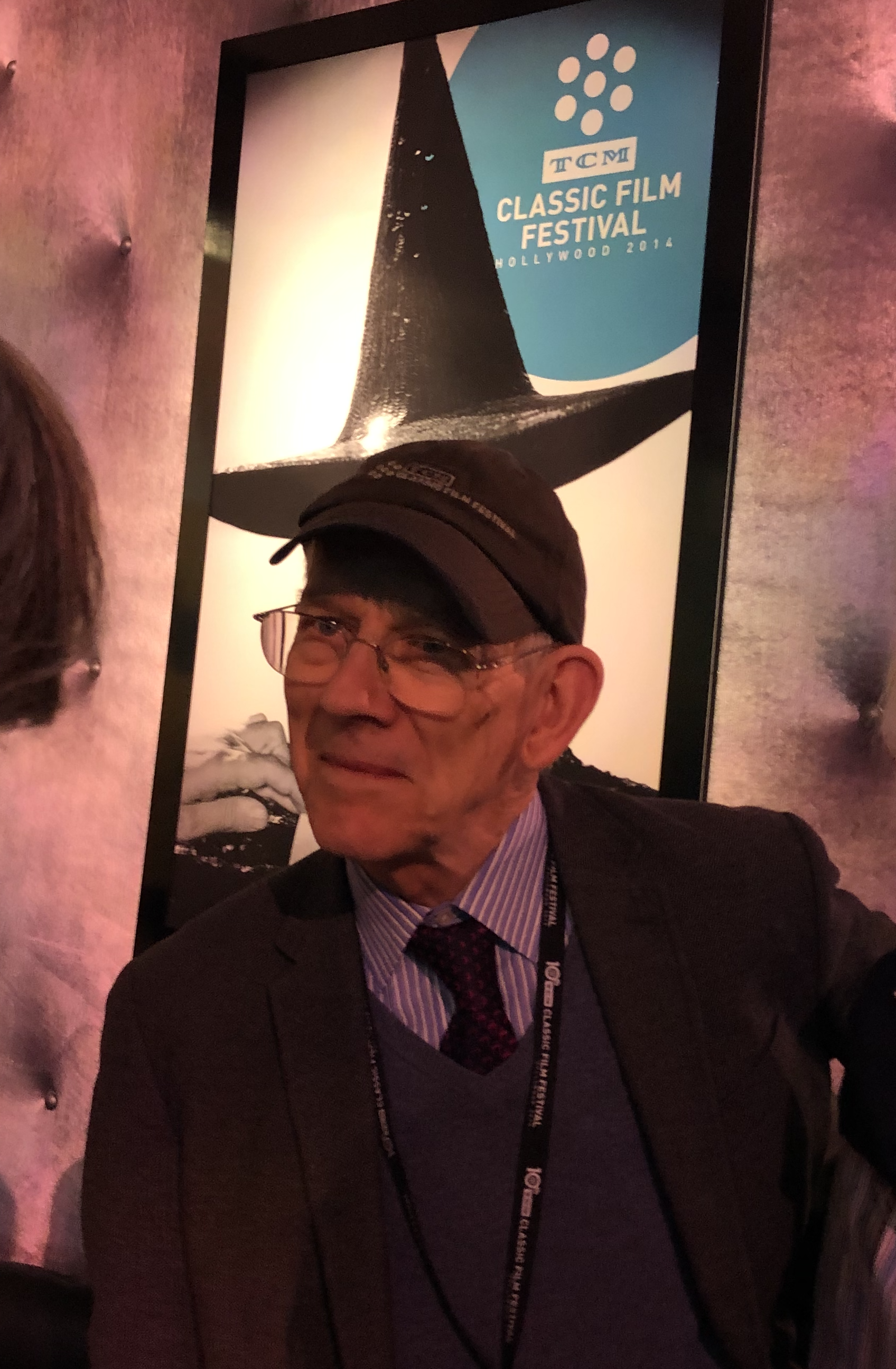
Kevin Brownlow, the 1980 winner.

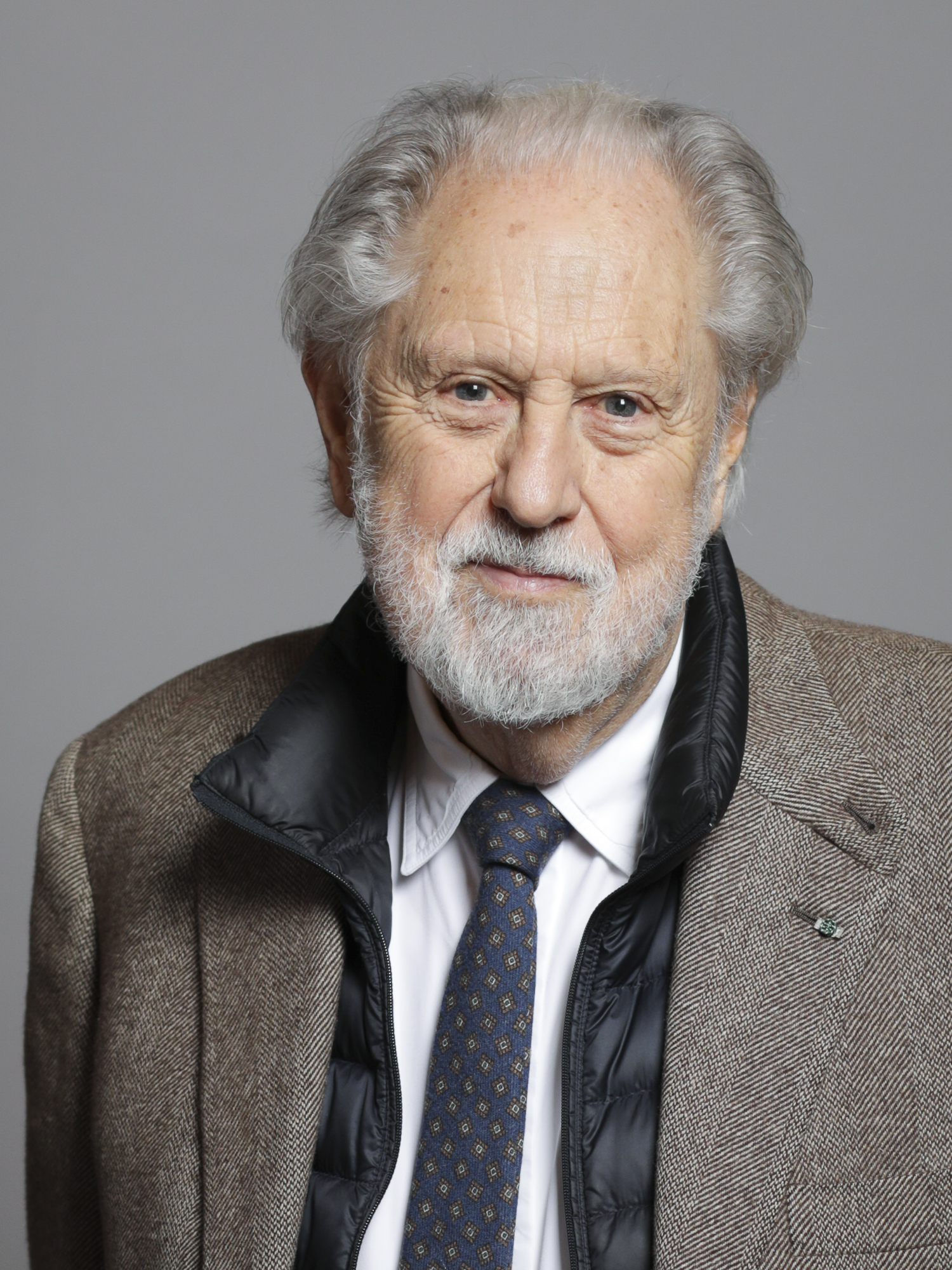
Lord David Puttnam won the award during the 1981 ceremony.

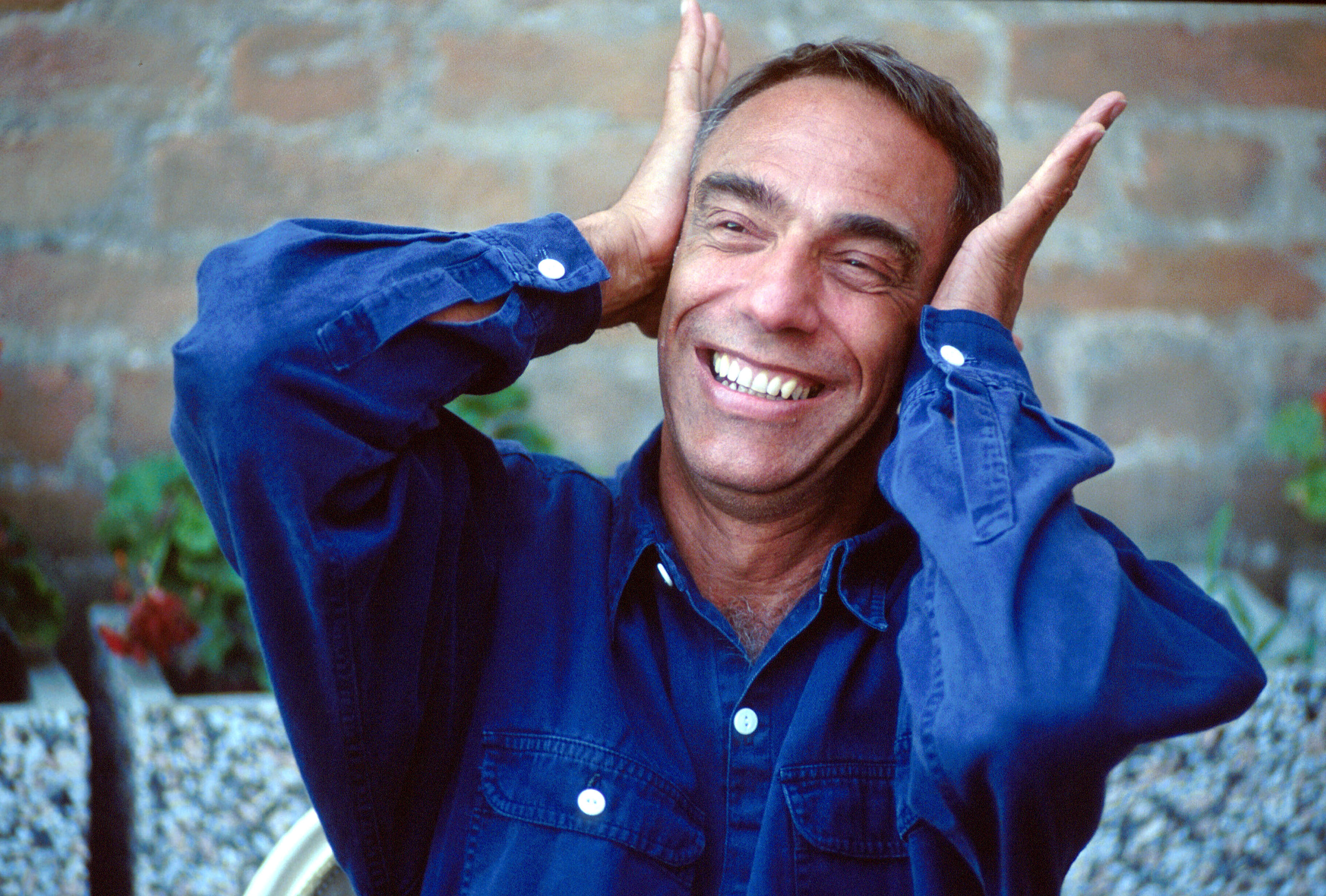
1991 recipient, filmmaker Derek Jarman.

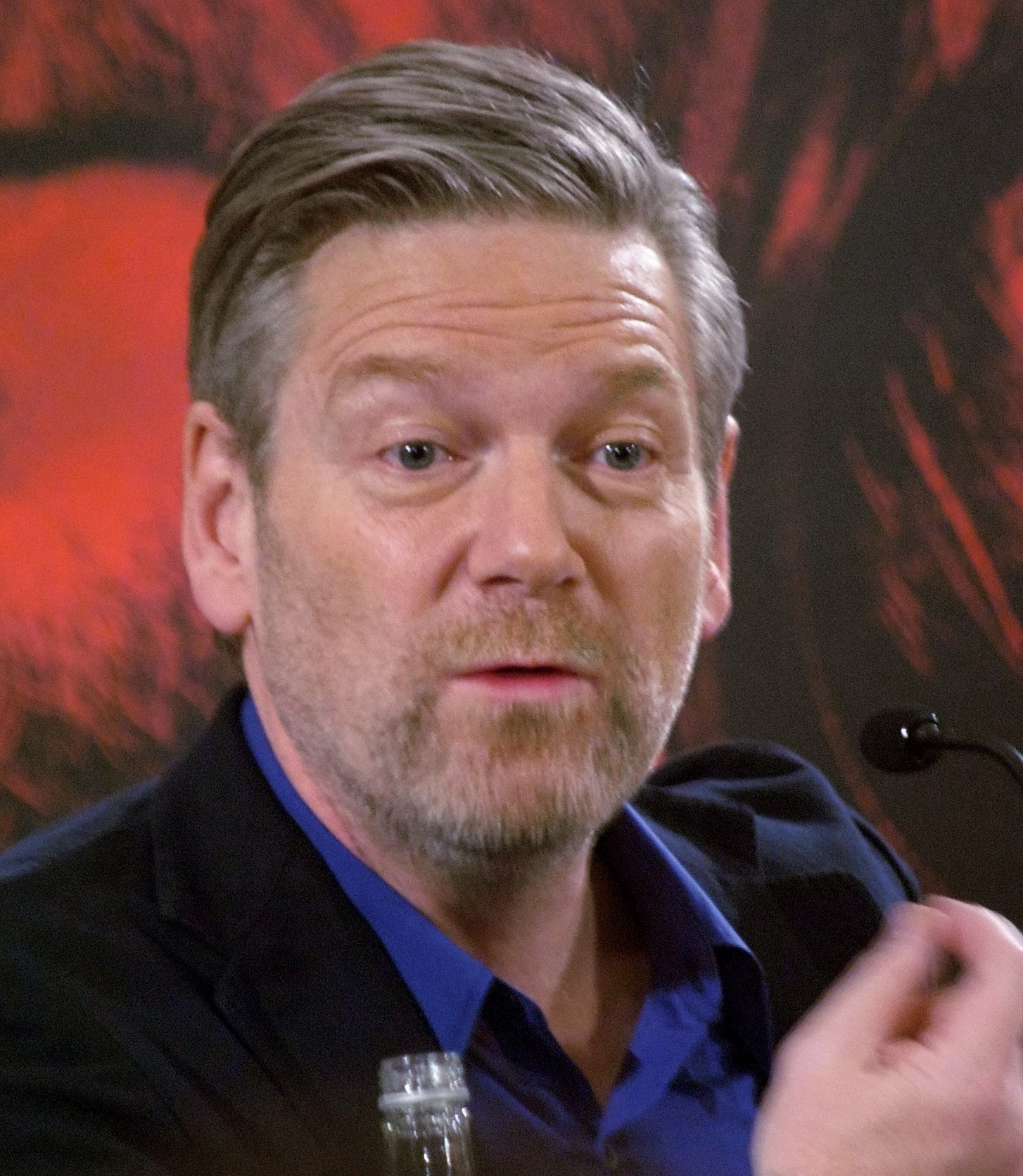
Actor and filmmaker Sir Kenneth Branagh won the award in 1992.

Film4 Productions were the recipients in 1996.

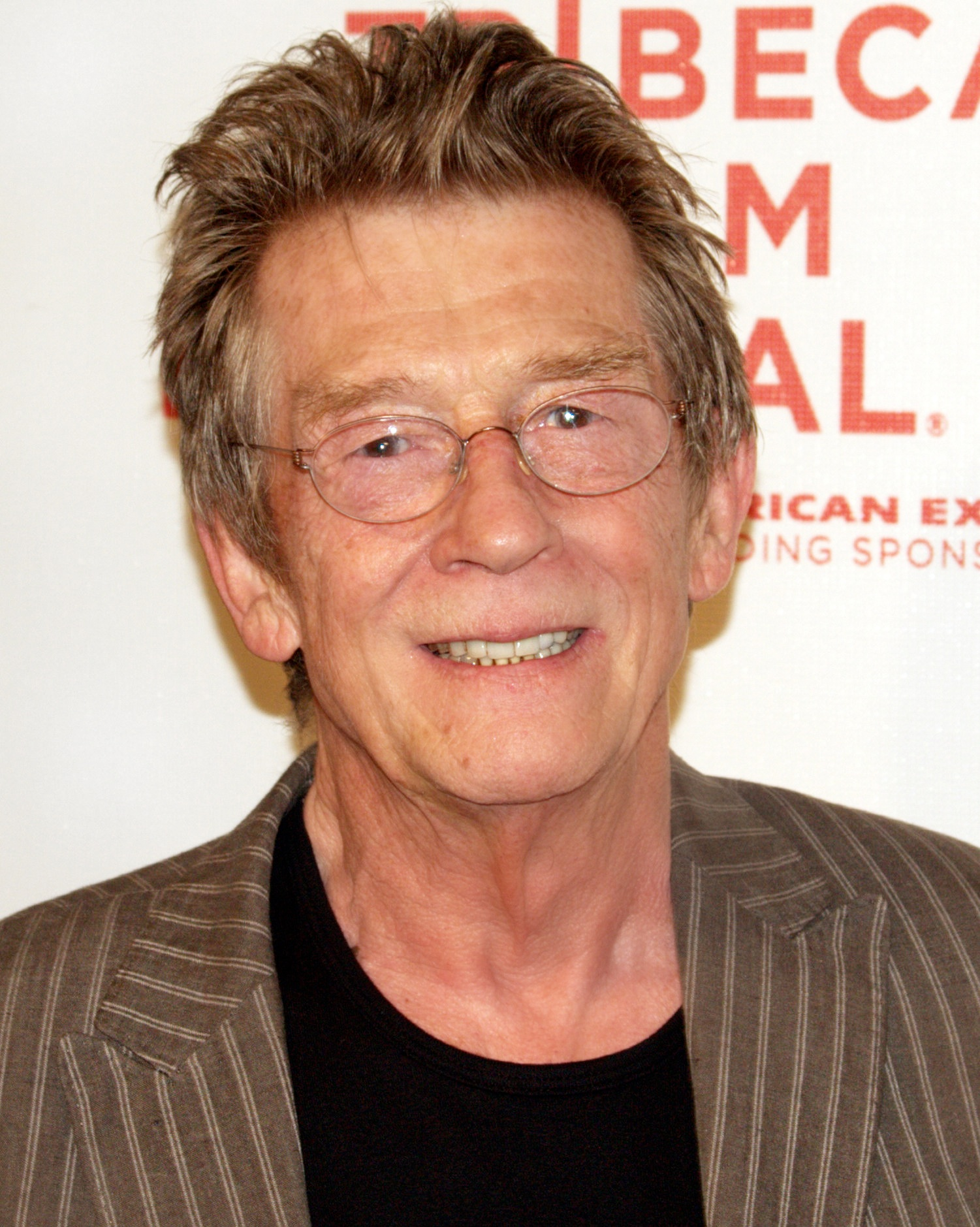
Sir John Hurt won the award in 2011.

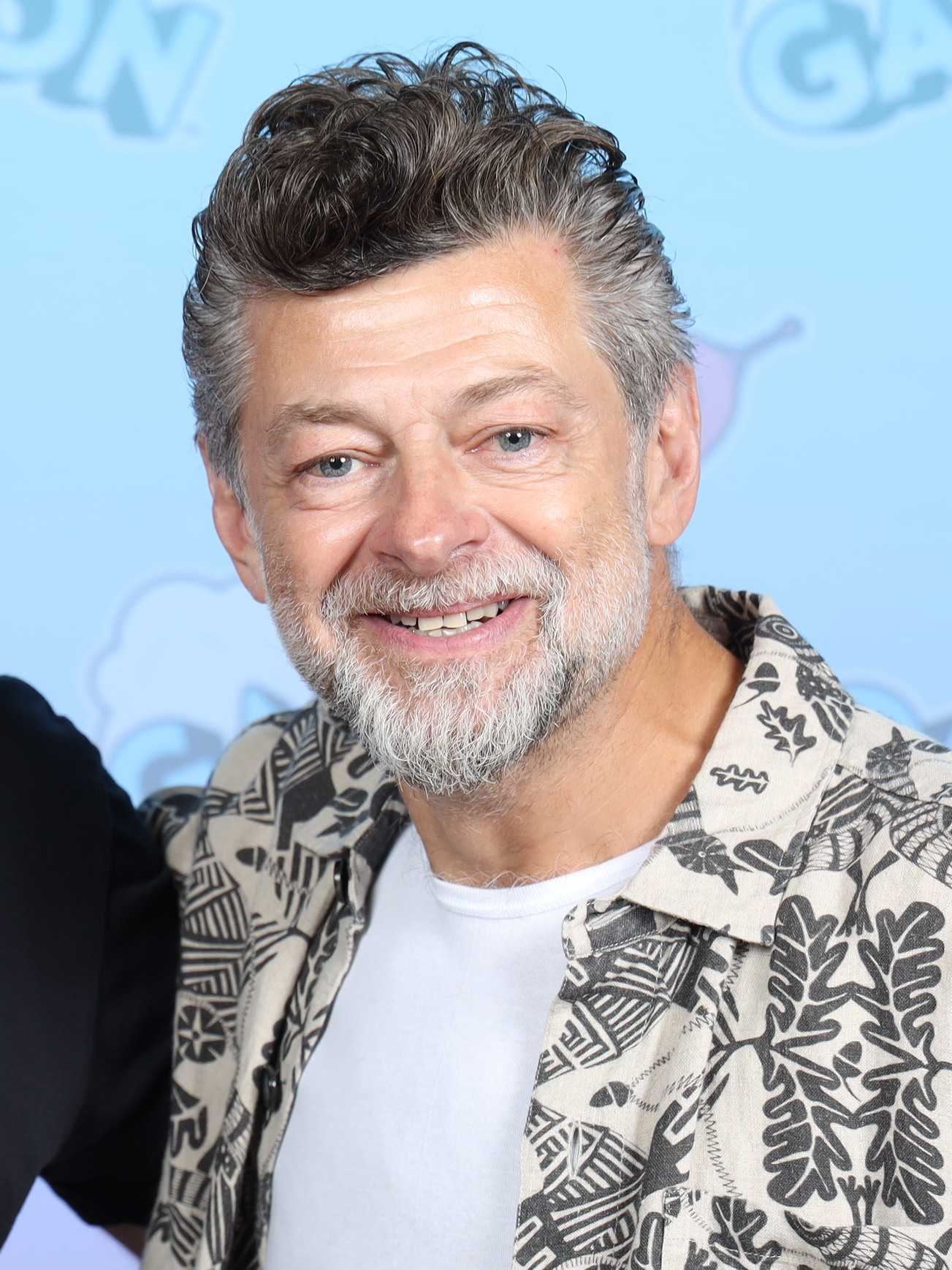
2019 winner, actor and filmmaker Andy Serkis.

=== 1970s ===
Year	Recipient(s)	Ref
1978 (32nd)	Les Bowie, Colin Chilvers, Denys Coop, Roy Field, Derek Meddings, Zoran Perisic and Wally Veevers (Special Visual Effects Team – Superman)	
1979 (33rd)	The Children's Film Foundation	

=== 1980s ===
Year	Recipient(s)	Ref
1980 (34th)	Kevin Brownlow	
1981 (35th)	David Puttnam (CBE)	
1982 (36th)	Arthur Wooster	
1983 (37th)	Colin Young (CBE)	
1984 (38th)	Alan Parker (CBE) and Alan Marshall	
1985 (39th)	Sydney Samuelson (CBE)	
1986 (40th)	The Film Production Executives	
1987 (41st)	Monty Python	
1988 (42nd)	Charles Crichton	
1989 (43rd)	Lewis Gilbert (CBE)	

=== 1990s ===
Year	Recipient(s)	Ref
1990 (44th)	Jeremy Thomas (CBE)	
1991 (45th)	Derek Jarman	
1992 (46th)	Kenneth Branagh	
1993 (47th)	Ken Loach	
1994 (48th)	Ridley Scott and Tony Scott	
1995 (49th)	Mike Leigh (OBE)	
1996 (50th)	Film4 Productions	
1997 (51st)	Michael Roberts	
1998 (52nd)	Michael Kuhn	
1999 (53rd)	Joyce Herlihy	

=== 2000s ===
Year	Recipient(s)	Ref
2000 (54th)	Mary Selway	
2001 (55th)	Vic Armstrong	
2002 (56th)	Michael Stevenson and David Tomblin	
2003 (57th)	Working Title Films	
2004 (58th)	Angela Allen (script supervisor) (MBE)	
2005 (59th)	Robert Finch and Billy Merrell	
Outstanding British Contribution to Cinema Award
2006 (60th)	Nick Daubney	
2007 (61st)	Barry Wilkinson	
2008 (62nd)	Pinewood Studios and Shepperton Studios	
2009 (63rd)	Joe Dunton	

=== 2010s ===
Year	Recipient(s)	Ref
2010 (64th)	The Harry Potter film series	
2011 (65th)	John Hurt	
2012 (66th)	Tessa Ross	
2013 (67th)	Peter Greenaway	
2014 (68th)	BBC Films	
2015 (69th)	Angels Costumes	
2016 (70th)	Curzon	
2017 (71st)	National Film and Television School	
2018 (72nd)	Stephen Woolley and Elizabeth Karlsen	
2019 (73rd)	Andy Serkis	

=== 2020s ===
Year	Recipient(s)	Ref
2020 (74th)	~~Noel Clarke~~ (Note: Suspended on 29 April 2021 due to numerous sexual misconduct accusations.)	
2021 (75th)	Not awarded	
2022 (76th)	Not awarded	
2023 (77th)	June Givanni	
2024 (78th)	MediCinema	
2025 (79th)	Clare Binns	
