= Great Expectations (2012 film) =

- Theatrical release poster
- Directed by: Mike Newell
- Screenplay by: David Nicholls
- Based on: Great Expectations; 1861 novel by Charles Dickens
- Produced by: David Faigenblum; Elizabeth Karlsen; Emanuel Michael; Stephen Woolley
- Starring: Jeremy Irvine; Robbie Coltrane; Holliday Grainger; Helena Bonham Carter; Ralph Fiennes
- Cinematography: John Mathieson
- Edited by: Tariq Anwar
- Music by: Richard Hartley
- Production companies: 982 Media; BFI; BBC Films; Unison Films; HanWay Films; Lipsync Productions; Number 9 Films
- Distributed by: Lionsgate
- Release dates: 11 September 2012 (Toronto); 30 November 2012 (United Kingdom)
- Running time: 128 minutes
- Countries: United Kingdom; United States
- Language: English
- Box office: $6.2 million

Great Expectations is a 2012 romantic period drama film based on Charles Dickens' 1861 novel. The film was directed by Mike Newell and adapted by David Nicholls, and stars Jeremy Irvine, Helena Bonham Carter, Holliday Grainger, Ralph Fiennes and Robbie Coltrane. It was distributed by Lionsgate.

Nicholls adapted the screenplay after being asked to work on it by producers Elizabeth Karlsen and Stephen Woolley, with whom he had worked on And When Did You Last See Your Father?. Helena Bonham Carter was asked by Newell to appear as Miss Havisham and accepted the role after some initial apprehension, while Irvine was initially intimidated by the thought of appearing on screen as Pip.

The film premiered at the Toronto International Film Festival. It was released in the UK on 30 November 2012.

== Cast ==
- Jeremy Irvine as Pip, an orphan. Irvine gained the role of Pip, having previously starred in Steven Spielberg's adaptation of War Horse, which Irvine described as his big break, having previously appeared in minor roles with the Royal Shakespeare Company. Irvine found the role intimidating, but said that he "wanted to make my character Pip stronger and more driven than how he's been played in adaptations before".
  - Toby Irvine, the younger brother of Jeremy Irvine, as young Pip.
- Helena Bonham Carter as Miss Havisham, wealthy spinster who has taken up a life of seclusion following the loss of her love and whom Pip suspects is his benefactor. Bonham Carter was concerned about playing Havisham and questioned Mike Newell when he phoned her to talk about taking the part. She was worried about the typical appearance of the character, describing her as a pensioner in a bridesmaids dress. Newell assured her that she was the right age, as the character in the book is in her forties, and she accepted the role.
- Ralph Fiennes as Magwitch, a criminal who changes Pip's life. Fiennes hadn't read a great deal of Dickens' work prior to gaining the role. Following the filming of Great Expectations, he moved onto another Dickens-related role, both directing and playing the author himself in The Invisible Woman.
- Robbie Coltrane as Mr Jaggers, a lawyer responsible for handling Pip's money. Great Expectations was Coltrane's first Dickens-related role. He had been offered the role of Mr. Micawber in an adaptation of David Copperfield some years previously, but was unable to take it. Coltrane described Jaggers as a "heartless bastard", and was pleased to be able to deliver the line to Pip about "great expectations", which took several takes to perfect.

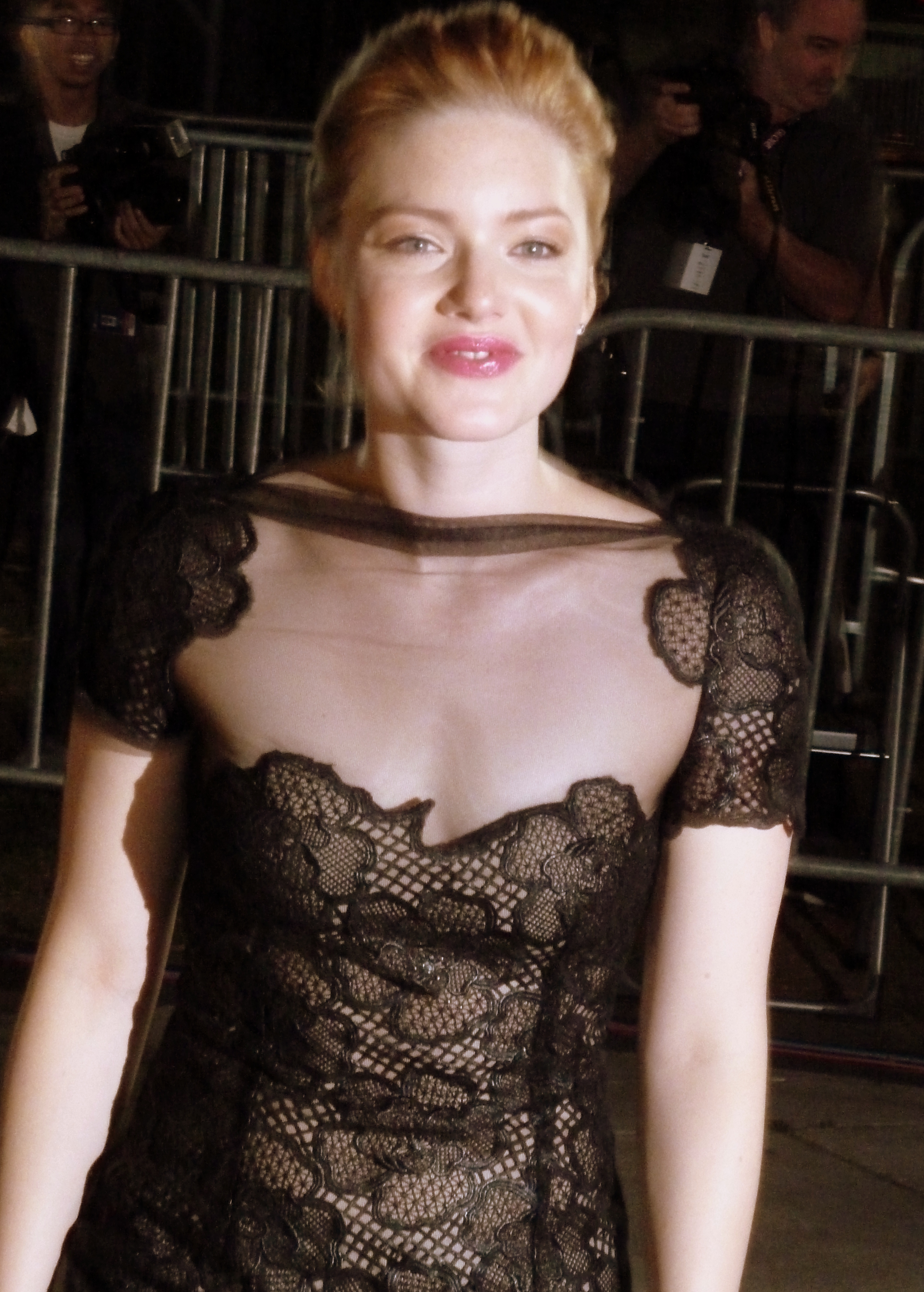
Holliday Grainger at the preview of Great Expectations at the Toronto Film Festival

- Jason Flemyng as Joe Gargery, Pip's brother-in-law and legal guardian. Flemyng was pleased to be able to appear in a film which he could take his children to see, and thought it'd be great for the Christmas period.
- Holliday Grainger as Estella; Newell encouraged Grainger to bring sensuality to her role. Grainger has said in interviews that the role was the one which she has coveted more than any other.
  - Helena Barlow as young Estella
- Ewen Bremner as Wemmick
- Sally Hawkins as Mrs Joe
- David Walliams as Uncle Pumblechook, Joe Gargery's uncle, and provides a route for Pip to be in touch with Miss Havisham. Walliams brought his mother along to the film's premiere.
- Tamzin Outhwaite as Molly
- Daniel Weyman as Arthur Havisham
- Jessie Cave as Biddy
  - Bebe Cave as young Biddy
- Edward George Fleming as Charles Pocket
- Olly Alexander as Herbert Pocket
- Ben Lloyd-Hughes as Bentley Drummle
- William Ellis as Compeyson

== Production ==
=== Development ===
The film is the seventh film version of Charles Dickens' novel. David Nicholls was asked to develop the screenplay after he had worked on the 2007 film And When Did You Last See Your Father?, and while he was working on an adaptation for television of Thomas Hardy's Tess of the d'Urbervilles for the BBC. He had worked with producers Elizabeth Karlsen and Stephen Woolley on the 2007 film, and they approached him to work on Great Expectations. During the development of the film, Nicholls published the novel One Day, which was subsequently adapted into a film in 2011. Nicholls described in interviews that he saw Dickens' work as his childhood defining novel, having first read the book when he was 14 and it having since remained his favourite. He also praised the 1946 version, directed by David Lean.

Mike Newell was looking to develop Dickens' Dombey and Son for the screen, but after it didn't go ahead, he was told about Nicholls' script. The two worked together on further developing the screenplay and finding the funding for the film. Nicholls thought there was a problem with choosing the ending for the film, as Dickens wrote both a downbeat ending and a more positive version. He described their solution as, "What we've tried to do is to make it work as a love story without sentimentalising the book", having criticised the ending of the David Lean version.

=== Filming ===
The former headquarters of Gillette on the A4 road was used as the main filming location. The interior was transformed into a Victorian era street scene.

The production also shot many scenes in Kent including St Thomas a Becket Church in Fairfield, Swale Nature Reserve Shellness, Oare and Elmley Marshes, Stangate Creek, The Historic Dockyard in Chatham and Thames and Medway Canal.

== Release ==
The film premiered at the 2012 Toronto International Film Festival on 11 September 2012. The European premiere was the closing night gala of the 2012 BFI London Film Festival which took place at the Odeon Leicester Square on 21 October 2012. Both Helena Bonham Carter and her then-partner Tim Burton were inducted into the British Film Institute Fellowship at the event. In the UK, advance screenings were scheduled for 26 November 2012, with the nationwide release date of 30 November as a 12A rated release.

== Reception ==
Great Expectations received generally positive reviews from critics. On Rotten Tomatoes, the film has a rating of 70%, based on 81 reviews, with an average rating of 6.20/10. The site's critical consensus reads, "Not the best version of the oft-filmed Dickens classic but far from the worst, Mike Newell's Great Expectations breathes just enough life into the source material to justify yet another adaptation." On Metacritic, the film holds a score of 60 out of 100, based on 23 reviews, indicating "mixed or average" reviews.
