= Elizabeth Karlsen =

British film producer

- Born: New York City, United States
- Occupation: Film producer
- Years active: 1986–present
- Employer: Sony Pictures Animation (2016–present)
- Spouse: Stephen Woolley

Elizabeth Karlsen is an American–British film producer. Her career has spanned over three and a half decades, and in 2019, she was awarded the BAFTA award for Outstanding British Contribution to Cinema. Her work has garnered a total of 52 BAFTA nominations and wins, and 20 Academy Award® nominations and wins. In 2002, she co-founded Number 9 Films with production partner and husband, Stephen Woolley.

== Career ==
She has produced independent films in the US and Europe including: Todd Haynes’s CAROL (nominated for 6 Academy Awards®, 6 Golden Globe Awards and 9 BAFTA Awards) Mark Herman’s LITTLE VOICE (winner of a Golden Globe Award, nominated for 1 Academy Award®, 6 Golden Globe Awards and 6 BAFTA Awards) Neil Jordan’s THE CRYING GAME (winner of an Academy Award®, a BAFTA Award and nominated for 6 Academy Awards®), MADE IN DAGENHAM (nominated for 3 BAFTA Awards) and Phyllis Nagy’s MRS HARRIS (nominated for 12 Emmy® Awards, 3 Golden Globe Awards and a PGA Award) and Wash Westmoreland’s COLETTE (Nominated for 4 BIFA’s and an Independent Spirit Award). Other work includes: ON CHESIL BEACH, written by Ian McEwan and directed by Dominic Cooke; THEIR FINEST, directed by Lone Scherfig; THE LIMEHOUSE GOLEM written by Jane Goldman and directed by Juan Carlos Medina, GREAT EXPECTATIONS, written by David Nicholls and directed by Mike Newell, THE NEON BIBLE directed by Terence Davies and BYZANTIUM directed by Neil Jordan and as co-producer Paolo Sorrentino’s YOUTH (nominated for 1 Academy Award® and winner of 3 European Film Awards). She also produced the international box office success Ladies in Lavender, starring Maggie Smith and Judi Dench.

She has had multiple films selected for Palme D’Or competition in Cannes and premieres in international film festivals including TIFF, LFF, NY and Sundance.

In addition to film work, MADE IN DAGENHAM: THE MUSICAL opened in London’s West End in 2014 starring Gemma Arterton.

Elizabeth has served on the board of The Edinburgh Film Festival, the NFTS Gala, the American Academy of Motion Pictures and Arts Events Committee, and was chair of Women in Film and TV UK.

In 2025, Karlsen was the Jury President of the Official Competition at the 69th BFI London Film Festival.

== Filmography ==
Director's name in brackets after film title.

- 2021: Mothering Sunday (Eva Husson)
- 2018: Colette (Wash Westmoreland)
- 2017: On Chesil Beach (Dominic Cooke)
- 2017: The Limehouse Golem (Juan Carlos Medina)
- 2016: Their Finest (Lone Scherfig)
- 2015: Carol (Todd Haynes)
- 2015: Youth (Paolo Sorrentino) (co-producer)
- 2014: Hyena (Gerard Johnson)
- 2012: Great Expectations (Mike Newell)
- 2012: Byzantium (Neil Jordan)
- 2012: Midnight's Children (Deepa Mehta) (co-producer)
- 2010: Made in Dagenham (Nigel Cole)
- 2009: Perrier's Bounty (Ian Fitzgibbon)
- 2008: How to Lose Friends & Alienate People (Robert B. Weide)
- 2008: Sounds Like Teen Spirit (Jamie Jay Johnson)
- 2007: And When Did You Last See Your Father? (Anand Tucker)
- 2006: Sixty Six (Paul Weiland)
- 2005: Mrs. Harris (Phyllis Nagy) (executive producer)
- 2004: Ladies in Lavender (Charles Dance)
- 2000: Purely Belter (Mark Herman)
- 1998: Little Voice (Mark Herman)
- 1996: Hollow Reed (Angela Pope)
- 1995: The Neon Bible (Terence Davies)
- 1992: The Crying Game (Neil Jordan) (co-producer)
- 1991: The Pope Must Diet (Peter Richardson) (co-producer)
- 1990: Hardware (Richard Stanley) (supervising producer)
