= The Screen on the Green =

Single-screen cinema in London, England

Coordinates: 51.536846°N 0.103641°W

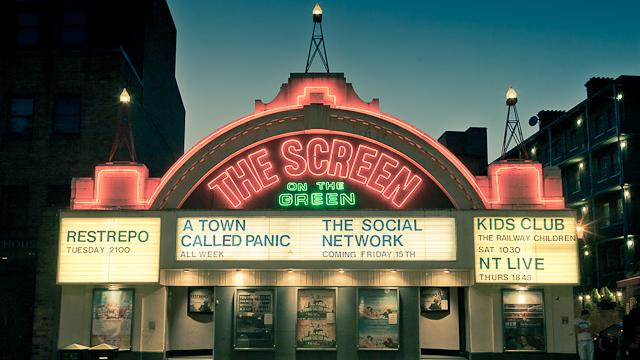
- Interactive map of The Screen on the Green
- Former names: The Empress Picture Theatre (1913–1951); The Rex (1951–1970)
- Address: 83 Upper Street; London; England
- Operator: Everyman
- Screen: 1

Construction
- Opened: 1913
- Reopened: 1970

Website
- Official website

The Screen on the Green, also known as Everyman Screen On The Green, is a single-screen cinema facing Islington Green in the London Borough of Islington, London, England. The current building was opened in 1913 and it is one of the oldest continuously running cinemas in the UK. It is an example of the many purpose-built cinemas that followed the regulations set by the Cinematograph Act 1909. The idea of cinema was re-invented here by Romaine Hart in 1970 and it was seen as a model for new stylish cinemas in the UK. It became a venue for bands such as the Sex Pistols and The Clash, and a place to be seen in the 1970s and '80s. Hart sold the cinema in 2008, and it is now (as of 2025) run by Everyman Cinemas.

== History ==
=== Early history (1910–1913) ===
The Pesaresi brothers ran their original animated picture show at 83 Upper Street. With finance from Thomas Harrold who ran the "fancy drapery" store next door at number 82, they bought out Stean's Printers, Fosdykes' Confectionery and Vivian Lester's Sign Writers, numbers 84 to 86 respectively. They demolished the old shops and built an electric theatre designed by architects Boreham & Gladding, which opened in October 1913.

=== The Empress Picture Theatre (1913–1951) ===
Renamed from The Empress Electric Theatre shortly after opening, the new cinema seated 600 on a single floor. It was originally considered very smart, though by the late 1930s it had become tatty and was compared unfavourably with the new picture palaces of the time.

=== The Rex (1951–1970) ===
The Empress was closed, refurbished and re-opened in December 1951 as The Rex. Its capacity was reduced slightly to 514 and a new single-price policy was introduced, initially with each seat costing 1s 9d. The reopening ceremony included a fanfare of trumpets from the Islington Air Training Corps.

In the early 1960s, the cinema ran regular film shows for the local Turkish population. The films were specially flown over from Turkey and shown without subtitles. In the late 1960s, the local Greek community organised Greek-language film shows that ran every Sunday. The Rex closed on 20 June 1970. It was known as a "fleapit".

=== The Screen on the Green (1970–present) ===
The cinema re-opened on 13 September 1970 as The Screen on the Green, after being purchased by Romaine Hart's Mainline Pictures Group. It was comprehensively refurbished and modernised in February 1981 to plans by architect Fletcher Priest, one of the main modifications being the creation of foyer space, something the original building never had. This reduced the seating capacity to 300. It was operated as part of the small independent Screen Cinemas circuit, which had seven cinemas in and around London, including Screen on the Hill in Belsize Park, The Screen on Baker Street and The Screen in Winchester. In 2008, the circuit was sold to the Everyman Media Group.

In December 2009, the cinema underwent its third major refurbishment, the main change being the addition of a full size bar within the auditorium space. The Screen on the Green's 2009 refurbishment included the addition of a full-size stage in front of the screen, making the venue more suitable for live events.

Romaine Hart died on 28 December 2021, at the age of 88.

=== Everyman ===
As of November 2025 the cinema is under the Everyman banner, also known as Everyman Screen on the Green.

== Live events ==
The cinema is known for its "Midnight Special" on Sunday, 29 August 1976, when the Clash and Buzzcocks supported the Sex Pistols in a showcase event organised by Malcolm McLaren. This was the Clash's third gig, and the first ever to be recorded; it was one of the earliest known recorded live performances of the Sex Pistols, and one of very few recordings with Glen Matlock. The Screen on the Green was the location for the first performance of Sid Vicious with the Sex Pistols, on 3 April 1977, following the dismissal of Matlock from the band.

Since its 2009 refurbishment, the cinema has hosted comedy from Stewart Lee, Stephen K Amos, and Phill Jupitus, among others.

== In popular culture ==
The cinema is referenced throughout Adam and the Ants' song "Fall In" – released as the B-side to "Antmusic" in 1980.

This cinema also appeared in the 1981 music video "The Voice", by the musical group Ultravox.

== Transport ==
Angel tube station

== External links and source material ==
- Official website
- Draper, Chris (1989). Islington's Cinemas and Film Studios. London: Islington Library. ISBN 0-902260-21-9.
- "Social and cultural activities". british-history.ac.uk, British History Online.
- Tim at The Clash Blog. "Clash Landmarks – The Screen on The Green, Islington". theclashblog.com.
- The Screen on the Green at Cinema Treasures
