= Sounds Like Teen Spirit =

- Theatrical release poster
- Directed by: Jamie Jay Johnson
- Produced by: Simon Fawcett, Maxyne Franklin, Jess Search, Paul White
- Starring: Marina Baltadzi, Yiorgos Ioannides, Mariam Romelashvili, Mirek Coutigny, Laurens Platteeuw, Matthieu Renier, Eva Storme, Bab Buelens
- Edited by: Lucien Clayton
- Music by: Mat Davidson
- Distributed by: Warner Music
- Release dates: 9 September 2008 (Toronto International Film Festival); 8 May 2009 (United Kingdom)
- Running time: 100 minutes
- Country: United Kingdom
- Languages: English, Bulgarian, Dutch, Georgian, Greek

Sounds Like Teen Spirit (also known as Sounds Like Teen Spirit: A Popumentary) is a 2008 documentary and debut feature film of Bafta-Award nominated director Jamie Jay Johnson.

It was shown at the Toronto International Film Festival 2008 and was premiered in Ghent, Belgium and Limassol, Cyprus where the 2008 Junior Eurovision Song Contest was held.

== Plot ==
It follows the lives of the participants of the Junior Eurovision Song Contest 2007, specifically the entrants from Belgium, Bulgaria, Cyprus and Georgia. The film sees them proceed from the national finals that saw them crowned the representatives of their country through to the international song festival itself held in Rotterdam, the Netherlands, where they each compete against 16 other acts.

== Critical reception ==
The film was well received by critics, on Rotten Tomatoes it has an approval rating of 87% based on reviews from 23 critics. Director Johnson was praised for his 'crowdpleasing' debut and his success in getting the participants to 'open-up' on camera.

In the 2009 Dinard British Film Festival in Brittany, France 'Sounds Like Teen Spirit' played in competition and won the prestigious 'Hitchcock D’Argent' Audience Award.

In the Seattle International film festival 2009 the film won a Special Jury Award and was highly commended by the jury "for excellence in capturing the universal experience of young adults discovering their place in the world".

Sounds Like Teen Spirit was also nominated for a British Independent Film Award in the 'Best Documentary' category.
