= Trees A Crowd =

Natural history podcast

- Genre: Natural History
- Language: English

Cast and voices
- Hosted by: David Oakes

Music
- Opening theme: "The Oak and the Ivy" by Bella Hardy

Production
- Production: David Oakes

Technical specifications
- Audio format: Podcast (via streaming or downloadable MP3)

Publication
- No. of seasons: 6
- No. of episodes: 148
- Original release: 25 February 2019
- Updates: Monthly

Related
- Website: www.treesacrowd.fm

Trees A Crowd is a natural history podcast presented by actor & ecologist David Oakes.

== Creation and reception of the podcast ==
Oakes, as an environmentalist and an ambassador for the Woodland Trust and The Wildlife Trusts, started Trees A Crowd as a series of informal conversations with artists, scientists and enthusiasts.

Speaking on the Dominic King show on BBC Radio Kent on 19 July 2019, David said in regards to why he started the podcast:

If we live in a world of identity politics where personality trumps any viable policy or common sense, then maybe we can use that for betterment too. So, if we can get someone who is fascinating who can take you through their life story and their idiosyncratic interests and pastimes and accidental encounters with griffins or narwhals or fantastical or factual beasts across time, then maybe we can then be seduced into fewer plastic bottles or driving your car a little less often.

Each episode explores how the countryside has inspired different career trajectories. Speaking to Countryman Magazine in June 2019, Oakes said:

I decided to seek out others who, like me, have a meaningful connection with the rolling hills, misty moors, babbling brooks, and dappled woodlands of our glorious Great Britain. I wanted to discover how the countryside — and its many-legged inhabitants — inspired their careers, and how growing up within the natural world became working for the natural world.

Jenny Perrone, writing for The Guardian, described the podcast as “a treat for your ears” and the Geographical Magazine praised the podcast: "In a world of high-energy, jingle-ridden podcasts and antagonistic radio shows Trees a Crowd makes for a pleasantly gentle listen. Both nostalgic and forward looking it covers some of the biggest issues facing the natural world through the medium of relaxed, informal conversation."

As of 28 May 2021, Trees a Crowd is to be added to the British Library Sound Archive (formerly the National Sound Archive) for its value as part of the nation's audio and cultural heritage. And, as of August 2021, it is ranked as the #1 Nature podcast in Great Britain on Apple podcasts.

== Guest list ==
=== Series one ===
- 25 February 2019 – Mark Frith, BAFTA-winning documentary maker and Artist
- 11 March 2019 – Polly Morgan, Artist and Taxidermist
- 25 March 2019 – David Fettes, Wildlife Photographer
- 8 April 2019 – Astrid Goldsmith, Animator and Model-maker
- 15 April 2019 – Dr Katherine Brent, amongst other things, is a morris dancer and badger saboteur. This episode was released as a thematic response to the interview with Astrid Goldsmith.
- 22 April 2019 – Dr Steve Etches MBE – Fossil collector
- 29 April 2019 – Dr Ellinor Michel, molluscan systematist and ecologist at the Natural History Museum
- 6 May 2019 – Dr Fay Clark, animal welfare scientist at Bristol Zoo
- 20 May 2019 – Dr Guy Stevens, CEO and co-founder of the Manta Trust.
- 3 June 2019 – The Maldives Underwater Initiative, which includes a dozen Marine Biologists based on Laamu Atoll including some that work for the Blue Marine Foundation, the Manta Trust and the Olive Ridley Project.
- 17 June 2019 – Bella Hardy, folk singer and songwriter.
- 1 July 2019 – Wolfgang Buttress and Dr Martin Bencsik, co-creators of numerous multi-sensory artworks including the bee-inspired HIVE and BEAM.
- 15 July 2019 – Beccy Speight, the then CEO of the Woodland Trust, now the CEO of the Royal Society for the Protection of Birds.
- 29 July 2019 – Dr Terry Gough M.V.O., Head of Estates and Gardens at Hampton Court Palace.
- 12 August 2019 – Dr Jess French, television presenter, veterinarian and author.
- 26 August 2019 – Chris Watson (part one), musician and sound recordist specialising in natural history.
- 9 September 2019 – Chris Watson (part two).
- 23 September 2019 – Tannis Davidson, curator of Grant Museum of Zoology and Comparative Anatomy at University College London.
- 7 October 2019 – Harry Barton, CEO of the Devon Wildlife Trust.
- 14 October 2019 – Recorded live at the 70th Cheltenham Literature Festival in partnership with the Woodland Trust, a discussion on “The Art of Trees” with Prof. Christiana Payne and Dr Angela Summerfield.
- 21 October 2019 – Amanda Owen, the 'Yorkshire Shepherdess'.
- 4 November 2019 – Sir John Lawton, Biologist, a fellow of the Royal Society, president of the Yorkshire Wildlife Trust and chair of the Endangered Landscapes Programme.
- 18 November 2019 – Dr Jo Elworthy, botanist and head of interpretation at the Eden Project, Cornwall.
- 2 December 2019 – Dr Richard Benwell, CEO of the Wildlife and Countryside Link
- 16 December 2019 – Victoria Bromley, wildlife filmmaker and documentary maker.
- 23 December 2019 – Joanna Lentini, wildlife photographer.

=== Series two ===
- 6 January 2020 – Mark Carwardine, zoologist who achieved widespread recognition for his Last Chance to See conservation expeditions with Douglas Adams. Since then he has become a leading and outspoken conservationist, and a prolific broadcaster, columnist and photographer.
- 20 January 2020 – Dr Catherine Barlow of the South of Scotland Golden Eagle Project.
- 3 February 2020 – Dr Bryce Stewart, marine ecologist and fisheries biologist, currently a lecturer for the Department of Environment and Geography at the University of York.
- 17 February 2020 – Ingrid Newkirk, president and co-founder of PETA.
- 2 March 2020 – Rob Rose and Natalie Stoppard of Rosewood Farm on the Yorkshire Ings.
- 16 March 2020 – Tim Pears, novelist and Fellow of the Royal Society of Literature.
- 26 March 2020 – A short interview with Edward Davey of the World Resources Institute discussing agricultural concerns in the midst of COVID-19. Originally this interview was set to be recorded as a live event as part of the London Climate Change Festival which was cancelled as a result of the COVID-19 pandemic.
- 30 March 2020 – Dr Helen Pheby, head of curatorial programming at the Yorkshire Sculpture Park.
- 31 March 2020 – a topical discussion with Luci Ryan, an ecologist for the Woodland Trust, about the tactics being taken to construct the British governments HS2 rail link and their plan to transplant ancient woodlands.
- 13, 15 & 17 April 2020 – Three interviews from the Castle Howard estate, with Nick Howard (the castle's inhabitant), Nick Cooke (the head of forestry) and Alastair Gunn (head of landscapes and gardens).
- 21 April 2020 – A "World Curlew Day" special episode featuring interviews with Sir John Lawton, Amanda Owen, Chris Watson, Dr Richard Benwell, Mary Colwell, Dr Jennifer Smart of the RSPB, Rick Simpson, CEO of Wader Quest, Lucy Walker of Britten Pears Arts, Patrick Laurie and David Lindo. It also featured original music from Bella Hardy, and poetry recitals from Natalie Dormer and Samuel West.
- 27 April 2020 – Alastair Humphreys, adventurer and writer.
- 11 & 18 May 2020 – Eanna Ni Lamhna, Irish environmentalist, educator and broadcaster (a two-part interview).
- 25 May 2020 – Dara McAnulty, writer and naturalist who, at 15 years old, was the youngest recipient of the RSPB Medal.
- 1 June 2020 – An exploration of the work of the Langholm Moor community project.
- 8, 15 & 22 June 2020 – "Wildflower Women"; three interviews with ethnobotanist Jennie Martin, the founder of the Woodmeadow Trust, Rosalind Forbes Adam, and Shakespearian actor, Serena Manteghi.
- 6 July 2020 – Dr William C. Tweed, writer, historian and chief naturalist of Sequoia and Kings Canyon National Parks.
- 20 & 27 July 2020 – Prof. Kate Jones, Professor of Ecology and Biodiversity at University College London with a special interest in bats, and past chair of the Bat Conservation Trust.
- 5 Aug 2020 – Prof. Rowan Lockwood & Dr Bryce Stewart of College of William & Mary and University of York respectively, talk of the benefits of preserving the world's oyster population.
- 17 Aug 2020, Will Travers, OBE, President and co-founder of the Born Free Foundation.
- 31 Aug 2020, Georgina Lamb, CEO of David Shepherd Wildlife Foundation, and granddaughter of David Shepherd.
- 14 Sept 2020 – Mark Carwardine returned to talk about his experiences on anti-poaching patrols.
- 17 Sept 2020 – Doug Allan, wildlife cameraman and photographer best known for his work in polar regions and underwater. Dr Guy Stevens from the Manta Trust launches the inaugural 'World Manta Day'.
- 28 Sept & 5 Oct 2020 – Dr George McGavin, entomologist, author, academic, television presenter and explorer.

=== Series three ===
The third series took on a different format (see below), but it did include three interviews in keeping with the original format of the podcast.

- 4 June 2021 – Richard Nairn, Irish environmentalist, writer and forester.
- 3 September 2021 – Peter Wohlleben, German forester and writer.
- 5 November 2021 – Brigit Strawbridge Howard, writer and environmentalist.

=== Series four ===
- 24 May 2022 – George Monbiot, writer, journalist and activist.
- 7 June 2022 – Beatrice von Preussen, artist, explorer and science communicator.
- 5 July 2022 – Oakes visits Lundy to speak to the island's two wildlife wardens, Rosie Ellis and Stuart Cossey.
- 2 August 2022 – Dr Gavin Broad, entomologist and Principal Curator in Charge of Insects at Natural History Museum, London.
- 6 September 2022 – Dr Amy-Jane Beer, writer and environmental campaigner.
- 4 October 2022 – Leigh Morris, CEO of the Manx Wildlife Trust.
- 1 November 2022 – Dan Hooper, aka Swampy, environmentalist and activist.
- 6 December 2022 – Sarah Gillespie RWA, artist and printmaker.
- 10 & 17 January 2023 – Dr Trevor Dines, botanist & TV presenter.
- 7 February 2023 – Donovan Wright & Tom Gibbs, the Bison Rangers at the Wilder Blean project, and Kora Kunzmann, the Ecological Evidence and Academic Partnerships Lead at the Kent Wildlife Trust.
- 7 & 14 March 2023 – Chris Packham, naturalist and TV presenter.
- 4 April 2023 – Emma Marsh, executive officer at the Royal Society for the Protection of Birds.
- 2 May 2023 – Dr Brian Briggs, biologist and musician, lead singer of Stornoway.
- 16 May 2023 – Tan Twan Eng, Man Booker Prize-nominated novelist.
- 6 June 2023 – Sophie Pavelle, Science communicator and writer.
- 5 October 2023 – Samuel West, actor, director and RSPB Ambassador. Recorded live at the Global Bird Fair in Rutland on 16 July 2023.

=== African specials ===
- 4 July 2023 – A record of a week spent in the Kunene Desert with Save the Rhino Trust Namibia.
- 11 July 2023 – Piet Beytell and Tommy Hall, the Chief Conservation Scientist at the Namibian Government's Ministry of Environment, Forestry and Tourism, and a Wildlife Intelligence Officer, respectively.
- 1 August 2023 – Chris Fallows, conservationist, photographer and shark expert.
- 5 September 2023 – Nardstar, aka Nadia Fisher, artist and designer.
- 3 October 2023 – Paul Vorster, Director of Sanbona Nature and Wilderness Reserve.

=== Series five ===
- 7 November 2023 – Dr Paul Donald, Senior Scientist at Bird Life International.
- 5 December 2023 – Katie Holten, artist and environmental activist.
- 9 January 2024 – Dr Ruth Tingay, environmentalist and raptor conservationist.
- 13 February 2024 – Dr David Hetherington, ecologist and wild cat biologist.
- 12 March 2024 – Artist Andy Holden and Ornithologist Peter Holden; father and son.
- 9 April 2024 – A visit to the Carmarthenshire Vulture breed and release charity, The Horstmann Trust.
- 14 May 2024 – Rob Stoneman, Director of Landscape Recovery at the Wildlife Trusts.
- 11 & 18 June 2024 – Prof. Fiona Mathews & Prof. Tim Kendall, environmental biologist and nature writer respectively.
- 5 July 2024 – Matthew Oates, naturalist and nature writer.
- 9 August 2024 – Primatologist Dr Hannah Trayford and Wildlife Photographer Rachel Bigsby
- 10 September 2024 – M. G. Leonard, award-winning children's novelist and Vice President of Buglife. A bonus addendum episode was released on 1/7/25.

=== Series six ===
- 21 October 2025 – Dr Sylvia Earle, Marine biologist, explorer and founder of Mission Blue.
- 18 November 2025 - Dr Bhaskar Choudhury, veterinarian and project head of the Wildlife Trust of India’s Centre for Wildlife Rehabilitation and Conservation (CWRC).
- 20 November 2025 - Amrit Menon, department head of the Wildlife Trust of India’s Wild Aid division.
- 8 December 2025 - Iris Ho, Head of Campaigns and Policy at the Pan-African Sanctuary Alliance.
- 9 December 2025 - Abraham Joffe, documentary filmmaker.
- 17 February 2026 - Prof. Diana Pazmiño, marine biologist and conservation geneticist.
- 24 February 2026 - Prof. Carlos Mena, geographer and Director of Universidad San Francisco de Quito’s Galápagos campus and Co-Director of the Galápagos Science Centre.
- 3 March 2026 - Rakan Zahawi, Chief Executive of the Charles Darwin Foundation.
- 17 March 2026 - Darren Moorcroft, Beccy Speight and Craig Bennett; chief executives of the Woodland Trust, RSPB and The Wildlife Trusts respectively.
- 12 May 2026 - Painted Dog Conservation: Recorded on the outskirts of Hwange National Park, this episode interviews the poaching and community teams responding to the anthropogenic threats affecting African wild dogs (Lycaon pictus).

=== Bonus episodes ===
- 7 October 2019 – An additional recording with Harry Barton of the Devon Wildlife Trust, released online through SoundCloud. Recorded on the banks of the River Otter, Devon, by the site of a project to reintegrate wild beavers into the local environment.
- 22 April 2020 – Bella Hardy's new song 'Curlew', accompanied by her creative thoughts in writing the song.
- 7 Aug 2020 – An additional recording with Bryce Stewart, released online through SoundCloud, detailing how COVID-19 is affecting UK fisheries.

=== Live recordings ===
- 9 October 2019 – Recorded live at the 70th Cheltenham Literature Festival in partnership with the Woodland Trust, a discussion on “The Art of Trees” with Prof. Christiana Payne and Dr Angela Summerfield. It was eventually broadcast on 14 October 2019.
- 10 January 2020 – Recorded live at The Open Book, Wigtown, an interview with Dr Cat Barlow of the South of Scotland Golden Eagle Project. It was eventually broadcast on 20 January 2020.
- 1 November 2022 – Recorded live at Stanfords Travel Bookshop in Covent Garden, an interview with award-winning writer and science communicator, Sophie Pavelle. It was eventually broadcast on 6 June 2023.
- 16 July 2023 – Samuel West, actor, director and RSPB Ambassador. Recorded live at the 2023 Global Bird Fair in Rutland.

== Series 3: "Oakes on Oaks: 56(ish) Native Trees" ==
As a result of restrictions put in place in response to the COVID pandemic of 2020/21, the third series of Trees a Crowd temporarily took on a different format. Instead of interviews, it provided short narrative accounts – scripted and produced by Oakes – of 'the secrets and stories beneath the native tree species to the British Isles'. The series explored the folklore, history, botany, art, music and literature associated with each tree, and was illuminated by anecdotes from Oakes' personal experience. The episodes also featured soundbites from previous guests of the show, and poetry and song recitals performed by acquaintances from across Oakes' theatrical career.
