= Cold Skin =

Cold Skin may refer to:

- Cold Skin (novel), novel by Albert Sánchez Piñol
- Cold Skin (film), 2017 French / Spanish sci-fi horror film based on the novel
- "Cold Skin" (Seven Lions and Echos song), 2016
