= Jess French =

British television personality, veterinarian and author

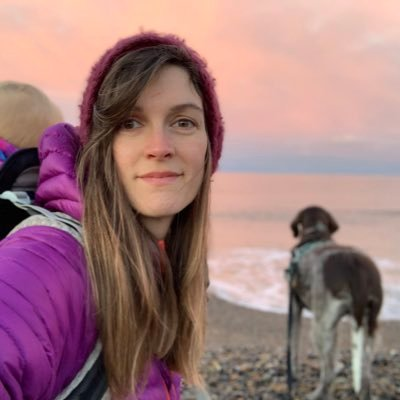
- Education: Norwich School, University College London, University of Nottingham
- Occupations: Television presenter, veterinarian, author
- Notable work: Minibeast Adventure with Jess

Dr Jess French is a British television personality, veterinarian and author. She is the presenter of a television programme called Minibeast Adventure with Jess which has aired on CBeebies. French is also a best-selling children's author and a regular contributor to science, music and literary festivals such as Hay Festival, Edinburgh festival, Cheltenham Science Festival, Bath Festival of Children's Literature, Latitude and Norwich Science Festival, sometimes performing dissections on exotic animal species in front of live audiences. She writes for printed press such as The Guardian, BBC Wildlife, The Week and lectures for universities and institutions including the University of East Anglia and the Royal Institution. She is a patron of Norwich Science Festival and children's ambassador for the Norfolk Wildlife Trust.

== Early life and education ==
French has lived across the world, from Chile to Thailand. She grew up in Norfolk and studied at Norwich School. She gained a first class degree in zoology at University College London where she was active in the volunteering department, winning awards for her work teaching children about conservation and for setting up a sign language society. She has studied primates across the world and has a particular interest in gorillas. She gained her degree in veterinary medicine and surgery from the University of Nottingham and she now works as a small animal and zoo vet. She can speak fluent Spanish and can use British Sign Language.

== TV career ==
French has worked on a number of shows as a wildlife (in particular creepy-crawly) expert including, Live 'n' Deadly (CBBC), Deadly Mission Madagascar (CBBC), Springwatch (BBC) and Micro Monsters 3D (Sky). Since April 2014 she has presented a series of twenty 9-minute episodes of Minibeast Adventure with Jess on the CBeebies channel. She has also appeared on The Pets Factor, BBC Breakfast, Sunday Brunch and Springwatch as well as presenting live lessons for BBC Teach. In December 2022, French appeared alongside Ken Follett, Ria Lina and Susan Collins (artist) on the University Challenge Christmas special, representing University College London.

== Radio ==
French co-presents a radio series with Ben Garrod for BBC Radio 4 called Wild Inside, in which she carries out post mortem examinations on exotic species and discusses her findings. She has also appeared on Saturday Live, the Infinite Monkey Cage,, Evil Genius and a number of other podcasts and radio shows.including Trees A Crowd with David Oakes.

== Books ==
French is one of the UK's top-selling authors of non-fiction books for children. She usually writes on the theme of animals, nature and the environment. In August 2020 she released her debut picture book. Her middle grade fantasy series, Beastlands, was developed into an animated immersive experience at Chester Zoo. She also acts as a judge for book awards such as The Week Junior Book Awards, The Wainwright Prize

French was one of the 2021 World Book Day authors, with her title 'Protect the Planet', published by DK (publisher).

- Fluttering Minibeast Adventures (Feb 2016)
- Tickly Minibeast Adventures (Feb 2016)
- Born Free Chimp Rescue: The True Story of Chinoise (May 2016)
- Born Free Bear Rescue (September 2017)
- Born Free Cheetah Rescue (November 2017)
- Minibeasts with Jess French (February 2018)
- How to Help a Hedgehog and Protect a Polar Bear (Aug 2018)
- Saving Species (October 2018)
- What a Waste (April 2019)
- Lost Species (October 2019)
- The Book of Brilliant Bugs (March 2020)
- Slow Down, Monkey (Aug 2020)
- Let's Save Our Planet: Forests: Uncover the Facts. Be Inspired. Make A Difference (October 2020)
- Protect the Planet – World Book Day book (March 2021)
- Earth's Incredible Oceans (April 2021)
- Cat Chat (July 2021)
- How to Be a Vet and Other Animal Jobs (July 2021)
- Puppy Talk (Jan 2022)
- It's a Wonderful World (March 2022)
- Bella Loves Bugs (April 2022)
- Billy Loves Birds (April 2022)
- My Mum is a Spy – with Andy McNab. (August 2022)
- Pedro Loves Saving the Planet – (April 2023)
- Ava Loves Animals (April 2023)
- Pets and their People: The Ultimate Guide to Caring For Animals - Whether You Have One or Not! (April 2023)
- Beastlands: Race to Frostfall Mountain (Jan 2024)
- The Animal Body Book (June 2024)
- Around the World in 80 Endangered Animals (October 2024)
- Beastlands: Legend of the Crystal Caves (March 2025)
- Bug Snacks: How Eating Insects Can Change the World (May 2025)
- An Anthology of Remarkable Bugs (Sep 2025)
- My Dog (March 2026)
- My Cat (March 2026)

== Awards ==
French won the Jane Goodall Global Youth Leadership award in 2010 for setting up a program to teach children about environmental issues.

In 2015, French was named number 43 on BBC Wildlife magazine's Power List of conservation heroes.

French's book 'Fluttering Minibeast Adventures' was nominated for the 2017 ALCS Educational Writers' Award.

In 2022, French's book 'Earth's Incredible Oceans' won a Gold Nautilus Award and 'It's a Wonderful World' was named 'Top Value Toy' in the 2022 Right Start awards.

In 2025 'The Animal Body Book' was nominated for the Royal Society's Young People's Book Prize 2025.

In 2026, Bug Snacks won the Blueberry Award for middle grade non-fiction.
