= Cold Skin (film) =

2017 horror film

- Theatrical release poster
- Spanish: La piel fría
- Directed by: Xavier Gens
- Written by: Jesús Olmo
- Based on: Cold Skin by Albert Sánchez Piñol
- Produced by: Denise O'Dell; Mark Albela; Denis Pedregosa; Orlando Pedregosa; Frederic Bovis; Lucette Legot; Anna Soler Pont; Ricard Domingo
- Starring: David Oakes; Aura Garrido; Ray Stevenson; John Benfield; Iván González; Winslow Iwaki; William Frater
- Edited by: Guillermo de la Cal
- Music by: Víctor Reyes
- Production companies: Babieka Films; Skin Producciones AIE; Pontas Films; Kanzaman France
- Distributed by: Diamond Films (Spain)
- Release dates: 10 September 2017 (L'Étrange Festival); 20 October 2017 (Spain)
- Running time: 103 min
- Countries: France; Spain
- Language: English
- Box office: $737,478

Cold Skin is a 2017 science fiction-horror film directed by Xavier Gens and based on the 2002 novel of the same name by Albert Sánchez Piñol. The film was released on 20 October 2017 in Spain.

== Plot ==
In 1914, a young Irishman travels to a remote South Atlantic island to work as a weather observer. The only other inhabitant of the island is Gruner, the caretaker of the crudely fortified lighthouse. Gruner says the previous observer died from typhus and there is no body.

Exploring the island, the unnamed man finds his predecessor's diary with drawings of strange sea creatures. At night, his cabin is besieged by those creatures. The next night, he lights a fire to repel the creatures, only to burn down his cabin. The next day, he discovers a female amphibious creature outside. Gruner prevents him from shooting her and shows that she is "tame". Calling the man "Friend," Gruner explains the creature will not leave her master no matter how cruel he is.

Friend successfully bribes Gruner into letting him stay in the lighthouse. That night, creatures climb the lighthouse, and Gruner butchers them as Friend faints. While defending the lighthouse the following night, Gruner locks Friend outside on the balcony to fight alone, essentially leaving him to die. In the morning, Gruner discovers Friend covered in creature blood but still alive.

The two men settle into a routine. Friend grows to like the captive female creature (treated as a sex slave by Gruner) and names her Aneris. Friend speculates the nightly attacks are attempts to reclaim Aneris, who sings during the lighthouse attacks. Gruner belittles Friend's ideas.

One night, the duo come perilously close to being killed when the lighthouse is overrun by the creatures. The following day, Friend tries to signal a passing ship. Gruner attacks Friend and the two men wrestle for control of the flare gun. Aneris tries to protect Friend. Gruner explains to Friend his reasoning for refusing any rescue.

Friend communicates to Aneris his desire to leave the island. She leads him to an abandoned rowing boat. Friend and Gruner devise a plan to salvage dynamite from a sunken ship just off shore. The two men row the boat to the shipwreck. Friend dons an old diving suit and jumps in, retrieving several boxes of dynamite. Gruner does not pull up Friend and stops pumping air to him. Friend escapes from the dive suit and climbs back aboard the row boat, aware that Gruner had once again tried to kill him. Back at the lighthouse, they discover that the recovered dynamite is dry enough to use.

Friend and Gruner form a plan to lure as many sea creatures to the lighthouse as possible before setting off the dynamite, believing that the show of force will kill many and drive them off. The plan largely succeeds, leaving many of the creatures dead or dying. In the morning, Gruner finishes off the remaining creatures. Friend removes a necklace from the neck of one of the dead creatures and once again tries to convince Gruner that the creatures are more civilized than Gruner believes.

Later that evening, Gruner reveals that he found Aneris trapped in his net in the sea and freed her from it. The following night the creatures do not attack, and a great wailing sound comes from the sea. Aneris is missing and appears to have run off for the first time. While Gruner sleeps, Friend discovers a photo of Gruner as a young man with a wife. Friend recognizes the woman in the picture as the same one in a photo belonging to his predecessor.

Friend leaves a present for the creatures. He discovers a child creature investigating his present. A more confident Aneris re-appears. Friend tries to tell Gruner that the creatures want a truce. Gruner commands Aneris to return to him but she refuses. Gruner retreats back to the lighthouse where he fires a flare that kills the child creature. Friend finds Gruner inside the lighthouse and the two men fight. Friend tells Gruner he knows he is the previous weather observer and asks him to remember love. Gruner drops his axe, exits the lighthouse, and is killed by the awaiting mob of sea creatures.

Many months later, the next ship arrives to replace Friend. The captain tells Friend they are there to replace the weather observer. Friend tells the captain the weather observer died from typhus, echoing the same lie he was told upon arrival. Aneris watches from a distance before leaping into the sea and swimming away.

== Cast ==
- Ray Stevenson as Gruner, Aldor Vigeland
- David Oakes as Friend
- Aura Garrido as Aneris
- John Benfield as Captain Axel
- Iván González as Weather Official
- Winslow Iwaki as Senegalese sailor
- Ben Temple as Ship Official
- William Frater as Fishman

== Production ==
Cold Skin was produced by Babieka Films and Skin Producciones AIE alongside Pontas Films and Kanzaman France with the participation of RTVE and TV3 and backing from ICAA and ICEC. The sets were designed by Gil Parrondo, to whom the film is dedicated.

== Release ==
The film was released theatrically in Spain by Diamond Films on 20 October 2017. Samuel Goldwyn Films released the film in the United States.

== Reception ==
Cold Skin has grossed a worldwide total of $737,478. On review aggregator Rotten Tomatoes, the film holds an approval rating of 48% based on 27 reviews, and an average rating of 6.10/10. The website's critical consensus reads, "Cold Skin exerts a strong visual pull, even if all that icy atmosphere isn't a truly satisfying substitute for a story that dares to go somewhere different."

David Ehrlich of IndieWire gave the film a 'C+' rating, deeming it to be "a gruesome but uncommonly philosophical creature feature" hinting at "a Lovecraftian ambition that it never fully assumes for itself".

Dennis Harvey of Variety assessed that the film "offers a good-looking and well-crafted if familiar chunk of creature-siege horror".

== See also ==
- List of Spanish films of 2017
