= Thompson Island (South Atlantic) =

Phantom island in the South Atlantic

Coordinates: 53°56′S 5°30′E

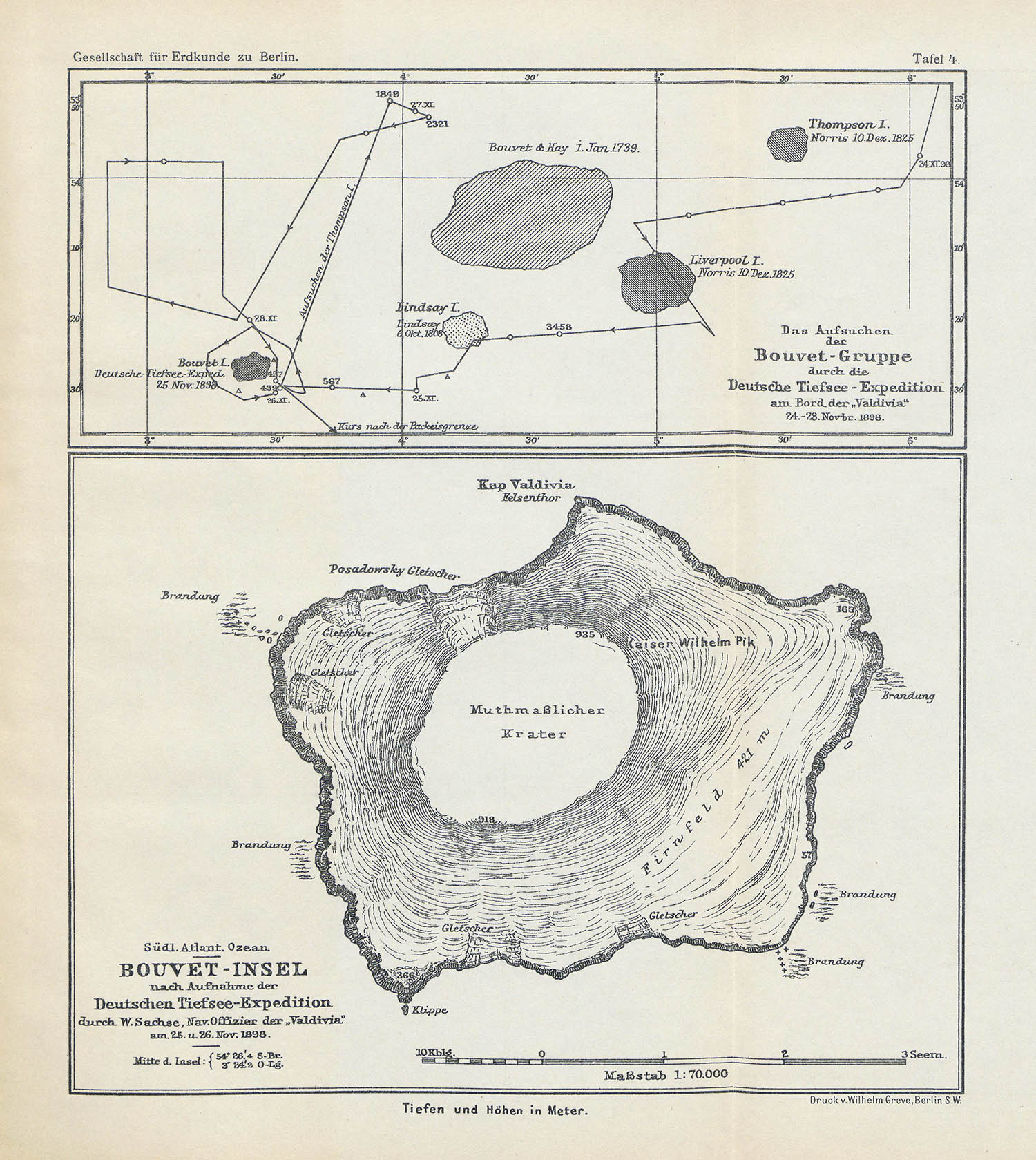
1898 German map of Bouvet Island, with Thompson I.

Supposed location of Thompson Island on a map of the Atlantic Ocean.

Thompson Island was a phantom island in the South Atlantic. It was thought to be about 70 km (43 mi; 38 nmi) north-northeast of Bouvet Island, a small Norwegian dependency between South Africa and Antarctica.

== History ==
The island was first reported and named by whaling ship captain George Norris in 1825, supposedly the same day as sighting and landing on Bouvet Island, erroneously thinking the island to be undiscovered and naming it Liverpool Island. The last reported sighting was in 1893. When, however, the German survey ship Valdivia fixed the position of Bouvet in 1898, it then looked for Thompson, but did not find it. If Thompson ever existed, it is probable that it disappeared in a volcanic eruption sometime in the 1890s, although in 1997 it was reported that the sea depth at the supposed location is greater than 2,400 metres (7,900 ft; 1.5 mi), rendering the existence of a submarine volcano all but impossible.

Thompson Island continued to appear on maps published as late as 1943.

== In fiction ==
- The climax of Geoffrey Jenkins' 1962 novel A Grue of Ice is set on Thompson Island. The author places the island 120 km (75 mi; 65 nmi) south-southeast of Bouvet Island, explaining the position discrepancy by means of light refraction in Antarctic waters.
- Thompson Island inspired the scenario for the 2002 novel La pell freda (Cold Skin) by Catalan writer Albert Sánchez Piñol.

== See also ==
- Saxemberg Island
- St. Matthew Island (phantom island)
