= Beccy =

Beccy may refer to:

- Beccy Cole (born 1972), musical artist
- Beccy Cooper, British politician
- Beccy Gordon (born 1978), American racing driver
- Beccy Huxtable (born 1981), British radio personality and producer
- Beccy Speight, chief executive officer in the conservation charity sector
