= Beth Armstrong =

Beth Armstrong may refer to:

- Beth Armstrong (Home and Away)
- Beth Diane Armstrong (born 1985), South African sculptor
