= Moshe Shachak =

Moshe Shachak (Hebrew: משה שחק; born Moshe Charshak; 1936) is an ecologist at the Ben Gurion University. Shachak’s research focuses on ecosystem engineers, organisms that modulate the abiotic environment. Most of his studies were conducted in arid and semi arid ecosystems.

== Major contributions ==
Shachak was born in Jaffa, Palestine. In his early career, he studied desert animals and eco-hydrological processes in small desert watershed. Together with colleges he showed that herbivory of snails on cyanobacteria living inside rocks has major impacts of weathering of that rocky desert. This effect was found to be similar in magnitude to aeolian deposition in that area. A follow-up study showed that this herbivory has a fertilization effect which is about 11% of the nitrogen input in that system. These findings, led to the development of the concept of ecosystem engineers together with Clive Jones and John Lawton. Ecosystem engineers are organisms that change the environment thereby affecting the distribution of many other organisms. Although controversial at the beginning, this concept had become widely accepted. One of the original papers was named in the list of the 100 most influential papers in ecology and today the concept appears in mainstream ecological textbooks. Shachak’s more recent research focuses on plants and cyanobacteria engineers and pattern formation.
