= John Lawton (biologist) =

British ecologist (born 1943)

Sir John Lawton CBE FRS
- Born: John Hartley Lawton; 24 September 1943 (age 82); Preston, Lancashire, England
- Education: University of Durham
- Awards: Kempe Award for Distinguished Ecologists (1998); Frink Medal (1998); Marsh Ecology Award (1996); Japan Prize (2004); RSPB Medal
- Scientific career
- Fields: Zoology; Ecology
- Workplaces: University of York; York Museums Trust

Sir John Hartley Lawton CBE FRS (born 24 September 1943) is a British ecologist, RSPB Vice President, President (former Chair) of the Yorkshire Wildlife Trust, President of The Institution of Environmental Sciences, Chairman of York Museums Trust and President of the York Ornithological Club.

He has previously been a trustee of WWF UK and head of Natural Environment Research Council (NERC) and was the last chair of the Royal Commission on Environmental Pollution. In October 2011, he was awarded the RSPB Medal.

== Early life ==
As a child, Lawton was a member of the Young Ornithologists' Club, and later helped run the RSPB Members' Group in York. In his youth, he volunteered for the RSPB's Operation Osprey at Loch Garten.

== Career ==
Lawton studied at the University of Durham, completing a Bachelor of Science in Zoology followed by a PhD in 1969. He belonged to University College. Lawton was Demonstrator in Ecology in the Department of Zoology at the University of Oxford from 1968, moving to the Department of Biology, University of York, in 1971. He was awarded a Personal Chair at York in 1985. He founded, and was the first Director of, the NERC Centre for Population Biology at Imperial College, Silwood Park.

In 1994, he gave the Witherby Memorial Lecture on 'Numbers and range in the field and in the mind'.

In October 1999, he was appointed the Chief Executive of NERC, retaining an honorary professorship at Imperial College of Science, Technology and Medicine. Following his retirement from NERC in March 2005, he was appointed Chairman of the Royal Commission on Environment Pollution from 1 April 2005, and was reappointed for a second three-year term in 2008.

His interests have focused on the population dynamics and biodiversity of birds and insects, with emphasis over the last decade on the impacts of global environmental change on wild plants and animals. He was instrumental in establishing The Royal Society for the Protection of Bird's strategy for protecting landscapes. He has made major contributions to environmental NGOs, including a five-year period as Chairman of the Royal Society for the Protection of Birds and a trustee of WWF-UK.

He shared the Japan Prize for Science and Technology for Conservation of Biodiversity in 2004 "for observational, experimental and theoretical achievements for the scientific understanding and conservation of Biodiversity".

In 2009 he published an official review of the Meteorological Office's Hadley Centre.

In 2010 he reported an official review of England's protected areas, published as Making Space for Nature.

Lawton has been outspoken on the issue of global warming and is reported to have said, in the context of Hurricane Katrina:

The increased intensity of these kinds of extreme storms is very likely to be due to global warming… If this makes the climate loonies in the States realize we've got a problem, some good will come out of a truly awful situation.

On 2 November 2019, he appeared on the podcast Trees A Crowd with David Oakes.

== Honours and awards ==
- President's Gold Medal of the British Ecological Society (1987)
- CBE (1997)
- Japan Prize (2004)
- Knight Bachelor (2005)
- Ramon Margalef Prize in Ecology (2006)
- Foreign Associate, US National Academy of Sciences (2008)
- Foreign Honorary Member, American Academy of Arts and Sciences (2008)
- RSPB Medal (2011)
- CIEEM Medal (2017)
