= Beth Diane Armstrong =

South African sculptor

- Born: 1985 (age 40–41); Nelspruit, South Africa
- Education: Rhodes University
- Known for: Sculpture

Beth Diane Armstrong (born 1985) is a South African sculptor. Her skills, ambitious scale and large projects have allowed her to assume the role and position alongside many of her South African male counterparts. For the last number of years she has worked predominantly on monumental artworks made of mild and stainless steel but there are a variety of different materials to her repertoire: other sculpting media as well as printmaking, video, photography, drawing and installations.

== Biography ==
Born in South Africa in 1985, Armstrong lives and works in Johannesburg. In 2010, she completed her Masters of Fine Art at Rhodes University. In 2007 Rhodes bought her BFA exhibition, Hibernation, for their permanent collection. Since graduating there have been solo exhibitions, a number of group shows and projects locally and internationally, as well as private and public commissions. Recent highlights include sculptures at the Design Miami/Basel design fair in Basel, Switzerland, and at Design Miami, Florida – both in 2014. 2014 also saw the completion of a large permanent public artwork in Oostvoorne, in the Netherlands, commissioned by the Kern Kunst Westvoorne Foundation. Her first large-scale sculpture was bought by Standard Bank in 2013 and is installed in their new building in Rosebank, Johannesburg. Armstrong currently lives and works in Johannesburg.

== Recent developments ==
Armstrong was selected to create sculptures for a 2011 campaign by investment management firm Prescient.

Armstrong was one of 33 artists selected for Worldforall's Not All is Black and White: Wisdom from the African Zebra campaign, which ran concurrently to the 2010 FIFA World Cup.

Armstrong partook in Design Miami/ Basel, with Southern Guild, Miami, Florida, USA in 2014. She also completed the Flagpole Sculpture Commission for Kern Kunst Westvoorne Foundation, the Netherlands.

Armstrong contributed to A Place in Time in association with the Yorkshire Sculpture Park UK, curated by Helen Pheby, NIROX Sculpture Park, Johannesburg, South Africa in 2016.

Page – a site specific public sculpture in Grahamstown's newly built NELM (National English Literary Museum) was unveiled in late 2016.

Armstrong was awarded the 2017 Standard Bank Young Artist for Visual Art, which gave her a solo exhibition at Grahams town Festival in June 2017, followed by a tour of the same body of work to various museums around the country into 2018.

== Reception ==
Grace O’Malley noted in a review for Artthrob, that Armstrong’s work "offered a multifaceted intellectual examination of human psychology through line and space". Ashraf Jamal, in a piece on Armstrong for Art South Africa’s "Bright Young Things", states that "Armstrong’s warping of the sculpture paradigm makes way for new applications and new figurations in a genre caught in the tedious warp of thingness"; later stating that Armstrong introduces not only a new philosophy of making and meaning, but its solution".
