= St. Matthew Island (phantom island) =

Phantom Island

Alleged location of St. Matthew Island in the Atlantic Ocean

St Matthew Island (French: Île Saint-Mathieu) is a phantom island once thought to lie roughly one thousand kilometers northeast of Ascension Island in the Atlantic Ocean. It appeared on navigational charts until as late as the early twentieth century. It was supposedly located at approximately 2°S 8°W, and was alleged to have been discovered by the Portuguese on St. Matthew's Day 1516. It was shown and named on several maps going back to the beginning of the sixteenth century, and it was supposedly visited by García Jofre de Loaísa on 20 October 1525 while on a voyage to the Moluccas. It appeared on early Portuguese charts and world maps, and appears on Ortelius' 1570 map of the African continent Africae Tabula Nova. It thereafter regularly featured on charts and maps, and though it began to disappear from standard charts starting in the early nineteenth century, it was not completely removed from charts until the early twentieth century.

Peter Mundy refers in 1656 to St Matthew Island when writing about Ascension, with some words changed to be more understandable in brackets:

[So] now [again] concerning the Ascention birds [also], [that] can neither fly nor [swim]. The [island] [being] [about] 300 leagues from the coast of [Guinea] and 160 leagues from the [island] of St Matheo, the nearest land to it, the question is, how they [should] [be] generated, [whether] created there from the beginning, or [that] the earth [produce] them of its [own] accord, as mice, [serpents], flies, [worms], etts, insects, or [whether] the nature of the earth and climate have [altered] the [shape] and nature of some other [foul] into this, I leave it to the learned to dispute of.

— Peter Mundy, The Travels of Peter Mundy

Captain James Cook tried but failed to find St. Matthew in 1775 during his second voyage.

Both Peter Leonard (1833) and H.C. Adams (1883) suggest that the error may have arisen from a confusion with Annobón Island, which lies at the same latitude but at 5°38′E longitude.

== Gallery ==
Ortelius' 1570 "Africae Tabula Nova" showing "S. Matheo"

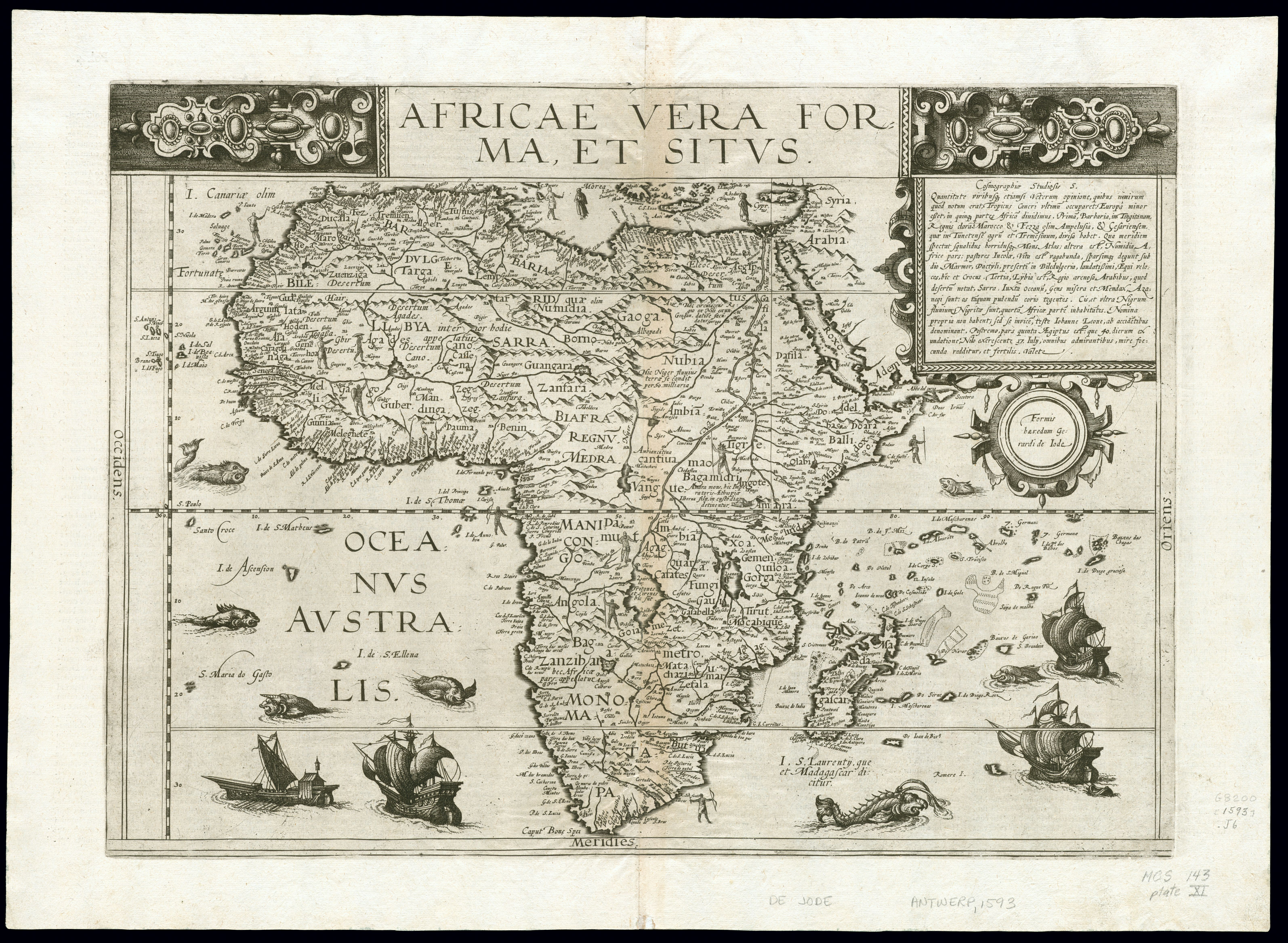
Gerard de Jode's 1593 map showing "I.de S.Matheus"

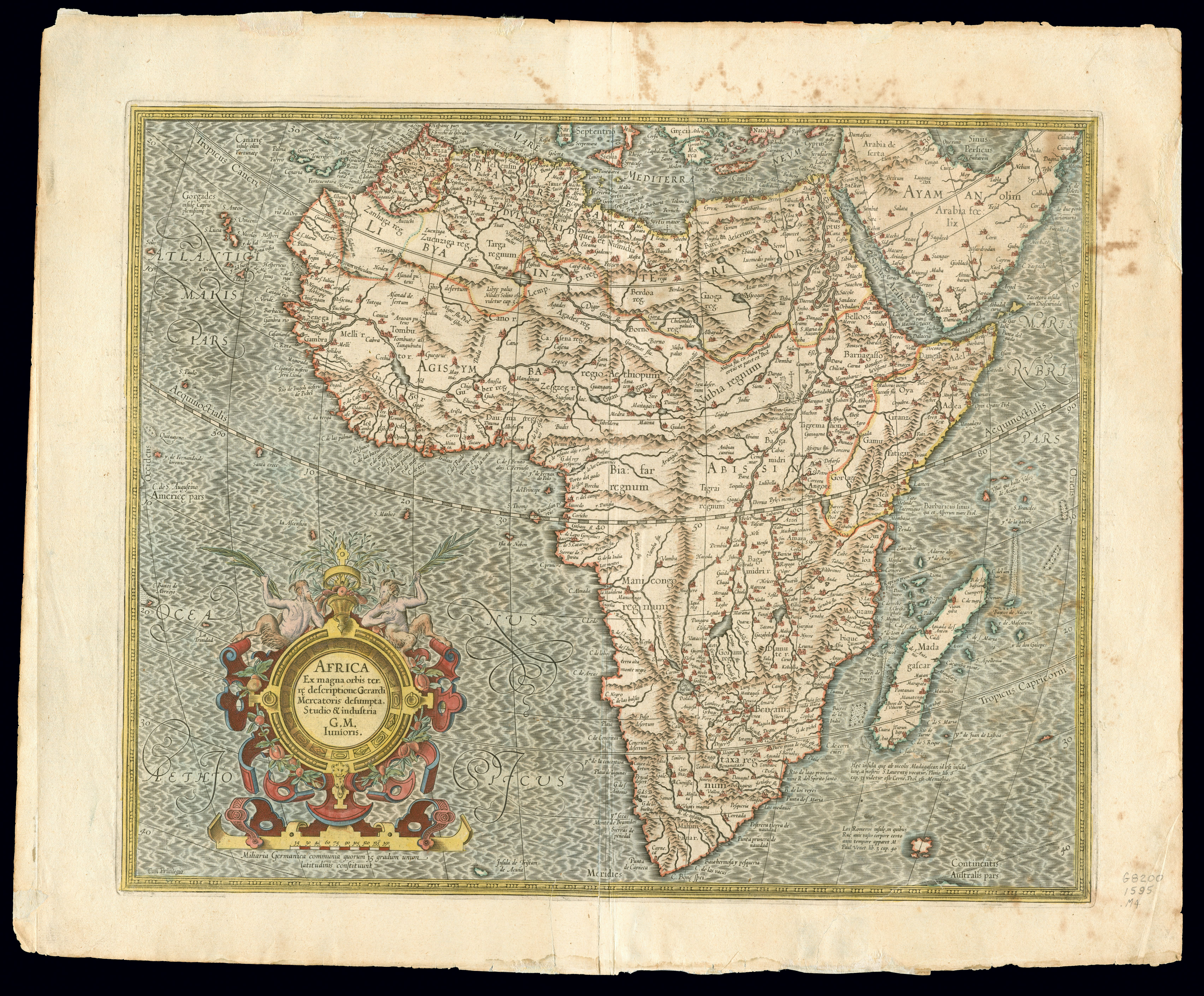
Gerardus Mercator's 1595 map from the Atlas sive Cosmographicae meditationes de fabrica mvndi et fabricati figvra showing "S. Matheo"

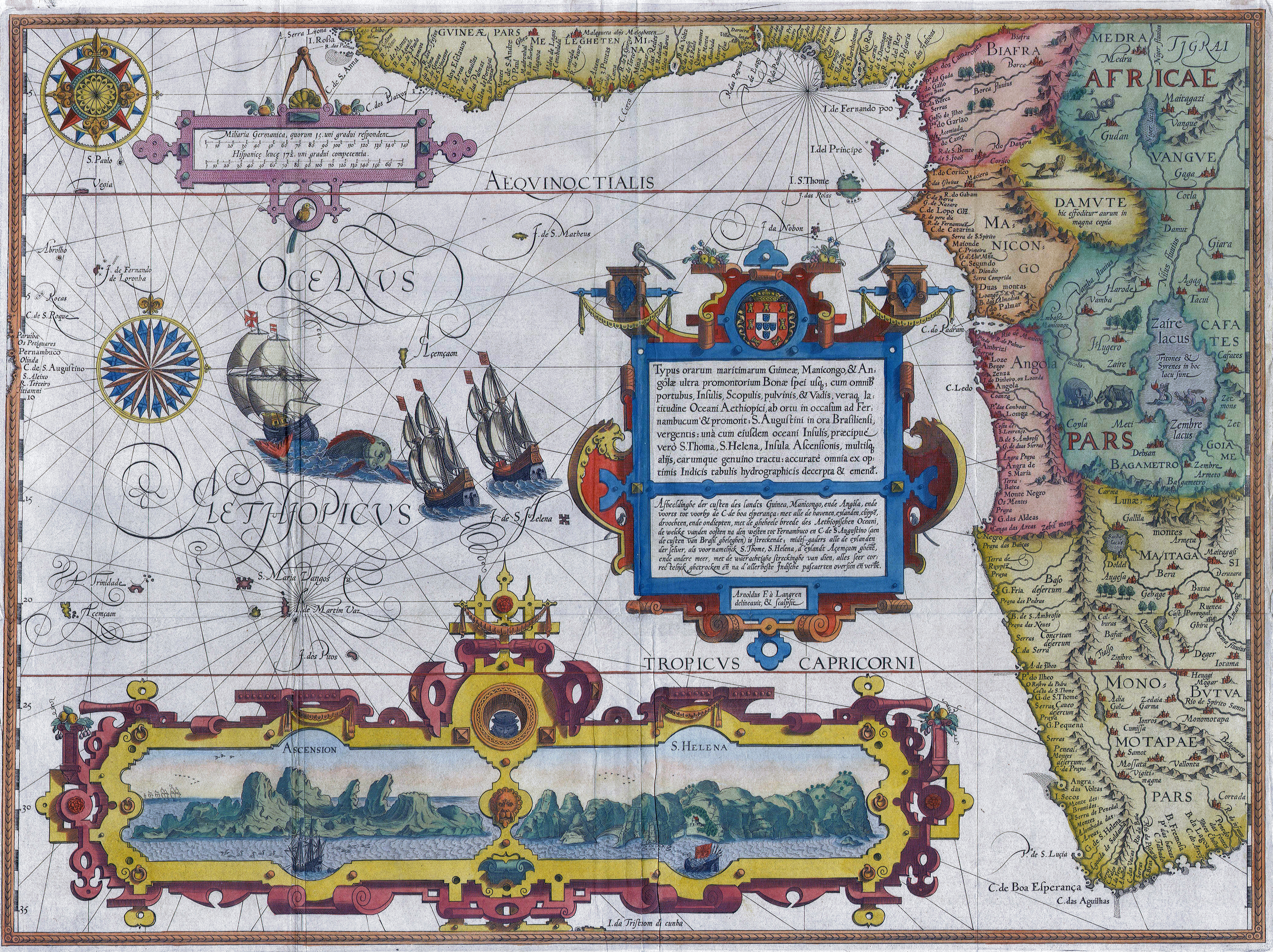
Jan Huygen van Linschoten's 1596 map showing "I. de S. Matheus"

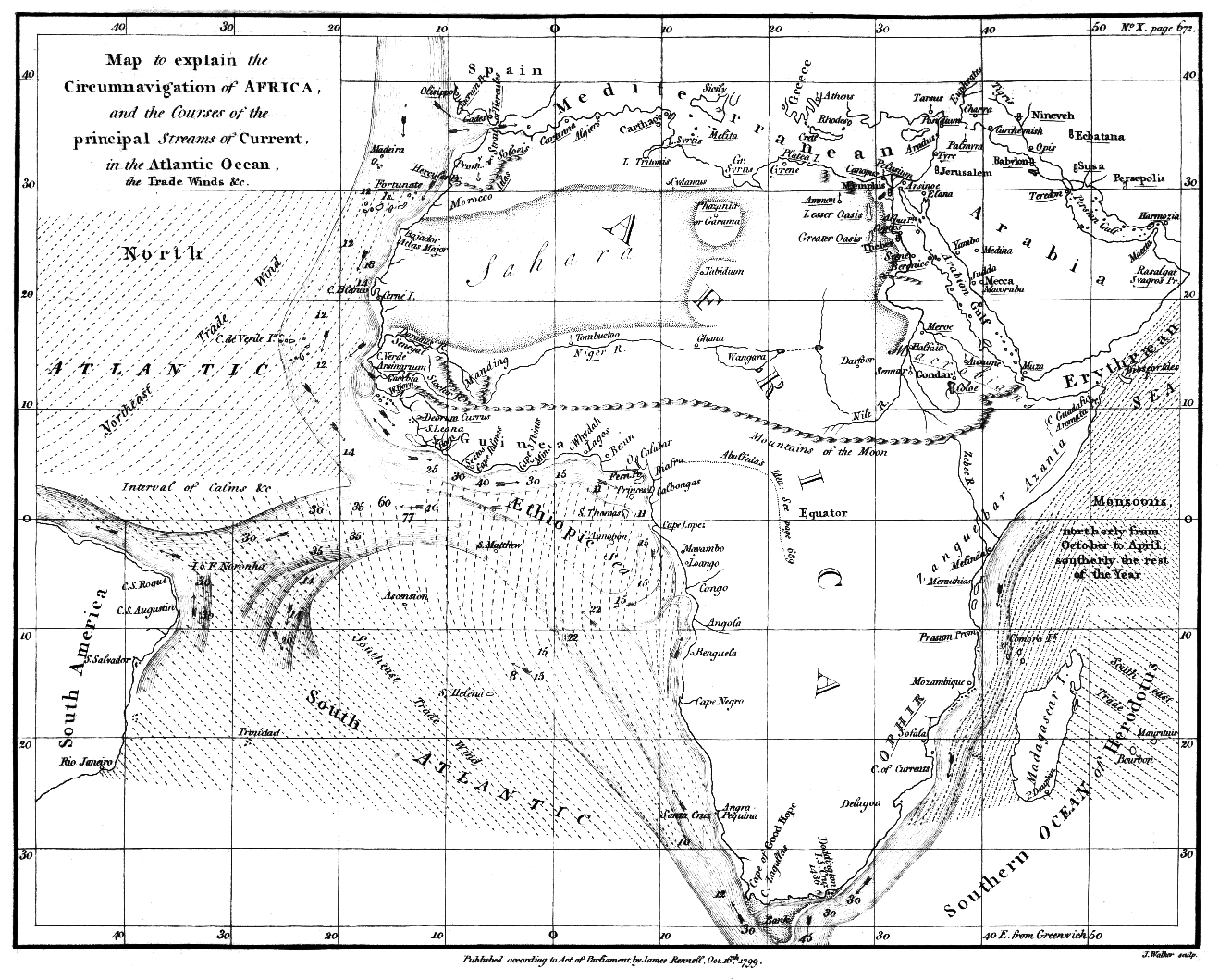
James Rennel's 1799 map showing "S. Matthew"

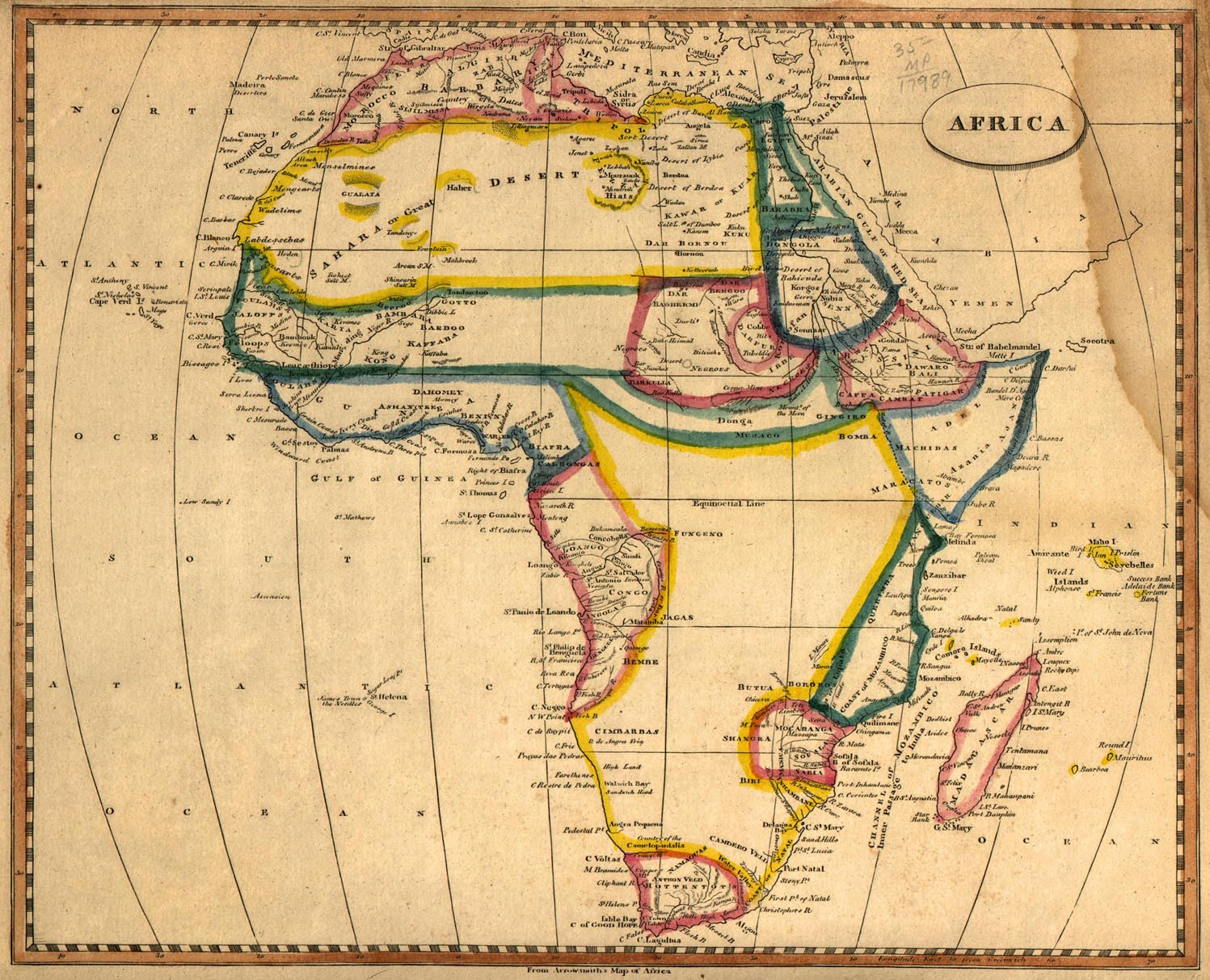
Arrowsmith and Lewis 1812 map showing "St. Mathew"

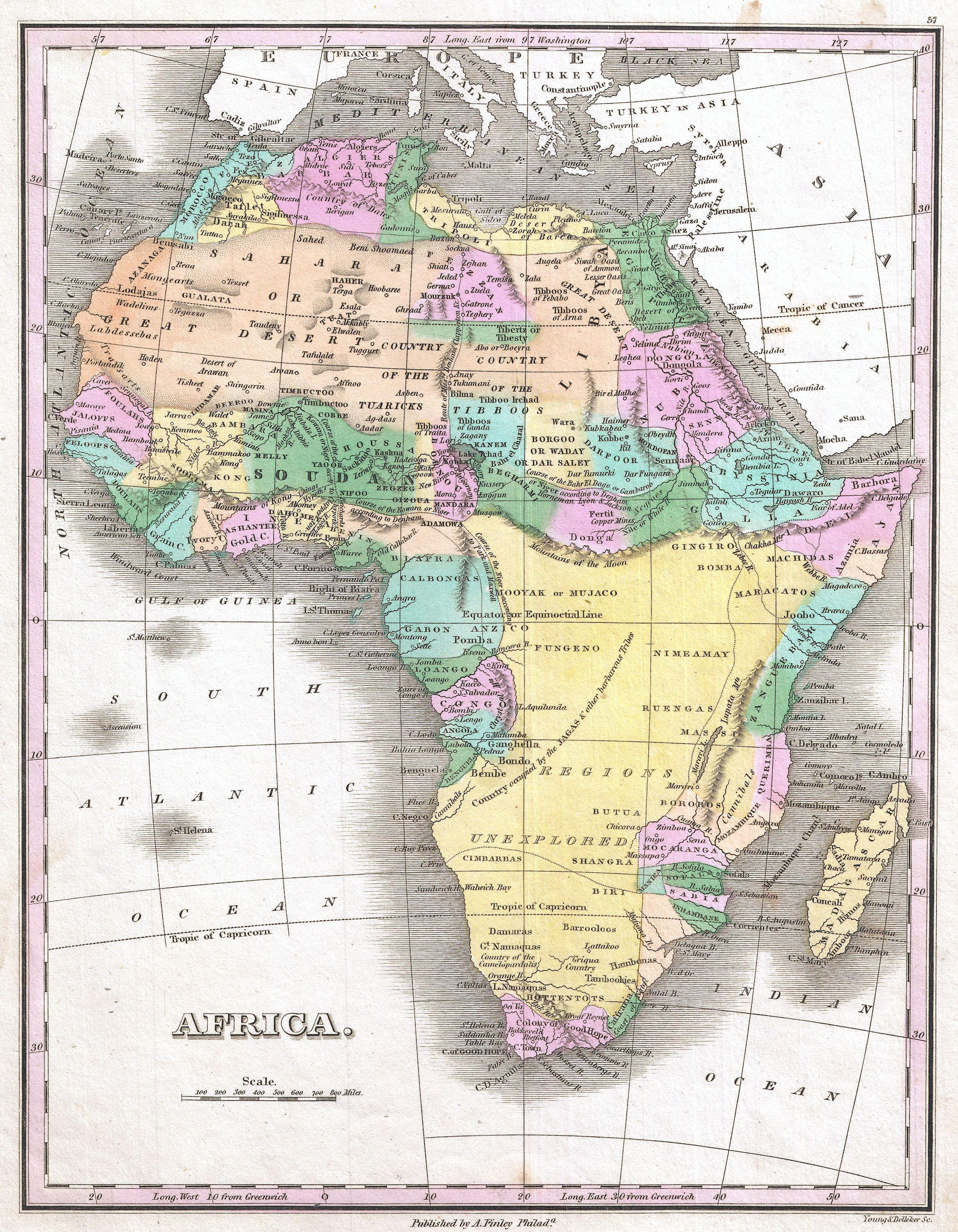
1827 map by Anthony Finley showing "S. Matthew"

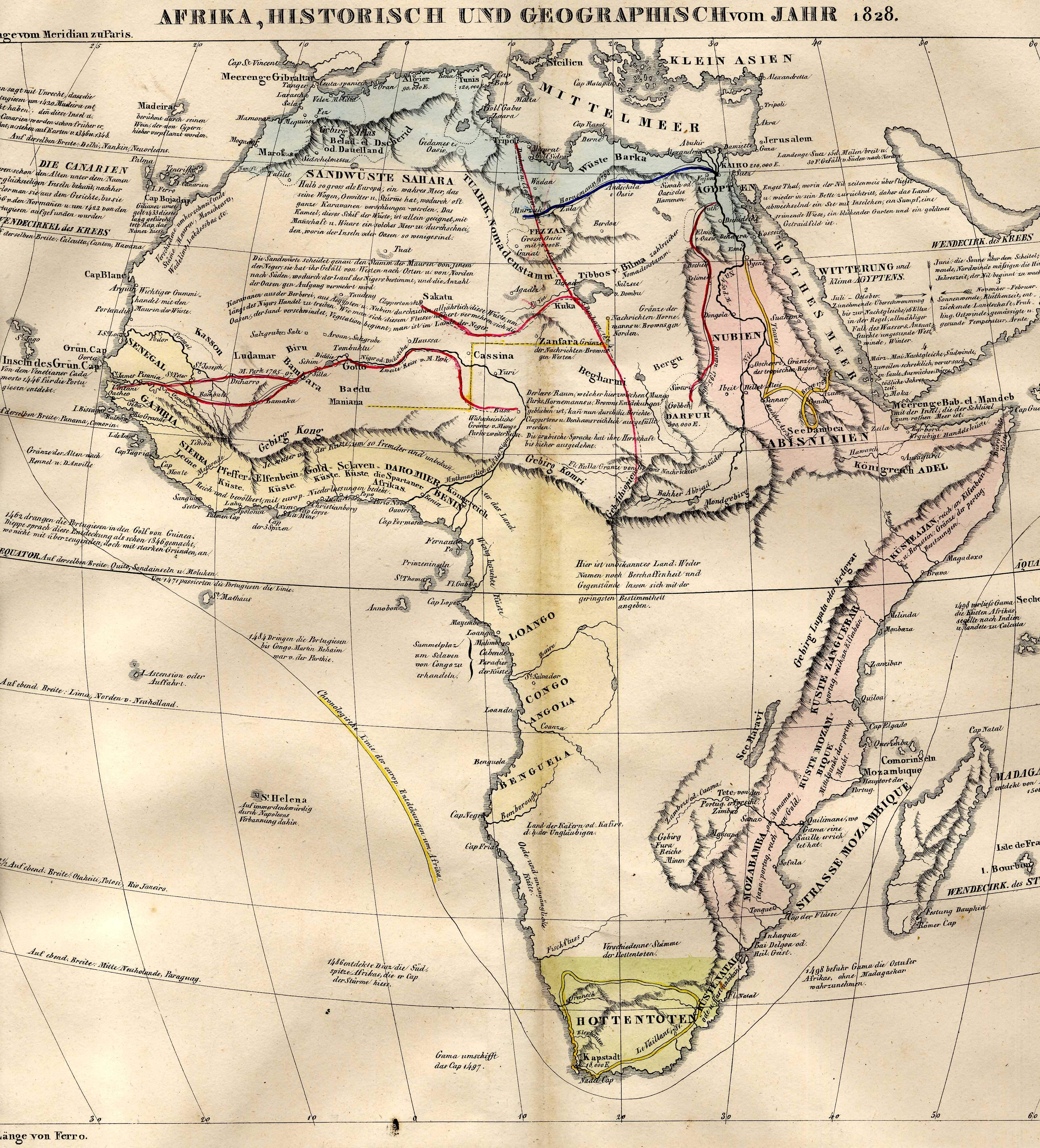
1828 German map showing "St. Mathäus"

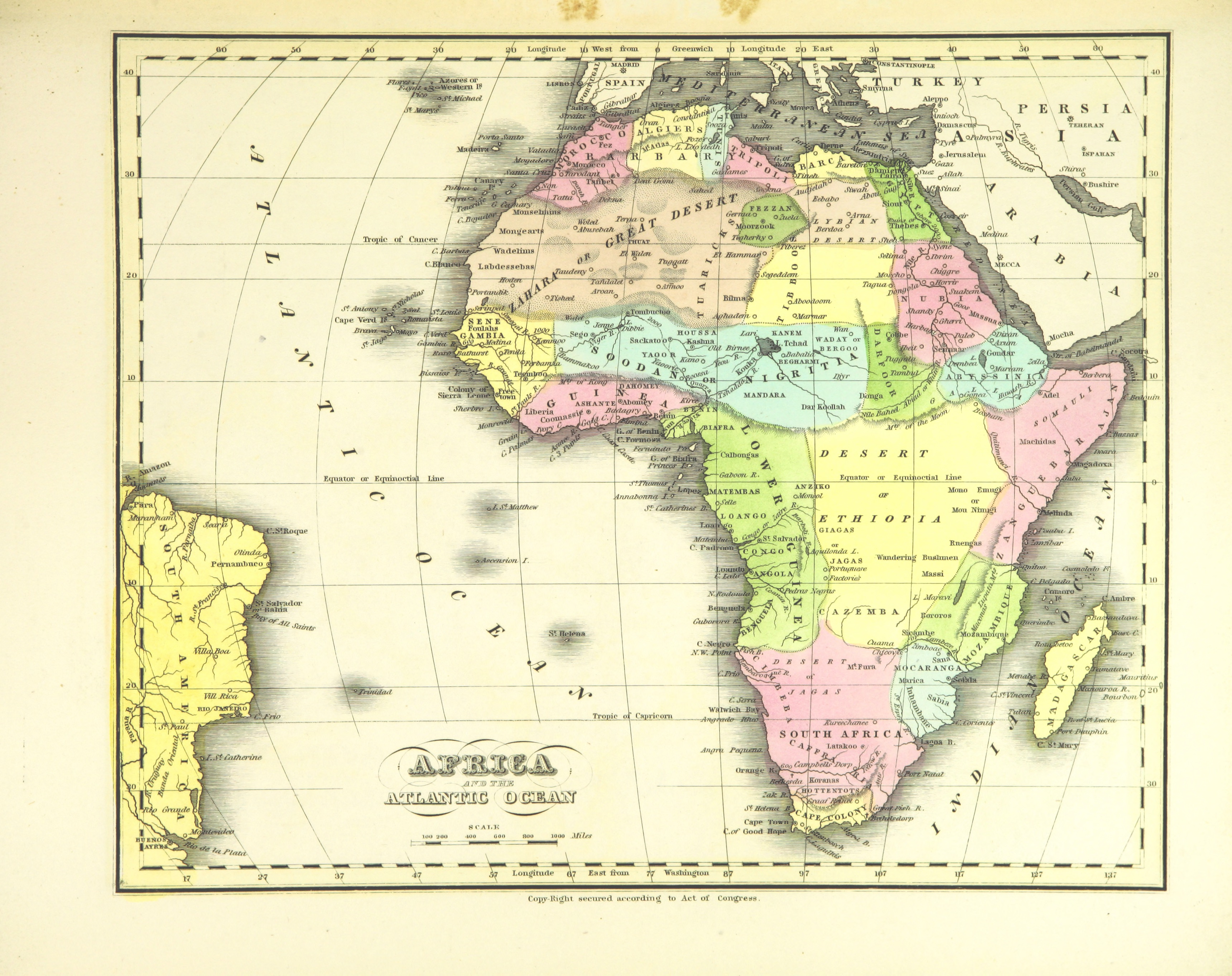
1836 Atlas showing "I. St. Matthew"

== See also ==
- Saxemberg Island
- Thompson Island (South Atlantic)
