= Saxemberg Island =

Phantom island of the South Atlantic

Alleged location of Saxemberg Island in the Atlantic Ocean

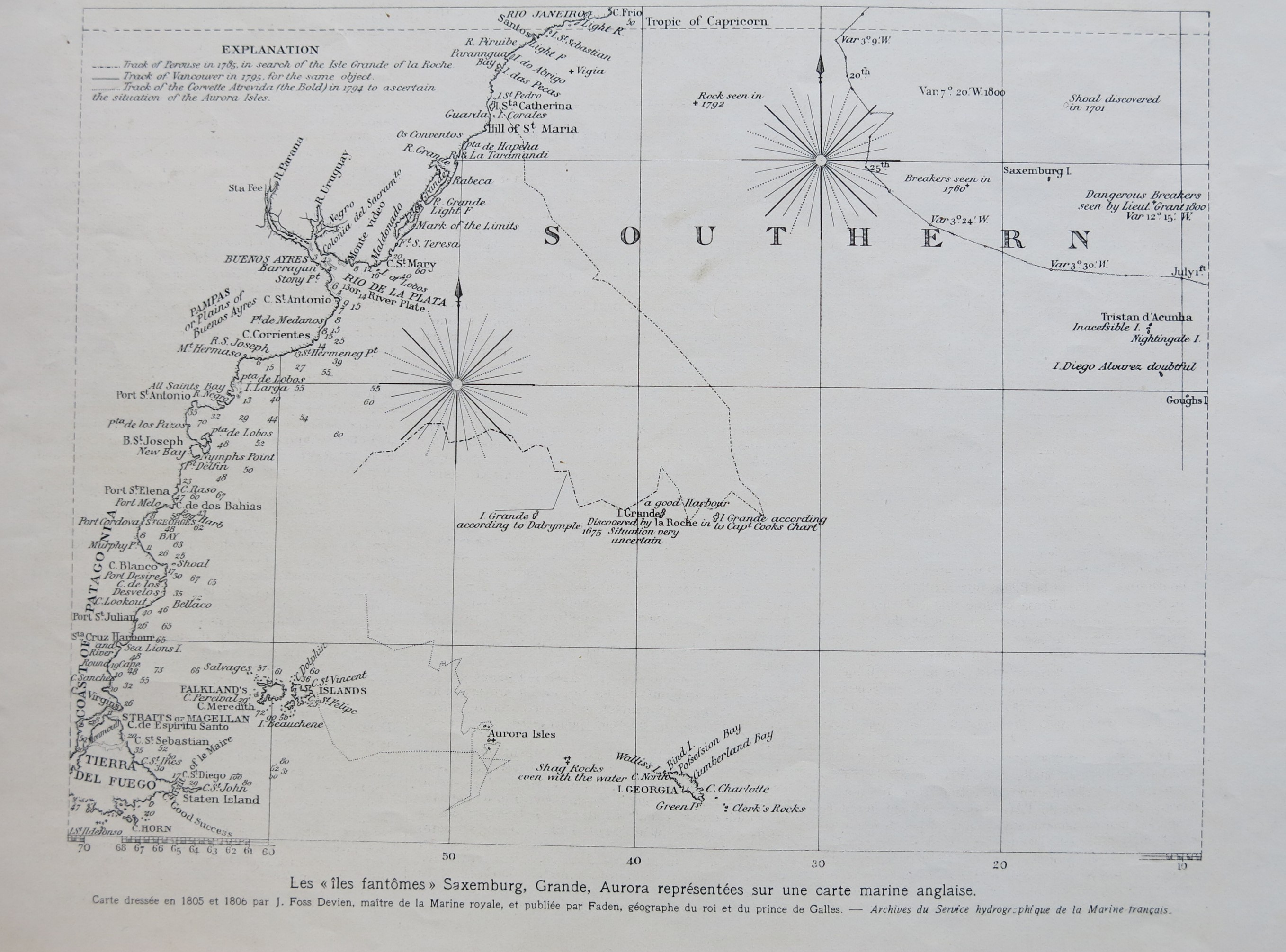
Phantom islands in the South Atlantic—including Saxemberg—on a map from 1805/1806

Saxemberg or Saxemburg Island was a phantom island believed to have existed in the South Atlantic. It appeared intermittently on charts between the 17th and the 19th centuries.

Saxemberg was reportedly discovered by Dutch seafarer John Lindestz Lindeman in 1670. Lindeman reported the island's coordinates as 30°45′S 19°40′W. Lindeman made a sketch which depicted the island as being low lying, but with a somewhat pointed mountain in the middle. Other sketches, of unidentified authorship, presented a more detailed view of Saxemberg. Major General Alexander Beatson, a resident of St. Helena, reported that he had drawings of the island depicting different forms of plant life. Another resident of St Helena, James Wathen, wrote a book where he surmised that Ascension, Tristan da Cunha, Gough, and Saxemberg constituted an island chain extending 1,800 miles (2,900 km) in length and 500 miles (800 km) in breadth.

Despite Lindeman's original report, many sailors were apparently unable to locate the island at the coordinates provided by the Dutchman. There appears to have been some skepticism about the existence of Saxemberg, and the island was not always depicted on charts. The next reported sighting of Saxemberg was made in 1804, when Captain Galloway of the American ship Fanny reported seeing the island and keeping it in view for four hours. Galloway observed that the island did indeed have a peak in the middle, as reported by Lindeman. In 1816, Captain Head of the True Briton found the island and kept it in view for six hours. His account corroborated Galloway's.

The British explorer Matthew Flinders, known for his explorations of Australia, attempted to find Saxemberg during his cruise on the ship Investigator, in September 1801. Flinders concluded in his book, A Voyage to Terra Australis, that he did not believe Saxemberg existed at all. However, he noted sometime later that he met the Earl of Caledon in 1810, who showed Flinders a log extract from Captain Long of the sloop Columbus. The log, dated 22 September 1809, noted:

Five p.m., saw the island of Saxonburg (Saxemberg), bearing E. S. E., first about 41 leagues distant: clear weather. Steered for the said island, and found it to be in the latitude of 30° 18' south, longitude 28° 20' west, or thereabout.

The island of Saxonburg is about four leagues in length, N. W. and S. E., and about 2½ miles in breadth. The N. W. end is a high bluff of about 70 feet, perpendicular form, and runs along to the south-east about 8 miles. You will see trees at about a mile and a half distance, and a sandy beach.

The situation of Saxemberg in the common tables and charts, was 30° 45' south and 19° 40' west, almost 9° of longitude too little; and therefore it is not surprising that ships have missed it. At the time so many birds were seen, on the 28th, the Investigator was not more than eighty miles from the position of the island, as above given from Mr. Long.

None of the captains who reported seeing Saxemberg actually landed.

== See also ==
- St. Matthew Island (phantom island)
- Thompson Island (South Atlantic)

== Sources ==
- Ramsay, Raymond H. No Longer on the Map. Discovering Places That Never Were. New York: Viking, 1972. ISBN 0-670-51433-0.
- Stommel, Henry (1984). Lost Islands: The Story of Islands That Have Vanished from Nautical Charts. Vancouver: University of British Columbia Press, pp 22–25. ISBN 0-7748-0210-3.
