= The Fitzrovia Radio Hour =

British comedy troupe

The Fitzrovia Radio Hour are a group of British comedy writer/performers, formed in 2008 and consisting of Jon Edgley Bond, Alix Dunmore, Alex Ratcliffe, Phil Mulryne, Tom Mallaburn and Martin Pengelly.

== Concept ==
The Fitzrovia Radio Hour conceive, write and perform theatrical radio plays in the 1940s style. The plays are performed in evening dress, behind period microphones and with sound effects produced live. An hour-long show usually contains three stories – typically in genres such as horror, adventure, science fiction and romance – interspersed with advertisements for products such as whisky, cigarettes and stout. Popular characters include Leinigen, a fearless explorer; Squadron Leader Edward Templar, an intrepid RAF pilot; Professor Quested, an investigator of the unusual; and Frank Maskill, a Leeds lathe worker who should have known his place.

== History ==
The Fitzrovia Radio Hour formed in January 2008. The founding members were Jon Edgley Bond, Alix Dunmore, Alex Ratcliffe and Callum Coates. Phil Mulryne and Tom Mallaburn also appeared in the first series of shows.

The Fitzrovia Radio Hour has featured a number of guest actors, including Fiona Sheehan, Laura Carmichael, Esther Biddle, Nick Atkinson, Asa Joel, Chris Gilling, David Oakes and Dan Starkey.

== Shows ==
=== Series 1-3 ===
The first six performances took place at Bourne & Hollingsworth, a cellar bar located in the Fitzrovia area of central London. For these shows original broadcast scripts from the 1940s were sourced and edited. Guest directors included Phoebe Barran and Miles Gregory. A dedicated sound man was often employed for the production of sound effects.

In October 2008 the Fitzrovia Radio Hour performed their first show at the Swan, the bar and brasserie at Shakespeare's Globe Theatre. It featured 'Rex Boothroyd: For King & Country', a spy story by Tom Mallaburn and Martin Pengelly, who subsequently joined the group, and Phil Mulryne's adaptation of 'The Suicide Club' by Robert Louis Stevenson. Top Shelf Jazz provided post-show music. The show remained at the Swan for six free monthly performances.

In May 2009 the Fitzrovia Radio Hour performed their first show at the UnderGlobe, the 400-capacity space under Shakespeare's Globe Theatre. The show, entitled 'Tales of Speed & Time' featured 'The Man Who Was Ten Minutes Late' by Tom Mallaburn and Martin Pengelly, 'The Queen of Nimruth' by Phil Mulryne and a four-minute adaptation of Arthur Conan Doyle's 'Sherlock Holmes & the Adventure of the Norwood Builder' written by Alex Ratcliffe. Post-show music was supplied by Marmaduke Dando. In 2009 the Fitzrovia Radio Hour performed seven monthly shows at the UnderGlobe, including a Halloween Special in October and finishing with a Christmas Special in December 2009. Top Shelf Jazz, The Correspondents, Trio Manouche and The Jive Aces provided live music.

=== London Runs ===
From Saturday 30 January to Saturday 6 March 2010, the Fitzrovia Radio Hour performed a five-week run at the Last Days of Decadence in Shoreditch and the Swan at Shakespeare’s Globe on Bankside. The run consisted of three shows, performed in rotation. From Tuesday 15 June to Thursday 29 July 2010, The Fitzrovia Radio Hour performed a second run of shows at the Last Days of Decadence in Shoreditch. The run consisted of two shows.

=== Edinburgh Fringe 2010 ===
From Thursday 5 August to Sunday 29 August 2010, The Fitzrovia Radio Hour performed at the Underbelly, as part of the Edinburgh Festival Fringe. They performed in the Belly Dancer venue. The show featured 'The Man Who Was Ten Minutes Late', 'Mudmen from the Thames' (Mulryne) and 'The Four-Minute Mystery' (Edgley Bond) and was sponsored by Roses Carbolic Soap. It starred Alix Dunmore, Fiona Sheehan, Tom Mallaburn, Phil Mulryne and Alex Ratcliffe and it was directed by Jon Edgley Bond. The Edinburgh Fringe show was reviewed by The Daily Telegraph, Broadway Baby, The Arts Desk and Fringe Review; the show was also featured in The Scotsman and on WhatsOnStage.com.

While in Edinburgh, The Fitzrovia Radio Hour performed in the 'Pick of the Fringe' and recorded a performance for the BBC Radio 4 programme 'Curiosity Killed the Cabaret', which was broadcast on Tuesday 24 August. Both shows were hosted by the Pleasance Courtyard. 'Curiosity Killed The Cabaret' also featured Frisky and Mannish, Anil Desai, Oompah Brass and Asher Treleaven and it was presented by Ali McGregor.

In September 2010 The Fitzrovia Radio Hour performed an extended version of their Edinburgh show at Wilton's Music Hall in London, on Friday 10 September, and at the Rose Theatre in Kingston upon Thames on Friday 17 and Saturday 18 September. On 8 November 2010 the show was performed at Quarterhouse in Folkestone. This show also featured 'Leinigen and the Pole' (Edgley Bond).

=== BBC Radio 2010 ===
The Fitzrovia Radio Hour have appeared multiple times on BBC Radio. They made three appearances on BBC Radio London's Saturday Breakfast, in the third show broadcasting a short excerpt from 'The Man Who Was Ten Minutes Late'. They also recorded a topical sketch for BBC Radio 4's Today programme on Saturday 30 January 2010. On Saturday 12 June 2010 The Fitzrovia Radio Hour returned to the 'Today programme' to perform a second topical sketch. On the same day they performed a short satirical sketch on BBC Radio 4's 'Loose Ends' programme, presented by Clive Anderson.

On Wednesday 4 August 2010 the BBC website published a performance by The Fitzrovia Radio Hour recorded for the BBC arts editor, Will Gompertz.

=== Trafalgar Studios 2011 ===
From Tuesday 11 January to Saturday 5 February 2011, The Fitzrovia Radio Hour performed at Trafalgar Studios, on Whitehall in London, as part of a double bill with Barbershopera. The show featured 'He Should Have Known His Place (Mallaburn/Pengelly), 'Undead Queen of Evil!' (Mulryne) and 'Captain Fasthand and the Rooty Gong' (Mallaburn/Pengelly). It was sponsored by Rathbone's Chemical Cures (Edgley Bond). The show was reviewed widely by the national press and discussed on BBC2, on 'The Review Show'.

== Press and media ==
The Fitzrovia Radio Hour have received positive reviews from WhatsOnStage.com, The Guardian, Time Out, The Times, The Independent, The Daily Telegraph, The [York] Press and Metro. Time Out named The Fitzrovia Radio Hour as one of 'Tribes of London'.

The Fitzrovia Radio Hour have also featured in The Independent, The Independent on Sunday, The Daily Telegraph, Financial Times, The Pink Paper, The Stage, Stylist magazine, London Evening Standard, and WhatsOnStage.com.
