= David Oakes =

English actor (born 1983)

David Oakes FLS
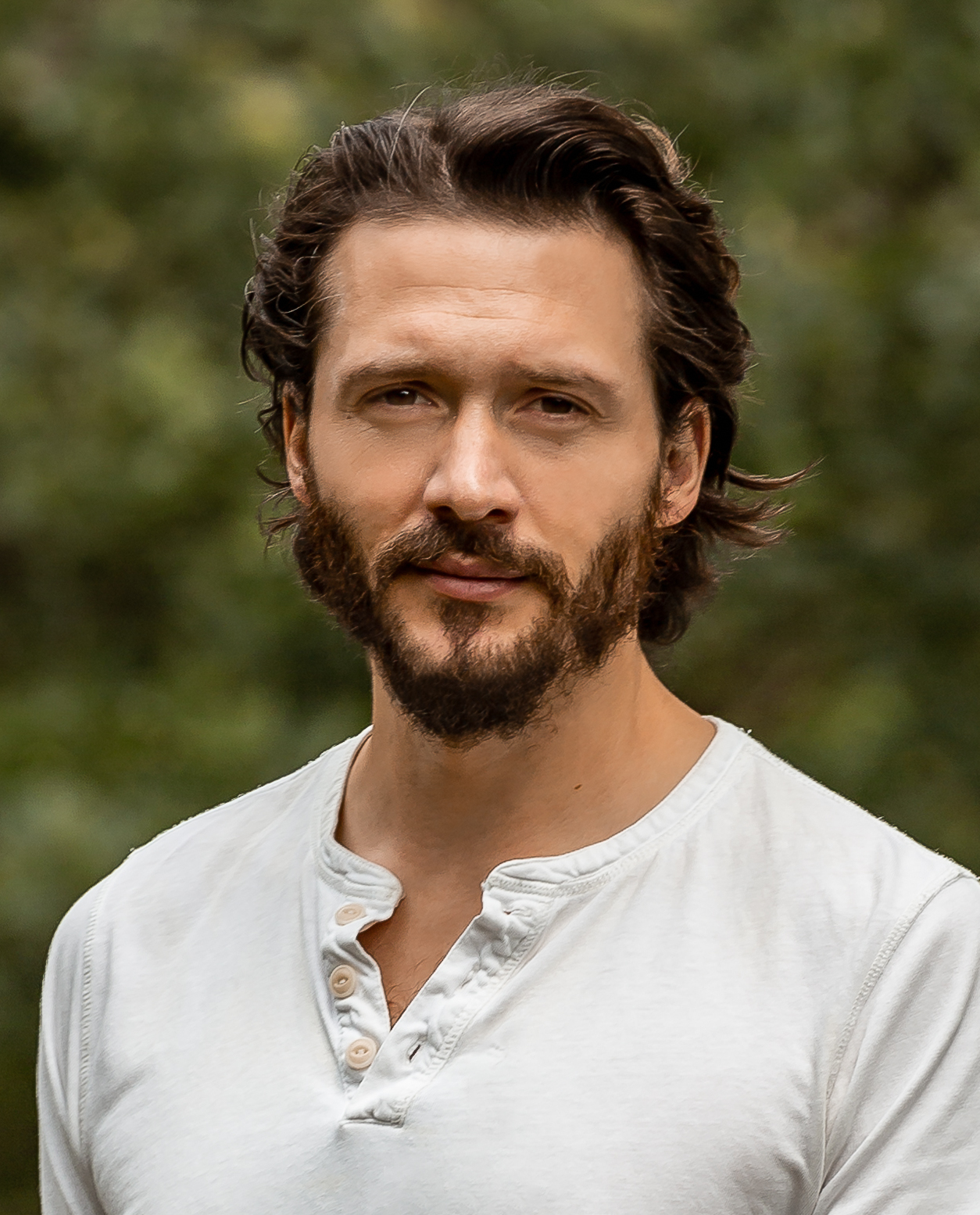
- Oakes in 2020
- Born: Rowan David Oakes; 14 October 1983 (age 43); Salisbury, Wiltshire, England
- Education: University of Manchester (BA), University of Exeter (MSc), Bristol Old Vic Theatre School (PGDip)
- Occupations: Actor and Ecologist
- Years active: 2006–present
- Partner: Natalie Dormer (2018–present)
- Children: 2
- Website: www.davidoakes.co.uk

Rowan David Oakes FLS (born 14 October 1983) is an English actor, ecologist and conservationist. He is best known for his roles in the series The Pillars of the Earth, The Borgias, The White Queen, Victoria, Vikings: Valhalla, and for his discursive Natural History podcast, Trees A Crowd. He currently serves as Vice President to The Wildlife Trusts.

== Early life and education ==
Oakes was born in Salisbury, Wiltshire, in 1983, the son of a Church of England canon.

Oakes grew up in Fordingbridge, Hampshire. He attended Bishop Wordsworth's School in Salisbury. His first job was backstage at the Salisbury Playhouse. Oakes graduated with a first class degree in English Literature from the University of Manchester, and an MSc in Evolutionary and Behavioural Ecology from the University of Exeter. He graduated from the Bristol Old Vic Theatre School in 2007.

== Career ==
Oakes began his career at Shakespeare's Globe, before taking roles at the Almeida Theatre and the Old Vic. Since appearing at Shakespeare's Globe at the outset of his career, Oakes has frequently performed in numerous rehearsed readings as part of their "Read Not Dead" initiative, including their landmark 200th reading of Philip Massinger's A New Way To Pay Old Debts; Oakes played Wellborn alongside a cast including Benjamin Whitrow, Alan Cox, and Nicholas Rowe.

In 2006, Oakes performed a 90-minute abridged version of Much Ado About Nothing as part of the Royal Shakespeare Company's "Complete Works" festival along with his final year graduates from the Bristol Old Vic Theatre School. He alternated between playing Claudio and Verges alongside fellow graduate Matt Barber.

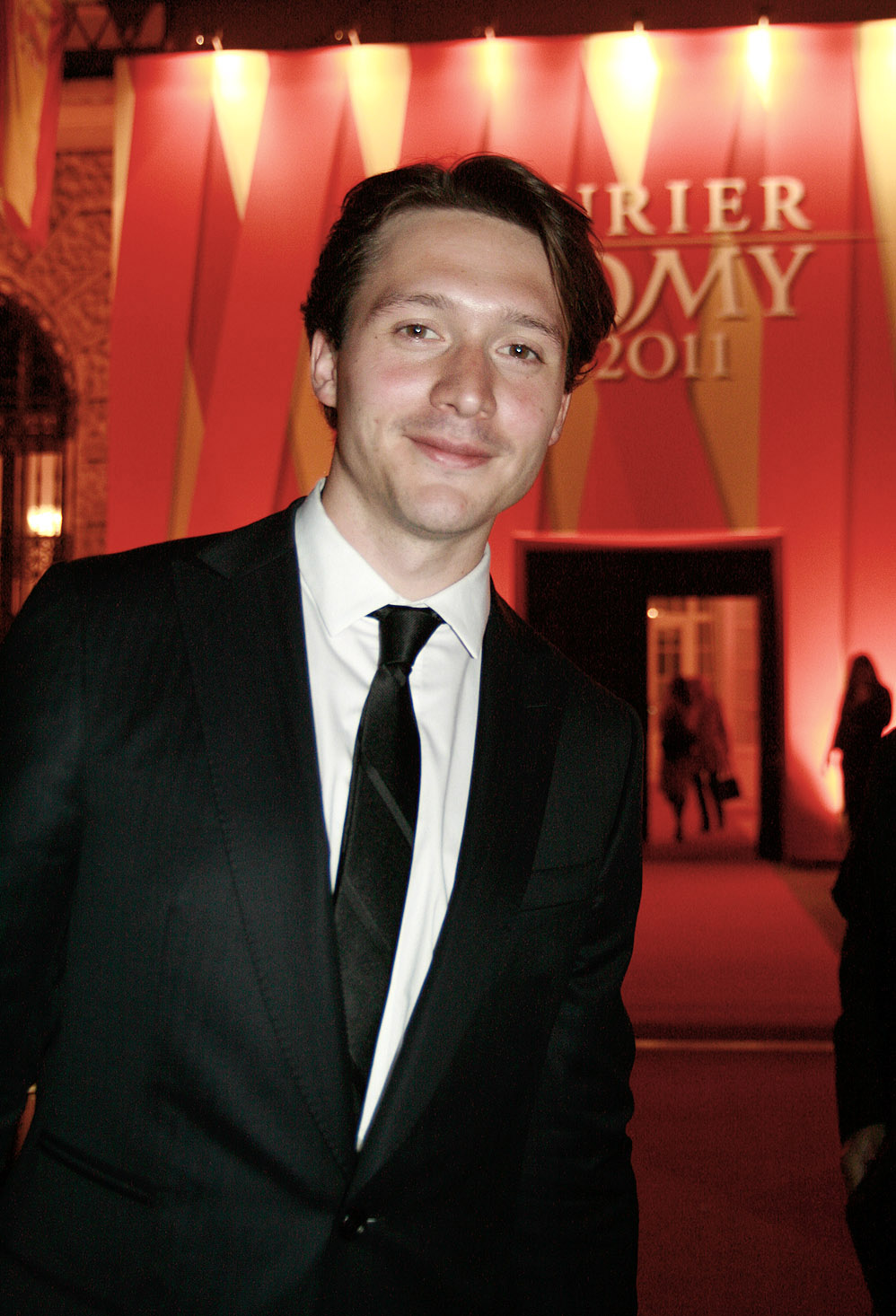
David Oakes at the Kurier Romy TV Awards, Hofburg Imperial Palace, Vienna, 2011

Oakes was present to accept the Jury Prize at the 2011 Romy Awards in Vienna alongside Donald Sutherland and Natalia Wörner.

Oakes came to prominence when he played the villainous William Hamleigh in the television miniseries The Pillars of the Earth (2010). The following year, Oakes was cast in the television series The Borgias (2011), airing on Showtime. Whilst shooting the second season, Oakes performed a cameo in the sequel to The Pillars of the Earth, World Without End (2012).

Between 2010 and 2013, Oakes had several roles playing villains on television —such as William Hamleigh in The Pillars of the Earth (2010), Juan Borgia in The Borgias (2011), and George Planagenet, Duke of Clarence in The White Queen (2013). When he played Mr. Darcy in an adaptation of Pride and Prejudice at Open Air Theatre, Regent's Park in 2013, he said, "I've been playing bad guys back to back, so Darcy's a bit of an antidote!" In 2014, he starred in the original West End production of Shakespeare in Love at the Noël Coward Theatre as Christopher Marlowe. Oakes was nominated for both WhatsOnStage and Broadway World awards for his performance in Shakespeare in Love in 2015.

Other performances between 2008 and 2013 for "Read Not Dead" include an early quarto edition of Henry IV: Part One as Prince Hal opposite Benjamin Whitrow's Falstaff, Calderon's Life is a Dream (La Vida Es Sueno) as Segismundo, Taming Of A Shrew as Aurelias, The Spanish Tragedy as Lorenzo, The Return from Parnassus as Ingenioso, Bassianus as Geta, Gorboduc as a "smooth, almost oily" Arostus, John Lyly's Love's Metamorphosis as Montanus, and Thomas Middleton's Your Five Gallants as Tailby.

In a return to TV period dramas in 2015, Oakes guest-starred in both the third season of Endeavour with Shaun Evans and in BBC's limited series The Living and the Dead with Colin Morgan. He played Prince Ernest, brother of Queen Victoria's husband Prince Albert, in the 2016 ITV series Victoria. The role reunited Oakes with his Trinity co-star Tom Hughes, and Pillars of the Earth co-star Rufus Sewell.

In 2017, Oakes starred in the film adaptation of Albert Sánchez Piñol's novel Cold Skin, directed by Xavier Gens and co-starring Ray Stevenson and Aura Garrido. He also starred as Thomas Novachek in the London West End premiere of David Ives's play Venus in Fur at the Theatre Royal Haymarket. This production was directed by Patrick Marber and co-starred Natalie Dormer as Vanda.

Oakes played Earl Godwin in Vikings: Valhalla, the spin-off of the show Vikings, for Netflix.

Oakes set up a theatre company called Dog Ate Cake with a long-term theatrical collaborator Henry Bell.

In 2015 Oakes starred as Banquo in a charity fundraiser for the Shakespeare Schools Festival. The event was largely improvised by the actors and lawyers involved, but based on a framework written by Jonathan Myerson. The cast also included Christopher Eccleston as Macbeth, Haydn Gwynne as Lady Macbeth, Paterson Joseph as MacDuff, and Pippa Bennett-Warner as one of the Weird Sisters. The event interrupted the events of the original play following the death of Duncan, placing Macbeth on trial for murder. Oakes, Joseph, and Gwynne appeared as witnesses for the prosecution while Eccleston and Bennett-Warner played witnesses for the defence. The event was overseen by High Court Judge Sir Michael Burton; the QCs were John Kelsey-Fry, Jonathan Laidlaw, Dinah Rose, and Ian Winter, and the foreman of the jury was Jeremy Paxman.

In 2019, Oakes played Hamlet at Shakespeare's Rose Theatre, York. The Stage wrote that he "plays Hamlet with natural ease: he is clearly comfortable with the cadences of the language and he conveys meaning well." Both WhatsOnStage and the British Theatre Guide praised Oakes' performance, particularly his rapport with the audience, despite the production's more light-hearted take on the play.

In 2025, Oakes starred in a production of “Anna Karenina” at Chichester Festival Theatre. He appeared as “Kostya” Levin in the parallel storyline to that of his real-world partner, Natalie Dormer, who played the role of Anna. Oakes’ performance garnered universal praise. The Times said, “Oakes wins our sympathy as Levin”, whilst The Guardian stated that: “…the relationship that sparks most on stage is that between Levin (based on Tolstoy himself, played by David Oakes) and Kitty, from its humour to its tenderness.” Whatsonstage praised his performance as being "wonderfully still".

=== Theatre direction ===
Oakes has directed a number of theatre pieces alongside his acting career. In 2003 he took a stage adaptation of The Wicker Man to the Epping Forest Theatre Festival. Rehearsing in and around his hometown of Salisbury, Oakes "got kicked out of the [Cathedral] Close for rehearsing pagan rituals for [his] open-air production of The Wicker Man."

While at university, Oakes directed numerous plays including Martin McDonagh's Beauty Queen of Leenane, Harold Pinter's The Dumb Waiter and Anthony Minghella's Whale Music.

Also whilst at University in 2005, Oakes assisted director Natalie Wilson on a production of Smilin' Through that was co-produced by the Truant Company, Birmingham Repertory Theatre, and Contact Theatre, Manchester. Later that year, Oakes once again turned to literary adaptation, taking a production of Stephen King's The Boogeyman to the Edinburgh Festival Fringe.

With his and Bell's theatre company, Dog Ate Cake, in 2009 Oakes directed a small tour revival of John Maddison Morton's Box and Cox.

Oakes frequently directs at Shakespeare's Globe extending their "Read Not Dead" series, a study devoted to performing fully staged readings of the entirety of the Early Modern Canon of Drama. Most recently Oakes directed Robert Greene's The Honourable History of Friar Bacon and Friar Bungay and Lewis Theobald's "Happy Ending" version of John Webster's The Duchess of Malfi, "The Fatal Secret".

Oakes recently directed an extract of Robert Daborne's A Christian Turn'd Turk as part of a special "Read Not Dead" event at Shakespeare's Globe. Four directors with four scholars were teamed up with actors and presented their arguments and selected scenes at a special hustings event on Thursday 29 May 2014. Winning the event, teamed with Dr Emma Smith of Oxford University, Oakes directed the full play on Sunday 5 October 2014 in the Sam Wanamaker Playhouse.

=== Podcasts ===
In 2020, Oakes narrated an episode of Historic Royal Palaces' Outliers podcast. He appeared as Thomas Phelippes, a spy and code breaker in the court of Elizabeth I plotting the downfall of Mary, Queen of Scots.

Oakes is the presenter of the natural history podcast Trees A Crowd. The first episode was released on 25 February 2019 and featured Mark Frith.

== Personal life ==
Oakes has been in a relationship with actress Natalie Dormer since 2018 whom he met while appearing in Venus in Fur. Dormer gave birth to their first daughter in 2021. The couple entered into a civil partnership in February 2023 in Bath, Somerset. Dormer and Oakes have two daughters. Oakes plays both the clarinet and bass clarinet, and is a bass singer. He is an avid follower of folk music, and continues to support the Bristol folk group Sheelanagig.

== Ecology and Conservation ==
Oakes holds an MSc in Evolutionary and Behavioural Ecology from the University of Exeter. He is a Fellow of the Linnean Society of London. Since 2019, he has produced and presented the award-winning Natural History podcast, Trees a Crowd.

=== Conservation Charity Work ===
Since 2019, Oakes has been an Ambassador for the Woodland Trust. On 9 October 2019, Oakes hosted a discussion at the 70th Cheltenham Literature Festival on the subject of "The Art of Trees".

Writing in an editorial for the Sunday Times on 2 November 2019, Oakes said:

Trees give us so much: if you can come up with a better technology and material that is cheap, enhances wellbeing, stimulates happy childhood memories, sequesters CO2, boosts biodiversity and even just looks as pretty as a copper beech, a hawthorn or a horse chestnut, then I’ll bow to you.

On 30 January 2020, Oakes was a co-signatory, with the CEOs of The Wildlife Trusts, the National Trust, the Woodland Trust, the RSPB, the World Wide Fund for Nature, Friends of the Earth, Greenpeace, Buglife and Butterfly Conservation, and other notable environmental ambassadors and activists, on a letter written to Prime Minister Boris Johnson, and published in The Times, to get the UK government to rethink its stance on the second UK High Speed Rail Link along environmental and biodiversity lines.

On 21 June 2020, Oakes co-hosted the live-stream event The Big Wild Quiz for The Wildlife Trusts as part of their "30 Days Wild" campaign. Nine days later, on 30 June, alongside environmentalists and activists, including Chris Packham and Ellie Goulding, Oakes took part in the Climate Coalition's mass virtual lobby to focus the MPs to put people, climate and nature at the heart of the British nation's recovery. He also hosted The Big Wild Quiz in 2021.

On 26 November 2020, Oakes became an ambassador for The Wildlife Trusts, and on 18 February 2026 was announced as the charity’s Vice President, saying:

Our country is one of the most nature depleted on the planet; and yet perversely you don’t have to look far to find huge swathes of people who have a passion for wildlife. Ultimately, there is no better placed organisation than The Wildlife Trusts to unify a desire in Britain and our overseas territories to protect what we have - before it is too late. Where our governments fail, it is the duty of The Wildlife Trusts and its supporters to step up to save our unique and irreplaceable wild places.

Following a visit to a Rhino Conservation project in Namibia, one supported by David Shepherd Wildlife Foundation, on 29 June 2023 Oakes was made a Conservation Ambassador for the charity.

In 2024, it was announced that Oakes was serving as a trustee for the Badger Trust, and in 2025 he was made a Patron for the Manta Trust.

Oakes was part of the Manta Trust delegation at the twentieth CITES COP successfully petitioning for the up-listing of all Manta and Devil Rays to appendix one of the CITES treaty - he was also representing David Shepherd Wildlife Foundation in support of the African Elephant Coalition.

== Charity work and advocacy ==
Other than the above national and international conservation advocacy, Oakes has supported:

=== British Lung Foundation ===
Oakes, following his infant niece being diagnosed with a lung condition, has been heavily involved with raising awareness for and fundraising on behalf of the British Lung Foundation.

In 2013, Oakes collaborated with his Borgias castmate Holliday Grainger to make the short comedy film Goblin. Directed by Christian James, the film was screened at the 2014 Film 4 Fright Fest in their Shorts Showcase, and all profits from the sale of this film were donated to the British Lung Foundation.

Later in 2014, Oakes ran the length of the country to raise awareness for infant lung diseases for both the British Lung Foundation and ChILD Lung Foundation UK. In 2016, he joined with the BLF to promote their new Children's Hub to provide families with information and support.

=== Arts charities ===
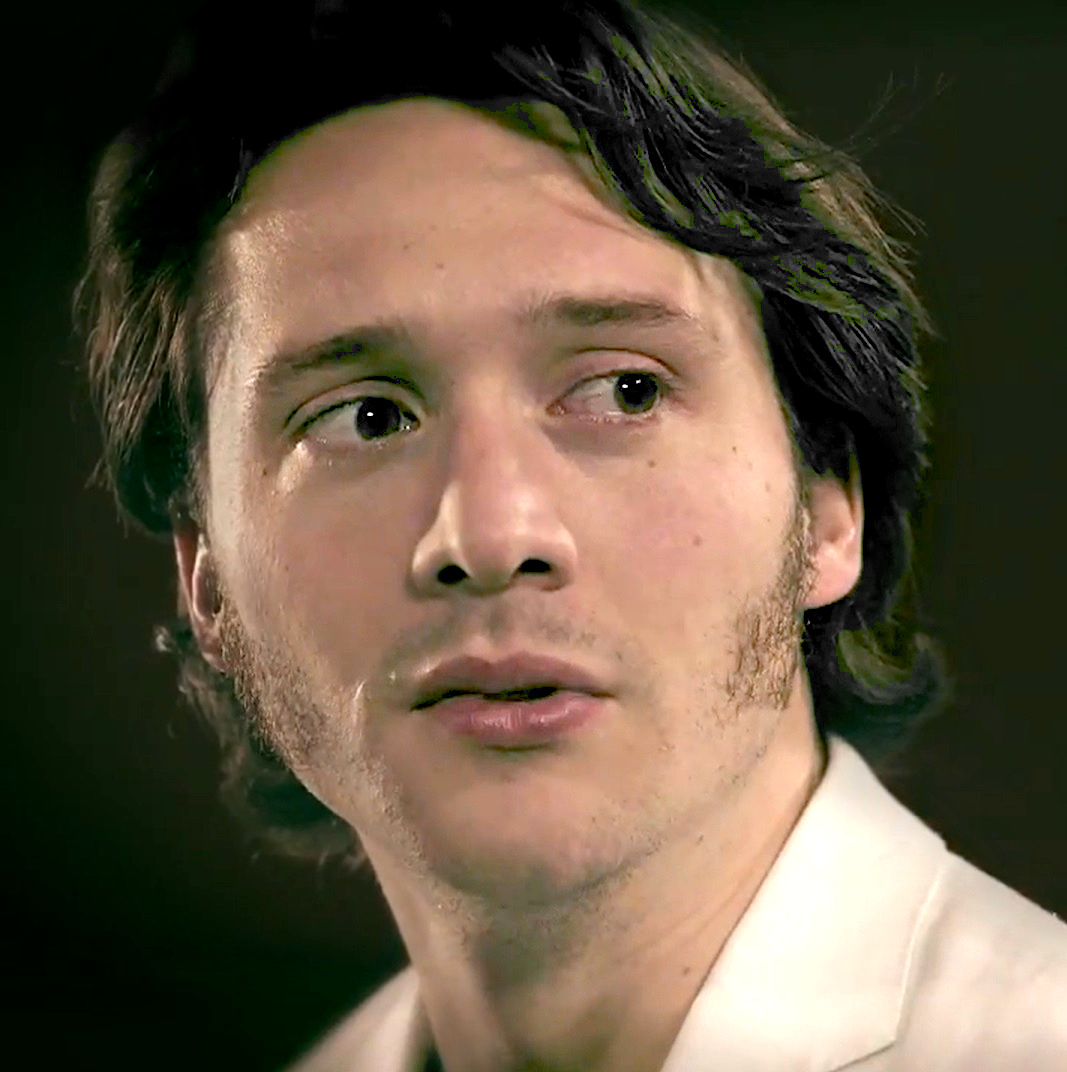
David Oakes as Phao in the play Sapho and Phao by ShaLT 2013

Since 2014, Oakes has also been a friend of Anno's Africa, an arts-based charity working with Kenyan orphans and slum children, and has supported the UK based Shakespeare Schools Festival, most notably with and surrounding their "Trial of Macbeth" and "Trial of Richard III". In 2019, Oakes helped organise, and alongside Michael Palin, Twiggy and others, appeared in the "Just A Book" poster campaign on the London Underground. The campaign was created to support independent businesses and bookshops on British highstreets and also to raise funds for Anno's Africa.

== Filmography ==
=== Television ===
Year	Title	Role	Notes
2008	Bonekickers	Alfred, Lord Tennyson	Episode 6 "Follow the Gleam"
2008	Walter's War	Oswald Hennessey	Television movie
2009	Henry VIII: The Mind of a Tyrant	George Cavendish	Episode 3 "Lover"
2009	Trinity	Ross Bonham	Episodes 1, 2, 3
2010	The Pillars of the Earth	Lord William Hamleigh	Mini-series
2011–2012	The Borgias	Juan Borgia	Season 1 & 2
2012	World Without End	Bishop Henri	Oakes appears as a secret cameo alongside Charlotte Riley. Oakes was back in Budapest filming The Borgias, so the producers of World Without End thought it would be a fun nod to the original series.
2013	Ripper Street	Victor Silver	Episode 8 What Use Our Work?
2013	The White Queen	George, Duke of Clarence	Episodes 1 - 7
2014	Kim Philby: His Most Intimate Betrayal	Kim Philby	Two-part drama documentary by Ben MacIntyre
2015	Endeavour	Jocelyn "Joss" Bixby	Season 3: "Ride"
2015	The Living and the Dead	William Payne	Episodes 4 - 6
2016–2017	Victoria	Ernest II, Duke of Saxe-Coburg and Gotha	Season 1 and 2, and Christmas Special
2022–2024	Vikings: Valhalla	Earl Godwin	Seasons 1, 2 & 3

=== Film ===
Year	Title	Role	Notes
2012	Truth or Dare	Justin	Also known as "Truth or Die" in the United States
2012	100Dniowk@	David Potter	Polish-language feature film – for which Oakes learned Polish
2013	Love By Design	Adrian	
2013	Goblin?	Harry	Short film with Holliday Grainger
2013	Who Shall I Play With Now?	Gregory	UK premiere on 29 June 2013 at the Wimbledon Shorts Festival
2014	Sins of a Father	Martin	A partially re-shot, re-edited version of the 1991 film Shuttlecock with Alan Bates and Lambert Wilson
2015	Night Feed	Husband	A short film made by Channel 4 with Alice Lowe for Film Four Frightfest
2017	Cold Skin	Friend	
2018	The Garden of Evening Mists	Frederick	Malaysian Films
2019	You	Brandon Miller	

=== Radio ===
- Oakes has performed with The Fitzrovia Radio Hour.
- 2008: A Dance to the Music of Time as Charles Stringham (BBC Radio 4)
- 2017 - 2021: Seasons 1 to 4 of Foiled as Richie (BBC Radio Wales)— written by David Charles and Beth Granville, based on the Edinburgh Fringe show of the same name

=== Stage ===
Year	Title	Role	Theatre	Director	Notes
2006	Much Ado About Nothing by William Shakespeare	Claudio & Verges	Royal Shakespeare Company & Bristol Old Vic Theatre School	John Hartoch	
2007	Love's Labour's Lost by William Shakespeare	Dumaine	Shakespeare's Globe & International Tour	Dominic Dromgoole	
2007	We the People (world premiere) by Eric Schlosser	Charles Pinckney & Gunning Bedford Jnr	Shakespeare's Globe	Charlotte Westenra	
2008	Old Vic New Voices: The Twenty-four Hour Plays	Davide	Old Vic Theatre		
2008	Journey's End by R. C. Sherriff	Raleigh	Mercury Theatre, Colchester	Tony Casement	
2008	Mary Stuart by Friedrich Schiller	Mortimer	Traverse Theatre, Edinburgh	Aida Karic	
2009	All The Little Things We Crushed (world premiere) by Joel Horwood	Hugh	Almeida Theatre, London	Simon Godwin	
2011	Three Farces ("Slasher and Crasher", "A Most Unwarrantable Intrusion" & "Grimshaw, Bagshaw and Bradshaw") by John Maddison Morton	Samson Slasher & John Bagshaw	Orange Tree Theatre, London	Henry Bell	
2013	Pride and Prejudice by Jane Austen adapted by Simon Reade	Darcy	Open Air Theatre, Regent's Park, London	Deborah Bruce	
2014–2015	Shakespeare in Love (world premiere) by Marc Norman & Tom Stoppard adapted by Lee Hall	Christopher Marlowe	Noël Coward Theatre, West End, London	Declan Donnellan	
2015	The Trial of Macbeth by Jonathan Myerson	Banquo	Noël Coward Theatre, West End, London	Christopher Haydon	
2017	Venus in Fur (West End premiere) by David Ives	Thomas Novachek	Theatre Royal Haymarket, West End, London	Patrick Marber	
2019	Hamlet by William Shakespeare	Hamlet	Shakespeare's Rose Theatre, York	Damian Cruden	
2025	Anna Karenina by Leo Tolstoy, adapted by Phillip Breen	Levin, Konstantin “Kostya” Dmitrievich	Chichester Festival Theatre	Phillip Breen	
