= Cold Skin (novel) =

Horror novel by Albert Sánchez Piñol

- English language cover
- Author: Albert Sánchez Piñol
- Original title: La pell freda
- Translator: Cheryl Leah Morgan
- Language: Catalan
- Genre: Horror novel
- Publisher: Canongate Books
- Publication date: 2002
- Publication place: Spain
- English publication date: 2006
- Media type: Print
- Pages: 240 pp
- ISBN: 1-84195-688-0
- OCLC: 62478982
- Dewey Decimal: 863.7 22
- LC Class: PC3942.429.A63 P4513 2006

Cold Skin (orig. Catalan La pell freda) is the debut novel by Catalan author Albert Sánchez Piñol. The novel has had numerous reprints and has been translated into 37 languages. More than 150,000 copies of its original edition were sold.

With this novel, the author achieved great sales and critical success and the translation rights were sold into 37 languages. In 2017 it was made into a film by the French director Xavier Gens.

== Synopsis ==
The novel chronicles the story of a former fighter for the independence of Ireland who, demotivated by the events of the Western World, decides to escape from the society in which he lives. He accepts a job offer as a weather official on a remote island in the south Atlantic close to the Antarctic Circle.

When he arrives at the island, he discovers that the previous weather official is missing, the cabin abandoned, and that the only other inhabitant of the island is the lighthouse keeper Gruner, who refuses to tell him what happened to the previous weather official.

That night, the Irishman and his cabin are attacked by amphibious frog-like creatures, who attempt to kill him. By staying up all night, he is able to fend them off until day light, at which point they retreat back to the ocean.

Realizing that the lighthouse is his only hope of staying alive, he sets out the next day to ask Gruner for shelter. Gruner rejects him and refuses him shelter in the lighthouse. Two days later, as the Irishman is at his limits of trying to survive the nightly attacks, Gruner appears during the day with a sack of beans and gives them to him, while also offering him unlimited use of his spring. In return, he asks for one of the two crates of bullets that the Irishman has amongst his supplies, while still refusing him entry into the lighthouse. The Irishman rebuffs his offer, while telling Gruner that his decision to refuse him entry to the lighthouse will get him killed.

Later, while bathing in Gruner's spring, he hears Gruner coming to the spring to get water. He attacks him, only to discover it is not Gruner, but a female frog monster gathering water in buckets. Realizing that the monster must be important to Gruner, he kidnaps her and uses her as a hostage to negotiate his way into living in the lighthouse.

Gruner reveals that he keeps the frog monster as a servant and mascot, and that she sings when the other monsters are near. The Irishman discovers that Gruner has a sexual relationship with the domesticated female monster, and is disgusted with Gruner for committing bestiality. Despite regular beatings from both Gruner and the Irishman, she does not attempt to return to the ocean even though she has free rein of the island and the light house.

Gruner reveals that he is not the lighthouse keeper, that he is actually the missing weather official, but that he took over the abandoned lighthouse as a base to resist the monster's attacks.

Night after night, the two men are attacked by the monsters and are forced to defend themselves. Gruner explains that they are after meat, and that when enough are killed, the survivors drag the bodies away to cannibalize them and thus sated, stop attacking for the night. The Irishman attempts to ration their bullets, hoping to be able to survive long enough to the next year, when the ship that dropped him off will return with a new weather official and take him away, but the attacks grow more frequent and more vicious.

Fearing they will run out of ammunition, the Irishman makes a plan to raid a local sunken ship that was carrying dynamite. He convinces Gruner that such a terrible show of force will run off the monsters once and for all. It takes days to convince Gruner, during which the Irishman starts having sex with the female monster in secret.

They are able to retrieve hundreds of pounds of dynamite from the ship wreck. While underwater, the Irishman encounters several baby monsters who treat him with curiosity and delight.

They set up the dynamite and days later are attacked. The explosion rips apart swarths of the island and kills thousands of the monsters. While the Irishman and Gruner walk through the bodies and kill any survivors, the Irishman notices that the female monster is weeping as she looks at the carnage.

Two days later, they are attacked again, causing a mental break down of the Irishman as he realizes that nothing they do will stop the monsters from attacking them. The next day, the Irishman performs an experiment and determines that the female monster can laugh. He shows this to Gruner and tells him that he does not think that the monsters are mindless animals, but are a thinking people. Gruner firmly rejects this and continues to kill the amphibians at any opportunity.

When night falls and Gruner prepares for the attack, the Irishman refuses to participate and as they argue, the female monster begins to sing. The Irishman realizes she is not singing, but speaking to the monsters outside, and that they call themselves Sitauca and that her name is Aneris.

Determined to stop the fighting between them, the Irishman attempts to open peace negotiations by leaving the Sitauca the ammo-less shotgun. The shotgun disappears, and days later, hundreds of Sitauca children appear during the day. Day after day, the children watch the men or play amongst themselves. Deeply disturbed by the idea that they are sapient and the number of children that are constantly observing him, Gruner retreats further into the lighthouse and solitude.

The children become ever more comfortable with the Irishman and he is adopted as a parental figure by a Sitauca orphan that he names Triangle. The children continue to visit the island daily for weeks, until one day they all disappear except Triangle, who has stopped returning to the ocean each night and sleeps in the bed with the Irishman.

While Gruner gleefully prepares for battle, the Irishman goes outside and finds Triangle talking with several adult Sitauca. They push Triangle back towards the Irishman, and Triangle wraps himself around his knees.

Seeing the Sitauca, Gruner fires on the crowd while the Irishman begs him not to. In the chaos, Triangle flees into the ocean and is not seen again. The Irishman confronts Gruner in the lighthouse, causing Gruner to attack him and almost kill him before instead taking an axe and attacking the Sitauca mob outside. He is mauled to death and his body and the Sitauca disappear.

Over the next few days, the Irishman realizes that the Sitauca want Aneris back, but that she is unwilling to go, and that's why she stays in the lighthouse and endures all of the abuse from him and Gruner.

Driven into a deep depression by everything that has happened and the realization that Aneris's thoughts and desires are so alien to him that she will never return his love, he goes on a several day drinking bender.

He is awoken by a French captain bringing the new weather official. Still drunk, hungover, and overwhelmed by seeing so many humans, he is unable to answer or act normally. The captain leaves after receiving no answers from his interrogation, but not before robbing the Irishman.

The captain installs the new weather official into his official cabin and leaves. That night, the new weather official fights for his life in the cabin as the Sitauca attack. The Irishman meets him the next day, and in a scene reminiscent of the Irishman meeting Gruner, the Irishman demands his bullets while the weather official demands to be let into the light house. The weather official is filled with plans on how to fight off the Sitauca, while the Irishman wonders what happened to Triangle.

== Prizes ==
It won the Ojo Crítico Narrativa prize in 2002, and has been translated into 37 languages.

== Film adaptation ==
Alex and David Pastor wrote the film adaptation, directed by Xavier Gens and co-starring David Oakes, Ray Stevenson and Aura Garrido. The premiere was scheduled for the Étrange Festival 2017, in Paris, France.
