= Manta Trust =

- Manta Trust: Conservation through Research, Awareness and Education. Copyright © 2012 Manta Trust
- Founded: 2011
- Founder: Guy Stevens
- Website: mantatrust.org

The Manta Trust is a UK-based charity that was formed in 2011 to co-ordinate global research and conservation efforts for manta rays, their close relatives and their habitat.

As megafauna, manta rays act as a flagship species, helping to promote and engage the general public in the wider message of marine ecosystem conservation.

The Trust brings together manta and devil ray conservation projects from 16 global regions, adding Japan and Myanmar as of 2025. By conducting long-term studies into manta populations in these locations, the trust aims to build the solid foundations upon which Governments, NGOs and conservationists can make informed decisions to ensure the long-term survival of these animals and their habitat. They also provide educational presentations and workshops to youth, tourists, and fishers.

The BBC News program "Protecting the fragile manta rays of the Maldives" profiles Manta Trust's conservation efforts in the Maldives.

== Achievements ==
=== Manta ray species and five shark species gain protection under CITES Appendix II, March 2013 ===
In March 2013, Manta Trust helped secure protection for both manta ray species with approval for listing in CITES Appendix II.

=== Sharks, Rays, and Sawfishes gain protection under CMS CoP11, November 2014 ===
In November 2014, Manta Trust played in key role, along with several NGOs and other groups, in proposing and subsequently succeeding in getting new protective legislation granted to 21 species of sharks, rays and sawfishes by the Convention on the Conservation of Migratory Species of Wild Animals.

=== Mobula Rays listed on CITES Appendix II, October 2016 ===
In October 2016, the Manta Trust played a key role in a proposal for listing mobula rays on Appendix II of CITES. Being listed on Appendix II means countries must prove that the trade in mobula gill plates is sustainable and not detrimental to the survival of the species. Conservationists were delighted when CITES Parties officially listed devil rays, thresher sharks, and the silky shark under CITES Appendix II with the proposals supported by more than the two-thirds majority required for adoption.
