= Beccy Speight =

Chief executive officer in conservation charity sector

- Occupation: Senior management in environmental charities
- Known for: Chief Executive Officer of the Royal Society for the Protection of Birds

Beccy Speight is the chief executive officer of the Royal Society for the Protection of Birds.

== Career ==
Speight started her career working in local government in Scotland and then with the management consultants Smythe Dorward Lambert. Since 2000, she has worked in the conservation charity sector. She began working for the National Trust in 2000 and in 2005 became director for the East Midlands and Midlands regions. She was responsible for the development of the Trust's sustainable food policy and also installation of contemporary art. She moved to be chief executive at the Woodland Trust in 2014 and led expansion of the woodland creation charity and also a review of its priorities. In 2019 she was appointed the CEO at the Royal Society for the Protection of Birds.

In her role with the RSPB, she promotes a systematic approach, in collaboration with government, for changes in agriculture, fisheries and planning to allow fragmented environments to recover from their biodiversity losses.

== Awards ==
In November 2020, she was included in the BBC Radio 4 Woman's Hour Power list 2020.
