= Helen Pheby =

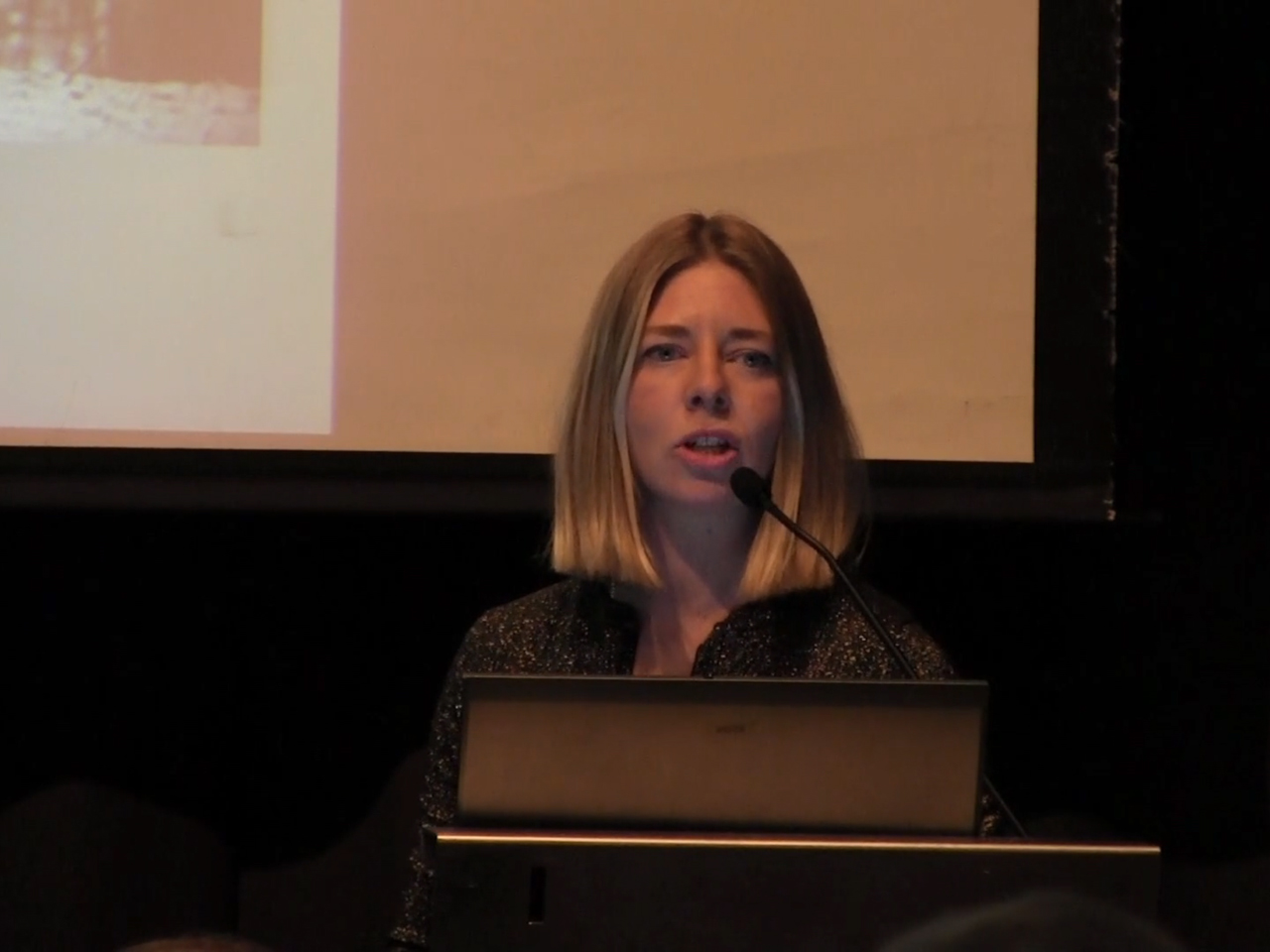
- Occupation: Cultural leader

Helen Pheby is Head of Culture, Heritage and Sport with the West Yorkshire Combined Authority. She was formerly Associate Director, Programme, at Yorkshire Sculpture Park. Dr Pheby was Vice Chair of the Civic art gallery and theatre in Barnsley; the Chair of UP Projects, London (2019–22); curatorial advisor to ArtRole in Iraqi Kurdistan and NIROX in South Africa. She is also a Cultural Fellow of York St John University and was an advisor to the Arts Council Collection Acquisition Committee (2016–17). Dr Pheby is regularly invited to undertake international lectures and tours including Sculpture Dublin (2020); Park 3020, Ukraine (2019); the Contemporary Austin, USA (2017) and as the guest of Creative India (2013). Helen has collaborated with Selfridges since 2018 to curate the Duke Street entrance to their flagship London store.

== Career ==
Pheby's PhD thesis considered the social and economic benefits of access to culture and the barriers to that access. Her career is dedicated to making all art public through policy and practice, including curating projects around the world.

Pheby has worked with international partners to co-curate several offsite projects including the Kyiv Sculpture Project (2012). In 2016 she curated 'A Place in Time' at the NIROX sculpture foundation in the UNESCO Cradle of Humankind, South Africa.

Pheby's 2016 exhibition 'Beyond Boundaries: Art by Email' in collaboration with ArtRole in Kurdistan-Iraq gave a platform to artists in the Middle East and North Africa whose political and other circumstances made it very difficult for them to travel to the UK.
