= Albert Sánchez Piñol =

Catalan writer

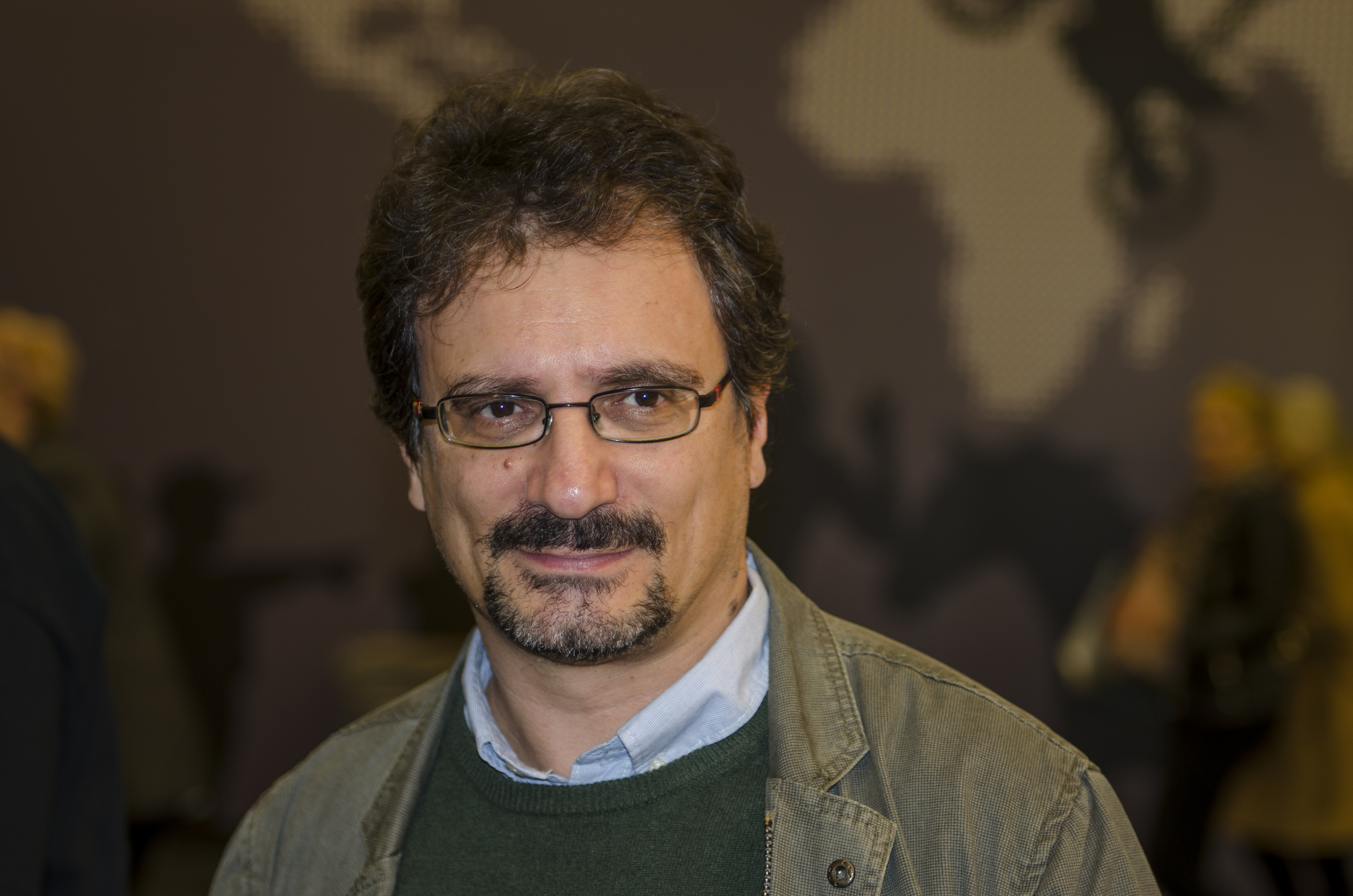
- Born: 11 July 1965 (age 61); Barcelona, Catalonia, Spain
- Citizenship: Spanish
- Occupations: Anthropologist and writer
- Writing career
- Language: Catalan and Spanish
- Period: 20th–21st centuries
- Genres: Non-fiction and novels

Albert Sánchez Piñol (Catalan pronunciation: [əlˈβɛrt ˈsaɲtʃeθ piˈɲɔl]; born 11 July 1965) is a Spanish anthropologist, non-fiction writer and novelist writing in Catalan and Spanish.

He has been described as a "significant European writer".

== Works ==
- Compagnie difficili (2000), with Marcelo Fois
- Pallassos i monstres (Clowns and Monsters) (2000)
- Les edats d´or (2001)
- La pell freda (Cold Skin) (2002)
- Pandora al Congo (Pandora in the Congo) (2005)
- Tretze tristos tràngols (Trece tristes trances in Spanish) (2008)
- Victus, the Fall of Barcelona (2012)
- Vae Victus (2015)
- Fungus, el rei dels Pirineus (Fungus: The King Of The Pyrenees) (2018)
- El monstre de Santa Helena (The Monster on Saint Helena) (2022)
- Pregària a Prosèrpina (Prayer to Proserpina) (2023)

== See also ==
- List of anthropologists
- List of Catalan-language writers
- List of novelists
- List of Spanish writers
