= Hay Festival =

Annual literature festival in Powys, Wales

Coordinates: 52.075°N 3.125°W

Hay Festival of Literature & Arts
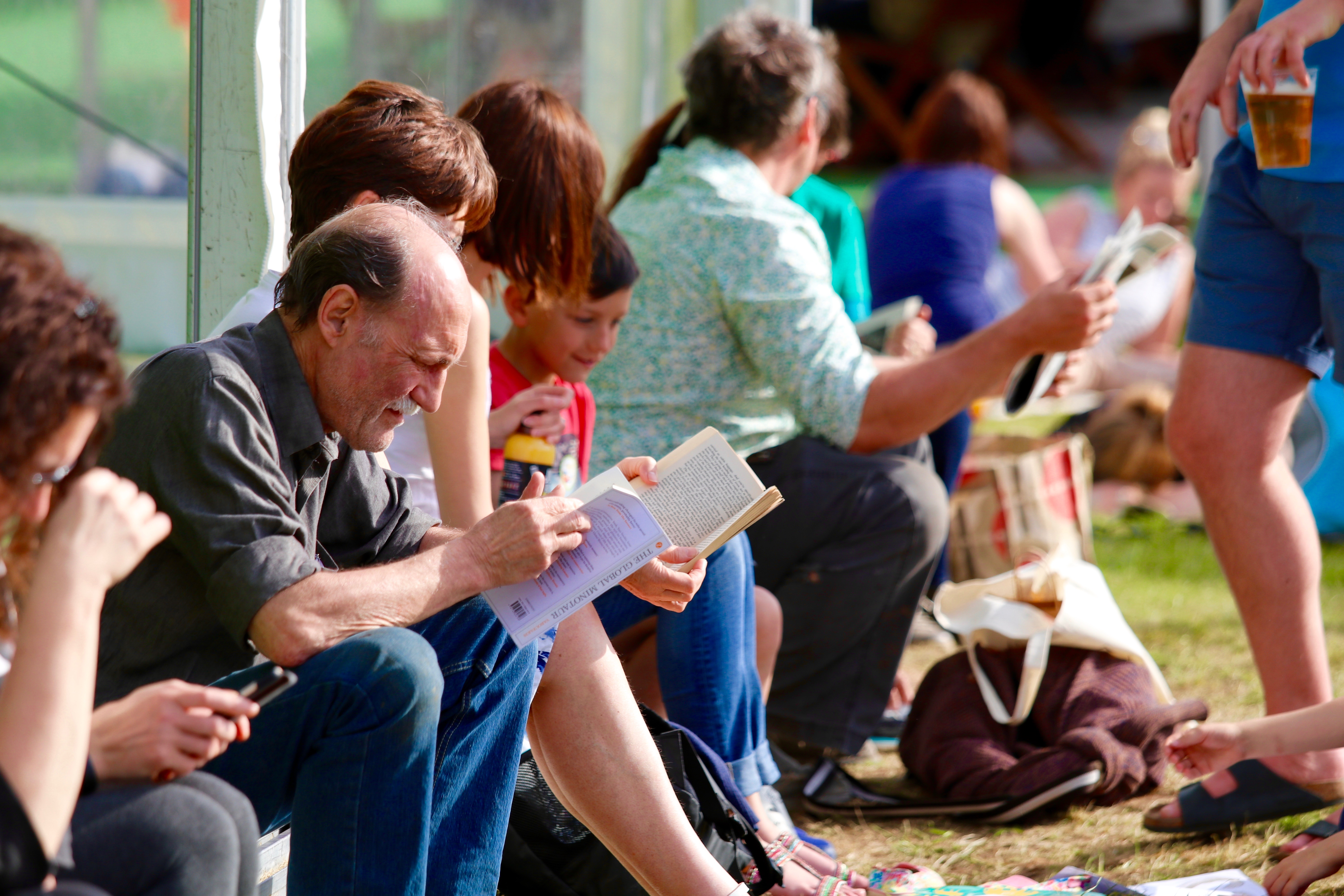
- Hay Festival crowds reading between sessions (2016)
- Genre: Literature
- Frequency: Annually
- Locations: Hay-on-Wye, Powys, Wales
- Founded: 1988; 38 years ago
- Founder: Norman, Rhoda and Peter Florence
- Website: www.hayfestival.com

The Hay Festival of Literature & Arts, or simply the Hay Festival (Welsh: Gŵyl Y Gelli), is an annual literature festival held in Hay-on-Wye, Powys, Wales, for 10 days from May to June. Devised by Norman, Rhoda and Peter Florence in 1988, the festival was described by Bill Clinton in 2001 as "The Woodstock of the mind". Tony Benn said: "In my mind it's replaced Christmas".

It has become a prominent festival in British culture, and sessions at the festival have been recorded for television and radio programmes such as The Readers' and Writers' Roadshow and The One Show. All the BBC's national radio channels apart from BBC Radio 1 have been involved in broadcasting from the festival, and Sky Arts showed highlights of the festival from 2010 until 2013, handing over the main coverage to the BBC for the 2014 event.

== History ==
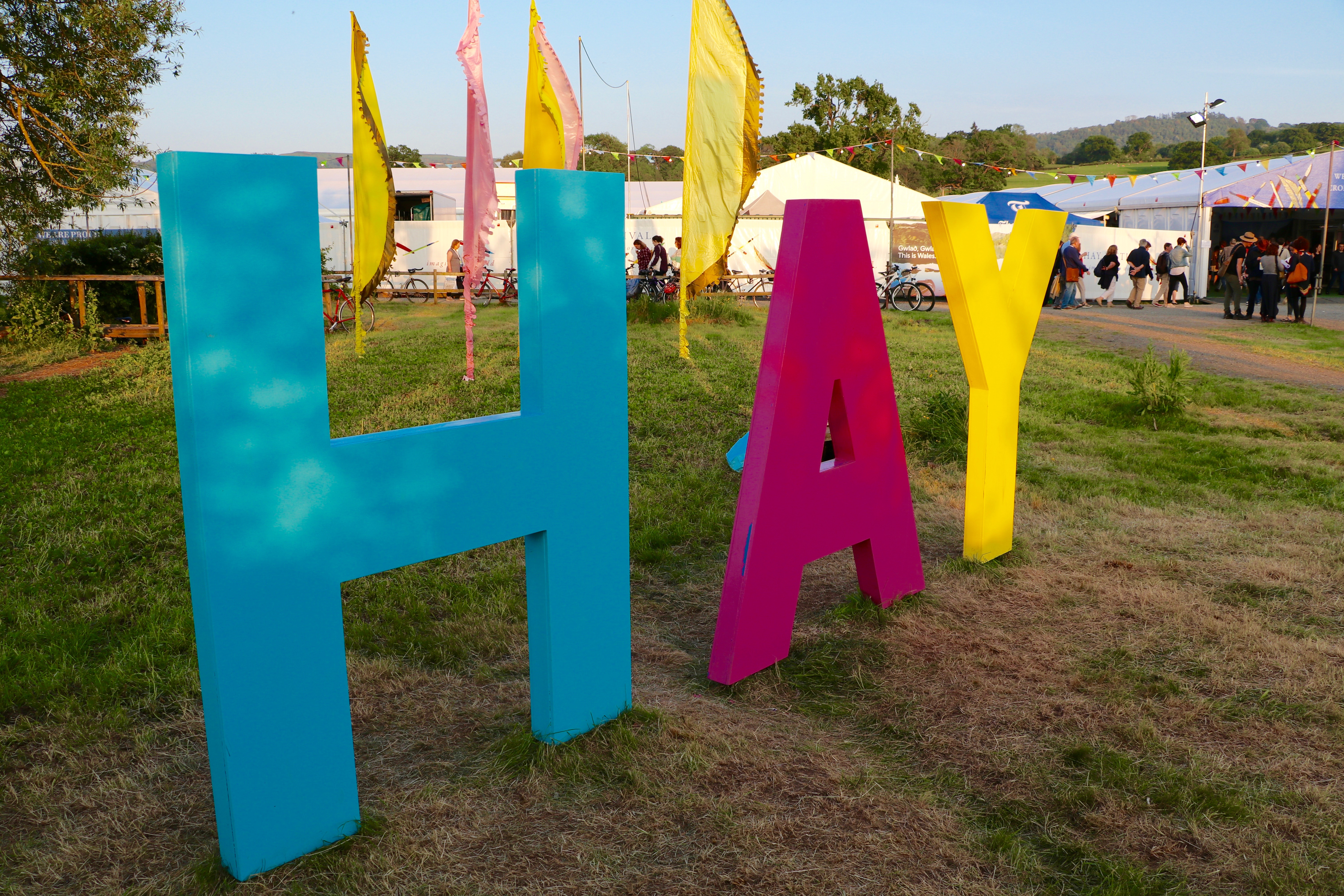
Sign at the entrance to the 2016 Hay Festival.

The festival was founded in 1988 by Peter Florence and his parents Rhoda and Norman. Hay-on-Wye was already well known for its many bookshops before the festival was launched. Richard Booth opened his first shop there in 1962, and by the 1970s Hay had gained the nickname "The Town of Books". From its inception, the festival was held at a variety of venues around Hay, including the local primary school, until 2005 when it moved to a unified location just south of the town.

The Guardian was the main sponsor of the festival from 2002 to 2010, succeeding The Sunday Times. The Daily Telegraph and its associated brands in Telegraph Media Group had two terms as three-year sponsors, starting with the 2011 festival. From 2017, the Tata Group and Baillie Gifford are among the principal sponsors, along with the BBC and many non-media companies such as the Arts Council of Wales and the British Council.

Cristina Fuentes La Roche has been the International Director at Hay Festival since 2005.

The festival has expanded over the years to include musical performances and film previews. A children's festival, "Hay Fever", runs alongside the main festival.

In 2020 the festival was held digitally online due to the COVID-19 pandemic.

In late July 2021, co-founder and director Peter Florence resigned as director. He commented: "I consider that my role had become untenable due to the conduct of the board and its insistence on holding a disciplinary hearing in my absence whilst I was off sick after a breakdown."

== Awards for the festival ==
The Hay Festival was one of 11 Welsh winners of The Queen's Awards for Enterprise for 2009. The 2009 festival included writers Carol Ann Duffy, David Simon, Stephen Fry, David Nicholls, Jenny Valentine and Melvyn Bragg, scientists Martin Rees and Sabine Bahn, economists Anthony Giddens, Nicholas Stern, Howard Davies and Danny Quah, comedians Dylan Moran, Dara Ó Briain and Sandi Toksvig, and general speakers David Frost, Desmond Tutu, Rowan Williams and Rhodri Morgan.

== Eccles Centre & Hay Festival Writer's Award ==
The Eccles Centre & Hay Festival Writer's Award is given annually to two writers to support their work on a forthcoming book, either fiction or non-fiction, relating to the Americas. It is supported by the British Library's Eccles Centre for American Studies. The winners each receive £20,000, divided into four quarterly grants, and have a research residency at the Eccles Centre, with curatorial support, and opportunities to promote their work at Hay Festival events in the UK and elsewhere.

== Abu Dhabi controversies ==
Some of the biggest NGOs and some bestselling authors signed a letter condemning the suppression of free speech in Abu Dhabi as the 2020 Abu Dhabi Hay Festival commenced in Abu Dhabi in February of that year. Authors who signed the letter included such well-known figures as Stephen Fry, Noam Chomsky, Jung Chang and Bernardine Evaristo. NGOs such as Amnesty International and PEN International condemned the abuse of free speech in the United Arab Emirates, which led to the arrest and abuse of human rights advocate Ahmed Mansoor. By the time of the festival, he was being held in solitary confinement and had been sentenced to serve a 10-year prison term.

The festival's chair, Caroline Michel stated on 18 October 2020 that the event would not return to Abu Dhabi, as a mark of support for an allegation by the festival’s curator, Caitlin McNamara, of sexual assault by the tolerance minister of UAE, Sheikh Nahyan bin Mubarak Al Nahyan. McNamara claimed that she had been assaulted by the minister when they met at a remote island villa in February 2019 concerning work. The Emirati Foreign Ministry declined to comment on personal matters. When reached out to, Britain's Metropolitan Police confirmed having received a report of alleged rape from a woman on July 3. In November 2020, Caitlin McNamara vowed to fight on following the CPS October 2020 decision not to prosecute the UAE minister because the alleged attack was said to have occurred outside its jurisdiction. McNamara said that this decision sent a message to Sheikh Nahyan and others who commit similar crimes "that as long as they're of economic value to the UK, they can do whatever they want". In an interview with The Sunday Times McNamara said she felt "abandoned" by the Hay Festival, and in an interview on Channel 4 stated that "mistakes" had been made in the way the festival handled her reporting the sexual assault to them which had been "very distressing" to her.

== Criticism of Festival ==
In 2009, bookseller and proprietor of Oxford House Books, Paul Harris, whom journalist Sean Dodson called a "Cromwell figure", held a mock trial of treason and symbolic "beheading" in effigy of Richard Booth as a protest at which criticism of the Festival was voiced.

Harris was concerned about the threat posed to the independent character of the town by the over-dependence on the commercial, outsider interests of the Hay Festival, "saying, we cannot trade off the profile of the festival for 52 weeks a year". Harris's prosecuting argument was that the Hay Festival had become too publicly dominant and had negatively impacted the economic fortunes of the many secondhand books shops that made up the town.

Harris argued that Booth, a promotional figurehead of the town due to his self-declared kingship of Hay, had been negligent in promoting the issues of the booksellers over the festival. He told the press in 2009, "You can fill a town with books, but that won't bring people to the town[...]You need publicity and promotion, which is now all sucked up by the festival. Richard used to be great at drumming up publicity and denouncing the festival. He's not able to do that any more, so we need to set up a council to replace him."

There were opponents to the "republican" mission, including the founder of the festival Peter Florence, who blamed the decreasing fortunes of the booksellers individually and said, they "need to rethink their (business) strategy". However, Harris argued that booksellers had seen a 50% decrease in sales in the years leading up to the revolt. Popular British novelist Robert Harris commentating at the time, sympathised with the booksellers, also suggesting that the recession and the internet had affected their fortunes. Duncan Fallowell said, "I call the festival Waterstones-on-Wye. It's almost lost touch with intellectual value" but Matthew Engel said, "Many festival goers don't go into the town, but the idea that the festival detracts from Hay is clearly preposterous."

=== Baillie Gifford controversy ===
In May 2024 the festival announced that it would suspend its sponsorship by Baillie Gifford in response to "claims raised by campaigners and intense pressure on artists to withdraw", after speakers including A. K. Blakemore, Dawn Butler, Charlotte Church, Nish Kumar, Ania Magliano, Noreen Masud and Tori Tsui announced that they would boycott the festival because of the sponsor's involvement with Israel and with fossil fuel. The opposition to Baillie Gifford was led by Fossil Free Books, which had organised a letter signed by over 200 authors which called on them to disinvest from Israel.

== Gallery ==
Images from the 2016 Hay Festival
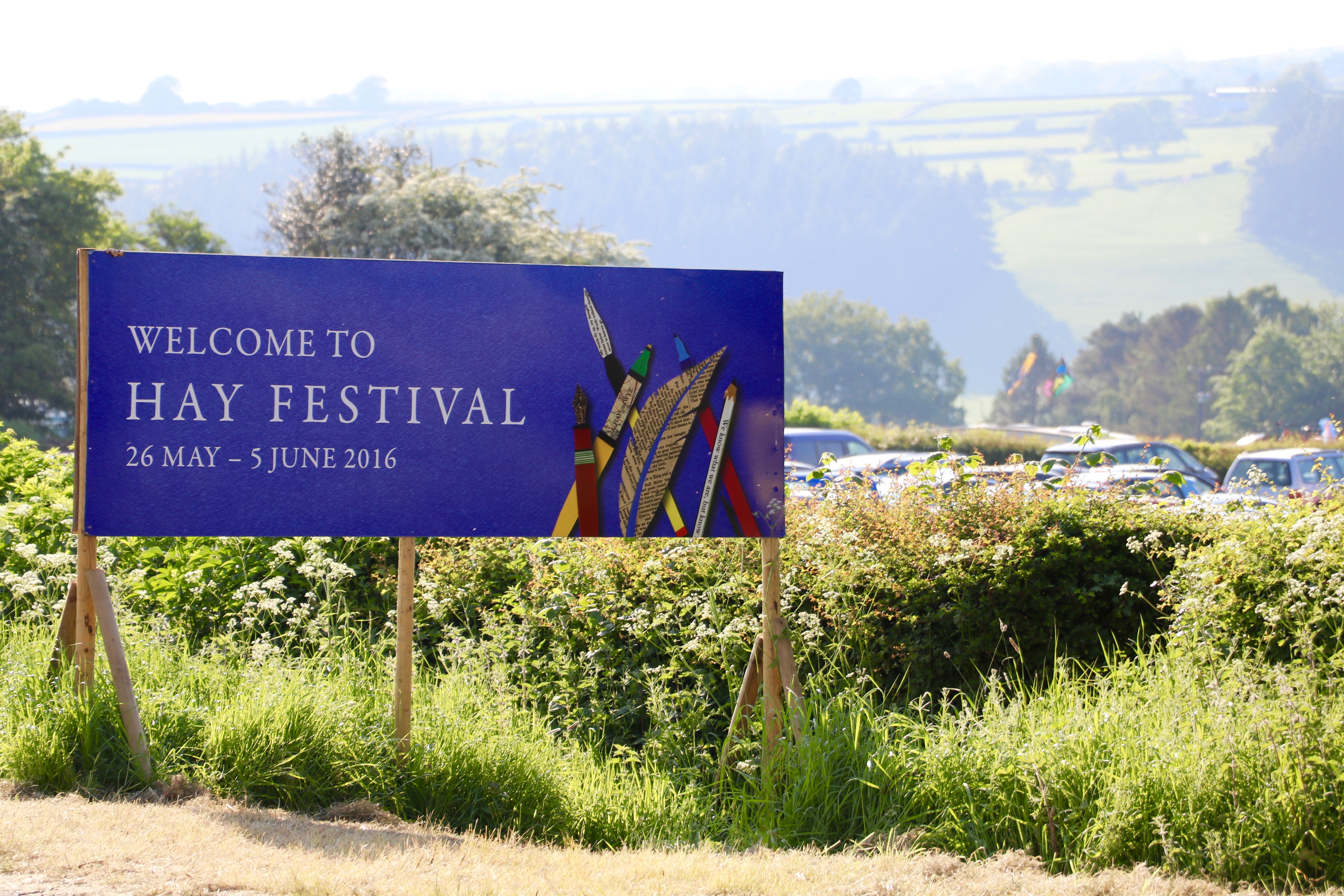
Welcome sign just south of Hay-on-Wye

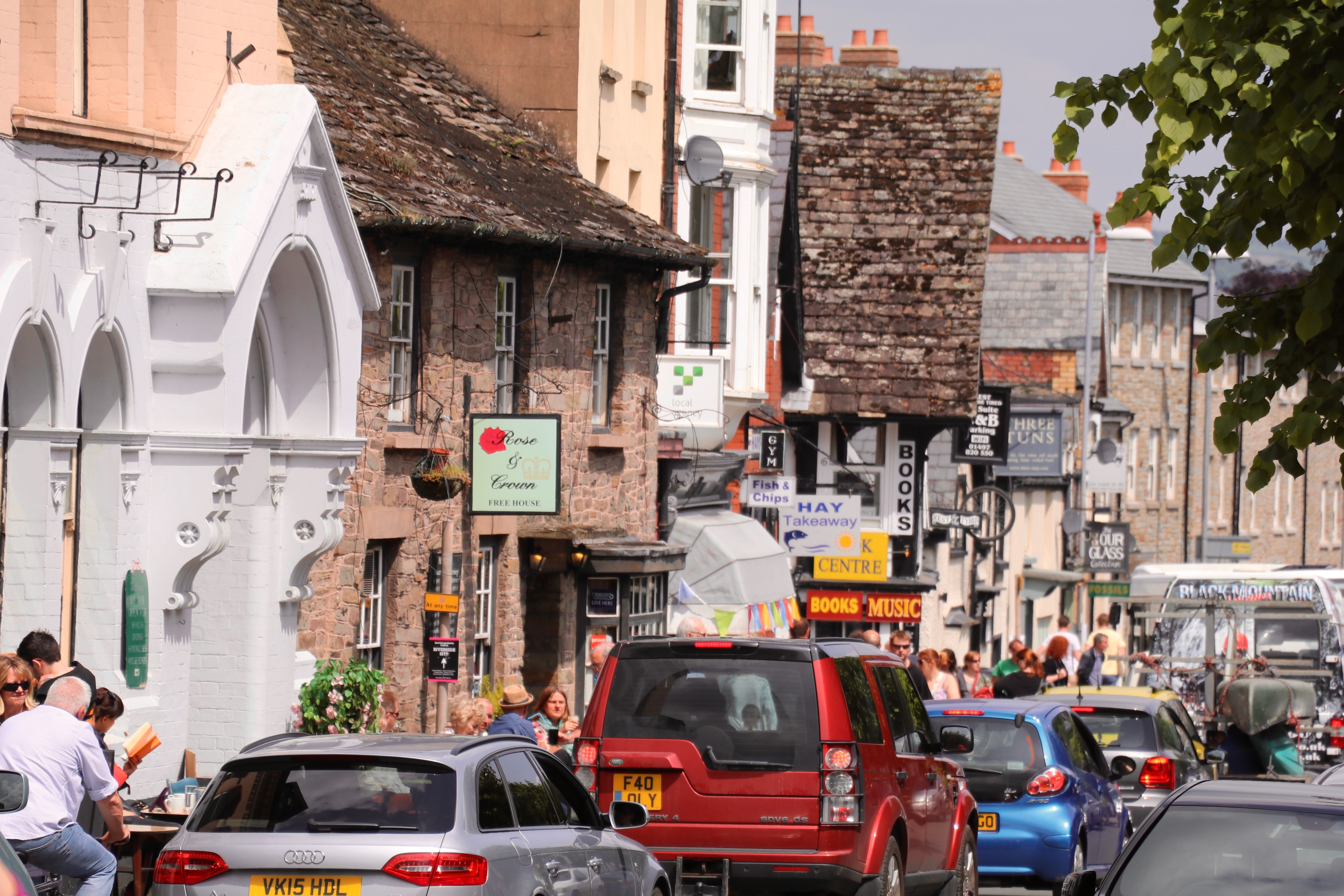
Traffic in the town of Hay during festival

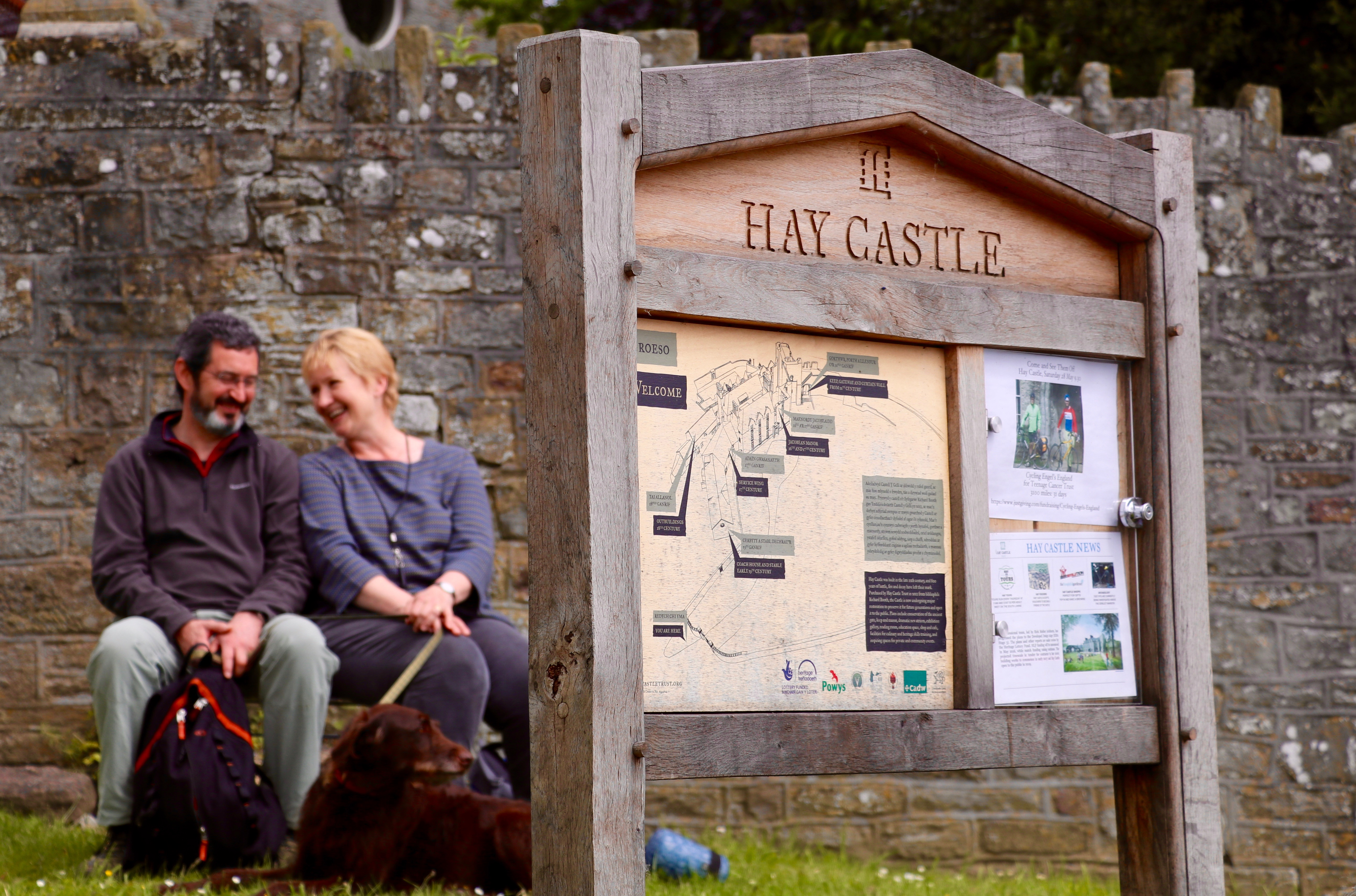
A couple at the castle in Hay during the festival

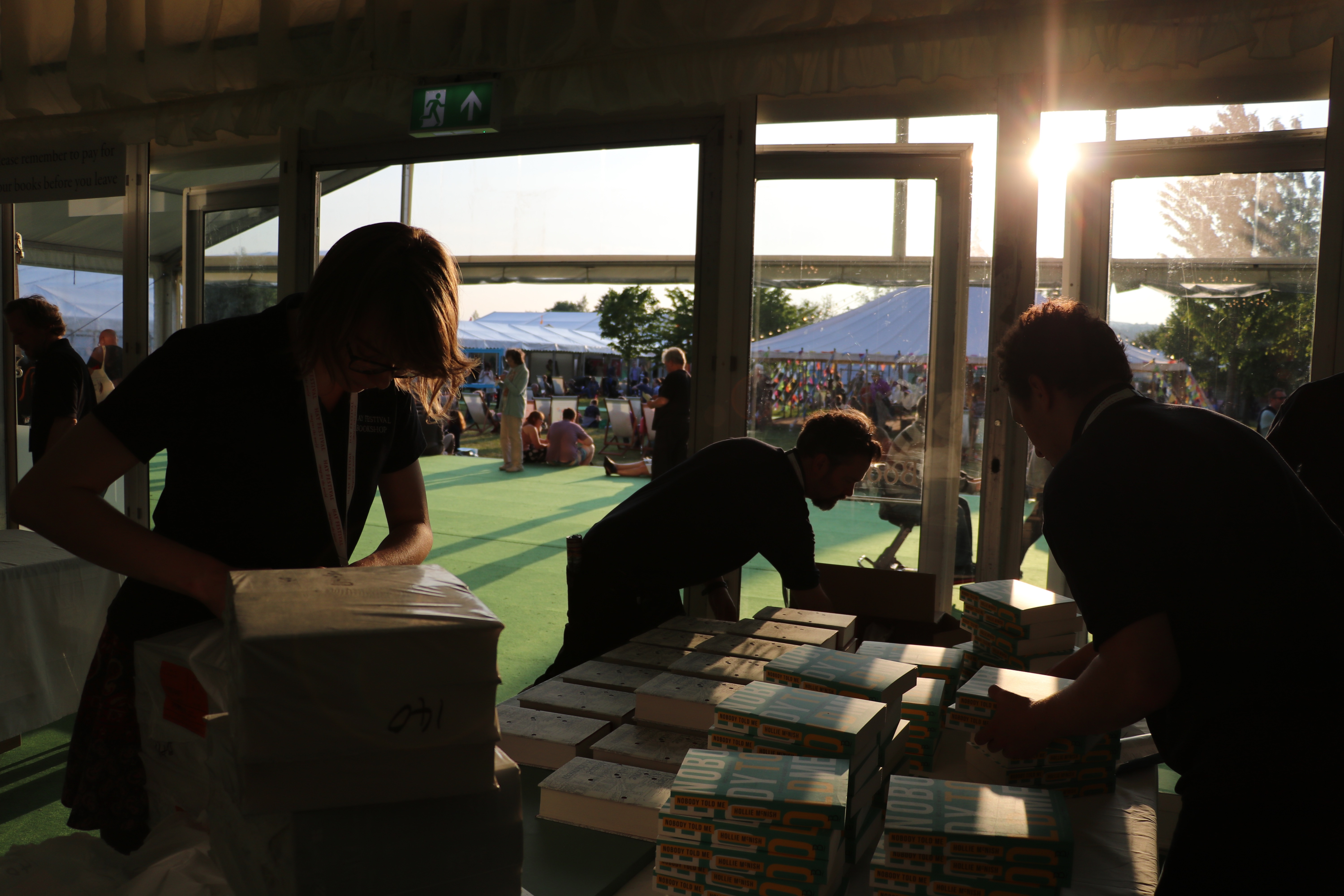
Workers prep books for signing at the bookstore

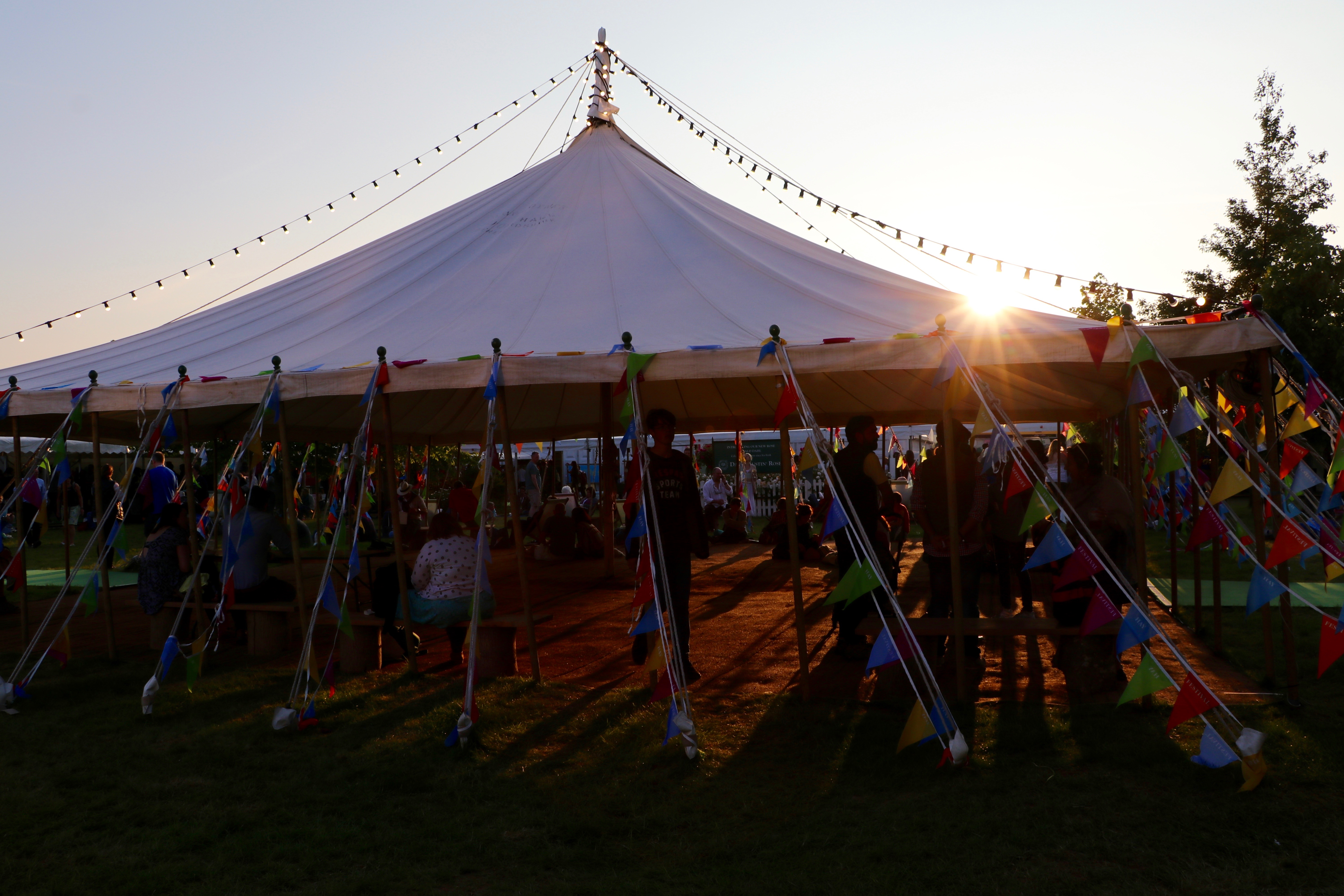
Tent at the Hay Festival

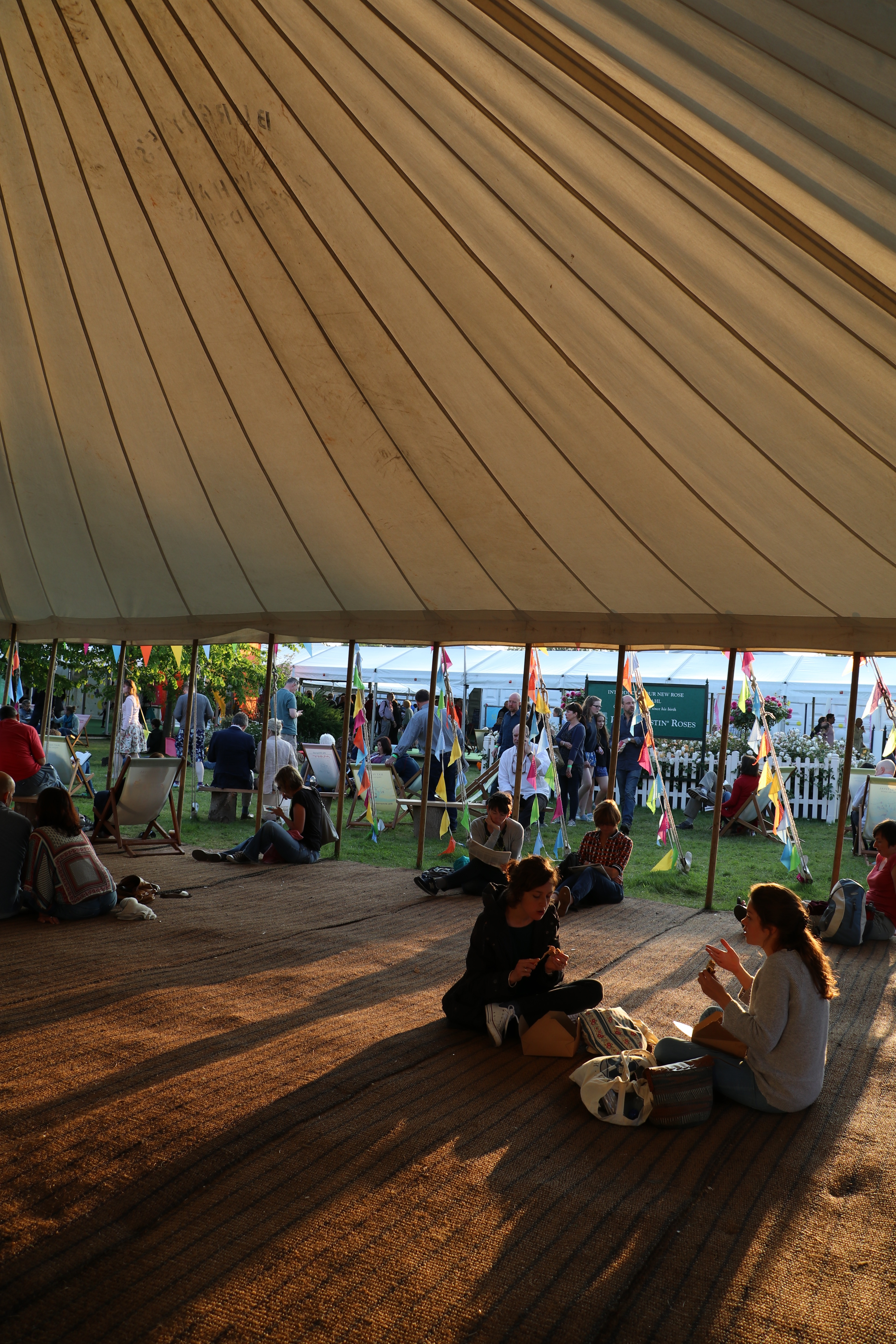
Attendees inside the tent

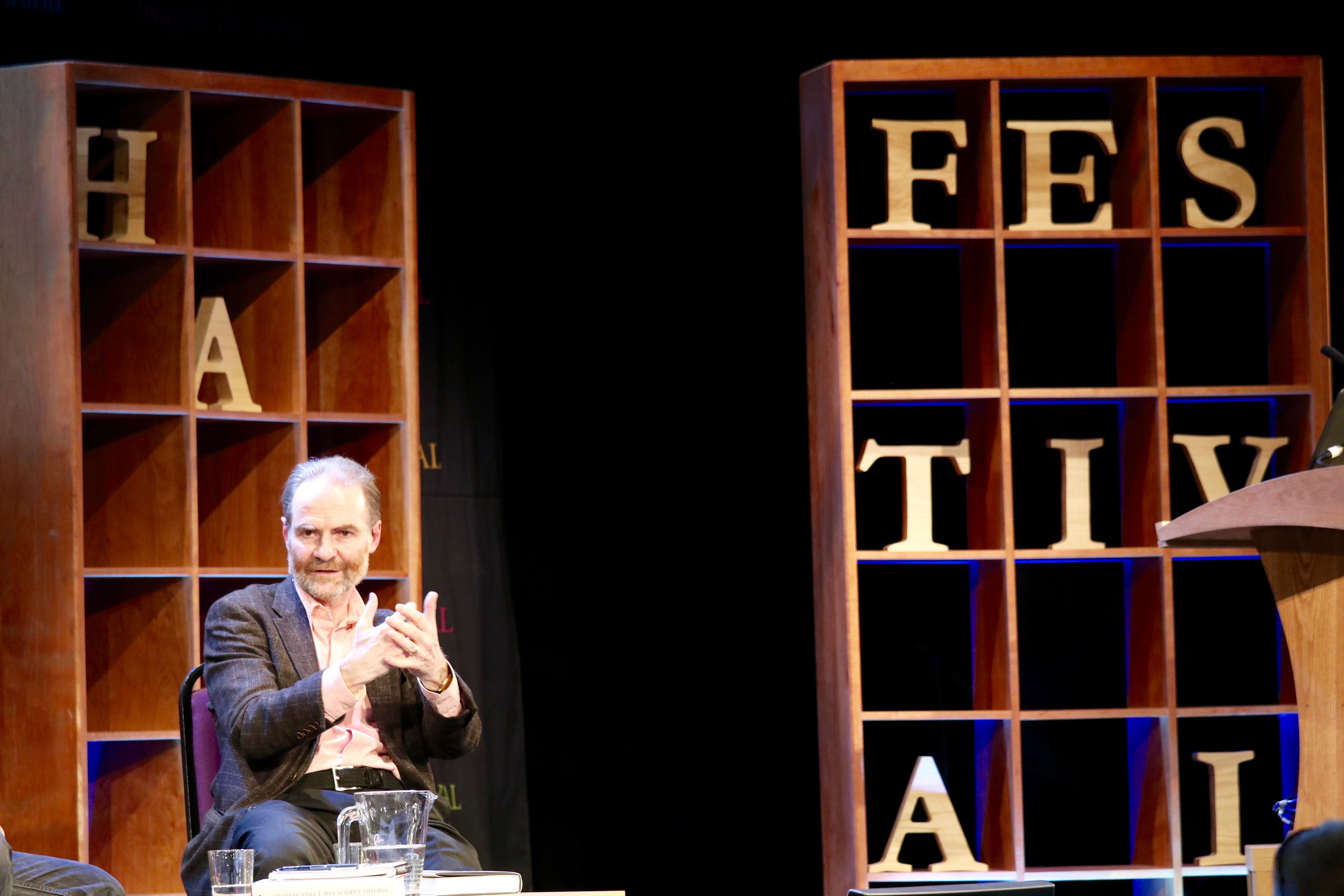
Timothy Garton Ash on stage

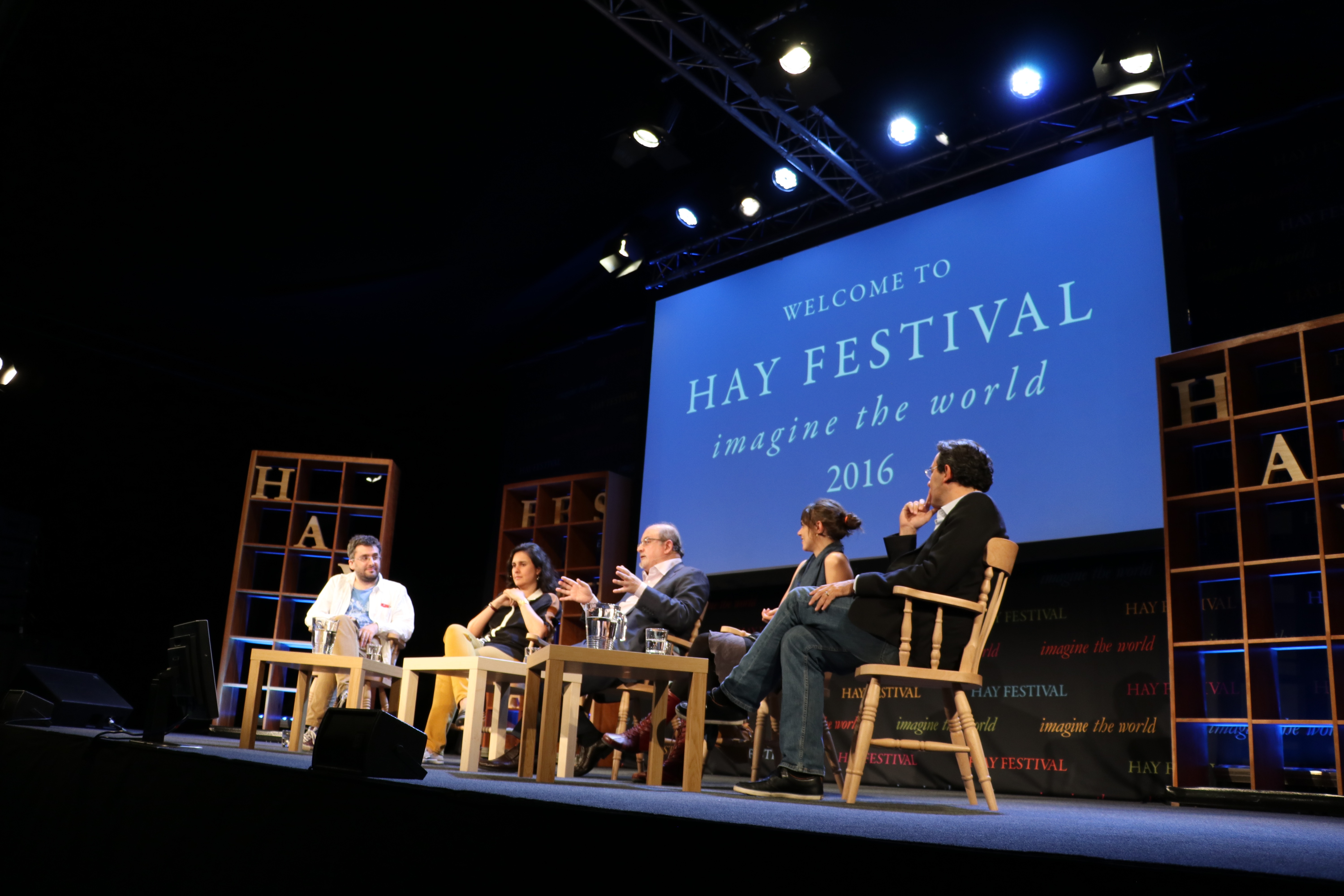
Salman Rushdie (centre) and others on stage

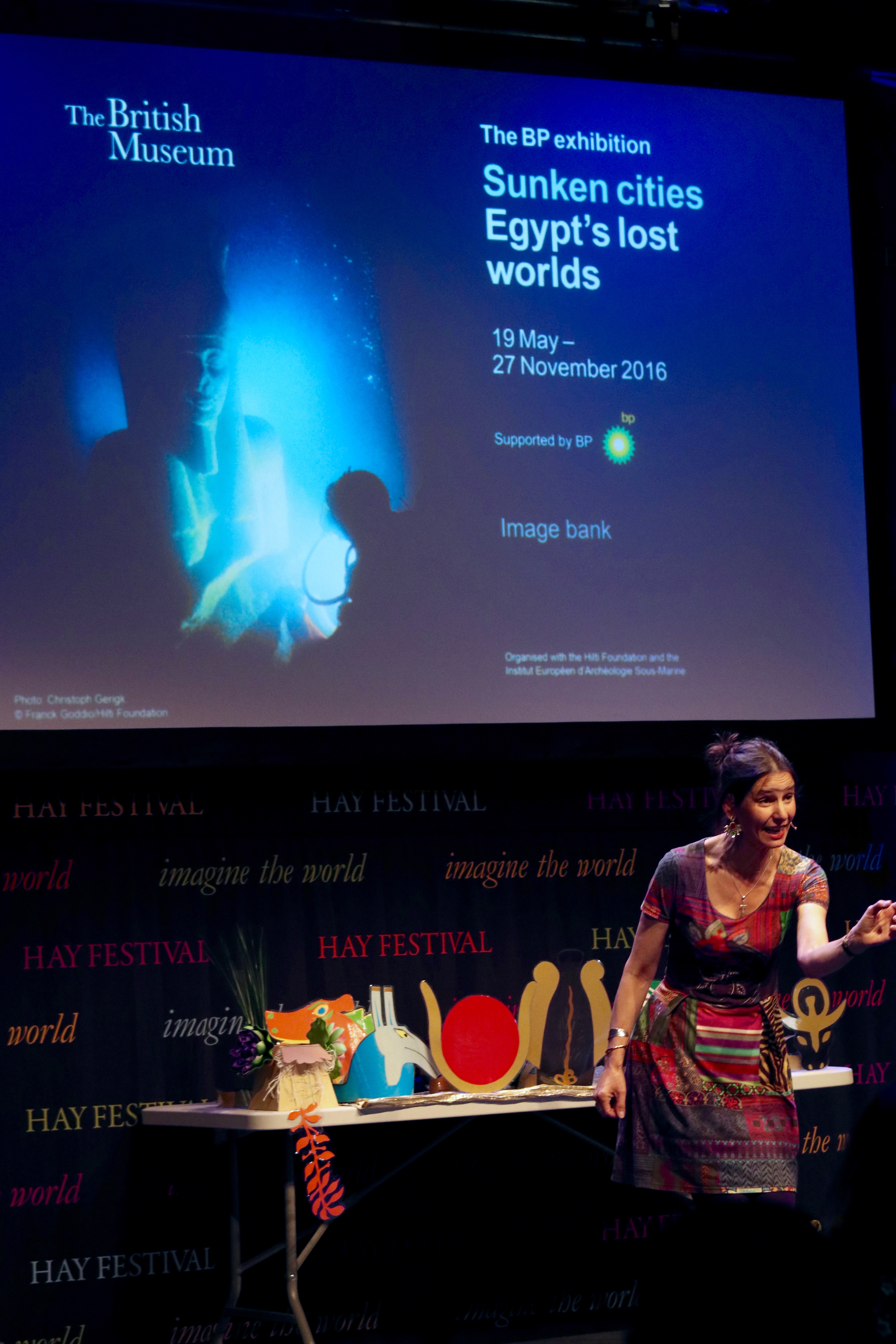
Storyteller explaining Egyptian exhibit at British Museum

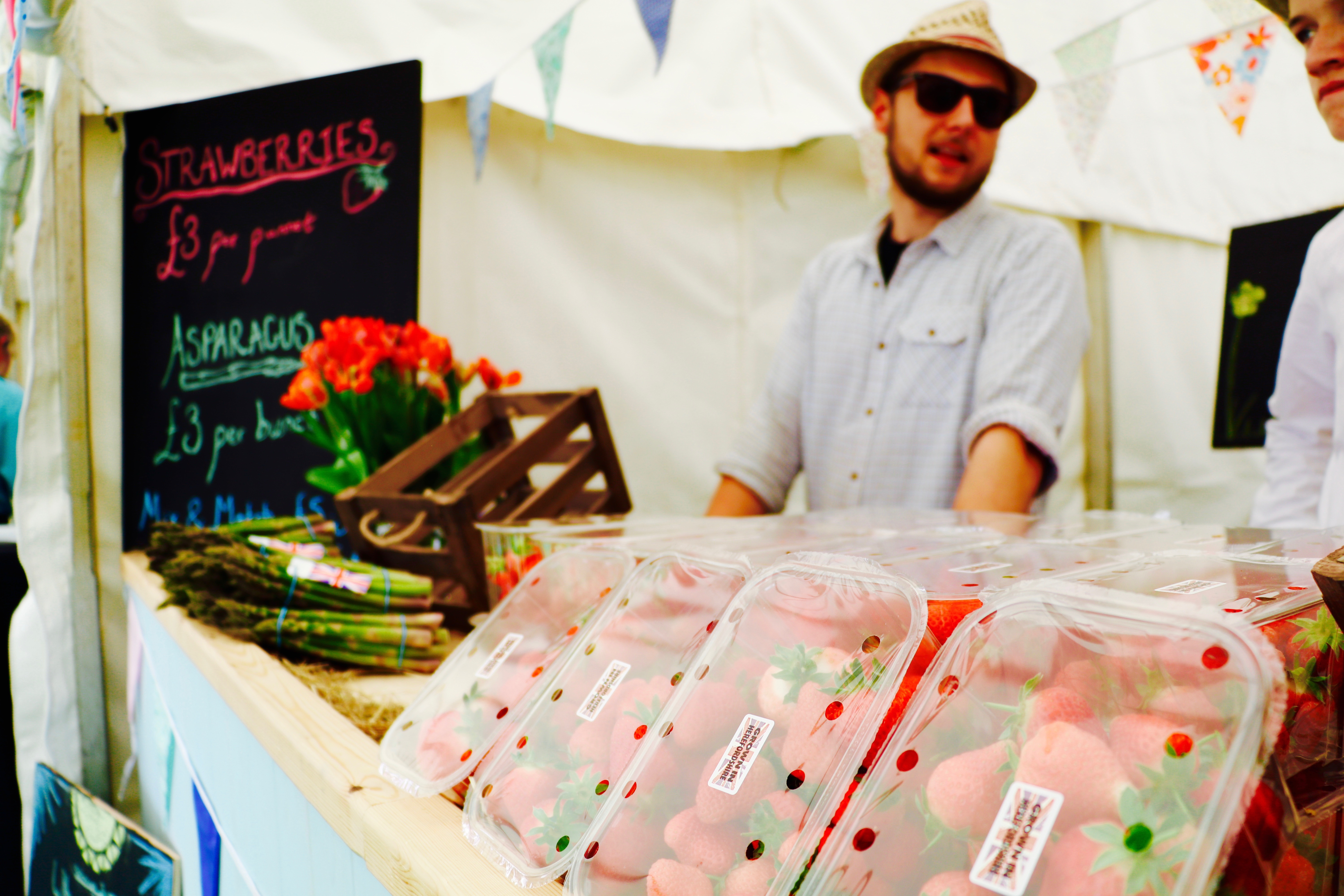
Strawberry vendor

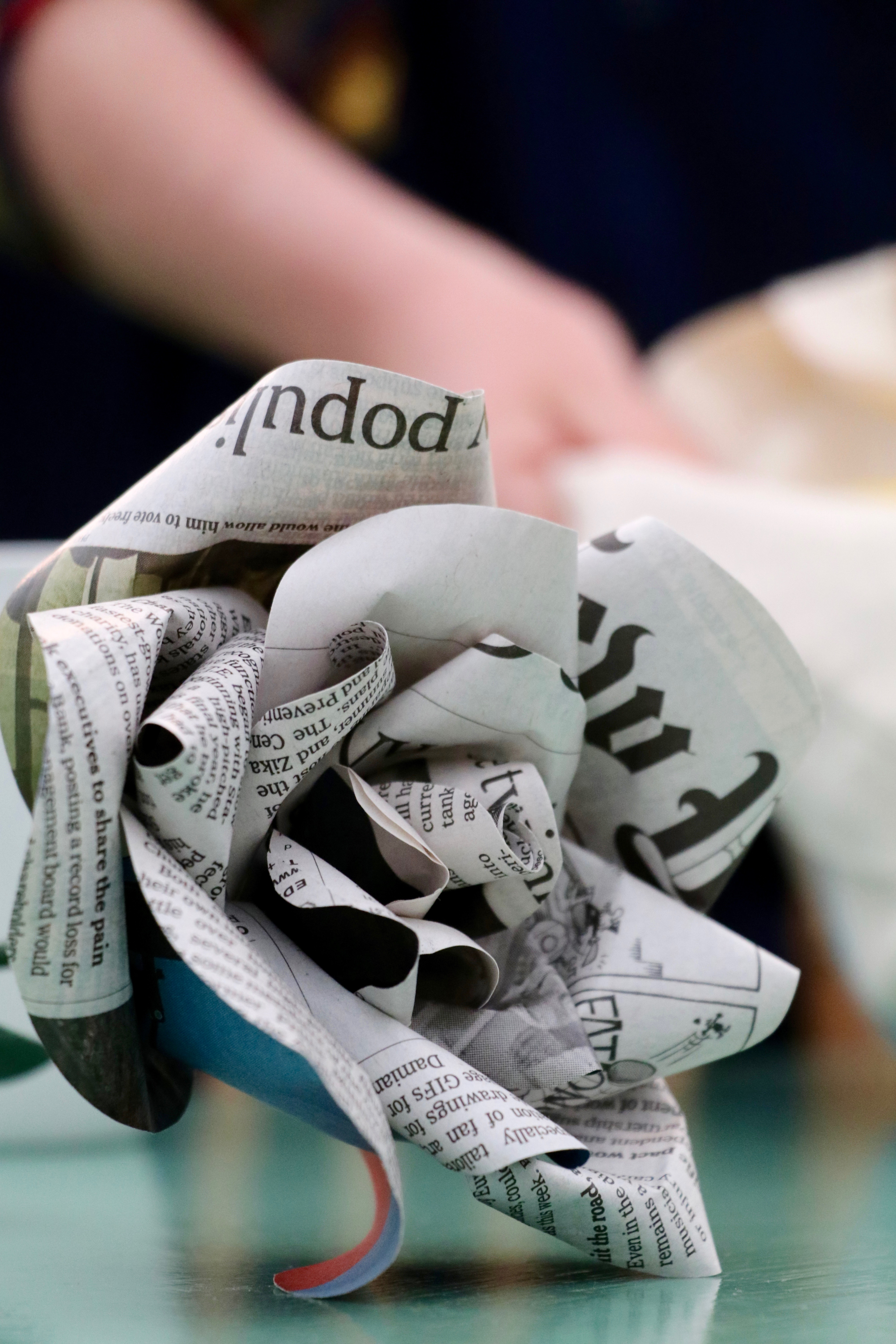
Newspaper rose, given to artists after their presentations

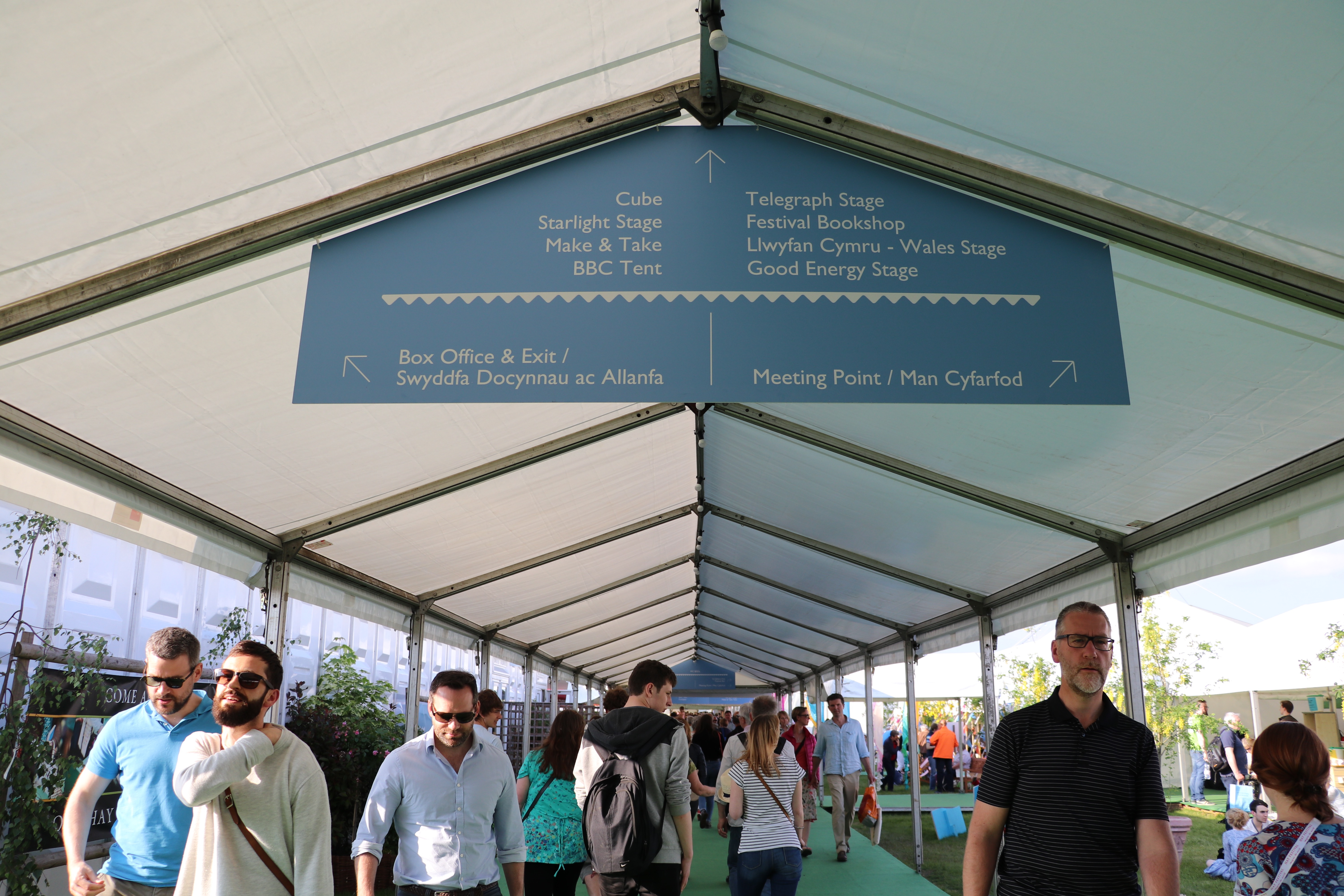
Halls of the festival

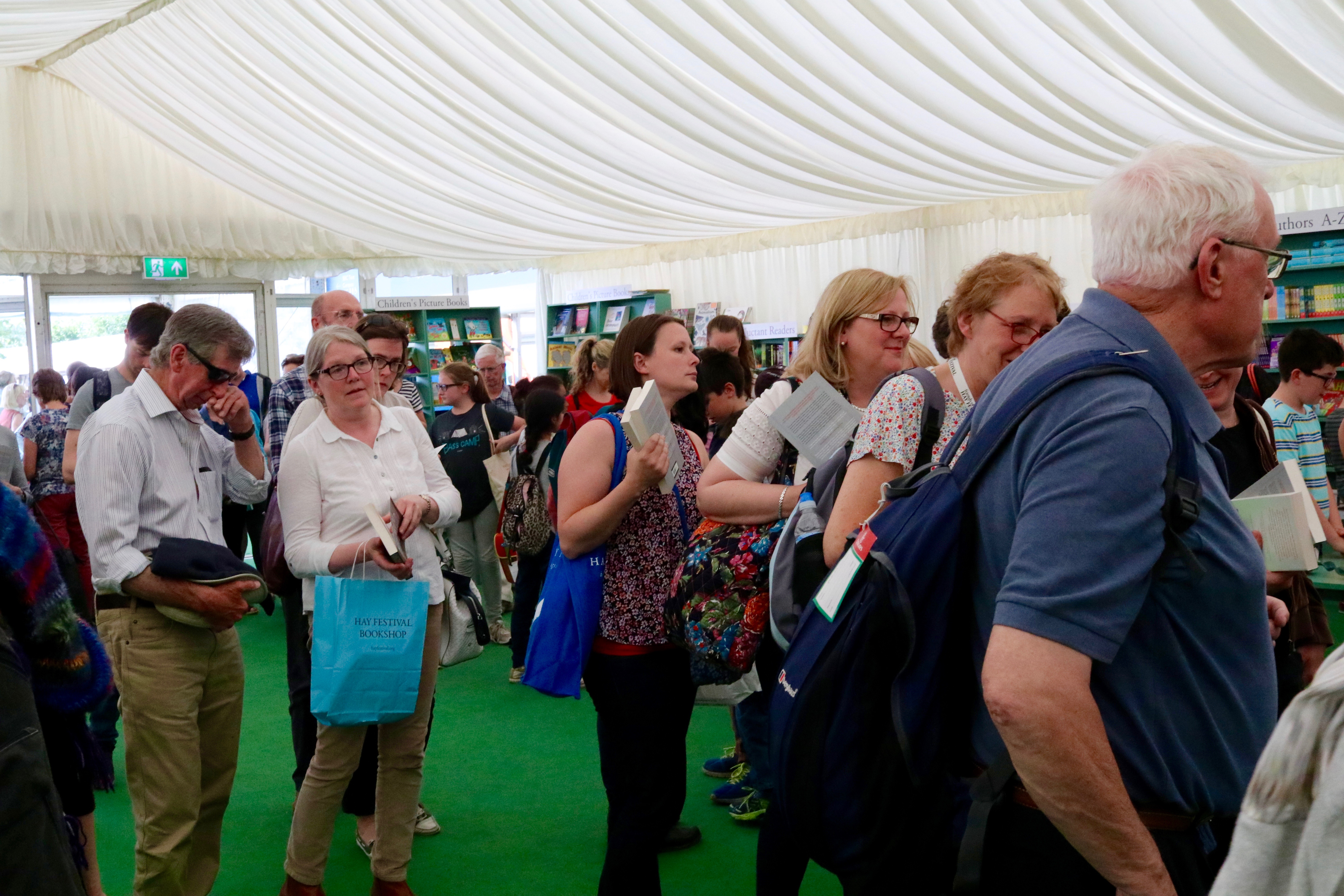
Attendees line up to meet authors at book signings

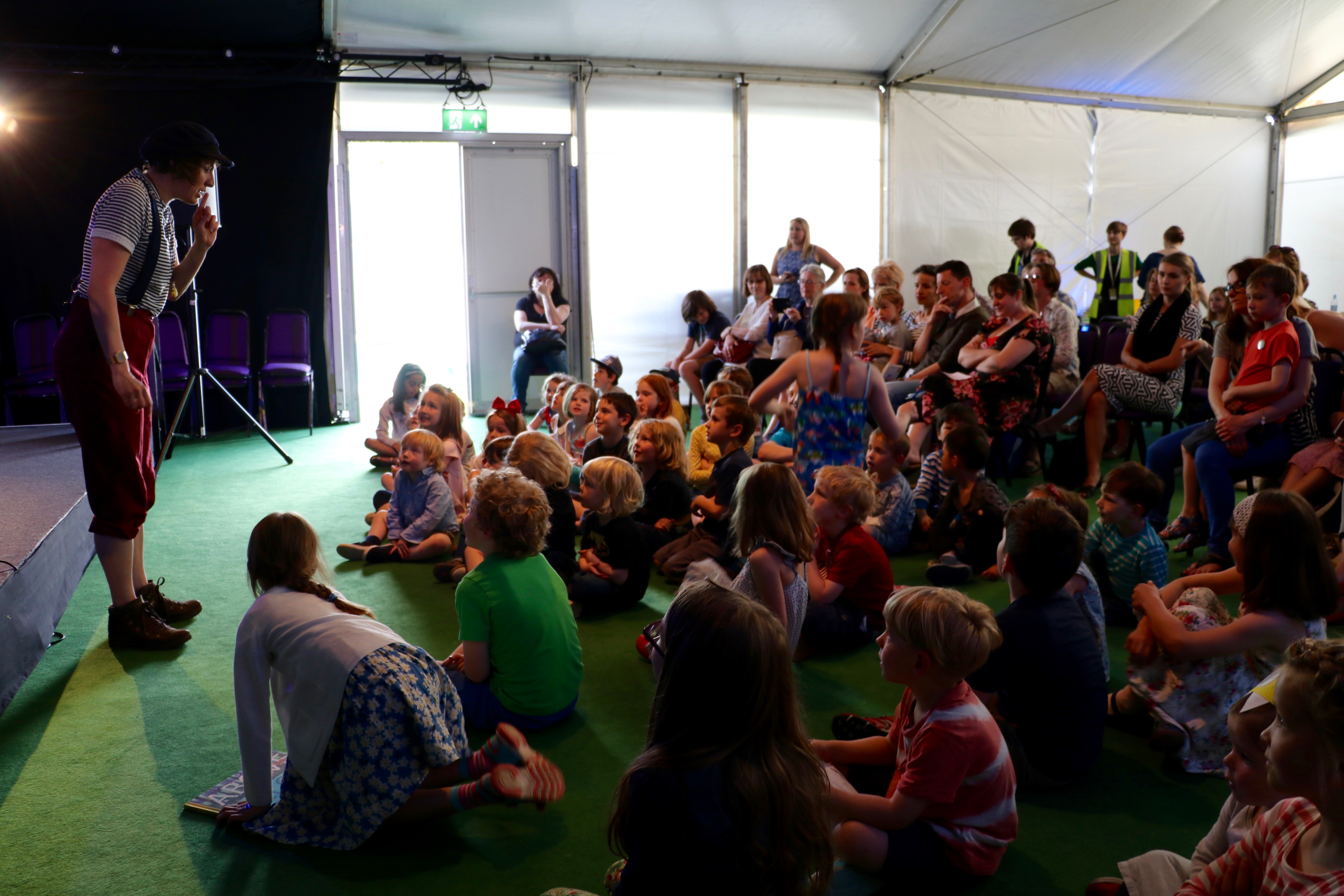
Performer Fleur Alexander leads a session for kids at Hay Days

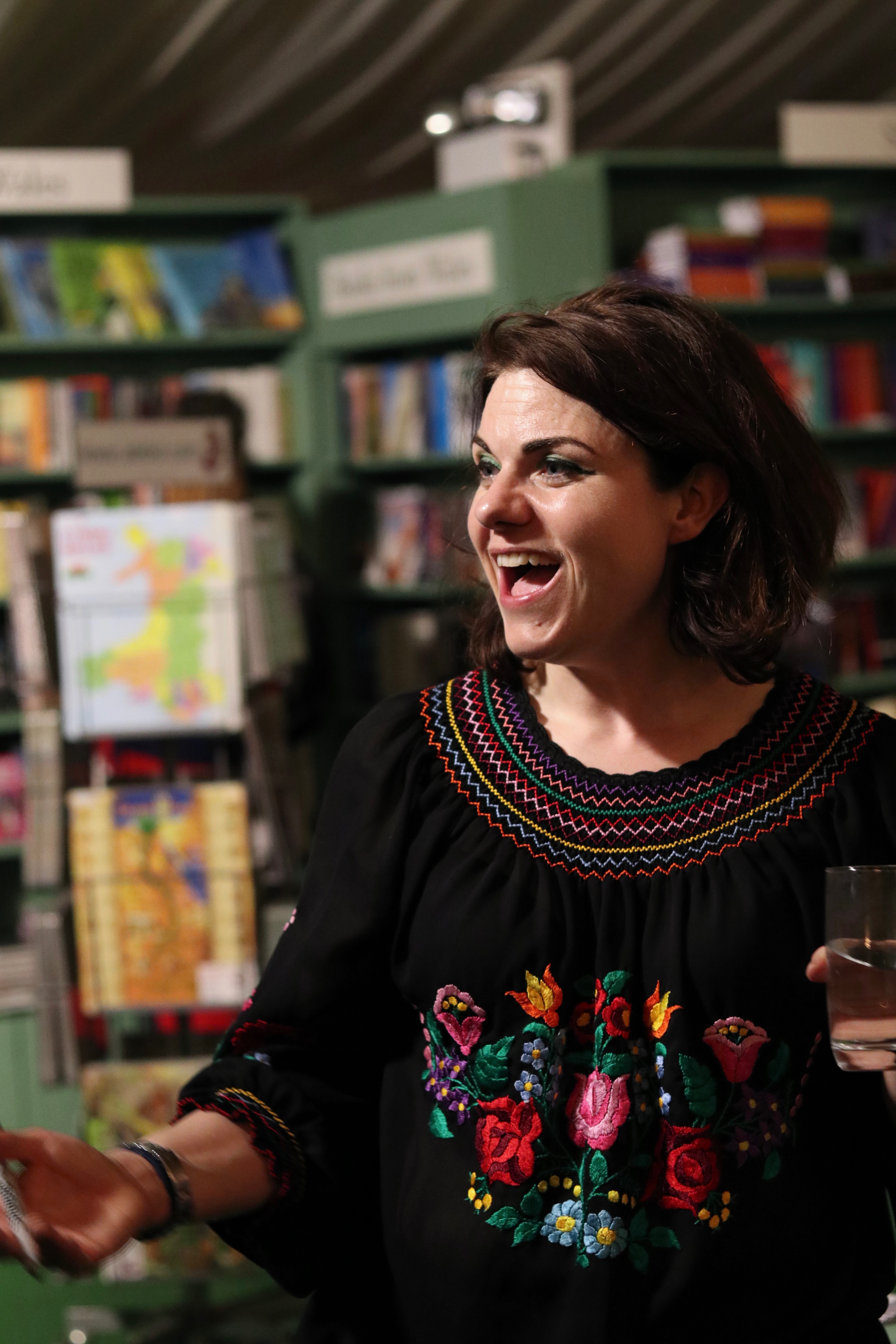
Writer Caitlin Moran interacting with fans after her talk

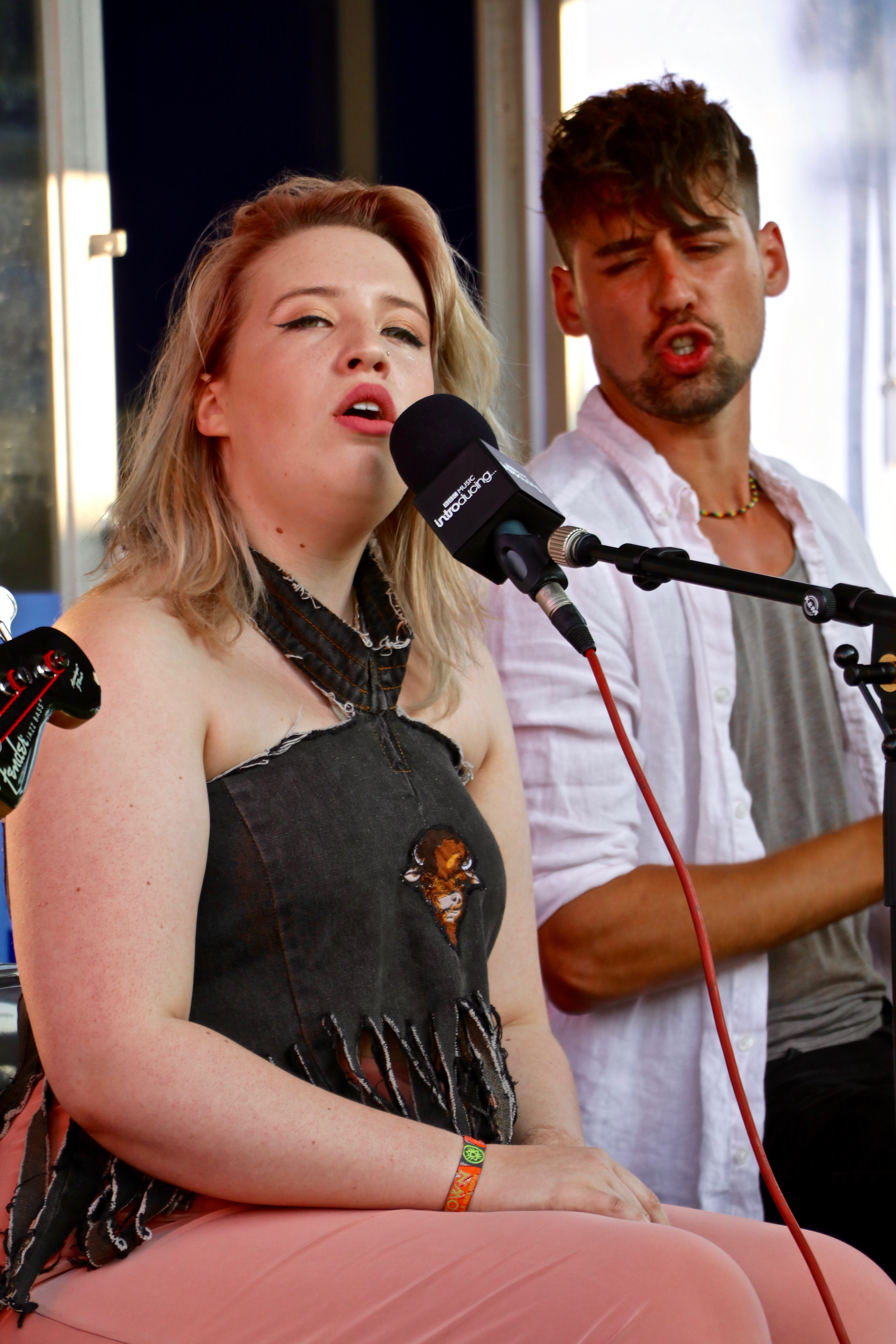
Band at the BBC tent
Hay Festival 2016

Hay Festival 2016

== International editions and forums ==
Hay Festival has grown to the extent that it is carried out in different corners around the world:

- Arequipa, Peru
- Jericó, Colombia
- Cartagena, Colombia
- Querétaro, Mexico
- Segovia, Spain

There are also smaller editions worldwide, called "forums". These are meant to hold a day or two of panels and group discussion:

- Dallas, United States
- Moquegua, Peru
- Panama City, Panama
- Medellín, Colombia
- Sevilla, Spain
- Ayacucho, Peru
- Santiago de Chile, Chile

== See also ==
- Book trade in the United Kingdom
- Books in the United Kingdom
