= Art Cure =

2026 non-fiction book by Daisy Fancourt

- Book cover
- Author: Daisy Fancourt
- Language: English
- Subject: Arts and health
- Genre: Popular science
- Publisher: Cornerstone Press (UK); Celadon Books (US)
- Publication date: 2026
- Publication place: United Kingdom
- Media type: Print
- Pages: 352

Art Cure: The Science of How the Arts Save Lives (published in the United Kingdom as Art Cure: The Science of How the Arts Transform Our Health) is a 2026 popular science book by Daisy Fancourt, a professor of psychobiology and epidemiology at University College London. Cornerstone Press published the UK edition on 8 January 2026; Celadon Books published the US edition the following month. It is her first trade book. The book was shortlisted for the 2026 Women's Prize for Non-Fiction.

== Summary ==
Fancourt argues that the arts function as a "forgotten fifth pillar of health" alongside diet, sleep, exercise and time spent in nature, and draws on research from neuroimaging, molecular biomarkers, wearable sensors, cognitive assessments and electronic health records to support the claim. She discusses effects she attributes to arts participation across mental health, brain health, movement, pain and stress management, and longevity, and states that engaging with the arts for as little as thirty to sixty minutes a week can produce measurable benefits. The book combines this research with individual case studies, including a woman with multiple mental illnesses whose drawing classes contributed to a period of recovery, and draws on Fancourt's earlier work leading hospital music programmes before she moved into research. She is director of the World Health Organization's Collaborating Centre on Arts and Health.

== Reception ==
Kirkus Reviews called it an inspiring book grounded in persuasive science. In The Art Newspaper, Constanza Ontiveros Valdés praised "Fancourt’s clarity in explaining complex concepts is notable", while Ana Somers wrote “Daisy Fancourt…has raised the study of the effects of the arts on health to a level of statistical credibility that might convince even Mark Twain". The book was a Sunday Times bestseller in the UK and was named the Bookseller's Non-Fiction Book of the Month and a Waterstones non-fiction pick.
