= Cristina Fuentes La Roche =

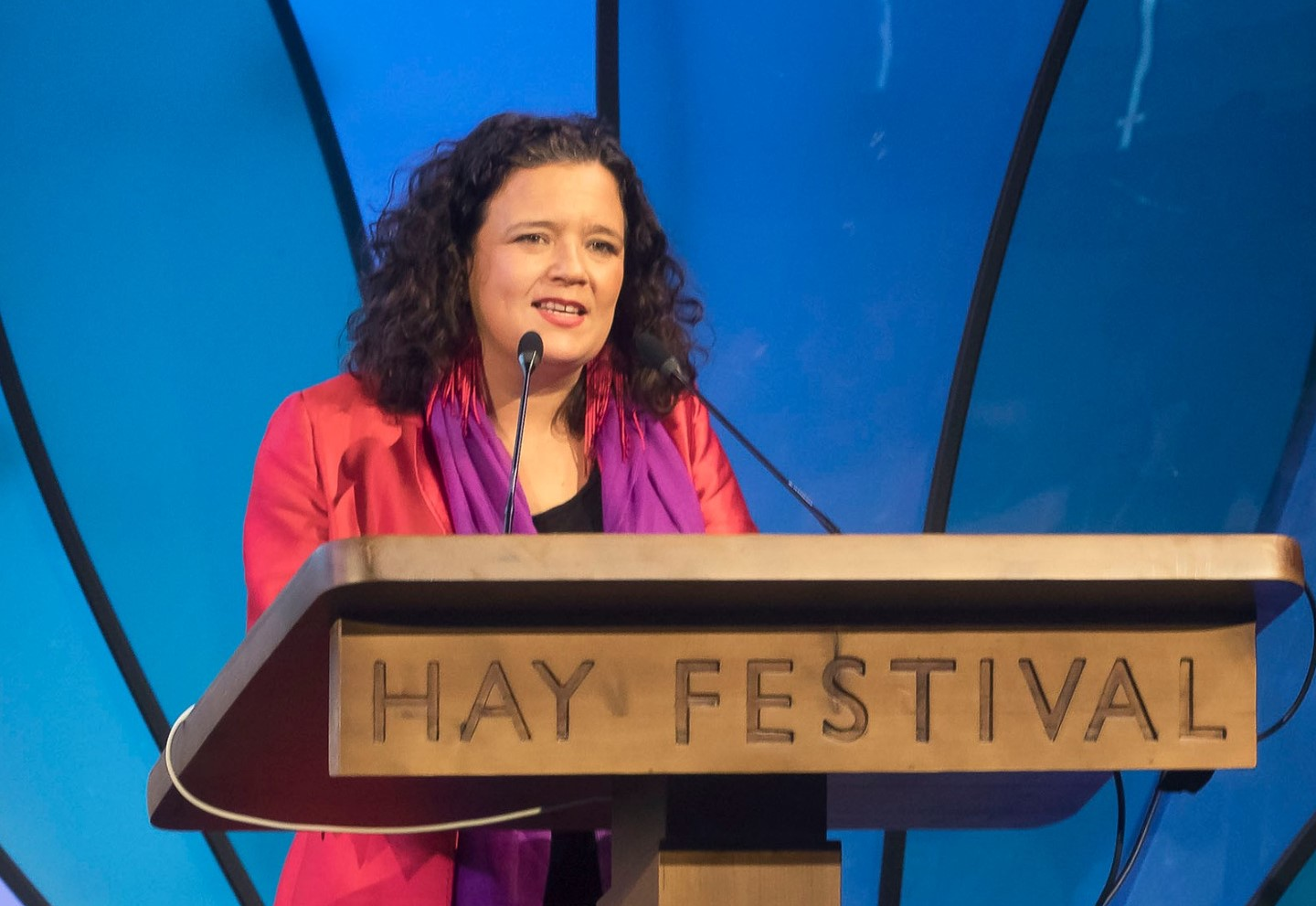
- Occupation: International director
- Known for: Hay Festival

Cristina Fuentes La Roche OBE is International Director at Hay Festival, which she has worked at since 2005. She has been involved in creating and directing these festivals in areas including Colombia, Spain, Mexico, Ukraine, Lebanon, and Perú.

== Career ==
Fuentes La Roche’s early career had her working three years at Canning House, and was later the Director of the National Events at Arts and Business for five years. In 2006, she created Hay Festival Cartagena de Indias, Colombia, Hay Festival Segovia, Spain (where she served as a co-director), and in 2010, Hay Festival Querétaro in Mexico. She later worked on Hay Festival Beirut, Lebanon since 2011, though it has since been interrupted. In 2015, she began work on Hay Festival Arequipa, Perú since 2015. She has also been responsible for multiple projects which sought to promote upcoming literary young talent. These included Bogotá39 in both 2007 and 2017, Beirut39 in 2010, and Africa39 in 2014 at the Port Harcourt Unesco World Book Capital. In 2015, she managed Mexico20, Aarhus39, and in 2020 Europa28.

== Honours ==
Fuentes La Roche has received multiple honours.

- In 2015, she served as a jude of the Independent Foreign Fiction Prize.
- Fuentes La Roche was awarded in 2019 an Order of the British Empire for her service in promoting British culture and values in the Spanish-speaking world.
- In 2020, She collected the Princess of Asturias Awards for Communication and Humanities, which was awarded to the Hay Festival.
- In 2021, she served as a judge of the Alfaguara Prize.

== Selected articles ==
- Generosidad y valentía de Salman Rushdie, Milenio
- Generosidad y valentía de Salman Rushdie, El Periódico
- Un festival literario donde resuenan las bombas, El Periódico
- En memoria de Victoria Amelina, El Periódico
- En memoria de la escritora ucraniana Victoria Amelina, El Tiempo
- "Mirar a las mujeres que miran a la guerra": la pasión de Victoria Amelina, la escritora ucraniana muerta en Kramatorsk tras seis días en coma, BBC
- Viaje al corazón de Hay-on-Wye, donde nació el Hay Festival, El Tiempo
- "Imaginar el mundo de mañana", por Cristina Fuentes La Roche, El Comercio
