= Madhumita Murgia =

Journalist and writer

- At SXSW London, 3 June 2026
- Born: Bengaluru, India
- Citizenship: India; United Kingdom
- Education: University of Oxford
- Occupations: Journalist; Author
- Years active: 2010–present
- Employer: Financial Times
- Known for: First AI Editor at the Financial Times; Author of Code Dependent
- Notable work: Code Dependent: Living in the Shadow of AI (2024)
- Title: AI Editor
- Awards: Shortlisted for the inaugural Women's Prize for Non-Fiction (2024)

Madhumita Murgia is a writer specialising in artificial intelligence. In February 2023 she was appointed as the first AI Editor of the Financial Times.

== Early life and education ==
Murgia grew up in Mumbai, India. She studied biology at the University of Oxford and worked there on AIDS vaccine research before taking an MA in science journalism at New York University.

== Career ==
Murgia joined the Financial Times in 2016 and was its European technology correspondent before taking her present role. She was previously tech editor at The Telegraph and associate editor of Wired UK. In 2017 she gave a TEDx talk at Exeter, on "How data brokers sell your identity".

Her book Code Dependent was shortlisted for the 2024 Women's Prize for Non-Fiction. The Guardian's reviewer described it as "an account of how the everyday algorithms we have already learned to live beside are changing us: from the people paid (not much) to make sense of vast datasets, to the unintended consequences of the biases they contain", and "the story of a dystopia we are already living in". The Reading Agency noted that "Through the voices of ordinary people in places far removed from Silicon Valley, Code Dependent explores the impact of a set of powerful, flawed, and often exploitative technologies on individuals, communities, and our wider society".

== Selected publications ==
- Code Dependent: Living in the shadow of AI (2024, Picador: ISBN 978-1529097306)
