= Women's Prize for Non-Fiction =

Literary award launched in 2023

Women's Prize for Fiction
- Awarded for: Best narrative non-fiction book written in English by a woman of any nationality, published in the UK
- Sponsored by: Findmypast (2023– )
- Location: United Kingdom
- Presented by: Women's Prize Trust
- First award: 2024
- Website: womensprize.com/prizes/womens-prize-for-non-fiction/

The Women’s Prize for Non-Fiction is a prize for non-fiction writing by women, a sister prize to the Women's Prize for Fiction. It was announced in February 2023 and was first awarded in 2024, for books published in 2023. Its main prize of £30,000 will be funded for three years by the Charlotte Aitken Trust, and the winner will also receive a statuette named the Charlotte. It was announced in June 2023 that the inaugural sponsor of the prize would be the family tree company Findmypast.

Kate Mosse, announcing the launch of the prize, said it was "not about taking the spotlight away from the brilliant male writers, it's about adding the women in."

The prize entry criteria state that: "Any woman writing in English – whatever her nationality, country of residence, age or subject matter – is eligible. Books must be published in the United Kingdom between 1 April in the year the Prize calls for entries, and 31 March the following year, when the Prize is announced. Books from all narrative non-fiction categories intended for general readership, commonly known as ‘trade non-fiction’, are encouraged, and the judging panel considers the titles submitted using the guiding tenets of excellence, originality and accessibility."

Five women make up the panel of judges. The 2024 judges were historian Suzannah Lipscomb (chair), fair fashion campaigner Venetia La Manna, academic, author and consultant, Professor Nicola Rollock, biographer and journalist Anne Sebba, and author and 2018 winner of the Women's Prize for Fiction Kamila Shamsie.

The first longlist for the Women's Prize for Non-Fiction, of 16 titles, was announced on 15 February 2024. The Guardian noted that the subject matter of the longlisted books included "Capitalism, artificial intelligence, Renaissance history and motherhood." The shortlist was announced on 27 March 2024 and the winner on 13 June 2024.

The 2025 judges are journalist, author & broadcaster Kavita Puri (chair), writer & broadcaster Leah Broad, novelist & critic Elizabeth Buchan, writer & environmental academic Dr Elizabeth-Jane Burnett, and author of the newsletter The Hyphen, Emma Gannon.

The 2025 longlist of 16 titles was announced in February 2025; the announcement said that "readers will find agenda-setting reportage on contemporary issues alongside revisionist histories and myth-busting biographies; memoirs of self-determination and intimate narratives that shine a light on ordinary people combine with real-life criminal cases, notorious and forgotten, whilst a handful of the books defy genre-classification, weaving multiple disciplines into one compelling narrative work."

== Winners and shortlisted writers ==
Women's Prize for Non-fiction winners and shortlist, 2024-
Year	Author	Title	Result	Ref.
2024	Naomi Klein	Doppelganger	Winner	
2024	Laura Cumming	Thunderclap	Shortlist	
2024	Noreen Masud	A Flat Place	Shortlist	
2024	Tiya Miles	All That She Carried	Shortlist	
2024	Madhumita Murgia	Code Dependent	Shortlist	
2024	Safiya Sinclair	How to Say Babylon	Shortlist	
2025	Rachel Clarke	The Story of a Heart: Two Families, One Heart, and a Medical Miracle	Winner	
2025	Neneh Cherry	A Thousand Threads	Shortlist	
2025	Chloe Dalton	Raising Hare	Shortlist	
2025	Clare Mulley	Agent Zo: The Untold Story of a Fearless World War II Resistance Fighter	Shortlist	
2025	Helen Scales	What the Wild Sea Can Be: The Future of the World’s Ocean	Shortlist	
2025	Yuan Yang	Private Revolutions: Four Women Face China's New Social Order	Shortlist	
2026	Lyse Doucet	The Finest Hotel in Kabul: A People’s History of Afghanistan	Winner	
2026	Daisy Fancourt	Art Cure: The Science of How the Arts Transform Our Health	Shortlist	
2026	Judith Mackrell	Artists, Siblings, Visionaries: The lives and loves of Gwen and Augustus John	Shortlist	
2026	Jane Rogoyska	Hotel Exile: Paris in the Shadow of War	Shortlist	
2026	Arundhati Roy	Mother Mary Comes to Me	Shortlist	
2026	Ece Temelkuran	Nation of Strangers: Rebuilding Home in the 21st Century	Shortlist	
