= Yuan Yang =

British politician (born 1990)

Yuan Yang MP
- 杨缘
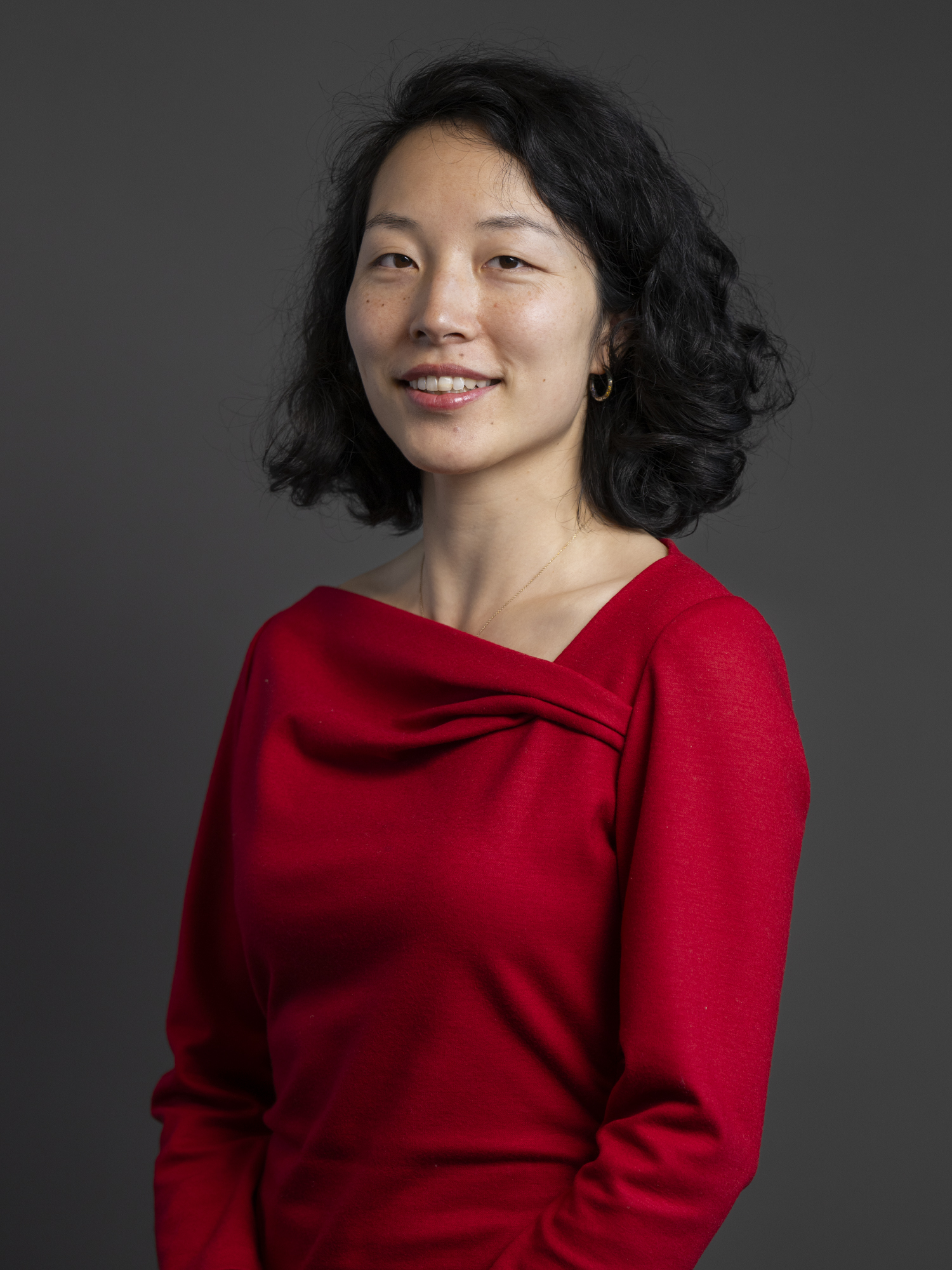
- Official portrait, 2024

Member of Parliament for Earley and Woodley
- Incumbent
- Assumed office 4 July 2024
- Preceded by: Constituency created
- Majority: 848 (1.9%)

Personal details
- Born: 1990 (age 35–36) Ningbo, Zhejiang, China
- Citizenship: United Kingdom
- Party: Labour
- Education: Bradford Grammar School; Balliol College, Oxford (BA); London School of Economics (MSc)

Chinese name
- Traditional Chinese: 楊緣
- Simplified Chinese: 杨缘
Transcriptions
Standard Mandarin
- Hanyu Pinyin: Yáng yuán

Yuan Yang (Chinese: 杨缘; born 1990) is a British Labour Party politician, economist and journalist serving as Member of Parliament for Earley and Woodley since 2024. Yang is the first mainland Chinese-born Briton MP, and the third of Chinese ethnicity after Alan Mak and Sarah Owen.

She was formerly the UK-based Europe–China correspondent for the Financial Times.

== Early life and education ==
Yang was born in Ningbo, Zhejiang, China, growing up in the southwestern Sichuan province. She was raised by her maternal grandparents in a work unit (danwei). At the age of four, she moved to the north of England with her parents – moving between Manchester and Leeds. Yang became "very passionate about writing" as a child, and explained that her passion was "encouraged by my teachers and by a group called The Yorkshire Writing Squad that I joined as a teenager".

Yang received a bursary to attend the fee-paying Bradford Grammar School, graduating in 2008. She studied for a bachelor's degree in Philosophy, Politics and Economics at Balliol College, Oxford, graduating in 2011 with first-class honours. She was the sabbatical women's officer in the Oxford Student Union.

During the 2008 financial crisis, she co-founded Rethinking Economics, a non-profit campaign that Yang described as coming from the belief that "students should be able to choose among different schools of thought" with regards to economics education. Yang expressed the hope that the campaign would provide a space for students wanting to address "real world economic issues, broader questions of economic justice and reforming the real economy."

Yang attended the London School of Economics from 2012–2013, studying for an MSc in economics. She studied at Peking University in 2013 as part of a Chinese government sponsored programme.

== Journalism ==
In a 2021 interview with Quartz, Yang noted that she initially intended to become a poet but pivoted to journalism by accident.

She began her journalism career as a Marjorie Deane intern in the economics section of The Economist magazine.

In 2016, she moved to China as an economics correspondent for the Financial Times. She has served as deputy Beijing bureau chief for the FT, and covered China's technology sector and economy. Yang is also a regular contributor to BBC News.

In May 2024, Yang's book Private Revolutions was published by Bloomsbury Publishing. The book is about the coming of age of four women born in China in the 1980s and 1990s, in a society about to change beyond recognition. It was shortlisted for the 2025 Women's Prize for Non-Fiction.

== Political career ==
Before she was an MP, Yang backed the rights of Hongkongers in the United Kingdom and was critical of the Chinese government's 2020 Hong Kong national security law.

In December 2023, Yang was announced as the Labour Party candidate for Earley and Woodley in the 2024 general election. Her family had lived in Earley for 14 years prior to her selection. Yang explained that part of her motivation for standing derived from witnessing "the damage austerity has done to our community".

In July 2024, she won the newly created constituency with 18,209 votes, beating the Conservative party candidate who received 17,361 votes, and becoming the UK's first mainland Chinese-born MP. As Yang is a Quaker, she was sworn in to parliament by taking a solemn affirmation on 10 July 2024.

In October 2024, Yang was elected as a member of the Treasury Select Committee, on which she has raised issues with the quality of labour-force inactivity data. In November 2024 she became chair of the All-Party Parliamentary Group for Social Science and Policy.

Yang campaigned in 2025 for Reading FC to be sold, in response to a ownership crisis. In February 2025, alongside fan group Sell Before We Dai, she ran a petition calling for an inquiry into Reading FC’s absent owner which garnered over 10,000 signatures. In March 2025 Yang secured a backbench parliamentary debate on the financial sustainability of football.

Yang has supported tougher regulation of property management companies.

In April 2025, Yang was detained, questioned, and denied entry to Israel alongside fellow Labour MP Abtisam Mohamed and two members of staff from the British NGOs who were hosting the delegation; the two MPs stated they were attempting to visit the occupied West Bank as part of a Parliamentary delegation. Speaking about the incident in the House of Commons, Middle East Minister Hamish Falconer said: “They had both been granted entry clearance in advance of travelling to Israel [...] their treatment is unacceptable and deeply concerning”. The Foreign Secretary, David Lammy, responded to the incident saying: “It is unacceptable, counterproductive, and deeply concerning that two British MPs on a parliamentary delegation to Israel have been detained and refused entry by the Israeli authorities."

On 11 May 2026, she called on Keir Starmer to resign after the poor results in the 2026 United Kingdom local elections.

Parliament of the United Kingdom
New constituency	Member of Parliament for Earley and Woodley; 2024–present	Incumbent
