= Peter Florence =

British festival director (born 1964)

Peter Florence CBE, Hon. FRSL
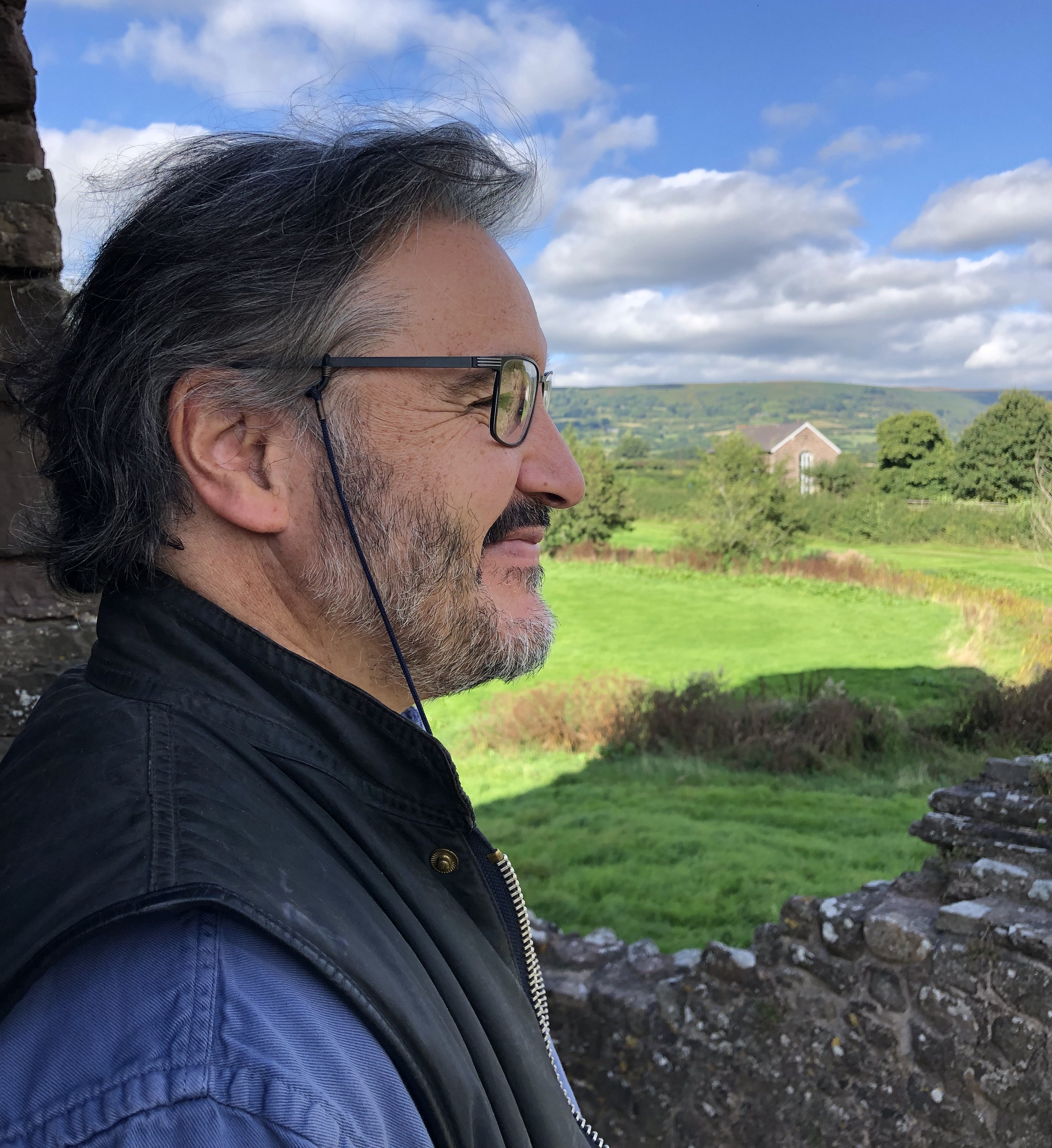
- Florence in Powys, Wales
- Born: Peter Kenrick Florence; 4 October 1964 (age 62)
- Education: Ipswich School; Jesus College, Cambridge; University of Paris
- Occupation: Festival director
- Known for: Founding the Hay Festival
- Spouse: Becky Shaw
- Children: 4
- Parent(s): Norman Florence and Rhoda Lewis
- Relatives: Trevor Jones (cousin)

Peter Kenrick Florence CBE (born 4 October 1964) is a British festival director, most notable for founding the Hay Festival with his father and mother, Norman Florence and Rhoda Lewis, funding the first festival with winnings from a poker game.

== Education ==
Peter Florence was educated at Ipswich School, Jesus College, Cambridge, and the University of Paris and has an MA degree in Modern and Medieval Literatures. He holds honorary doctorates from The Open University, Queen Mary University of London, Worcester University and the University of Glamorgan, and is a Fellow of Hereford College of Arts, The Royal Welsh College of Music & Drama and the British-American Project, and an Honorary Fellow of Bangor University and of Cardiff University.

== Career ==
As well as the Hay Festival, Florence founded similar festivals around the world in Mantua, Segovia, the Alhambra Palace, Cartagena, Nairobi, Zacatecas, Thiruvananthapuram, Dhaka, Xalapa, Belfast and Paraty.

He co-founded, with David Campbell, the Bollinger Everyman Wodehouse Prize for Comic Fiction, which celebrated its 25th anniversary in 2025. He is also a trustee of the Baillie Gifford Prize for non-fiction.

He is the co-editor of the Oxtales and Oxtravels anthologies with Mark Ellingham of Profile Books, in partnership with Oxfam. Florence is a Friend of Oxfam.

He has written for a number of publications, including Index on Censorship, The Guardian, The Telegraph and The Spectator. A number of his interviews with writers appear in the Hay Festival's 30th-anniversary book Hay Festival Conversations. In 2024 he started XVx: Rugby stories. a substack on rugby, with diversions into his many other interests.

He continues his career as a programmer and speaker with annual appearances at Italy's Festivaletteratura, in Mantova, and as director of The Conversation, a regular series of talks on literature and social justice, at London's St Martin-in-the-Fields.

His international interests, centred on sustainability and inclusion, include co-founding, with Tamar Brüggeman, a carbon-capture project in Iceland. the European Festivals Forest,

He is a member of the European Festivals Association EFFE Jury., and has been a judge for both the EFA EFFE awards, for emerging artists, and the Perform Europe Sustainability and Inclusion awards.

== Controversies ==
Florence chaired the jury of the 2019 Man Booker Prize for Fiction, and notably defied the foundation's 1993-established rules, by awarding the prize to two authors. Bernardine Evaristo – the first black woman to be awarded the prize – shared the prize with Margaret Atwood.

In late July 2021, Florence resigned as director of the Hay Festival following an independent investigation that upheld a complaint of bullying against him. He had been suspended in October 2020. Florence commented: "I consider that my role had become untenable due to the conduct of the board and its insistence on holding a disciplinary hearing in my absence whilst I was off sick after a breakdown."

== Personal life ==
Florence and his wife Becky Shaw have four sons. They live in Ludlow. In 2026, he wrote a eulogy on his substack to their son, Morgan, who died a week after his 21st birthday.

He is cousin to Trevor Jones the South African composer.

== Honours ==
Florence was made a "Colombiano de Corazon" by President Álvaro Uribe for his work in Colombia.

He was awarded an MBE in 2005 for services to Arts and Culture.

He was awarded a CBE in 2018 for services to Literature and Charity.

He was elected an honorary fellow of The Royal Society of Literature in 2018.
