= Chloe Dalton (author) =

British writer and foreign policy specialist

Chloe Dalton is a British writer and foreign policy specialist.

Her first published book, Raising Hare (2024, Canongate: ISBN 978-1805302711) describes her experience of rearing a leveret, or young hare, during the COVID-19 pandemic. It was the category winner for nature writing and the overall winner of the 2025 Wainwright Prize. It was also shortlisted for the 2025 Women's Prize for Non-Fiction, the 2025 Books Are My Bag Readers' Awards, and the British Book Awards Book of the Year: Non-fiction.

Her second book Pet is to be published in 2027 by Canongate Books. It considers the relationships between humans and pets and "seeks to inspire new thought on individual consciousness in how we perceive pets and their wild counterparts and question the complicated process of domestication".
