= Private Revolutions =

2024 book by Yuan Yang

Private Revolutions: Four Women Face China's New Social Order
- Author: Yuan Yang
- Genre: Memoir
- Publisher: Bloomsbury Publishing
- Publication date: 2024
- Pages: 320
- ISBN: 9781526655929

Private Revolutions: Four Women Face China's New Social Order is a 2024 book written by British journalist Yuan Yang.

It is about the coming of age of four women born in China in the 1980s and 1990s and aims to unearth the identity of modern society in China.

The BBC named the book one of the 45 most anticipated of 2024.
