= Noreen Masud =

British writer and literary scholar

- Born: Pakistan
- Employer: University of Bristol

Academic background
- Education: University of Oxford
- Thesis: Aphorism in Stevie Smith (2017)
- Academic advisors: Sally Bayley & Laura Marcus

Academic work
- Notable works: A Flat Place: Moving Through Empty Landscapes, Naming Complex Trauma (2023)
- Website: www.noreenmasud.com

Noreen Masud is a British writer and literary scholar.

== Early life ==
Masud was born to a British mother and a Pakistani father in Lahore, Pakistan. Her paternal ancestral roots are in Shopian, Kashmir, whilst her mother is Scottish and English. As a teenager, Masud moved to Britain with her mother and siblings.

== Career ==
Masud is a lecturer at the University of Bristol. Her work has been published in The Times Literary Supplement and Salon. Her monograph Stevie Smith and the Aphorism: Hard Language (2022) won The Modernist Studies Association's First Book Prize.

She has been on BBC Radio 4's In Our Time.

Her memoir A Flat Place: Moving Through Empty Landscapes, Naming Complex Trauma (2023) describes her childhood in Pakistan, moving to Scotland aged 15, and the complex post-traumatic stress disorder from which she suffers. A Flat Place was shortlisted for the 2023 Charlotte Aitken Young Writer of the Year Award, and was a Book of the Year in The New Yorker, The Guardian and The Sunday Times. In 2024, it was shortlisted for the Women's Prize for Non-Fiction.

== Works ==
- Stevie Smith and the Aphorism: Hard Language. Oxford English Monographs. OUP Oxford. 2022. ISBN 978-0-19-264924-9.
- A Flat Place: Moving Through Empty Landscapes, Naming Complex Trauma. Melville House. 2023. ISBN 978-1-68589-024-7.
