= BBC Two launch ident =

Television ident for BBC Two (1964–1967)

The ident endboard

The launch ident was a television station identification used by BBC Two between its launch night in April 1964 and the launch of a full colour service in December 1967.

== Launch ==
BBC Two is the second BBC channel and the third channel to air in the UK.

On 20 April 1964, BBC 2 planned to launch an evening of programmes beginning at 7:20 pm. However, 35 minutes before the new channel went on air, a power failure spread through most of London, affecting BBC Television Centre, where BBC 2's programme control was based. BBC 1 and BBC News were unaffected as they were still based at Alexandra Palace. The first signs of the new identity were slides containing the BBC 2 box logo with the caption 'Will start shortly'. The first night's transmission consisted of this slide interspersed with news bulletins, presented by Gerald Priestland, from the news room at Alexandra Palace, which featured the new logo in the background. At 10 pm, the launch night was abandoned and the programme line-up was aired the following evening. The first programme aired was Play School at 11 am.

Prior to the launch, the channel was represented by two kangaroo mascots, called Hullabaloo and Custard. Hullabaloo, a mother, represented BBC 1, while Custard, her joey, represented the new BBC 2. Hullabaloo was so called because BBC 1 was entertaining and about song and dance, while Custard was named such because, as one person at the BBC stated, "everything goes with custard".

== Components of look ==
The ident used with the look was a black, white and grey affair. It was an animation that started with grey and black lines flying in from left and right before the white numeral '2' in a black box flies from the top with the BBC logo in the same shade as the bottom line, flies up from the bottom. This animation is accompanied by a trumpeted fanfare, composed by Freddie Phillips, and which was based on the morse code translation of 'B-B-C-2'.

Accompanying this look, static captions of the logo fully formed were used, alongside slides with the day written to the right of the BBC logo. Other slides were used featuring the '2' and BBC logo to the left of the screen with grey and white stripes on the right, which occasionally also featured the days of the week on them. A device used to switch between them was a large numeral 2, which would rotate to reveal one of these slides. These were filmed from the BBC 2 Noddy room and broadcast live.

The clock face used for this era featured a black background clock with the '2' and BBC logo on the left hand side with a black clock face on the right. Every minute was marked in white, with large Roman numerals every five minute mark. There was also a rarely-seen variant with a grey background.

BBC 2 began showing programmes in colour on 1 July 1967, although only a small number of programmes were in colour initially, with the rest still in black and white. Thus, the black-and-white branding continued to be used, albeit with electronically added colour for colour programmes, and would only be retired upon the launch of a full colour service on 2 December 1967.

In addition to all of this, BBC 2 used in-vision continuity for at least the first few months of its existence, broadcasting the announcer in studio Pres B, Television Centre. The studio featured a desk with BBC 2 branding with the day appearing on the wall behind, as well as highlights of the upcoming programmes. This practice was abandoned by BBC 1 and 2 at about the same time, and the studio vacated.

Promotional and programme slide styles were not uniform at this time and conformed to no specific design. At the time of BBC Two's launch, a number of testcards were designed to conform to the new 625 line platform. The main one used from BBC 2's launch, but dropped with the advent of colour (but continued in regions that still had monochrome until 1976), was Test Card E.

== Reuse of the ident ==
The ident was reused during Afternoon Classics in 2013, on BBC Two, and made its last appearance in December 2016. It was also reused in Northern Ireland during the 90th anniversary of the establishment of BBC Northern Ireland in 2014. More recently, on 20 April 2024, it was reused in the link preceding 60 Years of Songs, a special programme on the night of the channel's sixtieth anniversary.

== See also ==
- BBC Two "Cube" ident
- BBC One pre-1969 idents

Preceded by N/A	BBC television idents 21 April 1964 – 2 December 1967	Succeeded by Cube 2
