= BBC Two "Cube" ident =

Television ident for BBC Two (1967–1974)

The first version of the Cube 2

The Cube 2 was an ident used by BBC Two between 2 December 1967 and c. 28 December 1974. It featured a stylised "2" that rotated on screen.

== Launch ==
Colour programmes were first shown regularly on BBC 2 from 1 July 1967, (Note: Some programmes, including Late Night Line-Up, were 'unofficially' broadcast in colour prior to the launch date.) (Note: Radio Times listings did not indicate colour programmes until late September 1967.) starting with that year's Wimbledon Championships. Colour programming was initially limited to about five hours a week, (Note: This was dubbed the 'colour launching period' by the BBC.) and continued to be accompanied by the channel's launch presentation, with colour added electronically. It wasn't until later in the year, on 2 December, that a full colour service was launched, comprising the majority of the day's programmes. (Note: The first programme to be broadcast as part of this service was a special production of Billy Smart's Circus.) This was heralded by the launch of a new symbol and surrounding presentation.

Logo used in the ident.

== Components of the look ==
The ident was originally a cube with a "2" on each face, each a different colour. The ident would start by three light spots of red, green and blue, the three primary colours for television. These light spots then merge to form a white spot. Around this spot, a blue numeral "2" would form up by drawing it. The "COLOUR" legend would then appear below the 2, and the 2 would begin rotating to reveal other colour 2s, in the order blue, red, green and white. This ident would continue to rotate against the black background. The ident was formed by an animated startup and a film of a mechanical model, with the whole thing being played off a recording. This ident was rarely seen outside of startup – instead programmes were usually linked with slides superimposed over the clock by means of a split-screen.

The animated ident was replaced at some point – possibly the same day BBC 1 launched its colour service – with a static caption showing both the '2' logo and 'COLOUR' legend in cyan, though a live mechanical model similar to the one mentioned below may also have been used.

The ident was modified in late 1971 when both channels' presentation were brought into line. The cubed "2" was changed so all the colours were cyan blue, with the "2" now spinning above a line with an italic "COLOUR" legend. A variety of colour schemes were used: the background could either be black or blue and the line and "COLOUR" caption were either white or cyan. These idents were mechanical, and filmed live as required from the BBC 2 Noddy room and lasted as long as necessary, although the ident would usually stop spinning after a while. The colour was added electronically through the Noddy process used on the BBC 1 ident at the time.

Two clocks accompanied the look: the first lasted as long as the original ident and the second accompanied the mechanical idents. The first was a modified version of the last time-piece and featured to the right of the screen, a large clock face with markers at every minute mark and with Roman numerals for every five minutes. To the left, the dotted '2' logo and below it, the corporate BBC 2 logo, with the legend "COLOUR" underneath, in a different typeface to that seen on the ident. The clock and logo were coloured cyan on black, a colour scheme that would later be used by BBC 1 upon the launch of colour on that channel in 1969. An alternative version was used before unscheduled Service Information programmes which featured only the 'BBC 2 COLOUR' logo and a starting time below; this variant was coloured yellow on blue. The second clock matched that of BBC 1 and featured a clockface in the centre of the screen with the number markers being replaced by a set of double lines that got progressively thicker the further round the clock face. Below the clock was a horizontal line and the dotted '2' logo with 'COLOUR' to the right. (Note: This would mark the first time the BBC logo was entirely absent from both the ident and clock, which wouldn't happen again until 1979.) Like the previous clock, and BBC 1, this was coloured cyan on black. In late 1971, this was replaced with a clock more similar-looking to BBC 1's, with the dotted '2' logo replaced with the corporate BBC 2 logo, and 'COLOUR' in italic type. The colour scheme was now variable as it was on the main ident: the horizontal stripe and logo were either cyan or white, and the background blue or black, with the clock remaining in cyan.

Promotions at this point were not uniform and changed depending on requirements and time of year. The holding slides used for this period featured a cyan "2" logo located at the bottom left of the image, with a COLOUR legend in white below the 2 and programme information to the right of the 2, all of which were enclosed within a black bar at the bottom of the image. At some point in the early 1970s, the black bar was removed and the "2" logo was made white. Some slides used a '2' logo that lacked the 'COLOUR' tag, and the 'COLOUR' tag remained in its Swiss-style typeface until the presentation refresh at the end of 1974.

== Special idents ==
- Christmas 1967–1970 – Christmas idents were not used during this period, but Christmas slides were produced, including the cube 2 on the left of the screen (above the logo and the word "Colour") with a Christmas tree or a snowflake on the right.
- Christmas 1971 – The cube 2 with coloured swirls emanating from the centre, with the font reading "Christmas" underneath. (Note: Based on a description in Television magazine issue 471 (January 1990). No footage or photos survive.)
- Christmas 1972 – The cube 2 with tinsel around the edges of the screen, with the font reading "Christmas in Colour" underneath.
- Christmas 1973 – Possibly the same version as the following year; no footage exists, only photos.
- Christmas 1974 – The cube 2 with all sides orange rotating and decorated with stars and a bauble where the dot usually sits; the font underneath read either "Christmas Eve", "Christmas Day" or "Boxing Day", depending on the day.

Due to lack of video recordings from this era, and due to the common broadcasting practice of wiping old tapes for reuse, very few examples survive of this era. Examples, therefore, of special idents are almost non-existent.

== See also ==
- BBC Two launch ident
- BBC Two "Striped" ident
- History of BBC television idents

== Notes ==
Preceded by Launch ident	BBC television idents 2 December 1967 – 28 December 1974	Succeeded by Striped 2
