= BBC Four idents =

Television identifiers used by BBC Four

BBC Four, and its predecessor BBC Knowledge, are both channels operated by the BBC as cultural and knowledge based channels. Their visual identities therefore have been a result of this aim.

== BBC Knowledge ==
=== Ladders of Learning (1999–2000) ===
A ladders of learning ident

BBC Knowledge was launched on 1 June 1999 with the intent of creating a multimedia learning channel. The idea was that computers, interactive TV via the Red Button and television could come together to make a new, factual, learning channel for children and adults alike. The launch identity consisted of cartoon characters climbing 'ladders of learning' between clouds against an orange background. All the idents featured the station logo, which followed the BBC style design of the time by having the station name follow the BBC logo in upper case. This white logo would appear at the end of ident.

The idents all featured characters, drawn by Michael Sheehy, shown with items such as a magnifying glass, telescope or rolls of paper. Several variations of the ident were made featuring different characters prominent on the ladders of learning. The ident was also used as the background to programme menus with characters seen climbing the ladders of learning in the background with programme information overlaid and centred to accommodate widescreen. These characters could also be seen as stills on launch promotional material and on the BBC Knowledge website.

The channel launched with a Digital on-screen graphic (DOG), in line with the BBC practice at the time. However, different from the other channels which used the station logo, BBC Knowledge used the URL of their website 'www.bbc.co.uk/knowledge'. The use of this promoted the website tie in with the channel. The channel also used credit promotions where additional content or information is promoted over a programmes end credits, by reducing the credits to a smaller size and filling the information in the remaining space. Another style of presentation utilised was that of viewer videos, shown either as part of the shrinking credits, or between programmes.

The presentation for the channel as a whole was in 16:9 widescreen from launch, however all information was kept in a 4:3 safe area, so no information was lost to viewers watching on a 'full screen' television. Information included the logo, promotions and the DOG.

=== Circles (2000–2002) ===
In January 2000, following the approval of the new BBC Four, BBC Knowledge's programming was realigned to better reflect the new channel. A single ident was utilised instead featuring a circle made out of different materials which would move forward and off the screen at the viewer. These could be made with a variety of objects. The musical accompaniment followed the choral and instrumental style. This sequence lasted until the station went off air. Promotional style remained the same with the BBC Knowledge logo seen at the bottom. The DOG also changed to the BBC Knowledge logo.

=== Stranded idents ===
The channel had always utilised a stranded layout to make genres of programmes easy to find on the new channel. However, special idents began to appear for each strand from c.2000. These featured an object, before a fact about it related to the strand appears and ends on an image with the strand name shown clearly on screen, with a letter encircled at the centre of the screen. It is unclear whether these idents were replacements of the normal idents, or complementary to them, however it appears they complemented them, with these idents being used in the stranded sections, with the animated idents used for general interest programming.

Following the relaunch in 2000 and 2001, all different idents were dropped in favour of a single ident, featuring numerous circles made out of different structures reflecting the new strands.

== BBC Four ==
=== Improvised (2002–2005) ===
One of the improvised idents, used between 2002 and 2005

The BBC's "cultural" channel BBC Four was launched on 2 March 2002 as a successor to BBC Knowledge. As a result, the channel was to show a broad variety of programming. To show this, Lambie Nairn devised the idea of an improvised ident that reacted to the frequencies of continuity announcers' voices or the background music of the ident. As a result, no idents were ever the same, however variations were produced featuring different visualisations, such as semicircles, vibrating lines or shafts extending from the bottom surface.

The channel logo featured the new style of logo with the channel name 'Four' located in upper case inside a black box with the BBC logo above it. This logo was present in the bottom right corner of idents and promotions for the entire duration.

The launch slogan of the channel 'Everybody needs a place to think' was present on all launch promotions. Promotional style featured the BBC Four logo present throughout the promotion with the details appearing in white in the top right corner of the screen, aligned right. If the background image was too light, a translucent black box was placed over the top third of the screen. The channel also used a DOG, however this was not the new logo, but a one line style used by the previous channel with the BBC logo and 'FOUR' to the right of it in the same size.

=== Four sections (2005–present) ===
Swimming Pool ident introduced in 2005 (retired in 2016)

BBC Four's identity changed on 10 September 2005. These new idents, designed by Red Bee Media, featured an image made up of four parts but undistinguishable until something interacts within the scene. Idents included:

- Seagulls: Seagulls which fly between the pictures, often getting closer or further away than previous. (retired in 2016)
- Library: A girl climbs a ladder against a bookcase. As the ladder is moved, the ladder section in a different segment moves differently. Equally the girl may climb off the bottom of the screen to reappear at the top. In addition, whenever she replaced a book, another fell out in a different segment. Used from September 2005 to 2016, but later it returned in May 2020 until September 2021.
- Lake: A mountain scene against a lake where a drop of water causes ripples in more than one segment, before a drop rises from the sky/lake in another segment. Used from September 2005 to October 2021.
- Swimming Pool: A child in a swimming pool swimming with a ring. The views are from different angles, for example looking down from the air and underwater looking up at the surface. (retired in 2016)
- Flowers: Bees collecting nectar that appear elsewhere when flying across borders. Used from September 2005 to October 2021.
- Office: Staff are seen having an argument in an office; as an employee leaves one quarter of the screen, they appear in another section. (retired in 2016)

These are some of the idents that were launched since 2016 which it was used to introduce special programming:

- Cherry Blossom: Initially used during "Japan Season" and "Inner Peace", both in 2017. Now already in use as a regular ident.
- Minka: Initially used during "Japan Season" in 2017. Now already in use as a regular ident.
- Mount Fuji: Initially used during "Japan Season" in 2017. Now already in use as a regular ident.
- Home: Shows a rooftop of a house which it is divided into four when it was zoomed out. Initially used for the "Homes Season" in May 2016, but later used as a regular ident.
- Space: Shows the BBC Four logo steady and the background spinning in the outer space. Used from April 2017 to October 2021.
- Beacon: Used from May 2016 to October 2021.
- Trees: Used since May 2016.
- Television: This shows a retro television set in the countryside playing the Trees ident. Used from April 2017 to May 2021.
- Nebula: Initially used during "Space Season" in 2018. Now already in use as a regular ident until 2021.
- Born Digital: Used to introduce programs related to the 30th anniversary of the World Wide Web from March 2019. There are 5 idents that are on air until 2021.
- Saturday Night Drama: Used to introduce dramas on Saturday nights from 6 April 2019 to 16 October 2021.
- Bridge: Used since October 2021.
- Gallery: Used since October 2021.
- Speaker: Used from October 2021 to January 2023 although was used on 25 April 2023 to introduce a tribute to Harry Belafonte.
- Earth: Used since November 2021.

The black box logo was retained from the previous look but moved to the centre of the screen to divide the four segments. Promotional style also changed. The BBC Four logo would remain in the bottom corner of the screen throughout the promotion, but would be overlaid by the programme information in an opaque coloured box in the lower right segment of the screen, with the BBC Four logo in the centre. This was altered in 2008 to a BBC Four box appears in the middle of the screen from which the video is wiped out anticlockwise round the logo from the right revealing the programme information to the right of the logo. In July 2013, they updated trailer graphics. This includes centralizing the channel logo unifying trailer styles from BBC One and BBC Two. In February 2018, the channel updated its trailer graphics and holding animation shown during the channel's downtime hours. BBC Four is the first channel to use the new corporate font of the BBC, which is the BBC Reith.

The DOG for the channel remained the same in the 4:3 screen size safe zone; this was only changed in 2011 when it was switched to widescreen 16:9.

As of 2021, these idents have had the longest lifespan of any on a BBC channel.

The ident package was retained following the corporate rebrand of the BBC on 20 October 2021 with the 2021 BBC logo being placed at the top of the screen while "FOUR" was moved to the bottom, with the font changed to BBC Reith Sans. Bridge was the first ident to feature the updated branding at 7:00pm.

== See also ==
- History of BBC television idents
- BBC Four
- BBC Knowledge
