= BBC Two "Striped" ident =

1974 television station identification graphic used by BBC 2 (1974–1979)

Overview
- Channel: BBC 2
- In service: 28 December 1974 – 23 June 1979
- Design / Concept: Numeral 2 formed out of horizontal alternating blue and white stripes/discs
- Technique: Mechanical physical model (23 rotating discs)
- Preceded by: Cube 2 ident
- Followed by: Computer Generated 2 ident

The Striped 2 was an ident used by BBC 2 between c. 28 December 1974 and c. 23 June 1979. (Note: A recording of this ident in use on 21 June is known to exist; its replacement was in use by 23 June.) The ident featured a numeral 2 made out of horizontal lines.

== Launch ==
In 1974, the new look was to replace the previous look which had been going in one form or another for seven years. The tenth anniversary of BBC 2 was also that year, and so a new ident would have been greatly appreciated to celebrate the station. The new look would also coincide with the updated mirror globe look used by BBC 1 and a new look to both channels as a whole.

== Components of look ==
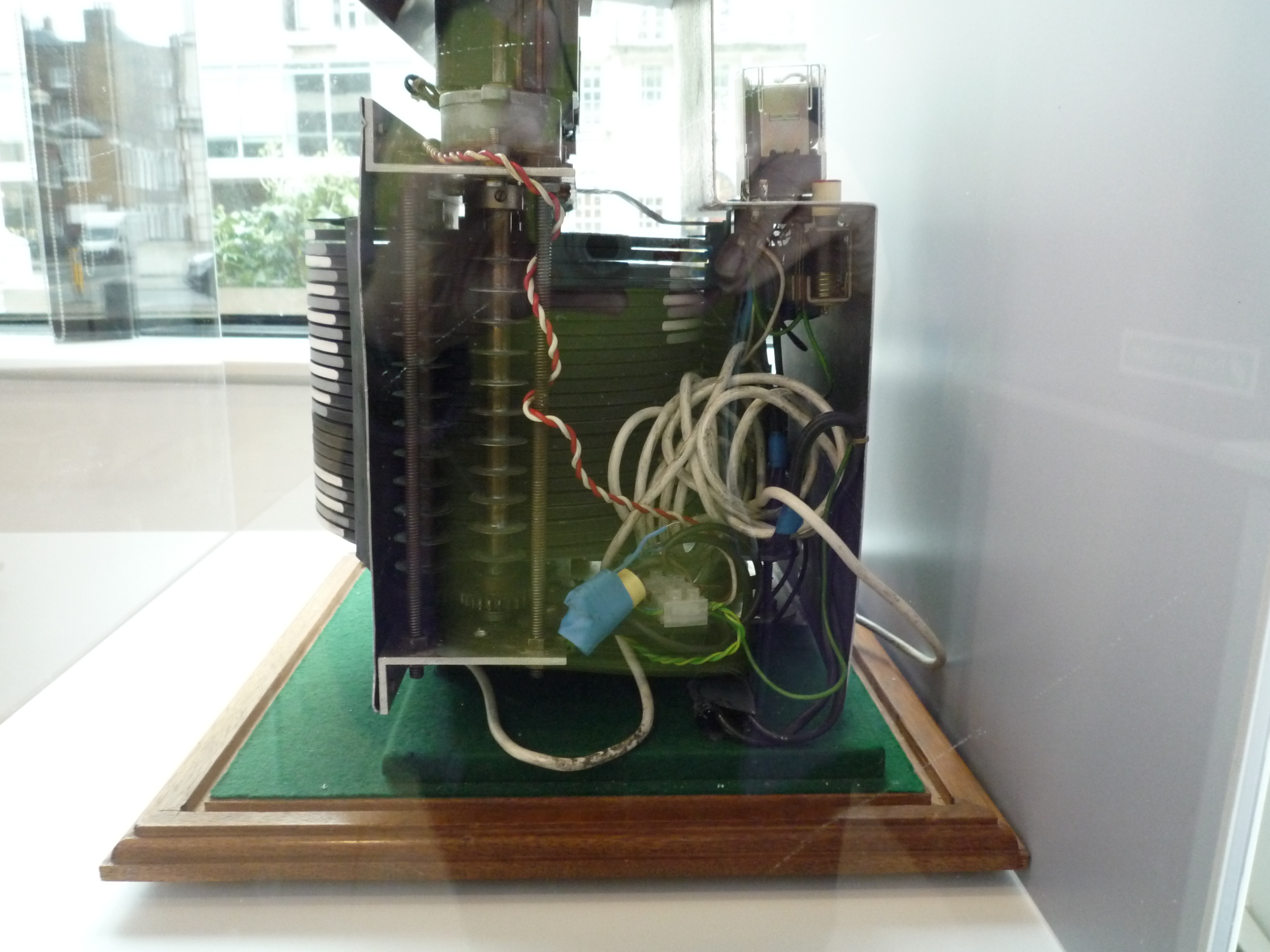
Side view

The ident itself featured a numeral 2 made out of discs of alternating colour of white and light blue. these discs used to revolve: the light blue all moving to off to the left of the screen, white to the right before both sets reform the 2, by coming in from the opposite side they left by. This ident was usually on a background of navy blue, but black was also occasionally used. The ident was commonly believed to be caused by two rotating cylinders, however they were in fact formed by 23 stacked discs, each with a different line drawn on the outside. Each disc rotated in a different direction to the disc immediately above and below it, and had colour added through the Noddy system that was used to make the BBC 1 mirror globes.

Initially, the accompanying clock was radically different to the one that came before it. This clock consisted of a dashed circle inside a square made up of thick white strokes, with gaps in the circle representing hour markings, and gaps in the square and connecting parallel strokes representing hours 3, 6, 9 and 12. The centre of the clock was ringed much like the 'polo mint' clock before and after it, but with a white dot in the middle. The corporate BBC 2 logo was situated in the lower left corner of the clock face, in cyan. (Note: A low-quality photograph published in the May 1978 issue of Television magazine is the only known surviving evidence of this clock.) This clock was dropped after just a couple of weeks, and the 'polo mint' clock that accompanied the previous look – still branded 'BBC 2 COLOUR' but now lacking the horizontal line – was brought back into use; the 'COLOUR' tag was removed by early March 1975, along with the second hand being made slightly shorter. (Note: BBC One's clock had its second hand adjusted a few months later.)

Promotional style was varied and usually did not feature the 2, however this was not always the case. In late 1975, a double-striped '2' started to appear on some captions, and it was this symbol that would form the basis of the next look. Unanimated, programme captions were used for programmes and featured the fully white striped '2' in the lower left corner with programme name beside it, all overlaid the picture.

== Special idents ==
Some special variations of the ident were used for specific programmes

- A version of the ident where the background was white, and the white lines were black, was used before a Shirley Bassey programme on 16 April 1976.
- A variant existed which featured the 2 revolving out, but a map of the British Isles (with solid lines representing the UK, and hollow lines representing Ireland) reforming in its place; the reverse form-up was also seen. The 2 logo in this variant is noticeably misaligned.

Some information about Christmas idents during this period exists.

- Christmas 1975 – The new double-striped '2', in its original 'square' shape, formed out of tinsel.
- Christmas 1976 – A sequinned layout version of the 2.
- Christmas 1977 – A red 2, with lines following the body of the 2, rotates above a "Christmas" caption.
- Christmas 1978 – Six medieval trumpeters, with the trumpet flags showing the new double-striped '2' logo.

== Notes ==
Preceded by Cube 2	BBC television idents 28 December 1974 – 23 June 1979	Succeeded by Computer Generated 2
