= BBC Two "Two" ident =

Television ident for BBC Two (1986–1991)

The TWO ident in a stencil style font

The TWO ident was the station identification used on BBC 2 between 30 March 1986 (Note: First airing was between 7.15 pm and 10 pm.) and 16 February 1991. It was the last non-corporate look for the channel, and the only look until 2018 that did not feature a numeral '2' in the design.

== Launch ==
Following their previous and groundbreaking striped 2 look, BBC Two wanted to go in a different programming direction. The ident they had commissioned had been around since 1979 and after nearly seven years' service, it was time for a replacement. The channel wanted to aim programming that was more highbrow and sophisticated. As a result, they wanted the new logo to reflect this. The BBC commissioned Alan Jeapes, who was responsible for the title sequence for BBC 1's hit soap EastEnders the year before, to create the new look. As with BBC One's COW ident the previous year, the ident debuted in the evening rather than at start-up. (Note: A recording exists of the 1979 ident in use at 5 pm, and a still exists of a cross-channel slide for the 10 pm showing of the Screen Two film Hard Travelling, showing the new "TWO" logo.)

== Components of the look ==
The ident for the look featured a white background with embossed, 3D lettering spelling out "TWO" in a stencil style font. The "TWO" logo was coloured red, green and blue to represent the phosphors of television, and was a device the channel had used before (they also represented the national colours of Wales, Northern Ireland and Scotland respectively). The upright part of the "T" was coloured red, the left hand diagonal of the "W" green and the middle diagonal blue. The "O" remained white, as did the remainder of the lettering. Similar to the last look, the lettering would either fade in from the background, fade out into the background, or remain on screen the whole time. There were no particular rules for which ident should be shown when, but the fade-in version was often used for the start of the day, and the fade-out version was notably used upon its final outing in the early hours of 16 February 1991. For subtitled programming, a small grey hard of hearing logo was located between the "T" and "W" of the "TWO", with the caption '888' situated below the logo.

A clock accompanied the look, as was common for the channel in these days. The clock, which beared a resemblance to the one used on Channel 4 at the time, had a white background, with embossed dashes at each position round the clock face. The "TWO" logo was placed below the clock, with the clock hands different colours: a red second hand, a green minute hand and a blue hour hand. The clock was electronically generated using the previous clock generator system and was often used before some news bulletins and before closedown. On this occasion, the clock would always fade to white, before fading to black. The new clock was not used by the nations, who simply used modified versions of the previous clock from 1980 with the new TWO logo in a solid colour. The colour scheme varied: in Wales the background was white and the TWO logo black, with grey hour markings and pale blue hands, and the centre dot in red; the white background was also used by Northern Ireland, but with the TWO logo in dark blue; and Scotland used a grey background with the TWO logo in white.

The promotional style used with the look varied throughout the time. Promotions themselves featured no unifying look and changed with seasons. The only key factor was that the "TWO" logo would appear in some form at the end, but this was not always guaranteed. At this time, programme slides were still being used frequently in continuity on both channels. At the beginning of this period, the technology was not yet in place for electronic captions, meaning that the original caption design needed to work on optical slides: it therefore needed to be a simple design. The original design involved a black strip across the bottom of the screen which included the "TWO" on the left and the programme title on the right. Following the acquisition of Quantel Paintbox however, the slides were now electronically generated allowing the "TWO" to appear not only 3D but on a white background. The new design featured the bottom half of the screen in white with 3D logo and name, with the white background fading upwards into the picture, in a similar design to the previous version. This was later modified to a single white gradiented strip, the width of the "TWO" logo on the left hand side with the programme name overlaid the picture, which now occupies the whole of the screen. For cross promotional captions, BBC 1 used a white caption, with the picture inside a box in the centre of the caption, with "TWO" logo and name located above the box. This style was not used on the main channel.

This look also marked the first time that the regions could opt out of the main BBC 2 schedule, following the move of some programming to the channel from BBC 1. To differentiate, regional versions of the "TWO" ident were made, with the region name in grey over a static caption of the TWO logo.

== Cancellation ==
In 1990, the newly recruited BBC 2 controller, Alan Yentob, noticed that the logo for the channel, the "TWO", was affecting the reputation of BBC 2. Surveys commissioned realised that most viewers thought the new look "dull" and "worthy". He then decided to commission a worthy successor capable of displaying the personality of the channel, revealing his thoughts in the How Do They Do That? episode about the idents. The successors were introduced on 16 February 1991. However, in 2010, for the 80's season, the "TWO" logo made an appearance. And on 7 October 2013, this, along with others was brought back for BBC Two's "Afternoon Classics" block.

== Special idents ==
BBC 2 used a number of special idents through its years, mainly for use at Christmas. Special idents were commissioned for this.

- Christmas 1986 – Snow constantly covers and uncovers the "TWO" in waves going left to right.
- Christmas 1987 – A transparent ball hangs in front of the camera as two people throw snowballs at each other with backgrounds of trees. The ball then pans up to reveal an all-white "TWO" logo, with a red dash above and a large green triangle stretching the entire length of the TWO above that.
- Christmas 1988 – A white-powdered person with green hair in the style of a Christmas tree cuts to a picture of a green and red "TWO" with the sections separated and frozen in ice.
- Christmas 1989 – Three figures seemingly made of wrapping paper move the sections of the "TWO" into position, which themselves seen to be made out of wrapping paper in the logo colours. The end board is accompanied by a synthesised nursery tune and rotating sheep in the background.
- Christmas 1990 – An upside-down triangle, square and circle burst open to reveal the letters TWO made out of items such as crackers, wheels and other assorted materials, accompanied by a soundtrack of two notes, the final note being dragged out for the length of the announcement. These idents were designed to follow on seamlessly from a similarly styled promotional trail.

A few other special idents were made:

- A "TWO" ident recoloured blue and red, with occasional powdered colours of blue and red, was used to mark a series of programmes on the French Revolution.
- A version with the letter spelling "THE" was used before the first episode of The Late Show.
- A spoof version of the logo, spelling "THREE", appeared in Roland Rat: The Series, shown on BBC 1.

== Notes ==
Preceded by Computer Generated 2	BBC television idents 30 March 1986 – 16 February 1991	Succeeded by 1991-2001 "2" idents (first run)
