= BBC Two "Curve" idents =

Package of television identifiers created by BBC Creative and Superunion

The first ident Feel Good features the curve "2" made of blobs, and is the first ident to use the boxless logo since 2001.

The BBC Two "Curve" idents have been broadcast since 27 September 2018 on BBC Two in the United Kingdom. The identity was developed by BBC Creative and branding agency Superunion, and consists of various animations based around a curve motif resembling a '2' in the centre. The "Curve" set pay homage to BBC Two's past use of its idents through the 1990s. The initial set of idents consists of sixteen sequences, created by various animators from around the world, including Aardman Animations, The Mill, Mainframe and Buck.

The ident package was retained following the corporate rebrand of the BBC on 20 October 2021, using the company's Chameleon branding design, with the 2021 BBC logo being placed at the top of the screen while "TWO" remains at the bottom, with the font changed to BBC Reith Sans. Illuminating was the first ident to feature the updated branding at 6:30am.

== Idents ==
=== Regular idents ===
Title	Air date	Description
Feel Good	27 September 2018 – present	A bunch of multicoloured blobs float around the screen, and then stick together forming the 2 curve and resembling sounds of squeaks, possibly inspired by the 1994 Pump sting from the 1991 set. This was the first ident of the new look to be used at 6:00am on 27 September 2018. This ident is mainly used to introduce a wide variety of programmes.
Captivating	27 September 2018 – present	Various paper ribbons move about on screen to form the 2 curve. Often used to introduce a wide variety of programmes.
Escapist	27 September 2018 – present	Rippling purple and orange fabric looking like canyon walls make 2 curve, possibly inspired by Silk from the 1991 set. Often used to introduce a wide variety of programmes.
Authoritative 1	27 September 2018 – present	Authoritative 1 is the most generic used of the set. Piles of paper wave around forming the 2 curve, possibly inspired by Paper Cut-Out from the 1991 set. Until 2021, stills of this ident were used for slides, such as breakdown slides and slides containing information for the BBC Action Line. Used to introduce serious programming and the BBC News.
Reflective	27 September 2018 – present	Sheets of paper turn over between the curve 2, possibly inspired by Diary from the 1991 set. This is the second generic ident of the set. Primarily used for serious programming and the BBC News.
Authoritative 2	27 September 2018 – present	Also known as Mind-Bending. White and grey lines overlapping and forming the 2 curve, possibly inspired by Optics from the 1991 set. The ding sound is the same as Authoritative 1. This is the third generic ident of the set. Used for serious programming and the BBC News.
Wonder	27 September 2018 – present	A green and blue crystalline mineral split in half by the 2 curve, possibly inspired by Water (or Water Reflection) from the 1991 set. Often used to introduce natural history programmes.
Celebratory	27 September 2018 – present	A multicoloured firework theme makes up the sides of the 2 curve, possibly inspired by Firecracker from the 1991 set. Often used for entertainment, sport and music programming.
Revelatory	27 September 2018 – present	A ribbon made of metal (resembling a slinky) moves about on screen to form the 2 curve, possibly inspired by the 1994 Slinky sting from the 1991 set. Often used to introduce a wide array of programmes, along with the BBC News.
Offbeat	27 September 2018 – present	An orange fluffy creature moves about the screen with its sticky purple feet and stops forming the 2 curve, possibly inspired by Dog from the 1991 set. Primarily used to introduce a wide array of programmes.
Thought-Provoking	28 September – 8 October 2018 (version 1); 25 November 2018 – present (version 2)	Also known as Initial. Black and white patterns dance around in the 2 curve, possibly inspired by the 1993 Op Art sting from the 1991 set. The initial version of Thought-Provoking appears to have been withdrawn along with Visceral in early October 2018. However, a revised version with the black background lightened and the white areas dimmed to an off-white/pale grey, was introduced on both BBC Two Network and Northern Ireland on 25 November that year. It is a rare ident, though it mainly appears before factual and quiz programmes.
Visceral	29 September – 4 October 2018; 30 January 2021 – present (version 1); 3 November 2018 – 29 January 2021 (version 2)	Brown, black and gold pins and scales open and close forming the 2 curve. Used to introduce drama programming and films. The initial version of Visceral appears to have been withdrawn along with Thought-Provoking in early October 2018. However, a revised version with reduced colour saturation was introduced at 2:40am on the evening of 3 November. Besides on 30 January 2021, the initial version has returned with the tagline "Channel of the Year" being added due to BBC Two winning Channel of the Year at the Edinburgh TV Awards in November 2020, then it became as a regular ident (without the tagline) on 30 October after the 2021 BBC rebrand.
Dark	30 September 2018 – present	Set entirely in shades of grey, the 2 curve animates like coral reef. Occasionally used, though it is mostly shown before drama and serious programming.
Gritty	6 October 2018 – present	Rising and falling blocks in the shape of the 2 curve. Often used for drama and factual programming. A silent version of this ident was used once on 21 September 2019.
Bold	10 October 2018 – present	A broken up black and gold stone effect (resembling a causeway) makes up the 2 curve, possibly inspired by the 2002 Giant's Causeway ident (which aired on BBC Two Northern Ireland) from the 2001 "Personality" set. Occasionally shown before drama and factual programmes.
Charged	13 October 2018 – 19 October 2021 (version 1); 4 November 2021 – present (version 2)	Clouds billowing around, and the 2 curve is formed by light shining through a crack in the clouds. Used for a variety of programmes, including drama and documentary programmes. The initial version of Charged appears to have been withdrawn in late October 2021, when the BBC corporate logo was revamped. However, a revised version with the black background behind the clouds was introduced at 9:00pm on the evening of 4 November.
Sharp Irreverent	21 October 2018 – present (promos); 27 October 2018 – present (ident)	Also known simply as Sharp. Several coloured threads ripping apart, with the 2 curve being seemingly cut into each one as they appear. Mostly used to introduce a variety of programmes, including quiz, entertainment and comedy.
Silly	3 November 2018 – present	Also known as Squish. Blobs of slime (with googly eyes) shaped like the 2 curve move around the screen, possibly inspired by the 2002 "Bugs" era of CBBC. Used for CBBC and CBeebies programmes shown on the channel on Saturdays (under the "Saturday Kids Zone" strand since 2022), as well as comedy, entertainment, and light factual programmes.
Gripping	8 November 2018 – present	Dark blue-coloured fabric is seen wringing itself into the shape of the 2 curve and back, possibly inspired by the 1997 Tug of War ident (which aired on BBC Two Wales) from the 1991 set. Rarely used for drama, factual, and serious programming.
Absorbing	28 November 2018 – present	Also known as Pleasurable Absorbing. Multicoloured liquid patterns slowly move across the screen, forming the 2 curve, possibly inspired by Paint from the 1991 set. Used to introduce a variety of programmes, including food-based and light factual programmes.
Sparky	22 April 2019 – present	A swarm of multicoloured plastic mini balls moving around the screen into the shape of the 2 curve in middle of white and back. Often used to introduce sports, entertainment and light factual programmes.
Discovery	28 May 2019 – present	A planet sized earth map in the middle of the 2 curve in blue spins around, and stops to reveal the pale red areas of the earth in the middle of the same curve in red, possibly inspired by the 1997 Mars Weekend ident from the 1991 set. Used to introduce documentary, factual, natural history and space-based programmes.
Intense	15 June 2019 – present	The camera zooming through colour rings, before they form up the 2 curve and resembling the sound of the crowd with a football being kicked about (or a tennis ball being squashed by the racket), resembling (and probably referencing) the 1988, 1996 and 1997 BBC Sport idents. The ding sound is the same as Celebratory. Used to introduce light entertainment, sports and quiz-based programmes.
Maverick	26 May 2019 – present (promos); 16 June 2019 – present (ident)	A small white ball moves around the screen, usually bouncing off pachinko-like pegs, with various objects and shapes popping up and disappearing to form the 2 curve. The ding sound is the same as Feel Good. First shown as promos on 26 May, airing as an ident on both the network, Northern Ireland and Wales from 16 June. Used to introduce comedy, drama and film programming.
Illuminating	20 June 2019 – present	A light scans around the 2 curve in a multicoloured background, with the shapes are changing while it scans, possibly inspired by both the 1995 Corridor sting from the 1991 set and Invisible Walls from the 2001 "Personality" set. The ding sound is the same as Charged. Used to introduce a variety of programmes.
Punchy	5 October 2019 – present	Consists of blue and red-orange glass stripes moving all around before they crashed together and forming the 2 curve, possibly inspired by all the 1974 Striped 2 ident, Neon and Zapper from the 1991 set, with the red-orange stripes reminiscent of the 1979 ident. Used to introduce a variety of programmes.
Thought-Provoking 2	23 November 2019 – present	Wooden blocks, fabric blocks, metallic shapes, walls, glass and stones moving around to form the 2 curve, possibly inspired by the 1995 Modern Art Gallery sting from the 1991 set. The ding sound is the same as Thought-Provoking. Rarely used to introduce documentary, factual and quiz programming.
Inspiring	10 April 2021 – present	A bunch of flower petals (resembling paper cones) swirl and spin around the screen and stops to form the 2 curve, possibly inspired by Garden from the 1991 set. The ding sound is the same as Wonder. Used to introduce a variety of programmes. First aired on 10 April 2021, with the tagline "Channel of the Year" being added due to BBC Two winning Channel of the Year at the Edinburgh TV Awards in November 2020. The tagline "Channel of the Year" disappeared on October 24, four days after the 2021 BBC rebrand. The version without the tagline "Channel of the Year" only aired on BBC Two Northern Ireland.

=== Special idents ===
Title	Air date	Description
Family	9 – 10 April 2021	A generic BBC ident, featuring a gold coloured BBC logo forming onto a blue background in silence, followed by the continuity announcer saying, "This is the BBC". This ident was first seen to introduce special programming across both BBC One and BBC Two following the death of Prince Philip, the Duke of Edinburgh, on 9 April. BBC Two's normal idents were restored at 06:20 the following morning.
Inside No. 9	10 May – 14 June 2021	Used to promote series six of Inside No. 9, which was filmed in 2020 under the Coronavirus protocols at the time. Same as the "Dark" and "Maverick" idents, except the show's logo is transparently shown.
Bold (BBC Three)	1 February 2022	Used to promote the relaunch of BBC Three and the premiere of RuPaul's Drag Race: UK vs. the World, but it was only shown before The Decade the Rich Won. Same as the "Bold" ident, but it's interrupted by Janey Jacké, who comes out to the television screen at the living room and tell the viewers to change the channel to BBC Three for showing the premiere of RuPaul's Drag Race: UK vs the World, then the ident plays normally. This also happened on BBC One and BBC Four.
HM Queen Elizabeth II	10 – 19 September 2022	Same as the "Family" ident, but with the coat of arms of Queen Elizabeth II and coloured purple. The text reads "HM Queen Elizabeth II - Remembered", in all caps. This ident was used to introduce special programmes following the death of Elizabeth II.
100 Years of Our BBC	18 October – 2 December 2022	These idents were used to introduce special programming across BBC One, BBC Two, BBC Four and BBC Scotland, following BBC's centennial celebrations. "Kids" was the final BBC 100 centenary ident used on BBC Two, at 7:30pm on 2 December 2022.

=== Christmas idents ===
Title	Air date	Description
Magical	2018: 1 – 31 December 2018; 2019: 1 – 31 December 2019; 2020: 30 November – 31 December 2020; 2021: 4 – 31 December 2021; 2022: 2 – 31 December 2022; 2023: 2 – 31 December 2023; 2024: 30 November – 31 December 2024; 2025: 30 November – 31 December 2025	A snow-covered fir tree with branches forming the 2 curve shakes off some of the snow, possibly inspired by the 1992 Christmas ident from the 1991 set.
Glamorous	2018: 1 – 31 December 2018; 2019: 1 – 31 December 2019; 2020: 30 November – 31 December 2020; 2021: 4 – 31 December 2021; 2022: 2 – 31 December 2022; 2023: 2 – 31 December 2023; 2024: 30 November – 31 December 2024; 2025: 30 November – 31 December 2025	Also known as Glorious. A brightly-coloured aurora shines in a dark, starry sky, weaving into the 2 curve shape at points. Occasionally seen outside of Christmas, such as promotion of Evolution in 2026.
Cosy	2018: 1 – 31 December 2018; 2019: 1 – 31 December 2019; 2020: 30 November – 31 December 2020; 2021: 4 – 31 December 2021; 2022: 2 – 31 December 2022; 2023: 2 – 31 December 2023; 2024: 30 November – 31 December 2024; 2025: 30 November – 31 December 2025	Also known as Comforting. A domestic cat flicks a bauble around on a carpeted floor - only its tail is seen, occasionally settling into the shape of the 2 curve, and purring sounds can be heard. First shown on BBC Two Network on 7 December 2018. Occasionally seen outside of Christmas, such as promotion of Big Cats 24/7 in 2024.
Festive	2019: 1 – 31 December 2019; 2020: 29 November – 31 December 2020; 2021: 4 – 31 December 2021; 2022: 2 – 31 December 2022; 2023: 2 – 31 December 2023; 2024: 30 November – 31 December 2024; 2025: 30 November – 31 December 2025	Various tinsel garlands are flying around the screen into the shape of the 2 curve in middle of purple tinsel and back.

== See also ==
- History of BBC television idents

Preceded by 1991–2001 2s (second run)	BBC television idents 27 September 2018 – present	Succeeded by Present
