= BBC One "Balloon" idents =

Set of idents used on BBC One (1997–2002)

Screenshot showing the balloon next to Eilean Donan Castle. (April 1999 Variant Picture)

The BBC One Balloon idents were a series of idents (station identifications) used on the British TV channel BBC One from 4 October 1997 to 28 March 2002. The balloon theme replaced the computer-generated spinning globe that had been used as the main ident on the channel since 1991, and marked a radical departure from the traditional spinning globe which had been the channel's primary identity since 1963. It launched on the same day as a BBC-wide rebrand, and thus the new idents also carried the new BBC logo. The channel's name also changed from BBC1 to BBC One. This was the last ident set used by the channel when it fully closed down; the last proper closedown took place in the evening hours of 8 November 1997. Starting the following evening, BBC News 24 (now the BBC News Channel) would broadcast on BBC One during closedown, which continues today.

The hot air balloon featured in the idents was filmed on location. The balloon was built by Cameron Balloons in 1997 and made its first flight that year, flying from the Bristol International Balloon Fiesta. It made its final flight in August 2002, also at the Bristol International Balloon Fiesta, and was subsequently retired and placed into storage. The balloon's flight certificate from the Civil Aviation Authority expired on 17 July 2003.

In March 2023, the balloon was taken out of storage, restored and reinflated. On 2 June, it was inflated for its first public flight at the Midlands Air Festival in Warwickshire by the Bristol Balloon Collectors, the balloon's new caretaker.

== Launch ==
As part of a large relaunch of the BBC's corporate logo and the ident packages of BBC One and BBC Two, these new idents replaced the old virtual globe ident. London-based design agency Lambie-Nairn proposed new idents showcasing the balloons with the familiar globe design that would serve as "a visual metaphor underpinning the core thought: BBC One – bringing the whole world to every corner of the Nation."

The balloon idents were designed by Lambie-Nairn and the balloon was made in Bristol by Cameron Balloons. Its aircraft registration was "G-IBBC".

== Components of idents ==
The idents featured a predominantly red balloon emblasoned with an orange world map and white clouds floating over various scenes of the British landscape. These colours were chosen because a balloon mimicking a traditional map's blue oceans and green land would have been more difficult to see against the natural scenery. The size of the balloon was originally proposed to be 100 ft. but was reduced to 60 ft. upon construction.

The idents featured a soundtrack of ambient music, with livelier versions being used for more industrial or recreational settings. The soundtrack was composed by English musician Phil Sawyer. This score made these idents the first regular BBC One idents to use music since Abram Games's "Bat's Wings" ident. The new BBC logo, along with the channel name "ONE" immediately to its right, was overlaid at the bottom of the screen. The new logo design was an attempt to unify all the BBC's services and brands under a single logo design, with the idents expressing the BBC's desire to "[reach] out to all corners of the land." From October 1998, the idents were shown on widescreen. The '888' tag was also phased out on 1 July 1999, to be replaced with "Subtitles" following the uptake in digital television and the increased use of the new BBC Text service and the bbc.co.uk URL was added above the logo soon after.

The new look also featured a clock, which used the same software and layout as before, and utilized the balloon canvas as the background. The clock was also retained following the change to widescreen. However, the software was changed so that the minute hand only moved once a minute, rather than every second as it had previously.

Promotions and static captions both featured text and logos centred for widescreen use, with the BBC One logo at the bottom of the screen and a colour palette of mainly oranges and reds. However, colours varied according to the theme and programme. The use of static captions was reduced slightly but remained a key part of continuity links.

=== Original locations ===
The original sequences were filmed over four months in 1997 at different locations around the United Kingdom. From these locations, forty-seven different 35-second films were produced featuring the balloon floating serenely over British landscapes. Much of the photography was from a helicopter at heights of up to 3,500 ft. One noticeable and intentional aspect about the original balloon films was that none of the sequences featured people or any distinct human activity. The locations were:

- Eilean Donan Castle, Scottish Highlands
- Forth Rail Bridge, Scotland
- London Docklands and One Canada Square
- River Thames
- Strangford Lough, Northern Ireland
- Grey Abbey, Northern Ireland
- Snowdonia National Park, Wales
- Cardiff City Hall, South Wales
- South Downs, Seaford, East Sussex
- Port of Felixstowe, Suffolk
- Swinside Stone Circle, Cumbria

=== Later additions ===
A year after its launch in autumn 1998, several more idents were created and added to the collection. The main difference between these new additions and the originals was that people were now included in some of the sequences, and the balloon in some idents was computer-generated. However, the balloon itself did fly over the following locations:

- Cley next the Sea, Norfolk
- Cerne Abbas Giant, Dorset *
- St Michael's Mount, Cornwall
- Blackpool Tower
- The Needles, Isle of Wight
- Brecon Beacons, South Wales *
- Dunluce Castle, Northern Ireland
- Giant's Causeway, Northern Ireland *
- Ballachulish, Scotland *
- Edinburgh, Scotland *

Places marked with * were used in short "stings" between programs.

In 1999, three of the locations were incorporated, which were:

- Angel of the North
- Second Severn Crossing, Wales
- Scottish Exhibition and Conference Centre, Glasgow, Scotland

By March 2000, the BBC wanted the balloon idents to become more inclusive, so they introduced "lifestyle" idents. These featured skateboarders, a busy market scene (filmed at Kingston upon Thames) and a carnival (filmed at Notting Hill), all of which featured the balloon digitally flying past in the background. A bungee jumper was also filmed jumping out of the balloon.

=== Special idents ===
There were also many special idents made for new programs, sporting events and, most notably, the Christmas holiday. These included:

==== Christmas ====
Title	Airdate	Description
12 Days of Christmas	24 December 1997	A series of idents depicting verses of The 12 Days of Christmas, such as a "maid a-milking", some lords "leaping" by bouncing on space hoppers, an acrobat twirling two gold rings, and a "partridge in a pear tree". Other verses (e.g. "two turtle doves") were also depicted in stings and promotional trailers. The balloon did not appear in the set.
Bauble	24 December 1998	A giant red bauble swings from side to side against a snowy white background. Some variations also include penguins and reindeer. As with the previous year, the balloon did not appear in the set.
Father Christmas	24 December 1999	The balloon flies in the night sky alongside a holographic Father Christmas ringing a bell.
Christmas Balloon	22 December 2000	Father Christmas pilots the balloon, delivering presents by dropping them via parachutes.
Christmas Toys	21 December 2001	Three toys float around on balloons in a cosy room while the balloon flies outside. Produced by Aardman Animations, the three toys used were all connected to BBC One's Christmas Day schedule in 2001. The ident included a dog (the terrestrial premiere of Toy Story), a dinosaur (the dramatic epic The Lost World), and a Reliant Robin van (the comeback of Only Fools and Horses after it had last aired in 1996).

==== Other ====
Title	Airdate	Description
Ben Elton	16 April – 4 June 1998	A series of eight parody idents promoting Ben Elton's television series in 1998. The series included the balloon being deflated by a channel-hopping 2-shaped blade (from BBC Two's Blade ident), and the balloon being chased by a "police" balloon.
1999 Eclipse	August 1999	Near Pentre Ifan in Pembrokeshire, Wales, the balloon flies in front of the sun, eclipsing it.
Walking with Dinosaurs	2 October 1999 - 2 September 2000	The balloon flies over a Polacanthus wandering across a desert wasteland. This was to promote the debut of Walking with Dinosaurs.
Millennium Dome	31 December 1999 - 9 September 2000	The balloon flies over the Millennium Dome at night, lighting up in time to the music. It was used to introduce coverage of the new Millennium celebrations.
Euro 2000	8 June – 18 October 2000	The balloon flies over a football stadium, where a goalkeeper lets a goal pass his net. The first announcement was an apology about a power outage on 20 June 2000.
Sydney Olympics 2000	25 August 2000	The balloon flies over the Sydney Opera House while an athlete shines a flaming torch he runs to the top at the Sydney Opera House in its direction.
Blue Planet	8 September 2001	The balloon is seen from underwater from a shark-infested sea in order to promote the debut of The Blue Planet.
Walking with Beasts	8 November 2001	The balloon flies over a herd of woolly mammoths migrating in the Ice Age. This was to promote the show Walking with Beasts.

== Replacement of the ident ==
On 1 November 2000, Lorraine Heggessey became controller of BBC One and immediately ordered a review of the channel's branding. In her opinion, the balloon was "slow and distant". On 29 March (Good Friday) 2002, after much speculation, the balloon idents were replaced as the icon of BBC One with a set of idents with the theme of Rhythm & Movement, making it the final motif of the globe logo for the channel after 39 years. English 12 was the final ident aired before BBC News 24 at 2.15 am in the late evening hours of 28 March 2002 on the England version of BBC One. Northern Ireland had a 35-second tribute of the idents before signing off.

The balloon itself last took to the skies in the summer of 2002 when it took part in the Bristol International Balloon Fiesta. It was in the care of the Sussex-based Balloon Preservation Group, before being moved around different storage locations in the UK.

== Later uses of the balloon ==
In early 2023, plans were announced for the balloon to be flown for the first time in over two decades. It was inflated to test its condition in March 2023. In June 2023, it was flown at the Midlands Air Festival in Warwickshire. The current owners, Bristol Balloon Collectors expressed interest in flying the balloon more throughout summer 2023.

== Reception ==
The idents were well received by viewers and have a loyal fan base to this day. The original pilot, Mark Lockwood, told the BBC in 2023 that the balloon was "iconic in its way."

== BBC America ==
The balloon idents were also shown on BBC America between 1998 and 2001. Unlike BBC One, BBC America employed shorter, snappier cuts of various balloon sequences with large changes to the familiar musical score.

== See also ==
- History of BBC television idents

Preceded by "Virtual Globe" ident	BBC television idents 4 October 1997 – 28 March 2002	Succeeded by "Rhythm & Movement" idents
