= BBC One "Virtual Globe" ident =

Television ident for BBC One (1991–1997)

The Virtual Globe ident

The Virtual Globe was the method of creating the BBC 1 symbol that was used between 16 February 1991 and 4 October 1997.

== Launch ==
The Virtual Globe replaced the COW on 16 February 1991 and was designed by Martin Lambie-Nairn, owner of the Lambie-Nairn design agency, and Daniel Barber. The first aspects of the look were first witnessed at 6.40 am, when the updated Open University symbol first aired, showing the stylised '1'. This was followed at 7 am by the new clock that accompanied the look, introducing a BBC Breakfast News summary. The first time the ident itself aired was at 9.10 am, when it introduced Going Live!, (Note: Delayed from its listed time of 9 am due to an unscheduled news summary.) the Saturday morning magazine show on Children's BBC, where the ident itself was "unveiled" by presenters Phillip Schofield and Sarah Greene. (Note: The mock unveiling occurred after the ident's first on-screen appearance.)

== Components of look ==
=== Regular idents ===
The ident consisted of a figure "1" inside a rotating transparent globe surrounded by a swirling smoky atmosphere above the BBC's corporate logo (which had gradually been introduced on-screen since late 1987): the bold italic letters B B C within three rhomboids, above blue red and green flashes. (Note: The logo as it appeared on the ident was all-white.) The idents were created by filming a physical globe, but used CGI effects to give it its smoky look. The ident had no soundtrack and was played off a Sony LaserDisc implementation, Sony CRVdisc. Upon first impressions, the ident does not appear like a globe, as the smoky CGI effects hide and disfigure the continents. However, land masses can be seen in the globe and their shadows can be seen on the background of the ident.

A clock accompanied the look, which used GNAT (Generator of Network Analogue Time), resulting in the clock mimicking the movement of an analogue clock by moving the minute hand every second, rather than every 15 seconds as was found on previous station clocks. The counters on the clocks alternated between dots and dashes pointing towards the centre, a smoky static background and included the BBC logo at the bottom of the screen, although no on-screen reference to the channel being BBC 1. The clock was originally large to fit the screen best, however the size contrast between the clock and the globe resulted in difficulty at closedown, as the two do not fade easily. This issue was resolved in December 1991, when the clock was shrunk down to the same as the globe, easing fading between. The background was also altered to a ripple effect, yet retaining the smoky feel. (Note: BBC Two changed the size of its clock at around the same time to match that on BBC One, although in BBC Two's case the clock was simply zoomed out and otherwise remained largely identical.)

The look also featured an updated style of captions and promotions. Promotions featured the '1' above a BBC logo in the top left of the screen, with the end screen of promotions featuring the programme name at the bottom of the screen. Captions were similar, being formed of a sidebar with the '1' and BBC logo in top left corner with the background of the sidebar featuring a smoky background similar to the ident.

=== Christmas idents ===
Title	Air dates	Description
Virtual Moon	Christmas 1991	Similar to the normal ident but the figure '1' is inside a rotating, icy coloured moon, with Father Christmas in his sleigh flying around it. When it introduced the film Batman, the bat symbol was superimposed on top. It was accompanied by a simple four note fanfare.
Toy	Christmas 1992	A shining figure '1' is at the bottom of a Christmas tree surrounded by various bouncing and moving toys. A photograph of HM The Queen was used at closedown because the BBC deemed the ident "too jolly" to be used against the National Anthem.
North Pole	Christmas 1993	An icy figure '1' is in a snowy landscape, with two polar bears and Father Christmas in his sleigh flying above it, which the bears watch. There are two versions, one in day-time and one in night-time.
Christmas Present	Christmas 1994	The figure '1' is a Christmas present with a snowman either side of tipping their hats. This ident was unusual in that it had three different variations. In the run up to and on Christmas Eve it was neatly wrapped, on Christmas Day it was unwrapped by the snowmen to reveal a shining gold numeral and on Boxing Day and onwards the wrapping remains had been removed to display the gold numeral '1'. The Christmas Day version was occasionally used on and after Boxing Day. Normal idents were used for closedown.
Star	Christmas 1995	The figure '1' is on top of a Christmas tree in place of a star, with starry glitter surrounding it and a toy plane flying around it. In addition, a variation was made without the plane, which was used at closedown.
Gift Box	Christmas 1996	A circular box is opened by two toys to reveal a gold figure '1' inside. A version without the toy figures was used for Closedown and introduction into serious programming, should the need arise.

== Replacement ==
The ident set was replaced following a detailed look at the corporate identity. Lambie-Nairn, who carried out the investigation, found that the current slanted logo did not work on screen well, and therefore suggested replacing it with a new logo featuring straightened boxes. The development of this new logo made the old one, still in use on the idents, obsolete. Also, as part of this rethink, Lambie-Nairn recommended using the BBC logo, with the service name after, instead of unique logos and numerals for each service, as this weakened the core brand. As a result, he suggested that the identity be changed, with personality added through the ident subject rather than a logo. He therefore developed the idea of a hot-air balloon as the new idents. They went into service on 4 October 1997.

== See also ==
- History of BBC television idents

== Notes ==
Preceded by Computer Originated World	BBC television idents 16 February 1991 – 4 October 1997	Succeeded by Balloon idents
