= BBC Two "Computer Generated 2" ident =

Television ident for BBC Two (1979–1986)

The electronic 2 ident February 1981 Variant Picture

The Computer Generated 2 was an ident used by BBC 2 between c. 16 June 1979 (Note: A recording exists of this ident in use on 23 June; its predecessor is known to have been used as late as 21 June.) and 30 March 1986. (Note: Last seen in the evening rather than the early hours.) It was the first computer generated television station identification in the world.

== Launch ==
The ident package was launched in June 1979. The ident was aired through a solid-state computer device, not unlike the one used later for BBC 1's Computer Originated World, built by BBC engineers, and designed by Oliver Elmes. The concept of the double striped '2' had been around for a long time: following the two television channels dropping corporate branding, a similar look was adopted by both channels featuring double striped numbers and BBC letters. The double-striped '2' first appeared in late 1975 and was even used for that year's Christmas ident, (Note: A low-quality photograph published in the January 1990 issue of Television magazine is the only known surviving evidence of this ident.) although it was initially squarer in shape, gradually evolving into its final rounded form in mid-1978. (Note: The earliest known appearance of the final version of the twin-striped '2' is in a May 1978 promo for the Chelsea Flower Show, predating the electronic ident by more than a year.) It had been in use on programme promotions since around 1977, on holding slides since late 1978, and on News on 2 since early 1979.

== Components of the look ==
The ident itself featured a cream, double striped numeral 2, with two orange lines either side going off screen. The whole ident had the illusion of three dimensions, with orange shadows, all on a black background. The ident would either remain static, scroll in from the left hand side or scroll out to the right. The form up ident was accompanied by an electronic fanfare, which was dropped in 1983. A subtitled programme would be accompanied by the additional caption below the numeral stating 'Ceefax 270' and later following a change of page 'Ceefax 888'.

The clock which accompanied this new look was located in the BBC 2 Noddy room and comprised an orange clock face with counters of ever increasing thickness and with a 'polo' mint centre upon a black background. A plain orange and white 2D striped '2' logo was placed below the clock. The use of this old clock was due to the fact that the technology did not exist for an electronic timepiece, and would not until 1980, when an electronic timepiece was finally obtained for BBC 2. This new electronic clock had no second hand judder and had a changed design, featuring two dashes at the quarter hours and single dashes elsewhere. The polo mint centre was abandoned in favour of a simple centre dot, and the 3D striped '2' logo adorned the bottom of the screen, although it was unanimated. The electronic clock made its on-screen debut on 6 September 1980, although the old mechanical clock would still make the occasional appearance thereafter.

Promotional style wasn't uniform, but generally featured the striped '2' in the promotion in one form or another, whether at the beginning or appearing on the end slide. Programme slides featured a large white 2 with programme title overlaid the bottom of the image. This branding preceded the inception of the new ident by several months, with slides featuring the striped '2' from as early as late 1978. The BBC 2 special Christmas ident of 1978, featuring rotating buglers, also incorporated this version of the striped '2'. This '2' differed slightly from the one seen on idents from 1979, where the numeral had right angles, instead of the curves that appeared in the later version.

Regional variations of BBC 2 featured the region name below the 2.

A variation of the look was introduced on 19 September 1983 and was used during the Daytime on 2 strand. It featured the ident with an orange gradient background.

== Special idents ==
Some special versions were produced for public celebrations such as Christmas:

- Christmas 1979 – A revolving perspex snowflake rotates over a white version of the logo at the bottom of the screen.
- Christmas 1980 – Similar to the previous year, a more colourful perspex snowflake rotating above a Christmas BBC2 caption
- Christmas 1981 – Three red translucent candles spinning around with the caption Christmas 2
- Christmas 1982 – Three green perspex Christmas trees with a hand-drawn, angular BBC2 caption.
- Christmas 1983 – Another similar theme to the previous year. Three metallic Christmas trees spinning against the Christmas 2 caption.
- Christmas 1984 – A pink bauble with the '2' on it remains stationary while a stylised ribbon spelling 'Christmas' rotating around it.
- Christmas 1985 – A blue tinted Christmas scene rotates around the '2'.

== Special uses ==
The ident was reused in early 2005 for the opening continuity announcement in the second series of the period comedy Look Around You.

It was reused again in May 2010, with a new soundtrack, as part of BBC Two's "80's Season", to celebrate events and features from the decade.

It was then brought back twice in October 2012, with no soundtrack. It was shown in Northern Ireland on the 10th of October 2012 to mark the shutdown of analogue transmissions in the area and shown nationally during the final evening hours of 21 October at 4:35am to lead into the final edition of Pages From Ceefax after 38 years on-screen across the BBC.

On 7 October 2013, this (and its Christmas '79, '84 & '85 ident in England and Northern Ireland), along with others was brought back for BBC Two's "Afternoon Classics" block and last appeared in December 2016.

It made its final appearance in 2017 to introduce the 80s-set comedy White Gold.

== Notes ==
Preceded by Striped 2	BBC television idents 23 June 1979 – 30 March 1986	Succeeded by TWO
