= Coat of arms of the BBC =

- Armiger: BBC
- Adopted: 1927
- Crest: On a Wreath of the Colours, a Lion passant Or, grasping in the dexter fore-paw a Thunderbolt proper.
- Torse: A Wreath of the Colours
- Shield: Azure a Terrestrial Globe proper encircled by an Annulet Or, and seven Estoiles in Orle Argent.
- Supporters: On either side an Eagle, wings addorsed proper collared Azure pendant therefrom a Bugle horn stringed Or.
- Motto: Nation shall speak peace unto Nation
- Other elements: Badge – A Thunderbolt proper thereon a Pellet inscribed with the letters BBC Or.

The coat of arms of the BBC was adopted in March 1927 to represent the purpose and values of the corporation. It is rarely used nowadays except for ceremonial purposes.

== Elements ==
The various elements of the coat of arms were chosen to provide a heraldic translation of the qualities of the BBC.

- Lion — the crest of the coat of arms has a lion above the helmet. The lion is the national animal of the UK and indicates the BBC's British identity.
- Thunderbolt — The lion grasps a thunderbolt in its outstretched paw, this to represent broadcasting itself (transmission).
- Eagles — In heraldic language the two eagles which grasp the shield are "supporters". Eagles were chosen to depict the inherent speed of broadcasting. Both eagles have bugles suspended from their collars, representing "proclamation", i.e. the public service element of broadcasting.
- Motto — The coat of arms features the BBC motto, "Nation shall speak peace unto Nation"
- Shield
  - Globe — the globe in the shield of the coat of arms represents the scope and breadth of the BBC's operations
  - Estoiles — Around the globe are seven estoiles, heraldic symbols for divine goodness and nobility. Their place in the shield increase the representation of the scope and breadth of the corporation. They also symbolise the seven planets in the Solar System other than the Earth. (The arms were granted prior to the discovery of Pluto in 1930, which was classified as a planet from that time until 2006.)

The background of the shield, the mantling (drapery depicted tied to the helmet above the shield) and the collars of the eagles are blue (azure in heraldry).

The style of the coat of arms has changed considerably over time; from the style of the motto, the formality of the lion and eagles, the alignment of the shield (it was tilted in early versions, and is now perfectly straight) and the addition of a compartment (the design placed under the shield, a grassy mound in the BBC coat of arms).

== Motto ==
The idealistic BBC motto is most likely based on biblical verses from the Book of Micah and the Book of Isaiah: "Nation shall not lift up sword against nation, neither shall they learn war anymore". In 1934, the motto was changed to "Quaecunque", meaning "Whatsoever". This was inspired by St Paul's Epistle to the Philippians 4:8:

DE CETERO FRATRES QUAECUMQUE SUNT VERA QUAECUMQUE PUDICA QUAECUMQUE IUSTA QUAECUMQUE SANCTA QUAECUMQUE AMABILIA QUAECUMQUE BONAE FAMAE SI QUA VIRTUS SI QUA LAUS HAEC COGITATE

English (King James Bible):

Finally, brethren, whatsoever things are true, whatsoever things are honest, whatsoever things are just, whatsoever things are pure, whatsoever things are lovely, whatsoever things are of good report; if there be any virtue, and if there be any praise, think on these things.

This inspired the dedication that appears in the entrance hall of Broadcasting House:

DEO OMNIPOTENTI TEMPLUM HOC ARTIUM ET MUSARUM ANNO DOMINI MCMXXXI RECTORE JOHANNI REITH PRIMI DEDICANT GUBERNATORES PRECANTES UT MESSEM BONAM BONA PROFERAT SEMENTIS UT IMMUNDA OMNIA ET INIMICA PACI EXPELLANTUR UT QUAECUNQUE PULCHRA SUNT ET SINCERA QUACUNQUE BONAE FAMAE AD HAEC AVREM INCLINANS POPULUS VIRTUTIS ET SAPIENTIAE SEMITAM INSISTAT

English:

This Temple of the Arts and Muses is dedicated to Almighty God by the first Governors of Broadcasting in the year 1931, Sir John Reith being Director-General. It is their prayer that good seed sown may bring forth a good harvest, that all things hostile to peace or purity may be banished from this house, and that the people, inclining their ear to whatsoever things are beautiful and honest and of good report, may tread the path of wisdom and uprightness.

In 1948, the motto reverted to the original.

== Usage ==
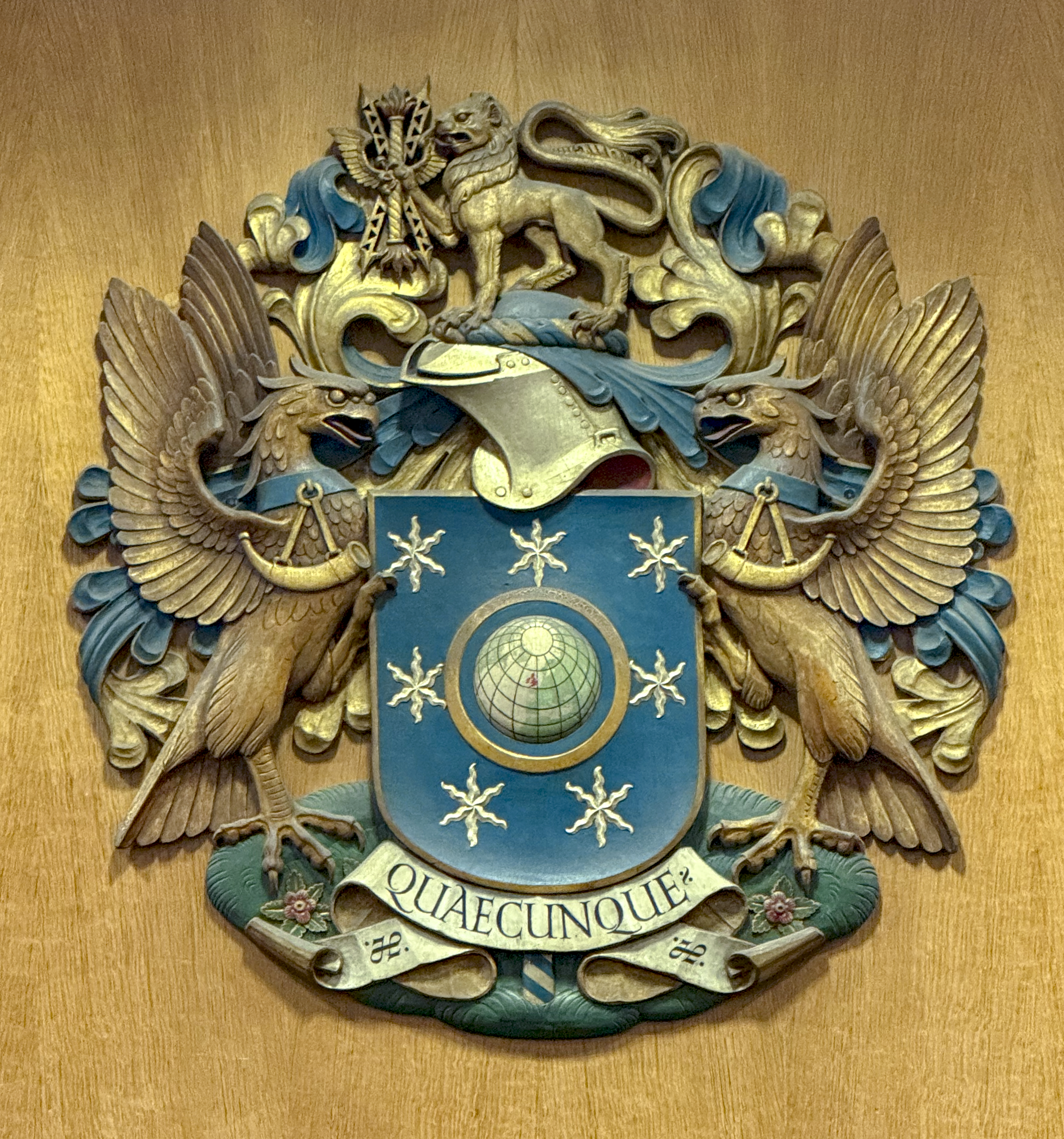
Coat of arms of the BBC inside Broadcasting House

Prior to 1986, the logo was used on a few sources, mainly BBC documentation and stationery, or for some uses around studios. In these instances, the coat of arms would not be used directly, but used subtly on other furniture, such as the bollards outside New Broadcasting House, Manchester.

Following the redesign in 1986, the coat of arms was used more frequently alongside the main logo. Some examples include:

- In the BBC's "virtual" news set, used between 13 April 1993 and 9 May 1999, much of what was seen was computer generated using Silicon Graphics systems. The titles opened to the BBC News logo overlaid on the spinning globe. The shot widened to include the whole coat of arms and finally the whole set, of which only the newsreaders and parts of the desk were real. The coat of arms, studio lights, floor and the majority of the desk were all computer generated.
- The generic BBC News titles prior to 1993 used a transmitter as its icon, similar to that used on the coat of arms.
- The coat of arms featured on flags from BBC studios, and on signage for the studios themselves.
- The BBC outtakes programme Auntie's Bloomers featured a set of large shelves with tape records, dusty corners and industrial lift shafts, meant to represent the BBC Archives. The centre of this set is Terry Wogan's desk where he provides his commentary. The floor in this central section features a large version of the coat of arms.
- The coat of arms featured in publications, including back covers and on the spines of books.

The coat of arms has since largely been superseded by the BBC blocks logo from 1997. It has not been abandoned by the corporation, but no longer appears on programmes or prominently in BBC publications, buildings or other locations.

== Badge ==
The BBC was also granted a heraldic badge of: A Thunderbolt proper thereon a Pellet inscribed with the letters BBC Or.

== See also ==
- Logo of the BBC
