= Computer Originated World =

Television ident for BBC One (1985–1991)

The Computer Originated World as seen on BBC 1

The uncoloured frames were only sufficient for a 180-degree rotation of the globe; at this point the colours applied for front and back were switched and mirrored to create the remaining 180 degrees

The Computer Originated World (COW) was the BBC 1 symbol of a globe that was used between 18 February 1985 and 16 February 1991. It was later used by the international, commercial television service BBC World Service Television from its launch until 26 January 1995.

== BBC 1 ==
=== Launch ===
The Computer Originated World replaced the previous Noddy globe symbols at 7 pm on 18 February 1985. Unusually, the new look was unveiled whilst the channel was still on the air rather than waiting for the following morning to launch it. The globe was created by the BBC graphics and BBC computer departments and work began in 1983. The need to replace the Noddy globes came about as the globes were the only mechanically produced idents around on national television, as more and more television companies started to use computer graphics, made popular by the launch of Channel 4. The COW was originally planned to launch on 1 January 1985, but Michael Grade, then controller of BBC 1, delayed the launch to coincide with a larger schedule change that accompanied the launch of the soap opera EastEnders and chat show Wogan. This launch was hoped to reinvent BBC 1 following ratings slide and ever increasing competition from their commercial rivals at ITV.

The globe itself launched at 7 pm on 18 February, introducing one of the new flagship programmes: Wogan, a chat show hosted by Terry Wogan and featuring a variety of guests. The old Noddy globe had been used throughout the day until the 7 pm launch. The globe was used onscreen by BBC Video on releases between June 1988 and November 1991.

=== Components of look ===
The Computer Originated World itself is a semi-transparent blue globe with golden continents and gold "BBC 1" legend located below the globe in a font similar to that used in the early days of the BBC. The globe revolved at a steady pace throughout, and had the effect of a spotlight added to the surface. The continents were placed in such a way that the continents appeared to float on the water. The caption had the option of displaying the legend 'Ceefax 170' and later 'Ceefax 888' in reference to the subtitles available with the programme. Regional variations also included a legend with the region name, also in gold, below the BBC 1 legend. The globe was generated when needed by the computer programme located in a metal box. This box had switches on the front that could turn the BBC 1 caption, regional caption and subtitles caption on and off, as these elements were added later. These generators were delivered to all 11 regions and installed before Christmas 1984. Originally it was planned to be launched on 1 January 1985, but the launch was deferred to coincide with radical changes to the BBC 1 schedule.

The look also featured an altered clock face to that used previously. This clock was once again electronic, but was changed to a black background, blue counters and gold hands to match the ident. The updated BBC 1 legend also featured below the clock. The nations of Scotland, Wales and Northern Ireland, as well as BBC Midlands, did receive their own variations of the clock, however it is not believed that any other English regions received their own variations. The network BBC One clock did not have a centre dot; this was never rectified throughout the run of the clock due to an oversight, however the dot was present on regional variations.

The new look also marked a change in programme slide design. These new slides featured the BBC 1 legend upright and sideways in a black sidebar to the left of the screen. The remainder of the screen featured a picture of the programme and the programme name located at the bottom. However, the programme slides were still optically developed. This was changed in September 1988 when the introduction of Quantel Paintbox allowed captions to be created digitally. The design was altered slightly with the BBC 1 legend made more textured, slightly smaller and moved to the bottom of the screen. The font was also changed to Optima, with text remaining in the same position. All this would now be located over the image rather than separate from it.

Promotions were not uniform, but were based on a seasonal scheme before being replaced. The promotions usually did not contain any channel branding but would occasionally feature parts of the BBC 1 legend in the design.

=== Christmas idents ===
During Christmas times, the '1' and the globe was altered into a variety of guises. One was made for each year the ident was in existence, None were used by BBC Scotland, instead using their own idents.

Title	Air dates	Description
Red Robin	Christmas 1985	This ident had the new "BBC 1" logo in a snowy landscape with a robin sitting on it fluttering its wings, with another robin rotating around the logo. Three versions were made: one for day-time, one for dusk, and one for night-time. This was the last mechanical ident produced for the channel. The machinery for the ident was reportedly unreliable and would accelerate to dangerous speeds upon being run for more than a minute, thus the normal COW ident was used instead at nightly closedowns. The ident was accompanied by hand animated promotional trails featuring the robins. The robins were famously detonated by The Late, Late Breakfast Show host Noel Edmonds at the start of an episode of the show on 4 January 1986.
Cartoon 1	Christmas 1986	A cartoon smiling Christmas tree in a forest, with the "BBC 1" logo in front of it, and holly dancing around it. The ident was designed by a viewer following a Children's BBC competition. The ident was made with cel animation and therefore the camera would shake while small dots appeared on-screen for a milisecond, similar to 35mm film.
Cartoon 2	Christmas 1987	A cartoon graphic reading BBC Christmas 1 made up of various Christmas motifs such as various presents, a candle, holly and ribbons. The short animation was designed to tie into the end of promotions. Promotional style featured a panning view into a child's nursery, before a bag falls, pouring out streamers and ribbons. This streamer animation would be played at the end of the promotion to link into the ident. It was designed by Bernard Newnham, and was the first computer-generated Christmas ident used by the channel.
A Partridge in a Pear Tree	Christmas 1988	A partridge flies onto a pear tree and sits on a branch, with the "BBC 1" logo superimposed on top. Two versions were made one for day-time and one for night-time. At closedown, the partridge would fly close to the screen, and with a swoop, close the channel's broadcasting until the morning.
Spinning Top	Christmas 1989	The globe is a spinning top, spinning at the bottom of a Christmas tree with a ribbon around with the "BBC 1" logo on it. Again linked in with end promotions, which would link in by means of a toy train passing in front of the screen. This ident was not unveiled until the evening of Christmas Eve – the normal COW ident had been used for most of the day.
Pop-up Book	Christmas 1990	The globe appears superimposed on a face on the cover of a pop-up book about magic. The introduction sequence and promotions all featured the book opening and a wizard dancing round casting magic upon a variety of objects, often with a time feel, such as a large clock face and hour glass. This was the last Christmas ident not to have corporate branding.

=== Regional idents ===
Title	Air dates	Description
Gift Box	Christmas 1985 (Scotland)	This ident was like the regular COW globe ident, but the COW was replaced with a revolving blue gift box, with the continents in gold with gold wrapping paper and ribbons around it.
Stars	Christmas 1986 (Scotland)	Simply the regular COW globe ident, with stars covering the black background, making it like a night sky.
Church	Christmas 1986 (Wales)	The COW globe was replaced with a snowy church. A wreath in a circle shows where the COW would be. Three versions were made: daytime, nighttime, and a completely dark version. The clock was also imposed onto the footage at closedown.
Christmas Cake	Christmas 1987 (Northern Ireland)	A rotating Christmas cake featuring a snowy scene including a house and trees. The circular sides have BBC 1 Northern Ireland written on it on both sides. It was only seen on Christmas Eve and Boxing Day and only during the evening due to the lack of continuity during daytime hours; on Christmas Day, Northern Ireland took the network feed.
Animated Tree	Christmas 1987 (Scotland)	A tree is seen, the text "CHRISTMAS ON" and "BBC 1 SCOTLAND" are circular around the tree, then the rest of the blue background turns into different rectangular colours.
Church Window	Christmas 1987 (Wales)	The COW globe is replaced with a church window, featuring a large light-decorated tree in a snowy scene as snow falls outside. A caption on the bottom of the windows reads ether "Christmas Eve", "Christmas Day" or "Boxing Day".
Snowglobe	Christmas 1988 (Wales)	The COW is replaced with a snowglobe, with a tree and a snowman reading a book of carols.
Music Box	Christmas 1988 (Scotland)	A box opens up with a spinning tree and BBC 1 on it. Scotland is seen on the front of the box.
Rotating Christmas Tree	Christmas 1989 (Scotland)	A tree is seen rotating, BBC 1 Scotland appears on the bottom in gold text, and the star on the top shines. 2 variants were made, one animated one, and the other being a still caption of the tree covered in snow.
Giant Spinning Top	Christmas 1989 (Wales)	A rotating spinning top rotates as pictures of Rudolphs, Santas, and penguins appear on it. Then the BBC 1 Wales Cymru logo appears on the bottom. BBC 2 used the same ident, but with a daytime background and a different logo.

== BBC World Service Television ==
=== Components of look ===
Computer Originated World as seen on BBC World Service Television

Upon the launch of BBC World Service Television on 11 March 1991 to replace BBC TV Europe, the channel reused the COW symbol. Technically, the globe itself remained the same with changes made only to presentational style and the caption below the globe and the whole look being brought into line with corporate branding at the time.

The ident itself was modified with the caption beneath showing a BBC corporate logo, with the slanted legend 'World Service Television' beneath, in the same style as used for regional variations of the BBC 1 ident at the time. No clock accompanied the look, due to the various time zones used around the world, with serious or news programming being introduced by the globe.

Presentational style mirrored by that used on BBC 1 and 2 at the time, and featured a static globe, positioned with Britain, Europe and Africa in view, with BBC logo beneath located in the top left corner of the screen. The logo was present throughout the presentation. Static captions also featured this globe symbol in the top left corner, located in a sidebar of generic lines, with programme title overlaid the image at the bottom of the screen. The station was also unusual, in the fact that it had a static, opaque permanent digital on-screen graphic (DOG) of the BBC logo in the top right corner of the screen.

The look appears to have been dropped on 26 January 1995.

=== Replacement ===
The look on BBC World Service Television was dropped in favour of a look consisting entirely of real and simulated flags on the screen, with a single large BBC logo in centre screen. This was to emphasise the role that news played on the channel, and to associate itself more closely as a news channel, rather than BBC 1. This is primarily evident, as the look was reused for that purpose upon the channel's split into BBC World, as well as the original BBC Arabic Television.

== Legacy ==
The COW was briefly revived on 8 January 2025 and again on 13 February 2025, where it was used to introduce Video Nasty (only aired on BBC One Northern Ireland) and EastEnders as part of commemorations for the latter programme's upcoming 40th anniversary (which, likewise, also marked the 40th anniversary of the ident itself); while most regions used archive recordings of the ident, BBC One Wales played the ident live using the original hardware. The channel's COW equipment had remained in storage at BBC Cymru Wales' former headquarters in Cardiff, and was personally retrieved by its head of presentation Matt Rosser so that it would not be thrown out during the move to New Broadcasting House. The equipment was found to still be in working order, only requiring repairs to its power supply, and additional hardware (including an SDI converter) to upconvert its analogue 576i output to 1080i high-definition for broadcast.

== See also ==
- Noddy (camera)
- BBC One "Virtual Globe" ident
- BBC World Service Television
- BBC Video

Preceded by Mirror globe	BBC television idents 18 February 1985 – 16 February 1991	Succeeded by Virtual globe
