= Noddy (camera) =

System for filming idents on BBC TV

The Noddy camera system

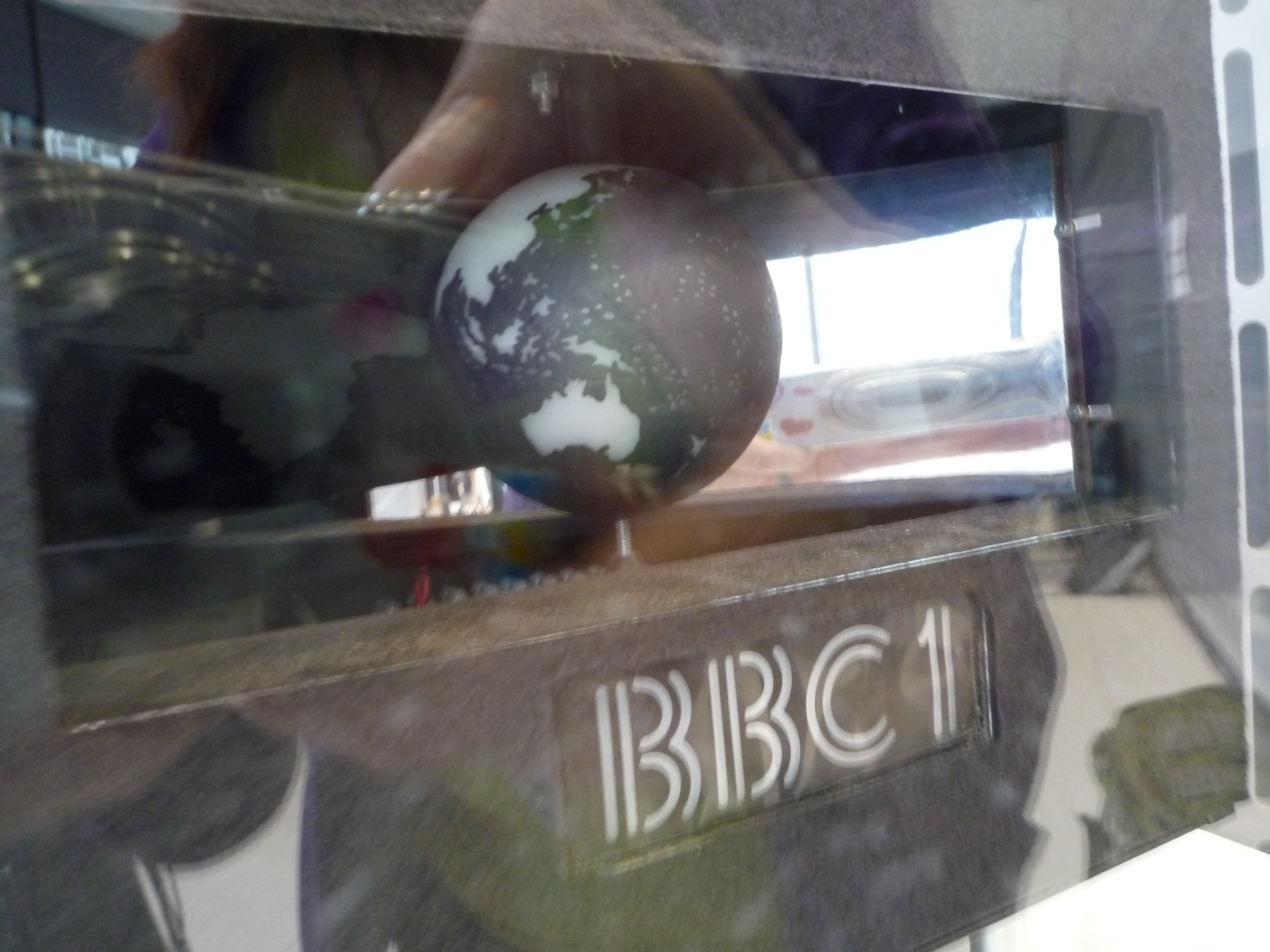
Noddy setup for filming the BBC 1 mirror globe ident

The Noddy was a camera system used for generating idents for the BBC One and BBC Two television channels from late 1963 to February 1985.

The Noddy video camera was controlled by a servomotor to pan and tilt (or 'nod', hence the name Noddy) across a set of pre-arranged physical objects or captions. The camera recorded in black-and-white, with colour electronically added to its output. This system eliminated the delay associated with swapping graphics upon a conventional copy stand. It also allowed clearance for more substantial objects such as a clock or globe.

== History ==
The BBC first employed the system in the 1960s, before the advent of colour. The system's remote operation allowed the operator to control it with ease, and allowed the idents to be of no fixed length as the clock symbols could continue for many minutes at a time. A smaller black and white camera was introduced as camera technology progressed and, from 1969, a process was introduced to add colour signals to the camera output. This electronic addition of colour was convenient and made the networks' rebrands easy to perform.

== BBC One mirror globes ==
The most famous idents captured by the Noddy system were the BBC One mirror globes used between 1969 and 1985, albeit with minor colour changes. The system consisted of an internally lit, rotating globe in front of a concave mirror. The oceans were painted onto the globe in metallic black paint, leaving the land masses as unpainted patches.

=== 1969–1974 ===
Electronically coloured BBC 1 globe ident, used between 1969 and 1974

The original globe ident, introduced at midnight on 15 November 1969, featured blue continents and logo against a black background. The logo included the word 'COLOUR' after the BBC One (then BBC 1) corporate logo, to identify the new programme format and act as an advertisement to the vast majority of viewers who were still watching in black and white (as the colour version of the television licence, which financed the BBC, was much more expensive). Full colour broadcasts across the UK did not become available until 1976. The colours of blue and black were chosen because they were still easily distinguishable to those with black-and-white televisions. Another version of the globe without the 'COLOUR' logo was used before black-and-white programmes, of which there were still many in the BBC One schedule in the early 70s.

The globe ident was modified sometime in 1971 to include a new BBC logo with rounded corners and 'COLOUR' in a slightly thinner typeface, (Note: It's unknown how long this version was used for, as very little evidence of it survives.) and then again a few months later to include an italic serif font for the 'COLOUR' legend and wider gaps in the BBC 1 logo.

=== 1974–1981 ===
A second BBC 1 ident colour scheme, used between 1974 and 1981

The second of three major revisions to the mirror globe appeared shortly after Christmas 1974, with yellow continents over a dark blue background and the term 'COLOUR' removed. The legend 'BBC 1' was rendered in white, using a heavy weight of the Futura typeface. The physical globe model itself remained the same one in use since 1969, however, and would only be replaced in late February 1976; further modifications were made until stabilising in c. September 1977.

=== 1981–1985 ===
The third and final incarnation of the globe ident (1981–1985, 2012 during BBC One Northern Ireland's analogue switch-off)

The third and final major revision of the ident appeared at 5.10 pm on 5 September 1981. (Note: The previous versions of the globe and clock were in use until 10.15 am, before that day's edition of Grandstand.) It incorporated the double-striped BBC 1 logo, which had already been in use on slides and promotions for several years by that point, and initially sported a duller, darker colour scheme than its predecessor; this was modified the following Monday to a brighter blue background and lime green continents, which remained until February 1985. Further changes to this version of the mirror globe (which included reducing the size of the BBC 1 logo and repainting the globe) occurred over the course of a year, stabilising in August 1982.

The globe model in the machinery was altered over the years as it had to be frequently re-painted. This led to a number of odd variations: the tip of South Africa, the Cape Fold Mountains, was pointed in the August 1982 model, and the Pacific islands were more pronounced in others.

In 2007, BBC 1 aired the second series of Life on Mars, set in 1973. As part of the presentation, the series trailed with a computer recreation of the 1973-era mirrored globe ident. BBC Wales, who produced the show, was able to use its original globe model to recreate the ident more faithfully, also including period appropriate dual language branding and continuity announcers from that era. (Note: BBC Cymru Wales had used its own bespoke presentation in the early 1970s, and would not use the mirror globe until c. 1976.)

In 2014, the mirrored globe was added to the BBC's A History of the World object collection.

On 13 November 2017, the 1981 globe returned for BBC Children in Need Rocks the Eighties.

== Other idents ==
A number of other presentational devices were captured by the Noddy, the main one of these being the analogue clock. To allow enough light onto the model, a light was fixed onto the camera to shine onto the clock and other idents; this light was not used on the main ident, however, which was internally lit. In any event, the mirrored background would have reflected the external light back at the camera and caused glare. The clock was mechanical, and featured numerals indicated by double lines that increased in thickness the further round the clockface. The clock also featured a 'polo mint' centre. The clock is quite distinctive, and became strongly associated with the BBC. The clock's colour and legend never differed from that of the main ident. An alternative wall-mounted clock with its own dedicated camera started being used at some point in the late 1970s. This clock had thicker hands and less judder on the second hand than its Noddy counterpart, and was used for direct cuts to the globe at closedown.

The Noddy system was also used on BBC Two, from the station's launch in 1964 until the introduction of the electronically generated clock in September 1980, and by the Open University from 1971 until 1981.

Following BBC 2's 1979 rebrand to the electronic striped 2 ident, technicians started working on an electronic clock to accompany the new look in 1981. In early December 1981, this replaced the mechanical version. The new clock featured a single uniform line thickness all the way round except at 12, 3, 6, and 9, where the lines were doubled. The polo mint centre was also removed in favour of a central dot. However, the electronic clock only launched in 1981 for England. Northern Ireland launched an electronic clock in October 1984 (using a slide in the interim) in conjunction with an upgrade to its continuity booth, while Wales and Scotland retained the mechanical clock until the launch of the next BBC 1 ident in 1985.

The looks were also accompanied by static programme captions. The captions for the 1969 to 1974 look used the legend of the ident at the bottom of the screen. They continued for a while after the new BBC 1 logo was introduced. However, the style was changed in 1976 to feature a banner at the top of the image with double striped lines and the double-striped BBC 1 logo that would only feature on the main ident 5 years later. This design was used until February 1985.

== Replacement ==
The mirrored globe was retired at 7 pm on 18 February 1985, with the first showing of the globe's replacement: the Computer Originated World or COW for short. The globe was retired because of the fact it was the only live mechanical model used on television and the maintenance required was making it difficult to use; even the 1981 rebrand caused a number of difficulties such as bad positioning, odd colours, and other errors. For example, on the ident's first couple of days, a severe problem with the colour scheme caused the colours which should have been dark blue and green to be a very dark navy and a pale yellow-green. For its first nine months, the ident was modified a few times. The globe was also becoming old fashioned, due to its long service since the introduction of colour.

The Noddy system was abandoned with the globe, as all idents and clocks were now electronically generated, and as a result the equipment was not needed. Programme slides remained the exception; slide scanners were still used for the live origination of programme slides until the late 1980s, when the programme slides then became stored electronically and generated with the Quantel Paintbox.

The globe's last networked appearance was at 5.35 pm on Monday 18 February, introducing a new series of Grange Hill, although viewers in the South East (Note: BBC London did not exist at the time.) would see it one more time before BBC London Plus at 6.35 pm, (Note: The nations and regions used their own branded versions of the globe in this junction.) making this its true final appearance. The accompanying clock made its final appearance at 6 pm, before the Six O'Clock News.

== NODD ==
The acronym NODD was first recorded in a web forum related to TV presentation, where an author not connected with the BBC claimed it stood for Nexus Orthicon Display Device. However, the term is not recognised among the many surviving Presentation and Engineering staff who worked with the system and internal BBC paperwork of the era specifically refers to the camera system as "Noddy".

Presentation's "Noddy" camera also had a companion, originally named "Big Ears", which was a dual monochrome slide scanner, thus allowing in-vision changes between slides. With the advent of colour, this was replaced with a Rank Cintel slide scanner, electronically similar to a flying spot telecine machine.

== Notes ==
| Preceded by Pre-1969 | BBC television idents 15 November 1969 – 18 February 1985 | Succeeded by Computer Originated World |
