= Logo of the BBC =

Logo used by the British Broadcasting Corporation

The official logo of the BBC used since 2021

The logo of the BBC, known as the BBC blocks, has been a brand identity for the corporation and its work since the 1950s in a variety of designs. Until 1958, the corporation had relied on its coat of arms for official documentation and correspondence, although it rarely appeared onscreen. With the increased role of television for the BBC in the 1960s, particularly after the foundation of the ITV network, the corporation used its logo to increase viewer familiarity and to standardise its image and content.

The logo has since been redesigned a number of times, most recently in 2021. From 1958, there have been six different BBC logos. The first logo of the network was used from 1958 to 1963, the second from 1963 to 1992, the third from 1971 to 1992, the fourth from 1987 to 1997, the fifth from 1997 to 2021, while the sixth and current logo was adopted in October 2021.

== History ==
=== Before the logo ===
Logo of the BBC used from 1927 to 1946.

Logo of the BBC used from 1946 to 1953.

Before the BBC introduced its logo itself, in the form of the slanted boxes, the BBC used a variety of different symbols with which to represent itself. In printed media and corporation correspondence, it used the BBC coat of arms, while on screen, it used a different logo type. Originally, it used a stylised BBC text on early equipment, not unlike the caption that accompanied the BBC1 COW globe. This logo was rarely seen on screen, with captions containing the words "BBC Television Service" along with matching clock. In 1932, when the original reception room of the BBC Broadcasting House in London opened, a logo was laid in mosaic on the floor. This logo was merely a stylised entwining of two capital Bs, one facing either direction, linked by a C in the centre. This mosaic logo is still visible on the floor today, though the area no longer serves as the BBC's main reception room.

=== 1950s ===
The first 'Blocks' logo with italicised lettering, used between 1958 and 1963.

In 1953, Abram Games was commissioned to design an on-air image. Nicknamed the 'bat's wings', it consisted of a rounded brass contraption with a tiny spinning globe in its centre, with large wing-like protrusions flanked by lightning bolts on either side. For BBC Scotland, the globe in the centre was replaced by a lion.

The first incarnation of the BBC blocks logo appeared in 1958. It consisted of square boxes with slanted letters, not unlike the first slanted logo seen in the 1960s.

=== 1960s ===
The first slanted logo, introduced in 1963 and used concurrently with the next two slanted logos until 1992.

In the 1960s, the main BBC logo consisted of slanted boxes with italicised bold lettering. This type of logo would go on captions at the end of productions as well as on cameras and other equipment used by the BBC. They became important when popular BBC programmes and clips from the BBC archives were being sold to be aired on other networks and channels. It was in the early 1960s that the 'bat's wings' logo ceased to be used. It was superseded by the BBC TV logo within a circle, behind which would appear a map of Britain split into broadcast regions. This set the style for a succession of circular images. On 30 September 1963, the BBC's globe logo first appeared. This was a striped line broken in the middle by a globe, with BBC1 in block letters below it. When it appeared, the continuity announcer would say "This is BBC Television." while the globe spun. 1964 saw the creation of BBC1 and BBC2 brands, with the distinctive horizontal stripes across the screen.

In April 1964, BBC2 was launched. Its logo was similar to that of BBC1, featuring the distinctive horizontal stripe, but with a large 2 in the centre with the BBC blocks beneath. As part of the publicity campaign for the new channel, artist Desmond Marwood created images of a kangaroo, named Hullabaloo with a baby named Custard in its pouch, to represent the new station. In 1969, when BBC 1 began broadcasting in colour, it introduced the 'mirror globe' logo. This logo shows a rotating globe with a rounded mirror behind giving an illusion of a map behind the globe. The model is actually Black and White, but coloured blue and yellow on the TV. Below the globes there is a line and the words BBC1 COLOUR. The word 'colour' was included to remind viewers still watching in black and white to purchase a colour TV set. This logo was used concurrently with the 1971 and 1987 logos until 1992.

=== 1970s ===
The rounded off and slanted logo, used between 1971 and 1993.

In 1971, a new softer logo was made, rounding off the boxes and making the spaces between the boxes larger. This logo was used on BBC merchandise, as well as the BBC1 idents and the BBC2 clock. More now than ever, merchandise was being branded with the logo, as more productions were being sold via the BBC's American identity, Lionheart Television. Also, records and videos were now starting to be produced and a corporate identity was getting more and more essential to ensuring that the audience knew it was authentic and that the quality programmes they were watching could be attributed to the BBC. The mirror globe began using a more ornate font in 1972. From the mid-1970s to the mid-1980s, the BBC1 channel logo used several different fonts, but with each change the logo remained blue. At this time, BBC logos were mechanical models filmed by black-and-white cameras.

Colour was added afterwards, electronically, rendering it simple to change the colour as needed. In 1967, BBC2 introduced a logo featuring a blue 2 with a dot in the curve of the 2 and the word COLOUR underneath. In 1979, BBC2 debuted the first-ever computer-generated logo, a 2 flanked by a double line on the side. The symbols appeared on a black background, then disappeared. This logo remained in use concurrently with the 1963 and 1987 logos until 1993.

=== 1980s ===
The underlined and final slanted logo, used between 1987 and 1997.

In late 1987, the BBC produced yet another new logo. Since the last one was made, a consumer brand was becoming part of nearly every TV station and corporation at the time (and, at ITV, had been so for many years). The BBC needed a strong and unified identity, and a change of said identity was key. Michael Peters was hired to design this all-inclusive BBC identity for the corporation. They modified the then-current logo by sharpening up the parallelogram edges again and set them to an angle of 17 degrees without reducing the size of the spaces between the boxes. They also sharpened up the text to make it match the clarity of the logo itself. The typeface used was Helvetica Neue. Also, under-logo lines were added to the logo for the first time. These lines were coloured blue, red, green to reflect the three phosphors of colour cathode-ray tube television, and the other three countries of the UK, which are Scotland, Wales and Northern Ireland, respectively. These appeared on the BBC national-region identities from their debut in 1988 and its gradual television debut over the period between 1988 and 1991.

Previously, in 1986, the electronically generated BBC2 logo was updated. The number 2 was replaced with the word TWO. The letters were white, 3D letters on a white background with red striping on the letter T as well as green and blue striping on the letter W. The word TWO appeared and faded on the white background.

The rebrands of both BBC1 and BBC2 in February 1991 were also based on the then-current BBC corporate identity, when these two channels were given a total corporate look, unlike previous ways of branding the channels. BBC Radio Clwyd continued to use this logo until the station was closed in around August 1998, and the 1987 logo continued as an in-credit logo.

==== Variants of the 1987 BBC logo ====
Blue version used in Scotland.

Red version used in Wales.

Green version used in Northern Ireland.

The flag of the BBC between 1987 and 1997.

=== 1990s ===
The straight BBC logo, used between 4 October 1997 and 19 October 2021.

In the mid-1990s, when employed to rebrand BBC1, Martin Lambie-Nairn suggested that he look into the current logo choice and see what he could do, given that, the BBC at the time was also looking into the BBC brand as a whole. What he noticed, was that the BBC had a system that meant that every service or department had a different logo scheme. It had a BBC logo and the name with character. Lambie-Nairn decided to address this when he took on the project, as with all these logos, the core brand itself was severely weakened. It was also appropriate to look at the way the BBC was branded, as the BBC was about to take off in digital television and the internet, among other different ventures. After seeing a number of problems with the then-current logo, he decided that a new logo was necessary. The logo was technically unsuitable on-screen. When shrunk, it lost the lines underneath and the counters (the sections in the Bs) and also, when in colour on a colour photo, it again disappeared or parts vanished. Also, on a TV or computer, diagonals are difficult to work with as the logos pixelate, and anti-aliasing is required to make the logo work. The previous logo also followed the idea of the slanted boxes, and related the BBC back to the very first logo in the 1950s and 1960s, which was not what the corporation wanted at that time. Technically, the logo never looked comfortable next to the brand and straight letters. Finally, it was expensive to print as stationery would always have 4-colour letterheads, and alongside other BBC brands could mean anything up to 10-colour letterheads and stationery.

Lambie-Nairn's solution was the BBC logo that was introduced on 4 October 1997. By straightening up the boxes and letters, it removed all the problems associated with diagonals and those associated with disappearing lines. This kept the boxes' shape, so that it would still be familiar with what people know about the BBC. The typeface used is Gill Sans, made by Eric Gill. It was chosen because it was elegant and robust and has a timeless appeal: the typeface had been created 60 years before and so avoided the typeface looking outdated at a later date. This typeface also eliminated the disappearing counters issue, as the counters of the Bs were much larger. Some of Gill's statues adorn the exterior of Broadcasting House. The logo was also designed so that anything could be added after the BBC logo, be it department, corporate, brand, TV, radio, etc. Also, by using this system, everything looked as if it came from the same organisation, and it was also easy to add new logos. This system also used only black-and-white letterheads, meaning a big cost saving to the BBC and the licence-fee payer. Beginning in 1997 and becoming more common in the 2000s, this logo was used as a brand watermark within the first few seconds or minutes of many BBC-made programmes, by fading the logo in and out near the bottom of the screen. As of 2023, this practice is rarely used, although a brief animation using the 2022 variant was shown in the beginning of the Eurovision Song Contest 2023 grand final.

The only visible issue with the system was that the logo for the BBC television and radio brands did not reflect their genre or appeal to the tastes of their target audiences. Lambie-Nairn proposed to show this as personality in the idents themselves, and evidence of this can be seen in the idents for BBC One made just after the logo was introduced. The BBC One balloons were made using the new logo, with the personality device in the balloons. The BBC Two idents, the 2s remained the same but with the new logo added underneath, used with CBBC logo.

==== Variants of the 1997 BBC logo ====
The dark blue flag of the BBC between 1997 and 2021.

The orange flag variant of the BBC between 1997 and 2021.

=== 2000s and 2010s ===
In 2002, the BBC One balloon idents were discontinued, as was the globe. The BBC Two idents that were in use since 1991 had been discontinued shortly before. BBC One's idents were replaced with a new series known as "Rhythm & Movement", which were themed around dance and multiculturalism. Meanwhile, BBC Two shifted to new "personality"-themed idents to reflect its current programming direction, where the 2 was now depicted as a three-dimensional, anthropomorphic character. In 2006, BBC One adopted new "Circle" idents, which involved circles being formed by nature or people and their actions. The following year, BBC Two adopted a "Window on the World" theme for its idents, where the 2 symbol was now represented as a cut-out in various environments. In late-2014, the previous BBC Two idents used from 1991 were revived in honour of the channel's 50th anniversary.

In 2017, BBC One adopted a new series of idents known as "Oneness", directed by photographer Martin Parr, which feature groups of people in various locations across the UK. In 2018, BBC Two adopted new idents with a curve theme, evoking the shape of a 2.

=== 2020s ===
The Reith version of the BBC logo, in use since 20 October 2021.

In 2021, the BBC began to phase in the first modification to its corporate logo in 24 years. Whilst still featuring the same basic form of its predecessor, the blocks were given more space between them similar to the 1971 and 1987 slanted logos and slightly smaller lettering similar to the last slanted logo from 1987, and the typeface was changed from Gill Sans to the BBC's current corporate typeface BBC Reith Sans. The new logo was part of a larger corporate rebranding by BBC Creative and Wolff Olins in anticipation of the corporation's 100th anniversary in 2022, aiming to create a more cohesive and consistent identity among the BBC's platforms and outlets: new logos featuring Reith wordmarks were adopted, and services such as iPlayer, News, Sounds, and Sport were given icons formed from arrangements of three coloured rectangles representing the blocks.

The logo was soft launched by the BBC Select streaming service in North America and BBC Kids channel in Australia. Eventually, the Reith blocks were officially adopted by most of the BBC's domestic television services on 20 October 2021 as part of a rebranding codenamed "Chameleon", which introduced new animated transitions (framed by the BBC logo and channel name at the top and bottom centre of the screen respectively) in promos and continuity. Most existing idents were retained upon the 20 October 2021 launch, although with modifications to suit the new transitions. BBC Three returned to linear television on 1 February 2022, with its new idents centred around a trio of personified, animated hands.

BBC One launched its Lens idents on 1 April 2022; developed by BBC Creative and London based branding agency ManvsMachine, the idents feature scenes of activities in community spaces, with a circular "lens" effect revealing scenes of other activities taking place at the same location at different times of the day. On 15 March 2023, CBBC and CBeebies introduced new logos and idents incorporating the new branding scheme, with CBBC's idents featuring abstract scenes involving three snake-like "flooms" personifying the blocks, and CBeebies adopting its first-ever new logo, updating its traditional "bug" mascots with a more square-like shape to personify the blocks. In April 2023, concurrent with the unification of the BBC News channel with BBC World News, the channel also migrated to the "Chameleon" scheme for promos and its trademark "countdown" sequence.

The new BBC logo designs have not been without controversy, reportedly costing more than £7.26 million of the broadcaster's hypothecated tax revenue, and with many pundits commenting that the new designs are barely distinguishable from their immediate predecessors.

==== Variants of the 2021 BBC logo ====
The logo with "This Is Our" tagline

== See also ==
- History of BBC television idents
- Noddy, the BBC1 mirrored globe ident.
