= Timeline of schools broadcasts in the UK =

This is a timeline of the broadcasting of schools programmes on television in the UK.

== 1950s ==
- 1957
  - 13 May – The very first UK broadcast of a television programme for schools takes place. It is transmitted by London's ITV contractor Associated-Rediffusion.
  - 24 September – The BBC broadcasts its first programmes for schools.
- 1958
  - No events.
- 1959
  - No events.

== 1960s ==
- 1960
  - 19 September – BBC Schools starts using the Pie Chart ident to coincide with the first morning broadcasts which are branded as For the Schools.
- 1961
  - No events.
- 1962
  - No events.
- 1963
  - No events.
- 1964
  - No events.
- 1965
  - BBC Schools programmes are now branded as For Schools and Colleges.
- 1966
  - No events.
- 1967
  - No events.
- 1968
  - No events.
- 1969
  - No events.

== 1970s ==
- 1970
  - ITV Schools programmes start being broadcast in colour.
- 1971
  - No events.
- 1972
  - September – Following a law change which removed all restrictions on broadcasting hours, ITV is able to launch an afternoon service and ITV Schools transfers to a new morning slot with programmes shown between 9:30am and midday.
- 1973
  - No events.
- 1974
  - 23 September – The presentation of BBC Schools changes with the introduction of the blue diamond on a black background with the BBC1 legend. It is commissioned to mark the start of BBC schools programmes being broadcast in colour.
- 1975
  - No events.
- 1976
  - No events.
- 1977
  - 19 September – The presentation of BBC Schools changes with the introduction of the countdown clock of disappearing dots around a spinning 'Schools and Colleges' legend. Special holding captions with the phrase 'Follows Shortly' were beginning to be used for junctions longer than the 60 seconds that the ident required.
- 1978
  - No events.
- 1979
  - ITV does not broadcast schools programming during the Autumn term due to the strike which had kept ITV off the air for through the late Summer and early Autumn of 1979. The programming that was due for transmission in the Autumn term is transferred to the Spring and Summer terms of 1980.

== 1980s ==
- 1980
  - No events.
- 1981
  - No events.
- 1982
  - January – A computerised version of the BBC Schools clock is brought into service, replacing the mechanical device used since 1977.
  - April–June – The Falklands War sees schools programmes sometimes being shown on BBC2 to allow BBC1 to provide coverage of the latest developments. A hastily added BBC2 Schools ident was used, with the replaced caption being the orange logo on a black background box.
- 1983
  - 24 June – BBC Schools programmes are broadcast on BBC1 for the final time, ahead of their move to BBC2 in the Autumn.
  - 19 September – Programmes for schools and colleges are transferred to BBC2 and an all-day educational strand called Daytime on Two is launched so that the adult educational programming previously shown on Mondays and Tuesdays on BBC2 can continue to be shown. The new service includes a special sequence of Ceefax pages called the Daytime on Two information Service which is broadcast during the longer gaps between programmes. A special version of the striped 2 ident is created, featuring an orange background instead of the usual black. Clocks were not used alongside the look but the 'Follows Shortly' captions were retained.
- 1984
  - Summer term – As in previous years, fewer schools programmes are aired by the BBC during the Summer term with the number of programmes decreasing as the term progresses. Pages from Ceefax is therefore shown for an increasing part of the day, with the general Ceefax miscellenany shown during the longer breaks, such as lunchtime due to adult education not being shown during the Summer term, with the Daytime on Two Information Service restricted to the shorter breaks. ITV continues to show a full morning of schools programmes throughout the entire Summer term.
- 1985
  - 28 June – The end of the 1984/85 school year sees the final broadcast of the Ceefax Daytime on Two information service and when Daytime on Two returns in September, all gaps of 10 minutes or less are filled by a 'Follows Shortly' caption over music, before cutting to the ident and announcement. Breaks of more than 10 minutes are filled with the usual Ceefax miscellenary.
- 1986
  - 21 March – At 2:30pm, the special version of the striped 2 ident is shown for the final time.
  - 21 April – Following the rebranding of BBC2 and the launch of the white embossed TWO the previous month, no special ident is used to introduce Daytime on Two programmes although a later addition is a 15-second countdown timer, displaying the seconds in a box, usually located in the top right corner of the screen.
  - 22 September – From the start of the 1986/87 school year, Daytime on Two ends slightly earlier, at 2:15pm or 2:35pm instead of 3pm.
- 1987
  - 29 June – Schools programmes are broadcast on ITV for the final time.
  - 14 September – ITV Schools transfers to Channel 4 and S4C. The programmes are shown at the same time as they were broadcast on ITV, between 9:30am and 12noon. Just two pieces of interval music are used, "The Journey" for a 3D holding device and "Just a Minute" which featured a redesigned clock.
- 1988
  - No events.
- 1989
  - No events.

== 1990s ==
- 1990
  - Summer – For the first time, there are no programme breaks during the Summer term's Daytime on Two output with programmes shown non-stop between 9am and 2:15pm.
- 1991
  - 16 February – Following the rebrand of TWO to BBC2, including the introduction of the '2' idents, no special presentation is used to mark schools programmes. The 'Follows Shortly' captions are phased out in place of promotions of other appropriate programmes.
- 1992
  - June – ITV Schools opt-outs in the Grampian Television, Scottish Television, Border Television and Ulster Television (UTV) regions are broadcast for the final time, ahead of Channel 4 being spun off from IBA control. S4C in Wales continues to opt-out of some English programmes for its Welsh-language programmes.
- 1993
  - 19 January – Schools programmes are shown overnight on BBC2 for the first time as part of a new experiment called Night School. The broadcasts are generally either subject blocks or series blocks.
  - 28 June – The final ITV Schools programmes are shown on Channel 4.
  - 20 September – Schools programmes continue to be shown on Channel 4 under their own branding of Channel 4 Schools, along with new idents and on S4C, schools programming is rebranded as S4C Ysgollon.
- 1994
  - No events.
- 1995
  - 9 October – BBC Learning Zone is launched and the output includes schools programming aimed at secondary school pupils. Primary schools programming continues to be shown during the morning.
- 1996
  - No events.
- 1997
  - June – BBC Schools programmes are broadcast under the Daytime on Two brand for the final time.
  - September – Schools programmes on the BBC are now branded under the title of School Programmes with broadcasts limited to the morning hours.
- 1998
  - BBC Bitesize is launched as a free online study support resource for school-age pupils in the United Kingdom to aid pupils in both schoolwork and for older pupils, exams.
- 1999
  - 1 June – BBC Knowledge launches as part of the BBC's move into digital television. The new channel broadcasts a mix of educational and informative programming, aimed at both adults and children. Original programming included a GCSE survival guide and technology series The Kit, aimed at getting children online.
  - Autumn – Secondary school programming is moved permanently to overnight transmissions and is aired as part of the BBC Learning Zone. Programmes aimed at primary school children continue to be shown during the day.

== 2000s ==
- 2000
  - April – Channel 4 rebrands its schools programming as 4Learning.
- 2001
  - No events.
- 2002
  - 11 February – The new CBBC channel launches and it airs schools programmes during the day as part of their remit. They are broadcast as a strand called Class TV, shown during schools hours (usually repeats of previous programmes, rather than new ones).
  - 2 March – BBC Knowledge closes.
- 2003
  - 13 January – Schools programmes on BBC Two are given an additional 10–30 minute timeslot at 1pm on Mondays and Tuesdays.
- 2004
  - No events.
- 2005
  - After 18 years, Channel 4 ends its packaged schools television service.
- 2006
  - No events.
- 2007
  - December – Schools programmes are broadcast on Channel 4 for the final time.
- 2008
  - 20 March – The remit of CBBC is altered to remove the schools programming element from the channel.
  - 13 May – The 1pm schools programming slot on BBC Two ends after 5 years.
  - 20 June – S4C broadcasts the final day of Ysgolion, its Welsh schools programming.
- 2009
  - No events.

== 2010s ==
- 2010
  - 26 March – Primary school programming is shown on BBC Two during the day for the final time. From next term, primary schools broadcasts become part of the overnight BBC Learning Zone with series shown as a back-to-back set rather than over several weeks.
- 2011
  - No events.
- 2012
  - No events.
- 2013
  - No events.
- 2014
  - No events.
- 2015
  - 24 July – BBC Learning Zone ends "due to budget cuts". This sees the end of the transmission of schools programmes on the BBC after 58 years, and as from this date, all schools programming moves online.
- 2016
  - No events.
- 2017
  - No events.
- 2018
  - No events.
- 2019
  - December – CBBC brings back Class TV with 'Live Lessons' presented by the CBBC presenting team on late weekday mornings.

== 2020s ==
- 2020
  - 20 April – With the onset of the COVID-19 pandemic and the national quarantine in England, the BBC begins offering daily educational programming to help children with schoolwork at home. It is described as the biggest education push "in its history".
- 2021
  - 11 January – The COVID-19 pandemic in the United Kingdom and the closure of schools around the country during the national quarantine sees CBBC and BBC Two broadcast shows from the BBC Bitesize service for primary-school-aged children. These shows feature a mix of archive, live and newly filmed content.
