= DARS =

DARS may refer to:

- DARS (gene), a human gene
- DARS (radar) Deployable Air operations centre, Recognized air picture production centre, Sensor Fusion Post, a NATO mobile deployable Command & Control radar system
- DoD Architecture Registry System
- Texas Department of Assistive and Rehabilitative Services, a state agency that works with Texans with disabilities and children with developmental delays
- Digital Audio Radio Service, any type of digital radio service including Satellite DARS used by Sirius XM Radio
- Digital Audio Reference Signal, an AES standard for synchronizing devices
- Motorway Company in the Republic of Slovenia (Slovene: Družba za avtoceste v Republiki Sloveniji, DARS)
- DARS caste living in District Tharparkar and Umerkot
- Dars, a brand of chocolate bars produced in Japan by Morinaga & Company
- DnaA-reactivating sequences (DARS)
- Dars (TV show), an educational show aimed at schoolchildren in Afghanistan
