= BBC School Radio =

Division of the BBC

Coordinates: 51°30′49″N 0°13′44″W

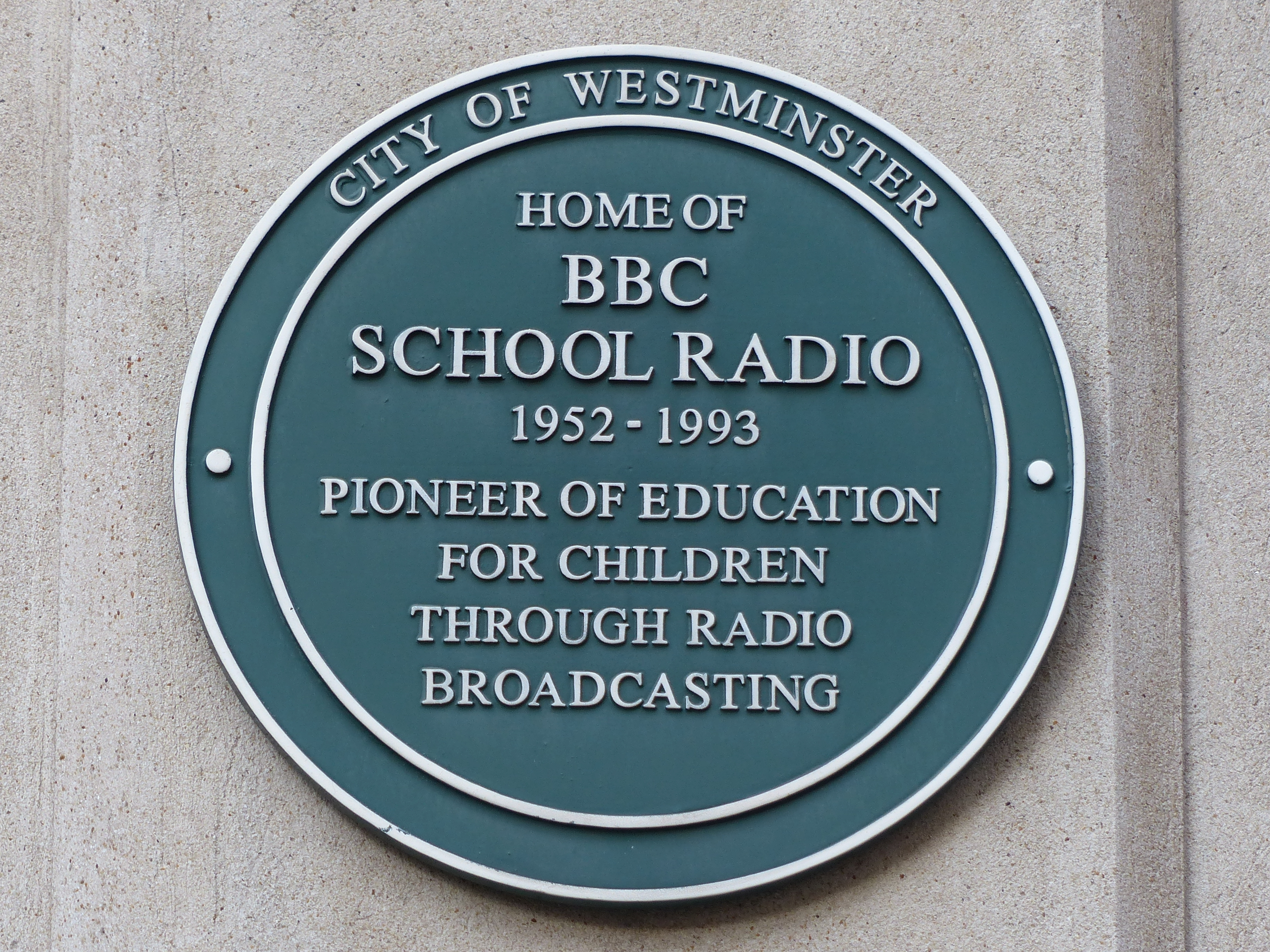
- Green plaque on a building in Portland Place, recording its former use as the home of BBC School Radio broadcasts.
- Network: See stations below
- Launched: 4 April 1924; 102 years ago
- Closed: 28 June 2018; 8 years ago
- Division of: BBC Learning
- Country of origin: United Kingdom
- Owner: British Broadcasting Company (1924); British Broadcasting Corporation (1927)
- Headquarters: Bridge House, MediaCityUK, Salford (2011–present)
- Format: Educational programming
- Original language: Primarily English
- Official website: www.bbc.co.uk/schoolradio

BBC School Radio is a division of the BBC providing audio learning resources for primary schools in the United Kingdom. Despite its name, it did not operate its own dedicated, standalone radio station. Instead, BBC School Radio broadcast educational programs through existing BBC radio networks and, in later years, transitioned entirely to online streaming and podcasts.

== History ==
The first broadcast to schools was organised by the privately owned British Broadcasting Company and given by the composer Sir Walford Davies, Professor of Music at Gresham College. It was transmitted from Britain's second ever radio station, 2LO in London, on 4 April 1924.

Following the dissolution of the British Broadcasting Company on 31 December 1926 and the transfer of its assets to the Crown-chartered British Broadcasting Corporation, the Carnegie United Kingdom Trust funded a project on broadcasting to schools based on feedback collected from teachers in Kent. In 1928 the Central Council for School Broadcasting (CCSB) was established; its first two chairmen were Herbert Fisher and Eustace Percy, 1st Baron Percy of Newcastle. For each curriculum subject covered in the broadcasts there was a subject committee, staffed by teachers.

From 1929 to 1957, the first Director of School Broadcasting was Mary Somerville. By the 1930s, secondary schools were included in the target audience and broadcasts were added covering foreign-language learning. Older listeners were also tuning in.

=== Second World War ===
During the Second World War, School Radio gained a new importance. Any regional variations were consolidated into a single home service for children with a five-minute news broadcast that was designed to explain the confusing circumstances. By 1942, half of all British schools were listening.

=== Post war ===
The School Broadcasting Council for the United Kingdom had been set up in 1947, replacing the CCSB, and included Scotland and Wales. In 1953, 25,691 British schools were registered for school radio; 9.55am, 11am and 2pm were for primary schools; 11.20am, 2.20pm and 2.40pm were for secondary modern schools; 11.40am was for grammar schools.

After the Newsom Report in 1963, more series were made about the transition from school to work. The 1960s to 1980s were regarded as a 'golden age' for British schools radio broadcasting, and by the early 1970s, around 90% of schools were using the School Radio service. The BBC produced around 80 series per year for School Radio, which amounted to around 16 hours per week. From 1983, older programmes were available on cassette from the Centre of Educational Technology in Mold, Flintshire.

Originally broadcast on the BBC Home Service, the programmes transferred to BBC Radio 4 when that network replaced the Home Service in 1967. They were broadcast on all frequencies until the start of the 1973/74 school year when they were heard only on Radio 4's VHF/FM frequencies. However Radio 4 had limited VHF coverage in Scotland and Northern Ireland so schools programmes were broadcast on the VHF frequencies of BBC Radio Scotland and BBC Radio Ulster. Programming aired on weekdays from 10.00 (11.00 from 1984) to 12.00 (9.05 to 12.00 on Thursdays) and from 14.00 to 15.00.

In September 1990 they were transferred to BBC Radio 5 and BBC Radio 3 where they were broadcast in a single slot. On Radio 5 they were broadcast between 09.00 and 10.25 but they were repeated during Radio 3's overnight downtime so that they could benefit from FM quality broadcast as Radio 5 was only available on the lower quality MW waveband. The Radio 3 reruns were supplemented by additional programmes and were broadcast between 01.00 and 03.10.

In March 1994, Radio 5 was closed down to make way for the rolling news and sports service Radio 5 Live. Consequently, the daytime schools transmissions had to move so they were transferred to Radio 3, airing between 14.00 and 15.00, much to the chagrin of many of that station's listeners. From autumn 1996, all programmes were broadcast overnight on Radio 3 where they could be pre-recorded. Finally, a few years later, they were switched to the digital version of Radio 4, and this arrangement continued until over-the-air transmissions finally ended on 28 June 2018.

Since 2003, all school radio programmes have been available on the internet. The advent of podcasting has opened up a whole new avenue for the school radio service.

=== Diversification ===
TV broadcasting for schools began on 13 May 1957 (this had been hoped to begin in the late 1940s, but financial constraints prevented this). This was first broadcast by Associated-Rediffusion, not the BBC, though the BBC began schools television four months later. The BBC's television service had begun in 1936, and stopped for the war, to begin again in 1946. Schools television was shown on BBC1 until 1983 when it moved to BBC2.

No commercial broadcasters have ever produced educational radio programmes for schools.

=== Anniversary ===
On 4 April 1984, John Dunn presented a programme entitled Faith, Hope and Clarity, about the sixty years of BBC Schools Radio, on Radio 4. In the same year, from 3 to 5 July, a three-day festival was held at Pebble Mill Studios in Birmingham. It was hosted by Duncan Goodhew, Sue Lawley, and Rolf Harris.

=== Broadcasting sites ===
In 1939 the School Broadcasting Department moved to Bristol.

=== Presenters ===
Presenters have included -

- Sophie Aldred
- Sandra Kerr
- Simon Mayor
- Rhoda Power, sister of the historian Eileen Power, who produced historical output from 1927 until 1957
- Andy Day
- Cat Sandion
- Gemma Hunt
- Ben Faulks
- Steven Kynman

== Structure ==
In 2011 School Radio moved from its home on Wood Lane in London up to the newly built BBC Bridge House at MediaCityUK, also home to BBC Bitesize, BBC Teach, and BBC Children's and Education (CBeebies and CBBC). A small School Radio team is based in Scotland, producing programmes exclusively for Scotland's Curriculum for Excellence.

Broadcasts took place in the middle of the night (starting at 3.00) on Radio 4 Digital from Tuesdays to Thursdays. Programmes could be recorded under the Educational Recording Agency copyright laws, but podcasts are freely available, online and on the BBC iPlayer Radio app.

On 28 June 2018 School Radio ended its run on BBC Radio, instead becoming an online streaming and podcast download exclusive service, with content uploaded throughout the year, rather than following strict broadcast schedules.

== Content ==
Content is divided into twelve subjects:

- Collective Worship
- Curriculum for Excellence (programmes made exclusively for the Scottish curriculum).
- Drama
- Dance
- Early Learning
- English
- Geography
- History
- Mathematics
- Modern Foreign Languages
- Music
- PSHE - Citizenship

The English section includes a selection of abridgements of classic stories told by celebrity voices, including The Wind in the Willows, read by Bernard Cribbins, and The Tales of Hans Christian Andersen, read by Anne-Marie Duff, Sir Derek Jacobi, David Tennant and Penelope Wilton, amongst others.

Pre-recorded programmes were previously available on CD or DVD from BBC Schools' Broadcast Recordings, but these were eventually phased out in favour of online podcast versions.

=== Former programmes ===
- In the News - produced by Radio News and School Radio in the early 1980s for ages 9 to 12
- Wavelength - youth culture programme, with content borrowed from BBC Radio 1 in the 1980s
- Talks to Sixth Forms - introduced in 1935, and had distinguished speakers such as G. K. Chesterton, T. S. Eliot and E. M. Forster
- How Things Began - a natural history programme broadcast in 1943
- Make Up Your Mind - discussion programme for sixth formers

== See also ==
- BBC Schools – a similar television service inaugurated in 1957
- BBC Switch, BBC output for teenagers from 2007 to 2010
- The Big Toe Radio Show
- Newsround
- Becta – defunct agency created from what was the Council for Educational Technology
- BBC Learning
