= BBC Learning =

BBC Learning can refer to the following:

- A department of the BBC North Group division (formerly part of Interactive Factual and Learning), part of BBC Television
- The portal website created by BBC Learning
- A website created by BBC Worldwide
- The former name of defunct channel BBC Knowledge, prior to its launch
- BBC Schools, also known as BBC for Schools and Colleges, the educational programming strand set up by the BBC in 1957

== BBC Worldwide ==
The BBC Learning website was an attempt by BBC Worldwide to provide learning programs through the internet, the primary content of the website were sponsored list of universities and organizations which were providing e-learning, distance learning and similar courses.

BBC Learning with its limited content was not successful at attracting people and therefore BBC decided to close the website.

The public service side of the BBC continues to support educational and learning resources through a selection of websites. These websites include BBC Learning Zone and BBC Learning Languages.

The BBC have a section of their website called Bitesize for students, parents and teachers. See the Bitesize website https://www.bbc.co.uk/bitesize for details.
