= Dynamo (disambiguation) =

A dynamo is a magnetic device originally used as an electric generator.

Dynamo or Dinamo may also refer to:

== Places ==
- Dinamo (Moscow Metro), a station of the Moscow Metro, Moscow, Russia
- Dinamo (Yekaterinburg Metro), a station of the Yekaterinburg Metro, Yekaterinburg, Russia

== People ==
- Dynamo (magician), stage name of English magician Steven Frayne

== Arts, entertainment, and media ==
=== Fictional entities ===
- Dynamo (Fox Feature Syndicate), a 1940s comic book character
- Dynamo, a character from the Mega Man X series
- Dynamo, a comic book character and member of the T.H.U.N.D.E.R. Agents
- Dynamo, one of the "stalkers" from the movie The Running Man
- Captain Dynamo (character), a comic book superhero
- Crimson Dynamo, the name of several fictional characters in the Marvel Comics universe, most of whom have been supervillains
- Dynamo 5, a superhero team appearing in the comic book of the same name
- Dynamo Duck, the main character in the children's television series The Adventures of Dynamo Duck
- Dynamo Joe, a 1980s comic book series
- DynaMo, a 1998 BBC educational character

=== Music ===
==== Albums ====
- Dynamo (Avengers in Sci-Fi album), a 2010 album by Japanese electro-rock band Avengers in Sci-Fi
- Dynamo (Soda Stereo album), a 1992 album by Argentine rock band Soda Stereo

==== Other music ====
- Dynamo, a collaboration project of Muriel Moreno and Marc Collin of Nouvelle Vague
- Dynamo Open Air, an annual heavy metal music festival held in the Netherlands

=== Other arts, entertainment, and media ===
- DynaMo, a 1998 British educational programme and website
- Dynamo (play), a 1929 play by Eugene O'Neill
- Captain Dynamo (video game), a platform game developed by Codemasters and released for the Commodore Amiga and other platforms in 1993

== Brands and enterprises ==
- Dynamo, a brand of laundry detergent, owned by Colgate-Palmolive
- Dynamo Corporation, American manufacturer of pool and air hockey tables

== Science, engineering, and technology ==
=== Astrophysics ===
- Dynamo theory, a theory relating to magnetic fields of celestial bodies
- Solar dynamo, the physical process that generates the Sun's magnetic field

=== Software ===
- DYNAMO (programming language), a simulation language
- Dynamo (storage system), a distributed data store
- Amazon DynamoDB, a storage system

== Sports ==
=== Association football clubs ===
- Dinamo Zagreb, a Croatian football club
- Dynamo FC (disambiguation)
- FC Dinamo București, a Romanian football club
- FC Dynamo Kyiv, a Ukrainian football club
- FC Dynamo Poltava, a Ukrainian football club
- FC Dynamo Myrhorod, a Ukrainian football club
- Houston Dynamo FC, an American soccer club
- FC Dinamo Tbilisi, a Georgian football club
- Dinamo Batumi, a Georgian football club

=== Basketball teams ===
- BC Dynamo Moscow, a Russian basketball team
- BC Dynamo Saint Petersburg, a Russian basketball team
- BC Dinamo Tbilisi, a Georgian basketball team
- Dinamo Basket Sassari, an Italian basketball team
- CS Dinamo București (basketball), a Romanian basketball team

=== Ice hockey teams ===
- Dinamo Riga, an ice hockey team
- HC Dynamo Minsk, an ice hockey team
- HC Dinamo Moscow, an ice hockey team
- HC Dinamo Saint Petersburg, an ice hockey team

=== Multi-sports clubs ===
- Dynamo Sports Club, a multi-sports club of the Soviet Union
  - Dynamo (Ukraine), a child organization of the Soviet Union Dynamo Sports Club on territory of the Ukrainian SSR
- SC Dynamo Berlin, a multi-sportsclub in East Berlin, affiliated to SV Dynamo
- SV Dynamo, a multi-sports association of the German Democratic Republic
- CS Dinamo București, a multi-sports association of Ministry of Internal Affairs from Romania

=== Other sports ===
- Durham Dynamos, the limited overs team of Durham County Cricket Club
- Dynamo Kazan Bandy Club
- Dynamo Moscow (bandy club)
- Dynamo Moscow (women's volleyball)
- Dynamo Leningrad (bandy club)
- Futsal Dinamo, a Croatian futsal team
- CS Dinamo București (men's handball), a Romanian handball team

== Stadiums ==
=== Belarus ===
- Dinamo Stadium (Minsk), Belarus

=== Romania ===
- Dinamo Stadium (1951), Romania

=== Russia ===
- Dynamo Sports Palace, an indoor sporting arena in Moscow
- Dynamo Stadium (Moscow)
- Dynamo Stadium (Bryansk)
- Dynamo Stadium (Vladivostok)

=== Ukraine ===
- Valeriy Lobanovskyi Dynamo Stadium, Kyiv, Ukraine

=== Uzbekistan ===
- Dynamo Samarkand Stadium, Samarkand, Uzbekistan

== Other uses ==
- Dynamo (typeface), a typeface designed by K. Sommer for Ludwig & Mayer in 1930
- Dunwich Dynamo, an annual bicycle ride from London to Dunwich, England
- Jugendkulturhaus Dynamo, a cultural center for youth in Zürich
- Operation Dynamo, the World War II mass evacuation of Allied soldiers from Dunkirk
- In physics, dynamo theory is a mechanism by which a celestial body generates a magnetic field
- Dynamo (Alton Towers), a former ride at Alton Towers
