= Saul Nassé =

British television producer

- Born: Saul Edward Nassé; July 1965 (age 60); Bedford, Bedfordshire, UK
- Education: Robinson College, 1987
- Spouse: Carmen Pryce (m. 1999)

Saul Edward Nassé (born July 1965) is Chief Executive and Keeper of The National Archives, the official archive and publisher for the UK Government. He was formerly a television producer for the BBC, and was also chief executive of Cambridge Assessment, and a fellow of Robinson College, Cambridge. At the BBC he was successively Editor of Tomorrow's World, general manager of BBC Worldwide Productions in Mumbai and Controller of BBC Learning.

== Early life ==
Saul Edward Nassé was born in July 1965 in Bedford. At the age of seven his interest in science was inspired by Raymond Baxter, the first presenter of the BBC television programme Tomorrow's World. Nassé was educated at Bedford Modern School.

In 1987, Nassé graduated from Robinson College with a Master's in Natural Sciences.

== Career ==
Nassé began his career as a research scientist at Cranfield University. Nassé joined the BBC Science Department in 1990 where he worked as a producer. In 1997, following in the footsteps of Raymond Baxter who had inspired his interest in science, Nassé was made editor of Tomorrow's World, the youngest person to have held that position during the programme's near forty-year history. He also oversaw the launch of its website, one of the first that the BBC created.

In 2001, Nassé was made Editor, Youth at the BBC World Service Trust. During this time he produced a successful reality television show in India, Haath Se Haath Milaa, designed to increase awareness of AIDS. In 2004, he was made the BBC's Acting Head of Religion and Ethics producing programmes across all media and including coverage of the death of Pope John Paul II.

In 2007, Nassé became general manager of BBC Worldwide Productions in Mumbai, having led the BBC's Indian and Pakistan 07 season, to mark 60 years of independence. During his time in Mumbai he produced the Indian versions of Strictly Come Dancing and Baby Borrowers.

Nassé was appointed Controller of BBC Learning in 2010, responsible for all the BBC's formal learning content including Bitesize, the free online educational support service for children and informal learning content such as Stargazing Live and The Great British Bake Off. He was also charged with leading the move of BBC Learning to its new offices in Salford. During this time he was responsible for the BBC Domesday Reloaded project and for the BBC's role in creating the Your Paintings website, a project with Art UK to exhibit online the United Kingdom's entire collection of publicly owned oil paintings. An avid fan of Doctor Who, he was also the inspiration behind Death Is the Only Answer in 2011 and the online learning product iWonder.

In 2014, Nassé left the BBC and was appointed Chief Executive of Cambridge Assessment English. On his appointment, Nassé commented: ‘Digital is transforming the way people learn, making it a really exciting time to lead Cambridge English’. In 2018 he was promoted to become Group Chief Executive of Cambridge Assessment, where he served until 2021 when the newly formed Cambridge University Press & Assessment was created. Nassé was made a fellow of Robinson College, Cambridge in 2018, and served on its Council from 2022 to 2024.

The Department for Culture, Media & Sport appointed Nassé as the next Chief Executive and Keeper of The National Archives (United Kingdom) in April 2024, and he started in the role on 29 July 2024.

Nassé was a governor of the University of Sunderland and a trustee of the Teaching Awards Trust.

== Personal life ==
In 1999, Nassé married the journalist Carmen Pryce.
