= Dynamo (comics) =

Dynamo, in comics, may refer to:

- Dynamo (Fox Feature Syndicate), a 1940s comic book character
- Dynamo, one of the T.H.U.N.D.E.R. Agents
- Captain Dynamo (character), a comic book superhero
- Crimson Dynamo, the name of several Marvel Comics characters
- Dynamo 5, a superhero team formed of the children of Captain Dynamo
- Dynamo Boy, an expelled member of the Legion of Super-Heroes
- Dynamo Joe, a 1980s comic book series

== See also ==
- Dynamo (disambiguation)
