= Southern Careers Institute =

Coordinates: 30°13′36″N 97°47′1″W

- A Southern Careers Institute location in Austin, Texas.
- Motto: Get the Training. Get the Job.
- Type: For-profit
- Established: 1960
- Location: Austin, Brownsville, Harlingen, Corpus Christi, San Antonio, Pharr, Waco, Texas, United States
- Campus: Austin, Brownsville, Corpus Christi, Harlingen, San Antonio (2), Pharr, Online
- Website: www.scitexas.edu

Southern Careers Institute (SCI) is a private, for-profit post-secondary career and technical education institution with eight locations in Texas, US, founded in 1960. The school is accredited by the Council on Occupational Education and approved by the Texas Workforce Commission and the Texas Department of Assistive and Rehabilitative Services.

== Mission ==
The mission of Southern Careers Institute is to be a talent producer by delivering employer-tailored training that results in a Day-1 (TM) ready workforce.

== Locations ==
SCI has eight physical locations in Texas including Austin, Brownsville, Corpus Christi, Harlingen, Pharr, two in San Antonio, and Waco. SCI also offers courses online.

== Online ==
In 2014 Southern Careers Institute had one or more programs available in an online format to students across Texas. In 2016 the school partnered with CoderCamps to provide a Full Stack Javascript Program. In October 2017, SCI partnered with Woz U to provide software developing online with language options in Java, C#, JavaScript and Ruby.
