= Jeff James (public servant) =

British civil servant and executive

Jeff James CBE

Chief executive and Keeper The National Archives
- In office 29 July 2014 – April 2025
- Preceded by: Oliver Morley
- Succeeded by: Saul Nassé

Personal details
- Born: Jeffrey Daniel Dominic Walker; 11 March 1968 (age 58) Solihull, West Midlands, England
- Citizenship: British
- Spouse: Joanne Knight (m. 2010)
- Children: Three
- Education: Park View Comprehensive School
- Alma mater: Open University; University of Hertfordshire
- Occupation: Public servant

Military service
- Allegiance: United Kingdom
- Branch/service: Royal Navy
- Years of service: 1984–1998
- Rank: Chief Petty Officer
- Battles/wars: Cold War

Jeffrey Daniel Dominic James CBE (né Walker; born 11 March 1968) is a British public servant and executive, and former Royal Navy sailor. From 2014 until 2025, he was chief executive and Keeper of The National Archives.

In April 2025, James became chief executive of the Disclosure and Barring Service.

In the 2024 Birthday Honours, Jeff James was appointed a Commander of the Order of the British Empire (CBE) for services to archives and the public record.

== Early life and education ==
James was born on 11 March 1968 in Solihull, West Midlands, England. His surname at birth was Walker, but it was changed to James when he was later adopted by Edwin and Edith James. From 1979 to 1984, he was educated at Park View Comprehensive School in Chester-le-Street, County Durham.

James did not attend university straight after leaving school. Later, he studied for a degree with the Open University, a part-time distance learning university, and graduated with a Bachelor of Science in 2001. He studied history as a postgraduate at the University of Hertfordshire, completing his Master of Arts degree in 2010.

== Career ==
=== Military service ===
In 1984, James joined the Royal Navy as a rating. He trained as an electronic engineer, and specialised as a Weapons Engineering Artificer. He worked on the Resolution-class and Vanguard-class submarines, which operate the Polaris and Trident nuclear programmes respectively. In 1992, he was promoted to chief petty officer. He left the navy in September 1998 after 14 years.

=== Public service ===
After leaving the Royal Navy, James joined the University of Leeds as an IT technical support officer. He was later appointed Network Group Manager. From 2003 to 2004 he was operations manager of Swift Research Ltd, a Yorkshire-based market research agency. In 2004, he joined the British Library and worked in various operations management positions for the next three years. He ended his time at the British Library as Head of Operations.

In 2007, James joined The National Archives as Head of Access and Records Knowledge, before becoming Director of Operations in 2008. From June 2013 to July 2014 he was Deputy Chief executive of the Chartered Institute of Housing, and was "responsible for leading on strategy development, operational excellence, business performance and change management". In May 2014, he was announced as the next Chief executive and Keeper of The National Archives. He took up the appointment on 29 July 2014.

== Personal life ==
In 2010, James married Joanne Knight. Together they have three sons, including a set of twins.
