= Civil Pages =

Computer system used by UK Civil Service

The Civil Pages is a computer system that acts as a private social media site for the UK Civil Service. It was set up by The National Archives on behalf of the Cabinet Office. It debuted shortly after an incident where the head of MI6 was identified in a holiday snap on Facebook. The head of the Civil Service, Gus O'Donnell described civil pages as '... the Facebook of the Civil Service ... without the man in the Speedos'. The system is based on Confluence, an enterprise wiki from Atlassian and was developed by Adaptavist.
