= Fiona Crack =

BBC World Service executive

- Occupation: media executive
- Known for: launching BBC 100 Women and Dars

Fiona Crack is a British media executive employed by the BBC. She has worked for the BBC World Service. She was one of the founders of BBC 100 Women and she launched the educational programme Dars which supplies education to girls in Afghanistan. She was Head of Global Journalism for the BBC World Service. She announced Global Women in 2025.

== Life ==
Crack grew up in the Yorkshire Dales. She graduated from the University of Leeds in Politics and Journalism in 2003. She has worked at Amnesty International and for the BBC's long running current affairs programme Panorama. She worked for BBC News before she worked for the BBC World Service. She worked on the "World Have Your Say" radio programme whose weekly agenda was set by discussion created by its on-line listeners.

After the 2012 Delhi gang rape, then BBC Controller Liliane Landor, Crack (who was then a BBC editor) and other journalists, were inspired to create a series which became "100 Women". They intended to provide more "content from and about women." to address the under-representation of women in the media. Women to participate in the first programme were chosen by survey in 26 different language services. The series included an interview with Malala and this was the first that had ever been broadcast.

Crack was the editor of 100 Women and it was created from the BBC's involvement in its broadcasts in about 30 languages. Her small team partnered the 100 women into pairs asking them to keep in touch with each other for at least twelve months. Each pair member had a similar role but the two experience those roles in different parts of the global society. The pairing is designed to make sure that the initiative has a legacy.

In 2016 the 100 Women team realised that they needed to increase the impact of the women they were identifying each year. Only half of them had a Wikipedia page.

In 2021 she launched the educational programme Dars which provides education to the girls of Afghanistan who are forbidden to attend schools. The program has won funding from the Malala Fund.

In 2025 she was the Head of Global Journalism for the BBC World Service and Deputy Global Director of BBC News.

In 2025 the BBC announced "Global Women". The purpose is to deliver women related content across the BBC. The first programs were about Fatima Bio (the First Lady of Sierra Leone), KPop Demon Hunters’ Arden Cho and the issue of weaponised sexual violence in Ethiopia.

== Private life ==
Crack has spoken about looking after babies when she was a child. Her ambition to have one of her own took a blow when she survived cervical cancer at the age of 29. Medical intervention enabled her to become pregnant. All went well until the seventh month when her waters broke. More medical intervention appeared to be working, but the unborn baby, Willow, died after another emergency. She described herself as a "mother without a baby" when she told her story with five other women.

Her account of how her child died was mentioned in the UK parliament by Antoinette Sandbach during baby loss awareness week in October 2018.
