= Music Makers (TV series) =

- Genre: Educational
- Country of origin: United Kingdom
- Original language: English
- No. of series: 3
- No. of episodes: 20

Production
- Running time: 20 minutes

Original release
- Network: BBC Two
- Release: 20 September 1994 – 27 March 1998

Music Makers is a British educational television programme as part of the BBC Schools strand from 20 September 1994 to 27 March 1998. The programme is aimed at primary school children aged between 7 and 11.

== Episodes ==
=== Animals and the Environment (1994) ===
| No. overall | No. in series | Title | Original release date |
|---|---|---|---|
| 1 | 1 | "Finding Sounds" | 20 September 1994 |
| 2 | 2 | "Talking Drums" | 27 September 1994 |
| 3 | 3 | "Loud and Quiet" | 4 October 1994 |
| 4 | 4 | "Moving Along" | 11 October 1994 |
| 5 | 5 | "Water Music" | 18 October 1994 |
| 6 | 6 | "Birdsong" | 1 November 1994 |
| 7 | 7 | "Reflections" | 8 November 1994 |
| 8 | 8 | "The Rainforest" | 15 November 1994 |
| 9 | 9 | "Playing with Voices" | 22 November 1994 |
| 10 | 10 | "Fantastic Animals" | 29 November 1994 |

=== Infinity Diner (1997) ===
| No. overall | No. in series | Title | Original release date |
|---|---|---|---|
| 11 | 1 | "Beat and Rhythm" | 8 January 1997 |
| 12 | 2 | "Pitch" | 15 January 1997 |
| 13 | 3 | "Timbre" | 22 January 1997 |
| 14 | 4 | "Tempo" | 29 January 1997 |
| 15 | 5 | "Structure" | 5 February 1997 |

=== Professor Allegro's World of Music (1998) ===
| No. overall | No. in series | Title | Original release date |
|---|---|---|---|
| 16 | 1 | "In the City" | 27 February 1998 |
| 17 | 2 | "In the Mountains" | 6 March 1998 |
| 18 | 3 | "In the Ocean" | 13 March 1998 |
| 19 | 4 | "In the Snow" | 20 March 1998 |
| 20 | 5 | "In the Fields" | 27 March 1998 |
