= See You, See Me =

- Genre: Educational
- Country of origin: United Kingdom
- Original language: English
- No. of series: 32
- No. of episodes: 113

Production
- Running time: 15 minutes

Original release
- Network: BBC Two
- Release: 23 September 1994 – 14 November 2008

See You, See Me is a British educational television programme as part of the BBC Schools strand from 23 September 1994 to 14 November 2008. The programme is aimed at primary school children aged between 7 and 9.

== Episodes ==
=== Romans In Scotland (1994) ===
No. overall	No. in series	Title	Original release date
1	1	"Frontier People"	23 September 1994
2	2	"Home"	30 September 1994
3	3	"Food"	7 October 1994
4	4	"Health"	14 October 1994
5	5	"Trade"	21 October 1994

=== Maps (1994) ===
No. overall	No. in series	Title	Original release date
6	1	"Landscape"	4 November 1994
7	2	"Symbols"	11 November 1994
8	3	"Farm and Croft"	18 November 1994
9	4	"Towns"	25 November 1994
10	5	"Transport"	2 December 1994

=== Others (1995) ===
No. overall	No. in series	Title	Original release date
11	1	"Road Safety"	20 January 1995
12	2	"Making Friends"	27 January 1995

=== Transport (1995) ===
No. overall	No. in series	Title	Original release date
13	1	TBA	3 February 1995
14	2	"Trains"	10 February 1995
15	3	"Cycles"	17 February 1995

=== France (1995) ===
No. overall	No. in series	Title	Original release date
16	1	"Bon Voyage"	3 March 1995
17	2	"Bonnes Vacances"	10 March 1995
18	3	TBA	17 March 1995
19	4	TBA	24 March 1995
20	5	TBA	31 March 1995

=== 1960s (1995) ===
No. overall	No. in series	Title	Original release date
21	1	"Entertainment"	19 September 1995
22	2	"Home Life"	26 September 1995
23	3	"School Life"	3 October 1995
24	4	"Shops and Money"	10 October 1995
25	5	"Transport"	17 October 1995

=== Networks (1996) ===
No. overall	No. in series	Title	Original release date
26	1	"Getting Around Town"	16 January 1996
27	2	"Getting Out of Town"	23 January 1996
28	3	"Goods on the Move 1"	30 January 1996
29	4	"Goods on the Move 2"	6 February 1996
30	5	"Eurolinks"	13 February 1996

=== Design (1996) ===
No. overall	No. in series	Title	Original release date
31	1	"Designing Your Clothes"	27 February 1996
32	2	"Designing Your Place"	5 March 1996
33	3	"Designing Your Environment"	12 March 1996
34	4	"Designing To Tell"	19 March 1996
35	5	"Designing To Entertain"	26 March 1996

=== Weather (1997) ===
No. overall	No. in series	Title	Original release date
36	1	"Rain And Snow"	8 January 1997
37	2	"Sun And Wind"	15 January 1997
38	3	"Music"	22 January 1997
39	4	"Art"	29 January 1997
40	5	"Movement"	5 February 1997

=== Scotland (1997) ===
No. overall	No. in series	Title	Original release date
41	1	"Hill"	12 February 1997
42	2	"Glen"	26 February 1997
43	3	"River"	5 March 1997
44	4	"Moor"	12 March 1997
45	5	"Sea Loch"	19 March 1997

=== Health (1997) ===
No. overall	No. in series	Title	Original release date
46	1	"Food Is Fun"	23 September 1997
47	2	"Food Is Fuel"	30 September 1997
48	3	"Feeling Fine"	7 October 1997
49	4	"Breathe Easy"	14 October 1997
50	5	"Being Different"	28 October 1997

=== Vikings (1998) ===
No. overall	No. in series	Title	Original release date
51	1	"Sea"	13 January 1998
52	2	"Invaders"	20 January 1998
53	3	"Home And Settlements"	27 January 1998
54	4	"Women And Girls"	3 February 1998
55	5	"Trade And Crafts"	10 February 1998

=== Castles (1998) ===
No. overall	No. in series	Title	Original release date
56	1	"Building A Castle"	25 September 1998
57	2	"Living In A Castle"	2 October 1998
58	3	"Castle Under Siege"	9 October 1998
59	4	"Castle Banquet"	16 October 1998
60	5	"Castle At Leisure"	30 October 1998

=== Money (1999) ===
No. overall	No. in series	Title	Original release date
61	1	"What Is Money?"	15 January 1999
62	2	"What Is A Bank?"	22 January 1999
63	3	"Money At Work"	29 January 1999

=== Where We Live (1999) ===
No. overall	No. in series	Title	Original release date
64	1	"Falkirk And Stromness 1"	5 February 1999
65	2	"Falkirk And Stromness 2"	12 February 1999

=== Scotland's Inventors (2000) ===
No. overall	No. in series	Title	Original release date
66	1	"Communication - John Logie Baird"	21 January 2000
67	2	"Transport - James Watt"	28 January 2000
68	3	"Medicine - Alexander Fleming"	4 February 2000

=== Cycle Into Europe (2000) ===
No. overall	No. in series	Title	Original release date
69	1	"Good Cycling"	11 February 2000
70	2	"In The Town"	18 February 2000
71	3	"In The Country"	3 March 2000

=== Buildings Of Faith (2000) ===
No. overall	No. in series	Title	Original release date
72	1	"Christian Church"	10 March 2000
73	2	"Jewish Synagogue"	17 March 2000
74	3	"Moslem Mosque"	24 March 2000
75	4	"Sikh Gurdwara"	31 March 2000

=== Space (2000) ===
No. overall	No. in series	Title	Original release date
76	1	"Solar System"	11 October 2000
77	2	"Sun And Moon"	11 October 2000
78	3	"Space Quest"	18 October 2000

=== Farming (2000) ===
No. overall	No. in series	Title	Original release date
79	1	"On The Farm"	29 November 2000
80	2	"Farmer's Year"	6 December 2000

=== Picts And Scots (2001) ===
No. overall	No. in series	Title	Original release date
81	1	"Picts"	28 September 2001
82	2	"Scotti"	5 October 2001
83	3	"New Scots"	19 October 2001

=== Are You Eco-Friendly? (2003) ===
No. overall	No. in series	Title	Original release date
84	1	"Seashore"	13 January 2003
85	2	"Urban River"	20 January 2003
86	3	"Town"	27 January 2003
87	4	"Forest"	3 February 2003
88	5	"Mountain"	10 February 2003

=== Scotland's Physical Landscape - Highlands And Islands (2004) ===
No. overall	No. in series	Title	Original release date
89	1	"Grampian Tour: North East"	1 March 2004
90	2	"Northern Tour: Great Glen"	8 March 2004
91	3	"Island Tour: Island Hopping"	15 March 2004

=== Making Decisions (2004) ===
No. overall	No. in series	Title	Original release date
92	1	"At Home With Decisions"	22 March 2004
93	2	"Out And About With Tops"	29 March 2004

=== Skara Brae (2004) ===
No. overall	No. in series	Title	Original release date
94	1	"Evidence"	15 November 2004
95	2	"Discovery"	15 November 2004

=== Scotland's Physical Landscape - Central Lowlands (2005) ===
No. overall	No. in series	Title	Original release date
96	1	"Powerful Places"	10 January 2005
97	2	"Restless Rivers"	10 January 2005
98	3	"Volcanic Scotland"	10 January 2005

=== Scotland's Physical Landscape - Southern Uplands (2006) ===
No. overall	No. in series	Title	Original release date
99	1	TBA	10 January 2006
100	2	TBA	17 January 2006
101	3	TBA	24 January 2006

=== Risk (2006) ===
No. overall	No. in series	Title	Original release date
102	1	"Living Dangerously"	28 February 2006
103	2	"Stick to Your Guns"	7 March 2006

=== Vikings In Scotland (2007) ===
No. overall	No. in series	Title	Original release date
104	1	"Raiders: The Vikings Arrive"	2 March 2007
105	2	"From Vikings To Settlers"	9 March 2007
106	3	"Legacy Of The Norse"	16 March 2007

=== Treasure - Financial Capability (2007) ===
No. overall	No. in series	Title	Original release date
107	1	"Bounty And The Budget"	23 February 2007
108	2	"Debts And Doubloons"	30 March 2007

=== See Birds (2008) ===
No. overall	No. in series	Title	Original release date
109	1	"Urban Birds"	24 January 2008
110	2	"Rural Birds"	31 January 2008
111	3	"Coastal Birds"	7 February 2008

=== Romans in Scotland (2008) ===
No. overall	No. in series	Title	Original release date
112	1	TBA	7 November 2008
113	2	TBA	14 November 2008
