= DynaMo =

British children's educational programme

- Title card with DynaMo (left) and SloMo (right)
- Genre: Educational
- Developed by: BBC
- Voices of: Michael Fenton-Stevens
- Composer: David Arnold
- Country of origin: United Kingdom
- Original language: English

Original release
- Network: BBC
- Release: 3 October 1998 – 24 September 2001

DynaMo was a British children's educational programme created in 1998. It was broadcast by the BBC on the BBC Learning Zone. The programme was hosted by the eponymous cartoon dog DynaMo with his friend SlowMo to teach children aged 5–9 about English, maths, science and history. The programme was broadcast on BBC television from 3 October 1998 to 24 September 2001.

== Programme ==
The concept came about from a BBC survey of 2,800 parents, teachers and children. The survey showed that parents were unwilling to assist children with homework due to not wanting to impose on them or risk upsetting teachers. DynaMo was created as a result. The programme designed for an eight week run on the BBC Learning Zone. It was created by the BBC to be a way for children to enjoy learning by involving cartoon characters and using educational clips from other BBC Education programmes. The programme was designed to follow the British National Curriculum. Hosted by the titular cartoon dog DynaMo and his friend SloMo, the two investigate a certain educational topic each episode. It was designed so that it could be watched by children alone or with their parents.

The programme whilst part of Learning Zone would be two hours long. Segments of the programme were also broadcast on the BBC Knowledge programme "K Club". During the winter and summer of 2001, segments of DynaMo would be broadcast on BBC Two during BBC Schools.

== Web content ==
DynaMo was also used as the face of the BBC's parental assistance website. This was created for parents to assist children with homework. There was also a section called "DynaMo's Den" which included educational games for children. The website was activated on 2 October 1998.
