= The National Archives (United Kingdom) =

Repository of archival records of the UK government

- Yr Archifau Cenedlaethol (Welsh)

Non-ministerial department overview
- Formed: April 2003
- Jurisdiction: England and Wales; Government of the United Kingdom
- Headquarters: Kew, Richmond; 51°28′52″N 0°16′46″W
- Employees: 626 (2025)
- Annual budget: ▲£46.2 million (2022–23)
- Ministers responsible: Lisa Nandy, Secretary of State for Culture, Media and Sport; Fiona Twycross, Baroness Twycross, Parliamentary Under Secretary of State
- Non-ministerial department executive: Saul Nassé, Chief Executive and Keeper of the Public Records
- Parent department: Department for Culture, Media and Sport
- Child agencies: Office of Public Sector Information; His Majesty's Stationery Office
- Key document: Archives for Everyone 2013-27
- Website: nationalarchives.gov.uk

- Applies to: Government of the United Kingdom; England and Wales
- Relates to: National archives

Other UK counterparts
- Northern Ireland: Public Record Office of Northern Ireland
- Scotland: National Records of Scotland

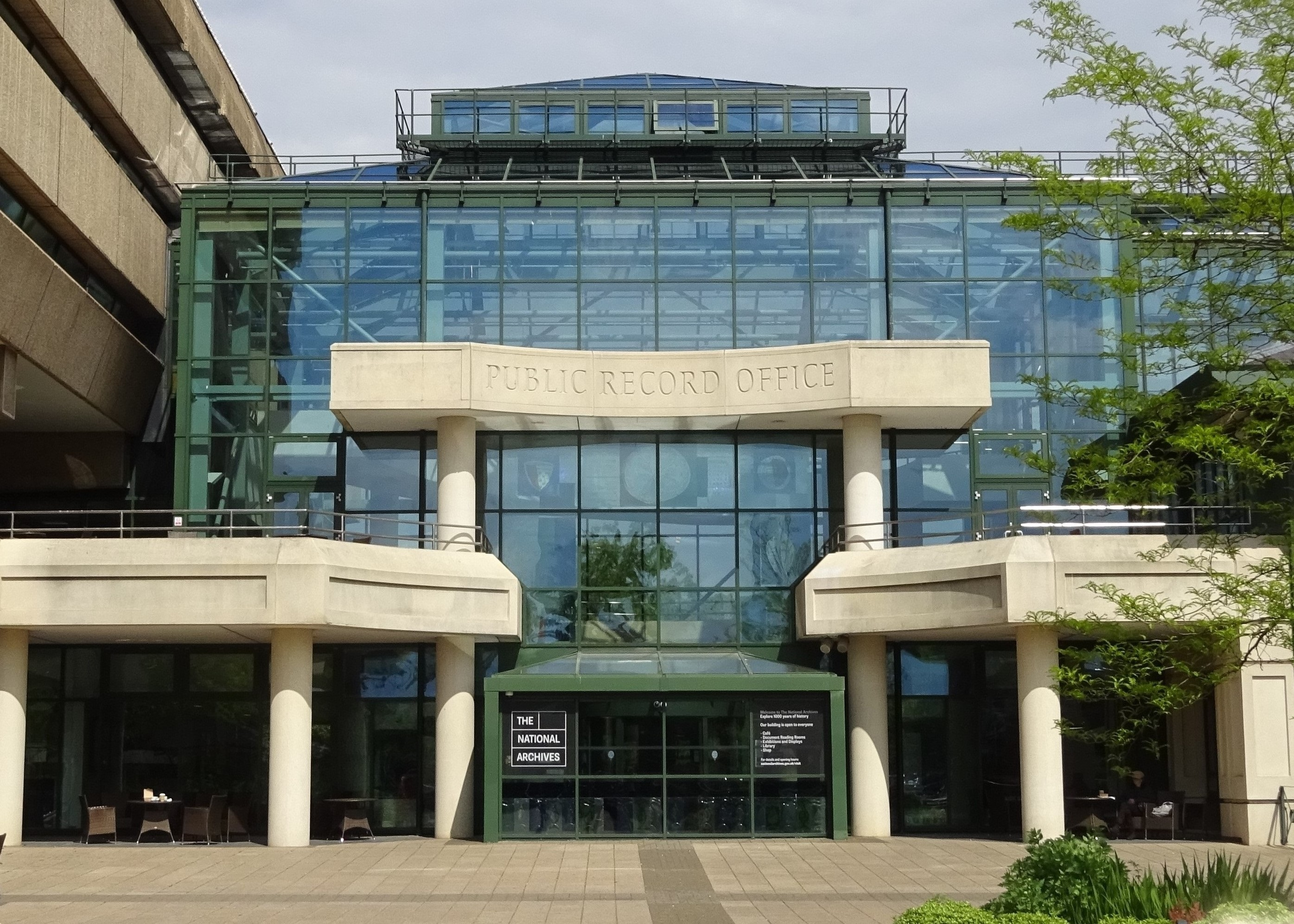
Main entrance to The National Archives building at Kew

The National Archives (TNA; Welsh: Yr Archifau Cenedlaethol) is the official national archive of the UK Government, and for England and Wales. The institution holds documents dating back over 1,000 years, and is open to the public and free to visit.

The National Archives is a non-ministerial department of the Government of the United Kingdom. Its parent department is the Department for Culture, Media and Sport of the United Kingdom of Great Britain and Northern Ireland. There are separate national archives at the National Records of Scotland and the Public Record Office of Northern Ireland.

The National Archives was formerly four separate organisations: the Public Record Office (PRO), the Historical Manuscripts Commission, the Office of Public Sector Information (OPSI) and His Majesty's Stationery Office (HMSO). The Public Record Office still exists as a legal entity, as the enabling legislation has not been modified, and documents held by the institution thus continue to be cited by some scholars as part of the PRO. Since 2008, TNA has also hosted the former UK Statute Law Database, now known as legislation.gov.uk, and since 2022 has hosted a case law database for decisions from superior courts of record since 2003, called "Find Case Law".

The institution is the responsibility of Fiona Twycross, Baroness Twycross, Parliamentary Under-Secretary of State for Museums, Heritage and Gambling, a minister in His Majesty's Government.

== Location ==
The National Archives is based in Kew in the London Borough of Richmond upon Thames in south-west London. TNA's original building designed by John Cecil Clavering was opened by Queen Elizabeth II in 1977 as an additional home for the public records, which were held at the Public Record Office building on Chancery Lane. The site was originally a World War I hospital, which was later used by several government departments. It is near to Kew Gardens Underground station.

Until its closure in March 2008, the Family Records Centre in Islington was run jointly by The National Archives and the General Register Office. TNA has an additional office in Norwich, which is primarily for former OPSI staff. There is a record storage facility (DeepStore) in the worked-out parts of Winsford Rock Salt Mine, Winsford, Cheshire.

== History ==
The National Archives was created in 2003 by combining the Public Record Office and the Historical Manuscripts Commission, and is a non-ministerial department reporting to the Minister of State for digital policy.

On 31 October 2006, The National Archives merged with the Office of Public Sector Information (OPSI), which itself incorporated the former Her Majesty's Stationery Office (HMSO), previously part of the Cabinet Office. The name remained The National Archives.

== Chief executive and keeper ==
- 1991–2005: Sarah Tyacke
- 2005–2010: Natalie Ceeney
- 2010–2013: Oliver Morley
- 2013–2014: Clem Brohier (acting)
- 2014–2024: Jeff James
- 2024–present: Saul Nassé

== Key roles ==
The National Archives claims it is "at the heart of information policy—setting standards and supporting innovation in information and records management across the UK, and providing a practical framework of best practice for opening up and encouraging the re-use of public sector information. This work helps inform today's decisions and ensure that they become tomorrow's permanent record." It has a number of key roles in information policy:

- Policy – advising government on information practice and policy, on issues from record creation through to its reuse
- Selection – selecting which documents to store
- Preservation – ensuring the documents remain in as good a condition as possible
- Access – providing the public with the opportunity to view the documents
- Advice – advising the public and other archives and archivists around the world on how to care for documents
- Intellectual property management – TNA (via OPSI and HMSO) manages crown copyright for the UK
- Regulation – ensuring that other public sector organisations adhere to both the public records act and the PSI reuse regulations.

== Sector leadership ==
The National Archives (and before, as the Public Record Office) has long had a role of oversight and leadership for the entire archives sector and archives profession in the UK, including local government and non-governmental archives. Under the Public Records Act 1958 it is responsible for overseeing the appropriate custody of certain non-governmental public records in England and Wales. Under the 2003 Historical Manuscripts Commission Warrant it has responsibility for investigating and reporting on non-governmental records and archives of all kinds throughout the United Kingdom. In October 2011, when the Museums, Libraries and Archives Council was wound up, TNA took over its responsibilities in respect of archives in England, including providing information and advice to ministers on archives policy. The National Archives now sees this part of its role as being "to enhance the 'archival health of the nation'".

== Collections ==
=== Types of records ===
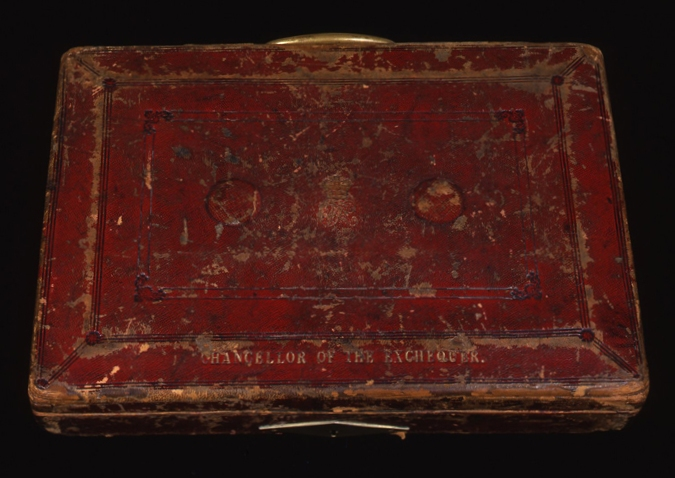
UK Prime Minister William Gladstone's 19th-century "red box", held in the archives

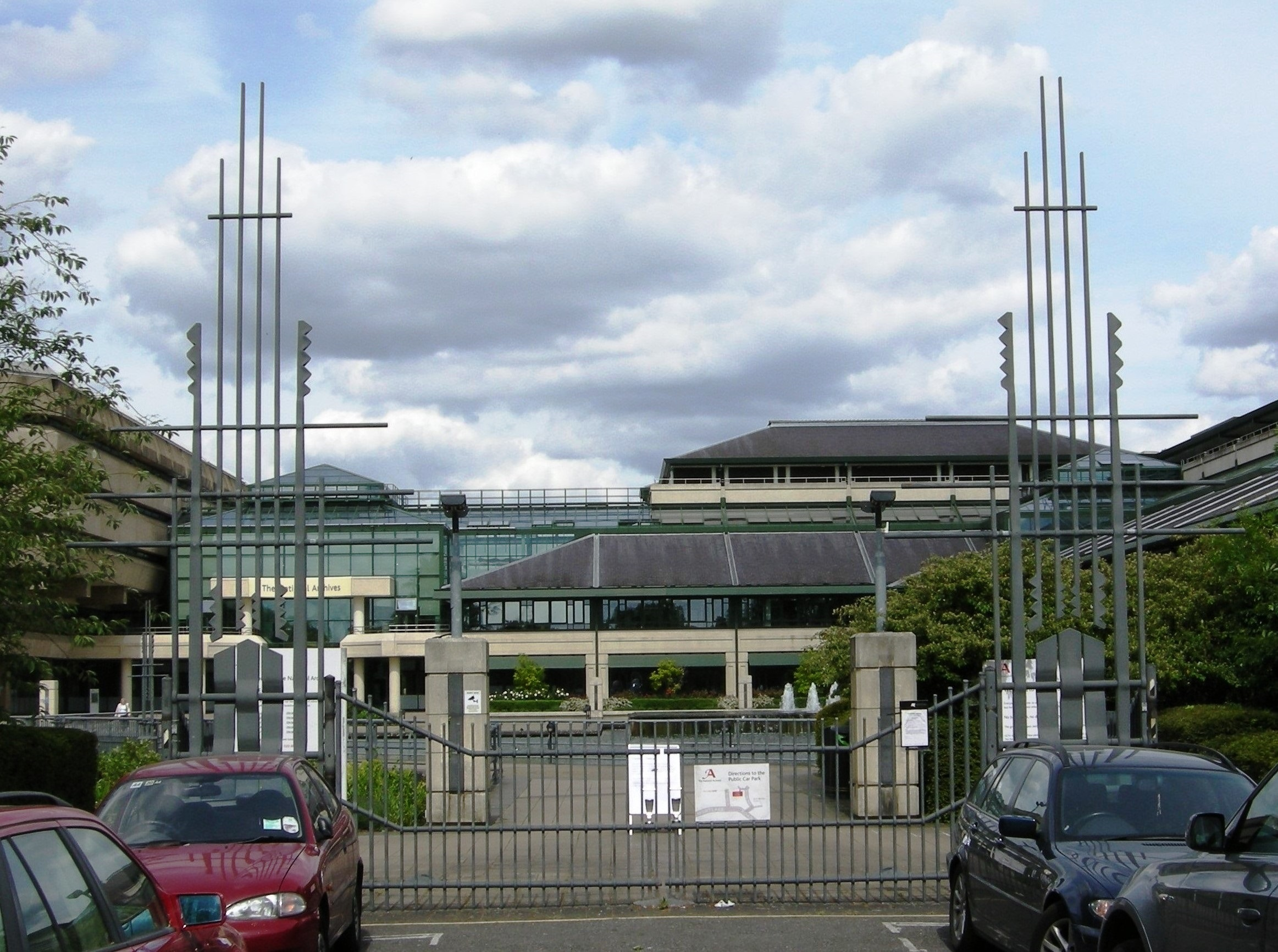
Entrance gates to The National Archives from Ruskin Avenue: the notched vertical elements were inspired by medieval tally sticks.

The National Archives is His Majesty's Government's official archive, "containing 1000 years of history from Domesday Book to the present", with records from parchment and paper scrolls through to digital files and archived websites. The material held at Kew includes the following:

- Documents from the central courts of law from the twelfth century onwards, including the Court of King's Bench, the Court of Common Pleas, the Court of Chancery, the Court of Exchequer, the Supreme Court of Judicature, the Central Criminal Court, Assizes, and many other courts
- Medieval, early modern and modern records of central government
- A large and disparate collection of maps, plans and architectural drawings
- Records for family historians including wills, naturalisation certificates and criminal records
- Service and operational records of the armed forces War Office, Admiralty etc.
- Foreign Office and Colonial Office correspondence and files
- Cabinet papers and Home Office records
- Statistics of the Board of Trade
- The surviving records of (mainly) the English railway companies, transferred from the British Railways Record Office

There is also a museum, which displays key documents such as Domesday Book and has exhibitions on various topics using material from the collections.

=== Highlights of the collection ===
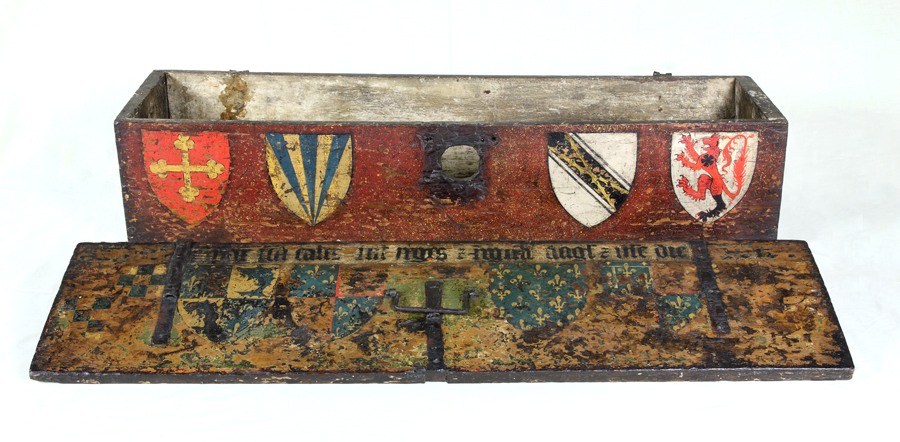
Treaty of Brétigny chest in the collection

- Domesday Book, unique record of medieval England (1086)
- Final version of Magna Carta, issued by King Henry III (1225)
- Chest box containing the Treaty of Brétigny, marking the end of the first phase of the Hundred Years' War between England and France (1360)
- Copy of the first item printed in England by William Caxton (1476)
- Gold seal of Francis I from the Treaty of Perpetual Peace between France and England (1527)
- Letter from Sir Francis Drake, Vice-Admiral of the English fleet, to Sir Francis Walsingham during the Spanish Armada (1588)
- Autographed confession of Guy Fawkes from the Gunpowder Plot (1605)
- The last will of William Shakespeare with the famous playwright's signature (1616)
- Manuscript record of Charles I's trial for treason, written by John Phelps (1649)
- Indictment letter for the notorious highwayman Dick Turpin (1739)
- Letter from Captain Cook to Philip Stephens, Secretary of the Admiralty prior to Cook's first voyage (1768)
- Olive Branch Petition from the Second Continental Congress to avert war between the Thirteen Colonies and Great Britain (1775)
- Three of 26 extant Dunlap Broadsides, the first printed record of the US Declaration of Independence (1776)
- One of 11 extant Exeter Broadsides, second printed record of the US Declaration of Independence (1776)
- Logbook of William Bligh from HMS Bounty with contemporaneous description of the infamous mutiny (1789)
- Last will of the famous author Jane Austen (1817)
- Copy of the Treaty of Nanjing (1842)
- Calling card left by the Marquis of Queensberry for Oscar Wilde that sparked his trial for sodomy (1895)
- SOS telegram from Jack Phillips alerting the nearby ship SS Birma to the sinking of the Titanic (1912)
- 1 out of about 30 printed copies of the Proclamation of the Irish Republic (1916)
- Copy of the Treaty of Versailles (1919)
- Signed letter of abdication by Edward VIII (1936)

=== Access to documents ===
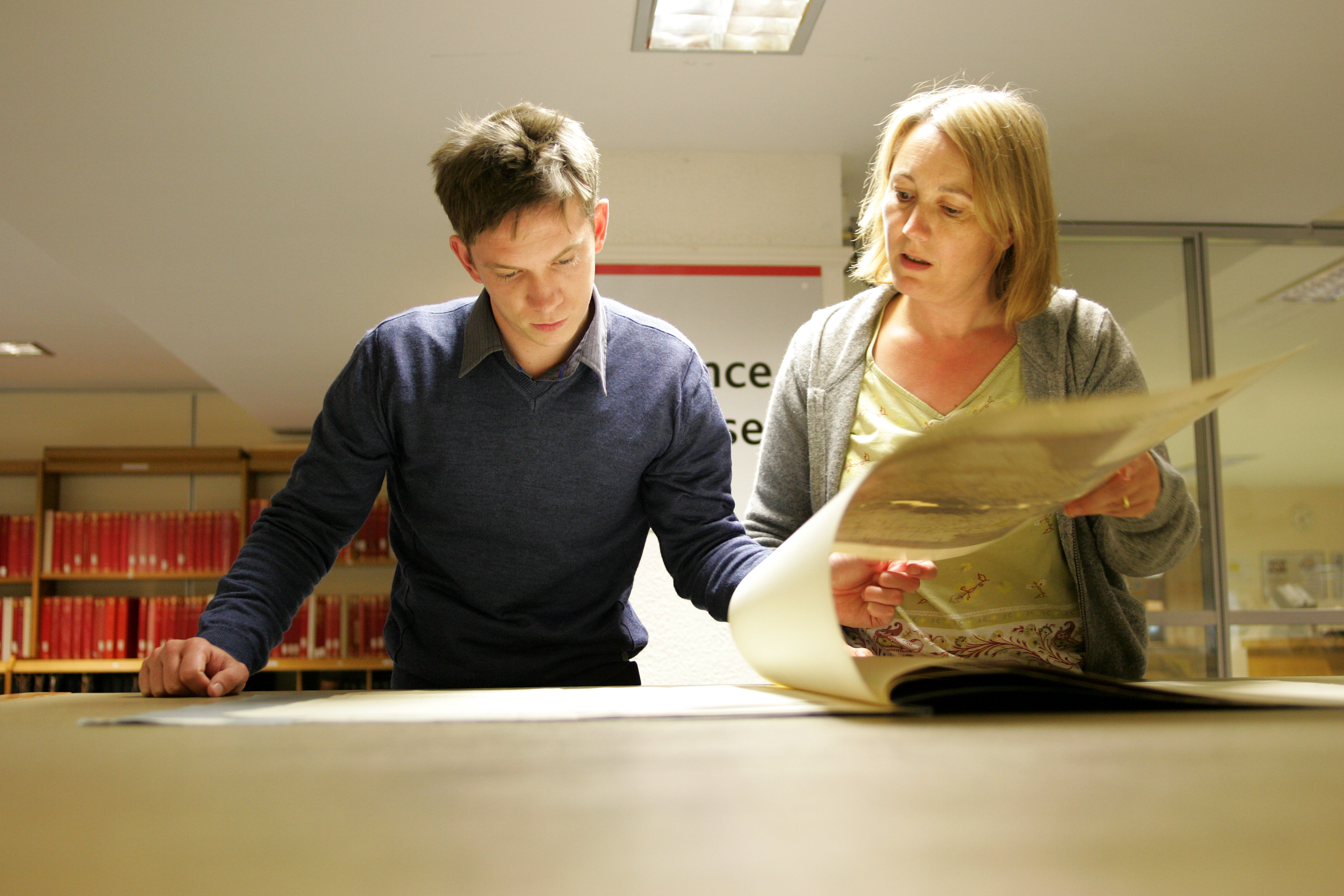
Researchers at the archive

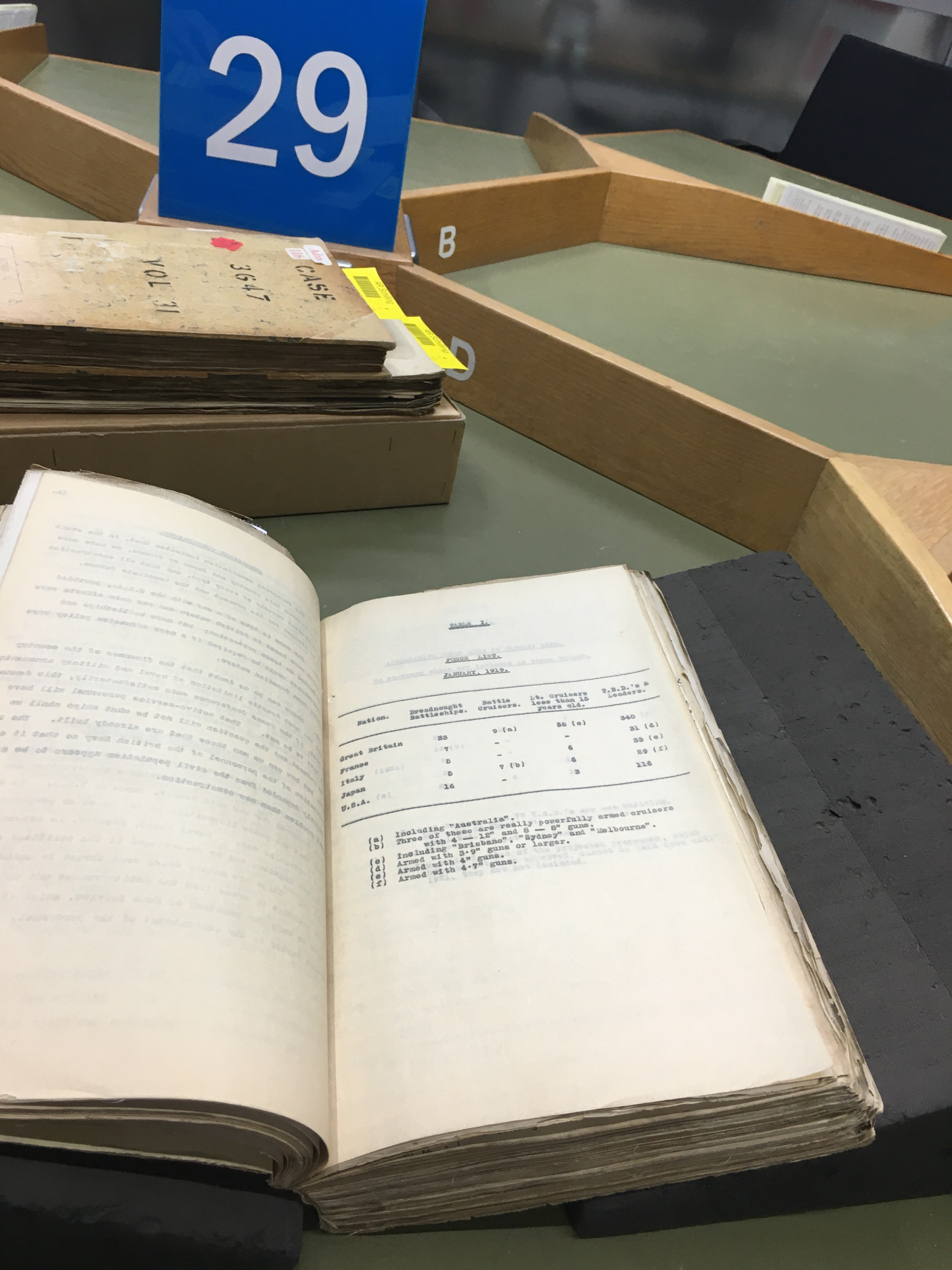
Researcher's point of view: Document open at assigned table, with foam supports to prevent binding from breaking

The collections held by The National Archives can be searched using Discovery, the name given to the online catalogue of the holdings of TNA.

Entrance to The National Archives is free. The Research and Enquiries Room on the first floor contains a large number of desktop computer terminals. In addition, it is possible to bring your own device and to access Wi-Fi. Close by are the shelves of the reference library. Elsewhere on the first floor and the second floor are the reading room and map room, for conventional and oversized documents respectively. Access to these reading rooms is restricted to those persons with reader tickets, and there are rules on what can be taken in.

Anybody aged 16 or over can access the original documents at the Kew site, after producing two acceptable proofs of identity and being issued a free reader's ticket. The reading rooms have terminals from which documents can be ordered up from secure storage areas by their reference number. The reference number is in three parts: the department code of up to four letters, such as WO for the War Office; a series or class number, for the "subcategory" or collection that the document comes from; and an individual document number. Documents can also be ordered several days in advance of a visit.

Once a same-day document order has been placed, The National Archives aims to get it to the reader within an hour (assuming it is kept at Kew rather than at their second repository, "DeepStore" – a former salt mine in Cheshire: it takes 3 working days for files to be retrieved from the latter). Special arrangements are in place for readers wishing to retrieve large groups of files as bulk orders placed in advance.

As of 2011, some of the most popular documents had been digitised and were available to download from Discovery, for a fee of £3.50 per file, or through co-branded services called 'licensed Internet associates' as pay-per-view or part of their subscription service. On 22 April 2020, it was announced that a monthly quota of free downloads from Discovery would be made available to registered users, instead of charging £3.50 per downloaded file. As at August 2023 there are three licensing agreements in place: Ancestry.com, Findmypast and TheGenealogist.

A reader's ticket is not needed to access digitised records. Whilst a visitor is on the premises, they can be accessed for free on a terminal, or via a Wi-Fi connection, where the paywall on the network has been disabled. Frequently accessed documents such as the Abdication Papers had originally been captured on microfilm, as were the aggregated service records for two million First World War soldiers. As part of a digitisation programme, microfilm was eliminated, and replaced by digital files, some of which were free to download.

Researchers are encouraged to check Discovery first, to see if they can get what they want online, via the portal or a third-party provider. If a document is available online, The National Archives' policy is to encourage people to use the digital copy (surrogate) and not the original, even if they come to Kew, in order to protect the original from damage. In extreme circumstances, such as where the black and white image of the original was on microfilm, was transferred to a digital file, and resultant image decay has rendered the finer points illegible, an original document can be retrieved.

It will be clearly stated in the catalogue entry if the record has not been digitised.

==== British Army "medal index cards", 1914 to 1919 ====
In 1985, the Army Medal Office photographed its WW1 medal index cards, the resultant images being stored as microform. This was transferred to The National Archives. From 2004 onwards, batches of the medal index cards were added to the catalogue, and it was possible to download an image file of the face of six medal index cards. The originals of these campaign medal cards were earmarked for destruction in 2005 by the Ministry of Defence, but were rescued by the Western Front Association.

In addition, there were microform images of the subset of cards pertaining to the award of the Military Medal. The originals of these were earmarked for destruction by the Ministry of Defence, but were rescued by the historian Howard Williamson in 1997.

==== British Army "burnt records", 1914 to 1919 ====
Over six million sets of these papers were stored in a War Office warehouse in London, along with a multitude of other record sets, but incendiary bombs dropped on the warehouse in the Second World War started a fire in which most were destroyed. The surviving quartile were largely water or fire-damaged and thus acquired the colloquial name of the "burnt documents". As they were mostly too fragile for public access, they were put on microfilm with the aid of the Heritage Lottery Fund. This activity commenced in 1996 and concluded in 2003. They were converted to digital image files and were made available on the Ancestry website from 2008 onwards. These are archive series WO 363.

==== British Army "unburnt records", 1914 to 1919 ====
Some service record papers were held elsewhere by the Ministry of Pensions, and were unaffected by the warehouse fire. These records were also microfilmed and then converted to digital files, and were made available on the Ancestry website from 2008 onwards. These are archive series WO 364.

==== British Army service records, 1920 to 1963 ====
For several years beforehand, the future transfer of the records was being talked about. In February 2021 the Ministry of Defence commenced transferring 9.7 million military records for individuals with a discharge date before 31 December 1963 to The National Archives, its largest record transfer in the history of the organization. The first batch of records were added to the Discovery catalogue in April 2022. Since then, these records can be physically consulted in the invigilation room. A minimum of four business days advance notice is required when ordering these records, which are held offsite. There has to be over 115 years since the birth of the individual, in order that the record can be viewed in person, and the records cannot be marked as "open" where this condition is not met.

In March 2023, Ancestry announced that it had won a contract to digitize over 3 million British Army service records, which it would release from 2024 through 2029.

News of the record transfer generated a lot of requests for copies of service records. There were long lead times, and the admin fee did not cover the true costs. In December 2025, a revised statement on the project website announced that, with effect from 2 February 2026, the Request A Military Service Record access service team offered two copying services. A standard copy of "core" documents would incur a set fee, whereas a full copy would incur a fee that increased incrementally, on a per-image basis. Their goal was to get the lead time of requests done in weeks, not years. The statement advised that 8.2 million records had been transferred, of which 2.6 million were indexed on the online catalogue, Discovery. All of the in-scope British Army service records for NCOs and ORs had been transferred. The officers' service records were still with the MoD.

==== Royal Air Force service records, 1920 to 1963 ====
The transfer of airmens' service records commenced in April 2025, and had been completed by 28 November 2025. The officers' service records were still with the MoD. In January 2026 the process started of indexing the airmens' records on the online catalogue, Discovery.

=== Storage ===
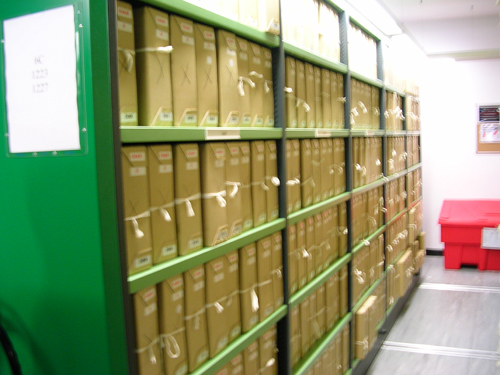
Moveable shelving in one of the more modern repositories

The documents are stored on mobile shelving – double-sided shelves, which are pushed together so that there is no aisle between them. A large handle on the end of each shelf allows them to be moved along tracks in the floor to create an aisle when needed.

They are generally stored in acid-free folders or boxes.

In the event of a fire The National Archives would be clearly unable to use sprinklers for fear of ruining its holdings, and so when the building is evacuated, argon gas is released into the air-tight repositories.

== Other services ==
The National Archives also provides services to help users in their research and also find collections beyond those it holds.

=== Education ===
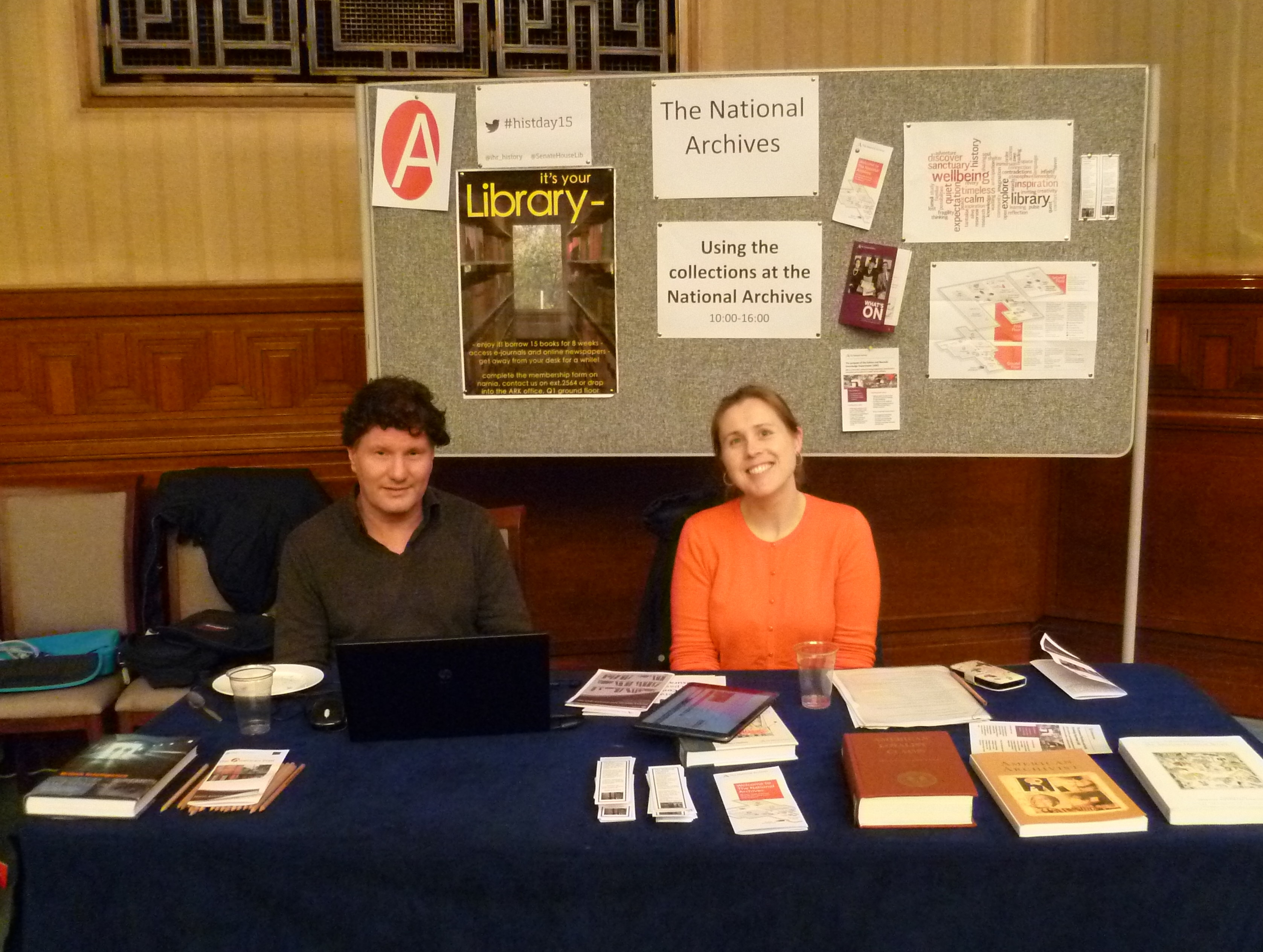
National Archives at the London University School of Advanced Studies History Day, November 2015

The National Archives' education web page is a free online resource for teaching and learning history, aimed at teachers and students. Users can select time periods they are interested in, from the medieval era to the present day. Each time period contains sub-topics with various materials that can be used as teaching tools for teachers. Resources for students focus primarily on tips for research and writing using archival materials.

=== "Access to Archives" ===
Access to Archives (also known as A2A) is a database containing details of archival collections held in many different archive repositories in England and Wales. As of March 2008, there are no more plans to add additional collections to A2A due to lack of funding from the Heritage Lottery Fund and the changing financial priorities of The National Archives, but existing entries can still be updated. The A2A database was transferred to The National Archives with a new platform with a simpler interface to ensure its availability.

=== National Register of Archives ===
The National Register of Archives (NRA) is the central point for the collection and circulation of information about the content and nature of archival manuscripts relating to British history. It contains published and unpublished lists and catalogues describing archival collections in the UK and overseas: currently over 44,000 such catalogues are included. The register can be consulted in the National Archives reading room and the index used to be searchable as an online database on the National Archives web site.

The information is collected in a variety of ways. The National Archives is sent hard-copy catalogues from archive repositories holding records relating to British history. These are kept in the reading room at The National Archives and indexed in the online database. The National Archives conducts an annual survey of archive repositories and records all new accessions, and the accession lists are also available on The National Archives' website. Information is also obtained from surveys and guides to archival collections, and other publications.

The Register includes name indexes to its contents (covering corporate names, personal names, family names, and place names); but not subject or thematic indexes. Where the catalogues are themselves available online the indexes provide direct electronic links; but many still exist in hard copy only (often as unpublished "grey literature"), and it remains necessary for the researcher to visit either The National Archives or the specific repository in order to consult them.

A separate National Register of Archives for Scotland is maintained at the National Archives of Scotland, but its contents are duplicated within the NRA at Kew.

=== ARCHON directory ===
ARCHON Directory is a database of contact details for archive repositories in the UK and institutions elsewhere in the world which have substantial collections of manuscripts relating to British history.

=== "Your Archives" ===
Your Archives was a wiki for the National Archives on-line community which was launched in May 2007; it was closed for editing on 30 September 2012 in preparation of archiving on the Government web archive. The contributions were made by users to give additional information to that which is available on the other services provided by the National Archives, including the catalogue, research guides, documentonline and National Register of Archive. Your Archives encouraged users to create articles not only about historical records held by the National Archives, but those held in other archive repositories.

Instead, since 2014, it has been possible for users of Discovery to add metadata tags to catalogue items. This has become the new means by which members of the user community can contribute via crowdsourcing.

=== Databases ===
The National Archives also hosts several databases on types of records including hospital records; migration records; and manorial records.

Working with the Wellcome Library, The National Archives has made hospital records available via the Hospital Records Database. The Hospital Records Database has not been updated since 2012, and there are no current updates occurring as of 2018.

The Manorial Documents Register includes records relating to manors located in England and Wales. Digitization of the records is on-going as of 2018.

=== Civil Pages ===
The National Archives operates the Civil Pages project on behalf of the Cabinet Office, operating as an online directory for the civil service, facilitating working together and providing a means of sharing knowledge securely between government departments.

=== Smartphone applications ===
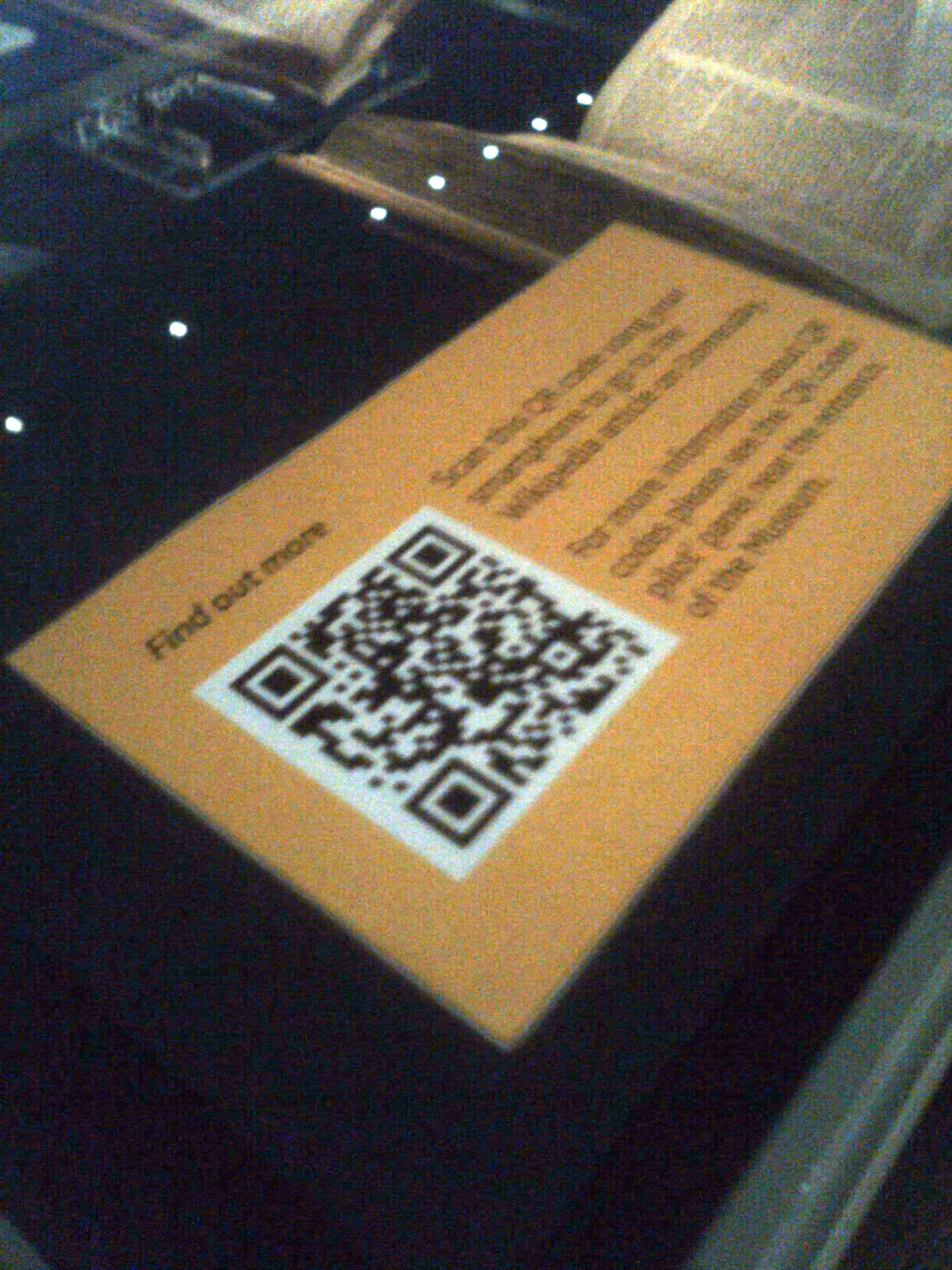
QRpedia codes at the archives

In January 2011 The National Archives, in conjunction with historian Nick Barratt and smartphone applications development studio RevelMob, developed its first Old Money iPhone app, which uses historic price data from documents held at The National Archives to see what a sum of money from the past (from 1270) would be worth today and the spending power it would have commanded at the time.

In September 2011, The National Archives' museum began using QRpedia codes, which can be scanned by smartphone users in order to retrieve information about exhibits from Wikipedia.

=== Blogs and podcasts ===
The National Archives regularly posts blogs to its website. Posts cover a wide range of topics, from specific events and time periods to features on holdings in The National Archives, as well as information on the archive's operations.

The "Archives Media Player" section holds videos and podcasts created and posted by The National Archives. Videos and audio are not posted as regularly as The National Archives' blog.

=== Strategic plans for the future ===
==== Archives Inspire 2015–19 ====
Archives Inspire was a strategy document that set out the goals and priorities of the organisation over four years, from 2015 onwards.

== Lost and misplaced records ==
Between 2005 and 2011, over 1,500 files had been reported missing from the archives. Notable items reported missing during this period included correspondence from Winston Churchill and documents from the courts of several monarchies. Around 800 of these records have since been recovered, and the archives has reported that they believe most are misplaced rather than permanently lost. In 2017, the archives again received attention when it was reported that around 1000 files had been removed – in part or whole – by government officials and reported as missing when not returned. In response to concerns stated by politicians and historians about management of the collection, the archives stressed that the number of missing files is quite small in proportion to the entire holdings of the repository – about 0.01% – and that, as of 2017, its loss rate was only around 100 documents, annually.

=== Forgeries discovered in 2005 ===
In June 2005, journalist Ben Fenton of The Daily Telegraph received an email from a colleague asking him to investigate documents held at The National Archives that alleged that a British intelligence agent had, on the orders of Winston Churchill, murdered Heinrich Himmler, the head of the Nazi SS, in 1945. The three documents had come to prominence after being revealed by author Martin Allen in his book Himmler's Secret War.

On viewing photographs of the documents, Fenton's suspicions were immediately aroused by the fact that such a controversial policy was casually committed to paper, even to the extent of naming the assassin, and by the use of colourful language. Viewing the original documents the next day, Fenton spotted what looked like pencil marks beneath the signature on one of them. This confirmed his suspicions and, along with his experience of analysing historic documents, it enabled him to persuade The Daily Telegraph to pay for forensic analysis.

The National Archives staff took four files, along with authenticated copies of the authors' handwriting, to Audrey Giles, a former head of Scotland Yard's Questioned Documents Unit, who confirmed that the documents were forgeries. One letter head had been printed on a laser printer and all had tear marks where they had been threaded on to the security tags. Further investigations by National Archives staff revealed that the counterfeit documents contained errors, breaches of protocol and etiquette which their supposed authors would not have committed.

After his account of the deception appeared in the newspaper, Fenton was contacted by a German academic, Ernst Haiger, who informed him of his own suspicions over other National Archives documents cited in an earlier Allen book. Examination by The National Archives experts led to more than a dozen documents being identified as suspicious and submitted to Home Office specialists for examination. When they, too, were declared forgeries, TNA called in the police.

In the addendum to the later American edition of the book (which acknowledged that the papers were forged), Allen theorised that, some time after he saw the documents, they had been removed and replaced with clumsily forged replicas, to cast doubt upon his discoveries.

In all, twenty-nine forged documents were discovered, each typed on one of only four typewriters. They were placed in twelve separate files, and cited at least once in one or more of Allen's three books. According to the experts at The National Archives, documents now shown to be forgeries supported controversial arguments central to each of Allen's books: in Hidden Agenda, five documents now known to be forged helped justify his claim that the Duke of Windsor betrayed military secrets to Hitler; in The Hitler/Hess Deception, thirteen forged papers supported Allen's contention that, in 1941, British intelligence used members of the Royal family to fool the Nazis into thinking Britain was on the verge of a pro-German putsch; in Himmler's Secret War, twenty-two counterfeit papers also underpinned the book's core claims that British intelligence played mind games with Himmler to encourage him to betray Hitler from 1943 onwards, and that ultimately they murdered the SS chief.

In 2007 the Crown Prosecution Service announced that it was "not in the public interest" to prosecute the only suspect questioned by police. Allen's health problems had prevented the police questioning him for nine months, after which he told them he was wholly innocent. In a December 2007 response to questions from Norman Baker MP, the Solicitor-General said that the police investigation, guided by the opinion of a senior barrister, had produced "sufficient evidence for a realistic prospect of conviction" on charges of forgery, using a forged document and criminal damage but it had been decided that it was not in the public interest to proceed. In reaching that decision, "matters relating to Mr Allen's health and the surrounding circumstances were significant in deciding that a prosecution was not in the public interest".

a well-planned attempt to corrupt the UK's primary source of historical information

— Detective Inspector Andy Perrott, Financial Times, 3 May 2008

It is hard to imagine actions more damaging to the cause of preserving the nation's heritage, than wilfully forging documents designed to alter our historical record.

— Historian Sir Max Hastings, Financial Times, 3 May 2008

== MI5 records at TNA ==
The National Archives receives records from MI5 around twice a year. Some information in records, or records themselves, are withheld at the discretion of MI5.

=== MI5 records in the news ===
MI5 records relating to British Prime Minister Margaret Thatcher's time in office have caused some questions and controversy regarding the transparency of the British government. In 2017, journalist Richard Norton-Taylor argued that MI5, and the British government by extension, was purposely withholding some information that the public deserves to know. Norton-Taylor specifically refers to Thatcher's reluctance to allow the publication of two books looking into the impact that intelligence organizations of Britain had on World War II, as well as her worries about British activities in Northern Ireland becoming known to the general public.

Additional MI5 records relating to the blacklisting of government workers during Thatcher's time in office have also prompted questions after their release. In addition to government workers, the blacklists also targeted other groups, such as unions and minorities, that may not fall in line with Conservative policies. Debates on the roles of MI5, Whitehall, and Thatcher's administration, have come up in light of these records at The National Archives and prompted questions of transparency as well as whether or not these blacklists had an effect on the careers of any individuals included. Questions also remain, as of 2018, whether or not there are still blacklists currently in effect and if these could affect government workers, unions, and other individuals possibly included in the blacklists.

== See also ==
- UK Government Web Archive
- International Standard Bibliographic Description
- List and Index Society
- List of national archives
- PRONOM technical registry
