= Park View School, Chester-le-Street =

Park View School
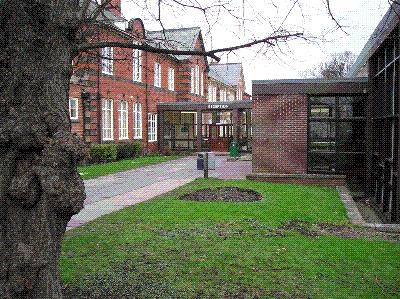
- Entrance to the main building

Location
- Church Chare; Chester-le-Street, County Durham, DH3 3QA; England; 54°51′18″N 1°34′12″W

Information
- Type: Academy
- Motto: Behave with honesty, treat people with sincerity
- Established: 2011
- Department for Education URN: 136971 Tables
- Ofsted: Reports
- Chair: William Dennison
- Headmaster: Andrew Finley
- Age: 11 to 18
- Enrolment: 1519
- Colours: Black and Gold
- Publication: Park Views
- Website: http://www.parkviewlearning.net

Park View School is an academy and sixth form in Chester-le-Street, County Durham for students aged 11 to 18. Year 7 and 8 students spend the first two years at the North Lodge site two miles to the north of the Church Chare site. During 2012 to 2013, it underwent a £1 million refurbishment.

== History ==
Chester-le-Street Secondary School opened in September 1911. The school changed names to Chester-le-Street Grammar School in 1944, the Deanery in 1969, Park View Comprehensive in 1976, then finally Park View Community School in 1982. In July 2011, it became an academy shortening its name to Park View School.

== Ofsted and academic achievement ==
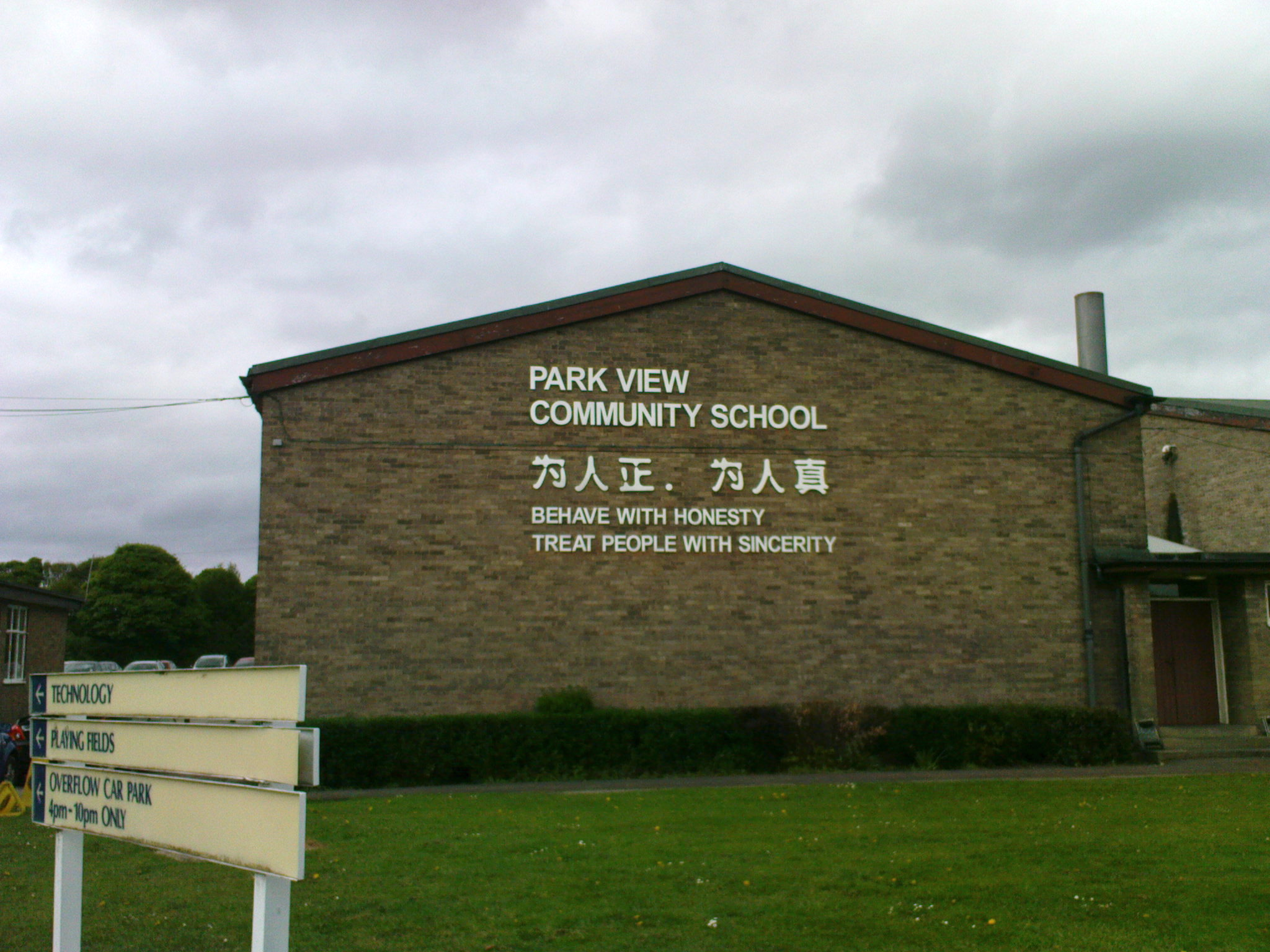
The North Lodge

In 1997 Park View Community School was designated as a Language College, and in 2008, it was awarded High Performing Specialist School Status and adopted an additional specialism in Applied Learning. It has also been awarded Beacon Status, the International School Award, the Language for Export Award, the Artsmark Award, the Sportsmark and Activemark Awards 2006, the Leading Edge School Award. The school generally gets good results, with the best GCSE and A-level results in County Durham. The 2004 Ofsted inspection rated Park View "very good" in every category. Since the 2008 inspection the school has been consistently rated "good".

== Extracurricular activities ==
In 2007, Park View took part in the NGS River Monitoring Project. In 2009, the school had its first student attain a place on the Prime Minister's Global Fellowship programme, the Global Fellowship programme ceased at the end of March 2011. From 2011, the school has participated in the Comenius Bilateral School Partnerships programme.

== Notable alumni ==
=== Chester-le-Street Grammar School ===
- Alan Clark (keyboardist), keyboardist for Dire Straits
- Prof Anne Curry FRHistS, Professor of Medieval History since 2004 at the University of Southampton
- Terry Garbett, footballer for Watford & New York Cosmos.
- Prof Jack Heslop-Harrison, President from 1974 to 1975 of the Institute of Biology
- June Markham, ice dancer with Courtney Jones, won the World Championships in 1957 and 1958
- Edwin Solomon CBE, Chief Constable from 1967 to 1974 of West Midlands Constabulary
- John Taylor CBE, Chief executive from 2001 of Acas

=== Park View Comprehensive ===
- Jeff James, CEO of The National Archives

=== Park View Community School ===
- Will Fletcher, Olympic rower
- Darren Holden (footballer), footballer for Consett A.F.C
- Steve Howard, footballer for Leicester City F.C.
- Grant Leadbitter, footballer for Sunderland A.F.C.
- Ross Pearson UFC fighter
- Adam Reach, footballer for Sheffield Wednesday F.C.
- Jonny Maddison, footballer for Port Vale F.C.
