= Mary Somerville (broadcasting executive) =

BBC broadcasting director

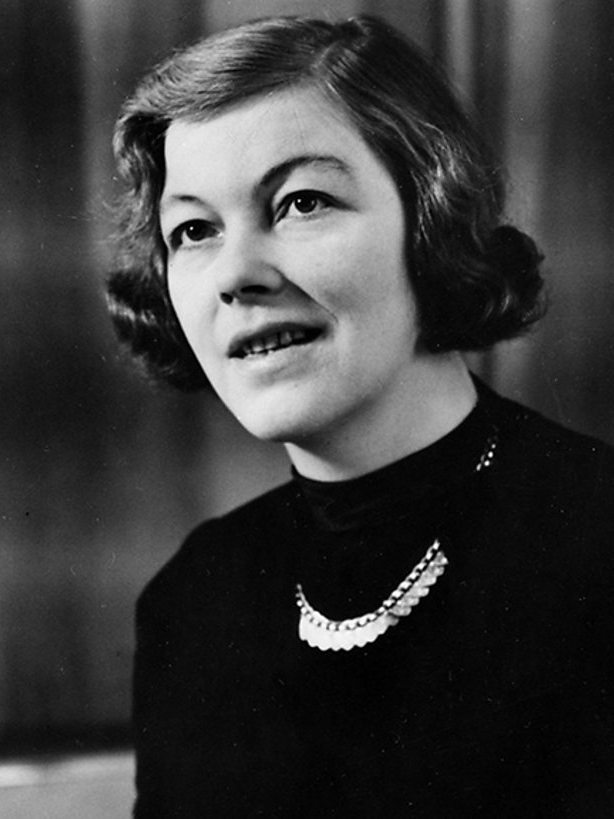
- Born: 1 November 1897; New Zealand
- Died: 1 September 1963 (aged 65)
- Alma mater: Somerville College
- Occupation: Pedagogue, broadcasting executive
- Employer: BBC (1925–1955)
- Awards: Officer of the Order of the British Empire

Mary Somerville, OBE (1 November 1897 – 1 September 1963) was the first Director of Schools Broadcasting at the BBC (1925–1949). She pioneered their school broadcasting program in the 1930s and 1940s, and later served as controller of the BBC Talks division.

== Early life ==
Mary Somerville was born in New Zealand on 1 November 1897, as the eldest daughter of the Reverend James Alexander Somerville and his wife Agnes Fleming. She was raised in Scotland, and attended Somerville College, where she completed an English degree. While at school, she met and impressed John Reith; already convinced of the potential for radio in education, she offered to work unpaid for the BBC. Reith advised her to stay at Oxford and "take a degree" before joining the BBC. On Reith's recommendation, she was hired in 1925, and began working for the BBC's Education Department under J. C. Stobart.

== BBC career ==
In 1929, Somerville was named Director of School Broadcasting, a position which she held until 1947. She believed firmly in the value of radio programming to enrich children's educational experiences, which she considered overly rigid at the time; under her tenure, school radio programs began to use dramatizations and sound effects to enliven their lessons. Somerville worked hard to ensure that BBC school broadcasting was held to high academic standards and was seen as a legitimate enterprise, fighting against skeptics who considered radio to be good for entertainment only.

In 1947, Somerville was appointed assistant controller to the Talks division. On 1 July 1950, she became controller of the division, a position she held until her retirement from the BBC in December 1955. She was the first woman controller of a BBC division.

== Personal life ==
Somerville was married to journalist Ralph Penton Brown from 3 July 1928 to 1945, when the marriage was dissolved. She had one son with John Freeman. She was allowed to maintain her position at BBC after her marriage as the BBC's marriage bar, enacted in 1933, allowed women of exceptional value to remain with the Corporation. The marriage bar stated that "the retention of women after marriage is to be regarded as the exception," and Somerville was deemed to have the exceptional qualities required. On 20 July 1962, she married Eric Rowan Davies, a BBC producer.

She was diabetic, and "used to alarm [BBC producer Leonie] Cohn by casually yanking up her skirts during Talks meetings and injecting herself with insulin."

In 1935, she was appointed an Officer of the Order of the British Empire (OBE) in recognition of her efforts. She received an honorary MA degree from the University of Manchester in 1943.

She died at her home in Bath on 1 September 1963. Obituaries were published in The Times (written by Reith) and The New York Times. A forty-minute commemorative programme was broadcast by the BBC Home Service on 31 May 1964.
