= BBC Schools =

British educational television programming block

- Network: BBC One (1957–1983); BBC Two (1983–2010)
- Launched: 24 September 1957; 68 years ago
- Closed: 26 March 2010; 16 years ago
- Division of: BBC Learning
- Country of origin: United Kingdom
- Owner: BBC
- Formerly known as: BBC for Schools and Colleges; Daytime on Two; School Programmes
- Format: Educational programming
- Running time: Variable
- Original language: English

BBC Schools, also known as BBC for Schools and Colleges or BBC Education, was the educational programming strand set up by the BBC in 1957, broadcasting a range of educational programmes for children aged 5–16. From its launch until June 1983, programming was primarily based on BBC1 during the daytime, apart from during coverage of major news events which saw the programmes shifted to BBC2. In September 1983, programming was transferred permanently to BBC2 freeing BBC1 to develop its own daytime schedule. The strand, named Daytime on Two, remained on BBC Two until March 2010; it was later supplemented by the 'Class TV' strand on CBBC.

== Origins ==
The BBC began broadcasting schools programmes on television on 24 September 1957, airing in the afternoon. Morning transmissions began on 19 September 1960.

Until 1972, schools programming along with adult education programmes were usually the only daytime programmes shown on both BBC and ITV, as the government regulated and restricted the number of broadcasting hours for each channel. From the mid 1960s onwards a typical weekday on the BBC and ITV was limited to just seven hours of normal programming during the day. Schools programmes were exempt from those restrictions, so the BBC and to a lesser degree ITV used the programming for schools to fill their daytime schedules.

The restrictions were eased during 1971 and on 19 January 1972 the restrictions on broadcasting hours were lifted fully. ITV decided to move their schools programming to a new 2.5 hour block, airing from 9.30am-12 midday each weekday, followed by their normal full daytime schedules after midday.

== Presentation ==
=== The Pie Chart ===
From September 1960 until October 1973, the presentation was a black and white card with a pie chart split into five segments with a BBC logo in the bottom right corner. The pie chart segments disappeared with the seconds and were operated via a mechanical model. They were introduced, in 1969, by a special version of the BBC1 mirror globe, but without the 'Colour' legend, as the majority of schools programmes were still in black and white while the rest of BBC1's programmes were in colour.

=== The Diamond ===
In October 1973, the presentation was changed to a blue diamond on a black background with the BBC1 legend. It was commissioned to mark the start of schools programmes in colour, and consisted of the three diamonds of increasing size inside one another, first forming out of the background before pulsating and splitting into smaller diamonds, before eventually decreasing altogether. The colour scheme was changed in April 1975 following BBC1's rebrand of image to orange on a navy blue background with, unusually, an orange legend. This was accompanied by an orange version of the BBC1 network clock. A still version of the diamond was occasionally used on the channel, with a double lined version of the BBC1 logo. This was accompanied by a similar version for BBC2 with double lined BBC2 logo, for occasions when schools programmes were transferred to that channel.

=== The Dots ===
In September 1977, presentation was again changed to a countdown clock of disappearing dots around a spinning 'Schools and Colleges' legend. A white BBC1 legend was underneath, with the altered network clock discontinued. The spinning Schools and Colleges legend was in fact unintended and was a result of an issue with the mechanical model used. This was amended by the following summer.

In autumn 1981, the new corporate double lined BBC1 logo was added to the model in replacement of the old one, however this amended model only lasted three months, as the mechanical model was replaced by a computer generated version. The primary difference was that the dots, instead of fading to the background colour of blue, faded to black.

Upon occasions when the schools strand was transferred to BBC2, a version with the double lined 2 logo was used replacing the BBC1 legend. Following the switch to electronic, the BBC2 version was also recreated, however during the Falklands War, a version with a hastily added BBC2 ident was used, with the replaced caption being the orange logo on a black background box.

At around this time, special holding captions with the phrase 'Follows Shortly' were beginning to be used for junctions longer than the 60 seconds that the ident required. During a junction, the follows shortly caption would be shown over music before the screen faded into the ident. Library music was mostly used but chart music was used on occasions including Night Fever, Summer Nights, (Remember the Days of the) Old Schoolyard, and I'm A Believer.

=== Daytime on 2 ===
In September 1983, Schools programmes were moved from BBC1 to BBC2. This gave BBC1 the space to broadcast a daytime schedule although it was another three years until BBC1 launched a full daytime service. A special strand was set up on BBC2: Daytime on 2 as programmes were broadcast all day (from just after 9 am until 3 pm during the autumn and spring terms – fewer programmes were shown during the summer term) as opposed to just during the morning and early afternoon as had been the case on BBC1. The lunchtime period was occupied by adult education programmes which had previously been broadcast on BBC2 on Mondays and Tuesdays. The adult education programmes were only broadcast during the autumn and spring terms so Pages from Ceefax and sometimes Open University programmes were shown at lunchtimes during the summer term. A special version of the striped 2 ident was created, featuring an orange background instead of the usual black. Clocks were not used alongside the look but the 'Follows Shortly' captions were retained.

For the first two years of Daytime on Two, special Ceefax pages were broadcast during the longer intervals. The pages, branded as The Daytime on 2 Information Service, featured schedules and information about Daytime on 2 output. The pages were discontinued at the end of the 1984/85 school year.

In March 1986, BBC2 rebranded to the white embossed TWO on a white background. From here on, no special ident was used to introduce Daytime on Two programmes, instead using the normal ident as by now the special Daytime on 2 Ceefax pages had been discontinued. All gaps of less than fifteen minutes were now filled using the newly designed 'Follows Shortly' captions over music, before cutting to the ident and announcement. A later addition was that of a 15-second countdown timer, displaying the seconds in a box, usually located in the top right corner of the screen. However, there are examples of the location being changed depending on the programme caption that preceded the ident.

Following the rebrand of TWO to BBC2, including the introduction of the '2' idents, no special presentation was used to mark schools programmes. The 'Follows Shortly' captions were phased out in place of promotions of other appropriate programmes, through static programme captions and fillers that may be considered similar to the intervals on the BBC Television Service in the 50s and 60s.

Daytime on Two continued to air until June 1997 and when daytime programmes for schools returned that autumn, they were merely branded under the title of School Programmes with broadcasts now mostly limited to the morning.

== Move to overnight broadcasts ==
Between 19 January 1993 and 5 October 1995, some programmes were shown (as subject blocks or a series block) overnight as part of a new experiment called Nightschool. This moved to the overnight service The Learning Zone in October 1995, which later rebranded as BBC Learning Zone in October 1997.

On 9 October 1995, the launch of the BBC Learning Zone saw some programming, generally the secondary education programming, was transferred to the new overnight service, as more schools were recording the programmes to show rather than showing the programmes live. Secondary school programming continued to air during 'Daytime on Two' until Autumn 1999, when it made its permanent move to BBC Learning Zone.

It was announced in 2009 that all schools programming would be moved to the BBC Learning Zone with the final daytime schools programme on BBC Two shown on 26 March 2010 – a repeat of the Look and Read series Captain Crimson (which was also the final episode of the series).

All schools programmes were then shown overnight on the BBC Learning Zone, until the strand ended on 24 July 2015 due to budget cuts. This meant that BBC Schools output was now online only.

== Class TV ==
When the CBBC Channel launched in February 2002, their remit resulted in their need to show schools programming. This resulted in the Class TV strand, shown during schools hours for a few hours (usually repeats of previous programmes, rather than new ones). In March 2008, the CBBC remit was altered to remove the schools element from the channel, with the final strand airing on 20 March.

== List of programmes broadcast ==
- Cats' Eyes, a primary school science programme set in Moggy Mews.
- Come Outside, a programme teaching Science, History and English.
- DynaMo, a show involving English, maths, history and science featuring the characters DynaMo and Slo-Mo.
- English Express, an English programme covering English for primary school pupils.
- The Experimenter, a primary school science programme featuring the characters XP and Sarah.
- Ghostwriter
- Hotch Potch House, a preschool programme set at Hotch Potch House involving letters, numbers, activities, songs and rhymes and going out and about featuring the characters Woolie, Raggs, Shelley and Nana who tells the Mouse House stories.
- Landmarks, a history/geography programme.
- Le Club, a French-language programme presented by Toby Anstis and the children of Boulogne-sur-Mer and featuring the animated character Globo the alien.
- Look and Read, a programme teaching English through stories and word structure.
- Look, Look and Look Again, an arts programme.
- The Magic Key, a series involving helpful hints and learning adventures. Based on characters from the Oxford Reading Tree books by Roderick Hunt and Alex Brychta.
- Maths Challenge TV Workout
- The Maths Channel, a series involving math sketches based around different TV programmes. One including a ChuckleVision spoof called ChuckleMaths starring the Chuckle Brothers.
- Megamaths, a maths programme set in Table Mountain exploring multiplication, money, division, and measuring.
- Music Makers, a music programme offering a stimulating mixture of animation, documentary and graphics to illustrate basic techniques for composing.
- Music Time, a primary-school look at music.
- Number Adventures, a maths programme featuring the characters Didi and her rag doll Spike.
- Numbertime, a long running series involving numbers, shapes, side by side, more or less, time, money, and addition and subtraction, along with adventures with El Nombre.
- Razzledazzle
- Scene, a programme for teenagers, aimed at topical issues.
- Science Clips, a series featuring clips from various science topics.
- Science Topics
- See You, See Me
- Starship, a series involving maths and English featuring the characters Star, Sky and Hutch.
- Storytime, a series telling stories with children.
- Walrus, a long-running infant / junior-school series teaching English articulation, communication, writing, spelling, and grammar (the titular acronym stood for "writing and listening, reading, understanding, speaking").
- Watch, a long-running infant miscellany series including some programmes such as Magic Grandad and Barnaby Bear.
- What? Where? When? Why?, a show for children aged 5 to 9, starring The Happy Gang.
- Words and Pictures, a long running series about letters and writing with Magic Pencil.
- Writing and Pictures
- You and Me
- Zig Zag, a long-running junior-school age topical series covering history and science related subjects.

== See also ==
- Timeline of schools broadcasts in the UK
- ITV Schools, the commercial counterpart to the BBC
- BBC Learning Zone
- The Open University
- BBC School Radio
- BBC Learning
- Look Around You satire in Series 1 of BBC Schools and ITV Schools
