= Dars (TV show) =

Afghan educational programme

Dars (Dari and Pashto: درس, lit. 'Lesson') is an educational programme by the BBC launched in April 2023.

== Background ==
Broadcasting episodes in Dari and Pashto, the national languages of Afghanistan, the programme is aimed at children aged between 11 and 16, including girls whose secondary education has been stopped by the Taliban government. The weekly programme is broadcast on BBC News Afghanistan, as well as on social media streams of BBC News Pashto and BBC News Dari.

Following the Taliban takeover, schools for girls were closed. The Taliban stated that the closures were "temporary" until a "suitable environment" was created. The Taliban has said delays to reopening the schools have been caused by the country's aid payments being frozen.

Dars is hosted by female journalists from the BBC's Dari and Pashto services who were evacuated from Afghanistan during the 2021 Taliban takeover. It is filmed in London, United Kingdom.

Dars uses existing BBC's existing educational content, most notably BBC Bitesize, a free online resource for pupils in the United Kingdom, in subjects including maths, science, history, and IT. The videos' adaptations including adding Dari- or Pashto-speaking presenters and removing references that would not make sense in an Afghan context. The episodes are aimed at children aged 11 to 16 who are not accessing education.

Dars airs weekly for half-hour episodes which are broadcast four times a day, Monday to Saturday, on BBC News Afghanistan, as well as being posted online. The first episode premiered on 1 April 2023.

In October 2023, Dars launched its second series, scheduled to run the end of the Afghan academic year in December 2023.

The United Nations called Dars "a learning lifeline" for children barred from schools in Afghanistan.

The program won a Gracie Award in 2024. Fiona Crack of the BBC said it was essential that the program returned for a fourth series.

== Producers ==
- Mariam Aman
- Georgina Pearce

== Presenters ==
Dari version:

- Aalia Farzan
- Sahar Rahimi

Pashto version:

- Shazia Haya
- Malaika Ahmedzai
