= BBC Learning Zone =

Educational overnight television on BBC Two

- Network: BBC Two
- Launched: 9 October 1995; 31 years ago
- Closed: 24 July 2015; 11 years ago
- Country of origin: United Kingdom
- Owner: BBC
- Formerly known as: The Learning Zone
- Format: Late night educational programming
- Original language: English
- Official website: Official website

The BBC Learning Zone (previously The Learning Zone) was an educational strand run by the BBC as an overnight service on BBC Two. It broadcast programming aimed at students in Primary, Secondary and Higher Education as well as to adult learners. Viewers were encouraged to watch programmes after the original broadcast via the use of, originally VHS, then later DVD and PVR. In 2015, the BBC confirmed that due to budget cuts, the service would no longer be running.

== History ==
The BBC Learning Zone was launched as The Learning Zone on 9 October 1995, as an extension service of BBC2, to free up more of their schedule. Previously, these educational programmes had been based on the channel in mornings and often until the early afternoon on weekdays. However, following the channel's rebranding to the "2" idents and the increased viewer perception that resulted from it, the channel was anxious to use more of their daytime for different programming. The Learning Zone was the solution to this problem.

The idea had been around for a while: by 1995, ITV was operating as a 24-hour channel, freeing up their prime time and daytime schedules. The BBC attempted producing specialist television overnight by launching BBC Select. This service played out encrypted programming for professions such as medicine and law overnight between 1992 and 1995. Also, from the start of 1993, some BBC Schools programmes were shown (as subject blocks or a series block) overnight as part of a new experiment called Nightschool TV.

When BBC Two's regular programmes concluded for the night, the channel would transfer to Pages from Ceefax, until the service began at 12.30am (2am on Monday mornings). It would continue through the night, ending at 7am. Programming was also broadcast at the weekend, but only for two hours, between 3am and 5am for DynaMo, were shown on Fridays and Saturdays. In January 2004, the service started at 2am every day and continuing until 6am when programming on BBC Two would begin, however this was not always the case. The service then ran between 4am and 6am, and usually did not operate when schools were not open (Summer, Easter Holidays etc.).

In 1997, when the BBC rebranded, The Learning Zone was renamed BBC Learning Zone, became a separate strand of programming in its own right and became independent of BBC Two.

In 2015, the BBC confirmed that 'due to budget cuts', the service would no longer be running on BBC Two. Instead, it was said to be moving online on the BBC Education and BBC Teach websites. The final BBC Learning Zone aired in the early hours of 24 July 2015.

== Programming ==
The service, upon launch, was used for the transfer of programming, including the bulk of Open University programming, secondary school programming previously from the BBC Schools strand as well as other programming.

Programming was divided up into segments, as seen below:

- Open University and General Interest – Programming from the open university for Degree students and other programmes that may be of interest to the public. This later category came about by the Open University's use of education programming in the style of prime time documentaries, pioneered by Coast. Also included in the category was the programme WorkSkills, that helped with applying for jobs, however this programme ceased after some time. This segment ceased when the Open University stopped programming.
- Languages and Travel – Programming focusing of teaching new languages and the differing cultures. Programming in French, German, Spanish, Italian, Chinese, Portuguese, Greek and Japanese. This service ceased in Summer 2012.
- Schools – Programming from BBC Schools for students at GCSE and A-Level and for those in Secondary and Primary education. Includes repeats of old schools programmes.

These segments ran on alternate days and for only certain times of the year. The segments and programming may be changed during exam seasons, so programming is revision orientated, with the programme BBC Bitesize being a staple of the schedule.

On 15 December 2006, the last Open University programme was broadcast on the service, following which the strand was removed from the service. Schools programmes ended when BBC Learning Zone finished in 2015. Languages programmes (shown during the summer months) were dropped after Summer 2012. BBC Two instead now shows rolling programme previews under the name This is BBC Two. In 2010, the remaining primary schools programmes, previously shown at 11am for one hour during weekdays (except Wednesday), were transferred to the Learning Zone from BBC Two.

Unusual among BBC services, few to no programme shown on the BBC Learning Zone is available to be watched again on the BBC iPlayer, due to rights restrictions on the programmes. As compensation, the BBC launched a section called Learning Zone Broadband, or more simply Class Clips which includes segments from Learning Zone as well as clips taken from other relevant BBC programmes. These clips were available to watch on demand over the internet for free. This service provided teachers and students with a range of resources, including case studies and experiments, to use in class or elsewhere. The service is no longer in use. Clips are now available on the BBC Teach website.

== Presentation ==
Upon launch on 9 October 1995, the strand was introduced with a variation of the "2" idents and had a logo featuring an orange stylised Learning Zone logo.

On 6 October 1997, when the strand became separate, the station's final identification was created, showing an oak tree and an acorn. The acorn falls from a tree, while a number of identification processes take place, including a thermal image, a database match on computer, measurements taken, newspaper archives, aerodynamic investigation, cross section, 3D image and the name in different languages before the acorn finally falls to the ground and seeds to become an oak sapling. The ident is accompanied by an updated logo featuring the BBC logo and 'Learning Zone' written after in capital letters. The identification was generally only used at the beginning of the strand. Links between programmes were made using programme menus and continuity voice overs. Programme menus and static information slides were made using the logo at the bottom, and an image related to the identification featuring in the background. Very few programme slides and promotions were used.

In 2004, four supplementary idents were introduced to link into the programmes themselves. They still featured the 1997 presentational style and were based around the theme of the seasons, with one used each season. They featured the oak tree in the background and people at rest and play around it. The 1997 ident was still used to open the strand. Also introduced in 2004, were opening films to introduce the programme menu. These featured clips showing on screen of the programmes in the Learning Zone and of the acorn falling, before a version of the logo with back-lighting moving from left to right, accompanied by the music 'Wired' by Atmosphere Music Ltd. The programme menu was also redesigned with falling acorns as the background. Both new devices were colour-coded to the strand: blue for Open University, green for languages and red for schools.

Unusually for a terrestrial BBC channel, the strand is accompanied by a BBC Two DOG in the top left corner of the screen. Other DOGs accompany the programmes, while some lengthy educational programmes include a timer in the top right corner to make it easier to scan and find the section the viewer wants.

The acorn ident is the longest BBC ident ever used, having beaten the BBC Two "2" idents in 2008.

== Similar strands ==
- Schools programming had previously been broadcast in a designated BBC Schools strand shown in the morning and early afternoon on BBC1 and from September 1983 on BBC2. These broadcasts have since lost their special strand, and the final programmes moved from BBC Two to the Learning Zone in 2010.
- Open University programming became common viewing during daytime and weekend hours for many years since 1971, before having the hours reduced in the 1990s. In May 2004, the OU announced it was to stop its late-night programmes on BBC Two, and the last of which were broadcast on 16 December 2006. The university shifted its focus to semi-academic television programmes, such as many now broadcast on BBC Four.
- The digital channel BBC Knowledge was launched in 1999 following the launch of the Learning Zone, featuring educational and cultural programming. The channel ceased broadcasting in 2002 to make way for CBeebies (6am until 7pm) and BBC Four (7pm until 4am).
- A programming strand called BBC Learning on the subscription international channel BBC Prime broadcast similar programming. The service was axed in August 2006.
- During the COVID-19 pandemic of 2020–2021, CBBC operated a similar strand called the "Bitesize Learning Zone" between 9am and 12pm.
