= FC Dynamo Myrhorod =

Defunct football club based in Myrhorod, Ukraine

Dynamo Myrhorod
- Founded: 1960s
- Dissolved: 1980s
- Ground: Central Stadium, Myrhorod

Football Club Dynamo Myrhorod (Ukrainian: ФК Динамо Миргород); was a Ukrainian Soviet football team based in Myrhorod, Ukraine.

== History ==
Physical culture and sports association "Dynamo" - Ukraine in Poltava region was established in early 1920s. In 1960s a football club was established. Team was created from soldiers serving in 4th Governmental Signal Regiment of the KGB MUN 28684. Regiments commander, Colonel T. Smanov together with two officers: Oleksii Poliakov and Yurii Sukhanov organized the team. Sukhanov also played for the team. In 1959 the club won their group and advanced to the final part of championship. They won bronze medals for finishing third. During the 1960 club failed to advance to the final stage. Kremenchuk football historian Yurii Pyrukhin lists the team from Myrhorod as House of Military Officers not as Dynamo. In 1961 Pyrukhin and Lomov list the club as House of Military Officers. Both list is as Dynamo in 1962. In 1967 the club finished second in second league of Poltava Oblast championship. During 1968 Dynamo finished eighth. Next year they were eleventh. In 1970 they finished fifth. In 1971 Dynamo won bronze medals in last match of the season. Next year the finished fourth. In later part of the 70s team was not performing as well and was dissolved.

== Honours ==
Poltava Oblast Championship

Third place (2): 1959, 1971

== Sources ==
- Pyrukhin, Yurii, Энциклопедия кременчугского футбола [Encyclopedia of Kremenchuk football] (in Russian), Kremenchuk
- Lomov, Anatolii; Stadnychenko, Oleksandr (2009), 100 Років Полтавському Футболу [100 Years of Poltava Football] (in Ukrainian), Poltava: Poltava, ISBN 978-966-97035-0-7
- Lomov, Anatolii; Kryvorotko, Serhii (2010), Энциклопедия Полтавского Футбола (1909-2010) [Encyclopedia of Poltava Football (1909-2010)] (in Russian), Poltava: OOO "ASMI", ISBN 978-966-182-118-6
- Lomov, Anatolii (2019), Полтавщина спортивна в обличчях і фактах. [Sport in Poltava region in faces and facts.] (in Ukrainian), Poltava: PP Dyvosvit, ISBN 978-617-633-252-7
