= Texas Department of Assistive and Rehabilitative Services =

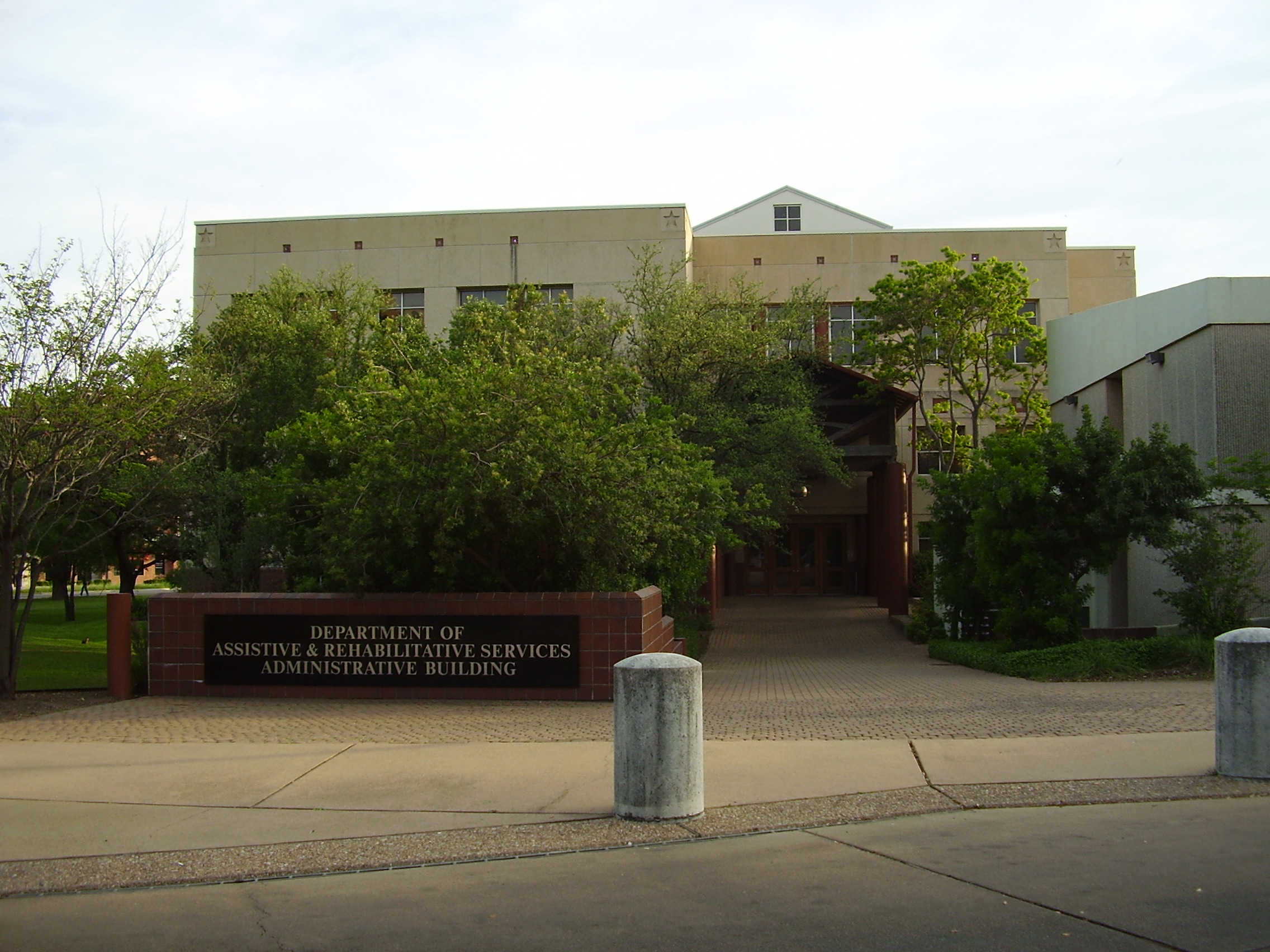
The headquarters of the former Texas Department of Assistive and Rehabilitative Services

The Texas Department of Assistive and Rehabilitative Services (DARS) was a Texas state agency that was part of the Texas Health and Human Services Commission. The agency worked with Texans with disabilities and children with developmental delays to improve the quality of their lives and to enable their full participation in society.

The agency was headquartered at 4800 North Lamar Boulevard in Austin.

Former Sub-agencies:

- Division for Rehabilitation Services (DRS) provides programs to help people with disabilities prepare for, find, and maintain employment.
- Office for Deaf and Hard of Hearing Services (DHHS) works in partnership with people who are deaf or hard-of-hearing to eliminate societal and communication barriers.
- Division for Blind Services (DBS) assists blind or visually impaired individuals and their families.
- Early Childhood Intervention (ECI) Services, a statewide program for families with children ages three or younger with disabilities and developmental delays.
- Division for Disability Determination Services (DDS), funded entirely through the Social Security Administration (SSA), makes disability determinations for Texans with severe disabilities who apply for Social Security Disability Insurance and/or Supplemental Security Income.

As of September 1, 2016, DARS was dissolved by an act of the sunset commission. The Sunset Commission periodically reviews the performance of State/public agencies and institutions, recommending revisions—and terminations.

The Texas Workforce Commission assumed the following programs

- Vocational Rehabilitation Services
- Blind & Visually Impaired Services
- Criss Cole Rehabilitation Center
- Independent Living Services for Older
- Individuals Who Are Blind
- Business Services - Vocational Rehabilitation
- Providers’ Resources - Vocational Rehabilitation
- Business Enterprises of Texas
- Rehabilitation Council of Texas
- Service Animal Information

And the Health and Human Services Department retained the following Programs

- Autism Program
- Blind Children's Vocational Discovery & Development Program
- Blindness Education, Screening & Treatment Program
- Comprehensive Rehabilitation Services
- Deaf & Hard of Hearing Services
- Disability Determination
- Early Childhood Intervention Program
- Independent Living Services
