= BBC Knowledge =

Television channel

- Logo used from 1999 to 2002

Programming
- Picture format: 576i (16:9 SDTV)

Ownership
- Owner: BBC
- Sister channels: BBC One; BBC Two; BBC News 24; BBC Parliament; BBC Choice

History
- Launched: 1 June 1999; 27 years ago
- Closed: 2 March 2002; 24 years ago
- Replaced by: BBC Four

Availability (at time of closure)

Terrestrial
- ITV Digital: Channel 13

BBC Knowledge was a short-lived television channel in the United Kingdom. It is owned by the BBC and launched on 1 June 1999, which broadcast documentary, cultural, and educational programmes. It was shut down permanently on 2 March 2002, and replaced by BBC Four.

== History ==
=== Background ===
The BBC had wanted to expand into the digital television market for a number of years, as their Director-General Sir John Birt said, "The BBC has always been a pioneer of technology". Originally, this was by their association with Flextech, which spawned the UKTV network. Both companies had different ideas on how the new channels should be run: the BBC wanted the channels branded as BBC channels, but Flextech wanted the channels to contain advertising. The BBC refused, stating that no domestic BBC channel should carry advertising.

In the end, a compromise was made: Two of the channels would launch as BBC channels: BBC Showcase (which later became BBC Choice), and the then-called BBC Learning, with the remainder of the channels being launched as the UKTV network, intended to be BBC in all but name. Prior to the launch, the channel changed name from BBC Learning to BBC Knowledge.

=== Launch ===
The channel launched on 1 June 1999, broadcasting for six hours each day. The channel had plans to be a new, multimedia channel, operating on television, online, and interactive television, and showing educational and informative programming. The channel's initial schedule style was a 'bright and breezy' approach to education, aimed at both adults and children, with viewers encouraged to get involved and contribute to the programming. Original programmes included a GCSE survival guide based on the popular BBC series "Bitesize", entitled "Bitesize Etc", and The Kit, a technology and computing programme aimed at getting viewers online and embracing digital. Its launch budget was of £10 million.

In April 2000, the channel started airing Kino, a monthly showcase of European arthouse cinema.

=== Relaunch ===
A few years into the channel's existence, it was becoming clear that the channel's original format was not working in its aim of interacting with viewers and making learning fun. The channel was receiving consistently poor ratings, and the BBC decided to relaunch the channel. The relaunched channel was given a new visual identity, and from 17 November 2001 became a 24-hour channel, caused by the move of BBC Knowledge from the SDN to the BBC multiplex on the DTT service. In addition, the format was changed to a serious documentary channel with scheduling arranged into 'zones' depending on topics.

=== Closure ===
However, the real reason for the shift in programming was because the incumbent government delayed approving new BBC digital plans. BBC Three and Four were planned to have launched in 2001, but because of the plans being delayed, the BBC decided to relaunch the two channels in the meantime. It had been planned since October 2000 that Knowledge would be replaced with BBC Four. Eventually, the new digital plans were approved, and in February 2002, the hours were cut back for CBeebies to launch the new channel. BBC Knowledge was closed down in the final hours of 2 March 2002, and BBC Four replaced it the next day.

From mid-2001, BBC Knowledge was essentially a test platform for the style of the new channel. At closing time, John Davies of The Times called the replacement "an upgrade of BBC Knowledge".

== Visual identity ==
One example of "Ladders of Learning" ident on BBC Knowledge

The launch identity consisted of cartoon characters climbing 'ladders of learning' between clouds against an orange background. Illustrator Michael Sheehy designed the idents. A white BBC logo with 'Knowledge' after it in capital letters was located at the bottom of the screen. The ident image would also be present in the background of the end promotions, channel menus advertising upcoming programmes, and in video links presented by members of the public. In addition to this, a DOG was used on the channel, located in the top left of the screen, which displayed the web address for the channel, linking in with the interactive learning element, however this was replaced with the BBC Knowledge logo before too long.

Later on, the idents changed to follow a strand layout, with different idents for each strand. These featured an object, before a fact about it related to the strand appears and ends on an image with the strand name shown clearly on screen, with a letter encircled at the centre of the screen. It is unclear whether these idents were replacements of the animated idents, or complementary to them. However, it appears they were complementary, with these idents being used in the stranded sections, and the animated idents used for general interest programming.

Following the relaunch in 2001, all different idents were dropped in favour of a single ident, featuring numerous circles made out of different structures reflecting the new strands.
