= BBC Bitesize =

British educational website from the BBC

- A screenshot of BBC Bitesize homepage
- Website type: Free online study resource
- Available in: English; Welsh; Gaelic
- Predecessor: BBC Schools
- Creator: BBC
- Website: bbc.co.uk/bitesize
- Launched: 1998
- Current status: Active

BBC Bitesize, also abbreviated to Bitesize, is the BBC's free online study support resource for school-age people in the United Kingdom. It is designed to aid people in both schoolwork and, for older people, exams.

== History ==
GCSE Bitesize was launched in January 1998, covering seven subjects. For each subject, a one- or two-hour long TV programme would be broadcast overnight in the BBC Learning Zone block, and supporting material was available in books and on the BBC website. At the time, only around 9% of UK households had access to the internet at home.

In 2023, videos from Bitesize were adapted and dubbed over in Dari and Pashto in order to be broadcast in Afghanistan, where education for girls has been stopped by the Taliban government. The show was called Dars, which means "lessons" in both languages.

== National sections ==
=== England ===
The Key Stage 1, 2 and 3 along with GCSE section covers a range of subjects. In Key Stage 1, 17 subjects are available, including Art and Design, Computing, Design and Technology, English, Geography, History, Maths, Music, Physical Education, PSHE, Citizenship, Religious Education, Science, and Modern Foreign Languages. The Key Stage 2 site covers 23 subjects, Key Stage 3 section contains 33 subjects, and the GCSE section contains 49 subjects across several exam boards.

=== Scotland ===
Until 2014, the Standard Grade section of the site had 12 subjects: Biology, History, Chemistry, Computing Studies, Maths, English, Modern Studies (a course exclusive to Scotland), French, Physical Education, Geography, and Physics. The site was updated in 2014 to replace the Standard Grade section with National 4 and National 5 sections. Gaelic versions of these were also made available.

Until 2014, in the Higher section, Biology, English, Geography, Maths, Chemistry, History, Modern Studies, Physics and the Scotland-only subject Scottish Gaelic were available. The Higher section was also updated to the new Curriculum for Excellence qualification. Early and 1st level, 2nd level, 3rd level, and 4th level resources were added to bring the site in line with the Curriculum for Excellence.

=== Wales ===
The CS3 and TGAU sections are in Welsh. Links to the English language sections are included.

=== Northern Ireland ===
In 2014, a Northern Ireland section was added to the site. It solely contains links to the English language KS1/KS2/KS3/GCSE sections.

== See also ==
- Educational technology
- Study skills for exam preparation
