= BBC Two 1991–2001 idents =

Package of television signifiers created by Lambie-Nairn

Paint, the first of this series to be broadcast on 16 February 1991, and the last to be broadcast during the first run from 1991 until 2001. Also the last to be broadcast in Northern Ireland in 2018.

The BBC Two 1991–2001 idents were broadcast on BBC Two in the United Kingdom from 16 February 1991 until 19 November 2001, and again from 9 July 2014 until 26 September 2018. Consisting of a sans-serif '2' in Gill Sans, accompanied by the colour viridian, the idents were created by branding agency Lambie-Nairn (and later, Red Bee Media) who also created the Channel 4 logo.

The ident package was retained after the corporate rebrand of the BBC in October 1997, when a new logo and additional idents were introduced, as the existing ident package was already a hit with viewers. The idents were taken out of service in November 2001 and later revived on 21 June 2014 for "90s Night" and in July 2014 to commemorate the 50th anniversary of BBC Two. They replaced the "Window on the World" idents and were broadcast until the evening of Wednesday 26 September 2018.

== Conception ==
The newly recruited BBC2 controller, Alan Yentob, noticed that the then-logo for the channel, which featured the word 'TWO' in red, green and blue within a white background and the 'O' being white, was affecting the reputation of BBC2. Surveys commissioned realised that most viewers thought the branding was "dull and old-fashioned". He then decided to commission a worthy successor capable of displaying the personality of the channel, revealing his thoughts in the How Do They Do That? episode - about the idents.

I realised there was a problem almost as soon as I took over the channel [BBC2]. It was obvious that the logo [TWO] made absolutely no impact. In fact, it was something anyone could have told you. It was singularly unmemorable, and told you nothing about the personality of the channel. So we decided to commission a corporate design company to do some research.

— Alan Yentob

The idents were designed by the late branding expert Martin Lambie-Nairn, and first aired on the same day as the BBC1 virtual globe ident, also designed by Lambie-Nairn as part of a corporate rebrand of both channels.

We took this '2', actually, and you think to yourself "Well, there's nothing special about this". But there is something special about this, actually. It's a very distinctive '2'. It has very sharp bits on it and it's rather nice and fat. The reason we wanted that particular '2' is because we wanted to do things with it. So, you need lots of '2', lots of body on the '2' in order to achieve that.

— Martin Lambie-Nairn

== Idents ==
The idents featured a sans-serif '2' in a variety of different forms and environments usually accompanied by an element of the colour viridian and accompanied by a static corporate logo DOG below the '2'. Another DOG often used with the look was a small '888' legend in the top right of the screen. This meant that subtitles were available to accompany the programme on Ceefax page 888. Following the 1997 rebrand, the BBC logo was changed, with the word TWO added after the logo at the bottom of the screen. The '888' legend was also phased out on 1 July 1999, to be replaced with 'Subtitles' following the uptake in digital television and the increased use of the new BBC Text service. A section of the TV programme How Do They Do That? that was broadcast on 15 February 1995 described how the graphics and sound of some of the idents were created.

The clock idents had been changed through years and were mainly used for closedowns and news. The first clock ident was used in February until December 1991, the second was used in December 1991 until October 1997. The clock was edited in October 1997 with the new logo. This was the last BBC Two logo to use the clock ident.

The new idents commissioned after 1997 placed less emphasis on the use of the colour viridian and the bell/harp music. Later on, as the Internet began to grow, the URL of BBC's website (www.bbc.co.uk) was included in idents on-screen from January 2000. On 27 September 2018, BBC Two received a rebrand, with the sans-serif '2' symbol being retired after 27 years; a new set of idents featuring a curve motif resembling a '2' were introduced. The last ident from this set, Optics, was aired one minute before the new set of idents were introduced.

=== Ident list ===
==== 1991–1997 ====
Title	Description
Paint	A white polystyrene '2' on a black and white background, splashed by a blob of viridian paint which hurtles in horizontally from the right-hand side of the screen.
Water	A viridian-coloured '2' on a background of the same colour, half submerged in a pool of water at a 45-degree angle.
Blade	A sharp, metal '2' falling into a viridian-coloured block and impaling it on its edge, standing and wobbling.
Neon	A '2' on a black background is depicted with seven viridian-coloured neon lights attached to it, which flash in random sequences.
Copper Sparks	Also known as Copper Cut-Out. Features a copper cut-out of a '2' from which sparks fly, as the figure glows at its edges.
Glass	A glass-cut '2' against a grey background, which reflects light in various directions.
Silk	A swathe of viridian-coloured silk drifting over the top of a '2' shape.
Shadow	A cast shadow of a '2' rotates against a viridian-coloured wall.
Flowers	Also known as Garden. A circular patch of grass in the middle sprouts several white flowers that form the shape of the '2'.
Powder	A birds-eye view of the '2' falling onto a bed of white powder, revealing a layer of viridian powder beneath it, left streaked around the '2' as the stray particles clear away.
Optic	Also known as Optics. Includes many optical fibres of mainly viridian and green colour, swaying from side to side, initially with great momentum but slowly and eventually settling into the shape of the '2' symbol.
Car	A viridian-coloured '2' with an aerial moves about on wheels in a yellow studio, in the same manner as a remote-controlled car.
Jumping Dog	Also known as Dog. A fluffy mint green '2' whirring, yapping and doing back flips in the manner of a mechanical toy dog on the same mint green table against the shaded-red background.
Firecracker	A viridian-coloured '2' on a rusty-looking brown desk, with live firecrackers attached to it, which then explode.
Diary	A white '2' on a black background, with paper layers peeling off and drifting away.
Steam	Water droplets falling onto a viridian-coloured, metallic '2' of extremely hot temperature, turning into steam.

==== 1997–2001 ====
Title	Description
Toy Ducks	Also known as Duck. This ident depicted a soapy setting, featuring a yellow '2' in the style of a toy rubber duck emerging from soapy water. Shorter stings saw the '2' sitting in a bath with small rubber ducks, or pretending to be a shark, or a submarine.
Paint Pot	In a follow-up to the original Paint ident, a silver paint pot is bombarded by lots of little viridian '2's, once again falling sideways.
Zapper and Fly	Also known simply as Zapper. This featured a fly running into a fly zapper in the shape of a '2' upon a wall, causing it to explode on contact.
Swan	Introduced at the start of 1998, it featured three grey '2's, resembling cygnets, swimming past a swan, which shakes its head shortly after.
Dalek	Black and white Daleks in the shape of '2's move through a grey corridor. A variant on this ident, named Exterminate, has the sequence opening with the Dalek '2' shouting the familiar phrase.
Excalibur	Excalibur featured a cerulean-blue '2' rising from a pool of water sideways.
Catalyst	Catalyst features a turquoise polystyrene '2' on a black and dark teal background, in this ident, a bunch of liquid droplets fly in from the top right corner of the screen and cause flames to flare up around the '2' on contact.
Wave	Also known as Wave Day. This featured a dark cyan '2' within a shaded-white background and a sheet of blue liquid that splashes around it throughout.
Predator	Predator begins centered on a '2'-shaped butterfly sitting within a jungle environment. The camera then zooms out, and the '2' makes its getaway, but is gobbled up by a larger green '2' in the form of a Venus flytrap that swoops in from out of nowhere. This ident was typically used to introduce drama series, as well as programmes on nature, but was also utilised for other entertainment and sports programming and gave a more extreme attitude to said programmes.
Kebab	Kebab has a '2' made of meat roasting on a kebab spit, spinning around in flames. This ident was typically used to introduce food-based series, but was also utilised for other entertainment, factual and sports programming.
Woodpecker	This ident depicted five metal poles, of varying distance, against an orange background, with '2's descending down the poles in the same manner as a mechanical woodpecker.
Wave Night	A variation on Wave, which is set in a darker background and liquid pool, with a bright cyan '2'.
Warp	This ident depicted the '2' warping and twisting in a variety of ways. It ultimately went unused for being too abstract.

Preceded by TWO	BBC television idents (first run); 16 February 1991 – 19 November 2001	Succeeded by Personality 2s
Preceded by Window on the World	BBC television idents (second run); 9 July 2014 – 26 September 2018	Succeeded by Curve
