= Martin Lambie-Nairn =

English designer (1945–2020)

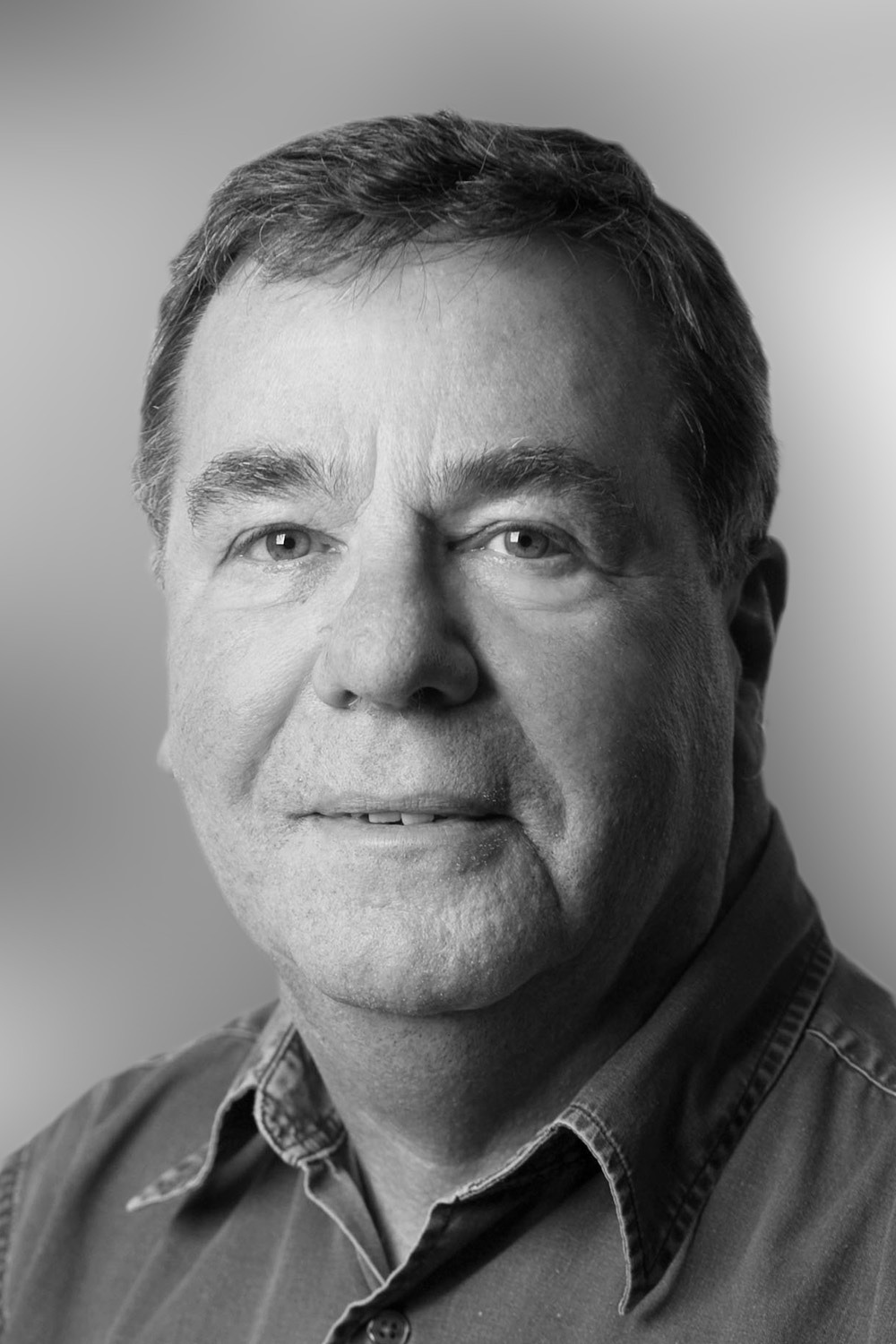
- Martin Lambie-Nairn in 2008
- Born: Martin John Lambie; 5 August 1945; Croydon, Surrey, England
- Died: 25 December 2020 (aged 75); England
- Education: Canterbury College of Art
- Occupation: Designer
- Years active: 1965–2020
- Known for: Channel 4 "Blocks" logo BBC1 "Virtual Globe"; BBC Two 'The 2s' idents The Personality 2s Rhythm & Movement; BBC One 'Balloon' idents Spitting Image; TSI "Masked troubadour" idents and bumpers
- Spouse: Cordelia Summers (m. 1970)
- Children: 3

Martin John Lambie-Nairn (5 August 1945 – 25 December 2020) was an English designer. He was the founder of his branding agency Lambie-Nairn and was the creative director of branding agency ML-N. He is recognised for having redefined television brand identity design, being the first to embrace computer technologies to apply branding to screen-based media.

Lambie-Nairn was also a co-creator of 1980s satirical puppet show Spitting Image. Amongst his most prominent works are the original Channel 4 logo and idents created in 1982, the batch of over 30 idents for BBC Two that first aired on 16 February 1991, the masked troubadour's idents and bumpers for TSI created in 1993, the 1997 corporate re-brand for the whole BBC, and the 2008 BBC Regional News titles. In conjunction with his agency, he also created launch packages for certain other BBC channels.

== Early life and education ==
Lambie-Nairn was born Martin John Lambie in Croydon and educated at Canterbury College of Art (later known as Kent Institute of Art & Design, now the University for the Creative Arts).

== Career ==
=== Early work ===
Lambie-Nairn's career in television began at the BBC in 1965, where he worked as an assistant designer. Roles as a graphic designer at Rediffusion, ITN and London Weekend Television followed. At ITN, he worked on the on-screen graphics for the Apollo space missions and later designed the ITN corporate logo and title sequence for News at Ten. Lambie-Nairn established his own company, Robinson Lambie-Nairn, with partner Colin Robinson in 1976 after leaving LWT, and he went on to develop new graphic presentation techniques for Weekend World. The business expanded and was renamed Lambie-Nairn & Company in 1990.

Computer animation enabled him to produce what became regarded as a revolutionary identity for Channel 4, the "Blocks" logo. This identity launched the fledgling TV channel on 2 November 1982 and remained at the heart of the channel's on-air presentation for 14 years. In 1981 he created the original idea for the UK TV series Spitting Image which ran for 11 years. He received the credit that the show was "based on an original lunch with Martin Lambie-Nairn."

Following Channel 4 and Spitting Image, he worked as a director of computer-animated commercials, producing the first ever 30-second computer-generated TV advertisement in the UK, which was a commercial for Smarties.

=== Corporate identities ===
In 1990, Lambie-Nairn became consultant creative director of the BBC brand, a position he held for 12 years. During this period Lambie-Nairn and his company rebranded the BBC and all of its outputs, across all media. The best known channel identity was for BBC Two, commissioned by then-controller Alan Yentob in a bid to make the channel appear less stuffy. All of the idents in the first series employed traditional live action. Later, with the change of target audience, a new generation of idents was commissioned and produced using CGI. The idents were highly popular, even receiving fan mail. For BBC1, Lambie-Nairn and Daniel Barber redesigned the globe identity, a well-recognized icon of the BBC, having been introduced in 1963.

Later, Lambie-Nairn again redesigned the identity for BBC One – creating the red hot air balloon that was used for a new series of idents aired on BBC One from 4 October 1997. This aimed to capture the idea that the channel brought the whole world to every corner of the United Kingdom. This was part of a wider corporate rebranding which included a redesign of the BBC blocks logo and also a new package for BBC News which utilized a warmer color palette for the first time. As the BBC's primary external agency, Lambie-Nairn also oversaw the design of channel identities for emerging digital properties BBC News 24 (now called BBC News), BBC World, BBC Choice, BBC Knowledge, CBeebies, CBBC, BBC Four and BBC Three.

In 1997, he wrote Brand Identity for Television: With Knobs On. He used the book to reveal how he and his colleagues achieved key identities.

Lambie-Nairn also co-conceived the Rhythm & Movement idents for BBC One first shown on 29 March 2002. In 2001, he created BBC Two's 2001–2007 Personality 2s series of idents, which featured robotic figure 2s, each displaying individual personalities, which went on the air on 19 November.

Throughout collaboration with the BBC, Lambie-Nairn and company also developed the logos and corporate identities for the London Weekday and Central ITV franchises owned by Carlton Communications. He also branded Anglia Television, S4C, TF1, TSI, Arte, NOS, Disney Channel UK, The Business Channel, Alhurra, British Satellite Broadcasting, EuroNews, and many others. In 2002, Lambie-Nairn's agency was also credited for helping rebrand BT Cellnet into the O2 brand based around the metaphor of oxygen.

In 2008, he directed the creation of a new unified red-and-white branding for BBC News. The red and white template had videos of local landmarks, transport and people together. Components of the 2008 identity continue to be in use.

=== Later years ===
In 2009 Lambie-Nairn left the practice he founded to join Heavenly as creative director, leaving in 2011. At Heavenly, he devised the launch identity for Sky Atlantic and also for BBC Entertainment. He subsequently had his own consultancy, ML-N, based in London. In 2011, he worked as a creative consultant in creating a new identity for the Royal Opera House.

Through ML-N, he was appointed consultant creative director for the research company, TNS. In 2016, he had joined Red&White as a non-executive chairman and creative director, where he worked to create a new logo and brand identity for his alma mater, the University of Northampton. In 2020, Lambie-Nairn was interviewed for the BBC Four programme The Sound of TV, which debuted a few weeks before his death.

== Personal life and death ==
Lambie-Nairn died on 25 December 2020 at the age of 75. His death was mentioned during a junction on Channel 4 alongside an original channel ident which Lambie-Nairn oversaw the development of in the 1980s.

He was survived by his wife Cordelia (née Summers) whom he married in 1970.

== Awards ==
Lambie-Nairn was an RDI (Royal Designer for Industry), Fellow of the Royal Television Society, and an ex-president of D&AD. He received the D&AD President's Award, Prince Philip Design Prize, Promax Lifetime Achievement Award and Promax Hall of Fame (USA). He also received a Gold D&AD for his work for Channel 4, multiple Silver D&ADs, a BAFTA for his work for BBC2 and multiple Promax Awards.

Lambie-Nairn held an honorary doctorate of Arts from the University of Lincoln, and was a visiting professor at the Faculty of Art, Architecture and Design. He also held an honorary doctorate of Arts from the University of Northampton.

== Bibliography ==
- Brand Identity for Television With Knobs On, Phaidon Press, 1997 ISBN 978-0-7148-3447-4

== See also ==
- Lambie-Nairn
