= BBC Two "Personality" idents =

Set of idents used on BBC Two (2001–2007)

The Christmas ident from 2002–2004

The BBC Two Personality idents were a set of idents used on BBC Two from 19 November 2001 until 18 February 2007. The idents were produced by the Lambie-Nairn branding agency, who had created the previous look. The idents feature an ivory sans serif white '2' in a yellow environment and performing a variety of tasks, and a purple boxed BBC Two logo.

== Conception ==
Throughout the 1990s, the programming of BBC Two was gradually evolving from factual programming to more light-hearted programming. As a result, the channel's identity at the time was starting to appear alienated - some of the longer-running idents like 'Firecracker', 'Steam', 'Diary', 'Silk' and 'Copper Cut-Out' were retired at the end of 1999 to combat this, with newer, more appropriate idents like 'Catalyst', 'Excalibur', 'Kebab', 'Predator', 'Wave Day', 'Wave Night', and 'Woodpecker' being introduced as a replacement at the start of 2000. However, by 2001, the channel's programming had evolved to a point where it was primarily entertainment-based, and this was seen as completely incompatible with idents that had, at that point, been regularly airing for as long as a decade. It was eventually decided that the channel's identity would need to be changed on a much larger scale in order to fit in with its evolved schedule; one that would equal the popularity of the previous identity, but also to be more light-hearted and appropriate to fit in with the channel's new programming. Martin Lambie-Nairn, the designer of the previous identity, was recalled to create an entirely new identity: the result was that the '2' from before was retained, but it was now anthropomorphised.

At the same time, the BBC Two programme controller changed and the BBC Two channel was directed differently; it wanted to broaden its audience, it wanted to be much lighter and so the identity we had produced for it before became completely wrong. It was based in the art world, if you like, and so we made the 2 into a character.

— Martin Lambie-Nairn

It was also decided to alter the "BBC TWO" logo that had been used previously - this was done by putting the logo in a box, with the BBC stacked on top of the TWO. This design would subsequently be replicated by the other BBC channels between 2002 and 2003.

After this was running for about four or five years, we then had some new programme controllers come in, and they were not at all sympathetic of having the system 'BBC' and then their brand after, same as their colleagues next door. They wanted a logo like proper television channels and proper companies ... we were then called back in, and they said we want a logo. They quite simply said you do it or we get someone else to do it. So I said I would do it, in case someone does something horrid, and so I just put them in a box.

— Martin Lambie-Nairn

== Idents ==
All of the idents were computer-generated and featured the '2' from before in a yellow environment, performing various anthropomorphic activities, sometimes the 2 grows mechanical arms that transform it into a helpful 2. The newly designed box logo for the channel would be located in the bottom right corner of the screen and would always remain there in both the idents and the presentation.

A notable occlusion of the look was that of the clock. When the channel rebranded, no clock design was made for the look. Idents continued the use of the 'Subtitles' DOG in the top right corner from the last look, but also included the BBC Two website URL as a DOG in the top left corner which was removed in 2004. Unlike the previous branding, neither the URL or the 'Subtitles' DOG would fade in.

Title	Air dates	Description
Fish	19 November 2001 – 17 February 2007	Fish features an ivory 2 first rising off the floor before fish entering on screen from the right. The 2 then blows bubbles to scare the fish away, before the fish return to investigate this strange intruder. This ident was the first to be shown at 07:00 before CBBC. The ident was later revised after two months to swap the 2 over, who had previously been back to front during the idents. The music was generic with sound effects of bubbles when the fish swam away.
Bounce	19 November 2001 – 17 February 2007	Bounce was the most generic used of the set. It featured a 2 bouncing around the screen and in and out of the top. It bounced at different angles to a soundtrack with a low note on each bounce. Stills of this ident were used for slides, such as breakdown slides and slides containing information for the BBC Action Line.
Logo	19 November 2001 – 17 February 2007	The 2 stands vigil at the top of the screen surveying the landscape before noticing that the BBC Two logo isn't there, instead being occupied by a white square. The helpful 2 then moves over, and uses its mechanical arms to lift and flip over the BBC Two logo, before retreating to the top of the screen. On the launch of BBC Three or Four, it rotates to the BBC Three (or Four) logo.
Domino	19 November 2001 – 17 February 2007	A huge line of 2s are lined up like dominoes waiting for the 2 on the end to fall, setting off the chain. An instructor helpful 2 blows his whistle: the end 2 wobbles, but falls the wrong way, leaving his fellow 2s stranded and the instructor infuriated.
Bounce Sombre	28 January 2002 – 17 February 2007	This ident, introduced in late January 2002, used the same graphics as Bounce but had a modified soundtrack made of base string instruments with bass drums used when a '2' bounced. This ident was introduced to introduce serious programming, such as Newsnight, following complaints by announcers concerning the lack of an appropriate ident.
Screen Clean	7 February 2002 – 17 February 2007	A dirty black spot has appeared in the middle of the screen. The helpful 2 notices it, and goes to clean it, by breathing on it and then rubbing it off with his hand, before returning to his position.
Drip	15 March 2002 – 17 February 2007	The 2 gets dripped on by water droplets, and wherever he moves around the screen, the droplets always fall on him. The soundtrack that accompanied the music was a short, snappy techno variation of the jingle, with no soundtrack while the 2 is being dripped on. A loud dripping noise is heard each time the 2 is hit.
Invisible Walls	9 May 2002 – 17 February 2007	A 2 glides around the screen, going from left to right and disappearing behind invisible walls, only to reappear at a different point on the screen. The soundtrack is a minimal version of the jingle with surreal overtones when a 2 passes an invisible barrier. This ident was another used to introduce serious programming and gave more variety to said programmes.
Formation	27 June 2002 – 18 February 2007	A 2 slides onto a structure similar in concept to a see-saw. Another 2 then jumps on the other end propelling the 2 atop of a stack of eight 2s all balancing on a ball. The soundtrack is a comical, circus themed version of the jingle. It was used mainly for comedy programmes and introduction into CBBC and CBeebies children's strands. It was the last Personality ident to be shown before the start of the CBeebies block on 18 February 2007. The junction after CBBC had the first of the new 'Window on the World' idents.
Remote Control	28 June 2002 – 17 February 2007	A 2 comes along to find a remote control device on the floor. Upon transforming into a helpful 2, picking it up and shaking it, he moves it, to find he controls himself. He reverses quickly, does a spin before crashing into the screen, causing the screen and BBC Two logo to get knocked, and the remote control aerial to get bent. The soundtrack was a techno rendition of the jingle. The knocked effect to the BBC Two logo was removed in 2004, when the URL was removed.
Drum	3 August 2002 – 17 February 2007	A 2 bounces up and down, as if on the skin of a drum, in time to the music: a reggae rendition of the jingle. During this, the 2 falls onto its side and upside down. This ident was created to introduce a season of programmes entitled "Jamaica 40", but was retained afterwards.
Paintbrush	28 October 2002 – 17 February 2007	The 2 notices a brush sticking out from the BBC Two logo. The ever curious helpful 2 picks up the brush, and paints a stylised '2' on the screen in the same purple as the logo. He then adds a dot in the 2 and a dot on the other side before drawing a line underneath the bottom, similar to a mouth, and another above a dot to create a face. He stands back to admire his work.
Sticky Label	11 March 2003 – 17 February 2007	A 2 notices that the logo is located in the centre of the screen at a slanted angle, as opposed to its normal bottom right position. The helpful 2 then peels off the logo and sticks it back in its corner. However the logo is stuck to his fingers and he can't peel it off. He tries flicking it off only to have it get stuck on his shoulder where he can't see or get to it. The ident was accompanied by a twanging soundtrack and version of the jingle.
The Big Read	29 March 2003 – 17 February 2007	Six helpful 2s are sat reading books gently and in time with each other. However, one of the helpful 2s, who is eager to learn the plot, flicks through in a hurry to the end and then laughs softly. The other helpful 2s then follow, and too laugh at the outcome. The ident is accompanied by a gentle flute version of the jingle and was used to introduce BBC Two's The Big Read.
Fire	30 June 2003 – 17 February 2007	A 2 moves into centre screen before sprouting a flame thrower. The background goes a dark yellow as it starts spraying fire everywhere as it reverses, going round in circles and jumping spraying fire in bursts. It stops and retracts the flamethrower, but only when it sets the BBC Two logo on fire. The background and 2 return to normal as the logo continues to burn. Fire was shown before a montage of idents in the late hours of 17 February 2007.
The Big Read Crowd	20 October 2003 – 17 February 2007	A variation on The Big Read: instead of six helpful 2s, there is now a whole screen full all reading. However, the centre helpful 2 can't help but flicking quickly to the back, sparking off the rest of them. Used primarily for The Big Read. Although this ident remained in circulation after their introduction, it was rarely seen. It was one 2 of idents not included during the final montage (the other being the 2005/6 Christmas ident).
Morris Dancers	1 May 2005 – 17 February 2007	A helpful 2 playing an accordion pans out to reveal six other helpful 2s, complete with handkerchiefs, partaking in Morris Dancing. They continue to weave amongst one another and wave their handkerchiefs until the ident ends. The soundtrack features the jingle before a morris style tune with electric guitar at the end kicks in. This was the final ident to be added to the regular roster before the entire set was revamped in 2007 (not counting the Frosty and Venus Fly Trap idents as they were both originally part of the 1991-2001 set).
Frosty	10 February 2006 – 17 February 2007	Used to introduce coverage of the Winter Olympics 2006, this ident featured a huge ice '2' with small white 2s skating on top of and falling off of said 2, against a blue background. This ident is not new, but in fact the BBC Two Christmas ident from 2000, albeit with the new logo and a different soundtrack. Following the games, the ident was retained and regularly used, for sporting events.
Venus Fly Trap	22 May 2006 – 17 February 2007	Venus Fly Trap begins centred on a '2'-shaped butterfly sitting within a jungle environment. The camera then zooms out, and the '2' is gobbled up by a larger '2' in the form of a Venus flytrap. The audio has animal sounds in the background, and the music starts off quiet and gentle, but then builds to a dramatic crescendo as the butterfly '2' flies off, followed by a chomping sound as the Venus flytrap swoops in from the left hand side of the screen to swallow its victim, before returning to quietude when the Venus flytrap '2' rests in the centre. This ident was part of the 1991–2001 ident set, named Predator, but was revived, albeit with the new logo. However, although 'Frosty' received a new soundtrack, 'Venus Fly Trap' retained its original music. It was added to introduce the RHS Chelsea Flower Show in 2006, but was retained for programmes like Gardeners' World and nature series.

=== Special ===
BBC Two, for the first time, decided to reuse some of their previous Christmas idents in the years during this era, instead of a new, annual ident. The Christmas idents are as follows:

- Fairy (Christmas 2001) – The helpful 2 holds out his hands, produces a fairy which then zooms up and forms a Christmas tree from her trail. This ident was reused during December 2015 as part of that year's Christmas presentation, but with the soundtrack replaced with a choir repeatedly chanting the "two" to the melody of Ding Dong Merrily on High. This ident was reused during December 2016.
- Snow Sculpture (Christmas 2002) – A helpful 2 moves left in the screen, and as the camera pans round, we see a snow-covered floor. The helpful 2 then makes a snow helpful 2, complete with sticks for arms. This ident was used in conjunction with the Christmas 2001 version. This ident was also used outside of Christmas during spells of snowy weather. This ident was reinstated during December 2015 as part of that year's Christmas presentation, but with the soundtrack replaced with a choir repeatedly singing "two" to the tune of Deck the Halls. This ident was reused during December 2016.
- Ice Cube (Christmas 2003) – The 2 is trapped in an ice cube that slides around all over the place. This ident was used in conjunction with the Christmas 2001 version and the Christmas 2002 version. This ident was also used outside of Christmas during spells of hot weather.
- Christmas 2004 – The idents from Christmas 2001, 2002, and 2003 were reused.
- Stars (Christmas 2005) – The 2 is formed out of stars with light trails zooming around the screen against a dark yellow/black background. Variations included one of the stars hitting the screen and the trails tying themselves up in knots. No previous idents were used. This was the final Christmas ident produced during this period. It was not included during the final montage.
- Christmas 2006 – The 2005 Christmas ident was reused.

Near the end of the period, special idents were used to introduce special programmes.

- As part of BBC Two's Pedigree Comedy strand, three new idents featuring the fluffy 2 from 1993 interacting with other dogs were used. The fluffy dog also appeared in promotions.
- A special ident to introduce The Armstrongs featured a leather style 2 being looked after by the title characters.
- A series on homes produced 2s in two very distinct living rooms – one was a stately home with huge amounts of decoration with a decorated porcelain 2 on a pedestal, another a dark blue and green nature inspired room, with the 2 as an outline on the wall.
- Another special ident to introduce Kath & Kim featured a yellow fluffy 2 on the brown desk whilst Kath and Kim discusses this thing before the show starts. The Drum ident can also been on the several screens in the background.
- For BBC Two's 40th anniversary in 2004, a number of idents were altered so that the logo rotated to display '40 Years'. The Invisible Walls ident was also altered, so that as the 2 passed between the walls, previous BBC Two idents were projected onto the 2 (the Cube, the TWO, etc.).
- The 2004 40th Anniversary ident was then remade for use on BBC Two Northern Ireland in 2014 as part of its "Afternoon Classics" block.
- In 2003, BBC Two was made channel of the year. In response, a number of the idents were altered so after a few seconds, the BBC Two logo would rotate to display 'Channel of the Year'.
- Four Northern Ireland-only idents were created. In one, which debuted in February 2002, the helpful 2 snaps its fingers and creates the Giant's Causeway. The ident was edited before its first transmission due to how the tall height of the columns, the overuse of the "shaky-cam" effect, and the smoke were too evocative of the September 11 terrorist attacks. The original version was broadcast in October 2014, when BBC Northern Ireland celebrated 90 years of coverage with special idents. In another, the helpful 2 forms a camera from its 'beak' and takes a photograph of the large fish sculpture located on the banks of the Lagan at Donegall Quay, Belfast. A similar variant of this ident was produced, showing the helpful 2 taking a picture of the Slemish landscape, but never aired. The last ident features the helpful 2 at a table with an Ulster Fry but rather than eating the dish it eats a shaker.

Another special ident was created in 2002, following the launch of BBC Four. This special variation of Logo involved the 2 rotating the box to display 'BBC Two' as normal, before rotating it again to display the BBC Four black box logo. This was used before the "BBC Four on BBC Two" strand. Two other variants were also produced of the ident. One included the BBC Three logo for their programming displayed on the channel, but this was rarely used because BBC One repeated a lot of BBC Three's programming (the only known time this was used, was to introduce a simulcast of the first two hours of the launch) and the other had the BBC Three/Four logo replaced with the BBC 2W logo, which was shown in Wales only.

== Criticisms ==
The package has been praised for its creativity, but ultimately largely seen as inferior to its predecessors, for a number of issues. The first of these was that there is significantly less choice. At the launch of the last look there were eleven launch idents, as compared to four with the personality 2s. This was especially noticed by the announcers, and the network director apparently complained to anyone who would listen about the lack of choice. In addition to this, the similarities in style between each ident resulted in them becoming monotonous over time.

A common criticism of the look was the lack of an appropriate ident to introduce serious programming or news items. The Invisible Walls and Bounce Sombre idents went some way towards rectifying this, however the bright yellow colour scheme diminished the effect of any serious outlook it was trying to convey.

Another common criticism of BBC Two itself is that, following the launch of BBC Four, BBC Two had been transferring arts and serious programming to the new channel which many viewers were unable to receive. This was rectified in the BBC Four on BBC Two strand, and to mark this distinction, a special ident was made. This problem was eventually solved completely with the advent of digital switchover.

== See also ==
- BBC Two 1991–2001 idents
- BBC Two "Window on the World" idents
- BBC One "Balloon" idents
- BBC One "Rhythm & Movement" idents
- History of BBC television idents

Preceded by 1991–2001 2s (first run)	BBC television idents 19 November 2001 – 18 February 2007	Succeeded by Window on the World
