= Trovatore mascherato =

Swiss-Italian TV idents and bumpers

Il Trovatore mascherato (Italian: The Masked Troubadour) is a series of on-screen channel identities and TV bumpers used on the Swiss-Italian TV channel TSI from September 27, 1993 to 1997. It features a masked troubadour, who was played by the British actor Joplin Sibtain. The idents and bumpers were designed by the British brand agency Lambie-Nairn.

== History and creation ==
The idents and bumpers were created by British creative director Martin Lambie-Nairn, in collaboration with Sarah Davies, Daniel Barber, Ian St. John, Augusto Chollet and Armando Bardinello. The project began in 1991, during a European Broadcasting Union (EBU) conference, which discussed the rebranding of the BBC1 and BBC2 logos. Other collaborators on the project also include Charlotte Castle, Jan Casey, Glen Tutssel and Gary Holt.

== The character ==
The character wore a bright red costume and a silver mask in the shape of a splash, created with the effect of molten metal. British actor Chook Sibtain played the troubadour, who had no proper name, but a code name: Erik. Among his skills were juggling with torches, illusionism with doves, and fire-eating. He magically appeared and disappeared in the various scenes, contributing to his mysterious charm.

== Design and inspiration ==
The masked troubadour was designed by the Swiss fashion designer Michele Jannuzzi, while the mask was created by the British company Asylum Models & Effects, inspired by Italian theatre, commedia dell'arte and above all by the Venice Carnival. The character was not supposed to be either aristocratic or contemporary, but represented an enigmatic figure in line with Swiss-Italian culture. Furthermore, it integrated the classic lozenge-shaped logo of SRG SSR, which had been abandoned by other Swiss broadcasters such as SF DRS and TSR. The font used for the idents and bumpers was Helvetica.

== Production ==
The scenes were shot entirely in Canton Ticino, in Switzerland, and the masked character appeared in various contexts, such as castles, houses, mountains and typical scenarios of the region. The soundtrack of these idents and bumpers was composed by Colin Towns, except for the backstage of a 1993 ident, where an instrumental version of the song "Principles of Lust" by Enigma. Furthermore, in 1994, the TSI idents and bumpers were awarded a bronze at Promax & BDA in New Orleans, in the United States, while in 1995 they received from Queen Elizabeth II of the United Kingdom the Queen's Award for Export Achievement.

== Decline and end ==
The "masked troubadour" idents and bumpers were abandoned in 1997, when TSI launched its second channel. In that year, his mask continued to appear in different commercial bumpers and program menus until 1999, when TSI stopped using similar mascots.

== List of idents and bumpers ==
=== Idents ===
- Masked troubadour juggling with three torches
- Masked troubadour coming down the stars (first version)
- Masked troubadour coming down the stairs (second version)
- Masked troubadour going on a boat
- Masked troubadour walking on the battlements of the castle
- Masked troubadour breathing fire
- Masked troubadour doing magic tricks with doves
- Masked troubadour waving the red flag (first version)
- Masked troubadour waving the red flag (second version)

=== Bumpers ===
- Turning mask
- The capital
- Masked troubadour seen from the reflections of the water
- Water on red boots
- Right side of the mask
- The torch
- The red flag
