= Channel 4 idents and presentation =

Channel 4 idents history

Since launching in 1982, British terrestrial television broadcaster Channel 4 has used the same logo consisting of nine differently-shaped blocks forming the numeral '4'. In its history, Channel 4 has been known for using bold and innovative ident packages and has been widely regarded as influential in the television presentation industry.

== The Blocks: 2 November 1982 – 10 October 1996 ==
The original idents for Channel 4 launched on 2 November 1982 and were designed by Martin Lambie-Nairn and his partner Colin Robinson, in association with Bo Gehring Aviation of Los Angeles. While not the first computer-generated idents on British television, they were the first UK channel idents made using advanced computer generation with abstract shapes forming up in multiple ways to create the numeral 4. The Blocks were also the first UK Television ident package, with multiple form-ups for the logo. Before Channel 4, virtually all television stations in the United Kingdom used a single ident to identify the channel.

The music accompanying the ident was called "Fourscore" and was composed by David Dundas; it was later released as a single alongside a B-side, "Fourscore Two", although neither reached the UK charts. On 2 November 1992, "Fourscore" was replaced by new music.

Title	Airdates	Description
Implosion	2 November 1982 – 10 October 1996	The 9 blocks fly and rotate from off-screen, twirling towards the centre of the image to create the numeral '4'.
Explosion	2 November 1982 – 10 October 1996	The 9 blocks fly and rotate away from the centre of the image, flying off-screen. Usually used at closedown by the channel.
Round and Back	2 November 1982 – 10 October 1996	The Numeral 4 comes apart and rotates 360 degrees.
Space Trip	2 November 1982 – 10 October 1996	The blocks dissolve into pieces, flying off the screen, before flying back from the top of the screen to reform the logo.
Space Squad	2 November 1982 – 10 October 1996	Pieces of the blocks fly from the top left of the screen, forming the numeral 4, usually ending with a drum beat.
Interlock	2 November 1982 – 10 October 1996	The blocks form the numeral 4 in layers.

== The Circles: 11 October 1996 – 1 April 1999 ==
On 11 October 1996, Channel 4 commissioned Tomato Films to revamp the "4", which resulted in the "Circles" idents showing four white circles forming transparently over various scenes, with the "4" logo depicted in white in one of the circles, which formed up with a ripple effect, distorting the film. Creation of the idents by Tomato Films is rumoured to have been so difficult, that both Channel 4 and Tomato Films ended the collaboration with only the initial idea of a refreshed logo.

The idents were refreshed on 12 October 1998, with the 4 in a single circle, and the blur effect being simplified, although this was too similar to the look of Channel 5 at the time.

== The Stripes: 2 April 1999 – 30 December 2004 ==
On 2 April 1999, Spin redesigned the logo to feature in a single square which sat on the right-hand side of the screen, whilst various stripes would move along from left to right, often lighting the squared "4" up. Like the previous "Circles" idents from 1996 (which was made by Tomato Films), the initial idents introduced with the stripes would be interspersed with various scenes potentially related to the upcoming programme. A later variation of the package used more abstract interpretations of the initial striped look launched on 1 January 2002.

== The Ambient Blocks era: 31 December 2004 – 29 September 2015 ==
The logo was made three-dimensional again on 31 December 2004 when it was depicted in filmed scenes that show the blocks forming the "4" logo for less than a second before the action moves away again. The Channel 4 logo was altered, with it appearing in trailer stings as being formed in negative space. An updated graphics package was launched with new idents on 22 October 2010. On 3 October 2011, The 'Dubai', ident twisted and turned to introduce the 'Random Acts' strand. Along with 'Flats' ident for the 'Random Acts' strand and 'Tokyo' ident gets the 'Random Acts' treatment.

== The Neo Blocks era: 29 September 2015 – 14 June 2023 ==
=== Initial Look (2015–2017) ===
On 29 September 2015 at 9 pm, the Ambient Blocks were replaced with a new series of idents, directed by Jonathan Glazer, that deconstructed the Channel 4 logo into its constituent elements. During this package, the Channel 4 logo was downplayed on-screen, in favour of bumps and stings featuring the blocks apart, rather than as a formed logo. The four idents featured the blocks as crystalline geodes that are sought after, protected, or studied under a microscope. The heads of Channel 4's in-house creative team stated: "The idents present the blocks as kryptonite-like. They tell the story of their origin and how they impact the world around them. Just as Channel 4 does. It is a story that we shall build on."

=== The Giant (2017–2023) ===
On 31 October 2017 at 8 pm, the initial Glazer designed idents were replaced with a new look by Dougal Wilson, in association with 4Creative, and the MPC Team. This look reconstituted the blocks to form a metallic giant. This ident set featured a newly recorded version of Fourscore, played on acoustic guitar.

== Modern Britain: 14 June 2023 – present ==
From 2 November 2022, elements of the new look were soft launched, being added to the rotation of Channel 4 branding, replacing bumpers and trailer stings with a new set that featured a green (initially white) Channel 4 logo in gradient-coloured 3D spaces. Elements of the new look continued to be added until the official unveiling of the new idents at 18:55 BST on 14 June 2023, with a short film featuring all of the 25 films, narrated with a specially commissioned poem by John Joseph Holt.

Created by 4creative, in collaboration with Art Practice and Love Song. The Channel 4 logo is the central axis of all but two of the scenes that form the idents as the camera continually loops through the logo. The ident package consists of 5 idents, each of which uses five of 25 filmed pieces, produced using a mixture of live action, animation, and CGI. Each identity is linked to a certain theme: Identity, The Land, System, Release and Love.
