= Timeline of the BBC News Channel =

A timeline of notable events relating to the BBC News Channel and its original name BBC News 24.

== 1990s ==
- 1996
  - 9 May – The BBC announces the launch of a rolling news channel for the UK as part of its plans for digital television.
- 1997
  - 9 November – BBC News 24 launches at 5:30 pm. The channel is only available on cable although all viewers are able to sample the channel overnight as BBC News 24 is simulcast during the downtime hours of BBC One.
- 1998
  - Spring – BBC News 24 begins simulcasting overnight news bulletins from BBC World.
  - 1 October – Sky Digital launches and BBC News 24 is carried as part of the new service. This is the first time that satellite viewers are able to see a full-time feed of the BBC's rolling news service.
  - 15 November – The public launch of digital terrestrial TV in the UK takes place and BBC News 24 launches on the new service.
- 1999
  - 25 October – Relaunch of BBC News 24 with a new set design, known as "Cream and red".

== 2000s ==
- 2000
  - 6 April – Click launches as a weekly weekend programme covering the latest developments in the world of technology and the internet.
  - 29 September – The final edition of Breakfast 24 is broadcast ahead of a decision to end separate breakfast programmes for BBC One and News 24.
  - 2 October – The first edition of BBC Breakfast is broadcast, the new morning show on BBC One and News 24 from 6:00 am–9:30 am. (9:00 am on BBC News 24).
- 2001
  - 11 September – The 9/11 attacks occur in the United States and are broadcast live on television. BBC One abandons most regular programming following Neighbours and switches to BBC News 24. This is the first time that BBC One switches to News 24 for coverage of a breaking news story during daytime hours.
- 2002
  - No events.
- 2003
  - 20 March – As the 2003 invasion of Iraq begins BBC News 24 is carried on both BBC One and BBC Two to keep viewers up to date with the latest developments.
  - 8 December – BBC News 24 is relaunched with a new set and titles, as well as a new Breaking News sting. The new look is known as "Clamshell".
- 2004
  - 1 October – Right-of-reply programme Newswatch launches in response to the Hutton Inquiry, as part of an initiative to make BBC News more accountable.
- 2005
  - No events.
- 2006
  - 30 January – The BBC News at Ten begins being simulcast on News 24.
  - 3 April – The BBC News at Five is broadcast for the first time.
  - 10 April – The BBC News at One (with British Sign Language in-vision signing) and BBC News at Six begins being seen on BBC News apart from during breaking news coverage.
  - May – STORYFix is broadcast for the first time. The programmes takes took a mildly satirical view of the week's events – although the satire was aimed more at the way the news was reported than at the news itself.
  - 25 November – The first edition of a new user-generated programme, Your News, is broadcast.
- 2007
  - 22 January – BBC News 24 is relaunched with new titles and new astons, which is an upgraded version of 2003 Clamshell.
  - May – BBC News 24 starts being simulcast on the BBC News website.
  - 27 July – STORYFix is broadcast for the final time, ending because the programme had been seen as being part of a video podcasting trial, and that the production team 'will be moving on to other projects'.
- 2008
  - 21 April – BBC News undergoes a uniform rebrand which costs £550,000, known as the White look. BBC News 24 is renamed BBC News while BBC World is renamed as BBC World News.
  - 20/21 December – The final edition of Your News is broadcast.
- 2009
  - No events.

== 2010s ==
- 2010
  - 31 January – The final 03:00 edition of World News Today airs as five editions are replaced on BBC World News are replaced.
- 2011
  - No events.
- 2012
  - 25 October – Following the completion of digital switchover in the UK, the BBC News Channel is available to all UK households for the first time, almost fifteen years after the channel first launched.
- 2013
  - 18 March – The channel's idents are updated on the same day that BBC News relocates to the refurbished Broadcasting House.
  - March – Business updates are axed as part of the BBC's Delivering Quality First plan.
  - November – The axed business news updates are restored following complaints over their removal.
  - 10 December – BBC News launches a high definition version of the channel.
  - The Papers is broadcast for the first time.
- 2014
  - 14 February – The first edition of The Travel Show is broadcast.
- 2015
  - 7 April – BBC News launches a new two-hour weekday current affairs programme called The Victoria Derbyshire Show. The programme is broadcast on both BBC Two and the BBC News Channel;
  - 1 June – BBC World News programmes Outside Source and Business Live make their debut on the BBC News Channel. They appear as a result of cutbacks which also sees the overnight simulcast of BBC World News beginning an hour earlier at midnight.
  - 6 June – World News Today returns to the weekend schedule of the BBC News Channel for the first time, airing at 9:00.
- 2016
  - February – The BBC News Channel briefly begins showing Newsnight, delayed by 45 minutes from the live BBC Two broadcast.
  - 21 March – The two-hour slot between 11 am and 1 pm on weekdays is relaunched as BBC Newsroom Live.
- 2017
  - January – 100 Days, later rebranded to Beyond 100 Days, launches. Its main focus is on American news and politics and is co-presented from London and Washington.
  - 2 October – The first edition of Afternoon Live is broadcast.
- 2018
  - No events.
- 2019
  - 19 February – Virgin Media removes the standard definition versions of the non-flagship BBC television channels, including BBC News.
  - 15 July – A new set of graphics and fonts are launched. They use the BBC Reith typeface which uses larger text, designed to make it easier for Smartphone and Tablet users to read.

== 2020s ==
- 2020
  - 17 March – The final edition of The Victoria Derbyshire Show is broadcast in order to focus on coverage of the COVID-19 pandemic. The programme had been due to come off air later in 2020 due to funding cuts.
  - The COVID-19 pandemic results in an increase of simulcasts between BBC News and BBC World News with simulcasting now running through the morning (10 am to 1 pm) and the evening (7 pm to 10 pm). UK-only rolling news coverage is restricted to the afternoons. Individually-titled programmes are also suspended in favour of the generic BBC News term.
  - August – The additional simulcasts with BBC World News are made permanent. Consequently, the two channels now simulcast between 10 am and 12 pm each day, as well as from 7 pm to 6 am on weekdays, with opt-outs for BBC News at Ten and for half an hour at 8:30 pm and between 9 pm to 6 am, apart from the evening BBC One bulletin, during the weekend.
- 2021
  - 9 April – At just after midday, Buckingham Palace announces the death of Prince Philip and BBC One, BBC Parliament and BBC World News switch over to BBC News to announce the death. The message was likely received during the top-of-the hour headlines, as the wide-shot in the opening featured multiple journalists running across the room.
- 2022
  - 10 January – A new 60-minute discussion-based programme Context is launched. It broadcasts from Mondays to Thursdays on BBC News and BBC World News and features two guests discussing the day's news.
  - 25 April – The graphics are updated again, featuring the 2021 BBC logo.
  - 14 July – The BBC sets out plans for a new global news channel titled BBC News. It will replace its two existing news services for the UK and overseas. It is scheduled to launch in April 2023.
  - October – The Friday teatime Film Review segment ends after many years.
- 2023
  - 2 January – The BBC News channel airs the final edition of The Papers, its nightly review of the following morning's newspaper headlines. From the following day, discussion of newspaper headlines forms part of its news content. However, the Sunday Morning opt-out from BBC World News remains on-air at 09:30 am
  - 7 January – Ahead of the merger in April, the BBC News Channel stops producing its weekend opt-out from BBC World News between 13:00-19:00 and network news bulletins, apart from Breakfast and Sunday with Laura Kuenssberg, stop being simulcast on the channel.
  - 2 February – The BBC announces that Matthew Amroliwala, Christian Fraser, Yalda Hakim, Lucy Hockings, and Maryam Moshiri will be chief presenters on the BBC’s news channel. However Amroliwala's' Global, Hakim's Impact and Live With Lucy Hockings are not confirmed as staying on air.
  - 6 March – World Business Report begins to be shown on the BBC News Channel as part of extended programme sharing between the channel and BBC World News.
  - 3 April – The BBC News Channel closes as a stand-alone channel. It merges with BBC World News to form a single worldwide news channel called BBC News with programmes based on BBC World News output. However, an ability to break away from international programming for a major UK news story is created. The weekday simulcasts of the BBC One news bulletins and BBC Breakfast continue to be shown and a simulcast of Newsnight is launched.
  - 17 April – Nicky Campbell's BBC Radio 5 Live weekday morning show starts to be simulcast on BBC News. The simulcast is also aired on BBC Two.
  - 22 May – The first new global shows to launch since the UK and global channels were merged begin. Running back-to-back on weekdays between 12-noon and 8 pm, they are BBC News Now, Verified Live and The Daily Global.
  - October – The simulcasting of Nicky Campbell's BBC Radio 5 Live weekday morning show ends to allow for extended live coverage of the Gaza war conflict and when programming returns to normal, the simulcast does not reappear.
- 2024
  - June-17 July – During the run-up to, and for the immediate period after, the 2024 United Kingdom general election, the channel airs continuous UK-focussed content on weekday daytime, with the joint UK/international service restricted to mid-evenings and overnight.
  - 18 July – The weekday daytime UK-separate BBC News Channel service ends following the State Opening of Parliament. It had originally been planned to end immediately after the election but continues for an extra week-and-a-half to cover the latest political stories as the new Government began work. The UK rolling coverage had been broadcast between 9 am and 8 pm.
  - 22 July – It is announced that the 11 pm UK-produced bulletin, which featured during the election campaign, will be made permanent. This means that the news channel will have its first exclusively-produced bulletin for its UK stream since its merger into a global news service last year.
  - 1 October – The UK-only 11 pm news bulletin is replaced by World News America. Consequently, there are, once again, no UK-focused news bulletins for the BBC News Channel.
- 2025
  - 15 January – BBC Breakfast stops being aired during the week, instead the News Channel carries the global news service which, at that time of day, broadcasts rolling news and business reports. Breakfast continues to air on the News Channel at the weekend.
  - 22 March – Click ends after almost exactly 25 years on air. It is replaced the following week by a new technology programme called Tech Now.
  - 26 March – Interview programme HARDtalk ends after 28 years. As with the ending of Click, the programme is being axed as part of the latest cuts and the slots previously occupied by HARDtalk will be replaced by rolling news. HARDtalk had aired several times each day and one, 10.30am, had seen a UK opt-out for UK-specific news. This opt-out ends and is replaced by the global news feed.
  - Spring – The weekday editions of Breakfast return, meaning that, once again, Breakfast is aired on the BBC News Channel every day of the week.
  - 1 August – Another UK-specific programme, Sportsday, ends with the focus shifting to breaking sports news ‘digitally’ - ie online. Consequently, the only News Channel-exclusive UK-orientated sports news bulletin airs on weekdays at 13.30. The BBC News Channel simulcasts the BBC News at One and the sports bulletin is shown when the regional news bulletins are broadcast on BBC One.
  - 29 October – The BBC News Channel, once again, starts to simulcast the international feed during Breakfast.
- 2026
  - 2 February – The BBC News Channel’s periods of live in-vision signing changes to weekdays 8 to 8.30am and during the BBC News at One (excluding Sportsday) and the BBC News at Six. The weekend signing slot remains at 7am.
  - 20 September – BBC Breakfast is aired on the BBC News Channel for the final time. It had only been aired at the weekends.
  - 27 September – Following last week's final Sunday edition of BBC Breakfast, the BBC News Channel now airs on Sundays on BBC One until 9am.
  - 15 October – The BBC News Channel begins broadcasting on YouTube as part of a trial to use the platform "to reach new and younger audiences where they are."

== See also ==
- Timeline of BBC Television News
- BBC News presentation
