= BBC Two "Window on the World" idents =

Set of idents used by BBC Two (2007–2014)

The Seascape ident of the Window on the World ident package

The Window on the World idents were a set of idents used by BBC Two from 18 February 2007 until 13 November 2014. They were created by AMV BBDO and produced by Red Bee Media. The idents featured a number 2 cut out of, or made out of parts of the everyday environment.

== Conception ==
By 2007 BBC Two needed a thorough rebrand as the previous idents were starting to lose their purpose. A new set of idents was therefore commissioned by advertising agency AMV BBDO, and was produced by Red Bee Media, who made the then current idents for BBC One. The new design needed to work, both on television, but also online, as a website and as live streaming feed. The two companies collaborated in all aspects of the process and both contributed people to the process. Paul Brazier, Creative director at AMV and Andy Bryant, Director of Creative at Red Bee Media both were involved in the project, as were Rob Oliver (Art Director, AMV), Chris Bardsley (Writer, AMV), John Golley (Producer, RBM), Joanna Bailey, Michael Geoghegan, Marky, Ian Cross and Stuart Hilton (directors FAQ at Picasso Pictures). On screen presentation was by Paul Mitchell (Chief Designer, RBM) and produced by Lisa Rathband (RBM) with music by Vince Pope from Beetroot and animation was by Picasso Pictures.

Our famous 2 is one of the most recognisable and durable brand images in British media, and this latest evolution takes it into fresh and exciting territory. These new idents embody all of BBC Two's distinctive humour, creativity, playfulness and surprise – and they're also beautifully-executed pieces of film-making in their own right.

— Roly Keating, Controller of BBC Two

The 2007 design had to compare well with its predecessors, and still had to represent BBC Two's programming character and to be an effective promotion of the channel.

AMV has delivered a really clear, simple creative idea with endless possibilities. It expertly captures both the channel's brand values and its personality in a wide range of scenarios that reveal gripping, exciting and exhilarating situations. We were keen to keep the clever, witty and mischievous personality of the 2 but move it into a whole new space. The new channel identity reflects the way that the brand has evolved over the last five years. It has been skilfully brought to life by Red Bee, which has produced the idents and the complementary on-screen presentation system.

— James Pestell, Head of Marketing, BBC Two

The new idents featured a numeral '2' that was largely different from that used by the channel since 2001, despite assurances by James Pestell that the distinctive '2' would stay. The difference is seen as negligible by some, and absolute sacrilege by others.

== Components of look ==
The idents all featured a numeral 2, with a view or scape behind it, as viewers looked through the 2. The new look also featured a new design of BBC Two logo. The previously purple box has now been turned a deep shade of aqua, very similar to the viridian used by the 1991 idents. The text has also been changed, with the "TWO" font being changed to Avenir, from Gill Sans previously. This box was placed to the left of the 2 numeral, opposite to where it was in the previous look, and faded in at the end of the ident. Once again, no clock accompanied the look, and appears to have been abandoned by the BBC. Promotions began with clips of the programme, before the clips were encompassed inside a 2, as it moved back to the endslide, featuring programme name and BBC Two box logo on the left with a full size 2 on the right through which the clips can still be seen. This theme also existed with the breakdown slide, with clips being used from the Seascape ident. Programme stills also still existed, despite being restricted to the schools programming on early mornings, and featured an enlarged middle section of '2' with the top and bottom not visible, off screen, with the programme picture in this large 2 shape.

== Refresh ==
The Window on the World idents have had three branding refreshes: October 2008, June 2009 and March 2013.

=== October 2008 ===
The October 2008 refresh was not openly marketed and was unnoticed, except for those eagle eyed few. The refresh would have seen a number of the idents dropped, and the BBC Two logo dropped in favour of the BBC logo in the bottom right corner of the 2. The look was launched on 1 October 2008, and was only seen twice: Sunroof at 6 am that day, and Seascape later that evening prior to night time programming at 12.50 on 2 October 2008. This new refresh was stopped for internal reasons, and the BBC has never explained this.

=== June 2009 ===
The June refresh was by far more successful than the last. This refresh resulted in a number of the idents being dropped and a new style for continuity adopted. The new promotion style involved the endboard design being changed to a large 2, tilted at an angle and filling the left half of the screen with programme information and BBC Two logo on the right of the screen. The most striking thing about these endboards was the bright colour palette used. The end boards could be any colour of the spectrum, however are generally bright fluorescent colours with some programming featuring dark grey endboards. Now and next boards also featured the new style, but using mainly, the same blue as the box logo, and featuring videos from the idents in the slanted 2. This colour was also the main colour used by nations and regions. The breakdown slide was also modified (albeit with apparent haste) to the new style and programme slides were also transferred with both featuring the deep blue of the logo as the only variant.

The idents themselves were also changed, with some dropped (namely ones where the '2' did not stay intact and full on screen), and the remaining idents altered so that the BBC Two logo was transferred to the right of the 2, and was present at the beginning of the ident, but faded out before the end.

=== March 2013 ===
A second refresh took place to coincide with the launch of BBC Two HD, replacing the BBC HD channel. All idents were updated with new soundtracks, with some even having two or three different versions. Three of the idents (Mirror, Seascape and Tent) feature songs from alt-J. Many also lost the sound effects which went along with them. The "Window on the World" idents were phased out on 13 November 2014 following the return of the 1990s idents in July that year.

== Idents ==
=== Regular ===
Title	Air dates	Description
Cappuccino	18 February 2007 – 17 June 2009	A paper with a 2 cut out is held over a cup, while chocolate pieces are sprinkled on top. The paper is then removed, so we can see, albeit through the stencil, that there is now a chocolate 2 atop a cappuccino. This ident was the first to be shown at 10:00am. There were two variants to this ident. The formed up is the same, but in one the 2 is disturbed by the drinker dropping in two sugar cubes, and the other by the drinker scooping the froth off of the top.
Chase	18 February 2007 – 17 June 2009	A man is being chased through some woods by a number of men with dogs. He looks around and hides in a various places involving 2's. There are five variations of this ident. The first, we see the man falling just site of a rock with a 2 in it. He then gets up and runs off to the right of the 2 and out of sight. Viewers then see the man chasing him run by, and as the camera moves, we see the man hiding behind the tree. Another involves a wood with a 2 hole in it. The man chased flees up underneath this 2, jumping on top and hiding out of site from below. A third involves the man diving down a 2 shaped hole in rock shelf and hiding as we see has captors continue by jumping over the hole. He then emerges to run back again. The fourth involves the man hiding behind a rock with a small 2 cut in the top, allowing us to see his captors getting ever closer. The last is shot in daytime and features our man running towards the 2 cut in the rock, running through it and turning away as his pursuers follow. The soundtrack in all is the same beat on drums, similar to bongo drums.
Mirror	18 February 2007 – 13 November 2014	A drop slides down a mirror in the shape of a 2, and as the camera pans out we can see that the mirror is attached to the side of a car as it moves at speed down highways unknown. Originally there were two versions of this, both featuring different road scenes and different soundtracks. The original version features a slow piano piece and is used to link into serious programming. The other is a more light hearted, up beat version. The soundtrack since the 2013 refresh is "Fitzpleasure" by alt-J. It was retired on 13 November 2014 following the return of the 1990s idents. As well, a sting exists. During the June 2009 refresh, this ident is the only one, where the logo fades in at the end.
Seascape	18 February 2007 – 13 November 2014	A shot of the sea than pans back, through a large 2 shaped hole in the sea defences, with the sea breaking all around the hole. After the 2013 refresh, there were two variants of Seascape, both featuring different soundtracks. The soundtrack of one variant was "Intro" by alt-J. Used to introduce news programs. This ident, along with the other idents in the package, was phased out on 13 November 2014. As well, a sting exists.
Sunroof	18 February 2007 – 13 November 2014	A shot of the leaves on a tree through a seemingly ordinary sunroof. The camera rotates round as the roof opens to reveal the sun roof is in fact a lot larger, and is the shape of a 2. An alternative version was produced to promote Wonders of the Solar System, in which the view through the sunroof is of a starry night sky. This variant was sometimes used for programmes with a space or specifically night-time theme. This ident, along with the other idents in the package, was phased out on 13 November 2014.
Tent	18 February 2007 – 13 November 2014	A zip on yellow fabric is followed as it unzips a large 2 shaped door to a tent, revealing a scene outside. There are three versions of this ident, all having different scenery. The first is of a polar landscape, and our owner is wearing large thick furs and coats. Another features a beach in the sunset with some friends sitting around a campfire. The final one looks out onto a festival, with tents as far as the eye can see. The soundtrack is different with each version: the beach version had a guitar version, the festival version featuring an electric guitar version with a high tempo and friendly feel, with the polar version of a slow tempo version, similar to the festival. A fourth version showed a starry night sky through the opening and was used for space or night-themed programming. The soundtrack on the Explorer variant, after the 2013 refresh, was "Something Good" by alt-J. The Festival variant was withdrawn during the March 2013 refresh. This ident, along with the other idents in the package, was phased out on 13 November 2014. A sting exists for the Festival variant.
Zoetrope	18 February 2007 – 13 November 2014	A futuristic city scape of flying cars and high glass buildings pans out to reveal it is a zoetrope, with 2's on the outside edge that you look through. A short clip was used as the opening sting on BBC iPlayer from launch until 13 November 2014, where it was phased out along with the other idents in the package.
Tagging – Football	18 March 2007 – 26 March 2013	The tagging idents are some of the most controversial in the station's history. A somewhat juddery look through a stencil as a man runs up on a football ground, sprays a 2 on a football in pink spray paint before panning up to see the angry players chasing the person off the screen.
Tagging – Policeman	18 March 2007 – 17 June 2009	Similar to the football tagging ident, a man with stencil runs up behind a policeman dealing with some disturbance and sprays a black 2 stencil on his back, before running back across the road.
Tagging – Gallery	18 March 2007 – 17 June 2009	Similar to those above, a man with a stencil, first checks to see that the gallery attendant isn't watching, before spraying a fluorescent green 2 on the wall in an art gallery. The attendant notices and the man is chased out the building.
Tagging – Skate	18 March 2007 – 17 June 2009	Once again similar to the last few, now in a skate park, dodging a number of youths on skateboards. A 2 is added to an already heavily graffitied wall.

=== Special ===
As well as this set of idents, some special ones were made for Christmas and for other programmes. The Christmas idents are below:

- Christmas 2007 - A magic sprite and a paper origami theme here. A blue sprite runs around white and light brown papers depicting trees, animals and other festive creatures. There were two variations, both on the same theme, these aired for the last time for Christmas 2010.
- Christmas 2008 - The ident from the previous year was used.
- Christmas 2009 - The ident from the previous year was used, albeit with the logo on the right.
- Christmas 2010 - The ident from the previous year was used, albeit with the logo disappearing before the end of the sequence.
- Christmas 2011 - A new ident debuted, in four variations: Snowman, Inventor Lady, Moon/Sun and Turkey For example, in Moon/Sun a model moon appears with a sun emerging from it. In all versions, the camera moves down, revealing a village which, as the camera pans out reveals the village being a giant (if largely deformed) 2. The logo appears at the end in a white box. There were four variations based on this theme which were used initially until Christmas 2014 before returning for Christmas 2017.
- Christmas 2012 - The idents from the previous year were used.
- Christmas 2013 - The idents from 2011 were used, like the previous year.
- Christmas 2014 - The idents from the previous year was used despite the main package having been phased out earlier that year.
- Christmas 2015 - The ident from the previous year was used, albeit with the soundtrack replaced by carollers singing the word "two" over and over again to the tune of "Carol of the Bells". Only one variant, Turkey, was used. The 2000, 2001 and 2002 idents were also used, again with the soundtrack replaced by carollers singing "two" to "Jingle Bells", "Ding Dong Merrily on High" and "Deck the Halls" respectively.
- Christmas 2016 - The idents from the previous year were used, albeit with new soundtracks of soundalikes singing various carols, this time with words intact.
- Christmas 2017 - The idents from Christmas 2011 were used, albeit with the soundtrack heard the previous year.

Some specific programme idents are shown below, some of which didn't have the logo in them:

- Heroes - A 2 with backlighting similar to the eclipse in the show.
- The Restaurant - A white porcelain 2 on a sideboard which has food thrown at it.
- Thursdays Are Funny - A comedy strand involving a 2 made up of white and orange lines on a black background. There are a number of variants on the same theme.
- Electric Proms 2007 - A number of neon style lines at the bottom of the screen that bend to form a 2.
- Electric Proms 2008 - A 2 made out of bended neon style lines.
- Torchwood - The ident begins with Zoetrope or Tent Arctic, but while it pans out, the screen loses signal, which is replaced with the Torchwood logo and scenes from the series.
- White Season - A black screen with white writing, scratches and other marks, pans out to form a 2.
- Back to Nature - A 2 cut out of a log of wood is seen in a number of different scenes including a river, clearing and waterfall.
- Titanic - A man can be seen working on the Titanic, as the camera zooms out through a 2-shaped hole. This ident was only used in Northern Ireland and was used mostly for rugby matches. This ident was retired on 13 November 2014 due to the resurrection of the 1990s idents. The ident reused music from Copper Cut Out ident from the 1990s, with the end of the ident being a nod to the aforementioned ident.
- Winter Olympics 2014 - Similar to the Tents idents, this one opens up to a wintry background through the 2-shaped opening. First aired on 6 February 2014 just before the live coverage of the Opening ceremony and last aired just before the closing ceremony.
- 50 Years - A set of stings and idents to commemorate the 50th birthday of BBC Two. In Cake, the 2 scrapes bits off a birthday cake off, and in Sneeze, the 2, via a sneeze, blows a selection of photos from various shows throughout the channel's history off the wall, with the song It Takes Two as the soundtrack. Another scene entitled Karaoke shows the 2 singing (actually a rubber duck's squeak) It Takes Two and I Will Survive. Meanwhile in Memories, to "Spring" from Vivaldi's The Four Seasons, we see a selection of photos from various BBC Two shows past and present to begin, before we see the 2 looking around the room in a looped sequence. Extended versions of the Cake, Memories and Karaoke (I Will Survive) stings were also used as idents leading into programmes shortly after the stings were introduced. Various 2s from previous idents (the English 2 teapot, the Predator 2, the porcelain homes 2 and the Armstrongs 2, as well as a leafy 2 possibly referencing the Garden ident) also appear. The channel logo presents itself as a 3D cube, one side having "50 YEARS" written on it. Various idents from the 1991–2001 set are also shown, updated to include the special cube logo.

== Criticisms ==
There have been a few criticisms of the look. The tagging idents have been some of the most controversial in the channel's history. The juddery camera work and shoddy appearance made it appear as though it was shot on a camcorder and done by an amateur. These idents were all dropped, except Football that remained in use until the 2013 refresh.

Another controversial issue is that of the 2009 redesigned endboards. Their basic design itself is would've been criticised at the time, but the main cause of concern is the highly colourful appearance. The colours are highly fluorescent with few programmes using darker colours. The light colours are widely used, regardless of programme, which means promotions for Newsnight may be in bright yellow. This lack of concern for colour has caused outrage at the inappropriate nature of some of the colours.

== See also ==
- BBC Two "Personality" idents
- BBC One "Circle" idents
- History of BBC television idents

Preceded by Personality 2s	BBC television idents 18 February 2007 – 13 November 2014	Succeeded by 1991–2001 2s (second run)
