= Daniel Barber (director) =

British director

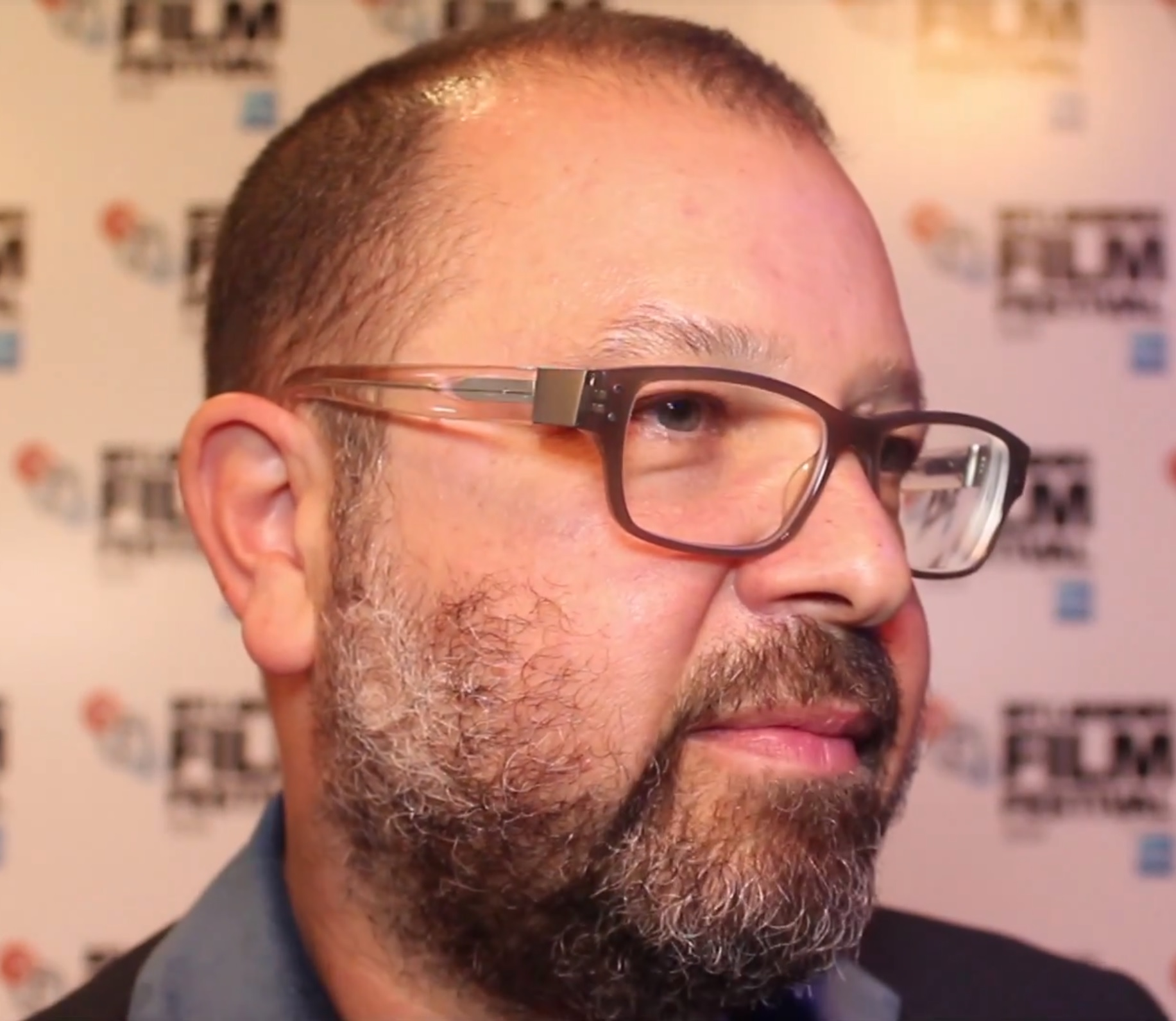
- Barber at the UK premiere of The Keeping Room in 2014
- Born: 1965 (age 60–61); London, United Kingdom
- Education: St Martins School of Art
- Occupation: Film director

Daniel Barber (born 1965) is a British director. Having begun his career as director of commercials, he was nominated for an Academy Award in 2008 for his short film The Tonto Woman. In 2009 he directed Michael Caine in Harry Brown.

== Early life and education ==
Daniel Barber was born in 1965 in London. He studied graphic design at St Martins School of Art, where he graduated in 1988.

== Career ==
Barber joined the TV department at Lambie-Naim & Co, where he designed and directed title sequences, including those for the BBC Nine O'Clock News. In 1991, he completed new identities for BBC1 and BBC2, for which he won a BAFTA and a D&AD award.

In 1993, he joined Rose Hackney Productions, where he directed commercials full-time, and he also directed the idents and bumpers of the masked troubadour for TSI. His work was showcased at the Cannes International Advertising Festival and in 1994, he was named as a Creative Face of the Future by Campaign magazine and as one of the UK's "Hotshot" commercial directors. By 1995, he became a partner and Rose Hackney became Rose Hackney Barber. He has won many of awards for his commercials both in Europe and the United States.

In 2006, Barber became a partner at London-based film production company Knucklehead, where he continued to direct commercials, including for Adidas, Audi, the BBC, Estée Lauder, Sony, BMW, and the Royal Air Force.

Barber's first film was The Tonto Woman, a 35-minute western based on a short story by Elmore Leonard. The film is about a cattle rustler who becomes involved in the life of a woman who has been held captive by Mojave Indians for the past 11 years and is now living in isolation. The film won Best Film at Palm Springs 2007, Best of Festival at LA Shorts 2008 and was nominated for an Oscar in 2008.

He directed his first full-length feature, Harry Brown, starring Michael Caine, who plays a widowed ex-marine whose retirement is disrupted when a gang of vicious thugs take over his neighbourhood and murder his best friend. Described as a modern urban western, it reflects the stark realities of youth crime in the 21st century. It had its world premiere as a Special Presentation at the 2009 Toronto International Film Festival and was received with standing ovations. The film was released theatrically on 11 November 2009 at the Odeon Leicester Square.

== Personal life ==
Barber was married to Sandra Barber, who died of cancer in 2015.

== Filmography ==
- The Tonto Woman (2007)
- Harry Brown (2009)
- The Keeping Room (2014)
