= Joplin Sibtain =

English actor (born 1969)

- Born: 1969 (age 56–57); London, England
- Other name: Chook Sibtain
- Occupation: Actor
- Years active: 2000–present

Joplin Sibtain, sometimes credited professionally as Chook Sibtain, is a British actor known for the Netflix series Safe, his seasons at the National Theatre and as Tarak Ital on the Doctor Who special, "The Waters of Mars". He voiced Olin in Horizon Zero Dawn. He won best actor at the New York Movie awards for the title role in Memory Man, and starred as Brasso in the Star Wars television series Andor.

== Biography ==
Sibtain was born in Waltham Forest, London in 1969 to an English mother Mary, who named him after Janis Joplin, and an Arab father. The couple separated when Sibtain was young, and subsequently he was raised by his mother.

Sibtain won a scholarship and attended the Webber Douglas Academy of Dramatic Art. He has performed in theatres including the Royal Shakespeare Company and the National Theatre. In the 1990s he played the role of the masked troubadour, who made himself appear in the idents and the commercial bumpers of the Swiss Italian-language television channel TSI produced by Lambie-Nairn. He is known for playing various film and television roles including Mickey, opposite Nick Nolte in Head Full Of Honey, Neil Chahal in the Netflix series Safe and Tarak Ital in Doctor Who.

Furthermore, Sibtain has been cast in roles such as Brasso in Andor and Jon Roxton in House of the Dragon.

== Selected filmography ==
Film
| Year | Film | Role | Notes |
|---|---|---|---|
| 2000 | The Stretch | Richard Asher | as Chook Sibtain |
| 2012 | Tom Clancy's Ghost Recon: Alpha | Robert "Pepper" Bonifacio | as Chook Sibtain; Short film |
| 2018 | Head Full of Honey | Mickey | |
| 2022 | I Used to Be Famous | Dave | |
| 2025 | The Strangers – Chapter 2 | Billy Bufford | |
Television
| Year | Title | Role | Notes |
| 2000 | EastEnders | Jack Robbins | 15 episodes as Chook Sibtain |
| 2002 | Bad Girls | Naj Khan Din | as Chook Sibtain; Episode: "Curtain Call" |
| 2002–2008 | Doctors | Matt Brown & 3 other characters | 10 episodes as Chook Sibtain |
| 2003 | Grease Monkeys | Deep | as Chook Sibtain; Episode: "Grease Monkeys" |
| 2005 | Footballers' Wives | Surjit | as Chook Sibtain; Episode: "Episode #4.5" |
| 2005 | Where the Heart Is | Gary | as Chook Sibtain; Episode: "Together" |
| 2006 | The Bill | Chris Dalton | as Chook Sibtain; Episode: "413: Up Against the Wall" |
| 2006 | Holby City | Eddie McGuire | 2 episodes as Chook Sibtain |
| 2007 | The Sarah Jane Adventures | Mark Grantham | 2 episodes as Chook Sibtain |
| 2009 | Robin Hood | Isabella's Guard | as Chook Sibtain; Episode: "The Enemy of My Enemy" |
| 2009 | Doctor Who | Tarak Ital | as Chook Sibtain; Episode: "The Waters of Mars" |
| 2011 | Hustle | Lloyd/Danush Larijani | as Chook Sibtain; Episode: "Benny's Funeral" |
| 2018 | Vera | Naz Ahmed | Episode: "Blood and Bone" |
| 2018 | Marcella | Nick | Episode: "Episode #2.1" |
| 2018 | Hard Sun | DS Herbie Sarafian | 6 episodes as Chook Sibtain |
| 2018 | Safe | Neil Chahal | 8 episodes |
| 2022 | Monster Ships (TV series) | Narrator | 8 episodes |
| 2022–2025 | Star Wars: Andor | Brasso | 9 episodes |
| 2023 | Death in Paradise | Charlie Banks | 1 episode |
| 2026 | House of the Dragon | Jon Roxton | Main role; 7 episodes |
Video games
| Year | Title | Role | Notes |
| 2017 | Horizon Zero Dawn | Olin | as Chook Sibtain; Voice |
| 2017 | Star Wars Battlefront II | —N/a | as Chook Sibtain; Voice |
| 2021 | Necromunda: Hired Gun | The Shadow / Orlocks | Voice |
| 2021 | The Ascent | stackBoss Poone | Voice |
| 2022 | Triangle Strategy | Sorsley | Voice |
| 2022 | Lego Star Wars: The Skywalker Saga | —N/a | Voice |
| 2022 | A Plague Tale: Requiem | Milo | Voice |
