= Station identification =

Practice of radio and television stations and networks

Station identification (ident, network ID, channel ID or bumper) is the practice of radio and television stations and networks identifying themselves on-air, typically by means of a call sign or brand name (sometimes known, particularly in the United States, as a "sounder", "stinger" or "sting", more generally as a station or network ID). This may be to satisfy requirements of licensing authorities, a form of branding, or a combination of both. As such, it is closely related to production logos, used in television and cinema alike.

Station identification used to be done regularly by an announcer at the halfway point during the presentation of a television program, or in between programs.

== Europe ==
Broadcast stations in Europe are not identified by a callsign (with the digital age, most networks share one or two metropolitan transmitting facilities within a certain region, making identification of the actual transmitter superfluous); however, most networks use a brand based on their common channel number. A form of station identification clip is played between programmes, traditionally incorporating the channel's logo, and accompanied by a continuity announcer that introduces the next programme (and promotes other programmes). These identifiers evolved from mainly being mechanical models (such as the BBC globe), to becoming more advanced through the evolution of CGI during the 1980s. From the 1960s to the 1990s, most broadcasters only used a single identifier, sometimes using special variations for holidays and special events. In the present day, most broadcasters use a set of multiple identifiers built around a particular theme or branding element, often based on the channel's current overall look.

Prior to 1988, the two existing channels in the Netherlands, Nederland 1 and Nederland 2, used only the idents of the broadcasters airing on them. With the creation of Nederland 3, all three channels started using their own idents.

A well-known example of idents in Europe are those featuring the masked troubadour played by British actor Joplin Sibtain, which were broadcast on the Swiss TV channel TSI in the 1990s.

== North America ==
=== Mexico ===
The Ley Federal de Telecomunicaciones y Radiodifusión enacted in 2014 does not include a requirement for regular on-air station identification. However, many stations continue to air twice an hour their call letters (in Spanish) along with their city of license, as was required previously under Article 76 of the Ley Federal de Radio y Televisión.

=== United States ===
The United States' Federal Communications Commission (FCC) enforces specific requirements for identification that must be followed by all terrestrial radio and television stations. Stations must, when they sign on, sign off, and as close to the top of each hour as feasibly possible (such as within a "natural break" in programming, like a commercial break), present a visual (television) or aural (radio) station identification that contains, at minimum, the station's callsign, followed by its designated city of license. As a courtesy, top-of-hour identifications may also contain additional information, such as frequencies and a declaration of the station's ownership. Only the name of the licensee, the station's frequency or channel number as stated on its license, and/or network affiliations, may be inserted between the call letters and station location. An example of declared ownership on KTLA in Los Angeles during the late 1970s were the local announcer invoking then-station owner Golden West Broadcasters ("Golden West Broadcasters-Channel 5, KTLA Los Angeles"). For many years, many television stations demonstrate the station identification for other reasons, including delivering public service announcements, addressing community bulletin boards, or whenever a station experiences technical difficulties.

Stations which broadcast on additional full- or low-powered signals must also identify them all every hour. However, stations licensed as translators must be identified in their own right only three times per day: once between 7 and 9 a.m., 12:55 and 1:05 p.m., and 4 and 6 p.m. FCC rules specify that additional communities a station serves may also be listed in a legal ID, but the official city of license must always be listed first. The advent of broadcast automation has made it much easier for broadcasters to ensure compliance with identification rules. Many television stations and radio stations may have their identifications prerecorded or programmed to play automatically at the appropriate times. It may also be monetized into an advertisement, with the station placing the required text into a quick ad spot where an advertiser such as a law firm sponsors a program with their slogan said.

==== Radio ====
On radio, the top-of-hour ID must contain the full, legal call sign (including any relevant suffixes, particularly "FM") as assigned by the FCC, followed immediately by the station's community of license. The call letters must be spoken individually; even if the call letters are pronounced as a word for branding purposes (such as WHAM in Rochester, New York, which is spoken as "Wham"), the legal ID must still spell out the individual letters. An example of a proper spoken radio station identification in the United States would be "WMAS-FM Enfield Springfield" or "WLAN-FM Lancaster". Often, these identifications may be artificially pitch shifted to be faster, to fit in more advertising or promotion within the sequence.

The FCC also allows that: "the name of the licensee, the station's frequency, the station's channel number, as stated on the station's license, and/or the station's network affiliation may be inserted between the call letters and station location".

==== Television ====
Racine, Wisconsin's WBME-TV identifies their three broadcast signals as of August 2008; the station's former subchannel broadcast on WDJT-TV digital channel 58.3, the former analog signal on UHF channel 49, and their digital broadcast on UHF channel 17 (formerly channel 48), which maps to virtual channel 49. Note that using the channel numbers in an identification is not a requirement.

On television, station identification may occur in either a visual format or aural. As no audio announcement of the call sign is necessary if the information appears on screen, often the identification is fulfilled by incorporating it into a short promo for a program the station airs (such as a syndicated or network program, or a preview of an upcoming newscast), the title sequence of the station's newscasts, or automatically cued as a digital on-screen graphic briefly displayed at the required time. The identification can even be monetized as part of a regular commercial, with the text appearing in small type on the bottom of the screen (for instance, a law firm can sponsor a court show and directly lead into the beginning of a program with proper station identification, along with their ad). Translators are required to be identified and listed daily at 9 a.m. and 3 p.m. local time.

FCC rules developed for analog television required that translators identify themselves individually. The transition to digital television made this a more challenging rule to implement technically and economically.

In a 2004 order the FCC suspended identification requirements for LPTV and translator stations:

Although we recognize the value of the ITU provisions for station identification, we conclude that we cannot at this time establish identification requirements for digital LPTV and TV translator stations, nor do we believe it would be appropriate to attempt to "bootstrap" our current analog identification requirements for digital station operations. The record in this proceeding lacks sufficient technical and cost information from which to develop standards for this purpose. We do not wish to impose requirements that could now be cost prohibitive for licensees of translator and LPTV stations, thereby discouraging their conversion to digital operation.

As of July 2022, the FCC is proposing to reinstate identification requirements for LPTV and translator stations.

The advent of digital television originally made it necessary for stations simulcasting both their analog and digital on the same channel to include both call signs in all identifications. Both stations have the same base callsigns, with the only difference being the analog ending in "-TV" and digital ending in "-DT" (originally "-HD"). Low-power stations identify with the designator "-LD". After the June 2009 digital transition, stations had a one time opportunity offered by the FCC to either retain the -DT designation on their digital signal, or move over the analog calls with either the "-TV" suffix or no suffix if so identified. Additionally, a station could add the "-TV" suffix to their calls for standardization purposes among broadcast groups, even if those calls were not shared by an AM or FM radio station. PSIP also continuously carries the station's ID digitally encoded.

==== Digital subchannels ====
Digital subchannels usually identify themselves in one of two ways, with a limit of seven characters in the PSIP tag:

- By first providing the call letters, followed by the main channel number, and then the subchannel broken up by either a dot or a dash. For example, "WXXX 2.3" or "WXXX 2–3".
- The station may identify the channel as a certain stream by placing the subchannel number after the "-DT" designation within the callsign, as in "WXXX-DT3" for that station's third subchannel.

In addition, subchannels which carry weather information – such as those carrying a still of their weather radar, AccuWeather, or a weather feed created by the station itself – may identify that channel via their PSIP flag with the non-standard "WX" suffix, as in "WXXX-WX", though they must be identified by their subchannel number in on-air identifications. Some subchannels may also display only the name of the network it is affiliated with in the PSIP flag rather than the station's calls.

The former two standards are voluntary and interchangeable, and the station can choose to identify all the channels by only the base callsign, although they are encouraged to differentiate each channel from the primary channel (or for LP/Class A analog-only stations digitally airing as a subchannel on a sister or LMA partner station). The primary channel usually does not use a .1/-1 or -DT1 suffix to identify itself beyond some PBS member stations such as the stations of Milwaukee PBS, and minor broadcasters which sell subchannel space to other broadcasters for their own brokered programming. More robust electronic program guide data provided by a smart TV manufacturer or system (such as Roku's backend TV firmware) via a broadband connection can be provided outside the PSIP stream to identify the station, but is not considered a legal station identification on its own.

==== Identification on other types of signals ====
In the United States, the policy on radio identification depends on the service. Station identification is usually done in the station's standard mode of operation, though the FCC considers Morse code identification to be universally acceptable no matter what mode the station is operating in.

Low-power (Part 15 in the U.S.) stations do not always identify, being unlicensed (this would be essentially impossible for small FM transmitters for consumer use, such as those used to broadcast music from an MP3 player to a car radio), but those that run as community-based radio stations (including college stations using carrier current) usually do. Station identification in that case usually consists of the station's name, frequency, and a slogan; unlicensed stations are not allowed to use formal call signs.

International shortwave broadcasters usually do not use callsigns, instead giving the name of the service and the location of the home office, and occasionally the frequencies that the current broadcast is being transmitted on. There are a few exceptions, particularly in the United States, the time station WWV being a prime example.

Amateur radio requires the call sign to be stated at the end of a communication and every ten minutes during (some hams use countdown clocks to remind them to identify); modes such as packet radio and fast-scan television often have a provision for automatic identification, either including it as part of a digital data stream or overlaying it over an analog picture. Repeaters are often designed to automatically transmit the repeater's callsign, usually in Morse code. The requirements for the United States are covered in Title 47 of the Code of Federal Regulations, part 97.119.

Land mobile two-way (including public safety and business mobile) require station identifications by call sign. In the case of the GMRS service, this is to be done by each station in a similar manner to the amateur practice, though the time limit is fifteen minutes. Repeater systems used in both the land mobile and amateur radio services often have provisions for announcing the repeater's call sign, either in voice or Morse code.

Citizen's Band radio no longer maintains a requirement for station or transmission identification, but operators are "encouraged to identify" transmissions using one of the following: a previously assigned callsign, "K" prefix followed by operator initials and residence zip code, operator's name, or "organizational description including name and any applicable operator unit number." The use of a "handle" (nickname) is encouraged by CB rule 17 only in conjunction with these methods, not by itself. Most CB operators prefer to use self-assigned handles reflecting some aspect of their personality; it is generally considered a breach of CB etiquette to use real names, even that of the user.

Family Radio Service and Multi-Use Radio Service have no station identification requirement, though groups of individual users have their own procedures, such as using license plates or informal callsigns (some groups within the Boy Scouts of America, for example, use the troop number followed by the scout's initials as a callsign).

Wi-Fi access points are not required by law to identify (they are unlicensed transmitters) but the Wi-Fi standards include provision for an identifier called an SSID, which is transmitted as a routine part of Wi-Fi network traffic. However, since a number of standard Wi-Fi channels are shared with the amateur radio spectrum, amateur radio-operated High Speed Multimedia (HSMM), or "hinternet", access points usually use the call sign of the control operator as the SSID, this suffices as proper station identification for the access point being operated as an amateur radio transceiver.

===== Digital broadcasting and FM translators for AM stations =====
With the advent of digital radio, station identification becomes more complicated, because more than one audio stream can be part of the same station. Stations broadcasting HD Radio feeds identify by their stream channel, and unlike television, the HD1 channel (which in the vast majority of cases, carries the same program as the analog signal) is included in the identification (for example, "WXSS-HD1, Wauwatosa/Milwaukee", "98.3, WZRL-HD1, Plainfield/Indianapolis" or "WCBS-FM-HD1, New York City"). AM stations which simulcast via an FM HD subchannel identify both the main stream and the HD stream, and if broadcasting in HD Radio format in AM, also list that as part of the identification (for example, "WISN HD, Milwaukee, and WRNW-HD2, Milwaukee", or "WINS and WINS-FM-HD1, New York"). The same is done for AM stations airing on an FM translator, though the identification is flexible on whether the AM station or translator is mentioned first; for instance, WCLB in Sheboygan, Wisconsin (before taking on an agreement in January 2024 to simulcast WGXI) preferred to brand using the FM translator rather than their maligned AM signal, thus their identification was said as "107.3 FM, W297CK, and 950 AM, WCLB, Sheboygan".

The FCC clarified what is required in these cases:

§ 73.1201 Station Identification.

(b) Content. (1) Official station identification shall consist of the station's call letters immediately followed by the community or communities specified in its license as the station's location; Provided, That the name of the licensee, the station's frequency, the station's channel number, as stated on the station's license, and/or the station's network affiliation may be inserted between the call letters and station location. DTV stations, or DAB Stations, choosing to include the station's channel number in the station identification must use the station's major channel number and may distinguish multicast program streams. For example, a DTV station with major channel number 26 may use 26.1 to identify an HDTV program service and 26.2 to identify an SDTV program service. A radio station operating in DAB hybrid mode or extended hybrid mode shall identify its digital signal, including any free multicast audio programming streams, in a manner that appropriately alerts its audience to the fact that it is listening to a digital audio broadcast. No other insertion between the station's call letters and the community or communities specified in its license is permissible.

== Oceania ==
=== Australia ===
Station identification in Australia is not limited to the designated common or on-air name of the station or network affiliation, both for radio and television.

A radio station may have call letters related to its town or district name, and the company name; for example, Charters Towers, Queensland station 4CHT and Ceduna Community Radio Inc's 5CCR in Ceduna, South Australia. The station may have a name-callsign completely different from its licensed callsign, such as Wollongong, New South Wales station 2UUL, which is branded on-air as "Wave FM".

A television station usually associates with its network; for example, the Regional Television Queensland station RTQ is known as WIN Television (itself associated with the larger Nine Network), and WIN's original station at Wollongong bears the callsign WIN.

== Digital on-screen graphics and teletext ==
Teletext, an information service provided by many broadcasters, provides station or network identification in many countries worldwide. As almost all modern sets can display this information, it is a simple matter of checking teletext if the identity of the station is not clear. Some broadcasters do not provide a teletext service, and there is no specific requirement or standard for station identification in it. While teletext is widespread in Europe and is closely associated with the PAL television system worldwide, it was non-existent in North America during the analog television era, in which the NTSC standard was used. However, digital television standards generally include station identification.

A common worldwide practice is to use a small overlay graphic known as a Digital on-screen graphic (DOG), "bug" or watermark created by a character generator in the corner of the screen, showing the logo of the channel. While not a substitute for proper station identification, this makes it easy to identify the station at a glance. VH1 originated the practice in the United States around 1993, with most other cable networks following until most started using them in the early 2000s.

Amateur television operators (and also, news channels in other countries) often use a lower third or bug containing their callsign in lieu of voice identification. This is an accepted practice in the United States and United Kingdom.

== See also ==
- Automatic Transmitter Identification System (television)
- Clock ident

Specific networks

- ABS-CBN § Branding
- American Broadcasting Company § Visual identity
- BBC television idents
- CBS § Branding
- Domo-kun
- GMA Network § Slogans
- Hato no kyūjitsu
- ITV television idents
- Leo the Lion (MGM)
- NBC logo
- PBS § Visual identity
