= RSI La 1 =

RSI LA 1
- Logo used since 2012
- Country: Switzerland

Programming
- Language: Italian
- Picture format: 720p HDTV (downscaled to 576i for the SD feed)

Ownership
- Owner: Radiotelevisione Svizzera di lingua Italiana
- Sister channels: RSI La 2

History
- Launched: 18 November 1958
- Former names: TSI (1958–1997); TSI 1 (1997–2009)

Links
- Website: la1.rsi.ch

Availability

Terrestrial
- Digital: ~~DVB-T~~ (ceased on 3 June 2019)

RSI LA 1 (la uno, formerly TSI 1) is one of two television channels produced by Radiotelevisione Svizzera di lingua Italiana for the Italian-speaking community of Switzerland. LA 1, which can be received in all parts of the country, is a generalist channel with a schedule encompassing news, entertainment, drama, cinema films, documentaries, and sport.

From 1993 to 1997 the British graphic design company Lambie-Nairn produced for LA 1 the idents and the commercial bumpers of the masked troubadour, who was played by the British actor Joplin Sibtain.

As well as being transmitted digitally throughout the Confederation, LA 1's programmes are also receivable on cable and encoded, via satellite. Until February 28, 2009, the station was called TSI 1, and before that (before TSI 2 went on air) RTSI. RSI LA1 has also been broadcast in HD since February 29, 2012.

On June 5, 2017, the network underwent a graphical overhaul of its bumper ads. In December 2018, another (partial) overhaul of the bumpers took place: the background music and video were modified.

On September 2, 2019, with the start of the new 2019-2020 television season, the network, along with RSI LA2, underwent a graphical overhaul of its bumper ads; the same thing happened again during the summer of 2020.

Together with LA2, on August 28, 2022, the network underwent a graphical overhaul of its bumper ads starting at 9:30 PM during the program "Che c'è in tivù?" (What's on TV?), which, for the second consecutive year, presents the RSI network schedule for fall 2022.

== Logos and identities ==
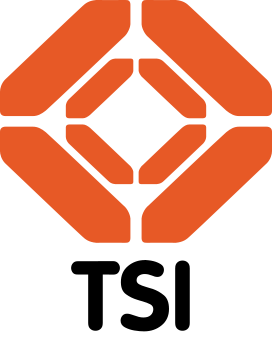
TSI's second logo used from 1993 to 1999.

TSI 1's second logo used from 1999 to 28 February 2009.

RSI La 1's first and previous logo used until 29 February 2012.

RSI La 1's second and current logo since 1 March 2012.

HD logo since 1 March 2012.

== Programmes ==
=== News and information ===
- Telegiornale nazionale: main bulletins at 12.30, 20.00 and 23.00, news summaries at 16.00 and 18.00.
- Il Regionale: regional news programme.
- La Meteo: weather report
- Falò
- Il Quotidiano
- L'Agenda

=== Magazines ===
- Interbang!?
- Mi ritorna in mente
- Origami
- Scacciapensieri
- Storie
- EtaBeta
- TV Spot
- Un'ora per voi

=== Game shows ===
- Attenti a quei due...
- Cash
- Celomanca
- Pausa Pranzo
- Spaccatredici
- UnoNessunoCentomila
- Zerovero

=== Entertainment ===
- Eurovision Choir
- Eurovision Song Contest
- Eurovision Young Musicians
- Junior Eurovision Song Contest

== See also ==
- Televisione svizzera di lingua italiana
- List of Italian-language television channels
