= Superunion =

Brand and design consultancy

Superunion Worldwide Limited
- Trade name: Superunion
- Type: Subsidiary
- Industry: Communications
- Predecessors: Brand Union, The Partners, Lambie-Nairn, Addison and VBAT
- Defunct: April 2023
- Fate: Merged with Design Bridge
- Successor: Design Bridge and Partners
- Headquarters: London, England
- Products: Consultancy
- Number of employees: 500
- Parent: WPP
- Website: www.superunion.com

Superunion, known as Superunion Worldwide Limited legally, was a global brand and design consultancy, headquartered in London. It is a wholly owned subsidiary of WPP. Superunion was formed after five agencies merged in January 2018, and employs 500 people across 16 offices.

In 2023, Superunion merged with Design Bridge to create Design Bridge and Partners.

== History ==
In May 1976, graphic designers Terry Tyrrell and Sam Sampson formed Sampson Tyrrell. The catalyst for this was an opportunity given to them by an advertising agency to help with the corporate identity of British Gas. They worked for clients including Kodak, Lowrey, London Docklands Development Corporation and Legal & General. The business grew slowly and by 1984 had grown to 10 employees working across a broad range of assignments, focusing mainly on graphic design projects. In 1984, Dave Allen joined and helped accelerate growth with assignments from Citizen, Mazda and Castrol. In 1986, Sampson Tyrrell was acquired by the WPP. This resulted in a period of rapid growth and by 1991 the company employed over 100 people in London.

In 1992, Brand Union and Robinson Lambie-Nairn partnered as a cross-platform entity that could allow areas of design beyond their branding and broadcast heritage to work together. Robinson Lambie-Nairn was first formed in 1976 by Colin Robinson and Martin Lambie-Nairn. During the same year, Sampson and Allen led the formation of Enterprise identity Group with Jim Johnson of Anspach Grossman Portugal, Flavio Gomez of Sidjakov Berman Gomez, and Miles Young of Ogilvy & Mather in Asia who owned a design network based in Hong Kong and Taiwan called Artistree. This was in response to the globalisation of international brands, particularly in Asia. The founding businesses were transitioned into a new brand, Enterprise IG, which was launched in 1996. Allen and Johnson became Joint CEOs of the newly formed business.

The business grew organically and by acquisition. This began in 1999 when it became the holding company for Lambie-Nairn & Company. It acquired Horniak and Canny in Australia, Springham Anderson in Singapore, Brindfors Design in Stockholm, Winderlich design in Hamburg and in 2001 Brown KSDP (part of the Tempus acquisition made by WPP) decided to join Enterprise IG - adding offices in Johannesburg, Cape Town, Amsterdam and Paris. This took Enterprise IG to over $100m revenue, 19 offices, and over 700 employees. That year Enterprise IG topped the Design Week 100 league table. In July 2001, Enterprise IG acquired The Identity Business, Ireland's leading brand and identity consultancy. The Enterprise IG global network expanded with 21 regional offices in 18 markets and formally became known as Brand Union in October 2007. In 2008, co-founder Martin Lambie-Nairn left Lambie-Nairn & Company.

In 2018, Brand Union, The Partners, Lambie-Nairn, Addison, and VBAT merged to create the agency, Superunion. In 2022, WPP announced to merge Superunion with Design Bridge to create Design Bridge and Partners. It officially merged in April 2023.

== Offices ==
Superunion has 16 offices around the world:

- Amsterdam
- Bangkok
- Beijing
- Berlin
- Hong Kong
- Jakarta
- Johannesburg
- London
- Los Angeles
- Madrid
- Munich
- New York
- São Paulo
- Shanghai
- Shenzhen
- Singapore
