= Picture Page =

British television programme

- Country of origin: United Kingdom
- Original language: English

Production
- Running time: 60 minutes
- Production company: British Broadcasting Corporation (BBC)

Original release
- Network: BBC Television Service

Picture Page is a British non-fiction television programme, broadcast by the BBC Television Service from their studios at Alexandra Palace from November 2, 1936 to 1939, and again after the service's hiatus during the Second World War from 1946 until 1952. It was the first British television series to become a long-term and regular popular success. The series proved to be very popular with viewers. A BBC survey in 1939 showed the series to be second in popularity behind plays. The series was created and initially edited by Cecil Madden, and among the producers was George More O'Ferrall.

== Format ==
The programme had a magazine format with two hour-long editions broadcast each week including a range of interviews with well-known personalities, features about a range of topics and coverage of public events. The main presenter during the pre-war era was Canadian actress Joan Miller who played the role of a "switchboard operator" similar to that of a telephone exchange, "connecting" the viewers to the particular guests and items being featured that week. Miller was nicknamed "The Switchboard Girl" in the popular press and became one of the first television celebrities. She would be assisted by Leslie Mitchell and Jasmine Bligh, two of the BBC's three continuity announcers (the third being Elizabeth Cowell).

Picture Page celebrated its 200th edition on 15 December 1938 with a "huge birthday cake". At that time the show had welcomed "1,450 items in which have taken part over 1,500 men, 660 women, the ghost of Alexandra Palace and a large number of animals of all kinds, including goats, snakes, lions and mice."

After the reinstatement of the programme during 1946, Joan Gilbert assumed presenting duties until 1952. Mary Malcolm presented some shows in 1949 and 1950.

== Preservation ==
Picture Page was produced live by the BBC from their Alexandra Palace television studio for the entirety of its run. The first episode was actually broadcast on 8 October 1936, some three and a half weeks before the official opening of the service on 2 November, as part of the ongoing test transmissions during the prelude to the initiation date. Until 1949 the series was not recorded and thus none of the pre-1949 programmes exist anymore. Four shows from 1951 have survived in the form of telerecordings.

== Theme tune ==
The theme tune Shopping Centre was composed by Philip Green.
