= Joan Gilbert =

English broadcaster (1906–1991)

- Sunday Mirror, 1944
- Born: 11 August 1906; Cambridge, Cambridgeshire, England
- Died: 29 January 1991 (aged 84)
- Occupation: Broadcaster
- Years active: 1933–1958

Joan Gilbert (11 August 1906 – 29 January 1991) was an English television broadcaster for the BBC. She began working at the BBC as a shorthand typist in 1933 and became secretary of the radio programme In Town Tonight four months later. In 1938, Gilbert moved into television as a scout and assistant editor to producer Cecil Madden on the weekly programme Picture Page. She was at the BBC's Overseas Unit Light Entertainment presenting radio broadcasts for British troops stationed overseas during the Second World War. Upon the resumption of television broadcasting in the United Kingdom in 1946, Gilbert became editor-in-chief and presenter of the afternoon and evening editions of Picture Page and various programmes aimed at women.

== Biography ==
Gilbert was born in Cambridge on 11 August 1906 and was of Irish descent. She had most of her childhood spent at a French convent school in Sussex and did not see much of her father, who was on service in India. When she was young, Gilbert thought about becoming an interior designer or a dress designer. In 1933, she joined the staff at the BBC as a shorthand typist in the sound radio variety department as a consequence of a golf match between her father and a BBC official. Four months later, she became the secretary of W. H. Hanson, the producer of the radio programme In Town Tonight. Gilbert conducted interviews with many people alongside Brian Michie over a period of five years. She left the programme after Hanson died in 1937. The following year, Gilbert moved into television, something she was fascinated by. She worked as a scout and assistant editor to Cecil Madden, the producer of the weekly programme Picture Page. She also wrote the programme's scripts and located people to interview, conducting the interviews herself.

When the BBC suspended its television service upon the outbreak of the Second World War, Gilbert held jobs in wartime radio broadcasting. She was seconded to the Ministry of Information for a short period of time. In June 1940, Gilbert was recalled by the BBC to work at its Overseas Unit Light Entertainment headquartered at the Criterion Theatre, London as a presenter of radio broadcasts for British troops stationed overseas. She was the presenter of the half-hour Monday evening programme Hello Gibraltar! in which she broadcast to troops stationed in Gibraltar and their families. At the suggestion of Gibraltar's governor-general Noel Mason-MacFarlane, Gilbert travelled to Gibraltar in 1943 to meet troops who listened to the programme. She was the compere of the first Radio Girl Friend programmes for the Gibraltar Garrison, and was the organiser of the American Eagle in Britain that broadcast to the United States from American Red Cross clubs in Belfast, Edinburgh and London until it closed in 1945.

Upon the resumption of television broadcasting in the United Kingdom in 1946, Gilbert became editor-in-chief and presenter of the afternoon and evening editions of the programme Picture Page. There was no intention of putting her on-screen but she did so after a suitable presenter was not found. Gilbert shared interviewing duties of notable individuals to ordinary citizens with Leslie Mitchell and reported on the Wedding of Princess Elizabeth and Philip Mountbatten at Westminster Abbey in 1947. Following a bout of illness in 1950, she stopped editing Picture Page and focused on interviewing and presenting for the programme; Gilbert was replaced by Mary Malcolm when she was unwell. She was made Television Personality of the year in 1951. Gilbert presented the fortnightly programme Weekend Magazine in mid-1952, a re-branding of Picture Page.

Gilbert made her last television appearance as a BBC staff member on 30 June 1953 and became a freelance broadcaster and writer, having left the corporation on amicable terms. She was the presenter of various programmes aimed at women. Gilbert hosted the afternoon magazine programme for housewives About the Home from 1951 to 1958, the TWW general interest series Women's View in late 1958, and the fortnightly magazine programme Joan Gilbert's Diary from September 1953 in which she interviewed notable individuals. Gilbert wrote a regular weekly column about the people she met and what she watched on television in the television magazine TV Mirror from December 1953 to August 1955. She joined the News of the World newspaper in February 1955 as a contributor of a weekly feature. Gilbert's final years saw her work in charity, particularly with Christian Aid, and she was the London co-ordinator of Mother Teresa's appeal.

== Personal life ==
She did not marry. Gilbert died on 29 January 1991.
