= BBC One "Lens" idents =

Package of television identifiers created by MansvsMachine and BBC Creative

The Hall – Showtime ident

The BBC One "Lens" idents are the current set of on-screen channel identities used on BBC One; soft launched with the channel's Christmas presentation in December 2021, and officially launched on 1 April 2022, replacing the 'Oneness' idents. The identity was developed by BBC Creative and branding agency ManvsMachine.

== Components of look ==
ManvsMachine said the idents are designed to capture "British life through multiple lenses". Each ident features a large community space, being utilised for a variety of different purposes. The idents present these spaces by slowly rotating around the image, with a circular, lens effect showing parts of the space being used for different events, during different times of day, and in different configurations. Each location has a set of three idents each; corresponding scenes from the other two idents are shown within the lens. Like the "Circle" idents, the lens device pays homage to BBC One's historic use of a rotating globe as part of its identity. The music of the idents were produced by Resonate, a sound design agency in London.

The idents were originally intended to launch in October 2021 alongside the introduction of the new BBC logo, but the launch was delayed to April 2022; a repackaged version of the existing "Oneness" idents were used in the meantime, while the remainder of the presentation package associated with the idents launched as scheduled.

== Idents ==
=== Regular idents ===
Title		Air dates	Description
Warehouse	Skateboarding	1 April 2022 – present	A group of people skateboard in an empty warehouse (Village Underground, Shoreditch, London). The lens rotates to reveal a figure drawing class and a rave. This was the first ident of the new look to be used at 7pm on 1 April 2022.
Warehouse	Rave	1 April 2022 – present	A group of people rave in the same empty warehouse. The lens rotates to reveal the figure-drawing class and the group of skateboarders. Normally used to introduce entertainment and music programming.
Warehouse	Drawing	2 April 2022 – present	A person lies on a bench in a figure-drawing class, with people painting the person. The lens rotates to reveal the group of skateboarders and the group of ravers.
Hall	Trampoline	1 April 2022 – present	A group of people bounce on trampolines in a hall (Yeomanry House, Bloomsbury, London). The lens rotates to reveal a prenatal class and a group of people preparing for an event.
Hall	Showtime	1 April 2022 – present	A group of people prepare for an event, lifting a disco ball towards the ceiling, and testing lights. The lens rotates to reveal the prenatal class and the group of people bouncing on a trampoline. Normally used to introduce entertainment and music programming.
Hall	NCT	2 April 2022 – present	A prenatal class. The lens rotates to reveal the group of people bouncing on a trampoline and the group of people preparing for an event.
Farmland	Festival	1 April 2022 – present	A campsite at a festival (South Farm, Kent). The lens rotates to reveal ramblers in stormy weather and sheep running across a field. Normally used to introduce entertainment and music programming.
Farmland	Livestock	1 April 2022 – present	Sheep run across a field. The lens rotates to reveal the ramblers in stormy weather and the campsite at the festival.
Farmland	Ramblers	3 April 2022 – present	Ramblers in stormy weather. The lens rotates to reveal the campsite at the festival and sheep running across a field.
Market	Calm	2 April 2022 – present	A bridge underpass (Scoresby Street, Southwark, London). The lens rotates to reveal a market taking place at the underpass and the aftermath of the market.
Market	Hustle	1 April 2022 – present	The same market by a bridge underpass. The lens rotates to reveal the aftermath of the market and the same empty location.
Market	Aftermath	2 April 2022 – present	The aftermath of the earlier market, with people cleaning up the street. The lens rotates to reveal the earlier market taking place at the underpass and the same empty location.
Bench	Empty	1 April 2022 – present	An empty bench at night (Windmill Hill, Hitchin, Hertfordshire). The lens rotates to reveal a family sitting at the bench and a group of teenagers congregating. Normally used to introduce the news, along with overnight simulcasts of the BBC News Channel.
Bench	Teens	1 April 2022 – present	A group of teenagers congregate at the bench on their way home from school. The lens rotates to reveal the family sitting at the bench, and the bench at night. First aired on the same night the new Lens idents launched on 1 April 2022.
Bench	Family	2 April 2022 – present	A family sitting at the same bench. The lens rotates to reveal the group of teenagers congregating, and the bench at night.
Sky	Daytime	3 April 2022 – present	A shot of the daytime sky (Windmill Hill, Hitchin, Hertfordshire, the same location as the Bench idents). The lens rotates to reveal the sky in the evening and at night. Normally used to introduce the news.
Sky	Evening	2 April 2022 – present	A shot of the evening sky. The lens rotates to reveal the sky in the daytime and at night. Normally used to introduce the news. A still version of this ident was used once on 12 December 2022.
Sky	Night	1 April 2022 – present	A shot of the night sky. The lens rotates to reveal the sky in the daytime and in the evening. Normally used to introduce the news, along with overnight simulcasts of the BBC News Channel.
Outdoor Pool	Swim Squad	20 April 2022 – present	A group of people swimming outdoors (Park Road Lido, Crouch End, London). The lens rotates to reveal a man diving into a pool where two women are sitting and a group of people partying in the pool.
Outdoor Pool	Clowning Around	21 April 2022 – present	A man dives into the pool where two women are sitting. The lens rotates to reveal the group of people swimming outdoors and the group of people partying in the pool.
Outdoor Pool	Party	24 April 2022 – present	A group of people party in the pool. The lens rotates to reveal the group of people swimming outdoors and the man diving into the pool where two women are sitting.
Café	First Date	9 May 2022 – present	A couple having their first date in the café. The lens rotates to reveal a group of people celebrating about winning a cup in the café and a group of builders having a food break in the café.
Café	Builders	10 May 2022 – present	A group of builders having a food break in the café. The lens rotates to reveal the group of people celebrating about winning a cup in the café and the couple having their first date in the café.
Café	The Cup Winners	10 May 2022 – present	A group of people celebrating about winning a cup in the café. The lens rotates to reveal the group of builders having a food break in the café and the couple having their first date in the café. Normally used to introduce sports programmes, and in particular football.

=== Special idents ===
Title	Air dates	Description
The Capture	27 – 29 August 2022	A modified version of the Market "Aftermath" ident with a CCTV-style graphics to promote series 2 of The Capture. It was preceded by a special trailer of the series featuring the hijacking versions of Strictly Come Dancing, Frozen Planet II and MasterChef trailers respectively, as well as a mysterious deep voice interrupting the continuity announcer (Duncan Newmarch) during Antiques Roadshow, at 8:00pm on 28 August 2022.
HM Queen Elizabeth II	10 – 19 September 2022	Same as the "Family" ident from 2021, but with the coat of arms of Queen Elizabeth II and coloured purple. The text reads "HM Queen Elizabeth II - Remembered", in all caps. This ident was used to introduce special programmes following her death and leading up to her state funeral.
100 Years of Our BBC	18 October – 2 December 2022	These idents were used to introduce special programming across BBC One, BBC Two, BBC Four and BBC Scotland, following BBC's centennial celebrations. "Quiet Joy 2" was the final BBC 100 centenary ident used on BBC One, at 8:00pm on 2 December 2022.
Doctor Who	2024: 6 May 2024; 2025: 2 – 13 April 2025	Used to promote the fourteenth series of Doctor Who in 2024. Same as the Market "Calm" ident, but the Fifteenth Doctor (played by Ncuti Gatwa) provides the voiceover for introducing EastEnders; however, he accidentally punches up the 1953 "Bat's Wings" and 1966 "Watch Strap" idents by the TARDIS. In 2025, the Doctor and the TARDIS appear inside the lens (via a glow effect) to promote the programme's fifteenth series.
BBC1 COW	8 January – 13 February 2025	This Northern Ireland-exclusive ident used to promote Video Nasty. Same as the Bench "Teens" ident, but when the lens partially rotates to reveal the COW, the ident then glitches into the 1985 ident. It was also used to promote EastEnders's 40th anniversary, at 7:30pm on 13 February 2025.

=== Christmas idents ===
Title	Air dates	Description
Shaun the Sheep: The Flight Before Christmas	4 – 31 December 2021	A set of idents themed around the Aardman Animations franchise Shaun the Sheep, promoting its new special premiering as part of BBC One's Christmas programming. It consisted of three scenes panning around a Christmas tree being assembled by the sheep; the daytime version showing the tree being pulled up, but falling on one sheep's head due to the appearance of the farmer. Another is set during the evening, with the tree being dressed and pumped by Timmy on a bicycle. The last version is set at night, with the lights being turned on and the sheep bleating "Jingle Bells". Each ident also features a variation without the characters used to introduce news and other serious programmes. The idents contain elements of the then-upcoming "Lens" idents, such as a rotating scene and multiple variations in the same location at different times of the day (although they do not use the lens device itself). The idents were used from the evening of 4 December 2021, through BBC One's New Year's Eve special on 31 December 2021, after which the repackaged Oneness idents were reinstated.
The Boy, the Mole, the Fox and the Horse	2 – 31 December 2022	A set of idents featuring characters from the Charlie Mackesy storybook, promoting its animated adaptation premiering as part of BBC One's Christmas programming. The daytime version showed the boy and the mole eating a Christmas pudding. Another is set at night, with the boy and the mole sitting on the tree while the fox and the horse come to them. The last version is set during the evening, with the titular characters walking on the river. There's also an alternative version of the river ident without the characters used to introduce the news, but was withdrawn on 11 December 2022.
Julia Donaldson and Axel Scheffler characters	2 – 31 December 2023	A set of idents by Magic Light Pictures featuring various characters from Julia Donaldson and Axel Scheffler children's books, including Tabby McTat and family snoozing under a Christmas tree (promoting the Tabby McTat animated adaptation premiering as part of BBC One's Christmas programming), Stick Man and his family receiving Christmas presents from Santa outside during the evening, and The Gruffalo and his child playing around in the snow during the daytime. These three idents were also accompanied by reprisals of the Christmas idents from 2020, including the Gruffalo's Child, Zog, and Christmas tree idents (the last of which used to introduce news and other serious programmes).
Wallace & Gromit: Vengeance Most Fowl	30 November — 31 December 2024	A set of idents that feature characters from the Aardman Animations franchise Wallace & Gromit, promoting the 25 December premiere of Wallace & Gromit: Vengeance Most Fowl on BBC One. The first features Wallace, Gromit and Norbot sitting down on the sofa wearing Christmas jumpers to watch TV, the second has Wallace unveiling a mechanical spinning Christmas tree outside at night with Norbot on top as the angel, and the third involves the trio sculpting ice figures outside during the day with Norbot sculpting a figure of Feathers McGraw. A fourth ident featuring an empty living room with a decorated Christmas tree and a portrait of Wallace & Gromit hung up on the wall was used to introduce the news. There's also a special version of the news-safe ident featuring Feathers to promote series 3 of The Traitors.
The Gruffalo and Friends	30 November – 31 December 2025	A set of idents by Magic Light Pictures featuring various characters from Julia Donaldson and Axel Scheffler children's books, including one featuring Harry O’Hay and Betty O’Barley from The Scarecrows' Wedding being visited by Santa, along with a cameo from Tabby McTat (promoting the premiere of its animated adaptation as part of BBC One's Christmas programming), one featuring The Gruffalo, his child, and Stick Man, and another featuring Zog, Pearl, Gadabout, as well as the Witch from Room on the Broom. The Christmas tree idents, previously used in both 2020 and 2023, were again reprised to introduce the news and other programmes that were deemed too serious to be introduced by the main idents.

== See also ==
- History of BBC television idents

Preceded by Oneness	BBC television idents 1 April 2022 – present	Succeeded by Present
