= BBC One "Oneness" idents =

Package of television identifiers created by Martin Parr

The Exercise Class ident

The BBC One "Oneness" idents were a set of on-screen channel identities used on BBC One from December 2016 until April 2022; soft launched with the channel's Christmas presentation, and officially launched on 1 January 2017, the idents largely featured scenes of people performing everyday activities across various locations in the United Kingdom. The idents were developed by BBC Creative in collaboration with photographer Martin Parr.

The ident package was initially retained following the corporate rebrand of the BBC on 20 October 2021, using the company's Chameleon branding design, with the 2021 BBC logo being placed at the top of the screen, while "ONE" remained at the bottom, with the font being changed to BBC Reith Sans. The idents remained in this state for nearly 6 months, before being retired from use at 6pm on 1 April 2022, when the 'Lens' idents debuted.

== Launch ==
Street photographer Martin Parr was commissioned by BBC One to create the idents. The "Oneness" theme had first been exhibited the previous Christmas for the channel's identity, hence giving the impression that those idents ultimately served as a preview to the new look that made its full launch on New Year's Day 2017. Around 24 idents were filmed, and were introduced throughout the year. More idents were introduced throughout 2018.

This is the first set of idents that have been produced with the input of BBC Creative, a new in house creative agency responsible for BBC presentation.

== Components of look ==
Each ident began with a tagline showing who the people are and what they are doing, and the location of where the ident is filmed. At the bottom of the screen, the word "Oneness" was drawn up before fading into the BBC One logo. Programme trailers retained the same look and design of the previous 'Circle' era, except the endboards now consist of a plain red background as opposed to a one with a circular design as before. Some of the idents also seemed to have been inspired/echo the themes of the past 'Rhythm & Movement' ones from before the "Circle" Era. End credits promotional material is changed. The idents were also played without voiceovers, the BBC One logo and the activity and location during regional news-opts on BBC One HD, as regional news programmes are not available on BBC One HD for financial and technical reasons.

Following the replacement of the normal idents during the COVID-19 pandemic from May 2020 to July 2021, most of the Oneness idents were retired (except Bog Snorkellers, Llanwrtyd Wells, Llama Trekkers, Armagh and Mountain Rescue Volunteers, and Brecon Beacons, which were removed following the corporate rebrand of BBC in October 2021). The ones that remained were then modified to suit the new transition devices which were concurrently introduced, with the "Oneness" logo being retired, and the new BBC One logo being split between the top- and bottom-centre of the screen. The English region name below the "ONE" logo was removed, although the nations (Wales, Scotland, and Northern Ireland) continued having the nation name in every ident before every programme.

=== Original set (2017–2020; 2021–2022) ===
Title	Air dates	Description
Exercise Class, Avonmouth (2 versions)	1 January – 25 April 2017	A group of people are performing a dance workout routine. This was the first ident of the new look to be used at 01:00 on 1 January 2017. Removed after a few months due to initial poor reception.
Sea Swimmers, Clevedon (2 versions)	1 January – 2 July 2017	A group of people are walking in and back out of the sea. Initially used for the BBC News before the introduction of more suitable idents. Removed after a few months due to initial poor reception - however, version 2 of the ident appeared before Sunday Politics on 2 July 2017.
Mountain Rescue Volunteers, Brecon Beacons (2 versions)	9 January 2017 – 18 October 2021	A mountain rescue team and their dog are walking down from a 4x4 emergency vehicle in a wintry forest. Commonly used to introduce serious programming, along with the BBC News and overnight simulcasts of BBC News Channel. Both idents were withdrawn from the line-up in 2021, when the BBC corporate logo was revamped.
Wheelchair Rugby Team, Llantrisant (3 versions)	11 January 2017 – 1 May 2020	A team of wheelchair rugby players. Usually used to introduce sporting programmes. Also used in entertainment and comedy programmes, but nowadays used for serious programming and the BBC News. This ident was withdrawn from the line-up in 2020, when the BBC temporally replaced the normal idents with the lockdown ones.
Forest	15 January 2017 – 1 May 2020	A still forest with no people in sight. Thought to be filmed in the Brecon Beacons, the same location as the Mountain Rescue idents. Used for BBC News and sombre/emergency situations. This ident lacks the "oneness" animation. During the COVID-19 pandemic, this ident was used to introduce information and safety adverts from the government in between programmes. This ident was withdrawn from the line-up in 2020, when the BBC temporally replaced the normal idents with the lockdown ones.
Skaters, Southwark	11 March 2017 – 27 April 2020	A group of skaters skate around a dance hall. Often used to introduce daytime programmes, entertainment programmes and comedy programmes. This ident was withdrawn from the line-up in 2020, when the BBC temporally replaced the normal idents with the lockdown ones.
Birdwatchers, Rainham Marshes (2 versions)	11 March 2017 – 1 April 2022	A group of birdwatchers stand in a field, looking at offscreen birds with their binoculars and commenting on them. Primarily used for serious programming and the BBC News - both their main bulletins and overnight simulcasts. Version 1 of the ident was withdrawn from the line-up in 2021, when the BBC corporate logo was revamped.
Cavers, Wemyss	1 April 2017 – 26 April 2020	A group of modern cavers with headlamps are going underground inside the cave. Often used to introduce the menagerie of drama based programmes, BBC Three programmes and serious shows. This ident was withdrawn from the line-up in 2020, when the BBC temporally replaced the normal idents with the lockdown ones.
Bhangra Dancers, Edinburgh New Town	3 April 2017 – 28 April 2020	A group of bhangra dancers dance to Indian music. Primarily used for comedy programming, films and entertainment shows. This ident was withdrawn from the line-up in 2020, when the BBC temporally replaced the normal idents with the lockdown ones.
Tandem Cyclists, Belfast	10 May 2017 – 1 April 2022	A group of tandem cyclists look at the camera and then cycle off. Occasionally used to introduce a wide variety of programmes including the BBC News - both their main bulletins and overnight simulcasts.
Night Kayakers, Killyleagh	10 May 2017 – 31 March 2022	A group of kayakers paddle in the water during the nighttime. Often used for serious programming, programmes from BBC Three, drama shows and the BBC News - both their main bulletins and overnight simulcasts. A version was aired before the Doctor Who tenth series finale, The Doctor Falls, with a Cyberman interrupting the continuity announcer (Duncan Newmarch), "upgrading" him and taking over to read the announcement. This also happened on BBC One Northern Ireland where BBC Northern Ireland announcer Paul Buckle is upgraded by a Cyberman.
Allotment Holders, Smethwick	7 June 2017 – 1 April 2022	A group of allotment holders tend to the ground and then pose to the camera. Used for a wide variety of programmes, along with overnight simulcasts of the BBC News Channel.
Bog Snorkellers, Llanwrtyd Wells (2 versions)	7 June 2017 – 28 August 2021	Five Bog Snorkellers in various costumes. In one ident there are preparing to enter the bog, while in the other they emerge. Used for the likes of entertainment, comedy and live shows. This ident was withdrawn from the line-up in 2021, when the BBC corporate logo was revamped.
Boxers, Digbeth	7 June 2017 – 30 April 2020	A group of boxers pose for the camera and then start an exercise session. Occasionally used for a range of programmes, as well as sport programming. This ident was withdrawn from the line-up in 2020, when the BBC temporally replaced the normal idents with the lockdown ones.
Banger Racers, St Brides	7 June 2017 – 1 April 2022	A group of racers pose through the open windows of their cars, while a race takes place in the background. Often used to introduce drama shows, sport programmes and primetime shows.
Ten Pin Bowlers, Hockley	22 July 2017 – 29 April 2020	A group of ten pin bowlers are ready and waiting to knock down some skittles by using a ten pin bowl. Frequently used for entertainment, comedy shows and live shows. This ident was withdrawn from the line-up in 2020, when the BBC temporally replaced the normal idents with the lockdown ones.
Fell Runners, Mourne Mountains	4 August 2017 – 31 March 2022	A group of runners come to a stop at a group of rocks, and decide where to go next. Used for the likes of daytime, primetime programmes, drama shows and fairly serious programmes.
Llama Trekkers, Armagh	4 August 2017 – 21 July 2021	A group of young people walk through a gate with three llamas. Often used to introduce a wide array of daily based programmes, along with overnight simulcasts of the BBC News Channel. This ident was withdrawn from the line-up in 2021, when the BBC corporate logo was revamped.
Drone Racers, Nottingham	1 January 2018 – 30 April 2020	A group of young people play around with their drones. Frequently used to introduce entertainment, reality and comedy programmes. Originally filmed in August 2017, but was held back from being shown until the New Year. This ident was withdrawn from the line-up in 2020, when the BBC temporally replaced the normal idents with the lockdown ones.
Wild Campers, Glencoe	1 January 2018 – 1 April 2022	A group of young people come out of their tents. Used for the likes of drama, serious programmes and everyday programmes. Originally filmed in August 2017, but was held back from being shown until the New Year.
Under 7 Footballers, Barnet (2 versions)	15 June 2018 – 1 April 2022	A team of under 7 footballers participate in a training session. First shown to tie in with the start of BBC's coverage of the 2018 FIFA World Cup, but usually used for sporting programmes.
Sausage Dog Walkers, Newcastle upon Tyne	14 July 2018 – 1 April 2022	A group of people with sausage dogs are walking in the seaside park outside the Tyne Bridge in the background, whilst sausage dogs are barking and yapping to help them to fetch some food. Often used to introduce a wide array of programmes, along with BBC News. It was the last Oneness ident to be shown before BBC News at Six. The following junction had the new 'Lens' idents.
Cheerleaders, Manchester	14 July 2018 – 30 April 2020	A group of cheerleaders (9 women and 1 man) dance to hip hop/electropop music. Used for a menagerie of programmes, including entertainment programming. This ident was withdrawn from the line-up in 2020, when the BBC temporally replaced the normal idents with the lockdown ones.
Taekwondo Club, Trafford	14 July 2018 – 1 May 2020	A group of 9 children performs taekwondo martial arts movements during the training session with 2 supporters (mum and dad) watch and learn. Frequently used for sporting programmes, primetime shows and entertainment programmes, along with BBC News. This ident was withdrawn from the line-up in 2020, when the BBC temporally replaced the normal idents with the lockdown ones.
Swing Dancers, County Durham	14 July 2018 – 30 April 2020	A group of 12 swing dancers dancing in a variety of styles. Primarily used for a wide range of programmes. The music heard is a contemporary arrangement of Tiny Parham's Washboard Wiggles, produced by Mcasso. This ident was withdrawn from the line-up in 2020, when the BBC temporally replaced the normal idents with the lockdown ones.
Volunteer Lifeguards, Exmouth (2 versions)	6 August 2018 – 1 April 2022	Nine lifeguards in different surf rescue coats. In one ident there are using surfboards to go back into the sea for surfing, while in the other carry an inflatable rescue boat for the rescue sea mission. Often used to introduce a whole number of programmes, along with overnight simulcasts of the BBC News Channel (version 1 only).
Steel Pan Band, Plymouth	8 August 2018 – 1 April 2022	A group of 12 people in red T-shirts performing Calypso music with steel pan drums at Tinside Lido. Usually used for a selection of all round programmes.

=== 2020 UK lockdown idents (2020–2021) ===
The Tea Breaks ident in 2020

In recognition of the COVID-19 pandemic, BBC One introduced a new "lockdown"-themed series of Oneness idents on 1 May 2020, temporarily replacing the existing Oneness idents. Unlike other Oneness idents, they are presented as collages of themed scenes filmed in a variety of locations across the UK, rather than as a group of people in a single location. The idents were intended to "reflect what we're all going through".

The idents were discontinued on 19 July 2021 (the date in which England formally lifted most of its COVID-19 restrictions, informally referred to in the press as "Freedom Day"), after which some of the normal Oneness idents were reintroduced.

Title	Air dates	Description
Tea breaks, Across the UK	30 April 2020 – 18 July 2021	Cups of tea are being made at various kitchens. Mainly used to introduce the news and other serious programming. This was the first ident of the 2020 UK lockdown idents to be used earlier before the news at 6pm on 30 April 2020 on BBC One Yorkshire, airing on the network afterwards from 1 May, replaced the original 2017 idents.
Teammates, Training at Home	1 May 2020 – 18 July 2021	People kicking a football to one other across different gardens. Mainly used to introduce the sports programming.
Isolation Disco, Neighbours	1 May 2020 – 19 July 2021	People dancing around to music in their own living rooms. This was used to introduced Eurovision: Come Together and Eurovision: Europe Shine a Light during that year's virus pandemic. Mainly used to introduce entertainment and light programming.
In Bloom, Across the UK	2 May 2020 – 18 July 2021	Flowers blooming all at once. Mainly used to introduce the news and other serious programming.
Capoeira Group Practise, At Home	13 May 2020 – 18 July 2021	Originally Capoeira Group Practice, At Home. People dancing in a Capoeira style, inspired by 2002 Capoeira ident from the 2002 'Rhythm & Movement' set. On the evening of Monday 22 June, the caption was changed to Capoeira Group Practise, At Home. Mainly used to introduce sports, drama and films programming.
Cabaret Cooking, At Home	13 May 2020 – 17 July 2021	People cooking and eating their Cabaret food. Mainly used to introduce comedy and light programming.
Knit Club, At Home	20 May 2020 – 18 July 2021	People are doing knitting in their own dining rooms. Mainly used to introduce daytime and prime-time programming.
Choir Rehearsal, Across the UK	20 May 2020 – 18 July 2021	People singing and choirs in a style of melodies. Mainly used to introduce a variety of programming.
Cat Naps, At Home	24 October 2020 – 19 July 2021	Domestic cats meowing, purring and sleeping in their someone else's rooms. Mainly used to introduce the news and prime-time programming.
Bread Makers, Across the UK	2 November 2020 – 19 July 2021	People making bread by using a dough on board covered with flour in their kitchens. Mainly used to introduce the news, food based and other serious programming.
England Fans, From Across the UK (2 versions) (Euro 2020)	10 – 11 July 2021	Aired before programming leading to the final of Euro 2020 between England and Italy.

=== Special idents ===
Title	Air dates	Description
Let it Shine	7 January – 25 February 2017	Used to promote Let it Shine, the ident features: Graham Norton, Mel Giedroyc, Dannii Minogue, Martin Kemp and Gary Barlow. This logo is placed at the middle of the screen instead of the bottom, like the 2006 idents.
One Love Manchester	4 June 2017	Used to introduce the One Love Manchester benefit concert, the ident features the BBC One logo in the middle of the screen on a splash of black background over the top of the usual red one, with a single bee flying over it. The "O" in the logo is shaped like a heart.
Generic	14 June 2017 – 14 December 2021	Used to introduce the BBC News at Six a day after the Grenfell Tower fire, which happened on the evening of Tuesday 13 June 2017. Similar to the One Love Manchester ident, the BBC One logo silently appears on a dark red background. It was used first in BBC One Northern Ireland on 14 June 2017 and was later used on BBC One to introduce DEC Indonesian Tsunami Appeal on 4 October the next year. On 17 April 2021, a new version of Generic ident was introduced. On 13 and 14 December 2021, shown on BBC One's regional variations in Scotland and Wales before a statement from their First Ministers.
Pitch Battle	16 – 17 June 2017	Used to promote Pitch Battle. The ident featured various choirs from the show singing the theme tunes of The One Show, EastEnders, The Graham Norton Show, Doctor Who and Casualty before they aired over the weekend. An ident featuring all of the choirs was used to introduce Pitch Battle itself.
Strictly Come Dancing	9 September – 25 December 2017	Used to introduce Strictly Come Dancing. This ident features the Strictly pro dancers waltzing around in a circle, nodding to the previous incarnation of BBC One idents from 2006, whilst people are heard humming the first few bars of the Strictly theme tune. Like the Let It Shine variant, the BBC One logo is in middle of the screen instead of the bottom, similar to the 2006 idents.
BBC Threetime (BBC Three on BBC One)	4 March 2019 – 31 January 2022	It marks the airing of the pre–2016 length of BBC News at Ten and at the same time the official return of BBC Three on TV, after it was closed down in 2016. It was used to introduce BBC Three programs on certain weekdays. This ident was last appeared on Monday 31 January 2022 leading up to the return of BBC Three on TV the following Tuesday at 7:00.
Wedding Guests, London (Comic Relief 2019)	7 – 15 March 2019	This ident features the cast of Four Weddings and a Reunion. Used to promote programs leading to the Comic Relief. There were 3 versions of the ident being used.
Donna and the Dynamos, Greece (Comic Relief 2019)	15 March 2019	This ident features the cast of Mamma Mia! Here We Go Yet Again. Used to promote programs leading to the Comic Relief.
Laurence Lyle, A Golf Course (The Open 2019)	16 July 2019	Only used in BBC One Northern Ireland to promote The Open 2019 in Royal Portrush.
Hoopers of Hulme (Children in Need 2019 & 2021)	2019: 13 – 15 November 2019; 2021: 10 – 19 November 2021	Aired before programming related to Children in Need.
Night Kayakers, Trollesund (His Dark Materials)	23 – 24 November 2019	Used to promote His Dark Materials, but it was strangely shown before Michael McIntyre's Big Show. Same as the Night Kayakers, Killyleagh ident, except the Northern Lights and flying ships from the show are shown. Killyleagh is replaced with Trollesund, which is a real-life place in the His Dark Materials universe.
Fundraisers, Across the UK (Children in Need 2020)	1 – 13 November 2020	Aired before programming related to Children in Need.
Small Axe	15 November – 13 December 2020	Aired before programming to coincide the anthology series Small Axe, featuring the flags of Caribbean countries within the Commonwealth in alphabetical order: Antigua and Barbuda, Bahamas, Barbados, Belize, Dominica, Grenada, Guyana, Jamaica, Saint Kitts and Nevis, Saint Lucia, Saint Vincent and the Grenadines and Trinidad and Tobago.
Family	9 – 10 April 2021	A generic BBC ident, featuring a gold coloured BBC logo forming onto a blue background in silence, followed by the continuity announcer saying, "This is the BBC". This ident was first seen to introduce special programming across, BBC One, BBC Two, BBC Scotland, BBC Alba and BBC Parliament following the death of Prince Philip on 9 April 2021. The 2020 UK lockdown idents were restored at 14:00 the following afternoon.
HRH Prince Philip	16 – 17 April 2021	Same as the "Family" ident, but with the coat of arms of Prince Philip. The text reads "HRH Prince Philip - Duke of Edinburgh - Remembered", in all caps. This ident was used to introduce special programmes following the death of Prince Philip.
Fell Runners, Mourne Mountains (BBC Three)	1 February 2022	Used to promote the relaunch of BBC Three and the premiere of RuPaul's Drag Race: UK vs. the World, but it was only shown before The Responder. Same as the Fell Runners, Mourne Mountains ident, but it's interrupted by Janey Jacké, who comes out to the television screen at the living room and tell the viewers to change the channel to BBC Three for showing the premiere of RuPaul's Drag Race: UK vs the World, then the ident plays normally. This also happened on BBC Two and BBC Four.

=== Christmas idents ===
Title	Air dates	Description
BBC Oneness (Christmas)	4 – 31 December 2016	Sunday 4 December saw the official BBC launch of their 2016 festive ident titled Oneness before an episode of Planet Earth II. These idents consist of: a zoom-in clip of several men in a pub, whereby one of them reveals his Christmas jumper with a flashing Rudolph nose on it which becomes the "BBC One" ident, a clip with a grandfather falling asleep in his armchair and his head becoming the BBC One logo, a family seated around a table enjoying the Christmas meal with a person attempting to light a Christmas pudding with the BBC One logo forming in front of it and another with a red bauble being hung on a lit Christmas tree (which doubles up as the variant to introduce the news). The "Winning Weekend" variant - used on the weekend of 17 and 18 December - has a gold bauble being hung on a lit Christmas tree. All of these idents appear with snowflakes flying from them. For Christmas Day, a special set of "Oneness" idents were used to introduce all of the channel's afternoon and evening programmes. Use of the idents ended after BBC One's New Year's Eve special on 31 December, after which the regular Oneness idents officially premiered.
The Supporting Act	2 – 31 December 2017	Originally a stop-motion animated short film used to promote BBC One's Christmas 2017 programming, it was split into three different idents to introduce programmes over this period. In the short film, a young schoolgirl attempts to capture her father's attention by practicing a dance routine for an upcoming school talent show for Christmas. The song "Symphony" by Clean Bandit and Zara Larsson is used within the idents. The idents show the father and daughter in the kitchen doing the washing up, in the living room setting up Christmas lights and running around in a supermarket respectively. Like the previous year, the "BBC One" and "Oneness" logos feature added Christmas decorations and sparkly effects on these idents. Two additional idents shown over this period do not feature the characters, music, or the "Oneness" theme, and are primarily used to introduce the news, one features a view from the kitchen window and the other is a night-time snowy landscape view of the city. BBC One Northern Ireland aired a version of the city ident, but with a few notes from "Symphony". Although regular use of the idents ended after BBC One's New Year's Eve special on 31 December, the presentation was used one last time the next day to introduce a rerun of A Christmas Carol Goes Wrong (as it is featured in mock continuity seen in the special).
Wonderland	1 – 31 December 2018	Used from 1–31 December 2018 and filmed in Cromer, Norfolk including Cromer Pier. A short fantasy, it depicts the distant personal relationship between a busy mother's lifestyle working with IT crossed-over to her son's video-game-driven lifestyle, causing the screens of both to display distorted fragments of each other's content and everyone else's real-time frame to freeze, allowing mother and son to enjoy unique quality time together. The musical theme is Emmy the Great's Lost in You. Two versions were made in this Pier ident, one in day-time and one in night-time. The other two featured the mother and son from the two-minute promotion: one in a scene around a Christmas tree and the other in a bumper car. In both sequences, everyone other than the mother and son are frozen in time. A total of four idents were made, the first three of which have alternate music for use to introduce BBC News bulletins.
#XmasLife	1 – 31 December 2019	Used from 1–31 December 2019; encouraging people to "live their best Xmas life", the short film includes a cuckoo popping out of a clock with a Santa hat, a cat riding a Roomba, people watching TV in their pyjamas, and a mother and daughter re-uniting. There are cameos by Graham Norton and Rochelle Humes, who also appears in one of the short idents. The music is a re-imagining of "Feel Good Inc" by Gorillaz, performed by London choir, Some Voices. The idents were Rochelle Humes sleeping while surrounded by animals, mistletoe on wrapping paper (used for serious programmes like the news, as well as party political broadcasts and results shows for the 2019 United Kingdom general election), snowmen fighting on other wrapping paper (mostly used to introduce the news bulletins), the cuckoo clock and the cat going back and forth on the Roomba, these variants lack the "Oneness" theme.
Zog and the Flying Doctors and The Gruffalo's Child	29 November – 31 December 2020	Used from 29 November–31 December 2020, and produced by Magic Light Pictures, it features characters from Julia Donaldson and Axel Scheffler's children's books. Two idents feature Zog, Princess Pearl and Sir Gadabout the Great from Zog and Zog and the Flying Doctors (promoting the animated adaptation of the latter premiering on BBC One), and another features The Gruffalo and his child from The Gruffalo's Child, as well as a shot of a Christmas tree (with daytime and nighttime variations) to introduce news bulletins and other serious programmes. The Christmas trees were decorated by the characters in the regular idents. In 2023, idents from this run were reprised as part of a second wave of Christmas idents by Magic Light Pictures involving other Donaldson and Scheffler books. The Christmas tree idents were then reprised again in 2025, to introduce the news and other programmes that were deemed too serious to be introduced by the main idents.

== Stings ==
Title	Air dates	Description
Let's Sing and Dance for Comic Relief	4 – 25 March 2017	This special sting is used to promote Let's Sing and Dance for Comic Relief, the promo features: Mel Giedroyc and Sue Perkins wearing Red Noses on their noses. The logo is placed at the middle of the screen instead of the bottom.
All Round to Mrs. Brown's	25 March 2017 – 25 April 2020	Another special sting is used to promote All Round to Mrs. Brown's The promo features Agnes Brown (Brendan O'Carroll) from Mrs. Brown's Boys. The logo is placed at the middle of the screen instead of the bottom.
Eurovision Song Contest 2017	1 – 13 May 2017	This special sting is used to promote the 2017 grand final of Eurovision Song Contest, in a cloudy-starry purple background, a heart symbol zooms in as the text name in the middle of the screen EUROVISion forms in, after the text disappears except for the heart to form the "BBC One" text, then the "BBC One" at the end. Graham Norton announces "We Love Eurovision".
FA Cup Final 2017	26 – 27 May 2017	This special sting is used to promote the BBC's live coverage of the FA Cup final.
Big Day	19 May 2018	This special sting is used to promote BBC One's programmes on 19 May 2018, including the Royal Wedding and the FA Cup Final 2018.
Semi Finals here we come	7 – 10 July 2018	This special sting is used to celebrate England's entry for the World Cup semi finals.

== See also ==
- History of BBC television idents

Preceded by Circle	BBC television idents 4 December 2016 – 1 April 2022	Succeeded by Lens
