= Leslie Mitchell (broadcaster) =

British broadcaster (1905–1985)

Leslie Scott Falconer Mitchell (4 October 1905 – 23 November 1985) was a British actor and broadcaster who was heard on newsreel soundtracks, radio, and television. Raised by his literary uncle William J. Locke and schooled at The King's School, Canterbury, and Chillon College in Switzerland, he began his career as a stage actor in London's West End after a time as a trainee stockbroker. Mitchell was the first voice heard on BBC Television on 2 November 1936, and also gave the inaugural announcement on Associated-Rediffusion, the joint first company to broadcast as part of the ITV network, on 22 September 1955. His voice was perhaps best known from his lengthy relationship with British Movietone News, for which he provided commentary on newsreels throughout the Second World War and into the mid-1970s. Mitchell was appointed a Freeman of the City of London and the Royal Television Society's first honorary member.

== Early life ==
Mitchell was born in Edinburgh, Scotland on 4 October 1905, the only child of the caterer Charles Eric Mitchell and his wife Leslie Florence Whittington (née Lowe), a hostess. Mitchell's parents divorced when he was a child, and his mother emigrated to the United States early in the First World War. He was told his father had died in battle. Mitchell was raised by the novelist and his uncle William J. Locke and his wife; Locke arranged for Mitchell to attend The King's School, Canterbury. His health later prevented him from entering the Royal Navy, and he finished his education at Chillon College on Switzerland's Lake Geneva.

== Career ==
In 1923, he intended to be a novelist, but a stepfather got him a job as a trainee stockbroker in London. This was following the family's financial difficulties, therefore he did not attend university. Mitchell got small roles on the stage. He lacked theatrical training but was able to land roles because of his attractive features and a rich voice. He toured Britain with the Art League for two years beginning in 1923 and afterwards starred in London West End plays. In 1928, he did plays in England and South Africa, toured with Edgar Wallace's Flying Squad and appeared as Captain Stanhope in Journey's End. Mitchell's injuries in a major motorbike accident that saw him pulled by the back wheels of a car for 100 yd (91 m) kept him out of work for more than a year, just as Flying Squad was ready to transfer to the West End. He needed facial surgery, jawline repairs, a damaged eye, and wore a leg brace.

Mitchell worked as an understudy for Leslie Banks in Lady of the Lamp and Nigel Playfair in Journey's End before being sacked; Playfair's stage director Stephen Thomas sacked Mitchell because he was "totally inexperienced." In 1930, he played Andy in Philip Johnson's Long Shadows. Mitchell was also Laurence Olivier and Colin Clive's stand-ins. Mitchell worked as a stage designer, lighter, and interior decorator alongside Playfair's wife. He also sold advertising space for magazines and books.

In 1932, he began working as a dance band commentator on BBC Radio. Mitchell joined the Corporation's staff in 1934 as a general announcer and producer of variety shows. In June 1936, he was one of three announcers selected from 600 applications for the BBC's fledgling Television Service, alongside Jasmine Bligh and Elizabeth Cowell, which was then only available in London. Mitchell did not apply for the job and the BBC had forgotten to notify him that he had been chosen. He, Bligh, and Cowell made their BBC Radio debut as a team on 7 July. Mitchell opened the first high-definition standard test television programme, Here's Looking at You, at the Radiolympia exhibition in London on 26 August.

He was the first British television announcer when the BBC's regular high definition television service was publicly launched from Alexandra Palace on 2 November 1936. Starting from that day, he interviewed well-known and newsworthy guests on the first television magazine programme Picture Page for six years and 264 editions. Mitchell conducted some 20 interviews on the programme each week. Just before the start of the Second World War, he provided commentary for the Movietone News part-time. Mitchell was a panellist on the BBC Regional Programme music show Think of a Number in 1939. He resigned from the BBC in 1939 in order to take up the job. Mitchell enlisted in the British Home Guard during the war, as he could not enroll in the Armed Forces because of his health, and he worked for the BBC Allied Expeditionary Forces Programme on programmes such as March of the Movies. Mitchell appeared as himself in the 1942 comedy film The Black Sheep of Whitehall in which comedian Will Hay drives him to a nervous breakdown. He was the question master of The Brains Trust when war necessitated the suspension of television broadcasting. Mitchell retired from Movietone News on 10 January 1975.

In 1946, suspecting that commercial broadcasting would eventually be allowed in the United Kingdom, he travelled to the United States and gained experience of the methods of publicity used there. In the post-war years he had a stint as filmmaker Alexander Korda's director of publicity, but was mainly a freelance writer, commentator and producer from 1948 onwards. Mitchell was a television commentator on the Wedding of Princess Elizabeth and Philip Mountbatten and the silver wedding of George VI and Queen Elizabeth. From 1950 to 1952, Mitchell featured as an interviewer in several episodes of the Terry-Thomas comedy programme How Do You View? In late 1951, he was the co-presenter and mock counsel on the BBC Light Programme show False Evidence. He interviewed Anthony Eden in the 15-minute single election programme by the Conservative Party in October, and stopped presenting Picture Page at the end of the year when his contract ended. Mitchell was the compère of the first episode of Come Dancing in September 1950. Mitchell played himself in the 1953 British Universal film Genevieve directed by Henry Cornelius. He was the chairman of the panel show One of the Family in 1954, and replaced the unwell Peter Martyn as host of the panel game Find the Link in February 1955.

In June 1955 he joined the ITV commercial franchise Associated-Rediffusion service for weekdays in London, where he became senior announcer, and was also in charge of talks and as chairman of discussion programmes. Mitchell was the first announcer to be heard on the service when it launched on the evening of 22 September 1955. He was the first presenter of the programme This Week, and was the first person to announce on ITV television in the Midlands from the opening ceremony at Birmingham Town Hall in February 1956. Mitchell was moved from the post of the head of talks and discussion features at Associated-Rediffusion to being the service's head of presentation from 14 May 1956 as his former job was divided among other departments.

He became freelance again in 1958; when his contract with Associated-Rediffusion expired at the end of March, he resigned. Though ill health continued to affect him, much of his later work was on programmes concerning the early days of British television, such as a celebration of 25 years of BBC TV which he jointly narrated with Richard Dimbleby in 1961, and a 40th anniversary documentary in 1976. In October 1974 Mitchell appeared on Desert Island Discs and chose his luxury item as a silver box containing a miniature singing bird and a biography of Leonardo da Vinci as his chosen book. He was the author of the book A History of Holland House that was published in 1980.

In 1985, Mitchell made his final television performance in the documentary Around The World In Seven Minutes And Four Times On Saturday.

== Personal life ==
Mitchell was called a "Television Adonis" by the Daily Mail. He was first married to the widow Phyllis Joan Constance on 2 June 1938 until she died at Westminster Hospital in January 1965. Mitchell remarried to Danish-born Inge Vibeke Asboe on 29 October 1966. He had no children in either of his marriages.

His biography Leslie Mitchell Reporting... was published in 1981. Mitchell died of an undisclosed illness in Paddington Community Hospital in London on 23 November 1985 after a final period of ill health. His ashes were scattered in Scotland. A memorial service for him was held at St Paul's, Covent Garden on 5 February 1986.

== Awards ==
Mitchell received the John Logie Baird Award "for outstanding contribution to television" in 1964. He was made the first honorary member of the Royal Television Society in 1983. In January 1984, Mitchell was made a Freeman of the City of London. This was for "his wartime contribution to the morale of Londoners."
