= Elizabeth Cowell =

British broadcaster and television announcer (1912–1998)

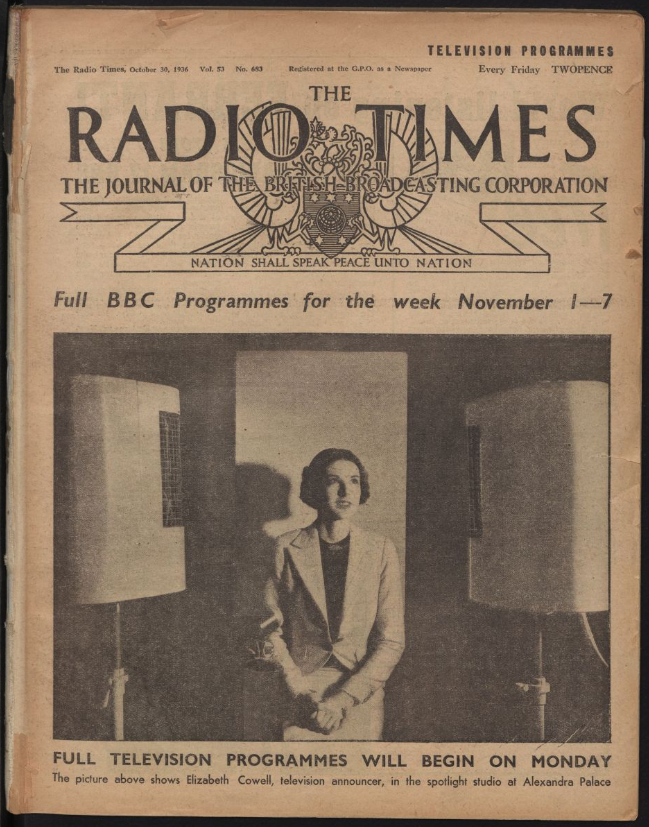
Elizabeth Cowell on the front of the Radio Times - front cover - first TV

Elizabeth Cowell (1912–1998) was a British broadcaster and television announcer.

She was one of the first three BBC Television Service presenters, along with Jasmine Bligh and Leslie Mitchell. She began announcing when the Television Service started in 1936 and made her debut on Monday 31 August that year at Alexandra Palace in London. This was a few months before the official launch of BBC Television on 2 November 1936.

She worked as a driver for the Air Ministry early during World War II before she returned to the BBC.

She returned in 1946 after its nearly seven-year hiatus due to the Second World War. Cowell was the voice of 'the Woman' on the soundtrack of Paul Rotha's documentary Land of Promise (1946).

When BBC television started broadcasting again in 1946 Cowell was married to the laird of a Scottish estate and had left the BBC.
