= Cecil Madden =

British BBC producer (1902–1987)

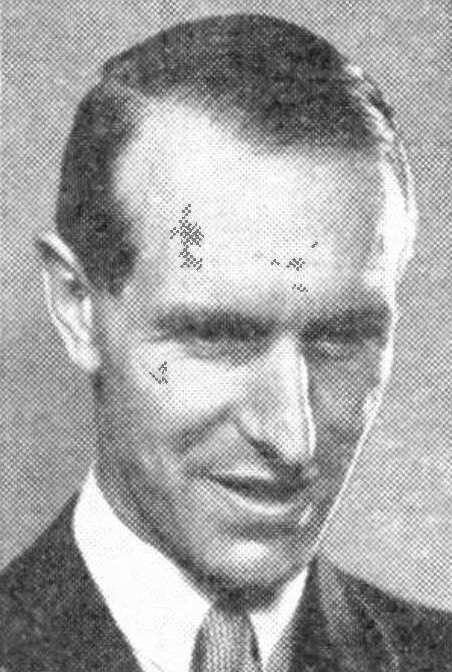
Madden in the 1950s

Cecil Charles Madden, MBE (29 November 1902 – 27 May 1987), was an English pioneer of television production. In 1936, he moved from BBC radio to its experimental television service, and was responsible for many programmes until the service was suspended during the Second World War. After the service resumed in 1946, he resumed his television work, and later became a BBC executive, until his retirement in 1964.

== Life and career ==
Madden was born in Mogador, Morocco, the eldest of three children, all boys, of a British consular official, Archibald Maclean Madden CMG, and his wife, Cecilia Catherine, daughter of Allen Page née Moor. After being educated at French schools in Morocco, schools in Spain, and, in England, at Dover College, he worked for the Rio Tinto Group in Spain. On business trips and during his holidays he attended Broadway productions and worked in theatres in Paris.

In June 1932, Madden married Muriel Emily, née Cochrane. There were a son and a daughter of the marriage. In 1933 he joined the BBC, and was assigned to its talks department, for which he produced a series entitled Anywhere for a News Story. He then produced the outside broadcasting spot on a popular Saturday evening programme, In Town Tonight, before moving to the new Empire Service, the forerunner of the BBC World Service, as a senior producer.

In 1936, the BBC set up a television service, in which Madden joined Gerald Cock, its recently appointed head. After an experimental broadcast in August, the regular service began on 2 November. On that day's schedule, Dallas Bower produced an afternoon variety programme starring Adele Dixon and Buck and Bubbles, and Madden devised and produced the first in a long series titled Picture Page, A Magazine of Topical and General Interest. Radio Times commented the following year, "A characteristic of Cecil Madden's Picture Page that has made it a distinctive part of television programmes has been its unfailing topicality". Madden secured a wide range of guests, ranging from the Sultan of Zanzibar to the conductors Wilhelm Furtwängler and Fritz Reiner, the contract bridge expert Ely Culbertson, the educator Maria Montessori, the theatre director Sir Barry Jackson, politicians, sportsmen and women and others. Until television shut down in September 1939 for the duration of the Second World War, Madden organised and produced live programmes of variety, ballets, and drama. He sometimes appeared in front of the cameras as presenter.

On the outbreak of war, Madden returned to radio. In 1940 he was appointed head of the BBC's overseas entertainment unit, broadcasting to Commonwealth forces serving abroad. He presented the American Eagle in Britain programme from 17 November 1940 to 9 September 1945; The Times commented that it earned Madden the title of the "GI's friend". He also produced the popular Variety Bandbox. Madden's artists included Bing Crosby and Bob Hope, Marlene Dietrich, Gertrude Lawrence, and George Raft; Glenn Miller conducted the band. Among younger artists discovered by Madden were Petula Clark and the Beverley Sisters.

When television reopened on 7 June 1946, Madden returned to his former post. He scheduled new programmes including This Is Your Life and What's My Line. In 1950-51 he was in charge of children's programmes, and is credited by The Times with transforming children's television from "a whimsy affair" into "an intelligent and entertaining show". He then became assistant to the controller of television programmes and worked mostly in management rather than producing, until his retirement from the BBC in 1964.

Madden, a resident of Chelsea, died in Westminster Hospital, London on 27 May 1987.
