= BBC One "Rhythm & Movement" idents =

Set of idents used on BBC One (2002–2006)

Capoeira was regularly used before news broadcasts.

The BBC One "Rhythm & Movement" idents were a set of on-screen channel identities designed by Lambie-Nairn and used on BBC One from 29 March 2002 to 7 October 2006. They replaced the balloon idents, and spelled the end of the much recognised globe identity by the BBC, which had been used in various ways since 1963.

== Components of look ==
The presentational package featured numerous people of various backgrounds dancing in a predominantly red background to a soundtrack based around an upbeat central jingle. The BBC One logo is now located in a red box, similar in style to BBC Two's idents of the time, with the BBC logo stacked on top of an upper case 'ONE'. The music for all idents was written by Peter Lawlor of Water Music Productions in London. The look was also the first one not to feature a station clock. It has been reported that a station clock was designed for the new look, however BBC Marketing decided not to use it. The concerns with this stemmed around a lack of a serious ident to link into the news, and indeed this problem famously occurred one day into the new look upon the death of The Queen Mother.

Promotional style originally consisted of the BBC One box placed in the lower left corner of the screen throughout the promotion and an end board consisting of a translucent white strip along the bottom containing the box logo. This end board style was recreated for the, less frequently seen, static captions. This style was changed on 1 May 2004 to a plain red background that would close shut over the end of a promotion to contain the programme title. The static slide was also updated, with the space for the programme image reduced to the top quarter of the screen.

=== Idents ===
Title	Air dates	Description
Capoeira	29 March 2002 – 7 October 2006	Filmed against the London skyline above the now–demolished tower of International Press Centre on Shoe Lane in Holborn, it shows two performers, Mestre Poncianinho and Contra-Mestre Casquinha, doing Capoeira, a Brazilian martial art. The camera circles around them throughout its duration, and they are also dressed in red and white. An alternative edit, which joins the action a few seconds earlier than the standard version, was used in Wales, Scotland and Northern Ireland. Until 2004, blurred stills of this ident were used for slides, such as breakdown slides and menus, as well as a sombre ident on the day of The Queen Mother's funeral. This ident was commonly seen introducing the lunchtime news on weekdays. This was the first ident in the new set to be shown on television at 9am on 29 March 2002.
Ballet	29 March 2002 – 7 October 2006	Filmed at the open-air Minack Theatre in Cornwall, the ident features 10 ballerinas dressed entirely in red. The camera slowly tracks, showing the Minack stage where the ballerinas perform a graceful dance, with the dramatic Cornish coastline in the background, accompanied by a string quartet playing the jingle with the cello dominant. This sequence was the most sombre of all the idents, and a still of it was used when BBC announced the death of The Queen Mother. For most of its life, this ident was used during times of "reflection" only, namely times of national tragedy and the death of a Royal Family member. It was mainly used to introduce coverage of funerals, such as those of Pope John Paul II and George Best. This ident was also the last out of all the Rhythm and Movement idents to be shown on the channel, played in full as part of the final montage.
Acrobat	29 March 2002 – 7 October 2006	Filmed in the Royal Horticultural Society Halls in Victoria, the ident shows three acrobat performers in white costumes, on red sashes (Aerial Silks) performing acrobatic tricks while suspended from the roof. The accompanying jingle, resembling the track "Clubbed to Death" by Rob Dougan, is mid-tempo and performed by a string section. This ident was also used frequently to introduce the news. It was conceived & choreographed by Roger Robinson of Acrobat Productions and the 3 aerial performers were Jane Osborn (left), Melissa Merran (centre), and Michele Laine (right).
Hip-Hop	29 March 2002 – 7 October 2006	Sometimes known as Basketball, and filmed at Shepperton Studios, this ident shows three basketball players dancing in their wheelchairs to a hip hop theme. The dancers are all dressed in red, with matching accents on their wheelchairs. The lead dancer is Ade Adepitan, a British paralympic basketball player, and presenter of the CBBC programme Xchange. The dance is made up of different wheelchair-basketball moves used in the game.
Festival	29 March 2002 – 7 October 2006	Sometimes known as Rave, and filmed at RAF Bovingdon, it begins with a close up of two women dancing together with a "techno"-style version of the BBC One jingle playing in the background, before zooming out to reveal a large crowd of people dancing in the same way, somewhat resembling a rave party. Red takes a prominence in the background. This version of the jingle was sampled in a later dance music track, "Forever and a Day" by State One in 2003.
Salsa	29 March 2002 – 7 October 2006	Filmed in Sarratt, Hertfordshire against a decorated red backdrop, the camera first focuses on a couple dancing salsa, and then reveals a large group of dancing couples from a variety of backgrounds doing the same thing.
Haka	29 March 2002 – 12 March 2005	Filmed in a field of Gilfach Goch in Wales, it first shows a closeup of a Māori native, Jo Hutley, and then pulls back to reveal 14 Welsh amateur rugby players performing Haka, a traditional Māori dance that shows art and movement by using hands, feet, legs, body, voice, tongue and eyes. The players are dressed in red-striped polo shirts. The music is slow and played on strings, accompanying the sound of the rugby players' chant. This ident was eventually withdrawn after licensing issues with the music, and did not appear in the final montage. It was also one of the only two idents to be withdrawn during its run (the other being the "reflection" version of Tai-Chi). The ident was usually used to introduce sports programming, and occasionally to introduce the weekend news bulletins.
Tap Dogs	29 March 2002 – 7 October 2006	Filmed inside Littlebrook Power Station in Dartford, Kent, this ident shows six members of the dance troupe Tap Dogs performing a tap dance in red T-shirts. The upbeat jingle incorporates the sound of the troupe's tap shoes.
Music Video	4 October 2002 – 7 October 2006	First broadcast on 4 October 2002, to coincide with the premiere of Fame Academy, the ident was filmed in a studio with a red backdrop. It features one lead dancer and six back-up dancers. This ident resembles a music video, hence its name. It was the first ident that was not part of the original set of eight.
Bollywood	8 November 2002 – 7 October 2006	First broadcast on 8 November 2002, this ident features 9 males and 9 females dancing a traditional Indian dance, much like a Bollywood movie. The females wear red in this ident, while the males wear white.
Tango	2 January 2003 – 7 October 2006	Also known as Salsa 2. Launched on 2 January 2003, the ident was filmed in Leadenhall Market in the City of London and features three couples dancing the tango, supposedly in the rain.
Tai-Chi	16 June 2003 – 7 October 2006	First broadcast on 16 June 2003, the ident features seven people dressed in traditional Chinese clothing performing tai chi on a lochside. This ident had two versions: one with the camera drawing back, revealing all the performers and their mirror image on the loch; the other (withdrawn in 2003) starts with the mirror image and spins round to reveal that the viewer is actually looking at the reflection. The tai chi exponents in the ident were mainly students of Edinburgh-based tai chi instructor Ian Cameron, most of whom are teachers in their own right. The particular tai chi form performed was taken from the traditional Wudang system, adapted to suit the demands of the landscape. It was filmed near Loch Rannoch in Scotland. It was used frequently before the news.
Skateboarders	5 September 2003 – 7 October 2006	Launched on 5 September 2003, the ident features three skateboarders skateboarding through a shipyard. This ident was filmed on location at the Harland and Wolff Shipyard in Belfast, Northern Ireland. The featured skateboarders are, from left to right, British professional skateboarders Olly Todd, Franklin Stephens and Danny Wainwright. Because the accompanying jingle is a mellow interpretation performed on a solo piano, this ident was often used to introduce the news, and when exiting the afternoon CBBC strand. It was also often used in the Midlands and Northern Ireland. On 7 September 2005, BBC Northern Ireland made a slight alteration to the skateboarders ident by turning the "BBC One NI" logo from red to green and introducing a new square in the opposite corner of the screen showing an English flag with the word "Nil" written over it. This was to celebrate Northern Ireland's 1–0 victory over England in a qualifier match for the 2006 FIFA World Cup. The ident was shown again the following Saturday ahead of Football Focus. It was the last ident to be used in Northern Ireland due to the setting of the ident taking place in Belfast.
Maasai	5 January 2004 – 7 October 2006	Launched on 5 January 2004, to coincide with the 2004 series of Big Cat Diary, this ident was filmed in the Maasai Mara in Kenya by the BBC Natural History Unit. It features nine native Maasai tribesmen dancing in the centre. It is the only 'Rhythm & Movement' ident to be filmed outside the UK. The music is a predominantly percussion-based version of the BBC One jingle.
Tumbler	4 January 2005 – 7 October 2006	First broadcast on 4 January 2005, the ident features five people (all with some red on their clothes) breakdancing on a walkway. It had to be relaunched after 24 hours, apparently due to a copyright dispute over the background music. BBC One Scotland continued to use the original version until the rebranding in 2006. The jingle is upbeat and features synthesised brass. It was filmed on location at the Brunswick Centre, London and was the final 'Rhythm & Movement' ident to be added to its regular playlist.

=== Special idents ===
The BBC continued its long tradition of using special idents at Christmas time throughout this branding period. The first ident, Snowflakes featured children dressed as snowflakes falling to earth and running around against a red sky background. This ident was used on 20 December 2002 and, for the first time in its history, was reused again on 19 December 2003. BBC Two also followed suit the same year, although rather than reusing an ident, they were used alongside that year's newer one. This reusing of the previous years ident caused public controversy and, as a result a new ident, entitled Christmas Puddings, was created the following year. The ident featured children dressed in red and bouncing on Space Hoppers that looked like Christmas puddings against a red background, as well as the BBC One logo was glittering around. The ident was designed by a young viewer of the children's programme Blue Peter, as part of a competition. A new ident was commissioned for 2005 entitled Christmas Tree. In this one included children, again dressed in red, walking round a giant Christmas tree, carrying brightly coloured balls. The background this time was green, reusing the glittering logo from the previous ident, and the look and music has often been compared to the 2005 film Charlie and the Chocolate Factory directed by Tim Burton. Each ident also featured a variation used to introduce news and other serious programmes, a practice which was carried through to the Christmas variations of the "Circles", "Oneness" and "Lens" idents.

On BBC One Wales, on 15 May 2002, the day following an international friendly between the Welsh and German national football teams, whose result was 1-0 with a Welsh victory, two special idents were broadcast – one featuring footage of the only goal in the match and the other, the "Festival" ident both of which featuring a visual pun where a white "BBC NIL Germany" logo appeared. Later in November 2003, an ident was shown to celebrate Wales' win in the UEFA Euro 2004 qualifying play-off. Played to the "Festival" music, it featured Wales supporters celebrating in a public house. Between 19 and 21 March 2005, to coincide the 2005 Six Nations Championship, the ONE in the BBC ONE box in the bottom-left corner of the screen was replaced with WON after Wales' victory.

This look was unusual in that no special idents were produced for events or programmes. However, a way used to promote the third series of Little Britain was for the show's announcer, Tom Baker to provide the continuity announcements for the evening over the normal idents.

== Parodies ==
The idents were very quickly parodied by digital channel E4 in 2002 with spoofs of the Capoeira, Ballet and Acrobat idents. The martial artists beat each other up in the Capoeira spoof, a ballerina bounces on the floor in the Ballet spoof, and the artists have trouble in the final execution in the Acrobat spoof.

Comedians French and Saunders also created spoof idents for their 2002 Christmas special in which, dressed as old women, they first copied the Acrobat ident yet came loose from their ribbons and fell to the ground while in a spoof of Hip-Hop, the pair drove around slowly in mobility scooters. The Acrobat parody was also filmed at the Royal Horticultural Society Halls and the Hip-Hop parody was filmed in Sarratt, in which the latter parody had the same setting of the Salsa ident.

Comedian Peter Kay also made spoof editions of the Hip-Hop ident in 2003 in the guise of his Phoenix Nights character Brian Potter. The second version was shown minus the BBC One logo in 2005. This ident was used to introduce the Comic Relief of 2003.

A further spoof featured Jon Culshaw as Tony Blair dancing in a fictional ident outside 10 Downing Street. This was shown on a 14 July 2003 episode of Dead Ringers, broadcast on BBC Two.

Spoofs have also cropped up in BBC Three's animated adult comedy series Monkey Dust from series 2-3, making use of the generic red theme of the normal idents to show short films such as a gangland killing and the resulting aftermath.

== Replacement ==
In August 2005, BBC One controller Peter Fincham had hinted that the dancers may be on their way out. He told the Edinburgh International Television Festival that "It may well be that the time is coming to look at a new way of doing it. No date or direct decision has been made but it's under review".

In September 2005, it was announced that the BBC were working on a new set of idents to replace the dancers. A spokeswoman said "There is an idea for a change, but it is in very early days".

According to the Media Guardian, Fincham then confirmed that in autumn 2006, the 'Rhythm and Movement' idents would be replaced with a new presentation package, along with a new schedule. As speculated, Red Bee Media would create the new presentation package. Red Bee created the new idents for the ITV channels that were introduced in January 2006 (up until 2013). On 26 September the BBC confirmed that from 7 October 2006, the "Rhythm and Movement" idents would be replaced by a new Circle ident collection, including kites, surfers and hippos.

The idents aired for the final time on 7 October 2006, at 1:10 am, in which a montage of idents (with the exception of the 'Haka' and 'Tai-Chi (rotation)' idents) was aired together, ending with the rarely seen 'Ballet' ident. The new idents made their debut on 7 October 2006 at 9:58 am BST, marking the end of the "Rhythm and Movement" idents, which had defined the channel for four and a half years.

== See also ==
- History of BBC television idents

Preceded by Balloon globe idents	BBC television idents 29 March 2002 – 7 October 2006	Succeeded by Circle idents
