= BBC One "Circle" idents =

Channel identities used on BBC One

The Hippos ident

The BBC One "Circle" idents were a set of on-screen channel identities used on BBC One from 7 October 2006 to 4 December 2016. They also featured on the BBC Studios channel, BBC America. The idents contained images of circles being formed by nature, or people and their actions. This was the longest-lasting set of idents used by BBC One, as they remained in use for over 10 years.

== Launch ==
The Circles ident package was announced on 26 September 2006 as the replacement for the "Rhythm & Movement" idents that had been in use since March 2002. When BBC One channel controller changed to Peter Fincham, he hinted in August 2005 that the dancers would be changed soon. He announced at the Edinburgh International Television Festival that "It may well be that the time is coming to look at a new way of doing it. No date or direct decision has been made but it's under review".

The new idents would come into force alongside a revised schedule for the channel. The idents themselves were designed and produced for the BBC by Red Bee Media and marking the end of Lambie-Nairn's time at the BBC after fifteen years. Imran Hanif composed the original music for all idents, having been selected from a shortlist of 12 composers and bands.

== Components of look ==
All the idents revolved around a circular theme and all featured a scene which is revealed to end in a circle formation. The circle symbol was decided upon as a "symbol of unity", but it was also a "nod" towards the channel's heritage and in particular, the classic globe icon used in various styles for much of its history. The idents would involve people, plants or animals moving, or whose interaction causes a circular shape, which is revealed at the end of the ident. The circle would then be emphasised by white lines and a red eclipse animating around it and revealing the BBC One logo at the end. The new BBC One logo featured a large lower case "one" in the centre of the circle, with a smaller BBC logo to the upper left of the "one". The channel uses this logo on its idents and promotions, however uses a box logo, similar to the last look, for promotions where the BBC One logo appears alongside other channels. This boxed logo features the BBC logo above the lower case "one" in a red box. The box closely relates to the logos of BBC Two and BBC Four.

As with the previous look, no clock ident was used, a trend repeated across nearly all other channels in the UK, however the "Generic", "Helicopter", "Capes" and "Kites" idents may also be used for introduction into the news, following criticisms in the previous look that the dancers did not have an ident suitable for this purpose.

Promotion style featured the BBC One logo appear at the bottom of the screen, similar to the 1997 look, before switching to the centre of a shaded red end-board, with the logo appearing in the centre. Static slides, now very much a rarely seen occurrence, featured the image as a cut out eclipse in the right hand side of the screen.

In July 2008, the "Kites", "Moon", and "Windows" idents were dropped, but the "Kites" ident was reinstated on 2 May 2009.

On 2 May 2009, all the idents were made shorter and the animation of the lines were red with new adaptations of the original Imran Hanif music, with the exception of "Generic", "Hippos" and "Surfers". The May 2009 idents were composed by David Arnold.

=== Idents ===
Title	Air dates	Description
Bikes	7 October 2006 – 4 December 2016	A group of three motorcycle stunt riders ride the "wall of death". Filmed at Shepperton Studios and directed by Stuart Douglas, the ident features a lot of fast-paced film work, as well as a slowed down top down shot of the motor cyclists.
Football	7 October 2006 – 4 December 2016	Filmed at the Haberdashers Estate in North London and directed by Howard Greenhalgh, a circle of footballers kick their balls in time into the centre, so smaller rings form inside the circle of players. Usually used to introduce sports programming, as well as Weekend News bulletins before the 2009 revamp.
Hippos	7 October 2006 – 4 December 2016	Numerous hippos swim around in a circular formation. Produced using a combination of computer animation and live action backgrounds and directed by Charlie Mawer (Red Bee Media) and Mike McGee (Framestore CFC), this ident was edited for length in May 2009, but the soundtrack remains the same. This ident was mostly used prior to entertainment or daytime programming.
Kites	7 October 2006 – July 2008; 2 May 2009 – 4 December 2016; 7 September 2017	A group of kite flying enthusiasts gather together to create a circle effect with their kites. Filmed at Ynyslas beach in Wales and directed by Matthias Hoene, it was both the first and last in this new package of idents to be aired. This ident was withdrawn around July 2008 but was brought back in May 2009 with a more upbeat soundtrack. This ident is often used to introduce the BBC News. Despite the "Circles" package being taken out of rotation on 4 December 2016, this ident was mistakenly used to introduce Reggie Yates: Hidden Australia on 7 September 2017.
Ring-a-Roses	7 October 2006 – 4 December 2016	Also known as Petals, a group of children are shown playing with the natural flowers in a meadow before joining hands to form a "ring-a-roses" dance. Filmed in Coton, Northamptonshire and directed by Stuart Douglas. This ident was often used to introduce CBBC and CBeebies before they stopped airing on BBC One in 2012, and until 2016, it was commonly used to coincide drama based programmes.
Moon	7 October 2006 – July 2008; 4 October – 4 December 2016 (in Northern Ireland)	People in fishing boats come together to form the moon out of separate sections. Filmed at the Kamenjak peninsula in northern Croatia and directed by Howard Greenhalgh, it was often used to introduce the BBC News, particularly late bulletins. This ident is one of three idents that have been withdrawn. It was reintroduced in Northern Ireland on 4 October 2016.
Surfers	9 October 2006 – 4 December 2016	Carlos "Coco" Nogales and others ride a huge wave before crashing down after formation of the BBC One logo. Filmed at Puerto Escondido, Oaxaca on the west coast of Mexico and directed by Howard Greenhalgh. First shown in the Northern Ireland region on the first day of the "Circles" package, and later on the network on 9 October 2006. This was the only ident not to be edited in the May 2009 refresh, only difference is that the logo appears earlier.
Windows	9 October 2006 – July 2008	Residents on a housing estate use their windows to reflect sunlight into a ring. Filmed at the Greenwich Millennium Village in South East London and directed by Matthias Hoene. First shown in the Northern Ireland region on the first day of the "Circles" package, and later on the network on 9 October 2006. This ident was withdrawn in 2008 and was often used to introduce daytime programming.
Magic Forest	16 June 2007 – 4 December 2016	The natural world and a group of fairies come together to create a circle in the middle of the sunlit woodland. Directed by Matt Losasso. This ident was originally scheduled to air for the first time on Saturday 19 May; its launch was deferred for one month. Before the 2009 refresh, a slightly shortened version of this ident was used to introduce the BBC News.
Mission Control	16 June 2007 – 4 December 2016	A group of British scientists successfully launch a pod to land on a distant planet. Out of the pod emerges a curious rover that begins drawing circles on the face of the planet. Whilst the robot spins, a shadow of a circular spaceship glides into the robot's circle, making a perfect fit, and exits at the same speed not stopping and soon comes off camera. Filmed at Shepperton Studios and directed by Matt Losasso.
Lawn Circles	14 July 2007 – 4 December 2016	A group of suburban housewives each mow a series of crop circles into their lawns using a variety of mowers from different time periods, which form three large circles when viewed from above. Filmed in a residential garden in Netherne-on-the-Hill, near Reigate and Banstead, Surrey.
Neon	13 October 2007 – 4 December 2016	Neon figures come to life, stroll down the centre street and take a ride on a ferris wheel. Shot in Blackpool, the ident was conceived and scripted by James Spence for Red Bee Media and animated by Brand New School, New York City. A shorter version also exists, with the last scene of the wheel, and the BBC soundtrack. The ident was originally used before programmes during Saturday evenings only, however this became a regular ident when it was edited in May 2009.
Generic	3 December 2007 – 30 May 2018	A red arc spins around the BBC One logo on a red background. The music used is taken from the now-retired Windows ident. Only used to introduce the BBC News 90 second bulletin at 8pm. In Northern Ireland, an extended version of this ident exists since New Year's Day 2015, but the soundtrack was replaced with 'Enjoy 2015' ident music, and used to introduce a variety of programmes. Despite the "Circles" package being taken out of rotation on 4 December 2016, this ident was withdrawn in May 2018 due to the 90 second bulletin being axed by the BBC.
Helicopter	1 January 2008 – 4 December 2016	An aerial shot of a helicopter landing on the top of Bishop Rock lighthouse in the Isles of Scilly. Three variations of the ident were launched including slower paced versions and shortened opening films. The soundtrack for this ident was the most sombre when launched, featuring a lone choir singer as its soundtrack, however since May 2009 the soundtrack was changed dramatically to be more upbeat. This ident often precedes BBC News.
Penguins	5 February 2008 – 4 December 2016	Originally the Christmas ident for 2007, penguins enter and skate around an ice rink with other skaters. Altered for everyday use, it was aired without Christmas decorations and a new soundtrack based on Imran Hanif's original composition and definitive three note signature counter tune. The 2009 edit saw the music being edited again. It was used frequently, but not exclusively, during the winter period.
Capes	24 August 2008 – 9 January 2017	Numerous people in colourful rain coats on bikes ride through a rain storm, as people watch, the sun comes out. The final shot shows all the bikers forming a rainbow-like circle at a roundabout. Filmed on public roads in London and a private car park at Earls Court. Directed by Matt Losasso. A sting of the ident was used before all BBC One programmes shown on the BBC iPlayer and was often used to introduce the BBC News. Despite the "Circles" package being taken out of rotation on 4 December 2016, this ident was still used to introduce Panorama on 9 January at 20:30, due to the lack of a suitable ident for the replacement Oneness idents.
Dog Display	29 August 2008 – 4 December 2016	A pack of dogs doing circles tricks, including jumping through fire hoops, jumping over fences and weaving in and out of sticks laid out in a circle which then produces the "BBC One" animation. Filmed in the garden of a stately home in Wrotham Park in Hertfordshire and directed by Matt Losasso.
Pedal Power	27 July 2009 – 5 May 2014	Numerous people use pedal power to light up the circle around the BBC One logo, displayed on a red board in the field. Directed by Grant Gee, this ident was launched to coincide with the first programme of Bang Goes the Theory. When the programme was cancelled on 5 May, this ident became out of date and was withdrawn.
World Cup	11 June 2010 – 4 December 2016	Also known as Stadium and Banners, spectators at a football match stand up and wave different colour banners in a circle pattern. This ident was introduced for use during the 2010 FIFA World Cup. This ident was directed by Matt Losasso, and was used prior to sport programmes.
Television Centre	20 November 2010 – 31 March 2013	400 members of the public dance in the circular courtyard of BBC Television Centre. It was launched to introduce Strictly Come Dancing, but has since been used to introduce other programming as well. When Television Centre closed down on 31 March, this ident became out of date and was withdrawn.

=== Special idents ===
In addition to the usual set of idents used throughout the year, numerous other idents have been added for special occasions, both nationally and in the nations and regions. Some of these are included below.

==== Christmas ====
Title	Air dates	Description
Snowball	2006: 16 – 31 December 2006; 2007: 15 – 31 December 2007	A community coming together to build a giant snowball. Filmed in Greenwich using various sized polystyrene snowballs, the largest of which was 6 metres (20 ft) high. The ident first aired on Saturday 16 December at around 18:00, finishing in the early hours of New Year's Day when the original idents were restored. This ident was revived for Christmas 2007 to run alongside the Penguins which also debuted on Saturday 15 December, and was last shown introducing Weatherview on New Year's Day 2008 around 02:20.
Penguins	15 – 31 December 2007	3D animated penguins skate round the decorated ice rink alongside human skaters. Filmed at an ice-rink in Romford. The ident first aired on Saturday 15 December at 18:10, and was last seen before linking into BBC News 24 on New Year's Day at 02:25. The ident was re-introduced in February 2008 as a regular ident.
Wallace and Gromit's Runaway Sled	13 December 2008 – 1 January 2009	Wallace and Gromit were the subject of the Christmas ident this year, due to their new short A Matter of Loaf and Death debuting on Christmas Day. Gromit is seen pushing Wallace up a hill on a sled before Wallace slides down the other side of the hill and lands head deep in snow. Gromit then takes his place, performing tricks on the sled as it slides round the circular indented hill containing the BBC One logo. Written by Rachel Webb and James Spence and created by Aardman Animations using stop frame animation, the ident first appeared at 18:10 on 13 December. There are different versions of the ident: in one version, Wallace can be heard talking, whereas he is silent in another. A version was also made which preceded news and serious programming had slightly slower music, did not feature the characters and cut straight to the circle in view. The ident was last aired at 2:00 a.m. on 2 January 2009.
Doctor Who	12 December 2009 – 2 January 2010	David Tennant, as the tenth incarnation of the Doctor from Doctor Who, was the theme that year to mark the Doctor Who story "The End of Time", which would be Tennant's last appearance as the Doctor. The ident package first aired on 12 December at 18:45. The ident sees the Doctor walking through a snowy forest, and using a herd of reindeer to pull his TARDIS free from the snow and to use it as a sleigh. A news ident was also created featuring a darker sky, a slightly more sombre tune, and all traces of Doctor Who removed. Another version was created for the second part of "The End of Time", featuring Tennant doing a voiceover introduction in character as the Doctor. It used the same version of the music as the news ident. The Doctor Who ident last aired in the early morning of 2 January 2010.
Christmas Lights	11 December 2010 – 1 January 2011	An ident showing people enjoying Christmas on the streets and turning on Christmas lights on the houses in a circular cul-de-sac. Filmed in Hillingdon. Variations featuring different starting films were used, as was a news version which went straight into the circular ending with slower music and the lights on the roofs don't turn on and off. The ident was first aired at 18:00 on 11 December, and was last seen in the early hours of New Year's Day 2011 introducing the BBC News Channel.
Consider Yourself One Of Us	10 December 2011 – 1 January 2012	A mixture of idents were used this Christmas. The main ident featured many celebrities who would be featuring in programmes on the channel that Christmas, such as Sir Bruce Forsyth, Michael McIntyre, David Jason, Brendan O'Carroll, Lee Mack, Frank Skinner, Alexander Armstrong, Tess Daly, Lenny Henry, Alex Jones, Matt Smith, Karen Gillan, a Cyberman, Graham Norton and the Outnumbered kids (Tyger Drew-Honey, Daniel Roche, Ramona Marquez) in a homefront setting with a crackling fire, singing Consider Yourself from the Broadway musical Oliver. After all the celebrities have appeared they all stand in a circle. The backdrop then disappears to reveal a snowy landscape with carol singers and sledgers gathering round them. They all sing together and look up into the sky. The circle is blurred out and large snowflakes start to fall from the sky as the logo forms. A news version was made, which cut straight to the blurred-out circle. Other shortened versions were made, which showed some of the celebrities, before cutting to a cake to make the circle. All variants featured instrumental music used in the main ident. The ident package originally debuted as a trailer 30 November after programmes until the ident was first shown on Saturday 10 December at 17:35. A version was made to promote The Gruffalo's Child movie, with the two main characters playing in the snow. The same music is used. The Gruffalo also appears in the window in the main "Consider Yourself" advert, looking at Tess Daly and Lenny Henry. The main ident is currently the longest in ident history as the actual feature runs for 1:15 before the logo appears. The whole package was last used in the early hours of New Year's Day 2012, the original idents were restored the next morning.
It's Showtime	11 December 2012 – 1 January 2013	Reflecting the theme of the channel's promotional trailers for this Christmas season, the ident features a long line of sparkly dust forming a Christmas tree on the backdrop of a show curtain before forming the BBC One circle, with the BBC One logo itself re-painted in a shade of gold for the first time in the history of these idents. A second ident, to be used before the news, replaces the tree with an already-drawn snowflake that morphs into the BBC One logo and removes the background music. A longer version of the "Snowflake" variant, with background music was later introduced, along with an additional ident that used fireworks as the backdrop to reflect the New Year. Special variants were also used to precede the Network Television Film Premieres of Shrek Forever After (featuring Shrek), The Princess and the Frog (featuring Prince Naveen as a frog) and Up (featuring Russell). The main idents featured Rob Brydon as a producer backstage, trying to get all the stars ready, including the casts of Mrs. Brown's Boys, Call the Midwife, Doctor Who, Britain's Got Talent winners Ashleigh and Pudsey, the child cast of Outnumbered, Lee Mack and Miranda Hart. First shown at 19:30 on Tuesday 11 December and was last used in the earlier hours of 2 January 2013. The regular idents were restored the next day with the addition of "Love 2013".
Have A Wonderful Christmas	7 – 31 December 2013	A sparkly-looking BBC One logo is drawn up on a sheet of wrapping paper, reflecting the theme used in the channel's promotional trailers for the festive season. Four versions were created for the look: one with robins on the paper, angels either side of Christmas trees, a kaleidoscope snowflake, and another that featured reindeer. A fifth variant was later introduced featuring baubles with the Toy Story characters inside, to reflect that the channel had all three films from the Toy Story series being shown over Christmas (The third one was served as Network Television Film Premiere on Christmas Day). A silent version of the snowflake ident (with just the sound effects) is used ahead of the news. At first, the Capes and Kites variations from the normal Circles ident set were used ahead of the news. First shown at 19:10 on Saturday 7 December, and was last used just before 23:15 on Tuesday 31 December. The regular idents and presentation were restored the following day with the addition of "Love 2014".
Christmas Trees	6 – 31 December 2014	A set of idents based around popular TV shows being broadcast over the Christmas period, shown as Christmas trees. Three versions have been created, a blue TARDIS tree for Doctor Who, a glitterball tree with a dancing fairy for Strictly Come Dancing, and a cake tree with gingerbread men decorations for The Great British Bake Off. These idents consist of people coming together in a forest to decorate individual trees, then panning out, revealing the circular formation of the trees. A shortened version that features just the forest of trees is used to precede the news and other serious related programming (e.g. The Queen's Christmas Day Message). A festive version of the song "To Love Somebody" by the Bee Gees is used within the package. These idents were first shown at 20:15 on Saturday 6 December 2014 and was last used at 23:15 on Wednesday 31 December with the glitterball tree being the last one used. Later on at 00:30, a month long set of presentation entitled "Enjoy 2015" was used.
Sprout Boy	1 – 31 December 2015	2015 saw the BBC launch their festive idents with the story of Sprout Boy as "not the most loved Christmas vegetable". The short story is narrated by Peter Capaldi, as Sprout Boy goes all over to find someone to like him, until he stumbles upon a gathering of BBC all-star cast, as he is shown to be part of the group and is welcomed by all. The ident was first shown on Tuesday 1 December around 19:30 after The One Show was aired. The all-star BBC cast were all done in CGI animation, including Sprout Boy himself, and was developed by ad agency RKCR/Y&R. The CGI cast include Capaldi (as the Doctor from Doctor Who), Benedict Cumberbatch and Martin Freeman (as Sherlock Holmes and Dr. Watson from Sherlock), will.i.am (from The Voice), Idris Elba (as John Luther from Luther), Mary Berry (from The Great British Bake Off), Graham Norton (from The Graham Norton Show), June Brown (as Dot Cotton from EastEnders) and Tess Daly and Claudia Winkleman (from Strictly Come Dancing). Other variations featured the titular character pulling a cracker with a gold ring landing on his head and another where he falls over whilst writing a gift tag and gets a bow ribbon stuck to his back. A variation featuring just a forest background with lanterns was used to precede the news and the Queen's Royal Christmas Message. A version featuring the city skyline was used only on BBC One Northern Ireland to precede the news, but it was also used as a "Coming Next" message on all the BBC channels. The presentation was last used on Thursday 31 December at 23:30, linking into Bryan Adams Rocks Big Ben Live. The regular idents were restored immediately afterwards, at 00:45 on 1 January 2016.

==== Other ====
- Daffodils – 1 March 2007 – 2012, 2013–2016 – A special Saint David's Day ident used on BBC One Wales only. This ident used the "Moon" ident music from 2007 to 2009; from 2010 onwards this was replaced by the edited "Ring-a-Roses" ident music.
- BBC Won Wales 2008 – February 2008 – Ident seen on BBC One Wales to celebrate Wales' win over England in the 2008 Six Nations Championship. This ident uses the "Bikes" ident music and reads "BBC Won" instead of "BBC One".
- Robert Burns – 25 January 2009 – Shown to commemorate the 250th anniversary of the birth of Robert Burns, this ident features two mice circling on an untidy heap of manuscripts, in reference to a poem by Burns, To a Mouse. Seen on BBC One Scotland only.
- Ashes to Ashes – April to July 2009 & 2010 – Used to promote the second and third series of Ashes to Ashes, it featured the characters of the programme seated in an Audi Quattro set in 1982. It premiered on 11 April 2009 and was directed by Tim Pope and conceived by James Spence and Joe Lee.
- Glitterballs – November to December 2009 – Ident promoting and shown directly before Strictly Come Dancing. In this ident, the circle is centred around a glitter ball and uses a variation of the show's theme music as the ident's background music. First shown on 7 November and not seen after 12 December 2009. A new version, with gold glitterballs instead of the original silver, debuted on 23 September 2016 with the same music.
- EastEnders – February to September 2010 – Also known as Albert Square. This ident promoting EastEnders' 25th anniversary, it features the regular cast members looking in amazement as the Albert Square turns into Albert Circle. Written and Directed by James Spence, it was first aired on Monday 15 February on the 25th Anniversary week, and continued to air at the start of most of the programmes to celebrate the 25th Anniversary year. This ident was last aired on 10 September following set changes as part of a story arc, namely the fire at the Queen Vic pub. The ident was reintroduced in September 2015 to be shown before every episode of EastEnders, albeit a shorter version, as many of the characters featured in the original no longer appear in the show.
- House of Fun – Ident promoting the new Saturday night schedule consisting of Over the Rainbow, Doctor Who and Total Wipeout. Features cartoon versions of Graham Norton, Charlotte Church, the Eleventh Doctor and Richard Hammond representing each programme respectively. Created by Aardman Animations, it was used on Saturday Nights from 24 April to 19 June 2010.
- Planet Dinosaur – Ident promoting the new dinosaur documentary series Planet Dinosaur. The ident uses an edited clip from the programme; a Camptosaurus is seen eating plants whilst the camera moves to reveal an Allosaurus, whose zoomed in eye is where the logo forms. It was used between 14 September 2011 and 19 October 2011, which was the series' run.
- Wild Week – An ident used on the Wild Week season on BBC One Northern Ireland. The ident focuses on a duck and uses the Magic Forest ident music.
- Frozen Planet – An ident used to introduce and promote the Frozen Planet documentary series. A group of penguins are seen. The logo forms around the sun. It was used between 26 October 2011 and 28 December 2011, which was the series' run.
- Planet Earth Live – An ident used to introduce and promote Planet Earth Live. Similar to Frozen Planet, the earth is seen, before the camera zooms in, to reveal a desert with birds and elephants.
- St David's Day 2012 (Story of Wales) – Shadows of people walking towards the sunset are shown. Only seen 1 March 2012 on BBC One Wales. The soundtrack is the original unedited music from Magic Forest.
- Love 2013 – The BBC One logo gives way to a rippling background upon which is written 'LOVE 2013'. A variation was also made for spring entitled Love Spring.
- Africa – The BBC One logo appears on top of an African night sky, and separately on a flock of flamingoes.
- BBC Won Wales 2013 – An aerial view camera zooms in onto the Millennium Stadium. A rugby ball can be seen flying out of the stadium, leaving behind it a trail of smoke. The camera pans around 180 degrees and after a firework explodes, "BBC Won Wales" appears. March 2013.
- BBC Onesie – A bunch of people dressed up in onesies walk up some curved stairs. "BBC Onesie" appears. Used to link in Comic Relief 2013 back from BBC Two after the 10 O'Clock News.
- The Voice UK – Special ident to introduce the second series of the talent competition, The Voice UK, in 2013. The four coaches (Danny O'Donoghue, Jessie J, Tom Jones and will.i.am) are seen in their revolving chairs before the camera rests on the view of the stage from behind the microphone.
- Love 2014 – Similar to the Love 2013 ident, but with a different soundtrack. The BBC One logo gives way to a rippling background with the words 'LOVE 2014' written inside a heart shape. First used at 00:30 on New Year's Day 2014.
- Torchwood: Children of Earth – It begins with many different idents, but while it zooms back, it eventually lost its signal (like the TV would do), which was replaced with things from the Torchwood series in glitches and the "O" of the logo was replaced by the split "O" from the Torchwood logo.
- Commonwealth Games 2014 – Panoramic views of some of the venues of the 2014 Commonwealth Games in Glasgow are seen before the camera rests on the roof of the SSE Hydro where the BBC One logo forms. The music from the "Capes" ident is used. Introduced the channel's coverage of the Games from 23 July to 3 August. Scotland continues to use this ident until 4 December 2016.
- Life Story – This special ident is used from 23 October to 27 November 2014 features the male pufferfish creates an amazing display of circles to attract females where the BBC One logo forms. It was used to promote the coverage of the epic six-part Nature documentary, Life Story narrated by David Attenborough.
- Enjoy 2015 – Various items and themes related to the month of January, such as high street store sales and a fireplace are shown before the BBC One logo appears on a plain red background, with a mug of cocoa in the "O" of the logo. Another ident showing the two people riding at the ice skaters and the gloves showing the two are shown before the BBC One logo appears on a plain red background, with birds eating a suet ball that forms the "O" of the logo. First seen at 00:30 on New Year's Day 2015 and was last used airing into BBC News on 1 February 2015.
- Rio 2016 – In this ident, an anteater is swinging a wooden hammer in the Amazon rainforest. This ident was used for the 2016 Summer Olympics in Rio. First seen on 5 August 2016 and it was last seen on 21 August 2016.
- Planet Earth II – These three idents are introduced to promote the six-part nature documentary Planet Earth II, in the first ident, mountains are staying still and it changes the sky from daytime to night-time during the Time-lapse (with clouds drifting away and turns into stars at night), in the second ident, two Nubian ibexes are walking steadily across the steep of rocky mountains, female ibex is supported by a young male ibex to follow the tracks as the camera zooms slowly to see some Nubian ibexes walking the rocks, and the final one, a band of flamingoes strides quickly towards the single flamingo in the water, albeit with an audio is the same as "Glitterballs", but more joyous than the other two idents. First aired on 6 November 2016 and it was last aired on 4 December 2016.

In addition to the idents above, some modifications were made to existing idents to promote other programmes. A chameleon, which caught and ate a fairy, was added to the Magic Forest ident to promote Life in Cold Blood in February 2008; and to promote the BBC One Wales series Rolf Harris on Welsh Art, the Magic Forest ident was again modified to have a paint like appearance. In addition to this, red noses were added to some of the hippos in the Hippos ident for Comic Relief programmes in 2007 and 2009, and an animated Pudsey Bear was added to the Ring-a-Roses ident for the BBC Children In Need appeal for 2010. A modified version of Mission Control was made for the Doctor Who episode The Bells of Saint John with the end of the ident appearing as if it had been hacked into by the Great Intelligence, and the TARDIS was also seen used floating underwater in the Hippos ident. In preparation for the 50th Anniversary special of Doctor Who, The Day of the Doctor, various idents throughout November have featured a rewind effect, with the Eleventh Doctor intruding and informing the viewer that "the clock is ticking". A similar modification was made in August 2014, to promote, and which featured, the first episode to involve the Twelfth Doctor.

== BBC America ==
All of the idents were also used on BBC America, the BBC's outlet in the United States. The BBC America versions of the idents featured the words "One World" (a slogan of BBC America that debuted in the spring of 2007) in the same font and position as the "One" in the BBC One logo before animating itself into the then-current stacked BBC America logo. These idents were cut down compared to the original British versions, however they retained their original soundtrack when the British versions were changed in May 2009. In May 2008, the "One World" slogan has been removed from all idents. This branding launched on 28 April 2008, and would remain until 2011.

== Replacement ==
After a little over 10 years in use, the "Circle" idents ceased at the end of 2016, with their final appearance on 4 December 2016, although some were used in January 2017.

The presentation was replaced by the 'Oneness' idents, created by Martin Parr, essentially continuing on from the theme of the Christmas idents from 2016; as such, the Christmas idents that year could have been seen as a preview to the full new look that was revealed in the night on New Year's Day 2017.

== See also ==
- History of BBC television idents

Preceded by Rhythm & Movement	BBC television idents 7 October 2006 – 4 December 2016	Succeeded by Oneness
