= Jasmine Bligh =

British television presenter (1913–1991)

Jasmine Bligh

Jasmine Lydia Bligh (20 May 1913 – 21 July 1991) was an English broadcaster and television announcer for the BBC. In the late 1930s, she was one of the first three BBC Television Service presenters, and she, along with Leslie Mitchell and Elizabeth Cowell, delivered continuity announcements introducing programmes in-vision. When the BBC's regular television service debuted in November 1936, Bligh was its first female announcer.

Prior to joining the BBC, she appeared in revues and films. Bligh left the BBC in 1946 to become a farmer in the Republic of Ireland but returned in the 1950s to present programming for deaf children and announce on BBC Radio. She presented the Thames Television daily magazine show Good Afternoon in 1973 and ran a second-hand mobile clothing business from 1967 until 1976.

== Early life and career ==
Bligh was born to an upper class family in London on 20 May 1913 to Noel Bligh. She was the niece of Esme Ivo Bligh, the 9th Earl of Darnley and was a descendant of Captain William Bligh, the commander usurped during the Mutiny on the Bounty in the 18th century. Her sister, Susan, was a model. Bligh participated in school amateur theatricals and evensong.

Bligh's mother was opposed to her plans to become an actress. She did, however, become a Charlot showgirl at the Cambridge Theatre in London when she was 17 years old. Bligh appeared in revues, cameos in films, and Shakespeare plays. She visited France, Italy, Switzerland and the United States. She appeared in Julius Caesar at His Majesty's Theatre and the Charlot revue Please!, among other London productions. After declining to become a debutante, her mother tore up her contract but agreed to a compromise to be presented in court if she may continue acting.

== Television career ==
In 1936, Bligh was struggling as an actress and responded to a BBC advertisement for female television 'hostess-announcers' - unmarried and without red hair. Both Bligh and Elizabeth Cowell were chosen from a pool of 1,122 applicants throughout the British Empire. On 18 May 1936, she began a six-month trial with the BBC's television department, making her BBC Radio debut, announcing halfway through Geraldo's light entertainment orchestral concert Romance in Rhythm for around 15 seconds in St. George's Hall, London on the evening of 26 May 1936. Bligh was included in the programme because television director Gerald Cock needed her to get experience. She did a microphone training course with musical comedy and opera producer Gordon McConnel, and was formally employed as a BBC television announcer in July 1936. Bligh was one of three BBC television test broadcast announcers.

On 7 July of that year, she made her BBC Radio début as part of a team with Cowell and Leslie Mitchell. From late June to early July 1936, Bligh worked as one of the BBC's evening hostesses at Broadcasting House for a week. She was the first woman to announce on the BBC's regular television broadcast, which debuted on 2 November 1936. In an era before autocues or prompting systems, Bligh was obliged to learn 400 words per day that she said straight into the camera.

She also worked as a roving reporter for BBC Outside Broadcasting. Bligh was televised live in a careening motorbike sidecar missing one of its wheels in 1938, and she broadcast live from the air in a autogyro above Hanworth Air Park, Middlesex in February 1939. She was also filmed being rescued from atop a 100 ft (30 m) ledge during a fire brigade drill and performing trick motorbike manoeuvres with the police. This earned Bligh the sobriquet "Pearl White of television."

From September 1939, British television broadcasting was suspended because of the Second World War, but she rejoined the service in 1946 when television broadcasts resumed after the war was over and she was the first person to appear when broadcasting was resumed, greeting viewers with the words:

"Good afternoon everybody. How are you? Do you remember me, Jasmine Bligh?"

After twenty minutes she introduced the Mickey Mouse cartoon Mickey's Gala Premiere (1933), which had been the last programme shown before the embryonic service closed in September 1939. She resigned from the BBC in June 1946, two weeks after television broadcasts resumed, citing "too strenuous" work. Bligh moved to the Republic of Ireland to become a farmer, but found it too expensive and ultimately returned to England.

Later, in the 1950s, she presented the BBC's ''Television for Deaf Children'' and the lunchtime programme ''About the Home''. Bligh compered fashion shows on and off television, became a BBC Radio announcer, and narrated the Noddy television series of books. When her third husband became ill in 1967, she set up the one-person mobile second-hand clothing shop Bargains to earn some money and toured the Berkshire countryside in a red van, doing business at agricultural and dog shows, Women's Institute meetings, military camp quarters and housing estates. In September 1973, Bligh returned to television, presenting the daily magazine programme Good Afternoon for Thames Television, which explored emotional and physical disabilities. She closed down Bargains in 1976.

== Personal life and death ==
She was married three times. Bligh was first married to Sir John Paley Johnson, 6th Bt from 1940 to 1947. They had a daughter. She married secondly in 1948, Frank Fox; they divorced in October 1953 on grounds of cruelty by her husband. She was later married to broadcaster Howard Marshall from 1954 to his death in 1973. In 1981, a severe stroke left Bligh with a speech impairment and she was cared for at Denville Hall in Northwood, London. She died of undisclosed causes in London on 21 July 1991.
