= BBC One =

British television network

- Logo used since 2021
- Country: United Kingdom
- Broadcast area: United Kingdom, Isle of Man, and Channel Islands, reaching bordering regions via overspill of the British terrestrial network
- Network: BBC Television
- Headquarters: Broadcasting House, London, England

Programming
- Language: English
- Picture format: 1080i/1080p (Note: 1080p25 sometimes on Freeview only) HDTV (downscaled to 576i for the SDTV feed); 2160p UHDTV (ongoing trials, available on BBC iPlayer for certain programmes only)

Ownership
- Owner: BBC
- Sister channels: BBC Two; BBC Three; BBC Four; BBC News; BBC Parliament; CBBC; CBeebies; BBC Scotland; BBC Alba

History
- Launched: 2 November 1936; 90 years ago
- Former names: BBC Television Service (2 November 1936 – 7 October 1960); BBC Television (8 October 1960 – 19 April 1964); BBC1 (20 April 1964 – 3 October 1997)

Links
- Webcast: BBC One on BBC iPlayer (UK only)
- Website: bbc.co.uk/bbcone

Availability

Terrestrial
- Freeview: Channel 1 (SD); Channel 101 (HD)
- Other providers: See dedicated section

BBC One is a British free-to-air public broadcast television channel owned and operated by the BBC. It is the corporation's oldest and flagship channel, and is known for broadcasting mainstream programming, which includes BBC News television bulletins, primetime drama and entertainment, and live BBC Sport events.

The channel was launched on 2 November 1936 under the name BBC Television Service, which was the world's first regular television service with a high level of image resolution. (Note: It used the Marconi-EMI 405-line all-electronic television service and, for the first three months, the Baird 240-line intermediate film system. Germany introduced television with a medium level of image resolution (180 lines) in 1935, initially based on intermediate film, but fully electronic by 1936.) It was renamed BBC Television in 1960 and used this name until the launch of the second BBC channel, BBC Two, in 1964. The main channel then became known as BBC1. The channel adopted the current spelling of BBC One in 1997.

The channel's annual budget for 2024–2025 was £1.28 billion. It is funded by the television licence fee together with the BBC's other domestic television stations and shows uninterrupted programming without commercial advertising. The television channel had the highest reach share of any broadcaster in the United Kingdom as at 2019, ahead of its traditional rival for ratings leadership ITV. In 2013, a study conducted across 14 countries by the polling organisation Populus found BBC One to be the station most favourably viewed by its country, with BBC Two coming in third place.

== Availability ==
BBC One is available via most major television providers in the United Kingdom.

=== Terrestrial ===
- Freeview: Channel 101 (HD), Channel 1 (SD)

=== Satellite ===
- Freesat: Channel 101 (HD)
- Sky: Channel 101 (HD)

=== Cable ===
- Virgin Media: Channel 101 (HD)

=== IPTV ===
- Sky Glass/Sky stream: Channel 101 (HD)
- Freely: Channel 1 (HD)

=== Streaming ===
- BBC iPlayer (UK only)

== History ==
=== Early years and launch ===
The BBC began its own regular television programming from the basement of Broadcasting House, London, on 22 August 1932. The channel officially began regular broadcasts on 2 November 1936 at three o'clock in the afternoon from a converted wing of the Alexandra Palace in London.

Initially, programmes ran from three o'clock to four o'clock in the afternoon and nine o'clock to ten o'clock in the evening. Television director Gerald Cock described his rationale for the timings of the service as to "avoid eye strain" for home viewers in breaks between programmes, and to have a five-hour break between both periods in order not to interfere with home routines, such as mealtimes and children's bedtimes. The BBC also depended on newsreels from other companies as it did not have a television news service of its own until 1948.

At 12:35 pm on 1 September 1939, two days before Britain declared war on Germany, the station was taken off air with little warning, with the last programme to be shown being a Mickey Mouse cartoon (the 1933 short Mickey's Gala Premier); the government was concerned that the VHF transmissions would act as a beacon to enemy aircraft that could bomb London.

BBC Television returned on 7 June 1946 at three o'clock in the afternoon. Jasmine Bligh, one of the original announcers, made the first announcement, saying, "Good afternoon everybody. How are you? Do you remember me, Jasmine Bligh?". Twenty minutes later, BBC Television again aired the Mickey Mouse cartoon that they had broadcast in 1939. This was done in time for the London Victory Celebrations of 1946 to be broadcast the next day. It carried the 1948 Summer Olympics, which tested the limits of new television equipment, the most ambitious outside broadcast that the BBC had ever done to date. The channel was made available outside of London for the first time on 17 December 1949, when the Sutton Coldfield transmitting station in the Midlands opened. The BBC hoped for the service to reach 70% of the British population by 1952, then 80% by 1954. The BBC made its first cross-country broadcast on 27 August 1950, crossing the English Channel in cooperation with its French counterpart RTF in Calais, lasting for one hour. From this experiment, the term "Eurovision" was coined, which was later adopted by the European Broadcasting Union as the name of its network, which in 1954 was already fully operational.

=== Creation of BBC1 ===
The BBC held a statutory monopoly on television broadcasting in the United Kingdom until Associated-Rediffusion, the first Independent Television (ITV) station, began to broadcast on 22 September 1955. Lord Reith, which had long left his position at the corporation, compared its introduction to a plague at the House of Lords. While Reith's predictions did not come to pass, BBC Television's viewing share fell down to less than 30% by the end of the decade.

The competition quickly forced the channel to change its identity and priorities, following a large reduction in its audience, as noted in the 1962 Pilkington Report on the future of broadcasting. Simultaneously, the Pilkington Report decided to award an additional television station to the BBC on the basis that ITV was in comparison lacking in serious programming.

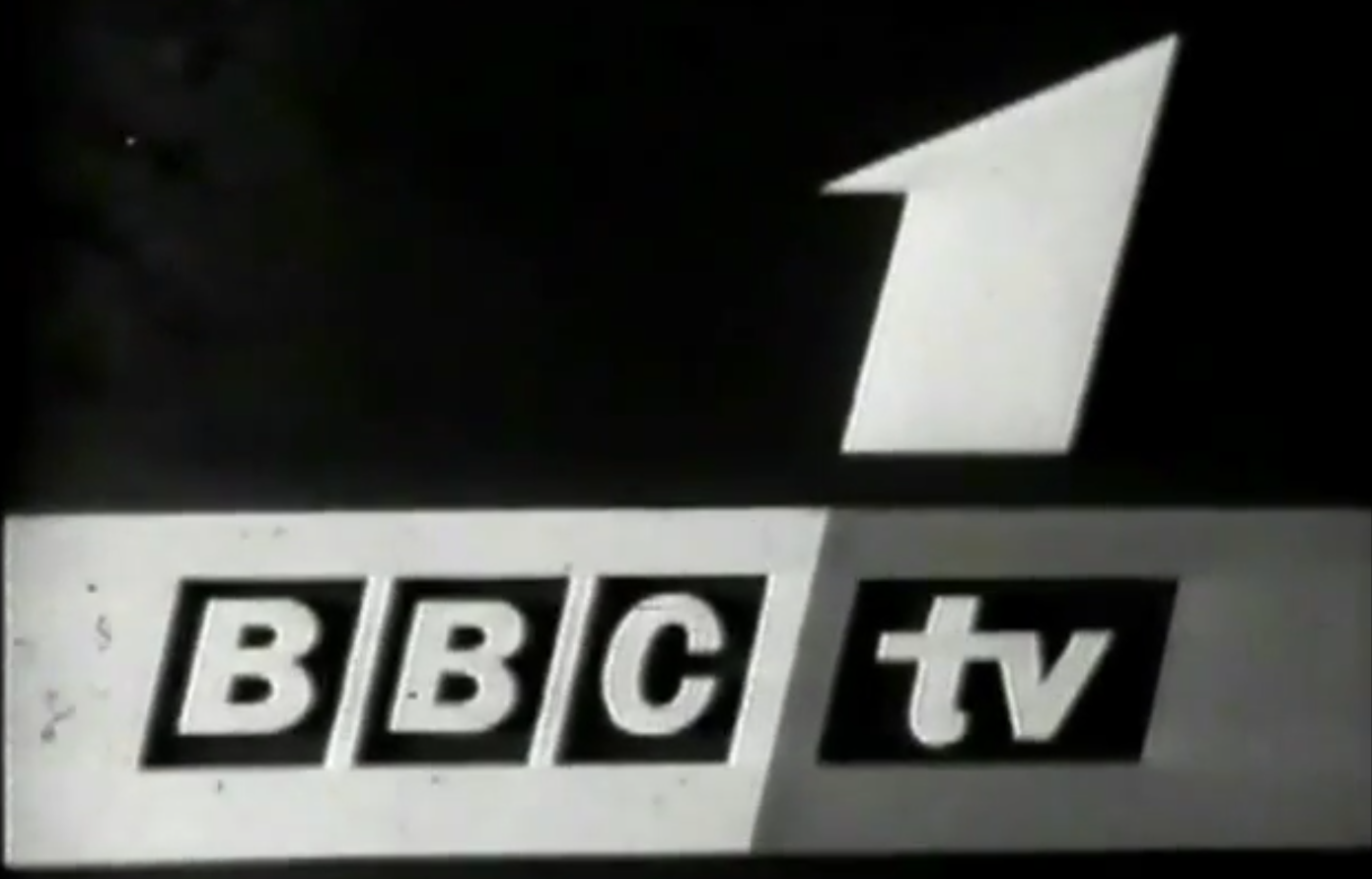
Logo used in 1964

BBC Television became BBC1 when BBC2 launched on 20 April 1964, transmitting an incompatible 625-line image on UHF. The only way to receive all channels was to use a complex "dual-standard" 405- and 625-line receiver with both a VHF and a UHF aerial (405-line-only sets became obsolete in 1985 when VHF transmissions ended). BBC1 moved to purpose-built facilities at Television Centre on 20 September 1969. Television News continued to use Alexandra Palace as its base and by early 1968 had even converted one of its studios to colour. In the weeks leading up to 15 November 1969, BBC1 unofficially transmitted the occasional programme in its new colour system in order to test it. At midnight on 15 November, simultaneously with ITV and two years after BBC2 had done so, BBC1 officially began 625-line PAL colour programming on UHF with a broadcast of a concert by Petula Clark. Colour transmissions could be received in monochrome via monochrome 625-line sets until the end of analogue broadcasting.

Competition tactics with ITV flared up again in the early 1970s, when the channel opted to air its key sitcoms at 7:30 pm, countering Coronation Street (at the time airing two nights a week) and related drama series. During the early years of BBC2, some programmes made for the channel were repeated on BBC1, attracting higher attention there, such as The Forsyte Saga when it gained a repeat on this channel. Between 1973 and 1977, BBC1 achieved an average audience share of 45% under Bryan Cowgill. This was the channel's most successful period in terms of audience share.

On 30 December 1980, the BBC announced plans to introduce a new breakfast television service to compete with TV-am. They stated that the new show would be broadcast before TV-am but included the caveat that the new show would not launch until at least November 1981, whereupon new licence fee income could finance the necessary extension of broadcasting hours. On 17 January 1983, one year after originally planned, the first edition of Breakfast Time was shown on BBC1, becoming the first UK wide breakfast television service and continued to lead in the ratings until 1984.

=== Michael Grade era (1984–1987) ===
In 1984, Bill Cotton become managing director of Television at the BBC, and set about overhauling BBC1, which had been slated with poor home grown shows, its heavy reliance on US imports, with Dallas and The Thorn Birds being BBC1's highest rated programmes and ratings being over 20% behind ITV. Cotton recruited Michael Grade to become Controller of BBC1 from 1 September 1984 the first time the corporation had recruited someone outside of the BBC, replacing Alan Hart.

The first major overhaul was to axe the unpopular Sixty Minutes current affairs programme: this was a replacement for the news and magazine show Nationwide. Its replacement was the BBC Six O'Clock News, a straight news programme in a bid to shore up its failing early evening slot. It was believed the BBC were planning to cut short the evening news and move more light entertainment programming in from the 18:20 slot, but this was dismissed. The Miss Great Britain contest was dropped, being described as verging on the too offensive after the January 1985 contest, with World's Strongest Man and International Superstar also being cancelled.

BBC1 was relaunched on 18 February 1985 with a new look, new programming including Wogan and EastEnders, and a revised schedule to help streamline and maintain viewers throughout the course of the evening. Grade started to gear most programmes to either on the hour or half past the hour, while Panorama and Omnibus were both moved after the Nine O'Clock News. Grade was also determined to end the dated and inept BBC1 scheduling which was hampering the channel and holding back good programmes. Grade said "When I took over BBC1, I discovered there were wonderful things, it was just a case of where to put them." Wogan had been scheduled for a 10 pm slot, but Grade moved it to a 7 pm slot as he believed the show had potential.

From February to August 1985, a high number of American mini-series were broadcast while filming took place of a number of new home grown programmes, including 'Allo 'Allo!, In Sickness and in Health, and Open All Hours. Further improvement came about when the corporation strengthened its drama output costing £30 million, with eight new series, including Howards' Way, All Creatures Great and Small, Hold the Back Page, and Bluebill, along with the return of Bergerac and Big Deal. The increase in the drama department was achieved by switching the money away from the administrative service over a three-year period, after BBC1 was criticised for failing to match ITV's output in drama. EastEnders was moved to a 19:30 slot, where it managed to soar to 20 million, helping the BBC1 audience share increase to nearly 50% for the first time since 1982.

On 27 February 1985, Doctor Who was placed on an 18-month hiatus. The BBC originally planned to axe the series as they wished to spend its budgets on new programming for the channel, but was forced to back down from public pressure and Doctor Who returned in September 1986. At the time Michael Grade and Jonathan Powell were blamed for the decision (Grade was the target of death threats).

On 9 September 1985, the long-standing children's programming block was overhauled and rebranded as Children's BBC, which gave it dedicated idents for the first time and had a live in-vision presenter, similar to rival ITV's Children's ITV block which had been running since January 1983. Previously the BBC had broadcast children's programming using BBC1's team of regular duty announcers. The launch presenter for this block, and thus the first Children's BBC presenter of the current format, was Phillip Schofield.

On 23 May 1986, long-running lunchtime magazine show Pebble Mill at One was broadcast for the last time after being on air for 14 years. On 27 October 1986, BBC1 launched its daytime television schedules. In a statement, BBC Daytime head Roger Laughton said:

It was the natural extension of the corporation's commitment to public service broadcasting, since half the population had access to television during the day mainly the retired, unemployed and housewives.

=== 1990s ===
Logo used from 1991 to 1997

Stereo audio transmissions, using the NICAM digital stereo sound format began on BBC1 in late 1987, to coincide with the sale of the first consumer NICAM-enabled equipment, a year after BBC2, and were gradually phased in across BBC TV output, although it took until 31 August 1991 for the service to begin officially on both channels. During this time, both commercial analogue broadcasters, ITV and Channel 4 had officially begun stereo transmissions using the BBC-developed NICAM system. Widescreen programming was introduced on digital platforms in 1998.

For the first 50 years of its existence, with the exception of films and programmes purchased from the United States and elsewhere, almost all the channel's output were produced by the BBC's in-house production departments. This changed following the passing of the Broadcasting Act 1990, which required that 25% of the BBC's television output be out-sourced to independent production companies. By 2004, many popular BBC One shows were made for the channel by independents, but the in-house production departments continued to contribute heavily to the schedule.

In March 1991, as part of the £63 million programme package for spring and summer line up on BBC1, it was announced an extra £20 million was to be spent on rejuvenating the channels drama and comedy output during peak times, to keep the channel in a healthy state once the new Channel 3 licences were awarded.

In December 1991 Wogan was to be cancelled, due to falling ratings against a number of ITV shows, in which Wogan only managed six million viewers compared to double that for This Is Your Life, The Krypton Factor and The $64,000 Question. Additionally an extra £40 million a year was spent on narrowing the gap on ITV's ratings lead, since a few months prior to this the channel had been criticised for its Autumn schedule, having tired formats, uninspiring scheduling of new programmes and poor scripts. Wogan was replaced with Eldorado, in early July 1992, but this was itself cancelled a year later.

Alan Yentob launched the 1993 Autumn schedule calling it "My first try with a lot of help from my friends", with the channel still under criticism, following the start of new programming which Alan introduced a year earlier, and the number of summer repeats. £175 million was spent on 80 hours of original drama produced, enchantment to the arts with an extended 26-week run for Omnibus, and documentaries with The Downing Street Years, new wildlife series and an eight-month look at Sheffield's Children's hospital, while Goodnight Sweetheart, Grace & Favour and The Danny Baker Show were new comedy series. Lois & Clark: The New Adventures of Superman included in the Saturday night line up to increase variety.

Following the public disapproval of filling its schedule with 25% of repeats during the summer months of 1993, BBC1 agreed to broadcast an extra 110 hours worth of original programming over the same period during the summer in 1994, which included giving EastEnders an additional episode per week. Efficiency savings of £25 million were found and redeployed to the new productions. The savings were seen as a vindication for Producer Choice, the controversial internal market introduced in April 1993.

Logo used from 1997 to 2002

By March 1999, the channel admitted defeat in its ratings war with ITV, with its spring line up emphasising more on serious factual and educational programmes, and drama. This change in strategy came about after continuing complaints that the channel was appealing to the lowest common denominator to increase viewership. Reliance on docusoaps and the dropping of the vilified Noel's House Party were chastened by the hoax guests on The Vanessa Show. Alan Yentob said "The spring package is to remind people of what the BBC is here for, range and ambition you won't find anywhere else at peak time". The changes helped the channel distinguish itself from (as one BBC executive said) "its down-market rival and would not compete for viewers on ITV's terms."

=== 2000s ===
Lorraine Heggessey became Controller of BBC One, a post she took up on 1 November 2000. She had previously been sounded out about the job in 1997 following Michael Jackson's departure, but had turned down the opportunity as she felt she was then not yet experienced enough.

During Heggessey's five years in charge, BBC One's audience share fell by 19.9%, to 23%, although this was in the context of declining audience figures across all British television channels due to increased competition from multichannel digital television. However, in 2001 BBC One overtook its main rival ITV in terms of annual audience share for the first time since the rival channel had launched in 1955, although much of this was down to the success of the channel's daytime television line-up, which had its own Controller: Jane Lush.

When Heggessey arrived at the channel in November 2000, she inherited two controversial schedule changes which had been implemented the previous month, at the behest of Director-General of the BBC Greg Dyke; the Nine O'Clock News had been moved to the later time of 22:00 and Panorama moved from Monday night prime time slot to a later slot on Sunday nights. The moving of Panorama attracted criticism that BBC One was sidelining serious programming in favour of more populist output. Heggessey publicly defended the decision, despite it not being hers, claiming that Panorama's ratings would have "dwindled" in its previous slot.

Heggessey and the BBC's Controller of Drama Commissioning, Jane Tranter, took advantage of the weekday 21:00 slot opening up by moving the news to commission new popular drama output, such as the successful Waking the Dead (2000–2011) and Spooks (2002–2011). Celebrity dancing show Strictly Come Dancing (2004–present) was also a popular success on Saturday nights, although another Saturday night entertainment series, Fame Academy, faced accusations of being too derivative of the output of commercial rivals, and during Heggessey's era the channel frequently came under attack for being too populist and not providing enough serious programming.

Logo used from 2002 to 2006

Immediately after her arrival, Heggessey ordered a review of the "Balloon" idents the channel had been using for its between-programme idents since 1997. In her opinion, the balloon was "slow and distant" and so, on 29 March 2002, after much speculation, she decided to abandon the "Balloon" idents (and the traditional "Globe" idents the channel had used in a variety of forms since 1963). They were replaced by a new style of on-air identity for the channel, the "Rhythm & Movement" idents. The new idents attracted criticism for going against the traditions of the channel and pandering to "political correctness", as they featured activities performed by people of various ethnicities. The abandonment of a station clock, and perceived lack of a 'serious ident', also put the BBC in an embarrassing situation just one day into the new look with the death of the Queen Mother.

One of Heggessey's most notable decisions and last major success at the channel was the recommissioning of the science-fiction drama series Doctor Who, which had been a popular hit in previous decades but ceased production in 1989. Heggessey and Jane Tranter recommissioned the series in September 2003, after Heggessey had spent two years persuading the BBC's commercial arm, BBC Worldwide, to abandon their attempts to make a feature film version of the programme and allow it to instead return it to BBC One. The new version of Doctor Who (2005–present) debuted on 26 March 2005 and became a critical and popular hit, with Paul Hoggart of The Times newspaper describing the series as "a joyful, exuberant reinvention and a fine legacy from Ms Heggessey."

Heggessey did later concede in a 2005 interview with The Independent newspaper that arts programming had suffered a cutback under her control of BBC One. However, she did respond to this omission following criticism from the Board of Governors of the BBC by commissioning programmes such as the arts documentary series Imagine... (2003–present) and A Picture of Britain (2005).

On 14 February 2005 it was announced that Lorraine Heggessey was to leave the BBC to take up the post of Chief Executive at production company Talkback Thames. She left on 15 April. Five months after her departure, BBC One was named "Channel of the Year" at the Edinburgh Television Festival, primarily on the strength of Heggessey's commissions such as Strictly Come Dancing and Doctor Who.

Joining the channel as Controller in 2005, Peter Fincham oversaw the commissioning of several successful BBC One programmes including Robin Hood (2006–2009), Jane Eyre (2006) and How Do You Solve a Problem like Maria?, which was followed by similar shows Any Dream Will Do and I'd Do Anything because of its success. His first full year in charge of the channel saw a year-on-year growth in the audience share, with a rise from 22.2% in August 2005 to 23.6% in August 2006.

Fincham also directly initiated the creation of both The One Show (2006–present), an early evening, current-affairs and lifestyle magazine programme, which now runs all but two weeks of the year, and Davina (2006), a prime time chat show, the latter hosted by Davina McCall, who presented Big Brother. However, Davina was a critical and ratings disaster, which Fincham subsequently admitted was personally his fault, although he defended the strategy of experimenting with the BBC One schedule. This he continued in January 2007, when he moved the current affairs series Panorama from its Sunday night slot back to the prime time Monday evening slot from which it had been removed in 2000, most likely in response to a demand from the Board of Governors of the BBC for the channel to show more current affairs programming in prime time.

Fincham's judgement was again called into question, this time by The Telegraph, for his decision to spend £1.2 million replacing the channel's 'Rhythm and Movement' idents, which had been introduced by his predecessor Lorraine Heggessey several years earlier, with the 'Circle' idents, a set of eight ten-second films, some of which were shot abroad in locations such as Mexico and Croatia. Fincham later found himself having to publicly defend the £18 million salary that the BBC paid Jonathan Ross in 2006, although Ross's BBC One work—primarily consisting of Friday Night with Jonathan Ross—formed only part of his overall BBC commitment.

The channel was named Channel of the Year at the 2007 Broadcast Awards.

=== The One to Watch campaign ===
Following its rebrand in March 2002, BBC One launched The One to Watch campaign, during which animated blocks created the word "The" and moved into the BBC logo. Each new campaign incorporating the theme retained the same animated sequence.

Logo used from 2006 to 2021

In May 2007, Fincham decided to drop Neighbours, an Australian soap opera, from BBC One after 21 years on the channel, when its producers, FremantleMedia significantly raised the price they wanted the BBC to pay for it in a bidding war. Fincham commented that it was 'a big loss', but that BBC One would not pay 'the best part of £300 million'. Neighbours left the channel after the BBC's contract to show the programme ended on 8 February 2008, and moved to Channel 5 on 11 February 2008. The Weakest Link was moved from BBC Two to fill the gap, with the afternoon CBBC slot moving 20 minutes earlier.

There was further controversy in July 2007 when Fincham was accused of misleading BBC One viewers. The incident involved a clip from forthcoming documentary A Year with the Queen which was shown to journalists during a press conference. It apparently showed the Queen storming out of a session with American photographer Annie Leibovitz over a disagreement about what she should wear, but the BBC subsequently admitted that the scenes used in the trailer had been edited out of their correct order, meaning that a false impression was given. Fincham admitted the error, but rejected calls that he should resign from his position as a result. His future was deemed uncertain following critical comments from Sir Michael Lyons, Chairman of the BBC Trust, and he resigned on 5 October 2007.

In 2009, a report published by the BBC Trust found scheduling changes had led to a decrease in viewers. This was especially noticeable for Blue Peter and Newsround, two of CBBC's flagship programmes; Blue Peter which recorded its lowest viewing numbers since it started in 1958, and Newsround with fewer than 100,000 viewers compared to 225,000 in 2007.

=== 2010s ===
An image of 'Digit Al' sitting on the last BBC1 mechanical ident, taken from the last analogue BBC One Northern Ireland transmission on 23 October 2012 at 23:31 GMT

As part of the Delivering Quality First proposals submitted by the BBC in October 2011 and approved by the BBC Trust in May 2012, all children's programming on BBC One and Two would be moved permanently to the CBBC and CBeebies channels following the digital switchover. It was found that the majority of child viewers watched the programmes on these channels already and that only 7% of these children watched CBBC programmes on BBC One and Two only, it was made clear "Children's programmes are absolutely fundamental to the BBC and that is why we have protected investment in them in the light of cuts elsewhere." Children's programming on BBC One ended on 21 December 2012. The move was criticised by Teletubbies co-creator Anne Wood, who described the changes as "ghettoising children's programmes" and believe it was merely a cost-cutting measure. Wood said "On the one hand it is inevitable. But it is dismissive of children. There is a certain amount of overlooking of the fact that children's programmes do get a wider audience than people are aware of ... I have frequently had letters from older people who have enjoyed my programmes as much as children do. A lot of the reason older people like to watch children's programming is because it is life-enhancing." Head of BBC Children's, Joe Godwin said: "Our young viewers are our priority and the vast majority of children in the UK already tune in to CBeebies and CBBC to find their favourite BBC children's programmes. Far from being a 'cynical' move, we're just following where our audience has already gone."

As part of the review in 2012 other changes were brought in, including:

- BBC One is reducing the minimum hours of arts and music from 45 to 40, achieved through cutting episodes of shows, in particular Film 2013.
- BBC One and Two will "largely be protected from making significant cuts".
- Repeats on BBC One will increase, but remain under 10% of all output (the current rate is 8.4%).
- Expenditure on sports rights will be cut by 15%. This had largely been achieved already by sharing rights to Formula 1 coverage from 2012 (it was later dropped entirely from 2016).

In 2012, the BBC out-bid ITV for the rights to air a British version of Dutch TV talent show The Voice. The BBC paid £22 million for the rights to broadcast the show in the UK for two years. The Voice UK achieved good ratings for the BBC but ratings dropped towards the end of the first series and the second series. In 2013, The Voice UK was rescheduled to avoid a clash, and as a result, ratings have improved. In November 2015, it was announced that The Voice UK would be moving to ITV from 2017, especially because of the ITV plc ownership of franchise owner, Talpa Media.

== Sister channels ==
=== BBC One +1 ===
On 8 October 2013, the BBC announced plans to launch a one-hour time shift of the channel, named BBC One +1. The channel would have replaced BBC Three in 2016. However, on 30 June 2015, the BBC Trust rejected the plans for a BBC One +1 channel as they stated that it would be at the expense of commercial rivals.

=== BBC One HD ===
BBC One HD logo (2010–2021)

BBC One HD, a simulcast of BBC One in 1080i high definition (HD), launched on 3 November 2010 at 19:00 with The One Show. The channel simulcasts the national version of BBC One in High Definition, with HD versions of programmes including Doctor Who, Holby City, The One Show, Strictly Come Dancing and The Apprentice. EastEnders was also made available in HD from Christmas Day 2010. All programmes still made in standard definition were upscaled on the channel, with the intention that by 2012 the vast majority of the channel's output would be in high definition. On 30 May 2012, the satellite and terrestrial resolution was increased to full HD.

BBC One HD at launch did not offer regional variations, and therefore the channel could not broadcast during regional programming slots, most noticeably the local news programmes. The BBC Trust admitted that this was due to technical and financial constraints, but the BBC announced on 6 June 2011 that the national variations of BBC One Northern Ireland, BBC One Scotland and BBC One Wales, would become available from 2012. On 24 October 2012, Northern Ireland received the first variation. A Scottish variation launched on 14 January 2013, followed by a Welsh variation on 29 January 2013. On 16 July 2013, the BBC indicated that it also wants to launch regional variants of BBC One HD across England; however, this would require the approval of the BBC Trust, with a proposal due to be presented within six months. On 18 November 2013, the Northern Irish regional variant of BBC One HD was swapped with the SD channel on Sky's EPG for HD subscribers. This was followed by the Welsh and Scottish variants on 10 December. On 24 March 2014, BBC One Scotland, Wales and Northern Ireland HD launched on Freesat, Sky and Virgin Media outside the regions they were originally seen in.

On 31 March 2016, BBC One HD in England moved from channel 141 on the Sky electronic programme guide to channel 115, a position vacated by BBC Three, which had been switched to internet-only six weeks earlier. Changes in Scotland, Wales, and Northern Ireland were also scheduled but delayed for 'technical reasons' and eventually BBC Two HD was moved to channel 115 in those regions.

==== Regionalised BBC One HD launch ====
On 22 November 2022, the BBC announced that BBC One would finally be regionalised on their HD channels. This move started on Sky Glass, followed by Virgin Cable, and then in the 2023 new year, HD programmes were launched on satellite. With the launch of the HD channels, this also meant the closure of the SD channels. SD channels were shut on satellite 24 hours after the launch of the HD channel, and were moved up to the Channel 1/Channel 101 slot on the EPG. Viewers with older standard definition set-top boxes would no longer be able to receive BBC One. All BBC satellite channels in standard definition closed on 8 January 2024.

BBC Alba HD, BBC Red Button 1 HD and BBC Parliament HD also launched on satellite at a similar time. The BBC and Freesat launched a website with a guide, telling users how to make sure they are upgraded at www.hdsatelliteupgrade.co.uk.

Regional programming began on BBC One HD in certain regions on 22 March 2023; it began in the remaining regions on 26 April 2023, as well as regionalised versions launching on Freeview that same day.

== Contemporary programming ==
BBC One's remit is to be the BBC's most popular mixed-genre television service across the UK, offering a wide range of high quality programmes. It should be the BBC's primary outlet for major UK and international events and it should reflect the whole of the UK in its output. A very high proportion of its programmes should be original productions.

— BBC One remit

Excluding sporting events and news coverage, the top five most watched programmes at their peak viewing points (according to BARB) were:

Rank	Show	Episode	Number of viewers (millions)	Date
1	EastEnders	Den divorces Angie.	30.15	25 December 1986*
2	EastEnders	New Year Episode – Sharon is stalked.	28.00	1 January 1987*
3	Only Fools and Horses	"Time on Our Hands"	24.35	29 December 1996
4	EastEnders	Everyone is telling Mark to tell Michelle about his illness.	24.30	2 January 1992*
5	EastEnders	Michelle tells Den that she is pregnant.	24.15	7 January 1988*

With a mission to provide programmes for all licence-fee payers, it has sport, news, current affairs, and documentaries. It has historically broadcast children's programmes (now taken from CBBC and CBeebies). The channel remains one of the principal television channels in the United Kingdom and provides 2,508 annual hours of news and weather, 1,880 hours of factual and learning, 1,036 hours of drama, 672 hours of children's, 670 hours of sport, 654 hours of film, 433 hours of entertainment, 159 hours of current affairs, 92 hours of religion and 82 hours of music and arts.

Since 1990, the BBC has had to commission output from other domestic suppliers. Although the statutory target remains 25% for independent production companies to contribute programming for BBC One, 33% of output was made by them in 2010–11. The quota of original programming in peak times is set at 90%; however, 100% of peak programming was original in 2010–11. Over the whole day, the total for the same year was 89%, against a quota of 70%.

2,508 annual hours of news and weather (293 in peak, 1,049 of BBC News simulcasts) are provided by regular news programmes BBC News, BBC Business Today, BBC Newsday, Sportsday, BBC Breakfast, the BBC News at One, BBC News at Six and the BBC News at Ten each including BBC regional news programmes. All three main news bulletins have a lead over their rival programmes on ITV and other terrestrial or cable channels. During the weekend period, three separate bulletins around these three time periods are broadcast and vary in length from 10 to 25 minutes. BBC One has broadcast overnight simulcasts from the BBC News Channel since 1997; the latter in turn simulcasts the majority of all regular BBC One bulletins. When BBC One is broadcasting a BBC News special, it hands some of its daytime programming to BBC Two.

Each year 159 hours of current affairs programmes are broadcast on BBC One, including Panorama and Watchdog. Politics is also covered, with programmes including Question Time and This Week shown. Crimewatch, a programme appealing for help in unsolved crimes, is broadcast monthly.

BBC One shows 1,880 hours of factual and learning programming annually. This includes a wide range of shows such as nature documentaries such as Planet Earth as well as lifestyle-format daytime programmes and a number of reality television formats and the One Life strand.

BBC One broadcasts 1,036 hours of drama each year, more than any other BBC channel. There are four half-hour episodes of EastEnders each week (not shown on Friday), plus the hospital drama Casualty. Other popular dramas on BBC One include crime dramas such as New Tricks, a programme of which even episode repeats have beaten ITV ratings on numerous occasions.

BBC One has traditionally been the home of children's television: Blue Peter had been broadcast on the channel prior to the Children's BBC strand, and sections such as the pre-school Watch with Mother being transmitted on the channel for several decades. This became more pronounced with the launch of Children's BBC, later renamed "CBBC". This new strand was broadcast primarily on BBC One in the late afternoons, as well as Saturday and Sunday mornings also such as Going Live! and Live & Kicking, each lasting two to three hours. The launch in 2002 of dedicated digital channels for this content —the CBBC and CBeebies channels —did not affect this provision. Combined with BBC Two, the channel broadcast 2,195 hours of children's programmes in 2010, mostly in the late afternoons on weekdays. Saturday morning children's programming moved to BBC Two in 2006 following a three-month trial.

Sports coverage on BBC One includes Premier League football highlights on Match of the Day, the Wimbledon Championships, the London Marathon, and other international athletics and swimming events, the Olympic Games, Rugby league, Rugby Union, Snooker tournaments, the American Super Bowl, and more.

The BBC showed the 2010 FIFA World Cup, splitting the group stage matches with ITV. The BBC had first pick of matches from the second round. Repeats made up 8.4% of peak programming in 2010–11, up from 8.0% for 2008–09. Programming on this channel costs an average of £162,900 per hour.

British and international films are broadcast for 654 hours each year on BBC One. This is mainly late-night fillers with some box office hits at Christmas and holiday periods. Sometimes on a Saturday afternoon there is a film on to fill the gap between entertainment shows but very rarely has there been one in that slot.

Entertainment programming on BBC One includes game shows such as the National Lottery, Total Wipeout, Strictly Come Dancing and chat shows such as The Graham Norton Show.

The annual 92 hours of religious programming comprise weekly editions of live Songs of Praise, Christian services and other shows from independent production companies. Mentorn Oxford produces Heart and Soul, described as "a new multi-faith programme featuring a panel and a studio audience", followed by Life from the Loft which is made by the Leeds-based company True North. In 2005 BBC One was criticised for reducing the amount of religious programming, previously 101 hours per year.

BBC One broadcasts many comedy programmes, often on Friday nights. These have included the stand-up comedy show Live at the Apollo, sitcom Outnumbered, and satirical quiz show Have I Got News for You. Saturday evening is also a popular slot for a comedy show such as Michael McIntyre's Big Show and The Armstrong and Miller Show.

Since BBC Three became an online-only service in 2016, BBC One broadcast some BBC Three programming, particularly such as People Just Do Nothing, Cuckoo, RuPaul's Drag Race UK and This Country. In March 2019, BBC1 had a dedicated timeslot for BBC3 as a programming block. The block was dropped when BBC Three returned as a linear TV channel in early 2022, but BBC One continues to broadcast some BBC Three programmes.

As the weekly popular music chart programme Top of the Pops was dropped in 2006 (except for the Christmas Day edition), BBC One broadcast 49 hours of music and arts programming in 2010. The majority of this was Imagine, presented by Alan Yentob, and classical music concerts, in particular some of the BBC Proms.

BBC One's daytime line-up was a major factor in it overtaking ITV as the most popular channel in 2000, a position it has retained, even though ITV achieves a higher audience share during the daytime. The morning daytime line-up consists of lifestyle shows, such as Morning Live, Homes Under the Hammer and Bargain Hunt, the afternoons contain drama with daily soap Doctors and classic US drama, such as Diagnosis: Murder. Sometimes a drama such as Land Girls is shown in the afternoons.

Between 15:25 and 17:35 was the CBeebies/CBBC broadcasting strand, with its own visual identity. Historically, BBC One's most popular daytime programme was Neighbours, with audience figures approaching five million. On 11 February 2008, BBC One dropped Neighbours and the programme was broadcast on Channel 5 until 2022. In its place was the quiz show The Weakest Link, which was moved from BBC Two, and later replaced in 2011 by Pointless. Children's programmes were broadcast from 15:05 – 17:15 to accommodate this change and this continued until December 2012 when the afternoon CBeebies/CBBC block was axed.

On 16 May 2012, the BBC announced the children's block of shows would be moved permanently to CBBC and CBeebies upon the completion of the Digital switchover. In its place appear the game show Perfection, plus Escape to the Country and Put Your Money Where Your Mouth Is.

In February 2022, the BBC confirmed that EastEnders will get a Monday to Thursday slot at 7:30 pm with the programme due to form part of a BBC soap hour which will include a repeat of daytime soap Doctors on BBC Two at 7 pm. Due to this decision, the BBC One regional slot will be pushed back half an hour to 8 pm on Wednesdays, where it will feature programmes such as documentary series We Are England.

== Presentation ==
The circle idents were introduced on 7 October 2006 and were used until 4 December 2016. The Hippos ident is shown above.

BBC One's identity has been symbolised by a globe shown on its idents for much of its existence. The first BBC ident was shown on 2 December 1953, known as the Bat's Wings. In 1962 this was replaced by a map of the UK shown between programmes, and in 1963 the globe appeared, changing in style and appearance over the next 39 years.

Most notably, on 18 February 1985, the "Computer Originated World" was introduced. This was a computer-animated globe with the land coloured gold and the sea a transparent blue, giving the impression of a glass globe. This was replaced by the "Virtual Globe" on 16 February 1991. On 4 October 1997, the globe became a red, orange and yellow hot-air balloon, coloured to resemble a globe. It was filmed flying around various places in the UK.

On 29 March 2002, the globe was replaced by a series of visual identities, "idents", consisting of people dancing in various styles. These were replaced on 7 October 2006 by the 'circle' idents. According to the BBC, the circle symbol both represents togetherness (unity) and acts as a link to the classic globe icon used for 39 years. They ran until 4 December 2016, when that year's Christmas idents launched. On 1 January 2017, a new ident set launched, based on the theme of "oneness". Following complaints from viewers on social media that the 2017 set of BBC One idents were not good examples of social distancing amid the Coronavirus Disease 2019 pandemic in the UK, BBC One temporarily suspended the 2017 idents on 1 May 2020 in favour of a special set of idents that adhere towards the social distancing guidelines. The idents were reinstated on 19 July 2021 when the UK government lifted some Coronavirus restrictions until the new Lens idents arrived the following year on 1 April 2022.

== Regional variations ==
BBC One is not one unified channel, but has several different feeds that form a television network. BBC One has individual continuity and opt-outs for Scotland, Wales and Northern Ireland. Each variant maintains the BBC One logo with the addition of the constituent country name beneath it.

In England, each region has an individual regional news and current affairs programme opt-out as well as a limited amount of continuity. UK Today, a news programme, was shown nationally to digital viewers in place of regional programmes when they were unavailable to broadcast on analogue television. The programme was discontinued in 2002 and replaced by a transmission of BBC London News until all BBC regions were made available digitally.

BBC One Scotland has the greatest level of variation from the generic channel, owing to BBC Scotland scheduling Scottish programming on the main BBC Scotland channel, rather than on BBC Two Scotland which closed in 2019. BBC One Scotland variations include the soap opera River City and the football programme Sportscene, the inclusion of which causes programming to be displaced or replaced.

BBC One Wales was considered a separate channel by the BBC as early as its launch in the mid-1960s, appearing as BBC Wales.

== Availability outside the UK ==
BBC One (Northern Ireland) is widely available in Ireland on cable and satellite television. BBC One (especially the London feed) is also available on cable and IPTV in the Netherlands, Belgium, Switzerland, Monaco and Liechtenstein. The channel is registered to broadcast within the European Union/EEA through the Luxembourgish Broadcasting Regulator – ALIA.

On 27 March 2013 it was offered by British Forces Broadcasting Service (BFBS) to members of HM Forces and their families around the world, replacing the BFBS 1 TV channel, which already carried a selection of BBC One programmes.

All feeds of BBC One in both SD and HD are broadcast unencrypted on the Astra 2E and 2G satellites, allowing viewing across Belgium, the Netherlands, the Republic of Ireland and parts of France, Germany and Spain.

== Accessibility ==
The BBC announced in May 2008 that it had achieved its aim for all programming to have subtitles for viewers with hearing difficulties. The BBC also offers audio description on some popular BBC One programmes for visually impaired viewers. The percentage of the BBC's total television output with audio description available is 10%, having been increased from 8% in 2008.

== Controllers of BBC One ==
- 1963–1965: Donald Baverstock
- 1965–1967: Michael Peacock
- 1967–1973: Paul Fox
- 1973–1977: Bryan Cowgill
- 1977–1981: Bill Cotton
- 1981–1984: Alan Hart
- 1984–1987: Michael Grade
- 1987–1993: Jonathan Powell
- 1993–1996: Alan Yentob
- 1996–1997: Michael Jackson
- 1997–2000: Peter Salmon
- 2000–2005: Lorraine Heggessey
- 2005–2007: Peter Fincham
- 2007–2008: Roly Keating (acting)
- 2008–2010: Jay Hunt
- 2010–2013: Danny Cohen
- 2013–2016: Charlotte Moore

In 2016, the controller of BBC One would be promoted to oversee all BBC channels, with the channel controller roles being entirely scrapped in 2020, in favour of a focus on digital streaming.

== See also ==
- History of BBC television idents
- Prewar television stations
- List of television programmes broadcast by the BBC
