= Lists of television programs =

This is a list of television shows and articles.

== By name ==
Alphabetically indexed lists of television programs
0–9	A	B	C	D	E	F	G	H	I–J
K–L	M	N	O	P	Q–R	S	T	U–V–W	X–Y–Z

This is an alphabetical list of television program articles (or sections within articles about television programs). Spaces and special characters are ignored.

== By year ==
Lists of television program related events indexed by year of release.

2020s
2020
2021
2022
2023
2024
2025
2026
2027
2028
2029

2010s
2010
2011
2012
2013
2014
2015
2016
2017
2018
2019

2000s
2000
2001
2002
2003
2004
2005
2006
2007
2008
2009

1990s
1990
1991
1992
1993
1994
1995
1996
1997
1998
1999

1980s
1980
1981
1982
1983
1984
1985
1986
1987
1988
1989

1970s
1970
1971
1972
1973
1974
1975
1976
1977
1978
1979

1960s
1960
1961
1962
1963
1964
1965
1966
1967
1968
1969

1950s
1950
1951
1952
1953
1954
1955
1956
1957
1958
1959

1940s
1940
1941
1942
1943
1944
1945
1946
1947
1948
1949

1930s
1930
1931
1932
1933
1934
1935
1936
1937
1938
1939

1920s
1920
1921
1922
1923
1924
1925
1926
1927
1928
1929

1910s
1910
1911
1912
1913
1914
1915
1916
1917
1918
1919

1900s
1900
1901
1902
1903
1904
1905
1906
1907
1908
1909

1890s
1890
1891
1892
1893
1894
1895
1896
1897
1898
1899

1880s
1880
1881
1882
1883
1884
1885
1886
1887
1888
1889

1870s
1870
1871
1872
1873
1874
1875
1876
1877
1878
1879

== By country ==
- List of Australian television series
- List of Austrian television series
- List of Brazilian television series
- List of British television programmes
- List of Bulgarian television series
- Lists of Canadian television series (includes English and French programs)
- List of Chinese television series
- List of Colombian television series
- List of Czech television series
- List of Danish television series
- List of Finnish television series
- List of French television series
- List of Greek television series
- List of Hong Kong television series
- List of Hungarian television series
- List of Icelandic television series
- List of Indian television series
- List of Italian television series
- List of Japanese television series
- List of Macedonian television series
- List of New Zealand television series
- List of Norwegian television series
- List of North Korean television series
- List of Pakistani television series
- List of Philippine television series
- List of Polish television series
- List of Portuguese television series
- List of Puerto Rican television series
- List of Romanian television series
- List of Russian television series
- List of Slovak television series
- List of South African television series
- List of South Korean television series
- List of Spanish television series
- List of Swedish television series
- List of Taiwanese television series
- List of Turkish television series

== By genre or characteristic ==
- Action series
- Anthology series
- Award shows
- List of animated television series
- List of BL dramas
- List of comedy television series
- List of comedy-drama television series
- List of cooking shows
- List of court shows
- List of dating game shows
- List of dystopian TV programs
- List of entertainment news programs
- List of fantasy television programs
- List of game shows
- List of GL dramas
- List of horror television programs
- List of late-night American network TV programs
- List of medical drama television programs
- List of morning television shows
- List of music video television programs
- List of police television dramas
- List of professional wrestling television series
- List of reality television programs
- List of reality television show franchises
- List of roast TV shows
- List of romantic comedy television series
- List of satirical television news programs
- List of science fiction sitcoms
- List of science fiction television programs
- List of serial drama television series
- List of situation comedies
- List of sketch comedy TV series
- List of soap operas
- List of sports television series
- List of superhero television series
  - List of American superhero TV shows
- List of tabloid talk shows
- List of tattoo TV shows
- List of teen dramas
- List of teen situation comedies
- List of telenovelas
- List of televised academic student quiz programs
- List of television game show franchises
- List of television news magazines
- List of television series about school
- List of television series revivals
- List of television show franchises
- List of vampire television series
- List of web television series
- List of Western television series

== By source ==
- List of television programs based on films
- List of television programs based on comics
  - List of TV series based on French-language comics
- List of television series based on video games
  - List of animated series based on video games
- List of television series based on toys

== By length ==
- List of animated television series by episode count
  - List of anime franchises by episode count
  - List of anime series by episode count
- List of longest-running Australian television series
- List of longest-running scripted American primetime television series
- List of longest-running television shows by category
- List of longest-running British television programmes
- List of longest-running American television series
- List of longest-running American cable television series
- List of longest-running American broadcast network television series
- List of longest-running American primetime television series
- List of longest-running American first-run syndicated television series
- List of most-watched television broadcasts
- List of television programs by episode count
- List of television series canceled before airing an episode
- List of television series canceled after one episode

== By location ==
- List of American television programs by setting:
  - List of television shows set in Boston
  - List of television shows set in Chicago
  - List of television shows set in Dallas
  - List of television shows set in Las Vegas
  - List of television shows set in Los Angeles
  - List of television shows set in Miami
  - List of television shows set in New Jersey
  - List of television shows filmed in New York City
  - List of television shows set in New York City
  - List of films and TV series set in Palm Springs, California
  - List of television shows set in San Diego
  - List of television shows set in San Francisco
  - List of television shows set in Wisconsin
  - List of television shows set in Washington, D.C.
- List of British television programmes by setting:
  - List of television shows set in Liverpool
  - List of television shows set in London
  - List of television shows set in Manchester
  - List of television shows set in Newcastle upon Tyne

== By studio ==
- List of Disney television series
- List of Lionsgate Television programs
- List of Metro-Goldwyn-Mayer Television programs
- List of NBCUniversal television programs
- List of Paramount Skydance television programs
- List of Sony Pictures Television programs
- List of Warner Bros. Discovery television programs

== Other ==
- List of television series considered the worst
- 50 Years 50 Shows
- List of American public access television programs
- List of web series
- List of American television programs currently in production
- List of Chinese television programs by date
- List of Japanese television programs by date
- Lists of television specials

== See also ==
- List of television formats and genres
