= List of years in television =

This is a list of years in television. It lists important events in the history of television, as well as the first broadcasts of many television shows, and launches of some television channels and networks.

== 1922–1925 ==
- 1922: Charles Francis Jenkins' first public demonstration of television principles. A set of static photographic pictures is transmitted from Washington, D.C. to the Navy station NOF in Anacostia by telephone wire, and then wirelessly back to Washington; Philo Farnsworth first describes an image dissector tube, which uses cesium to produce images electronically. Farnsworth will not produce a working model until 1927.
- 1923: Charles Jenkins first demonstrates "true" television with moving images. This time 48-line moving silhouette images are transmitted at 16 frames per second from Washington to Anacostia Navy station; Vladimir Zworykin applies for a patent for an all-electronic television system, the first ancestor of the electric scanning television camera. The patent is not granted until 1938 after significant revisions and patent interference actions.
- 1924: John Logie Baird demonstrates a semi-mechanical television system with the transmission of moving silhouette images in England; Vladimir Zworykin files a patent application for the kinescope, a television picture receiver tube.
- 1925: John Logie Baird performs the first public demonstration of his "televisor" at the Selfridges department store on London's Oxford Street; Charles Francis Jenkins achieves the first synchronized transmission of a moving silhouette (shadowgraphs) and sound, using 48 lines, and a mechanical system; Vladimir Zworykin applies for a patent for color television; Zworykin first demonstrates his electric camera tube and receiver for Westinghouse corporation executives, transmitting the still image of an "X"; John Baird achieves the first live television image with tone graduations (not silhouette or duotone images) in his laboratory. Baird brings office boy William Taynton in front of the camera to become the first face televised.

== 1926–1975 ==
- 1926: John Logie Baird demonstrates the world's first television system to transmit live moving images with tone graduations, to 40 members of the Royal Institution.
- 1927: The BBC begins broadcasting as the British Broadcasting Corporation under the Royal Charter.
- 1928: John Logie Baird's Television Development Company demonstrates their model A, B, and C 'televisors' to the general public.
- 1929: John Logie Baird begins broadcasting 30-minute-long programmes for his mechanically scanned televisions.
- 1930: Baird installs a television at 10 Downing Street, London, the British Prime Minister's residence. On July 14, Prime Minister Ramsay MacDonald and his family use it to watch the first-ever British television drama, The Man with the Flower in His Mouth.
- 1931: Allen B. DuMont perfects long-lasting reliable cathode-ray tubes later used for television reception. TV reaches the Soviet Union and France.
- 1932: The BBC starts a regular public television broadcasting service in the UK.
- 1933: The first television revue, Looking In, is broadcast on the BBC. The musical revue featured the Paramount Astoria dancing girls. Broadcast live by the BBC using John Logie Baird's 30-line mechanical television system, part of this performance was recorded onto a 7" aluminum disc using a primitive home recording process called Silvatone. This footage, which runs to just under four minutes, is the oldest surviving recording of broadcast television.
- 1934: First broadcast of The Three Stooges; Philo Farnsworth demonstrates a non-mechanical television system. The agreement for joint experimental transmissions by the BBC and John Logie Baird's company comes to an end. First 30 Line Mechanical Television Test Transmissions commence in April in Brisbane Australia conducted by Thomas Elliott and Dr. Val McDowall.
- 1935: First regular scheduled TV broadcasts in Germany by the TV Station Paul Nipkow. The final transmissions of John Logie Baird's 30-line television system are broadcast by the BBC. First TV broadcasts in France on February 13 on Paris PTT Vision.
- 1936: The 1936 Summer Olympics becomes the first Olympic Games to be broadcast on television.
- 1937: The BBC Television Service broadcasts the world's first televised Shakespeare play, a thirty-minute version of Twelfth Night, the For the Children programme and the first football match, Arsenal F.C. vs. Arsenal reserves.
- 1938: DuMont Laboratories manufactures and sells the first all-electronic television sets to the public. Baird gives the first public demonstration of color projection television. The BBC broadcasts the world's first-ever television science fiction (R.U.R.), and television crime series (Telecrime); in one of the lengthiest experimental television broadcasts, the BBC broadcasts a 90-minute version of Edmond Rostand's Cyrano de Bergerac, starring Leslie Banks, Constance Cummings, and James Mason.
- 1939: The BBC suspends its television service owing to the outbreak of the Second World War. The 1939 New York World's Fair was broadcast. Japan is the first Asian country to air television; NBC expands into television; An early televised broadcast of the Macy's Thanksgiving Day Parade is experimented on NBC.
- 1940: The American Federal Communications Commission, (FCC), holds public hearings about television
- 1941: First television advertisements aired. The first official, paid television advertisement was broadcast in the United States on July 1, 1941, over New York station WNBT (now WNBC) before a baseball game between the Brooklyn Dodgers and the Philadelphia Phillies. The announcement was for Bulova watches. CBS expands into television.
- 1942: FCC terminates all American television broadcasting because of the war; DuMont petitions FCC to resume broadcasting and receives approval.
- 1943: Hänsel und Gretel is the first complete opera to be broadcast on television, but only in New York; first (experimental) telecast of Charles Dickens's A Christmas Carol. Many more telecasts of the story will follow in later years, but until film begins to be used on television, no two of the television versions of the story will have the same casts. An advertisement campaign about forest fires introduces Smokey Bear
- 1944: First broadcast of At Home, The World in Your Home, and Will You Remember?.
- 1945: National Broadcasting Company (NBC) begins the first regularly scheduled television network service in the United States.
- 1946: RCA demonstrates all-electronic color television system, BBC resumed broadcasting through free-to-air BBC Television Service; the DuMont Television Network begins broadcasting.
- 1947: First broadcast of Howdy Doody, Kraft Television Theatre, Missus Goes a Shopping, Kukla, Fran and Ollie, and Meet the Press; the World Series is broadcast live for the first time; the 1947 Tournament of Roses Parade becomes the first televised parade.
- 1948: First broadcast of The Ed Sullivan Show and Texaco Star Theater; ABC expands to television; the Macy's Thanksgiving Day Parade moves from radio to television on CBS.
- 1949: First broadcast of The Lone Ranger, Time for Beany, and Mama; 1st Emmy Awards
- 1950: First broadcast of Come Dancing, You Bet Your Life, Broadway Open House, Andy Pandy, Your Show of Shows, Crusader Rabbit and What's My Line?; Cuba is the first Caribbean country to receive TV; Brazil is the first South American country to receive TV; Nielsen Media Research begins to provide television ratings data; Jack Benny and Burns & Allen move from radio to TV; Looney Tunes and Merrie Melodies cartoons begin airing on television after previously only being theatrical short films; Bob Hope appears in his first TV special.
- 1951: The first broadcast of live United States transcontinental television takes place in San Francisco, California during the Japanese Peace Treaty Conference. The first broadcast of I Love Lucy, See It Now, Dragnet, the Hallmark Hall of Fame, Watch Mr. Wizard, Search for Tomorrow, Sua vida me pertence, Love of Life and The Roy Rogers Show; the Code of Practices for Television Broadcasters is first issued.
- 1952: First broadcast of Today (NBC), Garfield Goose and Friends, I've Got a Secret, Watch with Mother, Adventures of Superman, This Is Your Life, Ding Dong School, Omnibus, and Flower Pot Men; Canada begins its television broadcasts; Hockey Night in Canada and The Guiding Light move from radio to TV; CBC is launched.
- 1953: The first broadcast of Panorama, Make Room for Daddy, Romper Room, Kōhaku Uta Gassen; ABS-CBN launches in the Philippines; the coronation of Elizabeth II is the first ceremony of its kind to be broadcast on television. The Academy Awards ceremony (the Oscars) is televised for the first time after previously being broadcast by radio, beginning in 1930. NBC begins broadcasting the Macy's Thanksgiving Day Parade. TV Guide is founded. The first "TV dinner" is made by C.A. Swanson & Sons. The first color television introduced in the United States of America. The first television introduced in Belgium, Hungary, Japan, Mexico, Philippines, Switzerland, and Northern Ireland.
- 1954: First broadcast of The Tonight Show, Father Knows Best, Disneyland, Lassie and Hancock's Half Hour; NTSC video standard for color television is introduced, and National Educational Television (NET) is launched.
- 1955: First broadcast of Sam and Friends, The Phil Silvers Show, The Honeymooners, The Mickey Mouse Club, Picture Book, Alfred Hitchcock Presents, The Sooty Show, Sunday Night at the London Palladium, The Benny Hill Show, Gunsmoke, The Woodentops and Captain Kangaroo; ITV launches in the UK; millions of viewers watch the grand opening of Disneyland in California. The first television introduced in Thailand.
- 1956: First broadcast of The Edge of Night, As the World Turns, The Price Is Right, Playhouse 90 and the Eurovision Song Contest. The first television introduced in Algeria, Armenia, Australia, Azerbaijan, Belarus, Croatia, El Salvador, Finland, Georgia, Guam, Iraq, Nicaragua, Romania, South Korea, Spain, Sweden, Ukraine, Uruguay and Uzbekistan. ABC TV is launched.
- 1957: First broadcast of Perry Mason, Have Gun – Will Travel, The Ruff and Reddy Show, Leave It to Beaver, Maverick, Front Page Challenge, Senda prohibida, and Carosello; Steve Allen steps down as the host of The Tonight Show and I Love Lucy goes off the air.
- 1958: First broadcast of Blue Peter, The Donna Reed Show, 77 Sunset Strip, Moonlight Mask, Sea Hunt, Naked City, Adventure Time and The Huckleberry Hound Show; Canada completes its transcontinental television network; the quiz show scandals wipe out The $64,000 Question and Twenty-One. The first color television introduced in Cuba.
- 1959: First broadcast of The Twilight Zone, Telejornal, The Adventures of Rocky and Bullwinkle and Friends, The Untouchables, Rawhide, Okaasan to Issho and Bonanza; The second Grammy Awards ceremony is the first Grammy Awards to be televised and Nigeria is the first Sub-Saharan African country to receive TV.
- 1960: First broadcast of The Andy Griffith Show, The Shari Lewis Show, The Flintstones, Coronation Street, and The Bugs Bunny Show; American presidential candidates John F. Kennedy and Richard M. Nixon debate live on television.
- 1961: First broadcast of The Dick Van Dyke Show, The Avengers, The Defenders, Top Cat, The Alvin Show, The Yogi Bear Show, Mister Ed, The Morecambe and Wise Show and Car 54, Where Are You?; CTV network launches in Canada.
- 1962: First broadcast of The Beverly Hillbillies, The Virginian, McHale's Navy, Steptoe and Son, The Jetsons, The Saint, University Challenge, That Was The Week That Was, Animal Magic, Match Game, The Late Late Show (Ireland) and Sábado Gigante; Johnny Carson succeeds Jack Paar as host of The Tonight Show; first satellite television relayed by Telstar.
- 1963: First broadcast of Doctor Who, General Hospital, The Fugitive, Let's Make a Deal, Astro Boy and The Outer Limits, Hiwaga sa Bahay na Bato; American Cable Systems is founded; Martin Luther King Jr. addresses his famous I Have a Dream speech to the world; the world watches in horror over the Assassination of John F. Kennedy. The first color television introduced in Mexico.
- 1964: First broadcast of Gilligan's Island, The Munsters, Bewitched, Play School, Peyton Place, The Man from U.N.C.L.E, Hoppity Hooper, The Addams Family, Top of the Pops, Rudolph the Red-Nosed Reindeer, Match of the Day, Jeopardy!, Jonny Quest and the Up series; the controversial political advertisement "Daisy" airs only once, but is later considered to be an important factor in Lyndon B. Johnson's landslide victory over Barry Goldwater in the 1964 United States presidential election, and an important turning point in political and advertising history; Broadcast of U.S. president Lyndon Johnson signing the Civil Rights Act Of 1964; The Beatles appear on The Ed Sullivan Show.
- 1965: First broadcast of I Dream of Jeannie, Days of Our Lives, Here's Humphrey, Get Smart, Thunderbirds, The Dean Martin Show, Hogan's Heroes, Lost in Space, Till Death Us Do Part, The Dating Game, Peanuts animated specials, Des chiffres et des lettres, Tomorrow's World, The Magic Roundabout and The War Game; ABC, CBS, and NBC all transition their prime-time programs to color.
- 1966: First broadcast of Star Trek (original series), Batman (the live-action TV series), Hollywood Squares, The Monkees, Dark Shadows, Ultra Q, Family Affair, How the Grinch Stole Christmas!, That Girl, Cathy Come Home, The Newlywed Game, Mission: Impossible and W5; England wins the World Cup Final, seen by tens of millions; NBC becomes the first network to air their entire schedule in color. The first color television broadcasts introduced in Canada and the Philippines.
- 1967: First broadcast of The Carol Burnett Show, George of the Jungle, Bizzy Lizzy, Spider-Man, The Dating Game, The Prisoner, News at Ten and The Phil Donahue Show; first Super Bowl is broadcast by both CBS and NBC; PAL and SECAM colour standards introduced in Europe, with BBC2 making their first colour broadcasts. The first colour television introduced in France, Germany, Russia, Thailand, United Kingdom of Great Britain and Northern Ireland.
- 1968: First broadcast of 60 Minutes, One Life to Live, The Banana Splits, Dad's Army, Julia, Fabeltjeskrant, Columbo, Elvis, Mister Rogers' Neighborhood, Hawaii Five-O, Rowan & Martin's Laugh-In and Adam-12. The first color television introduced in Bermuda, Georgia, Iraq, Latvia, Lithuania and Switzerland.
- 1969: First broadcast of Sesame Street, Scooby-Doo, Where Are You!, Monty Python's Flying Circus, H.R. Pufnstuf and The Brady Bunch; completion of Fernsehturm Berlin; the Apollo 11 Moon landing is broadcast live worldwide. The first colour television introduced in American Samoa, Dominican Republic, Finland, Martinique and Taiwan.
- 1970: First broadcast of The Mary Tyler Moore Show, The Partridge Family, The Odd Couple, The Bugaloos, All My Children and Monday Night Football; PBS is launched. The first color television introduced in Guam, Guatemala and Sweden.
- 1971: First broadcast of All in the Family, Kamen Rider, The Old Grey Whistle Test, The Electric Company, Lidsville, The Two Ronnies, the first McDonaldland commercial, Upstairs, Downstairs, La Linea, "Hilltop (I'd Like to Buy the World a Coke)" (Coca-Cola), The Generation Game and Parkinson First World Series night game televised by NBC. The first colour television introduced in Belgium and Poland.
- 1972: First broadcast of M*A*S*H, New Zoo Revue, Emmerdale, Mastermind, Kamiondžije Zoom, The Bob Newhart Show, The Price Is Right, Rainbow, Sanford & Son, Fat Albert and the Cosby Kids, Great Performances and Maude; Canada starts domestic satellite broadcasts; HBO is launched; the first colour television introduced in Bosnia and Herzegovina, Brazil, Estonia, Guadeloupe, Norway, Panama, Réunion, Spain and Venezuela
- 1973: First broadcast of Boy on the Bike (Hovis), The Ascent of Man, Moonbase 3, The Young and the Restless, El Chavo del Ocho, An American Family, Sigmund and the Sea Monsters, Star Trek: The Animated Series, The Six Million Dollar Man, Ein Herz und eine Seele, Schoolhouse Rock!, El Chapulín Colorado, Kojak, Seventeen Moments of Spring, Tetley Tea Folk, Last of the Summer Wine and The World at War. The first color television introduced in China, Egypt, El Salvador, Gabon, Honduras, Monaco, New Zealand, Qatar and Saudi Arabia
- 1974: First broadcast of Happy Days, Little House on the Prairie, Chico and the Man, Derrick, Land of the Lost, Porridge, Rhoda, Good Times, The Rockford Files, and Tiswas; 1st Daytime Emmy Awards; Richard M. Nixon announces his resignation on live television; Global Television Network launches in Canada
- 1975: First broadcast of Starsky & Hutch, Barney Miller, Fawlty Towers, Good Morning America, One Day at a Time, Saturday Night Live, Far Out Space Nuts, Phyllis, Sneak Previews, Space: 1999, The Jeffersons, The Naked Civil Servant, Welcome Back Kotter, The Lost Saucer, Wonder Woman and Wheel of Fortune; Sony introduces the Betamax home video tape recorder.

== 1976–2025 ==
- 1976: First broadcast of The Muppet Show, Alice, The Bionic Woman, I, Claudius, Grlom u jagode, The Krofft Supershow, Quincy, M.E., Laverne & Shirley, SCTV, Austin City Limits, Charlie's Angels, What's Happening!!, Family Feud, The Gong Show and Nuts in May; the first VHSs and videocassette recorders (VCRs) go on sale.
- 1977: First broadcast of Abigail's Party, CHiPs, Eight Is Enough, The Love Boat, ¿Qué Pasa, USA?, Roots, Soap, It'll Be Alright on the Night, The Return of the Spirit, Fantasy Island, Hungarian Folktales, Three's Company, Top Gear and Live from the Met; Launch of Freeform and USA Network.
- 1978: First broadcast of 20/20, An Ordinary Miracle, Bassie & Adriaan, Abarembo Shogun, Battlestar Galactica, Dallas, Diff'rent Strokes, The Incredible Hulk, Ski Sunday, Grange Hill, Matador, Mork & Mindy, Pennies from Heaven, Taxi, Deeply Regretted By... and Card Sharks. Tic-Tac-Dough returns on CBS, then moves to syndication.
- 1979: First broadcast of Archie Bunker's Place, Benson, Blue Remembered Hills, Buck Rogers in the 25th Century, Hart to Hart, Knots Landing, Life on Earth, Antiques Roadshow, Eat Bulaga!, Doraemon, Real People, The Dukes of Hazzard, The Facts of Life, You Can't Do That on Television, The Meeting Place Cannot Be Changed, The Very Same Munchhausen and Tinker, Tailor, Soldier, Spy; ESPN and Nickelodeon are launched.
- 1980: First broadcast of Berlin Alexanderplatz, Bosom Buddies, Magnum PI, Too Close For Comfort, It's a Living, Nightline, BBC Children in Need, Vruć vetar, The Kids of Degrassi Street, Strumpet City and Yes Minister; Cable News Network (CNN) and The Learning Channel (TLC) are launched. The first color television introduced in Bangladesh, Burma, Gibraltar and South Korea. The television are launched in Saint Vincent and the Grenadines.
- 1981: First broadcast of The Smurfs, Hill Street Blues, The People's Court, The Greatest American Hero, Dynasty, Gimme a Break!, Postman Pat, Danger Mouse, Elvira's Movie Macabre, Falcon Crest, Only Fools and Horses and Brideshead Revisited; MTV is launched; hundreds of millions watch the Wedding of Charles, Prince of Wales and Lady Diana Spencer; a writers' strike disrupts U.S. television for three months.
- 1982: First broadcast of Cheers, Joanie Loves Chachi, Family Ties, Brookside, Remington Steele, The Snowman, Boys from the Blackstuff, Newhart, Knight Rider, Silver Spoons, and St. Elsewhere; Channel 4 (UK) and The Weather Channel are launched. The first color television introduced in Benin, Central African Republic, Chad, Rwanda, Sri Lanka and Tajikistan. The television are launched in Greenland, Macau and Mauritania.
- 1983: First broadcast of The A-Team, The Day After, V (original miniseries), 1984 (Apple Computers), He-Man and the Masters of the Universe, Fraggle Rock, Auf Wiedersehen, Pet, Reading Rainbow, Press Your Luck, Eddie Murphy Delirious, Inspector Gadget, The Joy of Painting, An Englishman Abroad, J. R. Hartley (Yellow Pages), Blackadder and Terrahawks; first broadcast of Wheel of Fortune in syndication; Disney Channel is launched. The first color television introduced in Angola, Bahamas, Burundi, Grenada and Romania. The television are launched in Antigua and Barbuda, Cambodia, Laos, Mali, Somalia, Seychelles, Tonga and Vatican City.
- 1984: First broadcast of Airwolf, Blue Thunder, Charles in Charge, Murder, She Wrote, Miami Vice, Punky Brewster, Who's the Boss?, The Cosby Show, The Transformers, Voltron, Night Court, Tales from the Darkside, Thomas & Friends, La piovra, Santa Barbara, Spitting Image, Heimat and The Jewel in the Crown; first broadcast of Jeopardy! in syndication; A&E and Canal+ launched. The first color television introduced in Belize, Greenland, Maldives, Mali, Mauritania, Mozambique, Namibia, Uzbekistan, and Zimbabwe. The television are launched in Nepal, Cabo Verde and Åland.
- 1985: First broadcast of MacGyver, 227, Growing Pains, ThunderCats, Neighbours, Moonlighting, Larry King Live, The Raccoons, Edge of Darkness, Little Muppet Monsters, The Max Headroom Show, EastEnders and The Golden Girls; the Discovery Channel is established; the first WrestleMania event is broadcast; millions watch the Live Aid concert from Wembley Stadium. The first color television introduced in Ghana and Seychelles.
- 1986: First broadcast of L.A. Law, The Oprah Winfrey Show, Perfect Strangers, Double Dare, Matlock, Fun TV with Kato-chan and Ken-chan, ALF, My Little Pony, The Real Ghostbusters, Casualty, London's Burning, Dragon Ball, Alternatywy 4, Pee-wee's Playhouse and The Singing Detective; the Fox Broadcasting Company is launched; television is introduced in Mayotte and Niue. The first color television is introduced in Cambodia.
- 1987: First broadcast of Full House, Married... with Children, Teenage Mutant Ninja Turtles, Thirtysomething, Ramayan, Fireman Sam, DuckTales, Inspector Morse, The Bold and the Beautiful, Star Trek: The Next Generation, Square One TV, The Tracey Ullman Show and 21 Jump Street; The first WWF Survivor Series PPV is held.
- 1988: First broadcast of Roseanne, Mystery Science Theater 3000, Red Dwarf, A Pup Named Scooby-Doo, In the Heat of the Night, Just Do It (Nike), Murphy Brown, Yo! MTV Raps, Kiteretsu Daihyakka, Garfield and Friends, Unsolved Mysteries, America's Most Wanted, The Wonder Years, Soreike! Anpanman and Mahabharat; TNT (Turner Network Television), YTV and the Nick Jr. programming block are launched; the first LCD televisions go on sale; a writers' strike disrupts U.S. television for five months; television in introduced in Lesotho. The first color television in Lesotho and Papua New Guinea.
- 1989: First broadcast of The Simpsons, Seinfeld, Baywatch, Saved by the Bell, Family Matters, American Gladiators, Wallace & Gromit, Byker Grove, Hey Dude, Face (British Airways), America's Funniest Home Videos, Dragon Ball Z, Quantum Leap, COPS, Rap City, Chip 'n Dale: Rescue Rangers, Agatha Christie's Poirot, Shining Time Station, Coach and Inside Edition; the trial and execution of Nicolae and Elena Ceaușescu is televised.
- 1990: First broadcast of Law & Order, Twin Peaks, The Fresh Prince of Bel-Air, Captain Planet and the Planeteers, Beverly Hills, 90210, Mr. Bean, Tiny Toon Adventures, Parker Lewis Can't Lose, In Living Color, Johnson and Friends, Northern Exposure, and Pingu; Fox Kids is launched; The Gulf War and 1990 FIFA World Cup are among the year's most televised events.
- 1991: First broadcast of Home Improvement, Step by Step, Nummer 28, Darkwing Duck, Rupert, Where's Wally?, The Julekalender, Æon Flux, the first three Nicktoons (Doug, Rugrats, and The Ren & Stimpy Show), The Jenny Jones Show, Maury, and The Jerry Springer Show; Launch of Court TV, ABC Kids as a programming block and Comedy Central.
- 1992: First broadcast of The Larry Sanders Show, Mad About You, Are You Afraid of the Dark?, Batman: The Animated Series (first series in the DC Animated Universe), Barney & Friends, Martin, The Real World, Sailor Moon, Bananas in Pyjamas, Hangin' with Mr. Cooper, My Little Pony Tales, Cha Cha Cha, Lamb Chop's Play-Along, Crayon Shin-chan, YuYu Hakusho, Melrose Place, X-Men: The Animated Series and Absolutely Fabulous, Mara Clara; Cartoon Network is launched. The first color television introduced in Fiji, Nauru and Tuvalu. The television are launched in Solomon Islands, São Tomé and Príncipe, South Ossetia and Transnistria.
- 1993: First broadcast of Late Show with David Letterman, Animaniacs, The X-Files, NYPD Blue, Beavis and Butt-Head, Mighty Morphin Power Rangers, Lois & Clark: The New Adventures of Superman, "Aaron Burr" (first Got Milk? commercial), WWF Monday Night Raw, Walker, Texas Ranger, Family Dog, Homicide: Life on the Street, The Big Comfy Couch, Boy Meets World, Dr. Quinn, Medicine Woman, Bill Nye the Science Guy, seaQuest DSV, The Nanny, Ricki Lake, Frasier, Star Trek: Deep Space Nine, and Rocko's Modern Life; Major League Soccer (MLS) and Ultimate Fighting Championship (UFC) are founded; the Super Bowl XXVII halftime show becomes one of the most-watched performances in American television history; the PTV brand is launched.
- 1994: First broadcast of Friends, Party of Five, Ellen, The Kingdom, Babylon 5, The National Lottery Draws, Inside the Actors Studio, Space Ghost Coast to Coast, Spider-Man, The Tick, All That, Heartbreak High, Aaahh!!! Real Monsters, ER, Gargoyles, All That, Allegra's Window, and Gullah Gullah Island; Turner Classic Movies is launched; Several TV stations in the US switch their affiliates until 1996; Irish dance company Riverdance is introduced to the world for the first time at the 1994 Eurovision Song Contest to a thunderous ovation.
- 1995: First broadcast of Father Ted, NileCity 105,6, The Wayans Bros., Pinky and the Brain, Freakazoid!, Xena: Warrior Princess, The Sylvester & Tweety Mysteries, The Late Late Show, WCW Monday Nitro, Road Rules, The Drew Carey Show, Budweiser Frogs, Star Trek: Voyager, Neon Genesis Evangelion, NewsRadio, Saksi, Caroline in the City, JAG, Él y ella and Sevcec; The programme Rox makes a move to the Internet, becoming the first-ever web series; The History Channel is launched; The communications satellite EchoStar I is (literally) launched; ad campaign; The O. J. Simpson murder trial is televised.
- 1996: First broadcast of 3rd Rock from the Sun, 7th Heaven, Spin City, The Crocodile Hunter, Inai Inai Baa!, Hey Arnold!, Blue's Clues, The Daily Show, E! True Hollywood Story, Judge Judy, Arthur, Muppets Tonight, Dexter's Laboratory, Kenan & Kel, Superman: The Animated Series, Our Friends in the North, Jumanji, The Steve Harvey Show and Everybody Loves Raymond; Fox News is launched; the first high-definition television broadcasts; the first DVDs and DVD players go on sale; Animal Planet is launched
- 1997: First broadcast of South Park, Pokémon, Stargate SG-1, Recess, Buffy the Vampire Slayer, Teletubbies, Alles Kan Beter, Extreme Ghostbusters, Bear in the Big Blue House, King of the Hill, Johnny Bravo, The Angry Beavers, Dharma & Greg, Emeril Live, Daria, and I'm Alan Partridge; the TV Parental Guidelines television content rating system is introduced; Netflix is founded, starting life as a mail-based rental service; the Disney Channel preschool programming block called Disney Channel Little Kids & Treehouse TV are launched; the first plasma televisions go on sale; 685 children across Japan are taken to hospitals from seizures caused by a Pokémon episode; millions watch the funeral of Princess Diana.
- 1998: First broadcast of Who Wants to Be a Millionaire?, Dawson's Creek, Will & Grace, Charmed, Godzilla: The Series, Celebrity Deathmatch, Kids Say the Darndest Things, The Wild Thornberrys, Total Request, Total Request Live, The Powerpuff Girls, Cowboy Bebop, That '70s Show, Sex and the City, WCW Thunder, The Royle Family, The King of Queens, and CatDog; Toon Disney is launched; Kingston Communications launches the first major video-on-demand service.
- 1999: First broadcast of Law & Order: Special Victims Unit, The Sopranos, Family Guy, SpongeBob SquarePants, Futurama, Ed, Edd n Eddy, Courage the Cowardly Dog, Dragon Tales, Rocket Power, The West Wing, Whassup? (Budweiser), Tweenies, WWF Smackdown, One Piece, Global Anthem (Ford), Bob the Builder, House Hunters, Zoom, The Amanda Show, Big Brother (Netherlands), Walking with Prehistoric Life, Yo soy Betty, la fea, Surfer (Guinness), Freaks and Geeks, Trick, Rove, and Angel; the first digital video recorders (DVRs) go on sale, one of them being TiVo; Bhutan becomes the last country to introduce television by the celebration of the fourth king's Silver Jubilee after years of self-imposed prohibition of media technology; PBS Kids, which replaced PTV, is launched & Disney Channel Little Kids is rebranded as Playhouse Disney.
- 2000: First broadcast of CSI: Crime Scene Investigation, Big Brother (U.S.), Curb Your Enthusiasm, Malcolm in the Middle, MTV Cribs, Survivor, Static Shock, Power Rangers Lightspeed Rescue, Jackass, 106 & Park, Weakest Link, Just for Laughs: Gags, The Weekenders, Dora the Explorer, Clifford the Big Red Dog, Aqua Teen Hunger Force and Gilmore Girls; Billy Mays shoots an infomercial for OxiClean
- 2001: First broadcast of The Bernie Mac Show, 24, Scrubs, Smallville, Star Trek: Enterprise, Power Rangers Time Force, Digimon Tamers, The Office (UK), Band of Brothers, Sangdo, Merchants of Joseon, My Wife and Kids, Alias, The Amazing Race, The Secret Life of Us, Fear Factor, Trailer Park Boys, The Fairly OddParents, Invader Zim, The Grim Adventures of Billy & Mandy, The Proud Family, Justice League, Samurai Jack, Yu-Gi-Oh!, Lizzie McGuire, Totally Spies!, How It's Made, and Six Feet Under, and Law & Order: Criminal Intent. The world witnesses the September 11 terrorist attacks in New York City and Washington which sees regular programming suspended to bring up-to-date coverage of events relating to the attacks. ABC Kids is launched as a stand-alone channel.
- 2002: First broadcast of American Idol, The Bachelor, The Shield, City of Men, Kim Possible, Extreme Makeover, What's New, Scooby-Doo?, I'm a Celebrity... Get Me Out of Here!, Cyberchase, Baby Looney Tunes, 8 Simple Rules, Monk, The Adventures of Jimmy Neutron: Boy Genius, Codename: Kids Next Door, Madventures, Firefly, 100 Greatest Britons, The Most Extreme, Winter Sonata, Ghost in the Shell: Stand Alone Complex, Clone High, George Lopez, The Wire, Naruto, Wish Ko Lang!, and Without a Trace, Top Gear; The WWF ends its "Attitude Era" and is forced to change its name to WWE due to a dispute with the World Wide Fund for Nature; Millions watch the Winter Olympic Games in Salt Lake City and the 2002 FIFA World Cup hosted by Japan and South Korea; CBeebies, Nicktoons, NickMusic and CBBC are launched.
- 2003: First broadcast of Two and a Half Men, That's So Raven, Chappelle's Show, One Tree Hill, Teen Titans, The O.C., My Life as a Teenage Robot, Xiaolin Showdown, Strawberry Shortcake, Cog (Honda), Sonic X, Reno 911!, The Bachelorette, The Simple Life, MythBusters, Something Special, NCIS, Jimmy Kimmel Live!, Punk'd, All In, Little Britain, Peep Show, Arrested Development, Los Serrano, Martin Mystery, The Ellen DeGeneres Show and The Venture Bros.; The controversial Iraq War becomes the year's most covered story on news channels around the world.
- 2004: First broadcast of Bleach, Entourage, Laguna Beach: The Real Orange County, House, Lost, Desperate Housewives, Veronica Mars, Danny Phantom, Battlestar Galactica (2004), Drawn Together, Justice League Unlimited, Ned's Declassified School Survival Guide, Unfabulous, Pimp My Ride, Rescue Me, Ghost Hunters, Foster's Home for Imaginary Friends, Hassan and Habibah, Peppa Pig, Drake & Josh, LazyTown, the GEICO Cavemen, W.I.T.C.H., Super Girl, The Backyardigans, Winx Club, Hell's Kitchen (UK), The Apprentice (U.S.), The Biggest Loser, and The X Factor; Euro1080 launches the first high-definition television broadcast.
- 2005: First broadcast of Avatar: The Last Airbender, It's Always Sunny in Philadelphia, Grey's Anatomy, Spiral, Noghtechin, Dancing with the Stars, The Closer, Rome, Zoey 101, Bratz, The Suite Life of Zack & Cody, My Name Is Earl, Weeds, Ben 10, Camp Lazlo, My Gym Partner's a Monkey, So You Think You Can Dance, Little Einsteins, Bones, The Colbert Report, American Dad!, Everybody Hates Chris, The Office (U.S.), How I Met Your Mother, The Girls Next Door, Criminal Minds, Deal or No Deal, Carlton Draught: Big Ad, Balitanghali, Supernatural and Prison Break; The Trials of Michael Jackson and Saddam Hussein, the Funeral of Pope John Paul II, and the Wedding of Prince Charles and Camilla each get significant news coverage.
- 2006: First broadcast of High School Musical, The Hills, Türkisch für Anfänger, Planet Earth, Jumong, Heroes, Dexter, Psych, Class of 3000, Friday Night Lights, Kappa Mikey, Ugly Betty, Hannah Montana, Death Note, Top Chef, The Real Housewives of Orange County, Charlie Brooker's Screenwipe, Code Geass, Fetch! with Ruff Ruffman, Mickey Mouse Clubhouse, Curious George, and 30 Rock; the Netherlands is the first country to move to digital television; HD DVD and Blu-ray Disc launched; Luxembourg becomes the first country to complete a wholesale switch from analog television to digital over-the-air (terrestrial television) broadcasting.
- 2007: First broadcast of The Big Bang Theory, Kitchen Nightmares, Keeping Up with the Kardashians, Britain's Got Talent, Gorilla (Cadbury's Dairy Milk), Burn Notice, iCarly, Back at the Barnyard, The Golden Path, Yo Gabba Gabba!, Pushing Daisies, the John Lewis Christmas advert, Wizards of Waverly Place, Phineas and Ferb, Total Drama, Xavier: Renegade Angel, Gossip Girl, WordGirl, Super Why, iCarly, El Tigre: The Adventures of Manny Rivera, Are You Smarter than a 5th Grader?, Golden Bride, The Killing, Chuck, Mad Men and Damages; 2007 Venezuelan RCTV protests in Venezuela; a writers' strike shuts down U.S. scripted programming in November; CNN and YouTube sponsor U.S. presidential debates.
- 2008: First broadcast of Breaking Bad, The Mentalist, Sons of Anarchy, Star Wars: The Clone Wars, The Suite Life on Deck, Paris Hilton's My New BFF, Wipeout, True Blood, Fringe, Underbelly, The Inbetweeners, Radio Arvyla, 19 Kids and Counting; the launch of Discovery Channel's ad campaign; the first 3D TV broadcasts; Thai PBS are launched; the historical miniseries John Adams premieres on HBO and wins a record-breaking thirteen Emmys.
- 2009: First broadcast of Pointless, Modern Family, Pawn Stars, Cake Boss, Tosh.0, Jersey Shore, The Electric Company, Castle, Horrible Histories, White Collar, The Vampire Diaries, The Good Wife, The Cleveland Show, Gigglebiz Cougar Town, RuPaul's Drag Race, Archer, 16 and Pregnant, Late Night With Jimmy Fallon, The Middle, Glee, Teen Mom, Parks and Recreation, Community and Misfits; Toon Disney is rebranded as Disney XD; the Nick Jr. Channel & TeenNick are launched; millions watch the inauguration of Barack Obama as well as coverage of the death and funeral of Michael Jackson.
- 2010: First broadcast of My Little Pony: Friendship Is Magic, Adventure Time, Louie, Regular Show, Hawaii Five-0, Blue Bloods, Downton Abbey, Good Luck Charlie, Glass Home, Borgen, Sherlock, Victorious, Mike & Molly, Team Umizoomi, Solsidan, "The Man Your Man Could Smell Like" (Old Spice), Pretty Little Liars, Scooby Doo! Mystery Incorporated, Generator Rex, T.U.F.F. Puppy, Shake It Up, Boardwalk Empire, Justified, The Great British Bake Off, Treme, Young Justice, The Walking Dead and The Voice (Holland); Tonight Show conflict between Jay Leno and Conan O'Brien.
- 2011: First broadcast of Game of Thrones, Black Mirror, Top Boy, Jake and the Neverland Pirates, Person of Interest, Bob's Burgers, Leyla ile Mecnun, American Horror Story, Suits, Shameless, Austin & Ally, The Amazing World of Gumball, The Looney Tunes Show, Power Rangers Samurai, Kung Fu Panda: Legends of Awesomeness, New Girl, Jessie, Wild Kratts and Homeland; State Farm premieres its "State of..." advertising campaign, which includes the "State of Unrest" commercial (a.k.a. "Jake from State Farm"); millions watch Prince William marry Kate Middleton; IBM's Watson competes against former champions Brad Rutter and Ken Jennings on Jeopardy!; President Obama announces the death of Osama bin Laden on live television; Playhouse Disney is rebranded as Disney Junior, ABC Kids is launched as a part-time channel.
- 2012: First broadcast of Gravity Falls, Littlest Pet Shop, Daniel Tiger's Neighborhood, Duck Dynasty, Satyamev Jayate, Teenage Mutant Ninja Turtles, Girls, Key & Peele, Scandal, Nashville, Državni posao, Call the Midwife, Oliver Stone's Untold History of the United States, House of Lies, Veep, Arrow, Omar, JoJo's Bizarre Adventure, Doc McStuffins and Kitchen; the 2012 London Olympics becomes the most-watched event of the year.
- 2013: First broadcast of Steven Universe, Rick and Morty, Peaky Blinders, The Following, Epic Split (Volvo Trucks), House of Cards, Sofia the First, The Americans, Bates Motel, Broadchurch, Hannibal, Attack on Titan, Paw Patrol, Vikings, Orange Is the New Black and Brooklyn Nine-Nine; Television stations cover the Resignation of Pope Benedict XVI and the election of his successor while in the United States, American singer Miley Cyrus creates controversy during a performance at that year's VMAs.
- 2014: First broadcast of True Detective, How to Get Away with Murder, Black-ish, Gotham, Last Week Tonight with John Oliver, Fargo, BoJack Horseman, You're the Worst, The Flash, Gomorrah, Outlander, Lucha Underground, Blaze and the Monster Machines, Broad City, Over the Garden Wall, The Leftovers, Jane the Virgin, Chrisley Knows Best, Girl Meets World, Odd Squad and LoliRock; Billions of people watch the 2014 FIFA World Cup.
- 2015: First broadcast of Better Call Saul, Empire, Narcos, Crazy Ex-Girlfriend, Life in Pieces, Master of None, Daredevil, Jessica Jones, The Man in the High Castle, Miraculous: Tales of Ladybug & Cat Noir, K.C. Undercover, Unbreakable Kimmy Schmidt, Supergirl, Love Island, Harvey Beaks, Mr. Robot, Schitt's Creek, Deutschland 83, Lip Sync Battle, Superstore and We Bare Bears; Super Bowl XLIX breaks the record for most-watched program in the history of American television; Mayweather–Pacquiao boxing match is history's biggest pay-per-view fight; Steve Harvey hosts the Miss Universe 2015 pageant in Las Vegas and mistakenly names the first runner-up, Miss Colombia (Ariadna Gutiérrez) as the winner, announcing shortly after that he had read the results incorrectly and that Miss Philippines (Pia Wurtzbach) was the new Miss Universe; ten are killed during a helicopter crash during filming of reality series Dropped.
- 2016: First broadcast of Stranger Things, The Night Of, Lucifer, Fleabag, War & Peace, Roots, Mann Mayal, Atlanta, This Is Us, The Good Place, My Hero Academia, Full Frontal with Samantha Bee, Insecure, Westworld, The Loud House, Tales of Arcadia and The Crown; the last known company in the world to manufacture VHS equipment (VCR/DVD combos), Funai of Japan, ceases production, citing shrinking demand and difficulties procuring parts.
- 2017: First broadcast of Money Heist, Riverdale, Young Sheldon, Big Little Lies, DuckTales (2017), Raven's Home, Andi Mack, The Marvelous Mrs. Maisel, Big Mouth, Carpool Karaoke, The Punisher, The Handmaid's Tale, The Repair Shop, GLOW, S.W.A.T., and A Series of Unfortunate Events; At the 89th Academy Awards, the film Moonlight is announced the correct winner for Best Picture, after actors Faye Dunaway and Warren Beatty announce La La Land, another acclaimed film, the winner by mistake on national television.
- 2018: First broadcast of Bluey, Cobra Kai, Hilda, She-Ra and the Princesses of Power, Tom Clancy's Jack Ryan, Barry, Killing Eve, Bodyguard, Big City Greens, Pose, Succession, The Neighborhood, and Patriot Act with Hasan Minhaj; millions watch Prince Harry marry Meghan Markle.
- 2019: First broadcast of Chernobyl, The Mandalorian, The Boys, Infinity Train, Amphibia, Watchmen, Molly of Denali, The Masked Singer, All Elite Wrestling: Dynamite, Russian Doll, Demon Slayer: Kimetsu no Yaiba, His Dark Materials, The Umbrella Academy, The Other Two, Hanna, Euphoria, Ramy, What We Do in the Shadows, Sex Education, When They See Us, Good Omens, Virgin River and The Morning Show; Apple Inc. and The Walt Disney Company launched their streaming services, Apple TV and Disney+.
- 2020: First broadcast of Ted Lasso, Little Fires Everywhere, Tiger King, Bridgerton, I May Destroy You, A Teacher, Stargirl, Mrs. America, My Little Pony: Pony Life, Outer Banks, Dispatches from Elsewhere, The Owl House, The Great, Solar Opposites, Dave, Dash & Lily, and Love, Victor; the COVID-19 pandemic shuts down production on many television programs.
- 2021: First broadcast of Squid Game, Invincible, The Great North, Yellowjackets, Girls5eva, Hacks, Reservation Dogs, Ginny & Georgia, Spidey and His Amazing Friends, Only Murders in the Building, Schmigadoon!, Gabby's Dollhouse, The White Lotus, Abbott Elementary, Arcane, the Marvel Cinematic Universe Disney+ shows and specials, It's a Sin and The Traitors (Dutch); Nickelodeon's SpongeBob SquarePants debuts spin-offs: The Patrick Star Show, and Kamp Koral: SpongeBob's Under Years, The globally watched Tokyo Summer Olympics are held a year later due to the COVID-19 pandemic.
- 2022: First broadcast of Severance, Tulsa King, Peacemaker, Wednesday, Interview with the Vampire, My Little Pony: Make Your Mark, Smiling Friends, Don't Hug Me I'm Scared, Batwheels, The Bear, The Summer I Turned Pretty, Tokyo Vice and Becoming a Popstar; millions watch in shock as actor Will Smith slaps comedian Chris Rock live during the 94th Academy Awards; billions watch the Russian invasion of Ukraine, speculated to be the most watched television war in history and state funeral of Elizabeth II, speculated to be the most watched television event in history.
- 2023: First broadcast of The Last of Us, Beef, Poker Face, XO, Kitty, Marvel's Moon Girl and Devil Dinosaur, School Spirits, Kiff, Based on a True Story, Mrs. Davis, Krapopolis and Percy Jackson and the Olympians; in Hollywood, the Writers Guild of America and SAG-AFTRA begin a series of ongoing strikes of actors and writers for six months separately, affecting the film and television industries; billions watch the Coronation of Charles III and Camilla and Gaza war.
- 2024: First broadcast of Shōgun, Hazbin Hotel, Mr Bates vs The Post Office, Barney's World, Mr. & Mrs. Smith, Grimsburg, Nobody Wants This, Baby Reindeer, The Penguin, Doctor Odyssey and Quiet on Set: The Dark Side of Kids TV; Several national elections are held around the world including some of the world's most populated countries along with television coverage.
- 2025: First broadcast of Pluribus, StuGo, The Pitt, Shifting Gears, Étoile, Long Story Short, Sherlock & Daughter, Dexter: Resurrection, Eyes of Wakanda, Too Much, We Were Liars, Your Friendly Neighborhood Spider-Man, Pulse, Alien: Earth, Heated Rivalry and It: Welcome to Derry

== 2026–present ==
- 2026: First broadcast of A Knight of the Seven Kingdoms, Lanterns, Elle, Spider-Noir, Star Trek: Starfleet Academy, The Boroughs, Wonder Man, VisionQuest and Half Man

== See also ==
- Table of years in radio
- Timeline of the BBC
- Timeline of the introduction of television in countries
- List of web television series
- List of years in American television
- List of years in Australian television
- List of years in Austrian television
- List of years in Belgian television
- List of years in Brazilian television
- List of years in British television
- List of years in Canadian television
- List of years in Croatian television
- List of years in Czech television
- List of years in Danish television
- List of years in Dutch television
- List of years in Estonian television
- List of years in French television
- List of years in German television
- List of years in Greek television
- List of years in Hong Kong television
- List of years in Indian television
- List of years in Indonesian television
- List of years in Irish television
- List of years in Israeli television
- List of years in Italian television
- List of years in Japanese television
- List of years in Mexican television
- List of years in New Zealand television
- List of years in Norwegian television
- List of years in Pakistani television
- List of years in Philippine television
- List of years in Polish television
- List of years in Portuguese television
- List of years in Scottish television
- List of years in Singapore television
- List of years in South African television
- List of years in South Korean television
- List of years in Spanish television
- List of years in Swedish television
- List of years in Swiss television
- List of years in Thai television
- List of years in Turkish television
