= Before 1925 in television =

This is a list of television-related events that occurred prior to 1925.

== Global television events ==
Year	Event
1873	Willoughby Smith discovers the photoconductivity of the element selenium. This results in the invention of the photoelectric cell.
1877	George R. Carey of Boston creates a selenium telectroscope—a camera that could project a moving image to a distant point. The telectroscope is the first television prototype.
1880	Proposals to transmit images by rapidly scanning them in succession are made independently by William E. Sawyer of the United States and Maurice Leblanc of France.
1884	Paul Nipkow invents the Nipkow disk, a means of scanning an image mechanically. This method is later used for mechanical television experiments.
1890	Henry Sutton Telephane 1885 (mechanical television) designs published.
1895	Noah S. Amstutz demonstrates the transmission of photographic halftone images by electric telegraphy.
1897	Karl Ferdinand Braun invents the cathode-ray tube, using it as an oscilloscope.
1900	The word "television" is coined by Constantin Perskyi on August 18 at the First International Electricity Congress in Paris.
1907	Boris Rosing transmits silhouette images of geometric shapes, using a Nipkow disc, mirror-drum and a cathode-ray tube receiver.
1908	In his letter to Nature, Alan Campbell-Swinton describes the modern electronic camera and display system which others are to develop throughout the 1920s.
1921	Charles Francis Jenkins with a group of friends incorporates Jenkins Laboratories in Washington, D.C., with the purpose of "developing radio movies to be broadcast for entertainment in the home".
1922	Charles Jenkins' first public demonstration of television principles. A set of static photographic pictures is transmitted from Washington, D.C., to the Navy station NOF in Anacostia by telephone wire, and then wirelessly back to Washington.
1922	Philo Farnsworth first describes an image dissector tube, which uses caesium to produce images electronically, but will not produce a working model until 1927.
1923	Charles Jenkins first demonstrates "true" television with moving images. This time 48-line moving silhouette images are transmitted at 16 frames per second from Washington to Anacostia Navy station.
1923	Vladimir Zworykin applies for patent for an all-electronic television system, the first ancestor of the electric scanning television camera. The patent is not granted until 1938 after significant revisions and patent interference actions.
1924	John Logie Baird demonstrates a semi-mechanical television system with the transmission of moving silhouette images in England.
1924	Vladimir Zworykin files a patent application for the kinescope, a television picture receiver tube.

== Births ==
=== Births (before 1900) ===
Date	Name	Notability
September 4, 1855	Henry Sutton	Australian designer of mechanical scanning television (died 1912)
August 22, 1867	Charles Francis Jenkins	American inventor and promoter of mechanical scanning television (died 1934)
April 23, 1869	Boris Rosing	Russian pioneer of television technology (died 1933)
November 22, 1874	Elizabeth Patterson	American actress (I Love Lucy) (died 1966)
July 21, 1882	Dr. Herbert Ives	American television researcher, leader of the AT&T television research during the 1920s–1930s (died 1953)
February 8, 1884	Burt Mustin	American actor (All in the Family) (died 1977)
November 9, 1886	Ed Wynn	American actor and comedian (The Ed Wynn Show) (died 1966)
January 16, 1887	John Hamilton	American actor (Adventures of Superman) (died 1958)
February 26, 1887	William Frawley	American actor (I Love Lucy, My Three Sons) (died 1966)
August 14, 1888	John Logie Baird	British pioneer of television technology (d. 1946)
January 7, 1889	H. R. Baukhage	American journalist and broadcaster (d. 1976)
July 20, 1889	John Reith, 1st Baron Reith	First Director-General of the BBC (d. 1971)
July 30, 1889	Vladimir Zworykin	American pioneer of television technology (died 1982)
August 28, 1891	Stanley Andrews	American actor (Death Valley Days) (died 1969)
January 26, 1892	Zara Cully	American actress (The Jeffersons) (died 1978)
February 14, 1894	Jack Benny	American actor (The Jack Benny Program) (died 1974)
March 6, 1894	Clifford Roberts	American dealer (died 1977)
August 21, 1895	Blossom Rock	American actress (The Addams Family) (died 1978)
January 7, 1896	Arnold Ridley	British actor and playwright (Dad's Army) (died 1984)
November 4, 1896	Ian Wolfe	Actor (died 1992)
May 25, 1898	Bennett Cerf	American publisher and game show panelist (What's My Line?) (died 1971)
August 30, 1898	Shirley Booth	American actress (Hazel) (died 1992)
September 1, 1898	Violet Carson	British actress and radio performer (Coronation Street) (died 1983)

=== Births (1900–1909) ===
Date	Name	Notability
October 4, 1900	Robert Shayne	American actor (Adventures of Superman) (died 1992)
November 13, 1900	Worthington Miner	American actor (died 1982)
December 6, 1900	Agnes Moorehead	American actress (Bewitched) (died 1974)
March 27, 1901	Carl Barks	American animator (creator of Scrooge McDuck) (died 2000)
July 1, 1901	Irna Phillips	American writer (creator of early soap opera) (died 1973)
July 14, 1901	George Tobias	American actor (Bewitched) (died 1980)
September 28, 1901	Ed Sullivan	American television host (The Ed Sullivan Show) (died 1974)
September 28, 1901	William S. Paley	American businessman (died 1990)
December 5, 1901	Walt Disney	American animator (died 1966)
March 17, 1902	Bobby Jones	American golfer (died 1971)
April 27, 1902	Harry Stockwell	American actor (died 1984)
October 10, 1902	Charles Lloyd-Pack	English actor (died 1983)
October 17, 1902	Irene Ryan	American actress (The Beverly Hillbillies) (died 1973)
December 14, 1902	Frances Bavier	American actress (Aunt Bee on The Andy Griffith Show) (died 1989)
December 25, 1902	Barton MacLane	American actor (I Dream of Jeannie) (died 1969)
May 29, 1903	Bob Hope	British-American movie, television, radio and vaudeville actor, writer and producer (Bob Hope Presents the Chrysler Theatre) (died 2003)
September 17, 1903	Dolores Costello	American actress (died 1979)
March 1, 1904	Paul Hartman	American dancer and actor (The Andy Griffith Show, Mayberry R.F.D.) (died 1973)
June 17, 1904	Ralph Bellamy	American stage, movie and television actor (Man Against Crime) (died 1991)
July 5, 1904	Don Goddard	Radio and television announcer (died 1994)
January 26, 1905	Charles Lane	American actor (Petticoat Junction) (died 2007)
January 27, 1905	Howard McNear	American actor (Floyd Lawson on The Andy Griffith Show) (died 1969)
May 16, 1905	Henry Fonda	American actor (died 1982)
September 18, 1905	Eddie Anderson	American actor (The Jack Benny Program) (died 1977)
October 4, 1905	Leslie Mitchell	British announcer (died 1985)
February 6, 1906	John Carradine	American actor (died 1988)
February 20, 1906	Gale Gordon	American actor (The Lucy Show) (died 1995)
March 29, 1906	Anthony W. Marshall	American television producer (died 1999)
April 4, 1906	Bea Benaderet	American actress (The Flintstones) (died 1968)
April 4, 1906	John Cameron Swayze	American anchorman (Camel News Caravan) (died 1995)
April 22, 1906	Eddie Albert	American actor (Green Acres, Switch) (died 2005)
August 19, 1906	Philo Farnsworth	American inventor credited with the invention of the cathode-ray tube television (died 1971)
December 25, 1906	Lew Grade	Ukrainian-born British media proprietor and impresario (died 1998)
January 6, 1907	Helen Kleeb	American actress (The Waltons) (died 2003)
February 12, 1907	Joseph Kearns	American actor (Dennis the Menace) (died 1962)
February 26, 1907	Dub Taylor	American actor (died 1994)
March 16, 1907	Frances Fuller	American actress (died 1980)
May 22, 1907	Cecil McGivern	British broadcasting executive; controller of BBC Television from 1950 to 1957 (died 1963)
August 7, 1907	Joe Besser	American actor (died 1988)
August 20, 1907	Alan Reed	American actor (voice of Fred Flintstone on The Flintstones) (died 1977)
September 29, 1907	Gene Autry	American music performer (The Gene Autry Show), and founder of the Los Angeles Angels MLB franchise (died 1998)
October 20, 1907	Arlene Francis	American actress and game show panelist (What's My Line?) (died 2001)
January 8, 1908	William Hartnell	British actor; the original Doctor Who in the 1960s (died 1975)
January 30, 1908	Richard Hearne	British comic performer ("Mr Pastry") (died 1979)
February 13, 1908	Pauline Frederick	American journalist (died 1990)
February 14, 1908	Lennie Hayton	American composer (died 1971)
February 28, 1908	Billie Bird	American radio, film, television and vaudeville actress (Dear John) (died 2002)
April 2, 1908	Buddy Ebsen	American actor (The Beverly Hillbillies) (died 2003)
April 30, 1908	Eve Arden	American actress (Our Miss Brooks) (died 1990)
May 10, 1908	Neva Carr Glyn	Actress (died 1975)
June 18, 1908	Bud Collyer	American radio actor and announcer and game show host (died 1969)
July 12, 1908	Milton Berle	American actor (Texaco Star Theater) (died 2002)
July 31, 1908	Bill Shadel	American news anchor (died 2005)
August 27, 1908	Lyndon B. Johnson	American president (died 1973)
October 6, 1908	Carole Lombard	American actress (died 1942)
December 14, 1908	Morey Amsterdam	American actor (The Dick Van Dyke Show) (died 1996)
December 21, 1908	Pat Weaver	American broadcasting executive (died 2002)
February 2, 1909	Frank Albertson	American actor (died 1964)
February 16, 1909	Hugh Beaumont	American actor (Leave it to Beaver) (died 1982)
March 18, 1909	Henry Longhurst	Golf writer (died 1978)
May 1, 1909	Elmer Balaban	American theater owner and early cable television provider (died 2001)
May 13, 1909	Mae Laborde	American actress (died 2012)
July 26, 1909	Vivian Vance	American actress (I Love Lucy) (died 1979)
November 11, 1909	Paul Shannon	Pittsburgh radio and television announcer (died 1990)

=== Births (1910–1919) ===
Date	Name	Notability
January 23, 1910	Django Reinhardt	Composer (died 1953)
May 15, 1910	Michael Barry	British television producer and executive; Head of Drama at BBC television from 1952 to 1962 (died 1988)
May 22, 1910	Johnny Olson	American radio and television announcer (The New Price Is Right) (died 1985)
May 28, 1910	Thora Hird	English comic actress (Last of the Summer Wine, Talking Heads) (died 2003)
June 10, 1910	Red Foley	American singer (died 1968)
June 13, 1910	Mary Wickes	American actress (Father Dowling Mysteries) (died 1995)
August 22, 1910	Lesley Woods	American actress (died 2003)
October 23, 1910	Hayden Rorke	American actor (I Dream of Jeannie) (died 1987)
February 6, 1911	Ronald Reagan	American actor and president (General Electric Theater) (died 2004)
February 13, 1911	Jean Muir	American actress (died 1996)
March 5, 1911	Joseph Tomelty	Irish actor (died 1995)
March 13, 1911	Marie Rudisill	American television personality (The Fruitcake Lady from The Tonight Show with Jay Leno) (died 2006)
May 6, 1911	Frank Nelson	American actor (died 1986)
July 7, 1911	Gretchen Franklin	British actress (EastEnders) (died 2005)
August 6, 1911	Lucille Ball	American comic actress (I Love Lucy) (died 1989)
October 23, 1911	Martha Rountree	American broadcast journalist (Meet the Press) (died 1999)
November 5, 1911	Roy Rogers	American singer and actor (The Roy Rogers Show) (died 1998)
December 10, 1911	Chet Huntley	American anchorman (The Huntley-Brinkley Report) (died 1974)
January 5, 1912	Gilbert Ralston	British-born American screenwriter (died 1999)
January 7, 1912	Charles Addams	American cartoonist (created The Addams Family) (died 1988)
January 8, 1912	José Ferrer	American actor (died 1992)
February 4, 1912	Byron Nelson	American golfer (died 2006)
March 14, 1912	Les Brown	American jazz musician (died 2001)
March 16, 1912	Pat Nixon	37th first lady of the United States (died 1993)
March 18, 1912	Art Gilmore	American actor (Dragnet, Adam-12) (died 2010)
April 5, 1912	John Le Mesurier	British actor (Dad's Army) (died 1983)
July 23, 1912	Michael Wilding	Actor (died 1979)
September 8, 1912	Leo Cherne	American economist (died 1999)
September 20, 1912	Ron Cochran	American television news journalist (died 1994)
September 29, 1912	Lukas Ammann	Swiss actor (Graf Yoster) (died 2017)
October 31, 1912	Dale Evans	American singer and actress (The Roy Rogers Show) (died 2001)
November 23, 1912	George O'Hanlon	American film and voice actor (voice of George Jetson on The Jetsons) (died 1989)
November 26, 1912	Eric Sevareid	American CBS news journalist (died 1992)
November 27, 1912	Connie Sawyer	American actress (died 2018)
December 22, 1912	Lady Bird Johnson	36th first lady of the United States (died 2007)
January 9, 1913	Richard Nixon	American president (died 1994)
January 28, 1913	Maurice Gosfield	American actor (The Phil Silvers Show) (died 1964)
February 25, 1913	Jim Backus	American actor (Gilligan's Island, Mr. Magoo) (died 1989)
April 3, 1913	David Markham	Actor (died 1983)
April 10, 1913	Bill Burns	Anchor (died 1997)
May 13, 1913	Jasmine Bligh	British presenter; one of the first BBC Television Service presenters of the 1930s (died 1991)
May 25, 1913	Richard Dimbleby	British journalist (BBC), commentator on state events, and presenter of current affairs programmes such as Panorama (died 1965)
June 13, 1913	Ralph Edwards	American host (died 2005)
July 3, 1913	Dorothy Kilgallen	American journalist and game show panelist (What's My Line?) (died 1965)
July 13, 1913	Dave Garroway	American journalist (The Today Show) (died 1982)
July 14, 1913	Gerald Ford	American president (died 2006)
August 18, 1913	Bryson Rash	American journalist (died 1992)
August 25, 1913	Don DeFore	American actor (The Adventures of Ozzie and Harriet, Hazel) (died 1993)
January 5, 1914	George Reeves	American actor (Adventures of Superman) (died 1959)
February 20, 1914	John Charles Daly	American news journalist and game show host (What's My Line?) (died 1991)
March 13, 1914	Olaf Pooley	Actor (died 2015)
March 15, 1914	Joe E. Ross	American actor (The Phil Silvers Show, Car 54, Where Are You?) (died 1982)
March 27, 1914	Budd Schulberg	American screenwriter (died 2009)
March 30, 1914	Stuart Novins	American journalist (died 1989)
April 1, 1914	Pete Carpenter	American arranger (died 1987)
April 14, 1914	Richard S. Salant	CBS executive (died 1993)
April 23, 1914	Harry Crane	Writer (died 1999)
May 12, 1914	Howard K. Smith	American anchorman (ABC Evening News) (died 2002)
June 25, 1914	Mavis Pugh	British character actress (You Rang, M'Lord?) (died 2006)
July 6, 1914	Vincent J. McMahon	American professional wrestling promoter (died 1984)
August 31, 1914	Richard Basehart	American actor (died 1984)
September 18, 1914	Harry Townes	American actor (The Fugitive) (died 2001)
October 26, 1914	Jackie Coogan	American actor (The Addams Family) (died 1984)
October 30, 1914	Anna Wing	British actress (EastEnders) (died 2013)
November 8, 1914	Norman Lloyd	American actor, director, and producer (Alfred Hitchcock Presents, St. Elsewhere) (died 2021)
December 2, 1914	Ray Walston	American actor (My Favorite Martian, Fast Times) (died 2001)
December 26, 1914	Geoffrey Lumsden	British character actor (Dad's Army) (died 1984)
January 5, 1915	John Tate	Australian actor (died 1979)
January 12, 1915	Martin Agronsky	American journalist (died 1999)
January 14, 1915	Mark Goodson	American television producer (died 1992)
January 19, 1915	Babette Henry	American television director (died 1980)
January 31, 1915	Garry Moore	American game series host and television personality (I've Got a Secret) (died 1993)
February 1, 1915	Art Balinger	American actor (Dragnet 1967, Adam-12) (died 2011)
February 12, 1915	Lorne Greene	American actor (Bonanza) (died 1987)
February 19, 1915	Dick Emery	English comic actor (The Dick Emery Show) (died 1983)
April 10, 1915	Harry Morgan	American actor (Dragnet, M*A*S*H) (died 2011)
May 30, 1915	Frank Blair	American journalist (died 1995)
September 14, 1915	Roy Wood Sr.	American host (died 1995)
September 22, 1915	Arthur Lowe	British actor (Coronation Street, Dad's Army) (died 1982)
October 9, 1915	James Underwood Crockett	American author, gardener, and television host (Crockett's Victory Garden) (died 1979)
October 30, 1915	Fred W. Friendly	American president of CBS News (died 1998)
November 2, 1915	Sidney Luft	American actor (died 2005)
December 22, 1915	Barbara Billingsley	American actress (Leave it to Beaver, Muppet Babies) (died 2010)
January 27, 1916	Merrill Mueller	American journalist (died 1980)
January 29, 1916	Bill Lawrence	American journalist (died 1972)
February 14, 1916	Edward Platt	American actor (Get Smart) (died 1974)
February 26, 1916	Jackie Gleason	American actor (The Honeymooners, The Jackie Gleason Show) (died 1987)
February 29, 1916	Dinah Shore	American actress (died 1994)
March 6, 1916	Virginia Gregg	American actress (Calvin and the Colonel, Dragnet) (died 1986)
March 17, 1916	Patricia Kennedy	Australian actress (died 2012)
March 31, 1916	Lucille Bliss	American actress (The Smurfs, Invader Zim) (died 2012)
April 4, 1916	David White	American actor (Bewitched) (died 1990)
April 26, 1916	Vic Perrin	American voice actor (The Outer Limits, Hanna-Barbera cartoons) (died 1989)
May 14, 1916	Del Moore	American actor (Life with Elizabeth, Bachelor Father, Dragnet 1967) (died 1970)
July 11, 1916	Reg Varney	English comedy actor (The Rag Trade, On the Buses) (died 2008)
July 23, 1916	Sandra Gould	American actress (Bewitched) (died 1999)
July 31, 1916	Bill Todman	American television producer (died 1979)
August 24, 1916	Hal Smith	American actor (The Andy Griffith Show) (died 1994)
October 13, 1916	Johnny Stearns	American actor and producer (Mary Kay and Johnny, The Tonight Show) (died 2001)
November 4, 1916	Walter Cronkite	American anchorman (CBS Evening News) (died 2009)
February 6, 1917	Zsa Zsa Gabor	Actress (died 2016)
February 8, 1917	Jack Drees	Sportscaster (died 1988)
March 2, 1917	Desi Arnaz	Cuban-born performer (I Love Lucy) (died 1986)
March 30, 1917	Herbert Anderson	American actor (Dennis the Menace) (died 1994)
April 2, 1917	Dabbs Greer	American actor (The Fugitive, Little House on the Prairie) (died 2007)
April 16, 1917	Barry Nelson	American actor (Climax!) (died 2007)
May 16, 1917	George Gaynes	Finnish-born American actor (Punky Brewster, The Days and Nights of Molly Dodd) (died 2016)
May 21, 1917	Raymond Burr	Canadian actor (Perry Mason, Ironside) (died 1993)
May 29, 1917	John F. Kennedy	American president (died 1963); his performance in the first presidential debates and assassination are among the most important events in television history.
June 7, 1917	Dean Martin	American actor, singer (The Dean Martin Show) (died 1995)
June 9, 1917	McDonald Hobley	British continuity announcer (BBC Television) (died 1987)
June 10, 1917	Lena Horne	Actress (died 2010)
July 10, 1917	Don Herbert	American television host (Watch Mr. Wizard) (died 2007)
July 14, 1917	Douglas Edwards	American anchorman (CBS Evening News) (died 1990)
August 24, 1917	Dennis James	Game show host (died 1997)
August 29, 1917	Isabel Sanford	Actress (died 2004)
September 4, 1917	Hilary Mason	British actress (Maid Marian and her Merry Men) (died 2006)
September 29, 1917	Chandler Cowles	Actor (died 1997)
October 16, 1917	Alice Pearce	American actress (Bewitched) (died 1966)
October 28, 1917	Jack Soo	Japanese-American actor (Barney Miller) (died 1979)
December 17, 1917	Elyse Knox	American actress (died 2012)
December 22, 1917	Gene Rayburn	American television personality (Match Game, The Tonight Show) (died 1999)
February 15, 1918	Allan Arbus	American actor (M*A*S*H) (died 2013)
February 22, 1918	Don Pardo	American television announcer (Saturday Night Live) (died 2014)
March 12, 1918	Frank Overton	Actor (died 1967)
March 21, 1918	Arturo Castro	Actor (died 1975)
March 25, 1918	Howard Cosell	American television personality (The Tonight Show) (died 1995)
April 7, 1918	William Eythe	American actor (died 1957)
April 8, 1918	Betty Ford	38th first lady of the United States (died 2011)
May 1, 1918	Jack Paar	American television personality (The Tonight Show) (died 2004)
May 9, 1918	Mike Wallace	American anchorman (60 Minutes) (died 2012)
June 30, 1918	Isobel Barnett	British broadcast personality (What's My Line?) (suicide 1980)
July 26, 1918	Stacy Harris	American actor (Dragnet, The Life and Legend of Wyatt Earp) (died 1973)
August 7, 1918	Jane Adams	American actress (died 2014)
August 7, 1918	Hutton Gibson	American writer (died 2020)
September 14, 1918	Bill Hanrahan	American announcer (died 1996)
November 4, 1918	Art Carney	American actor (The Honeymooners) (died 2003)
November 7, 1918	Billy Graham	American televangelist (died 2018)
December 2, 1918	Milton DeLugg	American bandleader and composer (Broadway Open House, Macy's Thanksgiving Day Parade) (died 2015)
December 19, 1918	Lee Rich	American film and television producer (died 1976)
December 27, 1918	Paul Gilbert	American actor (died 1976)
January 1, 1919	Carole Landis	American actress (died 1948)
January 13, 1919	Robert Stack	American actor (The Untouchables, Unsolved Mysteries) (died 2003)
January 14, 1919	Andy Rooney	American writer (died 2011)
February 11, 1919	Eva Gabor	Hungarian actress (Green Acres) (died 1995)
March 12, 1919	Frank Campanella	Actor (died 2006)
March 19, 1919	Nat King Cole	Actor (died 1965)
May 4, 1919	John Hope	American meteorologist (The Weather Channel), named Hurricane Camille for his daughter (died 2002)
June 12, 1919	Uta Hagen	American actress (died 2004)
June 17, 1919	Ray Scott	American sportcaster (died 1998)
June 18, 1919	Mel Brandt	American actor (died 2008)
August 19, 1919	Philip Perlman	American actor (died 2015)
September 4, 1919	Howard Morris	American actor (Your Show of Shows, The Flintstones, The Jetsons, The Andy Griffith Show, The Magilla Gorilla Show, The Archie Show, DuckTales, Garfield and Friends, Cow and Chicken, I Am Weasel) (died 2005)
September 28, 1919	Tom Harmon	American actor (died 1990)
October 14, 1919	Shaun Sutton	British writer, director, and producer; longest-serving Head of Drama at BBC Television (died 2004)
November 4, 1919	Shirley Mitchell	American actress (died 2013)
November 15, 1919	Joseph Wapner	American judge (died 2017)
November 15, 1919	Martin Balsam	American actor (died 1996)
November 19, 1919	Alan Young	English-born American actor (Mister Ed, DuckTales) (died 2016)
December 11, 1919	Cliff Michelmore	English broadcast presenter (died 2016)
December 19, 1919	Bill Morey	Actor (died 2003)

=== Births (1920–1924) ===
Date	Name	Notability
January 9, 1920	Bunney Brooke	Australian actress and casting agent (Number 96) (died 2000)
January 14, 1920	George Herman	CBS journalist (died 2005)
January 30, 1920	Michael Anderson	English director (died 2018)
February 18, 1920	Bill Cullen	American game series host (The Price Is Right, I've Got a Secret) (died 1990)
February 26, 1920	Tony Randall	American actor (The Odd Couple) (died 2004)
February 29, 1920	Arthur Franz	American actor (died 2006)
February 29, 1920	James Mitchell	American actor (died 2010)
March 16, 1920	John Addison	English screen composer (died 1998)
March 25, 1920	Bill MacPhail	American television sports executive (died 1996)
April 17, 1920	Arnold Yarrow	English actor (EastEnders) and screenwriter (died 2024)
June 18, 1920	Ian Carmichael	English actor (The World of Wooster) (died 2010)
July 10, 1920	David Brinkley	American anchorman (The Huntley-Brinkley Report) (died 2003)
July 18, 1920	Dolph Sweet	American actor (Gimme a Break!, Another World) (died 1985)
August 6, 1920	Selma Diamond	Canadian-born American actress (Night Court) (died 1985)
August 18, 1920	Shelley Winters	American actress (Roseanne) (died 2006)
August 19, 1920	Joseph Wershba	American journalist (died 2011)
October 27, 1920	Nanette Fabray	American actress (One Day at a Time) (died 2018)
October 27, 1920	Phyllis Hill	American actress (died 1993)
November 1, 1920	James J. Kilpatrick	American journalist (died 2010)
November 20, 1920	Lee Guber	American theater impresario (died 1988)
November 25, 1920	Noel Neill	American actress (Adventures of Superman) (died 2016)
November 25, 1920	Ricardo Montalbán	Actor (Fantasy Island, Freakazoid!, Kim Possible) (died 2009)
December 7, 1920	Reuven Frank	American broadcast news executive (died 2006)
January 6, 1921	Cary Middlecoff	Golfer (died 1998)
January 15, 1921	Frank Thornton	English actor (Are You Being Served?) (died 2013)
January 15, 1921	Dehl Berti	Actor (died 1991)
February 1, 1921	Peter Sallis	English actor (Last of the Summer Wine, Wallace and Gromit) (died 2017)
February 14, 1921	Hugh Downs	American radio and television broadcaster (died 2020)
February 24, 1921	Abe Vigoda	American actor (Barney Miller) (died 2016)
March 22, 1921	Caryl Ledner	American writer (died 1984)
April 5, 1921	Christopher Hewett	British actor (Mr. Belvedere) (died 2001)
April 22, 1921	Charlotte Lawrence	actress (died 1993)
May 14, 1921	Richard Deacon	American actor (The Dick Van Dyke Show, Leave It to Beaver) (died 1984)
May 21, 1921	Howard Reig	American announcer (died 2008)
June 15, 1921	Erroll Garner	American composer (died 1977)
July 6, 1921	Nancy Reagan	Actress and 40th first lady of the United States (died 2016)
July 15, 1921	Jean Heywood	British actress (Boys from the Blackstuff) (died 2019)
July 23, 1921	Calvert DeForest	American actor (died 2007)
July 24, 1921	Billy Taylor	American jazz pianist (died 2010)
August 8, 1921	William Asher	American producer, director and writer (Bewitched) (died 2012)
August 9, 1921	Ernest Angley	American Christian evangelist (died 2021)
August 21, 1921	John Osteen	Pastor (died 1999)
August 25, 1921	Monty Hall	Canadian TV host (died 2017)
August 27, 1921	Leo Penn	Actor (died 1998)
August 31, 1921	Madeline Amgott	American television news producer (died 2014)
September 12, 1921	Frank McGee	Journalist (died 1974)
September 14, 1921	Bud Palmer	Basketball player (died 2013)
September 24, 1921	Sheila MacRae	English-born American actress (The Honeymooners, General Hospital) (died 2014)
September 24, 1921	Jim McKay	American television sports journalist (died 2008)
October 1, 1921	James Whitmore	American actor (died 2009)
October 17, 1921	Tom Poston	American actor (Newhart) (died 2007)
November 14, 1921	Brian Keith	American actor (Family Affair) (died 1997)
November 22, 1921	Rodney Dangerfield	American comedian and actor (The Dean Martin Show) (died 2004)
December 11, 1921	Liz Smith	English character actress (The Royle Family) (died 2016)
December 26, 1921	Steve Allen	American television personality (The Tonight Show) (died 2000)
January 17, 1922	Betty White	American actress (The Mary Tyler Moore Show, The Golden Girls, Hot in Cleveland) (died 2021)
January 21, 1922	Telly Savalas	American actor (Kojak) (died 1994)
January 30, 1922	Dick Martin	American comedian (Laugh-In) (died 2008)
February 8, 1922	Audrey Meadows	American actress (The Honeymooners) (died 1996)
February 9, 1922	Kathryn Grayson	American actress (Murder, She Wrote) (died 2010)
February 18, 1922	Allan Melvin	American actor (Magilla Gorilla, The Brady Bunch, All in the Family) (died 2008)
February 24, 1922	Steven Hill	American actor (Law & Order, Mission: Impossible) (died 2016)
March 5, 1922	James Noble	American actor (Benson) (died 2016)
March 6, 1922	Burt Balaban	American film producer and director (died 1965)
March 11, 1922	Paul Alter	American director (died 2011)
March 20, 1922	Carl Reiner	American actor, writer, director and producer (Your Show of Shows, The Dick Van Dyke Show) (died 2020)
March 23, 1922	Marty Allen	American comedian and actor, "The Darling of Daytime TV" (died 2018)
April 3, 1922	Doris Day	American actress and singer (The Doris Day Show) (died 2019)
April 5, 1922	Gale Storm	American actress (My Little Margie) (died 2009)
April 15, 1922	Michael Ansara	Syrian-American actor (Law of the Plainsman, Broken Arrow, Star Trek, Batman: The Animated Series) (d. 2013)
April 18, 1922	Barbara Hale	American actress (Perry Mason) (died 2017)
April 19, 1922	Billy Joe Patton	American golfer (died 2011)
April 27, 1922	Jack Klugman	American actor (The Odd Couple, Quincy) (died 2012)
May 7, 1922	Darren McGavin	American actor (Kolchak: The Night Stalker) (died 2006)
May 10, 1922	Nancy Walker	American actress (Rhoda, Bounty paper towel commercials) (died 1992)
May 13, 1922	Beatrice Arthur	American actress (Maude, The Golden Girls) (died 2009)
May 18, 1922	Bill Macy	American actor (Maude) (died 2019)
May 22, 1922	Quinn Martin	American producer (The Fugitive, The F.B.I., The Streets of San Francisco) (died 1987)
May 27, 1922	Christopher Lee	Actor (died 2015)
June 9, 1922	George Axelrod	American screenwriter (died 2003)
June 10, 1922	Judy Garland	American actress (died 1969)
June 24, 1922	Jack Carter	American comedian, actor, and television presenter (died 2015)
July 21, 1922	Mollie Sugden	British actress (Are You Being Served?) (died 2009)
July 22, 1922	Dan Rowan	American comedian (Laugh-In) (died 1987)
July 27, 1922	Norman Lear	American producer (All in the Family, Sanford and Son and many others) (died 2023)
August 1, 1922	Arthur Hill	Canadian-born actor (died 2006)
September 1, 1922	Yvonne De Carlo	American actress (The Munsters) (died 2007)
October 9, 1922	Fyvush Finkel	American stage and television actor (Boston Public). (died 2016)
October 22, 1922	Neal Hefti	American composer (died 2008)
October 31, 1922	Barbara Bel Geddes	American actress (Dallas) (died 2005)
November 13, 1922	Jack Narz	American game show host and announcer (died 2008)
November 13, 1922	Madeleine Sherwood	Canadian actress (The Flying Nun) (died 2016)
December 9, 1922	Redd Foxx	American comedian (Sanford and Son) (died 1991)
December 14, 1922	Don Hewitt	American television news producer (died 2009)
December 20, 1922	Charita Bauer	American actress (The Guiding Light) (died 1985)
December 21, 1922	Paul Winchell	American actor (died 2005)
December 22, 1922	Ruth Roman	American actress (Murder, She Wrote) (died 1999)
January 3, 1923	Hank Stram	American football coach and sportscaster (died 2005)
January 6, 1923	Charles "Red" Donley	American sports and news anchor (died 1998)
January 8, 1923	Larry Storch	American actor (F-Troop) (died 2022)
January 19, 1923	Jean Stapleton	American actress (All in the Family) (died 2013)
January 20, 1923	Diana Douglas	American actress (died 2015)
January 23, 1923	Florence Halop	American actress (St. Elsewhere, Night Court) (died 1986)
February 4, 1923	Conrad Bain	Canadian-American actor (Maude, Diff'rent Strokes) (died 2013)
March 6, 1923	Ed McMahon	American game show host and announcer (The Tonight Show, Star Search) (died 2009)
March 11, 1923	Terence Alexander	English actor (Bergerac) (died 2009)
March 30, 1923	Frank Field	American meteorologist (WNBC-TV, The Tonight Show) (died 2023)
April 2, 1923	Gloria Henry	American actress (Dennis the Menace) (died 2021)
April 4, 1923	Peter Vaughan	British character actor (Porridge, Game of Thrones) (died 2016)
April 8, 1923	Edward Mulhare	Actor (died 1997)
April 10, 1923	Jane Kean	American actress and singer (The Jackie Gleason Show, The Honeymooners) (died 2013)
April 13, 1923	Don Adams	American actor (Get Smart, Inspector Gadget) (died 2005)
April 17, 1923	Lon McCallister	American actor (died 2005)
April 17, 1923	Harry Reasoner	American journalist (died 1991)
April 22, 1923	Aaron Spelling	American movie and television producer (Beverly Hills, 90210) (died 2006)
April 30, 1923	Al Lewis	American actor (The Munsters) (died 2006)
May 21, 1923	Evelyn Ward	American actor (died 2012)
May 26, 1923	James Arness	American actor (Gunsmoke) (died 2011)
July 8, 1923	Hal Scott	American sportcaster (died 2010)
July 15, 1923	Herb Sargent	American writer (died 2005)
July 22, 1923	Bob Dole	American politician (died 2021)
July 25, 1923	Estelle Getty	American actress (The Golden Girls) (died 2008)
July 28, 1923	Ray Ellis	American conductor (died 2008)
July 29, 1923	George Burditt	American writer (died 2013)
August 15, 1923	Rose Marie	American actress (The Dick Van Dyke Show) (died 2017)
August 21, 1923	Chris Schenkel	American sportscaster (died 2005)
September 7, 1923	Peter Lawford	American actor (died 1984)
September 9, 1923	Cliff Robertson	American actor (died 2011)
September 17, 1923	David Oreck	American salesman (died 2023)
September 20, 1923	Jimmy Perry	English scriptwriter (Dad's Army) (died 2016)
September 28, 1923	William Windom	American actor (Murder, She Wrote) (died 2012)
October 5, 1923	Glynis Johns	British actress (died 2024)
October 10, 1923	Murray Walker	English motorsport commentator (died 2021)
November 7, 1923	Bob Young	American announcer (died 2011)
November 12, 1923	Ernie Anderson	American announcer (died 1997)
November 20, 1923	Danny Dayton	American actor (died 1999)
November 29, 1923	Frank Reynolds	American television journalist (died 1983)
December 10, 1923	Harold Gould	American actor (Rhoda, The Golden Girls) (died 2010)
December 12, 1923	Bob Barker	American game series presenter (The New Price Is Right) (died 2023)
December 23, 1923	Leonard B. Stern	Screenwriter (died 2011)
December 29, 1923	Dina Merrill	Actress (died 2017)
January 14, 1924	Carole Cook	American actress (died 2023)
January 19, 1924	Nicholas Colasanto	American actor and director (Cheers) (died 1985)
January 21, 1924	Benny Hill	English comedian (died 1992)
January 29, 1924	Enrico Simonetti	Italian musician and presenter (Simonetti Show) (died 1978)
January 29, 1924	Dorothy Malone	American actress (Peyton Place) (died 2018)
February 14, 1924	Gabe Pressman	American journalist (died 2017)
February 19, 1924	Lee Marvin	American actor (died 1987)
February 28, 1924	Bettye Ackerman	American actress (died 2006)
March 3, 1924	John Woodnutt	English actor (died 2006)
March 3, 1924	Lys Assia	Swiss singer, first winner of Eurovision Song Contest (died 2018)
March 8, 1924	Sean McClory	Irish actor (The Californians) (died 2003)
March 22, 1924	Bill Wendell	American announcer (died 1999)
March 24, 1924	Norman Fell	American actor (Three's Company) (died 1998)
March 25, 1924	Roberts Blossom	American actor (died 2011)
April 15, 1924	Rikki Fulton	Scottish comedian (Scotch and Wry) (died 2004)
April 20, 1924	Nina Foch	American actress (died 2008)
May 1, 1924	Art Fleming	American stage, radio and television personality (Jeopardy!) (died 1995)
May 1, 1924	Terry Southern	American screenwriter (died 1995)
May 2, 1924	Theodore Bikel	Austrian actor (Babylon 5: In the Beginning) (died 2015)
May 6, 1924	Patricia Kennedy Lawford	American socialite (died 2006)
May 12, 1924	Tony Hancock	English comic performer (Hancock's Half Hour) (suicide 1968)
May 18, 1924	Jack Whitaker	Sportscaster (died 2019)
June 3, 1924	Colleen Dewhurst	Movie and television actress (died 1991)
June 12, 1924	George H. W. Bush	American president (died 2018)
June 17, 1924	Marie Torre	American television personality (died 1997)
June 24, 1924	Sidney Lumet	American screenwriter (died 2011)
June 26, 1924	Richard Bull	American movie and television actor (Little House on the Prairie) (died 2014)
July 10, 1924	Gloria Stroock	American actress (died 2024)
July 11, 1924	Brett Somers	Canadian-born American actress and comedian (The Odd Couple, Match Game '73) (died 2007)
July 21, 1924	Don Knotts	American actor (The Andy Griffith Show, Three's Company) (died 2006)
July 29, 1924	Joseph Cranston	American producer (died 2014)
August 2, 1924	Carroll O'Connor	American actor (All in the Family, In the Heat of the Night) (died 2001)
August 15, 1924	Werner Abrolat	German actor (Tatort) (died 1997)
August 21, 1924	Jack Buck	Sportscaster (died 2002)
August 31, 1924	Buddy Hackett	Actor (died 2003)
September 10, 1924	Georgiana Young	TV actress (died 2007)
September 19, 1924	Don Harron	Canadian comedian and actor (Hee Haw) (died 2015)
September 20, 1924	Paul K. Niven Jr.	TV journalist (died 1970)
September 24, 1924	Bob Herron	American stuntman and actor (died 2021)
October 1, 1924	Jimmy Carter	Former American president (died 2024)
October 21, 1924	Joyce Randolph	American actress (The Honeymooners) (died 2024)
October 21, 1924	Julie Wilson	American actress (died 2015)
November 18, 1924	Les Lye	Canadian actor (You Can't Do That On Television) (died 2009)
November 21, 1924	Joseph Campanella	American actor (Mannix, The Guiding Light, Days of Our Lives) (died 2018)
November 23, 1924	Anita Linda	Filipina actress (Tayong Dalawa) (died 2020)
December 12, 1924	Ed Koch	American judge (died 2013)
December 13, 1924	Maria Riva	American actress (died 2025)
December 14, 1924	Marge Redmond	American actress (The Flying Nun, Matlock) (died 2020)
December 23, 1924	Floyd Kalber	American television journalist (died 2004)

== See also ==
- Table of years in television
