= List of television shows set in Newcastle upon Tyne =

This is a list of television shows set in Newcastle upon Tyne.

- 55 Degrees North
- Auf Wiedersehen, Pet (some segments)
- Boy Meets Girl
- Breeze Block
- Byker Grove
- Finney
- Firm Friends
- Geordie Racer
- Geordie Shore
- Hebburn
- Inspector George Gently
- Lawless
- The Likely Lads
- Our Friends in the North
- The Paper Lads
- Quayside
- Spender
- Super Gran
- Vera
- Whatever Happened to the Likely Lads?
- When the Boat Comes In
- Wire in the Blood
- The Search For Raoul Moat
