= Paul K. Niven Jr. =

American television journalist

Paul K. Niven Jr
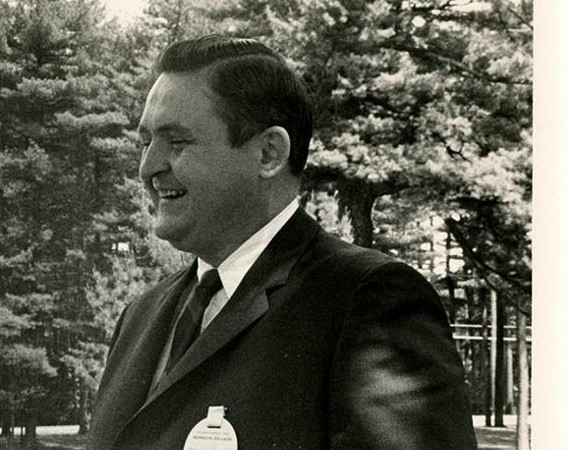
- Born: September 20, 1924; Boston, Massachusetts
- Died: January 8, 1970 (aged 45); Washington DC
- Education: London school of Economics (1946-1947)
- Alma mater: Bowdoin College (1946)
- Occupation: Journalist
- Parent(s): Paul K. Niven Sr (1892-1974), Dorthy Nichols (1889-1970)

Paul Kendall Niven Jr. (September 20, 1924 – January 7, 1970) was CBS television journalist and presidential debate moderator. He was one of Ed Murrow's team of reporters at CBS. Born in Boston, Massachusetts, he and his family returned to Brunswick, Maine in 1931. He was the son of Paul K. Niven Sr., the editor and newspaper publisher of The Brunswick Record.

== Early life ==
Niven grew up in Brunswick, Maine. His childhood home was located next to Bowdoin College and across from Pickard Field. Niven graduated from Bowdoin College with an A.B. degree in 1946.

== Military service ==
He joined the US Army Air Force in 1943, and left the service in 1946.

== Career ==
After attending post-graduate school at the London School of Economics and Political Science Niven went to work on the London staff of CBS news. Niven also wrote for the Manchester Guardian. While in London Niven covered the British 1950–1951 elections, the 1953 coronation of Queen Elizabeth. From France he covered the United Nations Assembly. Niven also documented the rise of Nikita Khrushchev, and the triumph of Van Cliburn in Moscow.

After working in England. Niven was hired to head up the new news department for WTOP, just purchased from CBS station in Washington, DC, by Washington Post publisher Phil Graham. He was recruited by Ed Murrow to work for CBS. He was the moderator of the public affairs television series Face the Nation from 1961 thru 1965. From January to October 1959 Niven was Moscow bureau chief for CBS News and heard daily on the CBS World News Roundup radio show. On October 8, 1958, the Soviet Union closed the CBS News Bureau in Moscow and ordered Niven to leave Russia because the CBS show Playhouse 90 had broadcast "The Plot to Kill Stalin" on September 25. Niven left on October 13.

== National Educational Television ==
On July 7, 1966, Niven left CBS for National Educational Television as its lead correspondent, for which he interviewed Svetlana Alliluyeva, daughter of Soviet dictator Josef Stalin. She said that since her father's death (on March 5, 1953), the Soviet Union had not changed despite "de-Stalinization" and that Russia's leaders had even taken "steps backwards." She was interviewed in connection with the publication of her memoir, Far-Away Music.

== Burma experience ==
Niven spent the last six months of 1956 touring Burma for a See It Now show.

== Death ==
Niven died from head trauma as a result of house fire at his home in Washington, DC, on January 8, 1970.
