= List of Bulgarian television series =

== Series produced by BNT ==
- 1971 On each kilometer (На всеки километър)
- 1989 Men without a mustache (Мъже без мустаци)
- 1990 Fathers and Sons (Бащи и синове)
- 1999 Clinic on the third floor (Клиника на третия етаж)
- 1999 Danube bridge (Дунав мост)
- 2006 Good day mister Jasmin (Добър ден,господин Жасмин)
- 2006 Sparrows in October (Врабците през октомври)
- 2008 Outcasts (Хъшове)
- 2008 Lyudmil and Ruslana (Людмил и Руслана)
- 2011 Undercover (Под прикритие)
- 2011 The English Neighbour (Английският съсед)
- 2013 Not Given Away (Недадените)
- 2013 Fourth Power (Четвърта власт)
- 2019 For weightlifters(При щангистите)
- 2019 Father's Day (Денят на бащата)
- 2019 Blue Birds Island (Островът на сините птици)
- 2019 Rumbata, I and Ronaldo (Румбата, аз и Роналдо)
- 2021 The portal (Порталът)
- 2022 Me and my wives (Аз и моите жени)
- 2023 Wines (Вина)
- 2023 The war of letters (Войната на буквите)

== Series produced by BTV ==
- 2002 She and He (Тя и Той)
- 2010 Glass Home (Стъклен дом)
- 2011 House Arrest (Домашен арест)
- 2011 Seven Hours Difference (Седем часа разлика)
- 2011 Great Bulgaria (Велика България)
- 2011 Sofia Residents in Excess (Столичани в повече)
- 2012 Where is Magi? (Къде е Маги)
- 2012 Revolution Z (Революция Z)
- 2013 The Family (Фамилията)
- 2015 Liaisons (Връзки)
- 2016 Players (Играчи)
- 2018 Dear Heirs (Скъпи Наследници)
- 2020 Sunny Beach
- 2021 The Scars (Белези)
- 2021 Daddies (Татковци)
- 2022 Don't think for me (Мен не ме мислете)
- 2023 Sofia at home (София вкъщи)
- 2024 Alpha (Алфа)
- 2026 Faith, Hope, Love (Вяра, Надежда, Любов)

== Series producing by Nova Television ==
- 2004 Hotel Bulgaria
- 2004 Sea Salt (Морска сол)
- 2008 Forbidden Love (Забранена любов)
- 2011 Condominium (Етажна собственост)
- 2012 Married with children in Bulgaria (Женени с деца в България)
- 2012 Payback (Отплата)
- 2016 Stolen life (Откраднат живот)
- 2017 We, our and your (Ние, нашите и вашите)
- 2018 Suburban cops (Полицаите от края на града)
- 2019 Devil's Throat (Дяволското гърло)
- 2019 Mr. X and the sea (Господин X и морето)
- 2019 The Road of Honor (Пътят на честта)
- 2020 All Inclusive
- 2020 Strawberry moon (Ягодова луна)
- 2020 Brothers (Братя)
- 2021 Wanted Department (Отдел Издирване)
- 2022 The lies in us (Лъжите в нас)
- 2022 With a river of heart (С река на сърцето)
- 2023 Very much my man (Много мой човек)
- 2023 Walk of fame (Алея на славата)
- 2023 The cell (Клетката)
- 2025 Mothers (Майките)
- 2026 Rainmarks (Дъжда Оставя Следи)

== Series producing by TV7 (Bulgaria) ==
- 2006 Unexpected Turn (Неочакван обрат)
- 2012 Mitrani Law Firm (Кантора Митрани)
- 2012 Morning Show (Сутрешен блок)
- 2013 The Tree of Life (Дървото на живота)
- 2013 Sex, Lies & TV: Eight's day week (Секс, лъжи и ТВ: Осем дни в седмицата)
- 2013 Shmenti Kapeli: The Legend (Шменти Капели: Легендата)
- 2014 The Sign of Bulgarian (Знакът на българина)

== Series producing by Fox Life ==
- 2016 Liaisons (Връзки)

== Series producing by TV+ (Bulgaria) ==
- 2012 Merry company (Весела компания)
