= List of television shows set in Dallas =

This is a list of television shows set in Dallas, Texas:

== B ==
- Barney & Friends
- The Benefactor
- Big Rich Texas

== D ==
- Dallas
- Dallas Divas & Daughters
- Deadly Cinema

== F ==
- Fast N' Loud

== G ==
- GCB
- The Good Guys

== H ==
- Halt and Catch Fire

== L ==
- Lonestar

== N ==
- The Naughty Kitchen with Chef Blythe Beck

== Q ==
- Queen of the South

== R ==
- The Real Housewives of Dallas

== S ==
- Sons of Thunder

== T ==
- True Blood (Season 2)

== W ==
- Walker, Texas Ranger
