= 1925 in television =

The year 1925 in television involved some significant events. Below is a list of television-related events during 1925.

== Global television events ==
Month	Day	Event
March	25	John Logie Baird performed the first public demonstration of his "televisor" at the Selfridges department store on London's Oxford Street. The demonstrations of moving silhouette images continued through April. The system consisted of 30 lines and 12.5 pictures per second.
June	13	Charles Francis Jenkins achieves the first synchronized transmission of a moving silhouette (shadowgraphs) and sound, using 48 lines, and a mechanical system. A 10-minute movie of a miniature windmill in motion was sent across 8 kilometers from Anacostia to Washington, DC. The images were viewed by representatives of the National Bureau of Standards, the United States Navy, the Department of Commerce, and others. Jenkins termed this "the first public demonstration of radiovision".
July	13	Vladimir Zworykin applies for a patent for color television.
c. August–October		Zworykin first demonstrates his electric camera tube and receiver for Westinghouse corporation executives, transmitting the still image of an "X". The picture is said to be dim, with low contrast and poor definition.
October	2	John Baird achieves the first live television image with tone graduations (not silhouette or duotone images) in his laboratory. Baird brings office boy William Edward Taynton in front of the camera to become the first face televised. But the rate of five images per second does not show realistic movement.

== Births ==
Date	Name	Notability
January 8	Steve Holland	U.S. actor (died 1997)
January 11	Grant Tinker	U.S. producer, NBC network executive, "The Man Who Saved NBC" (died 2016)
January 12	Katherine MacGregor	U.S. actress (Little House on the Prairie) (died 2018)
January 23	Danny Arnold	U.S. producer, actor and stand-up comedian (died 1995)
January 28	Scotty Bloch	U.S. actress (died 2018)
February 27	William David Powell	TV presenter (died 2015)
March 4	Inezita Barroso	American television writer (died 1968)
April 22	George Cole	U.K. actor (Minder) (died 2015)
April 22	Ken Coleman	Sportscaster (died 2003)
May 2	Roscoe Lee Browne	U.S. actor (died 2007)
June 1	Richard Erdman	U.S. actor (died 2019)
June 8	Barbara Bush	41st First Lady of the United States (died 2018)
June 19	Charlie Drake	U.K. comic performer (The Worker) (died 2006)
June 25	June Lockhart	U.S. actress (Lassie, Lost in Space) (died 2025)
June 29	Cara Williams	U.S. actress (died 2021)
July 4	Eric Fleming	U.S. actor (died 1966)
July 6	Merv Griffin	U.S. talk show host, producer (Jeopardy!, Wheel of Fortune) (died 2007)
July 6	John Rich	U.S. producer (died 2005)
July 23	Gloria DeHaven	U.S. actress (died 2016)
August 15	Mike Connors	U.S. actor (Mannix) (died 2017)
August 22	Honor Blackman	U.K. actor (The Avengers) (died 2020)
August 29	Dick Cusack	U.S. actor (died 2003)
October 6	Shana Alexander	American journalist (died 2005)
October 13	Frank D. Gilroy	American director (died 2015)
October 16	Angela Lansbury	U.K. actress (Murder, She Wrote) (died 2022)
October 19	Bernard Hepton	U.K. actor, director (Colditz, The Six Wives of Henry VIII) (died 2018)
October 23	Johnny Carson	U.S. comedian, talk show host (The Tonight Show) (died 2005)
October 27	Mary Kay Stearns	U.S. actress (Mary Kay and Johnny) (died 2018)
November 4	Doris Roberts	U.S. actress (died 2016)
November 6	Nan Winton	U.K. news presenter (died 2019)
November 11	June Whitfield	U.K. comic actress (Terry and June, Absolutely Fabulous) (died 2018)
November 17	Rock Hudson	U.S. actor (McMillan and Wife) (died 1985)
November 24	Stephen Hancock	U.K. actor (Coronation Street) (died 2015)
November 25	Jack Clark	American game show host (died 1988)
November 29	Robert Hardy	U.K. actor (All Creatures Great and Small) (died 2017)
December 13	Dick Van Dyke	U.S. entertainer (The Dick Van Dyke Show, Diagnosis: Murder)
