= 1935 in television =

The year 1935 in television involved some significant events. Below is a list of television-related events during 1935.

== Events ==
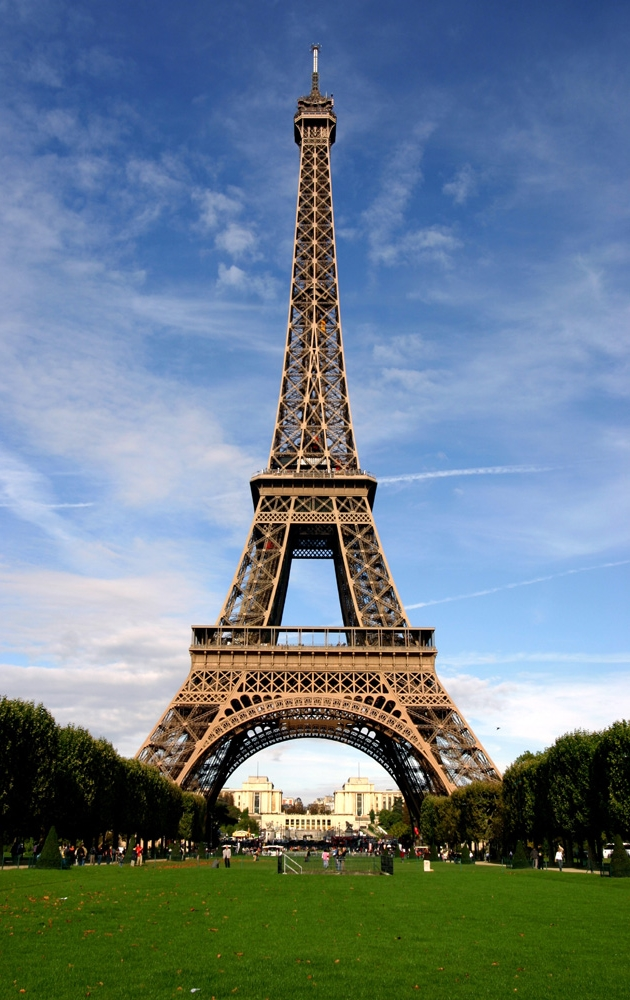
April 26: Eiffel Tower broadcasting.

- March 22 – Germany begins regular television service in Berlin (Deutscher Fernseh-Rundfunk), from the Fernsehsender Paul Nipkow, using a 180-line electronic television system. It is generally only seen in public viewing rooms seating 30 people each.
- April 26 – France begins broadcasting regular transmissions from the top of the Eiffel Tower.
- September 11 – Final transmission of John Logie Baird’s 30-line television system by the BBC. The BBC begins preparations for a regular high definition broadcasting service from Alexandra Palace.

== TV Shows ==
Skyline-1935-UK

== Births ==
- January 3 – Richard Martin, British director
- January 8 – Elvis Presley, singer and actor (died 1977)
- January 9
  - Bob Denver, actor (Gilligan's Island), (died 2005)
  - Dick Enberg, sports commentator (died 2017)
- January 16 – Russ McCubbin, actor (Cheyenne), (died 2018)
- February 16 – Sonny Bono, singer, actor, politician, comedian (The Sonny & Cher Comedy Hour), (died 1998)
- February 17
  - Chabelo, Mexican actor and host, (died 2023)
  - Christina Pickles, English actress (Guiding Light, St. Elsewhere)
- February 25 – Sally Jessy Raphael, talk show hostess
- March 1 – Robert Conrad, actor (The Wild Wild West, Baa Baa Black Sheep), (died 2020)
- March 9 – Joseph Gallison, actor (Days of Our Lives)
- March 15
  - Jimmy Swaggart, televangelist (died 2025)
  - Judd Hirsch, actor (Taxi, Dear John, Numb3rs)
- March 18 – John Hamblin, English-born Australian children's television presenter (died 2022)
- March 20 – Ted Bessell, actor and director (That Girl) (died 1996)
- March 24 – Mary Berry, English food writer
- April 4 – Kenneth Mars, actor, (died 2011)
- April 13 – Lyle Waggoner, actor (The Carol Burnett Show, Wonder Woman) (died 2020)
- April 19 – Dudley Moore, English-born comedy actor (died 2002)
- May 8 – Salome Jens, actress
- May 25 – Victoria Shaw, Australian actress (died 1988)
- May 27 – Lee Meriwether, actress (Barnaby Jones, The Munsters Today, All My Children)
- June 21 – Monte Markham, actor (The New Perry Mason)
- June 28 – John Inman, English actor (Are You Being Served?), (died 2007)
- July 3 – Al Primo, American television news executive (died 2022)
- July 9 – Michael Williams, English actor (died 2001)
- July 13 – Jack Kemp, football player and politician (died 2009)
- July 15
  - Alex Karras, football player and actor (Webster), (died 2012)
  - Ken Kercheval, actor (Dallas), (died 2019)
- July 17
  - Donald Sutherland, Canadian actor (Dirty Sexy Money, Crossing Lines, Commander in Chief) (died 2024)
  - Diahann Carroll, actress and singer (Julia), (died 2019)
- August 8 – Donald P. Bellisario, American television producer
- August 10 – Peter S. Fischer, American television writer (died 2023)
- August 26 – Geraldine Ferraro, American politician and commentator (died 2011)
- August 28 – Sonny Shroyer, actor (The Dukes of Hazzard)
- September 21 – Henry Gibson, actor (Rowan & Martin's Laugh-In, The Wuzzles, Rocket Power), (died 2009)
- September 24 – Sean McCann, Canadian actor (died 2019)
- October 1 – Julie Andrews, English-born actress and singer
- October 3 – Madlyn Rhue, actress (died 2003)
- October 6 – Bruno Sammartino, professional wrestler (died 2018)
- October 18 – Peter Boyle, actor (Everybody Loves Raymond), (died 2006)
- October 19 – Jerry Bishop, American announcer (died 2020)
- October 20 – Jerry Orbach, actor (Law & Order), (died 2004)
- November 27 – Verity Lambert, English producer (died 2007)
- December 1 – Woody Allen, comedy writer, comedian, actor, screenwriter, film director
- December 12 – Al Harrington, actor (Hawaii Five-O) (died 2021)
- December 21 – Phil Donahue, talk show host (died 2024)
