= 1933 in television =

The year 1933 in television involved some significant events. Below is a list of television-related events during 1933.

== Events ==
- January 23 – W9XAL in Kansas City begins broadcasting.
- January 24 – John Cameron Swayze begins his daily Journal-Post News Flashes on W9XAL, which is simulcast by KMBC radio.
- April 21 – The first television revue, named Looking In, is shown on the BBC. The first four minutes of this programme survive on a Silvatone record, an early method of home video recording.
- August 4 – W9XAT in Minneapolis, Minnesota makes its first transmission.
- RCA performs private field tests in Camden, New Jersey of an electronic television system.

== Ending this year ==
- The Television Ghost (1931–1933)

== Television shows ==
Series	Debut	Ended
The Television Ghost	1931	1933

== Births ==
- January 8 – Charles Osgood, journalist (died 2024)
- January 12 – Ron Harper, actor (died 2024)
- January 17 – Shari Lewis, puppeteer (died 1998)
- February 2 – Tony Jay, actor (died 2006)
- February 6 – Leslie Crowther, actor and host, Crackerjack (died 1996)
- March 12 – Barbara Feldon, actress, Get Smart
- March 13 – Gloria McMillan, actress, Our Miss Brooks (died 2022)
- March 19
  - Phyllis Newman, actress, game show panelist (died 2019)
  - Renée Taylor, actress, The Nanny
- April 5 – Frank Gorshin, comedian, actor, Batman (died 2005)
- April 7 – Wayne Rogers, actor, financial commentator, M*A*S*H (died 2015)
- April 26 – Carol Burnett, actress, comedian, The Carol Burnett Show
- May 3 – Alex Cord, actor, Airwolf (died 2021)
- May 7 – Roger Perry, actor, Arrest and Trial, Harrigan and Son (died 2018)
- May 20 – Constance Towers, actress, General Hospital
- May 21 – Richard Libertini, actor (died 2016)
- June 8 – Joan Rivers, comedian and host, The Joan Rivers Show, Fashion Police (died 2014)
- June 20 – Danny Aiello, actor (died 2019)
- June 21 – Bernie Kopell, actor, Get Smart, The Love Boat
- June 22 – Jacques Martin, presenter and producer (died 2007)
- June 27 – Gary Crosby, singer and actor (died 1995)
- July 8 – Michael Barrier, actor (died 2024)
- July 23 – Bert Convy, actor and game show host (died 1991)
- July 25 – Ken Swofford, actor (died 2018)
- July 26 – Kathryn Hays, actress, As the World Turns (died 2022)
- July 29 – Robert Fuller, actor, Laramie
- July 30 – Edd Byrnes, actor, 77 Sunset Strip (died 2020)
- August 1 – Dom DeLuise, actor and comedian (died 2009)
- August 11 – Jerry Falwell, televangelist (died 2007)
- August 16
  - Gary Clarke, actor, The Virginian
  - Julie Newmar, actress, Batman
- August 25 – Tom Skerritt, actor, Picket Fences (died 2026)
- September 13 – Eileen Fulton, actress, As the World Turns (died 2025)
- September 15 – Henry Darrow, Puerto Rican-American actor, The High Chaparral (died 2021)
- September 17 – Pat Crowley, actress, A Date With Judy, Please Don't Eat the Daisies (died 2025)
- September 18 – Robert Blake, actor, Baretta (died 2023)
- September 19 – David McCallum, Scottish-born actor, The Man from U.N.C.L.E., NCIS (died 2023)
- September 27
  - Greg Morris, actor, Mission: Impossible, Vega$ (died 1996)
  - Kathleen Nolan, actress, The Real McCoys
- September 30 – Barbara Knox, English actress, Coronation Street
- November 3
  - Ken Berry, actor, F Troop, Mama's Family (died 2018)
  - Michael Dukakis, American politician
- November 4 – Junko Ikeuchi, Japanese actress, Nemuri Kyōshirō: Burai-hikae (died 2010)
- November 5 – Herb Edelman, actor, The Good Guys, The Golden Girls (died 1996)
- November 19 – Larry King, talk show host (died 2021)
- November 26 – Robert Goulet, singer (died 2007)
- November 28 – Hope Lange, actress, The Ghost & Mrs. Muir (died 2003)
- December 3 – Les Crane, host (died 2003)
- December 8 – Flip Wilson, comedian and host, The Flip Wilson Show (died 1998)
- December 15
  - Tim Conway, actor, The Carol Burnett Show, McHale's Navy (died 2019)
  - William Link, producer (died 2020)
- December 22 – Elizabeth Hubbard, actress, The Doctors, As the World Turns (died 2023)
- December 26 – Caroll Spinney, puppeteer, Sesame Street (died 2019)
