= 1930 in television =

The year 1930 in television involved some significant events. Below is a list of television-related events during 1930.

== Global television events ==
Month	Day	Event
May	22	An audience at Proctor's Theatre in Schenectady, New York becomes the first to see a closed-circuit television signal projected onto a big screen.
July	14	For the first time in the United Kingdom, a television drama is broadcast. The drama is a production of Luigi Pirandello's The Man With the Flower in His Mouth; it is broadcast by the BBC from Baird's studios at 133 Long Acre, London.
November	5	Baird television transmissions at Hairdressing Fair of Fashion include the world's first television commercial for the Eugène Method of permanent hair waving.
December	7	W1XAV in Boston, Massachusetts broadcasts the first television commercial in the United States, of I.J Fox Furriers during The Fox Trappers.

== Births ==
- January 1 - Ty Hardin, U.S. actor (Bronco) (died 2017)
- January 3 - Robert Loggia, U.S. actor (died 2015)
- January 4 - Sorrell Booke, U.S. actor (The Dukes of Hazzard) (died 1994)
- January 6 - Vic Tayback, U.S. actor (Alice) (died 1990)
- January 15 - Edwin Sherin, U.S. director (died 2017)
- January 19 - Tippi Hedren, U.S. actress
- January 30 - Don Brockett, U.S. actor (died 1995)
- February 8 - Alejandro Rey, Argentinian-born actor (The Flying Nun) (died 1987)
- February 10 - Robert Wagner, U.S. actor (It Takes a Thief, Switch, Hart to Hart)
- February 27 - Joanne Woodward, U.S. actress
- March 22
  - Pat Robertson, televangelist (died 2023)
  - Stephen Sondheim, U.S. composer (died 2021)
- March 30 - John Astin, U.S. actor (The Addams Family)
- April 5 - Mary Costa, actress
- April 7 - Andrew Sachs, German-born British actor (Fawlty Towers) (died 2016)
- April 18 - Clive Revill, actor
- April 19 - Dick Sargent, U.S. actor (Bewitched) (died 1994)
- April 23 - Alan Oppenheimer, U.S. actor
- April 25 - Lynn Hamilton, U.S. actress (Sanford and Son)
- April 28 - Carolyn Jones, U.S. actress (The Addams Family) (died 1983)
- May 10 - Pat Summerall, American football player and sportscaster (died 2013)
- May 17 - Frank Price, U.S. TV and film executive
- May 20 - Betty DeGeneres, American LGBT rights activist
- May 31 - Clint Eastwood, U.S. director and actor (Rawhide)
- June 12 - Jim Nabors, U.S. actor, singer (The Andy Griffith Show, Gomer Pyle, U.S.M.C.) (died 2017)
- June 19 - Gena Rowlands, U.S. actress (died 2024)
- June 25 - George Murdock, actor (died 2012)
- June 27 - Ross Perot, American businessman and politician (died 2019)
- June 29 - Robert Evans, Actor (died 2019)
- July 14 - Polly Bergen, U.S. actress (died 2014)
- July 17 - Ray Galton, British writer (died 2018)
- July 28 - Horacio Gómez Bolaños, Mexican actor (died 1999)
- July 30 - Tony Lip, actor (died 2013)
- August 11 - Paul Soles, actor (died 2021)
- August 16
  - Frank Gifford, American football player and sportscaster (died 2015)
  - Robert Culp, U.S. actor (I Spy) (died 2010)
- August 25
  - Graham Jarvis, U.S. actor (died 2003)
  - Sean Connery, Actor (died 2020)
- August 28 -
  - Windsor Davies, British comedy actor (It Ain't Half Hot Mum) (died 2019)
  - Ben Gazzara, U.S. actor (Run for Your Life) (died 2012)
- September 7 - Sonny Rollins, Saxophonist
- September 11 - Cathryn Damon, U.S. actress (died 1987)
- September 16 - Anne Francis, U.S. actress (Honey West) (died 2011)
- September 23 - Ray Charles, U.S. singer, songwriter, pianist and composer (died 2004)
- September 27 - Bill Carruthers, U.S. television executive (died 2003)
- October 1 - Richard Harris, actor (died 2002)
- October 6 - Lou Cutell, U.S. actor (died 2021)
- October 19 - Fred Facey, U.S. radio and television announcer (died 2003)
- November 3
  - Larry Gelman, U.S. actor (The Bob Newhart Show)
  - Lois Smith, U.S. actress
- November 5 - Richard Davalos, U.S. actor (died 2016)
- November 15 - Whitman Mayo, U.S. actor (Sanford and Son) (died 2001)
- November 24 - Nina Russell, U.S. writer, actress (died 2019)
- November 2 - Peter Hall, English director (died 2017)
- December 4 - Ronnie Corbett, British comedian (died 2016)
- December 9 - Buck Henry, U.S. writer, actor, director (died 2020)
- December 12 - Bill Beutel, American television journalist (died 2006)
- December 17 - Armin Mueller-Stahl, actor
- December 21 - Phil Roman, U.S. animator
- December 24 - Julian Barry, U.S. screenwriter (died 2023)
- December 31 - Renate Hoy, U.S. actress (died 2024)

== Deaths ==
- February 19 - Alan Archibald Campbell-Swinton, Scottish electrical engineer who provided the theoretical basis for the electronic television, 66
