= 1934 in television =

The year 1934 in television involved some significant events. Below is a list of television-related events during 1934.

== Events ==
- March 31 - The agreement for joint experimental transmissions by the BBC and John Logie Baird's company ends.
- May 16 - The Seldon Committee is established to investigate the feasibility of a public television service in the UK.
- July 11 - In the U.S., the Communications Act of 1934 stipulates that commercial television stations "operate in the public interest, convenience, and necessity". The Federal Communications Commission (FCC) is charged with the responsibility of enforcing the act.
- August 25 - On August 25, the inventor Philo Farnsworth gave the world's first public demonstration of an all-electronic television system, using a live camera, at the Franklin Institute of Philadelphia. His demonstrations continued for ten days afterwards. Farnsworth's system included his version of an image dissector.
- November 5 - First television broadcasts in the USSR.
- Late 1934 - Vladimir K. Zworykin increases the number of scanning lines in electronic television from 240 lines at 24 frames per second to 343 lines at 30 frames.

== Births ==
- January 8 - Roy Kinnear, English comedy actor (died 1988)
- January 21 - Ann Wedgeworth, actress (Three's Company, Evening Shade) (died 2017)
- January 22 - Bill Bixby, television actor (My Favorite Martian, The Incredible Hulk) (died 1993)
- January 26 - Bob Uecker, sports commentator and actor died (2025)
- February 6 - Hugh Cornish, Australian television media executive and personality (died 2024)
- February 11 - Tina Louise, actress and singer (Gilligan's Island)
- February 12 - Bill Russell, NBA basketball player (died 2022)
- February 13 - George Segal, actor (Just Shoot Me!, The Goldbergs) (died 2021)
- February 14 - Florence Henderson, actress (The Brady Bunch) (died 2016)
- February 21 - Rue McClanahan, actress (The Golden Girls) (died 2010)
- February 27 - Van Williams, actor (Bourbon Street Beat, Surfside 6, The Green Hornet) (died 2016)
- March 1 - Joan Hackett, actress (died 1983)
- March 5 - James B. Sikking, actor (Hill Street Blues, Doogie Howser, M.D.) (died 2024)
- March 9 - Joyce Van Patten, actress
- March 26 - Alan Arkin, actor (died 2023)
- March 31
  - Richard Chamberlain, actor (Dr. Kildare) (died 2025)
  - Shirley Jones, singer and actress (The Partridge Family)
- April 1 - Don Hastings, actor (As the World Turns)
- April 5 - Frank Glieber, sportscaster (died 1985)
- April 18 - James Drury, actor (The Virginian) (died 2020)
- April 24 - Shirley MacLaine, actress and author
- May 10 - Gary Owens, American actor and radio broadcaster (announcer for Rowan & Martin's Laugh-In, voice of Space Ghost) (died 2015)
- May 18 - Dwayne Hickman, actor (The Bob Cummings Show, The Many Loves of Dobie Gillis) (died 2022)
- May 19 - Jim Lehrer, presidential debate moderator and host of the PBS NewsHour (died 2020)
- June 4 - Bill Moyers, journalist and television news host (died 2025)
- July 1 - Jamie Farr, American actor (M*A*S*H)
- July 10 - Jerry Nelson, American actor and puppeteer (Sesame Street, The Muppet Show) (died 2012)
- July 22 - Louise Fletcher, actress (died 2022)
- July 31 - Stan Daniels, producer (died 2007)
- August 5 - Gay Byrne, broadcaster, host of The Late Late Show (died 2019)
- August 7
  - Steve Ihnat, actor (died 1972)
  - Richard Levinson, producer (died 1987)
- August 9 - Cynthia Harris, actress (Mad About You) (died 2021)
- September 2 - Chuck McCann, actor and television host (died 2018)
- September 19 - Jay Randolph, sportscaster
- September 20 - Sophia Loren, actress
- September 27 - Wilford Brimley, American actor and commercial spokesperson (died 2020)
- October 17 - Kathleen Watkins, broadcaster
- October 18 - Chuck Swindoll, pastor
- November 13 - Garry Marshall, actor and director (Happy Days) (died 2016)
- December 7 - Audrey Maas, television writer and producer (DuPont Show of the Month, Eleanor and Franklin) (died 1975)
- December 9 - Judi Dench, English actress (As Time Goes By)
- December 28 - Maggie Smith, English actress (Downton Abbey) (died 2024)

== Sources ==
- Burns, R. W. (1998). Television: An International History of the Formative Years. IEE History of Technology Series. Vol. 22. London: Institution of Electrical Engineers. ISBN 0-85296-914-7.
