= 1940 in television =

The year 1940 in television involved some significant events. Below is a list of television-related events during 1940.

== Events ==
- January – The FCC has public hearings concerning television.
- January 12 - The first network telecast, a play entitled "Meet The Wife," is televised by NBC over W2XBS (NBC) and W2XB.
- February 25 – The first ice hockey game is televised in the United States, the New York Rangers vs Montreal Canadiens, from Madison Square Garden on W2XBS-TV.
- February 28 – The first basketball game is televised, from Madison Square Garden: Fordham University vs the University of Pittsburgh.
- March 10 – The Metropolitan Opera broadcast for the first time from NBC studios at Rockefeller Center an abridged performance of the first act of Pagliacci, along with excerpts from four other operas.
- March 15 – RCA reduces the price of television sets.
- May 21 – Bell Telephone Laboratories transmits a 441-line video signal, with a bandwidth of 2.7 MHz, by coaxial cable from New York to Philadelphia and back.
- June – W2XBS in New York (NBC) covers the Republican National Convention from Philadelphia, Pennsylvania for 33 hours, during a five-day period. The signal is transmitted via coaxial cable.
- August 1 – W2XBS goes out of commission from 1 August 1940 until the 27th of October 1940 while the transmitter is adjusted from 441-line picture to 525-line picture.
- August 29 – Peter Carl Goldmark of CBS announces his invention of a color television system.
- September 3 – CBS resumes its television transmissions with the first demonstration of high definition color TV, by W2XAB, transmitting from the Chrysler Building.
- November 5 - First televised Presidential election coverage is carried by W2XBS (NBC) and W2XWV (DuMont).

== Debuts ==
- February 3 - Art for Your Sake, an art discussion program hosted by Dr. Bernard Myers, debuts on W2XBS (NBC) (1940).
- February 21 - NBC News with Lowell Thomas, a simulcast of Lowell Thomas’ daily radio newscast, debuts on W2XBS (NBC) (1940).
- March 27- The Esso Television Reporter debuts on W2XBS (NBC) (1940).
- July 8 - Boxing from Jamaica Arena debuts on W2XBS (NBC) (1940-42).

== Television shows ==
Series	Debut	Ended	Network
Art for Your Sake	February 3, 1940	March 30, 1940	NBC
NBC News with Lowell Thomas	February 21, 1940	July 30, 1940	NBC
The Esso Television Reporter	March 27, 1940	May 31, 1940	NBC
Boxing from Jamaica Arena	July 8, 1940	May 18, 1942	NBC

== Programs ending during 1940 ==
Date	Series	Debut
May 31	The Esso Television Reporter	March 27, 1940
July 30	NBC News with Lowell Thomas	February 21, 1940

== Births ==
- January 5 – Michael O'Donoghue, writer (died 1994)
- January 14 – Trevor Nunn, British theatre director
- January 19 – Mike Reid, English actor and comedian (died 2007)
- January 22 – John Hurt, English actor (died 2017)
- January 27 – James Cromwell, actor
- January 29 – Katharine Ross, actress
- January 31 – Stuart Margolin, actor, The Rockford Files (died 2022)
- February 2 – David Jason, English actor, Only Fools and Horses
- February 3 – Jim Hartz, television personality (died 2022)
- February 6
  - Tom Brokaw, American journalist
  - Jimmy Tarbuck, English comedian
- February 8 – Ted Koppel, journalist
- February 10 – Kathryn Mullen, puppeteer
- February 12 – Ralph Bates, English actor (died 1991)
- February 17 – John Lewis, politician (died 2020)
- February 20 – Smokey Robinson, singer
- February 22
  - Don Cannon, American news anchor
  - Judy Cornwell, English actress
- February 23 – Peter Fonda, actor (died 2019)
- February 24 – James Sloyan, actor
- February 27 – Howard Hesseman, actor, WKRP in Cincinnati, Head of the Class (died 2022)
- February 29
  - Sonja Barend, talk show host
  - Margit Carstensen, actress (died 2023)
  - Yoshio Harada, actor (died 2011)
  - Harvey Jason, actor
  - Monte Kiffin, coach
- March 7 – Daniel J. Travanti, actor, Hill Street Blues
- March 10 – Chuck Norris, actor, Walker, Texas Ranger (died 2026)
- March 15 – Phil Lesh, musician
- March 26
  - James Caan, actor, Las Vegas (died 2022)
  - Nancy Pelosi, politician
- March 28 – Tony Barber, host
- April 2 – Penelope Keith, English actress, To The Manor Born (died 2026)
- April 12
  - John Hagee, pastor
  - Herbie Hancock, jazz pianist
- April 15 – Thea White, American voice actress (died 2021)
- April 17 – Chuck Menville, American television animator and writer (died 1992)
- April 25 – Al Pacino, actor
- April 30 – Burt Young, actor (died 2023)
- May 5 – Lance Henriksen, actor
- May 6 – Rick Husky, producer
- May 8
  - Emilio Delgado, actor (died 2022)
  - Ricky Nelson, actor (died 1985)
- May 9 – James L. Brooks, producer
- May 10 – Taurean Blacque, actor, Hill Street Blues (died 2022)
- May 15
  - Roger Ailes, American television executive (died 2017)
  - Lainie Kazan, American actress
- May 17 – Peter Gerety, actor
- May 22
  - Michael Sarrazin, actor (died 2011)
  - Bernard Shaw, journalist (died 2022)
- May 24 – Arvin Brown, American theatre and television director
- June 1 – René Auberjonois, actor, Star Trek: Deep Space Nine (died 2019)
- June 2 – Maree Cheatham, actress (Search for Tomorrow, General Hospital, Days of Our Lives)
- June 6 – Richard Paul, actor (died 1998)
- June 11 – Daniel J. Sullivan, film director
- June 14 – Jack Bannon, actor, Lou Grant (died 2017)
- June 20 – John Mahoney, English-born actor, Frasier (died 2018)
- June 21 – Mariette Hartley, actress
- June 22 – Esther Rantzen, English consumer affairs presenter and campaigner, That's Life! (died 2026)
- June 26 – Mel White, author
- July 3 – Michael Cole, actor, The Mod Squad
- July 6 – Jeannie Seely, singer
- July 7 – Ringo Starr, English rock drummer, The Beatles
- July 13 – Patrick Stewart, English-born actor, Star Trek: The Next Generation (died 2026)
- July 17
  - Tim Brooke-Taylor, English comedy performer, The Goodies (died 2020)
  - Verne Lundquist, American sportscaster
- July 18 – James Brolin, actor, Marcus Welby, M.D.
- July 22 – Alex Trebek, game show host, Jeopardy! (died 2020)
- July 23 – Don Imus, American radio/television host, Imus in the Morning (died 2019)
- July 24 – Dan Hedaya, American actor
- July 31 – Roy Walker, Northern Ireland-born television host
- August 3 – Martin Sheen, American actor, The West Wing
- August 19
  - Jill St. John, actress
  - Lou Wagner, actor
- August 22 – Judy Nugent, actress (died 2023)
- August 23 – Richard Sanders, actor, WKRP in Cincinnati
- August 26 – Don LaFontaine, voice actor (died 2008)
- August 28
  - Ken Jenkins, actor, Scrubs
  - Bonnie Turner, producer
- September 1 – Gary Bender, sportscaster
- September 5 – Raquel Welch, actress (died 2023)
- September 11 – Brian De Palma, screenwriter
- September 12 – Linda Gray, actress, Dallas
- September 21 – Bill Kurtis, news anchor
- October 4 – Christopher Stone, actor (The Interns) (died 1995)
- October 9 – John Lennon, English singer-songwriter, The Beatles (killed 1980)
- October 16 – Barry Corbin, American actor
- October 19 – Michael Gambon, Irish-born British actor, The Singing Detective (died 2023)
- October 28 – Susan Harris, writer
- November 9 – Reynaldo Villalobos, director
- November 13 – Daniel Pilon, Cuban-born actor, Dallas (died 2018)
- November 15 – Sam Waterston, actor, Law & Order
- November 20 – Tony Butala, singer
- November 21 – Freddy Beras-Goico, TV host
- November 22 – Terry Gilliam, actor
- November 27 – Bruce Lee, actor (died 1973)
- December 2 – Connie Booth, actress, Fawlty Towers
- December 7 – Carole Simpson, broadcast journalist
- December 11 – Donna Mills, actress, Knots Landing
- December 12 – Dionne Warwick, singer
- December 21
  - Arvi Lind, Finnish newsreader
  - Don Phillips, American casting director (died 2021)
- December 30 – James Burrows, director
