= 1927 in television =

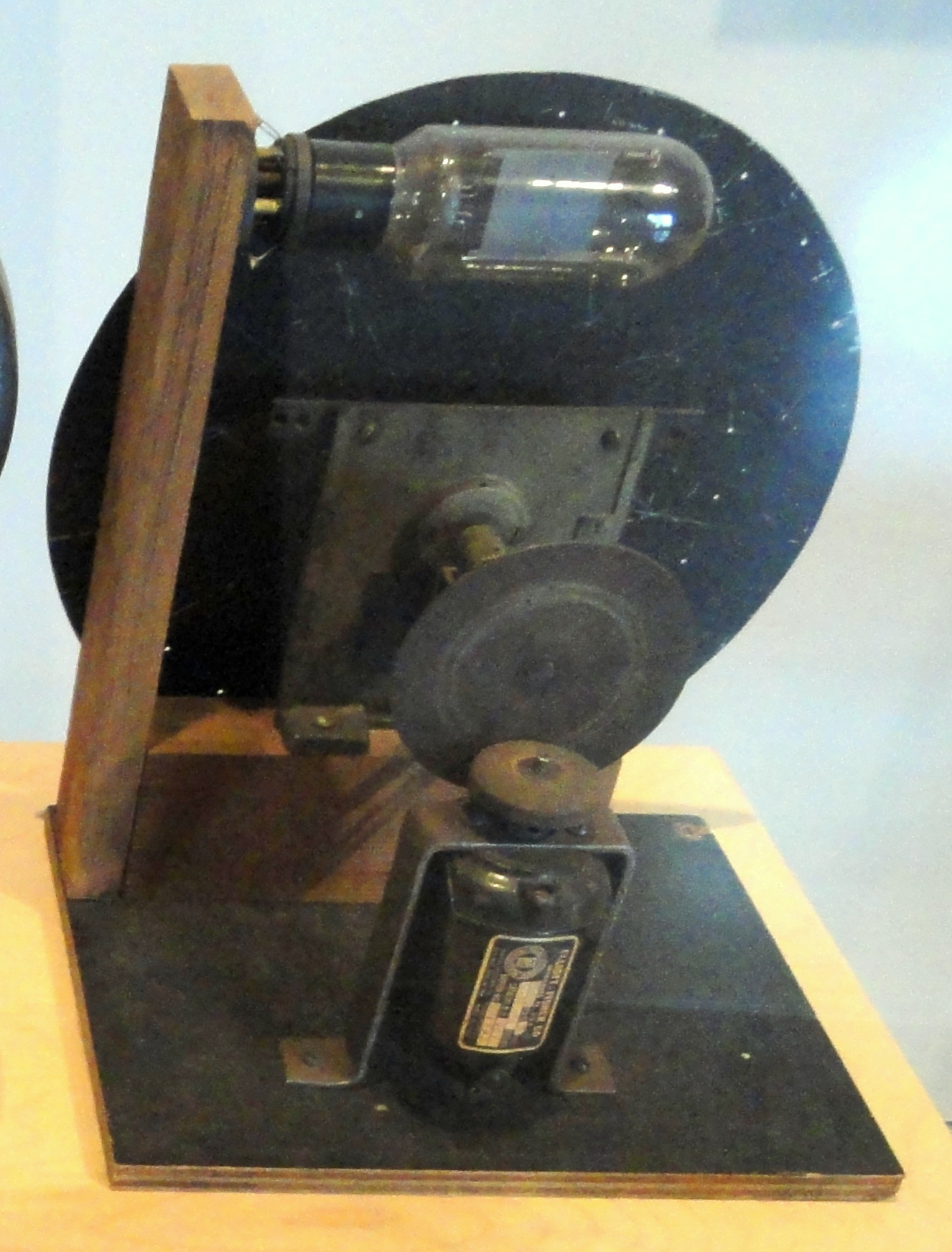

The year 1927 involved some significant events in television. Below is a list of television-related events during 1927.

== Global television events ==
Month	Day	Event
January	07	Philo Farnsworth applies for an image dissector tube patent, which used caesium to produce images electronically.
April	07	Bell Telephone Company transmits a speech by U.S. Secretary of Commerce Herbert Hoover 320 kilometers over telephone lines, which becomes the first successful long distance demonstration of television. Experimental station 3XN in Whippany, New Jersey is used to transmit 1,575 kHz video and 1,450 kHz radio. The system uses a flying-spot scanner, and is seen on Nipkow disc receivers with two-inch, 50-line images, and on a two-foot neon tube display. It was developed by Herbert E. Ives and Frank Gray. Edna Mae Horner, an operator at the Chesapeake and Potomac Telephone Company, assisted the transmission and became the first woman on television; she helped guests in Washington, D.C., exchange greetings with the audience in New York. Throughout the presentation, viewers in New York could see and hear Edna.
May	23	The first demonstration of television before a large audience. Nearly 600 members of the American Institute of Electrical Engineers and the Institute of Radio Engineers view the demonstration at the Bell Telephone Building in New York City.
May	24	John Logie Baird transmits a television signal from London to Glasgow by telephone line.
September	07	Philo Farnsworth achieves an experimental electronic television image, of a straight line, at his laboratory at 202 Green Street in San Francisco.
September	20	John Logie Baird demonstrates the first ever system for recording television. His Phonovision VideoDisc apparatus records 30-line television pictures and sound on conventional 78 rpm gramophone records.

== Births ==
Date	Name	Notability
January 3	William Boyett	U.S. actor (Adam-12) (died 2004)
January 17	Eartha Kitt	U.S. actress and singer (died 2008)
January 19	Nancy Dickerson Whitehead	U.S. radio and television journalist (died 1997)
January 27	Jerry Haynes	U.S. actor ("Mr Peppermint") (died 2011)
February 15	Carlos Romero	U.S. actor (died 2007)
February 15	Harvey Korman	U.S. actor and comedian (The Carol Burnett Show) (died 2008)
February 16	June Brown	English actress (EastEnders) (died 2022)
March 5	Jack Cassidy	U.S. actor (died 1976)
March 31	William Daniels	U.S. actor (Knight Rider, St. Elsewhere, Boy Meets World)
April 1	Peter Cundall	Australian horticulturist and presenter (Gardening Australia) (died 2021)
May 4	Terry Scott	English actor and comedian (died 1994)
May 5	Pat Carroll	U.S. actress (died 2022)
May 11	Bernard Fox	Welsh-U.S. actor (Hogan's Heroes, Bewitched) (died 2016)
May 17	Marilyn Hall	Canadian-born American television producer (died 2017)
May 22	Michael Constantine	U.S. actor (Room 222) (died 2021)
May 30	Clint Walker	U.S. actor and singer (Cheyenne) (died 2018)
June 4	Geoffrey Palmer	English actor (As Time Goes By) (died 2020)
June 7	Mária Kráľovičová	Slovak actress (Do videnia, Lucienne!) (died 2022)
June 8	Jerry Stiller	U.S. comedian and actor (Stiller and Meara, Seinfeld) (died 2020)
June 27	Cino Tortorella	Italian presenter (Zecchino d'Oro) (died 2017)
July 4	Neil Simon	U.S. writer, playwright, and author (Your Show of Shows, The Phil Silvers Show, The Odd Couple) (died 2018)
July 7	Doc Severinsen	U.S. bandleader (The Tonight Show)
August 18	Rosalynn Carter	39th First Lady of the United States (died 2023)
August 30	Bill Daily	U.S. actor and comedian (I Dream of Jeannie, The Bob Newhart Show) (died 2018)
September 16	Peter Falk	U.S. actor (Columbo) (died 2011)
September 29	Cid Moreira	Brazilian journalist and presenter (died 2024)
October 1	Tom Bosley	U.S. actor (Happy Days, Murder, She Wrote) (died 2010)
October 14	Roger Moore	English actor (The Saint) (died 2017)
October 16	Eileen Ryan	Actress (died 2022)
November 3	Peggy McCay	U.S. actress (Days of Our Lives) (died 2018)
November 20	Estelle Parsons	U.S. actress (Roseanne)
November 28	Chuck Mitchell	U.S. actor (died 1992)
November 29	Vin Scully	U.S. sportscaster (died 2022)
November 30	Robert Guillaume	U.S. actor (Soap, Benson, Sports Night) (died 2017)
