= 1926 in television =

The year 1926 in television involved some significant events. Below is a list of television-related events during 1926.

== Global television events ==
Month	Day	Event
January	26	John Logie Baird demonstrates the world's first television system to transmit live, moving images with tone graduations, to 40 members of the Royal Institution. The 30-line images are scanned mechanically by a disk with a spiral of lenses at 12.5 images per second.
August	18	A weather map is televised for the first time, sent from NAA Arlington to the National Oceanic and Atmospheric Administration in Washington, D.C.
December	25	Japanese researcher Kenjiro Takayanagi demonstrates a system that uses a mechanical Nipkow disk and a photoelectric tube in the transmitting device, and a cathode-ray tube in the receiving device. He transmits the 40-line still image of a Japanese character.

== Births ==
Date	Name	Notability
January 8	Soupy Sales	U.S. comedian and actor (died 2009)
February 6	Bob Trow	U.S. actor (died 1998)
February 20	Whitney Blake	U.S. actress (Hazel) (died 2002)
March 1	Robert Clary	French-U.S. actor (Hogan's Heroes) (died 2022)
March 16	Jerry Lewis	U.S. comedian and actor (died 2017)
March 30	Peter Marshall	Game show host (died 2024)
April 18	Harold Hayes	U.S. broadcaster (died 1989)
April 22	Charlotte Rae	U.S. actress (The Facts of Life) (died 2018)
April 30	Cloris Leachman	U.S. actress (The Mary Tyler Moore Show, Phyllis, Raising Hope) (died 2021)
May 5	Ann B. Davis	U.S. actress (The Brady Bunch) (died 2014)
May 8	Sir David Attenborough	British naturalist, documentary-maker and television executive
May 8	Don Rickles	U.S. comedian and actor (died 2017)
May 25	Claude Akins	Actor (died 1994)
May 26	Regis Cordic	Actor (died 1999)
May 29	Katie Boyle	Italian-born British television personality (Eurovision Song Contest) (died 2018)
June 1	Andy Griffith	U.S. actor, producer (The Andy Griffith Show) (died 2012)
June 10	Joe Negri	U.S. Jazz guitarist (died 2026)
June 28	Mel Brooks	U.S. comedy writer, actor, director, producer (Get Smart)
July 10	Fred Gwynne	U.S. actor (Car 54, Where Are You?, The Munsters) (died 1993)
October 11	Earle Hyman	U.S. actor (The Cosby Show, ThunderCats) (died 2017)
October 17	Julie Adams	U.S. actress (Murder, She Wrote) (died 2019)
November 9	Johnny Beattie	Scottish actor (died 2020)
November 13	Jim Jensen	U.S. anchor (died 1999)
November 25	Jeffrey Hunter	U.S. actor (Temple Houston, Star Trek) (died 1969)
November 30	Richard Crenna	U.S. actor (died 2003)
December 1	Keith Michell	actor (died 2015)
December 17	Patrice Wymore	U.S. actress (died 2014)
December 19	Herb Stempel	U.S. television game show contestant (died 2020)
