= 1943 in television =

The year 1943 in television involved some significant events. Below is a list of television-related events during 1943.

== Events ==
- May 8 – Opening of Paris Télévision – Fernsehsender Paris, a channel operated by German occupation authorities (Kurt Hinzmann, former director of Fernsehsender "Paul Nipkow") after an agreement between Telefunken and Compagnie des Compteurs, with a (German) 441-line standard. Local French programmes and Fernsehsender "Paul Nipkow" programmes are interlaced.
- June – Work is begun for the U.S. Army Air Forces to develop a remotely controlled glide bomb guided by a radio receiver and a television transmitter using a 625-line iconoscope tube. The first are completed in July and tested in August.
- December 23 – The first complete opera, Hansel and Gretel, is telecast, by WRGB in Schenectady.
- The American Broadcasting Company (ABC) is formed. Its television network debuts in 1948.
- Germany experiments with a flying bomb guided by a television camera, created by Fernseh, using both the Superikonoscope and the Farnsworth image dissector.

== Debuts ==
- The Voice of Firestone Televues (1943–1947; renamed The Voice of Firestone, broadcast from 1949 to 1963).
- April 18 - Your Victory Garden debuts on W2XVW (Dumont) (1943)

== Television shows ==
Series	Debut	Ended	Network
Your Victory Garden	April 18, 1943	May 9, 1943	Dumont
The Voice of Firestone Televues	1943	1947	NBC

== Births ==
- January 1
  - Don Novello, actor (Saturday Night Live)
  - Stanley Kamel, actor (d. 2008)
- January 13 – Richard Moll, actor (Night Court, Batman: The Animated Series, Mighty Max) (d. 2023)
- January 14 - Holland Taylor, actress (The Practice, Two and a Half Men)
- January 18 - Paul Angelis, actor (d. 2009)
- January 23 – Gil Gerard, actor (Buck Rogers in the 25th Century)
- January 24 – Sharon Tate, actress, model (d. 1969)
- January 26 - Kathryn Leigh Scott, actress (Dark Shadows)
- January 28 – John Beck, actor (Flamingo Road)
- January 31 - Peter McRobbie, actor (Law & Order, Daredevil)
- February 1 - Tina Sloan, actress (Guiding Light)
- February 3 - Blythe Danner, actress (Huff)
- February 5 - Michael Mann, producer
- February 8 - Creed Bratton, actor (The Office)
- February 17 – Claire Malis, actress (d. 2012)
- February 25 - George Harrison, English singer-songwriter, The Beatles (d. 2001)
- February 27 – Mary Frann, actress (Newhart) (d. 1998)
- March 8
  - Susan Clark, Canadian actress (Webster)
  - Lynn Redgrave, actress (d. 2010)
- March 9 - Charles Gibson, American broadcast television anchor
- March 16 – Susan Bay, actress
- March 18 – Kevin Dobson, actor (Kojak) (d. 2020)
- March 23 - Alan Kalter, announcer (d. 2021)
- March 25 - Paul Michael Glaser, actor and director (Starsky & Hutch)
- March 28 - Conchata Ferrell, actress (Two and a Half Men) (d. 2020)
- March 29 – Eric Idle, actor and comedian (Monty Python's Flying Circus)
- March 31 - Christopher Walken, actor
- April 2 - Antonio Sabàto Sr., actor (d. 2021)
- April 5 - Max Gail, actor (Barney Miller)
- April 11 - Harley Race, professional wrestler (d. 2019)
- April 23 - Hervé Villechaize, actor (d. 1993)
- April 24 - Richard Sterban, singer
- April 25 - Tony Christie, singer
- April 26 - Gary Wright, singer (d. 2023)
- April 29 - Duane Allen, singer
- April 30 - Bobby Vee, singer (d. 2016)
- May 10 - David Clennon, actor (thirtysomething)
- May 12 - Linda Dano, actress (One Life to Live, Another World)
- May 18 – Jimmy Snuka, pro wrestler (d. 2017)
- May 24 – Gary Burghoff, actor (M*A*S*H)
- May 27
  - Bruce Weitz, actor (Hill Street Blues)
  - Diane Pershing, actress (Batman: The Animated Series, She-Ra: Princess of Power)
- May 28 – Rod Holcomb, producer (d. 2024)
- May 30 – Charles Collingwood, actor
- May 31
  - Joe Namath, football player
  - Sharon Gless, actress (Cagney & Lacey)
- June 1 - John Langley, creator of Cops (d. 2021)
- June 2 - Charles Haid, actor and director (Hill Street Blues)
- June 3 - Camilla Sparv, actress
- June 7
  - "Superstar" Billy Graham, professional wrestler (d. 2023)
  - Ken Osmond, American actor and police officer (Leave It to Beaver) (d. 2020)
  - Michael Pennington, English actor and director
- June 13 – Malcolm McDowell, English actor (Mozart in the Jungle, Franklin & Bash, Metalocalypse, Superman: The Animated Series)
- June 15 – Lee Shallat Chemel, producer
- June 16 – Joan Van Ark, actress (Knots Landing)
- June 17 – Newt Gingrich, politician
- June 22 – Brit Hume, journalist
- June 24 – Georg Stanford Brown, Cuban-American actor (The Rookies)
- June 26 – John Beasley, actor (Everwood) (d. 2023)
- July 2 – Lauri Peters, actress
- July 3 – Kurtwood Smith, actor (That '70s Show, Regular Show, The Zeta Project)
- July 4 – Geraldo Rivera, television host
- July 8 – Ri Chun-hee, North Korean news presenter
- July 9 – Suzanne Rogers, actress (Days of Our Lives)
- July 11 – Susan Seaforth Hayes, actress (Days of Our Lives, The Young and the Restless)
- July 12 – Ernie Anastos, news anchor
- July 23
  - Lucy Lee Flippin, actress (Little House on the Prairie)
  - Bob Hilton, game show host
- July 28 – Bill Bradley, basketball player and politician
- July 29 – Roz Kelly, actress (Happy Days)
- August 2 – Max Wright, actor (ALF) (d. 2019)
- August 6 – Michael Anderson Jr., actor
- August 12 - Jim Storm, actor (Dark Shadows)
- August 13 - Lillian Hurst, actress (Lost)
- August 17 - Robert De Niro, actor
- August 18 - Martin Mull, actor (Roseanne, Sabrina the Teenage Witch, Danny Phantom) (d. 2024)
- August 27 - Tuesday Weld, actress (The Many Loves of Dobie Gillis)
- August 28 - David Soul, American-British actor and singer (Starsky & Hutch) (d. 2024)
- August 30 - Altovise Davis, American actress (d. 2009)
- September 9 - Art LaFleur, American actor (d. 2021)
- September 21 - Jerry Bruckheimer, American film and television producer
- September 25
  - Lee Aaker, actor (The Adventures of Rin Tin Tin) (d. 2021)
  - Josh Taylor, actor (Days of Our Lives, The Hogan Family)
  - Robert Walden, actor (Lou Grant, Brothers, Happily Divorced)
- September 27 - Peter Simon, actor (Guiding Light)
- October 6 - Michael Durrell, actor (Guiding Light)
- October 8
  - Chevy Chase, actor and comedian (Saturday Night Live, Community)
  - R. L. Stine, television producer
- October 12 - Lin Shaye, actress
- October 13 - Mike Barnicle, anchor
- October 15
  - Noreen Corcoran, actress (d. 2016)
  - Penny Marshall, actress and director (Laverne and Shirley) (d. 2018)
- October 17 – Elaine Taylor, actress
- October 27 – Carmen Argenziano, actor (Stargate SG-1) (d. 2019)
- October 29 – Don Simpson, film producer (d. 1996)
- November 4 – Chuck Scarborough, television journalist
- November 6 – Ian Turpie, actor (d. 2012)
- November 12 – Wallace Shawn, actor
- November 17 – Lauren Hutton, actress
- November 20 – Veronica Hamel, actress (Hill Street Blues)
- November 26 – Bruce Paltrow, television and film director (d. 2002)
- November 28 – Randy Newman, singer
- December 1 – David Salzman, producer
- December 11 – John Kerry, politician
- December 12 – E. Jean Carroll, author
- December 16 – Steven Bochco, writer-producer (Hill Street Blues) (d. 2018)
- December 23 – Harry Shearer, actor (Saturday Night Live, The Simpsons)
- December 27 – Cokie Roberts, political journalist (d. 2019)
- December 28 – Richard Whiteley, presenter (d. 2005)
- December 31 – Ben Kingsley, actor

== Deaths ==
- January 7 - Nikola Tesla, inventor of the Tesla coil (born 1856)
