= 1937 in television =

The year 1937 in television involved some noteworthy events. Below is a list of television-related events during 1937.

== Events ==
- January 19 – BBC Television broadcasts The Underground Murder Mystery by J. Bissell Thomas from its London station, the first play written for television.
- February 6 – The BBC Television service discontinues the Baird system in favour of the Marconi-EMI 405 lines system.
- March 9 – Experimental broadcasting from Shabolovka Ulitsa television center, in Moscow (USSR).
- May – Gilbert Seldes becomes the first television critic, with his Atlantic Monthly magazine article, the "Errors of Television".
- May 12 – The BBC use their outside broadcast unit for the first time, to televise the coronation of George VI. A fragment of this broadcast is one of the earliest surviving examples of British television – filmed off-screen at home by an engineer with an 8 mm cine camera. A brief section of this footage is used in a programme during the week of the 1953 coronation of Elizabeth II, and this latter programme survives in the BBC's archives.
- May 14 – The BBC broadcasts a thirty-minute excerpt of Twelfth Night, the first known instance of a Shakespeare play televised. Among the cast are Peggy Ashcroft and Greer Garson.
- May 15 – RCA demonstrates projection television, with images enlarged to 8 by 10 feet, at the Institute of Radio Engineers convention.
- June 21 – Wimbledon Championships (tennis) first televised by the BBC.
- July 10 – High-definition television with 455 lines is first shown in France at the International Exposition, Paris.
- September – High-definition television broadcasts are sent from a new 30 kW (peak power) transmitter below the Eiffel Tower in Paris.
- November 9 – Bell Telephone Laboratories transmits television signal of 800 kHz bandwidth on a coaxial cable laid between New York and Philadelphia.
- November 11 (Armistice Day) – BBC Television devotes the evening to a broadcast of Journey's End by R. C. Sherriff (1928, set on the Western Front (World War I) in 1918), the first full-length television adaptation of a stage play. Reginald Tate plays the lead, Stanhope, a rôle he has performed extensively in the theatre.
- November 27 – NBC in the United States broadcasts the first of six live teleplays of The Three Garridebs (based closely on Arthur Conan Doyle's story "The Adventure of the Three Garridebs"), the first known television pilot, in which Louis Hector becomes the first actor to play Sherlock Holmes on television.
- December 31 – By this time, 2,121 television sets have been sold in England.
- CBS announces their efforts to develop television broadcasts.

== Debuts ==
- April 17 – The Disorderly Room (UK) premieres on the BBC Television Service (1937-1939).
- April 24 – For The Children (UK), the BBC's first programme for children, debuts (1937–1939; 1946–1950).
- April 30 – Sports Review (UK), the first regular sports programme, debuts on the BBC (1937–1939).

== Television shows ==
Series	Debut	Ended
Picture Page (UK)	October 8, 1936	1939
Picture Page (UK)	1946	1952
Starlight (UK)	November 3, 1936	1939
Starlight (UK)	1946	1949
Theatre Parade (UK)	1936	1938
The Disorderly Room (UK)	April 17, 1937	August 20, 1939
For The Children (UK)	April 24, 1937	1939
For The Children (UK)	July 7, 1946	1950
Sports Review (UK)	April 30, 1937	1939

== Births ==
- January 1 - Matt Robinson, American actor and screenwriter, Sesame Street (d. 2002)
- January 3 - Glen A. Larson, American musician and screenwriter, (d. 2014)
- January 11 - Felix Silla, Italian-born actor, The Addams Family (d. 2021)
- January 25 - Gregory Sierra, actor, Sanford and Son, Barney Miller (d. 2021)
- February 1 – Garrett Morris, actor and comedian, Saturday Night Live
- February 2 - Tom Smothers, comedian, The Smothers Brothers Comedy Hour (d. 2023)
- February 25 - Bob Schieffer, American television journalist
- February 27 - Barbara Babcock, actress, Hill Street Blues
- March 3 - Bobby Driscoll, actor (died 1968)
- March 6 - Norman Coburn, actor
- March 10 - Joe Viterelli, actor (died 2004)
- March 22 - Angelo Badalamenti, composer (died 2022)
- March 23 - Tony Burton, actor (died 2016)
- March 30 - Warren Beatty, actor
- April 1 - Jordan Charney, actor
- April 6 - Billy Dee Williams, actor
- April 11 - Jill Gascoine, actress (d. 2020)
- April 13 - Stan Stasiak, professional wrestler (d. 1997)
- April 14 - Paul Kangas, anchor (d. 2019)
- April 15 - Frank Vincent, actor (d. 2017)
- April 19 - Elinor Donahue, actress, Father Knows Best
- April 20 - George Takei, actor, Star Trek
- April 22 – Jack Nicholson, actor
- May 2 - Lorenzo Music, voice actor, Garfield and Friends (d. 2001)
- May 12 - George Carlin, actor (d. 2008)
- May 13 - Beverly Owen, actress, The Munsters (d. 2019)
- May 16 - Yvonne Craig, actress (d. 2015)
- May 28 - Freddie Roman, comedian (d. 2022)
- May 30 - Deanna Lund, actress, Land of the Giants (d. 2018)
- June 1 – Morgan Freeman, actor, The Electric Company
- June 2 – Sally Kellerman, actress (d. 2022)
- June 3 – Edward Winter, American actor and director (d. 2001)
- June 4 – Gorilla Monsoon, WWF wrestler and commentator (d. 1999)
- June 10 – Luciana Paluzzi, actress
- June 11 – Chad Everett, actor, Medical Center (d. 2012)
- June 19 – Pamela Lincoln, actor (d. 2019)
- July 2 - Polly Holliday, actress, Alice, Flo
- July 5 - Brooke Hayward, actress
- July 6 - Ned Beatty, actor (died 2021)
- July 7 - Carol Nugent, actress
- July 12 – Bill Cosby, actor and comedian, Fat Albert and the Cosby Kids, The Cosby Show
- July 19 – Richard Jordan, American actor (d. 1993)
- July 27 – Don Galloway, American actor (d. 2009)
- July 28 – Walter Jacobson, news personality
- August 2 – Billy Cannon, football player (d. 2018)
- August 3 – Steven Berkoff, actor
- August 7 – Barbara Windsor, actress (d. 2020)
- August 8 – Dustin Hoffman, actor
- September 6
  - Jo Anne Worley, actress
  - Sergio Aragonés, cartoonist
- September 7 – John Phillip Law, actor (d. 2008)
- September 13 – Fred Silverman, producer (d. 2020)
- September 14 – Carol Christensen, actress (d. 2005)
- September 26 – Jerry Weintraub, voice actor (d. 2015)
- September 28 – Rod Roddy, voice actor (d. 2003)
- October 2 - Johnnie Cochran, lawyer (d. 2005)
- October 5 - Linda Lavin, actress, Alice
- October 11 - Ron Leibman, actor, Archer (d. 2019)
- October 16 - Tony Anthony, actor
- October 21 - Irán Eory, Iranian-Mexican actress (d. 2002)
- November 4 - Loretta Swit, actress, M*A*S*H (d. 2025)
- November 10 - Albert Hall, actor
- November 21
  - Ingrid Pitt, actress (d. 2010)
  - Marlo Thomas, actress, That Girl
- November 30 - Ridley Scott, director
- December 4
  - Max Baer Jr., actor, The Beverly Hillbillies
  - Donnelly Rhodes, Canadian actor, Soap (d. 2018)
- December 7 – Larry Hankin, actor
- December 21 – Jane Fonda, actress
- December 29 – Barbara Steele, actress
- December 31 - Anthony Hopkins, Welsh actor, Westworld
