= 1938 in television =

The year 1938 in television involved some significant events. Below is a list of television-related events during 1938.

== Events ==
- February 11 – BBC Television in England broadcasts the first ever television science-fiction, a 35-minute adaptation of a segment of the play R.U.R. by the Czech playwright Karel Čapek.
- March 12 – First news bulletin aired by BBC television, in sound only. Previously, the service has broadcast British Movietone News cinema newsreels.
- April 1 – The Oxford and Cambridge Boat Race is first televised by the BBC.
- April 19 – The first televised association football match, England vs. Scotland, shown by the BBC.
- April 30 – The FA Cup Final is televised for the first time by the BBC.
- May 12 – W2XBS telecasts the 1937 film Return of the Scarlet Pimpernel. The staff projectionist accidentally plays the last reel out of order, ending the film 20 minutes early. NBC is unable to obtain the rights to first run movies for many years to follow.
- May 14 – The first quiz show, Spelling Bee, is televised by the BBC.
- May – Communicating Systems, Inc. of New York introduces the first electronic television sets available to the general public in the U.S. Model with 3-inch (76 mm) tube is $125–$150, 5-inch tube is $195–$250. Image only; sound apparatus is $15 more. Sets become available in department stores in June.
- June – DuMont, an electronics company, introduces television sets in the US, receiving both pictures and sound. $650 for a 10 by 8-in. screen, $395 for 8¼ by 6½ in.
- June 7 – An excerpt from Susan and God is the first Broadway play with its original cast to be broadcast on television. Station W2XBS uses exact replicas of the stage sets, with Nancy Coleman, Gertrude Lawrence and Paul McGrath appearing on the broadcast.
- June 24 – Test Match Cricket is broadcast for the first time by the BBC, with coverage of the second test of The Ashes series between England and the Australian team, live from Lord's Cricket Ground.
- September 29 – License for W9XAT Minneapolis, Minnesota, granted in 1929, expires. Television does not resume in the area for a decade.
- October 26 – The first televised ice hockey match, Harringay Racers vs. Streatham Redskins, shown by the BBC.
- November – Due to freak atmospheric conditions, a BBC TV broadcast from London is received in New York City. A film camera was used to record the silent images which included the performance of a play, a cartoon, and other matter. A four-minute excerpt from this filmed recording survives and is, as of 2014, considered the only surviving example of a pre-war BBC television transmission.
- November 12
  - NBC's W2XBS broadcasts what is the first telecast of an unscheduled event, a fire on Wards Island near Manhattan.
  - John Logie Baird gives the world's first public demonstration of a colour television broadcast (previous demonstrations of colour television in the UK and US have been via closed circuit). The 120-line image is projected at the Dominion Theatre, London on a 12 by 9 feet (3.7 by 2.7 m) screen in front of an audience of 3,000 people.
- December 12 – Start of daily television broadcasting in Moscow (USSR).
- December 31 – 9,315 television sets are sold in England.

== Television shows ==
Series	Debut	Ended
Picture Page (UK)	October 8, 1936	1939
Picture Page (UK)	1946	1952
Starlight (UK)	November 3, 1936	1939
Starlight (UK)	1946	1949
Theatre Parade (UK)	1936	1938
The Disorderly Room (UK)	April 17, 1937	August 20, 1939
For The Children (UK)	April 24, 1937	1939
For The Children (UK)	July 7, 1946	1950
Sports Review (UK)	April 30, 1937	1939
Telecrime (UK)	August 10, 1938	July 25, 1939
Telecrime (UK)	October 22, 1946	November 25, 1946

== Debuts ==
- August 10 – Telecrime (UK), the first television crime series, debuts on the BBC (1938–1939; 1946).
- December 31 – the first television adaption of Romeo and Juliet is broadcast

== Programs ending during 1938 ==
Date	Show	Debut
Unknown	Theatre Parade (UK)	1936

== Births ==
- January 2 – Ronny Hallin, actress
- January 8 – Bob Eubanks, game show host
- January 13 – Billy Gray, actor (Father Knows Best)
- January 14 – Bill Plante, veteran journalist (died 2022)
- February 1 – Sherman Hemsley, actor (The Jeffersons) (died 2012)
- February 20 – Richard Beymer, actor (Twin Peaks)
- February 23 – Sylvia Chase, American broadcast journalist (died 2019)
- February 24 – James Farentino, American actor (died 2012)
- March 1 – Aart Staartjes, Dutch actor and television presenter (died 2020)
- March 9 – Charles Siebert, actor and director Trapper John, M.D. (died 2022)
- March 31 – Joel Godard, American television announcer and voiceover artist
- April 6
  - Paul Daniels, English magician (died 2016)
  - Roy Thinnes, American actor (The Invaders)
- April 20 – Tamási Eszter, Hungarian television announcer and actress (died 1991)
- April 28 – Madge Sinclair, actress (died 1995)
- May 11 – Judy Farrell, American actress (died 2023)
- May 13
  - Anna Cropper, English actress (died 2007)
  - Buck Taylor, American actor
- May 24 – Tommy Chong, American-Canadian actor and comedian (That '70s Show)
- June 2 – Ron Ely, actor (Tarzan)
- June 5 – Howard Platt, actor (Sanford and Son)
- June 20 – John Johnson, reporter
- June 24 – Charles Howerton, actor
- June 27 – Ene Riisna, Estonian-American television producer
- June 30 – Jeri Taylor, American television producer
- July 9 – Brian Dennehy, actor (died 2020)
- July 20 – Diana Rigg, English actress, The Avengers (died 2020)
- July 28 – Robert Hughes, critic (died 2012)
- July 29 – Peter Jennings, journalist (died 2005)
- July 30 – Michael Bell, actor (G.I. Joe: A Real American Hero, Rugrats, Darkwing Duck)
- August 6 – Peter Bonerz, actor and director (The Bob Newhart Show)
- August 8 – Connie Stevens, actress (Hawaiian Eye)
- August 19 – Diana Muldaur, actress (L.A. Law, Star Trek: The Next Generation)
- August 28 – Marla Adams, actress (The Secret Storm, The Young and the Restless) (died 2024)
- August 29 – Elliott Gould, actor
- September 1 – Alan Dershowitz, lawyer
- September 2 – Mary Jo Catlett, actress (Diff'rent Strokes, SpongeBob SquarePants)
- September 11 – Don Quine, actor
- September 12
  - Michael Leader, English actor (EastEnders) (died 2016)
  - Patrick Mower, English actor (Emmerdale)
  - Anne Helm, actress
- September 17 – Paul Benedict, actor (The Jeffersons) (died 2008)
- October 1 – Stella Stevens, actress (died 2023)
- October 8 – Sonny Barger, actor (died 2022)
- October 18
  - Marilyn Miglin, American entrepreneur (died 2022)
  - Dawn Wells, actress (Gilligan's Island) (died 2020)
- October 22 – Christopher Lloyd, actor (Taxi, Cyberchase, Over the Garden Wall)
- October 27 – Lara Parker, actress (Dark Shadows) (died 2023)
- November 19 – Ted Turner, network executive (died 2026)
- November 24 – David Newell, actor
- December 6 – Patrick Bauchau, actor (The Pretender, House, M.D.)
- December 14 – Hal Williams, actor (Sanford and Son, 227) (died 2026)
- December 18 – Roger E. Mosley, actor (Magnum, P.I.) (died 2022)
- December 29 – Jon Voight, actor (Ray Donovan)
