= 1939 in television =

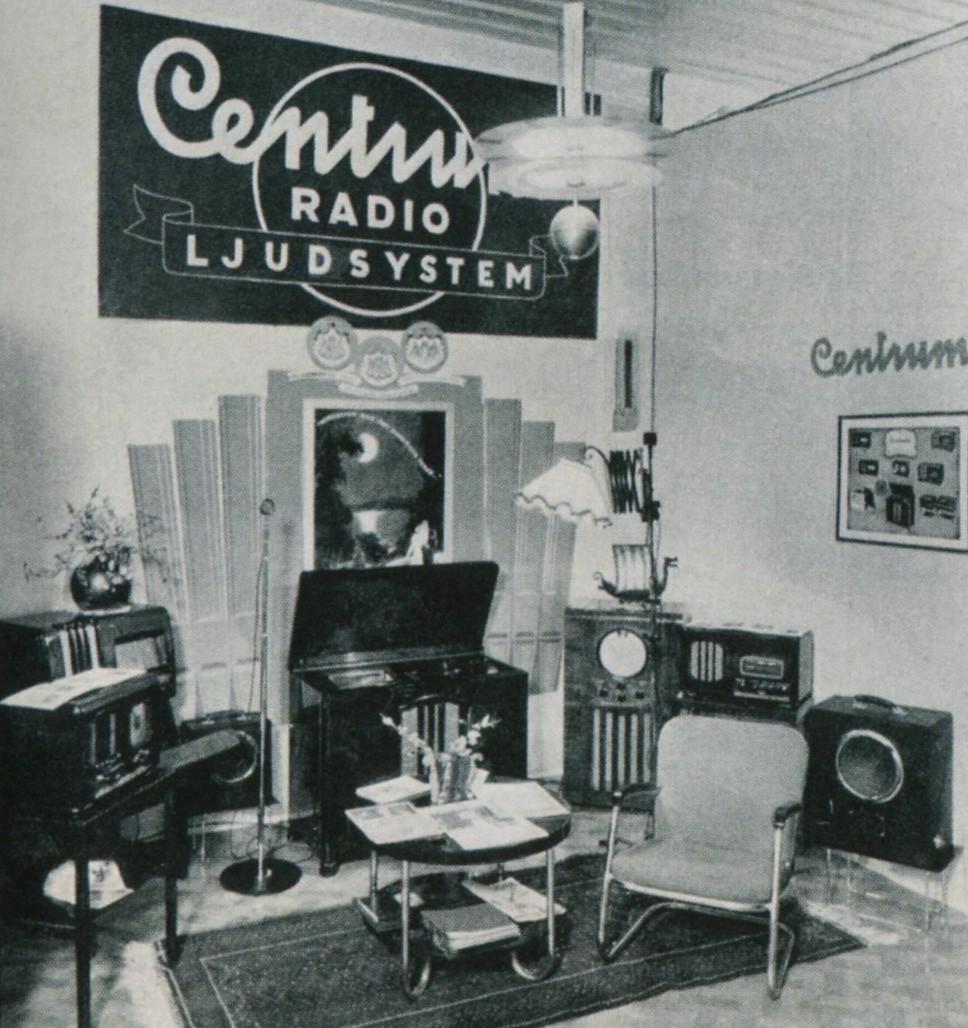
Centrum Radio ljudsysten 1939

The year 1939 in television involved some significant events. Below is a list of television-related events during 1939.

== Events ==
- March 4 – The BBC Television Service broadcasts one of the first television plays specially written for the medium, Condemned To Be Shot by R. E. J. Brooke, live from its London studios at Alexandra Palace. The production is notable for the use of a camera as the first-person perspective of the play's unseen main character.
- March 27 – The BBC broadcasts the entirety of Magyar Melody live from His Majesty's Theatre in London. The 175-minute broadcast is the first showing of a full-length musical by television.
- April
  - Television demonstrations are held at the 1939 New York World's Fair on Long Island and the Golden Gate International Exhibition in San Francisco.
  - RCA, General Electric, Dumont and others begin selling television sets to the public in the New York City area. Screen sizes typically range from 5 to 12 inches, and Dumont features 14-inch and 16-inch models. Prices start at $200 and go as high as $1000.
- April 30 – Franklin D. Roosevelt, appearing at the opening ceremony of the 1939 New York World's Fair, becomes the first President of the United States to give a speech that is broadcast by television.
- May 3 – The Walt Disney cartoon Donald's Cousin Gus airs on NBC's experimental station W2XBS (which eventually became WNBC-TV) in New York. This marks the first movie cartoon to be televised in the United States.
- May 17 – The first baseball game to be televised (Princeton University vs. Columbia University) is broadcast, from Baker Field in New York. Bill Stern is the announcer.
- June 1 – The first heavyweight boxing match to be televised (Max Baer vs Lou Nova) is broadcast, from Yankee Stadium in the Bronx.
- August 26
  - The first Major League Baseball game to be televised (a double-header between the Cincinnati Reds and the Brooklyn Dodgers) is broadcast, from Ebbets Field in Brooklyn, New York.
  - Poland broadcasts a feature film for the first time—Barbara Radziwiłłówna (1936)—using the experimental transmitter mounted atop the Prudential building in Warsaw.
- August 31 – 18,999 television sets have been sold in England before manufacture stops due to World War II.
- September 1 – The anticipated outbreak of World War II brings television broadcasting at the BBC in Britain to an end at 12:35 p.m. after the broadcast of a Mickey Mouse cartoon, Mickey's Gala Premier, various sound and vision test signals, and announcements by presenter Fay Cavendish. It is feared that the VHF waves of television would act as a homing signal for guiding enemy bombers to central London: in any case, the engineers of the television service would be needed for the war effort, particularly for development of radar. The BBC would resume its broadcasting, with the same Mickey Mouse cartoon, after the war in 1946.
- September 30 – 1939 Waynesburg vs. Fordham football game: The first American football game to be televised (between college teams Fordham University and Waynesburg College) is broadcast, from Randall's Island, New York.
- October 22 – The first National Football League game to be televised (The Brooklyn Dodgers vs. Philadelphia Eagles) is broadcast, from Ebbets Field in Brooklyn.
- November 8 – CBS television station W2XAB resumes test transmission with an all-electronic system broadcast from the top of the Chrysler Building in New York City. The station would eventually become WCBS-TV.
- November 23 – The earliest known live telecast of the Macy's Thanksgiving Day Parade is broadcast locally in New York.

== Television shows ==
Series	Debut	Ended
Picture Page (UK)	October 8, 1936	1939
Picture Page (UK)	1946	1952
Starlight (UK)	November 3, 1936	1939
Starlight (UK)	1946	1949
The Disorderly Room (UK)	April 17, 1937	August 20, 1939
For The Children (UK)	April 24, 1937	1939
For The Children (UK)	July 7, 1946	1950
Sports Review (UK)	April 30, 1937	1939
Telecrime (UK)	August 10, 1938	July 25, 1939
Telecrime (UK)	October 22, 1946	November 25, 1946
Let's Talk It Over with June Hynd (US)	June 21, 1939	September 20, 1939
So This Is New York with George Ross (US)	July 5, 1939	September 26, 1939
Wings Over the Nation (US)	October 21, 1939	January 24, 1940

== Programs ending during 1939 ==
Date	Show	Debut
August 20	The Disorderly Room (UK)	1937
Unknown	Sports Review (UK)	1937

== Births ==
- January 4 – Burt Sugarman, American film and television producer
- January 9 – Susannah York, English actress (died 2011)
- January 10 – Sal Mineo, American actor (died 1976)
- January 17 – Maury Povich, American talk show host
- January 22 – Jeff Smith, American chef and presenter (died 2004)
- January 24 – Ray Stevens, American singer
- February 2 – Jackie Burroughs, English-born Canadian actress (died 2010)
- February 6 – Mike Farrell, American actor (M*A*S*H, Providence, Superman: The Animated Series)
- February 9 – Janet Suzman, South African-born British actress
- February 10 – Peter Purves, English actor and television presenter (Doctor Who, Blue Peter)
- February 25 – John Leonard, critic (died 2008)
- March 5
  - Samantha Eggar, English-born actress
  - Michael A. Krauss, American television segment producer
- March 9
  - John Howard Davies, English child actor and comedy director (died |2011)
  - Eugene Lee, American set designer (died 2023)
- March 13 – Neil Sedaka, singer
- March 14 – Raymond J. Barry, actor
- March 21 – Kathleen Widdoes, actress
- March 24 – Lynda Baron, English actress (died 2022)
- March 31 – Israel Horovitz, actor (died 2020)
- April 1 – Ali MacGraw, actress
- April 2 – Marvin Gaye, singer (died 1984)
- April 5 – Roger Davis, actor (Alias Smith and Jones)
- April 7 – David Frost, English satirist and television presenter
- April 9 – Michael Learned, actress (The Waltons)
- April 11 – Louise Lasser, actress (Mary Hartman, Mary Hartman)
- April 13 – Paul Sorvino, actor (Law & Order) (died 2022)
- April 19 – Ellen Weston, actress (S.W.A.T.)
- April 23
  - David Birney, actor (Bridget Loves Bernie) died 2022)
  - Lee Majors, actor (The Big Valley, The Six Million Dollar Man, The Fall Guy)
- April 27 – Judy Carne, English actress and comedian (Rowan and Martin's Laugh-In) (died 2015)
- May 1
  - Mark Slade, American actor (The High Chaparral)
  - Max Robinson, African American journalist (died 1988)
- May 13 – Harvey Keitel, actor
- May 25 – Dixie Carter, actress (Designing Women) (died 2010)
- May 26 – Brent Musburger, sportscaster
- May 30 – Michael J. Pollard, actor (died 2019)
- June 1 – Cleavon Little, actor (died 1992)
- June 8 – Barry Lando, journalist
- June 9 – Dick Vitale, sportscaster
- June 18 (possible date) - Amanda Lear, French Indo-China-born television presenter, singer-songwriter, model, painter and muse
- June 19 – John MacArthur, pastor
- July 4 – Ed Bernard, actor (Police Woman, The White Shadow, Hardcastle and McCormick)
- July 10 – Lawrence Pressman, actor (Doogie Howser, M.D.)
- July 16 – Corin Redgrave, English actor (died 2010)
- July 31 – Susan Flannery, actress (Days of Our Lives)
- August 12 – David Jacobs, writer and producer (Dallas, Knots Landing) (died 2023)
- August 16 – Trevor McDonald, Trinidadian-born British news presenter
- August 21 – Clarence Williams III, actor (The Mod Squad) (died 2021)
- August 22 – Valerie Harper, actress (The Mary Tyler Moore Show, Rhoda) (died 2019)
- August 29 – Joel Schumacher, film director (died 2020)
- August 30
  - William G. Schilling, actor (Head of the Class) (died 2019)
  - Elizabeth Ashley, actress
- September 1 – Lily Tomlin, actress and comedian (Rowan & Martin's Laugh-In, The Magic School Bus)
- September 5 – William Devane, actor (Knots Landing, 24)
- September 11 – Tom Cherones, producer
- September 13 – Richard Kiel, actor (died 2014)
- September 18 – Fred Willard, actor and comedian (died 2020)
- September 26
  - Gerald W. Abrams, American television producer
  - Ricky Tomlinson, English actor (The Royle Family)
- September 28 – Rudolph Walker, British-Trinidadian actor (EastEnders)
- September 29 – Larry Linville, actor (M*A*S*H) (died 2000)
- September 30 – Len Cariou, actor
- October 7 – Clive James, Australian writer, television presenter, talk show host and critic (died 2019)
- October 27 – John Cleese, English actor and comedian (Monty Python, Fawlty Towers)
- October 30 – Danny Goldman, actor (The Smurfs) (died 2020)
- October 31
  - Ron Rifkin, American actor (Alias, Brothers & Sisters)
  - Tom O'Connor, British comedian (died 2021)
- November 11 – Denise Alexander, actress (General Hospital)
- November 15 – Yaphet Kotto, actor (Homicide: Life on the Street) (died 2021)
- November 19 – Garrick Utley, American television journalist (died 2014)
- November 20 – Dick Smothers, actor and comedian (The Smothers Brothers Comedy Hour)
- November 25 – J. J. Jackson, radio and television personality
- November 26 – Mark Margolis, actor (Breaking Bad, The Equalizer, Oz) (died 2023)
- December 27 – John Amos, actor (Good Times) (died 2024)
- December 28 – Yehoram Gaon, Israeli actor and singer
