= First aid (disambiguation) =

First aid is assistance given to any person suffering a sudden illness or injury.

It may also refer to:

- First aid kit, supplies for giving first aid
- First aid room, a place where first aid is administered
- First aid blanket, a blanket which may be used to reduce heat loss in a patient's body
- Mental health first aid, help given to people with mental health problems
- Psychological first aid, a technique devised to help with post-traumatic stress disorder
- Pet first aid, assistance given to pets and other animals

== Organisations ==
- St Andrew's First Aid, a Scottish charity
- First Aid Nursing Yeomanry, a British charity
- First Aid Africa, a British charity

== Other uses ==
- Disk First Aid, a software utility made by Apple Inc.
- First Aid (Transformers), a fictional robot superhero character in the Transformers robot superhero franchise.
- First Aid (TV series), a 1930s British television series
- "First Aid" (short story), a story by Anton Chekhov
- First Aid (film), a 1931 American film
- "First Aid for Dora", a story by P.G. Wodehouse
- "First Aid", a single by Super8 & Tab, 2005

== See also ==
- First aid kit (disambiguation)
