= 1936 in television =

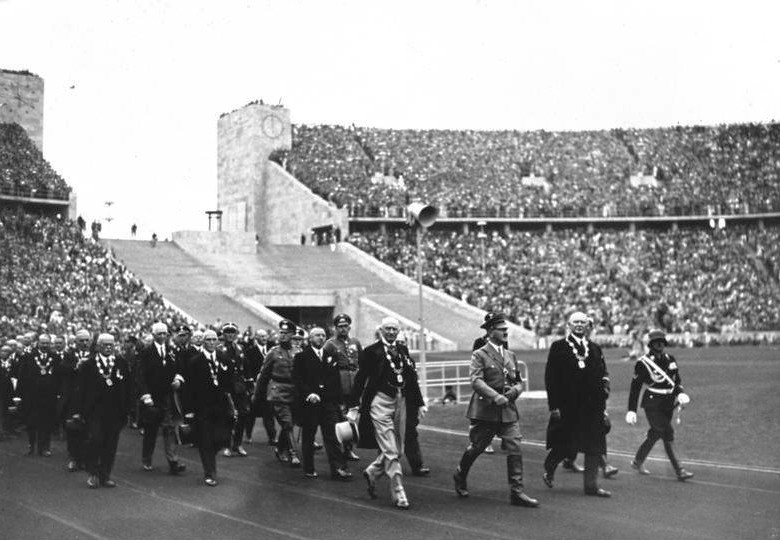
Berlin, opening XI. Summer Olympic Games.- Adolf Hitler accompanied by the International and National Olympic Committee at the Olympic Stadium

The year 1936 in television involved some significant events. Below is a list of television-related events during 1936.

== Events ==
- July 7 – At David Sarnoff's request for an experiment of RCA's electronic television technology, NBC's first attempt at actual programming is a 30-minute variety show featuring speeches, dance ensembles, monologues, vocal numbers, and film clips. It is shown to 225 of RCA's licensees on 22 centimeter screens, 343 lines per picture, 30 pictures per second.
- August – 72 hours of medium-definition (180-line) television broadcasts of the 1936 Summer Olympics in Berlin are seen by approximately 150,000 people in public viewing rooms in Berlin and Potsdam.
- November 2 – The first regular high-definition (then defined as at least 200 lines) television service from the BBC, based at Alexandra Palace in London, officially begins broadcasting (after test transmissions began in August). The service alternates on a weekly basis between John Logie Baird's 240-line mechanical system and the Marconi-EMI's 405-line all-electronic system. Programmes are broadcast daily, Monday to Saturday, at 15:00–16:00 and 20:00–22:00.
- November 6 – NBC in New York demonstrates electronic television to invited members of the press, with a 40-minute program of live acts and films, received on 30 centimeter television screens.
- First coaxial cables are laid between New York City and Philadelphia by the AT&T Corporation; they will transmit television and telephone signals.
- By this year there are approximately 2,000 television receivers worldwide.

== Debuts ==
- October 8 – Picture Page (UK) is first broadcast as part of the BBC's test transmissions prior to launch (1936–1939; 1946–1952)
- November 3 – Starlight (UK), a variety show, debuts on the BBC (1936–1939; 1946–1949).
- Theatre Parade (UK) premieres on the BBC (1936–1938).

== Television shows ==
Series	Debut	Ended
Picture Page	October 8, 1936	1939
Picture Page	1946	1952
Starlight	November 3, 1936	1939
Starlight	1946	1952
Theatre Parade	1936	1938

== Births ==
- January 1 – Valora Norland, actress
- January 25 – Diana Hyland, actress (Peyton Place), (died 1977)
- January 28 – Alan Alda, actor (M*A*S*H)
- February 3 – Mariclare Costello, actress (The Waltons)
- February 4 – Gary Conway, actor (Burke's Law)
- February 11 – Burt Reynolds, actor (Gunsmoke, Dan August, Evening Shade) (died 2018)
- February 14 – Dave Roberts, broadcaster
- February 20
  - Larry Hovis, actor (Hogan's Heroes) (died 2003)
  - Marj Dusay, actress (Guiding Light) (died 2020)
- February 29 – Alex Rocco, actor (died 2015)
- March 5 – Dean Stockwell, actor (Quantum Leap) (died 2021)
- March 9 – Marty Ingels, actor (died 2015)
- March 27 – Jerry Lacy, actor (Dark Shadows)
- April 5 – Glenn Jordan, television director
- April 10 – John Madden, football coach and sportscaster (died 2021)
- April 12 – Charles Napier, actor (died 2011)
- April 14 – Arlene Martel, actress (died 2014)
- April 18 – Richard A. Colla, actor (Days of Our Lives) (died 2021)
- April 22 – Glen Campbell, singer (died 2017)
- April 24 – Jill Ireland, actress (died 1990)
- May 5 – Sandy Baron, actor (died 2001)
- May 9 – Glenda Jackson, actress (died 2023)
- May 10 – Timothy Birdsall, English cartoonist (died 1963)
- May 12 – Tom Snyder, talk show host (died 2007)
- May 14 – Bobby Darin, singer and actor (died 1973)
- May 15 – Anna Maria Alberghetti, singer and actress
- May 17 – Dennis Hopper, actor (died 2010)
- May 18 – Türker İnanoğlu, screenwriter (died 2024)
- May 20 – Charles Kimbrough, actor (died 2023)
- May 23 – Ingeborg Hallstein, actress
- May 27 – Louis Gossett Jr., actor (Roots, Watchmen, Hap and Leonard)
- May 30 – Keir Dullea, actor
- June 8 – James Darren, actor
- June 17 – Ken Loach, filmmaker
- June 22 – Kris Kristofferson, actor
- June 26 – Robert Downey Sr., actor (died 2021)
- June 27 – Shirley Anne Field, actress (died 2023)
- June 30:
  - Nancy Dussault, actress (Too Close for Comfort)
  - Tony Musante, actor (died 2011)
  - Don Taylor, director (died 2003)
- July 1 – Ron Masak, actor (died 2022)
- July 9 – Timothy Johnson, television journalist
- July 24:
  - Ruth Buzzi, actress and comedian (Rowan & Martin's Laugh-In)
  - Mark Goddard, actor (Lost in Space, General Hospital, Many Happy Returns) (died 2023)
- July 25 – Mary Ann Wilson, TV fitness instructor
- July 28 – Jean Doumanian, producer
- August 15 – Pat Priest, actress (The Munsters)
- August 18 – Robert Redford, actor
- August 21 - Wilt Chamberlain, NBA basketball player (died 1999)
- August 29 – John McCain, politician (died 2018)
- September 7 – Bruce Gray, actor (died 2007)
- September 13 – Joe E. Tata, actor (Beverly Hills, 90210) (died 2022)
- September 14 – Walter Koenig, actor (Star Trek)
- September 24 – Jim Henson, puppeteer, creator of The Muppets (died 1990)
- September 25 – Juliet Prowse, actress (died 1996)
- September 28 – Joel Fabiani, actor
- October 14 – Carrie Nye, American actress (died 2006)
- October 16 – Peter Bowles, English actor (To the Manor Born) (died 2022)
- October 17 – Timothy Combe, British director
- October 23 – Anike Agbaje-Williams, Nigerian newsreader (died 2025)
- October 26 – Shelley Morrison, American actress (Will & Grace) (died 2019)
- October 28 – Charlie Daniels, American singer (died 2020)
- October 31 – Michael Landon, American actor and producer (Bonanza, Little House on the Prairie) (died 1991)
- November 2 – Jack Starrett, actor (died 1989)
- November 6 – Roger Welsch, senior correspondent (died 2022)
- November 19 – Dick Cavett, talk show host
- December 3 – Mary Alice, actress (died 2022)
- December 6 – Kenneth Copeland, American televangelist
- December 8 – David Carradine, actor, Kung Fu (died 2009)
- December 22 – Héctor Elizondo, actor (Chicago Hope, Last Man Standing)
- December 23 – James Stacy, actor (died 2016)
- December 29 – Mary Tyler Moore, actress (The Dick Van Dyke Show, The Mary Tyler Moore Show) (died 2017)
