= Color wheel (disambiguation) =

A color wheel or colour wheel is an illustration of color hues around a circle.

Color wheel or colour wheel may also refer to:

- Color wheel (optics), a device that uses different optics filters within a light beam
- The Color Wheel, a 2011 American film

== See also ==
- Chromatic circle, in music
- Color wheel graphs of complex functions, in complex analysis
- Color triangle, an arrangement of colors within a triangle
