= The Adventure of the Three Garridebs =

1924 short story by Arthur Conan Doyle

- Short story by Arthur Conan Doyle
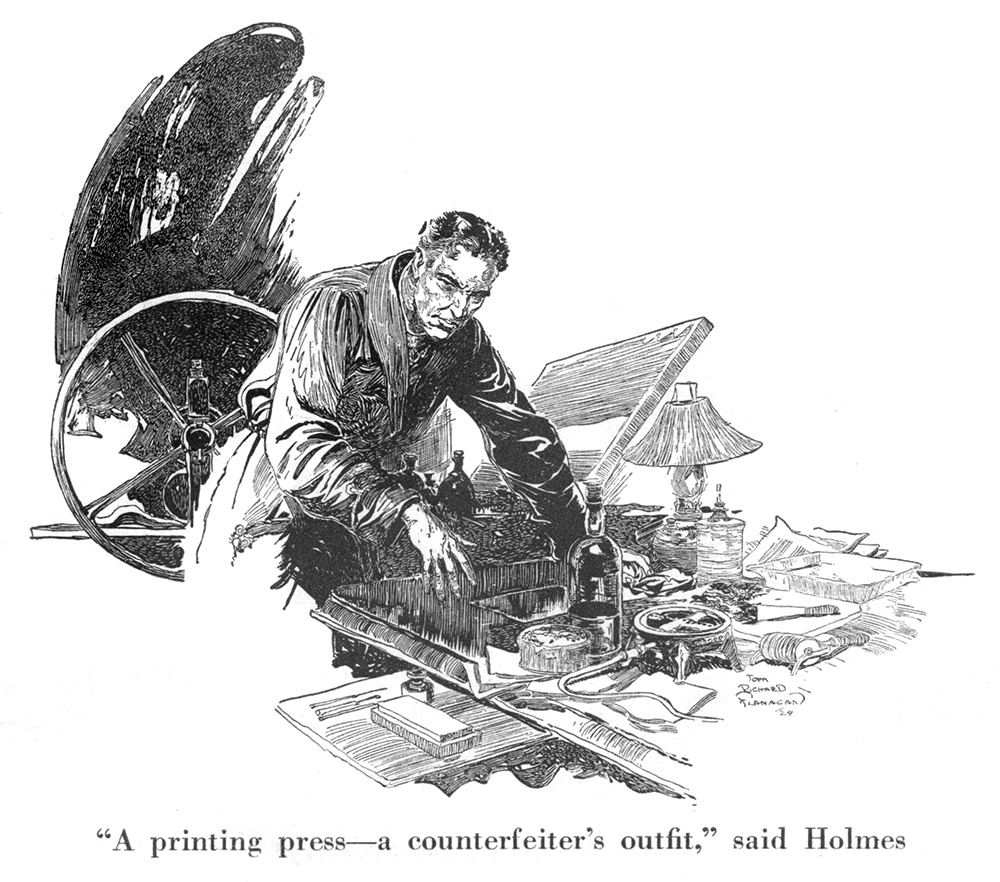
- 1924 illustration by John Richard Flanagan in Collier's

Publication
- Publication date: 1924

Chronology
- Series: The Case-Book of Sherlock Holmes
The Sussex Vampire	The Illustrious Client

"The Adventure of the Three Garridebs" is one of the 56 Sherlock Holmes short stories written by British author Sir Arthur Conan Doyle. One of the 12 stories in the cycle collected as The Case-Book of Sherlock Holmes (1927), it was first published in Collier's in the United States on 25 October 1924, and in The Strand Magazine in the United Kingdom in January 1925.

According to Dr. Watson's opening narration, this story is set at "the latter end of June, 1902 ... the same month that Holmes refused a knighthood for services which may perhaps some day be described." This is a parallel to the knighthood of Arthur Conan Doyle around the same time.

== Plot ==
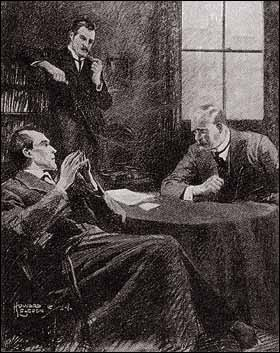
Holmes, Watson, and John Garrideb - 1925 illustration by Howard Elcock

Holmes receives a letter from a man named Nathan Garrideb of 136 Little Ryder Street, in which the writer asks for help in finding someone else who shares his unusual surname. He has been informed by an American, John Garrideb of Kansas, that if he can find another Garrideb he stands to inherit a large fortune.

The American visits Holmes and Watson at 221B Baker Street, and is not pleased that Nathan has involved a private detective. John Garrideb, who claims to be a lawyer, tells a story about meeting a millionaire land tycoon in Kansas named Alexander Hamilton Garrideb, who bequeathed his $15 million estate to John, with the proviso that he find two more men of the same surname to share it with equally. John says he has come to England to seek out people with this name, having failed to find anyone in his home country. So far, he has found only Nathan.

Holmes deduces that John Garrideb has been in London for some time, and is not newly arrived as he claims. When Holmes invents a fictitious Kansas politician, John Garrideb says he once knew him. Holmes does not reveal that he knows John Garrideb is lying, and instead arranges to meet Nathan Garrideb. Upon arrival at Little Ryder Street, Holmes observes Nathan Garrideb's nameplate outside the house. It has obviously been there for years, leading Holmes to conclude that this is his real name.

Nathan Garrideb is an elderly eccentric who collects everything from ancient coins to old bones. Nathan's rooms look like a museum, but he holds nothing of financial value. It is not clear what the American might be after.

During the visit, John Garrideb arrives, having supposedly found a newspaper advertisement purportedly placed by one Howard Garrideb in the course of his everyday business. Holmes observes that John Garrideb must have placed the advertisement himself as the terms and spelling are distinctly American. Despite Nathan's objections, John Garrideb insists that he must travel to Birmingham and meet this Howard Garrideb. Holmes realizes that the whole scheme is John Garrideb's way to get Nathan out of the way for a while.

Next day, Holmes goes to see Inspector Lestrade at Scotland Yard and identifies John Garrideb as James Winter alias Morecroft alias "Killer" Evans, who has escaped from prison after shooting three men in the United States. In London, he had killed Rodger Prescott, a Chicago forger whose description matches the former occupant of Nathan Garrideb's room. Holmes and Watson go to Garrideb's home armed with revolvers. They do not have to wait long before Winter arrives. From their hiding place, Holmes and Watson see the criminal use a "jemmy" to open a trapdoor, revealing a little cellar. They capture Winter, but not before he manages to shoot twice, striking Watson in the leg. Holmes is distraught over Watson's injury, and strikes Winter on the head with the butt of a gun hard enough to draw blood. Fortunately, Watson's wound is superficial. The cellar contains a printing press and stacks of counterfeit banknotes, hidden there by Prescott, the man that Winter had killed.

Winter is sent back to prison. Nathan Garrideb ends up in a nursing home, so great is his disappointment, but many CID men are pleased that Prescott's equipment has at last been found. Despite being hurt, Watson seems the happiest at the adventure's outcome, declaring, from the sight of Holmes's panic and rage over his friend's shooting, that "It was worth a wound, it was worth many wounds, to know the depth of loyalty and love which lay behind that cold mask".

== Publication history ==
"The Adventure of the Three Garridebs" was published in the US in Collier's on 25 October 1924, and in the UK in The Strand Magazine in January 1925. The story was published with three illustrations by John Richard Flanagan in Collier's, and with five illustrations by Howard K. Elcock in the Strand. It was included in the short story collection The Case-Book of Sherlock Holmes, which was published in the UK and the US in June 1927.

As noted by Wilma Morgan:

"The Three Garridebs" takes up many plot elements used in the much earlier story 'The Red-Headed League.' Both stories feature a rather naive, sedentary, middle aged bachelor who happens to sit on a location of great interest to cunning criminals. And in both stories, a very elaborate hoax is cooked up, involving a fake bequest by a fictional rich American, in order to make the bachelor go away and leave the criminals a clear field—which would have worked fine but for Sherlock Holmes seeing through the hoax. One difference between the two stories—and I am not sure that it is an improvement—is that in the second case, unlike the first, the innocent bachelor is deeply hurt and damaged by the hoax worked on him."

== Adaptations ==
=== Audio ===
The story was adapted by Edith Meiser as an episode of the American radio series The Adventures of Sherlock Holmes. The episode aired on 2 June 1932, with Richard Gordon as Sherlock Holmes and Leigh Lovell as Dr. Watson.

Other dramatisations of the story aired on the American radio series The New Adventures of Sherlock Holmes on 25 December 1939 (with Basil Rathbone as Holmes and Nigel Bruce as Watson, and also adapted by Meiser) and 9 May 1949 (with John Stanley as Holmes and Wendell Holmes as Watson).

A radio adaptation of the story, dramatised by Michael Hardwick, aired in 1964 on the BBC Light Programme, as part of the 1952–1969 radio series starring Carleton Hobbs as Holmes and Norman Shelley as Watson.

"The Three Garridebs" was dramatised for BBC Radio 4 in 1994 by David Ashton as part of the 1989–1998 radio series starring Clive Merrison as Holmes and Michael Williams as Watson, featuring Lou Hirsch as John Garrideb.

In 2009, the story was adapted for radio as part of The Classic Adventures of Sherlock Holmes, a series on the American radio show Imagination Theatre, with John Patrick Lowrie as Holmes and Lawrence Albert as Watson.

In 2026, the podcast Sherlock & Co. adapted the story in a three-episode adventure called "The Three Garridebs", starring Harry Attwell as Sherlock Holmes, Paul Waggott as Dr. John Watson and Marta da Silva as Mariana "Mrs. Hudson" Ametxazurra.

=== Television ===
The then-newly formed NBC sought permission from Lady Conan Doyle to produce The Three Garridebs for American television in 1937, the first televised adaptation of Doyle's detective. Louis Hector was cast as Holmes with William Podmore as Watson.

== Sources ==
- Cawthorne, Nigel (2011). A Brief History of Sherlock Holmes. Running Press. ISBN 978-0762444083.
- Dickerson, Ian (2019). Sherlock Holmes and His Adventures on American Radio. BearManor Media. ISBN 978-1629335087.
- Smith, Daniel (2014) [2009]. The Sherlock Holmes Companion: An Elementary Guide (Updated ed.). Aurum Press. ISBN 978-1-78131-404-3.
