= King Richard II (1954 film) =

1954 American TV film

King Richard II is a 1954 American film directed by George Schaefer for the Hallmark Television Playhouse TV series. It starred actor Maurice Evans, who also adopted the teleplay from the original work by William Shakespeare.

== Cast ==
- Maurice Evans as Richard II of England
- Kent Smith as Bolingbroke
- Frederick Worlock as John of Gaunt
- Bruce Gordon as Thomas Mowbray
- Richard Purdy as Duke of York
- Louis Hector as Henry Percy

== Production ==
The film was produced by Albert McCleery and directed by Schaefer. Production and art design was overseen by Richard Sylbert. Costume design was by Noel Taylor.

The screenplay was adapted by actor Evans from the play by Shakespeare. Evans had performed Richard II on stage numerous times before. He had made his Shakespearean debut on TV in a 1953 Hallmark production of Hamlet. King Richard II was sponsored by Hallmark for a reported $175,000.

== Reception ==
The production was well received.
