= Ann Hogarth =

English puppet-master (1910–1993)

Ann Hogarth (puppeteer)
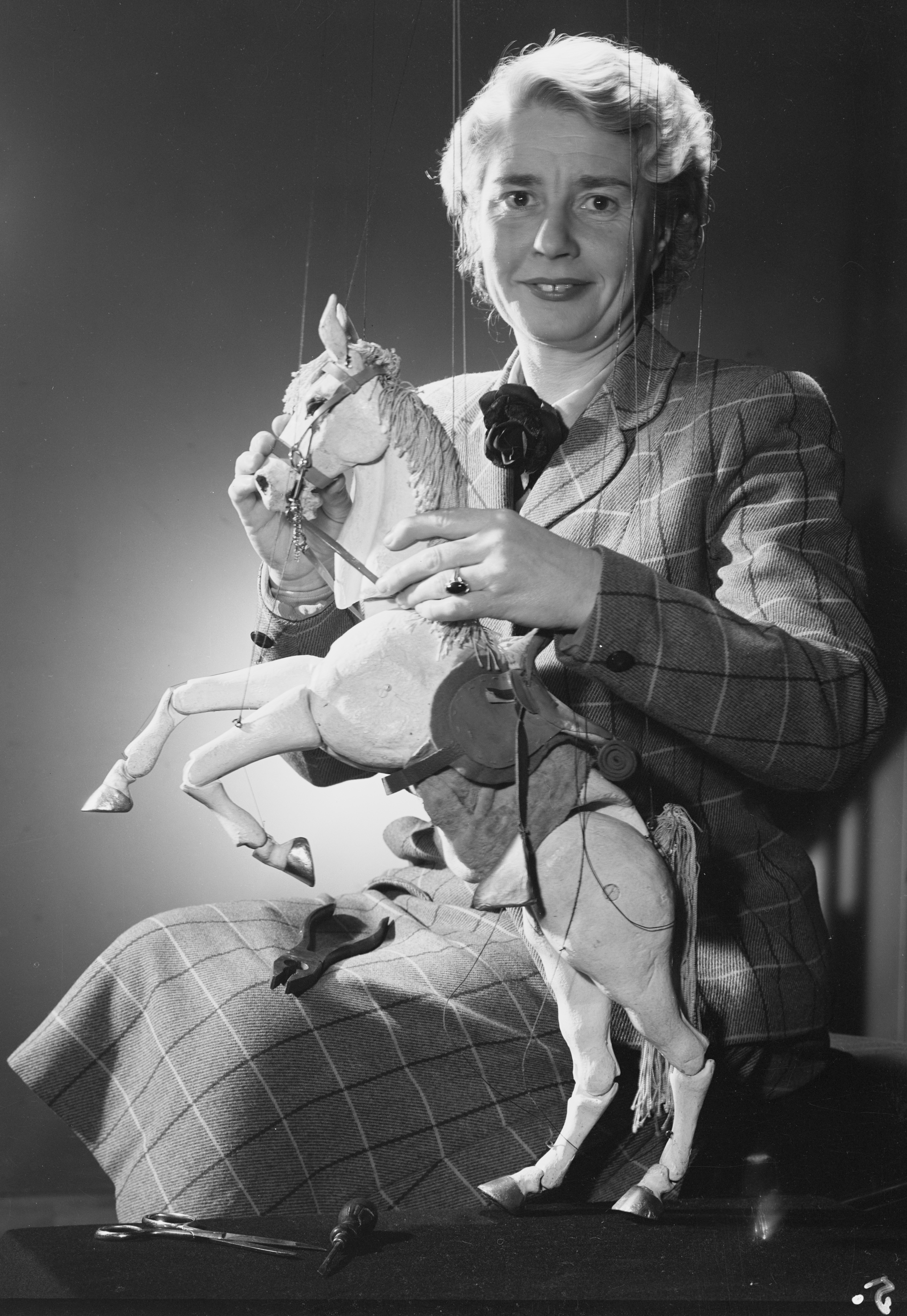
- puppeteer Ann Hogarth with Muffin the Mule, ca. 1952
- Born: Margaret Ann Gildart Jackson; 19 July 1910; Frensham
- Died: 9 April 1993 (aged 82); Budleigh Salterton
- Education: Royal Academy of Dramatic Art
- Occupation: puppeteer
- Employer: Hogarth Puppets
- Spouse: Jan Bussell
- Children: 1

Margaret Ann Gildart Bussell (née Jackson; 19 July 1910 – 9 April 1993), better known as Ann Hogarth, was a British puppeteer. She, her husband, and "Hogarth Puppets" toured the world. She is best known for her puppet Muffin the Mule, which was one of the first stars of early BBC television in the 1940s and 1950s. She and her husband created a large collection of puppets.

== Life ==
Hogarth was born to Olive Mary (née Howle) and William Gildart Jackson who had been a school teacher. She was born the fourth of five children on 19 July 1910 at Hazelgrove, Shottermill, Frensham, Surrey. Her father remarried after her mother died when she was a small child. She was educated at St Catherine's School in Bramley where she discovered a talent for speaking and she resolved to go on the stage. To ensure she had a fallback career she trained as a secretary before studying at the Royal Academy of Dramatic Art. Her qualification got her the job of stage manager at the Players' Theatre in London where she met her future business partner and husband, Jan Bussell in 1932. He had a lifetime interest in model theatres and he had persuaded John Logie Baird to televise one of his puppet productions the year before he and Hogarth created "The Hogarth Puppetts".

Hogarth married Bussell in 1933 as their puppet theatre promised "One and a half hours of scintillating entertainment" at each performance. The two of them commissioned plays and ballets for their puppets which they supplied with different voices. They had puppets made including a mule made by Fred Tickner who was known for his Punch and Judy puppets. Their repertoire included operetta, dance, poetry, Shakespeare and variety. They used marionettes and shadow puppets and a cast that included a complete orchestra. Despite their professional approach the company did not make much money and her husband had a day job directing Sheffield Repertory Theatre when he wasn't with Hogarth, collecting tickets, seeing the audience to their seats or being a puppeteer. Hogarth's daughter, Sally McNally, was born in 1936.

During the war, Hogarth's partner was in the Navy, but in 1946 he had returned to his pre-war job at the BBC in London.

== Muffin the Mule ==
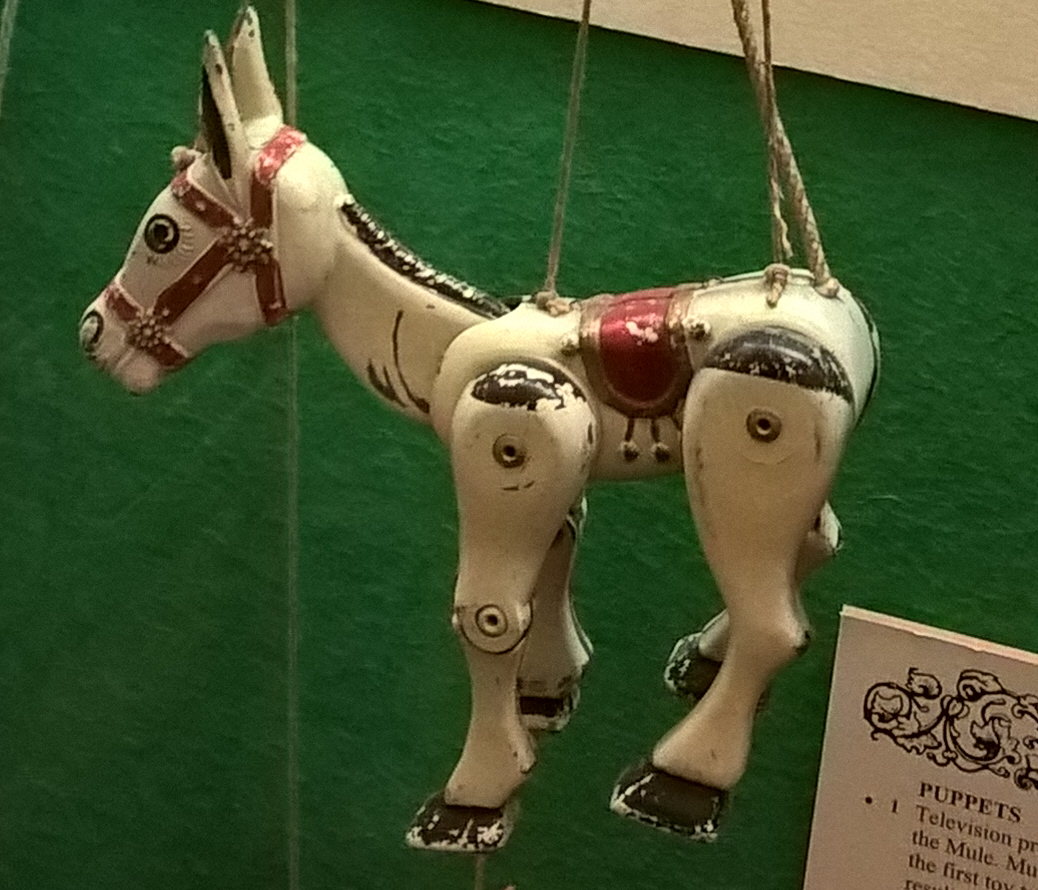
A licensed toy based on the Muffin the Mule puppet

The BBC's first made star is said to be one of their early puppets. Annette Mills had chosen named Fred Tichner's puppet "Muffin the Mule" and he first appeared on 4 August 1946. Hogarth wrote the scripts and Annette Mills created the songs. Every other Sunday the puppets had a fifteen-minute live broadcast in the "For the Children" programme. Muffin had his own mechanised products and Lesney is said to have made the first toy based on a TV programme when they licensed the right to sell a pressed steel version of Muffin as a children's toy. Muffin had another series recorded in 1952. Muffin ran until 1955. The act was soon put away, and the puppet was not taken out again until 1946, when Bussell and Hogarth were working with presenter Annette Mills. She named the puppet mule "Muffin", and it first appeared on television in an edition of For the Children broadcast on 20 October 1946. The character proved popular, and ran on BBC television until 1955. Typically, Muffin danced on top of a piano as Mills played it. Muffin the Mule was supported by a host of other puppets who were made by Stanley Maile. The characters included Crumpet the Clown, Grace the Giraffe, Hubert the Hippo, Katy the Kangaroo, Kirri the Kiwi, Louise the Lamb, Monty the Monkey, Maurice and Doris the Mice, Oswald the Ostrich, Sally the Sea-lion, Peter Pup the dog, Poppy the Parrot, Mr. Peregrine Esquire the penguin and Prudence and Primrose Kitten. Willie the Worm and Zebbie the Zebra. A separate series of 15-minute episodes, "Muffin the Mule", was broadcast from 1952, with his signature tune "We want Muffin". Muffin became a television star, and a wide range of spin-off merchandise was made using the Muffin character, including books, records, games and toys. A die-cast movable puppet was produced by Lesney Products, "the first toy to be marketed under licence as a result of a successful TV appearances."

The BBC decided to discontinue the show in 1955 after Annette Mills' death and Muffin quickly moved to the new ITV channel. He was only briefly on the ITV, but this did not stop either Muffin the Mule or the Hogarth Puppets which continued their fifty years of touring. They went to many European countries, as well as New Zealand. Their Kiwi character was created at the instigation of the Governor of New Zealand.

The Hogarths welcomed other puppeteers to their home when they were not touring in Australia or Canada. The church halls that they had booked themselves in the 1930s were replaced by appearances in the West End. They were able to fund the training of two apprentices and their expertise was sought for major productions that requires puppetry. They created life size puppets of The Water Babies for a production at the Glynebourne Theatre. These puppets later appeared in Australia and they, together with arts grants, are credited with inspiring other puppet productions in the 1960s and 1970s.

== Later life, death and legacy ==
By the time her husband died on 23 April 1985 they had retired from showing their collection of puppets. Hogarth moved to Budleigh Salterton after her husband's death, where her only child continued the family business.

Hogarth died in a nursing home near her house on 9 April 1993, aged 83.

Hogarth and her husband's puppets which they collected as they toured abroad are in a collection in London.

In 2003, it was announced that the BBC would recreate "Muffin the Mule", but Hogarth's naughty character would be replaced by a helpful character and the series would have an animated Muffin.

Some of the BBC episodes survive and are available. Some of the original series was included in a 2006 Doctor Who story titled "The Idiot's Lantern".
