= First Aid (TV series) =

1937 British informative TV series

First Aid is a three-part British television series which aired in 1937 on the BBC. It consisted of advice on what to do in case of accidents. The episodes included Accidents in the Home, Accidents on the Road, and Accidents in Sports. The series aired in a 15-minute time-slot.
