= Molly Blake =

British illustrator

- Born: Molly Suzanne McClenaghan; 14 August 1917; St Albans, Hertfordshire, England
- Died: 9 June 2011 (aged 93)
- Occupations: Illustrator, television presenter, author
- Children: Susie Blake
- Parent(s): Henry McClenaghan; Annette Mills
- Relatives: Sir John Mills (uncle)

Molly Suzanne Blake (née McClenaghan; 14 August 1917 – 9 June 2011) was a British illustrator, BBC children's television presenter and children's author.

== Career ==
Blake studied at the Central School of Art and Design in London.

Her parents were the actress, dancer and broadcaster Annette Mills, best remembered for being the partner of the puppet "Muffin", in the successful BBC Television children's series Muffin the Mule between 1946 and 1955, and her first husband, Henry McClenaghan. Molly produced many of the illustrations in the popular series of children's books of Muffin the Mule stories. One of her drawings of Muffin was used in Radio Times in 1951.

Mills also appeared on television with the glove puppet "Prudence Kitten". After Mills' death in January 1955, Blake took over the role. Her earliest such appearance was on 27 July 1955. She also wrote Prudence Kitten books, but these were illustrated by others.

A 1947 portrait photograph of Blake, by John Gay, is in the collection of the National Portrait Gallery. She was photographed by Gay for, and featured in, an article in The Strand Magazine, "Eight Young Artists in Search of an Editor", in which she was said to be married, and living in Marylebone. Her husband was David H. Blake.

She died in 2011, aged 93.

== Family ==
Her uncle, her mother's younger brother, was the actor John Mills, meaning she was a cousin to his daughters, Juliet Mills and Hayley Mills. Blake illustrated Far Morning by Mary Hayley Bell, John Mills' second wife.

Blake's daughter is the actor Susie Blake.

== Publications ==
=== Books by Blake ===
- Prudence and Primrose. Illustrated by Kathleen Dance. Publicity Products. 1956.
- Prudence and Celia. Illustrated by Sheila Findlay. Publicity Products. 1957.
- Prudence Kitten's ABC. Illustrated by Sheila Findlay. Publicity Products. 1957.

=== Books illustrated by Blake ===
- Mills, Annette (1949). Muffin the Mule. University of London Press.
- Mills, Annette (1950). More About Muffin. University of London Press.
- Mills, Annette (1951). Muffin and the Magic Hat. University of London Press.
- Mills, Annette (1952). Here Comes Muffin. University of London Press.
- Mills, Annette (1952). Jennifer and the Flower Fairies. News of the World.
- Mills, Annette (1953). Muffin at the Seaside. University of London Press.
- Mills, Annette (1954). Muffin's Splendid Adventure. University of London Press.
- Hayley Bell, Mary (1962). Far Morning. Heinemann.
- Arnold, Margaret (1962). In Rosember. Heinemann.
- Hartley, Joan, ed. (1975). Rescue a Recipe. WRVS Magazine.

=== Contributions to other books ===
- My Annette Mills Gift Book. Stories written by Annette Mills. Published by London: The Heirloom Library. [n.d. c. 1955]. Molly Blake illustrates the 5 Muffin the Mule stories in this collection.
