= Muffin the Mule =

British children's TV puppet character (1946–1955)

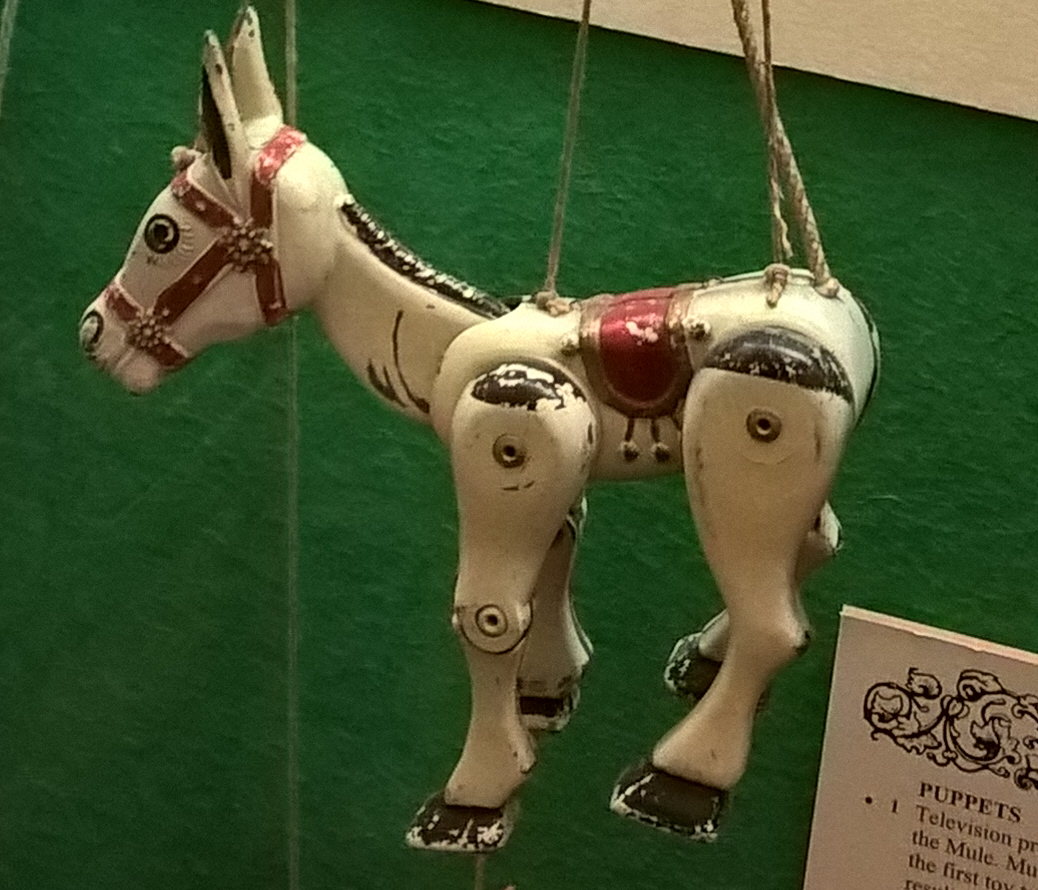
Muffin the Mule puppet on display at the Museum of Childhood, Edinburgh. Diecast metal, Lesney Products, 1951

Muffin the Mule is an animated puppet animal character in a British 1946 to 1955 television show for children. The puppet was made in 1933 for Ann Hogarth. The original TV shows featuring the animal character himself were presented by Annette Mills, and broadcast live by the BBC from their studios at Alexandra Palace from autumn 1946 to winter 1954. Mills and the puppet continued with programmes that were broadcast until 1955, when Mills died. The television series then transferred to ITV in 1956 and 1957. A modern animated version of Muffin the Mule aired on the British CBeebies channel between autumn 2005 and early summer 2011 in the United Kingdom.

== History ==
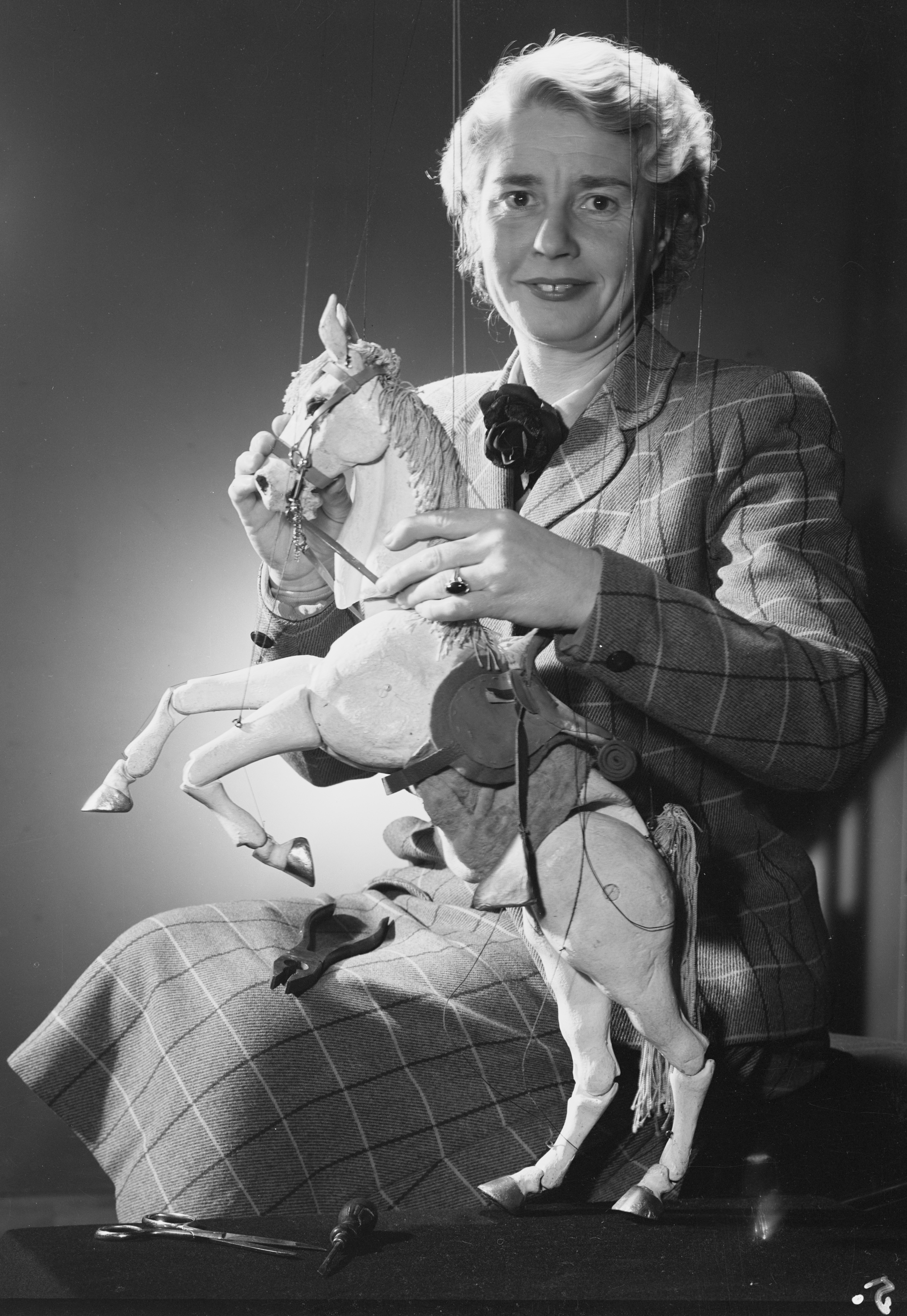
Portrait of puppeteer Ann Hogarth with Muffin the Mule, c. 1952

The original mule puppet was created in 1933 by Punch and Judy puppet maker Fred Tickner for husband-and-wife puppeteers Jan Bussell (1909–1984) and Ann Hogarth to form part of a puppet circus for the Hogarth Puppet Theatre. The act was soon put away, and the puppet was not taken out again until 1946, when Bussell and Hogarth were working with TV presenter Annette Mills. She named the puppet mule "Muffin", and it first appeared on television in an edition of For the Children broadcast on 20 October 1946.

The character proved popular, and ran on BBC television until 1955 when the BBC decided to discontinue the show after Mills' death. Muffin reappeared on BBC television on 27 January 1957 with Jan Bussell as his companion.

Typically, Muffin danced on top of a piano as Mills played. Muffin was supported by a host of other puppet characters who appeared occasionally, including Kirri the Kiwi, Zebbie the Zebra, Hubert the Hippopotamus and Sally the Sea Lion to name just a few. A separate series of 15-minute episodes, Muffin the Mule, was broadcast from 1952, along with his signature tune, called "We want Muffin". Muffin became a television star, and a wide range of spin-off merchandise was made using the Muffin character, including books, records, games and toys. Muffin also was made into one of the first licensed children's rides. A die-cast movable puppet was produced by Lesney Products, "the first toy to be marketed under licence as a result of successful TV appearances."

In the early 1950s, a Fleetways weekly magazine, Woman's Illustrated, featured on its children's page (Gnomes Club) stories about Muffin the Mule and/or his friends. Some were written by Annette Mills and illustrated by Molly Blake, Annette's daughter, such as "Muffin meets the Rear Light" in 1953; others did not state who the illustrator was, such as in 1953 "Muffin's Good Deed" by Mills, and many stories were written and illustrated only by Blake such as "Willie Disappears" (a Muffin story) on 20 August 1955.

Bussell and Hogarth, and later their daughter Sally McNally (1936–2004), continued to use Muffin the Mule in their own shows. Surviving original episodes of Muffin the Mule remain available on digital media in the United Kingdom. Archive footage of the original BBC series was shown on a television set in the 2006 Doctor Who story "The Idiot's Lantern".

Muffin was invited to take part in 2021's Children in Need night.

== Book ==
A book containing a selection of the stories was published in the Soviet Union in 1958. At least three cartoons based on it were made in 1974 and 1975. These cartoons and the book make Muffin a donkey rather than a mule.

A popular television series based on the book was produced in Soviet Estonia and was aired from 1968 to 1972 and again from 1974 to 1976. In the series, Muffin (spelt Maffin) was portrayed as a donkey, voiced by actor Hendrik Toompere Sr. The show achieved wide popularity, and several Estonian public figures who grew up during that period — among them filmmaker and author Mart Sander — have described Maffin as their childhood hero and inspiration.

== 2005–2011 TV series ==
The rights to Muffin the Mule were bought by Maverick Entertainment in 2003, and a new 25 episode animated version of Muffin the Mule was shown on the British CBeebies TV channel. First aired on 14 September 2005 and repeated until 1 August 2008. The new television series was also translated into Welsh as "Myffin y Mul" and broadcast in Wales on the S4C channel.

=== Characters and voice cast (UK only) ===
- Muffin the Mule (voiced by David Holt) – The title character who lives in a caravan and often acts like a big brother to all his friends in Muffinham village, who he loves dearly. Muffin enjoys trying to help all his friends, but he does still tend to sulk or get cross if things do not go his way. He is, however, easily "jollied" out of these moods and is with masses of enthusiasm for life. He is also rather partial to a cup of tea and a slice of carrot cake. His friends all look to Muffin for guidance and despite his little "mischievous" nature, they would do anything for him too. Although Muffin can be quite cheeky, he puts on his red and yellow thinking cap whenever a problem occurs and always does his best to think of a possible solution.
- Peregrine the Penguin (voiced by Jimmy Hibbert) – Muffinham's inventor who lives in an igloo. Peregrine is one of Muffin's closest friends and has appeared in virtually all the episodes along with Muffin. He is very keen to help out, but he does tend to interfere and comes across as quite short and bossy, although he always means well. Peregrine is a very clever and important-but flightless bird, and spends most of the day working, occasionally on top secret things like, "How many sardines a living penguin can fit into his mouth". He does not suffer fools gladly, and is always more than capable of telling them so.
- Louise the Lamb (voiced by Sue Elliot Nicholls) – Monty's best friend with a very unknown accent who lives in a pink and red knitted house of her very own, is also very close friends (and often goes out on walks through and sometimes around the village) with Grace.
- Peter the Dog (voiced by Jimmy Hibbert) – Muffin's best friend who lives in a kennel, and (mostly) has so much energy that he just cannot sit still. He has a very good sense of smell and always wants to use it to try and help solve the mystery or the problem of every show. Although his enthusiasm to help out can get him into big trouble on occasions, like the time when he decided to bury all the precious things that his friends had, as he wanted to protect them and keep them safe from getting lost – on the face of it this does sound like a good idea, but only if he can remember where he buried them in the first place.
- Oswald the Ostrich (voiced by Jimmy Hibbert) – Willie's partner with a thick British accent who is flightless and lives in a garden shed, but has a tendency to walk around the village along with his beak wide open, and so it is often heard in the village of Muffinham that his friends, (particularly his clever friend, Willie the Worm) are calling out "Don't gape, Oswald!" to which Oswald generally replies with a "Duh", even though he is caring and kind. He and Willie the Worm are the best of friends and inseparable and like to bury both their heads in the sandpit for hours on end.
- Willie the Worm (voiced by David Holt) – Oswald's partner with a memorable accent who is often carried around on top of Oswald's back.
- Grace the Giraffe (voiced by Maria Darling) – Louise's closest friend with a soft, light English accent who lives in a lighthouse near Muffinham Beach and is incredibly elegant with her long neck and long eyelashes. Grace is still very good friends with Louise, but whenever they go out for walks in (or around) the village of Muffinham, they make sure that each other are always looking their best. Although Grace's age is not made clear, Grace herself loves nothing more than a good natter with her friends "chewing the cud" over a spot of tea and a really good muffin – the edible variety.
- Monty the Monkey (voiced by Sue Elliott Nicholls) – Muffin's first mate with a memorable British accent who not only lives in a tree house, but has a long tail and can frequently cause mischief in the village. The accidents that Monty sometimes causes are a continuous threat to the calm of Muffinham. If there is either chaos or a mishap anywhere in Muffinham village, the chances always are that Monty will not be "far away".
- Morris Mouse (voiced by David Holt) – One of Monty's neighbours with a memorable upper-class English accent who lives in a straw house with his wife, Doris Mouse. He enjoys digging his potato patch as well as gardening and is ever eager to try and solve problems, as opposed to Muffin.
- Doris Mouse (voiced by Maria Darling) – Morris Mouse's wife and Monty's other neighbour with an English accent who lives in the straw house near Muffinham Village's orchard with Morris Mouse.

== Episodes (2005–2011 TV series) ==
1. Wish Upon A Star (first-ever episode) – Despite stargazing one cool winter's night with Muffin the Mule and Monty the mischievous monkey making a five-pointed "star" out of "silver paper and cardboard" as well as Peregrine the penguin building a "highly powerful telescope" to study the stars and then seeing an alien that looks just like Willie the Worm, Louise the lamb learns that all real wishes must always be kept secret. Episode Animators: Brian Larkin, Paul Cowen

2. The Party – After Grace the Giraffe receives a grammophone from Postman Kangaroo, Louise the Lamb decides to prepare a party in her garden. She invites everyone in the village, including Monty the cheeky monkey. However, when Muffin agrees to help organize the party for Louise and make preparations, Monty the Monkey himself overhears and, after being given the job of delivering the invitations to everyone in Muffinham, he becomes too curious and opens up the six invitations whilst delivering them across the farm, causing him to disorganize them all by mistake. In the end, after Monty eventually apologizes to all the other animal residents for (accidentally) mixing up all the party invitations, Morris and Doris Mouse and the other Muffinham Village pals do the jobs that they were meant to do in the first place, allowing the party itself to take place without any chaos at all. Episode Animator: Laurent Grisel

3. Muffin's Day Off – It is a sunny spring day in Muffinham Village, and Muffin the Mule is looking forward to a relaxing picnic in the woods. However, just about all of the other residents of Muffinham need Muffin to help him solve all their problems. Monty the Monkey cannot cross the raging river unaided, Peregrine the Penguin has lost his only pair of blue "reading glasses", Morris and Doris Mouse cannot decide whether to have red or pink roses beside their straw house's front door, and Grace the Giraffe's hooves are purple instead of grey and black. Muffin the Mule comes to the rescue before sharing his afternoon picnic with all his friends, including Monty the cheeky Monkey. Episode Animators: Brian Larkin, Paul Cowen

4. No Place Like Home – It is a warm summer's day in Muffinham Village and Morris and Doris Mouse are both planning a surprise for Peter the dog – they are going to build him a brand new dog kennel to live in with the help of Muffin and all his crazy animal friends. However, when Peter overhears Morris and Doris Mouse talking about him moving away, he mistakenly thinks that they no longer want him to live with them in their straw house and nonetheless decides to find somewhere else in Muffinham to live. However, after visiting first Peregrine the Penguin, then Grace the giraffe, then Louise the Lamb, then Oswald the Ostrich and Willie the clever Worm and finally Monty the cheeky monkey, Peter the dog runs away and hides in the woods. In the end, it is Muffin the Mule who leads Peter to his new dog-kennel not far from Morris and Doris' garden and is relieved. Episode Animator: Chris Evans

5. Peregrine Helps Out – One chilly autumn day in Muffinham, 4 of the village residents have problems. A noisy seagull is building a nest on top of Grace the Giraffe's lighthouse roof, Willie the clever Worm is fed up of always moving slowly around the village, Louise the Lamb's drainpipe is broken and the bung for Morris and Doris' water butt is "rotten". Peregrine the Penguin is annoyed that everyone in Muffinham Village always goes to Muffin the Mule with all their problems, but is delighted when he is finally asked for some advice, despite him eventually making an aircraft for Willie the Worm, which unknowingly solves everyone's problems in an unusual way before finally crashing head-on into the circular hole in the front of Morris and Doris' water butt with a big bang, damaging it. Episode Animator: Geoff Loynes

6. Moving House – Poor Oswald the Ostrich is desperate to fly and Peregrine the Penguin's new slinger machine gets him up in the air quicker than a gun's bullet. Oswald crash lands into Peter the dog's kennel without warning him. Peregrine is only trying to help, but despite babysitting Peter in his igloo, his actions leave Muffin homeless too, when, that night, the caravan that he lives in rolls down the hill, along with Muffin himself fast asleep on board, in spite of Muffin suddenly forgetting clean about Morris and Doris' armchairs, which Morris and Doris Mouse tell Muffin earlier about "falling to bits". Episode Animator: Mark Mason

7. Whodunnit? – Things keep mysteriously disappearing without a trace in Muffinham Village, first Peregrine the Penguin's best pen, Louise the Lamb's only wool curlers, then Morris Mouse's thief and that it was only Peter the dog who was trying to keep the things safe all along by just burying them underground. Episode Animator: Les Gibbard

8. Oswald's Garden Party – Oswald the Ostrich plans a bumper garden party for all his friends in Muffinham Village and he wants to grow everyone's favourite food. His big, clumsy feet accidentally squash all the seeds and plants. Willie the worm does his best to help out, and, along with his other worm friends, he comes up with a very good solution:- soft, crumbly compost. Episode Animator: Mark Mason

9. Oswald's Big Egg – It's a warm spring day in Muffinham Village, but Monty the Monkey is desperate for someone in Muffinham to bake him a cake, despite him being asked by Willie the Worm to scare away some hungry crows which are attacking Oswald the Ostrich's garden. Episode Animator: Chris Evans

10. Muffin's Photo Shoot – Muffin the Mule decides to take some publicity photographs of all of his friends, in spite of Grace the Giraffe taking a quick shower near the nearby beach to be able to look perfect for the special occasion, and Louise the Lamb wanting Grace's sparkly necklace which she loses, but Peregrine the Penguin eventually finds it stuck inside his "old leaf-blowing machine", along with several fallen tree leaves, which he kindly lends to Morris and Doris Mouse earlier, despite eventually trying unsuccessfully to empty the machine itself when it finally becomes full of old, fallen tree leaves. Episode Animator: Barry Parker

11. Muffin's Mules United – Muffin the Mule keeps fit by skipping with some skipping ropes, and everyone in Muffinham village wants to know how they can join in and get fit too. "Team sports" is the answer, so Muffin starts his own football team called Muffin's Mules United. During their first-ever training session, however, Muffin and his friends discover that they don't have a goal-keeper, so they try to persuade the fitness-shy Grace the giraffe to go between the goal-posts – but she is just not that keen on doing anything too strenuous. However, when Peter the Dog runs off the football pitch, Grace the giraffe goes to get him back, and when she does – she is Muffin's football team's star player, and all is well. Episode Animator: Mark Mason

12. Apple Pie Order – It is a rather cold autumn day in Muffinham Village, and Monty the monkey is mischievously stealing some apples from Morris Mouse's trees. Muffin and Morris Mouse come up with ghostly plans to catch the thief, despite Louise the Lamb planning to go to Grace the Giraffe's lighthouse for tea and having to look her best. Doris Mouse, on the other hand, wants to make some home-made apple pies for everyone else in the village, which she eventually does. Episode Animators: Brian Larkin, Paul Cowen

13. Muffin's Harvest Home – It is the Muffinham Harvest Home Supper, and everyone in the village is busy cooking. Muffin the Mule is in his field, harvesting his oats, Grace the Giraffe is making toffee apples in her lighthouse and Oswald the Ostrich and Willie the Worm are making deliveries using only a wheelbarrow (made out of wood). Monty the Monkey has no choice but to help Louise the Lamb to make carrot cake, which he reluctantly does, before finding Doris Mouse's pink jelly bag, which he steals earlier on. Episode Animator: Laurent Grisel

14. If the Cap Fits – Brrrr! It is a very breezy autumn day in Muffinham Village, and while Muffin the Mule is galloping to Louise the Lamb's rescue, a sudden gust of wind blows his only thinking cap away without him and Peter the Pup noticing. How can poor Muffin solve any problems without his yellow and red thinking cap? While Muffin worries about what to do, Peregrine the Penguin, Monty the Monkey, Oswald the ostrich, Willie the clever Worm and most of all Louise the Lamb all set out to make him a new and suitable thinking cap. In the end, it is Morris Mouse who comes up trumps and returns the thinking cap (which he finds on the head of a scarecrow that he built the day before) to its rightful owner, Muffin, following a hat fight with Doris Mouse earlier on. Episode Animator: Chris Evans

15. Louise Loses Her Top – Louise the Lamb feels frightened when she wakes up one sunny autumn morning to find that Monty the monkey has deliberately stolen her pink woolly roof, along with a plate full of oatmeal biscuits that she had made for Muffin the mule the day before, following a brief chat with Peregrine the inventive penguin. Muffin the Mule and the gang are all keen to help, as Louise the Lamb has been so kind to them all. With some help from some purple scaffolding and Grace the giraffe, Louise's knitted house slowly comes back to life, despite Monty the monkey not being able to knit unaided. Episode Animators: Brian Larkin, Paul Cowen

16. Creepy Crawly – Louise the Lamb and Grace the Giraffe both have a problem with a spider and a fly. Nonetheless, Muffin the Mule and Morris Mouse eventually deal with the creepy crawlies using a glass jar, despite Morris Mouse himself needing some help with picking some newly-grown raspberries from a crop of raspberries that he grew the previous day outside the straw house, along with Doris Mouse's help. Episode Animator: Mark Mason

17. Magnetic Muffin – Muffin the mule saves the day when he eventually finds some buried treasure under the sea, along with a special-but-precious necklace, which Grace the giraffe loses during a picnic and a walk along Muffinham Beach with her close friend, Louise the Lamb. Episode Animator: Mark Mason

18. Jurassic Farce – When Morris Mouse digs up some old skeleton bones in his potato patch, he thinks that he has found the remains of a dinosaur, so he enlists the help of Peregrine the Penguin, Muffin the Mule and the rest of their animal friends to rebuild it. During a game of hide and seek with Willie the Worm, however, Oswald the Ostrich stumbles across the model itself, and he thinks that he has seen a monster. He gathers the troops together in order to help him battle it, but before they can tell him what it really is, he has charged into it and sent it crashing, all over the place. Peregrine the Penguin is not pleased. Eventually, when everyone in Muffinham Village helps Morris Mouse to rebuild the dinosaur, including Grace the giraffe, the animal residents themselves discover that the dinosaur is still not complete, that is, until Morris Mouse tells the other animals that he hasn't "got all the bones". Will the final dinosaur bone ever be found? Episode Animator: Laurent Grisel

19. Oswald's Sandpit – It is a hot, sunny summer's day in Muffinham Village, and annoyingly, Oswald the Ostrich has nearly run out of sand in his sandpit, much to the disappointment of Morris and Doris Mouse. Oswald keeps banging the end of his beak on the sandpit's concrete base, much to Willie the Worm's frustration. While reading a magazine and watching Louise the Lamb sit in her deckchair in her front garden and reading, Monty the Monkey wants a drink of water and some cake to eat, but the sun is just too hot and strong. However, Muffin the Mule eventually comes to the rescue with a good solution and takes the other animals to Muffinham Beach, where, despite meeting Grace the giraffe there, they collect just enough sand (which they bring back to the village the following evening) to load into the sandpit, which, the following morning, makes Oswald the Ostrich feel better and sets Willie the Worm and the other Muffinham Village residents giggling like mad. Episode Animator: Les Gibbard

20. Grow Up, Peter Pup – Peter the dog overhears Morris Mouse saying that he should grow up and then leave home, so, the following morning, after a bad night's sleep in his dog-kennel, he moves out...all by himself. However, Peter the Dog still misses his bowl of nice, warm milk and his pink fluffy slipper. Luckily, Muffin the mule explains to Peter that growing up is difficult for everyone in the world. Episode Animator: Chris Evans

21. Penguin of the Year – Peregrine the Penguin gets too big for his boots when, one cool autumn day in Muffinham Village, he is voted as Penguin of the Year. Episode Animators: Brian Larkin, Paul Cowen

22. Don't Gape, Oswald – Willie the Worm wants Oswald the Ostrich to just stop gaping. Will Oswald ever feel good and complete Willie's mission, or will an afternoon full of red, ripe strawberries and ice cream be doomed?

23. Make My Day – Muffin the Mule, Louise the Lamb and Peregrine the inventive Penguin are going to Muffinham Beach to fish for the day, so Grace the giraffe is relying on Monty the monkey to go shopping for her birthday party. On the way home, Monty finds a tall cherry tree in the orchard and he cheekily fills himself up along with the tree's fruit. Then, he unknowingly leaves the party food on the path and lets Peter the dog eat it all. What will poor Muffin the Mule and the gang have to eat at Grace the giraffe's birthday barbecue party?

24. Crossed Wires – Louise the Lamb is feeling so annoyed that she called and called for Muffin the Mule, but Muffin did not respond, because he was just too far away for her to be heard properly.

25. Paint Your Wagon – Louise the Lamb goes round to Muffin the Mule's field for Breakfast, but she suddenly feels disgusted by the state of his old caravan, so she decides that it needs a new lick of paint.
