= 405-line television system =

Analogue television broadcasting system

The 405-line monochrome analogue television broadcasting system was the first fully electronic television system to be used in regular broadcasting. The number of television lines influences the image resolution, or quality of the picture.

It was introduced with the BBC Television Service in 1936, suspended for the duration of World War II, reinstated in 1946, and remained in operation in the UK until 1985. It was also used between 1961 and 1982 in Ireland, as well as from 1957 to 1973 for the Rediffusion Television cable service in Hong Kong. 405-line was approved as System A in the CCIR assignment of broadcast systems.

Sometimes called the Marconi-EMI system, it was developed in 1934 by the EMI Research Team led by Isaac Shoenberg. The figure of 405 lines had been chosen following discussions over Sunday lunch at the home of Alan Blumlein. The system used interlacing; EMI had been experimenting with a 243-line all-electronic interlaced system since 1933. In the 405 system the scanning lines were broadcast in two complementary fields, 50 times per second, creating 25 frames per second. The actual image was 376 lines high and interlaced, with additional unused lines making the frame up to 405 lines to give the slow circuitry time to prepare for the next frame; in modern terms it would be described as "376i".

At the time of its introduction the 405-line system was referred to as "high definition" – which it was, compared to earlier systems, although of lower definition than 625-line and later standards.

In the United States, the FCC had briefly approved a 405-line color television standard in October 1950, which was developed by CBS. The CBS system was incompatible with existing black-and-white receivers. It used a rotating color wheel, reduced the number of scan lines from 525 to 405, and increased the field rate from 60 to 144, but had an effective frame rate of only 24 frames per second.

== History ==
=== United Kingdom ===
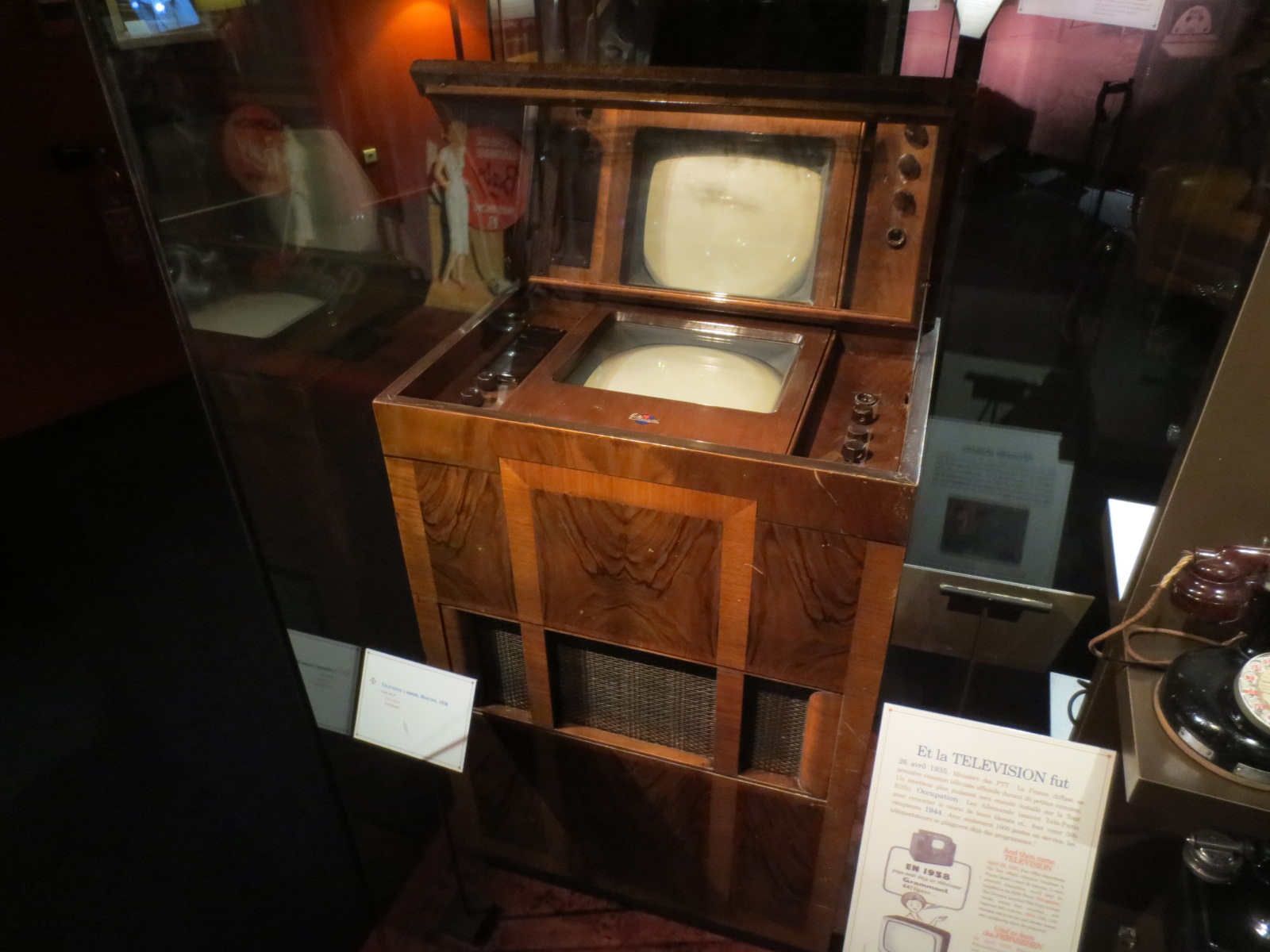
Marconi 405-line mirror TV set from 1936.

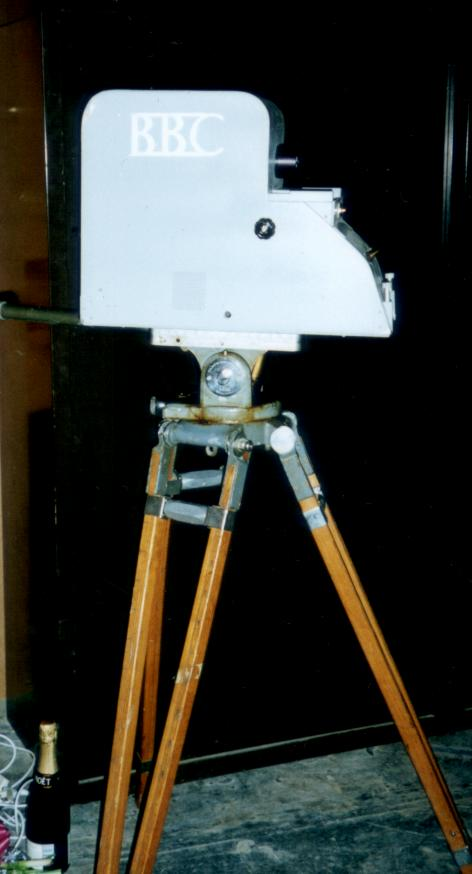
A mock-up of a 1930s EMI Emitron 405-line television camera, constructed for the 1986 BBC drama Fools on the Hill

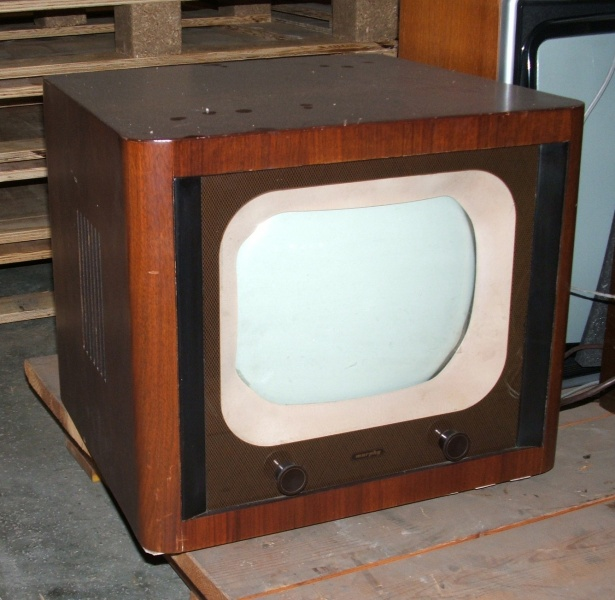
A British Murphy 405-line TV from 1951.

==== Development ====
In 1934, the British government set up a committee (the "Television Committee") to advise on the future of TV broadcasting. The committee recommended that a "high definition" service (defined by them as being a system of 240 lines or more) should be run and established by the BBC. The recommendation was accepted and tenders were sought from industry. Two tenders were received: one from the Baird company offering a 240-line mechanical system, and the other from EMI offering a 405-line all-electronic one. The Television Committee advised that they were unable to choose between the two systems and that both tenders should be accepted, the two systems to be run together for an experimental period.

==== Initial broadcasts ====
Broadcasting of the resulting BBC Television Service from its Alexandra Palace site began in November 1936, at first time-sharing broadcasts with the 240-line Baird system; however, in January 1937, after three months of trials, the Baird system was abandoned in favour of exclusive broadcasting with the 405-line Marconi-EMI system on VHF. This became the standard for all British TV broadcasts until the 1960s.

It soon became apparent that television reception was also possible well outside the original intended service area. In February 1938, engineers at the RCA Research Station, Riverhead, Long Island, New York, in the US, were able to receive the BBC signal 5,000 km (3,100 mi) away, due to the signal being "bounced" back to earth from the ionosphere. A few minutes of programming were recorded on 16mm movie film. This is now considered to be the only surviving example of pre-war live British television. The images recorded included two of the original three BBC announcers, Jasmine Bligh and (in a brief shot) Elizabeth Cowell, an excerpt from an unknown period costume drama, and the BBC's station identification transmitted at the beginning and end of the day's programmes.

The BBC temporarily ceased transmissions on 1 September 1939, the day of the German invasion of Poland, for the outbreak of World War II was imminent. After the BBC Television Service recommenced in 1946, distant reception reports were received from various parts of the world, including Italy, South Africa, India, the Middle East, North America and the Caribbean.

The BBC lost its monopoly of the British television market in 1954, and the following year the commercial network ITV, comprising a consortium of regional companies, was launched.

==== Experimental colour transmissions ====
During the late 1950s and early-to-mid 1960s, some experimental colour broadcasts were made in the UK with the 405-line system using NTSC colour encoding (this encoding was a 1953 enhancement of the original 1941 NTSC monochrome standard, added to the NTSC standard so that it could also provide for colour broadcasting). The subcarrier frequency was 2.6578125 MHz (525/2 times line frequency) with an "I" signal bandwidth of 500 kHz and a "Q" signal bandwidth of 300 kHz. Tests with PAL, SECAM and other NTSC subcarrier frequencies were also attempted.

Some of these broadcasts were on UHF (also an experimental technology at the time), while others were carried over the regular VHF network outside of normal broadcasting hours.

==== Co-existence with 625-line broadcasts ====
In 1964, the BBC launched its BBC2 service on UHF using only a 625-line system, which older sets could not receive. For several years BBC1 and ITV transmitted using the 405-line and BBC2 with the 625-line standard; the only way to receive them all was to use a complex "dual-standard" 405- and 625-line, VHF and UHF, receiver. The introduction of colour on BBC2 in 1967 necessitated an even more complex dual-standard set to receive all three channels with BBC2 in colour. Over time in 1968 and 1969, the different ITV regional channels and BBC1 switched over to broadcasting on the 625-line as well as the 405-line, a process which once completed meant that only 625-lines were necessary to receive all channels, with dual standard receivers no longer necessary.

In November 1969, BBC1 and ITV started broadcasting in 625-line PAL colour on UHF. Their programming was now entirely produced using the new 625-line standard, and thus the 405-line broadcasts served only as a rebroadcast in monochrome for people who did not have the newer receivers and who could only receive BBC1 and ITV. This situation continued up to 3–4 January 1985, with 405-line VHF receivers only being able to pick up BBC1 and ITV regionals, and in monochrome only, while 625-line UHF receivers could also receive BBC2 and Channel 4/S4C in addition to BBC1 and ITV, and in either colour or monochrome.

==== Switchover ====
One reason for the long switchover period was the difficulty in matching the coverage level of the new UHF 625-line service with the very high level of geographic coverage achieved with the 405-line VHF service.

The last 405-line transmissions were seen on 4 January 1985 in Scotland; they had been officially shut down one day earlier in the rest of the UK (although they were actually switched off at various points the next day). This left only the UHF PAL system in operation in the UK. The frequencies used by the 405-line system were initially left empty, but were later sold off; they are now used for other purposes, including DAB and trunked PMR commercial two-way radio systems.

=== Ireland ===
Ireland's use of the 405-line system began in 1961 (officially 31st of December 1961), with the launch of Telefís Éireann, but only extended to two main transmitters and their five relays, serving the east and north of the country. This was because many people in these areas already had 405-line sets for receiving UK broadcasts from Wales or Northern Ireland. Telefís Éireann's primary standard was 625-line; it began using this in the summer of 1962, more than two years before the UK had any 625-line channels.

The last 405 line transmitters in the UK and Ireland were shut down in 1985.

The last 405-line relays, in County Donegal, were turned off in 1982; the main transmitters had been shut down in 1978 to free up frequencies for RTÉ 2, and after then the relays had been fed by standards converters from the local 625-line transmitter.

For the last five years of RTÉ's 405-line simulcasting, a simple orthicon converter was used, essentially a 405-line camera pointed at a 625-line monitor, as the more expensive system converters that RTÉ had previously used were now inoperable.

=== Hong Kong ===
The 405-line system was used in the Rediffusion Television cable television service in Hong Kong, established in 1957, making it both the first British colony and the first predominantly Chinese city to have television. The service of 405-line system ended in 1973, replaced by 625-line PAL system free-to-air broadcast.

=== Europe ===
For a brief time in 1939 there were experimental 405-line transmissions from stations in Montrouge in France and Eindhoven in the Netherlands, Czechoslovakia and Switzerland.

=== United States (field-sequential color system) ===
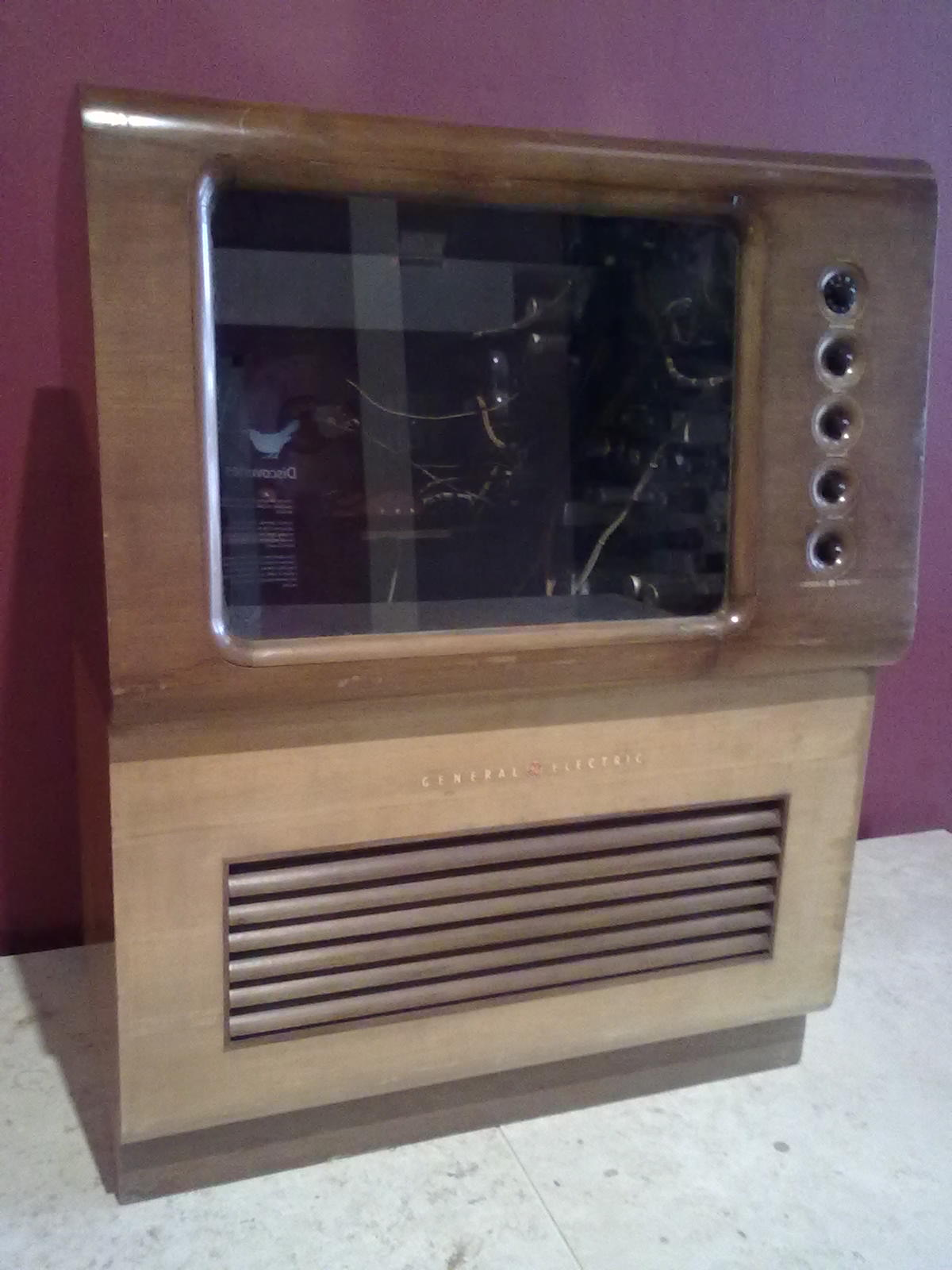
General Electric 950 colour wheel television receiver, manufactured in 1946 for CBS 405-line field-sequential colour system.

After the U.S. adopted the NTSC 525-line monochrome standard for commercial broadcasting in 1941, subsequent efforts were made to upgrade the standard so that it could also accommodate a "compatible" colour broadcasting system. Eventually these efforts would prove successful, but because repeated attempts had consistently produced unsatisfactory results, in 1950 the United States Federal Communications Commission (FCC) officially approved for commercial broadcast an alternate 405-line broadcasting system which the Columbia Broadcasting System (CBS) had developed over the past decade.

This system was a field-sequential colour system which electronically transmitted a 405 lines, 144 fields per second monochrome picture. Colour was provided mechanically by means of a synchronized rotating transparent Red-Green-Blue disk, which was placed in front of the receiver screen.

Regular broadcast channels were used to transmit the 405-line system signals, but the millions of existing NTSC 525-line television receivers could only correctly process the audio portion of these transmissions, so unless these sets were modified they would only display a jumbled picture.

CBS aired a variety show special entitled Premiere on 25 June 1951 to officially launch commercial 405-line colour broadcasting, but just four months later CBS ended its colour broadcasts. CBS's efforts were hindered from the beginning by a widespread lack of acceptance, and the ultimate setback came at the end of the year when the U.S. government temporarily banned the manufacture of colour televisions, ostensibly to conserve resources during the Korean War.

In 1953, the FCC rescinded its approval of the CBS 405-line colour system. In its place it approved a newly improved and now satisfactory second NTSC 525-line standard which had been developed by RCA. It provided for colour broadcasting yet remained compatible with existing 525-line monochrome sets.

== Technical details ==
=== System A ===
405-line is System A in the CCIR assignment of broadcast systems. The audio uses amplitude modulation rather than the frequency modulation in use on modern analogue systems. In addition, the system was broadcast in an aspect ratio of 5:4 until 3 April 1950, when it changed to the more common 4:3 format.

All System A transmitters used vestigial sideband transmission, with the single exception of Alexandra Palace in London, which closed down in 1957 when it was replaced by Crystal Palace.

System	Lines	Frame rate	Channel bandwidth (in MHz)	Visual bandwidth (in MHz)	Sound offset	Vestigial sideband	Vision modul.	Sound modul.	Aspect ratio	Effective resolution (4:3)
System A	405	25	5	3	−3.5	0.75	Pos.	AM	4:3 (5:4 before 1950)	503 × 377 (theoretical)

=== Field rate ===
Since the mid-1930s it has been standard practice to use a field frequency equal to the AC mains electric supply frequency (or a submultiple thereof), 50 Hz in most countries, (60 Hz in the Americas) because studio lighting generally uses an alternating current supply to the lamps and if these were not synchronized with the field frequency, an unwelcome strobe effect could appear on TV pictures. Secondly, the smoothing (filtering) of power supply circuits in early TV receivers was rather poor, and ripple superimposed on the DC could cause visual interference. However, the main problem was the susceptibility of the electron beam in the CRT being deflected by stray magnetic fields from nearby transformers or motors. If the picture was locked to the mains frequency, this interference would at least be static on the screen and thus relatively unnoticeable. The very earliest TV sets used a mains transformer; care had to be taken in design to prevent the transformer's stray magnetic field from disturbing the electron beam in the CRT.

=== Vertical resolution ===
An interlaced system requires accurate positioning of scanning lines so the horizontal and vertical timebase must be in a precise ratio. This is done by passing the one through a series of electronic divider circuits to produce the other. Each division is by an odd integer. Therefore, there has to be a straightforward mathematical relationship between the line and field frequencies, the latter being derived by dividing down from the former. The technology constraints of the 1930s meant that this division process could only be done using small integers, preferably no greater than 7, for good stability. The number of lines was odd because of 2:1 interlace. The 405-line system used a vertical frequency of 50 Hz (standard AC mains supply frequency in Britain) and a horizontal one of 10,125 Hz (50 × 405 ÷ 2 or, using the frame rate, 25 x 405), with 405 being derived from (3 × 3 × 3 × 3 × 5).

=== Video recordings ===
==== Original ====
A few 405-line videotapes still survive. However, the majority of surviving 405-line programmes are in the form of black and white film telerecordings, usually with optical soundtracks. Occasionally video re-recording would be employed instead, with a 625-line camera pointing at a 405-line monitor. This preserves the original 50-field interlaced format, but with some geometrical distortions owing to the curvature of the CRT monitors used at the time.

==== Modern ====
405-line programming may be recorded and played on an unmodified VHS or Betamax video recorder, as long as the input to the recorder is baseband rather than RF. Thus, various modern video recordings of 405-line programming also exist. Betamax was sometimes preferred for this, as the dropout compensator could be switched off on certain models for use with PCM digital audio decoders.

== Comparison with later standards ==
=== Bandwidth ===
When used with vestigial sideband filtering, the total bandwidth of a 405-line TV channel is 5 MHz, significantly less than the 8 MHz required by the 625-line System I, which replaced it in Britain. Systems in other countries used anything between six and fourteen megahertz of bandwidth per channel.

=== Coverage ===
The use of VHF frequencies combined with the narrow vision bandwidth — AM signals (at VHF low band frequencies) are less affected by noise as bandwidth is reduced — meant that 405-line signals could be received well even under marginal conditions. Therefore, it was possible to cover virtually all of the UK with a relatively small number of transmitting stations.

=== Susceptibility to impulse interference ===
The use of AM (rather than FM) for sound and the use of positive (rather than negative) video modulation made 405-line signals very prone to audible and visible impulse interference, such as that generated by the ignition systems of vehicles. Such interference manifested itself as a loud popping on sound and large bright spots on the picture, which viewers found much more noticeable than the dark spots encountered when such interference is encountered on a signal using negative video modulation. With positive modulation, interference could easily be of similar amplitude to the sync pulses (which were represented by 0–30% of the transmitter output). The early time-base circuits were less able to discriminate between the signals and the picture would break up. By contrast, in negative modulation sync, pulses represent peak transmitter output (70–100% output). As a result, impulse interference would cause visual dark spots before it was large enough to affect the synchronisation of the picture. If the interference was large enough, the picture was probably unwatchable anyway. The later introduction of flywheel sync circuits rendered the picture much more stable, but these could not have alleviated some of the problems with positive modulation. Almost all television systems that succeeded the 405-line system adopted negative modulation for this reason alone.

=== Automatic gain control ===
The AGC circuit was problematic. First-generation AGC merely detected the average value of the transmitted signal; however, due to the positively modulated carrier, peak power represented peak white – not guaranteed to be present. Thus for a completely black picture, the AGC circuit would increase the RF gain to restore the average carrier amplitude. The result was a screen that was not black but mid-grey. In fact, the total light output of early TV sets was practically constant regardless of the picture content.

By the mid-1950s, several manufacturers started to introduce gated-AGC systems to avoid this issue. A delayed pulse was derived from the recovered line-sync signal. This pulse would trigger a gate which would sample the received video signal during the "back porch" which was a guaranteed black-level transmitted between the end of the line-sync pulse and the start of the picture information.

The introduction of negative modulation in later systems simplified the problem because peak carrier power represented sync pulses (which were always guaranteed to be present). A simple peak-detector AGC circuit would detect the amplitude of only the sync pulses, thus measuring the strength of the received signal.

=== Whistle due to line output transformer magnetostriction ===
The 405-line system produced a noticeable 10.125 kHz whistle in many sets, equal to the number of lines per second. This high-pitched whistle was caused by magnetostriction in the line output transformer.

This is a common artifact in sets that use a cathode-ray tube. While all CRT-based television systems produce such a noise, the higher number of lines per second in later standards produces frequencies (PAL's 15.625 kHz and NTSC's 15.734 kHz) that are at the upper end of the audible spectrum, which not all people are able to hear. Modern sets using plasma, LCD or OLED display technology are completely free of this effect as they are composed of a million or more individually controllable elements, rather than using a single magnetically deflected beam, so there is no requirement to generate the scanning signal.

=== Equalizing pulses ===
The absence of equalizing pulses to facilitate interlace was defended at the start of the BBC service on the grounds that it only caused a lack of interlace with field synchronizing separators of the integrator type, and that there were, even at that time, numerous other circuits which gave completely accurate interlace without equalizing pulses. The question was raised again from time to time, but a series of tests, conducted during 1952 in cooperation with the British Radio Equipment Manufacturers' Association, confirmed that there was no general need for equalizing pulses.

=== Spot wobble ===
On some larger TV screen sizes, the scanned lines were not fat enough to give 100% coverage of the CRT. The result was a lined picture with darkness between each horizontal scanned line, reducing picture brightness and contrast. Larger screen sets often used a spot wobble oscillator, that slightly elongated the scanning spot vertically at high frequency to avoid this line separation effect without reducing horizontal sharpness. Spot wobble was also utilised when making telerecordings of 405-line programmes.

== See also ==
- Broadcast television system
- Television systems before 1940
- 441-line television system
- 405-line transmitters of the United Kingdom
- 525-line television system
