= 405-line transmitters of the United Kingdom =

Before they were decommissioned between 1982 and 1985, there were many instances of 405-line transmitters in the United Kingdom, having first been used in 1936. Below is a list of all transmitters:

== The 405-line transmitter network of the United Kingdom ==
Alexandra Palace in London hosted the first 405-line transmitter, active between 1936 and 1939, then again from 1946 through to 1956. From 1949 onwards, the Band I VHF 405-line BBC transmitter network grew quickly.

Channel	Vision Carrier Frequency
B1	45.00 MHz
B2	51.75 MHz
B3	56.75 MHz
B4	61.75 MHz
B5	66.75 MHz

In 1955, with the advent of ITV a parallel effort to provide a Band III network was also underway. The pre-1955 BBC stations used the five channels of Band I, but with the introduction of Band III, some BBC stations started appearing there too (most of them on channels 12 or 13). All ITV transmitters were in Band III (mostly on channels 8, 9, or 10).

Channel	Vision Carrier Frequency
B6	179.75 MHz
B7	184.75 MHz
B8	189.75 MHz
B9	194.75 MHz
B10	199.75 MHz
B11	204.75 MHz
B12	209.75 MHz
B13	214.75 MHz

There were eventually 41 high-power "main stations" owned by either the BBC or the IBA (see below). Most were built during the 1950s. The BBC's last main station to enter service was Belmont in Lincolnshire in November 1966; the IBA's last main station was the Welsh service from St. Hilary which went on-air in February 1965.

The main stations were supported by a large number of off-air relay stations to fill awkward gaps in the service from the main stations. The last of these (Llanelli in south Wales (BBC) and Newhaven in southeast England (IBA)) had been built by late 1970.

The entire system was decommissioned between 1982 and January 1985.
