= The Planets: A Modern Allegory =

Radio play, written in verse, by Alfred Kreymborg

The cover of the 1938 edition of The Planets.

The Planets: A Modern Allegory is a radio play, written in verse, by Alfred Kreymborg. The first performance was on 6 June 1938 by the National Broadcasting Company at the Hayden Planetarium in New York City, and was directed by Thomas L. Riley. The play was originally set to the music of The Planets Suite by Gustav Holst; for the first performance the NBC Symphony Orchestra was conducted by H. Leopold Spitalny. The first broadcast was so enthusiastically received that it was repeated a few weeks later.

The play describes the early history of the twentieth century, including the onset of World War I, and the 'hysterical' 1920s, ending with a mix of dread and uncertainty about the future. The book of the play is dedicated 'to peace'; it was published by Farrar & Rinehart, New York, in 1938. The central figure of the play is the Astrologer, who encounters the various planets in turn, as the events of world history are alluded to in a somewhat prophetic tone.

== Cast of the first performance ==
Kreymborg's inscription in a first edition of the play. The inscription is to William Thornton, the actor who played the Astrologer in the first performance, and reads: "To William Thornton the "Astrologer" who saved the Author. Alfred Kreymborg. 9/12/38"

Astrologer	William Thornton
Mars	Winfield Hoeny
Venus	Selena Royle
Mercury	Burford Hampden
Jupiter	Charles Webster
Saturn	Louis Hector
Uranus	William Shelley
Neptune	George Gaul
Narrator	John Brewster
Echo	Emile Beliveau
Husband	Earle Larimore
Wife	Francis Nabors
