= Color wheel (optics) =

Optical light device that uses different optics filters within a light beam

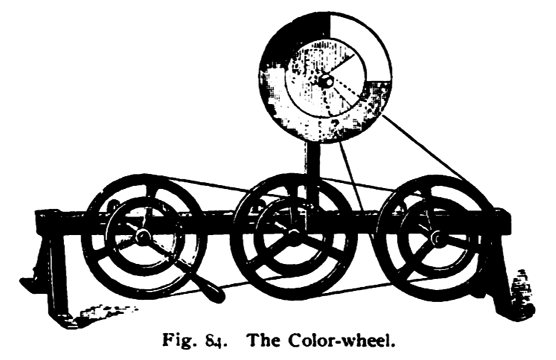
An 1895 mechanical color wheel, used for experiments with color vision

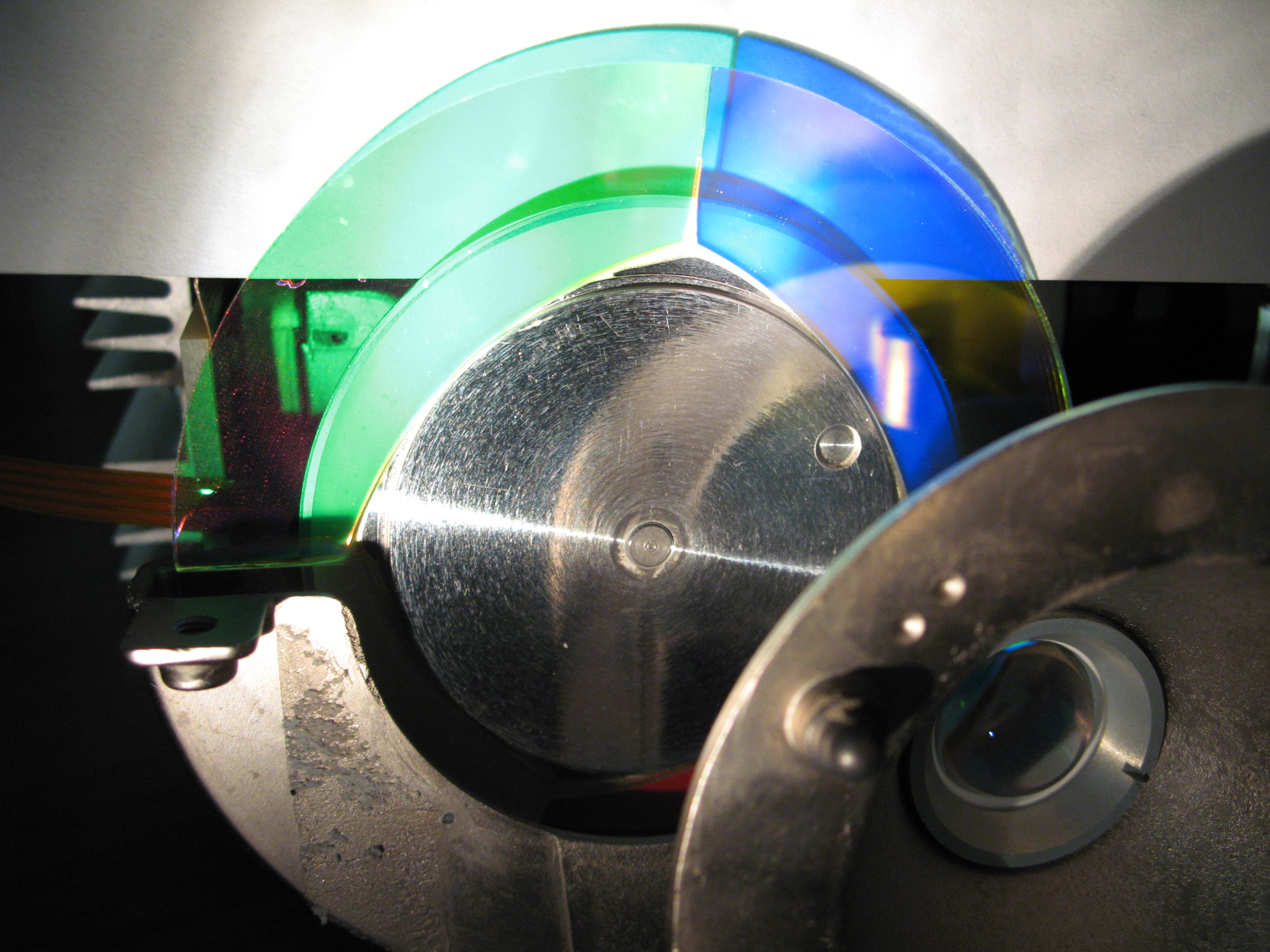
A mechanical four-petal (red, green, blue, white) color wheel inside a 1998 digital light processing (DLP) video projector

A color wheel or other switch for changing a projected hue (e.g., for an optical display) is a device that uses different optics filters or color gels within a light beam. Common usage includes continuously-rotating wheels for seasonal home displays (e.g., at Christmas) and controllable color wheels for a particular instrument (e.g., SeaChanger Color Engine for stage lighting), while non-wheel devices include scrollers and semaphore types with lever arms (e.g., on the 1897-1917 Grand Army Plaza fountain).

== In projectors ==
A common application of the color wheel is to provide a color filter for a single-chip projector, which would otherwise only be able to display a greyscale image. The color wheel is placed in front of the light source (usually a metal-halide lamp) and spins rapidly, splitting the light into red, green, and blue primary colors. The chip then displays each primary color one at a time, quickly enough that the human eye will see them as a full-color image. This method is not perfect; in high-contrast scenes, such as a bright streetlight against a night sky, or the credits at the end of a film, the individual color frames may be visible; therefore, high-end and professional projectors split the light with a prism and use three separate chips, one for each primary color.

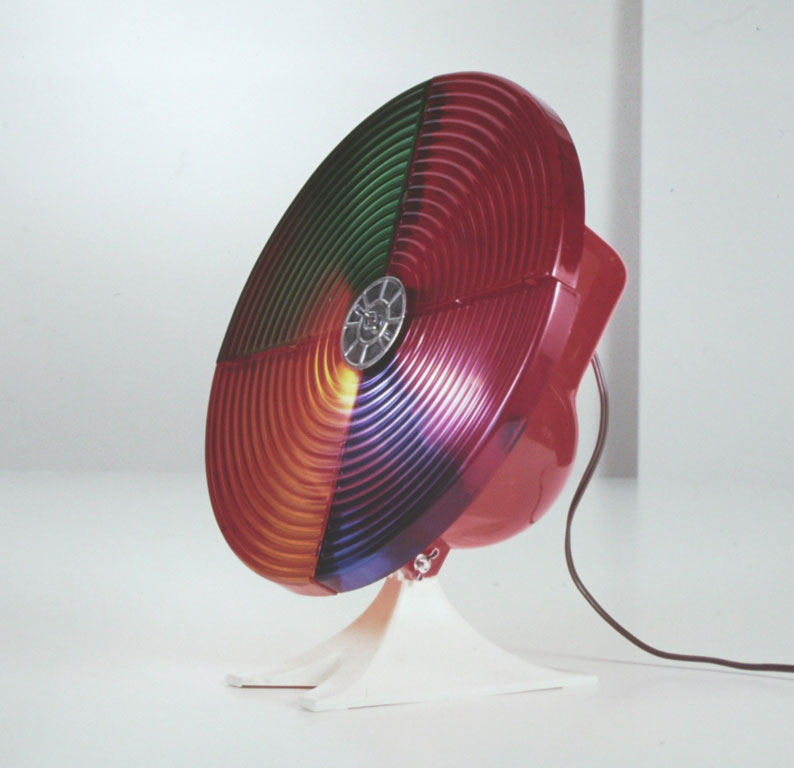
A color wheel lamp, c. 1960, utilized for decorative purposes, in the collection of The Children's Museum of Indianapolis.
