= The Three Garridebs =

1937 television film by Eustace Wyatt

- Written by: Thomas H. Hutchinson
- Directed by: Eustace Wyatt
- Starring: Louis Hector; William Podmore; Violet Besson; Arthur Maitland; James Spottswood
- Country of origin: United States
- Original language: English

Production
- Production company: NBC Blue

Original release
- Network: NBC
- Release: November 27, 1937

The Three Garridebs is a 1937 television presentation that aired on NBC, based on Sir Arthur Conan Doyle's 1924 story "The Adventure of the Three Garridebs". Louis Hector played Sherlock Holmes, the first actor to do so on television.

== Production ==
In 1937, NBC received permission from Conan Doyle's widow, Lady Jean Conan Doyle, to produce a live adaptation of Conan Doyle's "The Adventure of the Three Garridebs". NBC television director Thomas H. Hutchinson began scripting the teleplay, which was so faithful, with much dialogue nearly verbatim, that it was published three years later in a textbook on broadcast production. It is considered the first known television pilot.

Hector, cast as Sherlock Holmes, had previously portrayed Holmes in an American radio series from 1934 to 1935. He had also played Holmes' arch-nemesis Professor Moriarty on the series.

Outside of an opening scene using previously filmed footage of the London skyline, the bulk of the action took place on studio sets of 221B Baker Street and the home of Holmes' client Nathan Garrideb. Only three sets were built: 221B Baker Street, Nathan Garrideb's home and Inspector Lestrade's office. Previously filmed footage of Hector and Podmore riding in a hansom cab was used to link the action on the sets.

== Reception ==
The teleplay was performed live six times during the final week of November 1937. The New York Times called it "...the most ambitious experiment in teleshowmanship so far attempted in the air above New York" and said "in six performances for members of The American Radio Relay League, the ingenious welding of film and television production offered an interesting glimpse into the future of a new form of dramatic art..." The cast was praised as well: "Louis Hector, in traditional cape, peaked cap, and double-breasted suit, played Holmes in the approved manner and at all times gave the impression that a manhunt was in progress ... His determined manner throughout gave convincing evidence of the ultimate outcome—that the detective would surely 'get his man'."

== Cast ==
- Louis Hector as Sherlock Holmes
- William Podmore as Doctor Watson
- Violet Besson as Mrs. Hudson
- Arthur Maitland as John Garrideb
- James Spottswood as Nathan Garrideb
- Eustace Wyatt as Inspector Lestrade
- Selma Hall as Mrs. Saunders
