= First aid kit (disambiguation) =

A first aid kit is a collection of medical supplies and equipment, often portable.

First aid kit may also refer to:

- First Aid Kit (album), a 2005 release by Disco Ensemble
- First Aid Kit (band), a Swedish folk band active since 2007
