= SeaChanger Color Engine =

Lighting device used for entertainment

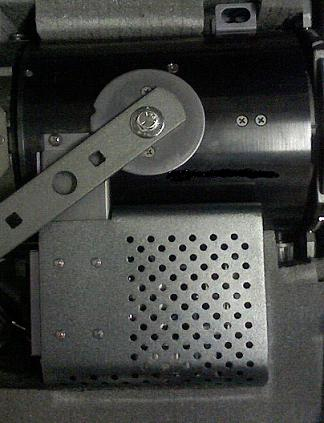
Ocean Optics SeaChanger Unit

The SeaChanger Color Engine is an electro-mechanical device that is used to control light color in entertainment-industry lighting applications. The unit employs four overlapped color filter wheels, inserted into a light beam near its source, to produce colored light. This is in contrast to color scrollers, which insert color filter ribbons into a light beam. The color engine, which was released by Ocean Thin Films in 2005, is designed to fit into the Source Four lighting instrument made by Electronic Theatre Controls.

== Technology ==
The SeaChanger Color Engine is designed to fit between the reflector assembly and lens barrel of a Source Four ellipsoidal, replacing the gobo slot and accessory slot. It is designed to be installed without tools.

The unit is available in profile and wash versions. The profile model uses the lens barrel and reflector assembly of a Source Four, while the wash model uses only the reflector assembly. The manufacturer provides a lens assembly for the wash unit. There is also a high-intensity discharge lamp (HID) model available wherein only the lens barrel from the Source Four is used in the profile fixture. The wash version of the HID fixture is a completely stand alone unit, not using Source Four components at all, although the same color engine technology is used.

The color engine contains integral power supply and communication interface. The unit mounts between the lamp housing and the barrel assembly of a Source Four fixture, meaning that it is placed directly in front of the source, or lamp and before any optics or beam shaping devices. Inside the unit, four micro-lithographed dichroic filters are gradually saturated from 0-95%. The optional Studio Dichroic color filters are gradually saturated from 0-100%. Wheel colors are standard CMY, having one wheel each for cyan, magenta, and yellow, as well as one green wheel. The SeaChanger profile is unique in that its green color filter increases its color gamut to include deep blues, reds and greens that are difficult to create through dichroic color mixing. The green wheel may be replaced with black for mechanical dimming purposes in HID fixture applications or other applications where dimmers are not available. Stepper motors turn each of the wheels to create colors, with wheel position and speed controlled by a four-channel DMX512 or RDM signal from a lighting console.
