= First Aid Africa =

Charitable organisation based in Scotland

First Aid Africa is humanitarian charity that works in rural parts of south eastern Africa to provide sustainable equipment and education in first aid. The charity explains that 'a small amount of medical knowledge and equipment' can make a difference. Volunteers and students receive some training before travelling to Africa to teach first aid and survival skills in settings such as local communities, schools, orphanages and villages.

== History ==
The organisation was set up in 2008 at Heriot-Watt University by Sam Abrahams, originally as a student society. Later that year Abrahams was selected as one of three contenders for the Endsleigh Student of the Year award. It in 2010 the organisation was part of "The Big Training Project".

Abrahams sought volunteers from several UK universities, including: Robert Gordon University, Queen Margaret University, the University of Edinburgh, Edinburgh Napier University, Heriot Watt University, Stirling University, Birmingham City University, the University of Nottingham, and Brunel University.

First Aid Africa registered with the Office of the Scottish Charity Regulator as a charity in 2014, but as of April 2017 it has not filed any details relating to financial activity. It received Small Grants Funding from the Scottish Government in 2015 and 2016

It has run First Aid training in Malawi since 2009. It also operates in Tanzania, Kenya and Uganda. Each partner country has a member of full-time staff who are paid to carry out the vital training and support their communities in-between expeditions. In 2015 four volunteers from St. Andrew's First Aid were involved. St Andrew's First Aid have also donated personal protective equipment.

Abrahams described some of the work of First Aid Africa at a TedX event in Spain in 2012.
