= Annette Mills =

English broadcaster and entertainer (1894–1955)

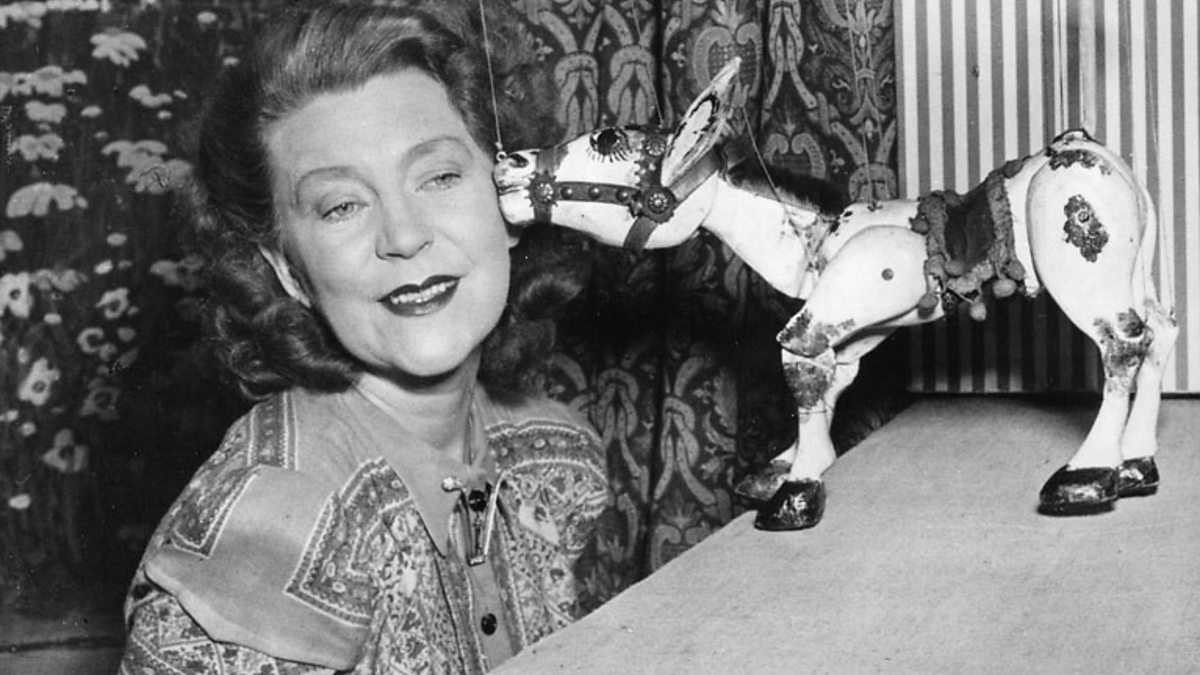
- Mills with her creation Muffin the Mule
- Born: Edith Mabel Mills; 10 September 1894; Wandsworth, London, England
- Died: 10 January 1955 (aged 60); London, England
- Occupations: Broadcaster, entertainer, songwriter, dancer, writer
- Years active: 1915–1955
- Notable work: Muffin the Mule
- Spouse(s): Henry McClenaghan (divorced); Robert Sielle (divorced)
- Children: Molly Blake
- Relatives: John Mills (brother); Susie Blake (granddaughter); Juliet Mills (niece); Hayley Mills (niece)

Annette Mills (born Edith Mabel Mills; 10 September 1894 – 10 January 1955) was an English actress, dancer, songwriter and television presenter, best known for presenting the children's television show Muffin the Mule.

== Early life ==
Annette Mills was born in Wandsworth, London, the daughter of teacher Lewis Mills and his wife Edith. Her younger brother John Mills became a successful actor. She was the aunt of Hayley Mills and Juliet Mills. Annette grew up in Belton, near Great Yarmouth, where her father became a headteacher, and studied in King's Lynn and Norwich before studying the piano and organ at the Royal Academy of Music. She intended becoming a concert pianist; but after her fiancé was killed in action, she married, had a daughter, and worked as a dancing teacher in Notting Hill.

== Dancer and songwriter ==
After meeting dancer Robert Sielle (born Cecil Leon Roberts), they formed a dancing partnership. They put on exhibition dances, had a residency at the Piccadilly Hotel, and after a visit to the United States were credited with introducing the Charleston to Britain in 1925. Mills and Sielle married, but were later divorced. They continued to perform together until Mills was forced to give up dancing, after breaking her leg on stage in Cape Town.

Instead, she turned her hand to songwriting and singing, and began to appear regularly as an entertainer on BBC Radio, singing light comedy songs and accompanying other singers on the piano. She wrote "A Feather in Her Tyrolean Hat", recorded by Gracie Fields in 1936, and wrote and sang the novelty dance song "Boomps a-Daisy", recording it with the Joe Loss Orchestra in 1939. She also composed "Adolf", sung by Arthur Askey in the 1940 film Band Waggon. She appeared in cabarets and revues in London and Paris, and wrote the music and lyrics for C. B. Cochran's shows. In 1942, during the Second World War, she was on her way back from entertaining troops in France when she was involved in a serious car accident, which left her hospitalised for the next two years. She wrote short stories and plays during the period, some of which were broadcast. Her comic play Rotten Row was later televised.

== "Muffin the Mule" ==
She made her first BBC Television appearance in June 1946, as a singer, pianist and story teller on For the Children. She suggested that the top of her piano could be used as a stage for puppets to illustrate her stories, and a disused marionette of a mule, whom she called "Muffin", was used. Mills is now best remembered for being the partner of "Muffin" between 1946 and 1955. She wrote the songs and the music, including Muffin's popular theme song, while puppeteer Ann Hogarth wrote the scripts. Muffin the Mule used to clip-clop around on top of the piano, whilst Mills played a tune. She wrote several Muffin the Mule songbooks and an adventure tale about him, as well as making records. The shows were broadcast live until 1952, when they began to be filmed.

Later, Mills and Muffin were joined in the BBC's For the Children spot by Prudence the Kitten, Mr Peregrine the Penguin, Sally the Sea-Lion, Louise the Lamb, Oswald the Ostrich, and Morris and Doris the field mice. Although all of the puppets captured the hearts of millions of young viewers, it was Muffin who gained the most attention. The press commented how the programme had fired children's imaginations. The success of the show led to a wide range of merchandising for children, as well as the publication of comics.

== Personal life and death ==
Annette Mills was married twice, with a daughter, Molly Blake, by her first husband, Henry McClenaghan; her second marriage, to Robert Sielle, ended in divorce. Molly was a successful illustrator and produced many of the illustrations in the popular series of children's books of Muffin the Mule stories. Molly's daughter – and Mills's granddaughter – is the actress Susie Blake.

Mills also took at least one female lover. In the late 1920s she embarked on an affair with the painter Gluck. Gluck's partner, the journalist Sybil Cookson, discovered them together on the floor of Gluck's studio at Bolton House and subsequently ended her relationship with Gluck as a result.

Annette Mills became a life member of the Vegan Society in 1952.

Mills suffered a nervous breakdown in November 1954, and died eight days after her last TV appearance on 10 January 1955. She died from a heart attack in hospital after an operation on a brain tumour.

She bequeathed her body to the Royal College of Surgeons.

== Publications ==
- Boompsa-A-Daisy! A New Old Fashioned Party Dance (1939)
- Muffin the Mule (1949), illustrated by Molly Blake
- More About Muffin (1950)
- Muffin and the Magic Hat (1951)
- Ten Prudence Kitten Adventures (1951)
- Here Comes Muffin (1952)
- Muffin and the Magic Mat (1952), illustrated by Molly Blake
- Muffin and his Friends (1952)
- Muffin Makes Magic (1952)
- The Purple Muffin Book (1953), illustrated by Jennetta Vise
- Muffin at the Seaside (1953), illustrated by Molly Blake
- Muffin on Holiday (1953)
- Colonel Crock (1953), illustrated by Edward Andrewes
- Muffin's Splendid Adventure (1954), illustrated by Molly Blake
- Muffin's Birthday (1954), illustrated by Anne Hogarth
- Muffin and Peregrine (1954)
