= For the Children =

British television programme category (1937–1950s)

For the Children is the umbrella title given to British television programmes and sequences targeted at children of school age, in the early years of the BBC Television Service. The title was first used in 1937 at 3pm as the opening programme for afternoon viewing (as television would generally be broadcast from 3pm to 4pm and then later, from 9pm to 10pm). Suspended in 1939 along with the rest of BBC Television for the duration of World War II, it returned on 7 June 1946, running on Sunday afternoons and expanded to twenty minutes in length.

The series featured a variety of different presenters and acts: story readings, puppet shows, songs. On Saturday 13 March 1937, George Queen's Pantomime Goose was shown in the For the Children slot, the opening programme before In Your Garden came on at 3:10pm. In October 1946 the "hugely popular" children's puppet Muffin the Mule made his television debut on the show, accompanied by his "friend" Annette Mills. The puppet's character was devised by the puppeteer Ann Hogarth.

For the Children was last broadcast in December 1951, when "Children's Television" became the title used for the afternoon children's sequences, until use of an overall title was abandoned in the late 1950s.
