= Louis Hector =

American actor

- Born: March 19, 1883; England
- Died: October 1968 (aged 85); New York City, U.S.
- Occupation: Actor
- Years active: 1925–1954

Louis Hector (March 19, 1883 – October 1968) was an American radio, theater, film, and television actor. He is best known for his roles of Sherlock Holmes in the 1937 broadcast of The Three Garridebs (the first US televised portrayal of Sir Arthur Conan Doyle's protagonist Holmes); and that of the Reverend Browne in MGM's 1940 Technicolor release of Northwest Passage.

== Life and career ==
Hector was born in March 1883 in England. He started his acting career in Theatre performances in London and Broadway. He acted in several plays in London, mainly Shakespearean, with actress Jane Cowl before emigrating to the US in 1920, where he appeared in several Broadway productions, including No More Ladies, and Arms and Men; and choreographed duels in Ziegfeld's 1928 musical version of Three Musketeers.

Hector made his American radio debut on WJZ in New York in 1924, and played many roles on American radio including Long John Silver and William Tell. Hector worked regularly as a radio performer in the 1930s, often portraying Sir Arthur Conan Doyle's protagonist, Sherlock Holmes. Hector was chosen to play Holmes in an early NBC experimental television broadcast of The Three Garridebs on November 27, 1937. This is the first televised adaptation of the Sherlock Holmes character. The show ran for 30 minutes, and was processed in black and white. The New York Times wrote a positive review of his performance in the teleplay.

"Louis Hector, in traditional cape, peaked cap, and double-breasted suit, played Holmes in the approved manner and at all times gave the impression that a manhunt was in progress ... His determined manner throughout gave convincing evidence of the ultimate outcome—that the detective would surely 'get his man'." —The New York Times review, The Three Garridebs

== Death ==
Hector died in New York City in early to mid-October 1968, his obituary was published in the New York Times on October 19.

== Radio, film, and TV work ==
Hector performed on radio in the NBC Blue network radio series The Adventures of Sherlock Holmes. He played Professor Moriarty in at least one episode, "The Missing Leonardo Da Vinci", which aired on May 19, 1932. From 1934 to 1935, he played Sherlock Holmes in the series. Only three episodes of Hector as Holmes are believed to have survived to 2020. Hector played Holmes in 29 episodes. Many of these episodes, particularly those that aired in 1934 and early 1935, were new stories or based on non-Sherlock Holmes stories by Arthur Conan Doyle (such as "The Case of the Lost Special", which aired on 18 November 1934), while the episodes that aired in 1935 were generally based on Doyle's Sherlock Holmes stories. The episodes in which Hector portrayed Holmes that were based on Doyle's Sherlock Holmes stories include the following:

- "The Adventure of the Red Circle" – aired February 10, 1935
- "The Adventure of the Devil's Foot" – February 17, 1935
- "The Adventure of the Engineer's Thumb" – February 24, 1935
- "The Adventure of the Dying Detective" – March 3, 1935
- "The Adventure of the Bruce-Partington Plans" – March 17, 1935
- "The Adventure of the Beryl Coronet" – March 24, 1935
- "The Veiled Lodger" – March 31, 1935
- "The Three Gables" – April 7, 1935
- "The Gloria Scott" – April 14, 1935
- "A Case of Identity" – April 21, 1935
- "The Three Students" – April 28, 1935
- "The Adventure of the Copper Beeches" – May 5, 1935
- "The Man with the Twisted Lip" – May 12, 1935
- "Silver Blaze" – May 19, 1935
- "The Reigate Puzzle" – May 26, 1935

Hector's other performances include:

Film and TV

- The Three Garridebs; televised play with two pre-filmed segments; 1937; Sherlock Holmes; performed live six times
- Northwest Passage; MGM film; 1940; Reverend Browne
- Tales of Tomorrow; TV series; June 20, 1952; Dr. Bache
- King Richard II; TV film; 1954; Henry Percy; Hallmark Hall of Fame (#3.18)

Radio

- The Planets: A Modern Allegory; (radio play); 1938; Saturn
- The New Adventures of Sherlock Holmes; radio series, 1939–50; Professor Moriarty; recurring role; NBC Blue radio network and Mutual Broadcasting radio network.
- Great Plays; radio series; 1938–1940; various characters; seven episodes
  - Richelieu; radio episode; February 5, 1939; Richelieu
  - The Tempest; radio episode; November 24, 1940

== Theatre work ==
- Romeo and Juliet; London
- Antony and Cleopatra; London
- Pelleas and Melisande; London
- The Road to Rome; London
- Inherit the Wind; National Theatre, Dayton, Ohio; 1924
- No More Ladies; Broadway; New York
- Arms and Men; Broadway; New York
- Three Musketeers Musical (choreographer); Broadway; New York
