= Sports Review =

British television programme

Sports Review is an early British television programme, produced by the BBC, and broadcast by their BBC Television Service during the late 1930s. It was the first regular sports programme to be transmitted by television.

The programme was presented by BBC Radio presenter Howard Marshall, and transmitted once per month. Each edition would endure for twenty minutes and featured Marshall reviewing notable sporting events that had occurred during the past month and interviewing sportsmen and women. Film clips from relevant sporting events would also be shown.

The first episode was shown on 30 April 1937, and the series continued until the suspension of the BBC Television Service for the duration of World War II during September 1939. The programme was not reinstated upon the resumption of the service during 1946. As the editions were all transmitted live from the BBC's Alexandra Palace studios, and the BBC did not have any professional method of recording broadcasts at the time, nothing survives of the series in the archives, except for some still photographs.
