= Theatre Parade =

Theatre Parade is a British television programme, one of the world's very first regular series, broadcast by the BBC Television Service from its inception during 1936 until 1938. The programme presented excerpts from popular London theatre productions of the time performed by the theatre cast from the BBC's studios at Alexandra Palace.

Among the productions (by George More O'Ferrall) included in the strand were the first ever television presentations of Lewis Carroll's works Alice Through the Looking-Glass (a twenty-five-minute excerpt, transmitted on 22 January 1937) and Alice in Wonderland (29 April, 1 May and 26 December 1937). The very first television adaptation of an Agatha Christie story was a production in this series with two transmissions of Wasp's Nest on 18 June 1937. The programme guide in the periodical Radio Times noted that the play "has never previously been performed anywhere" and that "Televiewers will be the first to see this" adaptation of Christie's story. As with all television programmes of the time, the shows were performed live, and no visual record other than still photographs now exist.
