= The Disorderly Room =

The Disorderly Room is a musical comedy sketch written by the actor and writer Eric Blore during the First World War. It was first performed at the Victoria Palace Theatre, London, in 1919 and starred Blore, Stanley Holloway, Tom Walls, Leslie Henson and Jack Buchanan. The sketch consists of supposed military disciplinary proceedings put to the tunes of popular songs of the day.

The sketch was taken up by the comedian Tommy Handley, who performed it, in the words of his biographer, "on every music-hall stage in the country". He performed it at the Royal Command Performance at the London Coliseum in 1924, which was broadcast by the BBC. Handley subsequently performed in the sketch on eight occasions on radio, and four times on television, between 1926 and 1939. With an unnamed supporting cast he recorded the sketch for the Zonophone label in 1927. The recording has been reissued on LP and CD.

== Sources ==
- Holloway, Stanley; Richards, Dick (1967). Wiv a little bit o' luck: The life story of Stanley Holloway. London: Frewin. OCLC 3647363.
