= Starlight (TV series) =

British TV variety series (1936–1949)

- Country of origin: United Kingdom

Original release
- Network: BBC Television Service
- Release: November 3, 1936 – 1949

Starlight is an early British television programme, one of the first regular series to be broadcast by the BBC Television Service. The first edition was broadcast on 3 November 1936, the day after the service officially began, and it continued to be broadcast until the suspension of television for the duration of the Second World War during 1939. Following the resumption of BBC television during 1946, Starlight was one of the few pre-war programmes to be reinstated, and it was broadcast for a further three years until 1949.

A variety show, the programmes would feature comedians, singers, dancers and various other entertainment acts. One notable edition of the 1930s gave popular singer Gracie Fields her first television appearance.

As with all other BBC programmes of the time, Starlight was transmitted live from the studios at Alexandra Palace. The shows were not recorded, and no material other than still photographs exists for the series now.

== Episodes ==
1. Bebe Daniels and Ben Lyon (3rd November 1936)
2. Manuela Del Rio (3rd November 1936)
