= 1944 in television =

The year 1944 in television involved some significant events. Below is a list of television-related events during 1944.

== Events ==
- May 22 – The US Federal Communications Commission (FCC) increases its limits for single ownership of television stations from three to five.
- May 25 – First commercial U.S. telecast by relay. Eddie Cantor is broadcast from NBC's Manhattan station WNBT to Philco's Philadelphia station WPTZ, via an automatic relay tower halfway between the two cities. (The AT&T corporation's coaxial cable between the cities is unavailable because of the war.) NBC stops broadcasting Cantor in the middle of his rendition of the song "We're Having a Baby, My Baby and Me" when it finds some of the lyrics and his gestures "objectionable."
- August 16
  - Paris télévision – Fernsehsender Paris stops broadcasting. Broadcasting is resumed by the new French government in October 1944 under the name Télévision française with the same technical equipment.
  - John Logie Baird demonstrates the world's first color television picture tube. Color movies are shown from a flying-spot scanner.

== Debuts ==
- The War As It Happens, an early news show debuts (1944–1945)
- At Home, variety series (1944–1945)
- Missus Goes a Shopping, a game series, premieres (1944–1949)
- The World in Your Home, an educational series, (1944–1948)
- Opinions on Trial, a discussion series (1944-1945?)
- Will You Remember?, a music series (1944–1945)

== Television shows ==
| Series | Debut | Ended | Network |
|---|---|---|---|
| The War As It Happens | February 21, 1944 | 1945 | |
| Missus Goes a Shopping | August 1, 1944 | 1949 | CBS |
| The World in Your Home | 1944 | 1948 | NBC |
| Will You Remember? | 1944 | 1945? | CBS |
| Opinions on Trial | 1944 | 1945? | |
| At Home | 1944 | 1945 | CBS |

== Births ==
- January 4 - Jim Bohannon, broadcaster (died 2022)
- January 6 - Bonnie Franklin, actress and director, One Day at a Time (died 2013)
- January 10 - William Sanderson, actor, Newhart, Deadwood, True Blood
- January 19 - Shelley Fabares, actress and singer, The Donna Reed Show, Coach
- January 21 - Keith Strachan, composer
- January 23 - Rutger Hauer, Dutch actor (died 2019)
- January 28 - Susan Howard, American actress
- February 3 - Trisha Noble, Australian singer and actress (died 2021)
- February 8
  - Roger Lloyd-Pack, English actor (died 2014)
  - Richard Durden, English actor
- February 13
  - Stockard Channing, actress, The West Wing
  - Michael Ensign, American actor
  - Jerry Springer, American television-judge, broadcaster, journalist, actor, producer, and former lawyer and politician (died 2023)
- February 17 - Nick Hewer, English television presenter
- February 22 - Robert Kardashian, lawyer and patriarch of the Kardashian family (died 2003)
- February 28 - Kelly Bishop, actress, Gilmore Girls
- February 29
  - Sharon Hugueny, actress (died 1996)
  - Dennis Farina, actor, Crime Story, Law & Order (died 2013)
  - Phyllis Frelich, actress (died 2014)
- March 3 - Lee Holdridge, composer
- March 10 - Richard Gant, actor
- March 17 - Petra Markham, actress
- March 22 - Michael Zinberg, writer
- March 24 - R. Lee Ermey, actor and drill instructor (died 2018)
- March 26 - Diana Ross, singer and actress
- March 28 - Ken Howard, actor, The White Shadow (died 2016)
- April 1 - Frank Gari, singer
- April 3 - Tony Orlando, singer
- April 4 - Craig T. Nelson, actor, Coach, The District, Parenthood
- April 6 - Judith McConnell, actress
- April 7
  - oshik levi, Israeli singer and actor
  - Warner Fusselle, sportscaster (died 2012)
- April 8 - Hywel Bennett, Welsh actor, Shelley (died 2017)
- April 10 - Vin Di Bona, producer
- April 20 - Cuba Gooding Sr., singer (died 2017)
- April 25 - Len Goodman, English professional, Dancing with the Stars (died 2023)
- April 29
  - Richard Kline, actor and director, Three's Company
  - Michael Angelis, actor (died 2020)
- April 30 - Jill Clayburgh, actress (died 2010)
- May 5 - John Rhys-Davies, Welsh actor, Sliders
- May 14 - George Lucas, director and producer
- May 16 - Danny Trejo, actor
- May 23 - Ronald L. Schwary, producer (died 2020)
- May 24 - Patti LaBelle, singer and actress
- May 25
  - Frank Oz, actor and puppeteer
  - John Bunnell, host
- May 28 - Patricia Quinn, actress
- June 2 - Marvin Hamlisch, composer (died 2012)
- June 4 - Michelle Phillips, singer and actress
- June 20 - John McCook, actor, The Bold and the Beautiful
- June 21 - Tony Scott, actor (died 2012)
- June 25 - Gary David Goldberg, producer (died 2013)
- June 29 - Gary Busey, actor
- June 30 - Terry Funk, actor (died 2023)
- July 8
  - Jeffrey Tambor, actor, The Larry Sanders Show, Arrested Development, Transparent
  - Janet Sheen, actress
- July 12 - Denise Nicholas, actress, Room 222, In the Heat of the Night
- July 15 - Jan-Michael Vincent, actor, Airwolf (died 2019)
- July 22 - Peter Jason, actor
- July 31 - Geraldine Chaplin, actress
- August 1 - Christopher Lewis, screenwriter (died 2021)
- August 4 - Richard Belzer, actor, Homicide: Life on the Street, Law & Order: Special Victims Unit (died 2023)
- August 7
  - John Glover, actor, Smallville
  - David Rasche, actor, Sledge Hammer!
- August 8 - Brooke Bundy, actress
- August 9 - Sam Elliott, actor
- August 11 - Ian McDiarmid, Scottish actor
- August 13 - Kevin Tighe, actor, Emergency!
- August 21 - Susan Heinkel, child star of Susan's Show
- August 25 - Anthony Heald, actor, Boston Public
- August 27
  - Barbara Trentham, actress (died 2013)
  - G. W. Bailey, actor
- August 30 - Molly Ivins, author (died 2007)
- September 1 - Beau Starr, actor
- September 6 - Swoosie Kurtz, actress, Sisters
- September 13 - Jacqueline Bisset, English actress
- September 16 - Linda Kaye Henning, actress, Petticoat Junction
- September 21 - Fannie Flagg, actress, Match Game
- September 25
  - Michael Douglas, actor, producer, The Streets of San Francisco
  - Eugenia Zukerman, American flutist
- September 26 - Anne Robinson, presenter
- September 27
  - Angélica María, actress
  - Steven Robman, American television and theatre director/producer
- September 28 - Matthew Cowles, actor
- September 29 - Mike Post, composer
- October 1 - Philip Hinchcliffe, British producer.
- October 15 - Haim Saban, American composer
- October 28
  - Dennis Franz, actor, NYPD Blue
  - Alyce Cleese, talk show host
- November 1 - Bobby Heenan, pro wrestler and commentator (died 2017)
- November 2 - Michael Buffer, ring announcer
- November 4 - Linda Gary, American actress, voice actress, Spider-Man (died 1995)
- November 12 - Al Michaels, sportscaster
- November 16 - Jay Hammer, actor, Guiding Light
- November 17
  - Danny DeVito, actor, director and producer, Taxi, It's Always Sunny in Philadelphia
  - Lorne Michaels, screenwriter
  - Gary Goldman, screenwriter
- November 20 - John Pasquin, television director
- November 21
  - Harold Ramis, actor (died 2014)
  - Marcy Carsey, American television producer
- November 25 - Ben Stein, television actor
- November 27 - Gregory Hoblit, television director
- December 2 - Cathy Lee Crosby, actress and host, That's Incredible!
- December 6 - Kit Culkin, actor
- December 11
  - Teri Garr, actress
  - Lynda Day George, actress, Mission: Impossible
  - Susan Blanchard, actress, All My Children
- December 17 - Bernard Hill, English actor (died 2024)
- December 19 - Tim Reid, actor, Sister, Sister
- December 31 - Neil Ross, voice actor
