= Pat Hogan =

American actor

- Born: Thurman Lee Haas; February 3, 1920; Oklahoma, U.S.
- Died: November 21, 1966 (aged 46); Los Angeles, California, U.S.
- Occupation: Actor
- Years active: 1951–1965
- Spouses: Jacquelyn Gibson; Nancy Scott
- Children: 3

Pat Hogan (born Thurman Lee Haas; February 3, 1920 – November 21, 1966) was an American actor. He mostly played Native Americans over the course of his career. He portrayed Chief Red Stick in the film Davy Crockett: King of the Wild Frontier (1955).

== Career ==
Born in Oklahoma to Claude Red Elk and Ann McTigue, Hogan was a member of the Oneida tribe. He attended Roosevelt High School in St. Louis and Pasadena Junior College, where he studied art.

He appeared in many western television series and a few movies. Onstage, he starred in Arrowhead (1953), The Last Frontier (1955), Indian Paint (1965). Indian Paint starred his brothers-in-law, Johnny Crawford and Robert L. "Bobby" Crawford Jr. He was married to their sister, who now goes by the name of Nance Crawford. She was listed in his obituary as Nancy Scott. Three children survive, including Shawna, Brian, and Kathie.

Hogan debuted on film in Fix Bayonets (1952).

In 1954, Hogan portrayed Chief Red Stick in Walt Disney's "Davy Crockett, Indian Fighter" starring Fess Parker. In 1955, at 34, Hogan played the role of 20-year-old Crawford Goldsby, or the outlaw Cherokee Bill, in the syndicated television series, Stories of the Century, starring and narrated by Jim Davis. Hogan then portrayed Black Cloud in the CBS series Brave Eagle (1955–56) starring Keith Larsen in the title role. He played Sam Peachpit in the syndicated Casey Jones (1957) and Rivas in the NBC adventure series Northwest Passage (1958).

In the 1950s and 1960s, he guest-starred in such programs as The Rifleman, Gunsmoke, Broken Arrow, Crossroads, Zorro, Daniel Boone and Texas John Slaughter. His last appearance was in the film Indian Paint (1965) with Jay Silverheels.

In the mid-1950s, Hogan was married to dancer Jacquelyn Gibson.

== Death ==
He died from lung cancer on November 21, 1966, in Los Angeles, California.

== Filmography ==
Year	Title	Role	Notes
1944	Atlantic City		
1951	Fixed Bayonets!	Jonesy	Uncredited
1952	The Return of Gilbert & Sullivan		Short
1952	Lure of the Wilderness	Harry Longden	Uncredited
1952	Yankee Buccaneer	Seaman	Uncredited
1953	Pony Express	Chief Yellow Hand	Uncredited
1953	Arrowhead	Jim Eagle	
1953	Gun Fury	Johash	Uncredited
1953	Back to God's Country	Uppy	
1953	The Nebraskan	Yellow Knife	
1954	Overland Pacific	Dark Thunder	
1954	Man with the Steel Whip	Indian Chief	Serial, [Chs. 1, 2, 7]
1954	Sign of the Pagan	Sangiban	
1955	Smoke Signal	Delche	
1955	Chief Crazy Horse	Dull Knife	
1955	Davy Crockett, King of the Wild Frontier	Chief Red Stick	(archive footage)
1955	Kiss of Fire	Chief Pahvant	
1955	The Last Frontier	Mungo	
1955-1956	Brave Eagle	Black Cloud	19 epsidoes
1956	Secret of Treasure Mountain	Vahoe	
1956	Pillars of the Sky	Jacob	
1956	7th Cavalry	Young Hawk	
1960	Ten Who Dared	Indian chief	Uncredited
1960	North to Alaska	Miner / Saloon Brawler	Uncredited
1960	Flaming Star	Indian Warrior #2	Uncredited
1962	Hemingway's Adventures of a Young Man	Billy Tabeshaw	Uncredited
1963	Savage Sam	Broken Nose	
1965	Indian Paint	Sutamakis	(final film role)
