= Alfred Eugene Megerlin =

Violinist with New York Philharmonic (1880–1941)

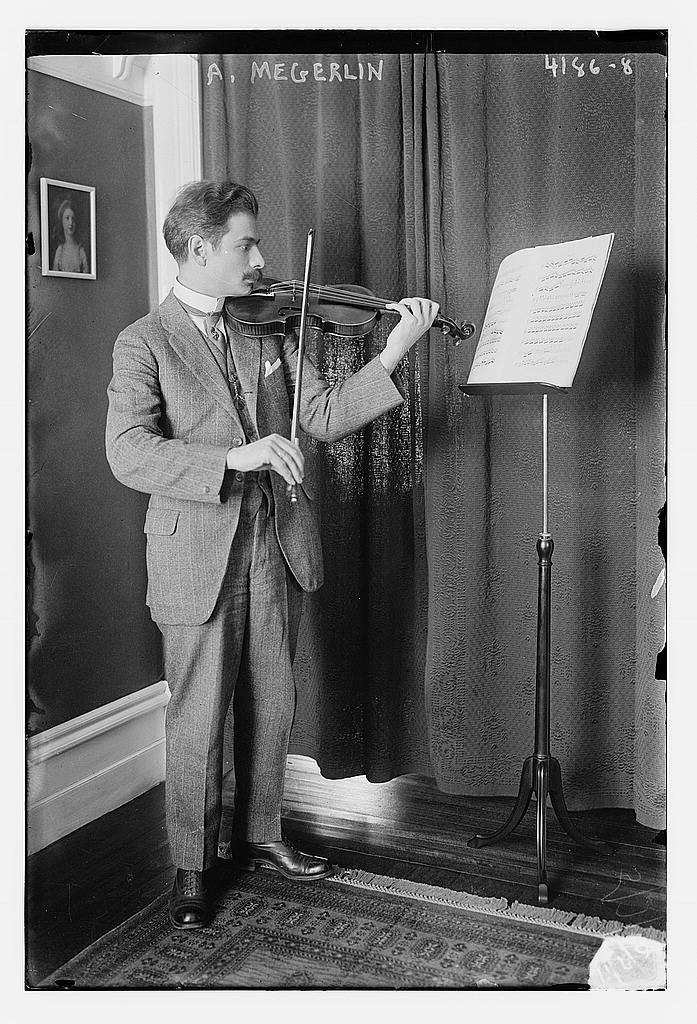
Alfred Eugene Megerlin in 1917

Alfred Eugene Megerlin (June 30, 1880 – February 22, 1941) was a violinist. He was the concertmaster and first violinist of the New York Philharmonic.

== Biography ==
Megerlin was born in Antwerp, Belgium and trained at the Royal Conservatory of Brussels where he graduated in 1900. He became the concertmaster at the Vlaamse Opera and played with the Orchestre Lamoureux. In 1917 he became the concertmaster and first violinist of the New York Philharmonic under Josef Stránský when he replaced Maximilian Pilzer.

== Personal life ==
Megerlin is the maternal grandfather of actor Johnny Crawford, who played Mark McCain on the television show The Rifleman. Megerlin died in Los Angeles in 1941.
