= Susan Cummings (actress) =

German-American actress (1930–2016)

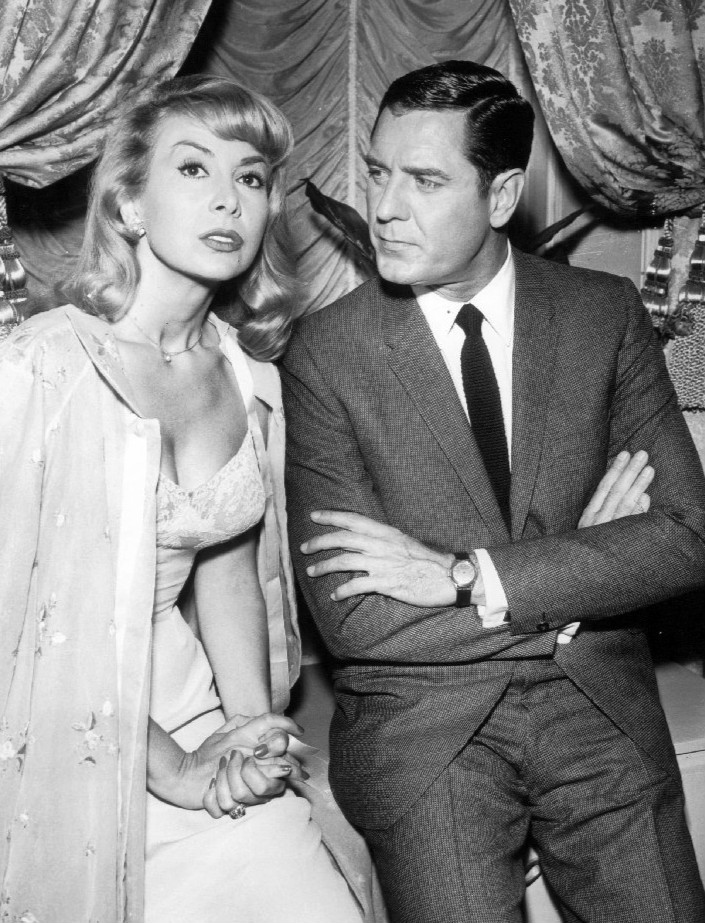
- Susan Cummings with Craig Stevens on Peter Gunn (1960)
- Born: Gerda Susanne Tafel; July 10, 1930; Bavaria, Germany
- Died: December 3, 2016 (aged 86); Chandler, Arizona, U.S.
- Occupation: Actress
- Years active: 1944-1974
- Spouse(s): Wayne Dunafon (m. 194?; div. 19??) Keith Larsen (m. 1953; div. 1960) Charles T. Pawley (m. 1962; died 1975) Robert E. Strasser (m. 1976)
- Children: 1

Susan Cummings (née Gerda Susanne Tafel; July 10, 1930 – December 3, 2016) was a German-American actress active from the 1940s to 1960s who started as a teenager in the earliest days of commercial television and appeared in television shows, feature films and on Broadway. Her birth surname of Tafel was sometimes printed as Ta Fel.

== Early years ==
Born Gerda Susanne Tafel in Bavaria, Germany, she immigrated to the United States at age 7 on March 12, 1938, shortly before the outbreak of World War II. The daughter of Mr. and Mrs. Eugene Tafel, she was raised in Newark, New Jersey, where her father ran a bakery.

== Career ==
Cummings (billed as Suzanne Tafel) was a teenager when she became a regular on the American television variety series At Home, which aired on New York City station WCBW (now WCBS-TV) from 1944 to 1945 in the earliest years of commercial television. She first appeared in Broadway theatre in 1945, portraying Susan Peters in Carousel.

During the 1958–59 season, Cummings portrayed Georgia, proprietress of the Golden Nugget Saloon, in the syndicated Western television series Union Pacific.

She made two guest appearances on Perry Mason: one as Lois Fenton in the title role in the 1957 episode "The Case of the Fan Dancer's Horse" and as Margaret Swaine in the 1959 episode "The Case of the Lame Canary".

In 1960, she appeared as Stella Carney, a love interest of Marshal Dillon, in an episode of the television Western series Gunsmoke. She appeared as Patty in a 1962 episode of The Twilight Zone titled "To Serve Man". In February 1964, she appeared in an episode of the TV series McHale's Navy.

== Personal life ==
In the late 1940s, Cummings was married to rodeo performer Wayne Dunafon. She married actor Keith Larsen on December 28, 1953, in Ensenada, Mexico. She was also married to actor Charles T. Pawley and accountant Robert E. Strasser.

Cummings died on December 3, 2016.

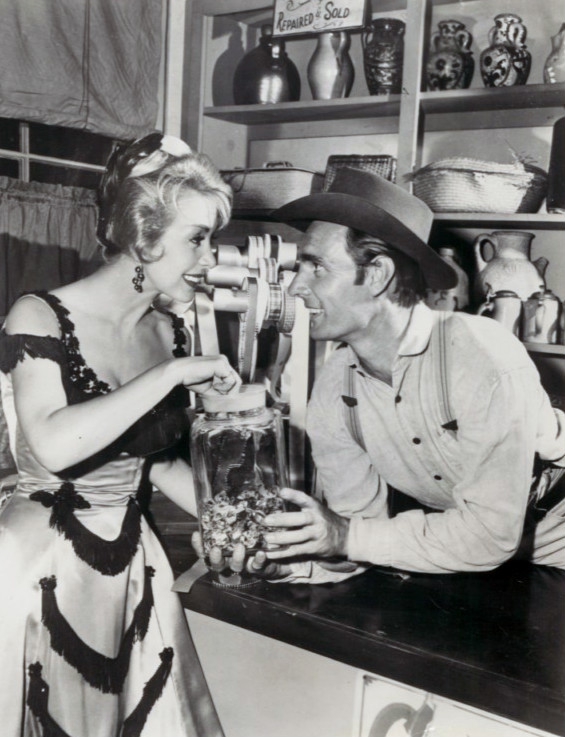
With Dennis Weaver in Gunsmoke, 1960

== Filmography ==
Film
Year	Title	Role	Notes	
1946	Merrily We Sing	Suzanne	Short	
1951	An American in Paris	Patron at Flodair Café	Uncredited	
1954	Security Risk	Joan Cochran		
1955	Headline Hunters	Elsa - Receptionist	Uncredited	
1956	Swamp Women	Marie		
1956	Secret of Treasure Mountain	Tawana		
1957	Utah Blaine	Angie Kinyon		
1957	Tomahawk Trail	Ellen Carter		
1958	Man from God's Country	Mary Jo Ellis		
1959	Verboten!	Helga Schiller / Brent		
1966	The Street Is My Beat	Cora		
1974	A Time For Love	Woman	(final film role)	
2003	Images of Indians: How Hollywood Stereotyped the Native American	Herself / Ellen Carter (archival footage)	TV movie documentary	
2019	The Twilight Zone: A 60th Anniversary Celebration	Herself / Patty (archival footage)	TV movie documentary	(released posthumously)
Television
Year	Title	Role	Notes	
1944–45	At Home	herself	early variety show	
1955–57	Soldiers of Fortune	Simone LeBeau / Pilar	2 episodes	
1955–60	The Millionaire	Virginia 'Ginny' Hendricks / Claire	2 episodes	
1956	Science Fiction Theater	Ellen Barton / Peggy Kendler	2 episodes	
1957	The Frank Sinatra Show	Miss Douglas	1 episode	
1957–59	Perry Mason	Margaret Swaine / Lois Fenton	2 episodes	
1958–59	Union Pacific	Georgia	33 episodes	
1958–60	Bat Masterson	Rona Glyn / Lili Napoleon / Valorie Mitchell	3 episodes	
1959	Man with a Camera	Monique Thaxter	Episode: "The Positive Negative"	
1959	The Dennis O'Keefe Show	Babette Benoit	Episode: "The Marriage of Babette Benoit"	
1960	The Untouchables	Hazel Stanley	Episode: "Little Egypt"	
1960	Gunsmoke	Stella Carney	Episode: "The Peace Offer"	
1960	Peter Gunn	Paula Garrett	Episode: "The Long Green Kill"	
1960	Lock-Up	Janet Collins Baron	Episode: "The Frame Up"	
1961	Laramie	Holly	Episode: "Rimrock"	
1961	Checkmate	Countess Johanna	Episode: "A Slight Touch of Venom"	
1961	Cheyenne	Helen Ransom	Episode: "Winchester Quarantine"	
1961	Riverboat	Tekla Kronen	Episode: "End of a Dream"	
1962	The Twilight Zone	Patty	Episode: "To Serve Man"	
1964	McHale's Navy	Renee	Episode: "The Big Impersonation"	
