= Belle Starr (disambiguation) =

Belle Starr was an American outlaw who gained national notoriety after her violent death.

- Belle Starr (1941 film), American Western film directed by Irving Cummings
- Belle Starr (1980 film), American television movie about Starr starring Elizabeth Montgomery

== See also ==
- The Belle Stars, an all female British pop/rock band formed in 1980
- Belle Starr's Daughter, a 1948 American Western film directed by Lesley Selander
- The Belle Starr Story, a 1968 Italian made episodic Bonnie and Clyde type Spaghetti Western
- Son of Belle Starr, a 1953 American Western film directed by Frank McDonald
