= Indian Paint (film) =

1965 film

- Directed by: Norman Foster
- Written by: Glenn Balch (novel); Norman Foster
- Produced by: Robert L. Callahan; Robert Crawford; Gene Goree; Jay Richards; James A. Sullivan
- Starring: Johnny Crawford; Jay Silverheels; Robert L. Crawford Jr.
- Cinematography: Floyd Crosby
- Edited by: George White
- Music by: Marlin Skiles
- Production company: Eagle American
- Distributed by: Crown International Pictures
- Release date: April 8, 1965
- Running time: 91 minutes
- Country: United States
- Language: English
- Budget: $300,000

Indian Paint is a 1965 American Western film directed by Norman Foster and starring Johnny Crawford, Jay Silverheels and Pat Hogan.

== Plot ==
Set before the arrival of Europeans in North America, the story centers on Nishko, a chief's son in the Great Plains. During his rite of passage, Nishko is determined to tame a painted pony as an indication of his emerging manhood.

== Cast ==
- Johnny Crawford as Nishko
- Jay Silverheels as Chief Hevatanu
- Robert L. Crawford Jr. as Wacopi
- Pat Hogan as Sutamakis
- George J. Lewis as Nopawallo
- Joan Hallmark as Amatula
- Cinda Siler as Petala
- Bill Blackwell as Sutako
- Al Doney as Latoso
- Marshall Jones as Comanche leader
- Suzanne Goodman as Widow of Latoso
- Warren L. Dodge as Second Comanche

== Bibliography ==
- Angela Aleiss. Making the White Man's Indian: Native Americans and Hollywood Movies. Greenwood Publishing Group, 2005.
