= Vera Miles =

American actress (born 1930)

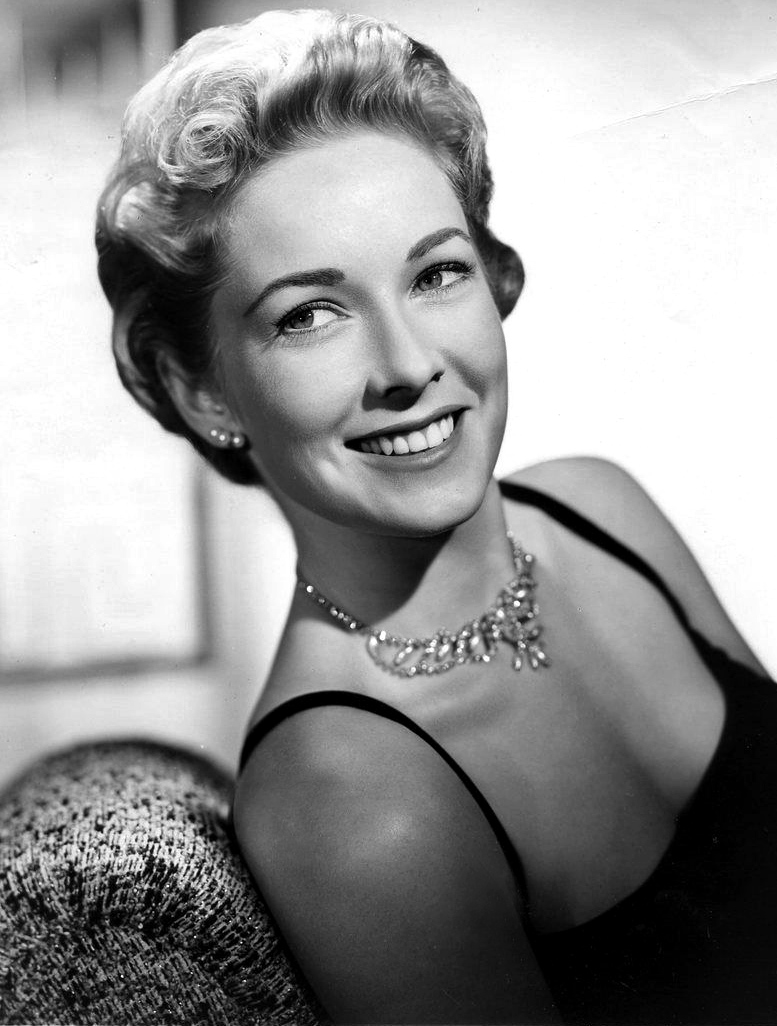
- Miles in 1959
- Born: Vera June Ralston; August 23, 1930 (age 96); Boise City, Oklahoma, U.S.
- Occupation: Actress
- Years active: 1950–1995
- Spouses: Bob Miles (m. 1948; div. 1954) Gordon Scott (m. 1956; div. 1960) Keith Larsen (m. 1960; div. 1971) Robert Jones (m. 1973; div. 1975)
- Children: 4

Vera June Miles (née Ralston; born August 23, 1930) is an American former actress. She is known for appearing in John Ford's Western films The Searchers (1956) and The Man Who Shot Liberty Valance (1962), and for playing Lila Crane in Alfred Hitchcock's Psycho (1960) and Richard Franklin's sequel Psycho II (1983).

Miles's other film credits include Tarzan's Hidden Jungle (1955), The Wrong Man (1956), A Touch of Larceny (1959), Follow Me, Boys! (1966), Hellfighters (1968), Sergeant Ryker (1968), and Molly and Lawless John (1972).

== Early life ==
Vera June Ralston was born in Boise City, Oklahoma, on August 23, 1930. She grew up first in Pratt, Kansas, and later lived in Wichita, where she worked nights as a Western Union operator-typist and graduated from Wichita North High School in 1948. She was crowned Miss Kansas in 1948 and was the third runner-up in the Miss America contest.

== Career ==
Miles moved to Los Angeles in 1948 and landed small roles in television and film, including a minor role as a chorus girl in Two Tickets to Broadway (1951), a musical starring Janet Leigh, with whom Miles would co-star nine years later in the classic Alfred Hitchcock film Psycho. She used her first husband's name, Miles, because there already was a Vera Ralston film actress. Miles eventually was put under contract at various studios. She once recalled, "I was dropped by the best studios in town."

Miles's first credited film appearance was in The Rose Bowl Story (1952), a romantic comedy in which she played a Tournament of Roses queen. Suzanne Finstad wrote in Natasha: The Biography of Natalie Wood about Miles's experience in the movie:

The star of the movie, as Natalie’s older sister, was a complete unknown named Vera Miles, a former Miss Texas “so doggone scared on her first picture, doing a big part, she was eager and willing to do anything,” remembers Doran. “Poor little Vera Miles had a scene where she had to wear a coat and she couldn’t afford to buy one. She and her husband were living on beans and rice and she was so pleased to have a job. And I loaned her my coat, since we had to furnish our own clothes, and Natalie looked at me and she said, ‘You mean you’re gonna let her wear your coat?’ And I said, ‘Of course. Because she doesn’t have a coat.’ Natalie understood immediately. She whispered, ‘Oh…that’s different.’

While under contract to Warner Bros., Miles was cast alongside her future husband Gordon Scott in the 1955 film Tarzan's Hidden Jungle as Tarzan's love interest. The following year, she was cast by director John Ford as Jeffrey Hunter's love interest in the John Wayne Western The Searchers (1956), and appeared in the movies Wichita, directed by Jacques Tourneur and 23 Paces to Baker Street with Van Johnson. Also in 1956, Miles starred as Rose Balestrero, the fragile wife of Manny Balestrero, a musician falsely accused of a crime and played by Henry Fonda, in the film The Wrong Man. The movie was directed by Alfred Hitchcock, and is one of only a few Hitchcock films based on real-life events.

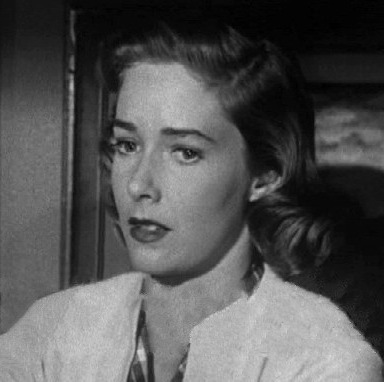
Miles in The Wrong Man (1957)

Signing a five-year personal contract with Hitchcock in 1957, Miles was widely publicized as the director's potential successor to Grace Kelly. Two years prior, Hitchcock had directed Miles in the role of Ralph Meeker's emotionally troubled new bride in "Revenge", the pilot episode of his television series Alfred Hitchcock Presents.

Vertigo (1958), a project Hitchcock designed as a showcase for his new star, was met with production delays. Miles's subsequent pregnancy would cost her the lead role, which eventually went to Kim Novak. Vertigo (which also starred James Stewart) was not a financial or critical success at the time, with Hitchcock claiming that Novak was miscast. Despite Hitchcock's disappointment regarding Vertigo, he continued to work with Miles, eventually casting her in what is arguably the role for which she is most remembered, that of Lila Crane in Psycho. In the film, she portrayed the determined sister of the doomed motel guest Marion Crane (Janet Leigh), who teams up with Marion's boyfriend and a private investigator to find her. After Pat Hitchcock's death in 2021, Miles became the last surviving cast member of the film. She later appeared in two episodes of The Alfred Hitchcock Hour (in 1962 and 1965).

In 1962, Miles reunited with director John Ford for the film The Man Who Shot Liberty Valance. Starring alongside her former co-star from The Searchers, John Wayne, she is courted by both Wayne and James Stewart, two very different men competing for her hand in marriage.

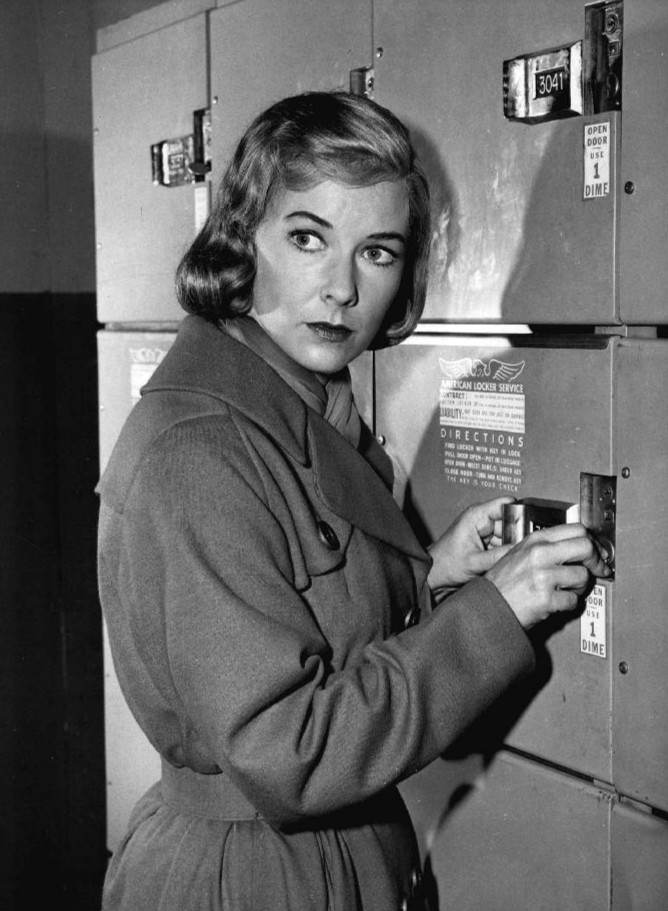
Miles in The Twilight Zone, 1960

In addition to her film appearances, Miles was featured in many popular television shows throughout her career, including Gunsmoke, Wagon Train, Laramie, The Twilight Zone, and the Western series Riverboat, starring Darren McGavin and Burt Reynolds. She co-starred in the first episode of ABC's The Fugitive (titled "Fear in a Desert City") and guest-starred in episodes of The Outer Limits, Burke's Law, The Eleventh Hour, The Man from U.N.C.L.E., and Ironside.

In 1965, Miles had a supporting role in three episodes of the CBS series My Three Sons. The same year, she co-starred with lead actors Robert Culp and Bill Cosby in the pilot episode of the TV series I Spy entitled "Affair in T'Sien Cha" (although the pilot was not actually broadcast until midway through the series' first season).

Other notable films in which Miles appeared included the Walt Disney film Follow Me, Boys! (1966) with Fred MacMurray. In Hellfighters (1968), she played Katharine Ross's mother, although she is only nine years Ross's senior. The film also reunited her with John Wayne. Miles had filmed scenes with Wayne for the movie The Green Berets (also 1968), playing Wayne's character's wife. However, with Warner Bros. wanting more action in the film, her scenes were cut.

Miles continued to appear in numerous TV films and TV series during the 1970s, including the pilot for the TV series Cannon (broadcast in March 1971) as the wife of a deceased war comrade of private investigator Frank Cannon's, played by William Conrad. Miles also appeared on the pilot of Hollywood Squares in 1966. She guest-starred in a further two episodes of the series in different roles during its run. In 1973, she appeared alongside Peter Falk in "Lovely but Lethal", an episode of NBC's Columbo, playing a cosmetics queen who commits murder. She also made guest appearances in episodes of Hawaii Five-O, The Streets of San Francisco, and Fantasy Island.

In 1983, more than 20 years after Psycho, Miles reprised the role of Lila Crane in Psycho II, joining Anthony Perkins in the sequel. Miles and Perkins were the only stars of the original film to appear in this second installment. Miles continued to appear in a number of TV and film productions during the 1980s, with appearances in the movies The Initiation (1984) and Into the Night (1985), and guest-starring in episodes of the TV series The Love Boat (1982 and 1984) and Hotel (1984 and 1987). She appeared in three episodes of Murder, She Wrote (broadcast in 1985, 1990, and 1991). The 1991 episode, titled "Thursday's Child", was her final television role. Her last acting role was in the film Separate Lives (1995). She then retired from the industry.

== Personal life ==
Miles has been married four times. Her first husband was stuntman and actor Bob Miles. They were married from 1948 to 1954, and had two daughters, Debra and Kelley. Bob Miles was stunt-coordinator on Bonanza from the series' inception in 1959, taught Michael Landon how to perform stunts, and doubled Landon when the athletic actor was not doing his own fight scenes. Her second husband was actor and bodybuilder Gordon Scott, her co-star in Tarzan's Hidden Jungle. They were married from 1956 to 1960 and had one son, Michael. Her third husband was actor Keith Larsen. They were married from 1960 to 1971 and had one son, Erik. Her fourth marriage was to filmmaker Robert Jones. They were married from 1973 to 1975.

One of her grandsons, actor Jordan Essoe, met with actress Jessica Biel in 2012 in preparation for Biel's portrayal of Miles in the film Hitchcock.

Miles is a member of the Church of Jesus Christ of Latter-day Saints. She also has been a frequent visitor to Salt Lake City, Utah, was greatly involved in the Boy Scouts of America, and is a member of the Hollywood California Stake.

== Filmography ==
=== Film ===
Year	Title	Role	Notes
1950	When Willie Comes Marching Home	Laughing Sergeant's date	Uncredited
1951	Two Tickets to Broadway	Showgirl	Uncredited
1952	For Men Only	Kathy Hughes	
1952	The Rose Bowl Story	Denny Burke	
1953	The Beast from 20,000 Fathoms	Trailer Commentator	Uncredited
1953	The Charge at Feather River	Jennie McKeever	
1953	So Big	Schoolgirl	Uncredited
1954	Pride of the Blue Grass	Linda	a.k.a. Prince of the Blue Grass
1955	Tarzan's Hidden Jungle	Jill Hardy	
1955	Wichita	Laurie McCoy	
1956	The Searchers	Laurie Jorgensen	
1956	23 Paces to Baker Street	Jean Lennox	
1956	Autumn Leaves	Virginia Hanson	
1956	The Wrong Man	Rose Balestrero	
1957	Beau James	Betty Compton	
1959	Web of Evidence	Lena Anderson	a.k.a. Beyond This Place
1959	The FBI Story	Lucy Ann Hardesty	
1959	A Touch of Larceny	Virginia Killain	
1960	Five Branded Women	Daniza	
1960	Psycho	Lila Crane	
1961	The Lawbreakers	Angela Walsh	
1961	Back Street	Liz Saxon	
1962	The Man Who Shot Liberty Valance	Hallie Stoddard	
1964	A Tiger Walks	Dorothy Williams	
1965	Those Calloways	Lydia "Liddy" Calloway	
1966	One of Our Spies Is Missing	Madame Raine De Sala	
1966	Follow Me, Boys!	Vida Downey	
1967	The Spirit Is Willing	Kate Powell	
1967	Gentle Giant	Ellen Wedloe	
1968	Sergeant Ryker	Ann Ryker	
1968	Kona Coast	Melissa Hyde	
1968	The Green Berets	Mrs. Lee Kirby	Scenes deleted
1968	Mission Batangas	Joan Barnes	
1968	Hellfighters	Madelyn Buckman	
1969	It Takes All Kinds	Laura Ring	
1970	The Wild Country	Kate Tanner	
1972	Molly and Lawless John	Molly Parker	
1973	One Little Indian	Doris McIver	
1974	The Castaway Cowboy	Henrietta MacAvoy	
1977	Run for the Roses	Clarissa Stewart	a.k.a. The Thoroughbreds
1982	BrainWaves	Marian Koonan	
1983	Psycho II	Lila Loomis	
1984	The Initiation	Frances Fairchild	
1985	Into the Night	Joan Caper	
1995	Separate Lives	Dr. Ruth Goldin	

=== Television ===
Year	Title	Role	Notes
1950	One Hour in Wonderland	Coca-Cola Girl (uncredited)	
1951	Fireside Theatre		Episode: "The Seven Graces"
1953–1958	Schlitz Playhouse of Stars	Sarah Larkin / Julie	4 episodes
1954	Crown Theatre with Gloria Swanson	Lois Wheeler	Episode: "This Day Is Yours"
1954	Lux Video Theatre	Herself - Intermission Guest	2 episodes
1954	Hallmark Hall of Fame		Episode: "The Immortal Oath"
1954	Four Star Playhouse	Julie Tolin / Maggie	2 episodes
1954	Medic	Jane Agnes Caldwell	Episode: "The Wild Intruder"
1954–1955	The Pepsi-Cola Playhouse	Daughter / Nancy	3 episodes
1954–1955	Ford Television Theatre	Angela / Nancy Carr	2 episodes
1954–1957	Lux Video Theatre	Jenny / Christine Carroll Kimberly / Audrey O'Connor / Maureen O'Reilly	4 episodes
1954–1958	Climax!	Janet Reese / Jan Michaels / Sally Jordan	4 episodes
1954–1960	General Electric Theater	Debra Stone / Nora Douglas / Mrs. Eaton / Terry	5 episodes
1955	City Detective	Carol Martin	Episode: "Goodbye Old Paint"
1955	Science Fiction Theatre	Dr. Jan Corey	Episode: "No Food for Thought"
1955	The Millionaire	Merle Roberts	Episode: "The Merle Roberts Story"
1955	Alfred Hitchcock Presents	Elsa Spann	Season 1 Episode 1: "Revenge"
1955	Screen Directors Playhouse	Ruth Dahlberg	Episode: "Rookie of the Year"
1955	The 20th Century Fox Hour	Virginia	Episode: "Man on the Ledge"
1956	Strange Stories	Susan Harris	Episode: "Such a Nice Little Girl"
1956	G.E. Summer Originals		Episode: "The Great Lady"
1957	Playhouse 90	Carolyn Cook	Episode: "Panic Button"
1958	Studio 57	The Little Girl's Mother	Episode: "Emergency Call"
1958	Colgate Theatre	Judy Gregory	Episode: "Mr. Tutt" (or "Strange Counsel")
1959	Riverboat	Jeanette Mowbray	Episode: "About Roger Mowbray"
1959	Rawhide	Helen Walsh	Episode: "Incident at the Buffalo Smokehouse"
1959–1965	Wagon Train	Anne Reed / Janice Stuart / Sister Rita	3 episodes
1960	Dick Powell's Zane Grey Theatre	Jenny Breckenridge	Episode: "Miss Jenny"
1960	The Twilight Zone	Millicent Barnes	Episode: "Mirror Image"
1960	Startime	Jean Medwick	Episode: "Incident at a Corner"
1960	Laramie	Anne Andrews	Episode: "Three Rode West"
1961	The Asphalt Jungle	Angela Walsh	Episode: "The Lady and the Lawyer"
1961	Frontier Circus	Maureen McBride	Episode: "Lippizan"
1961	Checkmate	Zoe Kamens	Episode: "The Crimson Pool"
1962	The Detectives	Lucy	2 episodes
1962	Sam Benedict	Midge Maddon	Episode: "Maddon's Folly"
1962	Route 66	Ellen Barnes	Episode: "Where Is Chick Lorimer, Where Has She Gone?"
1962	The Dick Powell Show	Stella Calman	Episode: "Crazy Sunday"
1962	The Alfred Hitchcock Hour	Daphne	Season 1 Episode 2: "Don't Look Behind You"
1962–1963	The Eleventh Hour	Kate Sommers / Ann Costigan	2 episodes
1963	The Fugitive	Monica Welles	Episode: "Fear in a Desert City"
1963	Arrest and Trial	Jean Forbes	Episode: "Isn't It a Lovely View"
1963	Kraft Suspense Theatre	Ann Ryker	2 episodes
1963	The Fugitive	Monica Welles	Television film
1963–1970	The Virginian	Amelia Ballard / Maggie Menken / Miss Wallace	3 episodes
1963–1970	Insight	Lucy / Mme Bernice / Sister Lucy Anne / Marion / Maria	5 episodes
1964	The Unknown	Kassia Paine	Television film
1964	The Outer Limits	Kasha Paine	Episode: "The Forms of Things Unknown"
1964	Bob Hope Presents the Chrysler Theatre	Beth	Episode: "The Sojourner"
1964	Burke's Law	Claudia Sutton	Episode: "Who Killed the Horne of Plenty?"
1964	The Hanged Man	Lois Seeger	Television film
1965	Slattery's People	Lucy Hampton	Episode: "Question: How Long Is the Shadow of a Man?"
1965	Mr. Novak	Sister Gervaise	Episode: "There's a Penguin in My Garden"
1965	My Three Sons	Ernestine Coulter	3 episodes
1965	I Spy	Rachel	Episode: "Affair in T'Sien Cha"
1965	The Alfred Hitchcock Hour	Nicky Revere / Monica Parrish	Season 3 Episode 20: "Death Scene"
1966	The Man from U.N.C.L.E.	Madame Raine De Sala	2 episodes
1966	ABC Stage 67	Adele	Episode: "The People Trap"
1966–1971	Bonanza	Mrs. April Christopher / Sarah Lowell	2 episodes
1967	Run for Your Life	Rachel Pike	Episode: "The Inhuman Predicament"
1967	Off to See the Wizard	Gypsy Queen	Episode: "Gypsy Colt"
1967	Judd, for the Defense	Lydia Gray	Episode: "Everyone Loved Harlan But His Wife"
1968	Journey to the Unknown	June Wiley	Episode: "Matakitas Is Coming"
1968–1970	The Name of the Game	Hilary Vanderman / Tracy Cannon / Marisa Cummings	3 episodes
1968–1971	Ironside	Gloria Campbell / Barbara Richards / Barbara Jones	3 episodes
1969	The F.B.I.	Kate Burke	Episode: "The Swindler"
1969	Mannix	Jean McBride	S3-Episode 03: "Return to Summer Grove"
1970	Gunsmoke	Dr. Sam McTavish	Episode: "Sam McTavish, M.D."
1970	Dan August	Carla	Episode: "When the Shouting Dies"
1970–1973	Marcus Welby, M.D.	Janet Devaney / Helen Wagner	2 episodes
1970–1974	Medical Center	Nora Crayton / Eva / Dr. Gloria Howell	4 episodes
1971	Hawaii Five-O	Flora Whiting	Episode: "Dear Enemy"
1971	In Search of America	Jenny Olson	ABC Movie of the Week
1971	Cannon	Diana Langston	Television film
1971	Alias Smith and Jones	Belle Jordan	Episode: "The Posse That Wouldn't Quit"
1971	A Howling in the Woods	Rose Staines	Television film
1971–1973	Owen Marshall, Counselor at Law	Nancy Hodges / Joan Baldwin	2 episodes
1972	Jigsaw	Lilah Beth Cummings	Television film
1972	A Great American Tragedy	Gloria Wilkes	ABC Movie of the Week
1972–1975	Cannon	Vivian Cabe / Dr. Adams	2 episodes
1973	Baffled!	Andrea Glenn	Television film
1973	Journey to the Unknown	June Wiley	Television film ("Matakitas is Coming" segment)
1973	Columbo	Viveca Scott	Episode: "Lovely But Lethal"
1973	Runaway!	Ellen Staffo	ABC Movie of the Week
1974	Live Again, Die Again	Marcia Carmichael	ABC Movie of the Week
1974	The Underground Man	Eleanor Strom	Television film
1974	The Strange and Deadly Occurrence	Christine Rhodes	TV film
1975	The Wonderful World of Disney	Kate Tannen	Episode: "Wild Country: Part 2"
1975	The Streets of San Francisco	Catherine Wyatt	Episode: "Men Will Die"
1976	Ellery Queen	Celeste Wakefield	Episode: "The Adventure of the Two-Faced Woman"
1976	Movin' On	Sheila Powers	Episode: "Sing It Again, Sonny"
1976	McNaughton's Daughter	Grace Coventry	Episode: "McNaughton's Daughter"
1976	Judge Horton and the Scottsboro Boys	Mrs. Horton	Television film
1976	State Fair	Melissa Bryant	Television film
1976	Smash-Up on Interstate 5	Erica	Television film
1977	Fire!	Martha Wagner	Television film
1977	Barnaby Jones	Diane Magnus	Episode: "The Reincarnation"
1978	How the West Was Won	Beth	2 episodes
1978	Fantasy Island	Martha Tate	Episode: "Superstar/Salem"
1978	The Runaways	Joan Larkin	Episode: "Lies We Live With"
1978	And I Alone Survived	Irene Elder	Television film
1980	Buck Rogers in the 25th Century	Tora	Episode: "Flight of the War Witch"
1980	Roughnecks	Ida McBride	Television film
1981	Our Family Business	Patricia	Television film
1981	Magnum, P.I.	Joan Gibson	Episode: "Mad Buck Gibson"
1982	Mazes and Monsters	Cat Wheeling	Television film
1982–1984	The Love Boat	Eve Springer / Arlene Kemper / Bess Hensinger	3 episodes
1983	Little House: A New Beginning	Ruthy Leland	Episode: "The Last Summer"
1983	Trapper John, M.D.	Liz Waleska	Episode: "Blue Genes"
1983	Travis McGee	Julie Lawless	Television film
1984	Helen Keller: The Miracle Continues	Kate Keller	Television film
1984	Matt Houston	Mary Haywood	Episode: "The High Fashion Murders"
1984–1987	Hotel	Ruth / Grace Harlan / Millie Broom / Teresa Clayborne	4 episodes
1985	Finder of Lost Loves	Joanna Shaw	Episode: "Deadly Silence"
1985	International Airport	Elaine Corley	Television film
1985	Crazy Like a Fox	Georgina	Episode: "Requiem for a Fox"
1985–1991	Murder, She Wrote	Nancy Landon / Charmaine Calloway Thompson / Elizabeth Gates	3 episodes
1988	Simon & Simon	Catherine Van Alder-Vicente	Episode: "The Richer They Are the Harder They Fall"
1989	The Hijacking of the Achille Lauro	Sophie Kubacki	Television film
