= Security Risk (film) =

1954 film by Harold D. Schuster

- Theatrical release poster
- Directed by: Harold D. Schuster
- Screenplay by: Jo Pagano; John Rich
- Story by: John Rich
- Produced by: William F. Broidy
- Starring: John Ireland; Dorothy Malone; Keith Larsen; Dolores Donlon; John Craven; Susan Cummings
- Cinematography: John J. Martin
- Edited by: Ace Herman
- Production company: William F. Broidy Productions
- Distributed by: Allied Artists Pictures
- Release date: August 8, 1954
- Running time: 69 minutes
- Country: United States
- Language: English

Security Risk is a 1954 American action film directed by Harold D. Schuster and written by Jo Pagano and John Rich. The film stars John Ireland, Dorothy Malone, Keith Larsen, Dolores Donlon, John Craven and Susan Cummings. The film was released on August 8, 1954, by Allied Artists Pictures.

== Cast ==
- John Ireland as Ralph Payne
- Dorothy Malone as Donna Weeks
- Keith Larsen as Ted Noland
- Dolores Donlon as Peggy Weeks
- John Craven as Dr. Lanson
- Susan Cummings as Joan Cochran
- Joe Bassett as Malone
- Burt Wenland as Burke
- Steven Clark as Johnny
- Murray Alper as Mike
- Harold J. Kennedy as Sheriff Bowman
