= Union Pacific (TV series) =

- Starring: Jeff Morrow; Judson Pratt; Susan Cummings
- Country of origin: United States
- No. of seasons: 1
- No. of episodes: 38

Production
- Running time: 30 minutes
- Production company: California National Productions

Original release
- Network: Syndication
- Release: 1958 – 1959

Union Pacific is a Western television series starring Jeff Morrow, Judson Pratt, and Susan Cummings that aired in syndication from 1958 until 1959. This show was inspired by the 1939 film also named Union Pacific, starring Joel McCrea, Barbara Stanwyck, and Robert Preston.

The series follows the exploits of Bart McClelland, played by Morrow, as he supervises the construction and extension of the Union Pacific Railroad west of Omaha, Nebraska, to Promontory, northwest of Salt Lake City, Utah. McClelland was mostly concerned with right-of-way issues, which could be affected by stubborn landowners, ranchers, Indians, outlaws, and other factors. Helping McClelland with his work was surveyor Billy Kincaid, played by Pratt. Susan Cummings rounded out the cast as Georgia, proprietor of the Golden Nugget Saloon, the rolling bar that followed the railroad workers along the tracks. Union Pacific never developed a following and was cancelled after a single season.
