= Bertie the Bus =

Bertie the Bus may refer to:

- A character in The Railway Series book series
- A 1980 book by Ingrid Pitt
