= Suzie Kaye =

American actress

- Born: Susan Helene Klein; September 2, 1941; Manhattan, New York City, New York, U.S.
- Died: 2008
- Occupations: Actress, singer, dancer
- Years active: 1951–1973
- Known for: West Side Story (1961), Love Is a Many Splendored Thing

Suzie Kaye (born Susan Helene Klein; September 2, 1941 – 2008) was an American actress, singer, and dancer. She began her career as a child performer on live television in New York and later appeared in the Academy Award–winning film West Side Story (1961). During the 1960s, she became a familiar presence in youth-oriented musical, beach, and drive-in films, before achieving further prominence as a regular cast member on the CBS daytime soap opera Love Is a Many Splendored Thing from 1969 to 1973.

== Early life and family ==
Kaye was born Susan Helene Klein in Manhattan, New York City, and raised in Brooklyn. She was the daughter of Abe Klein, a professional musician, and Ethel Klein, a singer who performed in New York City venues including the Old Romanian on Allen Street.

U.S. census records place the Klein family in New York during her childhood. She had one known sibling, a sister, Beatrice Klein (later Beatrice Marx).

Kaye showed an early aptitude for music and dance, studying classical piano as well as tap and ballet. At age ten, she began auditioning professionally and soon entered live television, gaining extensive experience performing weekly on musical-variety programs.

== Career ==
=== Early television and stage work ===
Kaye began her professional career as a child performer, becoming a regular on the New York–based musical-variety television series Star Time Kids, where she sang and danced live for six years alongside performers such as Connie Francis and Bobby Darin.

In addition to television, she appeared in stage productions including The Music Man, Show Boat, The Boy Friend, and Flower Drum Song. A feature article in the Berkeley Daily Gazette in 1963 described her as a “youthful, energetic” performer noted for her singing, dancing, and acting ability while appearing in a stage production of West Side Story at the Berkeley Community Theatre.

=== Film career ===
Kaye made her film debut in West Side Story (1961), directed by Robert Wise and Jerome Robbins, portraying Rosalia, one of the Sharks. Though under eighteen at the time of filming, she received court permission to participate in the production. Her performance included appearances in several of the film’s major musical numbers, including “America” and “Dance at the Gym.”

Following West Side Story, she appeared in a series of youth-oriented films, including Tammy and the Doctor (1963), Women of the Prehistoric Planet (1966), and Wild Wild Winter (1966). In 1967, she transitioned into roles associated with the beach-film cycle, appearing in Clambake opposite Elvis Presley, It's a Bikini World, and C'mon, Let’s Live a Little.

Her final substantial film roles included The Angry Breed (1968), in which she portrayed a biker gang member, and a cameo appearance in The Comic (1969), directed by Carl Reiner.

=== Television career ===
Throughout the 1960s, Kaye appeared in numerous television series and specials, including Margie, The Many Loves of Dobie Gillis, The F.B.I., Tarzan, and Bob Hope Presents the Chrysler Theatre. She also appeared on variety programs such as Shindig!, The Tonight Show Starring Johnny Carson, The Milton Berle Show, and The Merv Griffin Show.

In 1969, she joined the cast of the CBS daytime soap opera Love Is a Many Splendored Thing as Angel Allison Chernak, a prominent antagonist. She remained with the series until its cancellation in 1973, appearing in the role for four years during a period when the program was broadcast live for part of its run.

== Personal life ==
Kaye married Laurence Stone, with whom she was married for twenty-five years; the two later remained close friends. After the conclusion of her acting career, she pursued business interests outside the entertainment industry.

In later years, Kaye spoke openly about personal struggles following her departure from acting and credited recovery with allowing her to establish a stable life away from the entertainment industry.

== Death ==
Kaye died in 2008.

== Filmography ==
=== Film ===
- West Side Story (1961)
- Tammy and the Doctor (1963)
- Women of the Prehistoric Planet (1966)
- Wild Wild Winter (1966)
- Clambake (1967)
- It’s a Bikini World (1967)
- C’mon, Let’s Live a Little (1967)
- The Angry Breed (1968)
- The Comic (1969) (cameo)

=== Television ===
- Star Time Kids (1951–1957)
- Margie (1961)
- The Many Loves of Dobie Gillis (1962)
- Talent Scouts (1963)
- Arrest and Trial (1963)
- Shindig! (1965)
- Bob Hope Presents the Chrysler Theatre (1965)
- The Smothers Brothers Show (1966)
- Run, Buddy, Run (1966)
- The Jones Boys (1967)
- The F.B.I. (1967)
- Tarzan (1968)
- Love Is a Many Splendored Thing (1969–1973)
