= Women of the Prehistoric Planet =

1966 film by Arthur C. Pierce

- Theatrical half-sheet display poster
- Directed by: Arthur C. Pierce
- Written by: Arthur C. Pierce
- Produced by: George Edwards
- Starring: Wendell Corey; Keith Larsen; John Agar; Paul Gilbert; Merry Anders; Irene Tsu
- Cinematography: Archie R. Dalzell
- Edited by: George White
- Music by: Gordon Zahler
- Distributed by: Realart Pictures
- Release date: April 15, 1966
- Running time: 90 minutes
- Country: United States
- Language: English

Women of the Prehistoric Planet is a 1966 American science fiction/action film written and directed by Arthur C. Pierce and starring Wendell Corey.

== Plot ==
A spacefaring crew from an advanced civilization is preparing to return home after an extended voyage. The crew includes "humans" (who are White) and "Centaurians" (who are Asian).

The Centaurians have been rescued from their home planet after an unspecified catastrophic event has devastated their planet. They are being returned with the spacefaring explorers with an expectation that they will be assimilated into their new parent culture. One of the ships in the fleet is hijacked by a few of its Centaurian passengers and crash-lands on a prehistoric planet in the "Solaris" system. Countermanding orders, the rest of the fleet returns to search for survivors after the crash.

By the time the rescuers (traveling at fast sublight speeds) are able to return to the planet, they encounter the descendants of the original crash survivors – explained in a simplified version of time dilation. Linda King, a Centaurian from the rescue ship, falls in love with Tang Anderson after he saves her from drowning.

After fighting the planet's indigenous species (including giant iguanas meant to represent dinosaurs), Tang and Linda – revealed to be Admiral David King's daughter – are marooned on this savage and primitive planet (which is revealed at the end to be Earth).

== Cast ==
- Wendell Corey as Admiral David King
- Keith Larsen as Commander Scott
- John Agar as Dr. Farrell
- Paul Gilbert as Lt. Red Bradley
- Merry Anders as Lt. Karen Lamont
- Stuart Margolin as Chief
- Todd Lasswell as Lt. Charles Anderson
- Irene Tsu as Linda King
- Robert Ito as Tang Anderson
- Nobuko Miyamoto as Zenda Anderson
- Glenn Langan as Captain Ross
- Sally Frei as Sally
- Suzie Kaye as Ensign Stevens
- Kam Tong as Jung
- Ron Stokes as Sgt. Allen
- Adam Roarke as Harris
- Paul Hampton as Wilson
- Ronald Lyon as Sgt. Nevins
- Hans Wedemeyer as Jang
- Anthony Lee as Navigation Officer
- Joyce Carol as Centaurian Girl
- Jamie McRae as Sgt. Long

== Themes ==
Race relations are the film's overarching theme, although its approach to the subject has been typically criticized in retrospect.

"... a blatant social commentary on race relations (from a mid-60s point of view). Even though the screenplay tries to preach fairness, some of the subtle signals send contradictory messages. The crew members of the Cosmos are portrayed as superior. The Centaurians as inferior. The crew are clearly all-white. They dress in tidy white uniforms with snappy cravats. They are in control, follow orders, and are concerned for others. The Centaurians are "rustic," (and all played by asians) Their outfits are sleeveless. Their men are hotheads and trouble makers. (their women are nice, though). Even the "progressive" notion of Tang being the mixed-race son of a "white" and a Centaurian, is undermined by his apparent comfort at being a cave man. Subtle signal: "They" are savages at heart.

== Reviews ==
Leonard Maltin gave the film one and a half stars. Writing for AllMovie, critic Bruce Eder described the film as a "camp classic" that features "laughable special effects", "obviously rushed performances", and an "awkward interjection of some lunkhead humor". The film has an 18% approval rating at the review aggregator website Rotten Tomatoes. Other reviewers have assessed the film as a "bomb" and described it as "Typical bad sci-fi ... with horrid special effects".

== Home media ==
Englewood Entertainment first released the original film on VHS videotape, and later on DVD. The film's Mystery Science Theater 3000 version was broadcast as episode #104 and was released by Rhino Home Video as part of their DVD "Collection, Volume 9" box set; it was accompanied by a short introduction by actress Irene Tsu (Linda King).

== Poster ==
Women of the Prehistoric Planet's provocative film poster features the tagline, "It's a battle of the sexes as savage planet women attack female space invaders", and depicts a blonde and a brunette in a catfight. However, there are no "planet women" in the film, as the only female Centaurian (Linda) does not originate from the prehistoric planet. Nor does the film contain any scenes of women fighting each other.

== See also ==
- List of American films of 1966
