= Brave Eagle =

- Starring: Keith Larsen; Bert Wheeler; Kim Winona; Anthony Numkena (then Keena Nomkeena); Pat Hogan
- Country of origin: United States
- No. of seasons: 1
- No. of episodes: 26

Production
- Running time: 30 minutes

Original release
- Network: CBS
- Release: September 28, 1955 – March 14, 1956

Brave Eagle is a 26-episode half-hour Western television series which aired on CBS from September 28, 1955, to March 14, 1956, with rebroadcasts continuing until June 6.

== Overview ==
Keith Larsen, who was of Norwegian descent, starred as Brave Eagle, a peaceful young Cheyenne chief. Larsen was one-fourth Cheyenne on his mother's side.

The program was unconventional in that it reflects the Native American viewpoint in the settlement of the American West and was the first series to feature an American Indian character as a lead character.

Larsen's co-stars were Kim Winona (1930–1978), a Santee Sioux Indian, as Morning Star, Brave Eagle's romantic interest; Anthony Numkena (born 1942) of Arizona, a Hopi Indian then using the stage name Keena Nomkeena, appeared as Keena, the adopted son of Brave Eagle; Pat Hogan (1920–1966) as Black Cloud, and Bert Wheeler (1895–1968) of the comedy team Wheeler & Woolsey, as the halfbreed Smokey Joe, full of tribal tall tales but accompanying wisdom.

The episodes center upon routine activities among the Cheyenne, clashes with other tribes, attempts to prevent war, encroachment from white settlers, racial prejudice, and a threat of smallpox.

== Episodes ==
No. in season	Title	Directed by	Written by	Original release date
1	"Blood Brother"	Paul Landres	Mona Fisher, Jack Jacobs, and Malvin Wald	September 28, 1955
2	"Cry of the Heron"	Paul Landres	Mona Fisher	October 5, 1955
3	"The Treachery of At-Ta-Tu"	Paul Landres	Dwight V. Babcock	October 12, 1955
4	"Gold of Haunted Mountain"	Paul Landres	Wells Root	October 19, 1955
5	"Search For The Sun"	Paul Landres	Mona Fisher	October 26, 1955
6	"Moonfire"	Paul Landres	Mona Fisher	November 2, 1955
7	"Mask Of The Manitou"	Paul Landres	William Copeland	November 9, 1955
8	"The Flight"	Paul Landres	Jack Laird	November 16, 1955
9	"Code Of A Chief"	Paul Landres	Lawrence L. Goldman	November 23, 1955
10	"Face Of Fear"	Unknown	Unknown	November 30, 1955
11	"Voice Of The Serpent"	Paul Landres	Mona Fisher	December 7, 1955
12	"Shield Of Honor"	Paul Landres	Mona Fisher	December 14, 1955
13	"The Challenge"	Paul Landres	Jack Jacobs and Malvin Wald	December 21, 1955
14	"Medicine Drums"	Paul Landres	William Copeland	December 28, 1955
15	"The Spirit of Hidden Valley"	Unknown	Unknown	January 4, 1956
16	"Papoose"	Paul Landres	Wells Root	January 11, 1956
17	"The Storm Fool"	Paul Landres	Mona Fisher	January 18, 1956
18	"The Gentle Warrior"	Paul Landres	Unknown	January 25, 1956
19	"The Strange Animal"	Paul Landres	William Copeland	February 1, 1956
20	"White Medicine Man"	Paul Landres	Dwight V. Babcock	February 8, 1956
21	"Death Trap"	Unknown	Unknown	February 15, 1956
22	"War Paint"	Paul Landres	Wells Root	February 22, 1956
23	"Valley Of Decision"	George Blair	William Copeland	February 29, 1956
24	"Witch Bear"	Paul Landres	William Copeland	March 7, 1956
25	"Trouble at Medicine Creek"	Paul Landres	Lawrence L. Goldman	March 14, 1956
26	"Ambush at Arrow Pass"	Unknown	Unknown	March 21, 1956

== Guest stars ==
- Ann Doran
- William Fawcett
- Anthony George
- Jonathan Hale
- Brett Halsey
- Wayne Mallory
- Dennis Moore
- Steve Pendleton
- Steve Raines
- Henry Rowland
- Fred Sherman
- Rick Vallin
- Lee Van Cleef
- Pierre Watkin
- Gloria Winters

== Production notes ==
Though Brave Eagle was produced by NBC, it aired on CBS at 7:30 p.m. Wednesday preceding Arthur Godfrey and His Friends. Since the 1980s, several episodes have been released on videotape. Brave Eagle was filmed by Roy Rogers Productions on Rogers' 130-acre (0.53 km^{2}) ranch in Chatsworth in Los Angeles, California, as well as the Corriganville Ranch in Simi Valley. Jack Lacey was the producer; George Blair and Paul Landres were the directors. Sam Bear, a full Chippewa, was the technical adviser.

Brave Eagle's principal competition was ABC's Disneyland, the Walt Disney anthology series. It was replaced by Cartoon Theatre.

== Critical response ==
James Devane, writing in The Cincinnati Enquirer, found Brave Eagle to be "downright dull", so much so that he nearly went to sleep "before many minutes had passed" trying to review two episodes. Devane expressed appreciation for the program's efforts to portray Indians in a better light than other programs had done, but he wrote that the result was portraying them as "bores who talked too much and did too little".

== Merchandising ==
Dell Comics released a Brave Eagle comic book series based on the TV show. It was published between 1956 and 1958 and drawn by Dan Spiegle.
