= The Rose Bowl Story =

1952 American film by William Beaudine

- Theatrical release poster
- Directed by: William Beaudine
- Written by: Charles R. Marion
- Produced by: Richard V. Heermance; Walter Mirisch
- Starring: Vera Miles; Richard Rober; Marshall Thompson; Natalie Wood
- Cinematography: Harry Neumann
- Edited by: Walter Hannemann
- Music by: Marlin Skiles
- Production company: Monogram Pictures
- Distributed by: Monogram Pictures
- Release date: August 24, 1952
- Running time: 73 minutes
- Country: United States
- Language: English

The Rose Bowl Story is a 1952 American romance film directed by William Beaudine and starring Marshall Thompson, Vera Miles and Richard Rober, featuring a young Natalie Wood. The film was made in Cinecolor. It follows the relationship between a college football player and his girlfriend.

== Plot ==
Qualifying to play in the illustrious Rose Bowl football game on New Year's Day, a Midwestern college's quarterback, Steve Davis, is less enthusiastic than expected, as playing football does not excite him, but his teammate Bronc Buttram is thrilled. Their coach, Jim Hadley, is equally pleased because his ill wife has gone to warmer Glendale, California for her health, allowing him to spend more time with her.

Steve perks up in Pasadena while meeting the Rose Bowl's committee and particularly the tournament's queen, Denny Burke, a beauty in a fur coat. Steve believes she is wealthy as well as beautiful and manages to get her telephone number. He cannot get through, however, because Denny's younger sister Sally is always tying up the phone.

Finding her house, Steve learns she is a middle-class girl whose dad, "Iron Mike" Burke, once played in a Rose Bowl game himself. Denny takes exception to Steve's disappointment that she is not rich and to his blasé attitude toward the Rose Bowl, a tradition her family loves. The self-involved Steve develops a guilty conscience.

Agreeing to spend New Year's Eve with her family, Steve stands up Denny because he is at the hospital, where Coach Hadley's wife has taken a turn for the worse. He gets busy signals phoning because Sally's hogging it again. Next morning, Bronc explains to Denny and she is relieved. At the game, the coach announces his wife's going to be all right. Steve leads the team to victory, unselfishly letting Bronc score the winning touchdown. He and Denny are in love and plan to marry.

== Cast ==
- Marshall Thompson as Steve Davis
- Vera Miles as Denny Burke
- Richard Rober as Coach James Hadley
- Natalie Wood as Sally Burke
- Keith Larsen as Bronc Buttram
- Tom Harmon as himself
- Ann Doran as Mrs. Addie Burke
- James Dobson as Allie Bassler
- Jim Backus as Michael 'Iron Mike' Burke
- Clarence Kolb as 'Gramps' Burke
- Barbara Woodell as Mrs. Mary Hadley
- Bill Welsh as himself

== See also ==
- List of American football films

== Bibliography ==
- Marshall, Wendy L. William Beaudine: From Silents to Television. Scarecrow Press, 2005.
- Umphlett, Wiley Lee. The Movies Go to College: Hollywood and the World of the College-life Film. Fairleigh Dickinson Univ Press, 1984.
