= Molly and Lawless John =

1972 film by Gary Nelson

- Directed by: Gary Nelson
- Written by: Terry Kingsley-Smith
- Produced by: Dennis Durney
- Starring: Vera Miles; Sam Elliott; Clu Gulager; John Anderson; Cynthia Myers
- Cinematography: Charles F. Wheeler
- Edited by: Gene Fowler Jr.
- Music by: Johnny Mandel
- Production company: Malibu Productions
- Distributed by: Producers Distributing Corporation
- Release date: December 15, 1972
- Running time: 98 minutes
- Country: United States
- Language: English

Molly and Lawless John is a 1972 American Western film directed by Gary Nelson and starring Vera Miles and Sam Elliott. John Anderson, Clu Gulager, Cynthia Myers, Charles Pinney, Bob Westmoreland, Melinda Chavaria, and Grady Hill co-star in supporting roles.

== Plot ==
Molly Parker is married to the sheriff of an American frontier town. She finds herself dangerously drawn to a condemned prisoner, Johnny Lawler, in her husband's jail. He perceives her restlessness, flatters her, and tells her of his unhappy childhood. That night Molly's husband threatens her and is scornful when she tries to talk to him about them having a baby. She breaks John out of jail and they ride off together.

She has fallen in love with him, but after they get away it becomes increasingly clear that he cares for her only as long as she can help him escape the posse pursuing him. He boasts to her about the lies he told to win her sympathy. When surprised by the posse he takes flight and abandons her, but she follows him and after they get away he explains his actions in a way she accepts.

While in hiding they come across a dying Indian woman with a newborn baby. John wants to get rid of the infant, saying they are already too short of food and water, but Molly insists that they look after the child. She leaves the baby with him while she goes into town for supplies, and he takes care of the baby affectionately while she is gone. The other reason for her going to town is to deliver a message to John's girlfriend, Dolly. Molly brings her back to the hideout shack, and John and Dolly have a romantic reunion while Molly waits outside with the baby.

After the girlfriend leaves to make plans for her and John to escape to Mexico, Molly rides back into town with the baby. When she returns, the posse secretly follows her to their hideout. A shootout follows and John and Molly again escape, with the baby. Once they are safely away an angry John asks Molly how the posse knew to follow her. Under his insistent questioning she admits that while in town she had the baby baptized in John's name.

A livid John is about to take out his fury on the baby, but before he can do anything violent Molly shoots him. She drapes his dead body over a horse, and, with the baby, rides back to her husband's town. She tells the deputy who approaches her she claims the reward for having recaptured John, that he took her hostage when he escaped and held her captive until she was able to shoot him.

== Cast ==
- Vera Miles as Molly Parker
- Sam Elliott as Johnny Lawler
- Clu Gulager as Deputy Tom Clements
- John Anderson as Sheriff Marvin Parker
- Cynthia Myers as Dolly Winward
- Charles Pinney as Reverend
- Bob Westmoreland as Telegraph Operator
- Melinda Chavaria as Pregnant Apache
- Grady Hill as Deputy

== Production ==
Molly and Lawless John was Gary Nelson's directorial debut. He was a television director for many years and second assistant director on The Searchers. Filming began in June 1971 in New Mexico reusing some locations filmed in Clint Eastwood's Hang 'Em High. Scenes filmed in Las Cruces took about a week. Scenes were filmed near the Rio Grande, in a cave, and a mining shaft. Scenes were filmed in Mesilla. Some scenes were also filmed in Santa Fe. The weather had been brutally hot as to where Miles passed out in triple digit temperatures according to Elliot who told columnist Marilyn Beck. Miles was 15 years her senior to Elliot. White Sands Monument was used in scenes.

=== Music ===
Take Me Home has lyrics by Alan and Marilyn Bergman and sheet music by Johnny Mandel.

== Release ==
Molly and Lawless John was officially released in Los Angeles on December 15, 1972. It was in New Mexico theatres on October 25 with Miles, Elliott, and Dennis Durney.

=== Critical response ===
Take Me Home was nominated for a Golden Globe Award for Best Original Song in at the 30th Golden Globe Awards in 1973.

== See also ==
- List of American films of 1972
