= Secret of Treasure Mountain =

1956 film by Seymour Friedman

- Theatrical release poster
- Directed by: Seymour Friedman
- Screenplay by: David Lang
- Produced by: Wallace MacDonald
- Starring: Valerie French; Raymond Burr; William Prince; Lance Fuller; Susan Cummings; Pat Hogan
- Cinematography: Benjamin H. Kline
- Edited by: Edwin H. Bryant
- Production company: Columbia Pictures
- Distributed by: Columbia Pictures
- Release date: June 25, 1956
- Running time: 68 minutes
- Country: United States
- Language: English

Secret of Treasure Mountain is a 1956 American Western film directed by Seymour Friedman and written by David Lang. The film stars Valerie French, Raymond Burr, William Prince, Lance Fuller, Susan Cummings and Pat Hogan. The film was released on June 25, 1956, by Columbia Pictures.

== Plot ==
Years ago a Spaniard buried gold on Apache land. The Apaches killed him, threw a curse on the ground and gold, and posted a guard. The villainous Burr and his henchmen 200 years later try to get the fabled gold, but they too fall victim to the curse.

== Cast ==
- Valerie French as Audrey Lancaster
- Raymond Burr as Cash Larsen
- William Prince as Robert Kendall
- Lance Fuller as Juan Alvarado
- Susan Cummings as Tawana
- Pat Hogan as Vahoe
- Reginald Sheffield as Edward Lancaster
- Rodolfo Hoyos Jr. as Francisco Martinez
