= Mission Batangas =

- Theatrical release poster
- Directed by: Keith Larsen
- Written by: Lew Antonio
- Produced by: Keith Larsen
- Starring: Dennis Weaver; Vera Miles; Keith Larsen; Leopoldo Salcedo
- Cinematography: Herbert Theis
- Edited by: Anthony Di Marco; George Shrader
- Production companies: Batangas Productions; D.I.B.A. Productions Media
- Distributed by: Manson Distributing Corporation
- Release date: November 1968 (U.S.)
- Running time: 100 min
- Country: United States
- Language: English

Mission Batangas is a 1968 American action-adventure war film directed by Keith Larsen. Set during World War II, the film stars Dennis Weaver, Vera Miles, and Larsen himself, and follows a mercenary American pilot who becomes involved in a plot to hide the Philippine government's gold reserves from invading Japanese forces. The film was shot on location in the Philippines and features a supporting cast of prominent Filipino character actors.

== Plot ==
Set against the backdrop of the 1942 Japanese invasion of the Philippines, the story follows Chip Corbett, a private American pilot who smuggles refugees out of the country for a fee. His final job goes awry when his passenger is killed by local rebels while onboarding, resulting in a crash landing on the island of Corregidor. Amidst the wreckage, Corbett crosses paths with Joan Barnes, a missionary nurse, and Colonel Turner, who leads a stranded military garrison. The group is in the middle of a desperate operation to smuggle the nation's gold reserves out via barge to a waiting U.S. submarine, but their plans are derailed.

Determined to keep the treasure out of enemy hands, the rebels decide to sink the barge using a makeshift explosive, intending to recover the sunken gold after the war. Corbett offers to pilot the bombing run, provided they can secure an aircraft. Joan points out that her father, who runs an inland mission, possesses a small seaplane.

The group embarks on a treacherous jungle path to retrieve the plane, pursued by enemy troops. During a deadly ambush, Colonel Turner is killed, but the survivors are rescued by a local indigenous headhunting tribe allied with Joan—they kill the pursuers using poisoned blowdarts. Joan sustains fatal injuries during the firefight and passes away shortly after they arrive at the mission. Deeply affected by her death, Corbett abandons his selfish motives and pledges his loyalty to the Philippine resistance, launching the seaplane for what he knows will be a fatal attack.

== Cast ==
- Dennis Weaver as Chip Corbett, the mercenary pilot
- Vera Miles as Joan Barnes, the missionary nurse
- Keith Larsen as Colonel Turner, the Philippine guerrilla commandant
- Leopoldo Salcedo as Santos
- Helen Thompson as Maria
- Vic Diaz as a smuggler
- Bruno Punzalan as Yamata
- Fred Galang as Francisco

== Production ==
Mission Batangas was filmed on location in the Philippines in 1967. The film was produced by Keith Larsen, who also directed, co-wrote the story, and starred in the movie.
