= Keith Larsen =

American actor (1924–2006)

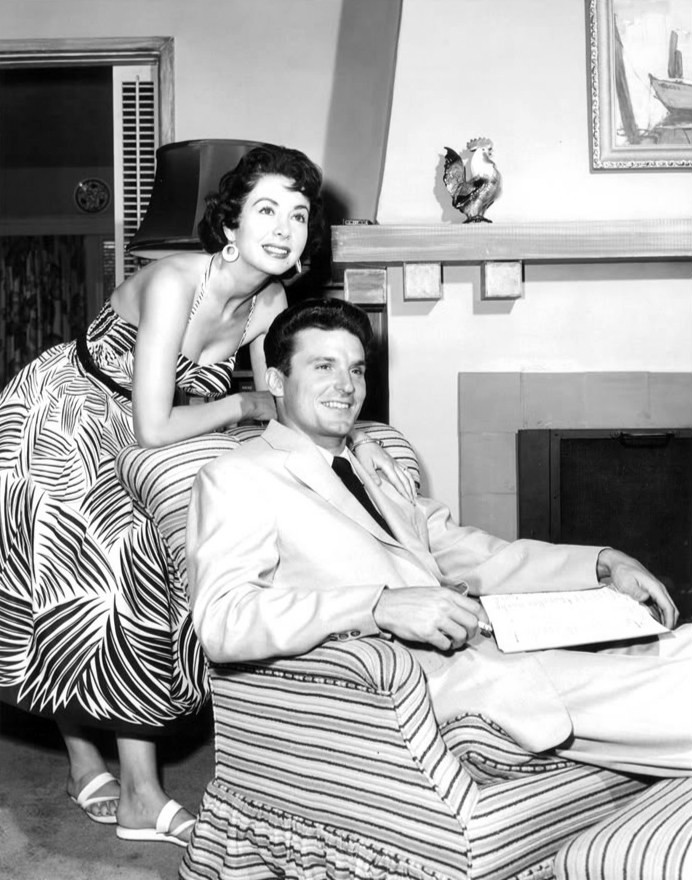
- Larsen with wife Susan at home, 1954.
- Born: Keith Larsen Burt; June 17, 1924; Salt Lake City, Utah, U.S.
- Died: December 13, 2006 (aged 82); Santa Barbara, California, U.S.
- Occupations: Actor, director, screenwriter, producer
- Spouses: Susan Cummings (m. 1953; div. 1960) Vera Miles (m. 1960; div. 1971) Trang Thu Nguyen (m. 1983)
- Children: 3

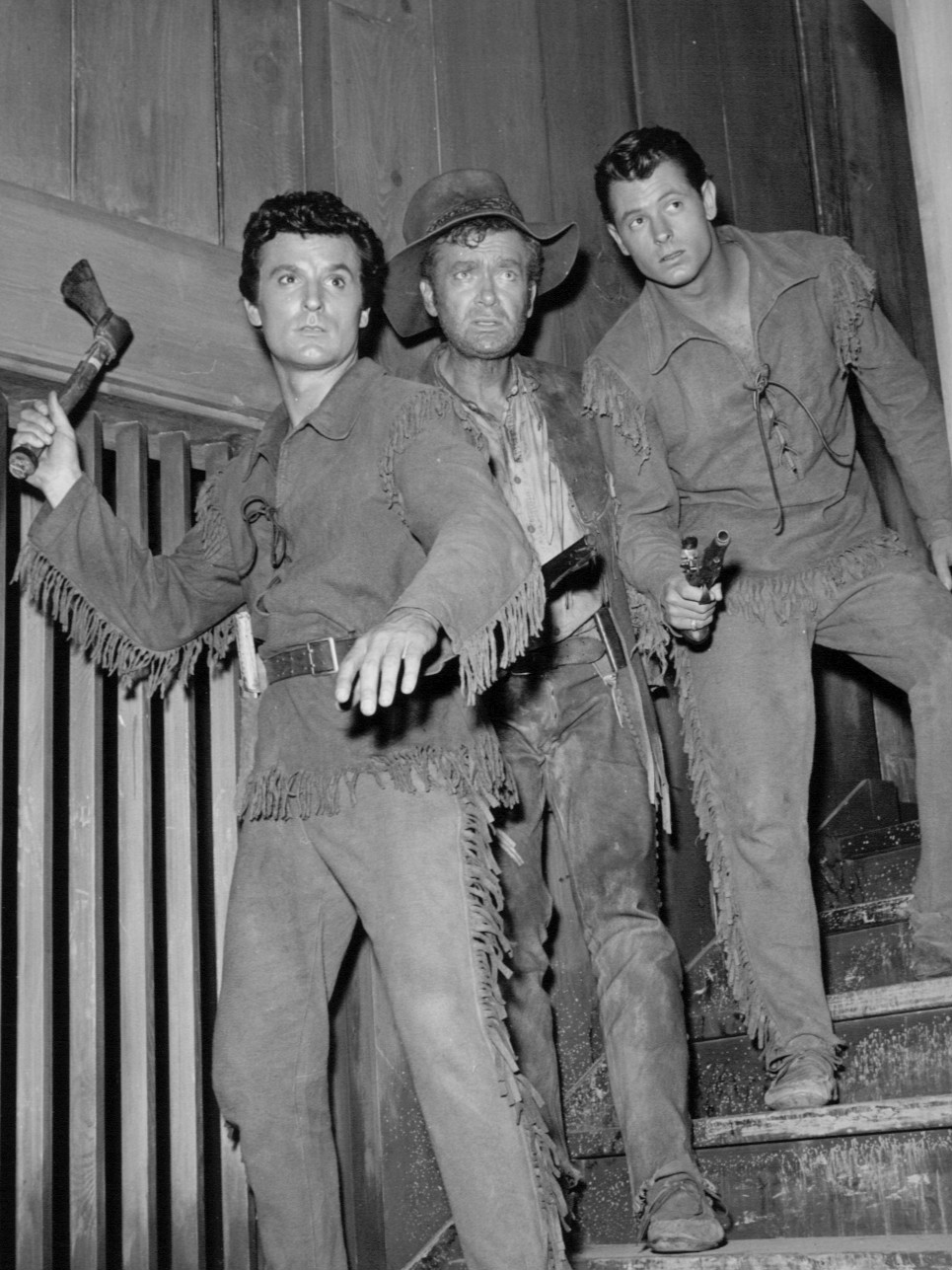
Cast of Northwest Passage (TV series) (1958). L-R: Keith Larsen, Buddy Ebsen and Don Burnett.

Keith Larsen (born Keith Larsen Burt, June 17, 1924 – December 13, 2006) was an American actor who starred in three short-lived television series between 1955 and 1961.

== Background ==
Larsen was born in Salt Lake City in 1924. He was of Norwegian descent. During World War II, he served in the United States Navy. After he was demobilized he became involved in stage acting in Santa Monica, California.

== Career ==
Larsen was tapped by a talent scout to play a small uncredited role in 1951 movie Operation Pacific. In 1952, Larsen played Ens. Barney Smith, an aircraft carrier fighter pilot, in the film Flat Top. In 1953, Larsen played the title role of Ed Reed, the Kid in the film Son of Belle Starr, in which his character tries to live an upright life despite the heritage of his two lawless parents, Belle Starr and Jim Reed.

Larsen's career was most notable for his work in four weekly television series, including playing Bart Adams in The Hunter (1954), Brave Eagle (1955), Northwest Passage (1958) (in which he starred as Major Robert Rogers), and The Aquanauts (1960).

In the 1955–1956 television season, Larsen starred in the 26-week CBS western Brave Eagle. Larsen portrayed Brave Eagle, a peaceful young Cheyenne chief. The program was unusual in that it reflected the Native American viewpoint in the settlement of the American West. Larsen's principal co-stars were Kim Winona (1930–1978) as Morning Star, Anthony Numkena, a Hopi Indian then using the stage name Keena Nomkeena, as Keena, Brave Eagle's foster son, and Bert Wheeler (1895–1968) as Smokey Joe.

He guest starred in 1957 on three CBS programs, as Paul in the "Anitra Dellano Story" of The Millionaire, and in two anthologies, as Howard in "The Blackwell Story" on Playhouse 90, and as Eddie Seabord in the episode "Father and Son Night" on General Electric Theater, hosted by future U.S. President Ronald W. Reagan.

In the 1958–1959 season, Larsen starred in the M-G-M/NBC series Northwest Passage, the story of Major Robert Rogers, an American soldier in upstate New York during the French and Indian War, loosely based on the first half of Kenneth Roberts' best-selling novel of the same name, published in 1937. Buddy Ebsen co-starred as Sergeant Hunk Marriner and Don Burnett as Ensign Langdon Towne. In 1959, Larsen guest starred on the CBS series Men into Space in the role of Jim Nichols in the episode " Christmas on the Moon". Also in 1959 Larsen played Major Rogers in the film Mission of Danger co-starring Buddy Ebsen.

In 1960–1961, Larsen appeared as 36-year-old former Navy diver Drake Andrews in the CBS adventure series The Aquanauts, an Ivan Tors Production renamed in March 1961 as Malibu Run. His co-star was Jeremy Slate (1926–2006). A sinus operation required Larsen to withdraw from the show, and he was replaced by Ron Ely as Mike Madison. The script line indicated that the character Andrews had rejoined the Navy.

After The Aquanauts, Larsen appeared as Jack Bennett in the 1961 episode "Blondes Prefer Gentlemen" of the ABC series The Roaring Twenties, with Donald May, Rex Reason, and Dorothy Provine. His other television roles, all in 1960, were as John Edwards in "The Hostage" episode of the ABC and syndicated western series, Tombstone Territory, as John Napier in "Nightmare Crossing" episode of NBC's The Man and the Challenge, and as the Indian Blue Raven in the episode "Seed of Hate" in NBC's western Wichita Town.

Larsen's later acting work was in Women of the Prehistoric Planet (1966), three films made in the Philippines, Caxambu!, (1967) Mission Batangas, where he began a new phase as a director as well as an actor, and The Omegans (1968) with Ingrid Pitt. He travelled to Japan to direct and co-star in The Walking Major, Mission Batanagas as Colonel Turner (1968), then did Night of the Witches as Reverend Ezra Jackson (1970), The Trap on Cougar Mountain (1972), Whitewater Sam in the title role (1977), and his last appearance, Young and Free (1979). He also directed and produced some of these same films.

== Personal life ==
Larsen was married three times. In 1953, he wed actress Susan Cummings. They had one child. After their divorce, he married actress Vera Miles on July 16, 1960; that marriage ended in divorce in 1971. Their son Erik Larsen was born in April 1961. After Larsen and Miles divorced, he married Trang Thu Nguyen in 1983. The couple had one child and remained married until Larsen died in 2006, aged 82, in Santa Barbara, California. Larsen adhered to Mormonism.

== Filmography ==
Year	Title	Role	Notes
1951	Operation Pacific	Crewman	Uncredited
1951	Flying Leathernecks	Charlie	Uncredited
1952	Paula	Intern	Uncredited
1952	The Rose Bowl Story	Bronc Buttram	
1952	Flat Top	Ens. Barney Smith / Barney Oldfield	
1952	Torpedo Alley	Minor Role	Uncredited
1952	Hiawatha	Pau PukKeewis	
1953	Fort Vengeance	Carey Ross	
1953	Son of Belle Starr	The Kid	
1953	War Paint	Taslik	
1954	Arrow in the Dust	Lieutenant Steve King	
1954	Security Risk	Ted Noland	
1955	Dial Red O	Ralph Wyatt	
1955	Chief Crazy Horse	Flying Hawk	
1955	Wichita	Bat Masterson	
1955	Night Freight	Don Peters	
1955	Desert Sands	El Zanal	
1957	Last of the Badmen	Roberts	
1957	Badlands of Montana	Rick Valentine	
1957	Apache Warrior	Katawan - aka The Apache Kid	
1966	Women of the Prehistoric Planet	Cmdr. Scott	
1967	Caxambu!	Emil Garrat	
1968	Mission Batangas	Colonel Turner	
1968	The Omegans	Chuck	
1970	The Walking Major/Aru heishi no kake	Captain White	
1970	Night of the Witches	Preacher Ezra Jackson	
1972	Trap on Cougar Mountain	The Father	Co-wrote, co-produced, directed and starred
1977	Whitewater Sam	Whitewater Sam	
1979	Young and Free	The Father	
