= The Omegans =

1968 American film by W. Lee Wilder

- Opening titles
- Directed by: W. Lee Wilder
- Written by: Waldon Weeland
- Produced by: Lorin Bennett Salob; W. Lee Wilder
- Starring: Keith Larsen; Ingrid Pitt; Lucien Pan
- Cinematography: Herbert V. Theis
- Edited by: Tony Lawson
- Music by: Albert Elms
- Production company: Merit Productions
- Distributed by: Paramount Pictures
- Release date: 1968
- Running time: 85 minutes
- Country: United States
- Language: English

The Omegans is a 1968 American low-budget science fiction thriller film directed by W. Lee Wilder and starring Keith Larsen, Ingrid Pitt and Lucien Pan. It was written by Waldon Weeland. The film was an early lead role for Ingrid Pitt.

== Cast ==
- Keith Larsen as Chuck
- Ingrid Pitt as Linda
- Lucien Pan as Valdemar
- Bruno Punzalan as Oki
- Joaquin Fajardo as Tumba
- John Yench as McAvoy
- Jeorge Santos as Clerk
- Joseph de Cordova as Dr. Salani
- Lina Inigo as singer

== Plot ==
In the jungle, artist Valdemar paints his wife Linda while their guide Chuck secretly plans to steal her away. When an expedition led by Dr. Salani and Bill McAvoy sets out to explore a mysterious, radioactive waterfall, Chuck dismisses the locals’ warnings about its cursed waters. Native guide Tumba dies after an eerie glowing shape drags him under.

Back home, Salani's experiments reveal that the water has strange properties—potentially a “Fountain of Youth.” Meanwhile, Valdemar discovers Linda and Chuck's plot to kill him. Instead of confronting them, he lures them back to the waterfall, where they bask in its rejuvenating effects. However, they soon experience insatiable thirst and rapid physical deterioration. Linda, pale and desperate, returns to the water while Valdemar watches, satisfied. Chuck, delirious and visibly aged, rushes back to the lab, only to find Salani gone. Returning to the jungle, he sees his own face now unrecognizable.

Linda, stumbling and sickly, finally sees her reflection in Valdemar's painting – a horrifying monster. In a panic, Chuck attempts to kill Valdemar, but Oki fatally shoots him. As he falls, Chuck fires again, accidentally killing Linda. Their bodies self-cremate, proving that cheaters never prosper.

== Production ==
The film was shot on location in the Philippines.

== Reception ==
It his obituary of Ingrid Pitt in The Guardian, Ronald Bergan described The Omegans as a "wretched low-budget sci-fi film."
