= Susan Heinkel =

American actress, producer, director, and writers (born 1944)

Susan Heinkel (born August 21, 1944) is an American former child actress whose program won a Chicago Emmy Award in 1959. Her activities as an adult included producing and directing industrial shows, making commercials for radio and television, recording messages for a telephone company, and writing scripts for radio and TV programs.

== Early years ==
Heinkel was born in St. Louis on August 21, 1944, the daughter of Mr. and Mrs. Walter J. Heinkel. When she was 3 years old she was spotted among students at a dancing school, and her talent led to her performing in a two-week engagement at a St. Louis hotel, taking the role of Shirley Temple in a Christmas show. At that same age she appeared on programs on St. Louis television station KSD. Her parents tried to avoid influencing her choice of career, leaving the decision up to her. She was an honor student in her elementary school. Her father was self-employed as a manufacturer's agent in St. Louis; after the family moved to Chicago, he lived in St. Louis during the week and commuted to Chicago for weekends. In addition to her performances, Heinkel was a child fashion model and photographer's model. She attended Immaculata High School in Chicago until her TV contract in that city ended. Then she went to Nerinx Hall High School in Webster Groves, Missouri. At Nerinx Hall her activities included appearing in a production of Calamity Jane.

== Career ==
=== Muny Opera ===
Heinkel gained some early experience in productions of the St. Louis Municipal Opera Theatre. She had bit parts in the 1952 productions of Annie Get Your Gun and Showboat. In 1954 she had a bigger role in Panama Hattie, a portrayal of which an article in the St. Louis Post-Dispatch said, "Critics have hailed her with relative effusiveness or overjoyed restraint." In 1960 she portrayed Becky Thatcher in Tom Sawyer, and in 1962 she played Kim MacAfee in Bye Bye Birdie. She was seen as Liesl von Trapp in the 1964 production of The Sound of Music.

=== Susan's Show ===
A producer from Chicago who was in St. Louis to watch a television program happened to see Heinkel on TV. As a result of that experience, in early September 1956 she began her own weekday program on WBBM-TV in Chicago. "By the time she arrived in Chicago, Heinkel was completely at ease in front of the camera, possessing a natural poise and charm that made her one of the most appealing young television performers of this or any other era." In its first month on the air, the program was "ahead of almost all its TV competitors in town". By the end of its first year on the air, Susie's Show had become the second-highest-rated daytime TV show in Chicago. Beginning on May 4, 1957, CBS added network-wide Saturday morning episodes of the program to the local weekday broadcasts, replacing Winky Dink and You. When the network picked it up, it was retitled Susan's Show. With that debut when she was 12 years old, Heinkel became the youngest star of her own network TV show. The program ran on CBS until January 18, 1958, and the Chicago version was a hit for six years.

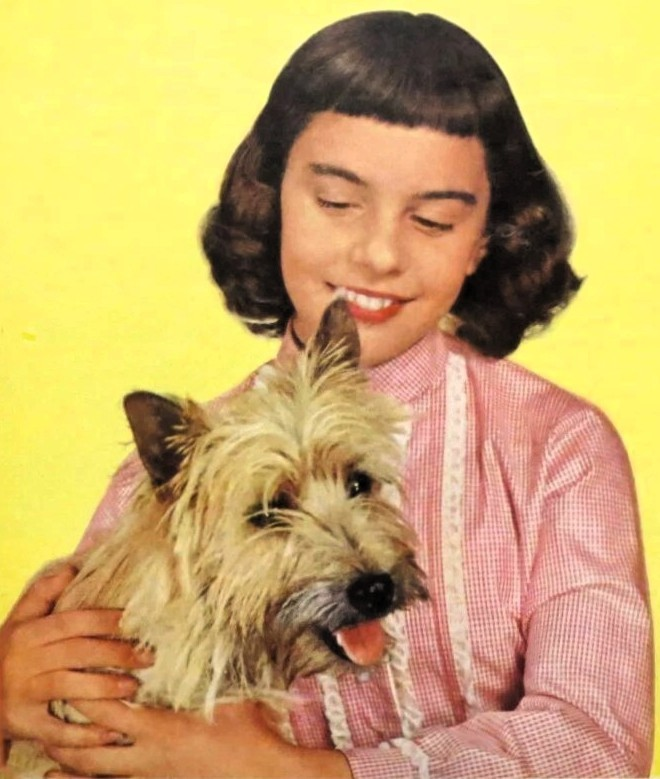
Susan Heinkel and Rusty in 1956

A single rehearsal preceded each episode of the show shortly before it went on the air. When Heinkel spoke to the camera, "Hi, kids, my name is Susan," the episode was under way. Her shaggy Cairn Terrier dog, Rusty, accompanied her in many activities on the program, including traveling magically on a flying kitchen stool that took them to Wonderville, where her activities included conversing with a talking table known as Mr. Pegasus. Other characters on the show were Caesar P. Penguin, the orchestra leader; Wolfgang, a violinist bear; Gregory, a flutist rabbit; and Bruce, a drumming rabbit. The set contained oversized furniture to make Heinkel appear smaller than her actual size. The characters' activities were supplemented with animated films from the Cartoon-a-Machine.

The show's writer, Paul Frumkin, described Heinkel as "a natural" for performing on the show. He said that he wrote only outlines, rather than complete scripts, for her; "Then she ad libs." Heinkel said, "I don't know what I'm going to do until I get to the studio. My ideas just seem to pop up from nowhere. I never think or talk about them." Her ability to ad-lib was useful when Rusty missed cues — situations that might have been stressful for older, more experienced performers. Her talent extended to doing commercials, which Frumkin said she delivered "with the finesse of a Betty Furness". Products that she promoted included Kellogg's, Pepsi-Cola, and Tonette.

Heinkel sought, through the show, to make a game of activities such as making beds and washing dishes, "things they'd rather hear from me than from their mothers". Most of the mail that Heinkel received about the show came from mothers, often containing a comment such as "Will you tell Johnnie to take his medicine on your television show? If you tell him, he'll do it."

In 1959 Susan's Show won a local Emmy Award as the best children's program in Chicago. A review of the program in the trade publication Broadcasting said, "What makes this series promising, however, is the poised, polished, professional way in which Miss Heinkel acquits herself." The trade publication Variety described Heinkel in its review of the show as "one of those remarkable multi-talented youngsters who manages to be pretty, poised and glib without cloying." The review added that the show demonstrated sophistication at a level that children would enjoy.

As Heinkel aged, the show was changed from the fantasy of Wonderville. By the time she was 16, it had a format that featured her telling stories and singing songs. She said, "I guess you would just call me a babysitter." Her final appearance on Chicago television occurred in 1960, after which she moved back to St. Louis.

Other TV shows on which Heinkel appeared included The Ed Sullivan Show.

=== After Susan's Show ===
In her late teenage years Heinkel explored possibilities of expanding her career in entertainment. At 17 she had a screen test with Columbia Pictures in Hollywood. She traveled to New York, looking into options on stage and national TV. Some of what she experienced in those sessions clashed with her personal values. She said, "I didn't care for a lot of what I saw in both places. I saw some things that I didn't approve of. ... I had been sheltered by my parents and TV producer, and I was a little shocked at some things." Heinkel's experiences with a talent agency in Chicago also had negative effects. The agency said that she looked too young, too fresh, and too naive. She was told that she would have to change her name, her hair color, and the way she used makeup; she would have to change into an image that the agency would create. Heinkel then decided to go to college to "see if there was something in life that interested me more than what I was doing".

She attended Webster College in Webster Groves and was named to the academic honor roll there. She did not act in the college's theatrical productions, so as not to overshadow the other students who performed. Instead, she worked behind the scenes in areas that included choreography, costume design, directing, lighting, props, scenic design, and sound. During her junior year, Heinkel assisted the college's dance instructor by teaching tap and jazz techniques as part of Webster's prep school dance curriculum in 1965, and she was assistant choreographer when the prep-school students presented the ballet Peter Pan on May 23, 1965. She was one of 12 seniors from the college selected by a vote of students and faculty to be in the 1965-1966 edition of Who's Who Among Students in American Universities and Colleges. Selection was based on leadership, scholarship, and participation in activities. She graduated summa cum laude in May 1966 with a double degree in English and psychology. During her college years she worked in a state mental hospital, providing recreational therapy for children who were emotionally disturbed. She said that activity was "the most taxing and difficult work I've ever encountered" but that it was also "by far the most interesting and rewarding".

=== Young adulthood ===
After Heinkel graduated from college she began teaching ballet at St. Louis-area high schools and teaching ballet, tap, and modern dance in a school that she opened for students ages 4-17. She taught theater and English at Cor Jesu High School, Visitation Academy, and Xavier High School.

=== Industrial shows and commercials ===
While Heinkel was teaching, new professional opportunities emerged. She was asked to model shoes on her 4B "shrimp feet" for two companies. She began doing voice-overs for radio and TV commercials, which in turn led to her performing in person in promotional shows. For four years in the late 1960s and early 1970s she did freelance performances for companies, including Fall City Beer, Illinois Federal, Moog Automotive, Presto-Lite, Rawlings, Sangamo Electric, and Wetterau Foods.

In November 1972 Heinkel joined Lee Hyde (an arranger, composer, and musician) and Audree Darmstatter (a writer of industrial shows) to form the production company S. H. B. & Associates. They hired performers as needed to create industrial shows that combined "song and dance, comedy, color, and excitement" with sales pitches. Each show typically had a theme, often promotion of a product, that was supported by music and skits. Heinkel said that such shows had become key components of sales and advertising for many companies. She noted that her behind-the-scenes experience with collegiate productions had proved invaluable in her new roles of producer and director. By 1979 the company was presenting shows throughout the midwestern United States.

Throughout the 1970s Heinkel continued her work in commercials on radio and TV, making hundreds of them in roles that ranged "from a teenager to a housewife to a wizened old lady". Her variety of dialects and voices made her popular with advertising agencies, as did her ability to quickly memorize a script.

=== Telephone messages ===
Telephone company officials who worked with Heinkel's recording studio in St. Louis liked her voice, a development that led to a new area of employment for her. Beginning in 1986, she recorded 30 to 40 messages per year for Southwestern Bell Telephone Company. They included, "We're sorry, but the number you have dialed is no longer in service. Please check your directory or call the operator for assistance." Such messages freed operators to have more time to deal with situations that needed personal attention. After she semi-retired and moved to Florida she continued to record such messages into the 1990s. When the company introduced new features, such as call forwarding and call waiting, she received scripts and recorded new messages in her home studio. When widespread changes required recording of 100 or more messages at a time, she flew to St. Louis to do the work at a recording studio.

=== Radio programs ===
In 1985 Heinkel produced and co-wrote The Secret of Dominion, a science-fiction adventure series of 13 half-hour episodes. The series used the voices of more than 50 people from the St. Louis area. It was broadcast on WMRY-FM in East St. Louis, Illinois, beginning on January 11, 1987, and syndicated nationally in 1988. In 1987 she wrote and directed Tekakwitha Magi (A Native American Christmas Tale), a Christmas radio drama that was broadcast on a St. Louis station and syndicated to more than 100 stations for use between Thanksgiving and Christmas Eve. Waylon Jennings narrated the program, while all other members of the cast and crew came from in and around St. Louis. After she semi-retired she remained active with Oblate Media of St. Louis, a company that produced and distributed Catholic videos. She wrote scripts for the videos and was a member of the company's media board.

== Personal life ==
On April 8, 1967, Heinkel married George Edward Bayer Jr. They lived in St. Louis until 1989, when he retired from being a vice president of Enterprise Leasing, Incorporated, and they moved to the Florida Keys. She semi-retired at the same time. He died on December 29, 2014.
