= Maximilian Pilzer =

American conductor and violinist

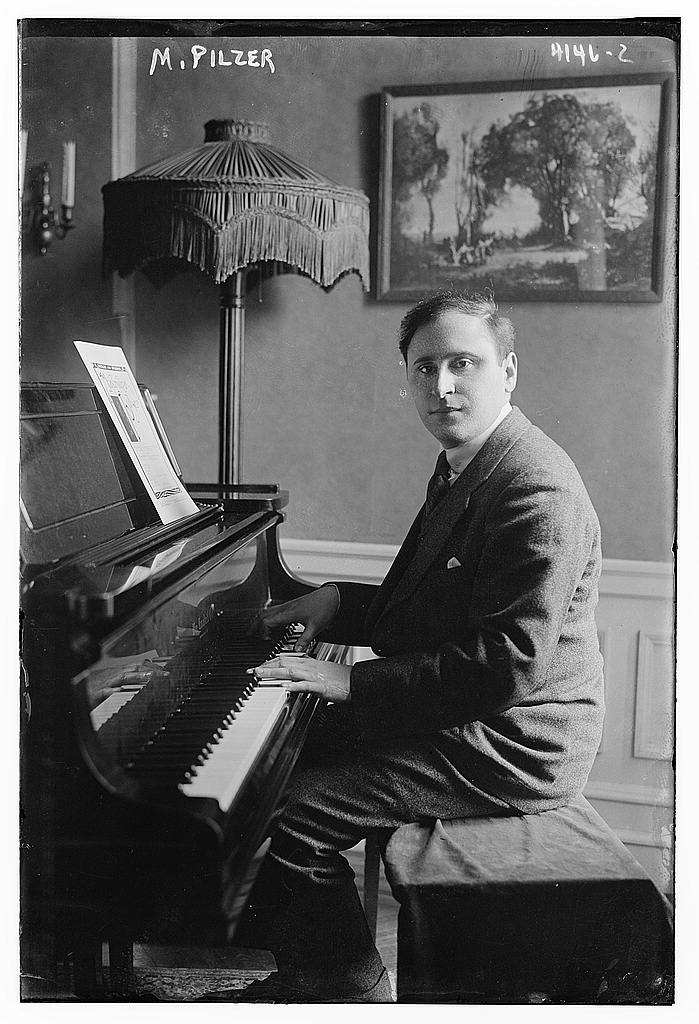
Maximilian Pilzer in 1917

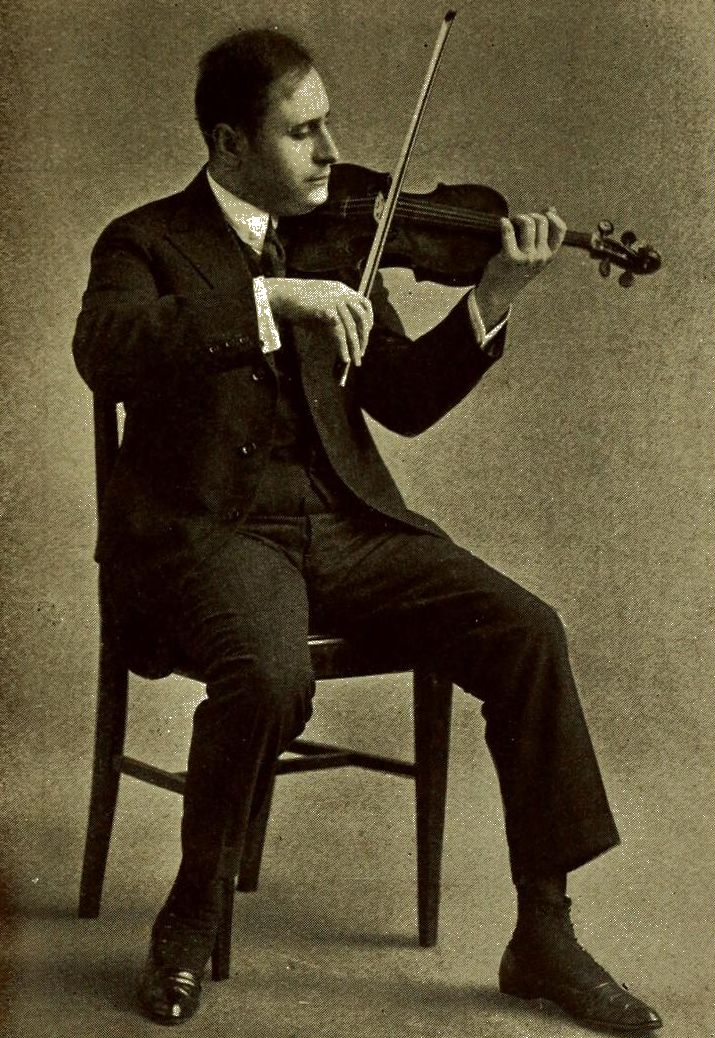
Photo for a book explaining the instruments of the symphony orchestra as concertmaster of the New York Philharmonic

Maximilian Pilzer (February 26, 1890 – May 30, 1958) was a conductor and violinist. He was concertmaster of the New York Philharmonic orchestra from 1915 to 1917. During the years of 1926, 1948 to 1949, and 1958, he conducted the Naumburg Orchestral Concerts, in the Naumburg Bandshell, Central Park, in the summer series. On one such concert, May 30, 1958, Pilzer was conducting before thousands of spectators and a live radio audience. According to The New York Times "Mr. Pilzer was conducting Johann Strauss's gay overture to Die Fledermaus when he fell backward. His head struck the edge of the stage, where there is a strip of concrete." Attempts to revive him were unsuccessful, and Pilzer was pronounced dead on arrival at a nearby hospital.
