= Johnny Crawford =

American actor and singer (1946–2021)

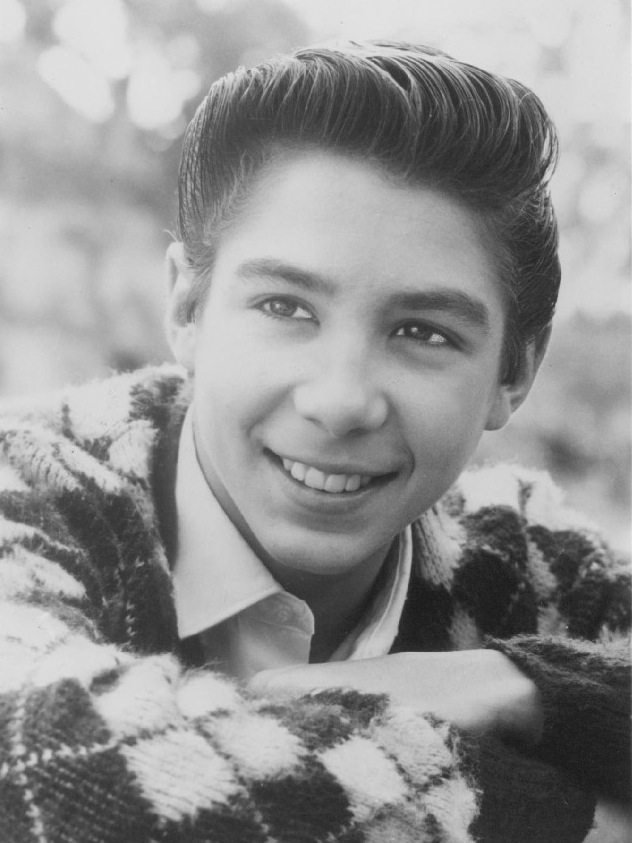
- Crawford in 1963
- Born: John Ernest Crawford; March 26, 1946; Los Angeles, California, US
- Died: April 29, 2021 (aged 75); Los Angeles, California, US
- Occupations: Actor; singer; bandleader
- Years active: 1955–1999; 2019
- Spouse: Charlotte Samco (m. 1995)
- Relatives: Robert L. Crawford Jr. (brother)

John Ernest Crawford (March 26, 1946 – April 29, 2021) was an American actor and singer. He first performed before a national audience as a Mouseketeer. At age 12, Crawford rose to prominence playing Mark McCain in the series The Rifleman, for which he was nominated for a Best Supporting Actor Emmy Award at age 13.

Crawford had a brief career as a recording artist in the 1950s and 1960s. He continued to act on television and in film as an adult. Beginning in 1992, Crawford led the California-based Johnny Crawford Orchestra, a vintage dance orchestra that performed at special events.

== Early life ==
Crawford was born in Los Angeles to Betty (née Megerlin) and Robert Lawrence Crawford Sr. His maternal grandparents were Belgian; his maternal grandfather was violinist Alfred Eugene Megerlin. In 1959, Johnny, his older brother Robert L. Crawford Jr. (a co-star of the series Laramie), and their father Robert Sr. were all nominated for Emmy Awards (the brothers for acting, and their father for film editing).

== Career ==
=== Acting ===
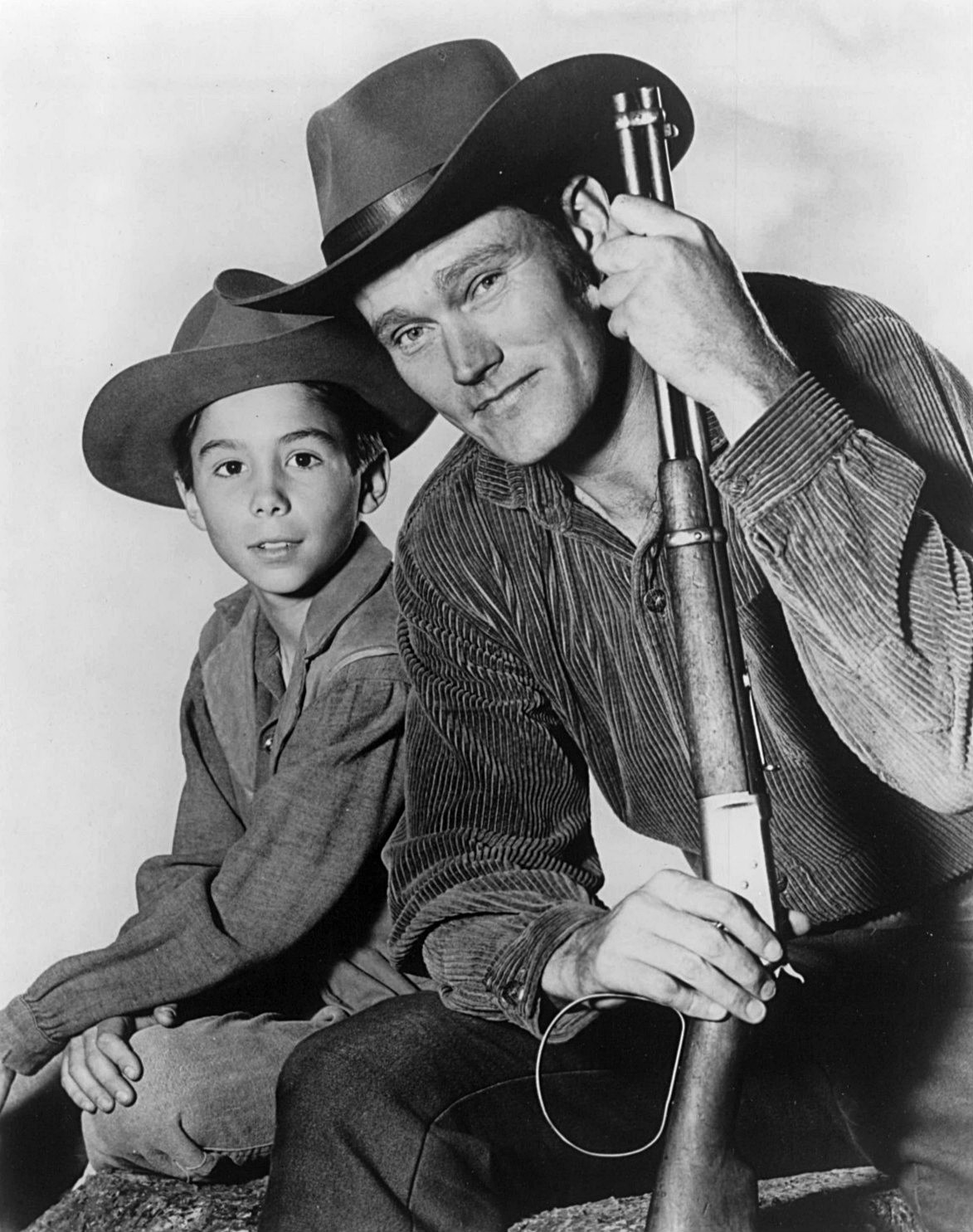
Crawford and Chuck Connors in The Rifleman (1960)

Crawford began his career as a child actor. One of The Walt Disney Company's original Mouseketeers in 1955, he acted on stage, in films, and on television. Disney started out with 24 original Mouseketeers, although at the end of the first season, the studio reduced the number down to 12 where Crawford was cut.

Crawford's first important break as an actor followed with the title role in a Lux Video Theatre production of "Little Boy Lost", a live broadcast on March 15, 1956. He also appeared in the popular Western series The Lone Ranger in 1956 in one of the few color episodes of that series. Freelancing for two and one-half years, he accumulated almost 60 television credits, including featured roles in three episodes of NBC's The Loretta Young Show and an appearance as Manuel in "I Am an American", an episode of the crime drama The Sheriff of Cochise. He starred in the 1958 Season 1 finale of The Restless Gun. He starred as Bobby Adams in the 1958 drama Courage of Black Beauty. He appeared as Tommy Peel in the 1958 episode "The Dealer" in Tales of Wells Fargo.

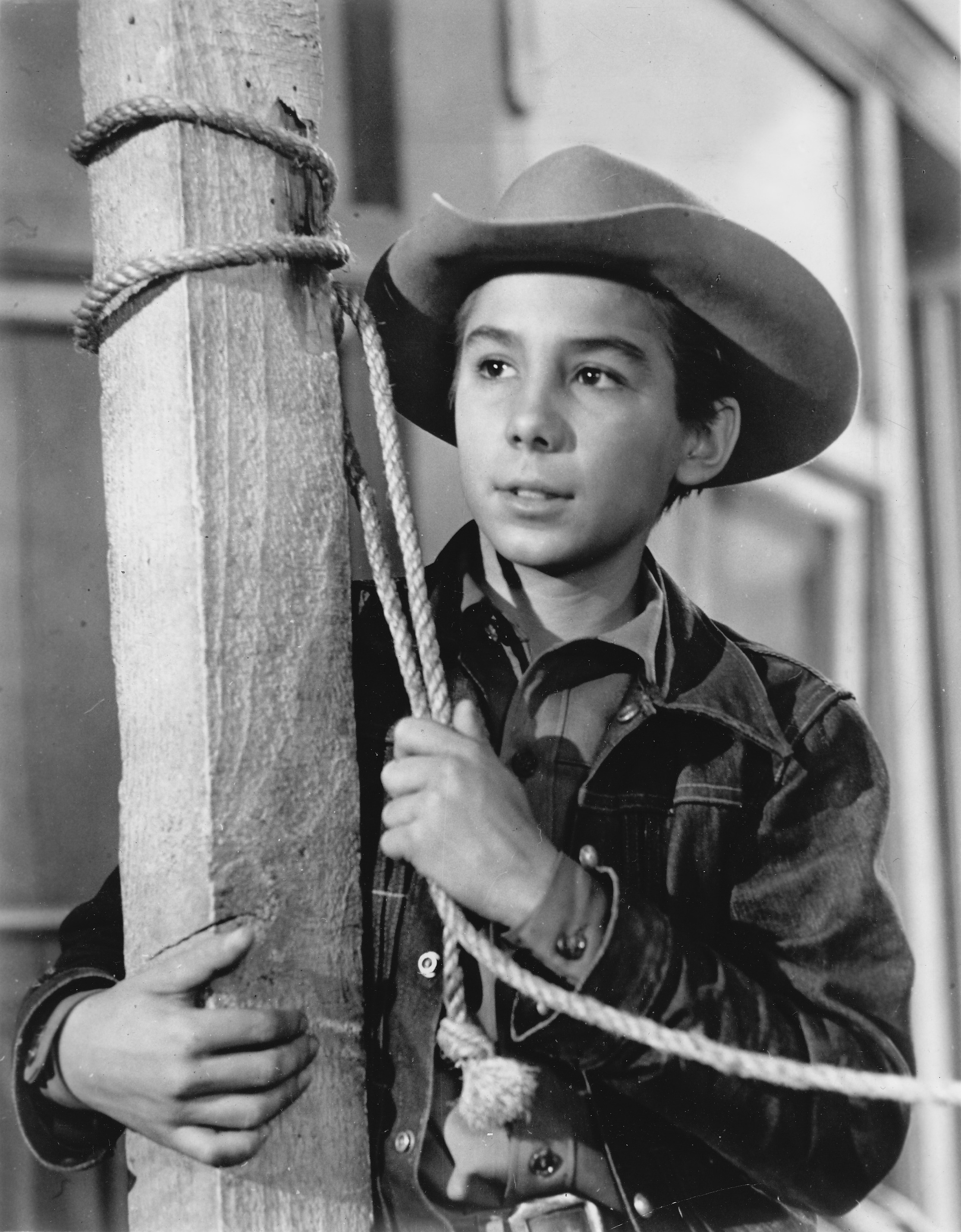
Crawford in The Rifleman in 1961

Crawford was nominated for an Emmy Award as Best Supporting Actor in 1959, at age 13. He received the nomination for his role as Mark McCain (the son of Lucas McCain, played by Chuck Connors) in The Rifleman.

Among his films, Crawford played an American Indian in the adventure film Indian Paint (1965). He played a character involved with a disturbed young girl played by Kim Darby in The Restless Ones (1965), and played a character shot by John Wayne's character in El Dorado (1966). He played young deputy Billy Norris in The Big Valley episode "The Other Face of Justice" in 1969.

=== US Army ===
While enlisted in the US Army for two years, Crawford worked on training films as a production coordinator, assistant director, script supervisor, and occasional actor. His rank was sergeant at the time of his honorable discharge in December 1967. He appeared in an episode of the television series Hawaii Five-O.

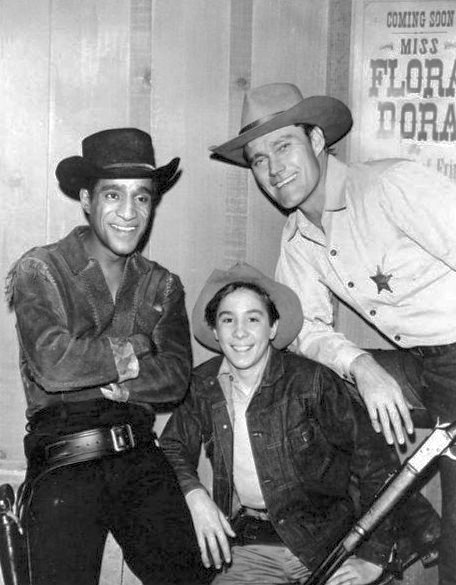
With Sammy Davis Jr. and Chuck Connors in 1962

=== Later acting ===
The Resurrection of Broncho Billy was a student film Crawford agreed to do as a favor to his close friend, producer John Longenecker. It won the 1970 Academy Award for Best Live Action Short Film. Crawford starred with Victoria Principal in The Naked Ape, a partially animated 1973 feature film based on the Desmond Morris book of the same name. Produced by Hugh Hefner, it was a failure which served neither of the performers' careers. In 1976, he appeared in a special 90-minute episode of Little House on the Prairie with Burl Ives.

His final role in a film was playing William S. Hart in the 2019 Western Bill Tilghman and the Outlaws.

=== Musician ===
During the late 1950s and early 1960s, Crawford had wide popularity with American teenagers and a recording career on Del-Fi Records that generated four Billboard Top 40 hits, including the single "Cindy's Birthday", which peaked at number eight in 1962. His other hits included "Rumors" (number 12, 1962), "Your Nose Is Gonna Grow" (number 14, 1962), and "Proud" (number 29, 1963).

Beginning in 1992, Crawford led a California-based vintage dance orchestra, which performed at special events. The formal name of the band was JCO (Johnny Crawford Orchestra). The JCO logo appeared on Crawford's drums when the band played in Las Vegas. The band was sponsored by the Playboy Jazz Festival, and the orchestra has been the choice for 15 consecutive annual Art Directors Guild Awards shows at The Beverly Hilton in Beverly Hills, California. A remastered version of the orchestra's highly rated first album, Sweepin' the Clouds Away, was released on August 21, 2012, on the label CD Baby.

== Personal life ==
Crawford played a key role in the early career of entertainer Victoria Jackson of Saturday Night Live fame. After the two appeared together in a summer stock production of Meet Me in St. Louis, he presented her with a one-way ticket to California and encouraged her to pursue a career in Hollywood. This led Jackson to early appearances on The Tonight Show Starring Johnny Carson, then she was cast as a regular on SNL.

Crawford reconnected with Charlotte Samco, his high school sweetheart, in 1990, and they married in 1995.

In 2019, MeTV reported that Crawford had been diagnosed with Alzheimer's disease. His longtime friend, actor Paul Petersen, started a GoFundMe fundraiser to help cover Crawford's medical costs. Crawford died in a personal care home on April 29, 2021, at age 75, after contracting COVID-19 and then pneumonia before later succumbing to Alzheimer's disease.

== Singles ==
Year	Single (A-side, B-side) Both sides from same album except where indicated	Chart positions		Album
Year	Single (A-side, B-side) Both sides from same album except where indicated	US	CAN	Album
1961	"Daydreams" b/w "So Goes the Story" (Non-album track)	70	–	The Captivating Johnny Crawford
1961	"Your Love Is Growing Cold" b/w "Treasure"	–	–	The Captivating Johnny Crawford
1962	"Patti Ann" b/w "Donna"	43	16	The Captivating Johnny Crawford
1962	"Cindy's Birthday" b/w "Something Special"	8	14	A Young Man's Fancy
1962	"Your Nose Is Gonna Grow" b/w "Mr. Blue"	14	6	A Young Man's Fancy
1962	"Rumors"^{A} b/w "No One Really Loves a Clown"	12	15	Rumors
1963	"Proud" b/w "Lonesome Town" (from Rumors)	29	29	His Greatest Hits
1963	"Cry on My Shoulder" b/w "When I Fall in Love" (from His Greatest Hits Vol. #2)	126	–	Rumors
1963	"What Happened to Janie" b/w "Petite Chanson" (from Rumors)	–	–	His Greatest Hits Vol. #2
1963	"Cindy's Gonna Cry" b/w "Debbie" (from A Young Man's Fancy)	72	13	His Greatest Hits Vol. #2
1964	"Judy Loves Me" b/w "Living in the Past" (from Rumors)	95	16	His Greatest Hits Vol. #2
1964	"Sandy" b/w "Ol' Shorty" (Non-album track)	108	23	His Greatest Hits Vol. #2
1965	"(Once Upon a Time) The Girl Next Door" b/w "Sittin' and a Watchin'" (from A Young Man's Fancy)	–	27	His Greatest Hits Vol. #2
1965	"Am I Too Young" b/w "Janie Please Believe Me" (from Rumors)	-	–	Non-album tracks
1967	"Angelica" b/w "Everybody Has Their Day"	-	–	Non-album tracks
1968	"Everyone Should Own a Dream" b/w "Good Guys Finish Last"	-	–	Non-album tracks

- ^{A}Also peaked at No. 2 in Billboard Adult Contemporary charts.
