= Kim Winona =

American actress

- Winona in Brave Eagle (1956)
- Born: Constance Elaine Mackey; October 10, 1930; South Sioux City, Nebraska
- Died: June 23, 1978 (aged 47); Los Angeles, California
- Other names: Constance M. Marlow, Connie Buck
- Occupation: Actress
- Children: 2

Kim Winona (born Constance Elaine Mackey; October 10, 1930 – June 23, 1978), also credited as Connie Buck, was an American actress, mostly playing Native American roles in Western television programs.

== Early life ==
Winona was born Constance Elaine Mackey in South Sioux City, Nebraska, the daughter of Elaine G. Melior. She lived in Spokane, Washington, as a girl. She was an enrolled member of the Santee Sioux people, and her mother was active in compiling records of Native American family trees.

== Career ==
Winona worked as a secretary and model when she first lived in Los Angeles. On television she had a regular role as Morning Star in Brave Eagle (1955–1956), of which she explained that "The script writers have never made me say 'Ugh', 'Me catchum this', or 'Me wantum wampum.'" The show was praised for casting several Native American actors in regular roles and for having a Chippewa technical advisor. While in this role, she was a guest marshal of the Hesperia Days parade in Hesperia, California.

As Connie Buck, she also appeared in The Man Called X (1956), Bolt of Lightning (1957), Cheyenne (1958), The Rough Riders (1958), 26 Men (1957–1958), Northwest Passage (1959), Gunsmoke (1959), Black Saddle (1959), Bat Masterson (1960), and Rawhide (1959–1960). She had a role in the film Gun Fight (1961), and was hired to promote the film Apache (1954), despite not appearing in it. She also painted and sculpted.

== Personal life ==
Winona married four times and divorced three times. Her first husband was Harvey L. Buck; they married in 1949 in Spokane. Her third husband was John Gilbert Stewart; they married in 1972 in Los Angeles and divorced in 1976. Her last husband was Charles Marcus "Chic" Sorenson; they married in 1977. She had two daughters, Migan (Mimi) Richman, and Michelle Stewart. Michelle is a young adult and supernatural thriller writer under the pen name Michelle Morningstar. Kim Winona died in 1978, aged 47 years, in Los Angeles.
