= Will You Remember? =

Will You Remember is an early American television series which aired in 1944 starting either June or July, and likely ended in early 1945. Broadcast on CBS station WCBW, it was originally picked up for a season of 13 weeks and appears to have been extended beyond that.

== Reception ==
The December 9, 1944 edition of Billboard magazine reviewed an episode saying "Vera Massey, in Will You Remember?, improved over last week. Tonight her songs and soliloquies were better chosen and faster paced. She was sentimental, not sloppy. New twist had her at a window talking to her overseas husband. As she turned to walk to the piano, stagehands noise-lessly removed the wall and window, and camera moved in while the other (inside the room) took over for a couple of seconds. She had taken only a few steps before camera one caught up and record the rest of her movement from the window. It was a nice touch".

== Episode status ==
Methods to record live television did not exist prior to late 1947, and as such the series is lost.
