= Robert L. Crawford Jr. =

American actor

- Born: Robert Lawrence Crawford Jr. May 13, 1944 (age 82); Quantico, Virginia, U.S.
- Other names: Bobby Crawford, Bobby Crawford Jr., Robert L. Crawford
- Occupations: Actor, production assistant, associate producer, producer
- Relatives: Johnny Crawford (brother)

Robert Lawrence Crawford Jr. (born May 13, 1944) is an American actor who portrayed the character Andy Sherman on the NBC television series Laramie in 1959 and 1960. He was cast as the younger brother of Slim Sherman, portrayed by John Smith, owner of the fictitious Sherman Ranch and Relay Station twelve miles east of Laramie, Wyoming. Their co-star was Robert Fuller in the role of former gunfighter Jess Harper. Crawford's role on Laramie ended in 1960, when Andy Sherman was shipped off to boarding school. Crawford is sometimes credited as Bobby Crawford Jr., or without the generational suffix as Bobby Crawford or Robert L. Crawford.

== Personal life ==
His father, Robert L. Crawford Sr., is an Emmy-nominated film editor and occasional actor, who portrayed Detective Phil Burns on the syndicated television series, Manhunt.

== Career ==
Before and after Laramie, Crawford appeared in two dozen film and television productions. His television guest appearances included Walt Disney family adventure series Zorro, The Californians, The Donna Reed Show, National Velvet, Dragnet, Combat!, Mr. Novak, Rawhide, The Rifleman, Cheyenne, and Gunsmoke.

In 1959, Crawford's appearance on the CBS anthology series Playhouse 90 was nominated for Best Single Performance on the 11th Primetime Emmy Awards. That year's Emmy Awards also nominated Crawford's younger brother, Johnny Crawford, for his recurring portrayal of Mark McCain, son of Lucas McCain, on The Rifleman.

In the 1970s, 1980s, and 1990s, Crawford was a production assistant, associate producer, and producer on films such as Slaughterhouse-Five (1972), The Sting (1973), Slap Shot (1977), The World According to Garp (1982), and The Parasite (1997).
