= Son of Belle Starr =

1953 film by Frank McDonald

- Directed by: Frank McDonald
- Written by: Jack DeWitt; D.D. Beauchamp; William Raynor
- Produced by: Peter Scully
- Starring: Keith Larsen; Dona Drake; Peggie Castle
- Cinematography: Harry Neumann
- Edited by: Bruce Schoengarth
- Music by: Marlin Skiles
- Production company: Allied Artists Pictures
- Distributed by: Allied Artists Pictures
- Release date: June 20, 1953
- Running time: 70 minutes
- Country: United States
- Language: English

Son of Belle Starr is a 1953 American Western film directed by Frank McDonald and starring Keith Larsen, Dona Drake and Peggie Castle. The film's sets were designed by the art direction was by Dave Milton. It was shot in Cinecolor.

== Cast ==
- Keith Larsen as The Kid
- Dona Drake as Dolores
- Peggie Castle as Julie Wren
- Regis Toomey as Tom Wren
- James Seay as George Clark
- Myron Healey as Sheriff Hansen
- Frank Puglia as Manuel
- Robert Keys as Bart Wren
- I. Stanford Jolley as Rocky
- Paul McGuire as Pinkly
- Lane Bradford as Beacher
- Mike Ragan as Earl
- Joe Dominguez as Pablo
- Alex Montoya as Mexican

== Bibliography ==
- Frank Richard Prassel. The Great American Outlaw: A Legacy of Fact and Fiction. University of Oklahoma Press, 1996.
