= At Home (TV series) =

American TV variety series (1944–1945)

At Home is an American television series that aired on New York City station WCBW from 1944 to 1945. The series was a variety show, one of the first such series produced for American television. Ernie Waxman was the show's pianist. The series ended when the American Federation of Musicians said that Waxman could no longer play for both TV and radio programs. The program was broadcast on Fridays from 8 to 10 p.m. Tony Miner was the producer.

== Format ==
The series presented variety acts. One episode, for example, featured comedian Bernie West, dancer Ronnie Cunningham, singer Vera Pandowsky, guitarist Youl Bryner, and was hosted by Paquita Anderson. A different episode featured dancer Sandra Barrett and juggler Senor Francisco.

Other content of episodes included presenting "entertainment and points of interest" for people visiting New York City, a fashion show, a discussion of sports, analysis of news, a "Will You Remember?" segment, and showing of films related to wartime.

== Episode status ==
Methods to record live television did not exist until late 1947. As such, the series is most likely lost except possibly for still photographs.

== Critical response ==
The trade publication Billboard said that in August 1944 that At Home was "just about one of the best examples of video variety programing this department has ever seen". The review complimented Miner for his direction and the performers "for their poise, fast chatter and definite talents". Flaws that it pointed out included use of three-quarter shots for a dance routine and the use of "uncontrasting gray tones that become monotonous to the viewer".
