= Mark McCain =

Fictional character

- The Rifleman character
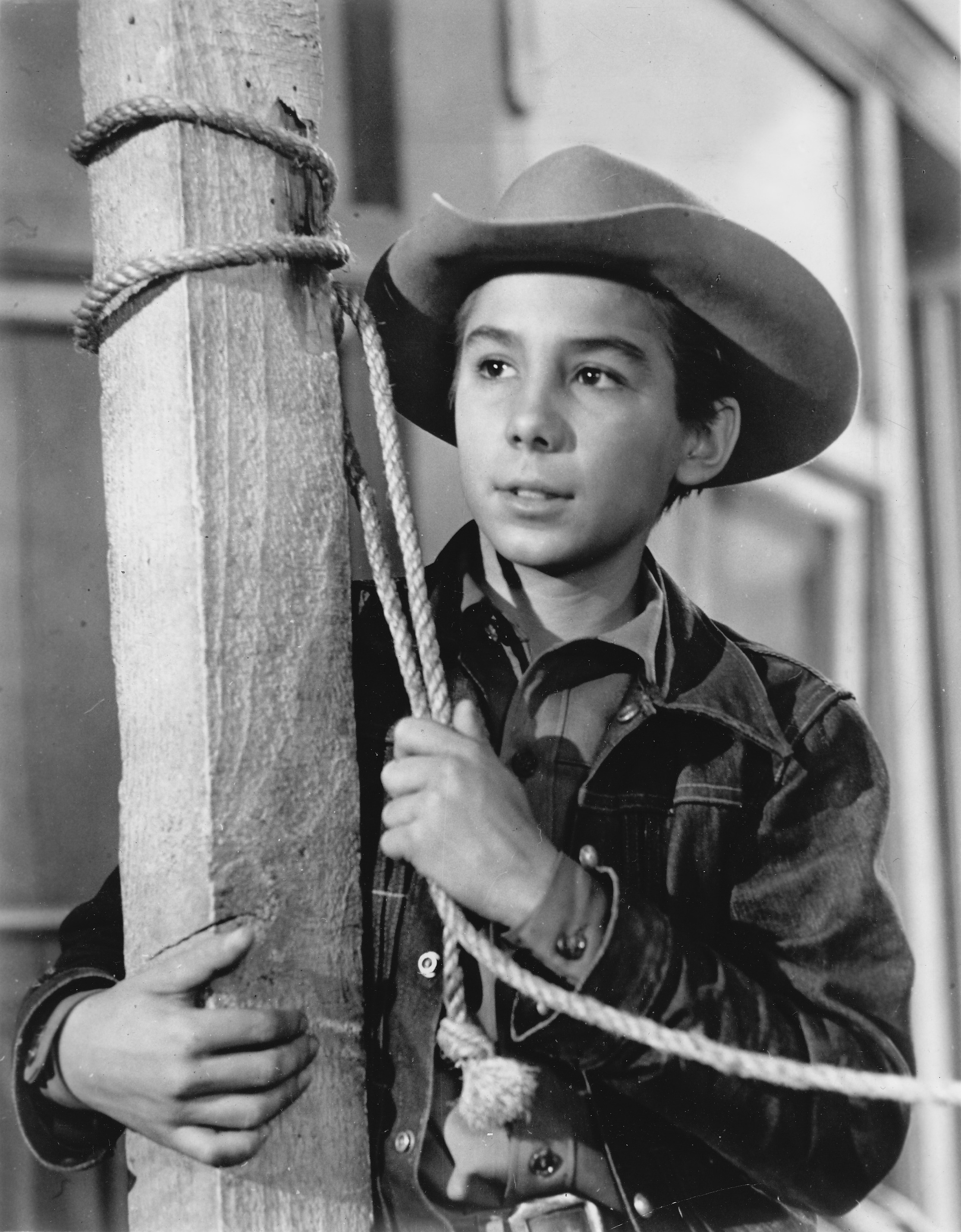
- Johnny Crawford as Mark McCain in a 1961 publicity shot for The Rifleman
- Created by: Sam Peckinpah (uncredited), Arnold Laven Arthur Gardner
- Portrayed by: Johnny Crawford

In-universe information
- Gender: Male
- Occupation: ranch-hand; protege and confidant to his father
- Family: Lucas (father); Margaret Gibbs (mother, deceased); John "Johnny" Gibbs (maternal uncle)
- Nationality: American

Mark McCain is a fictitious character who is the son of rancher Lucas McCain in the ABC Western television series The Rifleman, starring Chuck Connors, which ran from 1958 to 1963. Singer/actor and former Mouseketeer Johnny Crawford was cast in the role and was nominated for an Emmy Award in 1959 as Best Supporting Actor (Continuing Character) in a Dramatic Series. However, Dennis Weaver, then portraying Chester Goode on CBS's Gunsmoke, won the honor.

Mark McCain was more than just a supporting player in The Rifleman, as the boy's bond with his father was a core element of the show. In many ways he was the co-lead of the series and appeared in nearly every episode and in a majority of scenes.

== Family drama ==
The McCains had previously lived in Enid, long before Oklahoma statehood in 1907. While there, Lucas' wife Margaret died in a smallpox outbreak (Season 5, "The Guest"). Mark meets the spirit of his dead mother (played by Marian Seldes) in The Vision (Season 2, Episode 26, originally aired March 22, 1960) when the boy is suffering from typhoid and in a heavy fever.

Despite the legendary Lucas McCain's use of his lightning rifle to settle disputes, the program is family-oriented. Lucas struggles to instill proper values in his young son, and most episodes end on an uplifting note.

In the episode, "The Sister", Mark asked Lucas if he would remarry. Lucas replied that it was "only natural" for him to consider a second marriage. Mark asked when Lucas might marry again. He reassured Mark: "When I find the right woman". Mark asked what the qualifications would entail. Lucas told Mark that he would know the right woman when he met her. With a big grin on his face, Mark asked, "What will she be like"? Lucas replied, "Well, she'll have to cook and sew and scrub. Her hands gotta be soft, she's gotta have hair like the crimson of the setting sun. Eyes as brown as chestnuts. She's gotta wear a flower because that's womanly. Ride a horse like a man". Mark suggested such a woman would be "kinda hard to find". Lucas agreed: "Very hard to find, son". As it turns out, Lucas did not remarry during the run of the program. However, in the last season, he was for a time smitten by a beautiful hotel owner named Lou Mallory.

In the fifth episode of the series entitled "The Brother-in-Law" (October 28, 1958), Jerome Courtland plays Johnny Gibbs, the brother of Luke's late wife Margaret. In the story line, Johnny, a former rodeo rider, visits the McCain ranch and asks Lucas for money so that Gibbs can repay creditors. Lucas then finds a wanted poster on Johnny for robbing an express office. Johnny is trying to raise money in competition to remain on a bucking bronco for thirty seconds. Johnny exerts considerable influence over his nephew, Mark. Though Lucas is initially displeased, he soon finds that Johnny has redeeming qualities though headed to prison when he leaves the McCain ranch.

Western film and TV scholar Holly George-Warren has said, "With its father-son dynamic, The Rifleman bridged the early, innocent Westerns like Hopalong Cassidy and The Gene Autry Show with the more violent, adult Westerns such as Gunsmoke and Bonanza. It was a wonderful family show but had its dramatic elements, too."

== Sam Peckinpah ==
Sam Peckinpah, the author of the first episode of The Rifleman, "The Sharpshooter," is generally acknowledged as one of the creators of the series. He wrote five episodes (three of which he also directed) in the first season, and he wrote and directed an episode in the second season.

According to Christopher Sharrett in his 2005 book The Rifleman, "Peckinpah apparently wanted the series to focus on Mark, so that the series would be kind of bildungsroman, showing, in Peckinpah’s words, Mark’s 'discovery of what it’s all about.' Peckinpah’s vision, which would later show up in his films, was an “... essentialist, reductionist view of a violent world, one beset by the vile appetites of a new technocracy that was opposed by the hopelessly compromised yet relatively moral few. Such a vision … was not acceptable in any form to 1950s commercial television." To have realized Peckinpah's vision would have necessitated … "Mark's growth, maturation, possible disillusionment. The Rifleman indeed dealt with Mark's growing up ... but rather than show a consistent series of bitter trials from Mark's point of view, the show's stories often were constructed as lessons in growing up."

According to Arnold Laven, "… Peckinpah's departure from the show was based less on philosophical differences than on Peckinpah’s insistence on a level of violence that the producers felt distasteful and unsuited to their concept."

In a Playboy Magazine interview with Peckinpah published in August 1972, William Murray, in his introduction, said that Peckinpah "... resigned when 'The Rifleman' became a 'children's program'...."

== Fathers and Sons ==
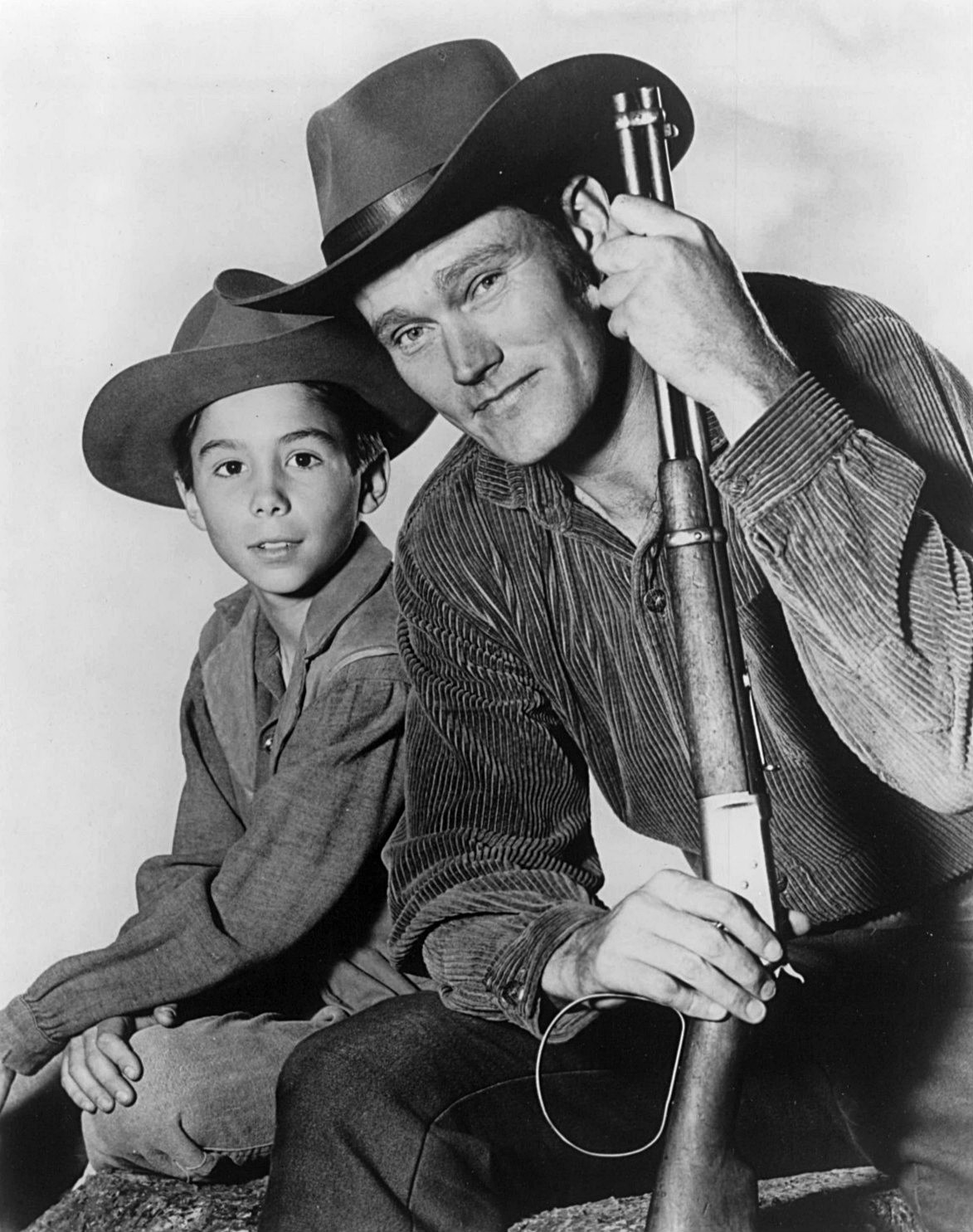
Mark McCain with father Lucas (played by Chuck Connors)

The Rifleman was unique for its time in making its protagonist a widower with a son, and thus burdening him with family responsibilities. This theme became more emphasized as the show developed in its five seasons, not only as a counterpoint to the violence of the show (the F.C.C. began pressuring networks to tone down violence in 1961 ), but to elucidate the theme of the introduction of civilization to the West, as Lucas brings Mark up with a respect for the rule of the law and fair play as part of the process of instilling moral values in his son.

The emphasis on the father-son relationship also was a result of the popularity of Johnny Crawford's portrayal of Mark and his chemistry with his father. Holly George-Warren recalled, "I remember me and all my girlfriends having crushes on Johnny."
