= 1931 in television =

The year 1931 in television involved some significant events. Below is a list of television-related events during 1931.

== Events ==
- May 1 – The first wedding is broadcast by television, on New York City's W2XCR.
- June 3 – First television outside broadcast of a sporting event: Baird televises the Epsom Derby horse race in England.
- July 21 – CBS's station W2XAB begins broadcasting 28 hours a week in New York City.
- August – At the Berlin Radio Show, Manfred von Ardenne gives the world's first public demonstration of a television system using a cathode-ray tube for both transmission and reception. Ardenne never develops a camera tube, using the CRT instead as a flying-spot scanner to scan slides and film.
- October 9 – Canada's first television station, VE9EC, begins broadcasting in Montreal, Quebec. VE9EC is owned jointly by radio station CKAC and the newspaper company La Presse.

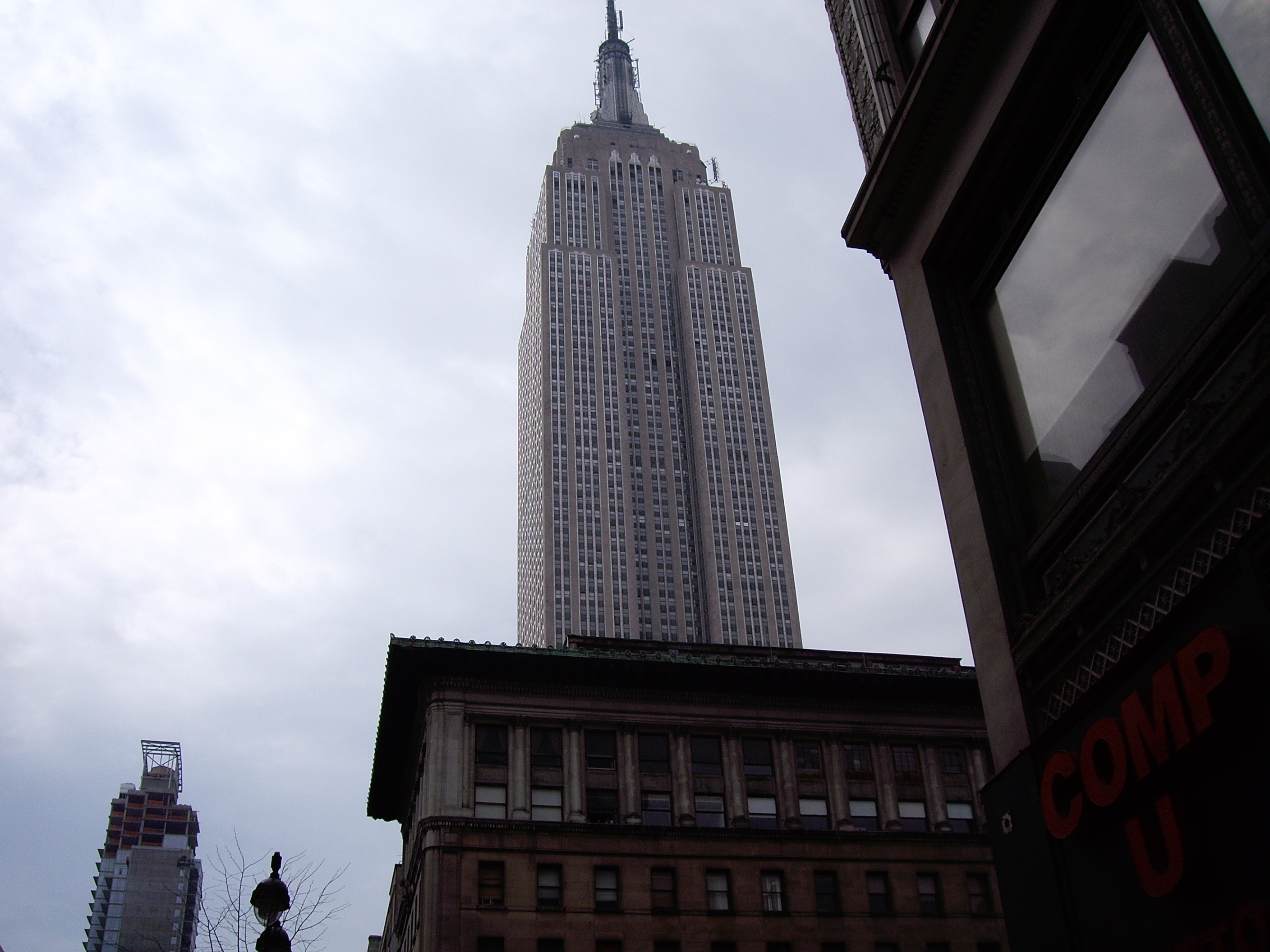
October 30: NBC on Empire State Building which had opened during May.

- October 30 – NBC installs a television transmitter on top of the Empire State Building.
- November 1 – Television images are transmitted from JOAK radio station in Tokyo, Japan by Professors Kenjiro Takayagani and Tomomasa Nakashima. The still images comprise 80 lines at 20 frames per second.
- December 22 – NBC begins broadcasting experimental test transmissions from the Empire State Building transmitter.
- December 23 – Don Lee Broadcasting begins broadcasting low-definition electromechanical television from the station W6XAO (later KTSL) in Los Angeles, broadcasting one hour of film footage, six days per week.

== Debuts ==
- Exhibition Boxing Bouts premieres on the experimental W2XAB (1931–1932)
- Hints for Swimmers premieres on the experimental W2XAB (1931)
- Piano Lessons premieres on the experimental W2XAB (1931–1932).
- The Television Ghost premieres on the experimental W2XAB (1931–1933).
- Television Today premieres on the experimental W2XAB (1931).
- W2XAB debuts music segments with Connie Boswell, Doris Sharp, Elliot Jaffee, Grace Yeager, Harriet Lee, and Helen Haynes, among others.
- W2XCD debuts a semi-regular segment with singer Alice Remsen.

== Television shows ==
Series	Debut	Ended
Alice Remsen	1931	1931
Doris Sharp	1931	1932
Exhibition Boxing Bouts	1931	1932
Elliot Jaffee	1931	1932
Grace Yeager	1931	1932
Helen Haynes	1931	1932
Hints for Swimmers	1931	1931
Piano Lessons	1931	1932
The Television Ghost	1931	1933
Television Today	1931	1931

== Births ==
- January 4 – Rosemary Prinz, U.S. actress (As the World Turns)
- January 10 – Marlene Sanders, television news correspondent (died 2015)
- January 11 – Peter Baldwin, actor (died 2017)
- January 13
  - Charles Nelson Reilly, actor, game show panelist (died 2007)
  - Rip Taylor, comedian (died 2019)
- January 15 – Thomas Hoving, American museum executive (died 2009)
- January 17 – James Earl Jones, actor (died 2024)
- January 19 – Robert MacNeil, news reporter
- February 6 – Rip Torn, actor (died 2019)
- February 8 – James Dean, actor, East of Eden, Rebel Without a Cause, Giant (died 1955)
- February 13 – Geoff Edwards, game show host (died 2014)
- February 24 – Dominic Chianese, actor
- February 28 – Gavin MacLeod, actor, The Love Boat (died 2021)
- March 11 – Rupert Murdoch, media mogul
- March 20 – Hal Linden, actor, Barney Miller
- March 22 – William Shatner, actor, Star Trek
- March 26 – Leonard Nimoy, actor, Star Trek (died 2015)
- March 27 – David Janssen, actor, The Fugitive (died 1980)
- April 6 – Ivan Dixon, actor, Hogan's Heroes (died 2008)
- April 12 – Betty Clooney, singer (died 1976)
- April 14 – Kenneth Cope, English actor, Coronation Street, Randall and Hopkirk (Deceased) (died 2024)
- April 26 – Bernie Brillstein, agent and producer (died 2008)
- May 15 – Ken Venturi, golfer (died 2013)
- May 16 – Jack Dodson, actor, The Andy Griffith Show (died 1994)
- May 18
  - Robert Morse, actor (died 2022)
  - George Shapiro, producer (died 2022)
  - Don Martin, cartoonist (died 2000)
- May 23 – Barbara Barrie, actress, Barney Miller
- June 8 – Dana Wynter, actress (died 2011)
- June 14 – Marla Gibbs, actress, The Jeffersons, 227
- June 20 – Olympia Dukakis, actress, Tales of the City (died 2021)
- June 26 – Marvin Minoff, American film and television producer (died 2009)
- July 1 – Leslie Caron, actress
- July 6 – Della Reese, actress, singer, Touched by an Angel (died 2017)
- July 8 – Roone Arledge, producer (died 2002)
- July 10 – Nick Adams, actor (died 1968)
- July 26 – Robert Colbert, actor, The Time Tunnel
- July 27 – Jerry Van Dyke, actor, Coach (died 2018)
- July 28 – Darryl Hickman, actor (died 2024)
- August 15 – Janice Rule, actress (died 2003)
- August 23 – Barbara Eden, actress, I Dream of Jeannie
- August 25 – Regis Philbin, talk show host (died 2020)
- September 1 – Beano Cook, American television personality (died 2012)
- September 4 – Mitzi Gaynor, singer, actress
- September 9 – Barbara Lyon, singer, actress (died 1995)
- September 10 – Philip Baker Hall, actor (died 2022)
- September 11 – Bill Simpson, actor (died 1986)
- September 12
  - Bill McKinney, actor (died 2011)
  - Ian Holm, actor (died 2020)
- September 13 – Barbara Bain, actress, Mission: Impossible
- September 17 – Anne Bancroft, actress (died 2005)
- September 19 – Ray Danton, actor (died 1992)
- September 21 – Larry Hagman, actor, I Dream of Jeannie, Dallas (died 2012)
- September 24 – Howard West, TV producer (died 2015)
- September 30 – Angie Dickinson, actress, Police Woman
- October 23
  - Jim Bunning, baseball player and politician (died 2017)
  - Diana Dors, actress (died 1984)
- October 31 – Dan Rather, news reporter
- November 5 – Reese Schonfeld, news reporter (died 2020)
- November 8 – Morley Safer, news reporter (died 2016)
- November 12 – Dick Clair, writer (died 1988)
- November 30 – Jack Ging, actor (died 2022)
- December 3 – Jaye P. Morgan, game show panelist
- December 9 – Paddi Edwards, actress (died 1999)
- December 11 – Rita Moreno, actress
- December 23 – Ronnie Schell, comedian
- December 28 – Martin Milner, actor, Adam-12 (died 2015)
