= 1932 in television =

The year 1932 in television involved some significant events. Below is a list of television-related events during 1932.

== Events ==
- March 9 – The U.S. Federal Radio Commission grants an operating license to Kansas State University in Manhattan, Kansas, for the television station W9XAK.
- August 22 – The BBC starts a regular television service using John Logie Baird's 30-line system. EMI demonstrate electronic television, with as many as 3 times as many lines as Baird's mechanical system, to the BBC.
- December – René Barthélemy starts operating an experimental weekly programme of one hour with a 60-line black-and-white system "Paris Télévision".

== Television shows ==
Series	Debut	Ended
Exhibition Boxing Bouts	1931	1932
Hair Fashions	1932	1932
Piano Lessons	1931	1932
The Television Ghost	1931	1933
Television Magic	1932	1932

== Births ==
- January 3 – Dabney Coleman, actor, Buffalo Bill. (died 2024)
- January 12 – Des O'Connor, television personality and singer (died 2020).
- January 13 – Jon Cypher, actor, Hill Street Blues.
- January 17 – Sheree North, actress (died 2005).
- February 1 – John Hart, retired American television journalist
- February 2 – Robert Mandan, actor, Soap (died 2018).
- February 16 – Gretchen Wyler, actress (died 2007).
- February 23 – Majel Barrett, actress, Star Trek (died 2008).
- February 24 – Jay Sandrich, director (died 2021).
- February 26 – Johnny Cash, singer and actor, The Johnny Cash Show (died 2003).
- February 27 – Elizabeth Taylor, actress (died 2011).
- February 29 – Edward Faulkner, actor (died 2025).
- March 2 – Paul Sand, actor.
- March 19 – Gail Kobe, actress (died 2013).
- April 1 – Debbie Reynolds, actress (died 2016).
- April 4 – John Clarke, actor, Days of Our Lives (died 2019).
- April 25 – William Roache, actor, Coronation Street.
- April 27 – Casey Kasem, broadcast announcer, Scooby-Doo (died 2014).
- April 30 – E. Duke Vincent, American television producer (died 2024).
- May 13 – Gianni Boncompagni, radio and TV presenter and director (died 2017).
- June 17 – Peter Lupus, actor, Mission: Impossible.
- June 22 – Prunella Scales, English actress, Fawlty Towers.
- June 28 – Pat Morita, actor, Happy Days (died 2005).
- July 8 – Brian Walden, journalist, broadcaster and Member of Parliament (died 2019).
- July 31 – Ted Cassidy, actor, The Addams Family (died 1979).
- August 5 – Ja'Net DuBois, American actress, singer and dancer, Good Times (died 2020).
- August 9 – Reginald Bosanquet, journalist and news presenter (died 1984).
- August 15 – Jim Lange, game show host (died 2014).
- September 3 – Eileen Brennan, American actress, Private Benjamin (died 2013).
- September 5 – Carol Lawrence, American actress.
- September 10 – Haim Yavin, Israeli news presenter (died 2026)
- September 14 – Igor Kirillov, Russian news presenter, Tsentral'noye televideniye SSSR (died 2021).
- September 25 – Charles Stanley, American pastor (died 2023)
- September 26
  - Donna Douglas, American actress, The Beverly Hillbillies (died 2015).
  - Richard Herd, American actor (died 2020).
- September 27 – Roger C. Carmel, American actor, The Mothers-in-Law (died 1986).
- October 12 – Dick Gregory, actor (died 2017).
- October 20 – William Christopher, actor, M*A*S*H (died 2016).
- November 4 – Noam Pitlik, director (died 1999).
- November 13 – Richard Mulligan, actor, Soap (died 2000).
- November 20 – Richard Dawson, game show host (died 2012).
- November 22 – Robert Vaughn, actor, The Man from U.N.C.L.E. (died 2016).
- December 18 – Roger Smith, actor, 77 Sunset Strip (died 2017).
- December 20 – John Hillerman, actor, Magnum, P.I. (died 2017).
- December 25 – Mabel King, actress (died 1999).
- December 28 – Nichelle Nichols, singer and actress, Star Trek (died 2022).
- December 29 – Inga Swenson, actress, Benson (died 2023).
