= Doris Sharp =

Doris Sharp is the assumed title of a very early television series starring a vocalist of that name, which aired from 1931 to 1932 on New York City station W2XAB (now WCBS-TV).

== Production ==
Doris Sharp had a 15-minute segment on the station, in which she sang songs. The program appeared frequently in TV listings as simply "Doris Sharp, songs," as W2XAB's schedule was arranged in the manner of a vaudeville program; moreover, the series did not air on a specific day of the week. For example, one episode aired on Monday August 31, 1931 at 8:45 p.m., preceded by a "negro quartet" and followed by a fashion show. A different episode, airing Thursday January 14, 1932 at 8:00 p.m., was the first program on the schedule, followed by "mixed quartet".

In his 1932 study, The Outlook for Television, Orrin E. Dunlap reproduces the station's entire broadcast schedule for two consecutive days, beginning on August 24, 1931. The listing for that evening's 8:45 slot reads "Television Crooner, Doris Sharp, dressed entirely in red. Experiment to show effect of color in television pick-up."

Nothing remains of the series today, as it aired live, and practical methods to record live television did not exist until late 1947.

== Reception ==
The January 29, 1933 edition of the Brooklyn Daily Eagle features an article titled Success via Television. The article stated that "All last summer Doris sang on television. Lookers-in who heard and saw her said she sounded like a female Bing Crosby. They said she was great and should get somewhere". The article states that radio bandleader Harold Stern saw her performing on television and booked her to sing on nationwide radio with his orchestra.

== See also ==
Other TV singers during the early 1930s included:

- Harriet Lee
- Helen Haynes
- Grace Yeager
- Elliot Jaffee
- Alice Remsen
