= 1932 in American television =

This is a list of American television-related events in 1932.

== Events ==
- March 9 - The Federal Radio Commission granted an operating license for the television station W9XAK to the Kansas State University in Manhattan, Kansas. It was the first television station in Kansas.
- April 22- A technical problem in the broadcast of the musical television series Harry Fries and His Musical Saw was reported in the radio section of several newspapers. The eponymous star Harry Fries was wearing a red necktie against a white shirt. The red tie photographed as white on the early TV equipment, resulting in a phone call from a viewer to ask why the performer wasn't dressed properly.
- September 17- The day's edition of The New York Sun contained an announcement for the then-new television series Television Magic. The newspaper article stated that "Edwin Howard will bring vaudeville magic to television" and "card tricks and the difficult needle stunt will be given their initial trial over television".
- Specific date unknown -
  - In 1930, the United States Department of Justice had brought antitrust charges against RCA, General Electric (GE) and the Westinghouse Electric Corporation, arguing that their cross-licensing agreements had in effect created illegal monopolies. In 1932, after much negotiation, the Department of Justice accepted a consent agreement that removed the restrictions established by the cross-licensing agreements, and also provided that RCA would become a fully independent company. As a result, GE and Westinghouse gave up their ownership interests in RCA, while RCA was allowed to keep its factories. To give RCA a chance to establish itself, GE and Westinghouse were required to refrain from competing in the radio business for the next two and one-half years.
  - In 1932, the inventor Vladimir K. Zworykin first presented his iconoscope to RCA. Zworykin did not present the iconoscope to the general public until June 1933. The iconoscope was the primary camera tube used in American television broadcasting from 1936 until 1946, when it was replaced by the image orthicon tube.
  - In 1932, RCA was granted a trademark for the cathode-ray tube (CRT) under the term "Kinescope". It continued to hold rights over the device until it voluntarily released the term to the public domain in 1950.
  - Broadcast of the mechanical television series Hair Fashions in New York City. Featuring Ferdinand Graf, it was a 15-minute program about hair fashions which aired on W2XAB (now WCBS-TV).
