= Lost television broadcast =

Missing television material

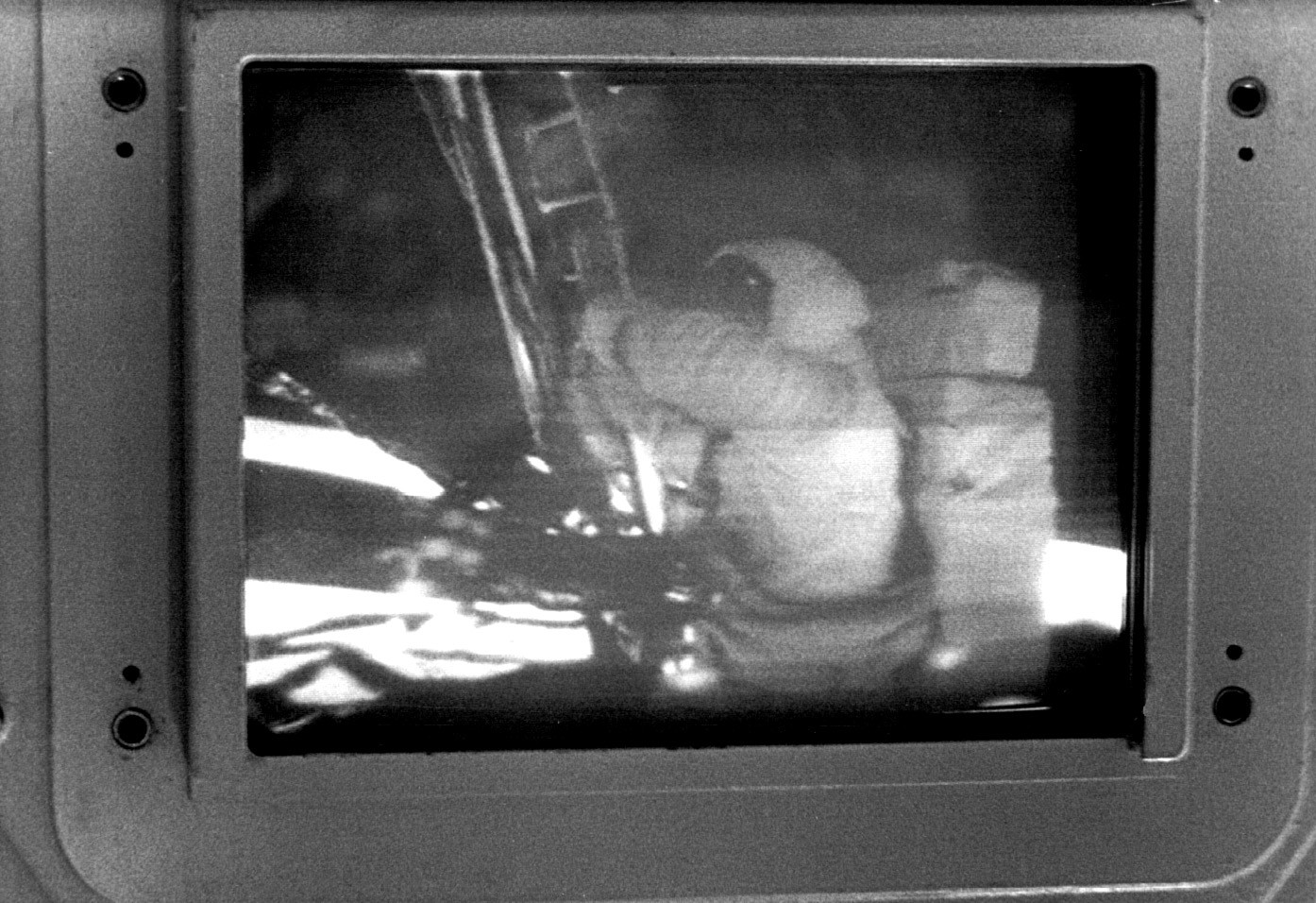
A still image from the original slow-scan television broadcast of the Apollo 11 moon landing, which has since been lost to time.

Lost television broadcasts are television programs that were not preserved after their original airing, rendering them permanently lost. This particularly affects television programs that aired before the widespread use of home video recording and digital archiving. A significant portion of early television programming was never recorded, largely because recording equipment was unavailable or the content was considered to have little monetary or historical value.

== Wiping ==
Wiping and junking are colloquial terms for actions taken by radio, television, production and broadcasting companies to erase or destroy old audiotapes, videotapes, and kinescopes. Although the practice was once typical, especially in the 1960s and 1970s, wiping is much less common today.

== Ongoing recovery efforts ==
=== Australia ===
The majority of locally produced original programing in Australia was funded by the government-owned Australian Broadcasting Commission (ABC). Commercial stations created their own programs, yet by June 1964, the ABC had produced 185 of the 212 plays, all 31 operas, and 90 of the 95 ballets shown on Australian television in that period.

Although many important ABC programs from these early days were captured as kinescopes, most of this material was later lost or destroyed. In a 1999 newspaper article on the subject, author Bob Ellis recounted the story of a large collection of kinescopes of early ABC drama productions and other programs, including some of the first Australian Shakespeare television productions and the pioneering popular music show Six O'Clock Rock. Learning that the ABC planned to dispose of these recordings, Bruce Beresford (then a production assistant at the ABC) arranged for a friend to pose as a silver nitrate dealer, and the anonymous collector purchased the films for a nominal cost. Subsequently, the collector occasionally rented some of the recordings out to schools for a small fee. However, the daughter of one of the actors involved (Owen Weingott), recognized her father from a Shakespeare production and told him about it. Assuming that the ABC still owned the print and was making money out of these recordings without compensating the actors, Weingott lodged an official complaint. Commonwealth police descended on the illegal collector, but he was warned that they were coming, and in a panic, he destroyed almost all the material he possessed.

The National Film and Sound Archive holdings of 1950s-era shows include several episodes of the 1957 discussion series Leave It to the Girls, most of the 1958–1959 soap opera Autumn Affair, and several episodes of the comedy game show The Pressure Pak Show.

=== Brazil ===
From 1968 to 1969, Rede Tupi produced new episodes of the telenovela Beto Rockfeller by recording over previous episodes; as a result, few of the older episodes survived. After the closure of TV Tupi in 1980, the 536 tapes at its São Paulo studios were transported to a warehouse in the São Paulo municipality of Cotia. They were left to deteriorate there until being recovered by the Cinemateca Brasileira in 1985 and subsequently restored by TV Cultura in 1989. Only two Rede Tupi–owned and operated stations are known to have any preserved videotapes; TV Itacolomi's archives are now owned by TV Alterosa, the Minas Gerais affiliate of SBT in Belo Horizonte. In contrast, almost all of TV Piratini's material was lost in a fire in 1983, two years after the building of the extinct station was occupied by TVE-RS, the statewide public television station in Rio Grande do Sul. The few surviving TV Piratini tapes are stored at the Hipólito José da Costa Communication Museum in Porto Alegre, which are in a heavily deteriorated state. Additionally, a number of tapes at the Rede Tupi studios in Urca, Rio de Janeiro, were later found to have been significantly degraded by vinegar syndrome, so they were unable to be migrated to a modern format. However, part of the library of Rio de Janeiro TV Tupi studios was founded in 2005 at the headquarters of Radio Tupi and later donated to the Brazilian National Archive, which signed an agreement with Globo in 2007 to preserve the material.

The public television network Cultura has preserved many old programs and has one of the most complete archives among Brazilian television networks. Despite having suffered a fire in 1986, this fire did not reach the station's archives.

After the bankruptcy of Manchete in 1999, most of the collection was seized at the station's studios in Rio de Janeiro until it was included in the bankruptcy estate and later auctioned by the Brazilian courts, which caused part of the library to be lost. However, some telenovelas (such as Pantanal) had reruns by some television networks (such as SBT and Band).

=== Canada ===
The Canadian Broadcasting Corporation (CBC) has rarely wiped programs it has produced. As a result, the CBC now maintains a nearly complete archive of all programming it produced that was recorded. One exception was the 1953–54 science‑fiction series Space Command, of which only one out of 150 episodes are known to survive. However, the whole series was kined for distribution to stations across Canada. The CBC has also said that the 1984–1993 music video series, Video Hits, no longer exists in their archives. Also, kinescope films of numerous episodes of the CBC quiz show Front Page Challenge were destroyed. They spanned the first 20 years of the series, from 1957 to 1977.

=== Chile ===
During the 1973 coup, the military burned a large portion of the publicly owned Televisión Nacional de Chile (TVN) archives between 1969 and 1973.

Canal 13 (formerly Catholic University of Chile TV) also had programs whose records are lost or never existed because they were only broadcast live. Although Sábado Gigante began in 1962, it only had recorded programs or fragments since the early 1970s. Popular live sitcom El litre 4916, broadcast between 1963 and 1965, was not recorded and had no surviving episodes.

=== Europe ===
The first edition of the Eurovision Song Contest in 1956 was broadcast live on radio and television, but only a partial audio recording of a radio transmission has survived from the original broadcast, with an independently filmed clip of the winner's reprise as the only video available. The ninth edition in 1964 was rumored to have been recorded on tape by DR, the Danish broadcaster and that edition's host nation, but was later destroyed in a fire. However, DR later stated that a recording was never made in the first place, as no tape machines were available at the time. Another recording of the contest was thought to have existed at the French television archives, but it has since been revealed that this is not the case.

==== Belgium ====
Most Flemish youth series from the 1950s were not preserved: Bolletje en Bonestaak (1955), Jan zonder Vrees (John the Fearless, 1956), Schatteneiland (Treasure Island, 1957), Reis om de wereld in 80 dagen (Around the World in 80 Days, 1957), and Professor Kwit (1958). The series Manko Kapak (1959) is an exception and survives on kine. Only three of the 12 episodes of the Flemish courtroom drama series Beschuldigde sta op from the 1960s to 1980 survive.

==== Czechia ====
In 1997, the Czech Television studio archive in Ostrava experienced a devastating flood. The flood destroyed 30,000 news film shots, 6,000 films, 2,000 video tapes, 9,000 scripts, 10,000 photographs, half of the sound archive and the costume department and the props warehouse.

==== Finland ====
In Finland, the law on the archiving of TV programs came into effect in 1984. In 1981, Finland held a televised competition to select their musical entry to the Eurovision Song Contest. The only live performance from their semi-final round is of the Leevi and the Leavings, which was discovered in a private collection recorded on a VHS cassette. The original tape from Yle (the Finnish Broadcasting Company) containing all fifteen acts is lost, although all acts that qualified for the final round are available online. The majority of these annual competitions held between 1961 and 1984 are now lost.

==== Ireland ====
The Republic of Ireland was a latecomer to television, with Telefís Éireann being established at the end of 1961. Although early news broadcasts were recorded on kines, almost all broadcasts up until 1977 are lost. Of the soap opera Tolka Row (1964–1968) only the last episode survives, while almost all the early episodes of The Late Late Show (1962–present) are lost. Even when shows were sent abroad – The Riordans was sent to Australia for rebroadcast – the tapes were often sent back to Ireland and recorded over, as they were so expensive.

==== Netherlands ====
The 1970s Dutch TV series The Eddy-Go-Round Show hosted by Eddy Becker, despite featuring high-profile guests, is reported to have been largely erased by the broadcaster it aired on. However, a short section featuring Swedish pop group ABBA performing "I Do, I Do, I Do, I Do, I Do" was later uncovered on a tape recorded by a home viewer. An additional episode was later uncovered as the host had kept a copy for himself and was later re‑broadcast on a Dutch cable channel in 2012.

==== United Kingdom ====
===== Recording technology and rights =====
Drama and entertainment output was studio-based and followed the tradition of live theatre and radio drama.

The Sunday-Night Play (a major event in the 1950s) was performed live in the studio. On following Thursdays, because telerecording was then of insufficient broadcast quality, another live performance was broadcast, with the artists returning to perform the play again. Black Limelight is a stage play that was adapted for British television three times, with each version being lost. These include a 1952 version as part of Sunday Night Theatre, which was broadcast live and not recorded, a 1956 version as part of Armchair Theatre and a 1962 version as part of BBC Sunday-Night Play.

====== Lost programs ======
Madhouse on Castle Street, a 1963 BBC teleplay starring a then-unknown Bob Dylan, is considered lost. It was erased in 1968, and despite attempts by the British Film Institute to recover it, a telerecorded copy has still not been found as of 2020.

As of 2026, 95 black and white episodes of the BBC science-fiction series Doctor Who are not known to survive, all from the tenures of the first two Doctors, William Hartnell and Patrick Troughton (see Doctor Who missing episodes). Audio recordings survive for all of the lost episodes and have been released commercially by the BBC. Several episodes of some serials, including The Invasion, The Reign of Terror, The Power of the Daleks and The Ice Warriors (all episodes only surviving in audio form), were reconstructed using animation for DVD releases.

The BBC wiped many editions of Not Only... But Also, starring Peter Cook and Dudley Moore from its archives in the late 1960s and early 1970s. Cook and Moore reportedly offered to pay for the cost of preservation and buy new videotapes so that the old tapes would not need to be reused, but this offer was rejected. Some telerecordings of the black and white episodes survive, but the completed programs on color videotape of the 1970 series were wiped. As a result of this, the only surviving color sketches are the 16 mm film inserts.

There is lost material in all genres – as late as the early 1990s, a large number of videotaped children's programs from the 1970s and 1980s were irretrievably wiped by the BBC archives on the assumption that they were of "low priority", without consulting the BBC children's department itself.

====== Other lost material ======
Episodes of the pop music chart show Top of the Pops from its first decade were either wiped or, if transmitted live, not recorded. The Beatles' only live appearance on Top of the Pops in 1966, performing the single "Paperback Writer", is believed to have been wiped in a clear-out in the 1970s. An off-air recording of 11 seconds of footage made on an 8 mm film camera was discovered in April 2019.

Live sporting events such as the 1954 FIFA World Cup also suffered from significant gaps in coverage and preservation. The BBC, which broadcast select matches in the United Kingdom, relied on coverage provided by the transnational Eurovision Network. As a result, coverage of the 1954 tournament was incomplete. The BBC live broadcast selected matches such as Hungary's 8–3 group stage victory over West Germany. But other games, like England's match against Switzerland, were only shown as highlights days later. Additionally only the second halves of two quarter-finals and one semi-final were broadcast live, as were parts of the final between West Germany and Hungary. Competing priorities within the Eurovision Network also meant certain matches were not broadcast at all, such as one semi-final being omitted in favor of an "Agricultural Parade" in Copenhagen. No complete recordings of the tournament are known to exist today.

====== Finding missing BBC programs ======
Since the establishment of an archival policy for television in 1978, BBC archivists and others over the years have used various contacts in the UK and abroad to try to track down missing programs. For example, all BBC Worldwide customers – broadcasters around the world – who had bought programs from the corporation were contacted to see if they still had copies that could be returned; Doctor Who is a prime example of how this method recovered episodes that the corporation did not retain. At the turn of the 21st century, the BBC established its Archive Treasure Hunt, a public appeal to recover lost productions, which has had some success.

The BBC also has close contacts with the National Film and Television Archive, which is part of the British Film Institute and its "Missing Believed Wiped" event which was first held in 1993 and is part of a campaign to locate lost items from British television's past. There is also a network of collectors who, if they find any programs missing from the BBC archives, will contact the corporation with information – or sometimes even the actual footage. Some examples of programs recovered for the archives are Doctor Who, Steptoe and Son, Till Death Us Do Part, Dad's Army, Letter from America, The Likely Lads, and Play for Today.

===== ITV =====
The original (not broadcast) black-and-white recording of the premiere episode of the British series Upstairs, Downstairs (1970–1975) does not exist in any form, with the possible exception of a few stills and the location footage which features at the start of the transmitted shot-in-color rerecording of the episode. The original recording took place on 13 November 1970, and was in monochrome, owing to the so-called Colour Strike, a dispute with studio technicians, who refused to operate colour recording equipment as part of a work to rule. The following five episodes were also recorded in monochrome, before the dispute ended with the recording of episode 6 in colour on 12 February 1971. After the entire thirteen-episode season run had been recorded, it was decided to rerecord the first episode in colour to gain the highest possible audience for its first UK transmission and to help with overseas sales. The re-recording took place on 21 May 1971, and the series' UK debut was on 10 October 1971.

===== Recovery of missing programs =====
It emerged in September 2010 that more than 60 recordings of BBC and ITV drama productions originally sent for broadcast in the United States by the PBS station WNET (which serves New York City and New Jersey) had been found at the Library of Congress.

In 2006, a life-sized Dalek was given to anyone who found and returned one of the missing episodes of Doctor Who. In December 2012, the Radio Times announced it was launching a hunt for more Doctor Who episodes in aid of the show's 50th anniversary, by publishing their own list of missing episodes and setting up a specific address that the public could email if they had any information. In 2013, a Nigerian television broadcasting station announced the discovery of ten 1960s episodes, but only later released nine. Philip Morris, who discovered all ten episodes, speculated that the tenth episode was stolen and sold for a profit before it could be returned to the UK.

===== Preservation of the current archive =====
Live broadcasts in Britain are still not necessarily kept, and wiping of material has not ceased. According to writer and broadcaster Matthew Sweet, there are "big gaps in the record of children's television of the Nineties."

==== Yugoslavia (SFRY) ====
Yugoslav Radio Television (JRT) practiced wiping until the 1970s when it gained access to newer and cheaper methods of recording, which allowed it to regularly archive programming.

=== Japan ===
Of the original 1973 Doraemon, 31 segments are now considered lost. The show only lasted for 26 episodes — it was interrupted due to the dissolution of the production studio Nippon TV Video, which sold off many of the show's reels in an effort to avoid bankruptcy. Twenty-three segments/episodes are known to have survived, two of which have no audio.

All episodes of Osamu Tezuka's anime Big X are reportedly lost, except for episodes one, eleven, and 40–59. Only episodes 37 and 38 of Space Alien Pipi survive, along with the opening and ending theme. Certain episodes of Perman are lost, while some have picture but no audio.

Most episodes of the children's puppet show Hyokkori Hyōtanjima, running from 1964 to 1969 on NHK for total of 1,224 episodes, were reportedly wiped after the broadcast. The tapes were reportedly reused for other programs since video tapes were costly. Six episodes have resurfaced from black-and-white kinescopes, as well as two color episodes.

=== Pakistan ===
In Pakistan, VCR recordings are the only source of footage for some programs.

The Center for Media Psychology Research Pakistan website gives a different story, stating that after the switch to color broadcast, the recording medium in the 1970s was the one-inch spool format which recorded sound and electronic moving pictures as a combined stream on a magnetic recording medium. However, the one-inch magnetic spool containing all old archives was eventually lost.

=== Philippines ===
According to a lawsuit about Roberto Benedicto, it was reported that the equipment, as well as ABS-CBN's 1953 archival footage, were reported missing during a 1979–1980 military inventory in Meycauayan. Some sources mention that they were stored in PTV-4's archives.

=== United States ===
==== Introduction ====
In the United States, major broadcast networks engaged in the practice of wiping recordings of both daytime and late-night shows until the late 1970s. Daytime shows, such as soap operas and game shows, most of which had been taped, were erased because they were perceived as not having continuing commercial value (due to the volume of episodes, rerun syndication of such programming was rarely undertaken). In the early 1970s, the passage of the Financial Interest and Syndication Rules barred the networks from syndicating their own archived programming; intended to encourage more local and independent content, it had the unintended consequence of prompting the networks to discard tapes that syndication companies had no interest in distributing (especially those in black and white).

==== The early years ====
Most of the earliest American mechanical television programs of the early 1930s, including The Television Ghost, Piano Lessons, and variety shows by Helen Haynes and Harriet Lee, are considered lost, as no methods existed to preserve them. Only promotional pictures of the shows still exist.

==== Networks and stations ====
===== CBS =====
Hosting sequences (nearly always featuring celebrities) were sometimes made for telecasts of family films, such as for the first nine telecasts of MGM's The Wizard of Oz by CBS from 1956. It is not known if the sequences made for Oz survived, since they have not been seen since 1967. One hosting sequence from that era, that Eddie Albert made for the 1965 CBS telecast of The Nutcracker, starring Edward Villella, Patricia McBride, and Melissa Hayden, was included on the DVD release of the program and has survived.

===== DuMont =====
The majority of programming from the defunct DuMont Television Network has become lost since the network's final broadcast in 1956. Although the network was a pioneer in recording its programming to kinescope (videotape was not introduced until shortly after the network ceased broadcasting), much of their film archive was later recycled for its silver content or discarded. Most programs aired by the network are either completely lost or have only a handful of episodes preserved.

===== ESPN =====
The first live sporting event broadcast by ESPN was the first game of the 1979 Softball World Series in men's professional slow-pitch softball. Roughly twenty years later, the manager of the Kentucky Bourbons, losers in the series, contacted ESPN about acquiring a copy of that game and was told that this was the only lost broadcast in the network's history. However, it was later found that the owner of the series-winning Milwaukee Schlitz had previously purchased a copy of this broadcast, and still had the tapes in his possession. The tapes were produced and eventually became the centerpiece of an E:60 episode that aired as part of the network's 40th anniversary celebration in 2019.

=== Program types ===
==== Children's programs ====
The Paul Winchell Show, also known as The Paul Winchell and Jerry Mahoney Show, was a children's show hosted by ventriloquist and voice actor Paul Winchell on Metromedia Television's KTTV in Los Angeles. All of the episodes are said to have been lost after station management vindictively erased tapes in 1970 in retaliation after Winchell refused Metromedia's syndication deal and Winchell's offer to buy the tapes for $100,000. Winchell sued Metromedia in 1986 and was awarded $17.8 million, in total for the value of the tapes and in damages against Metromedia. Metromedia subsequently appealed to the Supreme Court, but lost.

==== Comedy, talk shows and music ====
Among the 50 recorded episodes of That Was the Week That Was, on NBC from 10 November 1963 to May 1965, only a few survive in video form, yet audio episodes survive on acetate disc. The first-season black-and-white episodes were preserved on kinescope film; the surviving color episodes of the second and final season were recorded in the then-standard two-inch color quadruplex videotape format. The Paley Center for Media has copies of some seven episodes, including the hour-long pilot. Also, scripts of all shows survive, both in the NBC Collection at the Library of Congress and in the papers of executive producer Leland Hayward at the New York Public Library. Amateur audio recordings of all or nearly all episodes also survive.

The 1951 unaired pilot of the American sitcom I Love Lucy was long believed lost, but in 1990, the widow of actor Pepito Pérez (who played Pepito the Clown) found a copy. It has since been broadcast on television.

==== Game shows ====
The second version of Dream House (NBC, 1983–1984) has only a handful of episodes remaining; the show's master tapes had been destroyed by a flood by 2013.

==== Human interest ====
A number of stories about regular people, such as The Medicine Music Show with Tommy Scott: The American Trail (1978–1983) were lost en masse during the transition from film to video, although the Tommy Scott episode managed to evade being lost to time.

==== News ====
As of 1997, CBS had saved 1,000,000 videotapes of news reports, broadcasts, stock footage, and outtakes according to a report that year from the National Film Preservation Board. The same report added, "Television stations still erase and recycle their video cassettes", referring to local news programs. Many local stations contract with third-party companies for archiving news coverage.

The original slow-scan television footage of the first human moon landing in 1969, believed to be of significantly higher quality than the standards-converted version broadcast on TV, is missing from NASA's archives.

==== Soap operas ====
The Young and the Restless, Dark Shadows, and Ryan's Hope saved most of their episodes, despite the fact that they debuted during the 1960s and 1970s before retaining tapes became common practice. Episodes of The Doctors began to be saved no later than 4 December 1967; this is where reruns of the series began when picked up by Retro TV in September 2014, and distributor SFM Entertainment claims to have roughly 95% of the series' episodes intact in its library. However, the episodes from the final two years of The Doctors are now believed to be lost. Episodes of other soaps broadcast during the 1950s to the 1970s do exist in different forms and have been showcased in various places online.

==== Sporting events ====
===== National Football League (NFL) =====
Super Bowl I was aired by both CBS and NBC (the only Super Bowl to be aired by two networks), but neither network then felt the need to preserve the game long-term; CBS saved the telecast for a few months and re-ran it as filler programming at least once before wiping it. A color videotape containing the first, second and fourth quarters of the telecast from WYOU (the CBS affiliate for Scranton, Pennsylvania, which was then WDAU-TV) was found in 2005 and is in the process of being restored. On 15 January 2016, the NFL Network re-aired the first Super Bowl, featuring audio from the NBC Radio Network and most of the TV network broadcast and newly discovered NFL Films footage of the game. Super Bowl II was aired exclusively by CBS and was long believed to have been erased, but it was later found that the entire telecast fully exists and rests in the vaults of NFL Films.

===== World Series telecasts =====
All telecasts of all World Series games starting in 1975 (Reds–Red Sox) are known to exist in full. What follows is the known footage of World Series telecasts prior to 1975:

- 1952 (Yankees–Dodgers) – Games 6–7 are intact.
- 1955 (Yankees–Dodgers) – Only the first half of Game 5 is known to exist.
- 1956 (Yankees–Dodgers) – Only the last three innings of Game 2 are known to exist. Game 3 is intact minus the second and third inning. Game 5 (Don Larsen's perfect game) is intact minus the first inning, and was aired on 1 January 2009, during the MLB Network's first broadcast day.
- 1957 (Yankees–Braves) – Game 1 is intact by way of a print from the United States Armed Forces Radio and Television Service. Game 3 is intact, minus a snip of Tony Kubek's second home run in the top 7th inning. Games 6 (most of the first six innings) and 7 reportedly exist as well.
- 1960 (Yankees–Pirates) – Game 7 (with Bill Mazeroski's series winning home run) was found intact on kinescope in December 2009 in the wine cellar of Pirates' part-owner Bing Crosby, who had the game recorded at his own expense. MLB Network aired it in December 2010.

== Select list of TV programs with missing episodes ==
name	date	description
The Adventures of Twizzle	1957	Every episode of the series is believed to be lost forever except for the first episode.
Audrey and Friends	2002	A British children's show that aired on 5's Milkshake! and Shake! blocks, of which only the pilot, some screenshots, and part of the episode "Away" have resurfaced.
Baffle	1973–1974	American word-guessing game show. Only three out of 100 episodes still exist.
Barley Charlie	1964	Australia's third-ever sitcom. Out of the 13 episodes produced for the series, only 3 are available.
The Beagles	1966–1967	Total TeleVision's last cartoon show, of which only one color episode is known to exist whilst two others are sourced from kinescopes. Despite all the show's negatives having been found in a warehouse in the 1990s, their whereabouts remain unknown due to Joe Harris' passing in 2017. All that remains outside of this material are various animation cels alongside the show's soundtrack.
The Bear Bryant Show	1958–1982	One of the first college football coaches' shows; over 250 episodes were made during Bear Bryant's tenure at the University of Alabama. Early episodes were aired live and not recorded; videotape began to be used in the 1970s, but was routinely wiped. Less than a third of the run, 77 episodes in all, survives.
Beat the Clock	1950–1958	From March 1950 to July 1952, no live broadcasts of the show were preserved with two exceptions: one episode from 13 October 1951, and another from 5 January 1952. The first one is a "public domain" episode, the second exists at the Paley Center for Media in New York City. The show was not regularly preserved until August 1952, and that is when the earliest known episodes of the show in GSN's catalog begin.
Beulah	1950–1953	Only seven episodes have survived.
Block 13	2000–2003	The last episode of season 3, "Finale", originally broadcast in November 2002, is partially lost. Parts of it are on YouTube.
Camel News Caravan	1948–1956	An early news program, most of the episodes of the program are believed to be lost to time.
Captain Video and His Video Rangers	1949–1955	Almost the entire run was destroyed after the DuMont Television Network ceased to exist; 26 episodes remain.
Cavalcade of Stars	1952–1957	Popular variety series; dozens of episodes were destroyed in the 1970s.
Coke Time with Eddie Fisher	1953–1957	Many episodes have been lost, although some (such as one starring Florence Henderson) have survived. The series was simulcast. All or most of the episodes only survive in audio form.
Countdown	1974–1987	Numerous episodes between 1974 and 1978, including the first episode, were accidentally erased by ABC in the late 70s.
Criswell Predicts	1950s	No material of this Los Angeles–based program exists outside of a re-creation that was made for the film Plan 9 from Outer Space.
Curiosity Shop	1971–1973	The majority of the pilot episode (aired in prime time) and series finale exists, while the second episode is held at UCLA's archives; most other material from the series is presumed lost.
Doctor Who	1963–present	Ninety-five episodes produced as part of the first six seasons are currently lost due to the BBC's policy of erasing and reusing video tapes to save on production costs. All of the missing episodes survive as homemade audio recordings, and some are believed to still exist as telerecordings that were created for international broadcasts of the series. Reconstructions of various episodes have also been created from the surviving audio, ranging from slideshows of recovered stills to digitally animated remakes. Every episode produced from 1970 onwards has been properly archived, and the series otherwise continues to be widely distributed.
Dollar a Second	1953–1957	Only two episodes have survived. A third kined program exists in the J. Fred & Leslie W. MacDonald Collection of the Library of Congress.
Doorway to Fame	1947–1949	One of the first "talent shows" aired on United States television, only two episodes survive.
Dream House	1983–1984	Only a small number of episodes are known to survive after the original tapes were destroyed in a flood.
Eat Bulaga!	1979–present	The longest-running noontime variety show in the Philippines. There are still many episodes from 1979 to 1981, including when the show was still produced by Production Specialists, Inc., which are considered to be lost.
Emmerdale Farm	1972–present	An ITV strike in late 1981 resulted in six episodes set to be broadcast in November and December 1981 not being aired at all. ITV had never shown these episodes and they are believed to have been wiped.
Enjoy Yourself Tonight	1967–1994	Some early episodes were erased by TVB.
Family Affairs	1949–1950	None of the six episodes of this, the first television serial remain, as they were not archived by the BBC.
Faraway Hill	1946	No footage, stills, or scripts survive from this program, which was the first soap opera aired on American television.
Gambit	1972–1976	More than 1,000 episodes appear to be lost.
The Goldbergs	1949–1956	Only the last two seasons survive intact, with the CBS and NBC runs being largely lost.
The Good Night Show	2005–2016	Several episodes and segments appear to be lost.
Hour Glass	1946–1947	No footage remains of U.S. television's first network variety show, but audio recordings and some still photographs do.
In Melbourne Tonight	1957–1970	Hundreds of episodes no longer exist.
It's Alec Templeton Time	1955	One of the last DuMont series. Although Alec Templeton was a celebrity of some note, no episodes exist of the televised version of his program.
Jeopardy!	1964–1975	Whilst the current syndicated version of the show is largely archived, less than 1% of the episodes hosted by Art Fleming are available.
Joy Junction	1979	Almost all episodes of the Christian children's series are lost due to the show airing no reruns and being pulled from broadcasting because of allegations against presenters.
Jul og Grønne Skove	1980	Jul og Grønne Skove was a Christmas calendar originally broadcast on Danish television by DR. Half of the 24 episodes were wiped some time in the mid-1980s, as were many of DR's productions made before 1987, when DR made an agreement with Statens Mediesamling to archive all future productions.
The Let's Go Show	2007–2008	Thirty episodes have been confirmed to exist; the songs from the first two episodes, "Safari" and "The Moon" and quick clips from the episodes "Park" and "Library" have resurfaced, as has audio from a ballet-related episode, though the rest of the series is lost, despite there being lyric pages for the songs, some of which have been uploaded on SoundCloud, and behind-the-scenes footage on Facebook of the "Concert" and "Fiesta" episodes. Additionally, there are five unconfirmed episodes – "Wild West", "Beach", "Baseball", "Slumber Party", and "Parade", listed on composer Tim Burns' ASCAP account.
Lucky 7	14–16 April 1978	Due to having an extremely short lifespan at a time when home video recording was in its infancy, no footage of this pirate TV network is known to survive.
Macy's Thanksgiving Day Parade	1953–present	Of all parades that were telecast on NBC before 1981, only two are known to have survived in their entirety; several others are only known to survive in the form of audio recordings. In addition, a large majority of CBS' telecasts are presumed lost as well.
The Magnificent Marble Machine	1975–1976	An American game show hosted by Art James; only two episodes still exist.
Mama	1949–1957	The vast majority of the episodes produced of this series no longer exist.
Mary Kay and Johnny	1947–1950	The series was originally broadcast live and not recorded, but began using kinescopes in 1948. Many episodes from the latter period still existed as late as 1975, but only one complete 1949 episode (in the Paley Media Collection) and a few seconds from the show's last few episodes still exist today.
The Match Game	1962–1969	Approximately eleven NBC network episodes survive out of the 1,752 episodes produced.
Melodies and Rhythms of Foreign Pop	1977–1984	Melodies and Rhythms of Foreign Pop is a Soviet TV music show, dedicated to the international rock and pop music. Out of 59 episodes, broadcast by Channel 1 from 1977 to 1984, only one episode of 1982, dedicated to the memory of Joe Dassin, survived in the archives.
Mindreaders	1979–1980	Only around two episodes are known to survive, even though wiping had been largely phased‑out by the "Big Three" United States networks at the time.
Mio Mao	1971–2006	Early 1971–1977 episodes are lost, with one surviving.
Newsweek Views the News	1948–1950	A prime-time public-affairs program featuring editors of Newsweek magazine discussing current events; only two episodes survive.
Number 96	1972–1977	Most of the black and white episodes were destroyed by Network Ten as they were deemed not as marketable as the colour episodes.
Opera Cameos	1953–1955	One of several "cultural" programs aired by the DuMont Television Network as counter-programming, only eight episodes survive of the 50+ episodes produced.
The Pinky Lee Show	1954–1955	Few episodes of this critically acclaimed TV series have survived.
Puttnam's Prairie Emporium	1988–1990	The master tapes were reportedly wiped by CKCK-TV in the early 1990s. A single episode (an outtakes and bloopers special), and a few minutes from one other are known to survive.
Queen for a Day	1956–1964	Almost every episode of this popular TV series was destroyed.
Rocky King Detective	1950–1955	Original negatives were dumped into Upper New York Bay in the 1970s.
Sale of the Century	1969–1973; 1983–1989	Only two audio recordings from the show's original NBC run are known to have survived. In addition, many episodes from the Reg Grundy revival are missing as well.
Sara and Hoppity	1962–1963	The master tapes are believed to have all been lost or destroyed. The pilot version of the first episode of Sara & Hoppity was discovered in a 16 mm print along with the 16 mm film reels of all 39 episodes of Space Patrol in possession of Roberta Leigh in the late 1990s. One other episode is known to have been found, while only one minute of silent footage from another was found.
The School House	1949	Only one episode has survived from early 1949 of this DuMont show, featuring Wally Cox (flubbing his lines in a live DuMont TV set commercial) and Arnold Stang with musical performances set in a high school classroom.
Search for Tomorrow	1951–1982	Thousands of episodes of this series no longer exist due to wipes done by CBS. However, the J. Fred & Leslie W. MacDonald Collection of the Library of Congress has three kinescopes from 1953, one from 1954, and 39 from May to August 1966.
Sense and Nonsense	1954	Only one episode survives of this WABD series.
Sixpenny Corner	1955–1956	The only soap opera ever made by Associated-Rediffusion, and the first British serial to be broadcast on a non-BBC channel is believed to have been completely destroyed.
Snap Judgment	1967–1969	A game show believed to be completely wiped from the NBC archives.
Starlight	1936–1949	The first ever variety show transmitted anywhere in the world, and the BBC's first ever program. BBC did not have access to means of recording until late 1949, so no footage is known to exist of this show today.
Student Canteen	1958–1990	The Philippines' first noontime variety show. There are still many episodes, including when the show has aired on ABS-CBN and RPN, which are considered to be lost.
The Tammy Grimes Show	1966–1967	All surviving episodes are sourced from black and white kinescope copies. The fifth, titled "The Great Charge Account War", was not broadcast on ABC due to its cancellation and has not been seen by the public.
The Television Ghost	1931–1933	As the show was broadcast at such an early point in television history, no footage of any episode is believed to exist.
The Tonight Show Starring Johnny Carson	1962–1972	Only thirty-three 1962–1972 episodes have survived erasure by NBC.
Various CNN broadcasts	1980–present	Although CNN does keep extensive footage and news coverage, copies of programming with original presenter links (i.e. the newsreader) are rarely kept.
Vic and Sade	1949, 1957	One TV episode (from the 1957 run) exists, out of 10 produced. Much of the preceding radio program is also missing.
Young Talent Time	1971–1988	Almost all early episodes were erased by Network Ten.

== See also ==
- Lost film
- Lost literary work
- List of surviving DuMont Television Network broadcasts
- British television Apollo 11 coverage
- Missing Believed Wiped
- Film preservation
