= Grace Museum of America =

History museum in Arizona, US

Coordinates: 33.877°N 111.923°W

The Grace Museum of America is located in Cave Creek, Arizona in the mountains of the Sonoran Desert. The museum was started by Grace Voss Frederick and houses a collection of historical objects from significant times in American history. According to Frederick, the museum is intended to document America's "transition from a primitive country to a great nation". Many of the items were collected throughout Frederick's life and travels (she lived from 1905 to 2009).

The museum planning began in the early 1980s and the museum opened in the mid-1980s. The Grace Museum of America contains significant items from the last 200 years of American history.

The museum is funded by the Grace Foundation for Preservation of Americana; a non-profit organization which operated for charitable and educational purposes.

== The Museum Tour ==
The tour shows the transition of America across a timeline using displays that include original antiques and mannequins. The museum tour is approximately 2 hours long. The tour is guided and has live and recorded descriptions of the displays.
