= Hints for Swimmers =

1931 American television series

Hints for Swimmers is among the earliest regularly scheduled television series. Broadcast in 1931 on New York City station W2XAB (now WCBS-TV), it was a series featuring Charles Speer, which aired in a 15-minute time-slot. It was among the first television series to have aired on a CBS station.

== Scheduling ==
The episode telecast August 21, 1931 aired at 10:15PM, preceded by Connie Boswell (songs) and followed by Ruth Perrott (songs).

The episode telecast August 28, 1931 aired at 10:15PM, preceded by singer Julia Mahoney, and followed by Flora Triest (songs) and violinist Sandro Rosati.

The episode telecast September 4, 1931 aired at 10:15PM, preceded by Alexis Sandersen (songs) and followed by Natalie Towers.

The episode telecast September 11, 1931 aired at 10:15PM, preceded by singer Julia Mahoney and followed by singer Harriet Lee.

The episode telecast September 18, 1931 aired at 10:15PM, preceded by singer Helen Nugent and followed by singer Harriet Lee.

The episode telecast October 2, 1931 aired at 10:15PM, preceded by singer Helen Nugent and followed by singer Harriet Lee.

At least two other episodes also aired (they appear in TV listings, but the top of the newspaper with the date is cut-off)
