= Harry Fries and His Musical Saw =

Harry Fries and His Musical Saw is an early experimental television program aired in New York City during 1932. As the title suggests, it consisted of Harry Fries playing the musical saw. Time-slots ranged from 15 minutes to 25 minutes, and it aired on W2XAB (now WCBS-TV).

A technical problem with one of the telecasts was reported in the radio section of several newspapers on 22 April 1932. Fries was wearing a red neck-tie against a white shirt. The red tie was photographed as white on the early television equipment, resulting in a phone call from a viewer to ask why the performer wasn't dressed properly.

No footage remains of the series, as it aired live, and methods to record live television did not exist until 1947.
