= Television Today =

American television series

Television Today is an early television series, which aired in New York City in 1931 on experimental mechanical television station W2XAB. Also known as Looking at Television, the series featured Charles E. Butterfield, who gave a series of talks. According to the article "Vision Offers Boxing, Chess" in the August 22, 1931, edition of The New York Sun, Butterfield was the radio editor of the Associated Press.

== Scheduling ==
The episode telecast August 21, 1931, (listed as "Looking at Television") aired at 9:00 PM, preceded by a play titled Hawaiian Shadows and followed by a demonstration of television by Lighthouse for the Blind.

The episode telecast August 28, 1931, aired at 9:00 PM, preceded by the Irwin Trio and followed by How the Blind See.

The episode telecast September 4, 1931, aired at 9:00 PM, preceded by pantomimes by Grace Voss and followed by tenor Elliott Jaffe.

The episode telecast September 11, 1931, aired at 9:00 PM, preceded by a "vocal trio" and followed by magician Richard Kenny.
