= Television Magic =

Television Magic is an early American television series that aired in 1932.

Broadcast in New York City on experimental station W2XAB (now WCBS-TV), it was broadcast on a mechanical television system. The series was first announced in the September 17, 1932 edition of The New York Sun, with the article "Best Features on Television". The article stated that "Edwin Howard will bring vaudeville magic to television" and "card tricks and the difficult needle stunt will be given their initial trial over television".

== Scheduling ==
For some episodes, Television Magic aired at 8:00PM on Wednesday and was the first show on the day's schedule. It was followed by baseball scores for one minute and then a performance by dancer Grace Voss.
