= Piano Lessons (TV series) =

American television series

- Genre: Music education
- Presented by: Giuseppe Aldo Randegger
- Country of origin: United States
- Original language: English

Production
- Production locations: New York, New York
- Camera setup: Single-camera
- Running time: 30 minutes (originally); 15 minutes (later-on)

Original release
- Network: W2XAB
- Release: October 8, 1931 – 1932

Piano Lessons is an American music education television series featuring piano lessons from Giuseppe Aldo Randegger. It originally aired in New York City on W2XAB (now WCBS-TV), a then-experimental television station of Columbia Broadcasting System (CBS), from October 8, 1931, to 1932. Piano Lessons is among the earliest regularly scheduled television programs. Due to a lack of any preservation, the entire series is widely accepted as being completely lost.

== Production and broadcast ==
The series consisted of piano lessons given by Professor Giuseppe Aldo Randegger, and aired on mechanical television. The first episode aired October 8, 1931, as announced in the Radio News section of The Daily Star newspaper. Originally a 30-minute series, it later aired in a 15-minute time-slot. It aired without commercials, as American television was not yet a commercial service, due to the highly experimental nature of early television broadcasting.

In a television listing from 1932, the series is listed at 8:15PM on Mondays, preceded by The Television Ghost and followed by ukulele player Jack Peterson. In an earlier television listing from the same year, it is listed as airing at 9:00PM, preceded by songs by Doris Sharp and followed by songs by the Shannon Brothers.

== Randegger ==
Giuseppe Aldo Randegger also appeared in vaudeville and was also a composer. A picture of him appears on the University of Washington website in their digital collections. He was born circa 1874 and died in Manhattan on November 30, 1946, at the age of 72.

== Reception ==
The November 19, 1932, edition of The Sun featured a section called The Picture Gallery with letters from viewers. A letter writer named Allen Polner in Brooklyn said "television programs are improving, especially from W2XAB" and "last week I looked in and was more than pleased with the results", citing both Piano Lessons as well as segments with Gladys Kahn and Kane Whitney. The same viewer was not impressed with programs by stations W2XR and WIXAV, and felt television needed longer programming hours.
