= Grace Voss Frederick =

American curator (1905–2009)

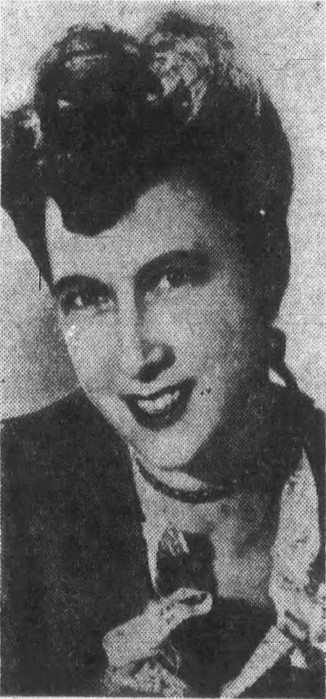
- Voss in 1945, in the Brooklyn Daily Eagle
- Born: Grace Caroline Voss; November 3, 1905; Yonkers, New York
- Died: January 16, 2009 (aged 103); Phoenix, Arizona
- Occupations: Actress, photographer, museum curator, philanthropist
- Years active: 1922–2009

Grace Voss Frederick (November 3, 1905 – January 16, 2009) was an American actress on the Broadway stage and on television when it was still an experimental medium. During the Great Depression, Voss shifted to photography to earn a living. She became a well-known portrait photographer and her work was featured in magazines like Life and Look. She transitioned from portraiture to television background and set designs in 1953 together with her husband Claude Frederick. Their work was shown on popular television shows of the period and featured in several movies. Because of the limits of technology, she invented a machine, known as the "Threeplex", which allowed still background photographs to simulate moving or time effects. The machine was donated to Brigham Young University after the couple's retirement.

The Fredericks moved to Arizona in the 1970s and she began collecting historical memorabilia and organizing it into historic productions. When her husband died, she founded the Grace Museum of America. The museum, located in Cave Creek, Arizona, contains art, antiques, and other items of historical interest mainly from the 19th and 20th centuries. To preserve the natural environment and her museum collection, in 2001 she donated 90 acres (360,000 m^{2}) of her land and US$6 million to the Arizona State University Foundation. The endowment was to ensure that the cultural center and nature reserve she had created would be conserved in its natural state and not broken up and sold for development. Frederick died at the age of 103 and in 2012 was featured as a biographical subject in the Arizona Literary Magazine.

== Early life and education ==
Grace Caroline Voss was born on November 3, 1905, in the Nepperhan neighborhood of Yonkers, New York, to Olga (née Rommel) and Ruben Tree Voss. Her father, who was a printer, was the grandson of John Tree, a brother of Ellen Tree and Anna Maria Tree, who were both well-known British performers in their day. Voss grew up in the boroughs of New York City, living in Brooklyn, Hollis, and Jamaica. She completed her primary education at Public School No. 3 in Manhattan, before graduating from Jamaica High School. After high school, Voss attended the Louis Senac School of Fencing and took acting courses at the School of the Theatre, graduating in 1925.

== Career ==
=== Acting (1925–1933) ===
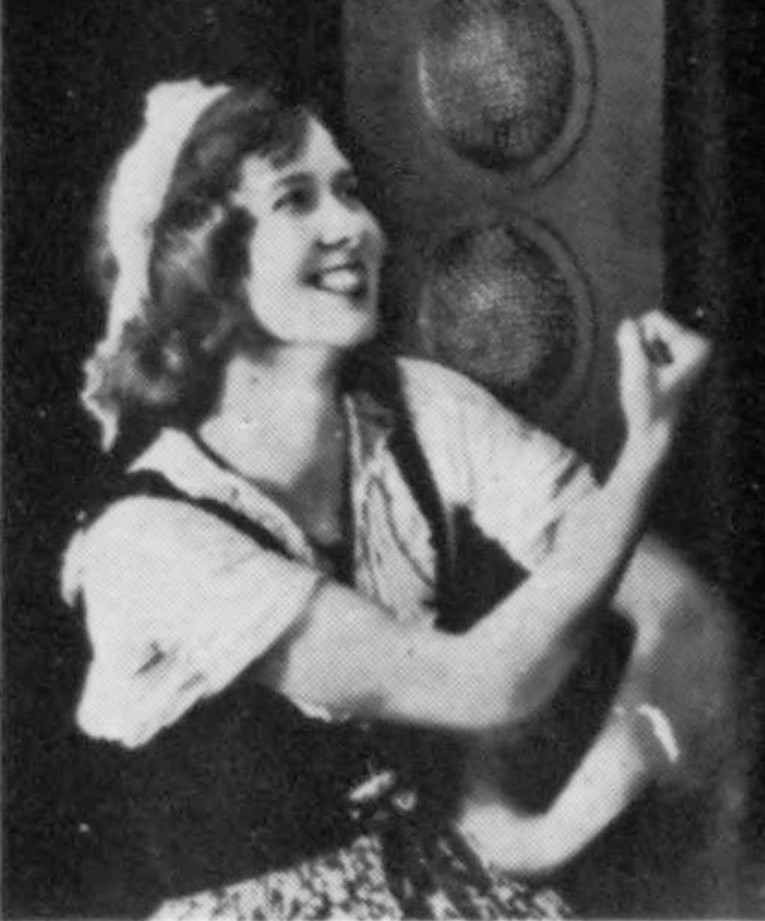
Voss on the inaugural broadcast of W2XAB television station, in 1931

Voss worked in vaudeville and on Broadway until 1931. She was a leading lady at the Children's Theater section of the Princess Theatre in Manhattan, which was operated by Clare Tree Major, starring in productions of well-known fairy queens and the 1926 run of "Cinderella". Among her other roles were Miss Neville in She Stoops to Conquer (1924) at the Princess Theater; Kitty Verdon in Charley's Aunt (1925), which was performed at Daly's Sixty-Third Street Theatre; and Ann Hood in Her First Affaire (1927), at the Bayes Theater. Ann Hood was the starring role in the play, and Voss received praise for her portrayal of a young flapper intent upon having adventures before she marries.

In addition to acting on the stage, Voss gave orations around New York state at various recitals, civic functions, and women's club meetings from the early 1920s through the first half of the 1930s. She began doing television work around 1931, presenting pantomimes as part of an experimental program to introduce visual broadcasting over television, hosted by W2XAB in Mount Vernon, New York. She appeared as the principal pantomimist in nineteen episodes of dramatic programming created for the Columbia Broadcasting System on W2XAB in 1931, and also in 1932 for the bicentennial of the birth of George Washington. In a 2002 interview, Voss recalled that as she could not earn enough money to support herself through television acting, she turned to photography.

=== Photography (1934–1963) ===
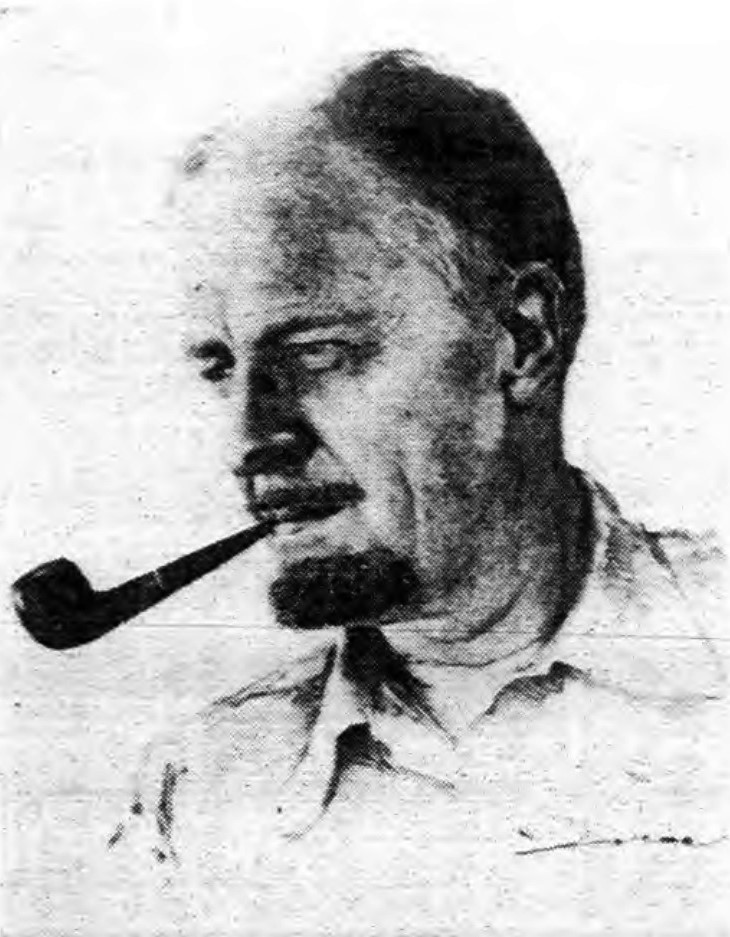
Claude Frederick in 1969

Around 1934, Voss contacted a friend who was working as a photographer and asked if she could work for a year as his apprentice. When she completed her training, she opened a small studio on West 57th Street in Manhattan. Focusing on portraiture, she was known for her artistic lighting and effects. Her work often appeared in or on the covers of leading magazines, such as Life and Look, among others. Within a decade her business had grown sufficiently for her to move to another floor of the building, remodel new offices, and employ five women as assistants. Within two years, she expanded the business to include beauty services, like hair and make-up, so that her clients could be sure that their best features would be brought forward and their unflattering traits would be minimized. Voss allowed other photographers to use her darkroom, and that is how she met her future husband, Claude Frederick. The couple married in 1950 in Manhattan, and she began using the name Grace Voss Frederick.

After marriage, Frederick contemplated being a housewife, but after going to television school, she and her husband worked together as set designers from 1953. Among their backgrounds was the opening scene for the Kate Smith Show, based upon Smith's theme song "When The Moon Comes Over The Mountain". They formed Jenfred, Inc., a firm based in New York City that specialized in creating background images for live television productions. Initially, she produced film backgrounds to depict scene locations and establish the context for the production. Background scenes by Jenfred were used in television shows such as The Eddie Fisher Show, Your Hit Parade, Jack Paar's Tonight, and What's My Line?. Jenfred was also credited in films including Sunrise at Campobello (1960) and the "Academy Award-winning film, Twelve Angry Men", according to journalist Geoff Davidian of The Arizona Republic.

The slides for television projection were too static to properly simulate changes in lighting and other effects, like changes from a sunset to a moonscape. In 1955, Frederick invented a machine with her husband and a machinist, which animated still slides. They filed for a patent on an "Apparatus for Projecting Multiple Superposed Images". The machine, which they called the "Threeplex", used three lenses to manipulate images and create composites so that they could effect change or rotation making more realistic imagery. They operated their business until 1963, deciding it was time to retire when television production moved to Hollywood.

== Later life ==
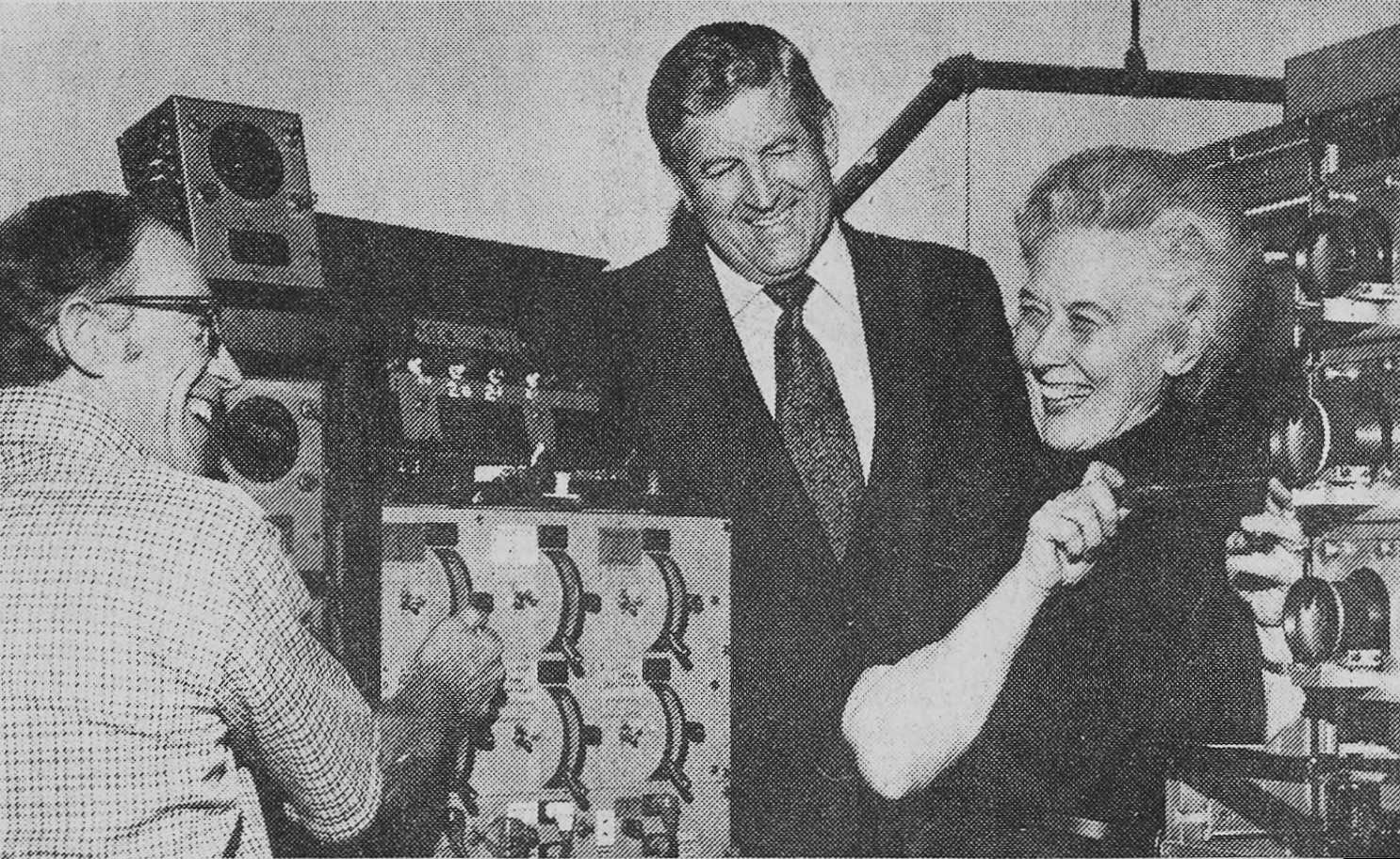
Frederick (right) donating the Threeplex machine to Brigham Young University in 1976

In their retirement, Frederick and her husband traveled the world for several years before making their home in Arizona in 1970. They eventually settled in Cave Creek, Arizona, when the Sierra Vista Dude Ranch was broken up into individual parcels in 1971. She spent her time visiting antique shops and buying historic items which interested her. She organized the items into period productions, which were held in her basement, and which gave detailed insight into each decade of history. Frederick also served as president of the Cave Creek Community Association, an organization formed for area business development. In 1980, the couple converted their garage into a small museum focused on home entertainment, including radios, televisions, magic lanterns, phonographs, and even a player piano. Claude died in 1981 and Frederick continued her historic productions for the local community.

Frederick began to curate the items she bought, dreaming of creating a museum of Americana. Around 1994, she began constructing an 18,000-square-foot museum on the old airstrip on her property. Showcasing 200 years of American history, she called her project the Grace Foundation for the Preservation of Americana, but it is commonly known as Grace Museum of America. The primary focus is on innovation and technology in the 19th and 20th centuries, but she also focused on culture, including history of fashion and music. In designing the building to house her collections, Frederick was careful to blend it into the desert habitat. The main museum was completed in 1999 and it was soon afterward opened to the public.

Frederick's home, in which she lived for almost 35 years, was high in the Sonoran Desert. Although her home was near the museum, the location had a variety of nature and wildlife. She wanted to preserve the undeveloped area where deer, peccary (also known as javelina), and mountain lions lived. She also developed a theater for community plays to be performed, which was adjacent to the museum with plans to expand it to be able to accommodate 100 people and feature a rooftop observatory for astronomical observation. In 1993, she was notified that she would be a recipient of the YWCA Tribute to Women honorees the following year for her philanthropy. In 2001, Frederick donated 90 acres (360,000 m^{2}) of her land and $6 million to the Arizona State University Foundation to maintain the cultural center and nature reserve and ensure that the area would be conserved in its natural state and not broken up and sold for development. In 2008, the National Society of the Daughters of the American Revolution awarded Frederick their Medal of Honor in recognition of her preservation efforts during the national convention in May of that year.

== Death and legacy ==
Frederick died in Phoenix, Arizona, on January 16, 2009, at the age of 103. At the time of her death, she was remembered for her work on stage and in early television, as well as her philanthropy and museum. In 1976, Frederick donated the patented machine for producing moving images to Brigham Young University's Movie Studio. In 2011, Emily Pritchard Cary submitted a biography of Frederick to the Arizona Author's Association Literary Contest. The biography was a finalist and was featured in the Arizona Literary Magazine in 2012.
