= Alice Remsen =

Alice Remsen is the assumed title of one of the earliest scheduled television segments, pre-dating The Television Ghost. She appeared on the station W2XCD during 1931. On her segment she performed songs.

Nothing remains of the series today, as it aired live, and practical methods to record live television did not exist until late 1947 (though there is a poor-quality experimental recording of BBC TV of the 1930s which suggests mechanical television could be entertaining. Additionally, from the early electronic television era some German programming of the 1930s survives as it was shot on film instead of being live).

== Talent ==
Remsen has been described as one of the first persons who could be referred to as a "television star". In a letter to Time magazine from an employee of the station, it was revealed that the reason the station invited Remsen back to sing on television week after week was that the studio engineers "tinkered with the equipment constantly and wanted to televise the same subject at frequent intervals in order better to judge the results of their work", in particular using the "slight space between Miss Remsen's upper front teeth" to gauge the accuracy of the cameras.

A 1956 New York Daily News article said of Remsen that she "used to be merely a songwriter and a music publisher", but had recently "launched her own diskery and she's calling it Remsen Records", beginning with a collection of songs written by Remsen and performed by Betty Madigan.

== Scheduling ==
An early episode aired at 9:00PM, followed by a Felix the Cat cartoon.

A later episode aired at 9:00PM, followed by a film called The Early Bird.
