= Hair Fashions =

Hair Fashions is an early mechanical television series, which aired in New York City during 1932. Featuring Ferdinand Graf, it was a 15-minute program about hair fashions which aired on W2XAB (now WCBS-TV). It was also listed as Society Hair Fashions in an early television listing. It was likely one of the world's earliest fashion television series. In one listing, it was listed for Wednesday at 8:30PM, preceded by dancer Grace Voss and followed at 8:45PM by Senator Nutt and his Guffawians. (see section "Television programs for the week").

Nothing remains of the series today, as it aired live, and the practical methods of recording live television did not exist until late 1947. The bottom of Page 19 of the July 2, 1932 edition of The New York Sun features a behinds-the-scenes picture of an episode.
