= Grace Yeager =

Grace Yeager is the assumed title of a 1931–1932 United States television series which aired on New York City television station W2XAB. Among the earliest regularly scheduled series, it featured the singer of the same name, who was a soprano. According to an article in the October 31, 1931, edition of The New York Sun titled W2XAB Source of Features, Yeager had previously been a member of the San Carlos Opera Company. None of the episodes still exist, as it aired live, and practical methods to record live television did not exist until 1947.

== Scheduling ==
The series typically aired on Tuesdays, at the end of the programming day. For example, one episode was scheduled at 10:45 pm on September 29, 1931, and was preceded by Boyd Wagner, while another episode was scheduled for January 26, 1932 at 10:45PM and was preceded by Bert McElfresh.
