= Elliot Jaffee =

1930s American television series

Elliot Jaffee is an American television series, which aired 1931 to 1932 on experimental television station W2XAB (now WCBS-TV). Featuring the tenor of the same name, it was a live music series on mechanical television. Jaffee was also a radio performer during the early 1930s. None of the episodes still exist, as methods to record live television were not developed until late 1947. The series aired in a 15-minute time-slot.

== Scheduling ==
Aired on Saturdays, it typically aired at 8:00PM, and was followed by a segment with Lilyan Crossman.
