= Exhibition Boxing Bouts =

American television series

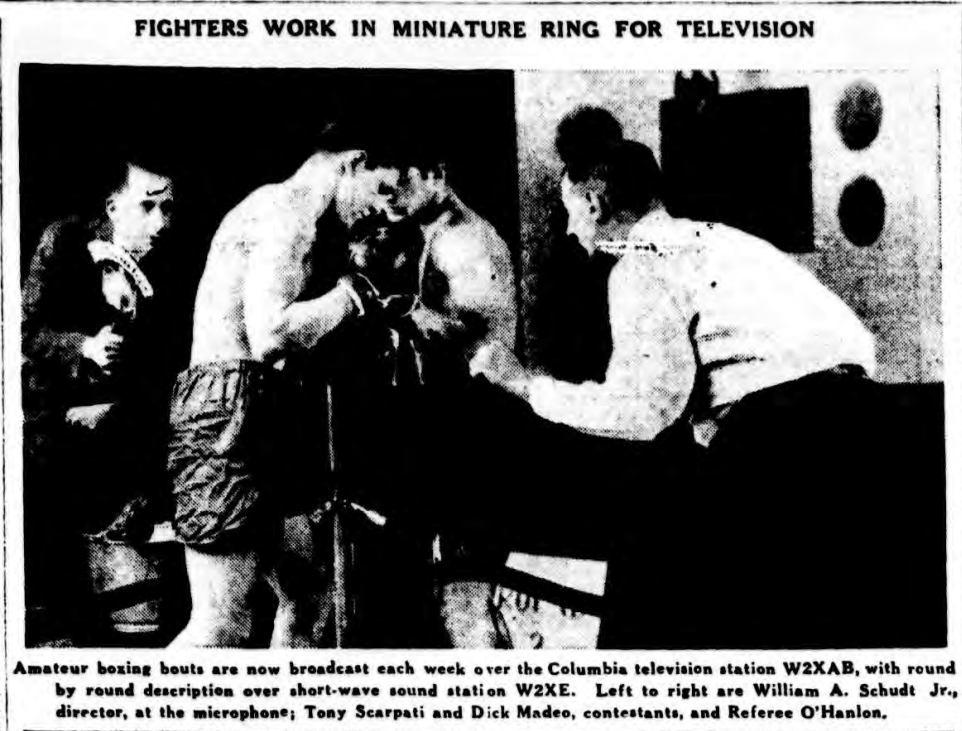
Publicity photo. Tony Scarpati (left) and Dick Madeo are the contestants.

Exhibition Boxing Bouts is the possible title for a very early American television series. Aired 1931 to 1932 in New York City, it consisted of miniature boxing matches, and aired on what was then mechanical television station W2XAB, which later became WCBS-TV. Time-slots varied from 15 minutes to 30 minutes, and it aired without commercials, as United States television was still an experimental service. According to the section "Radio Dial Log" in the August 20, 1931 edition of The New York Sun, one of the episodes featured a description by Harry von Zell and Bill Schudt Jr., with Jimmie deForrest as the referee. None of the episodes still exist, as it aired live, and practical methods to record live television did not exist until late 1947. A still photograph of the series appears in page 19 of the February 20, 1932 edition of The New York Sun, depicting two boxers in a small ring.
