= The Television Ghost =

American 1931 horror television program

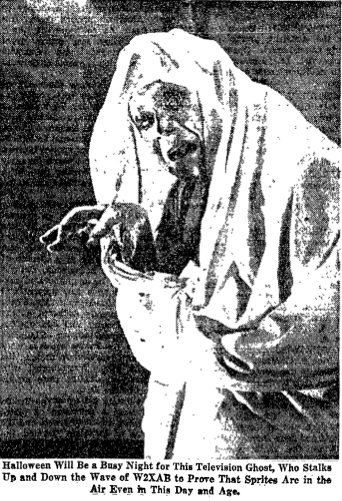
- A newspaper promotion for the series
- Genre: Dramatic; Horror; Anthology
- Presented by: George Kelting
- Narrated by: Bill Schudt
- Country of origin: United States
- Original language: English

Production
- Production locations: New York, New York
- Camera setup: Single-camera
- Running time: 15 minutes

Original release
- Network: W2XAB
- Release: August 17, 1931 – February 15, 1933

The Television Ghost is a lost American dramatic horror anthology television series featuring ghost stories presented by George Kelting as the ghost of various murder victims. It originally aired in New York City on W2XAB (now WCBS-TV), an experimental television station of Columbia Broadcasting System (CBS), from August 17, 1931, to February 15, 1933. It is believed to be one of the first dramatic television series in the world. Due to a lack of any preservation, the entire series is widely accepted as being completely lost.

== Premise ==
The ghosts of murder victims would tell the story of their respective murders. George Kelting was the storyteller and acted as the ghost, wearing white makeup and having a white sheet draped over his head.

== Cast and crew ==
- George Kelting as the ghost-storyteller
- Bill Schudt as announcer
- Harry Spears as engineer

== Broadcast ==
The series was also broadcast on radio by W2XE, New York City, and AM 970 WABC (forerunner to modern AM 880 WCBS, not related to the current WABC or AM 970). The Television Ghost ran for the entirety of W2XAB's two-year run as a mechanical television station. Each episode featured a run time of 15 minutes.

No audio recordings of the program were ever made, nor were any portions of the program filmed; the only known remaining documents are a few publicity photos of Kelting in costume and some newspaper mentions, making it a lost television broadcast.

A Halloween episode was previewed in the Brooklyn Standard Union on October 30, 1931: "Halloween will be duly celebrated by Columbia's television station W2XAB tomorrow when the Television Ghost, unidentified mystery character, takes things in his own hands to thrill and chill lookers-in and listeners-in. The Television Ghost, who stalks the radio waves regularly on Tuesday nights, will be given free rein of the visual studios and will demonstrate, among other things, how one ghost can become three ghosts without a magician in the picture."

For part of its run it was followed on the schedule by Piano Lessons.
