= Helen Haynes =

American television series

Helen Haynes is the assumed title of an early American television series. It aired in 1931 and again in 1932 on experimental New York City station W2XAB, and was a 15-minute music program viewed on mechanical television sets. There is scarce information about the series and its star, Helen Haynes, but the series is significant as one of the earliest regularly scheduled television series. In the section "Dramas, Plays and Soloists on Television" in the October 8, 1932, edition of the New York Sun, the 1932 episodes were described as a "miniature musical comedy song revue," a genre that would later come to be known as the variety show.

In the October 29, 1932, edition of the New York Sun, section "Television Programs for the Week", there is a picture of Haynes. In the section "Week's Vision Offerings" of the November 21, 1931, edition of the same newspaper, it is mentioned that Haynes was a former "Follies girl", and a soprano. It is mentioned that her next episode (which aired the following day) would feature songs from East Wind, which she had appeared in. East Wind was a broadway musical with music by Sigmund Romberg and lyrics by Oscar Hammerstein II which ran for 23 performances during 1931. This may have been the first time songs by Oscar Hammerstein II were performed on television.

None of the episodes still exist, as methods to record live television were not practical until late 1947.

== See also ==
- Harriet Lee – W2XAB music series from 1931
