= Harriet Lee (singer) =

American radio singer

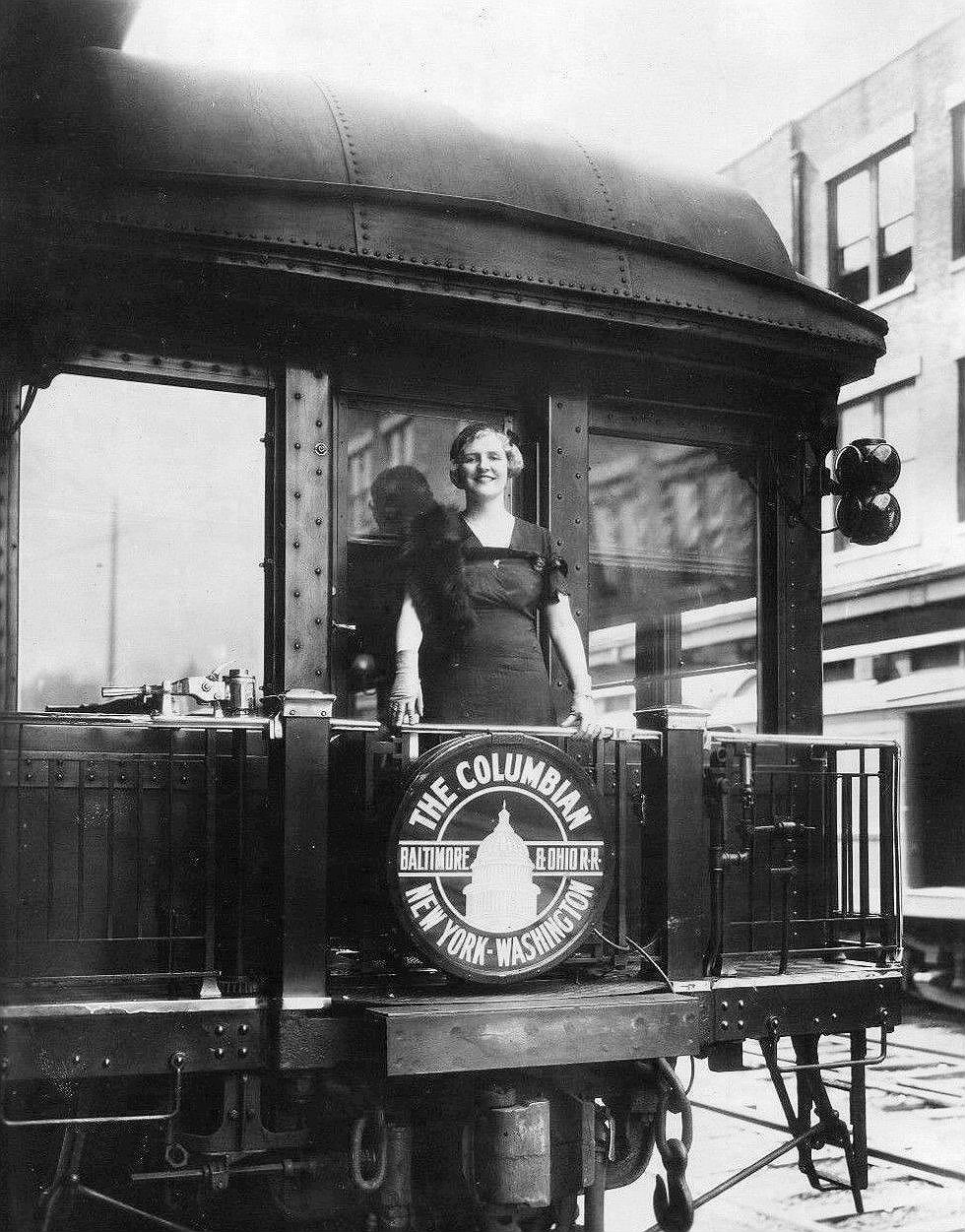
Harriet Lee pictured on the B&O Railroad's Columbian in 1931

Harriet Lee was an American radio singer during the Golden Age of Radio in the 1920s–1930s. She was best known as a blues contralto on the Columbia Broadcasting System (CBS) and, later, NBC Radio Networks. Called the "Songbird of the Air", she was named Miss Radio 1931 based on nationwide submittals from radio stations, judged by Flo Ziegfeld and McClelland Barclay, to select the "most beautiful radio artist" for the Radio World's Fair in New York City. Lee was one of the highest paid radio stars that year. She hosted the Harriet Lee show on experimental New York City station W2XAB (now WCBS-TV) in 1931, making her one of the first singers to have a show on U.S. television.

After her radio appearances ended in the mid-1930s, Lee was a voice coach working with various film stars for major Hollywood studios. Between the 1930s–1960s, she gave singing lessons to Dorothy Lamour, Ava Gardner, Esther Williams, Rhonda Fleming, Ginger Rogers, and Janet Leigh, among others.

== Early life ==
Lee was a great-great niece of Sam Houston and grew up in Chicago, Illinois, where she was somewhat of a tomboy as a girl. Her father had an automobile dealership in Chicago, where she answered phones as a teen. Lee later studied piano and voice at the Chicago College of Music in the evening, while working during the day at a music store.

== Radio singer ==
Lee began singing off-stage with Ted Fiorito's band at the Edgewater Beach Hotel. Called "Bobby Lee" as a publicity stunt because of her low contralto voice, many in the audience assumed the unseen singer they were hearing was a man. Lee performed on Chicago radio for more than four years in the mid-1920s, getting her start in radio in 1925 on the old WOK, then as one of the singers on WLS-AM and other Windy City stations, including KYW (when it was licensed to Chicago in the 1920s) and the old WIBO. While with WLS, Lee sang as part of the "Harmony Team" and also played "Aunt May" on the Children's Hour show.

In April 1929, Lee was introduced by Wendell Hall as the "Chicago Nightingale" on The Majestic Theater of the Air show on the CBS radio network. She then left Chicago for New York to sing on CBS full-time. On January 4, 1930, she performed on a coast-to-coast radio production from both New York and Los Angeles, singing from New York on the Paramount Playhouse show originating on KNX-AM in Los Angeles and picked up by KHJ-AM, the CBS affiliate in Los Angeles. Later that year, she was featured on the cover of the May–October 1930 issue of Radio Digest magazine, dubbed "The Songbird of the Air". By 1931, Lee was one of the highest paid and best known singers on network radio. In July 1931, she sang on the Cunard Weekend Program, sponsored by the Cunard Line on CBS. In Variety's review of the program, the entertainment trade magazine called Lee a "heavy voiced crooner", whose performance "gave a pleasing rendition of a new ballad".

In September, 1931, impresario Flo Ziegfeld and artist McClelland Barclay judged a nationwide survey of radio stations to crown the "most beautiful radio artist" as Miss Radio 1931 for the Radio World's Fair. Lee was their unanimous choice from among 600 candidates. Graham McNamee described her as a "blonde statuesque beauty" wowing the 28,000 Fair attendees at New York's Madison Square Garden, where great interest was shown in the nascent television technology. In early 1932, Lee left CBS for the NBC Blue Network, debuting April 7 on flagship station WJZ in New York. After two years, Lee moved to Hartford, Connecticut, to perform on WTIC-AM, where her program was carried on the NBC Red Network, beginning in October 1934. By 1936, her popularity had diminished when she appeared on WOR's radio show, Return Engagement, which featured radio stars of yesteryear. In his syndicated newspaper gossip column of May 3, 1938, Jimmy Fidler said Lee had "slipped into oblivion" as far as the radio listening public was concerned, but noted she had found a new, behind-the-scenes role as voice teacher for actress Dorothy Lamour. The introduction of Hollywood's Hays Code in 1934 contributed to Lee's decline of employment because her low-pitched voice did not conform to code standards, which were based on females singing in higher octaves.

== Early television ==
Using mechanical television technology, the Columbia Broadcasting System's W2XAB (now WCBS-TV) in New York City began regular broadcasting on July 21, 1931. One of the new station's first programs, Harriet Lee, featured Lee as Columbia's popular radio singer. The Harriet Lee television show aired in a 15-minute evening time-slot on Wednesdays and Fridays, produced live at W2XAB's Manhattan studios. It was among the earliest entertainment programs to have aired on U.S. television on something resembling a regular basis, with at least 12 episodes being scheduled. W2XAB broadcast an early Harriett Lee episode on Wednesday, July 29, 1931, at 8:30 p.m., preceded by Tony's Scrap Book and followed by an interview. A later episode aired Wednesday September 30, 1931, at 8:00 p.m. and was the first show on the day's schedule of limited broadcasting. At the time, there were an estimated nine thousand television sets in the New York area. Because W2XAB was broadcasting in the shortwave band, the station's signal could be received beyond the New York metropolitan area, as far away as Boston and Baltimore. In Allentown, Pennsylvania, some 80 miles (130 km) distant, W2XAB's daily program schedules were listed by the local newspaper, as did the Ithaca Journal in upstate New York, 175 miles (282 km) northwest. None of the episodes are known to exist, as methods to record live television were not practical until the 1940s when kinescope recording began.

== Films and recordings ==
Between 1926 and 1933, Lee made several recordings on the RCA Victor, Columbia, and Brunswick Records labels. Some of her recordings were solos and others were with accompanists such as organist Jesse Crawford and ensembles, such as Anson Weeks and his Orchestra.

Lee appeared in some Vitaphone short films during the 1930s, such as Rambling 'Round Radio Row in 1934. She did the voice of Betty Boop in the 1931 animated film, The Bum Bandit and was the uncredited voice double for Jean Harlow in the 1933 film, Hold Your Man. In the 1940s, she sang in the film Ziegfeld Follies and was the voice double for actress Audrey Totter in Dangerous Partners. Her final film work was in 1951, which she was the voice double for Barbara Stanwyck in The Man with a Cloak.

== Voice teacher ==
In September 1936, Lee left New York for Hollywood, having received a lucrative contract as a voice teacher. She worked at Paramount Pictures and MGM in the 1930s–1940s with such Hollywood stars as Dorothy Lamour, Ava Gardner, and Rhonda Fleming. She also did music arrangements for such entertainers as French singer Jean Sablon in 1938. In 1940, students from Lee's Los Angeles voice studio performed on Stage One, a Sunday afternoon radio program on KMPC. In 1946, Lee coached Esther Williams for her first singing part in the film, Easy to Wed.

On August 29, 1951, Lee returned to television in Los Angeles, making a guest singing appearance with Craig Stevens on KTTV's Open House show. The 1950s saw Lee continuing her career as a vocal coach for aspiring Hollywood stars. While living in Malibu Beach, she signed in 1952 with Universal International Pictures as a singing teacher. In 1953, actor Tony Curtis studied voice with Lee and in 1957, Kim Novak did her own singing in the films, Pal Joey and Jeanne Eagels, after studying with Lee. By 1960, syndicated columnist Hedda Hopper was writing of Lee, "She's taught more [stars] how to sing than you could shake a stick at", mentioning Ginger Rogers and Janet Leigh. Lee continued to operate her Los Angeles voice studio for would-be singers in the 1960s.

In the 1960s–1970s, Lee worked with a number of performers on the Broadway stage. Among them were Ann Miller in Mame and Hello, Dolly!, Anne Baxter in Applause, and Gene Nelson in Follies. She also coached other singers who would play the role of Dolly in Hello, Dolly!, including Ginger Rogers, Eve Arden, and Pamela Britton. In 1973, Lee coached Eva Gabor for her role in a touring version of another hit Broadway musical, Applause. In discussing the art of voice coaching with newspaper columnist Norton Mockridge in 1972, Lee said: "I can teach the technique of singing and I can teach a serious student how to use her speaking voice in song. But no one in the world can put a voice in someone's throat if it isn't there to begin with".

== Personal life ==
While living in New York in the early 1930s, Lee said she enjoyed cooking, playing bridge, and driving fast cars. After she moved to Hollywood and began working with Dorothy Lamour as her voice coach, they became close friends. Syndicated gossip columnist Jimmy Fidler described Lee as Lamour's "inseparable advisor and friend". In December, 1939, Lee wed Bill Boggess, with Lamour serving as her bridesmaid.

== See also ==
- Helen Haynes – a 1931–1932 music series on W2XAB
- 1931 in television
