= 1934 in American television =

This is a list of American television-related events in 1934.

== Events ==
- June 19 -
  - President Franklin D. Roosevelt signs the Communications Act of 1934. Particular parts of it became effective on July 1, 1934; the remaining parts on July 11, 1934. Communications technology was determined to be an interstate good. Roosevelt, along with lobbyists and state regulators, wanted communications technology, both wired and wireless, to be monitored and had influenced the United States Congress to pass the Communications Act of 1934. The goal was to have telephone and broadcasting regulated with the same jurisdiction in a way similar to that in which the Interstate Commerce Commission (ICC) regulated the railways and interstate commerce. The act did not, however, allow for price regulation through the FCC, due to strong lobbying efforts from the National Association of Regulatory Utility Commissioners (NARUC).
  - The Federal Communications Commission (FCC) was formed by the Communications Act of 1934 to replace the radio regulation functions of the previous Federal Radio Commission.
- July 17 - The initial organization of the Federal Communications Commission (FCC) was effected on July 17, 1934, in three divisions, Broadcasting, Telegraph, and Telephone. Each division was led by two of the seven commissioners, with the FCC chairman being a member of each division. The organizing meeting directed the divisions to meet on July 18, July 19, and July 20, respectively.
- August 25 - On August 25, the inventor Philo Farnsworth gave the world's first public demonstration of an all-electronic television system, using a live camera, at the Franklin Institute of Philadelphia. His demonstrations continued for ten days afterwards. Farnsworth's system included his version of an image dissector.
- October 29 - On October 29, 1934, Mutual Broadcasting System, Inc. was incorporated, with Bamberger's and WGN Inc. each holding 50 percent of the stock—five each of the ten total shares.
- Specific date unknown -
  - RCA files a patent interference suit against Philo Farnsworth, due to their simultaneous work on an image dissector. Farnsworth won the suit in February 1935; RCA appealed the decision in 1936 and lost.
  - The American inventor Vladimir K. Zworykin completed his experiments with the iconoscope, the first practical video camera tube to be used in early television cameras. The image iconoscope, first presented in 1934, was a result of a collaboration between Zworykin and RCA's German licensee Telefunken. In 1935 the Reichspost started the public broadcastings of an electronic television system by using this tube. It applied a 180 lines system.
  - By 1934 RCA increased the definition of its television broadcasts to 343 interlaced lines and the frame rate to 30 per second.

== Sources ==
- Burns, R. W. (1998). Television: An International History of the Formative Years. IEE History of Technology Series. Vol. 22. London: Institution of Electrical Engineers. ISBN 0-85296-914-7.
- Cox, Jim (2015) [2002]. Say Goodnight, Gracie: The Last Years of Network Radio. Jefferson, N.C.: McFarland. ISBN 978-0-7864-1168-9.
- Robinson, Thomas Porter (1979) [1943]. Radio Networks and the Federal Government. New York: Arno Press. ISBN 0-405-11772-8.
- Rose, Cornelia B. Jr. (1971). National Policy for Radio Broadcasting. New York: Arno Press/New York Times. ISBN 0-405-03580-2.
- Schatzkin, Paul (2002). The Boy Who Invented Television: A Story of Inspiration, Persistence, and Quiet Passion. TeamCom Books. ISBN 1-928791-30-1.
