= 1933 in American television =

This is a list of American television-related events in 1933.

== Events ==
- February 15 - Final episode for the horror anthology television series The Television Ghost. The series primarily focused on ghost stories.
- April - In April 1933, the American inventor Philo Farnsworth submitted a patent application entitled Image Dissector, but which actually detailed a CRT-type camera tube. This is among the first patents to propose the use of a "low-velocity" scanning beam and RCA had to buy it in order to sell image orthicon tubes to the general public. However, Farnsworth never transmitted a clear and well focused image with such a tube.
- June- A research group at the Westinghouse Electronic Company headed by the American inventor Vladimir K. Zworykin presented the iconoscope to the general public in a press conference in June 1933, and two detailed technical papers were published in September and October of the same year. Unlike Philo Farnsworth's image dissector, the Zworykin iconoscope was much more sensitive, useful with an illumination on the target between 4ft-c (43lx) and 20ft-c (215lx). It was also easier to manufacture and produced a very clear image. The iconoscope was the primary camera tube used in American television broadcasting from 1936 until 1946, when it was replaced by the image orthicon tube.
- October - In his continued attempts to improve his image dissector, the inventor Philo Farnsworth introduced a multipactor in October 1933. Farnsworth's image dissector was the first practical version of a fully electronic imaging device for television. It had very poor light sensitivity, and was therefore primarily useful only where illumination was exceptionally high (typically over 685 cd/m^{2}).
