= 1931 in American television =

This is a list of American television-related events in 1931.

== Events ==
- April 26 - On April 26, the General Broadcasting System's WGBS radio and W2XCR television transmitted their regular broadcasting debut in New York City with a special demonstration performed in the Aeolian Hall at Fifth Avenue and Fifty-fourth Street. Thousands waited to catch a glimpse of the Broadway theatre stars who appeared on the 6 in (150 mm) square image, in an evening event to publicize a weekday programming schedule offering movies and live entertainers during the four-hour daily broadcasts. Among those appearing were the boxer Primo Carnera, the actors Gertrude Lawrence, Louis Calhern, Frances Upton and Lionel Atwill, the WHN announcer Nils Granlund, and the Forman Sisters.
- May 1 – The first wedding is broadcast by television, on New York City's W2XCR.
- June 3 – First television outside broadcast of a sporting event: Baird televises the Epsom Derby horse race in England.
- July 21 – CBS's station W2XAB begins broadcasting 28 hours a week in New York City.
- August – At the Berlin Radio Show, Manfred von Ardenne gives the world's first public demonstration of a television system using a cathode-ray tube for both transmission and reception. Ardenne never develops a camera tube, using the CRT instead as a flying-spot scanner to scan slides and film.
- October 9 – Canada's first television station, VE9EC, begins broadcasting in Montreal, Quebec. VE9EC is owned jointly by radio station CKAC and the newspaper company La Presse.

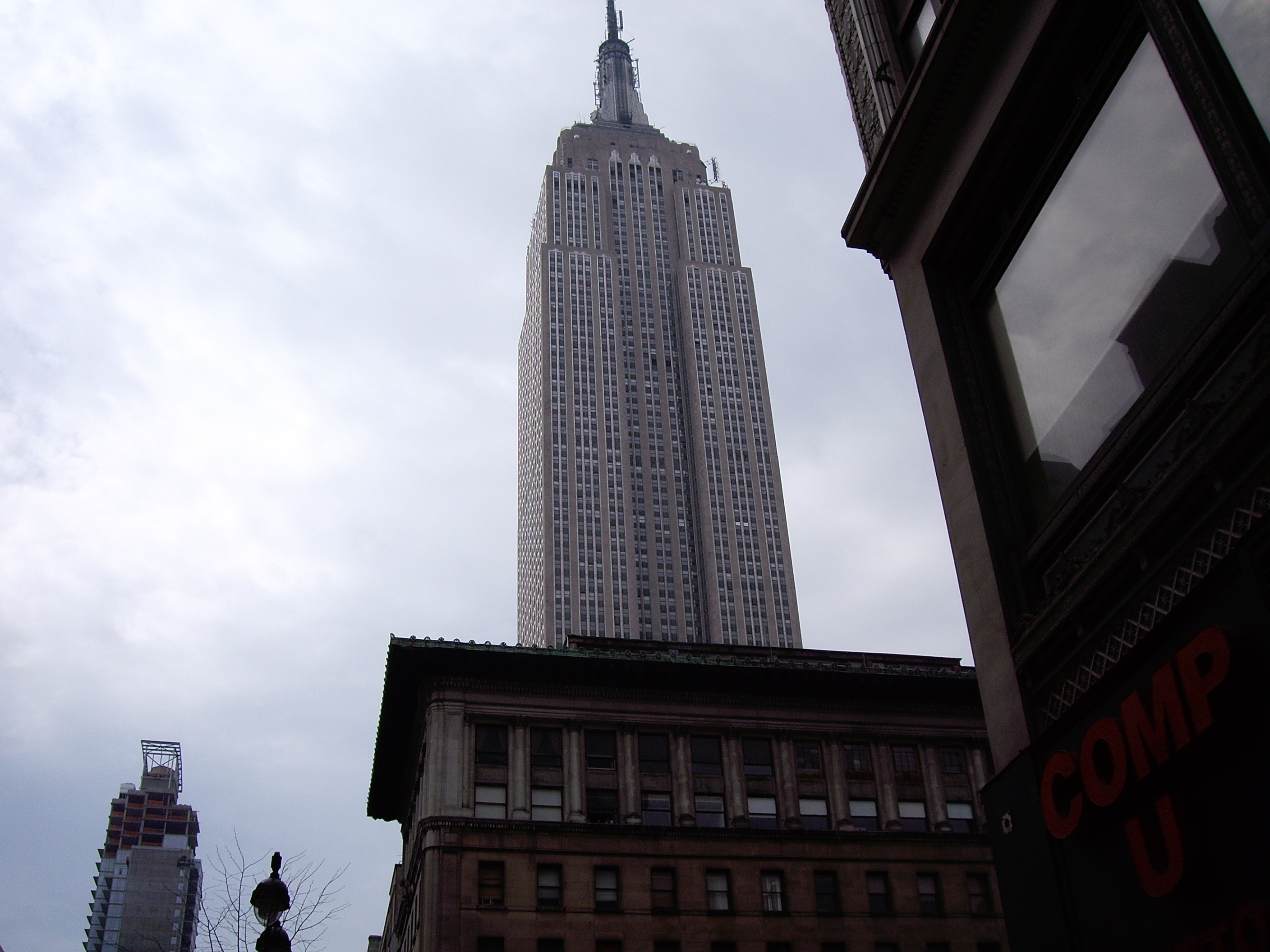
October 30: NBC on Empire State Building which had opened during May.

- October 30 – NBC installs a television transmitter on top of the Empire State Building.
- November- As head of television development at RCA, Vladimir Zworykin submitted a patent application for the iconoscope in November 1931. The patent was issued in 1935.
- November 1 – Television images are transmitted from JOAK radio station in Tokyo, Japan by Professors Kenjiro Takayagani and Tomomasa Nakashima. The still images comprise 80 lines at 20 frames per second.
- December 22 – NBC begins broadcasting experimental test transmissions from the Empire State Building transmitter.
- December 23 – Don Lee Broadcasting begins broadcasting low-definition electromechanical television from the station W6XAO (later KTSL) in Los Angeles, broadcasting one hour of film footage, six days per week.
- Specific date unknown -
  - In 1931, RCA's design for the iconoscope incorporated Kálmán Tihanyi's proposal about a camera tube that accumulated and stored electrical charges ("photoelectrons") within the tube throughout each scanning cycle. Tihanyi would not receive a U.S. patent for his transmitting tube until May 1939.
  - The first practical iconoscope was constructed in 1931 by Sanford Essig, when he accidentally left one silvered mica sheet in the oven too long. Upon examination with a microscope, Essig noticed that the silver layer had broken up into a myriad of tiny, isolated silver globules. He also noticed that: the tiny dimension of the silver droplets would enhance the image resolution of the iconoscope by a quantum leap.
  - Philo Farnsworth overcame his power problems with his image dissector through the invention of a unique multipactor device. He began work on the device in 1930, and first demonstrated it in 1931. This small tube could amplify a signal reportedly to the 60th power or better. and showed great promise in all fields of electronics. A problem with the multipactor, unfortunately, was that it wore out at an unsatisfactory rate.
  - In March 1929, the radio giant RCA had begun daily experimental television broadcasts in New York City over station W2XBS, the predecessor of current television station WNBC. The 60-line transmissions consisted of pictures, signs, and views of persons and objects. The experimental broadcasts continued until 1931.
  - In 1931, David Sarnoff of RCA offered to buy Philo Farnsworth's patents for $100,000, with the stipulation that Farnsworth would become an employee of RCA. Farnsworth refused. In June of that year, Farnsworth joined the Philco company and moved to Philadelphia along with his wife and two children.
  - NBC started to use the NBC chimes sequence in 1931. It eventually became the first audio trademark to be accepted by the U.S. Patent and Trademark Office.

== Sources ==
- Abramson, Albert (1987). The History of Television, 1880 to 1941. Jefferson, NC: McFarland & Co. ISBN 0-89950-284-9.
- Everson, George (1949). The Story of Television, The Life of Philo T. Farnsworth. New York: W. W. Norton & Co. ISBN 978-0-405-06042-7.
- Farnsworth, Elma G. (1990). Distant Vision: Romance and Discovery of an Invisible Frontier. Salt Lake City: PemberlyKent Publishers, Inc. p. #?. ISBN 978-0-9623276-0-5.
