= 1941 in American television =

This is a list of American television-related events in 1941.

== Events ==
- January - The NBC-owned radio network Blue Network has completed a phase of expansion. While it had 33 stations in 1937, this total had nearly tripled by January 1941, when the network had 92 stations coast to coast.
- May - The Federal Communications Commission (FCC) issued formal rules to break up what it perceived to be monopolies in radio. One of these rules specifically barred a network from operating more than one hookup. The rule aimed directly against NBC's ownership of two radio networks.
- July 1-
  - The Federal Communications Commission (FCC) allowed full-fledged commercial television broadcasts to begin on July 1, 1941. NBC station W2XBS in New York City received the first commercial license, adopting the call letters WNBT. The first official, paid television advertisement broadcast by any U.S. station was for watch manufacturer Bulova, which aired that day, just before the start of a Brooklyn Dodgers baseball telecast on WNBT. The ad consisted of test pattern, featuring the newly assigned WNBT call letters, which was modified to resemble a clock – complete with functioning hands – with the Bulova logo (featuring the phrase "Bulova Watch Time") in the lower right-hand quadrant of the test pattern (a photograph of the NBC camera setting up the test pattern-advertisement for that ad can be seen at this page). Among the programs that aired during the first week of WNBT's new, commercial schedule was The Sunoco News, a simulcast of the Sun Oil-sponsored NBC Radio program anchored by Lowell Thomas; amateur boxing at Jamaica Arena; the Eastern Clay Courts tennis championships; programming from the USO; the spelling bee-type game show Words on the Wing; a few feature films; and a one-time-only, test broadcast of the game show Truth or Consequences, sponsored by Lever Brothers.
  - For a one-time experiment, the radio game show Truth or Consequences is televised on the first day of New York station WNBT's commercial program schedule. It was the first game show to air on broadcast television. However, the series did not appear on television again until 1950, when the medium had caught on commercially.
- July 2 - Debut of the televised game show CBS Television Quiz on the CBS television station in New York City, WCBW Channel 2 (the forerunner of WCBS-TV). It was the first game show to be broadcast regularly on television. It was an in-house production and broadcast in black and white. The host was Gil Fates, with Frances Buss as scorekeeper. The CBS Television Quiz followed an answer-and-question format: contestants were given a clue and were asked to provide a question that the clue would answer. Beyond this, little is known about the show's mechanics.
- December 31- The antitrust division of the United States Department of Justice filed an antitrust action against NBC and CBS, seeking to break up the networks' methods of operation. Mutual, at the same time, filed an antitrust suit of its own, in the amount of $10.275 million, according to the January 12, 1942, edition of Time.

== Television programs ==
=== Debuts ===
Date	Debut	Network
July 1	CBS Television News	CBS
July 1	Truth or Consequences	WNBT
July 2	CBS Television Quiz	WCBW
December 19	America's Town Meeting of the Air	NBC
