= 1935 in American television =

This is a list of American television-related events in 1935.

== Events ==
- February - In a February 1935 legal decision, the inventor Philo Farnsworth is vindicated, successfully facing the patent interference suit brought against him by RCA in 1934. Farnsworth's high school chemistry teacher, Justin Tolman, produced a 1922 sketch as evidence that Farnsworth had been working on the principle of the image dissector and the development of an electronic television system since the early 1920s. Farnsworth won the suit; RCA appealed the decision in 1936 and lost. Farnsworth received royalties from RCA, but he never became wealthy.
- September 18 - In a memorandum dated September 18, 1935, the Blue Network subsidiary of NBC complained about its lack of access to broadcasts of the World Series. The report was followed by a letter dated October 5, 1935, in which Hearst Radio complained that Amos 'n' Andy and the Al Pearce programs had been moved from the Blue Network to the Red Network. Hearst further complained about the weakness of the Blue Network's programming at the time.
- Specific date unknown -
  - In 1935, tests for a 343-line television system started from New York City (W2XF on the Empire State Building), where NBC had converted a radio studio in the Rockefeller Center for television use. 343-line broadcasts were officially introduced by RCA and NBC on November 6, 1936.Systems with this number of lines were used with 30 interlaced frames per second by the United States from 1935 to 1938, when they were replaced by a 441-line television system.
  - In 1935, the Red Network subsidiary of NBC started live remote broadcasts of popular music. From 1935 to 1950, it presented numerous live remote broadcasts of popular music from ballrooms, hotels, supper clubs and Army camps. Among the band leaders with regular time slots on NBC were Carmen Cavallaro, Nat King Cole, Xavier Cugat, Tommy Dorsey, Eddy Duchin, Benny Goodman, Stan Kenton, Guy Lombardo, Glenn Miller, Leo Reisman, and Paul Whiteman.

== Sources ==
- Dunning, John (1998). "Band Remotes". On the Air: The Encyclopedia of Old-Time Radio. New York and Oxford: Oxford University Press. pp. 60–74. ISBN 0-19-507678-8.
- Schatzkin, Paul (2002). The Boy Who Invented Television: A Story of Inspiration, Persistence, and Quiet Passion. TeamCom Books. ISBN 1-928791-30-1.
