= 1936 in American television =

This is a list of American television-related events in 1936.

== Events ==
- May 13 - The NBC History Files at the Library of Congress support the notion that NBC was gradually groping for a way to differentiate the Red Network from the Blue Network. For example, they contain a confidential memorandum, dated May 13, 1936, which sets forth a network policy against mixing the Red and Blue network stations.
- June 15- On June 15, 1936, Don Lee Broadcasting began a one-month-long demonstration of high definition (240+ line) television in Los Angeles on W6XAO (later KTSL, now KCBS-TV) with a 300-line image from motion picture film. By October, W6XAO was making daily television broadcasts of films.
- July 7 - On July 7, 1936, RCA and its subsidiary NBC demonstrated in New York City a 343-line electronic television broadcast with live and film segments to its licensees.
- November 6- RCA made its first public demonstration of its electronic television to the press on November 6. Irregularly scheduled broadcasts continued through 1937 and 1938.
- December 14 - The first coaxial cables were laid between New York City and Philadelphia by the AT&T Corporation. The cables would transmit both television and telephone signals.
- Late 1936- In late 1936, the NBC publication Great and Growing Greater explains NBC's ongoing efforts to expand both the size and the quality of the stations under its Blue Network subsidiary.
