= 1939 in American television =

This is a list of American television-related events in 1939.

== Events ==
- April 30 -
  - Opening day of the 1939 New York World's Fair. David Sarnoff, then president of RCA and a strong advocate of television, chose to introduce television to the mass public at the RCA pavilion of the Fair. As a reflection of the wide range of technological innovation on parade at the fair, Franklin D. Roosevelt's speech was both broadcast over the various radio networks and televised, along with other parts of the opening ceremony and other events at the fair. That day, the opening ceremony and Roosevelt's speech were seen on black and white television sets with 5 to 12-inch tubes.
  - The exhibits of the 1939 New York World's Fair included early television sets.
- May 1 - Four models of RCA television sets went on sale to the general public in various department stores around New York City. The sets were promoted in a series of splashy newspaper ads.
- May – A U.S. patent is granted for Kálmán Tihanyi's transmitting tube. The patent for his receiving tube had already been granted in October 1938. Both patents had been purchased by the American electronics company RCA prior to their approval. Tihanyi's version of an electronic television consisted of a camera tube that accumulated and stored electrical charges ("photoelectrons") within the tube throughout each scanning cycle. Tihanyi's charge storage idea remains a basic principle in the design of imaging devices for television to the present day.
- September - RCA had previously filed a patent interference suit against Philo Farnsworth. In September 1939, after losing an appeal in the courts and still determined to go forward with the commercial manufacturing of television equipment, RCA agreed to pay Farnsworth US$1 million over a ten-year period, in addition to license payments, to use Farnsworth's television-related patents. With this historic agreement in place, RCA integrated much of what was best about the Farnsworth technology into their systems.
- November 8 – The CBS television station W2XAB resumes test transmission with an all-electronic system broadcast from the top of the Chrysler Building in New York City.
- Exact date unknown - In 1939, the Hungarian engineer Peter Carl Goldmark introduced an electro-mechanical television system while working at CBS, which contained an Iconoscope sensor. The CBS field-sequential color system was partly mechanical, with a disc made of red, blue, and green filters spinning inside the television camera at 1,200 rpm, and a similar disc spinning in synchronization in front of the cathode ray tube inside the receiver set. The innovation in the field of color television would not be publicized until September 1940.

== Sources ==
- Abramson, Albert (1987). The History of Television, 1880 to 1941. Jefferson, NC: McFarland & Co. ISBN 0-89950-284-9.
- Everson, George (1949). The Story of Television, The Life of Philo T. Farnsworth. New York: W. W. Norton & Co. ISBN 978-0-405-06042-7.
