= 1943 in American television =

This is a list of American television-related events in 1943.

== Events ==
- January 7 - The televised game show CBS Television Quiz ended on January 7, 1943, the day before WCBW temporarily shut down its studios and reverted to broadcasting only filmed material on an irregular basis until May 1944.
- May 1943- After losing on final appeal before the U.S. Supreme Court in May 1943, the Radio Corporation of America (RCA) sold Blue Network Company, Inc., for $8 million to the American Broadcasting System, a recently founded company owned by Life Savers magnate Edward J. Noble. After the sale was completed on October 12, 1943, Noble acquired the rights to the Blue Network name, leases on landlines, the New York studios, two-and-a-half radio stations (WJZ in Newark/New York City; KGO in San Francisco and WENR in Chicago, which shared a frequency with Prairie Farmer station WLS); contracts with actors; and agreements with around 60 affiliates. In turn, to comply with FCC radio station ownership limits of the time, Noble sold off his existing New York City radio station WMCA. Noble, who wanted a better name for the network, acquired the branding rights to the "American Broadcasting Company" name from George B. Storer in 1944. The Blue Network became ABC officially on June 15, 1945, after the sale was completed.
- May 10 - On May 10, 1943, the Supreme Court (National Broadcasting Co. v. United States, 319 U.S. 190) upheld the right of the Federal Communications Commission (FCC) to regulate practically everything that was radio, by sustaining the jurisdiction of the FCC to regulate the contractual relations of the major networks with affiliated stations.
- August 27 - The Congress of Industrial Organizations (CIO) filed a brief in a petition to intervene in the FCC proceedings on the network sale of the Blue Network. The CIO complained that the NAB code regarding "controversial" broadcasts inhibited its ability to buy airtime. While the FCC denied the CIO's petition to intervene, it did invite the CIO to give testimony in the hearings.
- October 17 - Following the sale of the Blue Network, the Department of Justice dropped its antitrust proceedings against NBC on October 17, 1943, having previously dropped proceedings against CBS on October 11, and the federal courts, upon its motion, dismissed Mutual's antitrust claims against CBS and NBC.
- December 28 - In an early step was to obtain a deep-pocketed backer for the Blue Network, Edward J. Noble sold a 12.5% stake to Time Inc., and a similar stake to advertising executive Chester J. LaRoche, for $500,000 each. Smaller stakes were taken by Blue Network executives Mark Woods (president) and Edgar Kobak (executive vice-president, who would the next year leave the Blue for Mutual).

== Television programs ==
=== Debuts ===
Date	Debut	Network
November 29	The Voice of Firestone Televues	WNBT
