= 1937 in American television =

This is a list of American television-related events in 1937.

== Events ==
- August- The Blue Network subsidiary of NBC broadcast a play cycle consisting of Eugene O'Neill's works, featuring the actress Helen Hayes.
- November 27 -The NBC broadcast The Three Garridebs, a television adaptation of the short story The Adventure of the Three Garridebs (1924) by Arthur Conan Doyle. Louis Hector played Sherlock Holmes, the first actor to do so on television. Outside of an opening scene using previously filmed footage of the London skyline, the bulk of the action took place on studio sets of 221B Baker Street and the home of Holmes' client Nathan Garrideb. Only three sets were built: 221B Baker Street, Nathan Garrideb's home and Inspector Lestrade's office. Previously filmed footage of Hector and William Podmore riding in a hansom cab was used to link the action on the sets.
- Date uncertain -
  - In 1936, RCA and its subsidiary NBC had demonstrated to their licensees in New York City a 343-line electronic television broadcast with live and film segments. In 1937, RCA raised the frame definition to 441 lines. Its executives petitioned the FCC for approval of the standard.
  - In 1926, Alan Archibald Campbell-Swinton had announced the results of experiments he had conducted with G. M. Minchin and J. C. M. Stanton. They had attempted to generate an electrical signal by projecting an image onto a selenium-coated metal plate that was simultaneously scanned by a cathode ray beam. In 1937, these experiments were repeated by two different teams, H. Miller and J. W. Strange from EMI, and H. Iams and A. Rose from RCA. Both teams succeeded in transmitting "very faint" images with the original Campbell-Swinton's selenium-coated plate. Although others had experimented with using a cathode-ray tube as a receiver, the concept of using one as a transmitter was novel.
  - The Blue Network subsidiary of NBC had finished an expansion phase, but was still smaller than its competitors. Having started with 7 stations in 1927, it had only 33 stations by 1937.
  - In this period, along with the NBC Symphony Orchestra broadcasts, the Metropolitan Opera radio broadcasts were part of the "crown jewels" of the Blue Network. A sober, dignified pamphlet issued by the network in 1937 stated that the broadcasts were under RCA sponsorship, and "[t]hrough the medium of nationwide NBC Network broadcasting, Grand Opera has been given to the entire nation. No longer is it reserved for the privileged few – now even the most isolated listeners throughout the United States are able to enjoy the world's finest music at their own firesides. The National Broadcasting Company (...) is proud to be the means of bringing the Metropolitan Opera to American radio listeners." The pamphlet notes that 78 stations broadcast these opera performances in 1937, and that reception for the program was "nationwide", something moderately unusual for an NBC Blue broadcast.

== Sources ==
- Blue Network Company (1943). The Blue Network Today; a Memorandum on Its First Independent Year, and Its Present Position in the American System of Broadcasting, with a Note on Blue History. New York: Blue Network Company, Inc. OCLC 43939184.
- Burns, R. W. (1998). Television: An International History of the Formative Years. IEE History of Technology Series. Vol. 22. London: Institution of Electrical Engineers. ISBN 0-85296-914-7.
