= 1942 in American television =

This is a list of American television-related events in 1942.

== Events ==
- January 8-
  - The televised game show CBS Television Quiz is reduced to a length of 55 minutes for the network to present a five-minute news summary at 9:25 PM.
  - NBC forms a separate corporate entity for the Blue Network on January 8, 1942, "Blue Network Company, Inc." From this date on, while NBC still maintained ownership of the Blue Network, it was for most purposes an entirely separate network. NBC Red at this point became known as simply NBC.
- February 1 - The state-owned news network Voice of America (VOA) is established. The station broadcasts to Nazi Germany, with a show called Stimmen aus Amerika ("Voices from America") which was transmitted on February 1, 1942. It was introduced by the "Battle Hymn of the Republic" and included the pledge: "Today, and every day from now on, we will be with you from America to talk about the war... The news may be good or bad for us – We will always tell you the truth."
- February 2 - CBS Television Quiz moves to be broadcast on Mondays and is now preceded by a civilian-defense program (later an American Red Cross program), which along with the news summary required the show itself to decrease to 50 minutes. The Red Cross program ended on March 30, allowing Quiz to re-expand to 55 minutes.
- March 10 - WCBW receives a full broadcast license, its construction permit and commercial program authorization.
- May- The WCBW scales back their programing at the end of this month, following a mandate several weeks earlier by the War Production Board to cease building television stations. CBS Television Quiz moves to Thursdays and Fridays and is again reduced to 50 minutes.
- June- The United States Supreme Court uphelds the jurisdiction of the FCC over the issuance of rules relating to chain broadcasting. While the FCC litigation continues in the wake of this ruling, the public and private antitrust litigation is held in abeyance.
- Date unknown- The cultural diplomacy programming on the Columbia Broadcasting System (CBS) launches the musical show Viva América (1942–49) which featured the Pan American Orchestra and the artistry of several noted musicians from both North and South America, including Alfredo Antonini, Juan Arvizu, Eva Garza, Elsa Miranda, Nestor Mesta Chaires, Miguel Sandoval, John Serry Sr., and Terig Tucci.
