= 1938 in American television =

This is a list of American television-related events in 1938.

== Events ==
- March 12 - Adolf Hitler boldly annexed Austria. The group of broadcast journalists known as the Murrow Boys of CBS quickly assembled coverage of the event, with William L. Shirer in London, Edgar Ansel Mowrer in Paris, Pierre Huss in Berlin, Frank Gervasi in Rome, and Robert Trout in New York City.
- April - Since 1936, RCA and its subsidiary NBC had started irregularly scheduled electronic television broadcasts. Regularly scheduled electronic broadcasts began in April 1938 in New York City (to the second week of June, and resuming in August) and Los Angeles.
- April 15 - Debut of the television series Vine Street, the first American television soap opera. It was broadcast by W6XAO in Los Angeles.
- May 31- The experimental television station W2XBS (now WNBC) in New York City broadcast the British film The Return of the Scarlet Pimpernel. It was the first time that a first-run film was shown on American television. However, the staff projectionist played the last reel out of order, ending the film 20 minutes early. After the incident, NBC could not obtain first-run films for many years.
- June 7- An excerpt from Susan and God is the first Broadway play with its original cast to be broadcast on television. Station W2XBS uses exact replicas of the stage sets, with Nancy Coleman, Gertrude Lawrence and Paul McGrath appearing on the broadcast.
- October 30 - CBS Radio gained a taste of infamy when The Mercury Theatre on the Air broadcast a radio adaptation of H. G. Wells' The War of the Worlds, performed and directed by the 23-year-old Orson Welles. Its unique format, a contemporary version of the story in the form of faux news broadcasts, allegedly told listeners that invaders from Mars were actually invading and devastating Grovers Mill, New Jersey, despite three disclaimers during the broadcast stating that it was a work of fiction. The flood of publicity after the broadcast had two effects: a 1992 FCC law banning faux news bulletins within dramatic programming, and sponsorship for The Mercury Theatre on the Air. The series' format was changed into The Campbell Playhouse in order to sell soup.
- November – Due to freak atmospheric conditions, a BBC TV broadcast from London is received in New York City. A film camera was used to record the silent images which included the performance of a play, a cartoon, and other matter. A four-minute excerpt from this filmed recording survives and is considered the only surviving example of a pre-World War II BBC television transmission.
- Date uncertain -
  - The Blue Network subsidiary of NBC struggles with falling revenues, due to being significantly smaller than its competitors. In 1938, Mutual had 107 affiliates, and CBS had 114. As of 1938, NBC had 23 stations in its core "Basic Red" group, and 24 in its "Basic Blue" group, with 107 stations that could be Red or Blue depending on the needs of a sponsor;
  - In 1938, the American company DuMont Laboratories began manufacturing televisions at a factory in Passaic, New Jersey.
  - In 1938, CBS acquired the American Record Corporation, the parent company of its one-time investor Columbia Records.
  - In 1938, NBC and CBS each opened broadcast studios on Sunset Boulevard in Hollywood in order to attract the entertainment industry's top talent to their networks.

== Sources ==
- Erik Barnouw (1966). A Tower in Babel: A History of Broadcasting in the United States to 1933. New York City: Oxford University Press. ISBN 978-0-19-500474-8.
