= 1973 in American television =

This is a list of American television-related events in 1973.

== Events ==
Date	Event	Ref.
March 11	Charlottesville, Virginia finally receives a television station when NBC affiliate WVIR-TV signs-on.	
March 23	Concentration, the longest-running game show at the time, airs for the 3,796th and final time on NBC, ending its run after 14 years and seven months. The show was the longest-running daytime game show to date until 1987, when the record was eclipsed by The Price is Right, which began its run in 1972.	
April 3	WIIL-TV (now WAWV-TV) signs on the air, giving the Terre Haute market its first full-time ABC affiliate.	
April 16	A TV documentary about the career of Paul McCartney, entitled James Paul McCartney, airs on ABC in the U.S.	
May 10	ABC concludes its initial run at broadcasting the National Basketball Association, marking the last NBA broadcast on ABC until the network regained the rights prior to the 2002–03 season. CBS would take over the over-the-air rights as the NBA's broadcast television partner the next season. ABC's final NBA broadcast sees the New York Knicks defeat the Los Angeles Lakers in Game 5 of the NBA Finals 102–93, which clinched the Knicks’ NBA Championship.	
May 17	Daytime television on ABC is interrupted by news coverage of the hearings pertaining to the Watergate scandal. Following ABC's coverage on this day, CBS televises the next day's hearings, followed the day after that by NBC. The three networks continue cycling coverage in this way until August 7.	
July 2	CBS debuts the 1970s version of Match Game, which will become the #1-rated daytime television program for 1973, 1974, and 1975, and the #1 game show for its first four years on the air.	
September 15	The fourth season of The Mary Tyler Moore Show premieres on CBS with Betty White making her first appearance on the show as Sue Ann Nivens.	
September 20	Billie Jean King defeats Bobby Riggs in a televised tennis match held at the Astrodome in Houston, Texas. Billed as The Battle of the Sexes, the global television audience, including viewers watching on ABC in the United States, is estimated at 90 million viewers in 36 countries.	
October 4	WMBB in Panama City, Florida signs-on the air, returning NBC to the market after WJHG-TV dropped that affiliation to become a full-time ABC affiliate the previous year.	
October 8	WHFV signs-on the air from Fredericksburg, Virginia as an NBC affiliate.	
November 20	The animated Thanksgiving special A Charlie Brown Thanksgiving premieres on CBS. It ends up winning an Emmy Award the following year.	
December 12	On CBS, Kojak’s trademark lollipop makes its debut in the episode “Dark Sunday”.	
December 19	After reading a news item that said the federal government had fallen behind in getting bids to supply toilet tissue, Johnny Carson inadvertently triggers an unprecedented three-week panic when he announces, on NBC's The Tonight Show, that there is an acute shortage of toilet paper in the United States. The panic was settled in January 1974.	
December 28	CBS affiliate KZTV in Corpus Christi, Texas signs-on satellite station KVTV, bringing CBS programming into the Laredo market.	

== Television programs ==
=== Debuting this year ===
Date	Title	Network
January 6	Schoolhouse Rock!	ABC
January 28	Barnaby Jones	CBS
March 20	Police Story	NBC
March 26	The Young and the Restless	CBS
March 26	The $10,000 Pyramid	CBS
July 17	The Wizard of Odds	NBC
July 17	The New Treasure Hunt	Syndicated
September 8	Star Trek: The Animated Series	NBC
September 8	Super Friends	ABC
September 10	Lotsa Luck	NBC
September 14	Adam's Rib	ABC
September 21	Needles and Pins	NBC
October 3	Love Story	NBC
October 15	The Tomorrow Show	NBC
October 24	Kojak	CBS
	Greatest Sports Legends	Syndicated

=== Ending this year ===
Date	Show	Debut	
January 7	The Moonstone	1972	
January 16	Bonanza	1959	
March 1	The Mod Squad	1968	
March 3	Bridget Loves Bernie	1972	
March 12	Rowan & Martin's Laugh-In	1968	
March 12	The Doris Day Show	1968	
March 23	Love is a Many Splendored Thing	1967	
March 23	Where the Heart Is	1969	
March 24	Lassie	1954	
March 30	Ghost Story	1972	
March 30	Mission: Impossible	1966	
May 20	Laugh-In	1968	
September 2	Lidsville	1968	1971
September 9	The Doris Day Show	1968	
September 9	Bridget Loves Bernie	1972	
September 9	Runaround	1972	
October 27	The New Scooby-Doo Movies	1972	
December 28	Adam's Rib	1973	
December 28	Needles and Pins	1973	

== Networks and services ==
=== Network launches ===
Network	Type	Launch date	Notes	Source
Trinity Broadcasting Network	Cable/satellite and over-the-air	Unknown date	Founded by Paul Crouch, the station began after he purchased KLXA-TV to start a religious television network by converting the former independent station into the network's flagship, which eventually became KTBN-TV.	
Star Channel	Cable television	April 1	Now The Movie Channel	
MGM Family Network	Cable television	9 September		

== Television stations ==
=== Sign-ons ===
Date	City of License/Market	Station	Channel	Affiliation	Notes/Ref.
February 22	Greensboro, North Carolina	WUNL-TV	26	PBS via UNC-TV	
March 11	Charlottesville, Virginia	WVIR-TV	29	NBC	
April 3	Terre Haute, Indiana	WIIL-TV	38	ABC	
May 30	Youngstown, Ohio	WNEO	45	PBS	
June 2	Montclair, New Jersey	WNJN	50	PBS	Part of the New Jersey Network
June 2	New Brunswick/Trenton, New Jersey	WNJB	58	PBS	Part of the New Jersey Network
June 29	Las Cruces, New Mexico	KRWG-TV	22	PBS	
July 26	Zanesville, Ohio	WOUC-TV	44	PBS	Satellite of WOUB-TV in Columbus, Ohio
September 16	Eagle Butte, South Dakota	KPSD-TV	13	PBS	Part of South Dakota Public Broadcasting
October	Portsmouth, Ohio (Huntington, West Virginia/Ashland, Kentucky)	WPBO-TV	42	PBS	
October 4	Panama City, Florida	WDTB-TV	13	NBC	
October 8	Fredericksburg, Virginia	WHFV	69	NBC	
November 5	Los Angeles, California	KLCS	58	PBS	
November 18	New York City	WSNL-TV	67	Independent	
December 28	Laredo, Texas	KVTV	13	CBS	

=== Network affiliation changes ===
Date	City of license/Market	Station	Channel	Old affiliation	New affiliation	Notes/Ref.
October 4	Panama City, Florida	WJHG	7	NBC (primary); ABC (secondary)	ABC (exclusive)	Rejoined NBC in 1982
Unknown date	Fayetteville, Arkansas	KNAC-TV	5	NBC (exclusive)	NBC (primary); ABC (secondary)	
Unknown date	Fontana, California/Los Angeles, California	KLXA-TV	40	Bilingual independent	TBN (O&O)	Licensed reassigned to Santa Ana in 1983, became KTBN-TV in 1977

=== Station closures ===
Date	City of license/Market	Station	Channel	Affiliation	Sign-on date	Notes
December 7	Fayetteville, Arkansas	KGTM-TV		NBC	February 8, 1969	
Unknown date	LaSalle, Illinois	WEEQ	35	NBC	November 7, 1957	Satellite of WEEK-TV/Peoria, Illinois

== See also ==
- 1973 in television
- 1973 in film
- List of American films of 1973
- 1972-73 United States network television schedule
- 1973-74 United States network television schedule
