= 1965 in American television =

This is a list of American television-related events in 1965.

== Events ==
Date	Event	Ref.
January 1	Comedian Soupy Sales, who hosted the "Lunch With Soupy Sales" children's program on New York City's WNEW-TV, encourages his young viewers to send him money ("those funny little green pieces of paper with pictures of U.S. presidents") from their parents' pants and pocketbooks and send them to him, and in return he would "send you a postcard from Puerto Rico!" Days later, when he actually got response, he declared that he was joking and that cash contributions would be donated to charity. WNEW suspended Sales for two weeks over the incident.	
January 2	The TVS Television Network begins broadcasting weekly coverage of men's basketball games of the NCAA's Southeastern Conference as part of a live regional syndication package for the first time throughout much of the Southeastern United States, including Kentucky, Tennessee, Georgia, Florida, Alabama, Mississippi, and Louisiana. The TVS broadcasts of SEC Basketball would last until after the 1983 SEC Tournament, when Sports Productions, Incorporated took over the broadcasts in January 1984. The SEC basketball package would continue to be broadcast through Lorimar Television, Jefferson Pilot Sports, Lincoln Financial Media, and Raycom Sports until after the 2009 SEC Tournament semifinals.	
February 22	A new, videotaped production of the 1957 special, Cinderella, by Richard Rodgers and Oscar Hammerstein II, airs on CBS with young Lesley Ann Warren (in the title role) starring alongside Ginger Rogers, Walter Pidgeon, and Celeste Holm.	
April 5	The Match Game became the next-to-last NBC game show to made the transition from black and white to color.	
June 4	The launch of the Gemini 4 space mission is broadcast in color by NBC. All three networks would carry the launch of Gemini 5 in color that August, followed by all subsequent crewed space launches.	
September 10	CBS airs the first-ever National Geographic television special. The special focused on a 1963 U.S. expedition to Mount Everest.	
September 12	NBC becomes the main broadcast partner for the American Football League, with most games being broadcast in color. AFL games were previously broadcast on ABC for the league's first five seasons.	
September 13	Today on NBC becomes the first morning news program to telecast in color.	
October 4	Pope Paul VI's visit to New York receives saturation television coverage on all three American networks. The Papal Mass at Yankee Stadium is broadcast in color.	
November 15	The Huntley-Brinkley Report on NBC becomes the first network evening newscast to be broadcast in color on a nightly basis.	
November 25	The CBS Thanksgiving Day telecast of an NFL game between the Baltimore Colts and the Detroit Lions is the first color telecast of a regular season game.	
December 9	The Peanuts special, A Charlie Brown Christmas, is broadcast for the first time ever on CBS. The network would air the special on an annual basis until ABC picked up the rights in 2002.	
December 21	CBS airs the New York City Ballet's televised production of The Nutcracker.	

=== Other notable events in 1965 ===
- The New York City market's WOR-TV launches a cable television feed of the station's programming to be distributed nationwide, known as the WOR-TV EMI Service.

== Television programs ==
=== Debuts ===
Date	Debut	Network
January 12	Hullabaloo	NBC
January 24	Branded	NBC
March 29	I'll Bet	NBC
June 28	Where the Action Is	ABC
September 9	The Atom Ant/Secret Squirrel Show	NBC
September 11	Sinbad Jr. and his Magic Belt	Syndication
September 12	Secret Squirrel	NBC
September 13	The Legend of Jesse James	ABC
September 13	A Man Called Shenandoah	ABC
September 13	Run for Your Life	NBC
September 14	F Troop	ABC
September 14	My Mother the Car	NBC
September 14	Please Don't Eat the Daisies	NBC
September 15	The Big Valley	ABC
September 15	Gidget	ABC
September 15	Green Acres	CBS
September 15	I Spy	NBC
September 15	Lost in Space	CBS
September 16	Laredo	NBC
September 16	The Long, Hot Summer	ABC
September 16	Mona McCluskey	NBC
September 17	Camp Runamuck	NBC
September 17	Hank	NBC
September 17	Hogan's Heroes	CBS
September 17	Honey West	ABC
September 17	Mister Roberts	NBC
September 17	The Smothers Brothers Show	CBS
September 17	Tammy	ABC
September 18	Get Smart	NBC
September 18	I Dream of Jeannie	NBC
September 18	The Loner	CBS
September 18	The Trials of O'Brien	CBS
September 19	The F.B.I.	ABC
September 19	The Wackiest Ship in the Army	NBC
September 25	The Beatles	ABC
October	The New 3 Stooges	Syndication
October 2	Atom Ant	NBC
October 2	The Hillbilly Bears	NBC
October 2	Precious Pupp	NBC
October 2	Squiddly Diddly	NBC
October 2	Winsome Witch	NBC
October 9	Milton the Monster	ABC
November 8	Days of Our Lives	NBC
December 20	Commander Tom Show	WKBW-TV
December 20	The Dating Game	ABC

=== Changes of network affiliation ===
Show	Moved from	Moved to
My Three Sons	ABC	CBS
Hazel	NBC	CBS

=== Ending this year ===
Date	Show	Network	Debut	Notes
January 4	90 Bristol Court	NBC	October 5, 1964	
January 4	Harris Against the World	NBC	October 5, 1964	
January 4	Tom, Dick and Mary	NBC	October 5, 1964	
January 16	The Outer Limits	ABC	September 16, 1963	
January 17	The Bill Dana Show	NBC	September 22, 1963	
March 11	Jonny Quest	ABC	September 18, 1964	
March 14	The Porky Pig Show	ABC	September 20, 1964	Repeats continued on ABC through 1967
March 30	The Joey Bishop Show	CBS	September 20, 1961 (on NBC)	
April 10	Kentucky Jones	NBC	September 19, 1964	
April 19	Karen	NBC	October 5, 1964	
April 21	The Cara Williams Show	CBS	September 23, 1964	
April 27	Mr. Novak	NBC	September 24, 1963	
May 2	Wagon Train	ABC	September 18, 1957 (on NBC)	
May 11	The Nurses	CBS	September 27, 1962	
May 22	The Jack Benny Program	CBS	October 28, 1950	
July 1	Kraft Suspense Theatre	NBC	October 10, 1963	
September 3	The Price Is Right	ABC	November 26, 1956	Returned in 1972 on CBS as The New Price Is Right
September 6	Summer Playhouse	CBS	July 4, 1964	
September 24	I'll Bet	NBC	March 29, 1965	
November 9	ABC's Nightlife	ABC	November 9, 1964	
December 25	The Magilla Gorilla Show	ABC	1964	Network and syndicated reruns continued through 1967

=== Television films, specials and miniseries ===
Title	Network	Date(s) of airing	Notes/Ref.
A Charlie Brown Christmas	CBS	December 9	Reruns of this special became a holiday tradition in subsequent years until 2021.

== Networks and services ==
=== Network launches ===
Network	Type	Launch date	Source/Notes
Idaho Public Television	Regional educational television network	September 6	
TVS Television Network	Ad-hoc syndicated television network	Unknown date	Syndicator of college basketball broadcasts from several conferences, including the SEC. Pacific 8, Big 8, and a few others.
WOR-TV EMI Service	Regional superstation feed of WOR-TV/Secaucus, New Jersey	Unknown date	Microwave relay of the WOR-TV signal from the studio to cable providers located in markets immediately surrounding the New York City metropolitan area, reaching as far west as Buffalo, New York, and as far south as Delaware, as well as throughout New England.

== Television stations ==
=== Sign-ons ===
Date	City of License/Market	Station	Channel	Affiliation	Notes/Ref.
February 7	Cleveland, Ohio	WVIZ	25	NET	
February 12	Austin, Texas	KHFI-TV	42	Independent	Now on channel 36
March 1	State College, Pennsylvania	WPSX-TV	3	NET	
March 15	Orlando, Florida	WMFE-TV	24	NET	
March 21	Los Angeles, California	KPOL-TV	22	Independent (English language)	
May 4	Minneapolis/St. Paul, Minnesota	KTCI	17	NET	
May 6	Linden, New Jersey/New York City, New York	WNJU-TV	47	Independent	
May 16	Philadelphia, Pennsylvania	WIBF-TV	29	Independent	
June 12	Wausau, Wisconsin	WAOW	9	ABC	
July 18	St. Petersburg-Tampa, Florida	WLCY-TV	10	Independent	
August 27	Charlotte, North Carolina	WTVI	42	NET	
September	Chicago, Illinois	WXXW	20	Instructional independent	
September 1	Burlington, New Jersey (Philadelphia, Pennsylvania)	WKBS-TV	48	Independent	
September 1	Terre Haute, Indiana	WTWO	2	NBC (primary); ABC (secondary)	
September 6	Lexington, Nebraska	KLNE-TV	3	NET	Part of Nebraska ETV
September 7	Allentown, Pennsylvania	WLVT	39	NET	
September 12	Rockford, Illinois	WCEE-TV	23	CBS	
September 15	Calais, Maine	WMED-TV	13	NET	Part of the Maine Public Broadcasting Network
September 17	Philadelphia, Pennsylvania	WPHL-TV	17	Independent	
September 20	Chicago, Illinois	WXXW	20	NET	
October 1	Superior, Nebraska	KSNB-TV	4	ABC	
October 15	Bangor, Maine	WVII-TV	7	ABC	
October 17	Birmingham, Alabama	WBMG	42	CBS (primary); NBC (secondary)	
October 19	Omaha, Nebraska	KYNE-TV	17	NET	Part of Nebraska ETV
October 21	Topeka, Kansas	KTWU	13	NET	
October 27	Tuscaloosa, Alabama	WCFT-TV	33	Independent	
November 10	Christiansted, U.S. Virgin Islands	WSVI-TV	8	ABC	
November 14	San Diego, California	KAAR	39	Independent	
November 15	Huntsville, Alabama	WHIQ	25	NET	Part of the Alabama Public Television network
November 15	Salt Lake City, Utah	KBYU-TV	11	NET	
December 20	Syracuse, New York	WCNY-TV	24	NET	

=== Network affiliation changes ===
Date	City of license/Market	Station	Channel	Old affiliation	New affiliation	Notes/Ref.
June 12	Wausau, Wisconsin	WSAW-TV	7	CBS (primary); ABC and NBC (secondary)	CBS (primary); NBC (secondary)	ABC programming dropped upon the sign-on of WAOW.
September 1	St. Petersburg-Tampa, Florida	WLCY-TV	10	Independent	ABC	
September 1	St. Petersburg-Tampa, Florida	WSUN-TV	38	ABC	Independent	
September 12	Rockford, Illinois	WREX-TV	13	CBS (primary); ABC (secondary)	ABC (exclusive)	
Unknown date	Dayton, Ohio	WONE-TV	22	Independent	ABC	
Unknown date	Jonesboro, Arkansas	KAIT	8	Independent	ABC	

=== Station closures ===
Date	City of license/Market	Station	Channel	Affiliation	Sign-on date	Notes
August 11	Elk City, Oklahoma	KSWB	8	CBS	August 7, 1961	
November 1	Salina, Kansas	KSLN-TV	34	ABC	January 2, 1962	
