= 1970 in American television =

This is a list of American television-related events in 1970.

== Events ==
Date	Event	Ref.
January 1	WXTV becomes a full time Spanish-language station based in Paterson, New Jersey, which it remains into the 21st century. In this case, it becomes an affiliate of SIN, the network's first affiliate east of the Mississippi River.	
January 19	CBS launches Operation 100, a plan to beat NBC’s ratings in the last 100 days of the 1969-70 television season. This plan was accompanied with the slogan, “The man can’t bust our network.”	
March 7	The “eclipse of the century,” which occurred on the East Coast of the United States, is covered by the news departments of all three American networks (ABC, CBS, and NBC).	
March 16	The FCC closes the “Miami channel 10” case as the station becomes WPLG.	
July 31	Chet Huntley anchors his final newscast with David Brinkley and retires, bringing down the curtain on a 14-year career at NBC News and, thus, as chief anchor of The Huntley-Brinkley Report. The next Monday, August 3, the program is renamed NBC Nightly News, its current title as of 2022.	
August 2	NBC expands full-service newscasts to seven nights a week with NBC Sunday News; it replaces The Frank McGee Report.	
September 5	The Banana Splits Adventure Hour airs on NBC for the last time, airing the same Christmas Special, which was previously shown on December 13, the previous year. Freeform aired it again on New Year's Eve in 2016.	
October 5	The Public Broadcasting Service (PBS) goes on the air for the first time as the replacement for its predecessor National Educational Television (NET). Most NET member stations joined PBS upon the latter's sign-on.	

== Television programs ==
=== Debuts ===
Date	Debut	Network
January 5	All My Children	ABC
January 30	The Tim Conway Show	CBS
February 17	McCloud	NBC
March 30	A World Apart	ABC
March 30	The Best of Everything	ABC
March 30	Somerset	NBC
September 12	Josie and the Pussycats	CBS
September 17	The Flip Wilson Show	NBC
September 17	Nancy	NBC
September 19	The Mary Tyler Moore Show	CBS
September 20	The Tim Conway Comedy Hour	CBS
September 21	NFL Monday Night Football	ABC
September 24	Barefoot in the Park	ABC
September 24	The Odd Couple	ABC
September 25	The Partridge Family	ABC

=== Ending this year ===
Date	Program	Network	First aired	Status	Notes/References
January 3	Dastardly and Muttley in Their Flying Machines	CBS	1969	Ended	
January 17	The Perils of Penelope Pitstop	CBS	1969	Ended	
January 23	The Good Guys	CBS	1968	Ended	
February 7	The Hollywood Palace	ABC	1964	Ended	
February 10	CBS Playhouse	CBS	1967	Ended	
March 13	The Ghost & Mrs. Muir	ABC	1968 (on NBC)	Ended	
April 3	The Flying Nun	ABC	1967	Ended	
April 3	Here Come the Brides	ABC	1968	Canceled	
April 4	Petticoat Junction	CBS	1963	Ended	
April 16	Dragnet	NBC	January 12, 1967	Ended	
April 24	Death Valley Days	Syndication	1952	Ended	
May 7	Daniel Boone	NBC	1964	Ended	
May 15	Get Smart	NBC	1965	Ended	
May 26	I Dream of Jeannie	NBC	1965	Ended	
June 12	The Tim Conway Show	CBS	1970	Ended	
June 14	Spider-Man	ABC	1967	Ended	
July 31	The Huntley–Brinkley Report	NBC	1956	Ended	
September 5	The Banana Splits	NBC	1970	Ended	
September 5	The New Adventures of Superman	CBS	1966	Ended	
September 27	The Original Amateur Hour	CBS	1970	Ended	
October 31	Scooby-Doo, Where Are You!	CBS	1969	Canceled	Returned in 1978 as The Scooby-Doo Show on ABC
December 13	The Tim Conway Comedy Hour	CBS	1970	Ended	
December 17	Barefoot in the Park	ABC	1970	Ended	
December 19	H.R. Pufnstuf	NBC	1969	Canceled	The show remained on the NBC Saturday morning schedule in reruns until August 1972.

== Networks and services ==
=== Network launches ===
Network	Type	Launch date	Notes	Source
PBS	Over-the-air public television	October 5	PBS was launched to replace the National Educational Television service. Most NET member stations signed up to become PBS member stations upon the network's launch.	

=== Network closures ===
End date	Network	Type	First air date	Notes/references
October 5	National Educational Television	Over-the-air public television	May 16, 1954	

== Television stations ==
=== Sign-ons ===
Date	City of License/Market	Station	Channel	Affiliation	Notes/Ref.
January 1	Hagerstown, Maryland	WHAG-TV	25	NBC	Now an independent station
January 1	Marlborough, New Hampshire (Boston, Massachusetts)	WSMW-TV	27	Independent	
January 5	Wichita, Kansas	KPTS	8	NET	Became a PBS member station on October 5.
February 1	Jackson, Mississippi	WMAA-TV	29	NET	Flagship of Mississippi ETV; became a PBS member station on October 5.
February 8	Iowa City/Cedar Rapids, Iowa	KIIN	12	NET	Part of Iowa Public Television; became a PBS member station on October 5.
February 15	College Station/Bryan, Texas	KAMU	12	NET	Became a PBS member station on October 5.
February 24	Bend, Oregon	KVDO-TV	3	Independent	
February 28	Utica, New York	WUTR	20	ABC	
March 4	Chattanooga, Tennessee	WTCI	45	NET	Became a PBS member on October 5.
March 5	Evansville, Indiana	WNIN	9	NET	Became a PBS member on October 5.
March 7	La Crosse, Wisconsin	WXOW	19	ABC	
April 5	Chicago, Illinois	WSNS-TV	44	Independent	
May	Salina, Kansas	K06LZ	6	NBC	Originally a low-power translator of KSNW/Wichita
May 2	Flagstaff, Arizona	KOAI-TV	2	NBC	
May 12	Butte, Montana	KTVM	6	NBC	
June 1	Dubuque, Iowa	KDUB-TV	40	ABC	
July 18	Savannah, Georgia	WJCL-TV	22	ABC	
August 1	Pierre, South Dakota	KTSD-TV	10	NET	Part of South Dakota Public Broadcasting; became a PBS member station on October 5.
August 7	Dothan, Alabama	WDHN-TV	18	ABC	
August 10	Kansas City, Missouri	KBMA-TV	41	Independent	now an NBC affiliate
August 31	Louisville, Kentucky	WKMJ-TV	68	NET	Satellite of WKLE/Lexington, Kentucky as part of the Kentucky Educational Television network; became a PBS member on October 5.
September 13	Demopolis, Alabama	WIIQ	41	NET	Part of the Alabama Public Television network; became a PBS member three weeks later.
September 21	Yakima, Washington	KAPP	35	ABC	
October 3	Jackson, Mississippi	WAPT	16	ABC	
October 4	Indianapolis, Indiana	WFYI	20	NET	Became a PBS member station the day after its inaugural sign-on.
October 29	Columbus, Georgia (Auburn, Alabama)	WYEA-TV	38	NBC	
October 29	Kennewick, Washington	KVEW	42	ABC	Semi-satellite of KAPP/Yakima
October 30	Hagåtña, Guam (Agana)	KGTF	12	PBS	
November 1	Grandview/Bluefield/Beckley, West Virginia	WSWP	9	PBS	Part of the West Virginia Public Broadcasting television network
November 23	Belton, Texas	KNCT	46	PBS	
December 21	Buffalo, New York	WUTV	29	Independent	Now a Fox network affiliate.
Unknown date	Missoula, Montana	KPAX-TV	8	CBS (primary); ABC (secondary)	
Unknown date	New York City	W53AA	53	CBS	Low-powered translator of WCBS-TV; now Azteca America affiliate WKOB-LD on channel 42
Unknown date	Port Jervis, New York	W64AA	64	Independent	Low-powered translator of WNEW; now Estrella TV affiliate WASA-LD on channel 24
Unknown date	New York City	W73AP	73	Independent	Low-powered translator of WPIX; now First Nations Experience affiliate WNDT-CD on channel 14

=== Network affiliation changes ===
Date	City of license/Market	Station	Channel	Old affiliation	New affiliation	Notes/Ref.
January 1	Paterson, New Jersey (New York City, New York)	WXTV	41	Bilingual independent	Spanish International Network	
February 1	El Centro, California (Yuma, Arizona)	KECY-TV	9	ABC	CBS	Change occurred due to the shutdown of previous NBC affiliate KIVA.
February 1	Yuma, Arizona	KBLU-TV	13	CBS	NBC	Change occurred due to the shutdown of previous NBC affiliate KIVA.
May 31	Birmingham, Alabama	WAPI-TV	13	NBC (primary); CBS (secondary)	NBC (exclusive)	
May 31	Anniston, Alabama	WHMA	40	CBS (primary); NBC (secondary)	CBS (exclusive)	
May 31	Birmingham, Alabama	WBMG	42	CBS (primary); NBC (secondary)	CBS (exclusive)	
May 31	Tuscaloosa, Alabama	WCFT-TV	33	Independent	CBS	
September 13	Rapid City, South Dakota	KOTA-TV	23	CBS	ABC and NBC (joint primary)	
September 13	Rapid City, South Dakota	KRSD-TV	3	NBC	CBS	
October 3	Jackson, Mississippi	WLBT	3	NBC (primary); ABC (secondary)	NBC (exclusive)	
Unknown date	Anchorage, Alaska	KHAR-TV	13	Independent	NBC	
Unknown date	Anchorage, Alaska	KTVA	11	CBS (primary); NBC (secondary)	CBS (exclusive)	
Unknown date	Kalispell, Montana	KCFW	9	CBS (primary); ABC (secondary)	NBC (primary); ABC (secondary)	
Unknown date	Missoula, Montana	KECI-TV	13	CBS (primary); ABC (secondary)	NBC (primary); ABC (secondary)	
Unknown date	Miles City-Billings, Montana	KYUS-TV	3	Independent	NBC	
Unknown date	Pasco, Washington	KEPR	19	CBS (primary); ABC (secondary)	CBS (exclusive)	Semi-satellite of KIMA/Yakima
Unknown date	Richland, Washington	KNDU	25	ABC (primary); NBC (secondary)	NBC (exclusive)	Semi-satellite of KNDO/Yakima
Unknown date	Yakima, Washington	KIMA	29	CBS (primary); ABC (secondary)	CBS (exclusive)	
Unknown date	Yakima, Washington	KNDO	23	ABC (primary); NBC (secondary)	NBC (exclusive)	
Unknown date	Hazard, Kentucky	WKYH-TV	57	Independent	NBC	

=== Station closures ===
Date	City of license/Market	Station	Channel	Affiliation	Sign-on date	Notes
January 31	Yuma, Arizona	KIVA	11	NBC	October 8, 1953	
February 6	Fort Lauderdale, Florida	WSMS-TV	51	Independent	December 6, 1968	Returned to air February 14, 1972, as WKID
February 23	St. Petersburg, Florida	WSUN-TV	38	Independent	May 5, 1953	
March 18	Nacogdoches, Texas	KAEC-TV	19	CBS	July 30, 1969	
June	Manchester, New Hampshire	WXPO-TV	50	Independent	November 6, 1969	
July 26	Greensboro, North Carolina	WUBC	48	Independent	November 6, 1967	
September 1	Richardson, Texas	KRET-TV	23	Educational independent	February 29, 1960	

== See also ==
- 1970 in television
- 1970 in film
- 1970 in the United states
- List of American films of 1970
