= 1964 in American television =

This is a list of American television-related events in 1964.

== Events ==
Date	Event	Ref.
January 29	ABC begins broadcasting with the coverage of the 1964 Winter Olympics opening ceremony in Innsbruck, Austria.	
February 9-23	The Beatles’ appearances on CBS’s The Ed Sullivan Show set new records in terms of television ratings.	
April 30	Television sets manufactured in the United States as of this date are required to receive UHF channels.	
June 4	Sylvania unveils a revolutionary color TV picture tube in which europium-bearing phosphor allows a much brighter display.	
June 6	The Rolling Stones make their American television debut on ABC, during the variety show The Hollywood Palace.	
September 7	As part of Lyndon B. Johnson’s presidential campaign, the ”Daisy”advertisement is broadcast on network television.	
October 10	Through the facilities of geostationary communication satellite Syncom 3, NBC’s first stint as the official Olympic broadcaster begins with the network’s coverage of the 1964 Summer Olympics opening ceremony in Tokyo, Japan.	
October 18	Jackie Mason seemingly gives the finger on The Ed Sullivan Show in his only appearance on that program as he was banned from the show afterwards.	
October 25	Ed Sullivan insists that he would never have The Rolling Stones on his show following their appearance on that program. Despite that, the Stones would make a further five appearances on The Ed Sullivan Show.	
October 27	Ronald Reagan delivers a televised speech endorsing Barry Goldwater in the upcoming election.	
December 6	The stop-motion animated Christmas special, Rudolph the Red-Nosed Reindeer, premieres on NBC. It goes on to become a holiday tradition with annual reruns, especially after moving to CBS eight years later.	
December 15	Major League Baseball announces that it has signed a two-year contract with ABC worth $12.2 million. ABC is slated to televise 25 games on Saturday nights per year, with additional games on Independence Day and Labor Day.	

== Television programs ==
=== Debuts ===
Date	Debut	Network	Notes
January 4	The Hollywood Palace	ABC	
January 14	The Magilla Gorilla Show	Syndication	
March 30	Jeopardy!	NBC	
May 4	Another World	NBC	
July 4	Summer Playhouse	CBS	
September 14	Voyage to the Bottom of the Sea	ABC	
September 15	Peyton Place	ABC	
September 16	Shindig!	ABC	
September 16	The Peter Potamus Show	Syndication	
September 17	Bewitched	ABC	
September 18	Jonny Quest	ABC	
September 18	The Addams Family	ABC	
September 19	Flipper	NBC	
September 19	Kentucky Jones	NBC	
September 22	The Man from U.N.C.L.E.	NBC	
September 23	The Cara Williams Show	CBS	
September 24	Daniel Boone	NBC	
September 24	The Munsters	CBS	
September 25	Gomer Pyle, U.S.M.C.	CBS	
September 25	Nightmare Theatre	KIRO	
September 26	Gilligan's Island	CBS	
October 3	Underdog	NBC	
October 5	90 Bristol Court	NBC	
October 5	Harris Against the World	NBC	
October 5	Karen	NBC	
October 5	Tom, Dick, and Mary	NBC	
November 9	The Les Crane Show	ABC	
November 9	The Porky Pig Show	ABC	

=== Ending this year ===
Date	Show	Network	Debut	Notes
January 1	Fractured Flickers	Syndication	January 1, 1963	
February 7	77 Sunset Strip	ABC	October 10, 1958	
February 29	The New Casper Cartoon Show	ABC	September 7, 1963	
March 15	The Travels of Jaimie McPheeters	ABC	September 29, 1963	
March 29	The Judy Garland Show	CBS	September 29, 1963	
April 2	Temple Houston	NBC	September 19, 1963	
April 8	Channing	ABC	September 18, 1963	
April 18	The Lieutenant	NBC	September 14, 1963	
April 22	The Eleventh Hour	NBC	October 3, 1962	
April 25	The New Phil Silvers Show	CBS	September 28, 1963	
April 27	The Danny Thomas Show	CBS	September 29, 1953	
April 27	Breaking Point	ABC	September 16, 1963	
April 27	East Side West Side	CBS	September 23, 1963	
April 28	The Greatest Show on Earth	ABC	September 17, 1963	
May 1	The Great Adventure	CBS	September 27, 1963	
May 3	Grindl	NBC	September 15, 1963	
May 18	Hollywood and the Stars	NBC	September 30, 1963	
June 19	Mack & Myer for Hire	Syndication	1963	
June 19	The Twilight Zone	CBS	October 2, 1959	
June 26	Your First Impression	NBC	January 2, 1962	
June 27	The Adventures of Rocky and Bullwinkle and Friends	NBC	November 19, 1959	
July 6	The Steve Allen Show	Syndication	June 24, 1956 (on NBC)	
August 30	The DuPont Show of the Week	NBC	September 17, 1961	
September 2	Espionage	NBC	October 2, 1963	
September 6	Arrest and Trial	ABC	September 15, 1963	
September 12	Hootenanny	ABC	April 6, 1963	
December 31	Deputy Dawg	CBS	January 1, 1960	
Unknown date	Mack & Myer for Hire	Syndication	1963	

=== Television films, specials and miniseries ===
Title	Network	Date(s) of airing	Notes/Ref.
Rudolph the Red-Nosed Reindeer	NBC	December 6	Reruns of the special becomes holiday tradition in subsequent years; moved to CBS in 1972; but returned to NBC in 2024.

== Television stations ==
=== Sign-ons ===
Date	City of License/Market	Station	Channel	Affiliation	Notes/Ref.
January 1	Walker, Minnesota	KNMT	12	NBC (primary); ABC (secondary)	Now CBS as KCCW-TV, a satellite of WCCO-TV/Minneapolis
January 19	Charleston, South Carolina	WITV	7	NET	Part of the South Carolina ETV network
January 19	Fargo, North Dakota	KFME	13	NET	Later became the flagship of the Prairie Public Television network.
February 1	Montgomery, Alabama	WNCF	32	ABC	
February 6	Chicago, Illinois	WCIU-TV	23	Independent	
February 10	Bowling Green, Ohio	WBGU-TV	27	NET	
February 17	Presque Isle, Maine	WMEM-TV	10	NET	Part of the Maine Public Broadcasting Network
March 16	Santa Maria/Santa Barbara, California	KCOY-TV	12	NBC (primary); CBS (secondary)	
May 4	Corpus Christi, Texas	KIII	3	ABC	
June	Dallas, Texas	KAEI-TV	29	Independent (stock quotes)	
August 10	Columbus, Georgia	WJSP-TV	28	NET/GPB	
August 22	Dayton, Ohio	WONE-TV	22	Independent	
September 1	Duluth, Minnesota	WDSE	8	NET	
September 10	Richmond, Virginia	WCVE-TV	23	NET	
September 28	Los Angeles, California	KCET	28	NET	
October 1	San Juan, Puerto Rico	WTSJ-TV	32	NBC	
October 5	Pago Pago, American Samoa	KVZK-2	2	NET	
October 5	Pago Pago, American Samoa	KVZK-4	4	CBS (primary); ABC (secondary)	
October 5	Pago Pago, American Samoa	KVZK-5	5	NBC	
October 5	Pago Pago, American Samoa	KVZK-8	8	unknown	
October 5	Pago Pago, American Samoa	KVZK-10	10	unknown	
October 5	Pago Pago, American Samoa	KVZK-12	12	unknown	
October 5	Redding, California	KIXE-TV	9	NET	
October 12	Boston, Massachusetts	WIHS-TV	38	Independent	
October 12	Flint, Michigan	WUCX-TV	19	NET	
October 12	San Mateo, California	KCSM-TV	60	NET	
October 19	San Jose/San Francisco, California	KQEH	54	NET	
October 28	Garden City, Kansas	KUPK-TV	13	ABC	Full-power satellite of KAKE/Wichita
October 30	Wilmington, North Carolina	WWAY	3	ABC	
November 18	Mobile, Alabama	WEIQ	42	NET	Part of the Alabama Public Television network
November 22	Harrisburg, Pennsylvania	WITF-TV	33	NET	
December 3	Albion/Lincoln, Nebraska	KHQL-TV	8	ABC	Satellite of KHGI-TV/Kearney
December 6	La Grande, Oregon	KTVR	13	NBC (primary); ABC (secondary)	Signed on as a satellite of KTVB/Boise, Idaho
Unknown date	South Bend, Indiana	W39AA	39	NET	

=== Network affiliation changes ===
Date	City of license/Market	Station	Channel	Old affiliation	New affiliation	Notes/Ref.
March 1	Portland, Oregon	KATU	2	Independent	ABC	
March 1	Portland, Oregon	KPTV	12	ABC	Independent	
March 16	San Luis Obispo, California	KVEC-TV	6	NBC (primary); ABC (secondary)	NBC (exclusive)	
March 16	Santa Barbara, California	KEYT-TV	3	NBC (primary); CBS (secondary)	ABC (primary); CBS (secondary)	

=== Station closures ===
Date	City of license/Market	Station	Channel	Affiliation	Sign-on date	Notes
March 2	Durango, Colorado	KJFL-TV	6	Independent	November 4, 1963	
July 1	Monroe, Louisiana	KTSE	13	NET	March 9, 1957	

== See also ==
- 1964 in television
- 1964 in film
- 1964 in the United States
- List of American films of 1964
