= 1925 in American television =

This is a list of American television-related events in 1925.

== Events ==
- June 13 – The American inventor Charles Francis Jenkins publicly demonstrated the synchronized transmission of silhouette pictures. In 1925, Jenkins used a Nipkow disk and transmitted the silhouette image of a toy windmill in motion, over a distance of 5 mi (8.0 km) (from a naval radio station in Maryland to his laboratory in Washington, D.C.), using a lensed disk scanner with a 48-line resolution.
- June 30 - The American inventor Charles Francis Jenkins was granted U.S. patent 1,544,156 (Transmitting Pictures over Wireless). He had filed for this patent on March 13, 1922.
- Specific date unknown –
  - The American inventor Vladimir Zworykin had worked on the development of an electronic camera tube since 1923, while working for Westinghouse Electric. In a 1925 demonstration of Zworykin's device, the image was dim, it had low contrast and poor definition, and it was stationary.
  - In 1923, Vladimir Zworykin had applied for a television patent in the United States. He summarized the resulting invention in two patent applications. The first, entitled "Television Systems", was filed on December 29, 1923. It was followed by a second application in 1925 of essentially the same content, but with minor changes and the addition of a Paget-type RGB raster screen for color transmission and reception.He was awarded a patent for the 1925 application in 1928.
