= 1971 in American television =

This is a list of American television-related events in 1971.

== Events ==
Date	Event	Ref.
January 1	During the evening's broadcast of The Tonight Show Starring Johnny Carson on NBC, cigarette advertisements were broadcast in the United States for the final time. This is due to the ban on cigarette advertisements passed into law a year earlier.	
January 12	CBS airs the first episode of All in the Family, with a disclaimer at the beginning of the program warning viewers about potentially offensive content. Within a year, it became television's most popular program, and started a trend toward realism in situation comedies.	
February 7	ABC affiliate WBKO (formerly WLTV) in Bowling Green, Kentucky activates its new transmission facility. This comes after operating with limited power in the aftermath of the WLTV transmitter sabotage by dynamite in September 1969.	
February 23	The documentary, The Selling of the Pentagon is broadcast on CBS.	
May	CBS releases its schedule for the Fall 1971 season, canceling all four of the network's rural-oriented series, including Green Acres, The Beverly Hillbillies, Mayberry R.F.D., and Hee Haw, the latter of which continued to be in production for first-run syndication for an additional 21 years. This action was also known as the “rural purge”.	
August 1 – September 5	CBS airs the acclaimed 6-hour BBC miniseries The Six Wives of Henry VIII, starring Keith Michell, in six separate installments, airing on six consecutive Sundays.	
September 12	KVUE signs-on the air, giving the Austin market its first full-time ABC affiliate. It takes both KTBC-TV and KXAN-TV's secondary ABC affiliations, leaving KTBC-TV as a full-time CBS affiliate, and KHFI-TV as a NBC affiliate.	
September 13	U.S. network prime time programming shrinks as the original Prime Time Access Rule takes effect. NBC, unable to take advantage, immediately feels the pinch and fails to win any of the 1971–72 season's first thirteen weeks in terms of the Nielsen ratings.	
November	A 12-year streak in the ratings for the CBS soap opera As the World Turns' ends as that program lost the #1 slot for the first time since 1959.	
December 23	NBC airs the 1964 Christmas special, Rudolph the Red-Nosed Reindeer, for the final time (in this case, KUAM-TV in Guam), as CBS picked up the rights for that special beginning the following year. The special would return to NBC in 2024.	

== Television programs ==
=== Debuts ===
Date	Debut	Network
January 10	Masterpiece Theatre	PBS
January 12	All in the Family	CBS
August 1	Comedy Playhouse	CBS
August 1	The Sonny & Cher Comedy Hour	CBS
September 11	The Funky Phantom	ABC
September 11	Help! It's the Hair Bear Bunch	CBS
September 11	The Pebbles and Bamm-Bamm Show	CBS
September 11	The Jackson 5ive	ABC
September 11	Lidsville	ABC
September 11	Sabrina, the Teenage Witch	CBS
September 17	McMillan & Wife	NBC
September 17	O'Hara, U.S. Treasury	CBS
September 18	The New Dick Van Dyke Show	CBS
October 25	The Electric Company	PBS

=== Programs changing network affiliation ===
Show	Moved from	Moved to
Hee Haw	CBS	Syndication
Lassie	CBS	Syndication
Let's Make a Deal	ABC	Syndication
The Lawrence Welk Show	ABC	Syndication
The Road Runner Show	ABC	CBS

=== Ending this year ===
Date	Show	Network	Debut
January 1	Headmaster	CBS	1970
January 7	Nancy	NBC	1970
February 24	To Rome with Love	CBS	1969
March 4	Family Affair	CBS	1966
March 19	That Girl	ABC	1966
March 19	The Name of the Game	NBC	1968
March 23	Julia	NBC	1968
March 23	The Beverly Hillbillies	CBS	1962
March 28	Hogan's Heroes	CBS	1965
March 29	Mayberry R.F.D.	CBS	1968
March 31	The Johnny Cash Show	ABC	1969
April 2	Dark Shadows	ABC	1966
April 27	Green Acres	CBS	1965
May 5	The Johnny Cash Show	ABC	1969
June 6	The Ed Sullivan Show	CBS	1948
June 25	A World Apart	ABC	1970
August 1	The Red Skelton Show	NBC	1951
September 5	The Banana Splits Adventure Hour (Returned in 2008 as The Banana Splits Reboot)	NBC	1968
September 5	Comedy Playhouse	CBS	1971
October 22	What's New	PBS	1959 (on NET)
Unknown date	NBC Experiment in Television	NBC	1971

== Networks and services ==
=== Network launches ===
Network	Type	Launch date	Notes	Source
New Jersey Network	Over-the-air state network	April 5	The PBS affiliated state network serving New Jersey, eastern Pennsylvania and the New York City area.	

== Television stations ==
=== Sign-ons ===
Date	City of License/Market	Station	Channel	Affiliation	Notes/Ref.
January 25	Indianapolis, Indiana	WHMB-TV	40	Religious independent	
February	South Bend, Indiana	WNIT	34	PBS	
February 3	Pueblo, Colorado	KTSC	8	PBS	
February 28	Louisville, Kentucky	WDRB	41	Independent	Now a Fox network affiliate.
April 5	Trenton, New Jersey	WNJT	52	PBS	Flagship of the New Jersey Network
April 7	Gainesville, Florida	WCJB-TV	20	NBC	
April 11	Baltimore, Maryland	WBFF-TV	45	Independent	Now a Fox network affiliate.
May 31	Paducah, Kentucky	WDXR-TV	29	Independent	Became a satellite station of the Kentucky Educational Television network in 1979.
June 4	Wilmington, North Carolina	WUNJ-TV	39	PBS/UNC-TV	
June 6	Atlanta, Georgia	WHAE-TV	46	Independent	now a CBS affiliate
June 27	Peoria, Illinois	WTVP	47	PBS	
July 4	Mississippi State/Starkville, Mississippi	WMAB-TV	2	PBS/MSETV	
July 7	Pocatello/Idaho Falls, Idaho	KBGL-TV	10	PBS	Part of Idaho Public Television
July 24	Battle Creek, Michigan	WUHQ-TV	41	ABC	
July 28	Fort Smith, Arkansas	KFPW-TV	40	CBS	
August 3	Lebanon, New Hampshire	WRLH	31	NBC	Returned to the air after an almost three-year hiatus
August 9	Watertown, New York	WNPE-TV	16	PBS	
August 15	Houston, Texas	KVRL	26	Independent	
August 23	Traverse City, Michigan	WGTU	29	ABC	
September 5	Norwood, New York	WNPI-TV	18	PBS	Satellite of WNPE-TV/Watertown
September 12	Austin, Texas	KVUE	24	ABC	
September 26	Springfield, Massachusetts	WGBY-TV	57	PBS	
October 11	Visalia/Fresno, California	KMPH-TV	26	Independent	
October 16	Baton Rouge, Louisiana	WRBT	33	ABC	
October 23	Sarasota, Florida	WXLT-TV	40	ABC	
October 31	Muncie, Indiana	WIPB	49	PBS	
December	Rochester, Minnesota	KAVT-TV	15	PBS	
December 5	Columbia, Missouri	KCBJ-TV	17	ABC	
December 21	Fairbanks, Alaska	KUAC-TV	9	PBS	
December 31	Boise, Idaho	KAID	4	PBS	Part of Idaho Public Television
Unknown date	Indianapolis, Indiana	WURD	44	Religious independent	
Unknown date	Toledo, Ohio	ToledoVision5	5 (cable-only)	Independent	

=== Network affiliation changes ===
Date	City of license/Market	Station	Channel	Old affiliation	New affiliation	Notes/Ref.
July 24	Cadillac-Traverse City, Michigan	WWTV	9	CBS (primary); ABC (secondary)	CBS (exclusive)	
July 24	Sault Ste. Marie, Michigan	WWUP-TV	10	CBS (primary); ABC (secondary)	CBS (exclusive)	
October	Anchorage, Alaska	KENI-TV	2	ABC	NBC	
October	Anchorage, Alaska	KYUR	13	NBC	ABC	
December 5	Columbia, Missouri	KRCG	13	CBS (primary); ABC (secondary)	CBS (exclusive)	
December 5	Warrensburg/Sedalia, Missouri	KMOS-TV	6	CBS (primary); ABC (secondary)	CBS (exclusive)	At the time of this change, KMOS (now a PBS member station) was a satellite of KRCG.

=== Station closures ===
Date	City of license/Market	Station	Channel	Affiliation	Sign-on date	Notes
March 16	Midland, Texas	KDCD-TV	18	Independent	December 19, 1961 (first incarnation); January 15, 1968 (second incarnation)	
April 15	San Francisco, California	KUDO	38	Independent	December 28, 1968	Returned to the air as KVOF-TV on October 4, 1974.
September 15	Jacksonville, Illinois	WJJY-TV	14	ABC	August 18, 1969	
Unknown date	Muncie, Indiana	WLBC-TV	49	NBC (primary); ABC (secondary)	June 14, 1953	Returned to the air October 31 as PBS member station WIPB

== See also ==
- 1971 in television
- 1971 in film
- 1971 in the United States
- List of American films of 1971
