= Gil Fates =

American television producer (1914–2000)

Joseph Gilbert Fates (September 29, 1914 - May 1, 2000) was an American television producer.

== Early years ==
Fates was a native of Newark, New Jersey, who studied economics at the University of Virginia. In the summer after he graduated he was an actor at the Barter Theatre in Virginia.

== Career ==
Fates went from the Barter Theatre to New York. Broadway productions in which he performed included The Hill Between (1938), Where Do We Go From Here? (1938), The American Way (1939), and Stop Press (1939). He acted in the road company of Stage Door and was stage manager for the touring company of The Man Who Came to Dinner. In May 1941, he was hired as the first television stage manager at CBS. He also was host of CBS Television Quiz, TV's first regularly scheduled game show, which debuted on July 2, 1941.

Fates left the network for four years' military service in World War II, serving in the United States Coast Guard. His military duties included commanding a rescue cutter in the English Channel while allied forces invaded Normandy. He returned to CBS in the dual roles of producer and master of ceremonies. His commentaries accompanied "everything from the circus to dog shows, basketball games, elections, and the Easter parade." In 1952, he went to work for Mark Goodson–Bill Todman Productions.

Fates was the executive producer of What's My Line? Fates produced the game show during its entire quarter-century span of CBS and syndicated runs. Fates and panelist Arlene Francis (who debuted on the second week) were with the show from 1950 until it ended in 1975. Fates also hosted CBS Television Quiz, the first television game show ever to be broadcast regularly; and was credited as a creative consultant on Play Your Cards Right, the British version of Goodson-Todman's Card Sharks. Before World War II, he was a stage actor. He also wrote a book in 1978 called What's My Line? The Inside Story of America's Most Famous Panel Show.

From 1973 to 1975 Fates's name was invoked by host Larry Blyden on every episode of What's My Line? As Blyden explained before introducing mystery guest Paul Lynde: "It's time to tell the audience and the members of the panel, especially those watching the program over the last 22 years, about a new development known as Fates' Law. Fates' Law is that any member who guesses who the mystery guest is and is wrong is then out. That's Fates' Law." Fates himself explained that the rule was named by Blyden but actually inspired by panelist Soupy Sales: "Soupy knows everybody in show business. He could identify even the most obscure comic or nightclub singer despite the most bizarre vocal disguise... [the new rule] cut down a bit on the number of instant solutions, not only from Soupy but also from other panelists who had a tendency to guess."

== Personal life and death ==
Fates and his wife, Faye, had a son and two daughters. At the time of his death, Fates lived in Greenwich, Connecticut. He died on May 1, 2000, at Beth Israel Medical Center in Manhattan, aged 86.
