= 1947 in American television =

This is a list of American television-related events in 1947.

== Events ==
Date	Event	Notes/Ref.
January 1	KTLA broadcasts the Tournament of Roses Parade for the first time ever.	
January 3	For the first time ever, the proceedings of the United States Congress were televised.	
January 29	The Radio Corporation of America (RCA) demonstrates an all-electronic color television system using live images, to the Federal Communications Commission (FCC).	
January 30	CBS's color television system is rejected by the FCC.	
February 27	The world's first-ever on-the-spot news coverage is broadcast by KTLA from a Pico Boulevard electroplating plant explosion.	
March 11	The first successful American children's television series, Movies for Small Fry debuts on the DuMont Television Network.	
July 16	RCA demonstrates the world's first all-electronic color camera to the Federal Communications Commission. (Only television receivers were present at the demonstration on January 29; the camera was at a remote studio.)	
September 30	The opening game of the World Series is the first World Series game to be telecast. The 1947 World Series was watched by an estimated 3.9 million people (many watching in bars and other public places). This marked television's first mass audience.	
October 5	The first telecast of a presidential address from the White House. President Harry S. Truman speaks about the world food crisis. It is preceded by a Jell-O commercial, and features the president discussing his program for food rationing. The address was televised by WTVW-TV (present-day WJLA-TV Channel 7 in Washington DC) as part of its inaugural broadcast. It was also simulcast by radio. It was long believed that no copy of this broadcast existed, but segments are preserved on kinescope in the Library of Congress. (For the record, President Franklin Roosevelt's address broadcast over NBC experimental television W2XBS—now WNBC—at the 1939 New York World's Fair—preceded the 1947 Truman broadcast. However, Truman's broadcast is indeed the first from inside the White House.)	
October 13	The puppet show series Junior Jamboree, later known as Kukla, Fran and Ollie, premieres on WBKB (now WBBM-TV) in Chicago, Illinois.	
November 6	Meet the Press first appears as a local program in Washington, D.C.	

== Television programs ==
=== Debuts ===
Date	Debut	Network
March 11	Small Fry Club	DuMont
April 3	Juvenile Jury	NBC
May 7	Kraft Television Theatre	NBC
October 13	Kukla, Fran and Ollie	WBKB
November 6	Meet the Press	NBC
November 13	Pantomime Quiz	KTLA
November 18	Mary Kay and Johnny	DuMont
December 8	Americana	NBC
December 27	Howdy Doody	NBC

== Television stations ==
=== Station launches ===
Date	Market	Station	Channel	Affiliation	Notes/Ref.
January 3	Washington, D.C.	WTTG	5	DuMont	Now a Fox network O&O since 1986.
January 22	Los Angeles, California	KTLA	4 (now 5)	DuMont	First commercial television station west of the Mississippi River; now a CW O&O station.
February 8	St. Louis, Missouri	KSD-TV	5	NBC (primary); DuMont (secondary)	Now KSDK. Longest-tenured affiliate of NBC, or any network, among non-O&Os
March 4	Detroit, Michigan	WWJ-TV	4	NBC (primary); DuMont (secondary)	Now WDIV-TV, the WWJ-TV calls now reside at CBS' O&O in Detroit
June 27	Washington, D.C.	WNBW	4	NBC (O&O)	Now WRC-TV
September 13	Philadelphia, Pennsylvania	WFIL-TV	6	DuMont	Now ABC O&O station WPVI-TV
October 3	Washington, D.C.	WTVW (later WMAL-TV)	7	CBS	Now ABC affiliate WJLA-TV
October 27	Baltimore, Maryland	WMAR-TV	2	Independent	Now an ABC affiliate since October 1995
December 3	Milwaukee, Wisconsin	WTMJ-TV	3 (now on 4)	NBC (primary); CBS and ABC (secondary)	
December 17	Cleveland, Ohio	WEWS-TV	5	CBS	Now an ABC affiliate
