= 1944 in American television =

This is a list of American television-related events in 1944.

== Events ==
- On April 10, 1944, WNBT began feeding The Voice of Firestone Televues each week to a small network of stations including General Electric's Schenectady station (now called WRGB) and Philco-owned WPTZ (now KYW-TV) in Philadelphia, both of which are now affiliated with CBS (in KYW-TV's case, they are owned by CBS). This series is considered to be the NBC Television Network's first regularly scheduled program.

== Television programs ==
=== Debuts ===
Date	Debut	Network
Uncertain	At Home	WCBW
June or July	Will You Remember?	WCBW
August 3	Missus Goes a Shopping	CBS Television
December 22	The World in Your Home	WNBT
