= 1974 in American television =

This is a list of American television-related events in 1974.

== Events ==
Date	Event	Ref.
January 31	CBS broadcasts The Autobiography of Miss Jane Pittman, a multi-Emmy-winning adaptation of Ernest J. Gaines’ novel of the same name which follows the 110-year life of a former slave from the American Civil War to the Civil Rights Movement. Cicely Tyson is tapped to play the title role.	
February 1	KITC-TV signs-on the air, giving the Boise market its first full-time ABC affiliate.	
February 8	After 20 years and 5,195 episodes, The Secret Storm ends its run on CBS’s daytime schedule. Ten days later, the show is replaced by Tattletales, a Bert Convy-hosted game show that is devoted to celebrity gossip.	
March 11	The children's special Free to Be... You and Me, produced by comedic actress Marlo Thomas, airs on ABC.	
March 13	The Execution of Private Slovik, a made-for-TV film telling the story of Pvt. Eddie Slovik, the only American soldier to be executed for desertion after the American Civil War, airs on NBC.	
March 18	CBS's cancellation of Here's Lucy marks the end of the television reign of Lucille Ball, which lasted 23 consecutive years beginning with the 1951 premiere of I Love Lucy.	
April 5	The Dean Martin Show ends its run on NBC after 264 hour-long episodes. NBC will continue to air periodic editions of The Dean Martin Celebrity Roast over the next 10 years.	
April 26	KPVI signs-on the air, giving the Idaho Falls market its first full-time ABC affiliate.	
April 29	Chuck Scarborough joins WNBC-TV and revamps its format as NewsCenter 4, signaling the debut of the NewsCenter format.	
July 15	Christine Chubbuck, a television reporter for WXLT in Sarasota, Florida commits suicide via a gunshot from behind her right ear during a live newscast on Suncoast Digest.	
August 8	U.S. President Richard Nixon announces his pending resignation live on television, effective at 12 Noon EDT the next day, at which time Vice President Gerald Ford is sworn in as President.	
August 21	WEVU (now WZVN-TV) signs-on the air, giving the Fort Myers market its first full-time ABC affiliate.	
August 25	Al Ham's music theme Part of Your Life made its debut on WBTV-TV in Charlotte.	
September 10	Born Innocent, a controversial film starring Linda Blair, airs on NBC. The film, which involved a fourteen-year-old being sent to what the television preview deemed a women's prison (when in reality it was a reform school), drew heavy criticism due to an all-female rape scene, the first ever seen on American television. The scene was deleted in subsequent re-airings after a group of girls assaulted an eight-year-old with a pop bottle, influenced by the scene in the film.	
October 6	Monty Python's Flying Circus, the British sketch comedy series that aired its final episode this year, is first shown on American television when PBS member station KERA-TV in Dallas, Texas airs it at 10 p.m. Central Daylight Time.	
November 28	For the fourth time this year, ABC aligns with a new station as WOPC-TV in Altoona, Pennsylvania brings full-time ABC service to the Altoona-State College market. WOPC-TV struggles for viewers and goes dark in 1982; ABC would return to Altoona (and channel 23) in 1988 when Fox affiliate WWPC-TV (then a satellite of WWCP-TV in Johnstown) breaks from its simulcast with WWCP-TV.	

=== Other notable events ===
- On the CBS soap opera Love of Life, Meg Dale (Tudi Wiggins) calls her son Ben Harper (Christopher Reeve) a "bastard", marking the first time that a swear word is spoken on American daytime television.

== Television stations ==
=== Sign-ons ===
Date	City of License/Market	Station	Channel	Affiliation	Notes/Ref.
February	South Bend/Elkhart, Indiana	WNIT	34	PBS	
February 1	Nampa/Boise, Idaho	KITC	6	ABC	
March 31	Orlando, Florida	WOFL	35	Independent	
April 26	Pocatello, Idaho	KPVI	6	ABC	
May 5	Los Angeles, California	KVST-TV	68	Non-commercial independent	
July 25	South Bend, Indiana	WMSH-TV	46	Independent	
August 8	Naples/Fort Myers, Florida	WEVU	26	ABC	
August 11	Booneville, Mississippi	WMAE-TV	12	PBS	Part of MSETV
September 9	Grand Forks, North Dakota	KGFE	2	PBS	Part of Prairie Public Television
September 29	New York City	WBTB-TV	68	Independent	
October 5	Hagerstown, Maryland	WWPB	31	PBS	Part of Maryland Public Television
October 5	Sacramento, California	KMUV-TV	31	Independent	now a CW owned-and-operated station
November 28	Johnstown, Pennsylvania	WOPC	38	ABC	Now WATM-TV on channel 23
December 1	New Haven, Connecticut	WEDY	65	PBS	Part of the Connecticut Public Television network
December 15	Waterloo/Cedar Rapids, Iowa	KRIN	32	PBS	Part of Iowa Public Television

=== Network affiliation changes ===
Date	City of license/Market	Station	Channel	Old affiliation	New affiliation	Notes/Ref.
August 5	Bakersfield, California	KJTV	17	ABC	CBS	
October 6	Monroe, Louisiana	KNOE-TV	8	CBS (primary); NBC (secondary)	CBS (exclusive)	
October 6	West Monroe/Monroe, Louisiana	KLAA	14	Independent	NBC	Was temporarily off the air from 1971 to 1974
Unknown date	Augusta, Georgia	WJBF-TV	6	ABC (primary); NBC (secondary)	ABC (exclusive)	
Unknown date	Augusta, Georgia	WRDW-TV	12	CBS (primary); NBC (secondary)	CBS (exclusive)	

=== Station closures ===
Date	City of license/Market	Station	Channel	Affiliation	Sign-on date	Notes
March 28	Lebanon, New Hampshire	WRLH	31	NBC	September 10, 1966; had been silent from 1968 to August 3, 1971	
April 30	Roanoke, Virginia	WRFT-TV	27	ABC	March 4, 1966	Returned to air September 7, 1974 – February 11, 1975, as WRLU
Unknown date	Chicago, Illinois	WXXW	20	PBS	September 20, 1965	Would return to the air in February 1983 as WYCC

== Television shows ==
=== Debuting this year ===
Date	Show	Network
January 7	How to Survive a Marriage	NBC
January 7	Jackpot!	NBC
January 15	Happy Days	ABC
January 17	Chopper One	ABC
January 17	Firehouse	ABC
February 1	Good Times	CBS
February 4	Who Killed Lamb?	ABC
February 6	The Cowboys	ABC
February 10	Apple's Way	CBS
February 18	Tattletales	CBS
March 3	Nova	PBS
March 13	The Letter People	PBS
May 6	The $10,000 Pyramid	ABC
July 1	High Rollers	NBC
July 1	Winning Streak	NBC
July 4	Bicentennial Minute	CBS
July 29	Name That Tune	NBC
August 8	Just for Laughs	ABC
September 4	That's My Mama	ABC
September 7	Run, Joe, Run	NBC
September 7	Land of the Lost	NBC
September 7	Wheelie and the Chopper Bunch	NBC
September 7	Valley of the Dinosaurs	CBS
September 7	Shazam!	CBS
September 7	The Harlem Globetrotters Popcorn Machine	CBS
September 7	The Hudson Brothers Razzle Dazzle Show	CBS
September 7	Partridge Family 2200 A.D.	CBS
September 7	The U.S. of Archie	CBS
September 7	Hong Kong Phooey	ABC
September 7	Devlin	ABC
September 7	Korg: 70,000 B.C.	ABC
September 7	The New Adventures of Gilligan	ABC
September 7	These Are the Days	ABC
September 9	Rhoda	CBS
September 9	Dinah!	Syndication
September 9	The $25,000 Pyramid	Syndication
September 11	Get Christie Love!	ABC
September 11	Petrocelli	NBC
September 11	Little House on the Prairie	NBC
September 12	Harry O	ABC
September 12	Movin' On	NBC
September 12	Paper Moon	ABC
September 13	Chico and the Man	NBC
September 13	The Rockford Files	NBC
September 13	Police Woman	NBC
September 13	The Texas Wheelers	ABC
September 13	Kolchak: The Night Stalker	ABC
September 13	Kodiak	ABC
September 13	Planet of the Apes	CBS
September 14	The New Land	ABC
September 14	Paul Sand in Friends and Lovers	CBS
September 21	Nakia	ABC
December 23	The Big Showdown	ABC
December 23	The Money Maze	ABC

=== Ending this year ===
Date	Show	Debut
January 2	Love Story	1973
January 4	Return to Peyton Place	1972
January 4	The Who, What, or Where Game	1969
January 5	Griff	1973
January 11	Love, American Style	1969
January 11	Room 222	1969
February 8	The Secret Storm	1954
March 8	The Brady Bunch	1969
March 11	The New Dick Van Dyke Show	1971
March 15	Lotsa Luck	1973
March 18	Here's Lucy	1968
March 23	The Partridge Family	1970
March 24	The Dean Martin Show	1965
March 29	Baffle	1973
April 6	Owen Marshall, Counselor at Law	1971
April 11	Chopper One	1974
April 11	Firehouse	1974
April 28	The F.B.I.	1965
May 1	Doc Elliot	1973
May 8	The Cowboys	1974
May 10	Toma	1973
May 29	The Sonny & Cher Comedy Hour	1971
June 27	The Flip Wilson Show	1970
June 28	The Wizard of Odds	1973
June 28	Three on a Match	1971
July 26	Dinah's Place	1970
August 29	Just for Laughs	1974
August 29	Temperatures Rising	1972
October 4	The Texas Wheelers	1974
October 12	Star Trek: The Animated Series	1973
October 18	Kodiak	1974
October 19	The New Land	1974
November 30	Wheelie and the Chopper Bunch	1974
December 19	Paper Moon	1974
December 20	Planet of the Apes	1974
December 20	The Newlywed Game	1966
December 20	The Girl in My Life	1973
December 21	Devlin	1974
December 21	Hong Kong Phooey	1974
December 21	Partridge Family 2200 A.D.	1974
December 21	The U.S. of Archie	1974
December 21	Valley of the Dinosaurs	1974
December 28	Nakia	1974

== See also ==
- 1974 in television
- 1974 in film
- 1974 in the United States
- List of American films of 1974
