= 1963 in American television =

This is a list of American television-related events in 1963.

== Events ==
Date	Event	Ref.
May 15	NBC carries the first transmission from "Faith 7", a U.S. crewed space capsule. It was broadcast on tape delay due to poor picture quality.	
September 2	The CBS Evening News becomes the first half-hour weeknight news broadcast in American network television when the show was lengthened from 15 to 30 minutes. NBC's evening news program, The Huntley-Brinkley Report, follows suit one week later.	
October 1	ABC News begins to rely on its own camera crews, after depending on outside sources for news film.	
November 22	Regular programming of all three major U.S. networks start pre-emptions for four days following the news of John F. Kennedy's assassination. The most notable preserved recording of the wall-to-wall news coverage of the assassination was that of CBS, when CBS News interrupts that day's episode of As the World Turns. Through the facilities of the Relay 1 satellite, the news bulletins about the assassination, as well as the funeral procession later that week, were the first television broadcasts across the Pacific Ocean.	
December 7	Instant replay, the brainchild of CBS Sports director Tony Verna makes its debut during CBS's live broadcast of the Army–Navy Game. Following a series of improvements, instant replay goes on to become a vital part of televised sports coverage around the world. It is often credited as a primary factor in the rise of televised American football.	

=== Other television events in 1963 ===
- The Federal Communications Commission approves authorization of television remote controls to be included with each manufactured television set.
- For the first time, most Americans say that they get more of their news from television than newspapers.

== Television programs ==
=== Debuts ===
Date	Debut	Network
January 1	Fractured Flickers	Syndication
January 6	Mutual of Omaha's Wild Kingdom	NBC
January 7	The Dakotas	ABC
April 1	The Doctors	NBC
April 1	General Hospital	ABC
April 1	You Don't Say!	NBC
April	Hootenanny	ABC
July 22	Vacation Playhouse	CBS
September 14	The Lieutenant	NBC
September 15	Arrest and Trial	ABC
September 15	Grindl	NBC
September 16	Breaking Point	ABC
September 16	The Outer Limits	ABC
September 17	The Fugitive	ABC
September 17	The Greatest Show on Earth	ABC
September 18	Channing	ABC
September 18	The Patty Duke Show	ABC
September 19	The Jimmy Dean Show	ABC
September 19	Temple Houston	NBC
September 20	Burke's Law	ABC
September 20	The Farmer's Daughter	ABC
September 21	The Funny Company	Syndication
September 21	The Jerry Lewis Show	ABC
September 22	The Bill Dana Show	NBC
September 23	East Side West Side	CBS
September 24	Mr. Novak	NBC
September 24	Petticoat Junction	CBS
September 24	The Richard Boone Show	NBC
September 25	The Danny Kaye Show	CBS
September 25	Glynis	CBS
September 27	The Great Adventure	CBS
September 28	The New Phil Silvers Show	CBS
September 28	Tennessee Tuxedo and His Tales	CBS
September 29	The Judy Garland Show	CBS
September 29	My Favorite Martian	CBS
September 29	The Travels of Jaimie McPheeters	ABC
September 30	Hollywood and the Stars	NBC
October 2	Espionage	NBC
October 4	Bob Hope Presents the Chrysler Theatre	NBC
October 5	The New Casper Cartoon Show	ABC
October 10	Kraft Suspense Theatre	NBC
November 10	That Was the Week That Was	NBC
December 30	Let's Make a Deal	NBC
December 30	Mack & Myer for Hire	Syndication

=== Ending this year ===
Date	Show	Network	Debut	Notes
January 25	Don't Call Me Charlie!	NBC	September 21, 1962	
January 28	It's a Man's World	NBC	September 17, 1962	
February 4	Saints and Sinners	NBC	September 17, 1962	
March 18	The New Loretta Young Show	CBS	September 24, 1962	
March 23	Mr. Smith Goes to Washington	ABC	September 29, 1962	
March 25	The Jetsons	ABC	September 23, 1962	Returned in 1985.
March 30	Sam Benedict	NBC	September 15, 1962	
March 30	The Gallant Men	ABC	October 5, 1962	
April 2	Hawaiian Eye	ABC	October 1959	
April 8	The Rifleman	ABC	September 30, 1958	
April 14	Car 54, Where Are You?	NBC	September 1961	
April 20	Have Gun – Will Travel	CBS	September 14, 1957	
April 24	Going My Way	ABC	October 3, 1962	
April 25	Alcoa Premiere	ABC	October 10, 1961	
April 25	Wide Country	NBC	September 20, 1962	
April 30	The Dick Powell Show	NBC	September 26, 1961	
May 5	Ensign O'Toole	CBS	September 23, 1962	
May 11	I'm Dickens, He's Fenster	ABC	September 28, 1962	
May 12	The Dinah Shore Chevy Show	NBC	October 5, 1956	
May 13	The Dakotas	ABC	January 7, 1963	
May 14	Empire	NBC	September 25, 1962	
May 17	Our Man Higgins	ABC	October 3, 1962	
May 20	Stoney Burke	ABC	October 1, 1962	
May 21	Laramie	NBC	September 15, 1959	
May 21	The Untouchables	ABC	October 15, 1959	
May 21	The Voice of Firestone	NBC	September 1949	
May 21	The Lloyd Bridges Show	CBS	September 11, 1962	
May 26	GE True	CBS	September 30, 1962	
May 29	Naked City	ABC	September 30, 1958	
June 5	Armstrong Circle Theatre	NBC; CBS	June 6, 1950	
June 5	The Many Loves of Dobie Gillis	CBS	September 29, 1959	
June 16	McKeever and the Colonel	NBC	September 23, 1962	
June 20	Leave It to Beaver	ABC	October 4, 1957	Returned in 1983.
June 23	The Real McCoys	CBS	October 3, 1957	
July 7	Dennis the Menace	CBS	October 4, 1959	
August 26	Lippy the Lion and Hardy Har Har	Syndication	September 3, 1962	
August 26	Touché Turtle and Dum Dum	Syndication	September 3, 1962	
August 30	Wally Gator	Syndication	September 3, 1962	
September 1	Ripcord	Syndication	June 3, 1961	
September 19	Fair Exchange	CBS	September 21, 1962	
September 28	The Shari Lewis Show	NBC	October 1, 1960	Returned in 1968.
December 18	Glynis	CBS	September 25, 1963	
December 27	Who Do You Trust?	ABC	September 30, 1957	

== Television stations ==
=== Sign-ons ===
Date	City of License/Market	Station	Channel	Affiliation	Notes/Ref.
January 1	New Bedford, Massachusetts (Providence, Rhode Island)	WTEV	6	ABC	
January 29	Milwaukee, Wisconsin	WMVS	10	NET	
January 31	Philadelphia, Pennsylvania	WPCA-TV	17	Independent	Second incarnation
March 5	Washington, D.C.	WOOK-TV	14	Independent	
March 18	Columbus, Ohio	WGSF	28	NET	
July 15	Jonesboro, Arkansas	KAIT	8	Independent	
September 7	New Bern/Greenville/Washington, North Carolina	WNBE-TV	12	ABC	
September 15	Durango, Colorado	KREZ-TV	6	CBS	Satellite of KGGM-TV (now KRQE) in Albuquerque, New Mexico
September 17	Savannah, Georgia	WVAN-TV	9	NET	Part of the Georgia Public Broadcasting television network
September 23	Orono/Bangor, Maine	WMEB-TV	12	NET	Part of Maine Public Broadcasting Network
September 29	Greenville, South Carolina	WNTV	29	NET	Part of South Carolina ETV
October 14	High Point, North Carolina (Greensboro/Winston-Salem, NC)	WGHP	8	ABC	
November 2	Yuma, Arizona	KBLU-TV	13	CBS	
November 4	Durango, Colorado	KJFL-TV	6	Independent	
November 28	Huntsville, Alabama	WHNT	19	CBS	
December 28	Sterling, Colorado	KTVS	3	CBS	Satellite of KFBC (now KGWN-TV) of Cheyenne, Wyoming
Unknown date	Philadelphia, Pennsylvania	WUHY-TV	35	Educational independent	

=== Network affiliation changes ===
Date	City of license/Market	Station	Channel	Old affiliation	New affiliation	Notes/Ref.
August 1	Davenport, Iowa (Moline-Rock Island, IL/Bettendorf, Iowa)	WOC-TV	6	NBC (primary); ABC (secondary)	NBC (exclusive)	

=== Station closures ===
Date	City of license/Market	Station	Channel	Affiliation	Sign-on date	Notes
April 17	Hot Springs, Arkansas	KFOY-TV	9	NBC	February 1, 1961	
May 16	Charlotte, North Carolina	WUTV	36	ABC (primary); NBC/CBS (secondary)	September 5, 1961	
June	Philadelphia, Pennsylvania	WPCA-TV	17	Independent	July 10, 1960 (first incarnation); January 31, 1963 (second incarnation)	Financial distress; returned in 1965 as WPHL-TV
June 10	Ann Arbor, Michigan	WJMY	20	Independent	October 7, 1962	
July 15	Flagstaff, Arizona	KVLS	13	Independent	December 18, 1961	
