= 1940 in American television =

This is a list of American television-related events in 1940.

== Events ==
- January – The FCC has public hearings concerning television.
- January 12 - The first network telecast, a play entitled "Meet The Wife," is televised by NBC over W2XBS (NBC) and W2XB.
- February 25 – The first ice hockey game is televised in the United States, the New York Rangers vs Montreal Canadiens, from Madison Square Garden on W2XBS-TV.
- February 28 – The first basketball game is televised, from Madison Square Garden: Fordham University vs the University of Pittsburgh.
- Spring - The CBS staff engineer Peter Carl Goldmark devised a system for color television that CBS management hoped would leapfrog the network over NBC and its existing black-and-white RCA system. The CBS system "gave brilliant and stable colors", while NBC's was "crude and unstable but 'compatible'". Ultimately, the FCC rejected the CBS system, because it was incompatible with RCA's. CBS had already moved to secure many ultra high frequency (UHF), not very high frequency (VHF), and television licenses, leaving them flatfooted in the early television age. Shortly after ruling in favor of NBC, the FCC chairman Charles Denny resigned from the FCC to become vice president and general counsel of NBC
- March 10 – The Metropolitan Opera broadcast for the first time from NBC studios at Rockefeller Center an abridged performance of the first act of Pagliacci, along with excerpts from four other operas.
- March 15 – RCA reduces the price of television sets.
- May 21 – Bell Telephone Laboratories transmits a 441-line video signal, with a bandwidth of 2.7 MHz, by coaxial cable from New York to Philadelphia and back.
- June – W2XBS in New York (NBC) covers the Republican National Convention from Philadelphia, Pennsylvania for 33 hours, during a five-day period. The signal is transmitted via coaxial cable.
- August 1 – W2XBS goes out of commission from 1 August 1940 until the 27th of October 1940 while the transmitter is adjusted from 441-line picture to 525-line picture.
- August 29 – Peter Carl Goldmark of CBS announces his invention of a color television system.
- September 3 – CBS resumes its television transmissions with the first demonstration of high definition color TV, by W2XAB, transmitting from the Chrysler Building.
- November 5 - First televised Presidential election coverage is carried by W2XBS (NBC) and W2XWV (DuMont).

== Television programs ==
=== Debuts ===
Date	Debut	Network
February 3	Art for Your Sake	W2XBS
February 21	The Esso Television Reporter	W2XBS
July 8	Boxing from Jamaica Arena	W2XBS

== Sources ==
- Erik Barnouw (1966). A Tower in Babel: A History of Broadcasting in the United States to 1933. New York City: Oxford University Press. ISBN 978-0-19-500474-8.
- Laurence Bergreen (1980). Look Now, Pay Later: The Rise of Network Broadcasting. New York City: Doubleday and Co. p. 59. ISBN 978-0-451-61966-2.
