= 1962 in American television =

This is a list of American television-related events in 1962.

== Events ==
Date	Event	Ref.
January 1	The 1962 Rose Bowl game on NBC is the first coast-to-coast live color television broadcast of a college football game in the United States.	
January 1	NBC introduces the Laramie Peacock before the midnight showing of the day's episode of Laramie	
March 24	On Fight of the Week, ABC televises the Benny Paret vs. Emile Griffith III boxing match from Madison Square Garden in New York City. The fight ends when Paret falls unconscious at the hands of Griffith, which would lead to his death ten days later.	
April 16	Walter Cronkite succeeds Douglas Edwards as anchorman of the CBS Evening News; he would remain so for the next 19 years.	
September 25	The Spanish International Network begins operation as the first Spanish-language television network in the United States	
November 15	NBC-primary/CBS-secondary affiliate WLEX-TV in Lexington, Kentucky becomes the first UHF television station to broadcast in color.	

=== Also in 1962 ===
- The All-Channel Receiver Act of 1962 requires UHF (channels 14-83) tuners to be on all consumer television sets in addition to the VHF tuner.
- Zenith Electronics markets its first color television set, 21-inch round screen set.

== Television programs ==
=== Debuts ===
Date	Debut	Network
January 1	The Magic Door	WBBM-TV
January 2	Your First Impression	NBC
January 27	Room for One More	ABC
February	Biography	Syndication
February 20	The Beachcomber	Syndication
March 8	Oh! Those Bells	CBS
September 3	The Hanna-Barbera New Cartoon Series	Syndication
September 3	Lippy the Lion and Hardy Har Har	Syndication
September 3	Touché Turtle and Dum Dum	Syndication
September 3	Wally Gator	Syndication
September 11	The Lloyd Bridges Show	CBS
September 14	Family Classics	WGN-TV
September 15	Sam Benedict	NBC
September 17	It's a Man's World	NBC
September 17	Saints and Sinners	NBC
September 20	Wide Country	NBC
September 21	Don't Call Me Charlie!	NBC
September 21	Fair Exchange	CBS
September 23	Ensign O'Toole	NBC
September 23	The Jetsons	ABC
September 23	McKeever and the Colonel	NBC
September 24	The New Loretta Young Show	CBS
September 25	Empire	NBC
September 26	The Beverly Hillbillies	CBS
September 27	The Nurses	CBS
September 28	I'm Dickens, He's Fenster	ABC
September 29	Mr. Smith Goes to Washington	ABC
September 29	The Roy Rogers and Dale Evans Show	ABC
September 30	GE True	CBS
October 1	Discovery	ABC
October 1	The Lucy Show	CBS
October 1	Stoney Burke	ABC
October 1	The Tonight Show Starring Johnny Carson	NBC
October 2	Combat!	ABC
October 3	The Eleventh Hour	NBC
October 3	Going My Way	ABC
October 3	Our Man Higgins	ABC
October 5	The Gallant Men	ABC
October 11	McHale's Navy	ABC
December 31	Match Game	NBC

=== Ending this year ===
Date	Show	Network	Debut	Notes
January 1	The Dick Tracy Show	First-run syndication	January 1, 1961	
January 6	The Yogi Bear Show	First-run syndication	January 30, 1961	
March 1	The New Bob Cummings Show	CBS	October 5, 1961	
March 25	Bus Stop	ABC	October 1, 1961	
March 30	The Hathaways	ABC	October 6, 1961	
March 30	Tonight Starring Jack Paar	NBC	July 29, 1957	
April 1	Adventures in Paradise	ABC	October 5, 1959	
April 4	Straightaway	ABC	October 6, 1961	
April 5	Mrs. G. Goes to College	CBS	October 4, 1961	
April 8	Follow the Sun	ABC	September 17, 1961	
April 12	Margie	ABC	October 12, 1961	
April 18	Top Cat	ABC	September 27, 1961	
April 22	Maverick	ABC	September 22, 1957	
April 30	87th Precinct	NBC	September 25, 1961	
April 30	Bronco	ABC	September 23, 1958	
May 10	Outlaws	NBC	September 29, 1960	
May 15	Cain's Hundred	NBC	September 19, 1961	
May 18	The Detectives	NBC	October 16, 1959 (on ABC)	
May 23	Window on Main Street	CBS	October 2, 1961	
May 31	Oh! Those Bells	CBS	March 8, 1962	
June 2	Tales of Wells Fargo	NBC	March 18, 1957	
June 5	Ichabod and Me	CBS	September 26, 1961	
June 5	The New Breed	ABC	October 3, 1961	
June 8	Target: The Corruptors!	ABC	September 29, 1961	
June 9	Calvin and the Colonel	ABC	October 3, 1961	
June 13	The Bob Newhart Show	NBC	October 11, 1961	
June 24	Lawman	ABC	October 5, 1958	
June 26	The Everglades	Syndication	October 9, 1961	
July 28	Room for One More	ABC	January 27, 1962	
September 1	Checkmate	CBS	September 17, 1960	
September 6	Frontier Circus	CBS	October 5, 1961	
September 12	The Alvin Show	CBS	October 4, 1961	
September 17	Hennesey	CBS	September 28, 1959	
September 18	The Comedy Spot	CBS	June 28, 1960	
September 25	Bachelor Father	ABC	September 15, 1957 (on CBS)	
September 28	The Brighter Day	CBS	January 4, 1954	
November 13	The Beachcomber	Syndication	February 20, 1962	
December 22	The Roy Rogers and Dale Evans Show	ABC	September 29, 1962	
Unknown date	Alfred Hitchcock Presents	NBC	1955	
Unknown date	The Quick Draw McGraw Show	First-run syndication	September 28, 1959	

== Network launches ==
Network	Type	Launch date	Notes
Spanish International Network	Broadcast over-the-air	September 29	The first foreign-language television network to broadcast in the United States
Connecticut Public Television	Public broadcasting network	October 1	Beginning with the sign-on of WEDH in Hartford, Connecticut, the network would eventually expand to four stations over the next 12 years.
Mizlou Television Network	Ad-hoc syndication service	Unknown date	Mizlou programming was syndicated to several commercial television outlets, as well as CATV systems.

== Television stations ==
=== Station launches ===
Date	City of License/Market	Station	Channel	Affiliation	Notes/Ref.
January 2	Salina, Kansas	KSLN-TV	34	ABC	
February 8	San Angelo, Texas	KACB-TV	3	NBC	
March 15	Portland, Oregon	KATU	2	Independent	
March 26	Albany, New York	WMHT	17	NET	
May 17	Boston, Massachusetts	WXHR-TV	56	Independent	Experimental station
June 3	Bowling Green, Kentucky	WLTV	13	Independent	
July 4	Honolulu, Hawaii	KTRG	13	Independent	
June 15	Sault Ste. Marie, Michigan	WWUP-TV	10	CBS	Satellite of WWTV/Traverse City
September 7	Miami, Florida	WLRN	17	NET	
September 9	Syracuse, New York	WNYS-TV	9	ABC	
September 10	Nashville, Tennessee	WDCN-TV	2	NET	Reallocated to VHF channel 8 in 1973; now a PBS member station.
September 10	San Antonio, Texas	KLRN	9	NET	
September 11	San Bernardino/Los Angeles, California	KVCR-TV	24	NET	
September 15	Biloxi, Mississippi	WLOX-TV	13	ABC	
September 15	Rochester, New York	WOKR	13	ABC	
September 19	Lafayette, Louisiana	KATC	3	ABC	
September 24	Pullman, Washington	KWSC-TV	10	NET	
September 25	Los Angeles, California	KMEX-TV	34	Spanish International Network	
September 30	Reno, Nevada	KCRL-TV	4	NBC (primary); ABC (secondary)	
October 1	Hartford, Connecticut	WEDH	24	NET	Flagship of Connecticut Public Television
October 1	Nuevo Laredo, Tamaluipas, Mexico (Laredo, Texas, United States)	XEFE-TV	12	Spanish International Network	
October 7	Ann Arbor, Michigan	WJMY	20	Independent	
October 16	Lubbock, Texas	KTXT-TV	5	NET	
October 23	Charleston, South Carolina	WCIV	4	NBC	
November 1	Grand Rapids, Michigan	WZZM-TV	13	ABC	
November 1	Yakima, Washington	KYVE	47	NET	Now a satellite of KCTS-TV/Seattle
November 3	Marion, Indiana	WTAF-TV	31	Independent	Defunct as of March 14, 1969
November 19	Ogden, Utah	KOET	9	Educational Independent	
November 24	Binghamton, New York	WBJA-TV	34	ABC	
December 18	Montgomery, Alabama	WAIQ	26	NET	Part of the Alabama Public Television network
Unknown date	Los Angeles, California	KIIX	22	Independent	

=== Network affiliation changes ===
Date	City of license/Market	Station	Channel	Old affiliation	New affiliation	Notes/Ref.
August 1	Durham, North Carolina	WTVD	11	CBS (primary); ABC (secondary)	CBS (primary); NBC (secondary)	
August 1	Raleigh, North Carolina	WRAL-TV	5	NBC (primary); ABC (secondary)	ABC (exclusive)	

=== Station closures ===
Date	City of license/Market	Station	Channel	Affiliation	Sign-on date	Notes
February 16	Midland, Texas	KDCD-TV	18	December 9, 1961	Returned to the air on January 15, 1968	
February 28	Youngstown, Ohio	WXTV	45	Independent	November 15, 1960	
August 1	Philadelphia, Pennsylvania	WPCA-TV	17	Independent	July 10, 1960	Returned to the air January 31, 1963
August 26	Odgen, Utah	KVOG-TV	9	Independent	December 1, 1960	
November 17	Boston, Massachusetts	WTAO-TV	56	Independent	May 17, 1962	Experimental station
