= CBS Television Quiz =

American game show

- Genre: Game show
- Created by: Gil Fates
- Developed by: Gil Fates
- Presented by: Gil Fates with Frances Buss
- Country of origin: United States
- No. of episodes: 107

Production
- Executive producer: Gil Fates
- Producers: Gil Fates; Worthington Miner
- Production location: New York City, New York
- Running time: 60 minutes (1941); 55 minutes (January/April–May 1942); 50 minutes (February–March/June 1942-January 1943)

Original release
- Network: WCBW (CBS)
- Release: July 2, 1941 – January 7, 1943

CBS Television Quiz is an American game show, running from July 2, 1941, to January 7, 1943, on the CBS television station in New York, WCBW Channel 2 (the forerunner of WCBS-TV). It was the first game show to be broadcast regularly on television. It was an in-house production and broadcast in black-and-white. The host was Gil Fates, with Frances Buss as scorekeeper.

== Game play ==
The CBS Television Quiz followed an answer-and-question format: contestants were given a clue and were asked to provide a question that the clue would answer. Beyond this, little is known about the show's mechanics.

The game show Jeopardy! would later use a similar answer-and-question conceit. Jeopardy! is known to differ from the CBS Television Quiz in its use of lockout buzzers, which had not yet been invented in 1941 (the first game show to use them was 1946's Winner Take All). Whether Julann Wright Griffin, whom Merv Griffin credited with creating the concept, knew of the CBS Television Quiz remains an open question.

== Broadcast history ==
Televised game shows prior to the debut of CBS Television Quiz were "test episodes" for experimental purposes; one of these was Truth or Consequences (NBC Radio, July 1, 1941), while a show called Spelling Bee was broadcast (BBC, 1938). Quiz was the first regularly scheduled quiz program, but not the first to be sponsored, and aired on Wednesdays at 8:30 PM EST.

On October 2, the series moved to Thursdays, and on January 8 the show was reduced to 55 minutes for the network to present a five-minute news summary at 9:25 PM. Quiz moved to Mondays on February 2 and was now preceded by a civilian-defense program (later an American Red Cross program), which along with the news summary required the show itself to decrease to 50 minutes. The Red Cross program ended on March 30, allowing Quiz to re-expand to 55 minutes. After WCBW scaled back their programing at the end of May 1942 following a mandate several weeks earlier by the War Production Board to cease building television stations, Quiz moved to Thursdays and Fridays and was again reduced to 50 minutes.

The series ended on January 7, 1943, the day before WCBW temporarily shut down its studios and reverted to broadcasting only filmed material on an irregular basis until May 1944.

The series was not revived following the end of World War II in 1945. Fates would later produce and/or direct many Goodson-Todman game shows on the network (most notably What's My Line?), while Buss (later Frances Buss Buch) became CBS' first female director.

== Bibliography ==
- Christopher H. Sterling and John M. Kittross, Stay Tuned: A History of American Broadcasting (Wadsworth Publishing, 1998; third edition, Lawrence Erlbaum Associates, 2002) pages 165-168 ISBN 978-0-534-00514-6
- Alex McNeil, Total Television, (New York: Penguin Books, fourth edition, 1980) ISBN 0-14-024916-8
- Tim Brooks and Earle Marsh, The Complete Directory to Prime Time Network TV Shows, (New York: Ballantine Books, third edition, 1964) ISBN 0-345-31864-1
