= 343-line television system =

1930s analog standard-definition television resolution standard

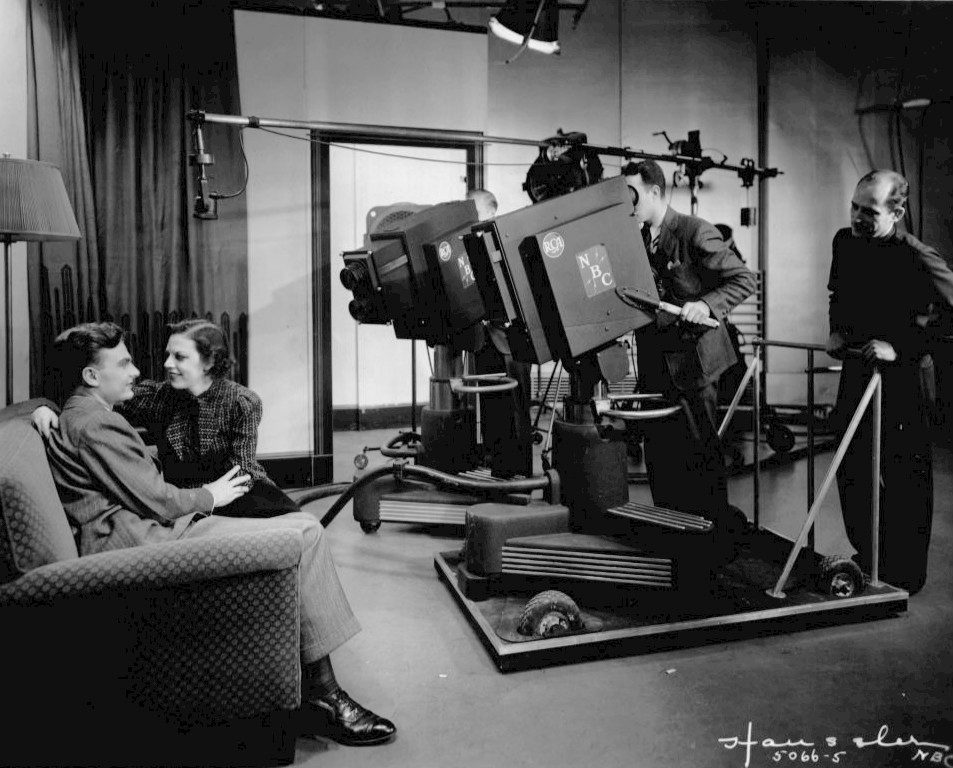
Iconoscope television cameras at NBC in 1937. Eddie Albert and Grace Brandt reprised their radio show, The Honeymooners-Grace and Eddie Show for television.

343-line is the number of scan lines in some early electronic monochrome analog television systems. Systems with this number of lines were used with 30 interlaced frames per second by the United States from 1935 to 1938, and with 25 interlaced frames per second in the Soviet Union from 1937 onwards. A similar system was under development in Poland in 1939.

TV cameras were based on the iconoscope, the primary camera tube used in American broadcasting from 1936 until 1946, when it was replaced by the image orthicon tube. Earlier cameras used special spotlights or spinning disks to capture light from a single very brightly lit spot, and were not suitable for broadcasting of outdoor live events.

This early standard was soon replaced by 441-line systems.

== United States ==
343-line broadcasts where introduced by RCA and NBC on November 6, 1936. Tests started the previous year from New York City (W2XF on the Empire State Building), where NBC converted a radio studio in the Rockefeller Center for television use.

Several prototype TV sets were produced by RCA in 1936, but none was available commercially. Broadcasts were limited to public demonstrations in New York City (RCA) and Philadelphia (Philco) - to be exact, Philco demonstrated a 345-line system, but in practice both systems were identical.

The 343-line system was proposed for FCC approval by the Radio Manufacturers Association (RMA) in December 1937. Broadcasts were phased out the following year, in favor of a 441-line system.

Technical details:

System	Lines	Frame rate	Field Frequency	Interlace	Channel bandwidth	Visual bandwidth	Sound offset	Vision mod.	Sound mod.	Aspect Ratio	Line frequency
343-line	343	30	60 Hz	2:1	6 MHz	3.29 MHz	3	Neg.	AM	4:3	10290 Hz

== Soviet Union ==
A a similar 343-line system was tested in the Soviet Union (Moscow) from 1937 onwards. RCA provided broadcast equipment and documentation for the TV sets, that were then produced locally. The system was adapted for 50 Hz mains electricity, with a field rate of 50 Hz. The first experimental transmissions happened on March 9, 1937, followed by regular broadcasts on December 31, 1938.

== Poland ==
In 1939, a 343-line system was under development in Poland, publicly demonstrated during the Warsaw Radio Exhibition on August. Regular operations were planned for the beginning of 1940, but work stopped due to the outbreak of World War II.
