= Image dissector =

Video camera tube

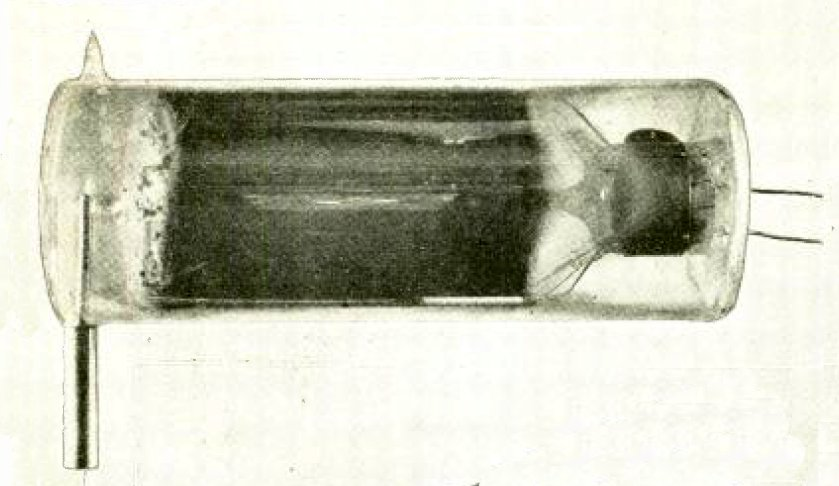
A Farnsworth image dissector tube

An image dissector, also called a dissector tube, is a video camera tube in which photocathode emissions create an electron image which is then swept up, down and across an anode to produce an electrical signal representing the visual image. It employs magnetic fields to keep the electron image in focus, and later models used an electron multiplier to pick up the electrons. The term had also been used for other kinds of early video camera tubes. Dissectors were used only briefly for research in television systems before being replaced by different much more sensitive tubes based on the charge-storage phenomenon like the iconoscope during the 1930s. Despite the camera tubes based on the idea of image dissector technology falling quickly and completely out of use in the field of Television broadcasting, they continued to be used for imaging in early weather satellites and the Lunar lander, and for star attitude tracking in the Space Shuttle and the International Space Station.

== Operation ==
An image dissector focuses a visual image onto a layer of photosensitive material, such as cesium oxide, which emits negatively charged photoelectrons proportional to the intensity of the light striking the material. Electrostatic deflecting plates or magnetic fields then periodically manipulate the resulting electron image horizontally and vertically before an electron multiplier, or a small aperture leading to a positively charged detector, or just an anode, in the case of the earliest dissector tubes. The electron multiplier or aperture permits only those electrons emanating from a very small area of the electron image, representing a similarly small area of the visual image. The entire image is scanned several times per second to produce an electrical signal that represented a moving visual image.

The early electronic camera tubes (like the image dissector) suffered from a very disappointing fatal flaw: They scanned the subject and what was seen at each point was only the tiny piece of light viewed at the instant that the scanning system passed over it.

Because the dissector does not store charge, it is useful for viewing the inside of furnaces and monitoring welding systems as it does not suffer from the flare normal picture tubes experience when looking at intense lights.

== History ==
In April 1925, German professor Max Dieckmann and his student Rudolf Hell applied for a patent for a device named Lichtelektrische Bildzerlegerröhre für Fernseher (Photoelectric Image Dissector Tube for Television) under the German patent number: DE450187C. A patent was issued in October 1927, and their experiments were announced in the American nationwide distributed magazines Discovery and Popular Radio, but they failed to reduce it to practice. In 1951, Hell claimed that he had made a tube but could not get it to function, since at the time there was an insufficient knowledge of electron optics, the manipulation of an electron beam by electric or magnetic fields.

American television pioneer Philo T. Farnsworth invented the first functional image dissector in 1927, submitting a patent application on January 7, 1927. On September 7 of that year, the image dissector successfully transmitted its first image, a simple straight line, at Farnsworth's laboratory at 202 Green Street in San Francisco. By September 3, 1928, Farnsworth had developed the system sufficiently to hold a demonstration for the press, the first such successful demonstration of a fully electronic television system.

In 1929 Farnsworth eliminated a motor generator from the system, so it then had no mechanical parts. Further developments that year included improvements in image clarity and an increase in the number of lines of resolution, such that it exceeded that of the mechanical television systems. Also in 1929, Farnsworth transmitted the first live human images with his system, including a three and a half-inch image of his wife Elma ("Pem") with her eyes closed (possibly due to the bright lighting required).

Since the electrons emitted within an image dissector are collected by the electron multiplier or anode only during the very brief time an area of the electron image is exposed, the bulk of the electrons are lost. Thus the earliest image dissectors were very inefficient, and extremely bright illumination was required for it to be used effectively. Farnsworth addressed this problem with the invention of an electron multiplier (not to be confused with contemporary electron multipliers), a device that increased the number of electrons in a circuit by generating secondary emissions of electrons from a pair of opposed surfaces, thus amplifying the electrical signal.

Farnsworth applied for a patent for his electron multiplier on March 3, 1930 and demonstrated its application in 1931. Farnsworth continued to improve the device, which would come to be called a multipactor, such that it reportedly could amplify a signal to the 60th power or better, and showed great promise in other fields of electronics. A significant problem with the multipactor, however, was that it wore out at an unsatisfactorily rapid rate.

On August 25, 1934, Farnsworth gave the world's first public demonstration of a complete, all-electronic television system, which included his image dissector, at the Franklin Institute in Philadelphia, Pennsylvania.

In April 1933, Farnsworth submitted a patent application entitled Image Dissector, but which actually detailed a charge storage low electron velocity cathode-ray tube (CRT) camera tube. Its principles were developed and implemented by RCA. Though RCA had paid royalties though in 1939, legal cost associated with RCA's patent dispute, war time manufacturing pressure, Farnsworths patent expiring just eight years later, and his understandable disillusionment his company would be dissolved shortly after world war two. The image dissector with its many pitfalls would rapidly be replaced through the 1930s by the image orthicon and iconoscopes, until the 1980s when they would also be replaced by solid state image sensors.

== See also ==
- Iconoscope
- Image Orthicon tube
