= Iconoscope =

Electronic television camera tube

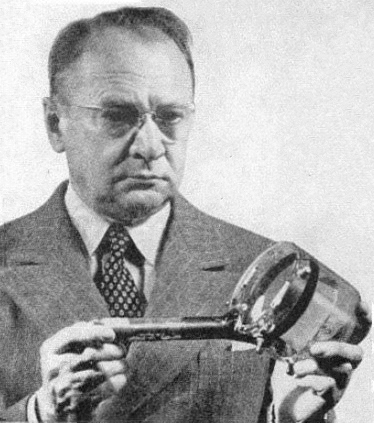
Zworykin holding the iconoscope tube, in a 1950 magazine article

The iconoscope (from the Greek: εἰκών "image" and σκοπεῖν "to look, to see") was the first practical video camera tube to be used in early television cameras. The iconoscope produced a much stronger signal than earlier mechanical designs and could be used under any well-lit conditions. This was the first fully electronic system to replace earlier cameras, which used special spotlights or spinning disks to capture light from a single very brightly lit spot.

Some of the principles of this apparatus were described when Vladimir Zworykin filed two patents for a television system in 1923 and 1925. A research group at Westinghouse Electric Company headed by Zworykin presented the iconoscope to the general public in a press conference in June 1933, and two detailed technical papers were published in September and October of the same year. The German company Telefunken bought the rights from RCA and built the superikonoskop camera used for the historical TV transmission at the 1936 Summer Olympics in Berlin.

The iconoscope was replaced in Europe around 1936 by the much more sensitive Super-Emitron and Superikonoskop, while in the United States the iconoscope was the leading camera tube used for broadcasting from 1936 until 1946, when it was replaced by the image orthicon tube.

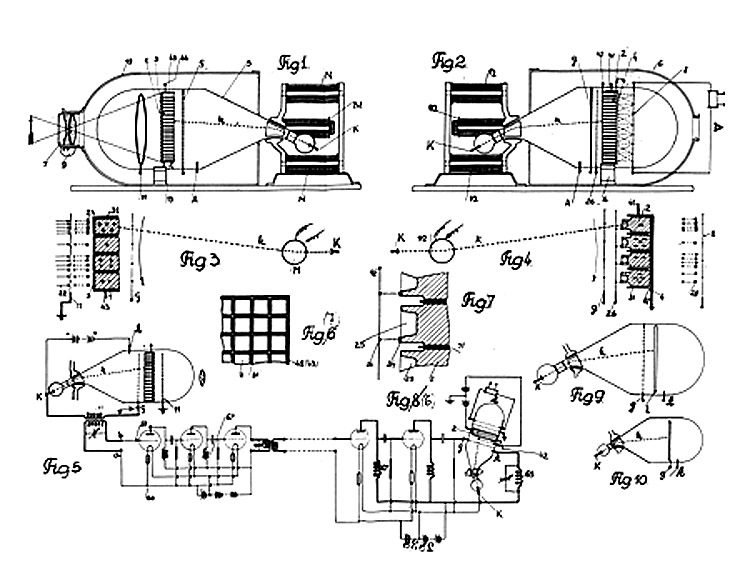
A graphic from Kálmán Tihanyi's "Radioskop" patent from 1926 (part of the UNESCO's Memory of the World Programme)

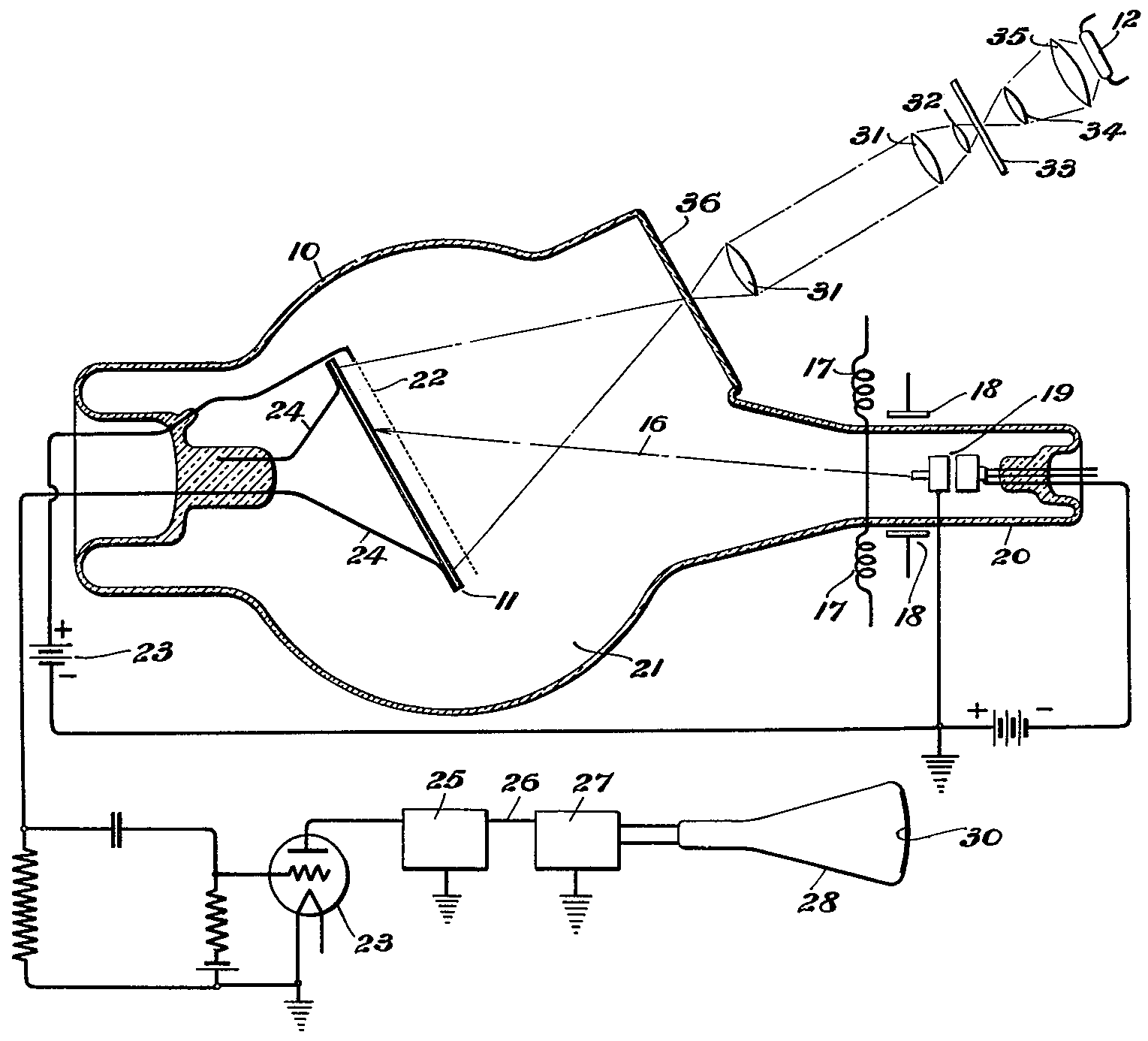
Zworykin's patent diagram of a UV-microscope 1931. The apparatus is similar to the iconoscope. The image entered through the series of lenses at upper right and hit the photoelectric cells on the image plate at left. The cathode ray at the right swept the image plate, charging it, and the photoelectric cells emitted an electric charge in variance with the amount of light hitting them. The resulting image signal was carried out the left side of the tube and amplified.

== Operation ==
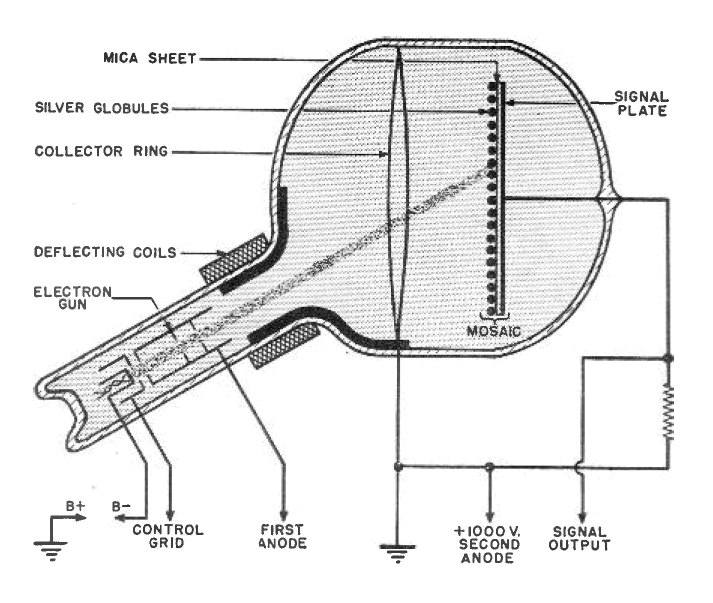
Diagram of iconoscope

The main image forming element in the iconoscope was a mica plate with a pattern of photosensitive granules deposited on the front using an electrically insulating glue. The granules were typically made of silver grains covered with caesium or caesium oxide. The back of the mica plate, opposite the granules, was covered with a thin film of silver. The separation between the silver on the back of the plate and the silver in the granules caused them to form individual capacitors, able to store electrical charge. These were typically deposited as small spots, creating pixels. The system as a whole was referred to as a "mosaic".

The system is first charged up by scanning the plate with an electron gun similar to one in a conventional television cathode ray display tube. This process deposits charges into the granules, which in a dark room would slowly decay away at a known rate. When exposed to light, the photosensitive coating releases electrons which are supplied by the charge stored in the silver. The emission rate increases in proportion to the intensity of the light. Through this process, the plate forms an electrical analog of the visual image, with the stored charge representing the inverse of the average brightness of the image at that location.

When the electron beam scans the plate again, any residual charge in the granules resists refilling by the beam. The beam energy is set so that any charge resisted by the granules is reflected back into the tube, where it is collected by the collector ring, a ring of metal placed around the screen. The charge collected by the collector ring varies in relation to the charge stored in that location. This signal is then amplified and inverted, and then represents a positive video signal.

The collector ring is also used to collect electrons being released from the granules in the photoemission process. If the gun is scanning a dark area few electrons would be released directly from the scanned granules, but the rest of the mosaic will also be releasing electrons that will be collected during that time. As a result, the black level of the image will float depending on the average brightness of the image, which caused the iconoscope to have a distinctive patchy visual style. This was normally combatted by keeping the image continually and very brightly lit. This also led to clear visual differences between scenes shot indoors and those shot outdoors in good lighting conditions.

As the electron gun and the image itself both have to be focused on the same side of the tube, some attention has to be paid to the mechanical arrangement of the components. Iconocopes were typically built with the mosaic inside a cylindrical tube with flat ends, with the plate positioned in front of one of the ends. A conventional movie camera lens was placed in front of the other end, focused on the plate. The electron gun was then placed below the lens, tilted so that it was also aimed at the plate, although at an angle. This arrangement has the advantage that both the lens and electron gun lie in front of the imaging plate, which allows the system to be compartmentalized in a box-shaped enclosure with the lens completely within the case.

As the electron gun is tilted compared to the screen, its image of the screen is not as a rectangular plate, but a keystone shape. Additionally, the time needed for the electrons to reach the upper portions of the screen was longer than the lower areas, which were closer to the gun. Electronics in the camera adjusted for this effect by slightly changing the scanning rates.

The accumulation and storage of photoelectric charges during each scanning cycle greatly increased the electrical output of the iconoscope relative to non-storage type image scanning devices. In the 1931 version, the electron beam scanned the granules; while in the 1925 version, the electron beam scanned the back of the image plate.

== History ==
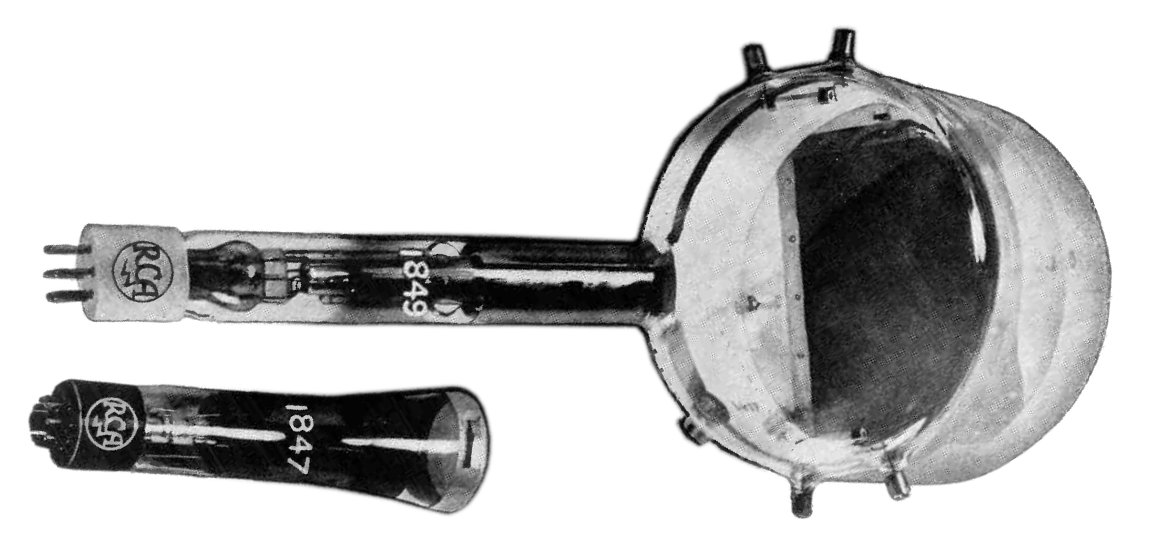
Two iconoscope tubes. The type 1849 (top) was the common tube used in studio television cameras. The camera's lens focused the image through the tube's transparent "window" (right) and onto the dark rectangular "target" surface visible inside. The type 1847 (bottom) was a smaller version.

The early electronic camera tubes (like the image dissector) suffered from a very disappointing fatal flaw: They scanned the subject and what was seen at each point was only the tiny piece of light viewed at the instant that the scanning system passed over it. A practical functional camera tube needed a different technological approach, which later became known as Charge – Storage camera tube. It was based on a new, hitherto unknown physical phenomenon which was discovered and patented by physicist Kálmán Tihanyi in Hungary in 1926, however the new phenomenon became widely understood and recognised only from around 1930.

The problem of low sensitivity to light resulting in low electrical output from transmitting or "camera" tubes would be solved with the introduction of charge-storage technology by the Hungarian engineer Kálmán Tihanyi in the beginning of 1925. His solution was a camera tube that accumulated and stored electrical charges ("photoelectrons") within the tube throughout each scanning cycle. The device was first described in a patent application he filed in Hungary in March 1926 for a television system he dubbed "Radioskop". After further refinements included in a 1928 patent application, Tihanyi's patent was declared void in Great Britain in 1930, and so he applied for patents in the United States. Tihanyi's Radioskop patent was added by UNESCO to the Memory of the World international register on September 4, 2001.

Zworykin presented in 1923 his project for a totally electronic television system to the general manager of Westinghouse. In July 1925, Zworykin submitted a patent application for a "Television System" that includes a charge storage plate constructed of a thin layer of isolating material (aluminum oxide) sandwiched between a screen (300 mesh) and a colloidal deposit of photoelectric material (potassium hydride) consisting of isolated globules. The following description can be read between lines 1 and 9 in page 2: The photoelectric material, such as potassium hydride, is evaporated on the aluminum oxide, or other insulating medium, and treated so as to form a colloidal deposit of potassium hydride consisting of minute globules. Each globule is very active photoelectrically and constitutes, to all intents and purposes, a minute individual photoelectric cell. Its first image was transmitted in late summer of 1925, and a patent was issued in 1928. However the quality of the transmitted image failed to impress to H P Davis, the general manager of Westinghouse, and Zworykin was asked to work on something useful. A patent for a television system was also filed by Zworykin in 1923, but this file is not a reliable bibliographic source because extensive revisions were done before a patent was issued fifteen years later and the file itself was divided into two patents in 1931.

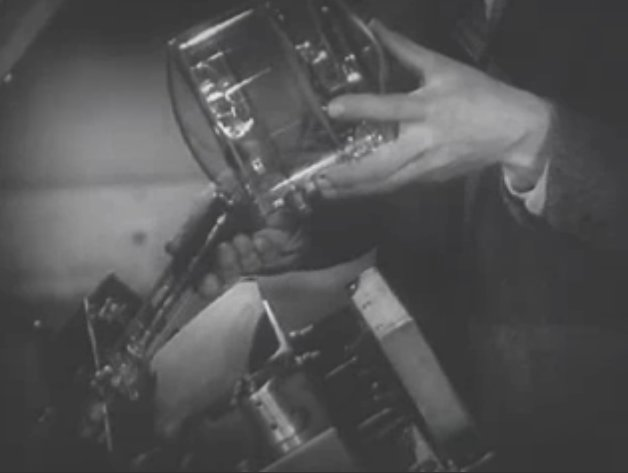
Iconoscope and mosaic from a TV camera, circa 1955.

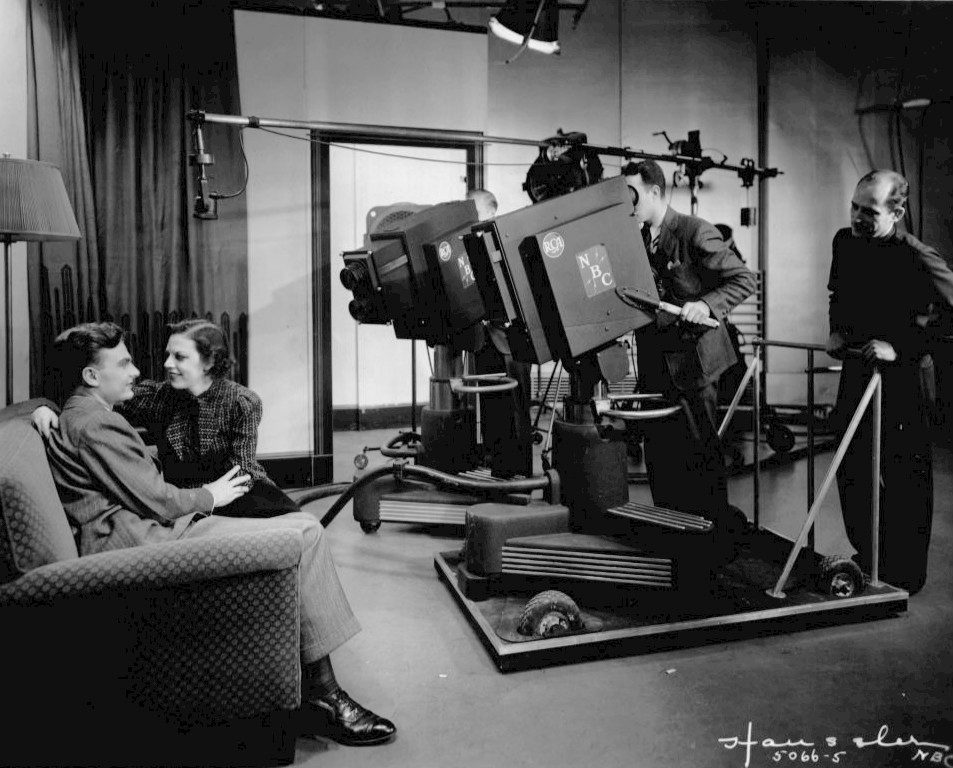
Iconoscope television cameras at NBC in 1937. Eddie Albert and Grace Brandt reprised their radio show, The Honeymooners-Grace and Eddie Show for television.

The first practical iconoscope was constructed in 1931 by Sanford Essig, when he accidentally left one silvered mica sheet in the oven too long. Upon examination with a microscope, he noticed that the silver layer had broken up into a myriad of tiny isolated silver globules. He also noticed that: the tiny dimension of the silver droplets would enhance the image resolution of the iconoscope by a quantum leap. As head of television development at Radio Corporation of America (RCA), Zworykin submitted a patent application in November 1931, and it was issued in 1935. Nevertheless, Zworykin's team was not the only engineering group working on devices that use a charge stage plate. In 1932, Tedham and McGee under the supervision of Isaac Shoenberg applied for a patent for a new device they dubbed "the emitron", a 405-line broadcasting service employing the super-emitron began at studios in Alexandra Palace in 1936, and a patent was issued in the US in 1937. Meanwhile, in 1933, Philo Farnsworth had also applied for a patent for a device that used a charge storage plate and a low-velocity electron scanning beam. A corresponding patent was issued in 1937, but Farnsworth did not know that the low-velocity scanning beam must land perpendicular to the target and he never actually built such a tube.

The iconoscope was presented to the general public in a press conference in June 1933, and two detailed technical papers were published in September and October of the same year. Unlike the Farnsworth image dissector, the Zworykin iconoscope was much more sensitive, useful with an illumination on the target between 4ft-c (43lx) and 20ft-c (215lx). It was also easier to manufacture and produced a very clear image. The iconoscope was the primary camera tube used in American broadcasting from 1936 until 1946, when it was replaced by the image orthicon tube.

In Britain, a team formed by engineers Lubszynski, Rodda, and MacGee developed the super-emitron (also superikonoscop in Germany and image iconoscope in the Netherlands) in 1934, this new device was between ten and fifteen times more sensitive than the original emitron and iconoscope, and it was used for a public broadcasting by the BBC, for the first time, on Armistice Day 1937. The image iconoscope was the representative of the European tradition in electronic tubes competing against the American tradition represented by the image orthicon.

== See also ==
- Image dissector
- Video camera tube
