= Simeon Aisenstein =

Scientist, Educator and Entrepreneur born in Imperial Russia (1884–1962)

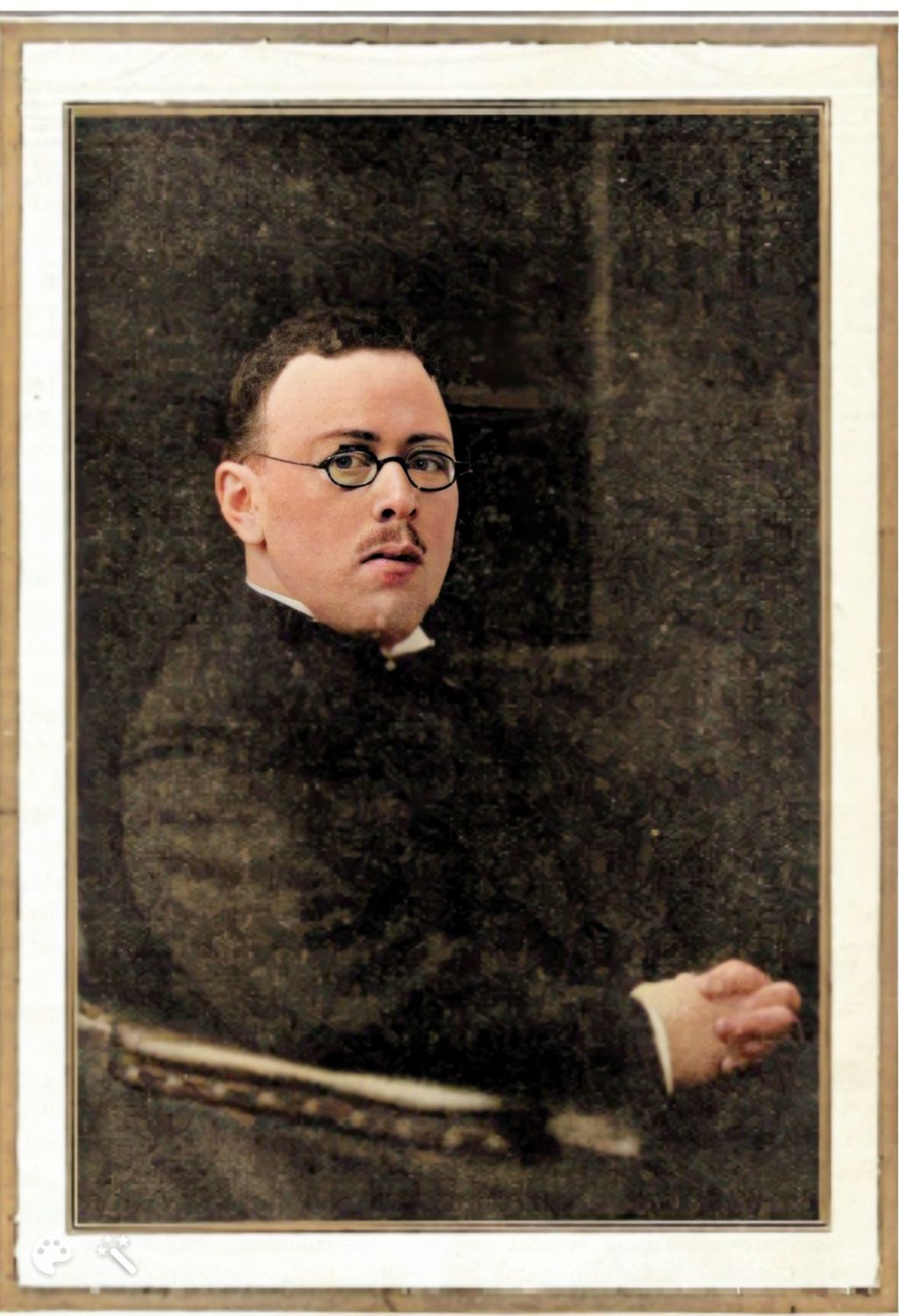
Simeon Aisenstein (about 1912)

Simeon Aisenstein (25 January 1884, Kiyv, Ukraine, Imperial Russia – 3 September 1962, Chelmsford, Essex, United Kingdom; born Семён Моисеевич Айзенштейн, Semyon Moise'evich Aisenstein) was a scientist, entrepreneur and educator in the field of radio communications whose achievements spanned from the birth of wireless into the age of television and satellite communication.

He was put in charge of national radio communication in Imperial Russia in 1906 and quickly built a network connecting the vast country, which led to his name and reputation becoming known worldwide. In 1916, he was the first to achieve communication to a submerged submarine using very low frequencies and during the First World War constructed a secure communication system between the governments of Russia, Britain and France (who awarded him the Légion d'honneur).

He was a professor at Moscow Technical University, as well as owner of a business which manufactured wireless equipment. This caused him to come into conflict with the Bolsheviks who branded him a capitalist. Britain secretly extracted him in 1921 and UK government papers show he had for some time been supplying information on his work and informing on the Bolsheviks for Britain, and requested MI5 to be shielded. For the rest of his life in Britain he adopted a low profile but still continued making important developments in thermionic valve (vacuum tube) technology and television. He worked for the Marconi Company from 1922 until the end of the Second World War and then partly owned the spinoff firm English Electric Valve Company (now named Teledyne e2v). His final achievements were contributing to the image orthicon television camera, which won an Emmy Award in 1960, and the microwave transmission components for satellite transmission. He is celebrated in the modern nation of Ukraine where he has been described as their forgotten genius. Reginald Smith-Rose, in an obituary appearing in the journal Nature in 1962, described Aisenstein as "a pioneer of radio communication".

== Early life ==
He was born in 1884 as Semyon Mose'evich Aisenstein (Семёна Моисеевича Айзенштейна) in Kyiv, Ukraine, Imperial Russia to a successful merchant of the First Guild named Movsha Aisenstein and his wife Sima-Leah Margolin and had a younger brother Leon and sister Lyuba. The family lived in the Muzychny Provulok area next door to the main Kyiv telegraph and telephone exchange and one biographer suggests the young Aisenstein was attracted both by the new communications technology and by the young staff going in and out of the building. As a teenager he closely followed the work of the Russian radio pioneer Alexandr Popov who is regarded in the country as the inventor of wireless, and later got to know him, as well as building a close relationship with Guglielmo Marconi who is described by a biographer as Aistenstein's friend.

== Education and early professional career ==
At the age of 16 he began his own wireless experiments at home in Kyiv with a spark-gap transmitter and receiver but then formally went to study at the St Volodymyr University. A year later in 1901 he spent time in Moscow visiting the Polytechnic Institute and attended the 2nd All-Russia Electrotechnical Congress. It was there he met Alexandr Popov and they shared knowledge and experience. Shortly after, Aisenstein obtained his first patent for a wireless transmitter. His father financed his education and after graduation Aisenstein pursued further studies at the University of Berlin and Technische Hochschule in Charlottenburg. After returning to Kyiv in 1905 he set up a wireless telegraphy development laboratory and it attracted the attention of Vladimir Sukhomlinov the governor general of Kyiv and a future minister of war of Russia. He then received military funding and was given land in Kyiv and Zhmerynka for the construction of powerful transmitting stations.

Aisenstein also started to test mobile field radio stations and these were the subject of his next patent. In an article in the newspaper Kyivskaia Mysi (Thoughts from Kyiv) on 10 February 1907 it stated "On 1st and 2nd February the Kyiv wireless telegraphy station transmitted telegrams to Odessa over a distance of 410 versts (465 km). The results showed that this is still not the maximum distance at which the station can reach. The Kyiv station can transmit telegrams at a distance of about 700 verst (750 km) over land which corresponds to a distance by sea of about 2000 verst (2133 km)". "Aisenstein was granted permission by the government to live outside the area designated for Jews (the Pale of Settlement) and moved to St Petersburg to open his research and manufacturing business Russian Society of Wireless Telegraphs and Telephones (ROBTiT). His father had contributed funds to government development work and this is suggested as the reason Aisenstein received the rare privilege for a Jew of being allowed to move out of Ukraine.

== Career elevation ==
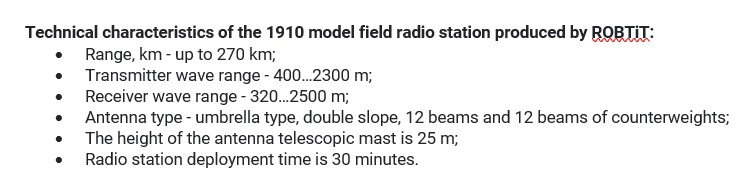
Specification of Aisenstein's 1910 Cavalry Station

A major turning point for Aisenstein was the early death of Alexandr Popov on 13 January 1906 at the age of 46. He was then appointed Popov's successor and this led to him effectively taking charge of the entire Russian radio transmission system. At the same time, he lectured at Moscow Technical University and received a professorship. He was also editor-in-chief of the Russian journal, Bulletin of Wireless Telegraphy (Вестник беспроводной телеграфии) and vice-president of the Russian Society of Radio Engineers. By this time, wireless was transformed by the introduction of the thermionic valve (vacuum tube) which in 1906 had been improved by American engineer Lee de Forest after its initial design by Englishman John Ambrose Fleming in 1904. Aisenstein then pioneered valve research, development and manufacture in Russia.

The results of his research were presented to the All-Russia Electrotechnical Congress in Kyiv held from 25 April to 4 May 1907 and this established Kyiv as the major centre for wireless development after Moscow and St Petersburg. Aisenstein's status and his about 20 patents then led the Russian Military Department to propose he continued his work in St Petersburg where he had founded his first company, ROBTiT, whose premises still stand. He visited Marconi in England and a company restructuring followed in 1910 that allowed 20% of its shares to be acquired by the Marconi Company who also owned their own Russian firm. ROBTiT collaborated with other companies in production of military radio equipment including Siemens and Halske, Telefunken, Marconi and Société française radio-electric (SFR) (which later became Compagnie Générale de Télégraphie Sans Fil - CSF). He handled a great deal of negotiation with foreign companies and by this time had become well known internationally. During his early life he was personally acquainted with many notable scientists in his field including fellow Russians Vladimir Zworykin, Isaac Shoenberg and David Sarnoff.

His development work then focussed on improved thermionic valves (vacuum tubes) and transmitting cleaner signals than those produced by spark transmitters. Much work from 1908 to 1913 concerned the use of wireless on ships including speech transmission (radio telephony). In 1914 he demonstrated speech transmission utilising a valve transmitter between St Petersburg and Tsarskoe Selo and by 1914 he employed several thousand staff.

He also turned his attention to designing much higher power transmitters using a superior design of valve. This led to the production of 300 kW transmitters, the most powerful in the world at that time, being installed in Moscow (Khodynka) and Tsarkoe Selo which were later used for communication to Russia's allies in the First World War. Also of military significance was a direction-finding receiver built in 1916 and according to historian Valerii Lysenko this signal intelligence development marked the birth of electronic warfare. In 1915 he was appointed Councillor of State for Imperial Russia.

In 1916, Aisenstein used his powerful 300 kW transmitters at very low frequencies (VLF) to communicate for the first time to a submerged submarine. A British government paper commented "the Admiralty views his achievement with great interest" but as it later emerged he had long been providing Britain with details of his work.

In the same year he carried out a major project designing manufacturing and equipping stations in France and a system to communicate with the allies in the First World War. This led to the French government awarding him the Légion d'honneur (reference: 17637 à la Grande Chancellerie) as well as conferring French citizenship in 1929. He spent much time in France during the rest of his life and used the name Serge.

The 1917 communist revolution saw his business taken over by the state and for a time he was forced to restrict his activities to technological research and design which included the Shukhov Tower. In 1918 he was appointed scientific specialist at the Higher Radio Engineering Council and soon initiated an improved radio communication link between Moscow and Vladivostok, He supervised the opening of the first public broadcasting station in Nizhny Novgorod in 1920 shortly followed by Moscow (call sign RDW) on 206 kc/s both with a power of 12 kW and its signals were received in Germany. Broadcasting stations in Russia were soon commonly using a power of 100 kW and a few years later 500 kW which was then the highest in the world using the valves Aisenstein had developed.

Despite his achievements, the turbulence of the early years of the USSR brought Aisenstein into frequent conflict with the Bolshevik leadership of the Russian Soviet Republic and he was imprisoned for short time. He was said to have been a Menshevik revolutionary. So, in 1921 with the help of Marconi and British intelligence services he escaped the country via the port of Riga. In common with other such emigres he was removed from Soviet history books and to this day there is scant mention of him in Russian reference works.

== After emigration to Britain ==
On arrival in Britain, Aisenstein was immediately appointed to work at the Marconi Company in Chelmsford under Godfrey Isaacs, the managing director who was the brother of Lord Reading (Rufus Isaacs), chairman of the Palestine Electric Corporation. His expertise in the design and manufacture of valves was central to his work for years to come. He was debriefed by British intelligence services on his work and political activity in Russia and this now forms part of a document from the private papers of Prime Minister David Lloyd-George. It confirms he had been informing the UK of his work and spying for Britain while heading the Marconi company in Russia and he presses for this fact to be kept secret (UK Parliament Archive ref LG/F/149/2/13).

In 1922, he was sent to Warsaw to oversee the Marconi Company's valve manufacture in Poland. Then in 1935 he took charge of the company in Czechoslovakia but had a narrow escape from the invading German army in 1939, and returned to Britain after a stay in France.

== Asked to investigate and assess the future prospects for television ==
In 1929 Aisenstein was asked by the Marconi company to help assess the commercial potential of television. Although much television research was being carried out the images were still crude and many in the broadcasting industry (including notably the BBC and NBC) wanted to give the medium of radio broadcasting a chance to progress further before embarking on TV. He travelled in Europe to visit engineers developing television. Aisenstein highly recommended the Marconi company to invest in television according to a letter acquired in 1963 by BBC Written Archives Centre (ref T16/67). "According to your instructions I have carefully investigated this question" and concluded that television would "definitely be a growth industry".

== Involvement in technological preparations for war in the 1930s ==
In the book Global Communication Since 1844 by Peter J. Hughill, there is an account of a collaboration between Aisenstein and three other scientists to develop and manufacture electronics ostensibly for civilian television but with planned military applications for radiolocation and surveillance systems to be used in an expected war with Germany.

Hughill quotes information from an interview he conducted with Brian Callick, who at the time had worked for British government bodies (the CVD and CCRTD) alongside Aisenstein, Isaac Shoenberg and Leonard Broadway, and he described how Aisenstein of Marconi took a leading role in arranging the project with Vladimir Zworykin of RCA, Isaac Shoenberg of EMI, and David Sarnoff of RCA. He describes them as men from similar "Russian Jewish backgrounds" who knew each other well and were involved at the cutting edge of communications and electronic technology, although Zworykin was brought up as a Christian. They decided that development work – which Hughill states to have cost about £1 million (then equivalent to about $5 million) – should take place in the UK with principal funding coming from the USA. Hughill's account suggests the objectives were to be ostensibly civilian electronic television but ultimately to provide for large scale production of cathode-ray tubes, VHF valves and wideband circuits for what became radar.

Aisenstein had employed Issac Shoenberg in his St Petersburg business and was the first cousin of his wife, and his relationship with Vladimir Zworykin went back to Russia where they had taken some initial steps to working together on electronic television as far back as 1909. The scientists' collaboration in the 1930s came at a time when there was an expectation that the related technologies of radio-location and television would be needed for military purposes in a coming war, and in particular, cathode-ray tubes would need to be produced in large volumes.

Britain accelerated development of electronic television in the 1930s, and the 405-line service that opened on 2 November 1936 at London's Alexandra Palace is claimed by the BBC as the world's first public 'high definition' service.

According to Lord Orr-Ewing, who worked in the BBC television service in the 1930s but went on to become a defence minister in the British government, he was in conversation with Lord Swinton (a key UK government policy maker in the 1930s) and was told television was started in Britain in 1936 in order to accelerate the development of technology for the military, as he stated in a 1979 BBC interview and further claims "this is how we won the Battle of Britain". Leonard F. Broadway, of the EMI company which had a partnership with Marconi to develop BBC Television, worked with Shoenberg and revealed in an IEE paper given in 1986 "One thing which is not perhaps recognised ... is how incredibly fortunate we were in many ways to have got so far with television when war came. The fact that we had developed wideband circuits, had developed pulse generators and amplifiers and scanning circuits … all this was available just when it was wanted and it is really quite extraordinary that it happened at that time". An employee of Marconi when installing valves in the BBC's first television transmitter at Alexandra Palace is reported to have told Douglas Birkinshaw, the BBC's Engineer In Charge of Television, that the high-power VHF transmitter valves from the Marconi company were developed for military purposes. Dr Alban Webb of Sussex University has concluded "television offered a credible explanation for the production of vital shared components, while keeping the development of radar a secret".

Aisenstein's contribution to the development of TV transmission at the Marconi Company in the 1930s is acknowledged by Professor Asa Briggs in his authoritative work The History of Broadcasting in the United Kingdom. He recounts that the ethnicity of Aisenstein and his fellow scientists developing fully electronic television was exploited during the intense and bitter commercial competition in Britain for adoption of a system by the BBC from 1933 to 1937. John Logie Baird, who was lobbying for his 240-line electromechanical system to be adopted, wrote a letter to Edward, Prince of Wales in February 1933 concerning "sinister" issues and stated that in considering adoption of what became the EMI-Marconi 405 line system the BBC was giving "secret encouragement to alien interests".

== Second World War and post-war period ==
During the Second World War, the production of camera tubes and radar transmission valves (notably magnetrons) became an important part of the work of the Marconi Company, which Aisenstein contributed to. As much of his work during the Second World War and early Cold War was principally for military applications, it was kept secret and little documentary evidence survives. In 1947, the Marconi Company made a commercial decision to sell its valve production to a new company named English Electric Valve Company Ltd, with Aisenstein appointed General Manager and also a part owner. The company – which later became known as EEV (now Teledyne e2v) – prospered during the post-war decades and became the largest technology company in Britain. Microwave transmission was a growth area, and the company developed important components such as klystron valves which also powered communications satellite transmission.

After the war, television services soon launched in many countries and EEV was a major developer and manufacturer of camera tubes. In 1951, their image orthicon tube started to be trialled; they allowed TV cameras to be smaller and with superior performance. The Marconi Mark II camera equipped with an EEV tube was a significant step forward and was notably used by the BBC for the June 1953 televising of the Coronation of Queen Elizabeth II. The importance of the image orthicon in television production was recognised in 1960 by an award from the Academy of Television Arts and Sciences (jointly with RCA and Marconi) for the Mark III. In the TV industry the image orthicon had been referred to an "Immy" and the term was then adapted to "Emmy" which henceforth became the name of the academy's awards.

Aisenstein stood down as General-Manager of EEV in late 1955, though remained involved in the company which over the next few years grew to acquire AEI and negotiations took place over other possible acquisitions and mergers. During a period of merger negotiations in 1961 there was a mysterious break-in at Aisenstein's home at Ingatestone near Chelmsford while he was visiting Jerusalem; the house was ransacked but nothing off value was taken. Adela died in Chelmsford on 8 April 1960 and Simeon on 3 September 1962.

== Recognition ==
Since the independence of Ukraine, its scientists born under Russian rule, such as Aisenstein, have been given proper recognition. A biographer, Valerii Lysenko, dubbed him "the forgotten pioneer of national radio technology".

A profile in the May 1914 edition of Wireless World said few Russians will not have heard his name, and praised his "brilliant attainments", saying "he is man who inspires trust is as straight as a die and this combined with a great geniality has made him hosts of friends". (see image).

Vladimir Zworokin is acknowledged to be the father of TV camera technology, and in his 1954 book "Television" that he presented to Aisenstein he wrote a personal dedication (see image).

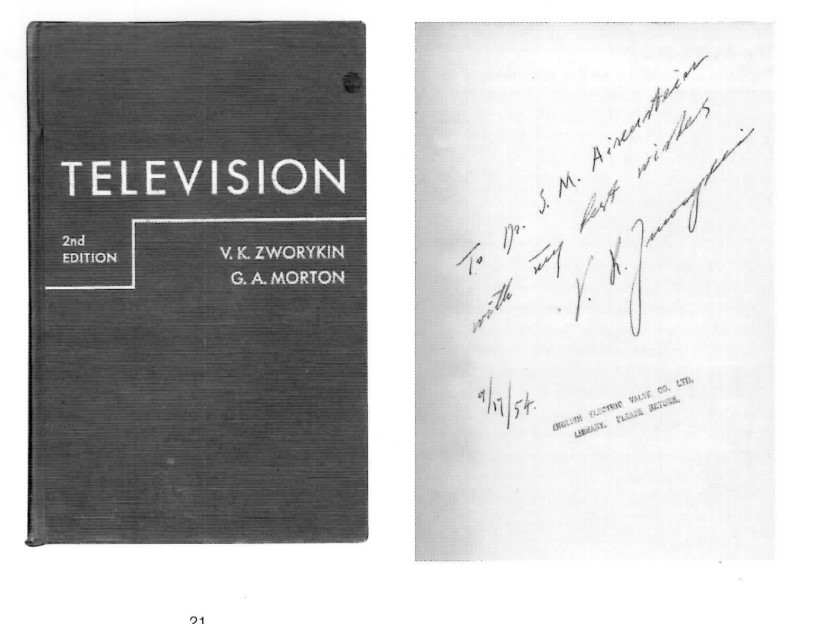
Dedication to Aisenstein by Vladimir Zworokin in his 1940 book "Television". In National Museum of Photography, Film and TV" Bradford, England.

An obituary in the scientific journal Nature in November 1962 called him "a pioneer of radio communication in Europe, particularly in the development of thermionic valves".

== Personal life ==
On 26 July 1926 he married Polish-born Adela Lindenfeld in London. She was born Wittenberg in 1887 but was divorced from her first husband Wladislav Lindenfeld with whom she had earlier emigrated to Paris, and was naturalised as a French citizen. She had a son, John, born in 1915 in Warsaw but she and Aisenstein had no children.

== Name variants ==
There have been variant spellings of his name. Prior to leaving Russian in 1921 he is usually named Semyon or Semen Eisenstein in the Roman alphabet in foreign publications. In France and in his family he used the name Serge. After coming to the UK he formally became Simeon Aisenstein, though his first name was occasionally mis-spelled 'Simon'.
