= Teledyne e2v =

British electronics manufacturer

Teledyne e2v (UK) Ltd
- Formerly: Phoenix Dynamo Co Ltd; English Electric Valve Company; Marconi Applied technologies
- Traded as: LSE: E2V
- Industry: Electronic & electrical equipment
- Founded: 1947
- Founder: Simeon Aisenstein
- Headquarters: Chelmsford, Essex, United Kingdom
- Area served: Worldwide
- Products: Imaging Sensors; Microwave Devices; Thyratrons; Microprocessors
- Services: RF Power; Imaging; Semiconductors
- Number of employees: Circa 1,600
- Parent: Teledyne Technologies
- Website: http://www.teledyne-e2v.com

Teledyne e2v (previously known as e2v) is a manufacturer with its headquarters in England, that designs, develops and manufactures systems and components in healthcare, life sciences, space, transportation, defence and security and industrial markets. The company was previously known as English Electric Valve Company and for a short time Marconi Applied Technologies. e2v was acquired by US company Teledyne Technologies in March 2017.

== Company history ==
The company began in the early 1940s as a part of the Marconi group, manufacturing magnetrons for defence radar systems. The company was first registered as a separate company in Chelmsford, Essex in 1947 under Simeon Aisenstein. Its initial name was the Phoenix Dynamo Co Ltd, though it immediately changed its name to English Electric Valve Company Ltd.

In 1959, Bob Coulson established travelling-wave tube and microwave tube sections, and they were producing ceramic hydrogen thyratrons as well. By this time EEV was the largest hi-tech manufacturing company in the UK. A year later they won an Emmy award for their outstanding contribution to electronics technology in developing the 4½" orthicon television camera tube. In 1961 they acquired the Associated Electrical Industries valve business based in Lincoln. Sir Charles Oatley was a director of the company from 1966 to 1985.

In 1962, EEV opened its first office in America in Buffalo, NY. In 1972, they opened an office in Paris, France and in 1977 they opened another office in Elmsford, New York. Keith Attwood, e2v's CEO from 1999 to 2013 led e2v through a short period as Marconi Applied Technologies, and then in 2002 he led a management buy-out supported by 3i following the collapse of the Marconi group. Following further growth under 3i, in 2004 the company floated on the London Stock Exchange.

In 2017, e2v was acquired by Teledyne Technologies who changed its name to Teledyne e2v.

== Business profile ==
In its final annual report prior to acquisition, namely for the 12 months ending March 2016, e2v's turnover was £236.4 million, of which 44% was generated from its imaging division, 34% from radio frequency (RF) power products and 22% from semiconductors, and it employed around 1,600 staff across nine engineering facilities and six sales offices. Its profit before tax for the same period was £37.6mn.

== Awards ==
The company has received 13 Queen's Awards for Technology, most recently in 2006 for low light imaging devices and in 2004 for thyratrons for cancer radiotherapy treatment. Hugh Menown, responsible for developing double-cathode and hollow anode thyratrons, was appointed MBE in 1982. In 2013, e2v received the Sir Arthur Clarke award for outstanding achievements by a team in space activities.

== Acquisitions ==
In 2005, e2v purchased Gresham Scientific Instruments (renamed e2v scientific instruments), and sold in 2012 to SGX Sensortech. In 2006 it purchased the Grenoble, France facility from the Atmel Corporation in 2006 (now renamed e2v semiconductors) and MiCs Microchemical systems based in Corcelles Switzerland (renamed e2v Microsystems and sold to SGX Sensortech in 2012) and in October 2008 e2v acquired QP semiconductor, a US-based designer and supplier of speciality semiconductor components used in military and aerospace applications, establishing e2v's first US manufacturing base.

In 2014 e2v acquired AnaFocus, based in Seville Spain, a designer and manufacturer of specialist CMOS imaging products.

In 2016, e2v acquired Signal Processing (SP) Devices Sweden AB.

In March 2017, e2v itself was acquired by Teledyne Technologies for some £627 million ($789mn) and changed its name to Teledyne e2v. The US acquisition was 70 years to the month after the original English company's registration in 1947. In its 2018 annual report, Teledyne Technologies said the final purchase price for e2v was $740.6 million, net of cash acquired as part of the business, adding that e2v had been Teledyne's largest acquisition in its history.

== Clients ==
Charge-coupled devices (sensitive optical imaging devices) made by e2v were used in the Wide Field Camera 3 instrument, which was installed in the Hubble Space Telescope in 2009.

In 2010, the company announced the establishment of the e2v microwave engineering centre in Lincoln, UK as part of a restructuring that saw the move of operational capabilities to the Chelmsford facility.

In 2013 e2v supplied the CCD imaging array for the European Space Agency's (ESA's) Gaia project to map the Milky Way. At one billion pixels, this is the largest image sensor flown into space.

In 2015, NASA's New Horizons probe, which had launched from Earth ten years earlier, used CCDs made by e2v to capture images of Pluto. Almost four years later, in early 2019, New Horizons similarly captured and transmitted images of 486958 Arrokoth, an object located in the Kuiper belt.

As of 2018, e2v was one of the suppliers of CCDs for the Large Synoptic Survey Telescope. It is also a supplier of CCDs to ESA for its FLEX satellite, which will study plant health and stress from space and is scheduled for launch into earth orbit in 2024.

Major clients include:

- Airbus
- Boeing
- Thales Group
- The University of Nottingham
- Siemens
- ESA
- Carestream Health
- Rockwell Collins
- Raytheon
- Tomotherapy
- Jaxa
- NASA
- Andor Technology

== Global operations ==
With its HQ in Chelmsford, Essex, England, e2v has two UK based design, development and manufacturing facilities (Chelmsford, Lincoln), one in Grenoble, France, one in Seville, Spain, and one in Milpitas, US. It also has an operational base with customer support facilities in Beijing, China. Over 30% of the staff are engineers or scientists. e2v also has sales, service and technical support offices in the UK, North America, France, Japan, Korea, and Hong Kong:

- Chelmsford UK – (HQ for e2v) Northern European regional sales office
- Milpitas US – Design, development and manufacturing facility specialising in aerospace and defence hi-rel semiconductor solutions
- Grenoble France – Design, development and manufacturing facility specialising in semiconductors
- Seville Spain – Design, development and manufacturing facility specialising in imaging
- Lincoln UK – Design, development and manufacturing facility specialising in microwave electronics
- New York US – America's regional sales office
- Paris France – Southern European regional sales office
- Beijing China – Regional operational support
- Hong Kong – Asia Pacific regional sales office
- Taipei Taiwan – Regional procurement office
- Tokyo Japan – Regional sales support
- Seoul Korea – Regional sales support

== Products and services ==
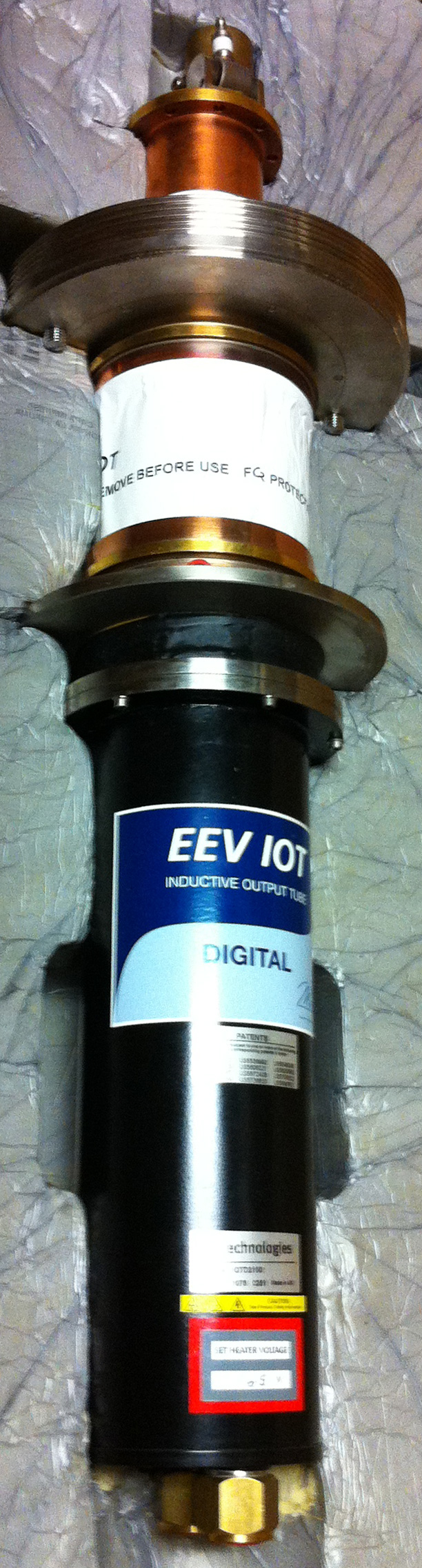
An e2v-made EEV IOT for UHF ATSC broadcast television, shown new in packaging

=== RF power ===
- Defence electronic countermeasures
- Radiotherapy cancer treatment machines
- Radar systems
- Satellite communications amplifiers
- Industrial heating & bulk materials processing
- Missile control safety and arming devices
- Digital television transmitters

=== High performance imaging ===
- Space and earth observation imaging
- Science and life science imaging
- Machine vision
- Ophthalmology
- Dental x-ray systems

=== High reliability semiconductors ===
- Lifecycle management
- High reliability microprocessors
- High speed data converters
- High reliability ICs with lifetime continuity of supply (QP Semi product line)
- Assembly & test services
- MRAMs
