= Isaac Shoenberg =

Russian-British engineer and entrepreneur

Sir Isaac Shoenberg
- Born: 1 March 1880; Pinsk, Minsk Governorate, Russian Empire (now Belarus)
- Died: 25 January 1963 (aged 82); London, England
- Resting place: Liberal Jewish Cemetery, Willesden
- Spouse: Esther Aisenstein
- Children: 5, including David
- Engineering career
- Discipline: Electrical engineering
- Employer(s): Marconi Wireless and Telegraph Company, Columbia Graphophone Company, EMI
- Significant advance: Electronic high-definition television
- Awards: IET Faraday Medal

Sir Isaac Shoenberg (1 March 1880 – 25 January 1963) was a British electronic engineer born in Belarus who was best known for his role in the history of television. He was the head of the EMI research team that developed the 405-line (Marconi-EMI system), the first fully electronic television system to be used in regular broadcasting when it was introduced with the BBC Television Service in 1936. It was later adopted by other TV organizations around the world.

As the head of research at EMI, Schoenberg was Alan Blumlein's supervisor when Blumlein invented stereophonic sound in 1931. Schoenberg was awarded the IET Faraday Medal by the British Institution of Electrical Engineers in 1954 and was knighted by Queen Elizabeth II in 1962.

== Biography ==
Shoenberg was born on 1 March 1880 to Jewish parents in Pinsk, Imperial Russia (now Belarus) and studied mathematics and electricity at Kiev Polytechnic Institute.

He met his wife, Esther Aisenstein, while they both studied at Kiev. Esther was the first cousin of his friend and long time collaborator Simeon Aisenstein. Their children included the British physicist David Shoenberg and the psychiatrist Elisabeth Shoenberg.

== Career ==
In 1905, Shoenberg was employed to design and install the earliest wireless stations in Russia. However, in 1914, the family emigrated to London so that Isaac could study for a doctoral degree at Imperial College.

The outbreak of war led him to abandon his studies, and he was recruited by Godfrey Isaacs to join the Marconi Wireless and Telegraph Company. In 1919, he became a British subject and, in 1924, he became Marconi's joint general manager. He was recruited by the Columbia Graphophone Company in 1928 as general manager. Early in 1931, Columbia and the Gramophone Company merged and became EMI, and he became director of research at their new Central Research Laboratories in Hayes, Hillingdon. He was Blumlein's supervisor there when Blumlein invented stereophonic sound.

Shoenberg's team applied in 1932 for a patent for a new device they dubbed "the Emitron", which formed the heart of the television cameras they designed for the BBC.

In 1934, EMI formed a new company with Marconi with a research team led by Shoenberg alongside Marconi's Simeon Aisenstein which, with access to patents developed by Vladimir Zworykin and RCA, made significant contributions to the development of television including developing the electronic Marconi-EMI system, the world's first electronic high-definition television system.

According to the book “Global Communication Since 1844” by Peter J. Hughill, a group of Russian Jewish scientists wanted their research to advance military technology with the possibility of a forthcoming war with Germany and raised funds for the research at EMI-Marconi. The account, credited to British government scientist Brian Callick, is supported by other contemporary evidence. The group, also including Simeon Aisenstein, Vladimir Zworykin and David Sarnoff, knew each other well from Russia and saw possible military applications for their work on television, though Zworykin was brought up as a Christian. The group is said to have raised one million pounds sterling (about $5 million at the time) from US donors. The specific work took place at EMI-Marconi in the U.K. and resulted in Britain becoming significantly advanced in television development and able to launch a public service on 2 November 1936. The military applications helped the development of radio-location (later named radar). In addition the design and production in quantity of television equipment and sets allowed the similar military technology (cathode ray tubes, VHF transmission and reception and wideband circuits to be advanced. A former British defence minister, Lord Orr-Ewing, referred to the work in a 1979 BBC interview and stated “that’s how we won the Battle of Britain”.

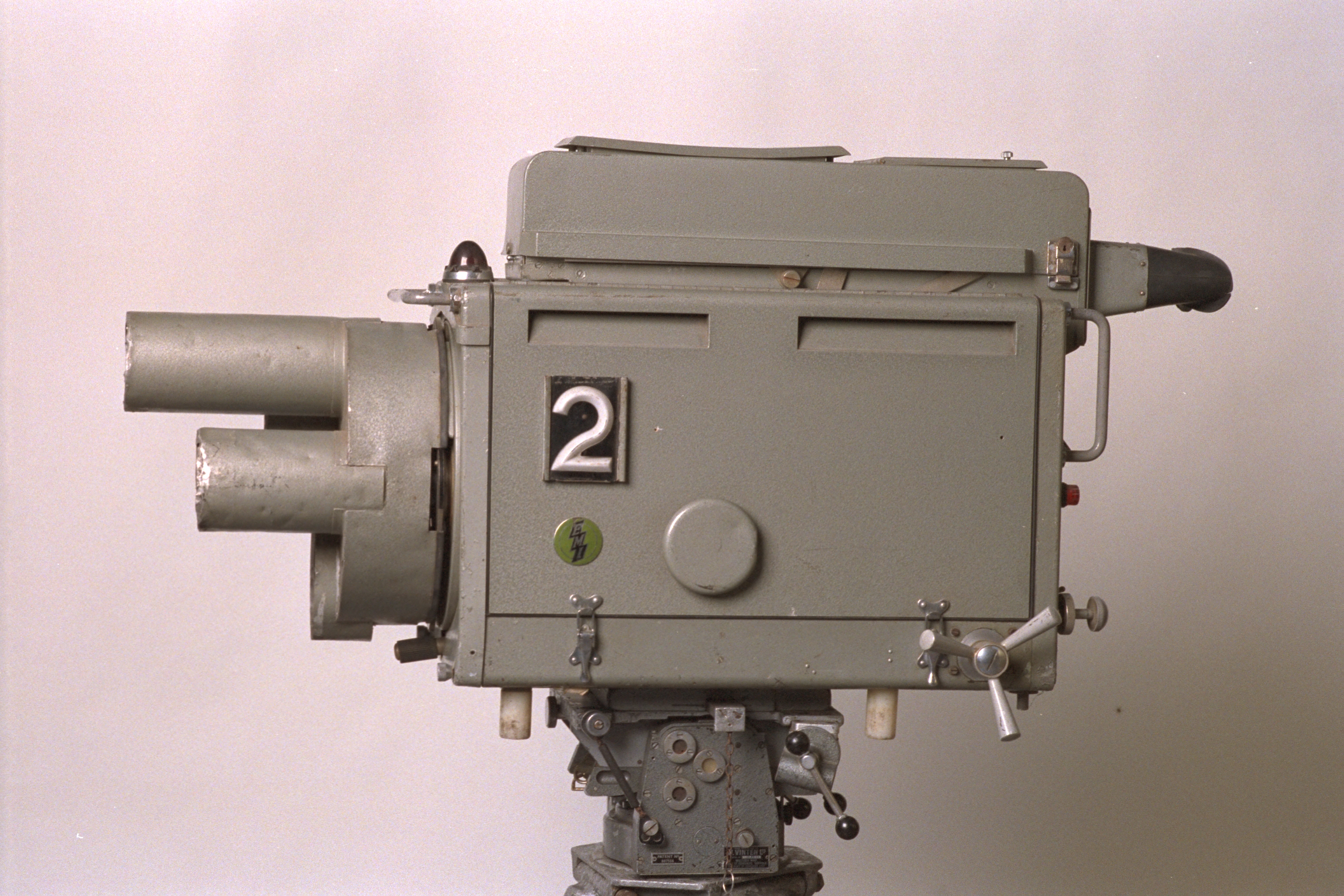
CPS Emitron television camera

In the development work on television Shoenberg's team analysed how the iconoscope (or Emitron) produces an electronic signal and concluded that its efficiency was only about 5% of the theoretical maximum. They improved upon this by developing and patenting in 1934 two new camera tubes dubbed super-Emitron and CPS Emitron. The super-Emitron was between ten and fifteen times more sensitive than the original Emitron and iconoscope tubes and, in some cases, this ratio was considerably greater.

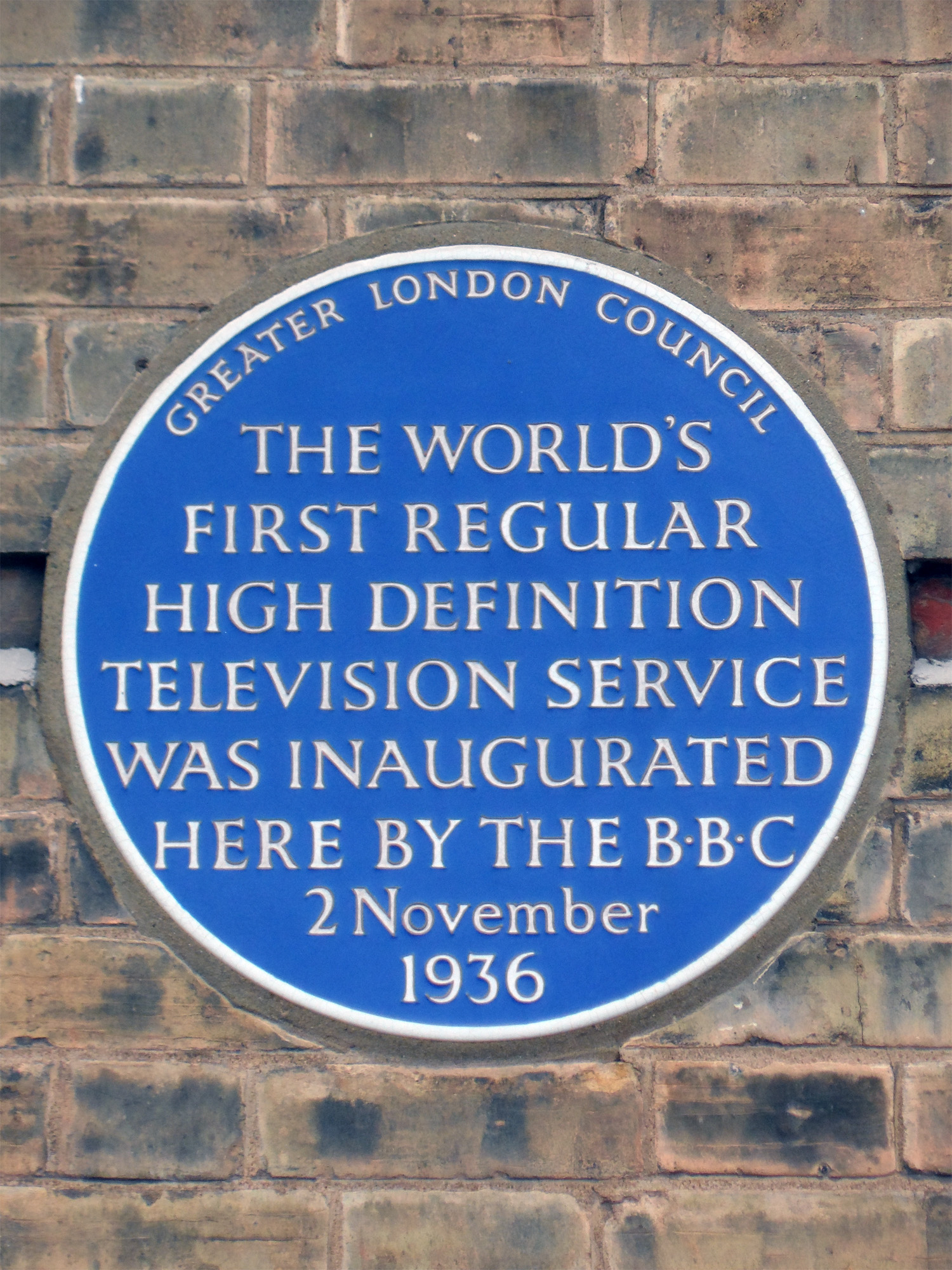
Blue plaque at Alexandra Palace, commemorating the launch of the world's first high-definition television service, BBC Television, in 1936

The same year, the British government set up a committee (the "Television Committee") to advise on the future of TV broadcasting. The committee recommended that a "high definition" service (defined by them as being a system of 240 lines or more) be established, to be run by the BBC. The recommendation was accepted and tenders were sought from industry. Two tenders were received: one from the Baird company offering a 240-line mechanical system, the other from EMI offering a 405-line all-electronic system employing the Emitron. The Television Committee advised that they were unable to choose between the two systems and that both tenders should be accepted, then the two systems run together for an experimental period. Broadcasting of the resulting BBC Television Service from its Alexandra Palace site began on 2 November 1936, at first time-sharing broadcasts with the 240-line Baird system. However, in January 1937, after three months of trials, the Baird system was abandoned in favour of exclusive broadcasting with the 405-line Marconi-EMI system on VHF, which was more reliable and visibly superior. This was the world's first regular high-definition television service and became the standard for all British TV broadcasts until the 1960s. It was later adopted by other TV organisations around the world. The Emitron was used for the first outside broadcast, the televising of the Coronation of George VI and Elizabeth by the BBC in May 1937.

In 1955, Schoenberg was appointed to the board of EMI. He was awarded the IET Faraday Medal from the British Institution of Electrical Engineers in 1954 and was knighted by Queen Elizabeth II in 1962.

He died in London in 1963 and was buried in the Liberal Jewish Cemetery, Willesden, in the London Borough of Brent.

== In fiction ==
Schoenberg was portrayed by Leon Lissek in the 1986 TV movie The Fools on the Hill by Jack Rosenthal which dramatised the events around the first broadcasts by the BBC from Alexandra Palace in 1936.

== See also ==
- History of television

== Sources ==
- "Shoenberg, Sir Isaac", Encyclopædia Britannica. Retrieved 4 January 2006.
- "Sir Isaac Shoenberg", Making the Modern World. Retrieved 4 January 2006.
- "Pink to the Palace, Sir Isaac Shoenberg and the birth of Television" by JB Williams 2021
