= Triglycine sulfate =

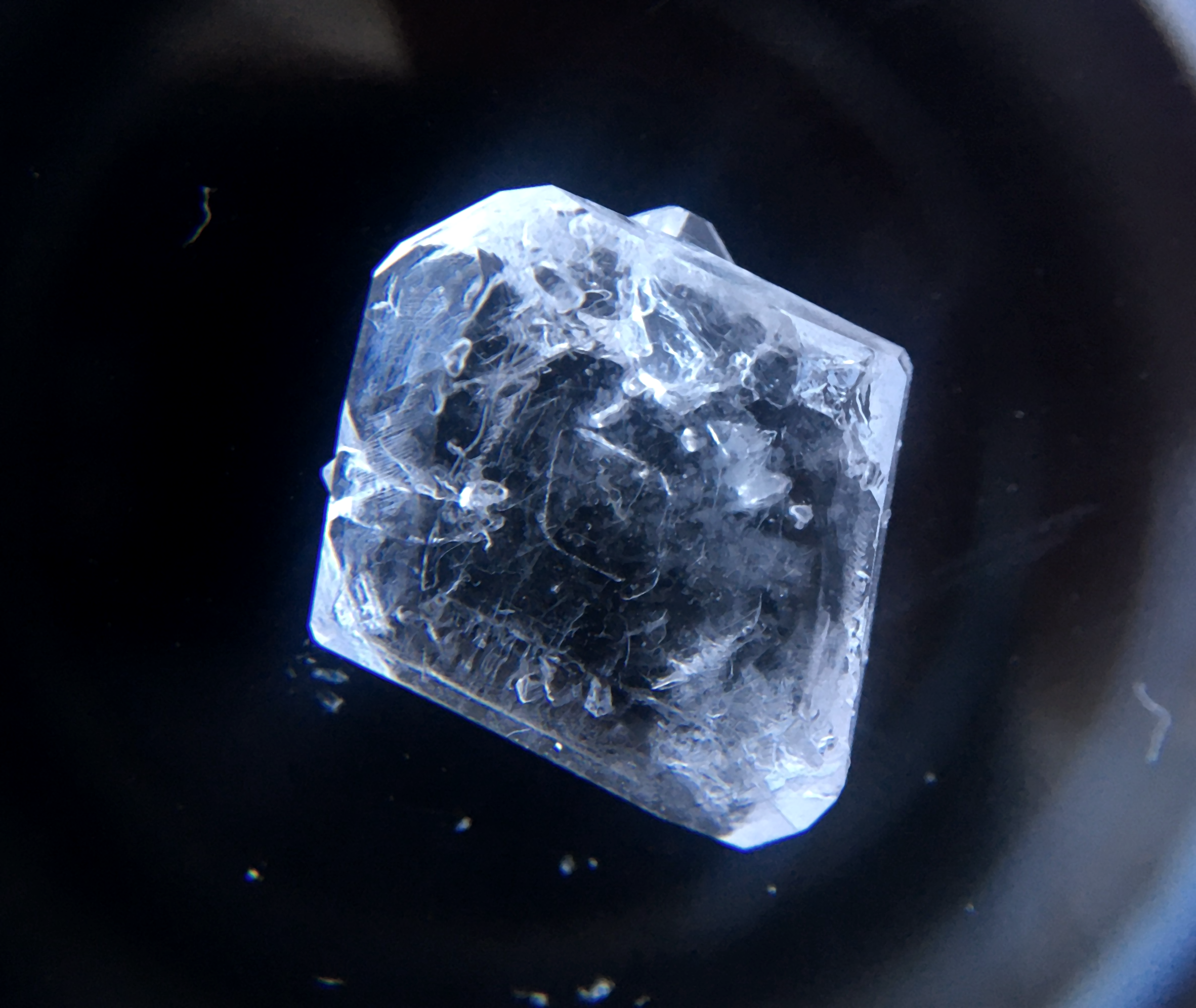

Names
- IUPAC name Glycine sulfate (3:1)
- Other names Glycine sulfate; TGS

Identifiers
CAS Number	513-29-1
3D model (JSmol)	Interactive image
ChemSpider	10111
ECHA InfoCard	100.007.414
EC Number	208-154-2
PubChem CID	10551
UNII	NEQ4Q0R0YA
CompTox Dashboard (EPA)	DTXSID40883415
- InChI: InChI=1S/3C2H5NO2.H2O4S/c3*3-1-2(4)5;1-5(2,3)4/h3*1,3H2,(H,4,5);(H2,1,2,3,4)
- SMILES: O=C(O)CN.O=S(=O)(O)O.O=C(O)CN.O=C(O)CN

Properties
Chemical formula	C_{6}H_{17}N_{3}O_{10}S
Molar mass	323.27 g·mol^{−1}
Appearance	White powder
Density	1.69 g/cm^{3}

Structure
Crystal structure	Monoclinic
Space group	P2_{1}
Lattice constant	a = 0.9417 nm, b = 1.2643 nm, c = 0.5735 nm α = 90°, β = 110°, γ = 90°
- Except where otherwise noted, data are given for materials in their standard state (at 25 °C [77 °F], 100 kPa). Infobox references

Triglycine sulfate (TGS) is a chemical compound with a formula (NH_{2}CH_{2}COOH)_{3}·H_{2}SO_{4}. The empirical formula of TGS does not represent the molecular structure, which contains protonated glycine moieties and sulfate ions. TGS with protons replaced by deuterium is called deuterated TGS or DTGS; alternatively, DTGS may refer to doped TGS. By doping the DTGS with the amino acid L-Alanine, the crystal properties are improved and the new material is called Deuterated L-Alanine doped Triglycine Sulfate (DLATGS or DLTGS). These crystals are pyroelectric and ferroelectric which allows their use as photodetector elements in infrared spectroscopy and night vision applications. TGS detectors have also been used as the target in vidicon cathode ray imager tubes.

TGS has a critical point for the order parameter of polarization, at 322.5 K.

== Crystal structure and properties ==
Crystal structure of TGS. Hydrogen atoms are not shown.

TGS crystals may be formed by evaporation of an aqueous solution of sulfuric acid and a greater than three-fold excess of glycine. They belong to the polar space group P2_{1} and therefore are pyroelectric and ferroelectric at room temperature, exhibiting spontaneous polarization along the b-axis ([010] direction). The Curie temperature of the ferroelectric transition is 49 °C for TGS and 62 °C for DTGS. The crystal structure consists of SO_{4}^{2−}, 2(N^{+}H_{3}CH_{2}COOH) (G1 and G2 in the crystal-structure diagram), and ^{+}NH_{3}CH_{2}COO^{−} (G3) species held together by hydrogen bonds. These bonds are easily broken by the polar molecules of water, which leads to the hygroscopicity of TGS – its crystals are easily etched by water. Along the b-axis, the G1-SO_{4} and G2-G3 layers are stacked alternately. The nearest two neighboring layers with identical chemical composition are rotated 180° around the b-axis against each other. DTGS and DLATGS materials are derivatives of TGS which have better pyroelectric properties and give less detector noise as can be shown in the following table.

Ferroelectric properties of pure and doped triglycine sulfate crystal
Material	TGS	DTGS	DLATGS
Doping	-	D_{2}O as a solvent	20% wt. L-Alanine
Temperature of measurement (°C)	25		
Curie temperature (°C)	49	57-62	58-62
Dielectric Constant at 1 kHz	22-35	18-22.5	18-22
Spontaneous Polarization (μC/cm^{2})	2.75	2.6	-
Coercive electric field (V/cm)	165 V/cm		
Inherent bias field (kV/cm)	0.664-5	0.664-5	2-5
Dielectric loss tan δ	~1×10^{−3}-10×10^{−3}		
Figure of Merits (FOMs) F_{i} =p (nC/cm^{2}.^{o}K) F_{V} =p/ε´ (nC/cm^{2}.^{o}K) F_{D} = p/√ε ′′ (nC/cm^{2}.^{o}K)	16-45 0.5-1.14 0.4-121	25-70 1.4 -	25 1.13 -
Volume Specific Heat (J/ cm^{3}.^{o}K)	2.5	2.5	2.7
Density (g/cm^{3})	1.66	1.7	1.7
AC Resistivity at 1 kHz (Ω.cm×10^{10})	1.7	5	2.4

== Typical performance of DLATGS detectors ==
The typical performance and pyroelectric properties of DLATGS detectors of 1.3 and 2.0 mm in diameter of the element size are shown in the table below.

Typical performance and pyroelectric properties of DLATGS detector
Element size (mm)		V_{out} at 1 kHz	Voltage responsivity V/W at 1 kHz	V_{n} at 1 kHz (1 Hz BW)	D* at 1 kHz Detectivity (cmHz1/2/W)	C (pF)	tan δ	NEP (W/√Hz)
1.3	Typical	3.20E-5	50	3.00E-8 Maximum	2.70E+8	10.6 (at 20 μm)	0.003	4.50E-10
2.0	Typical	3.20E-5	30	2.00E-8 Maximum	3.50E+8	25 (at 25 μm)	0.003	4.50E-10
