= Albert Rose (physicist) =

- Born: 30 March 1910; New York City, New York
- Died: 26 July 1990 (aged 80); Princeton, New Jersey
- Known for: Rose criterion De Vries–Rose law Detective quantum efficiency Photoconductivity; Video camera tubes
- Awards: New Jersey Inventors Hall of Fame (1992); IEEE Edison Medal (1979); Morris N. Liebmann Award; David Sarnoff Gold Medal (1958))

Albert Rose (30 March 1910 – 26 July 1990) was an American physicist, who made major contributions to TV video camera tubes such as the orthicon, image orthicon, and vidicon.

According to The New York Times, Albert Rose is credited as the father of the orthicon television camera tube, which was developed during World War II, and then later was an integral part of all early television broadcasts.

== Biography ==
He received an A.B. degree and a Ph.D. degree in physics from Cornell University in 1931 and 1935, respectively. He joined RCA, where was active in the development of TV camera tubes.

Rose was an expert on photoconductivity. He wrote a book Concepts in photoconductivity and allied problems, which was published by John Wiley & Sons, New York, in 1963.

He also did research on the visibility of objects in a noisy signal, such as from TV tubes. He found that humans could distinguish small objects in noisy images at near 100% accuracy if the object brightness differed from the background by at least 5 times the noise standard deviation; this signal-to-noise relationship is known as the Rose criterion.

Rose also originated the concept of detective quantum efficiency, today widely used in optical and X-ray imaging.

He died in 1990.

== US patents ==
- U.S. patent 4,139,796 Photoconductor for imaging devices
- U.S. patent 3,952,222 Pickup tube target
- U.S. patent 3,934,180 Method of reproducing an electrostatic charge pattern in intensified form

== Honors and awards ==
- Member, National Academy of Engineering in 1975
- IEEE (Institute of Electrical and Electronics Engineers) Edison Medal in 1979
- IEEE Morris N. Liebmann Award
- SMPTE (Society of Motion Picture and Television Engineers) David Sarnoff Gold Medal Award
- Fellow, IEEE
- Fellow, American Physical Society
