= Vladimir K. Zworykin =

Russian-American engineer (1888–1982)

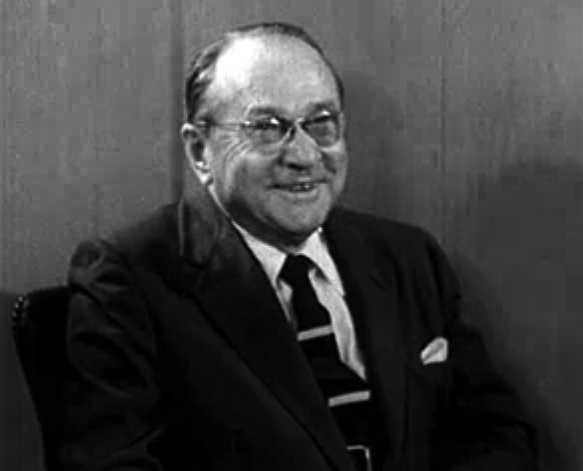
- Zworykin in c. 1956
- Born: Vladimir Kosmich Zworykin; 1888 or 1889 (Note: Zworykin himself stated his birth date inconsistently (even after accounting for Old Style and New Style dates) as various days of June or July, 1888 or 1889. Other sources show various similar birth dates.); Murom, Vladimir Governorate, Russian Empire
- Died: July 29, 1982 (aged 92–94); Princeton, New Jersey, U.S.
- Citizenship: Russian, American
- Education: Saint Petersburg State Institute of Technology; ESPCI; University of Pittsburgh (PhD)
- Spouse: Tatiana Vasilieff (m. 1915) 2nd wife Katherine Polevitsky (m. 1951)
- Engineering career
- Projects: Television, Electron Microscope
- Significant design: Iconoscope, Photomultiplier
- Significant advance: Inventor of the kinescope and other components of early television technology
- Awards: IRE Medal of Honor, 1951, IEEE Edison Medal, 1952

Vladimir Kosma Zworykin (Note: Russian: Владимир Козьмич Зворыкин, romanized: Vladimir Koz'mich Zvorykin; or with the patronymic as Kosmich; or Кузьмич, Kuz'mich. Zworykin anglicized his name to Vladimir Kosma Zworykin, replacing the patronymic with the name Kosma as a middle name, and using the nonstandard transliteration Zworykin.) (1888/1889 – July 29, 1982) was a Russian-American inventor, engineer, and pioneer of television technology. Zworykin invented a television transmitting and receiving system employing cathode-ray tubes. He played a role in the practical development of television from the early thirties, including charge storage-type tubes, infrared image tubes and the electron microscope.

== Early life and education ==
Vladimir Zworykin was born in Murom, Russia, in 1888 or 1889, to the family of a prosperous merchants. He had a relatively calm upbringing, and he rarely saw his father except on religious holidays.

He studied at the St. Petersburg Institute of Technology, under Boris Rosing. He helped Rosing with experimental work on television in the basement of Rosing's private lab at the School of Artillery of Saint Petersburg. They worked on the problem of "electrical telescopy," something Zworykin had never heard of before. At this time, electrical telescopy (or television as it was later called) was just a dream. Zworykin did not know that others had been studying the idea since the 1880s, or that Professor Rosing had been working on it in secret since 1902 and had made excellent progress. Rosing had filed his first patent on a television system in 1907, featuring a very early cathode-ray tube as a receiver, and a mechanical device as a transmitter. Its demonstration in 1911, based on an improved design, was the world's first demonstration of TV of any kind.

Zworykin married Tatiana Vasilieva in 1916, they had two daughters (the couple separated in the early 1930s).

== Career ==
Zworykin graduated in 1912. He then studied X-rays under professor Paul Langevin in Paris. During World War I, Zworykin was enlisted and served in the Russian Signal Corps. He then worked testing radio equipment that was being produced for the Russian Army. Zworykin left Russia for the United States in 1918 during the Russian Civil War. He left through Siberia, travelling north on the River Ob to the Arctic Ocean as part of an expedition led by Russian scientist Innokenty P. Tolmachev, eventually arriving in the U.S. at the end of 1918. He returned to Omsk, then capital of Admiral Kolchak's government in 1919, via Vladivostok, then to the United States again on official duties from the Omsk government. These duties ended with the collapse of the White movement in Siberia at the death of Kolchak. Zworykin then decided to remain permanently in the United States.

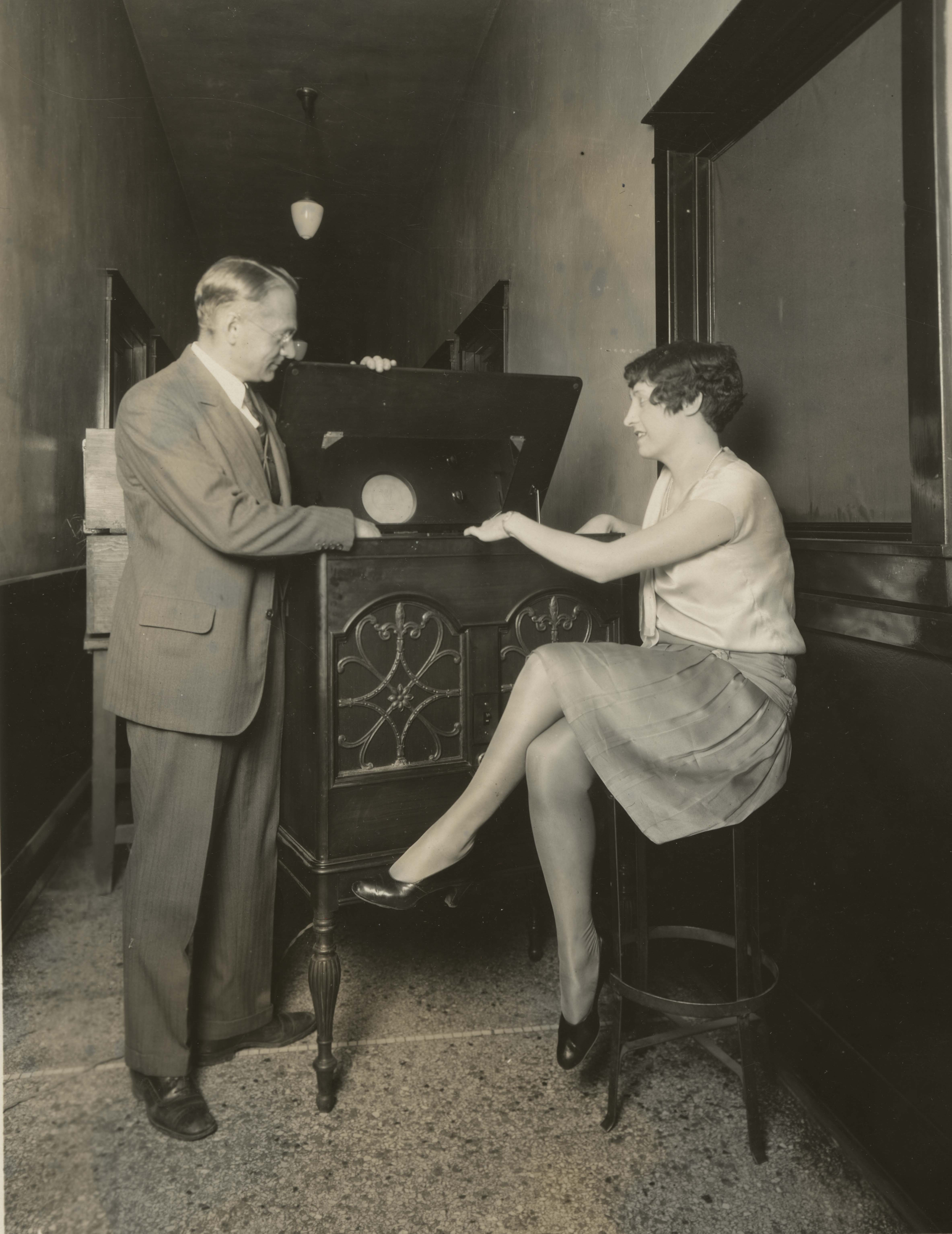
Zworykin demonstrates electronic television (1929).

Once in the U.S., Zworykin found work at the Westinghouse laboratories in Pittsburgh where he eventually had an opportunity to engage in television experiments.

Zworykin applied for a television patent in the U.S. in 1923. He summarized the resulting invention in two patent applications. The first, entitled "Television Systems", was filed on December 29, 1923, and was followed by a second application in 1925 of essentially the same content, but with minor changes and the addition of a Paget-type RGB raster screen for color transmission and reception. He was awarded a patent for the 1925 application in 1928, and two patents for the 1923 application that was divided in 1931, although the equipment described was never successfully demonstrated. Zworykin described cathode-ray tubes as both transmitter and receiver. The operation, whose basic thrust was to prevent the emission of electrons between scansion cycles, was reminiscent of A. A. Campbell Swinton's proposal published in Nature in June 1908.

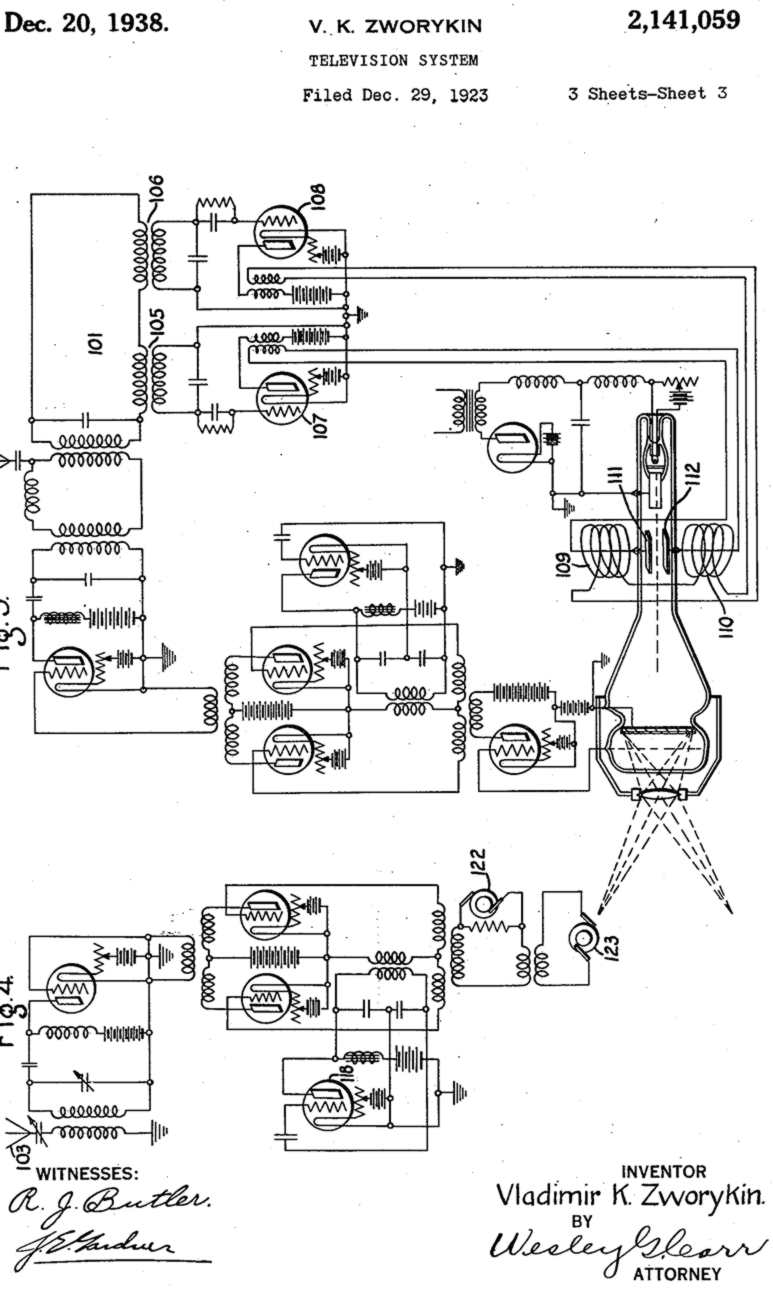
Drawing from Zworykin's 1923 patent application Television System.

The demonstration given (sometime in late 1925 or early 1926) by Zworykin was far from a success with the Westinghouse management, even though it showed the possibilities inherent in a system based on the cathode-ray tube. He was told by management to "devote his time to more practical endeavours," yet continued his efforts to perfect his system.

As attested by his doctoral dissertation of 1926, earning him a PhD from the University of Pittsburgh, his experiments were directed at improving the output of photoelectric cells. There were, however, limits to how far one could go along these lines, and so, in 1929, Zworykin returned to vibrating mirrors and facsimile transmission, filing patents describing these. At this time, however, he was also experimenting with an improved cathode ray receiving tube, filing a patent application for this in November 1929, and introducing the new receiver that he named the "kinescope", reading a paper two days later at a convention of the Institute of Radio Engineers.

Having developed the prototype of the receiver by December, Zworykin met David Sarnoff, who eventually hired him and put him in charge of television development for the Radio Corporation of America (RCA) at its factories and laboratories in Camden, New Jersey.

The move to the RCA's Camden laboratories occurred in the spring of 1930, and the difficult task of developing a transmitter could begin. There was an in-house evaluation in mid-1930, where the kinescope performed well (but with only 60 lines definition), and the transmitter was still of a mechanical type. A "breakthrough" would come when the Zworykin team decided to develop a new type of cathode ray transmitter, one described in the French and British patents of 1928 priority by the Hungarian inventor Kálmán Tihanyi whom the company had approached in July 1930, after the publication of his patents in England and France. This was a curious design, one where the scanning electron beam would strike the photoelectric cell from the same side where the optical image was cast. Even more importantly, it was a system characterized by an operation based on an entirely new principle, the principle of the accumulation and storage of charges during the entire time between two scansions by the cathode-ray beam.

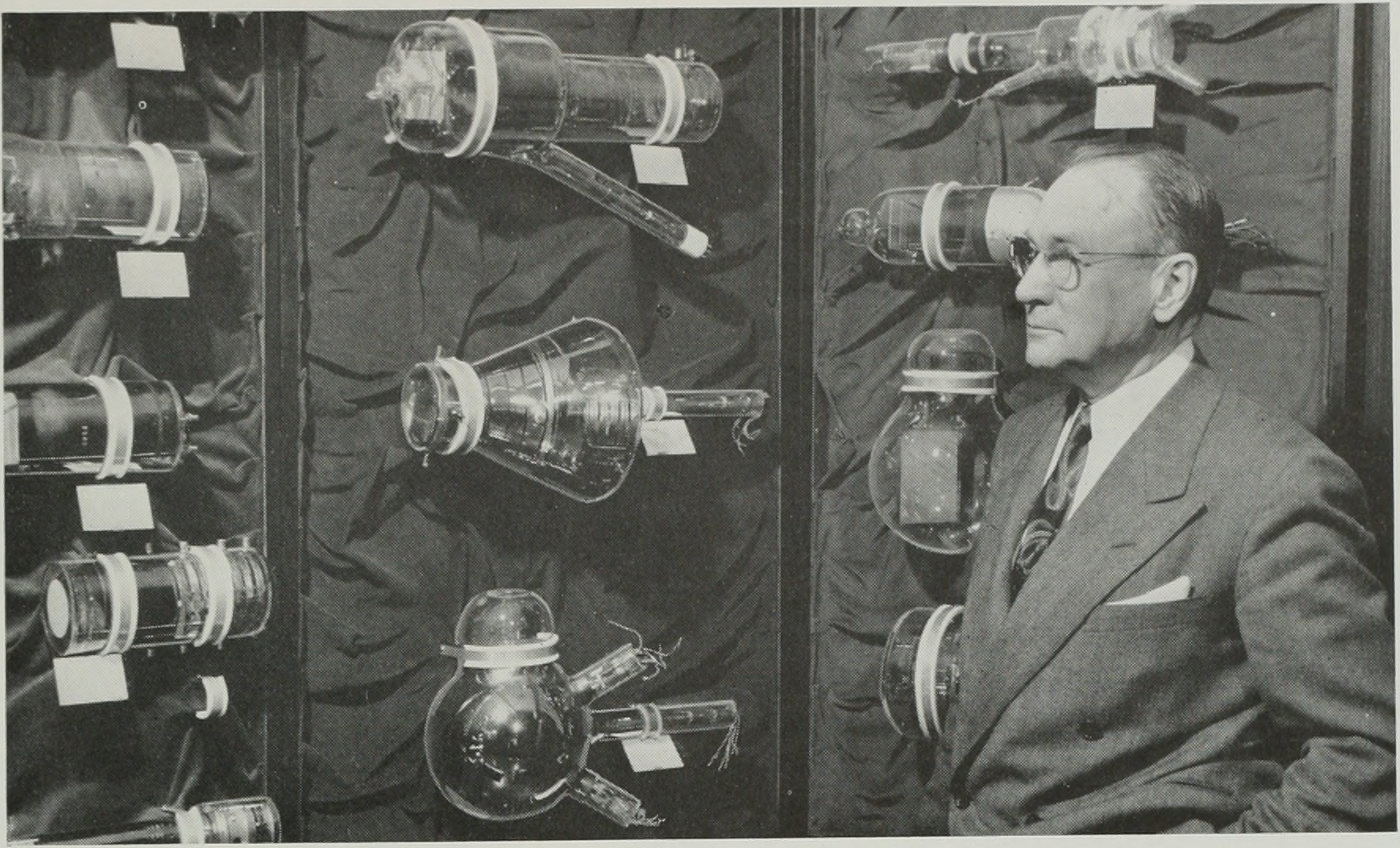
Zworykin and some of the historic camera tubes he developed

According to Albert Abramson, Zworykin's experiments started in April 1931, and after the achievement of the first promising experimental transmitters, on October 23, 1931, it was decided that the new camera tube would be named the iconoscope. Zworykin first presented his iconoscope to RCA in 1932. He continued work on it, and "[t]he image iconoscope, presented in 1934, was a result of a collaboration between Zworykin and RCA's licensee Telefunken. ... In 1935 the Reichspost started the public broadcastings using this tube and applying a 180 lines system."

RCA filed an interference suit against rival television scientist Philo Farnsworth, claiming Zworykin's 1923 patent had priority over Farnsworth's design, despite the fact it could present no evidence that Zworykin had actually produced a functioning transmitter tube before 1931. Farnsworth had lost two interference claims to Zworykin in 1928, but this time he prevailed and the U.S. Patent Office rendered a decision in 1934 awarding priority of the invention of the image dissector to Farnsworth. RCA lost a subsequent appeal, but litigation over a variety of issues continued for several years with Sarnoff finally agreeing to pay Farnsworth royalties. Zworykin received a patent in 1928 for a color transmission version of his 1923 patent application; he also divided his original application in 1931, receiving a patent in 1935, while a second one was eventually issued in 1938 by the Court of Appeals on a non-Farnsworth-related interference case, and over the objection of the Patent Office.

i) Session 3 Dr LF Broadway.

ii) Opening address by Sir James Redmond quoting LF Broadway. The group, also comprising David Sarnoff, Simeon Aisenstein and Isaac Shoenberg, knew each other well from Russia and saw possible military applications for their work on television. The group is said to have raised one million pounds sterling (about $5 million at the time) from US donors. The specific work took place at EMI-Marconi in the U.K. and resulted in Britain becoming significantly advanced in television development and able to launch a public service on 2nd November 1936. The military applications helped the development of radio-location (later named radar). In addition the design and production in quantity of television equipment and sets allowed the similar military technology (cathode ray tubes, VHF transmission and reception and wideband circuits) to be advanced. A former British defence minister, Lord Orr-Ewing, referred to the work in a 1979 BBC interview and stated “that’s how we won the Battle of Britain”.

== Later life ==
Zworykin married for a second time in 1951. His wife was Katherine Polevitzky (1888–1985), a Russian-born professor of bacteriology at the University of Pennsylvania. It was the second marriage for both. The ceremony was in Burlington, New Jersey. A photographic record of his marriage and worldwide tour can be viewed online. He retired in 1954.

New frontiers in medical engineering and biological engineering appealed to him, and he became a founder and first president of the International Federation for Medical and Biological Engineering. The Federation continues to honor outstanding research engineering with a Zworykin Award, the prize being travelling funds to the award's presentation at a World Congress.

== Death ==
Zworykin died of natural causes on July 29, 1982, in Princeton, New Jersey. His wife Katherine died on February 18, 1985.

== Honors ==
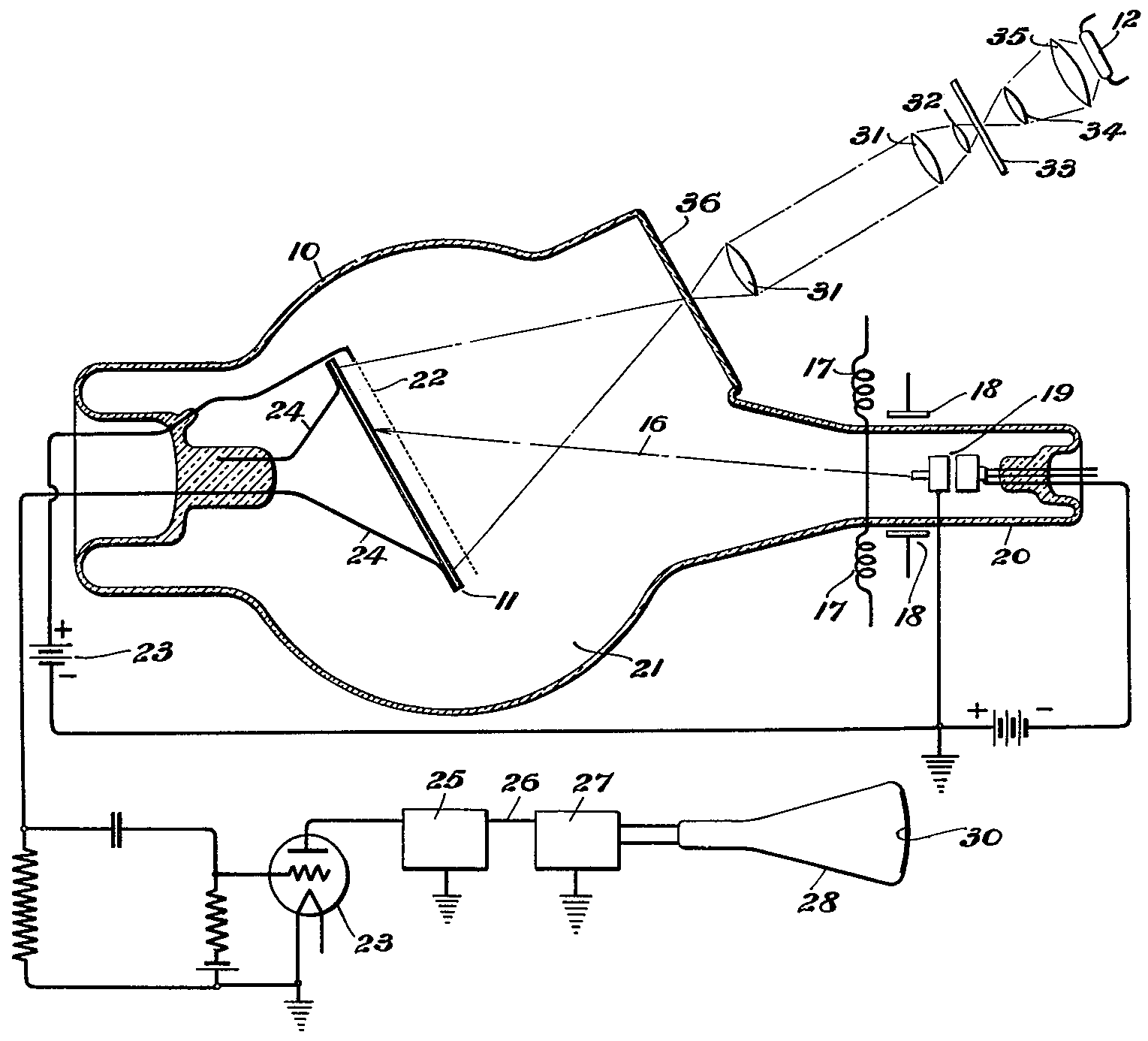
Vladimir Zworykin's patent diagram of an iconoscope, 1931, with an apparatus similar to the camera part.

Throughout his steady rise in rank, Zworykin remained involved in the many important developments of RCA and received several outstanding honours, including, in 1934, the Morris Liebmann Memorial Prize from the Institute of Radio Engineers.

In 1941, he was elected to the American Academy of Arts and Sciences.

He was awarded the Howard N. Potts Medal from The Franklin Institute in 1947.

He was elected to the American Philosophical Society in 1948.

He was named honorary vice president of RCA in 1954.

In 1966, the National Academy of Sciences, of which he was a member, awarded him the National Medal of Science for his contributions to the instruments of science, engineering, and television and for his stimulation of the application of engineering to medicine.

In 1967, Zworykin received the Golden Plate Award of the American Academy of Achievement.

He was founder-president of the International Federation for Medical Electronics and Biological Engineering, a recipient of the Faraday Medal from Great Britain (1965), and a member of the U.S. National Hall of Fame from 1977.

He received the first Eduard Rhein Ring of Honor from the German Eduard Rhein Foundation in 1980.

From 1952 to 1986, the IEEE made awards to worthy engineers in the name of Vladimir K. Zworykin. More recently the Zworykin Award has been bestowed by the International Federation for Medical and Biological Engineering.

The most complete list of Zworykin's awards can be found online at historyTV.net .

== Legacy ==
Zworykin was inducted into the New Jersey Inventor's Hall of Fame and the National Inventors Hall of Fame. Additionally, Tektronix in Beaverton, Oregon has named a street on its campus after Zworykin.

In 1995 University of Illinois Press published Zworykin, Pioneer of Television by Albert Abramson.

In 2010 Leonid Parfyonov produced a documentary film "Zvorykin-Muromets" about Zworykin.

Zworykin is listed in the Russian-American Chamber of Fame of Congress of Russian Americans, which is dedicated to Russian immigrants who made outstanding contributions to American science or culture.

== See also ==
- List of people known as "father" or "mother" of something
- John Logie Baird
- Kalman Tihanyi
