= 1922 in British radio =

This is a list of events from British radio in 1922.

== Events ==
=== January ===
- No events.

=== February ===
- 14 February – The world's first regular wireless broadcasts for entertainment, made by Peter Eckersley, begin transmission on radio station 2MT from a hut at the Marconi Company laboratories at Writtle near Chelmsford in England. Initially they are for half an hour on Tuesday evenings.

=== March ===
- No events.

=== April ===
- No events.

=== May ===
- 11 May – Station 2LO becomes the second radio station to broadcast regularly in the United Kingdom, operating from Marconi House in London, initially for one hour a day. The first radio sports commentary in Britain is made on the station when Arthur Burrows describes a boxing match between Ted "Kid" Lewis and Georges Carpentier at Olympia. No further sports broadcasts are made in the country until 1927 due to pressure from newspapers.

=== June ===
- 3 June – Popular Wireless Weekly launched.

=== July to September ===
- No events.

=== October ===
- 7 October – Speaking on radio station 2LO, the Prince of Wales becomes the first member of the British royal family to make a public broadcast.
- 18 October – The British Broadcasting Company (BBC) is formed as a commercial company.

=== November ===
- 14 November – London radio station 2LO transfers to the British Broadcasting Company which makes its first ever broadcast, transmitting on medium wave from 18:00 GMT its first two news bulletins, each read by the director of programmes, Arthur Burrows, twice ("once quickly and once slowly") – to determine listener reaction.
- 15 November – The British Broadcasting Company opens its stations in Birmingham (5IT) and Manchester (2ZY), the latter at the Metropolitan-Vickers works in Trafford Park. Manchester broadcasts the BBC's first children's programme, Miss A. Bennie, "The Lady of the Magic Carpet", reading "The Happy Prince" by Oscar Wilde. The 2ZY Orchestra, predecessor of the BBC Philharmonic, is formed.
- 24 November – 2ZY Manchester broadcasts the BBC's first variety act.

=== December ===
- 24 December
  - First BBC broadcast from Newcastle upon Tyne (station 5NO).
  - The BBC (from London) first broadcasts a drama, for children, The Truth about Father Christmas, with Arthur Burrows in the title role.

=== Undated ===
- The Central Band of the Royal Air Force becomes the first military band to make a radio broadcast with the BBC.

== Births ==
- 6 February – Denis Norden, comedy scriptwriter and broadcast personality (died 2018)
- 7 February – Hattie Jacques, comedy actress (died 1980)
- 1 March – Michael Flanders, comedy writer-performer (died 1975)
- 23 April – Jack May, actor (died 1997)
- 10 June – Bill Kerr, South African-born Australian actor working in Britain (died 2014)
- 25 June – Robert Moreton, actor, scriptwriter and comedian (died 1957)
- 5 July – Tom Crowe, Irish-born BBC Radio 3 announcer (died 2010)
- 16 August – James Casey, variety artist and radio comedy scriptwriter and producer (died 2011)
- 25 August – Derek Roy, comedian (died 1981)
- 31 August – Ronald Baddiley, actor (died 1986)
- 24 September – John Moffatt, actor (died 2012)
- 16 October – Max Bygraves, singer and entertainer (died 2012)
- 1 November – John Westbrook, actor (died 1989)
