= 1922 in the United Kingdom =

Events from the year 1922 in the United Kingdom.

Irish affairs occupied an important place in politics throughout this year. 1922 saw the establishment of the Irish Free State in the south and west of the island.

== Incumbents ==
- Monarch – George V
- Prime Minister – David Lloyd George (Coalition) (until 19 October), Bonar Law (Conservative) (starting 23 October)

== Overview ==
The social and political problems of most prominence in this year showed a further departure from those that chiefly occupied public attention during the Great War, and the country had by then almost returned to its normal condition. Prices continued to fall during the early part of the year, but very slowly as compared with the previous decline, and in the latter half of the year the fall ceased almost entirely, prices becoming comparatively stabilized at about 80% above the level of July 1914. Labour problems, which occupied so much attention during and after the war, were less constantly in the public eye. The principle of inevitable reductions in wages had been accepted by the working classes as a whole, and there were few strikes on a large scale, the worst being that in the engineering trade. Unemployment continued to be very great, but it was recognised that little more could be done by government measures for its alleviation, and the subject was much less prominent in the political world than it had been in the previous year. A further indication of the return to normal conditions was in the gradual decay of the coalition government. The combination of parties brought about in the presence of a common danger no longer worked in peacetime. Very early in the year signs of disintegration became manifest in the coalition. On several occasions the two wings threatened to fall apart, but the government was successfully held together by the personality of Prime Minister David Lloyd George until the last quarter of the year, when the internal dissensions of many months reached a bursting point, and the coalition collapsed.

== Events ==
- January – The year begins with the British Empire at the largest extent of any empire in history, covering one-quarter of the world (33 million square miles) and ruling over one in four people on earth, a population of 423 million people.
- 1 January – Transport and General Workers' Union formed by merger of fourteen smaller unions under its first general secretary Ernest Bevin, forming by far the largest trade union.
- 5 January – Explorer Ernest Shackleton, 47, dies of a heart attack off South Georgia during an expedition. On 5 March, his funeral takes place at Grytviken on the island.
- 7 January – In Ireland, Dáil Éireann ratifies the Anglo-Irish Treaty.
- 12 January
  - The UK Government releases remaining Irish prisoners captured in the War of Independence.
  - HMS Victory is permanently dry docked at Portsmouth.
- 13 January – Flu epidemic has claimed 804 victims in Britain.
- 24 January – Façade – An Entertainment, poems by Edith Sitwell recited over an instrumental accompaniment by William Walton, first performed, privately in London.
- 25 January – A letter written by Ifan ab Owen Edwards to the children's periodical Cymru'r Plant results in establishment in Wales of the youth organisation Urdd Gobaith Cymru.
- 1 February – Formal handing over of Beggars Bush Barracks takes place in Dublin, marking the first act of British military withdrawal from Ireland.
- 6 February – Washington Naval Treaty signed between the United States, United Kingdom, Japan, France and Italy.
- 14 February – The world's first regular radio broadcasts for entertainment, made by Peter Eckersley, begin transmission on station 2MT from a hut at the Marconi Company laboratories at Writtle near Chelmsford in Essex. Initially they are for half an hour on Tuesday evenings.
- 28 February
  - Unilateral Declaration of Egyptian Independence by the United Kingdom ends its protectorate over Egypt and grants the country nominal independence, reserving control of military and diplomatic matters.
  - Princess Mary marries Viscount Lascelles, elder son of the Earl of Harewood, in Westminster Abbey.
- 6 March – An explosion at a Dudley Port (Tipton) factory kills nineteen girls aged 13–15 years employed on dismantling explosive cartridges under dangerous working conditions.
- 29 April – Huddersfield Town A.F.C. win the FA Cup with a 1–0 win over Preston North End in the final at Stamford Bridge, London. From next year, the final will be played at the new stadium being built at Wembley in North London.
- 10 May – Ivy Williams becomes the first woman member of the English Bar.
- 11 May – Radio station 2LO becomes the second to broadcast regularly in the UK, operating from Marconi House in London, initially for one hour a day.
- 16 May – The final group of British troops leave the Curragh Camp in Ireland.
- 20 May – P&O liner SS Egypt sinks in the English Channel off Ushant after a collision with 44 passengers, 294 crew and £1 million in bullion and coin on board; 86 die.
- 29 May – Liberal MP Horatio Bottomley jailed for seven years for fraud.
- 1 June – Official founding of the Royal Ulster Constabulary.
- 22 June – Irish Republican Army agents assassinate Field Marshal Sir Henry Wilson in Belgravia; the assassins are sentenced to death on 18 July.
- 17 July – County Hall, London opened, as the new headquarters of the London County Council.
- 20 July – Infanticide Act effectively abolishes the death penalty for a woman who deliberately kills her newborn child while the balance of her mind is disturbed as a result of giving birth, by providing a partial defence to murder.
- 21 July – Launch of the iconic Austin 7 car, produced at Longbridge. The car will inspire numerous other automotive designs, and remain in production for another seventeen years until 1939.
- 17 August – Dublin Castle is formally handed over to the Irish Republican Army as the last British Army troops withdraw from the country.
- 5 September – An underground explosion at Haig Pit, Whitehaven, in the Cumberland Coalfield, kills 39 people.
- 8–9 September – Captain Frank L. Barnard wins the first King's Cup Race for aeroplanes, flying from Croydon Aerodrome (London) to Glasgow and back in 6 hours 32 minutes in an Airco DH.4A.
- 7 October – Speaking on the radio station 2LO, the Prince of Wales becomes the first member of the royal family to make a public broadcast.
- 17 October – First hunger march sets out, from Glasgow to London.
- 18 October – The British Broadcasting Company (BBC) is formed.
- 19 October – David Lloyd George's Coalition Ministry resigns over the Chanak Crisis and a Carlton Club meeting of Conservative MPs decisively votes not to maintain the coalition government.
- 23 October – Bonar Law's Conservative government takes office.
- 1 November – A broadcasting licence fee of ten shillings is introduced (equivalent to £22.47 in 2017).
- 2 November – English archaeologist Leonard Woolley begins excavations at the Sumerian city of Ur.
- 4 November – Discovery of the tomb of Tutankhamun in Egypt: English archaeologist Howard Carter and his men find the entrance to KV62, the tomb of Tutankhamun, a pharaoh of the Eighteenth Dynasty, in the Valley of the Kings. On 26 November, Carter and his sponsor Lord Carnarvon become the first people to see inside the tomb in over 3,000 years.
- 14 November – London radio station 2LO transfers to the British Broadcasting Company and (from 18:00 GMT) transmits its first two news bulletins.
- 15 November
  - Af the 1922 general election, the first following the partition of Ireland, the Conservative Party under Bonar Law wins an overall majority. The Labour Party overtakes the divided Liberal Party as Britain's second-largest political party and voice of the left. A dining club of newly elected Conservative MPs evolves the following year into the 1922 Committee.
  - First BBC radio broadcasts from Birmingham (station 5IT) and Manchester (station 2ZY).
- 21 November – Ramsay MacDonald replaces J. R. Clynes as leader of the Labour Party.
- 5 December – UK Parliament enacts the Irish Free State Constitution Act, by which it legally sanctions the new Constitution of the Irish Free State.
- 6 December – The Irish Free State officially comes into existence. George V becomes the Free State's monarch.
- 7 December – The Parliament of Northern Ireland votes to remain part of the United Kingdom.
- 10 December – Francis William Aston wins the Nobel Prize in Chemistry "for his discovery, by means of his mass spectrograph, of isotopes, in a large number of non-radioactive elements, and for his enunciation of the whole-number rule".
- 11 December – End of the trial of Edith Thompson and Frederick Bywaters at the Old Bailey in London for the murder of Thompson's husband in October. Both are found guilty and sentenced to death.
- 18 December – Carrie Morrison becomes the first female solicitor admitted to practice in England.
- 24 December – First BBC broadcast from Newcastle upon Tyne (station 5NO).

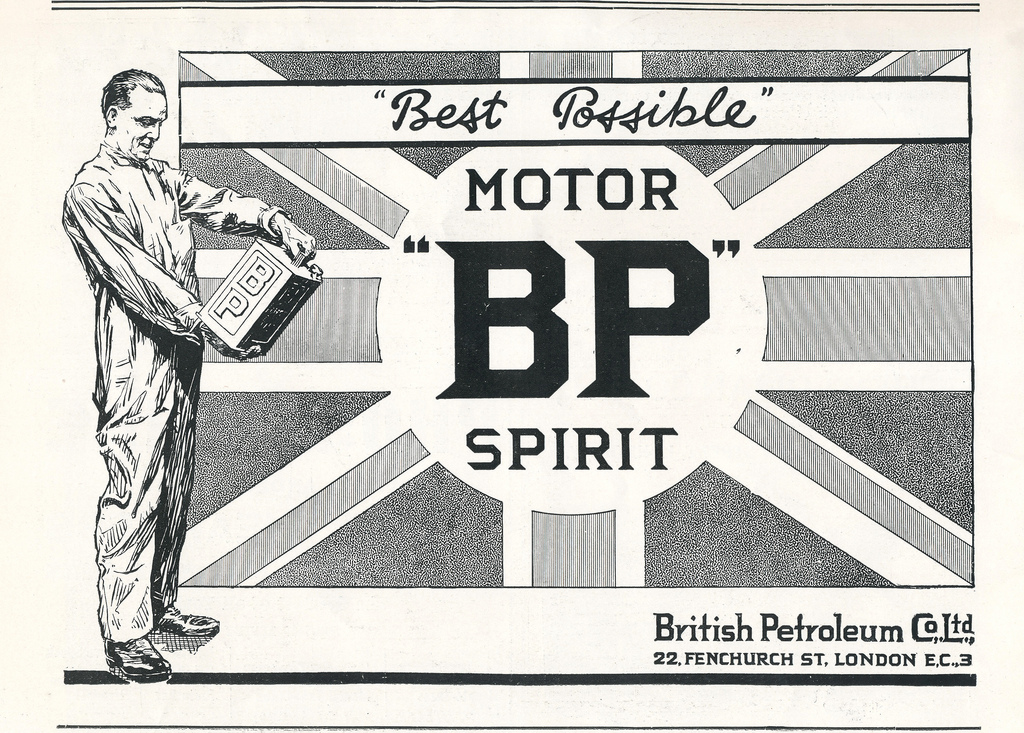
BP Motor Spirit advert, 1922

=== Undated ===
- Meteorologist Lewis Fry Richardson proposes a scheme for weather forecasting by solution of differential equations, the method later adopted as routine, in his work Weather Prediction by Numerical Process.
- Archibald Hill wins the Nobel Prize in Physiology or Medicine "for his discovery relating to the production of heat in the muscle". This award is announced on 25 October 1923.
- Production of Branston Pickle by Crosse & Blackwell begins at Branston, Staffordshire.

== Publications ==
- Edmund Blunden's collection The Shepherd, and Other Poems of Peace and War.
- Barbara Cartland's first novel Jigsaw.
- Agatha Christie's novel The Secret Adversary (first published complete in book form).
- Richmal Crompton's children's stories Just William (first collected in book form).
- John Drinkwater's poems Preludes 1921–1922.
- T. S. Eliot's poem The Waste Land, in the first issue of The Criterion (15 October).
- Thomas Hardy's collection Late Lyrics and Earlier, with Many Other Verses.
- James Joyce's novel Ulysses (first published complete in book form by Sylvia Beach in Paris, 2 February).
- Isaac Rosenberg's Poems (posthumous).
- Sacheverell Sitwell's collection The Hundred and One Harlequins, and Other Poems.
- G. M. Trevelyan's British History in the Nineteenth Century, 1782–1901.
- Virginia Woolf's novel Jacob's Room.

== Births ==
- 3 January – Ronald Smith, pianist and conductor (died 2004)
- 4 January – Rosalie Crutchley, actress (died 1997)
- 12 January – Eric Heffer, politician (died 1991)
- 13 January
  - John Hewer, actor (died 2008)
  - Allan Prior, scriptwriter amd novelist (died 2006)
  - Michael Stern, Egyptian-born educator (died 2002)
- 20 January
  - James Hanson, Baron Hanson, entrepreneur (died 2004)
  - Elizabeth Diana Percy, Duchess of Northumberland (died 2012)
- 21 January – Paul Scofield, actor (died 2008)
- 23 January – Vernon Scannell, poet (died 2007)
- 25 January – Raymond Baxter, television presenter (died 2006)
- 26 January – Michael Bentine, actor (died 1996)
- 2 February – Jimmy Sirrel, footballer and football manager (died 2008)
- 6 February
  - Patrick Macnee, actor (died 2015)
  - Denis Norden, television and radio scriptwriter (died 2018)
- 7 February – Hattie Jacques, actress (died 1980)
- 9 February – Jim Laker, cricketer (died 1986)
- 13 February – Francis Pym, politician (died 2008)
- 21 February – Reginald Hibbert, diplomat (died 2002)
- 23 February – Johnny Franz, record producer (died 1977)
- 26 February – Margaret Leighton, actress (died 1976)
- 28 February – Ernie Clements, racing cyclist (died 2006)
- 1 March – Michael Flanders, actor and songwriter (died 1975)
- 4 March – Geoff Tootill, computer scientist (died 2017)
- 8 March – Michael Croft, actor and theatre founder (died 1986)
- 9 March – Bill Bainbridge, English footballer (died 1966)
- 13 March – Jim Wiggins, actor (died 1999)
- 14 March – Colin St John Wilson, architect (died 2007)
- 20 March – Arnold Burgen, physicist, pharmacologist, academic and administrator (died 2022)
- 23 March – Robert Simons, English cricketer and administrator (died 2011)
- 25 March – Stephen Toulmin, philosopher (died 2009)
- 30 March – Felix Bowness, actor (died 2009)
- 31 March
  - Lionel Davidson, novelist (died 2009)
  - Sidney Weighell, footballer and trade unionist (died 2002)
- 4 April – Anthony Brooks, soldier and spy (died 2007)
- 5 April – Tom Finney, footballer (died 2014)
- 9 April – Billy Sperrin, footballer (died 2000)
- 13 April – John Braine, novelist (died 1986)
- 15 April – Peter Moffatt, television director (died 2007)
- 16 April – Kingsley Amis, novelist (died 1995)
- 18 April – Nigel Kneale, screenwriter (died 2006)
- 20 April – Richard Gordon Wakeford, airman and RAF officer (died 2007)
- 27 April – Sheila Scott, actress and aviator (died 1988)
- 28 April – Alistair MacLean, writer (died 1987)
- 2 May – Wilfrid Butt, biochemist (died 2006)
- 6 May – Alan Ross, poet (born in British India; died 2001)
- 8 May – Jack Beeching, poet and novelist (died 2001)
- 13 May – Michael Ainsworth, county cricketer (died 1978)
- 16 May – Colin Cole, herald (died 2001)
- 24 May – Kevin Laffan, screenwriter (died 2003)
- 27 May – Christopher Lee, film actor (died 2015)
- 31 May – Denholm Elliott, film actor (died 1992)
- 2 June
  - Raffaello de Banfield, composer (died 2008)
  - Carmen Silvera, Canadian-born actress (died 2002)
- 6 June – Iain Hamilton, composer (died 2000)
- 15 June – John Veale, composer (died 2006)
- 20 June – Richard Hornby, politician and businessman (died 2007)
- 23 June – Joyce Wright, singer and actress (died 2020)
- 25 June – Maxime de la Falaise, model and actress (died 2009)
- 26 June – Alan T. Peacock, economist (died 2014)
- 27 June – Peter Bayliss, actor (died 2002)
- 28 June – John Nicholson Black, educator (died 2018)
- 2 July – Bryan Balkwill, orchestral conductor (died 2007)
- 4 July – Noble Frankland, military historian (died 2019)
- 21 July – Mollie Sugden, actress (died 2009)
- 22 July – Julia Farron, ballerina (died 2019)
- 25 July – Fred Yates, painter (died 2008)
- 27 July
  - Joe D'Orazio, professional wrestler and referee (died 2022)
  - John Marriott, philatelist (died 2001)
- 2 August – Len Murray, trade union leader (died 2004)
- 6 August – Freddie Laker, airline entrepreneur (died 2006)
- 9 August – Philip Larkin, poet (died 1985)
- 15 August – David Whiffen, physicist (died 2002)
- 20 August – Lionel Kochan, historian (died 2005)
- 22 August – Dave Freeman, scriptwriter (Benny Hill, Carry On films, etc.) (died 2005)
- 23 August – Marianne Stone, actress (died 2009)
- 5 September – Bill Sparks, World War II hero (died 2002)
- 6 September – Archie Elliott, judge (died 2008)
- 7 September – David Croft, television producer and screenwriter (died 2011)
- 8 September – Curtis Keeble, diplomat (died 2008)
- 9 September – Pauline Baynes, artist (died 2008)
- 15 September – Mary Soames, author and daughter of Winston Churchill (died 2014)
- 16 September – Peter Henderson, public servant (died 2000)
- 17 September
  - Naomi Datta, geneticist (died 2008)
  - Ursula Howells, actress (died 2005)
- 21 September – Hugh Lloyd-Jones, classical scholar (died 2009)
- 3 October – John Craxton, painter (died 2009)
- 4 October – Hector Monro, Baron Monro of Langholm, Conservative politician (died 2006)
- 5 October – Jock Stein, footballer and manager of Scotland (died 1985)
- 10 October – Edna Child, diver (died 2023)
- 16 October – Max Bygraves, singer and entertainer (died 2012)
- 20 October – Ian Trethowan, journalist and television executive (died 1990)
- 23 October – Jean Barker, Baroness Trumpington, née Campbell-Harris, socialite and Conservative politician (died 2018)
- 25 October – Maurice Dodd, cartoonist (died 2005)
- 6 November – Ronald Blythe, writer (died 2023)
- 18 November – Peter Douglas Kennedy, folk song collector (died 2006)
- 19 November – Ann Katharine Mitchell, cryptanalyst and psychologist (died 2020)
- 24 November – Joan Turner, actress and singer (died 2009)
- 25 November – Shelagh Fraser, actress (died 2000)
- 29 November – Michael Howard, military historian (died 2019)
- 30 November – John Raymond Smythies, neuroscientist (died 2019)
- 2 December – Alan Cook, physicist (died 2004)
- 6 December – Jack Ashley, Baron Ashley of Stoke, politician and disability campaigner (died 2012)
- 8 December – Elkan Allan, television producer (died 2006)
- 14 December – Don Roper, footballer (died 2001)
- 17 December – Douglas Myall, civil servant and philatelist (died 2019)
- 18 December – Tony Melody, actor (died 2008)
- 26 December – Richard Mayes, actor (died 2006)
- 27 December – Derek Piggott, glider pilot and flight instructor (died 2019)

== Deaths ==
- 5 January – Sir Ernest Shackleton, explorer (born 1874)
- 15 January – John Kirk, explorer (born 1832)
- 22 January
  - James Bryce, 1st Viscount Bryce, politician, diplomat and historian (born 1838)
  - William Christie, astronomer (born 1845)
- 3 February – John Butler Yeats, Irish portrait artist (born 1839)
- 4 February – Henry Jones, philosopher (born 1852)
- 22 February – Lady Feodora Gleichen, sculptor (born 1861)
- 10 April – Sir John Benn, 1st Baronet, politician (born 1850)
- 14 May – Lady Mary Victoria Hamilton, Scottish-German-French great-grandmother of Prince Rainier III of Monaco (born 1850)
- 15 May – Sir Leslie Ward, caricaturist (born 1851)
- 17 May – Dorothy Levitt, racing driver (born 1882)
- 31 May – Rutland Barrington, baritone in musical comedy (born 1853)
- 4 June – W. H. R. Rivers, anthropologist, neurologist, ethnologist and psychiatrist (born 1864)
- 18 June – Belgrave Ninnis, naval surgeon and Arctic explorer (born 1837)
- 2 August – Alexander Graham Bell, Scottish-born inventor (born 1847)
- 14 August – Alfred Harmsworth, 1st Viscount Northcliffe, newspaper and publishing magnate (born 1865)
- 22 August – Thomas Brock, sculptor (born 1847)
- 1 September – Princess Helen of Waldeck and Pyrmont (Duchess of Albany), member of the royal family, in Austria (born 1861)
- 10 September – Wilfrid Scawen Blunt, poet (born 1840)
- 22 September – Sir Charles Santley, baritone (born 1834)
- 7 October
  - Montague Gluckstein, caterer (born 1854)
  - Marie Lloyd, music-hall singer (born 1870)
- 24 October – George Cadbury, businessman and philanthropist (born 1839)
- 14 December – Henry Pierrepoint, executioner (born 1878)

== See also ==
- List of British films of 1922
- 1922 in Northern Ireland
