= L. Stanton Jefferies =

British musician, composer and conductor

L. Stanton Jefferies LRAM
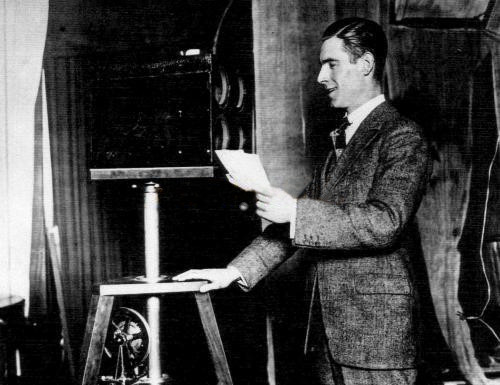
- Mr. Stanton Jefferies before an experimental Marconi microphone in 1922 or 1923
- Born: 4 September 1896; Weston-super-Mare, Somerset, England
- Died: 22 October 1961 (aged 65)
- Education: Royal College of Music
- Occupations: Musician; Conductor; Composer; Army officer; Radio producer
- Employers: Marconi; British Broadcasting Company; British Broadcasting Corporation
- Spouse(s): Vivienne Chatterton, June 1921

Leonard Stanton Jefferies LRAM (4 September 1896 – 22 October 1961) was a British musician, composer, and conductor. He was the first director of music at the British Broadcasting Company, and pioneered techniques for broadcasting live music.

== Early life ==
Jefferies was born at Weston-super-Mare on 4 September 1896, and studied organ and piano at the Royal College of Music. His studies were interrupted by World War I, when he served as a naval telegraphist. From 1919 to 1921, he was organist and music director at the church of St Bartholomew-the-Great, in the City of London.

== Career ==
Around June 1922 he became the only musician employed by Marconi's experimental broadcasting station 2LO, the British Broadcasting Company's forerunner. He was to be responsible for concerts broadcast from Marconi House, under the management of Arthur Burrows. With help from his RCM friend, the clarinettist Frederick Thurston, he gathered together a group of musicians to perform the first radio broadcasts of music from Marconi House. By the end of that year, 2LO had been absorbed into the nascent British Broadcasting Company, operating from Savoy Hill. He was its first director of music and continued to work for the BBC after it became the British Broadcasting Corporation in 1927.

While at the BBC, Jefferies made broadcasts in which he gave organ recitals and conducted orchestral performances. He composed music for Children's Hour programmes, on which he played the character of Uncle Jeff, and undertook the role of what would now be called a continuity announcer. Another of his duties was to build a collection of music recordings, which became the BBC Music Library.

He was responsible for the appointment, in 1923, of Cecil Dixon as the BBC's first accompanist, the two having become acquainted at the Royal College of Music.

Famously, the director of the BBC, John Reith, was once entertaining the Archbishop of Canterbury, Dr Randall Davidson, who expressed a love of piano music. Reith telephoned the BBC's headquarters, and within minutes, Jefferies was playing Schubert's Marche Militaire, live on air.

In 1924, he conducted the London Symphony Orchestra in a series of concerts at the Central Hall, Westminster. However, in 1926, having realised that his opportunities to progress as a musician and conductor were limited, he moved to a more technical role, responsible for the quality of broadcasts. Jefferies left the BBC in June 1935, after further career disappointments, despite support from Adrian Boult. Following military service in World War II (he received an emergency commission as a lieutenant on 20 November 1940), he returned to the BBC as a producer, continuing in the latter role until at least 1956. He retired formally from the BBC that year, though he continued to undertake some work for them until the next year.

In October 1935, shortly after leaving the BBC "with much regret", he published a three-part reminiscence of his radio work, "Soap Box Days", in the magazine Popular Wireless.

He was a Licentiate of the Royal Academy of Music (L.R.A.M.).

== Legacy ==
Jefferies developed new techniques for positioning microphones and controlling sound levels for broadcasting an orchestra, a subject he named "balance and control"; he wrote about this, and more, in The Radio Times, and it was extensively covered in a 1984 PhD thesis presented to the University of Leicester. Its author, Geoff Matthews, observed:

Jefferies' vantage point gave him the view that regular music broadcasting to new audiences required the adoption of unprecedented altitudes to music production. That view required not only the setting aside of simple distinctions between good and bad music, but a total revision of the instruments, of the physical accommodation, and of the co-operative relations between performers, engineers and support musicians, required by a shift from production of music in concert halls to production of music in a broadcasting organisation.

Jefferies working methods are also described in two autobiographical volumes by his BBC colleague Cecil Lewis: Broadcasting From Within (1924) and Don't Look Back (1974).

== Personal life ==
Jefferies died on 22 October 1961, aged 65. His wife, the singer and radio actor Vivienne Chatterton, survived him. In the 1930s, they had a cottage at Lyme Regis.
