= Cecil Arthur Lewis =

British fighter pilot and writer/producer(1898–1997)

Squadron Leader Cecil Arthur Lewis MC
- Cecil Arthur Lewis c. 1916
- Born: 29 March 1898; Birkenhead, United Kingdom
- Died: 27 January 1997 (aged 98); London, United Kingdom
- Spouses: Evdekia Dmitrievna Horvath (m. 1921; div. 1940); Olga H. Burnett (m. 1942; div. 1950); Frances Lowe (m. 1960)
- Children: 2
- Military career
- Allegiance: United Kingdom
- Branch: British Army: Royal Flying Corps; Royal Air Force
- Service years: 1915–1919; 1939–1945
- Rank: Squadron Leader
- Units: No. 3 Squadron; No. 9 Squadron; No. 23 Squadron; No. 44 Squadron; No. 56 Squadron; No. 61 Squadron; No. 152 Squadron
- Conflicts: World War I; Western Front; Battle of the Somme; World War II; Mediterranean and Middle Eastern Theatre
- Awards: Military Cross
- Other work: Flight instructor A founding executive of the British Broadcasting Company; Journalist for the Daily Mail; Author

Cecil Arthur Lewis MC (29 March 1898 – 27 January 1997) was a British fighter ace who flew with No. 56 Squadron RAF in the First World War, and was credited with destroying eight enemy aircraft. He went on to be a founding executive of the British Broadcasting Company and to enjoy a long career as a writer, notably of the aviation classic Sagittarius Rising, some scenes from which were represented in the film Aces High.

== Biography ==
=== Early life ===
Lewis was born on 29 March 1898 at 11, Radnor Place, Birkenhead, then in Cheshire, the only child of Edward Williams Lewis, a Congregational minister, by his marriage to Alice Rigby. His parents had been married at Runcorn in 1896. After a short time at Dulwich College, the young Lewis was educated at University College School and Oundle, leaving school at the age of seventeen.

=== First World War ===
Lewis joined the Royal Flying Corps in 1915 after lying about his age, and learned to fly at Brooklands in Surrey. In 1916, he flew the Morane Parasol on operations with No. 3 Squadron and was awarded the Military Cross for his actions during the Battle of the Somme. Flying over the battlefield on the First day on the Somme (1 July 1916) to report on British troop movements, Lewis witnessed the blowing of the mines at La Boiselle. He later described the early morning scene in his book Sagittarius Rising.

We were to watch the opening of the attack, coordinate the infantry flare (the job we have been rehearsing for months) and stay over the lines for two and a half hours.

It had been arranged that continuous overlapping patrols would fly throughout the day. Lewis's patrol was ordered "to keep clear of La Boiselle" because of the mines that were to be blown. As he watched from above the village of Thiepval, almost two miles from where the mines exploded, Lewis saw a remarkable sight,

At Boiselle the earth heaved and flashed, a tremendous and magnificent column rose up into the sky. There was an ear-spitting roar, drowning all the guns flinging the machine sideways in the repercussing air. The earthly column rose, higher and higher to almost four thousand feet.

Lewis's aircraft was hit by lumps of mud thrown out by the explosion.

During May and June 1917, when he was flying the S.E.5a with the elite 56 Squadron, Lewis was credited with eight victories. Back in England, Lewis served with 44 and 61 Squadrons on Home Defence before returning to France in late 1918 with 152 (Night-Fighter) Squadron, flying the Sopwith Camel, as a flight commander with the rank of captain.

A forty-minute interview with Lewis, describing his experiences as a First World War pilot, was recorded by the BBC in 1963–64 and later made available online as part of the centenary commemorations of the war. In it, Lewis describes how on his first flight he had the most unusual experience of seeing 9-inch howitzer shells turning over in flight at 8,000 feet before descending to the target. He also described his most frightening experience of the war: a reconnaissance flight at 1,000 feet during the initial bombardment before the battle of the Somme. This entailed flying along the line of fire of shells. Close passing shells caused severe turbulence to his aircraft and a number of his friends were killed.

=== Flying instructor, journalist, broadcaster ===
After the war, Lewis was hired by the Vickers company to teach Chinese pilots to fly and to establish a Peking–Shanghai air service using Vickers Commercials, the civilian version of the Vickers Vimy bomber. In Peking in 1921 Lewis married Evdekia Dmitrievna Horvath, known as Doushka (1902–2005), the daughter of a Russian general. He returned to England when the air service project was abandoned by Vickers after a couple of years. With his first wife, he had one son and one daughter.

Through a friend, the Russian singer Vladimir Rosing, Lewis met the artist Charles Ricketts, who became his artistic mentor and sponsor. After Ricketts's death in 1931, Lewis edited his letters and journals for publication. Some of Ricketts' ashes were buried in the park of Lewis's villa at Arolo on Lake Maggiore, which Ricketts had given him £300 to buy.

In 1922 Lewis was one of the five young founding executives of the British Broadcasting Company, precursor of the British Broadcasting Corporation, where he was a writer, producer and director. The other four were John Reith, Arthur Burrows, Stanton Jefferies and Peter Eckersley. In 1927 he participated in the BBC's first sports broadcasts, assisting commentator Teddy Wakelam. In 1931, he co-wrote and directed a short film adaptation of the George Bernard Shaw play How He Lied to Her Husband. In late 1936 – early 1937 he was a producer and presenter for the infant BBC Television Service at Alexandra Palace. At the 1938 Academy Awards ceremony, Lewis, Shaw, Ian Dalrymple and W. P. Lipscomb were awarded Oscars for their screen adaptation of Pygmalion.

=== Second World War ===
Lewis joined the Royal Air Force Volunteer Reserve in early 1939 as a pilot officer and served in the Mediterranean and Middle East theatre of World War II, rising to the rank of squadron leader. Bernard Shaw wrote of Lewis: "This prince of pilots has had a charmed life in every sense of the word. He is a thinker, a master of words and a bit of a poet.".

=== Later life ===
During the late 1940s Lewis became enamoured with the teachings of the Greek-Armenian mystic Gurdjieff. In 1947 he flew a Miles Gemini to South Africa, where he spent the next three years on a farm he established, but the farm was not a success, and in 1950 he returned to England. He joined the Daily Mail in 1956 as a journalist, formally retiring in 1966.

In 1963 he was interviewed by the BBC as part of The Great War TV series. In 2014 Lewis was among those included as the BBC broadcast full versions of some of the interviews on BBC Four. The selection had been curated by Max Hastings, formerly a young researcher for the original TV series. This was later made available on the iPlayer titled "The Great War Interviews".

After his last job, Lewis moved to Corfu, where he spent the rest of his life, continuing to write until well into his nineties. He became the last surviving British flying ace of the Great War.

On 12 May 1991, he appeared on Desert Island Discs with presenter Sue Lawley. His chosen discs were:

1. Edward Elgar – The Light of Life.
2. Georges Bizet – Au fond du temple saint (from The Pearl Fishers).
3. Greek Singers – A Sergeant Called Stamoulis.
4. Richard Strauss – Der Rosenkavalier Act 3.
5. Bob Newhart – The Driving Instructor.
6. Anna Vissi – Dodekka.
7. Gustav Mahler – Ich bin der Welt abhanden gekommen.
8. Pyotr Ilyich Tchaikovsky – Liturgy of St John Chrysostom – The Lord's Prayer.

His chosen book to take to the desert island was his own (then recently published) Sagittarius Surviving. His chosen luxury was a fax machine, which was a debatable choice according to the rules of Desert Island Discs.

== Private life ==
In Peking in 1921 Lewis married Evdekia Dmitrievna Horvath, known as Doushka (1902–2005), the eighteen-year-old daughter of Dmitri Horvath, an Imperial Russian general, and brought her home to England the next year. On arrival in London, Doushka spoke little English, and the couple began by speaking to each other in French. They had a son, Ivor, in 1923, and a daughter, Celia, in 1924, and settled in Chelsea while Lewis was working for the BBC. Through Shaw, who became Lewis's mentor, the Lewises met T. E. Lawrence, Noël Coward, Paul Robeson, Sybil Thorndike, and H. G. Wells. The marriage struggled, as, according to Doushka, Lewis was "a compulsive philanderer". On the strength of the success of Sagittarius Rising (1936), Lewis moved to Hollywood but Doushka returned to Peking, to stay with her mother. After Hollywood, Lewis went to Tahiti to find a simpler life, which he recorded in The Trumpet is Mine (1938), then to Italy to write Challenge of the Night (1938). In 1939 he came back to England to join the RAF as a flying instructor. Doushka stayed in Peking for almost three years. Lewis met her on her return to England but there was no reconciliation. They were divorced in 1940. Doushka married Cedric Williams and they had a daughter but later divorced.

In 1942, at Holborn, London, Lewis married Olga H. Burnett but they had no children and were divorced in 1950.

In 1960, he married Frances Lowe, known as Fanny. In 1970, they bought a 26-foot boat and together sailed it to Corfu, a story told in Turn Right for Corfu (1972). The couple settled there until Lewis's death in 1997. In 1996, when Lewis and Doushka were in their nineties, he published his last book, So Long Ago, So Far Away.

== Bibliography ==
=== Works by Lewis ===
- Broadcasting From Within (1924)
- The Unknown Warrior (1928) (a translation of French playwright Paul Raynal's 1924 play Le tombeau sous l'arc de Triomphe)
- Sagittarius Rising (1936) ISBN 1-85367-143-6
- The Trumpet Is Mine (1938)
- Challenge to the Night (1939)
- Pathfinders (1944)
- Yesterday's Evening (1946)
- Farewell to Wings (1964)
- Turn Right For Corfu (1972)
- Never Look Back; an Attempt at Autobiography (1974)
- A Way To Be (1977)
- Gemini to Joburg (1984)
- Five Conversations about Gurdjieff (1984)
- Sagittarius Surviving (1991)
- All My Yesterdays (1993)
- A Wish to Be: A Voyage of Self-Discovery (1994)
- So Long Ago, So Far Away: Memory of Old Peking (1996)
