= Godfrey Isaacs =

English businessman (1866–1925)

- Isaacs in the 1920s
- Born: 22 April 1866; London, United Kingdom
- Died: 17 April 1925 (aged 58); Surrey, United Kingdom
- Burial place: Chertsey Cemetery, Runnymede, Surrey
- Education: Leibniz University Hannover; Free University of Brussels
- Occupation: Businessman
- Title: Managing director of the Marconi Company (1910–1924); Director of the British Broadcasting Company (1922–1925)
- Spouse: Léa Constance Felicie Valentine Seta (m. 1892)
- Children: 2
- Relatives: Rufus Isaacs, 1st Marquess of Reading (brother)

Godfrey Charles Isaacs (22 July 1866 – 17 April 1925) was an English businessman who served as the first Director of the British Broadcasting Company and as the long-time managing director of the Marconi Company.

Isaacs was born in Belsize Park, London, England to a prominent Anglo-Jewish family. Educated at the Leibniz University Hannover and Free University of Brussels he qualified as a mining engineer before entering his father's firm of fruit and ship brokers. In 1910, he was invited to become managing director of the Marconi Wireless Telegraph Company by its founder Guglielmo Marconi.

He has been credited with making the company very profitable but was involved in the Marconi scandal of 1912, when several British politicians, including his brother Rufus Isaacs, were accused of "insider trading" when they acquired shares in the American subsidiary of the Marconi Company; the parent company expecting to secure a contract from the British Government.

In 1920, he turned his attention to radio broadcasting as a new growth area for the company and oversaw its introduction. In 1922, when the future shape of British broadcasting was being planned he pushed for it to be a public service without advertising and effectively conceived of the BBC, then becoming one of its first directors.

He retired from the Marconi Company in November 1924, and died in 1925 aged 58, which The Times obituary attributed to overwork.

== Recruitment to the Marconi company ==
Guglielmo Marconi and Godfrey Isaacs after his recruitment as company Managing Director in 1910

Godfrey Isaacs spent most of his working life in his father's fruit and shipbroking business as well as working as an engineer in a mining company after graduation. At the age of 43 in 1909 his life changed when he met the radio pioneer Guglielmo Marconi who invited him to take charge of the business affairs of The Marconi Wireless Telegraph Company Ltd and was appointed its joint managing director in January 1910, assuming sole responsibility in August of that year, with effective control over the subsidiaries and associated companies overseas. Isaacs, generally known at Marconi as GI, was also on the board of the Marconi Wireless Telegraph Company of America, that controlled the company operating in London. The company then dominated global wireless development and manufacture, and had twice the number of installations as their closest rival Telefunken of Germany. In his biography of Marconi, Leslie Reade ascribes the recruitment of Isaacs to his coming from a notable Anglo-Jewish family and connections including his brother Rufus, Marquess of Reading, and Marcus Samuel the head of Shell and Lord Mayor of London as well as Herbert Samuel.

His previous employment required much travel in Europe and he was considered 'worldly' having been education at foreign universities and being fluent in several languages. He had many overseas contacts and was said to be very understanding of their customs. Marconi regarded him as a "brilliant business man and financier" with a "charm of manner" and "altogether an ideal chairman for such a company as Marconi's". This was a tongue-in-cheek remark as Marconi himself was company Chairman. At the time he joined the firm it had a severe cash shortage and wages were being paid late. So he immediately made an investment in the firm. Recalling that time Isaacs later wrote the company never paid a dividend and its shares were "unsaleable at ten or twelve shillings". However, the sinking of the Titanic in 1912 was a turning point for maritime wireless and its shares reached £9 and 10 shillings. Marconi said, after Isaacs "with his strong and enterprising management, there was now enough money, and the prospects of more". For Marconi the appointment of Isaacs meant he no longer had to direct the firm's business and concentrated on research and development.

Many talented engineers were hired by Issacs including Isaac Shoenberg in 1914 who rose to become joint General Manager, and Simeon Aisenstein who was secretly extracted from Soviet Russia in 1921.

== Involvement in early broadcasting and the foundation of the BBC ==
Godfrey Issacs with Dane Nellie Melba (left) and Mrs Lea Constance Isaacs

By the start of the 1920s wireless was extensively used for communication, both civil and military and was viewed as vital. Though due to its then technical limitations of often unstable transmitters, was considered vulnerable to interference. When experimental speech was first broadcast there was hostility, especially from the military, to what was considered would be simply public entertainment. After the start of radio in North America and some European countries, pressure mounted in Britain from radio manufacturers and enthusiasts but the form that broadcasting would take was highly contended. Some argued for commercial radio along the lines of the United States while others feared the chaos that had been reported there.

Isaacs was enthusiastic about using wireless for radio broadcasting and was behind the Marconi company broadcasting Dame Nellie Melba from its New Street works in Chelmsford, Essex on 15 June 1920. The installation of a longwave transmitter with a power of 6 kW on 2500 metres was completed and on 15 January 1920 the first speech tests carried out. A GPO licence for two 30 minute per day regular broadcasts was issued on 23 February 1920 with callsign MZX. Power was then increased to 15 kW on 2750 metres (109kc/s) and regular broadcasts started on 6 March. Melba's performance in June was hailed as the first pre-announced broadcast of public entertainment in the world and was followed by performances from Lauritz Melchior and Clara Butt. When the station was forced to cease broadcasting, due to a complaint of interference, there was a sizeable protest from listeners and an experimental licence 2MT was granted for a station based at nearby Writtle, Essex from February 1922. Pressure then built for regular scheduled radio broadcasting in Britain.

Among the obstacles Isaacs had to fight to change was the government's restriction on radio receiving licences. It had long limited the number to 4000 "men of good character" born in Britain who had to supply two good references.

In a 2018 peer-reviewed paper entitled "Marconi Proposes: Why it's time to rethink the birth of the BBC" the media historian David Prosser from The University of Bristol used newly discovered material to show that the case for public service broadcasting was made by Godfrey Isaacs (then managing director of the Marconi Company) in a meeting at the General Post Office on 18 May 1922.

Isaacs and Marconi are pleased with a demonstration of a Car Radio in the early 1920s

According to Prosser "The 39 members of the wireless trade invited to the GPO's headquarters near St Pauls in London, on 18 May 1922 were keenly aware that the future of a new industry rested on their shoulders and that failure might mean, as one participant noted, this 'whole delightful enterprise which fascinates everybody and which promises good business, will end in a fizzle and disappointment'. This meeting is one of the most significant events in the history of British broadcasting and it took place behind closed doors."

A transcript of the meeting was thought to be lost and although its outcome, the creation of the licence fee funded British Broadcasting Company (BBC) was clear, the deliberations were not known and an inaccurate assumption made that the Post Office had made the proposal.

"It is Godfrey Isaacs, the managing director of Marconi, who emerges from the pages of this transcript as the dominant force in the room. At Isaacs' suggestion, twenty companies indicated at the outset 'a desire to have licences". With broadcasting to be allowed in only eight cities, the challenges were evident during a lengthy discussion regarding mutual interference, transmitter power and how slots might be divided between the different broadcasting companies".

Of the wireless set manufacturers present at the meeting only one, Metropolitan Vickers whose parent was US firm Westinghouse disagreed with the proposal for a single non advertising-based entity, But Isaacs used his company's clout stating he didn't believe a 'transmitting station can be erected to work efficiently' without using Marconi patented technology, which he would only make available to his single scheme.

Prosser concludes: "We can identify the exact moment the BBC was conceived. It was not the Post Office that proposed the BBC, but Godfrey Isaacs of Marconi."

Shortly after its creation in November 1922 Isaacs was made the first appointed director of the BBC and remained so until his death.

== Recognition ==
On 10 November 2021, a plaque in recognition of the life and work of Isaacs was unveiled at the site of the Marconi works in Chelmsford, Essex.

== Personal life and family ==
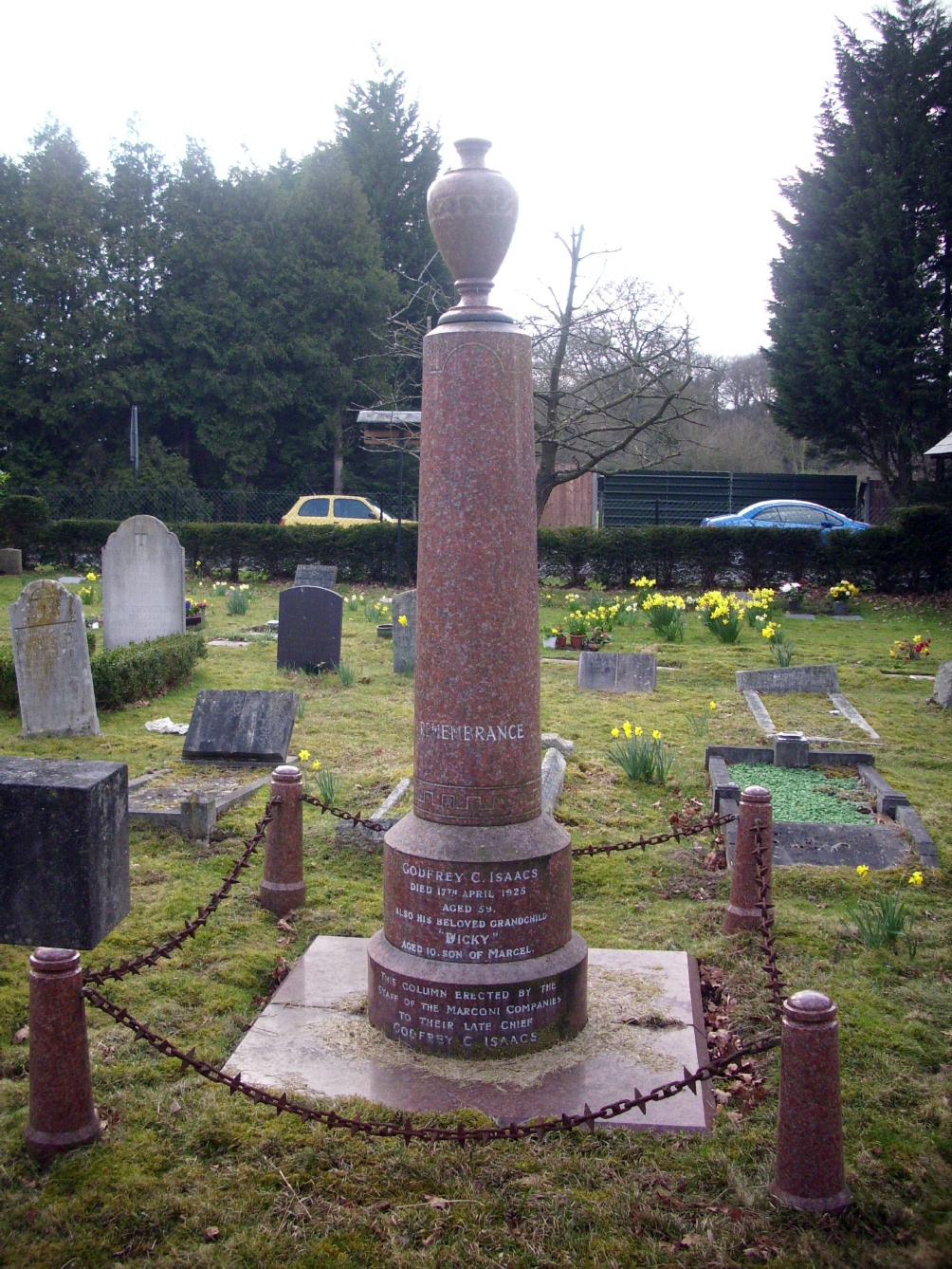
Gravestone of Isaacs and family members

He married Léa Constance Felicie Valentine Seta (1874–1956), a French opera singer with the professional surname Perelli on 27 December 1892 in Paris and they had two sons, Marcel Godfrey (born 1893) and Dennys Godfrey (born 1896). Marcel Godfrey Isaacs married Marie Louise Cattier, daughter of prominent Belgian banker and philanthropist Félicien Cattier, who was also his business associate.

In 1913, in the wake of the Marconi shares scandal Godfrey Issacs successfully sued Cecil Chesterton for criminal libel for remarks considered antisemitic. This led to a rift between Isaacs and his brothers.

Isaacs died shortly after suffering from a stroke. He was buried at Chertsey Cemetery in Runnymede, Surrey. The fact he was buried in Catholic ceremony came as surprise to his family since Isaacs had never shown interest in Catholicism, though it appeared that his wife, who was Catholic, had him baptised on his death bed.
