= 1923 in British radio =

This is a list of events from British radio in 1923.

== Events ==
=== January ===
- 8 January – First outside broadcast by the British Broadcasting Company, a British National Opera Company production of The Magic Flute from the Royal Opera House, Covent Garden, London.
- 18 January – The Postmaster General grants the BBC a licence to broadcast.

=== February ===
- 13 February – First BBC broadcast from Cardiff (station 5WA). Mostyn Thomas opens the programme, singing Dafydd y Garreg Wen and Gwilym Davies becomes the first speaker to broadcast in the Welsh language.

=== March ===
- 6 March – First BBC broadcast from Glasgow (station 5SC). It broadcasts excerpts from an opera.
- 19 March – First BBC outside broadcast in Scotland, from the Coliseum Theatre, Glasgow.
- 26 March – First broadcast of a dance band, by Marius B Winter and his Dance Orchestra.

=== April ===
- April – First BBC broadcast of an SOS message, for a woman to attend the bedside of her dying brother.

=== May ===
- 2 May – Women's Hour, the first BBC programme for women (and predecessor of the later Woman's Hour), is broadcast.
- 24 May – The first live broadcast of a dance band, The Carlton Hotel Dance Band, leader Ben Davis.
- 30 May – BBC Cardiff (station 5WA) broadcasts the first full performance of a new orchestral opera.
- 31 May – Yorkshire-born Norman Clapham makes his BBC debut as 'John Henry', one of the first comedians to adapt to the medium of radio.

=== June ===
- 6 June – Edgar Wallace broadcasts from The Derby for the BBC, becoming the first British radio sports journalist.

=== July ===
- 18 July – First ever known broadcast of a complete Shakespeare play, Twelfth Night, and the first dramatic production from the BBC Manchester station.

=== September ===
- 28 September – Vol. 1 No. 1 of The Radio Times, the world's first broadcast listings magazine, detailing official programmes of the British Broadcasting Company for the week commencing Sunday 30 September, is published.
- September – The BBC delivers its first live spoken word outside broadcast, relaying a speech by Ernest Rutherford from a British Association meeting held at the Philharmonic Hall, Liverpool. The speech is relayed to Manchester and London, and from London to Glasgow, Newcastle, Cardiff and Birmingham, and broadcast from each of those cities.

=== October ===
- 3 October – The first live broadcast of dance music from the Savoy Hotel, by the Savoy Havana Band.
- 10 October – Official opening of the BBC's 2BD Aberdeen radio station, the first programme of which, at 9 pm, is an address by the Marquess of Aberdeen and Temair and music from the Pipers and Military Band of 2nd Gordon Highlanders. (Note: It is probable that 2BD Aberdeen broadcast on an experimental and testing basis, prior to this date, without being listed in The Radio Times.)
- 17 October – Official opening of the BBC's 6BM Bournemouth radio station, the first programme of which, at 8 pm, is the Bournemouth Municipal Military Band conducted by Captain W. Featherston. (Note: It is probable that 6BM Bournemouth broadcast on an experimental and testing basis, prior to this date, without being listed in The Radio Times.)

=== November ===
- 16 November – First BBC broadcast from Sheffield (station 2FL).

=== December ===
- 2 December – The first BBC radio broadcast in Gaelic language is broadcast throughout Scotland. It is a 15-minute religious address by Rev. John Bain, recorded in the High United Free Church in Aberdeen. Two weeks later, a recital of Gaelic singing is aired.
- 19 December – The BBC broadcasts an adaptation of A Christmas Carol, Dickens' seasonal story, made by R. E. Jeffrey.
- 31 December – The BBC broadcasts the chimes of Big Ben for the first time.

== Births ==
- 15 January – Ivor Cutler, Scottish poet, songwriter and humorist (died 2006)
- 26 January – Patricia Hughes, continuity announcer (died 2013)
- 2 March – Jean Metcalfe, radio broadcaster (died 2000)
- 16 July – Larry Stephens, comedy scriptwriter (died 1959)
- 10 October – Nicholas Parsons, entertainer (died 2020)
- 13 October – Cyril Shaps, character actor (died 2003)
- 3 December – Trevor Bailey, cricketer and commentator (died 2011)
- 22 December – John Ebdon, radio broadcaster, Graecophile, author and director of the London Planetarium (died 2005)
