= 6BM =

English radio station

- Bournemouth; England

Programming
- Format: News, information, entertainment

Ownership
- Owner: British Broadcasting Company, British Broadcasting Corporation

History
- First air date: 17 October 1923; 102 years ago
- Last air date: June 1939; 87 years ago

6BM was a local radio station broadcast by the British Broadcasting Company (later the British Broadcasting Corporation). The station transmitted from its studio in Bournemouth above a pram and cycle shop at 72 Holdenhurst Road. It could be heard up to about 25 miles (40 km) away.

It was launched on 17 October 1923 and its first programme, at 8 pm, was the Bournemouth Municipal Military Band conducted by Captain W. Featherston.

Addresses were given by the mayor of Bournemouth, C H Cartwright (introduced by John Reith, General Manager of the BBC) and Viscount Burnham (introduced by Lord Gainford, chairman of the BBC).

It was the last of the 8 original stations set up by the BBC, other stations included 2BE and 2LO.

The phrase 'We do hope you can smell the pines', referring to the well known pine trees of the resort of Bournemouth, was the original call sign of the station. It was described by Lord Reith as 'the jewel in the crown of the BBC.'

The station closed in June 1939 and two months later, with the outbreak of World War II, all local stations were consolidated into the Home Service.

A blue plaque was unveiled on the site of the former studio in 2022 to mark 99 years since the station began.
