= Honour (film) =

- Directed by: Shan Khan
- Written by: Shan Khan
- Produced by: Jason Newmark; Nisha Parti
- Starring: Paddy Considine; Aiysha Hart; Faraz Ayub; Shubham Saraf; Harvey Virdi; Nikesh Patel
- Cinematography: David Higgs
- Edited by: Beverley Mills
- Music by: Theo Green
- Production companies: Isle of Man Film; Newscope Films; Parti Productions; Code Red
- Distributed by: 108 Media; Pinewood Pictures
- Release date: 4 April 2014 (UK)
- Running time: 104 minutes
- Country: United Kingdom
- Language: English

Honour is a 2014 British contemporary thriller film focusing on "honour killings".

== Plot ==
The story depicts a young woman, Mona, living in London with her family of Pakistani origins. Mona has a boyfriend of whom her family do not approve, and believe the relationship to be a blight on the family's honour. After plans to elope fail, Mona is forced to go on the run from her family, who attempt to locate and punish her, which will likely lead to her being killed.

== Cast ==
- Paddy Considine as Bounty Hunter
- Aiysha Hart as Mona
- Faraz Ayub as Kasim
- Shubham Saraf as Adel
- Harvey Virdi as Mona's mother
- Nikesh Patel as Tanvir

== Reception ==
The critical reception was mixed, receiving a 43% rating on Rotten Tomatoes with a consensus that the positives of Khan's direction were wasted on a "formulaic, intermittently effective thriller". Rex Reed in the New York Observer saying it is "no masterpiece, but it is an accomplished debut", and Jeanette Catsoulis in The New York Times commenting "what this confident debut lacks in subtlety, it more than makes up in execution". Mark Kermode of The Observer reviewed the film giving it a rating of 2 out of 5 stars saying it "avoids worthiness but succumbs to melodrama".
