= When Winston Went to War with the Wireless =

2023 play by Jack Thorne

- Original language: English
- Written by: Jack Thorne
- Setting: 1926, London

Premiere
- Date: 13 June 2023
- Place: Donmar Warehouse; London

When Winston Went to War with the Wireless is a play by Jack Thorne about the BBC during the 1926 United Kingdom general strike.

== Production history ==
The play made its world premiere at the Donmar Warehouse, London on 13 June 2023, following previews from 2 June, running until 29 July, directed by Katy Rudd.

== Cast and characters ==
Character	London (2023)
Isabel Sheilds	Kitty Archer
John Reith	Stephen Campbell Moore
Archbishop of Canterbury/J.C.C. Davidson	Ravin J Ganatra
Stanley Baldwin	Haydn Gwynne
Muriel Reith	Mariam Haque
Ernest Bevin	Kevin McMonagle
Charlie Bowser/Engineer	Luke Newberry
Musician/Speaker of the house	Seb Philpott
Arthur Pugh/Musician	Elliott Rennie
Clemmie Churchill/Amelia Johnson	Laura Rogers
Peter Eckersley	Shubham Saraf
Winston Churchill	Adrian Scarborough

== Reception ==
The Guardian's Arifa Akbar gave the play three stars out of five, observing that "the story comes in fast, evocative scenes with dialogue delivering lots of information, entertainingly, but not with enough probing" and praised Rudd's direction while stating that "ultimately, we are not sure what the play is saying."

Writing for Time Out, Andrzej Lukowski also awarded the play three stars of five, claiming that it "never quite manages to live up to its intriguing concept" and calling it "an entertaining but flawed exercise in cakeism."

Sarah Crompton of WhatsOnStage.com gave the play four stars out of five, describing it as a "fleet and fluid production" and highlighting the performances of Campbell-Moore, Scarborough and Archer.
