= Shubham Saraf =

British actor

- Born: March 1992 (age 34); Calcutta, India
- Education: University of Warwick École Philippe Gaulier; Guildhall School of Music and Drama
- Occupation: Actor
- Years active: 2012–present

Shubham Saraf (born March 1992) is a British actor. He earned an Evening Standard Theatre Award nomination. On television, he is known for his roles in the Netflix crime anthology Criminal: UK (2019–), the BBC One drama A Suitable Boy (2020), and the Apple TV+ series Shantaram (2022). His films include Honour (2014).

== Early life ==
Saraf was born in Calcutta. He spent his early childhood in Mexico and Trinidad and Tobago, before moving to London when he was 7 or 8. He attended St Paul's School, London, where he acted in student productions. He graduated with a Bachelor of Science in Economics from the University of Warwick in 2013. He then spent a year with the École Philippe Gaulier in Paris before going on to graduate with a Bachelor of Arts in Acting from the Guildhall School of Music and Drama in 2017.

== Career ==
Saraf appeared in the 2014 films Honour and The Cut. He made his professional stage debut in 2017 as revolutionary Dinesh Gupta in Lions and Tigers at the Sam Wanamaker Playhouse. In 2018, he appeared in the BBC One political thriller Bodyguard as PR adviser Tahir Mahmood. He also had stage roles in a gender-swapped version of Hamlet at Shakespeare's Globe and An Adventure Bush Theatre.

The following year, Saraf began starring as Detective Constable Kyle Petit in the Netflix crime anthology Criminal: UK. He was in the main cast of the BBC One drama miniseries A Suitable Boy as Nawabzada Firoz Khan. He appeared in Three Sisters at the Almeida Theatre and Romeo and Juliet at the National Theatre. In 2022, Saraf starred as Prabhu Kharre in the Apple TV+ adaptation of Shantaram and played Nathuram Godse in The Father and the Assassin, also at the National, the latter of which earned Saraf an Evening Standard Theatre Award nomination.

== Filmography ==
=== Film ===
Year	Title	Role	Notes
2012	Suspension of Disbelief	Student	
2013	Miss	Man	Short film
2014	Honour	Adel	
2014	The Cut	Levon	
2016	Tape	Daniel Giulani	
2017	This Feels Fucking Weird		Short film
2018	Overlord	Hays	
2018	Shakespeare's Globe: Hamlet	Ophelia, Osric	Recording
2019	6 Underground	Man	
2020	Acrimonious	Caspar	Short film
2020	Bath Salts	Sham	Short film
2021	The Power	Junior Doctor	Zee5 film
2021	The Track	Harry	Short film
2023	Blind	Nikhil Saraf	JioCinema film
2023	The Dandies of Albertopolis	Julius	Short film
2027	Cliffhanger	TBA	Post-production

=== Television ===
Year	Title	Role	Notes
2013	Fresh Meat	Protester	1 episode
2018	Bodyguard	Tahir Mahmood	Recurring role (3 episodes)
2019–present	Criminal: UK	Kyle Petit	Main role (6 episodes)
2020	A Suitable Boy	Nawabzada Firoz Khan	Miniseries; main role (6 episodes)
2021	Romeo and Juliet	Benvolio	Television recording
2022	Shantaram	Prabaker "Prabhu" Kharre	Main role
2026	Star City	Manu Chadha	Recurring Role

== Stage ==
Year	Title	Role	Notes
2017	Lions and Tigers	Dinesh Gupta	Sam Wanamaker Playhouse, London
2018	Hamlet	Ophelia, Osric	Globe Theatre, London
2018	An Adventure	Rasik	Bush Theatre, London
2019	Three Sisters	Nikolay Tuzenbach	Almeida Theatre, London
2021	Romeo and Juliet	Benvolio	Royal National Theatre, London
2022	The Father and the Assassin	Nathuram Godse	Royal National Theatre, London
2023	When Winston Went to War with the Wireless	Peter Eckersley	Donmar Warehouse, London
2024	An Enemy of the People	Hovstad	Duke of York’s Theatre, London

== Awards and nominations ==
Year	Award	Category	Work	Result	Ref.
2022	Evening Standard Theatre Awards	Best Actor	The Father and the Assassin	Nominated	
