= Tom Crowe =

Irish radio host (1922–2010)

Tom Crowe (5 July 1922 – 6 December 2010) was an announcer on BBC Radio 3.

== Life ==
Crowe was raised in County Clare, Ireland and educated at St Columba's College, near Dublin. His studies for a degree at Trinity College, Dublin, where he read French and German Literature, were interrupted when he joined the British Army and served in the Irish Guards between 1944 and 1948.

He first joined the BBC's Third Programme in 1952 discovering his job was "simply a mouth opening and shutting in this tiny little studio in the double basement of Broadcasting House". He left in 1960, but returned in 1964 when attitudes were changing; the Third's announcers were now sharing office space with broadcasters from the Light Programme.

He wrote the biography of the Arabist Owen Tweedy titled Gathering Moss, published 1967. During the 1970s, he became one of the most familiar voices on Radio 3, and "an accident-prone but haughtily unflappable persona" evolved. Hans Keller recalled Crowe's "inspired" opening of the network in June 1971 with the words: "Good morning to you. It's seven O'clock I'm afraid". On another occasion, when the Greenwich Time Signal was accidentally heard over The Hebrides overture (aka, Fingal's Cave) he commented: "I do hope the Mendelssohn didn't spoil your enjoyment of the pips".

Crowe retired from the BBC in 1982. Later he worked for the South African Broadcasting Corporation where he presented a classical music programme for three months each year.

== Death ==
He died at his home in Pickering, North Yorkshire, England where he lived with his second wife, Elizabeth Cooper.
