= 2BE Belfast =

2BE
- Belfast; Northern Ireland
- Frequency: 689 kHz (initially)

Programming
- Format: News, information, entertainment

Ownership
- Owner: British Broadcasting Company, British Broadcasting Corporation

History
- First air date: September 15, 1924; 101 years ago

2BE was the call sign of the first official radio station to broadcast in Northern Ireland. Operated by the British Broadcasting Company (later the British Broadcasting Corporation), it started transmissions from Belfast on 15 September 1924 using a wavelength of 435 m (689 kHz). It was originally broadcast from Linenhall Street in Belfast.

On 20 March 1936 the Belfast transmitter was replaced by a new, more powerful transmitter broadcasting from Lisnagarvey on a wavelength of 307 m (977 kHz), the service having been renamed as the Northern Ireland Regional Programme on 6 January 1935.

With the resumption of regional broadcasting after World War II, this station became the Northern Ireland Home Service, and later BBC Radio 4 Northern Ireland. 2BE's successor station today is BBC Radio Ulster.

== See also ==
- BBC
- BBC Northern Ireland
- BBC Radio Ulster
