= Arthur Burrows (broadcaster) =

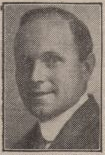
Burrows as depicted in the 12 October 1923 edition of The Radio Times

Arthur Richard Burrows FJI (15 February 1882 – 26 November 1947), known as "Uncle Arthur" to listeners, was one of the earliest employees of the British Broadcasting Company and was the first to hold the position of Director of Programmes. Burrows was previously a journalist who began his career on the Oxford Times newspaper, obtaining the post through the editor Claude Rippon. Burrows knew Rippon through the Oxford Camera Club; both were keen photographers.

Burrows was also a keen wireless enthusiast. Prior to joining the BBC he was in charge of the original experimental transmissions from Marconi House, the first 2LO station.

Arthur Burrows was a man of several British broadcasting 'firsts':

- At 6pm on 14 November 1922, he read the BBC's first-ever, on-air news bulletin.
- At 5pm on 24 December 1922, he played Father Christmas in the play 'The Truth About Father Christmas' – considered to be the first official broadcast of a radio drama.
- He was one of the original BBC 'Uncles' ('Uncle Arthur'), the first London wireless Uncle on Children's Hour.

At 2LO and the BBC, he was assisted by L. Stanton Jefferies - the latter's first Director of Music.

After the BBC, Burrows went on to be head of the International Wireless Bureau in Geneva.

He was a Fellow of the Institute of Journalists (FJI) (now the Chartered Institute of Journalists).

== Portrayals ==
In 2025 he was portrayed by Rory Kinnear in The Truth about Phyllis Twigg, an audio drama by Paul Kerensa about the making of 'The Truth About Father Christmas'. It was broadcast on BBC Radio 4.

== Bibliography ==
- BBC Programme Records 1922–1926.
- BBC Year Book 1930.
- The Story of Broadcasting, A.R. Burrows, 1924.
