= Savoy Place =

Building in the City of Westminster

Coordinates: 51°30′33″N 0°07′15″W

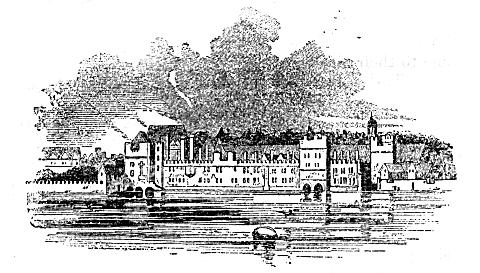
The former Savoy Palace

Savoy Place is a large red brick building on the north bank of the River Thames in the City of Westminster. It is on a street called Savoy Place; Savoy Hill and Savoy Street run along the sides of the building up to the Strand. In front is the Victoria Embankment, part of the Thames Embankment. Close by are Savoy Hill House (best known for accommodating the BBC Savoy Hill recording studios), the Savoy Hotel and Waterloo Bridge. There are commanding views over to the South Bank and the London Eye.

== History ==
Savoy Place is located at a site originally called Savoy Manor, taking its name from Peter II, Count of Savoy. He was given the land by Henry III on 12 February 1246 and built a palace on the site. After his death in 1268, the property was left to a French hospice. The Savoy Palace was extended by successive Earls of Lancaster and John of Gaunt, but was burnt down during the Peasants' Revolt of 1381. The palace was modified to become a prison in the 15th century.

In 1509, Henry VII left money in his will for a hospital. This was completed on the site in 1517 but it fell into decline and eventually became a military barracks and prison. Various religious institutions were based on the site, including a Jesuit school. The area was also a retreat for Huguenots families. In 1723, a German Lutheran church was built on part of the site, but demolished in 1877 for the construction of the Thames Embankment.

== Current building ==
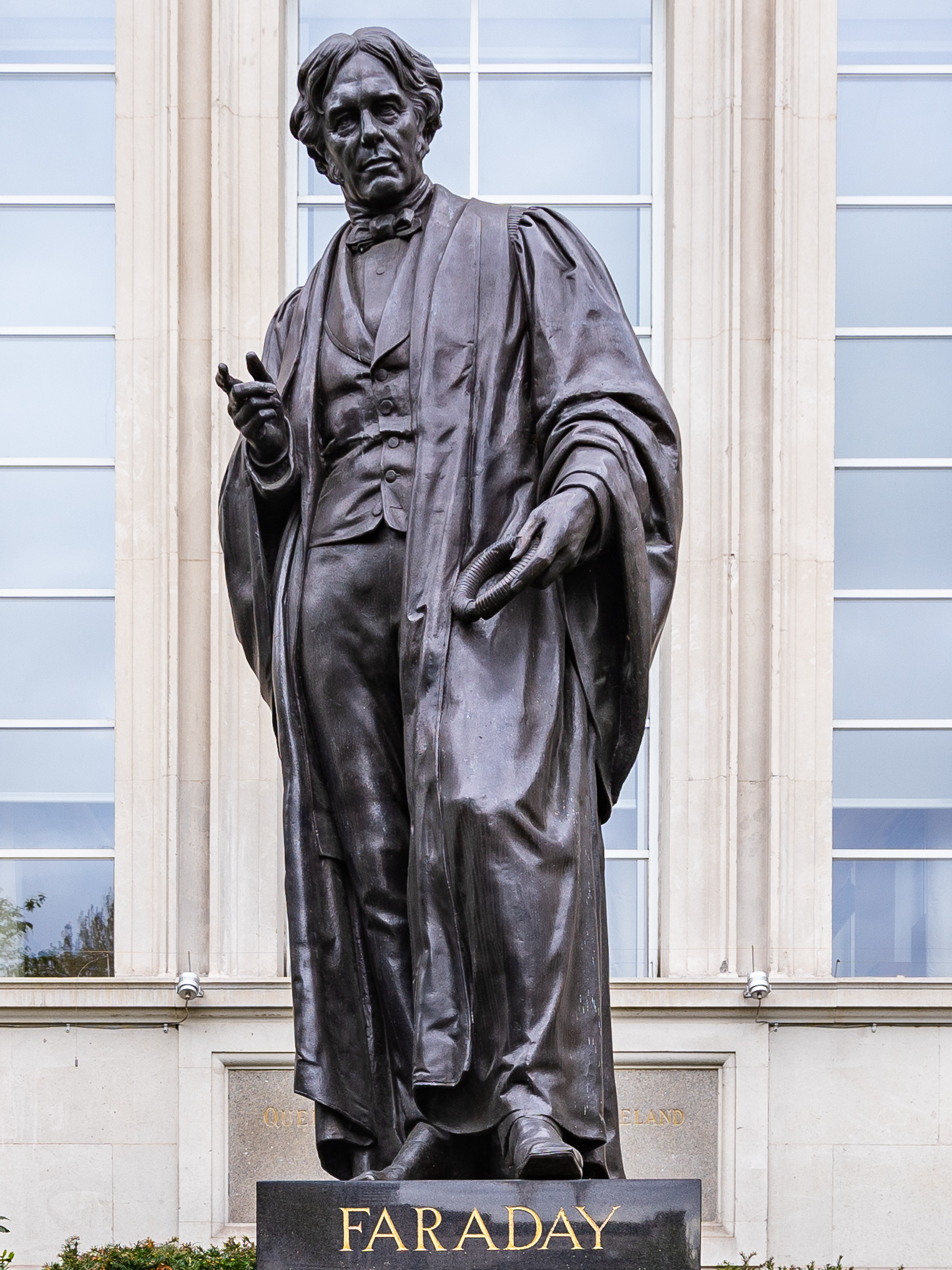
Statue of Michael Faraday

The current building, completed in 1889, was built to serve as an examination hall for the Royal College of Physicians and the Royal College of Surgeons. The foundation stone at the front of the building was laid by Queen Victoria on 24 March 1886.

On 1 June 1909, the Institution of Electrical Engineers bought the lease and various alterations were carried out by H. Percy Adams and Charles Holden. The building is currently the headquarters for the Institution of Engineering and Technology (IET), formed from the Institution of Electrical Engineers (IEE) and the Institution of Incorporated Engineers (IIE) in 2006.

Outside the building, there is a statue of the leading Victorian scientist Michael Faraday by the Irish sculptor John Henry Foley (1818–1874).

== Savoy Hill House ==
Behind Savoy Place is a building originally known as Lancaster House and later as Savoy Mansions. It was built in 1880 by the Savoy Building Company. Occupants included beer merchants, architects, solicitors, and even (between 1885 and 1921) Victorian Turkish baths in the basement. These were designed by C. J. Phipps, and were the first Turkish baths in London to be fitted with electric lighting.

In 1923, the newly created British Broadcasting Company (BBC) leased spare space for its Savoy Hill broadcasting studios with the transmissions taking place from Marconi House in the Strand. The original two studios were increased to nine until in 1932 the BBC left the premises when it moved to the larger purpose-built Broadcasting House. Savoy Hill was bought by the IEE in 1984 and is now known as Savoy Hill House.

== See also ==
- List of eponymous roads in London
- Savoy Chapel
- Savoy Theatre
