= 2MT =

British radio station

Coordinates: 51°43′51.9″N 0°25′59.6″E

2MT was the first British radio station to make regular entertainment broadcasts, and the "world's first regular wireless broadcast" for entertainment. Transmissions began on 14 February 1922 from an ex-Army hut next to the Marconi laboratories at Writtle, near Chelmsford in Essex. Initially the station only had 200 watts and transmitted on 700m (428 kHz) on Tuesdays from 20:00 to 20:30.

== History ==
Two Emma Toc (as it was called in the British Army Signalling Corps spelling alphabet of the day) was a surprising success. The presenter, producer, actor-manager and writer was Captain P. P. Eckersley, a Marconi engineer. His regular announcement; "This is Two Emma Toc, Writtle testing, Writtle testing", became in a short time quite well known.

Transmitter location shown within Essex

2MT led to the creation of its sister station 2LO, and subsequently the BBC. 2MT did not itself become part of the BBC and closed down on 17 January 1923.

Peter Eckersley went on to become the founding Chief Engineer at the British Broadcasting Company.

The Marconi Hut site at Writtle is commemorated by a nearby information board at Melba Court – named after Dame Nellie Melba who made Britain's first publicised entertainment broadcast from Marconi's New Street factory – unveiled in 1997 by Marconi's daughter Princess Elettra Marconi. The site was sold off and the land used for housing development in the 1990s.

A significant part of the original Writtle hut is now preserved at the Sandford Mill Museum of Science and Industry in North Chelmsford, where it forms part of a wireless and broadcasting historic exhibit.

== G2MT in 1983 ==
In 1983, the Marconi Company main site in Stanmore, London, found itself with an amateur radio club which applied for the call "2MT" to be issued. The UK authorities decided that they could not issue the call without the prefix "G" and so the Marconi Radio Society re-launched (G)2MT on the airwaves with many dignitaries present for the event.

The call has been used from then until 2004 when the Stanmore site was closed and moved to Capability Green, Luton, Bedfordshire, under the BAE Systems banner and which is now Selex Galileo. The call "G2MT" is not as well used, as the modern building construction has severely limited the possibilities of having a permanent transmitting station. However, occasionally, one of the Marconi Radio Society members will bring along mobile transmitting equipment and give people the chance to hear (G)2MT over the air once again.

== 2MT in 2001 ==
The 2MT call-sign has not been re-issued for regular use since 1922. However, in 2001, a special permit was given for it to be used to commemorate the 100th anniversary of the first wireless transmission across the Atlantic by Marconi in 1901. Details of this event can be found on the Chelmsford Amateur Radio Society (CARS) website.

== 2MT in 2017 ==
The 95th anniversary of 2MT was marked in February by amateur radio from the original hut and internet special events by a team effort of CARS with GB95-2MT, EmmaToc and Chelmsford Museum

== 2MT centenary in 2022 ==
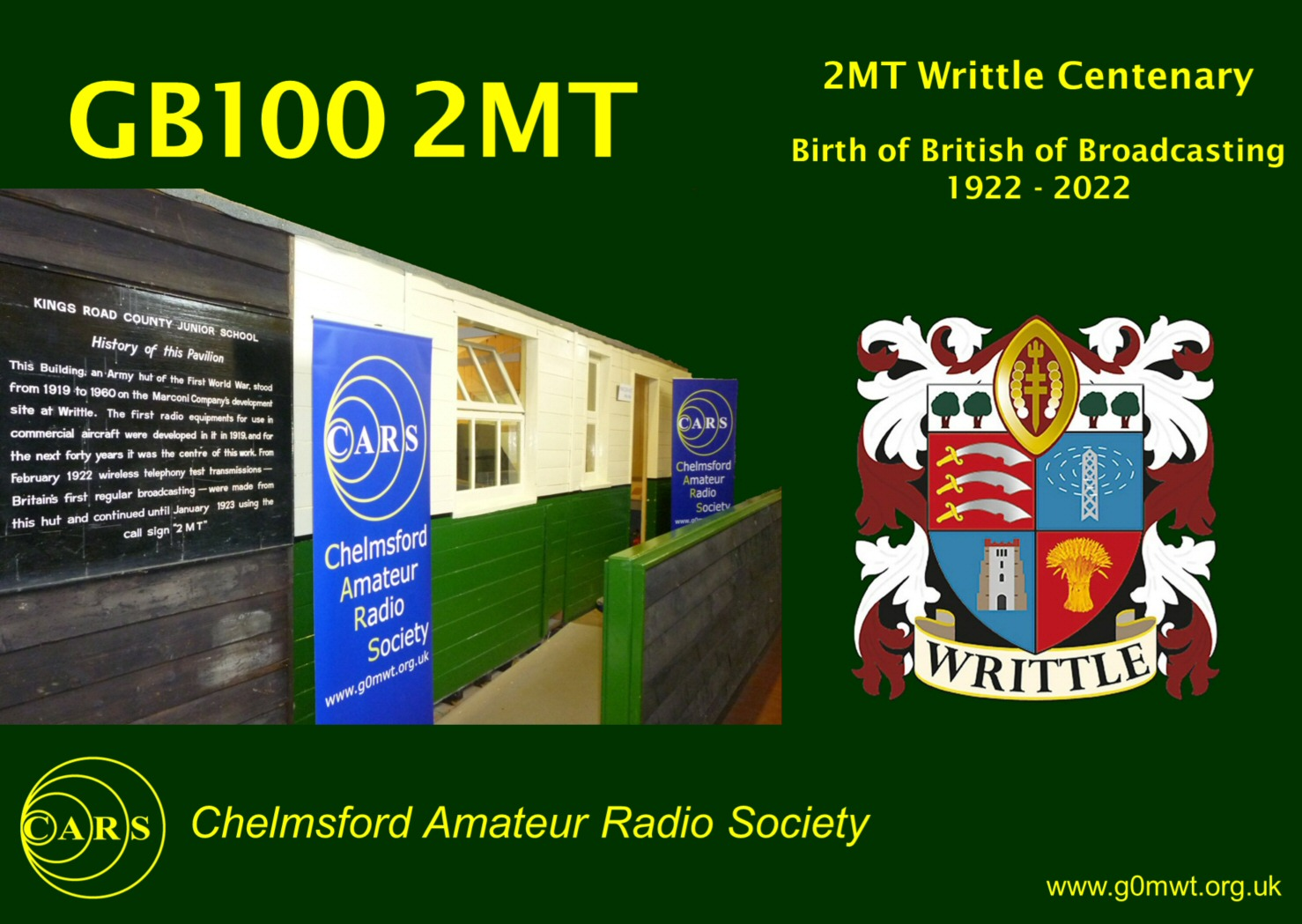
2MT Writtle Centenary Card

The centenary of 2MT was marked on 14 February 2022 by the village of Writtle and by amateur radio and internet special events, including by CARS with GB100-2MT and EmmaToc.

Mainstream media also marked the anniversary including articles in the Daily Express and iNews.
