= British Broadcasting Company =

British commercial radio broadcaster; predecessor to the BBC (1922–1926)

British Broadcasting Company Limited
- Type: Private company limited by shares
- Founded: 18 October 1922 (103 years ago)
- Defunct: 1 January 1927 (99 years ago) (4 years, 2 months and 14 days)
- Fate: Liquidation sale, re-established in 1927 as the non-commercial and crown-chartered British Broadcasting Corporation
- Successor: BBC
- Headquarters: United Kingdom

The British Broadcasting Company Limited (BBC) was the commercial forerunner to the public British Broadcasting Corporation and formed on 18 October 1922 by British and American electrical companies doing business in the United Kingdom. Licensed by the UK's General Post Office, its original office was located on the second floor of Magnet House, a GEC building in London, and consisted of a room and a small antechamber.

On 14 December 1922, John Reith was hired to become the managing director of the company at that address. The company later moved its offices to the premises of the Marconi Company. The BBC as a commercial broadcasting company did not sell air time but it did carry a number of sponsored programmes paid for by British newspapers. On 31 December 1926, the company was dissolved and its assets were transferred to the non-commercial and crown-chartered British Broadcasting Corporation.

== Brief history ==
=== Post Office stations ===
In Britain prior to 1922, the General Post Office (GPO) retained exclusive rights given to it by the government to manage and control all means of mass communication with the exception of the printed word. The laws which evolved into the Wireless Telegraphy Act 1947, upon which modern British communication laws were established, concerned:

- the establishment of a station for purposes of broadcasting,
- the use of a station for purposes of broadcasting,
- the installing of a transmitter or receiver, and the use of a transmitter or receiver.

All these activities require a government licence which was originally granted by the General Post Office.

=== "Electrical" post offices ===
The invention of the electrical telegraph came under the control of the Telegraph Act 1869 which was based upon a law that forbade the encoding of electrical cables with messages without a licence. The messages were viewed as electrical forms of a letter. This invention was followed by the wireless telegraphy which was then placed under the Wireless Telegraphy Act 1904.

=== Advent of wireless broadcasting ===
In the US, the development of the telegraph, wireless telegraph, telephone and wireless telephony proceeded according to the dictates of entrepreneurial commercial interests concerned only with supply and demand for profit. Beginning in August 1920, commercial broadcasting stations programming to the general public had begun broadcasting in the United States, licensed by the Department of Commerce (these duties were transferred in 1934 to the Federal Communications Commission) and offering several hours of programming, usually at night. Two of the first stations were WWJ in Detroit (then known as 8MK) and KDKA in Pittsburgh (which has claimed to be the first station specifically licensed for commercial broadcasting; however commercial licences were actually not awarded until September 1921). In France experimental broadcasts started in November 1921.

In the United Kingdom, all broadcasts were licensed by the GPO, who were reluctant to license any fully commercial stations and initially only 'experimental' stations were allowed on air.

=== First test broadcasts ===
Beginning in 1920, a number of licences were issued to British and American subsidiary companies in Britain for the purpose of conducting experimental transmissions under terms of a licence issued by the General Post Office in accordance with the Wireless Telegraphy Act 1904.

The managing director of the Marconi Wireless Telegraph Company, Godfrey Isaacs, decided to spearhead radio broadcasting and in January 1920 the firm based in Chelmsford, Essex completed installation of a long wave transmitter on 2750 meters (109 kilocycles/second) with a power of 6 kilowatts to conduct experimental broadcasts from the New Street Works. A license was granted on 23 February for two 30 minute broadcasts per day and on 15 June 1922 there was a famous performance by Dame Nellie Melba later followed by other well known artists of the time. The signal was received throughout Europe and as far as Newfoundland. Further transmissions were also made.

=== Military intervention ===
On 23 November 1920, the General Post Office halted all further transmissions due to complaints of alleged interference with military communications. As the number of wireless receiving sets increased during the early 1920s, the General Post Office came under extreme pressure from hobby listeners to allow the experimental wireless broadcasts to resume.

=== Test transmissions resume ===
On 14 February 1922, which was two years after ceasing their original transmissions, the Marconi Company was issued a licence for experimental transmissions under the call sign 2MT on a wavelength of 700 meters. Chief engineer Peter Eckersley, who later pushed for the development of longwave radio, was given charge of providing both the broadcast entertainment and the engineering. The station operated out of a hut in a field at Writtle near Chelmsford.

On 11 May 1922, the Marconi Company was issued another licence for experimental broadcasts from a station identified as 2LO which was located at Marconi House in The Strand, London. The programme consisted of a boxing commentary by W. Southey of the fight between Kid Lewis and Georges Carpentier. Further tests were also advertised as demonstrations of "Wireless Telegraphy and Telephony" which were "subject to permission from the Postmaster General". These demonstrations were performed by the "Demonstration Department (of) Marconi's London Wireless Station 2LO".

On 16 May 1922, the Metropolitan Vickers Company Ltd. ("Metrovick") with links to Westinghouse in the USA commenced test broadcasting from its own station in Manchester, call sign 2ZY.

=== The decision to create the BBC ===
Pressure was building from manufacturers and enthusiasts for regular scheduled radio broadcasting in Britain but the form in which it would take was highly contended.

In May a committee of representatives was appointed from the "Big Six" companies – the Marconi Company, Metropolitan-Vickers, Radio Communication Company, British Thomson-Houston, General Electric Company and Western Electric. The Post Office also pressed for the inclusion of a representative from the smaller firms manufacturing radio equipment in the UK – Frank Phillips of Burndept. George Campbell was one of the members on the committee.

In a 2018 peer-reviewed paper entitled "Marconi Proposes: Why it's time to rethink the birth of the BBC" the media historian David Prosser from The University of Bristol used newly discovered material to show that the case for public service broadcasting was made by Godfrey Isaacs (then managing director of the Marconi Company) in the meeting at the General Post Office on 18 May 1922.

According to Prosser "The 39 members of the wireless trade invited to the GPO's headquarters near St Pauls in London, on 18 May 1922 were keenly aware that the future of a new industry rested on their shoulders and that failure might mean, as one participant noted, this 'whole delightful enterprise which fascinates everybody and which promises good business, will end in a fizzle and disappointment'. This meeting is one of the most significant events in the history of British broadcasting and it took place behind closed doors."

A transcript of the meeting was thought to be lost and although its outcome, the creation of the licence fee funded British Broadcasting Company was clear, the deliberations were not known and an inaccurate assumption made that the Post Office had made the proposal.

"It is Godfrey Isaacs, the managing director of Marconi, who emerges from the pages of this transcript as the dominant force in the room. At Isaacs' suggestion, twenty companies indicated at the outset 'a desire to have licences". With broadcasting to be allowed in only eight cities, the challenges were evident during a lengthy discussion regarding mutual interference, transmitter power and how slots might be divided between the different broadcasting companies".

Of the wireless set manufacturers present at the meeting only one, Metropolitan Vickers whose parent was US firm Westinghouse disagreed with the proposal for a single non advertising-based entity, But Isaacs used his company's clout stating he didn't believe a 'transmitting station can be erected to work efficiently' without using Marconi patented technology, which he would only make available to his single scheme.

Prosser concludes, "We can identify the exact moment the BBC was conceived. It was not the Post Office that proposed the BBC, but Godfrey Isaacs of Marconi." Shortly after its creation in November 1922 Isaacs was made a director of the BBC and remained so until his death in 1925.

== Incorporation and shares ==
On 18 October 1922 the British Broadcasting Company Ltd. was incorporated under the Companies Acts 1908 to 1917 with a share capital of £60,006, with cumulative ordinary shares valued at £1 each. No further capital could be issued without the Postmaster-General's consent:

The shares were equally held by six companies:

- Marconi Company
- Metropolitan-Vickers
- Radio Communication Company
- British Thomson-Houston
- General Electric Company
- Western Electric

The shareholders gave the BBC the benefit of their respective patents, and only radio sets supplied by BBC companies were permitted to be licensed to receive programmes. The ability of the shareholders to profit from the BBC was limited as part of the agreement with the Postmaster General:

The holders of the Cumulative Ordinary Shares are entitled to receive out of the profits of the Company a fixed Cumulative Dividend at the rate of 7½% per annum on the capital for the time being paid up thereon but are not entitled to any further or other participation in profits.

=== Directors ===
Directors
| Name | Portfolio | Address |
|---|---|---|
| Jack Pease, 1st Baron Gainford | Chairman of British Broadcasting Company Limited | Headlam Hall, Gainford, Durham |
| Godfrey C. Isaacs | Managing director of Marconi's Wireless Telegraph Company Limited | Marconi House, Strand, WC2 |
| Archibald McKinstry | Joint managing director of Metropolitan Vickers Electrical Company Limited | The Red Lodge, Southill Avenue, Harrow on the Hill |
| Major Basil Binyon | Managing director of Radio Communication Company Limited | "Hawtthorndene", Hayes, Kent |
| John Gray | Chairman of the British Thomson-Houston Company Limited | "Beaulieu", Park Farm Road, Bromley, Kent |
| Sir William Noble | Director of The General Electric Company Limited | Magnet House, Kingsway, London WC2 |
| Henry Mark Pease | Managing director of Western Electric Company Limited | 18 Kensington Court Mansions, London W8 |

The initial remit of the British Broadcasting Company Limited was to establish a nationwide network of radio transmitters many of which had originally been owned by member companies, from which the BBC was to provide a national broadcasting service.

=== International influences ===
The British Broadcasting Company was formed using a blueprint that the United States Navy and the General Electric Company had attempted to institute in the USA. Early in World War I, all of the ship-to-shore and transatlantic radio stations controlled by a US subsidiary company of Marconi's Wireless Telegraph Company, Limited in Chelmsford, England, were seized and handed to the US Navy for the duration of the War. After the War, the US Congress forced the US Navy to divest itself of the stations and they turned to the General Electric Company which in 1919 formed a subsidiary called the Radio Corporation of America. With the US Navy on its board, RCA then absorbed the former Marconi stations. In 1926 RCA created the National Broadcasting Company, the first network in the United States. Peaking in the 1930s, there were unsuccessful attempts to bring all radio communications in America back under single monopoly control by using the patent laws.

The Western Electric Company Ltd. in the UK was originally formed as a subsidiary of American Telephone and Telegraph Company (AT&T) in the USA where it served as its manufacturing subsidiary to equip the AT&T Bell Telephone system.

The British Thomson-Houston Company Ltd. was a controlled UK subsidiary of the General Electric Company in the USA. The Hotpoint Electric Appliance Company Ltd. was formed by British Thomson-Houston (BTH) in 1921.

The only other company later added to the original shareholders of the British Broadcasting Company Ltd. was Burndept Limited. It represented the interests of over twenty small electrical manufacturers in the UK.

=== Income ===
The British Broadcasting Company did not sell air time for commercials but its licence did allow for it to carry sponsored programming, and eight such sponsored broadcasts were aired in 1925. However, the main source of its income was from the sale of radio receiving sets and transmitters manufactured by its shareholding member companies as well as from a portion of the government (GPO) licence fee that had to be purchased by BBC listeners.

== Timeline ==
=== 1922 ===
- 14 February: 2MT is the first British radio station to make regular entertainment broadcasts, operating from an ex-Army hut next to the Marconi Laboratories at Writtle, near Chelmsford in Essex.
- 11 May: 2LO begins broadcasting for one hour a day from the seventh floor of Marconi House in London's Strand, opposite Somerset House.
- 18 October: The British Broadcasting Company Limited is formed but not registered.
- 1 November: The first broadcast receiving licences are issued.
  - 14 November: 2LO is transferred to the British Broadcasting Company and begins broadcasting on medium wave from Marconi House to London. The first news bulletin is read by Arthur Burrows, the company's founding Director of Programmes.
  - 15 November: 5IT in Birmingham and 2ZY in Manchester begin broadcasting. All three BBC stations broadcast the general election results.
- 14 December: John C. W. Reith is hired as the company's managing director.
  - 15 December: The British Broadcasting Company Limited is registered as an incorporated company.
  - 24 December: 5NO begins broadcasting to Newcastle.
  - 30 December: John Reith begins work as managing director.
  - 31 December: 35,774 receiving licences have been issued by the General Post Office. The BBC has four employees.

=== 1923 ===
- 18 January: Postmaster General Neville Chamberlain issues the British Broadcasting Company Ltd. with a broadcasting licence from the General Post Office.
- 13 February: 5WA begins broadcasting to Cardiff.
- 6 March: 5SC begins broadcasting to Glasgow.
  - 16 March: The first return of shareholders is filed. Substantiated claim.
- 1 May: New studios are opened at Savoy Hill.
- 6 June: Edgar Wallace becomes the first British radio sports reporter when he makes a report on The Derby.
- 29 August: The first network news bulletin is delivered by all BBC stations.
- 28 September: First published edition of The Radio Times.
- 1 October: Publication of Sykes Committee Report on Broadcasting.
  - 10 October: 2BD begins broadcasting to Aberdeen.
  - 17 October: 6BM begins broadcasting to Bournemouth.
- 16 November: 6FL begins broadcasting to Sheffield as the first relay station.
  - 26 November: First experimental broadcast to North America.
- 30 December: First landline relay from Radiola Paris, France.
  - 31 December: First broadcast of the Big Ben chimes. BBC staff numbers 177.

=== 1924 ===
- 5 February: First daily broadcast of the Greenwich Time Signal.
  - 17 February: First daily broadcast of the Big Ben time signal.
- 28 March 5PY begins broadcasting to Plymouth as a relay station.
- 1 May: 2EH begins broadcasting to Edinburgh as a relay station.
- 11 June: 6LV begins broadcasting to Liverpool as a relay station.
- 8 July: 2LS begins broadcasting to Leeds and Bradford as a relay station.
  - 9 July: 5XX begins experimental broadcasts on long wave from Chelmsford.
- 15 August: 6KH began broadcasting to Hull as a relay station.
- 15 September: 2BE begins broadcasting to Belfast.
  - 16 September: 5NG begins broadcasting to Nottingham as a relay station.
- 21 October: 6ST begins broadcasting to Stoke-on-Trent as a relay station.
- 12 November: 2DE begins broadcasting to Dundee as a relay station.
  - 26 November: First transatlantic relay broadcast from KDKA, Pittsburgh, Pennsylvania, USA.
- 12 December: 5SX begins broadcasting to Swansea as a relay station.
  - 31 December: Over 1 million receiving licences have been issued by the General Post Office. The BBC has 20 radio transmitting stations in operation and 465 employees.

=== 1925 ===
- Various dates: Eight sponsored concerts are broadcast by the BBC.
- 3 April: BBC Deputy Managing Director Rear-Admiral Charles Carpendale becomes President of the First General Assembly of the International Broadcasting Union at Geneva, Switzerland.
  - 6 April: 2LO's transmitter power is increased with the move from Marconi House to the roof of Selfridges department store in Oxford Street.
- 17 July: First published edition of The Radio Supplement.
  - 27 July: The 5XX experimental longwave station is moved from Chelmsford to Daventry where it commences regular broadcasting on 1600 metres.
- 31 December: BBC staff numbers reach 658.

=== 1926 ===
- 4 January: John Reith begins to impose his dress code on the BBC's radio announcers, who must wear dinner jackets in the evening, as a mark of respect towards performers obliged to dress formally.
  - 16 January: Catholic priest and broadcaster Father Ronald Knox broadcasts Broadcasting from the Barricades, a satirical news report of a fictional riot. A significant part of the public believes the programme to be genuine, and Knox's satire provokes a minor panic similar to that caused by Orson Welles's The War of the Worlds broadcast twelve years later.
- 5 March: The Crawford parliamentary committee publishes its broadcasting report, which calls for the takeover of the British Broadcasting Company Ltd. by a government-owned non-commercial British Broadcasting Commission.
- 18 June: The BBC's Radio Supplement publication is replaced by its new periodical, World Radio.
- 22 July: Final return of shareholders filed.
- 14 November: The International Broadcasting Union publishes its Geneva Plan, which reduces the number of BBC wavelengths. This forces the company to move towards a restructuring of its services which will see most of its local radio stations replaced by regional stations.
- 16 December: Over 100 staff and directors of the British Broadcasting Company Limited attend a dinner party given for Prime Minister Stanley Baldwin.
  - 20 December: Publication of the royal charter and licence agreements creating the British Broadcasting Corporation.
  - 31 December: The General Post Offices has issued 2¼ million receiving licences. The contracts of 773 British Broadcasting Company staff are terminated and, with the dissolution of the company, shareholders are paid at par value. All assets, plant and copyrights held by the British Broadcasting Company are transferred to the Postmaster General.

=== 1927 ===
- 1 January: The British Broadcasting Corporation is established, and all assets received by the Postmaster General from the British Broadcasting Company Limited are transferred. John Reith takes office as the first director general, and all staff previously employed by the company are engaged under new contracts to the corporation.

== See also ==
- Radio Drama Company, a BBC company of actors established in 1939

== Sources ==
=== Bibliography ===
- Gilder, Eric (2003). Mass Media Moments in the United Kingdom, the USSR and the USA. Romania: Lucian Blaga University of Sibiu Press. ISBN 973-651-596-6.
  This book contains historical background relating to the British Broadcasting Company Ltd., its founding companies; their transatlantic connections; General Post Office licensing system; commercial competitors from Europe prior to World War II and offshore during the 1960s.
- Briggs, Asa (1985). The BBC – The First Fifty Years. Oxford: Oxford University Press. ISBN 0-19-212971-6.
  The first two lengthy chapters of this book cover in detail the BBC's history prior to the creation of the British Broadcasting Corporation in 1927.
- Parker, Derek (1977). Radio: The Great Years. Newton Abbot: David & Charles. ISBN 0-7153-7430-3.
  Contains a full page readable reproduction of the first edition of the Radio Times, 28 September 1923. The lead article is by Arthur R. Burrows, Director of Programmes for the British Broadcasting Company Ltd. His headline asks: "What's in the air?"
  * Burrows, Arthur R. (28 September 1923). "What's in the air?". Radio Times. Vol. 1, no. 1. London: British Broadcasting Company. p. 1. Archived from the original on 4 April 2017.
  Its stations are listed as serving "London, Cardiff, Birmingham, Newcastle, Manchester, Glasgow." An article by Peter Eckersley promises to inform readers about "Simultaneous Broadcasting."
  * Eckersley, Peter P. (28 September 1923). "What are the wild waves saying? The troubles of simulateous broadcasting". Radio Times. Vol. 1, no. 1. London: British Broadcasting Company. p. 19. Archived from the original on 8 January 2018.
- Curran, Charles (1972). "The First Fifty Years". BBC Handbook 1973. London: British Broadcasting Corporation.
- Coase, Ronald (1950). British Broadcasting, A Study in Monopoly. Cambridge, MA: Harvard University Press.
- Eckersley, Peter P. (1941). The Power Behind the Microphone. London: Jonathan Cape.
  Peter Eckersley was hired as Chief Engineer by the British Broadcasting Company Ltd.
- Reith, John (1924). Broadcast Over Britain. London: Hodder and Stoughton.
- Briggs, Asa (1961). The History of Broadcasting in the United Kingdom: Volume I – The Birth of Broadcasting. Oxford: Oxford University Press.
  Sponsorship of programmes by the British Broadcasting Company: See page 189 for details of eight sponsored concerts during 1925 by the Evening Standard, News of the World, Daily Herald, Weekly Dispatch, Answers and Titbits. The sponsorship consisted of these publications advertising in print the fact that their concerts were being broadcast by the BBC which at that time could not afford to produce its own concert programmes that would match the standard of those produced by the newspaper sponsors.
- Clark, Lorne (2010). Shareholders of the British Broadcasting Company. BVWS Books. ISBN 978-0-9547043-6-0.
