= Peter Eckersley (engineer) =

Engineer and pioneer of British broadcasting (1892–1963)

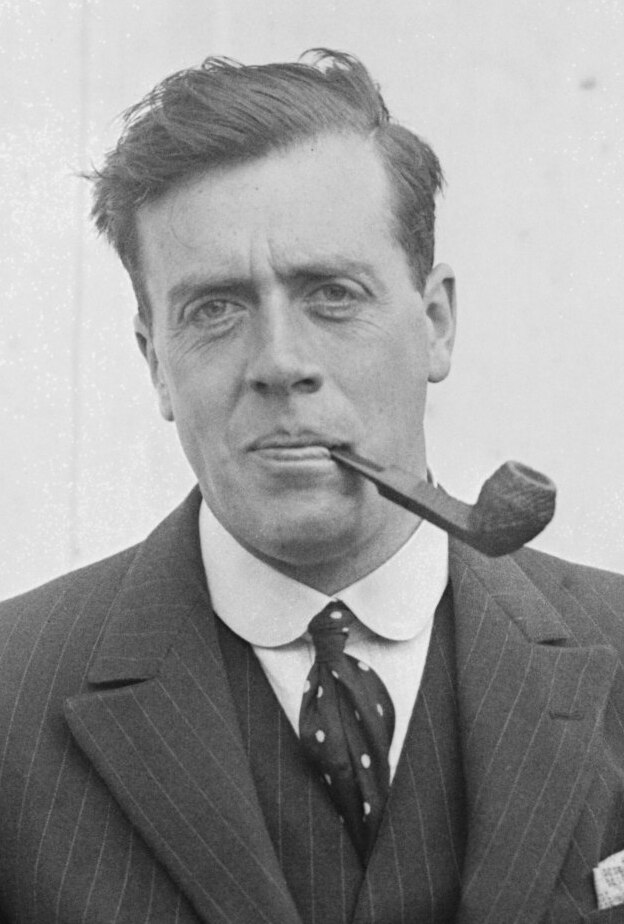
- Eckersley in 1924
- Born: Peter Pendleton Eckersley; 6 January 1892; Puebla, Mexico
- Died: 18 March 1963 (aged 71); Hammersmith, London, England
- Relatives: Thomas Eckersley (brother); Aldous Huxley (cousin)

Peter Pendleton Eckersley (6 January 1892 – 18 March 1963) was a pioneer of British broadcasting, the first chief engineer of the British Broadcasting Company Limited from 1922 to 1927 and chief engineer of the British Broadcasting Corporation until 1929.

== Early life ==
Peter Eckersley was born in Puebla, Mexico, in 1892. His father, Alfred (d. 1895 of yellow fever), was a railway engineer then in charge of building the Grand Mexican Railway. His elder brother was the physicist Thomas Eckersley; and his cousin, Aldous Huxley. In the 1911 census, he is recorded as a resident of the Bedales School-Co-Educational Proprietary Boarding School, Petersfield, Hampshire.

He attended Manchester Municipal College of Technology in 1912. He joined the Royal Flying Corps as a wireless equipment officer in 1915, where he obtained the rank of captain. He was stationed mainly in Egypt and at Salonika. Later in the War, he was sent to the Wireless Experimental Station at Biggin Hill where he conducted experimental work on duplex telephony for aircraft.

He Joined Marconi's Wireless Telegraph Co as the Head of the Experimental Section, Aircraft Department where he designed the Croydon Airport ground station transmitter.

== 1920 to 1929 ==
By 1920 Eckersley had become an announcer, broadcaster (he recited poetry and sang songs) and engineer of 2MT, the first licensed radio station in Britain, located in Writtle, near Chelmsford, Essex, England, where Guglielmo Marconi had built his wireless telegraphy factories. He was the first chief engineer of the British Broadcasting Company Limited from 1922 to 1927 and then chief engineer of the British Broadcasting Corporation.

Between World War I and World War II the General Electric Company of the United States became a giant cartel which had growing commercial interests in Britain and several not entirely successful steps were undertaken to prevent the Americanisation of Britain. Links between the UK and US had been pioneered by Marconi's Wireless Telegraph Company. During World War I General Electric, with help from the US Navy, had taken over the ship-to-shore radio business Marconi had established in America. In 1919 this was transferred to a new GE subsidiary, the Radio Corporation of America. The British military declared a two-year moratorium on further commercial radio experiments by Marconi's employees.

In 1922 the General Post Office agreed to license one commercial monopoly, to be known as the British Broadcasting Company, which would derive some income from a broadcast receiver licence and the rest from the manufacture and sale of receiving sets. Under the terms of the exclusive licence, the company could not sell air time. In 1923 Major-General Sir Frederick Sykes headed a committee to review this arrangement, which concluded that the GPO should stop licensing the British Broadcasting Company. It went out of business in December 1926. In 1927 the British Crown granted a charter to a non-commercial British Broadcasting Corporation and the GPO licensed this. John Reith was appointed to take control of the Crown corporation.

In 1925, Eckersley was made 'Life Vice-President' of the Radio Society of Great Britain, along with Major Basil Binyon (a BBC director).

== Dorothy "Dolly" Clark, later Eckersley ==
In 1929 Eckersley began an affair with Dorothy "Dolly" Clark, estranged wife of the BBC programme planner and conductor Edward Clark, and then divorced his own wife. Lord Reith, a deeply religious man, forced him out of his job. Dolly had separated from Edward Clark in 1925 and arranged for Eckersley to visit Germany on BBC business with Dolly to accompany him. Although they made no secret of their liaison, his wife Stella was unaware of it until Reith's wife Muriel broke the news to her.

Top-level conferences were held and even the Archbishop of Canterbury was consulted but Eckersley was not sacked immediately as he undertook to end the affair with Dolly Clark and return to his wife. But he and Dolly reunited and he resigned in April 1929. The affair prompted a public enquiry into the BBC's personnel practices. The couple were married on 25 October 1930.

Dolly was pro-Nazi in her politics, an admirer of Adolf Hitler, a friend of William Joyce and Unity Mitford and a member of Arnold Leese's Imperial Fascist League.

After Eckersley met Sir Oswald Mosley he became involved in his New Party, chairing its London Central Committee. From November 1939 the transmitter he had arranged to put in place at Osterloog transmitting station, was used for William Joyce's broadcasts to Britain and Europe. Eckersley has been described as "at best a foolish Fascist fellow traveller and at worst a traitor." Dolly joined Mosley's British Union of Fascists, outdoing Mosley in her enthusiasm for Nazism, and also the National Socialist League founded by William Joyce after he was expelled by Mosley for being too anti-semitic.

== 1930 onwards ==
For a time Eckersley was engaged in working to build a broadcasting station based in continental Europe which could be received in the United Kingdom. Captain Leonard Plugge, who became a Member of Parliament, also set about building his own International Broadcasting Company by leasing transmitters in France and other countries to beam commercial radio into Britain. The venture was very successful and, because Reith had banned Sunday light entertainment on the BBC, the IBC stations gained as much as 80 per cent of the Sunday listening audience by 1938.

Meanwhile, Peter Eckersley had sought other ways to bring the signals of the IBC stations into the living rooms of Britain. Rather than relying upon a receiving set licensed by the General Post Office, he began to wire parts of England for an early form of cable radio but was stopped by the intervention of the GPO. The IBC stations were eventually silenced when Adolf Hitler's troops captured the transmitters. From 1937 onwards Peter Eckersley worked for British Military Intelligence MI6 to help combat propaganda coming from Nazi Germany with British propaganda stations. He was turned down for war work.

The Eckersleys took holidays in Germany a number of times and attended the Nuremberg rallies of 1937 and 1938. They appear to have separated between then and the start of World War II. Dolly worked for the German broadcasting service during the war (as did James Clark, her teenage son by her first husband Edward Clark), and recruited William Joyce. Dorothy and James were tried in 1945 for providing support to the enemy: she was sent to prison for a year and James was bound over for two years. She died in 1971.

In his 1941 book The Power Behind the Microphone, he provided a visionary account of on-demand television : "I see the interior of a living-room … flush against the wall there is a translucent screen with numbered strips of lettering running across it. The lettering spells out titles which read like newspaper headlines. These are the titles describing the many different “broadcasting” programmes which can be heard by just pressing the corresponding button …".

Peter Eckersley died, aged 71, on 18 March 1963 at the West London Hospital in Hammersmith.

== In popular culture ==
Eckersley was featured prominently in Jack Thorne's 2023 play When Winston Went to War with the Wireless, played by Shubham Saraf.

== Published work ==
- Eckersley, P.P. (1941). The Power Behind the Microphone. London, Jonathan Cape.
- Eckersley, Myles, Prospero's Wireless, Myles Books 1997, ISBN 0-9531625-0-8, A biography of Peter Pendleton Eckersley - pioneer of radio and the art of broadcasting.
