= Marconi House =

Grade II listed building in London, England

Coordinates: 51°30′43.18″N 0°7′6.18″W

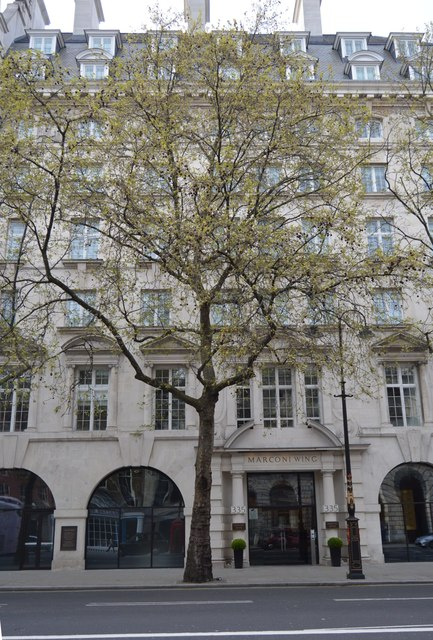
Marconi House in 2016

Marconi House is a Grade II listed building at 335 Strand (at its junction with Aldwych) in London.

It was originally built as a hotel and restaurant in 1904, designed by Norman Shaw, to serve the Gaiety Theatre next door. It then became the headquarters of the Marconi Companies from the week of May 12, 1912 to 1933 and later as the offices of English Electric.

It was from studios on the seventh floor (in 1922 and 1923) that the first radio programmes from the London Broadcasting Station 2LO were broadcast and it was later used as the headquarters for the Ministry of Civil Aviation, before English Electric returned in 1950.

The building has since been converted for residential use by Galliard Homes.
