= Writtle =

Village in Essex, England

Coordinates: 51.729°N 0.427°E

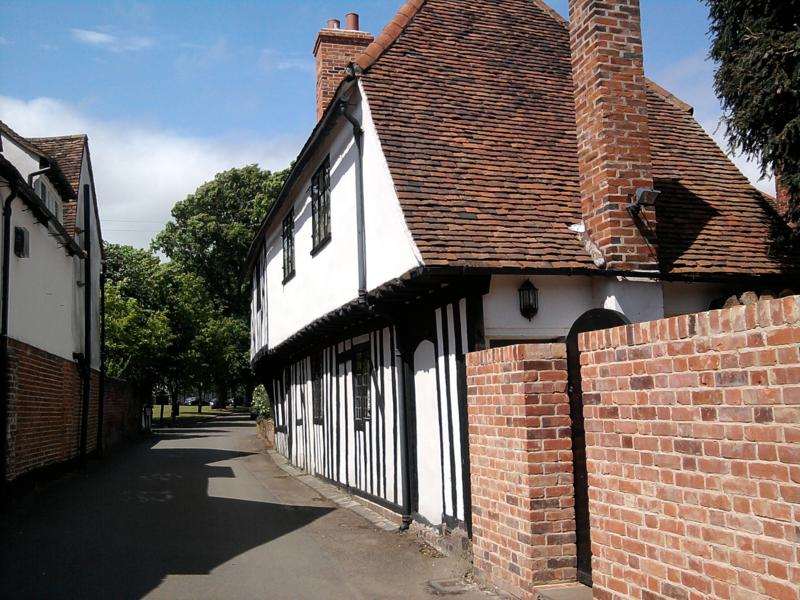
- Aubyns, a half-timbered house dated 1500

- Location within Essex
- Population: 5,328 (Parish, 2021)
- OS grid reference: TL6706
- Civil parish: Writtle
- District: Chelmsford
- Shire county: Essex
- Region: East
- Country: England
- Sovereign state: United Kingdom
- Post town: CHELMSFORD
- Postcode district: CM1
- Dialling code: 01245
- Police: Essex
- Fire: Essex
- Ambulance: East of England
- UK Parliament: North West Essex

Writtle is a village and civil parish in the Chelmsford district of Essex, England. It lies 2 miles (3.2 km) west of the centre of Chelmsford. It has a traditional village green complete with duck pond and a Norman church, and was once described as "one of the loveliest villages in England, with a ravishing variety of ancient cottages". The village is now home to Writtle University College, one of the UK's oldest and largest land-based colleges and a partner institution of the University of Essex, the grounds of which once housed a Royal hunting lodge, later the possession of the De Brus and De Bohun families. At the 2021 census the parish had a population of 5,328.

Writtle is sometimes claimed to be the birthplace of Robert the Bruce, as well as his father Robert de Brus, 6th Lord of Annandale. The claim is contested, but both men are known to have owned the manor of Writtle. From 1996 until 2017 Writtle hosted the annual southern V Festival within the grounds of Sir John Comyn's Hylands Park.

== History ==
The Romans were present in Writtle shortly after the Roman conquest by Claudius, but the presence of a metalled road, numerous archaeological finds and the ease with which the river can be forded in Writtle are still not significant enough evidence to suggest that Writtle, rather than Chelmsford, was the site of the Roman town of Caesaromagus, as suggested by the Essex historian Philip Morant (et al.).

The place-name 'Writtle' is first attested in the Domesday Book of 1086, where it appears as Writelam. It appears in a charter circa 1136 as Writela. This was originally the name of the River Wid, as attested in an Anglo-Saxon charter of 692 where the river appears as Writolaburna. This name is thought to mean 'babbling burn or brook'.

Named in the Little Domesday Book as a Royal demesne (manor) of 194 households, the village boasts the site of one of King John's hunting lodges (circa 1210), sited within the grounds of the present HE institution Writtle College.

The estate and village were later a possession of Isabel de Brus (Bruce), via a 16 October 1241 grant of Henry III and a known residence of her grandson Robert, father to the future king. For a time thereafter it was leased to a Francis and Joan Bache, but the estate was taken by Isabel's great-grandson, Robert The Bruce, King of Scots, in the 1320s. It was in Writtle in 1302 that Robert had married his second wife, Elizabeth de Burgh; there is some evidence to suggest he was also born in the village rather than in Turnberry Castle, but the story is possibly conflated with that of his father of the same name.

Another well known historic figure who lived in Writtle was Sir John Petre (1549–1613). He sat as a member of parliament for Essex from 1584 to 1587 and also served as Lord Lieutenant of Essex. In 1603 he was raised to the peerage as Baron John Petre, the first baron of Writtle. Baron Petre publicly acknowledged that he was a Roman Catholic and refused to follow the Church of England during the time of Queen Elizabeth I and King James I. He died in October 1613, aged 63, and was succeeded in the barony by his son William, who later married Katherine Somerset. One person from Writtle who did help to bring about the English Reformation was John Bastwick (1593–1654), a religious zealot who opposed Roman Catholic ceremonial in the years before the outbreak of the English Civil War.

In August 1914 the 4th Battalion of the Oxfordshire and Buckinghamshire Light Infantry Regiment arrived in Writtle. The 4th Ox and Bucks Bn was part of the Territorial Force, or volunteer reserve, of the British Army. While in Writtle the men underwent physical and military training. On 14 October 1914 they paraded in the grounds of Hylands House in the presence of King George V. The Ox and Bucks left Writtle in April 1915.

According to a contemporary newspaper report Writtle was hit by a V-2 rocket on Friday 12 January 1945. The V-2 fell about 200 yards south of the River Wid bridge in a field belonging to Skeggs Farm. The impact crater was 30 feet across by 20 feet deep. 19 properties were extensively damaged and a further 218 slightly damaged including All Saints' Church. No casualties were reported, although two families in Bridge Street were made homeless.

== Population ==
The population of the parish in 2021 was 5,328. The population declined between 2001 and 2021; it had been 5,383 in 2011, and 5,632 in 2001.

== Climate ==
Writtle has a mild variety of the British oceanic climate with warm summers at around 23 °C (73 °F) and mild winters with highs of 8 °C (46 °F) but with quite common minor frosts. Precipitation is relatively low by British standards at 586.3 millimetres (23.08 in) during the 1991–2020 average period.

Climate data for Writtle (1991–2020 normals, extremes 1959-present)
Month	Jan	Feb	Mar	Apr	May	Jun	Jul	Aug	Sep	Oct	Nov	Dec	Year
Record high °C (°F)	15.7 (60.3)	18.4 (65.1)	22.8 (73.0)	27.0 (80.6)	32.7 (90.9)	36.4 (97.5)	39.1 (102.4)	35.7 (96.3)	32.3 (90.1)	28.6 (83.5)	18.7 (65.7)	16.6 (61.9)	39.1 (102.4)
Mean daily maximum °C (°F)	7.8 (46.0)	8.4 (47.1)	11.1 (52.0)	14.3 (57.7)	17.5 (63.5)	20.7 (69.3)	23.3 (73.9)	23.0 (73.4)	19.7 (67.5)	15.3 (59.5)	10.9 (51.6)	8.2 (46.8)	15.0 (59.0)
Daily mean °C (°F)	4.8 (40.6)	5.0 (41.0)	6.9 (44.4)	9.2 (48.6)	12.3 (54.1)	15.3 (59.5)	17.7 (63.9)	17.6 (63.7)	14.8 (58.6)	11.3 (52.3)	7.5 (45.5)	5.1 (41.2)	10.7 (51.3)
Mean daily minimum °C (°F)	1.8 (35.2)	1.6 (34.9)	2.8 (37.0)	4.2 (39.6)	7.1 (44.8)	10.0 (50.0)	12.2 (54.0)	12.2 (54.0)	9.8 (49.6)	7.3 (45.1)	4.1 (39.4)	2.0 (35.6)	6.3 (43.3)
Record low °C (°F)	−17.8 (0.0)	−13.8 (7.2)	−11.1 (12.0)	−6.2 (20.8)	−2.8 (27.0)	−1.7 (28.9)	2.2 (36.0)	0.6 (33.1)	−1.1 (30.0)	−6.7 (19.9)	−8.1 (17.4)	−18.0 (−0.4)	−18.0 (−0.4)
Average precipitation mm (inches)	54.1 (2.13)	42.5 (1.67)	35.5 (1.40)	38.6 (1.52)	43.6 (1.72)	49.1 (1.93)	44.4 (1.75)	51.5 (2.03)	47.3 (1.86)	62.7 (2.47)	60.5 (2.38)	56.4 (2.22)	586.3 (23.08)
Average precipitation days (≥ 1.0 mm)	10.7	9.4	8.2	8.5	7.7	7.7	8.0	8.3	7.8	10.6	10.5	11.2	108.5
Mean monthly sunshine hours	58.4	75.9	121.0	173.0	203.3	206.1	216.6	203.9	154.0	111.2	68.3	52.0	1,643.9
Source 1: Met Office
Source 2: Starlings Roost Weather

== Two Emma Toc, Writtle ==
Writtle holds a distinguished place in the history of radio broadcasting. In the early 1920s it was the site of the experimental Marconi station 2MT ("Two Emma Toc"), from where Captain Peter Eckersley made the name of the village famous with his station announcement "this is Two Emma Toc, Writtle testing, Writtle testing".

The prefabricated hut from which the broadcast was made (constructed for use during the First World War, but never shipped to the war zone) was later relocated to King's Road primary school in Chelmsford, and has now been re-erected with replica equipment at the Sandford Mill museum, near Sandon. The Writtle transmission station was also the last independent outside the BBC, suspending transmission in January 1923. Independent radio did not re-emerge in the UK till the 1960s.

== Writtle Church ==
The Domesday Book of 1086 mentioning a church and priest in Writtle suggests that Christian worship in the village pre-dated the Norman Conquest; the early-13th-century nave and chancel seem to be extensions of an 11th-century construction, which itself replaced a Saxon church.

During the medieval period, the church "changed hands" several times, revenues being received by the Prior of Bermondsey in the 12th century, and then by the Hospital of the Holy Ghost in Rome from the early 13th; the turbulent reign of Richard II saw the church being seized by the king, eventually coming under the control of William of Wykeham's New College, Oxford in 1399.

The church has twice suffered arson attacks in recent history, the first in 1974, the second in 1991.

== Writtle Forest ==
Writtle Forest was a Royal Forest. The legal area of the forest - the area to which Forest Law applied - corresponded to the large ancient parish of Writtle, but the physical forest, the area of wood and commons was much smaller, and located in the still well wooded high ground in the south of the parish, stretching from College Wood to Edney Common. The Forest included hermitage called Bedemansburg, founded by King Stephen in the 1100s, and a Deer Park which was in place some time before 1237.

The woods (such as Great and Little Stoneymoor Woods) and plains (Mill Green) that lay south of the Writtle parish boundary, resembled the Forest but were not part of it.

== Longmeads House ==
Longmeads House is a large Victorian building with grounds, and an important feature of the village. It was built by Robert Woodhouse in the 1880s and remained in the family until it was acquired by the Seabrooke family in 1930. The estate was acquired by Essex County Council in 1950 and had been the village's community centre until 2020, as it was sold to a development company in 2013 to become residential dwellings.

A new community centre named 'The Beryl Platt Centre' has been built in the garden of Longmeads House, which now takes the place of Longmeads House as the village's community centre.
