= 2LO =

Radio station in London, England, 1922–1930

- London; England
- Frequency: 857 kHz

Ownership
- Owner: Marconi Company (1922); British Broadcasting Company Ltd. (1922–1926); British Broadcasting Corporation (BBC) (1927–1930)

History
- First air date: 11 May 1922
- Last air date: 9 March 1930

Technical information
- Licensing authority: General Post Office
- ERP: 100 watts
- Transmitter coordinates: 51.511994°N 0.118383°W

2LO Calling
Unidentified male announcer, speaking the 2LO call sign

2LO was the second radio station to regularly broadcast in the United Kingdom (the first was 2MT). It began broadcasting on 11 May 1922, for one hour a day from the seventh floor of Marconi House in London's Strand, opposite Somerset House.

== History ==
Initially the power was 100 watts on 369 metres (812 kHz). 2LO was allowed to transmit for seven minutes, after which the "operator" had to listen on the wavelength for three minutes for possible instructions to close down. On 14 November 1922 the station was transferred to the new British Broadcasting Company which in 1923 took up the nearby Savoy Hill for its broadcasting studios. At midnight on New Year's Eve 1923, the twelve chimes of Big Ben were broadcast for the first time to mark the new year.

In 1927 the company became the British Broadcasting Corporation. On 9 March 1930 2LO was replaced by the BBC Regional Programme and the BBC National Programme.

== Preservation and legacy ==
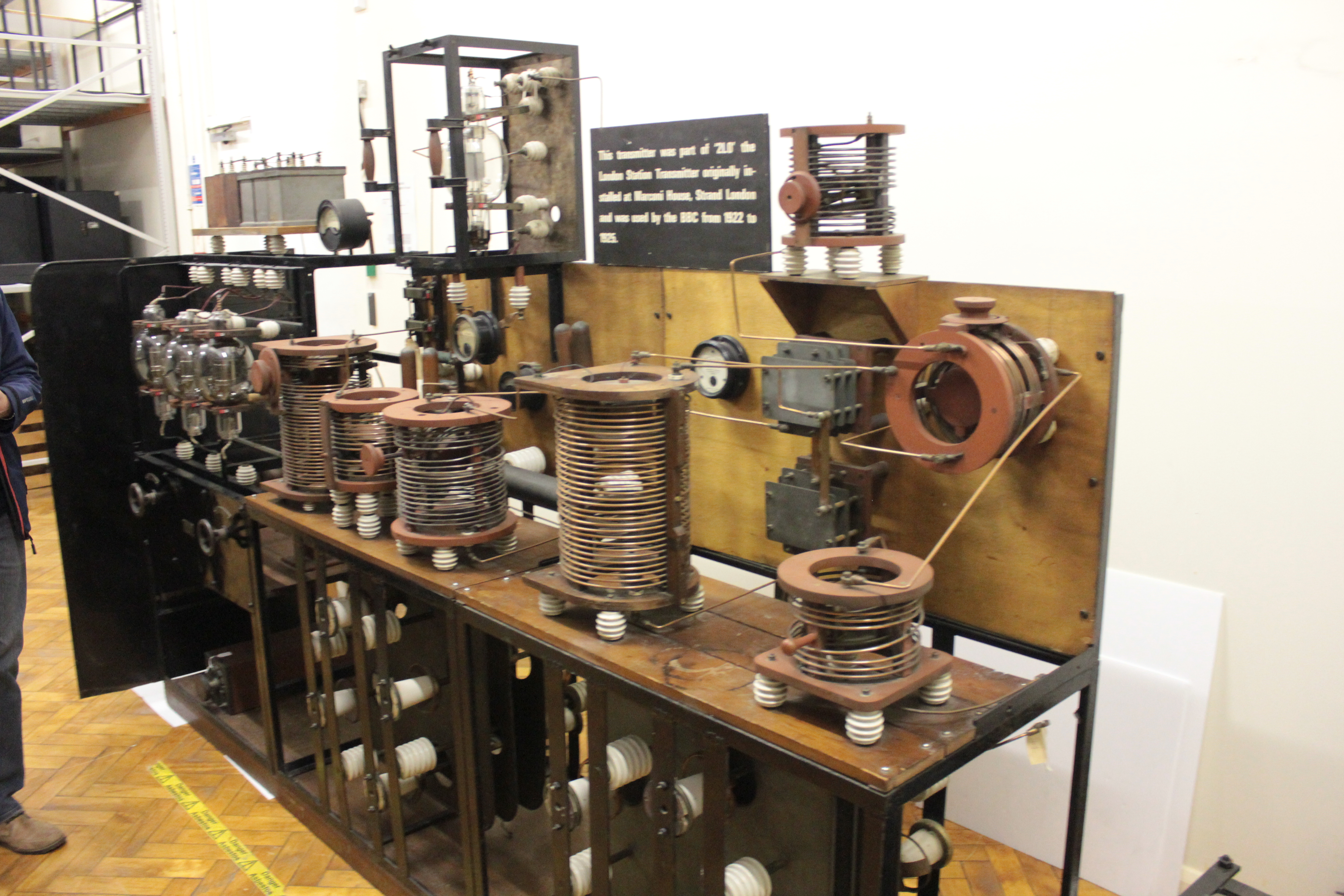
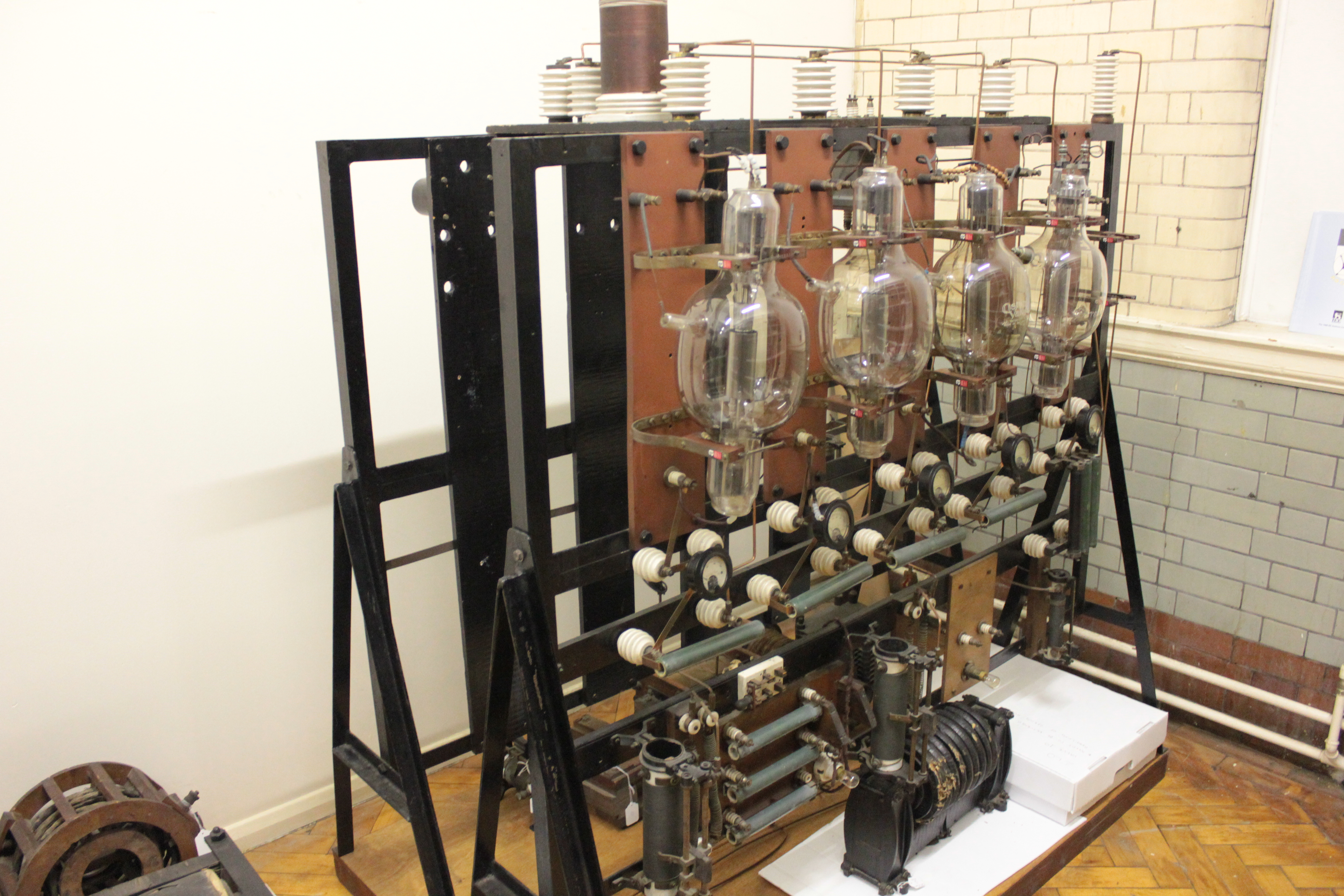
Parts of the 2LO transmitter in the Science Museum, London (2013)

The 2LO transmitter now belongs to the Science Museum, having been donated by Crown Castle International on 7 November 2002. It is displayed in the Information Age gallery on the second floor of the museum.

Marconi House was demolished in 2006, apart from the listed façade, which was incorporated into a new hotel complex. A first-hand account of a broadcast from 2LO is given in The Spell of London by H. V. Morton.

The 'LO' part of 2LO's callsign was adopted in 1924 by the metropolitan radio station in Melbourne which, since 1932, has been a part of the Australian Broadcasting Corporation. The station, 3LO (officially VL3LO), still has this callsign allocated to it, but since 2000 it has used different on-air names: as from 2017, it was 774 ABC Melbourne; and it is now ABC Radio Melbourne.

The amateur radio callsign G2LO is currently held by the staff association at Arqiva, formerly Crown Castle International, formerly the domestic part of BBC Transmitter Department.

== In fiction ==
2LO is briefly mentioned in two works by Dorothy L. Sayers featuring her detective Lord Peter Wimsey: the 1926 novel Clouds of Witness and the 1928 short story "The Entertaining Episode of the Article in Question".

A 2LO broadcast with a weather forecast and news bulletin is mentioned in Chapter V of Sir Arthur Conan Doyle's The Maracot Deep, first published as a serial in 1927.

2LO is mentioned in Chapter 32 of Anthony Burgess's 1980 novel Earthly Powers, as part of a fictional episode involving the narrator's brother.

== Sources ==
- H.V. Morton. 1926, 18th Edition 1948, The spell of London, Methuen & Co Ltd, London.
