= Arthur O'Connell =

American actor (1908–1981)

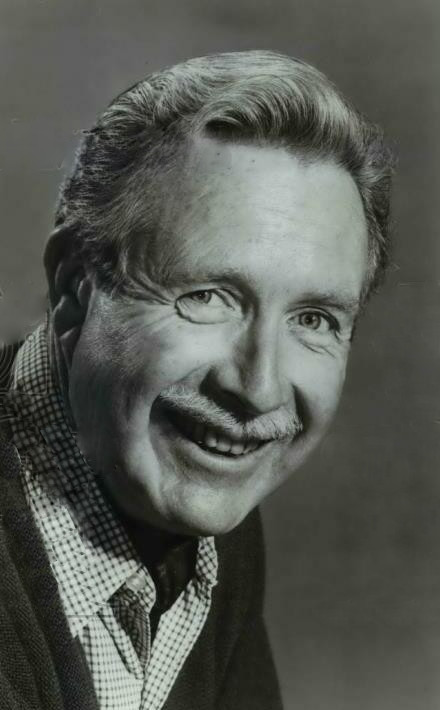
- O'Connell in 1967
- Born: March 29, 1908; New York City, U.S.
- Died: May 18, 1981 (aged 73); Los Angeles, California, U.S.
- Resting place: Calvary Cemetery in Queens, New York
- Occupation: Actor
- Years active: 1929–1981
- Spouse: Ann Hall Dunlop (m. 1962; div. 1972)

Arthur Joseph O'Connell (March 29, 1908 – May 18, 1981) was an American stage, film and television actor, who achieved prominence in character roles in the 1950s. He was nominated for the Academy Award for Best Supporting Actor for both Picnic (1955) and Anatomy of a Murder (1959).

== Early life ==
Arthur O'Connell was born to Julia (née Byrne) & Michael O'Connell on March 29, 1908, in Manhattan, New York. His father died when O'Connell was two, and his mother when he was 12. He was the youngest of four siblings: William, Kathleen, and Juliette. William, the eldest, became a justice of the New York State Supreme Court and died in 1972.

After his father's death, Arthur was sent to live in Flushing, New York, with his mother's sister, Mrs. Charles Koetzner, while his sisters moved in with other relatives and William remained with his mother. Arthur attended St John's College for two years. His early jobs included working in the engineering department of New York Edison, as a salesman at Macy's, and as a door-to-door salesman of magazines.

== Career ==
=== Early roles ===
O'Connell went into acting in 1929, landing a role in summer stock at the Frankin Stock Company in Dorchester, Massachusetts, playing a role in The Patsy. In 1934 his career was interrupted by a bout of encephalitis, which required a seven-month stay at the Flower Hospital in New York City. He recovered in a sanitarium for the indigent, and for a time was on home relief living in a cheap room, subsisting on "milk, raw eggs and bananas."

He made his legitimate stage debut in the middle 1930s, appearing in various roles in theater and vaudeville in the U.S. and in London.

O'Connell had small film roles early in his career. His film debut was as a student in Freshman Year (1938) and he appeared in a small role as a reporter in Citizen Kane (1941). He costarred in two Leon Errol short subjects as Errol's conniving brother-in-law.

He entered the U.S. Army in 1945 and served in the Signal Corps during World War II. After his discharge, he was spotted in little theatre by Charles Laughton and joined a travelling Shakespearean company. His film roles remained insubstantial, playing a detective in The Naked City (1948) and a reporter in the 1948 film State of the Union.

=== Picnic and success ===
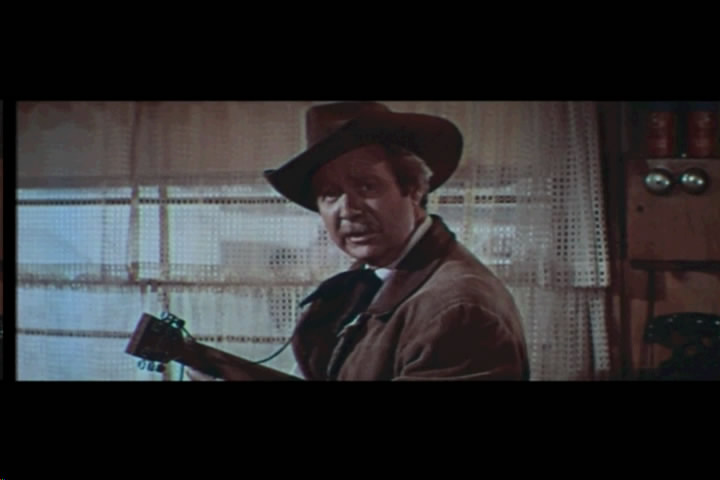
Bus Stop (1956)

His career breakthrough came on Broadway, where he originated the role of Howard Bevans, the middle-aged swain of a spinsterish schoolteacher in Picnic. He recreated the Bevans role in the 1955 film version, opposite Rosalind Russell as the schoolteacher, earning an Oscar nomination. As a result of his critically praised performance in the stage and film roles, he was heavily in demand, resulting in "six good roles in rapid succession." O'Connell made more money in one year after Picnic than in the preceding 25 years.

After Picnic, he appeared in another Joshua Logan film, Bus Stop, in 1956, as the down-to-earth friend of the lead, played by Don Murray. In that same year he appeared in Solid Gold Cadillac, playing a kindly office manager in love with Judy Holliday's assistant, Miss Shotgraven. His performance as James Stewart's alcoholic mentor in Anatomy of a Murder (1959) resulted in a second Oscar nomination.

He also frequently appeared as a father in movies starring teen idols such as Elvis Presley, Pat Boone and Fabian. He frequently played alcoholics, and consulted members of Alcoholics Anonymous in preparation for one of his roles.

In 1959, O'Connell played the part of Chief Petty Officer Sam Tostin, engine room chief of the fictional World War II submarine USS Sea Tiger, opposite Cary Grant and Tony Curtis in Operation Petticoat. In 1961, O'Connell played the role of Grandpa Clarence Beebe in the children's film Misty, the screen adaptation of Marguerite Henry's story Misty of Chincoteague. In 1962, he portrayed the father of Elvis Presley's character in the motion picture Follow That Dream, and in 1964 in the Presley-picture Kissin' Cousins. In the same year, O'Connell portrayed the idealist-turned-antagonist Clint Stark in The 7 Faces of Dr. Lao, which has become a cult classic, and in which O'Connell's is the only character other than star Tony Randall to appear as one of the "7 faces." O'Connell continued appearing in choice character parts on both television and films during the 1960s, but avoided a regular television series, holding out until he could be assured top billing. On Christmas Day, 1962, O'Connell was cast as Clayton Dodd in the episode "Green, Green Hills" of the western series Empire, starring Richard Egan as the rancher Jim Redigo. This episode features Dayton Lummis as Jason Simms and Joanna Moore as Althea Dodd. In 1966, he guest-starred as a scientist who regretfully realized that he has created an all-powerful android (played by James Darren) in an episode of Voyage to the Bottom of the Sea, titled "The Mechanical Man." In the February 1967 episode "Never Look Back" of the TV series Lassie, he played Luther Jennings, an elderly ranger who monitors the survey tower at Strawberry Peak and who takes it hard when he finds he'll lose his job when the tower is slated for destruction.

In 1967, O'Connell co-starred with Monte Markham in The Second Hundred Years, playing the aging son of a gold miner who was frozen for a hundred years in Alaska. The series lasted for one season.

He worked in commercials, playing a friendly pharmacist as a spokesperson for Crest. He made his final film appearance in The Hiding Place (1975), portraying a Dutch watch-maker who hides Jews during World War II. Alzheimer's disease forced his retirement in the mid-1970s.

== Personal life and death ==
In the late 1950s, O'Connell jointly owned a race horse, April Love, with the singer Pat Boone.

In 1962, O'Connell married Ann Hall Dunlop (née Ann Byrd Hall; 1917–2000) of Washington, D.C., widow of William Laird Dunlop III (1909–1960). They met at the inauguration of John F. Kennedy, and divorced in December 1972 in Los Angeles.

On May 18, 1981, O'Connell died of Alzheimer's disease at the Motion Picture Country House and Hospital in the Woodland Hills section of Los Angeles. He was interred at Calvary Cemetery, Queens, New York.

== Filmography ==
Year	Title	Role	Notes
1938	Freshman Year	Student	Uncredited
1939	Murder in Soho	Lefty	
1940	And One Was Beautiful	Moroni's Parking Attendant	Uncredited
1940	Two Girls on Broadway	Reporter at Wedding	Uncredited
1940	I Take This Oath	Court Clerk	Uncredited
1940	The Golden Fleecing	Cameraman	Uncredited
1940	Dr. Kildare Goes Home	New Interne	Uncredited
1940	The Leather Pushers	Reporter	Uncredited
1940	Hullabaloo	Fourth Page	Uncredited
1941	Lucky Devils	Pilot	Uncredited
1941	Citizen Kane	Reporter	Uncredited
1942	Man from Headquarters	Goldie Shores	
1942	Law of the Jungle	Simmons	
1942	Yokel Boy	Second Assistant Director	Uncredited
1942	Canal Zone	New Recruit	Uncredited
1942	Shepherd of the Ozarks	Bruce	Uncredited
1942	Blondie's Blessed Event	Interne	Uncredited
1942	Fingers at the Window	Photographer	Uncredited
1942	Hello, Annapolis	Pharmacist Mate	Uncredited
1948	Open Secret	Carter	
1948	The Naked City	Sgt. Shaeffer	Uncredited
1948	State of the Union	First Reporter	Uncredited
1948	Homecoming	Ambulance Attendant	Uncredited
1948	One Touch of Venus	Reporter	Uncredited
1948	The Countess of Monte Cristo	Assistant Director Jensen	
1948	Force of Evil	Link Hall	Uncredited
1950	Love That Brute	Newspaperman at Funeral	Uncredited
1951	The Whistle at Eaton Falls	Jim Brewster	
1955	Picnic	Howard Bevans	
1956	The Man in the Gray Flannel Suit	Gordon Walker	
1956	The Proud Ones	Jim Dexter	
1956	The Solid Gold Cadillac	Mark Jenkins	
1956	Bus Stop	Virgil Blessing	
1956	The Monte Carlo Story	M. Homer Hinkley	
1957	Operation Mad Ball	Col. Rousch	
1957	The Violators	Solomon Baumgarden	
1957	April Love	Uncle Jed Bruce	
1958	Voice in the Mirror	William R. 'Bill' Tobin	
1958	Man of the West	Sam Beasley	
1959	Gidget	Russell Lawrence	
1959	Anatomy of a Murder	Parnell Emmett McCarthy	
1959	Hound-Dog Man	Aaron McKinney	
1959	Operation Petticoat	Chief Machinist's Mate Sam Tostin	
1960	Cimarron	Tom Wyatt	
1961	The Great Impostor	Warden J.B. Chandler	
1961	Misty	Clarence Beebe	
1961	A Thunder of Drums	Sgt. Karl Rodermill	
1961	Pocketful of Miracles	Count Alfonso Romero	
1962	Follow That Dream	Pop Kwimper	
1964	Kissin' Cousins	Pappy Tatum	
1964	7 Faces of Dr. Lao	Clint Stark	
1964	Your Cheatin' Heart	Fred Rose	
1964	Special for Women: The Menace of Age	Joe Lawson	Television film
1965	Nightmare in the Sun	Sam Wilson	
1965	The Big Valley	Jubal Tanner	Season 1 Episode 5
1965	The Monkey's Uncle	Darius Green III	
1965	The Great Race	Henry Goodbody	
1965	The Third Day	Dr. Wheeler	
1966	Ride Beyond Vengeance	The Narrator	
1966	The Silencers	Joe Wigman	
1966	Fantastic Voyage	Colonel Donald Reid	
1966	Birds Do It	Prof. Wald	
1967	A Covenant with Death	Judge Hockstadter	
1967	The Reluctant Astronaut	Arbuckle Fleming	
1967-1968	The Second Hundred Years	Edwin Carpenter	TV series
1968	The Power	Professor Henry Hallson	
1968	If He Hollers, Let Him Go!	Prosecutor	
1970	Suppose They Gave a War and Nobody Came	Mr. Kruft	
1970	There Was a Crooked Man...	Mr. Lomax	
1970	Do Not Throw Cushions Into the Ring	Business Agent	
1971	The Last Valley	Hoffman	
1972	Ben	Billy Hatfield	
1972	They Only Kill Their Masters	Ernie	
1972	The Poseidon Adventure	Chaplain John	
1972	The Jimmy Stewart Show	Claude Peebles	Episode "Old School Ties"
1973	Wicked, Wicked	Mr. Fenley	
1974	Huckleberry Finn	Col. Grangerford	
1975	Emergency!	Mr. Metfort	Season 5, Episode 9
1975	The Hiding Place	Caspar ten Boom	
