= 1967 in American television =

This is a list of American television-related events in 1967.

== Events ==
Date	Event	Ref.
January 7	The Newlywed Game debuts a primetime edition on ABC.	
January 15	CBS and NBC each broadcast their coverage of the first-ever Super Bowl from the Los Angeles Memorial Coliseum, in which the NFL's Green Bay Packers defeat the AFL's Kansas City Chiefs, by a score of 35-10. The game is seen by a combined 51.18 million viewers between the two networks.	
February 16	Ricardo Montalbán makes his debut in the NBC Sci-fi series Star Trek as popular villain Khan Noonien Singh, in the episode "Space Seed".	
May 1	The United Network launches (as the Overmyer Network) with the premiere of the short-lived program, The Las Vegas Show, the only show it airs. Transmission expenses prompt the show and the network to cease operations after one month.	
August 21	Dark Shadows on ABC and As the World Turns on CBS become the first daytime soap operas on their respective networks to broadcast in color.	
August 29	The second part of the two-part series finale of The Fugitive, entitled "The Judgment" is broadcast on ABC. The episode features the final confrontation between the titular fugitive, Dr. Richard Kimble, and Fred Johnson, the one-armed man who is the real murderer of Kimble's wife, Helen. Part two of the finale would become the most-watched television series episode up to this time. It is viewed by 25.7 million households (45.9 percent of American households with a television set and a 72 percent share), meaning that more than 78 million people tune in.	
September 9	NBC airs what will prove to be the pilot of Rowan and Martin's Laugh-In; which will have its actual series premiere on January 22, 1968.	
September 17	The Doors' appearance on The Ed Sullivan Show results in the banning of the band from future episodes due to Jim Morrison ignoring Sullivan's request to change one of the lyrics in the song they performed, "Light My Fire".	
November 7	The Corporation for Public Broadcasting is established when U.S. president Lyndon B. Johnson signs the Public Broadcasting Act of 1967.	
Unknown	The FCC issues an order that requires cigarette ads on television, radio and in print to include a warning about the health risks of smoking.	

== Television programs ==
=== Debuts ===
Date	Debut	Network
January 9	Captain Nice	NBC
January 9	Mr. Terrific	CBS
January 10	The Invaders	ABC
January 12	Dragnet	NBC
January 13	Rango	ABC
January 29	CBS Playhouse	CBS
February	CBS Children's Film Festival	CBS
February 5	The Smothers Brothers Comedy Hour	CBS
February 19	NBC Experiment in Television	NBC
February 23	Washington Week	NET
April 17	The Joey Bishop Show	ABC
May 29	Coronet Blue	CBS
September 5	Garrison's Gorillas	ABC
September 5	Good Morning World	CBS
September 5	N.Y.P.D.	ABC
September 6	Custer	CBS
September 6	He & She	CBS
September 6	The Second Hundred Years	ABC
September 7	Cimarron Strip	CBS
September 7	The Flying Nun	ABC
September 8	The Guns of Will Sonnett	ABC
September 8	Hondo	ABC
September 9	The Abbott and Costello Cartoon Show	Syndication
September 9	Birdman and the Galaxy Trio	NBC
September 9	Fantastic Four	ABC
September 9	George of the Jungle	ABC
September 9	The Herculoids	CBS
September 9	Journey to the Center of the Earth	ABC
September 9	Moby Dick and Mighty Mightor	CBS
September 9	Samson & Goliath	NBC
September 9	Shazzan	CBS
September 9	Spider-Man	ABC
September 9	Super Chicken	ABC
September 9	The Superman/Aquaman Hour of Adventure	CBS
September 10	The Mothers-in-Law	NBC
September 11	The Carol Burnett Show	CBS
September 11	Cowboy in Africa	ABC
September 11	The Danny Thomas Hour	NBC
September 12	The Jerry Lewis Show	NBC
September 14	Ironside	NBC
September 16	Maya	NBC
September 16	Super President	NBC
September 18	Love Is a Many Splendored Thing	CBS
November 6	The Phil Donahue Show	WLWD

=== Ending this year ===
Date	Show	Network	Debut	Status
January 2	Run, Buddy, Run	CBS	September 12, 1966	Ended
January 21	Cool McCool	NBC	September 10, 1966	Ended
January 21	Frankenstein Jr. and The Impossibles	CBS	September 10, 1966	Ended
January 21	The Super 6	NBC	September 10, 1966	Ended
February 4	The Space Kidettes	NBC	September 10, 1966	Ended
March 4	Underdog	CBS	October 3, 1964 (on NBC)	Canceled
March 11	Pistols 'n' Petticoats	CBS	September 17, 1966	Ended
March 11	The Mighty Heroes	CBS	October 29, 1966	Ended
March 13	Combat!	ABC	October 2, 1962	Ended
March 17	The Green Hornet	ABC	September 9, 1966	Canceled
March 25	Laurel and Hardy	NBC	September 10, 1966	Ended
March 31	T.H.E. Cat	NBC	September 16, 1966	Ended
March 31	Where the Action Is	ABC	June 28, 1965	Ended
April 2	It's About Time	CBS	September 11, 1966	Ended
April 6	F Troop	ABC	September 14, 1965	Ended
April 6	Love on a Rooftop	ABC	September 6, 1966	Ended
April 7	Laredo	NBC	September 16, 1965	Ended
April 7	The Pruitts of Southampton	ABC	September 6, 1966	Ended
April 11	The Girl from U.N.C.L.E.	NBC	September 16, 1966	Ended
April 15	Flipper	NBC	September 19, 1964	Ended
April 22	Please Don't Eat the Daisies	NBC	September 14, 1965	Canceled
May 5	Rango	ABC	January 13, 1967	Canceled
May 17	Bob Hope Presents the Chrysler Theatre	NBC	October 4, 1963	Ended
June 28	The Danny Kaye Show	CBS	September 25, 1963	Canceled
August 28	Mr. Terrific	CBS	January 9, 1967	Canceled
August 28	Vacation Playhouse	CBS	July 22, 1963	Ended
August 29	Captain Nice	NBC	January 9, 1967	Ended
August 29	The Fugitive	ABC	September 17, 1963	Ended
August 29	Occasional Wife	ABC	September 13, 1966	Ended
September 1	The Time Tunnel	ABC	September 9, 1966	Canceled
September 3	What's My Line?	CBS	February 2, 1950	Ended
September 4	Gilligan's Island	CBS	September 26, 1964	Ended
September 4	Coronet Blue	CBS	May 29, 1967	Ended
September 7	Precious Pupp	NBC	October 2, 1965	Ended
September 7	The Hillbilly Bears	NBC	October 2, 1965	Ended
September 16	Space Ghost	CBS	September 10, 1966	Canceled
October 4	Batfink	KTLA; Syndication	April 21, 1966	Canceled
December 27	Custer	ABC	September 6, 1967	Ended
December 29	Hondo	ABC	September 8, 1967	Canceled
December 30	George of the Jungle	ABC	September 9, 1967	Ended
December 30	Super Chicken	ABC	September 9, 1967	Ended

=== Television specials and/or miniseries ===
Title	Network	Date(s) of airing	Notes/Ref,
February 25	Jack and the Beanstalk	NBC	First television special that combined animation with live action.
June 12	You're in Love, Charlie Brown	CBS	
December 11	Movin' With Nancy	NBC	All-star special starring Nancy Sinatra

== Networks and services ==
=== Network launches ===
Network	Type	Launch date	Notes
Overmyer Network	Cable television	May 1	

=== Network closures ===
Network	Type	Closure date	Notes
Overmyer Network	Cable television	June 1	

== Television stations ==
=== Sign-ons ===
Date	City of License/Market	Station	Channel	Affiliation	Notes/Ref.
January	Canton, Ohio	WJAN	17	Independent	
January	Richmond, Virginia	WCVW-TV	57	NET	
January 1	Pelham/Albany, Georgia	WABW-TV	14	NET/GPB	Satellite of WGTV/Atlanta, Georgia
January 2	Pelham/Albany, Georgia	WABW-TV	14	NET/GPB	
January 3	Dalton/Chatsworth, Georgia (Chattanooga, Tennessee)	WCLP	9	NET/GPB	Satellite of WGTV/Atlanta, Georgia
January 5	Fontana/Los Angeles, California	KLXA-TV	40	Bilingual independent	Now TBN flagship KTBN-TV; license reassigned to Santa Ana, California in 1973
January 6	Houston, Texas	KHTV	39	Independent	
January 29	Grand Forks, North Dakota	WDAZ-TV	6	NBC	
January 30	Chatsworth/Dalton, Georgia (Chattanooga, Tennessee)	WNGH-TV	18	NET	Part of the Georgia Public Broadcasting television network
February 1	Tucson, Arizona	KZAZ	11	Independent	
March 1	Baltimore, Maryland	WMET-TV	24	Independent	
March 5	Norwich, Connecticut	WEDN	9	NET	Satellite of WEDH/Hartford
March 6	Dawson/Americus, Georgia	WACS-TV	25	NET/GPB	Satellite of WGTV/Atlanta, Georgia
March 15	Sneedville/Kingsport, Tennessee	WSJK-TV	2	NET	
March 27	Mount Pleasant, Michigan	WCMU-TV	14	NET	
April 5	New York City	WNYE	25	NET	
April 24	Spokane, Washington	KSPS	7	NET	
June 4	Reno, Nevada	KTVN	2	ABC	Now a CBS affiliate.
June 8	Providence, Rhode Island	WSBE-TV	36	NET	
June 25	San Diego, California	KEBS-TV	15	NET	
July 9	Charlotte, North Carolina	WCTU-TV	36	Independent	
August 1	Roanoke, Virginia	WBRA-TV	15	NET	
August 5	Nashville, Tennessee	WMCV	17	Independent	
August 9	Florence, Alabama	WFIQ	36	NET	
August 13	Erie, Pennsylvania	WQLN	54	NET	
August 19	Monroe, Louisiana	KUZN	14	Independent	
August 31	Hibbing, Minnesota	WIRT-TV	13	ABC	Satellite of WDIO-TV in Duluth
September 1	Atlanta, Georgia	WJRJ-TV	17	Independent	
September 1	Bassett, Nebraska	KMNE-TV	7	NET/Nebraska ETV	
September 3	Florence/Myrtle Beach, South Carolina	WJPM-TV	33	NET	Satellite of WRLK-TV/Columbia, South Carolina
September 5	Sioux City, Iowa	KMEG	14	CBS	
September 10	Las Vegas, Nevada	KHBV-TV	5	Independent	
September 11	Asheville, North Carolina	WUNF-TV	33	NET	Satellite of WUNC-TV/Chapel Hill, North Carolina
September 11	Boone/Hickory, North Carolina	WUNE-TV	17	NET	Satellite of WUNC-TV/Chapel Hill, North Carolina
September 11	Concord, North Carolina	WUNG-TV	58	NET	Satellite of WUNC-TV/Chapel Hill, North Carolina
September 11	Pensacola, Florida	WSRE	23	NET	
September 14	Rapid City, South Dakota	KBHE-TV	9	NET	Part of South Dakota Public Broadcasting
September 15	Poplar Bluff, Missouri	KPOB-TV	15	ABC	Full-time satellite of WSIL-TV/Harrisburg, Illinois
September 17	Phoenix, Arizona	KPAZ-TV	21	Bilingual independent	
September 20	Miami, Florida	WCIX-TV	6	Independent	Now WFOR-TV, a CBS O&O on channel 4
September 25	Boston, Massachusetts	WGBX-TV	44	NET	
October	Saipan, Northern Mariana Islands	WSZE-TV	10	NBC (primary); ABC/CBS (secondary)	Satellite of KUAM-TV/Hagåtña, Guam
October 1	Dallas, Texas	KMEC-TV	33	Independent	
October 9	San Francisco, California	KGSC-TV	36	Independent	
October 16	Burlington, Vermont	WETK	32	NET	Flagship of the Vermont ETV network; the other three stations of that network would sign on the following year.
October 16	New Orleans, Louisiana	WWOM-TV	26	Independent	
October 31	Anchorage, Alaska	KHAR-TV	13	Independent	
November 6	Greensboro, North Carolina	WUBC	48	Independent	
November 14	Miami, Florida	WAJA-TV	23	Independent	
December 28	Topeka, Kansas	KTSB	27	NBC (primary); ABC (secondary)	

=== Network affiliation changes ===
Date	City of license/Market	Station	Channel	Old affiliation	New affiliation	Notes/Ref.
January	Jackson, Tennessee	WBBJ-TV	7	CBS	ABC	
March 6	Bowling Green, Kentucky	WLTV	13	Independent	ABC	
June 4	Reno, Nevada	KCRL-TV	4	NBC (primary); ABC (secondary)	NBC (exclusive)	
September 2	Huntsville, Alabama	WAAY-TV	31	ABC	NBC	This affiliation switch was reversed on December 11, 1977.
September 2	Sioux City, Iowa	KCAU-TV	9	CBS (basic, as KVTV)	ABC (full-time)	
October 1	Anchorage, Alaska	KENI-TV	2	ABC/NBC (joint primary)	ABC (exclusive)	

=== Station closures ===
Date	City of license/Market	Station	Channel	Affiliation	Sign-on date	Notes
August 14	Danville, Illinois	WICD	24	ABC	December 19, 1953	
December	Oklahoma City, Oklahoma	KLPR-TV	14	Independent	May 31, 1966	
