= 1968 in American television =

This is a list of American television-related events in 1968.

== Events ==
Date	Event	Ref.
January 20	The TVS Television Network broadcasts the first-ever syndicated primetime college basketball game at the Houston Astrodome. Billed as "The Game of the Century", the Houston Cougars defeat the UCLA Bruins 71–69.	
February 6	ABC's coverage of the 1968 Winter Olympics in Grenoble, France became the first Olympics, Summer or Winter, to be telecast in color on any American network.	
April 2	NBC broadcasts a television special in which British singer Petula Clark appears with Harry Belafonte as her guest. An innocent, affectionate gesture between the two during a song (Clark touches Belafonte on the arm) prompts concern from the show's sponsor (Chrysler Corporation) due to the difference in their races.	
April 4	Singer James Brown appears on national television in an attempt to calm feelings of anger following the assassination of Reverend Doctor Martin Luther King Jr.	
September 9	Two CBS soap operas, Search for Tomorrow and The Guiding Light, expand to 30 minutes per episode.	
October 12–27	ABC broadcasts coverage of the 1968 Summer Olympics in Mexico City, D.F., Mexico. This is the first Summer Olympics to be telecast in color in the United States.	
October 14	First live television broadcast from a spacecraft in orbit, during the Apollo 7 mission. There are six broadcasts during the eleven-day mission.	
October 19	Bea Benaderet makes her final physical appearance as Kate Bradley on the CBS sitcom Petticoat Junction. This particular episode actually airs six days after her death from lung cancer. Benaderet's final overall episode of Petticoat Junction would air one week later and would feature only her voice with her stand-in filmed from the rear.	
November 17	Protest ensues when NBC breaks away from the final minutes of an American Football League game to air a television movie adaptation of Heidi, much to the outrage of the network's AFL viewers. After the break away, the Oakland Raiders scored two touchdowns to defeat the New York Jets, 43–32, in the final minute of play.	
November 17	WABC-TV debuts the Eyewitness News format on behalf of news director Al Primo.	
November 22	On NBC, an interracial kiss is aired in the Star Trek episode "Plato's Stepchildren". The kiss is shared by William Shatner (James T. Kirk) and Nichelle Nichols (Nyota Uhura).	
December 24	The reading a passage from the Book of Genesis from Apollo 8 is telecast via the Intelsat 3 satellite to millions of people in over thirty countries across both Americas and Europe, with a report that there is a Santa Claus. COMSAT put the Intelsat satellite into operation a week ahead of schedule so that international audiences could follow the flight. This marked the fourth television broadcast from the spacecraft during the space mission.	

=== Other events and statistics in 1968 ===
- The last round-screen color television sets were produced by all American manufacturers.

== Television programs ==
=== Debuts ===
Date	Debut	Network
January 6	Happening '68	ABC
January 8	The Undersea World of Jacques Cousteau	ABC
January 22	Rowan & Martin's Laugh-In	NBC
February 19	Mister Rogers' Neighborhood	NET
June 12	Black Journal	NET
June 16	Animal World	NBC
July 1	Premiere	CBS
July 15	One Life to Live	ABC
September 7	Arabian Knights	NBC
September 7	The Banana Splits	NBC
September 7	Danger Island	NBC
September 12	Soul!	WNDT
September 14	The Adventures of Gulliver	ABC
September 14	The Archie Show	CBS
September 14	Fantastic Voyage	ABC
September 14	Go Go Gophers	CBS
September 14	Wacky Races	CBS
September 15	The New Adventures of Huckleberry Finn	NBC
September 17	Julia	NBC
September 18	The Outsider	NBC
September 20	Hawaii Five-O	CBS
September 20	The Name of the Game	NBC
September 21	Adam-12	NBC
September 21	The Ghost & Mrs. Muir	NBC
September 23	Mayberry R.F.D.	CBS
September 23	The Outcasts	ABC
September 24	60 Minutes	CBS
September 24	The Doris Day Show	CBS
September 24	The Mod Squad	ABC
September 24	That's Life	ABC
September 25	The Good Guys	CBS
September 25	Here Come the Brides	ABC
September 26	Blondie	CBS
September 26	Journey to the Unknown	ABC
September 26	The Ugliest Girl in Town	ABC

=== Ending this year ===
Date	Show	Network	Debut
January 6	Iron Horse	ABC	1966
January 6	Moby Dick and Mighty Mightor	CBS	1967
January 6	The Herculoids	CBS	1967
January 15	The Man from U.N.C.L.E.	NBC	1964
January 20	Birdman and the Galaxy Trio	NBC	1967
January 20	Shazzan	CBS	1967
February 10	Maya	NBC	1967
March 2	ABC Scope	ABC	1964
March 6	Lost in Space	CBS	1965
March 7	Cimarron Strip	CBS	1967
March 11	The Lucy Show	CBS	1962
March 12	He & She	CBS	1967
March 14	Garrison's Gorillas	ABC	1967
March 14	Batman	ABC	1966
March 18	The Rat Patrol	ABC	1966
March 19	Good Morning World	CBS	1967
March 25	The Monkees	NBC	1966
March 25	The Bell Telephone Hour	NBC	1959
March 25	The Fulton Sheen Program	Syndication	1961
March 27	Run for Your Life	NBC	1965
March 28	The Second Hundred Years	ABC	1967
March 29	The Invaders	ABC	1967
March 31	Voyage to the Bottom of the Sea	ABC	1964
April 1	The Andy Griffith Show	CBS	1960
April 1	Cowboy in Africa	ABC	1967
April 5	Tarzan	ABC	1966
April 15	I Spy	NBC	1965
June 3	The Danny Thomas Hour	NBC	1967
August 31	Samson & Goliath	NBC	1967
September 8	Milton the Monster	ABC	1965
September 9	Premiere	CBS	1968
September 21	The Fantastic Four	ABC	1967
November 2	The Adventures of Superboy	CBS	1966
December 28	Super President	NBC	1967
Unknown	The Gumby Show	Syndication	1957
Unknown	The Road Runner Show (returned in 1971)	CBS	1966

=== Television specials ===
Title	Network	Date(s) of airing	Notes/Ref,
He's Your Dog, Charlie Brown	CBS	February 14	
Elvis	NBC	December 3	Elvis Presley's first television appearance in seven years; highest rated television special of 1968.

== Networks and services ==
=== Network launches ===
Network	Type	Launch date	Source
Kentucky Educational Television	Regional Over-the-air public broadcast	September 23	

=== Network conversions and rebrandings ===
Network	Type	Conversion date	Source
Sports Network Incorporated	Hughes Television Network	Unknown	

== Television stations ==
=== Sign-ons ===
Date	City of License/Market	Station	Channel	Affiliation	Notes/Ref.
January 1	Macon, Georgia	WMUM-TV	29	NET	Part of the Georgia Public Broadcasting television network
January 2	San Francisco, California	KBHK-TV	44	Independent	
January 4	Joplin, Missouri	KUHI-TV	16	CBS	
January 6	Dayton, Ohio	WSWO-TV	26	Independent	
January 19	Cleveland, Ohio	WKBF-TV	61	Independent	
February	Galveston, Texas	KVVV-TV	16	Independent	
February 4	Brookings, South Dakota	KESD-TV	8	NET	Part of South Dakota Public Broadcasting
February 5	Dallas, Texas	KDTV	39	Independent	
February 13	Lexington/Jackson, Tennessee	WLJT-TV	11	NET	
February 15	Vincennes, Indiana	WVUT	22	NET	
February 26	St. Johnsbury, Vermont	WVTB	18	NET	Satellite of WETK/Burlington; part of the Vermont ETV network
March 15	Las Vegas, Nevada	KLVX	10	NET	
March 18	Rutland, Vermont	WVER	9	NET	Satellite of WETK/Burlington; part of the Vermont ETV network
March 18	Windsor, Vermont	WVTA	24	NET	Satellite of WETK/Burlington; part of the Vermont ETV network
April 1	San Francisco, California	KEMO-TV	20	Bilingial independent	
April 11	Hanover, New Hampshire	WHED-TV	15	PBS	Part of New Hampshire Public Television
May 12	Binghamton, New York	WSKG-TV	46	NET	
May 21	Keene, New Hampshire	WEKW-TV	49	NET	Satellite of WENH-TV/Durham, NH as part of New Hampshire Public Television
June 2	Lexington, Kentucky	WBLG-TV	62 (now on 36)	ABC	
June 10	Kalispell, Montana	KCFW	9	CBS	
June 10	Meridian, Mississippi	WHTV	24	CBS	
August 1	Fon du Lac, Wisconsin	KFIZ-TV	34	Independent	
August 1	Newport, Kentucky (Cincinnati, Ohio)	WXIX-TV	19	Independent	
August 4	Paterson, New Jersey/New York City, New York	WXTV	41	Independent	
August 19	Burlington, Vermont ((Plattsburgh, New York)	WEZF-TV	22	ABC	
August 19	Olney, Illinois	WUSI-TV	16	NET	Satellite of WSIU-TV/Carbondale, Illinois
September 9	Louisville, Alabama	WGIQ	43	NET	Part of the Alabama Educational Television network.
September 15	Lorain/Cleveland, Ohio	WUAB	43	Independent	
September 15	Detroit, Michigan	WXON-TV	62 (now 28)	Independent	
September 15	Palm Springs, California	KMIR-TV	36	NBC	
September 15	Poplar Bluff, Missouri	KPOB-TV	15	ABC	Satellite of WSIL-TV of Harrisburg, Illinois
September 22	Springfield, Missouri	KMTC	27	ABC	
September 23	Ashland, Kentucky	WKAS	25	Educational independent	Part of Kentucky Educational Television
September 23	Bowling Green, Kentucky	WKGB-TV	53	Educational independent	Part of Kentucky Educational Television
September 23	Elizabethtown, Kentucky	WKZT-TV	23	Educational independent	Part of Kentucky Educational Television
September 23	Lexington, Kentucky	WKLE	46	Educational independent	Flagship of Kentucky Educational Television
September 23	Madisonville, Kentucky	WKMA-TV	35	Educational independent	Part of Kentucky Educational Television
September 23	Morehead, Kentucky	WKMR	38	Educational independent	Part of Kentucky Educational Television
September 23	Owenton, Kentucky	WKON	52	Educational independent	Part of Kentucky Educational Television
September 23	Somerset, Kentucky	WKSO-TV	29	Educational independent	Part of Kentucky Educational Television
September 23	September 30	Macon, Georgia	WCWB-TV	41	NBC
October 5	Palm Springs, California	KPLM-TV	42	ABC	
October 9	Murray, Kentucky	WKMU	21	Educational independent	Part of Kentucky Educational Television
October 26	Sacramento, California	KTXL	40	Independent	
November 4	Durham/Raleigh, North Carolina	WRDU-TV	28	NBC	
November 4	Tampa, Florida	WTOG	44	Independent	
November 11	Lubbock, Texas	KSEL-TV	28	Independent	
November 13	Hazard, Kentucky	WKHA	35	Educational independent	Part of Kentucky Educational Television
November 18	Hastings, Nebraska	KHNE-TV	29	NET	Part of Nebraska ETV
December 4	Little Rock, Arkansas	KETS	2	NET	Flagship of the Arkansas Educational Television Network
December 6	Fort Lauderdale/Miami, Florida	WSMS-TV	51	Independent	
December 9	Merriman, Nebraska	KRNE-TV	12	NET	Part of Nebraska ETV
December 11	El Centro, California (Yuma, Arizona, USA/Mexicali, Baja California, Mexico)	KECC-TV	9	ABC	
December 14	Ventura/Los Angeles, California	KKOG-TV	16	Independent	
December 18	Fort Myers, Florida	WBBH-TV	20	NBC (primary); ABC (secondary)	
December 24	Augusta, Georgia	WAGT	26	NBC	
December 28	San Francisco, California	KUDO	38	Independent	
Unknown date	Corpus Christi, Texas	KVDO-TV	22	Independent	
Unknown date	Hollywood/Miami, Florida	WYHS	69	Independent	Satellite of WCIX-TV (now WFOR-TV) Miami

=== Network affiliation changes ===
Date	City of license/Market	Station	Channel	Old affiliation	New affiliation	Notes/Ref.
January 1	Joplin, Missouri	KODE-TV	12	CBS (primary); ABC (secondary)	ABC (exclusive)	KUHI would take the CBS affiliation in Joplin, Missouri, three days later.
June 2	Lexington, Kentucky	WLEX-TV	18	NBC (primary); CBS/ABC (secondary)	NBC (exclusive)	The ABC affiliation in Lexington was taken by WTVQ upon that station's sign on.
June 2	Lexington, Kentucky	WKYT-TV	27	ABC (primary); CBS (secondary)	CBS (exclusive)	The ABC affiliation in Lexington was taken by WTVQ upon that station's sign on.
September 30	Macon, Georgia	WMAZ-TV	13	CBS (primary); ABC and NBC (secondary)	CBS (primary); ABC (secondary)	

=== Station closures ===
Date	City of license/Market	Station	Channel	Affiliation	Sign-on date	Notes
August 23	Lebanon, New Hampshire	WRLH	31	NBC	July 29, 1966	Would return to the air in August 1971
