= Ricky Kelman =

American actor

- Born: Rickey William Kelman; July 6, 1949 (age 77)
- Occupations: Actor: The Dennis O'Keefe Show; Our Man Higgins
- Years active: 1954 – 1974

Rickey William Kelman (born July 6, 1949) is a former actor. He had supporting roles in two single-season sitcoms, The Dennis O'Keefe Show (1959-1960) on CBS and Our Man Higgins (1962-1963) on ABC.

== Major roles ==
On The Dennis O'Keefe Show, Kelman played 10-year-old Randy Towne, reared by a single father, Hal Towne (Dennis O'Keefe), who writes a newspaper column entitled "All Around Towne". Kelman appeared in all thirty-two episodes of the series. Hope Emerson was cast as Amelia "Sarge" Sargent, the stern housekeeper, hence her name. Emerson died fifteen days before the last new episode of the series was aired, but she had finished her commitment to the program prior to her death and acted in the final segment which aired on May 10, 1960. Eloise Hardt was another regular cast member in the role of Karen Hadley, Hal's girlfriend.

On Our Man Higgins, Kelman was Tommy MacRoberts, one of the three children of a suburban American couple, Duncan and Alice MacRoberts, played by Frank Maxwell and Audrey Totter. Stanley Holloway carried the title role of the MacRoberts' erudite English butler. Kelman appeared in all thirty-four episodes of Our Man Higgins, which might be loosely compared to the more successful NBC sitcom, Hazel starring Shirley Booth as a nosy housekeeper for an attorney, played by Don DeFore, his wife, and their son.

== Child actor ==
Kelman's first appearances were in 1954 and 1955 as a choirboy on The Red Skelton Hour. He had an uncredited role in the 1955 film A Man Called Peter, based on the life of Peter Marshall, the Presbyterian pastor who was twice appointed chaplain of the U.S. Senate. In 1957, he portrayed Jimmy Logan in "Bentley and the Baby Sitter" on CBS's then-new sitcom, Bachelor Father, starring John Forsythe. In 1957, Kelman played "Elmer" in the final Ma and Pa Kettle film, The Kettles on Old MacDonald's Farm, the last screen role for Marjorie Main. Her co-star was Parker Fennelly, however, not Percy Kilbride.

On January 2, 1958, Kelman was Norman Fisher in the episode "The Big Jade" of NBC's pioneering police drama, Dragnet, starring Jack Webb. From 1958 to 1959, young Kelman played Homer Foley in three episodes of the NBC children's western series, Buckskin, with Tommy Nolan and Sally Brophy, as a son and his widowed mother living in a hotel in a small fictitious Montana community. In 1958, Kelman appeared in "The Unfamiliar" on Ronald W. Reagan's CBS anthology series, General Electric Theater.

In the 1960 season premiere of the ABC/Warner Brothers detective series, 77 Sunset Strip, the then 10-year-old Kelman appeared as Randolph in the episode "Attic", set in a remote mountain hideout. The episode stars Roger Smith as Jeff Spencer and features Kathleen Crowley, Cynthia Pepper, Lee Van Cleef, and Gary Vinson. He appeared in 1961 on NBC's Bonanza, with Lorne Greene, in the episodes "Many Faces of Gideon Flinch" and "The Infernal Machine."

In 1961, Kelman was cast in conflicting roles as John and Oliver Hadley in the episodes "The Bully" and "The Sissy", respectively, of NBC's National Velvet family drama series, starring Lori Martin as the teenaged equestrian Velvet Brown. On December 7, 1961, he was cast as "Butch" in the episode "The Fabulous O'Hara" of ABC's sitcom, The Donna Reed Show. In 1961 and 1962, he appeared twice on CBS's Gunsmoke with Andy Clyde and James Arness. In 1962, he played the youthful Alex in the episode "Young Man's Fancy" of CBS's The Twilight Zone, co-starring with Phyllis Thaxter.

Kelman appeared on CBS's Lassie in 1959 and twice in 1965. In 1965, he guest starred as well on the ABC sitcom The Farmer's Daughter, starring William Windom and Inger Stevens.

== Young adult roles ==
On November 29, 1968, Kelman was cast as Donny Clement in the episode "The Fatal Hours" of the ABC police drama Felony Squad, with Howard Duff and Dennis Cole. In 1969, he played an older teenager, Josh Odam, in the episode "Mexican Honeymoon" on CBS's My Three Sons sitcom with Fred MacMurray and Beverly Garland. Three years earlier, he appeared as Frankie Martin in MacMurray's film about the Boy Scouts of America, Follow Me, Boys!.

Kelman played the character Mike in the coming of age picture, The First Time, a 1969 comedy about three inexperienced teenagers pursuing a sexual encounter in what turns out to be a nonexistent bordello near Buffalo, New York. His co-stars were Gerard Parkes and Jacqueline Bisset.

On December 31, 1969, Kelman played Quincy Rust in the episode "The Adversaries" of CBS's Medical Center with James Daly and Chad Everett. The episode focuses on the competition between two interns. Audrey Totter, Kelman's co-star in Our Man Higgins, later joined the Medical Center cast but did not appear in this episode. In 1970, Kelman appeared twice on ABC's high school comedy-drama, Room 222, as Dennis Joplin in "The New Boy" and as Craig in "Captain of the Team". He was cast again with John Forsythe in his CBS sitcom, To Rome with Love.

In 1971, he played Don Harper in "The Climate of Doubt" of the legal drama Men at Law, starring Robert Foxworth. In 1972, he played George Arbor in the episode "The Corruptor" on the ABC crime drama, The F.B.I. In 1972 and 1973, Kelman guest starred in episodes of CBS's Hawaii Five-O and Here's Lucy. In the latter comedy series, he played a 23-year-old "teenager" in the episode "Lucy and Andy Griffith." A decade earlier, Kelman had portrayed John Ballantine in the Lucille Ball and Bob Hope film, Critic's Choice.

Kelman's last acting appearances were in 1973 and 1974 in two episodes of the syndicated anthology series, Insight.

His older brother, Terry Ross Kelman (born 1947), is a former child actor whose screen appearances occurred between 1954 and 1959, with his last work in two episodes of the NBC western series, Wagon Train, starring Ward Bond. He played Davey Sinclair in S2 E30 "The Duke LeMay Story" which aired 4/28/1959.
