= The Violators =

1957 film by John Newland

- Theatrical release poster
- Directed by: John Newland
- Screenplay by: Ernest Pendrell
- Based on: The Violators by Israel Beckhardt; Wenzell Brown
- Produced by: Himan Brown
- Starring: Arthur O'Connell; Nancy Malone; Fred Beir; Clarice Blackburn; Henry Sharp
- Cinematography: Morris Hartzband
- Edited by: Lillian Jones
- Music by: Elliot Lawrence
- Production companies: Galahad Productions; RKO Pictures
- Distributed by: RKO Telepictures
- Release date: November 27, 1957
- Running time: 76 minutes
- Country: United States
- Language: English

The Violators is a 1957 American crime film directed by John Newland, written by Ernest Pendrell, and starring Arthur O'Connell, Nancy Malone, Fred Beir, Clarice Blackburn and Henry Sharp. It was released on November 27, 1957, RKO Pictures.

== Plot ==
A probation officer who is known for his sympathetic attitude towards juvenile delinquents is confronted with a personal conflict when his daughter falls in love with a boy who is himself in trouble with the law.

== Cast ==
- Arthur O'Connell as Solomon Baumgarden
- Nancy Malone as Debbie Baumgarden
- Fred Beir as Jimmy Coogan
- Clarice Blackburn as Eva Baumgarden
- Henry Sharp as David Baumgarden
- Mary Michael as Mrs. Riley
- Joseph Julian as Mr. Riley
- Bill Darrid as Anthony Calini
- Sheila Copelan as Sharon Riley
- Bernard Lenrow as Judge McKenna
- Martin Freed as Barnie
- Mercer McLeod as Judge Blatz
- Eva Steen as Jean
- Norman Rose as Stephen
- Maxine Stewart as Salesgirl
- Margaret Draper as Molly Coogan Casey
- Frank Maxwell as Sam
- John McGovern as Mr. Coogan
- Norman Fell as Ray
- Tom Middleton as Ralph
