= Our Man Higgins =

American TV situation comedy series (1962–1963)

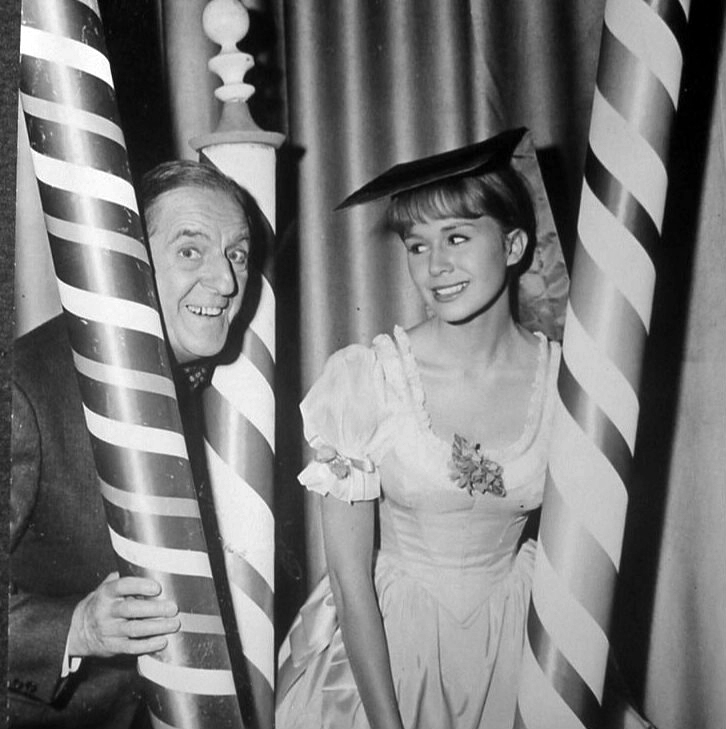
- Stanley Holloway and Regina Groves (1962)
- Genre: Sitcom
- Created by: Paul Harrison
- Starring: Stanley Holloway; Audrey Totter; Frank Maxwell; Ricky Kelman; K.C. Butts; Regina Groves
- Theme music composer: Frank De Vol
- Composer: Frank DeVol
- Country of origin: United States
- Original language: English
- No. of seasons: 1
- No. of episodes: 34

Production
- Producer: Paul Harrison
- Camera setup: Multi-camera
- Running time: 30 minutes
- Production companies: First Company of Writers; Screen Gems

Original release
- Network: ABC
- Release: October 3, 1962 – May 17, 1963

Our Man Higgins is an American sitcom that aired on ABC from October 3, 1962, to May 17, 1963.

== Synopsis ==
Our Man Higgins follows the adventures of an English butler who is inherited by a suburban American family, along with a quarter-century-old silver service valued at $50,000. Higgins answers to Duncan and Alice MacRoberts, whose children are Tommy, Dinghy, and Joanie MacRoberts.

It's Higgins, Sir was previously a 13-episode NBC radio comedy series in 1951, created and produced by Paul Harrison, and written by Harrison and Rik Vollaerts. Harry McNaughton read the starring role of Higgins in that series, broadcast on Tuesdays at 9 P.M. (as Bob Hope's summer replacement).

== Cast ==
- Stanley Holloway as Higgins
- Regina Groves as Joanie MacRoberts
- Audrey Totter as Alice MacRoberts
- Ricky Kelman as Tommy MacRoberts
- Frank Maxwell as Duncan MacRoberts
- K.C. Butts as Dinghy MacRoberts

== Episodes ==
No.	Title	Directed by	Written by	Original release date
1	"It's Higgins, Sir"	Richard Murphy	Richard Murphy	October 3, 1962
2	"A Servant of the People"	Unknown	Unknown	October 10, 1962
3	"Lady of Leisure"	Unknown	Unknown	October 17, 1962
4	"Surprise Party"	Unknown	Unknown	October 24, 1962
5	"From the Forest Primeval"	Unknown	Unknown	October 31, 1962
6	"The Rules of the Road"	Earl Bellamy	Alvin Sapinsley	November 7, 1962
7	"Five Will Get You Ten"	Unknown	Unknown	November 14, 1962
8	"Birthday Party"	Unknown	Unknown	November 21, 1962
9	"Higgins' Little Helper"	Unknown	Unknown	November 28, 1962
10	"Butler Father"	Unknown	Unknown	December 5, 1962
11	"Golf Partner"	Unknown	Unknown	December 12, 1962
12	"The Three Faces of Higgins"	Unknown	Unknown	December 19, 1962
13	"Mr. Gilbert and Mr. Sullivan"	Unknown	Unknown	December 26, 1962
14	"Manchester Minstrel"	Unknown	Unknown	January 2, 1963
15	"The Milkman Cometh"	Unknown	Unknown	January 9, 1963
16	"The Broken Statue"	Unknown	Unknown	January 16, 1963
17	"A Bunch of Forget-Me-Nots"	Unknown	Unknown	January 23, 1963
18	"Prom Girl"	Unknown	Unknown	January 30, 1963
19	"The Royal and Ancient Game"	Unknown	Unknown	February 6, 1963
20	"My First Friend"	Unknown	Unknown	February 13, 1963
21	"The Long, Long Saturday"	Unknown	Unknown	February 20, 1963
22	"Higgins' Understudy"	Unknown	Unknown	February 27, 1963
23	"Black Thursday"	Unknown	Unknown	March 6, 1963
24	"Half a Higgins"	Unknown	Unknown	March 13, 1963
25	"Conflict of Interest"	Unknown	Unknown	March 20, 1963
26	"Higgins and the Hillbilly"	Unknown	Unknown	March 27, 1963
27	"The Reluctant Handicapper"	Unknown	Unknown	April 3, 1963
28	"Meet Aunt Sadie"	Unknown	Unknown	April 10, 1963
29	"Will the Real Mr. Hargrave Please Stand Up?"	Unknown	Unknown	April 17, 1963
30	"Delinquent for a Day"	Unknown	Unknown	April 24, 1963
31	"The Education of Harry Barker"	Unknown	Unknown	May 1, 1963
32	"Who's on First?"	Unknown	Unknown	May 8, 1963
33	"Love is Dandy"	Unknown	Unknown	May 17, 1963
34	"The Dance"	Unknown	Unknown	May 24, 1963

== Guest stars ==
- Don Drysdale
- Stuart Erwin
- Reginald Gardiner
- Connie Gilchrist
- Sylvia Field
- Paul Hartman
- Julian Holloway
- Edward Everett Horton
- Bernie Kopell
- Cheryl Miller
- Roger Mobley
- Slim Pickens
- Stafford Repp
- Roy Roberts
- Kurt Russell
- Martha Stewart
- Dick Wessel
- Mary Wickes
- Dick Wilson

== Scheduling ==
Our Man Higgins, co-sponsored by General Motors' Pontiac division and American Tobacco, aired on ABC at 9:30 P.M. Eastern on Wednesdays opposite The Dick Van Dyke Show on CBS and the second half of Perry Como's Kraft Music Hall on NBC. Higgins followed another one-year ABC series Going My Way, starring Gene Kelly, Dick York, and Leo G. Carroll, in a television version of the 1944 Bing Crosby film.

== Production ==
Harrison and Harry Ackerman were the show's producers. Directors included Richard Murphy, and Frank De Vol directed the music. Its 34 episodes were recorded on film and included a laugh track.

== Critical response ==
A review in the trade publication Variety said that the show "took off slowly" in its premiere episode but showed promise of improvement with better establishment of characters. The review commended Holloway's work but said that the American family need to be made more appealing. It also suggested that the show's language seemed to have "more of a Broadway than a suburban flavor".
