= The First Time (1969 film) =

1969 film by James Neilson

- Theatrical release poster
- Directed by: James Neilson
- Screenplay by: Jo Heims; Roger Smith
- Story by: Bernard Bassey
- Produced by: Roger Smith; Allan Carr
- Starring: Jacqueline Bisset
- Cinematography: Ernest Laszlo
- Edited by: Bud Molin
- Music by: Kenyon Hopkins; Wes Stern; Rick Kelman; Wink Roberts
- Production company: The Mirisch Production Company
- Distributed by: United Artists
- Release date: June 11, 1969; (New York)
- Running time: 90 minutes
- Country: United States
- Language: English
- Budget: $900,000

The First Time is a 1969 American coming of age comedy-drama film directed by James Neilson and starring Jacqueline Bisset. Filming started in July 1968 as Beginners Three.

== Plot ==
Three teen guys decide to lose their virginity. Some really want to and some are peer pressured into it. They're sent on a wild goose chase.

== Cast ==
- Jacqueline Bisset as Anna
- Wes Stern as Kenny
- Rick Kelman as Mike
- Wink Roberts as Tommy
- Gerard Parkes as Charles
- Cosette Lee as Grandmother
- Sharon Acker as Pamela Williams

== Filming locations ==
- Niagara Falls, Ontario, Toronto, Ontario and Kleinburg, Ontario

== See also ==
- List of American films of 1969
