= It's Higgins, Sir =

American radio comedy program

- Genre: comedy
- Running time: 30 minutes
- Country of origin: United States
- Language: English
- Syndicates: NBC
- Starring: Harry McNaughton
- Written by: Paul Harrison
- Directed by: Paul Harrison
- Original release: July 3 – September 25, 1951

It's Higgins, Sir is a radio comedy program in the United States with Harry McNaughton as the title character. It had a limited run on NBC in 1951 as a summer replacement for The Bob Hope Show.

The program's premise was that among an American family's bequests from a British relative was a butler, Higgins. Episodes "focused on the attempts of the English butler to adjust to life in America and to his new employers, and of the family to adjust to having a butler."

Others in the cast besides McNaughton were Vinton Hayworth, Peggy Allenby, Charles Nevil, Pat Hosley, Denise Alexander, Ethel Wilson and Adelaide Klein. One website commented, "It's McNaughton that drives the programme with his fantastic comedic timing, and the rest of the cast does an amazing job in helping him to shine."

Although Higgins didn't last beyond the summer of 1951, two subsequent television programs had links to the show. A website pointed out the connections:

A year and a half later in 1953, NBC premiered the family sitcom, My Son Jeep, using the same musical score as Higgins and in one episode, it was mentioned that the Roberts family were neighbors to the Allison Family. More directly, [there was] Our Man Higgins starring Stanley Holloway as the butler to the McRoberts family.
