= Clarice Blackburn =

American actress (1921–1995)

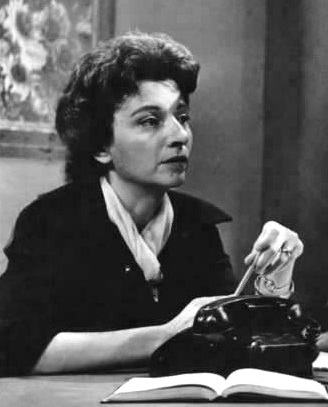
- Blackburn in 1962
- Born: February 26, 1921; San Francisco, California, U.S.
- Died: July 5, 1995 (aged 74); New York City, U.S.
- Occupations: Actress, writer

Clarice Blackburn (February 26, 1921 – August 5, 1995) was an American actress and writer best-known for playing three characters on the cult series Dark Shadows.

== Early years ==
Clarice Blackburn was born in San Francisco, California, but because her father was a salesman, Blackburn and her family moved around a great deal and made their home in Wisconsin, Arizona, Louisiana, and Texas after California.

Blackburn earned a Bachelor's Degree in speech and drama at the Texas State College for Women. She studied acting at HB Studio.

== Career ==
Blackburn's professional debut came in a production of The Circle of Chalk (1947) on Martha's Vineyard. She appeared in an Equity Library Theater production of The Great Big Doorstep in 1950 before she understudied Eva Gabor in The Happy Time on Broadway. In 1953–1954, Blackburn portrayed, to critical acclaim, Addie in American Gothic at the Circle in the Square.

Blackburn appeared on Broadway in Desk Set (1955). Her other stage credits included a lead role in a 1953 revival of The Glass Harp. She performed off-Broadway at Phoenix Theatre in The Infernal Machine (1958); and on Broadway in Juno (1959), The Miracle Worker (1961), off-Broadway in The Queen and the Rebels (1965), and on television in Good Day! (1965). During the 1965–66 season, Blackburn won an Obie Award for Distinguished Performance as Sara Calendar in Good Day / The Exhaustion of Our Son's Love.

Blackburn had extensive experience acting in soap operas. She appeared in the CBS soap opera Love of Life in the early 1960s. She played Theodora Rostand on NBC's soap opera The Doctors (1965–66), then moved on to ABC's Dark Shadows in the fall of 1966 and over the course of the next four years would play three different characters: Mrs. Sarah Johnson, Abigail Collins, and Minerva Trask.

When Blackburn's appearances on Dark Shadows began to lessen, she gladly accepted the opportunity to create the role of Mary Lou Northcote on the CBS soap opera The Secret Storm during the first half of 1970. Blackburn made a few additional appearances on Dark Shadows, making her final appearance in September 1970. Even before she made her final appearance on Dark Shadows, she signed a long-term contract to play Amy Snowden on CBS's Where the Heart Is, a role she played until the series left the air in 1973.

Blackburn moved over to One Life to Live on ABC playing Hattie Frederichs, then back to CBS to As the World Turns playing Marion Connelly, R.N. and finally to Guiding Light where she played Edith Spurrier. In addition to the soaps, Blackburn guest starred in an episode of The Eternal Light entitled "A Field of Buttercups" in 1969 and on a Saturday morning children's special, Toby, in 1970. She also guest starred in an episode of the late night TV series Directions. During the 1974–1975 season, Blackburn guest-starred in at least five episodes of the CBS Radio Mystery Theater series.

In addition to acting on soap operas, Blackburn was a writer for Love of Life and was part of the writing staff of All My Children that twice won the Daytime Emmy Award for Outstanding Drama Series Writing Team. In 1960, Blackburn appeared in the DuPont Show of the Month's production of Ethan Frome. Later that year, she called that appearance, "the one night on that little black box that did more for me than all the years I've spent in show business." Blackburn's other prime time TV credits include guest roles on The Defenders, The Nurses, East Side/West Side, Armstrong Circle Theatre, Dupont Show of the Month, The United States Steel Hour, Robert Montgomery Presents, The Big Story, Kraft Theatre, Studio One, N.Y.P.D., and the 1967 Xerox TV drama special The Crucible.

Blackburn appeared in the motion pictures The Violators (1957), Pretty Poison (1968), Night of Dark Shadows (1971), and Man on a Swing (1974). Blackburn was asked to bring her Dark Shadows character, Mrs. Johnson, to the big screen in House of Dark Shadows (1970), but at the time she was under contract to The Secret Storm and her schedule on the soap was too heavy for her to get away for the filming. The role was instead played by actress Barbara Cason, who was married to Dark Shadows actor Dennis Patrick.

== Death ==
On August 5, 1995, Blackburn died of cancer in her Manhattan home at age 74.

== Filmography ==
Year	Title	Role	Notes
1957	The Violators	Eva Baumgarden	
1968	Pretty Poison	Mrs. Bronson	
1971	Night of Dark Shadows	Mrs. Castle	
1974	Man on a Swing	Mrs. Brennan	(final film role)
