= Frank Maxwell =

American actor

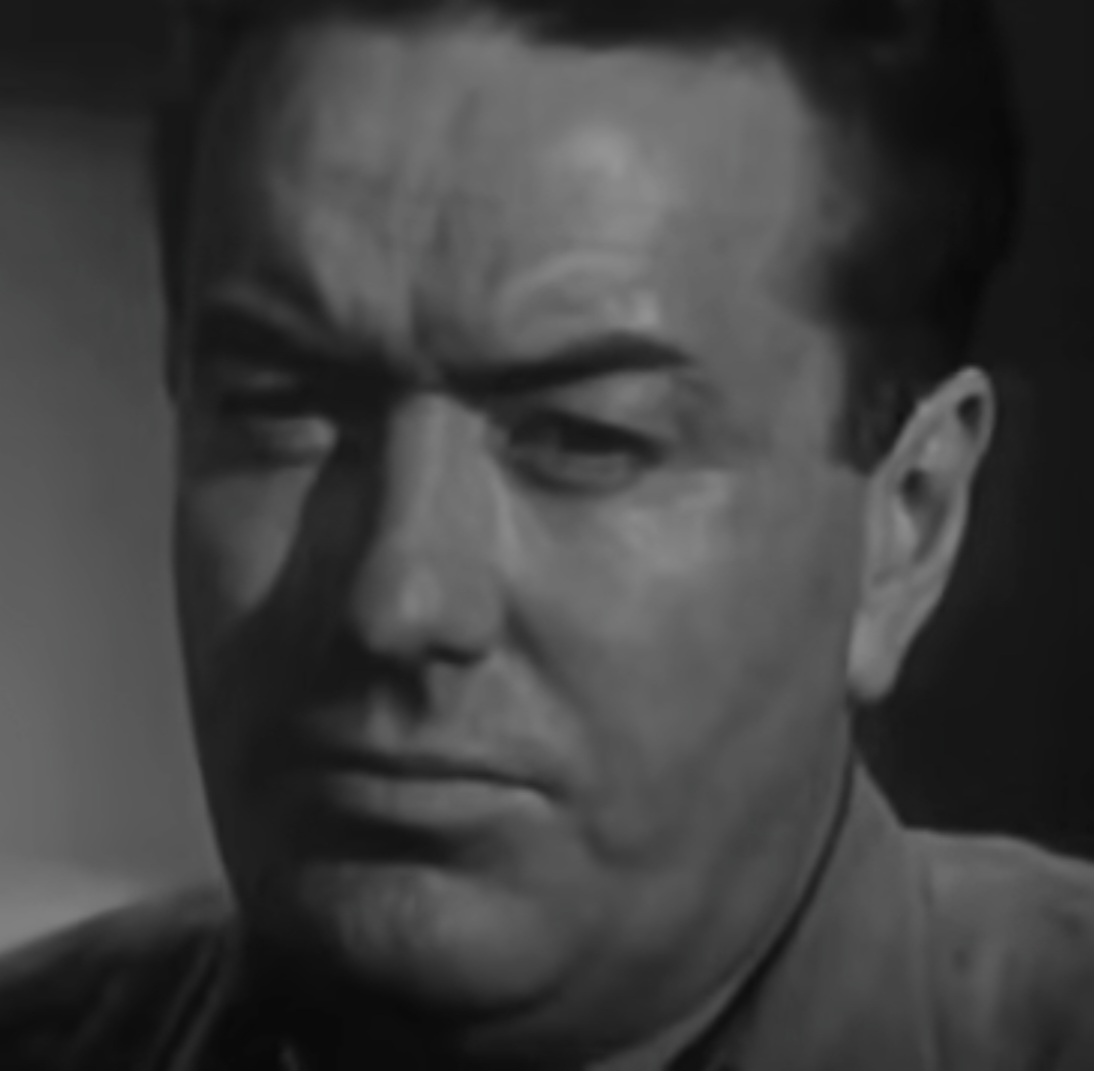
- Maxwell in an episode of One Step Beyond (1959)
- Born: Charles Francis Maxwell; November 17, 1916; The Bronx, New York, U.S.
- Died: August 4, 2004 (aged 87); Santa Monica, California, U.S.
- Resting place: Holy Cross Cemetery, Culver City, California
- Education: University of Michigan
- Occupations: Actor, AFTRA Union president, 1984–1989
- Years active: 1939–1995
- Children: 1

Charles Francis Maxwell (November 17, 1916 – August 4, 2004) was an American actor who served as president of the American Federation of Television and Radio Artists from 1984 to 1989.

== Life and career ==
A native of The Bronx borough of New York City, and a graduate of the University of Michigan, he appeared in 151 films or television programs. Maxwell began his acting career on the Broadway stage, appearing in such notable plays as Death of a Salesman (playing the role of Willy Loman's son, "Happy"), South Pacific (playing "Luther Billis," a role that went to Ray Walston in the film version), and Stalag 17. His first television acting roles were in 1950 in episodes of the Goodyear Playhouse/Philco Playhouse followed in 1951 by an appearance in the episode "The Overcoat" of the television series Big Town.

Maxwell subsequently appeared in such series as Decoy with Beverly Garland, Peter Gunn (twice), Alfred Hitchcock Presents (five episodes), The Fugitive (three episodes), Whirlybirds, Black Saddle, The Man and the Challenge, The Deputy, The Munsters, Cain's Hundred, Follow the Sun, Hong Kong, The Asphalt Jungle, Target: The Corruptors, and Mr. Novak. He was cast three times each on Robert Montgomery Presents, Cannon, and Emergency! and four times each on Rawhide; Quincy, M.E.; and The F.B.I.

In 1960, Maxwell was cast in CBS's science fiction series, The Twilight Zone as Marty Fisher in the episode "A World of Difference". That same year, he appeared as Hackett in the episode "Millionaire Jessica March" of the CBS fantasy drama, The Millionaire. In 1960 he made two guest appearances on Perry Mason: as Harry Wilson in "The Case of the Wayward Wife," and defendant Joe Dixon in "The Case of the Red Riding Boots." He made a third appearance in 1961 as Dr. Mooney in "The Case of the Injured Innocent."

In the 1962–1963 television season, he was a co-star of the ABC sitcom, Our Man Higgins, starring Stanley Holloway in the title role and with Audrey Totter and Ricky Kelman. Maxwell played the father, Duncan MacRoberts, in all thirty-four episodes of the series. He also appeared as a regular on the TV series The Felony Squad with Howard Duff from 1966–68 and The Second Hundred Years with Monte Markham from 1967-68.

In 1970, he appeared as a producer in “That Girl”.

From 1973 to 1975, he appeared in five episodes of CBS's Barnaby Jones, with Buddy Ebsen. In 1977, he appeared an in episode of ABC's The Feather and Father Gang; he also appeared on All in the Family in the role of Tommy Kelsey, owner of Kelsey's Bar, a role originated by actor Brendan Dillon in Season 2, that had been assumed on a recurring basis by he and actor Bob Hastings in Seasons 1-6, in Part 1 of the two-part Season 8 opening episode "Archie Gets The Business". In 1984, he appeared in a two-part episode of ABC's The Love Boat, in which he was cast as Colonel Charles Holmsey. His last regular acting role was as Dan Rooney, the lovable aging hospital administrator on General Hospital which he appeared on from 1978-1988. Over the years, the character had a hand in practically every storyline and was a major participant in the now famous "Ice Princess" storyline which dominated the daytime ratings in 1981.

He died in Santa Monica, California, and was buried in Holy Cross Cemetery, Culver City, California.

== Selected filmography ==
Year	Title	Role	Notes
1957	The Violators	Sam	
1958	Lonelyhearts	Pat Doyle	
1959	Alfred Hitchcock Presents	Roger	Season 5 Episode 10: "Special Delivery"
1959	Steve Canyon	Major Barr	Episode: "Sabotage"
1960	Alfred Hitchcock Presents	Maury Berg	Season 5 Episode 34: "Cell 227"
1960	Alfred Hitchcock Presents	Mr. Lyle Stern	Season 6 Episode 4: "The Contest for Aaron Gold"
1960	The Mountain Road	Sergeant Ballo	
1960	The Great Impostor	Tirdell	Uncredited
1961	Alfred Hitchcock Presents	Lieutenant Roman	Season 7 Episode 1: "The Hatbox"
1961	By Love Possessed	Jerry Brophy	
1961	Ada	Ronnie Hallerton	
1962	Alfred Hitchcock Presents	Rudy	Season 7 Episode 23: "Profit-Sharing Plan"
1962	The Horizontal Lieutenant	Colonel Frank Delgan	Uncredited
1962	The Intruder	Tom McDaniel	
1962	Pressure Point	Bund Meeting Speaker	Uncredited
1963	The Haunted Palace	Dr. Marinus Willet / Priam Willet	
1964	The Alfred Hitchcock Hour	Officer Petrie	Season 2 Episode 24: "The Gentleman Caller"
1965	A Rage to Live	George Jay	Uncredited
1965	Gomer Pyle - U.S.M.C.	Raymond Thomas	Season 1 Episode 16: "Dance, Marine, Dance"
1966	Madame X	Dr. Evans	
1966	The Wild Angels	Preacher	
1966	Bewitched	Sanford Stern	Season 2 Episode 33: "Divided He Falls"
1970	Adam-12	Phil Watters	Season 2, Episode 20: " The Bomb"
1974	Mr. Majestyk	Detective Lieutenant McAllen	
1977–1989	General Hospital	Dan Rooney	498 episodes
1977	M*A*S*H	Lt. Col. Harold Beckett	Season 5 Episode 16: "Ping Pong"
1981	The Chosen	Radio Announcer	
