= The Dennis O'Keefe Show =

- Genre: Comedy
- Created by: John Fenton Murray
- Written by: John Fenton Murray; Robert Fisher; Alan Lipscott
- Directed by: Don Weis; Abby Berlin
- Starring: Dennis O'Keefe; Hope Emerson; Ricky Kelman; Eloise Hardt; Eddie Ryder
- Theme music composer: Leon Klatzkin
- Composer: Leon Klatzkin
- Country of origin: United States
- Original language: English
- No. of seasons: 1
- No. of episodes: 32

Production
- Producer: Les Hafner
- Cinematography: Kit Carson
- Editors: Frank Capacchione; Herbert Smith
- Running time: 30 minutes
- Production companies: Cypress Productions, Inc.

Original release
- Network: CBS
- Release: 22 September 1959 – 14 June 1960

The Dennis O'Keefe Show is an American sitcom produced by Cypress Production/United Artists Television that aired on CBS for sponsor General Motors' Oldsmobile division. It was not a ratings success during its original run and was canceled after one season. The series was largely forgotten until a "Best Of" DVD release by Alpha Video during 2004. Certain episodes of the show can also be seen at the Internet Archive. It appears this series has entered the public domain.

== Premise ==
Dennis O'Keefe portrays Hal Towne, a widower who is trying to balance his career as a newspaper columnist ("All Around Towne") and raise his 9-year-old son, Randy, in an apartment in New York City, with the help of a tough but lovable housekeeper, Amelia Sargent, better known as "Sarge", played by Hope Emerson.

The series aired at 8 p.m. Eastern on Tuesdays, with competition from the last half of two hour-long western series, Laramie on NBC and Sugarfoot and Bronco, alternating on ABC, one of their many Warner Brothers offerings at that time.

== Cast ==
- Dennis O'Keefe as Hal Towne
- Hope Emerson as Amelia "Sarge" Sargent
- Ricky Kelman as Randy Towne
- Eloise Hardt as Karen Hadley
- Eddie Ryder as Eliot

== Episodes ==
No.	Title	Directed by	Written by	Original release date
1	"Hal's TV Date"	Norman Abbott	Robert Fisher & Alan Lipscott	September 22, 1959
2	"Teacher's Pest"	Don Weis	John Fenton Murray	September 29, 1959
3	"Moon Man"	Abby Berlin	Unknown	October 6, 1959
4	"On Stage, Sarge"	Unknown	Unknown	October 13, 1959
5	"Lancer, Come Home"	Unknown	Unknown	October 20, 1959
6	"Like Father, Like Son"	Unknown	Unknown	October 27, 1959
7	"Frame That Painting"	Unknown	Unknown	November 3, 1959
8	"Superior Woman"	Unknown	Unknown	November 10, 1959
9	"Bum's Bush"	Unknown	Unknown	November 17, 1959
10	"There Goes the Groom"	Unknown	Unknown	November 24, 1959
11	"It's Only Money"	Abby Berlin	Robert Fisher & Alan Lipscott	December 1, 1959
12	"The Marriage of Babette Benoit"	Unknown	Unknown	December 8, 1959
13	"Maid to Order"	Unknown	Unknown	December 22, 1959
14	"Private Eyewash"	TBA	TBA	TBA
15	TBA	TBA	TBA	TBA
16	TBA	Unknown	Unknown	January 5, 1960
17	"The Hottest Kids in Town"	Unknown	Unknown	January 12, 1960
18	"Cypress Grade School"	Unknown	Unknown	January 26, 1960
19	"I Like It"	Unknown	Unknown	February 2, 1960
20	"Follow That Mink"	Unknown	Unknown	February 9, 1960
21	"How Many Scoops?"	Unknown	Unknown	February 16, 1960
22	"Author, Author"	Don Weis	John Fenton Murray	March 1, 1960
23	"Go Home Aunt Millie"	Unknown	Unknown	March 8, 1960
24	"Enemy Father"	Unknown	Unknown	March 15, 1960
25	"A Beau for Sarge"	Unknown	Unknown	March 29, 1960
26	"The Regency Club"	Don Weis	John Fenton Murray	April 5, 1960
27	"Dimples"	Don Weis	Robert Fisher & Alan Lipscott	April 12, 1960
28	"Child Genius"	Don Weis	Alan Lipscott & Bob Fisher	April 19, 1960
29	"Send This Boy to Camp"	Unknown	Unknown	April 26, 1960
30	"Marriage, Anyone?"	Unknown	Unknown	May 3, 1960
31	TBA	TBA	TBA	TBA
32	"June Thursday"	Don Weis	Si Rose & Seaman Jacobs	May 10, 1960

== Home release ==
Alpha Video released a budget DVD containing four episodes on November 23, 2004.
