= WUBC =

Television station in Greensboro, North Carolina (1967–1970)

- Greensboro, North Carolina; United States
- Channels: Analog: 48 (UHF)

Programming
- Affiliations: Independent

Ownership
- Owner: WEAL, Inc.

History
- First air date: November 6, 1967
- Last air date: July 25, 1970

Technical information
- ERP: 558 kW
- HAAT: 386 m (1,267 ft)
- Transmitter coordinates: 36°13′00″N 79°54′28″W

WUBC (channel 48) was an independent television station in Greensboro, North Carolina, United States, which broadcast from 1967 to 1970. Originally owned by Piedmont Triad TV and later by WEAL, Inc., owner of radio station WEAL (1510 AM), it operated from studios at 1013 Warehouse Street and a transmitter at Summerfield, North Carolina. WUBC was ultimately a financial failure that forced WEAL into bankruptcy and led to an auction of that station five years later.

== History ==
Piedmont Triad TV—a company controlled by Ralph C. Price, a former president of the Jefferson Standard Life Insurance Company—applied to the Federal Communications Commission (FCC) in 1966 for a new television station on Greensboro's ultra high frequency (UHF) channel 48. The construction permit for the station was granted on March 8, 1967.

After several delays, some caused by rains affecting construction of the tower, WUBC began broadcasting on November 6, 1967. Programs at launch included a late night local talk show, Triad Tonight, as well as movies and syndicated shows. WEAL and WPET personality Tommy Parker also hosted a show.

The television station was transferred from Piedmont Triad TV to WEAL, Inc., in 1969; Price and Carroll G. Ogle were the only principals in both companies. In November of that year, WUBC filed an application with the FCC challenging the license of WGHP in High Point, in an effort to move to the more desirable very high frequency (VHF) channel.

In June 1970, plans were presented to refocus WUBC as a "local news and sports station" alongside the appointment of a new sales manager. On July 23, WEAL, Inc., presented a petition for bankruptcy with $71,000 in assets against $342,000 in liabilities. The station left the air after July 25 for what was described initially as a temporary pause due to financial and technical issues. At least one provider of syndicated programming sued for non-payment. In early 1971, Piedmont Triad TV joined WEAL in bankruptcy; it had no assets and more than $700,000 in debt.

WEAL briefly analyzed returning the station to operation by September 1970, but no resumption of broadcasting took place. In December, trustee William Zuckerman declared that the panorama for WUBC potentially returning to the air was "very dark"; not only were there engineering problems, but even in 1970, six years after the All-Channel Receiver Act came into effect, there were still too many VHF-only television sets in the region for channel 48 to be financially viable. Meanwhile, a WUBC objection to a transmitter site change and facility improvement for WBTV in Charlotte was successful; an FCC hearing examiner found that letting WBTV move to a new site in Denver, North Carolina, would have an adverse effect on WUBC and "impair, if not totally frustrate" the development of UHF television in the Triad.

The debt incurred in the WUBC venture carried WEAL, an otherwise profitable radio station, to the auction block. In 1974, WEAL was auctioned, as were two lots consisting of the tower site and tower for WUBC. The winning bidder for the radio station never paid, and a second auction was held in 1975 to dispose of the radio station. Channel 48 in Greensboro would later be used by a new and unrelated station, WGGT, in May 1981.
