= Intelsat III F-2 =

Geostationary communications satellite

- Mission type: Communications
- Operator: COMSAT for Intelsat
- COSPAR ID: 1968-116A
- SATCAT no.: 03623
- Mission duration: 5 years (planned); 1 1/2 years (achieved)

Spacecraft properties
- Spacecraft type: Intelsat III
- Bus: Intelsat
- Manufacturer: TRW
- Launch mass: 293 kg
- Dry mass: 151 kg
- Power: 183 watts

Start of mission
- Launch date: 19 December 1968, 00:32:00 GMT
- Rocket: Delta M
- Launch site: Cape Canaveral, LC-17A
- Contractor: NASA

End of mission
- Deactivated: Mid-1971

Orbital parameters
- Reference system: Geocentric orbit
- Regime: Geostationary orbit (Now supersynchronous)
- Longitude: 24.0° West

Transponders
- Capacity: 2 transponders
- Coverage area: Global

Intelsat III F-2 was a communications satellite operated by Intelsat. Launched in 1968 it was operated in geostationary orbit at a longitude of 24 degrees west for around eighteen months.

== Spacecraft ==
The second of eight Intelsat III satellites to be launched, Intelsat III F-2 was built by TRW. It was a 293 kg (646 lb) spacecraft, with its mass reducing to 151 kg (333 lb) by entry into service as it burned propellant to reach its final orbit. The satellite carried an SVM-2 apogee motor for propulsion and was equipped with two transponders powered by body-mounted solar cells generating 183 watts of power. It was designed for a five-year service life.

== Launch ==
The launch of Intelsat III F-2 made use of a Delta M rocket flying from Launch Complex 17A at the Cape Canaveral Air Force Station. The launch took place at 00:32 GMT on 19 December 1968, with the spacecraft entering a geosynchronous transfer orbit. Intelsat III F-2 subsequently fired its apogee motor to achieve geostationary orbit. It was operated at a longitude of 24° west, over Brazil; however it ceased operations after only a year and a half in orbit, in mid-1971.

== Orbit ==
Intelsat III F-2 remains in a graveyard orbit as an orbital debris. As of 7 February 2014, it was in an orbit with a perigee of 38,438 km (23,884 mi), an apogee of 39,317 km (24,430 mi), inclination of 13.73° and an orbital period of 26.60 hours.

== See also ==
- 1968 in spaceflight
