= Eloise Hardt =

American actress (1917–2017)

- Hardt in 1959
- Born: Florence Eloise Hardt; September 17, 1917; Lawton, Oklahoma, U.S.
- Died: June 25, 2017 (aged 99)
- Occupation: Actress
- Years active: 1941–1987
- Spouses: Hans Habe (m. 1948; div. 1959) Paul McNamara (m. 1972)
- Children: Marina Habe

Florence Eloise Hardt (September 17, 1917 – June 25, 2017) was an American film and television actress.

== Life and career ==
Hardt was born in Lawton, Oklahoma, the daughter of a Cherokee mother and German father. When she was 13, her family settled in California, where she later worked as a model. She was photographed by Tom Kelley which led to her meeting John Huston. He helped Hardt garner a contract at the Columbia Pictures. She began her career in 1941, first appearing in the film You Belong to Me.

She played uncredited roles in numerous films and made a guest-starring appearance in the anthology television series Alfred Hitchcock Presents. In 1959, she starred in the new CBS sitcom television series The Dennis O'Keefe Show playing Karen Hadley.

Hardt guest-starred in television programs including Charlie's Angels, Dr. Kildare, The Donna Reed Show, Dynasty, Death Valley Days, Lawman, Perry Mason, Columbo, and Hotel (her final credit). She played Rita Beacon in the daytime soap opera Days of Our Lives.

== Death ==
Hardt died on June 25, 2017, at the age of 99.
