= The Second Hundred Years (TV series) =

American television series

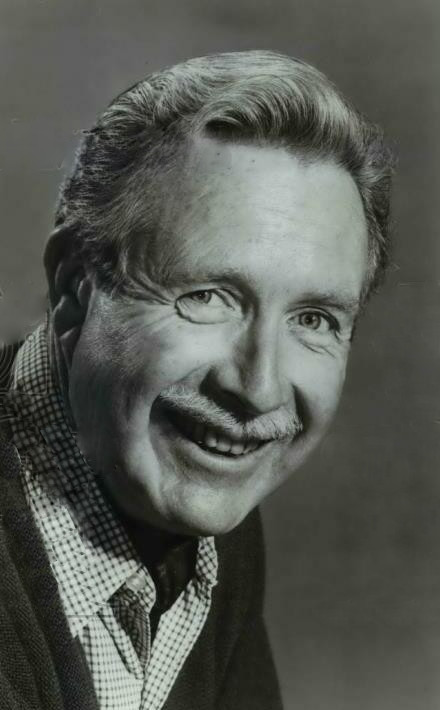
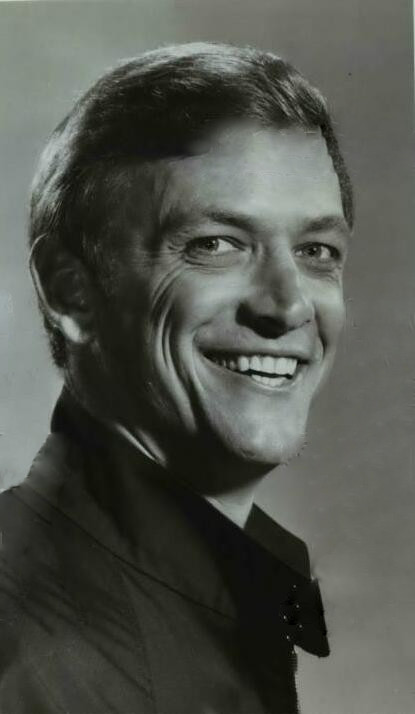
- Arthur O'Connell and Monte Markham
- Genre: Sitcom
- Created by: Roswell Rogers; Ed Simmons
- Written by: Stan Cutler; Peggy Chantler Dick; Robert Lees; Ed Simmons; Gene Thompson; Skip Webster
- Directed by: John Erman; Paul Junger Witt; Richard Kinon
- Starring: Monte Markham; Arthur O'Connell; Frank Maxwell
- Theme music composer: George Duning
- Composers: George Duning; Van Alexander
- Country of origin: United States
- Original language: English
- No. of seasons: 1
- No. of episodes: 26

Production
- Executive producer: Harry Ackerman
- Producers: Richard M. Bluel; Bob Claver
- Running time: 30 minutes
- Production company: Screen Gems

Original release
- Network: ABC
- Release: September 6, 1967 – March 28, 1968

The Second Hundred Years is an American sitcom by Screen Gems starring Monte Markham, Arthur O'Connell, and Frank Maxwell, which aired on the ABC television network for one season from September 6, 1967, to September 19, 1968.

== Synopsis ==
In 1900, Luke Carpenter left his wife and infant son to take part in the Alaskan gold rush, but soon after his arrival was buried in a glacial avalanche. His burial was evidently so complete and so rapid that he survived in a state of suspended animation for 67 years. He was then thawed out and brought to the home of his now-elderly son, Edwin (Arthur O'Connell), who lives in Woodland Oaks, California. Though Luke was 101 years old, he looked to be the same age as his 33-year-old grandson, Ken.

In the pilot episode, a heavily bandaged Luke awakens in Edwin's house and thinks Edwin is a gold robber. After removing his bandages, a bearded Luke dons his prospector's outfit and grabs his rifle in an attempt to find the sheriff to report the robber, but accidentally turns on a TV, which is playing a western. Luke comments, "There's a midget in a box challenging me to a duel," and attacks the TV set. Outdoors, Luke, thinking he is in turn-of-the-century Fairbanks, is confused and scared by automobiles, as well as people's strange fashions. Accidentally pointing a rifle at a woman gets the attention of the police, who return him to Edwin. Starting to grasp what has happened, Luke decides to assimilate to 1967 California by shaving off his beard and wearing more modern clothes, which makes him look very much like his grandson Ken (also played by Markham). After some confusion, Luke decides it is best not to burden his family and strikes out on his own by taking a train to San Francisco, but is stopped by Edwin, who convinces his father to live with him, and they will take a flight to San Francisco to help show that Luke has been given a unique gift: a chance to see the fruits of his generation's sacrifices through the advances of the latter 20th century. The army officer who oversaw Luke's unfreezing holds Luke, Edwin and Ken to a state secrecy act, as the army does not wish for this to be public until the medical corps can fully comprehend why Luke survived. When told the order came from the top, Luke responds, "if President McKinley says so it is good enough for me!"

The humor centered around how Luke was younger, both in appearance and attitude, than both his son, who was 67 (referenced in the pilot), and his grandson Ken, who at 33 was the exact age at which Luke had disappeared and been preserved, and who was a near double for his grandfather (not surprising, as both characters were portrayed by Markham). Difficulty adjusting to all of the technology of the modern era aside, Luke, who was an affable, light-hearted sort, was in some ways more at home in his new world than Edwin. Other times it would play on how both men had buttoned-down ways, but how Luke is treated differently than Edwin for it, such as when Luke considers remarrying and courts a young woman by taking her out on a date in a horse and buggy, for which he is treated as an old-fashioned romantic.

== Cast ==
- Monte Markham as Luke and Ken Carpenter
- Arthur O'Connell as Edwin Carpenter
- Frank Maxwell as Col. Garroway

== Reception ==
The series drew overwhelmingly negative reviews, but premiered with strong ratings. By October, however, the series dropped to the bottom 25. In March 1968, the series was moved to Thursday nights (replacing Batman) but was canceled by ABC a little more than a week later.

== Episodes ==
No.	Title	Directed by	Written by	Original release date
1	"Father, Dear Father, Come Home with Me Now"	Jud Taylor	Ed Simmons	September 6, 1967
Luke Carpenter is found after being buried in ice for 67 years, having not aged, after being thawed out. The news is a shock to his son, who had long thought him dead, as well as to Luke himself, who awakens to find a bizarre new world.
2	"Oh Dad, Oh Dad, They Thawed Out Grandpa and I'm Feeling So Sad"	Richard Kinon	Ed Simmons	September 13, 1967
Luke, a dead-ringer for his grandson Ken, poses as him during a date, antagonizes Ken's boss and also ends up in jail.
3	"Little Lady X"	Richard Kinon	Peggy Chantler Dick & Douglas Dick	September 20, 1967
Luke runs into trouble with both the Internal Revenue Service and the local zoning laws when he brings home a pair of goats, and then attempts to build a pen to hold them.
4	"Pay Dirt"	Richard Kinon	James Henerson	September 27, 1967
At the funeral of one of his former prospecting buddies, Luke meets his old girlfriend Annie. The two soon discover an old deed for a valuable San Francisco hotel property, which could make her rich.
5	"A Simple Son of the Soil"	Richard Kinon	Martin Ragaway	October 4, 1967
Luke takes an aptitude test in an attempt to become a businessman, but after it is determined that he would do best as a stagecoach driver or buffalo scout, his son develops a plan to improve his job prospects.
6	"Ungathered Moss"	Gene Reynolds	Stan Cutler & Martin Donovan	October 11, 1967
Luke takes the place of Ken in his job at the bank. Unfortunately, Luke is unfamiliar with some of the tools of the trade and inadvertently locks a bank official in the vault.
7	"On Bended Knee"	Bob Claver	Stan Cutler & Martin Donovan	October 18, 1967
Luke falls in love with a female flower child, who happens to be Col. Garroway's daughter and is attracted to his old-fashioned way of doing things, a relationship that almost leads to marriage.
8	"Just Pay the Two Dollars"	John Erman	Ron Friedman	November 1, 1967
Luke is mistaken for a burglar while helping an elderly woman find her poodle. After he is given a suspended sentence, he insists on clearing his name by finding the real burglar.
9	"Remember the Maine"	Richard Kinon	Stan Cutler & Martin Donovan	November 8, 1967
After a series of failed jobs, Luke decides to join the Navy. Colonel Garroway sees this as a chance for increased medical studies and is determined to get Luke into the Army, offering four candidates in exchange for him.
10	"A Couple of Sad Dads"	Richard Kinon	Lila Garrett & Bernie Kahn	November 15, 1967
Luke and Edwin are both under the mistaken impression that each of them has only a short time to live, which results in both trying to keep that information away from the other.
11	"No Experience Necessary"	Claudio Guzmán	Stan Cutler & Martin Donovan	November 22, 1967
Luke begins to sell aluminum siding, not knowing the deceptive practices of this particular business. After he makes a $400 sale, the buyer's daughter demands a refund when no delivery date is indicated.
12	"San Juan Hill"	John Erman	Skip Webster	November 29, 1967
Luke insists on testifying as an eyewitness at a hearing on the events at San Juan Hill in order to set the record straight on the heroics of Annie Longstreet's grandfather, his old friend.
13	"Luke Alikes"	Richard Kinon	Lila Garrett & Bernie Kahn	December 6, 1967
A historian from the Smithsonian Institution arrives to speak with Luke, but he is out boating with Marcia, so Ken undergoes the physical preceding the interview, and then concludes Luke's date with Marcia.
14	"Let My People Go-Go"	Bob Claver	Gene Thompson	December 13, 1967
After Luke sees a go-go dancer in a cage, he thinks she is a hostage, so he frees her and takes her home. She calls her boss, but he suggests staying there in order to garner publicity.
15	"Luke's First Christmas"	Paul Junger Witt	S : Douglas Dick; S/T : Peggy Chantler Dick	December 20, 1967
Luke takes a job as a department store salesman to earn money for Christmas, but after his honesty proves to be a failure, he becomes the store's Santa Claus.
16	"The Abnormal Iceman"	Richard Kinon	J. E. Selby (aka Robert Lees) & Stanley H. Silverman	December 27, 1967
A group of gangsters kidnap Ken, thinking that he is Luke, so that he can show them the "process" of freezing a fellow gangster who looks to go into hiding for 20 years. The search for Ken leads to the Happy Hills Sanitarium.
17	"Tree-In"	John Erman	Lila Garrett & Bernie Kahn	January 3, 1968
Luke attempts to help a young boy save his favorite tree, which includes the boy's treehouse, after it is scheduled to be chopped down by the Department of Sanitation.
18	"Right of Way"	Richard Kinon	John O'Dea & Jay Simms	January 10, 1968
Luke ignores a "no fishing" sign at his favorite boyhood fishing spot, leading to a battle with tycoon Langston Barnes over who actually owns the property involved.
19	"For Whom the Drums Beat"	Bob Rosenbaum	Skip Webster	January 17, 1968
To show solidarity with his Native American friends, Luke takes part in a picket march to protest against an Army general.
20	"The House That Needed a Carpenter"	John Erman	S : Douglas Dick; S/T : Peggy Chantler Dick	January 24, 1968
An armed Luke barricades himself with an elderly couple on their property in order to save it from being torn down to build a golf course.
21	"Shine On, Harvest Moonshine"	Paul Junger Witt	Gene Thompson	January 31, 1968
Luke and old-timer Henry Sykes decide to build a still and enter the business of bootlegging, unaware that it is illegal.
22	"Love on the Double"	Richard Kinon	J. E. Selby (aka Robert Lees) & Stanley H. Silverman	February 7, 1968
Luke pretends to be Ken during a date, but the situation gets more complicated when it turns out that the woman is pretending to be her cousin.
23	"Dude Hand Luke"	Richard Kinon	Stan Cutler & Martin Donovan	February 21, 1968
When Luke goes to work on a ranch, he and the foreman vie for the affections of their lovely boss.
24	"Lucky Luke"	Russ Mayberry	Stan Cutler & Martin Donovan	February 28, 1968
While attempting to help a woman get her poker losses back, Luke himself gets outsmarted.
25	"A Different Kind of Bug"	Richard Kinon	Stan Cutler & Martin Donovan	March 21, 1968
Luke becomes involved in a war of electronic bugging devices after being victimized in a back injury scam.
26	"Luke and Comrade Tanya"	Richard Kinon	S : Douglas Dick; S/T : Peggy Chantler Dick	March 28, 1968
Luke alarms Col. Garroway when he befriends an attractive Russian woman and her alleged uncle.
