= Are We Changing Planet Earth? =

- Programme title card
- Also known as: The Truth About Climate Change
- Genre: Nature documentary
- Directed by: Nicolas Brown
- Presented by: David Attenborough
- Composer: Samuel Sim
- Country of origin: United Kingdom
- Original language: English
- No. of episodes: 2

Production
- Executive producer: Sacha Baveystock
- Producer: Jeremy Bristow
- Running time: 60 minutes
- Production companies: BBC Natural History Unit; Open University

Original release
- Network: BBC One
- Release: 24 May – 1 June 2006

Related
- Climate Change: Britain Under Threat (2007)

Are We Changing Planet Earth? and Can We Save Planet Earth? are two programmes that form a documentary about global warming, presented by David Attenborough. They were first broadcast in the United Kingdom on 24 May and 1 June 2006 respectively.

Part of a themed season by the BBC entitled "Climate Chaos", the programmes were produced in conjunction with the Discovery Channel and the Open University. They were directed by Nicolas Brown and produced by Jeremy Bristow. The music was composed by Samuel Sim.

Attenborough undertook the assignment in between his 'Life' series Life in the Undergrowth and Life in Cold Blood. Around the same time, the naturalist also narrated Planet Earth.

== Background ==
Attenborough had confessed to previously being sceptical about the belief that global warming is predominantly caused by humans. But now, he argued, the evidence of it was too overwhelming to ignore. He became sure of it when he saw graphs provided by climatologists that demonstrated the link between increasing temperatures and the levels of carbon dioxide (CO_{2}) in the atmosphere, with the growth in population and industrialisation:

I was absolutely convinced this was no part of a normal climatic oscillation which the Earth has been going through and that it was something else.

Throughout his television career, Attenborough had, by and large, purposely avoided specific references to the effect of humans on the ecology of the planet. He saw his role simply as a presenter of programmes on natural history. However, the final episode of The Living Planet (1984) had been devoted to man's own habitat and his destruction of others, and in later years, Attenborough started to become more outspoken about the subject. The three-part State of the Planet in 2000, and the last instalment of The Life of Mammals (2002), which dealt with the evolution of Homo sapiens and subsequent overpopulation, was explicit in this regard.

Attenborough acknowledged that the tone of the "Climate Chaos" programmes was more forthright than most of those in which he had previously appeared:

It's true to say these programmes about climate change are different, in that previously I have made programmes about natural history, and now you could say I have an engaged stance. The first is about the fact that there is climate change and that it is human-induced. So I'm glad that the BBC wanted some clear statement of the evidence as to why these two things are the case.

Although the two programmes represent Attenborough's personal take on global warming, he backs up his arguments with findings from leading scientists and climatologists. The first instalment investigates the effects and probable causes of the phenomenon, and the likely outcome if things remain unchecked. The second looks at the future in more detail and discusses mitigating actions that can be taken. Computer graphics are used to demonstrate how the atmosphere is polluted by day-to-day activities that human beings take for granted.

== Are We Changing Planet Earth? ==
This is our planet: planet Earth. It contains an astonishing variety of landscapes and climates. Since life began, around 4,000 million years ago, it has gone through extraordinary changes in its climate and in the species that live on it. But now it seems that our planet is being transformed – not by natural events, but by the actions of one species: mankind.

— David Attenborough's opening narration

=== Effects ===
"…Man has an unprecedented control over the world and everything in it. And so, whether he likes it or not, what happens next is very largely up to him." He notes that when he spoke those words he could have had no idea that man might have unleashed forces that are now altering the Earth's climate. The naturalist highlights several meteorological and climatological catastrophes: Hurricane Katrina, the collapse of glaciers in Greenland, drought in the Amazon River, forest fires in Australia, and one of Europe's hottest summers (that caused 27,000 deaths). He wonders if, somehow, there is a connection between these events. Scientists all over the world are linking the changes in the Earth's weather to a global rise in temperatures. The actual figure is just 0.6 °C since 1900, but this is only an average. For example, the Arctic has warmed by up to 3 °C, and this threatens its whole ecosystem. A team has been surveying polar bears in the region for the last 25 years, and over that time, the animals have declined in number by a quarter. Each year the Arctic ice is also now melting three weeks earlier. The overall rate of glacier melt is accelerating: in southern Greenland, the amount of ice flowing into the sea has doubled in a decade, resulting in a rise of sea levels. This is exacerbated by the increase in temperatures, which causes oceans to expand. When Hurricane Katrina struck New Orleans, the sea temperatures of the Gulf of Mexico and the Atlantic Ocean were the highest ever recorded. In addition, the 2005 hurricane season was the worst ever. Scientists who have studied such severe weather warn that from now on hurricanes in the area will be more intense, more destructive and possibly more frequent. Also in 2005, the Amazon region suffered its worse drought in 60 years, decimating local fish populations. Six months later, trees have still not recovered. The abnormally warm seas in the Atlantic had disrupted the rainfall in the forest and for similar reasons, coral reefs are also at risk, leading to the phenomenon of coral bleaching.

=== Causes ===
Attenborough points out that because of natural forces, the Earth's temperature has been fluctuating for millions of years, long before humans arrived. However, it is the additional carbon dioxide, leading to an increase in the greenhouse effect, which must also be taken into account. When fossil fuels are burnt, such as coal, fuel oil or natural gas, the carbon emissions combine with oxygen to further thicken the Earth's atmospheric 'blanket' and thus warm the planet. An analysis of ice cores can provide information from thousands of years ago. Comparisons of carbon dioxide levels show that those of today are far beyond anything seen in the past. The scientists interviewed are convinced that humans are responsible.

=== The future ===
Scientists cannot predict changes to the climate with much certainty – but they can anticipate the likelihood that they will occur. Attenborough visits the Met Office in Exeter to learn their conclusions. Their findings include several factors, and allow for natural climate change as well as man-made carbon dioxide emissions. A graph shows that up until around 1970, the variance in Earth's temperatures was largely due to inherent anomalies, but from then on there is a marked escalation, which can only be explained by human activity. A computer model reveals that, for example, the 2003 European heat wave – by present reckoning a 1 in 200 years event – will be something that occurs every other summer by 2040, and by 2080 would be considered to be cool weather. Attenborough is wholly persuaded:

We're all involved in this: our whole way of life is structured around the burning of fossil fuels. I find it sobering to think that while I've been travelling the world, trying to record the complexity and beauty of our planet, that I too have been making my own contribution to global warming. As I recognised when I presented Life on Earth all those years ago, we are a flexible and innovative species and we have the capacity to adapt and modify our behaviour. Now we most certainly have to do so if we're to deal with climate change. It's the biggest challenge we have yet faced.

== Can We Save Planet Earth? Yes or No? ==
=== Likely changes ===
Attenborough starts the second programme by looking at potential future events, before warning that what happens over the next few years is crucial. A BBC weather forecast for the year 2050 shows that summer temperatures of 38 °C for the UK are "par for the course". The probable range by which the planet will warm over the next century is between 1.4 °C and 5.8 °C. Or, says Attenborough, "to put it another way, the impact of global warming will be somewhere between severe and catastrophic." The naturalist is invited to watch a film that illustrates regional change over the next 100 years. A 2 °C rise for the south of England, for example, may not seem to be much but that is not all there is to it. Rainfall is also predicted to be more intense and storms could be five times more frequent than they are at the moment. This makes extreme events, such as the 2004 Boscastle flood, much more likely. Current defences for severe wind or rain will shortly become inadequate. Even Hurricane Katrina, with the devastation it caused, is described as "not particularly powerful". In Australia, a new approach is needed to combat brush fires after the hottest year on record. If the Amazon tropical rainforest were to disappear, not only would an entire ecosystem vanish, but a valuable way of cooling the planet would go as well. Meanwhile, the glaciers continue to melt: one scientist reveals that an area the size of Texas has been lost over the last 20 years. Attenborough is told that a warming of 2 °C is inevitable, as a consequence of our actions over the last 25 years, but whether or not we end up at 6 °C is still very much within our control.

=== Domestic pollution ===
Every year humans add 25 billion tons of carbon dioxide to the atmosphere, and over half of it comes from their domestic activity. Attenborough introduces the Carbons, a fictional family occupying an average Western suburban house near a city. Their electrical requirements are supplied via fossil fuels. As Attenborough points out, the Carbons are not bad people, but as Westerners, they have one of the most energy-hungry lifestyles on the planet. They are a two-car household, and each vehicle emits 10 tons of CO_{2} over the course of a year. The power used to run the Carbons' home and all its comforts translates into a similar amount. Much of the family's plentiful food supply will have crossed continents by the time it reaches their kitchen, and will have added a tenth to their annual emissions. Yet more are produced by their refuse: buried in a landfill, it heats up as it decomposes and releases greenhouse gases. Mr Carbon's business trips by air contribute to the fastest growing source of CO_{2}. The combined total of the Carbons' yearly air pollution is 45 tons.

Also shown are Mr and Mrs Tan, a fictional couple who live in an average Chinese suburb. At present, their energy usage is one seventh of that of the Carbons. However, this is set to change. As China becomes more industrialised, its emissions are set to overtake those in the West. As of 2006, the country is planning to build a large, coal-fired power plant every week for the next seven years.

=== Reducing emissions ===
The challenge is to freeze emissions at their current level:

- Household solutions
  - Turning heating down by a few degrees
  - Turning off televisions and similar equipment instead of leaving them in 'standby'
  - Composting vegetable waste
  - Buying locally grown food to save on transporting it
  - Using energy-efficient lighting
  - Insulating homes properly
  - Using a gas cooker instead of an electric one
- Driving more fuel-efficient cars
- Using more public transportation
- Tripling the world's nuclear power
- Scaling up renewable energy, such as solar and wind power
- Pumping back emissions to below the sea bed

The world is waking up to climate change, and everyone has a part to play in halting it. If the Greenland ice cap were to melt, the sea would flood much of south-east Britain, including central London. It would take just a 5-metre rise to drown most of Florida and leave Miami 50 miles off shore. A similar deluge would wipe Bangladesh off the map. Worldwide, 150 million people could be displaced within 50 years.

In the past, we didn't understand the effect of our actions. Unknowingly, we sowed the wind and now, literally, we are reaping the whirlwind. But we no longer have that excuse: now we do recognise the consequences of our behaviour. Now surely, we must act to reform it: individually and collectively; nationally and internationally – or we doom future generations to catastrophe.

— David Attenborough, in closing

== DVD ==
A Region 2 DVD entitled The Truth About Climate Change (EKA40264) featuring both documentaries was released by Eureka Video on 23 June 2008.

== Related documentaries ==
- An Inconvenient Truth: a film that showcases Al Gore's presentation on global warming, arguing that humans are the cause of climate change.
- The 11th Hour: a 2007 documentary film, created, produced and narrated by Leonardo DiCaprio, on the state of the natural environment.

== See also ==
- Energy use and conservation in the United Kingdom
