= Paraphlebia hyalina =

Scientific classification
- Kingdom: Animalia
- Phylum: Arthropoda
- Clade: Pancrustacea
- Class: Insecta
- Order: Odonata
- Suborder: Zygoptera
- Family: Thaumatoneuridae
- Genus: Paraphlebia
- Species: P. hyalina

Binomial name
- Paraphlebia hyalina Brauer, 1871

Species of damselfly

Paraphlebia hyalina is a species of damselfly native to Mexico.
