= The Life of Mammals =

2002 Nature documentary

- Region 2 DVD cover
- Genre: Nature documentary
- Presented by: David Attenborough
- Composers: Dan Jones; Ben Salisbury
- Country of origin: United Kingdom
- Original language: English
- No. of episodes: 10

Production
- Executive producer: Mike Salisbury
- Running time: 50 minutes
- Production company: BBC Natural History Unit

Original release
- Network: BBC One
- Release: 20 November 2002 – 5 February 2003

Related
- The Life of Birds; Life in the Undergrowth

The Life of Mammals is a nature documentary series written and presented by David Attenborough, first transmitted in the United Kingdom from 20 November 2002.

It is a documentary on the study of the evolution and habits of the various mammal species. It was the fourth of Attenborough's specialised surveys following his major trilogy that began with Life on Earth. Each of the ten episodes looks at one (or several closely related) mammal groups and discusses the different facets of their day-to-day existence and their evolutionary origins. All the programs are of 50 minutes duration except the last, which extends to 59 minutes.

The series was produced by the BBC Natural History Unit in conjunction with the Discovery Channel. The executive producer was Mike Salisbury and the music was composed by Dan Jones and Ben Salisbury. It was later shown on the Discovery Channel.

Part of Attenborough's Life series, it was preceded by The Life of Birds (1998) and followed by Life in the Undergrowth (2005). However, in between the former and this series, Attenborough presented State of the Planet (2000) and narrated The Blue Planet (2001).

== Background ==
The mammals are such a widespread, varied and successful group of animals that Attenborough had previously devoted no fewer than five episodes of Life on Earth to them. Nevertheless, there was much that remained untold and behaviour that was not hitherto filmed. The Life of Mammals was intended to be his definitive account of the subject.

Attenborough took on the series at the suggestion of the BBC Natural History Unit. The naturalist's wife, Jane, had died in 1997, midway through the making of The Life of Birds, which had caused its postponement. However, Attenborough had been grateful for the fact that there was still work to be done to ensure its completion. Similarly, he was glad of another opportunity to keep himself occupied:

The Life of Birds was transmitted in the autumn of 1998, and was sufficiently well received for the Unit to ask me if I would like to tackle another similar series about another group of animals. How about mammals? I was in my mid-seventies, but I decided I would rather do that than sit at home by myself.

== Production ==
Despite his age, Attenborough travelled just as extensively as in all his previous productions, with each episode leapfrogging to a multitude of locations around the world.

The filming, as ever, provided many challenges. To capture footage for the first time of skunks foraging in a cave of bats, extra protective measures had to be taken for the crew, as it was a very hostile environment. The air was full of ammonia, the main occupants urinated copiously from above, and other inhabitants included flesh-eating maggots and a rattlesnake.

For a sequence featuring grizzly bears at close quarters, the camera team were accompanied by Buck Wilde, an ursine specialist. When a bear was too inquisitive, he was able to command it to turn away simply by raising his hands. However, a cameraman confessed that at the time, he was sure there would come a moment when the animal would just continue towards them regardless.

To get themselves up into the canopy of a tropical rainforest the crew used a catapult to fire a fishing line 100 metres into the uppermost branches. This was then attached to a rope and pulley counterbalance system. The difficulties involved were first actually finding an ideal tree, and then, having settled on one, watching out for passing snakes and primates en-route to the top.

Big cats that hunt nocturnally, such as lions, leopards and tigers, had never been extensively filmed doing so before. But the latest infrared technology revealed behaviour that had previously been guessed at from evidence discovered the next day.

The series was among the first to benefit from the features of digital television. After each episode's transmission on BBC One, terrestrial viewers were shown a ten-minute featurette on an aspect of its making. Those with digital equipment had the option of switching to an interactive quiz, hosted by Attenborough.

== Themes ==
In his previous natural history series, Attenborough had been reticent about describing man's impact on the natural environment (unless it was relevant to the content, as in the last episode of The Living Planet or The First Eden). However, since State of the Planet, the presenter had become more publicly outspoken on the subject. In the final program of this series, "Food for Thought", he took the opportunity to put the case explicitly for finding ways to deal with overpopulation.

== Episodes ==
"Warm-bloodedness is one of the key factors that have enabled mammals to conquer the Earth, and to develop the most complex bodies in the animal kingdom. In this series, we will travel the world to discover just how varied and how astonishing mammals are."

— David Attenborough, from episode one

No.	Title	Original release date
1	"A Winning Design"	20 November 2002
The coat of the Arctic fox (Vulpes lagopus) both provides it with protection from the cold and camouflages it. The first episode gives a general overview of mammals before moving on to monotremes and marsupials. Attenborough begins in the high Arctic, where he contrasts the Arctic fox's ability to live there all the time (thanks to its dense coat of fur) with his own need for protective clothing, despite them both being mammals. From there, he travels to Australia to illustrate the evolution of the species with the help of the echidna and the platypus. Both creatures, unlike all other mammals, lay eggs – similar to birds and reptiles – and have been around for 100 million years. With an optical probe, the inside of a platypus nest is able to be shown for the first time. The defining characteristic of a marsupial is its pouch, inside which its young develop, having been born externally. Kangaroos and koalas are two examples that inhabit a warm environment, while the wombat demonstrates its ability to withstand a cold climate. Red kangaroos, in particular, are more at home in arid, desert-like conditions, while their grey cousins are sociable and prefer more temperate climes. The mammalian tongue is very adaptable, and those of numbats and honey possums have become greatly extended to enable the gathering of insects and nectar respectively. However, the most successful group of mammals are the placentals. Attenborough witnesses a wildebeest being born and explains both the dangers and advantages of this way of reproduction.
2	"Insect Hunters"	27 November 2002
This programme discusses insectivores. Shrews are descendants of the earliest mammals, which were scurrying creatures that had a diet of insects. Their warm blood enabled them to hunt at night while dinosaurs slept; they nurtured their young and gave them milk. When the dinosaurs died out some 65 million years ago, the surviving mammals' inherent features meant that they could proliferate. These shrew-like creatures evolved: the elephant shrew is shown, alongside its prepared pathway of getaway routes; while others adapted further into species of mole, including the golden mole. The increased relative size of armadillos came about because they broadened their diet. Other animals grew larger owing to more of their favoured nutrition being available: these include the giant anteater and the pangolin. However, Attenborough hails the evolution of the bat – a winged mammalian insect catcher that can navigate using echolocation – as being "magical". The European brown long-eared bat switches off its echolocation and then uses its keen sense of hearing to detect an insect's location through its movements. He ascends 3 kilometres into the night sky over Texas to investigate why there should be so many bats at such a height. It transpires that this is also heights to which moths from the Tropics climb up as they migrate. Whereas the bats in Texas are forced to migrate in winter, Attenborough visits a cave in Canada where they stay all year round and go into deepest hibernation when the cold weather arrives. In New Zealand, bats seem to have reverted to the hunting techniques of their ancestors, and are shown tackling a weta on the ground.
3	"Plant Predators"	4 December 2002
The next instalment looks at herbivorous mammals. The sloth is a leaf-eater, but it has compensated for the lack of nutriment in its diet by doing less (its reactions are a quarter the speed of a human's). This does not apply to all herbivores, which rely on bacteria in their stomachs to digest the leaves' cellulose. Plants can be poisonous, but Brazilian tapirs – the largest inhabitant of the South American rainforest – deal with them by eating a little of each species and then supplementing it with kaolin. The pika collects and stores plants to survive through the winter. In East Africa, via infrared cameras, Attenborough observes a herd of elephants squeezing into a pitch black cave and gouging the walls with their tusks to mine salt for their diet. Grazing animals, such as caribou and wildebeest, must migrate at the onset of winter and make long journeys to find new pastures. Despite its spiny fortification, the acacia is favoured by antelope, elephants and giraffes, which all have adaptations to reach its leaves. Smaller grazers are always at risk from carnivores: so they have developed the means to detect and evade them, and do so more often than may be supposed. A herd of buffalo are shown defending one of their number by charging the lions attacking it. However, the horns of antelope are primarily used for fighting each other to determine rank within their group and to maintain a breeding ground. Topi are shown doing so to the point where they are so exhausted that they easily succumb to a pack of hyenas.
4	"Chisellers"	11 December 2002
The eastern gray squirrel (Sciurus carolinensis) eats acorns of one species and stores the other more toxic (and thus longer keeping) species for winter. The fourth episode examines rodents, which are characterised by strong, sharp, continuously growing incisors. These enable the animals to eat food that others find impossible, such as nuts or wood, and have enabled them to become the most successful and numerous of all mammals. Attenborough visits the forests of Virginia, where the grey squirrels are able to differentiate between the acorns of the red oak and the white oak: eating the latter and storing the former. Seed-eaters can live almost anywhere, and the desert-dwelling kangaroo rat uses its cheek pouches to transport its supply back to its burrow. A family of beavers is shown in Wyoming. Their construction skills have enabled the building of a dam, which has given them a lake so they can safely swim and forage in the nearby woodland. Infrared cameras are installed in their lodge during winter and a pair of muskrats are revealed to be sharing it. Many rodents are nocturnal, and a porcupine is shown warning off a young leopard. The naked mole-rat is a burrower that, like bees and ants but unlike any other mammal, lives colonially with castes of individuals. Rats and mice are the largest group of rodents, comprising some 1,300 species. They reproduce rapidly: a female house mouse can become pregnant at five weeks old, and a plague of the creatures is shown exploiting a grain store. The South American mara has to eat grass on plains, but still nests in burrows. The world's largest rodent is the capybara, a semi-aquatic animal from South America.
5	"Meat Eaters"	18 December 2002
This programme is devoted to carnivorous mammals. Attenborough starts in the English countryside, where, besides humans farming sheep, a stoat chases and catches a rabbit. Meat is one of the most energy-rich foods there is, and there are several groups that eat it exclusively. Among the most prolific to do so are cats and dogs. Canine adaptations are varied, and are illustrated by the differences between fennecs and Arctic foxes. Along the coast of the Namib, a Brown Hyena family is shown hunting for fur seals and scent marking their territory. In the Amazon, lacking in large land mammals, the rare South American bush dog is shown hunting for aquatic prey. Meanwhile, the biggest concentration of meat occurs on the plains of Africa, and African hunting dogs are shown capturing a wildebeest with efficient teamwork. However, the largest wild canid is the wolf, and Attenborough successfully communicates with a pack of them in North America before they embark on an exhausting hunt for elk. Back in Africa, infrared cameras are used to examine the nocturnal activities of lions, which bring down a zebra. During the day, a solitary cheetah – the fastest animal on four legs – swiftly overtakes an impala and despatches it. One of the most adaptable of the big cats is the leopard, and infrared technology is again used to spot one of them as it searches an Indian village for domestic goats. As it does so, it comes dangerously close to the hut where Attenborough sits with his observation equipment. Finally, Attenborough visits the frozen North to witness the animal kingdom's most powerful predator, the Siberian tiger, albeit one that is held in captivity.
6	"The Opportunists"	8 January 2003
The next instalment deals with those mammals that are omnivorous. Attenborough goes to the Atlanta Zoo to see the giant panda. He contrasts its restrictive diet of bamboo with the less selective forms of nutrition favoured by other species. The raccoon is among the most successful: its sensitive hands and inquisitive nature have enabled it to become extremely adaptable. To the other extreme, one of the scarcest omnivores is the babirusa, a kind of pig found in Indonesia. A good sense of smell is vital for such creatures and wild boars have become expert foragers. Foxes have gained a reputation for killing more chickens than they need to: in fact they demonstrate foresight by burying surplus food to eat later. Skunks visit a cave of bats and cross a carpet of guano to seek out the young that fall from the ceiling. The most formidable opportunists are grizzly bears, and Attenborough observes them fishing for migrating salmon in Alaska. Their feeding habits in the lead up to hibernation are discussed in detail. The replacement of natural habitats by modern cities and the extravagance of their human occupants have provided a rich source of sustenance for many. Raccoons, bears and foxes have all become well adapted to an urban lifestyle. However, in this regard, it is the brown rat that has become most abundant. Finally, Attenborough points out that it is the opportunistic traits of humans that have enabled them to dominate the world.
7	"Return to the Water"	15 January 2003
The blue whale (mother and calf pictured) is the largest living mammal species (scale image). This episode concentrates on marine dwellers. Astride an elephant, Attenborough highlights their love of water, before moving on to those that are completely at home in it. In proportion to their size, sea otters probably have the biggest appetites of any mammal, and Attenborough swims with them off the Californian coast. Their adaptations include webbed feet, which in one way or another (as flippers) are common to all seagoing mammals. Sea lions are shown leading their young into the water for the first time, and navigating entangling beds of kelp. In Antarctica, the differences between true seals and sea lions are illustrated: the former do not have the external ears or the mobility on land of the latter. Meanwhile, in the Arctic, ringed seal pups are prey to polar bears. Other pinnipeds shown include hooded seals and harbour seals. The manatee is a grazer descended from land-living herbivores and spends its entire life in the water. Near south-eastern America, there are dolphins that specialise in synchronically "herding" fish on to the river banks before feeding. With the aid of computer animation, Attenborough walks the length of a blue whale – the largest creature on the planet – to demonstrate its vast physiology, and then travels alongside one in the open ocean. whale song, and particularly that of humpback whales, is examined. The tumultuous breeding habits of southern right whales are shown off the shores of Patagonia.
8	"Life in the Trees"	22 January 2003
The next programme surveys arboreal mammals. Attenborough's introduction takes place in the close company of meerkats. They work as a team, and one will always act as a lookout. For this it climbs to the highest point nearby, which in this instance proves to be Attenborough's shoulder. Up in the canopy of the tropical rainforest, there is a greater variety of food than anywhere else in the natural world, so it is unsurprising that many animals exist there. Sloths and coatis exemplify the skills needed to move around in such a habitat. Especially suited to ascending tree trunks are sun bears and tamanduas, the latter possessing a prehensile tail, something it has in common with the woolly monkey. The flying squirrel can leap a distance of 15 metres by virtue of the fur membrane between its wrist and ankle. A five million-strong colony of fruit bats is also shown, and little impact is made on their numbers by predatory eagles and crocodiles. Infrared cameras are again employed to study nocturnal lorises and lesser bushbabies. Their ancestral relatives reached the island of Madagascar, where they diversified and are known as lemurs. They are particularly adept at jumping, and their technique is analysed. They are hunted by the fossa, an arboreal carnivore, which is a match for them athletically. In the forests of Southeast Asia can be found the "supreme tree-traveller", the fastest flightless inhabitants of the canopy in the world: gibbons.
9	"The Social Climbers"	29 January 2003
The penultimate instalment focuses on monkeys. Together with apes (which includes humans), monkeys are part of the most social group of mammals. Their habits are rooted in relationships with others of their kind and a natural intelligence and inquisitiveness. Capuchins display all these qualities as they search for food. The differing face colours of the saki denote seniority within its group. The only nocturnal monkeys are douroucoulis and being active at night enables them to share the food resources of others in the same area. Pygmy marmosets, the smallest monkeys in the world, are captured feeding at the tops of trees and gnawing away on tree trunks to feast on the gum inside. Different tamarin species are shown co-operating to alert each other to the presence of a common predator, a tayra. Monkeys have good colour vision, and howler monkeys use it to select non-toxic leaves to eat. Attenborough travels through the African jungle with an alliance of species: several types of monkey and even mongooses combine to watch out for danger. They have a different alarm call for each enemy and Attenborough demonstrates this by placing a stuffed leopard nearby. In Sri Lanka, the naturalist also spends time with a troop of toque macaques – one of the most studied groups of monkeys in the world. It has been discovered that the creatures are born into a class system, in which position brings privileges. When the world's climate changed 10 million years ago, some monkeys ventured into open grassland, and they are illustrated by some of the most resourceful: baboons and geladas.
10	"Food for Thought"	5 February 2003
A young orangutan The final episode studies apes and the evolution of human society to its current state. In Borneo, rescued orangutans that have spent time with humans have learned to imitate their activities, and have done so entirely on their own initiative. They are shown hand-paddling a canoe, washing socks, and using a hammer and saw. In Africa, Attenborough encounters a group of orphaned chimpanzees that are being prepared for their return to the wild. Again, they display a great capacity for gaining knowledge and passing it on. A different chimp culture exists in Uganda, where a large concentration of rival males lives in an uneasy alliance that, in rare cases, can lead to extreme violence. In Tanzania, Attenborough examines some of the earliest footprints to have been left by man's upright-walking ancestors. In the Kalahari Desert, indigenous San (Bushmen) undertake a persistence hunt. It provides an illustration of how early man pursued his prey with no weapons. The domestication of cattle led to farms and then to villages. With vastly increased food supplies, the number of human beings multiplied. Ritual and the arts flourished, and villages became towns. Attenborough visits Tikal, the capital of the Maya people, who achieved sophisticated advances in architecture, mathematics and astronomy. However, the Maya could not sustain their population – and, Attenborough warns, we may be precariously close to a similar catastrophe.

"Three and a half million years separate the individual who left these footprints in the sands of Africa from the one who left them on the moon. A mere blink in the eye of evolution. Using his burgeoning intelligence, this most successful of all mammals has exploited the environment to produce food for an ever-increasing population. In spite of disasters when civilisations have over-reached themselves, that process has continued, indeed accelerated, even today. Now mankind is looking for food, not just on this planet but on others. Perhaps the time has now come to put that process into reverse. Instead of controlling the environment for the benefit of the population, perhaps it's time we control the population to allow the survival of the environment."

— David Attenborough, in closing

== DVD and book ==
The series is available in the UK for Regions 2 and 4 as a 4-disc DVD (BBCDVD1128, released 7 April 2003) and as part of The Life Collection. Its special features include six "behind the scenes" featurettes, fact files, a photo gallery, the original score and a special 10-minute video-to-music montage.

The accompanying book, The Life of Mammals by David Attenborough (ISBN 0-563-53423-0), was published by BBC Books on 17 October 2002.

Both DVD and book have been translated to other languages.

The Dutch version of the DVD produced by Evangelische Omroep removed all references to (amongst others) evolution, fossils, and continental drift. The narration by David Attenborough has been replaced by a not always accurate Dutch translation, and cuts were made to the episodes. The tenth episode was not broadcast at all on Evangelische Omroep, and is not included on the EO DVD of the series. The Dutch version of the book includes the full text of the original book, as did the Dutch language version of the programme broadcast on the Belgian broadcaster Canvas.
