= Paraphlebia zoe =

Conservation status
- Vulnerable (IUCN 3.1)

Scientific classification
- Kingdom: Animalia
- Phylum: Arthropoda
- Clade: Pancrustacea
- Class: Insecta
- Order: Odonata
- Suborder: Zygoptera
- Family: Thaumatoneuridae
- Genus: Paraphlebia
- Species: P. zoe

Binomial name
- Paraphlebia zoe Hagen, 1861

Species of damselfly

Paraphlebia zoe is a species of damselfly in the family Thaumatoneuridae. It is endemic to Mexico. Its natural habitats are subtropical or tropical moist lowland forests and rivers. It is threatened by habitat loss.
