= Paraphlebia quinta =

Conservation status
- Least Concern (IUCN 3.1)

Scientific classification
- Kingdom: Animalia
- Phylum: Arthropoda
- Clade: Pancrustacea
- Class: Insecta
- Order: Odonata
- Suborder: Zygoptera
- Family: Thaumatoneuridae
- Genus: Paraphlebia
- Species: P. quinta

Binomial name
- Paraphlebia quinta Calvert, 1901

Species of damselfly

Paraphlebia quinta is a species of damselfly species in the Thaumatoneuridae family, It is found in Central America.

According to the IUCN, it is classified as "Least Concern" (LC), indicating there is no immediate threat to its survival.
