= David Poore =

British independent musician (born 1966)

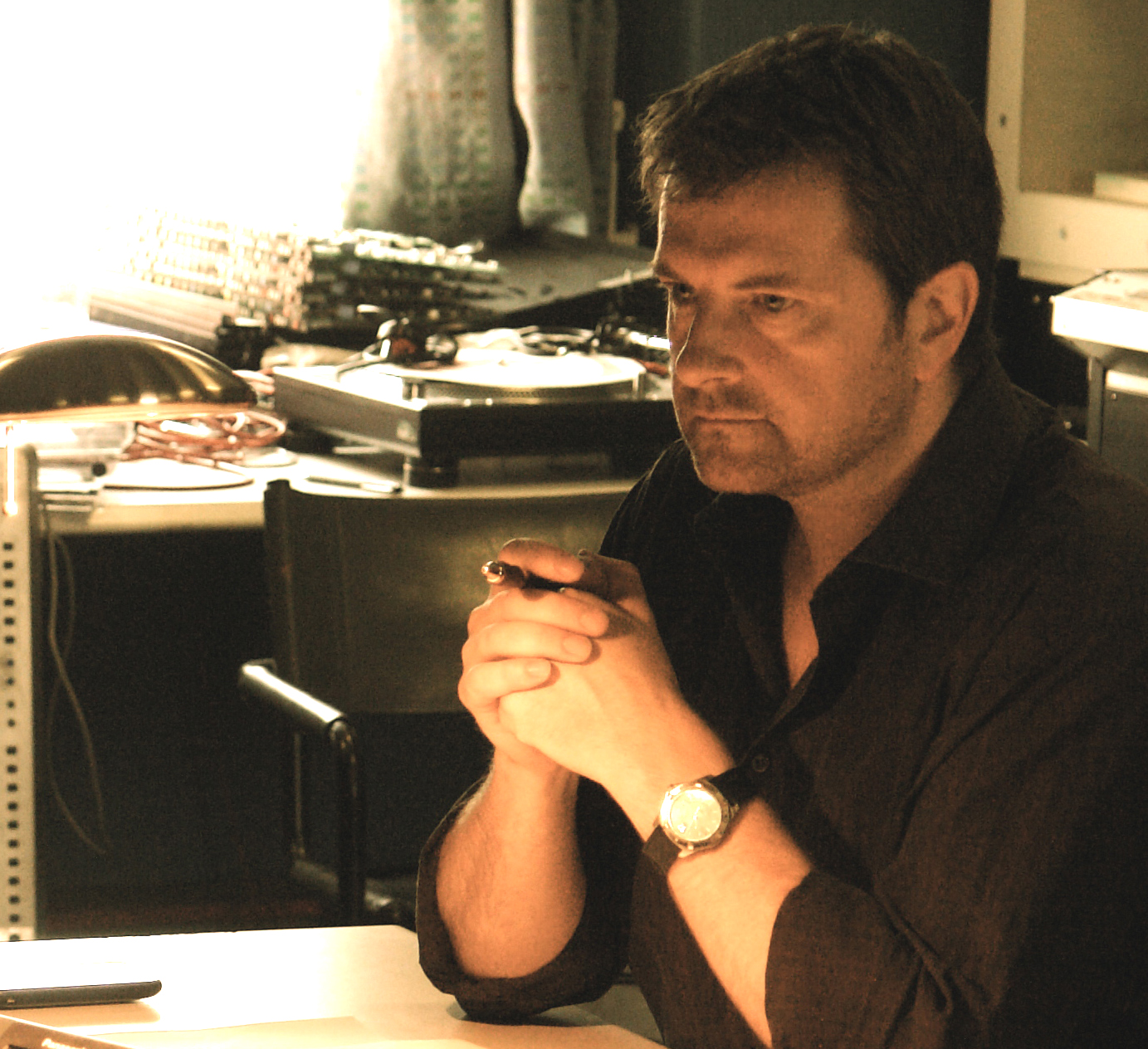
- Poore in 2011

Background information
- Born: David Nicholas Poore; 2 December 1966 (age 59); Wells, Somerset, England
- Genre: Film/television music
- Occupation: Composer
- Instruments: Drums and keyboards
- Website: www.davidpoore.com

David Nicholas Poore (born 2 December 1966) is a British independent musician, who has composed and produced music for over 200 films by the BBC, ITV, Channel 4, Disney, PBS, National Geographic, RTÉ and other broadcasters. In October 2026, Poore was sentenced at Bristol Crown Court to an 18-month community order after pleading guilty to making indecent images of children and possessing a prohibited image of a child.

== Education ==
Poore studied at Wells Cathedral School in Somerset from 1974 to 1984. While there he was a choral scholar in Wells Cathedral Choir and also studied drums and piano, playing percussion in the school orchestra for the duration of his time at Wells. He then went on to study jazz, played drums in various bands, and also became a drum teacher. He then attended Newport Film School in Wales in 1987.

== Career ==
Following several years working as a sound designer and dubbing mixer for Bristol-based TV post-production company Films At 59, Poore began his composing career in 1990 with work for the BBC Natural History Unit, and was soon providing music for two of the network's main natural history series, Wildlife on One and BBC Natural World, whilst also providing music for news and current affairs documentaries for the BBC's Nature department.

He went on to provide the score for both David Attenborough's Life in Cold Blood, winner of the BAFTA Award for Best Factual Series in 2009, and Life in the Undergrowth with fellow Bristol composer Ben Salisbury, with whom he also co-wrote The Nature of Britain series presented by Alan Titchmarsh. He wrote music for Planet Earth's accompanying conservation films Planet Earth: The Future. Poore's TV scores also include the long-running BBC series Big Cat Diary and a number of BBC nature documentaries, Orangutan Diary, Elephant Diaries, and Chimpanzee Diary with Charlotte Uhlenbroek.

=== Notable compositions ===
Poore's work on the BBC's Springwatch series earned a Royal Television Society (RTS) nomination in 2007 for the title theme (see Awards and Nominations).

He also composed for the BBC series Earth From Space together with Bristol composer Neil Davidge, with whom he also co-wrote the score for the BBC's Moon landing 50th anniversary film 8 Days: To The Moon and Back.

His music is also featured in Channel 4's Grand Designs since 2007, and Dispatches.

Poore has also written several series for children including for Disney Mr Moon, a CGI space adventure series which has aired worldwide on the Playhouse Disney Channel since May 2010, and Henry's Amazing Animals, and for the BBC Growing Up Wild.

Poore composed incidental music used in the feature film Ocean Voyager, narrated by Meryl Streep, which was subsequently performed in London by the Royal Philharmonic Orchestra.

=== Selected TV scores ===
- Score for the acclaimed ITV series In The Wild including films with Goldie Hawn, Bob Hoskins and Christopher Reeve
- BBC's The One Show
- ITV's Celebrity Fit Club
- BBC One's Omnibus
- Degas and the Dance (for PBS)
- National Geographic series Africa,
- Mountain Gorilla
- The Secret Life of Elephants
- Tales from the Green Valley

He has also written for Bristol-based Aardman Animations. Poore has recorded with orchestras and musicians from The London Philharmonic Orchestra, The BBC Concert Orchestra, and The Bristol Ensemble, to a selection of solo artists which have included Kit Morgan (guitar), Stuart Gordon (violin), Dirk Campbell (Ethnic Wind Instruments), Dan Newell (trumpet), Andy Sheppard and Will Gregory (Saxophone), Adrian Utley (guitar), Paul Clarvis (Percussion), Belinda Sykes and Abbie Lathe (vocals), recording at Abbey Road Studios and Air Edel Studios in London, and at Christchurch Studios in Bristol.

=== Additional work ===
Poore played drums for the live concert of the music for the BBC series Nature's Great Events performed by the BBC Concert Orchestra at Bristol's Colston Hall in September 2009, and narrated live by Sir David Attenborough. The music was composed by Ben Salisbury and Barnaby Taylor and conducted by William Goodchild.

Poore can also be heard on the critically acclaimed 2008 Portishead album Third, singing additional vocals on the track "Deep Water" with Ben Salisbury (collectively credited as "The Somerfield Workers Choir"), and Team Brick.

== Awards and nominations ==
In 2005 Poore's work on the film Ireland for the BBC's Natural World and PBS Nature Ireland | About | Nature | PBS earned him an Emmy Nomination for Outstanding Individual Achievement in a Craft.

He received a nomination for the Royal Television Society (RTS) Awards in 2007 for the BBC Springwatch for Outstanding Original Main Title Theme Music.

Further recognition followed at the 2008 Wildscreen Festival, where the episode "Armoured Giants" from the BBC series Life in Cold Blood, including Poore's compositions for the soundtrack, was awarded the prestigious Panda Award.

The TV series Life in Cold Blood and Life in the Undergrowth, featuring Poore's compositions, both received BAFTA recognition in 2005 and 2009.
