= Paraphlebia duodecima =

Scientific classification
- Kingdom: Animalia
- Phylum: Arthropoda
- Clade: Pancrustacea
- Class: Insecta
- Order: Odonata
- Suborder: Zygoptera
- Family: Thaumatoneuridae
- Genus: Paraphlebia
- Species: P. duodecima

Binomial name
- Paraphlebia duodecima Calvert, 1901

Species of damselfly

Paraphlebia duodecima is a species of damselfly in the family Thaumatoneuridae. It is found in Central America.
