= The Life of Birds =

BBC nature documentary series narrated by David Attenborough

- Region 2 DVD cover
- Genre: Nature documentary
- Presented by: David Attenborough
- Composers: Ian Butcher; Steven Faux
- Country of origin: United Kingdom
- Original language: English
- No. of episodes: 10

Production
- Executive producer: Mike Salisbury
- Running time: 50 minutes
- Production company: BBC Natural History Unit

Original release
- Network: BBC One
- Release: 21 October – 23 December 1998

Related
- The Private Life of Plants; The Life of Mammals

The Life of Birds is a BBC nature documentary series written and presented by David Attenborough, first transmitted in the United Kingdom on 21 October 1998.

A study of the evolution and habits of birds, it was the third of Attenborough's specialised surveys following his major trilogy that began with Life on Earth. Each of the ten 50-minute episodes discusses how the huge variety of birds in the world deal with a different aspect of their day-to-day existence.

The series was produced by the BBC Natural History Unit in conjunction with BBC Worldwide Americas Inc. and PBS. The executive producer was Mike Salisbury and the music was composed by Ian Butcher and Steven Faux. It won a Peabody Award in 1999 for combining "spectacular imagery and impeccable science."

Part of Attenborough's Life series of programmes, it was preceded by The Private Life of Plants (1995), and followed by The Life of Mammals (2002). Before the latter was transmitted, Attenborough presented State of the Planet (2000) and narrated The Blue Planet (2001).

== Background ==
In common with Attenborough's previous productions, the programmes include sequences that were filmed in many locales. The series took three years to make, involving visits to 42 countries. The subject matter had been covered before by Attenborough within Life on Earth, in an episode entitled "Lords of the Air", but now he was free to expand on it. However, by his own confession, despite being especially fascinated by one family, the birds of paradise, Attenborough was not an expert in ornithology. Nevertheless, the notion of an entire series devoted to the creatures excited him, as he would be able to not only communicate his findings to the viewing audience, but further his own knowledge as well.

From the outset, the production team were determined that the sound of birds calling and singing would not be dubbed on to the filmed pictures afterwards: it would be recorded simultaneously. To that end, meticulous care was taken not to include man-made 'noises off' from the likes of cars and aeroplanes. For one particular sequence, Britain's dawn chorus, it was important that the movement of the beak and the expelled warm air was synchronous with the accompanying song.

A trick used to entice some of the animals near the camera was to play a recording of the same species in the hope that the target would not only answer back, but investigate its source as well. This was employed in the episode "Signals and Songs", where Attenborough encouraged a superb lyrebird—one of nature's best mimics—to perform on cue. Despite such fortuity, filming on the series was not all plain sailing: in "Finding Partners", Attenborough was chased by a capercaillie, which didn't even stop when the presenter fell over.

A technique that had been previously used for The Living Planet was again called for to film greylag geese in flight. The newly hatched goslings were imprinted with a human 'mother', and, when fully grown, were able to be photographed flying alongside an open-top car. Computer animation was utilised in the first episode to illustrate extinct species, such as the terror bird and the moa.

Production was suddenly halted during a trip to New Zealand in early 1997 when Attenborough's wife, Jane, died:

The next filming trip for the Birds series was, of course, cancelled. But I could not simply abandon the series. Three quarters of the filming had been done. The film of some of the programmes had been edited but none of the commentaries had yet been written. There was a lot of work that I had to do—and I was grateful that this was so.

Segments that were shot after the passing of his wife include those in the Galápagos Islands, which were filmed in mid-1997.

== Episodes ==
Birds are the most accomplished aeronauts the world has ever seen. They fly high and low, at great speed, and very slowly. And always with extraordinary precision and control.

— David Attenborough's opening narration

=== 1. "To Fly or Not to Fly?" ===
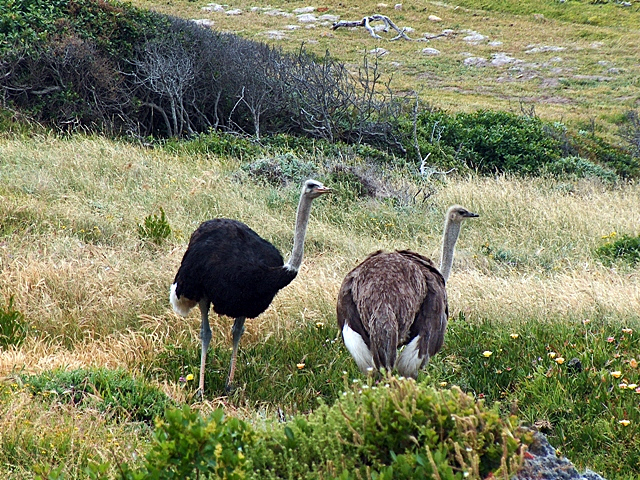
The largest bird, the ostrich (Struthio camelus), is unable to fly, due to its great size.

Broadcast 21 October 1998, the first episode looks at how birds first took to the skies in the wake of the insects. It begins in Mexico, where Attenborough observes bats being outmaneuvered by a red-tailed hawk. Pterosaurs were the birds' forerunners, some 150 million years after dragonflies developed the means of flight, but eventually became extinct together with the dinosaurs. Birds had by then already evolved from early forms like Archaeopteryx, the first creature to possess feathers. Its ancestry can be traced through reptiles, and some current species, such as the flying lizard, possibly show paths this evolution may have taken. One of the biggest birds to have ever existed was the terror bird, which proliferated after dinosaurs vanished and stood up to 2.5 metres tall. By comparison, the ostrich, while not closely related, is the largest and heaviest living bird. It was probably the evasion of predators that drove most birds into the air, so their flightless cousins evolved because they had few enemies. Accordingly, such species are more likely to be found on islands, and Attenborough visits New Zealand to observe its great variety, most especially the kiwi. Also depicted is the moa, another huge creature that is now gone. The takahe is extremely rare, and high in the mountains of New Zealand, Attenborough discovers one from a population of only 40 pairs. Finally, another example on the brink of extinction is the kākāpō, which at one point numbered only 61 individuals. A male is heard calling — an immensely amplified deep note that can be heard at great distances from its nest.

=== 2. "The Mastery of Flight" ===
Broadcast 28 October 1998, the second programme deals with the mechanics of flight. Getting into the air is by far the most exhausting of a bird's activities, and Attenborough observes shearwaters in Japan that have taken to climbing trees to give them a good jumping-off point. The albatross is so large that it can only launch itself after a run-up to create a flow of air over its wings. A combination of aerodynamics and upward air currents (or thermals), together with the act of flapping or gliding is what keeps a bird aloft. Landing requires less energy but a greater degree of skill, particularly for a big bird, such as a swan. Weight is kept to a minimum by having a beak made of keratin instead of bone, a light frame, and a coat of feathers, which is maintained fastidiously. The peregrine falcon holds the record for being fastest in the air, diving at speeds of over 300 km/h. Conversely, the barn owl owes its predatory success to flying slowly, while the kestrel spots its quarry by hovering. However, the true specialists in this regard are the hummingbirds, whose wings beat at the rate of 25 times a second. The habits of migratory birds are explored. After stocking up with food during the brief summer of the north, such species will set off on huge journeys southwards. Some, such as the snow goose, travel continuously, using both the stars and the sun for navigation. They are contrasted with hawks and vultures, which glide overland on warm air, and therefore have to stop overnight.

=== 3. "The Insatiable Appetite" ===
Broadcast 4 November 1998, the next installment focuses on dietary needs and how different species have evolved beaks to suit their individual requirements. The latter come in a multitude of forms. Blue tits and goldfinches have beaks akin to tweezers, with which to extract seeds, while the hawfinch's razor-like bill can deal with a cherry-stone. However, the crossbill is the only finch that can twist its mandibles in opposite directions. Jays store acorns for winter by burying them in the ground, whereas woodpeckers can keep up to 60,000 of them in one tree trunk. Sap is also desirable, and there are a variety of methods used to obtain it. The hoatzin is the only specialised leaf-eater, and accordingly has a digestive system more akin to that of cattle. Plants recruit birds to aid pollination, and offer nectar as a reward. hummingbirds eat little else, and the sword-bill's beak is the longest of any bird in relation to its body. Insects are also highly prized, and Galápagos finches are shown to possess some ingenuity as they not only strip bark, but also use 'tools' to reach their prey. Crows are hailed as being among the most intelligent birds, and one is shown using a twig to spear a grub within a fallen log. The robin is an opportunist, and Attenborough observes one seizing morsels as he digs a patch of earth. In South America, a cattle tyrant sits atop an obliging capybara and uses its vantage point to spot passing food that may be dislodged by its grazing partner.

=== 4. "Meat-Eaters" ===
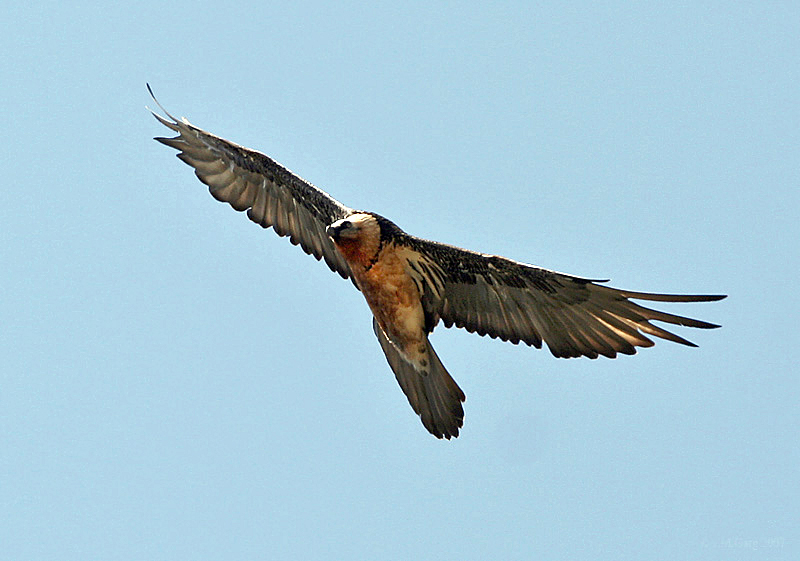
The lammergeier or bearded vulture (Gypaetus barbatus) feeds mainly on bone marrow, dropping bones from great heights to crack them.

Broadcast 11 November 1998, this episode examines those birds whose sustenance comes from flesh and their methods of hunting. In New Zealand, Attenborough observes keas, parrots that do not eat meat exclusively, raiding a shearwater's burrow for a chick. However, it is the dedicated birds of prey, such as owls, buzzards, eagles, falcons and vultures, to which much of the programme is devoted. In order to spot and pursue their victims, senses of sight and hearing are very acute. Vultures are the exception, in that they eat what others have left, and once a carcass is found, so many birds descend on it that the carrion seems submerged beneath them. The turkey vulture is an anomaly within its group, as it also has a keen sense of smell. Eagles defend their territory vigorously, and a pair of sea eagles are shown engaging in an aerial battle. The Galápagos hawk hunts marine iguanas, but can only do so when its quarry is vulnerable, during the breeding season. The African harrier-hawk has adapted to extracting burrowing animals by virtue of an especially long, double-jointed pair of legs. By contrast, a shrike is not equipped with the requisite sharp beak and talons needed for butchery, and so dismembers its kill by impaling it on the thorns of acacias. The lammergeier eats bones, and will drop them on to rocks from a great height in order to break them down to a digestible size. Also featured are the Eurasian sparrowhawk, goshawk and peregrine falcon.

=== 5. "Fishing for a Living" ===
Broadcast 18 November 1998, the next programme details river and ocean dwellers. The dipper swims completely below water to search for food, whereas the kingfisher uses a 'harpoon' technique, diving from a vantage point. However, the darter uses a combination of both methods, stalking its prey underwater before spearing it. By contrast, the reddish egret uses a kind of dance to flush out the aquatic inhabitants. Skimmers have different-sized mandibles, the lower one being used to skim the water's surface for small fish. Ducks have developed an assortment of angling skills. Some dabble, like the mallard, while others are of a more streamlined design and are at home underwater, such as the merganser. Waders, which specialise in feeding on mud flats at low tide, include avocets, godwits, dowitchers and sanderlings. The pelican feeds in groups, their pouch-like bills being more successful when used collectively. Boobies fish in the open ocean and are shown dive-bombing shoals en masse. Attenborough visits Lord Howe Island, off Australia, and by imitating the calls of various birds, invites a group of curious Providence petrels — which are indigenous — to investigate. Because there are no humans in their habitat, they are a very trusting species, as Attenborough discovers when one perches on his hand. Out on a seemingly empty area of ocean, the presenter is able to fill it with various sea birds within seconds, simply by throwing fish oil on to the water.

=== 6. "Signals and Songs" ===
Broadcast 25 November 1998, this installment describes ways of communicating. A colony of fieldfares in Sweden deters a raven from raiding a nest by collectively raising an audible alarm. However, in an English wood, all species co-operate to warn each other surreptitiously of approaching danger. By contrast, a sunbittern is shown expanding its plumage to discourage a group of marauding hawks. The members of the finch family exemplify how colour aids recognition. Birds have excellent colour vision, and the feathers of many species react to ultraviolet light. Flocking birds, such as sparrows, also have a 'ranking system' that determines seniority. In Patagonia, Attenborough demonstrates the effectiveness of sound: he summons a Magellanic woodpecker by knocking on a tree. The nature of tropical rainforests means that their occupants tend to make much louder calls than those in other habitats, and several such species are shown. Saddlebacks vary their calls so that even individuals from different areas can be identified. The dawn chorus provides a mystery, as there is still much to learn about why so many different birds sing together at the same time of day. (Proclaiming territory or attracting mates are two likely reasons.) Finally, Attenborough introduces the superb lyrebird as one of the most versatile performers: it is a skilled mimic, and this particular one imitates not only other species, but also cameras, a car alarm and a chain saw.

=== 7. "Finding Partners" ===
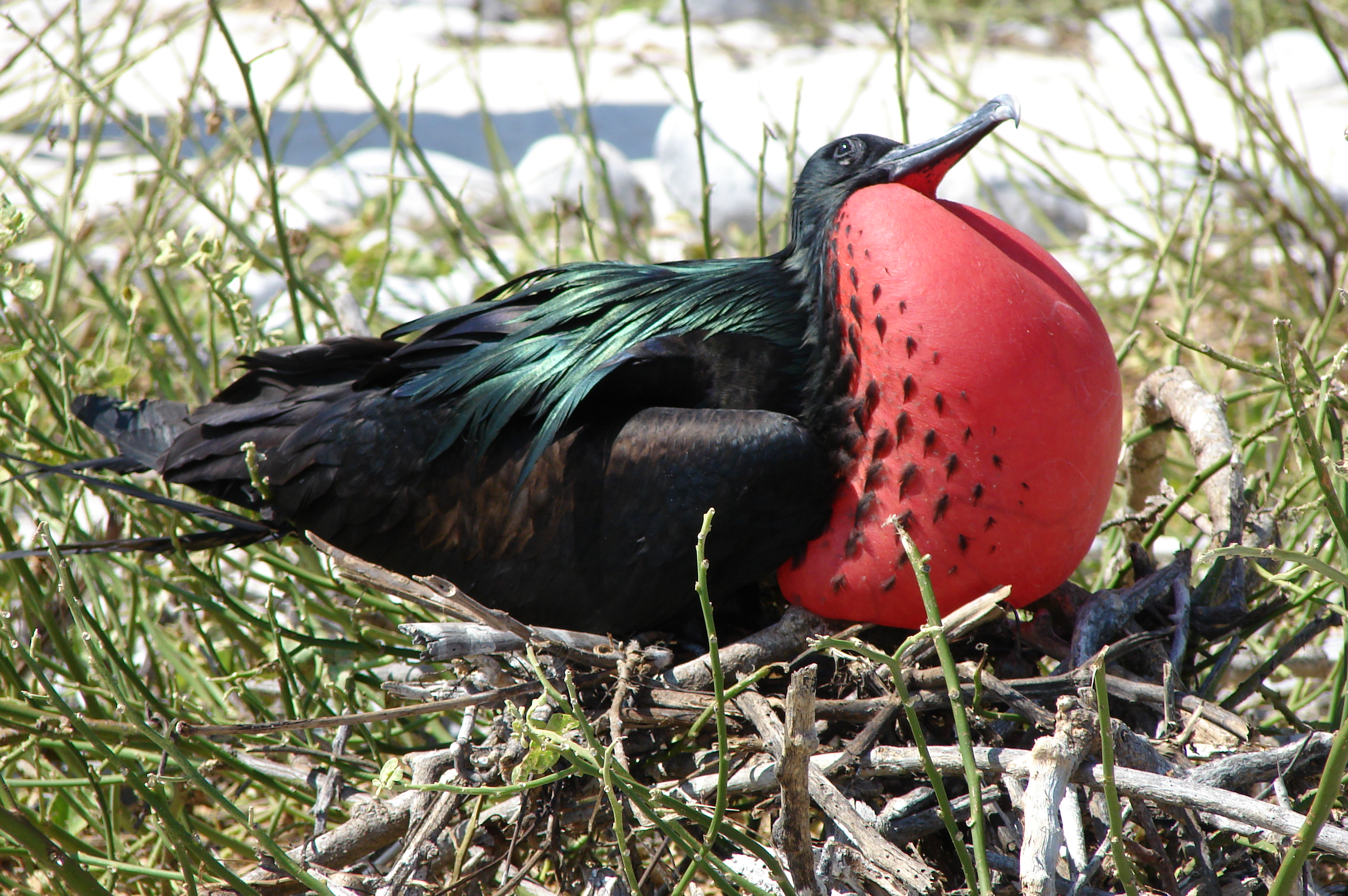
A male great frigatebird (Fregata minor) nesting on Genovesa in the Galapagos.

Broadcast 2 December 1998, this programme discusses mating rituals. If a male bird is on the lookout for a partner and has a suitable nest, it must advertise the fact, either by its call, a visual display or both. The frigatebird provides an example of the latter, with its inflated throat pouch. The hornbill's courtship, among that of many others, also runs to the offer of a gift. For some species, dancing can also be an important component, and grebes are shown performing a pas de deux. The cock-of-the-rock, which dances solo within a group, is contrasted with the team performance of the manakin. Once trust has been established between a pair, mutual preening can follow. After mating, the individuals usually remain together to rear their eventual family. The Temminck's Tragopan with its beautiful and colorful neck, the Himalayan Monal with glowing feather's colors and the huge tailed great argus to the peacock with its colorful and huge tail.

In this regard, the rhea and the phalarope are highlighted as unusual because in both instances, it is the male that incubates the eggs. Some females judge a prospective companion on its nest-building ability, and this is a conspicuous part of the weaver's behaviour. The bowerbird puts on one of the most elaborate displays: a hut-like construction, completed by a collection of objects designed to impress. Competition among males can be fierce and in Scotland, Attenborough observes rival capercaillies engaging in battle — after one of them chases the presenter. Avian polyandry is not widespread, but is illustrated by the superb fairy-wren, where the male's family can easily comprise young that it did not father.

=== 8. "The Demands of the Egg" ===
Broadcast 9 December 1998, this episode explores the lengths to which birds will go to ensure that their chicks are brought into the world. Attenborough begins on an island in the Seychelles, where sooty terns, which have hitherto spent their lives on the wing, have landed to lay their eggs. This is a necessity for birds, as eggs are too heavy to be borne in the air for any considerable length of time. It is imperative that nests are kept as far away from predators as possible, and unusual locations for them are shown, such as: behind the water curtain of Iguazu Falls in South America (as chosen by swifts), cliffs on Argentina's coast favoured by parrots, an ants' nest occupied by a woodpecker, and a tree hole inside which a female hornbill seals itself. Eggs require warmth, and some nests are insulated by the owners' feathers, others from ones found elsewhere. External temperatures dictate how the eggs are incubated. The snowy owl has to do so itself, because of its habitat; however, the maleo is able to take advantage of solar heating. The amount of eggs laid also varies: for example, the kiwi lays just one, whereas the blue tit will deposit many. Their mottled surface serves to camouflage them. Birds that steal eggs include toucans and currawongs. A number of strategies are employed to deter the thieves, as illustrated by the yellow-rumped thornbill, which builds a decoy nest atop its actual one, and the plover, which distracts marauders by feigning injury.

=== 9. "The Problems of Parenthood" ===
Broadcast 16 December 1998, the penultimate installment concentrates on the ways in which birds rear their offspring. Having successfully incubated their eggs, the moment arrives when they hatch — and then the real challenge begins: feeding the chicks. Lapland buntings and dippers are shown doing so virtually non-stop throughout the day. The Gouldian finch has a further problem in that its tree-hollow nest is dark inside, so its young have conspicuous markings inside their mouths for identification. Grebes are fed feathers with which to line the stomach, and so protect it from fish bones. Coots and pelicans are among those that turn on their own and force death by starvation if there is insufficient food. The European cuckoo tricks other species into raising its chick, but it is by no means alone in doing this. Protecting a family is also a priority, and brent geese are shown nesting close to snowy owls as a means of insurance, but as soon as the eggs hatch, they and their young must flee to avoid giving their neighbours an easy meal. The million or so sooty terns in the Seychelles prove that there is safety in numbers and the nearby predatory egrets have little success when attempting to steal. The behaviour of Arabian babblers is more akin to that of a troop of monkeys: they do everything for the benefit of a group as a whole. Eventually the day will come when flight beckons, and the grown bird will leave the nest to start a family of its own.

=== 10. "The Limits of Endurance" ===
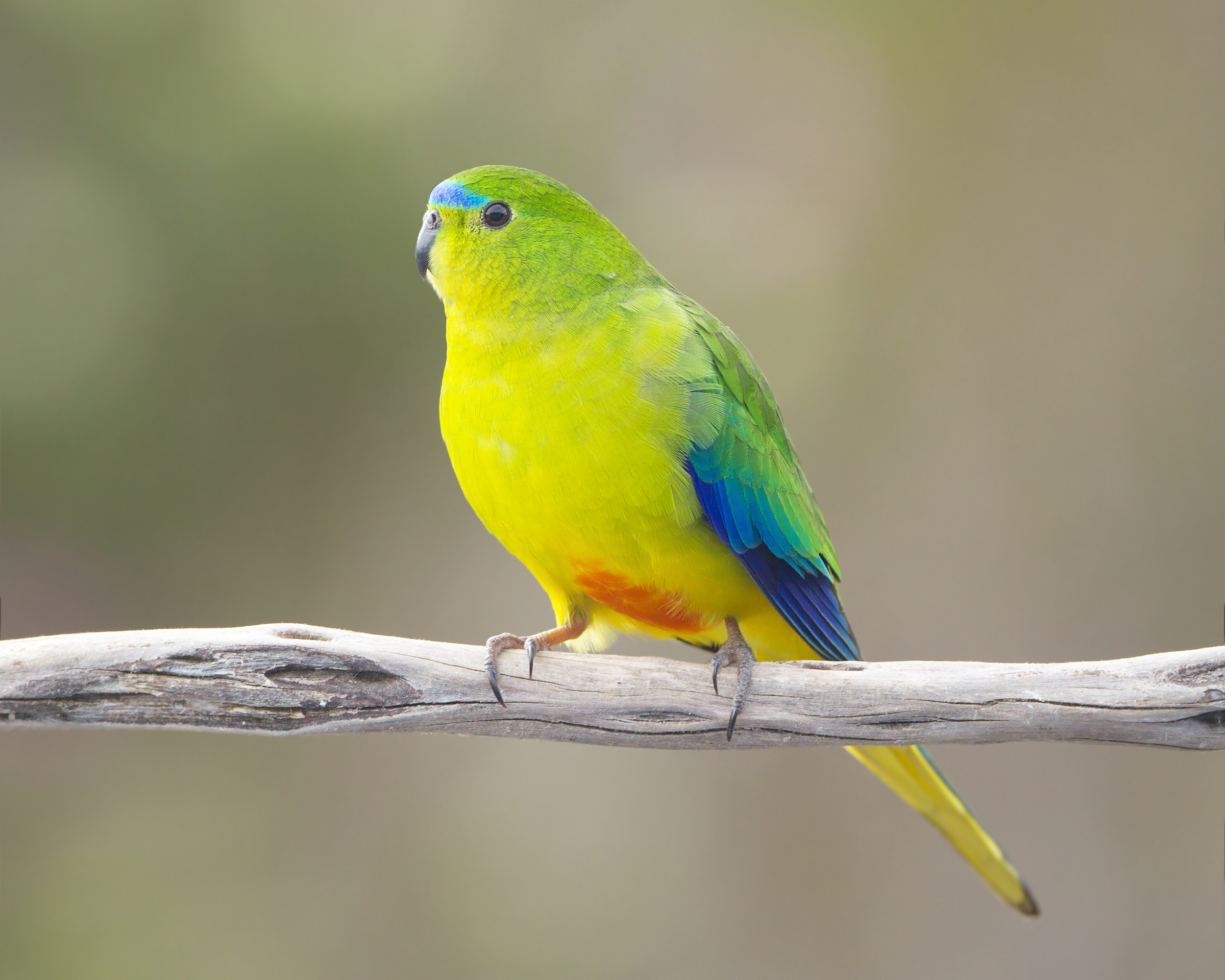
The orange-bellied parrot (Neophema chrysogaster) is a critically endangered species.

Broadcast 23 December 1998, the final programme investigates the challenges that must be surmounted if birds are to survive. The sandgrouse is a species that has adapted to desert living: its breast feathers are capable of absorbing water, which it can pass on to its young. The crab plover also nests in the sand, and burrows until it finds a comfortable temperature. Birds that choose remote places can proliferate hugely, like the flamingos on an African soda lake. Meanwhile, during winter, the entire world population of spectacled eiders can be found in just a few assemblies on patches of the Arctic Ocean. The city is a relatively recent habitat, but many have become accustomed to it, such as the American black vultures in São Paulo. In Japan, crows have learned to crack nuts by dropping them on to pedestrian crossings — and waiting for the traffic to stop before collecting them. In North America, purple martins have become totally dependent on humans for their nest sites. Attenborough highlights man's influence by describing the Pacific island of Guam, whose bird population was wiped out following the accidental introduction of brown tree snakes during the 1940s. Examples of species that were hunted to extinction are the huia, the great auk and, most famously, the dodo. However, there are conservation efforts being made, such as those for Australia's orange-bellied parrot, the pink pigeon and the echo parakeet (the latter two both of Mauritius).

Birds were flying from continent to continent long before we were. They reached the coldest place on Earth, Antarctica, long before we did. They can survive in the hottest of deserts. Some can remain on the wing for years at a time. They can girdle the globe. Now, we have taken over the earth and the sea and the sky, but with skill and care and knowledge, we can ensure that there is still a place on Earth for birds in all their beauty and variety—if we want to... And surely, we should.

— David Attenborough, in closing

== DVD and book ==
The series is available in the UK for Regions 2 and 4 as a three-disc DVD (BBCDVD1020, released 4 December 2000) and as part of The Life Collection. Each episode features additional footage, accessed separately.

The accompanying book, The Life of Birds by David Attenborough, was published by BBC Books on 24 September 1998.
