= Green Screen film festival =

Annual international wildlife film festival in Eckernförde, Germany

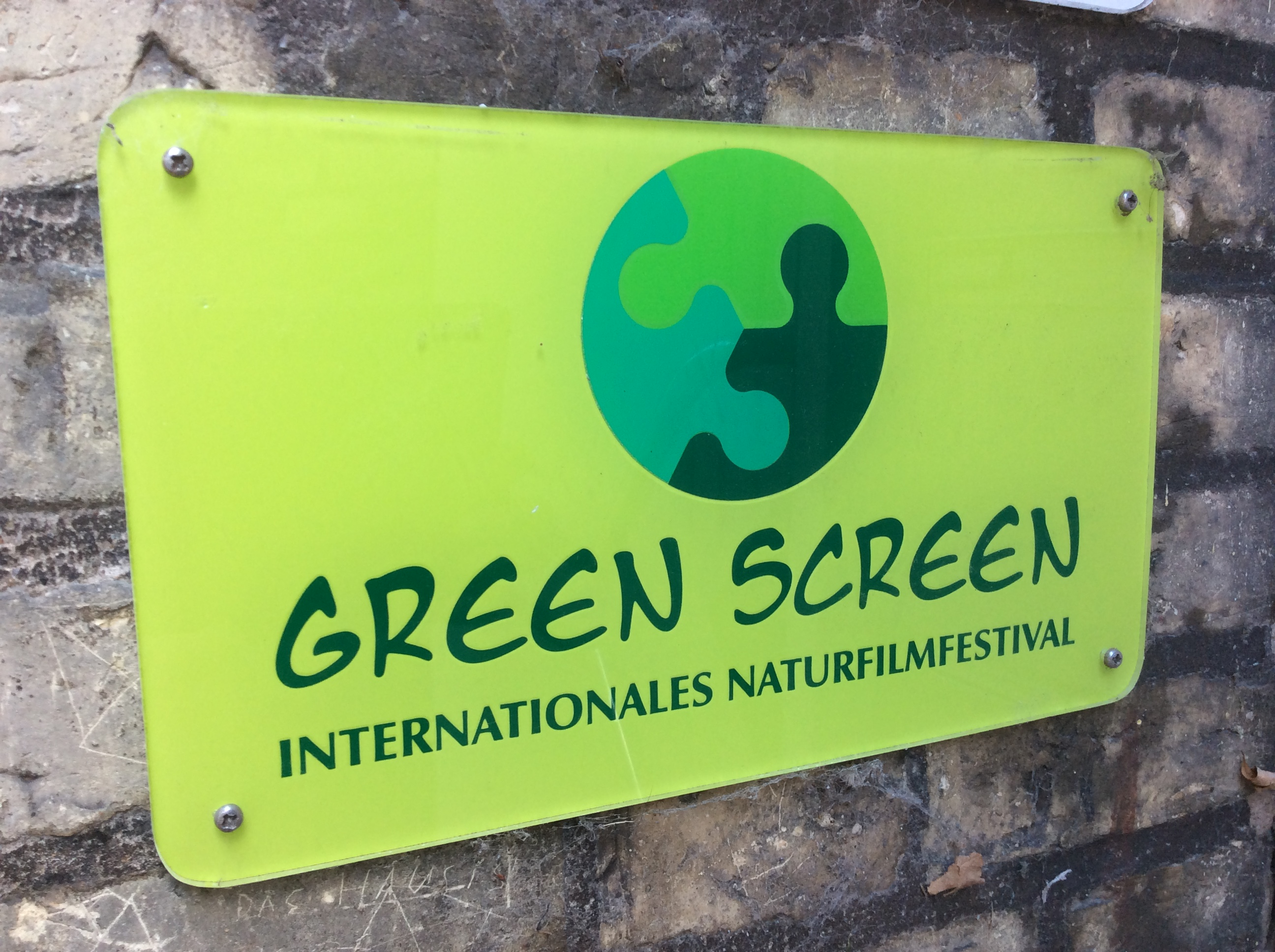
GREEN SCREEN

The Green Screen international wildlife film festival is held annually in and around Eckernförde, Germany. The festival shows full-length and short nature documentaries about animals in their natural habitat. Around 30,000 visitors make it the largest nature film festival in Europe. The awarded trophy is made of sand.

Since 2007 films are shown in cinemas of Eckernförde and on mobile screens in the city and in surrounding locations.

In 2008 Inge Sielmann, the widow of Heinz Sielmann, donated a special prize for filmmakers that is endowed with 5,000 Euros.

== Selected awardees ==
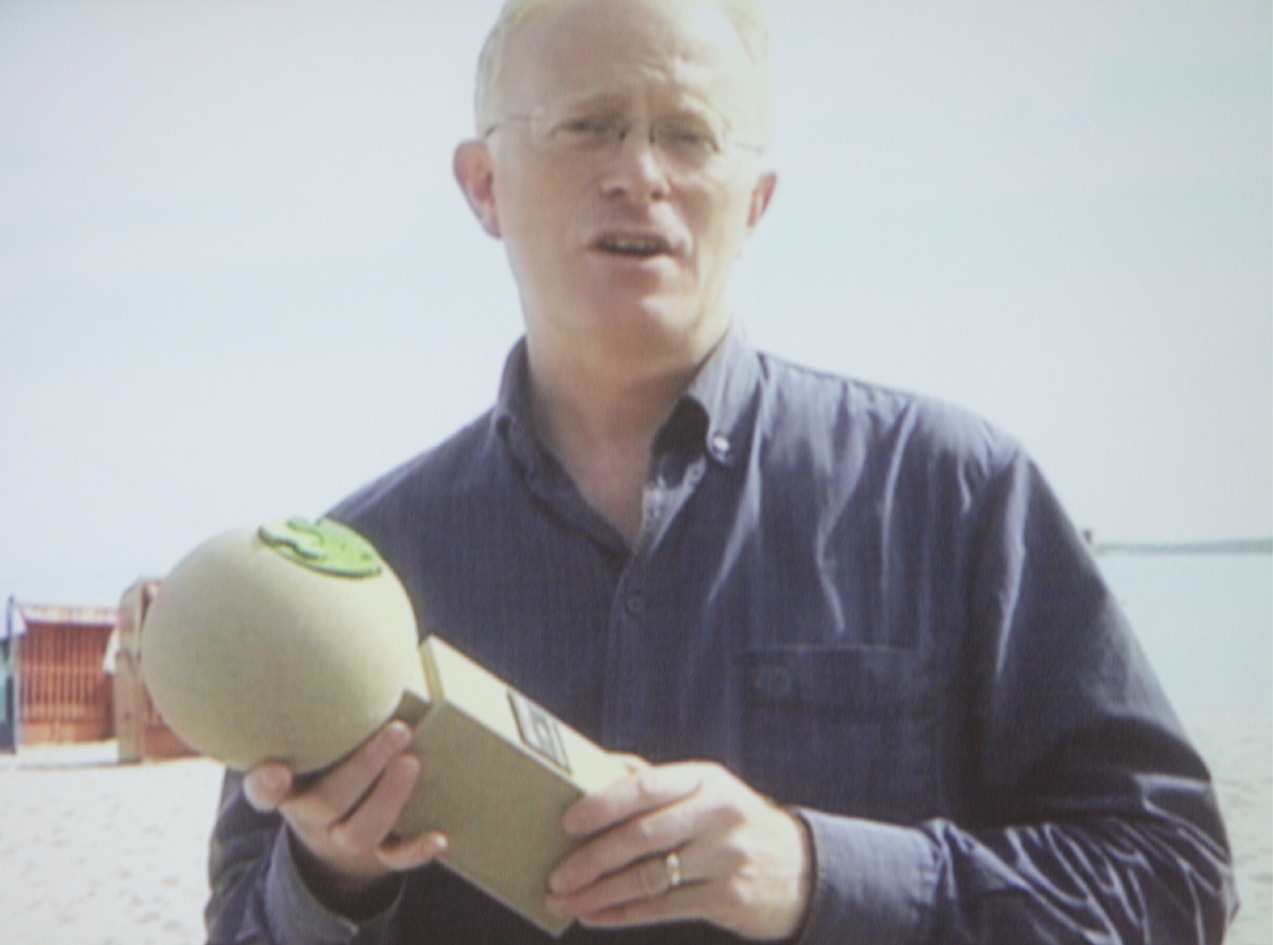
Mike Gunton (BBC), taking the award for Mike Salisburys Cork - Forest in a Bottle

=== 2014 ===
- Special Jury Award: More Than Honey of Markus Imhoof
- Audience Award Best Short Film for Kids: Die Sendung mit der Maus - The Source of the Runnel of Sabine Ennulath and Christoph Biemann
- Wild Laugh: Bottle of Kirsten Lepore

=== 2013 ===
- Heinz Sielmann Award for his lifetime achievement: David Attenborough

=== 2012 ===
- sh:z Audience Award: Europe's Last Wild Horses of Christian Baumeister

=== 2009 ===
- Prize for the Best Ecological Film: Cork – Forest in a Bottle of Mike Salisbury
