= Life in the Undergrowth =

- Region 2 DVD cover
- Genre: Nature documentary
- Directed by: Peter Bassett; Mike Salisbury; Bridget Appleby; Stephen Dunleavy
- Presented by: David Attenborough
- Composers: David Poore; Ben Salisbury
- Country of origin: United Kingdom
- Original language: English
- No. of episodes: 5

Production
- Executive producer: Mike Gunton
- Producer: Mike Salisbury
- Running time: 50 minutes
- Production company: BBC Natural History Unit

Original release
- Network: BBC One
- Release: 23 November – 21 December 2005

Related
- The Life of Mammals; Life in Cold Blood

Life in the Undergrowth is a BBC nature documentary series written and presented by David Attenborough, first transmitted in the UK from 23 November 2005.

A study of the evolution and habits of invertebrates, it was the fifth of Attenborough's specialised surveys following his major trilogy that began with Life on Earth. Each of the five 50-minute episodes looks at a group (or aspect) of the creatures using innovative photographic techniques.

The series was produced by the BBC Natural History Unit in conjunction with Animal Planet and The Open University. The executive producer was Mike Gunton, the series producer Mike Salisbury, and the music was composed by Ben Salisbury and David Poore. The Chief Scientific Consultant was Dr. George McGavin.

== Background ==
Invertebrates had been largely ignored by filmmakers in the past, due to the difficulties in filming them, but advances in lens and camera technology gave the makers an opportunity to film the creatures at their level. The series features a balance of everyday European invertebrates such as the wolf spider and housefly and more exotic varieties such as the redback spider of Australia and venomous centipedes of the Amazon. This was the first time that such animals had been photographed at such a high level of detail for television (some sequences were filmed in high definition format), and provided not only casual viewers but also scientists with a new understanding of certain species' behaviour.

Production of the series took around two years, during which time filming took place around the world, from the Amazonian rainforest to Costa Rica, Australia, Malaysia, Hungary, Switzerland and many more locations, including the United Kingdom.

To follow and understand the various species looked at throughout the series, the production team consulted with some of the foremost experts on invertebrate life. In certain instances, their help proved invaluable, particularly when coming across particularly dangerous species or societies. In other instances, the specialists helped to provide some of their most recent discoveries, enabling the makers to showcase in rich detail the complex processes through which invertebrates may interact with their environment, as well as the regular processes of all animals in the wild, such as their mating rituals and hunt for food. Many of the creatures' interactions were not only filmed for the first time, but were also recorded with such extraordinary magnification that scientists who studied them were able to answer specific questions that observance with the naked eye had hitherto rendered impossible.

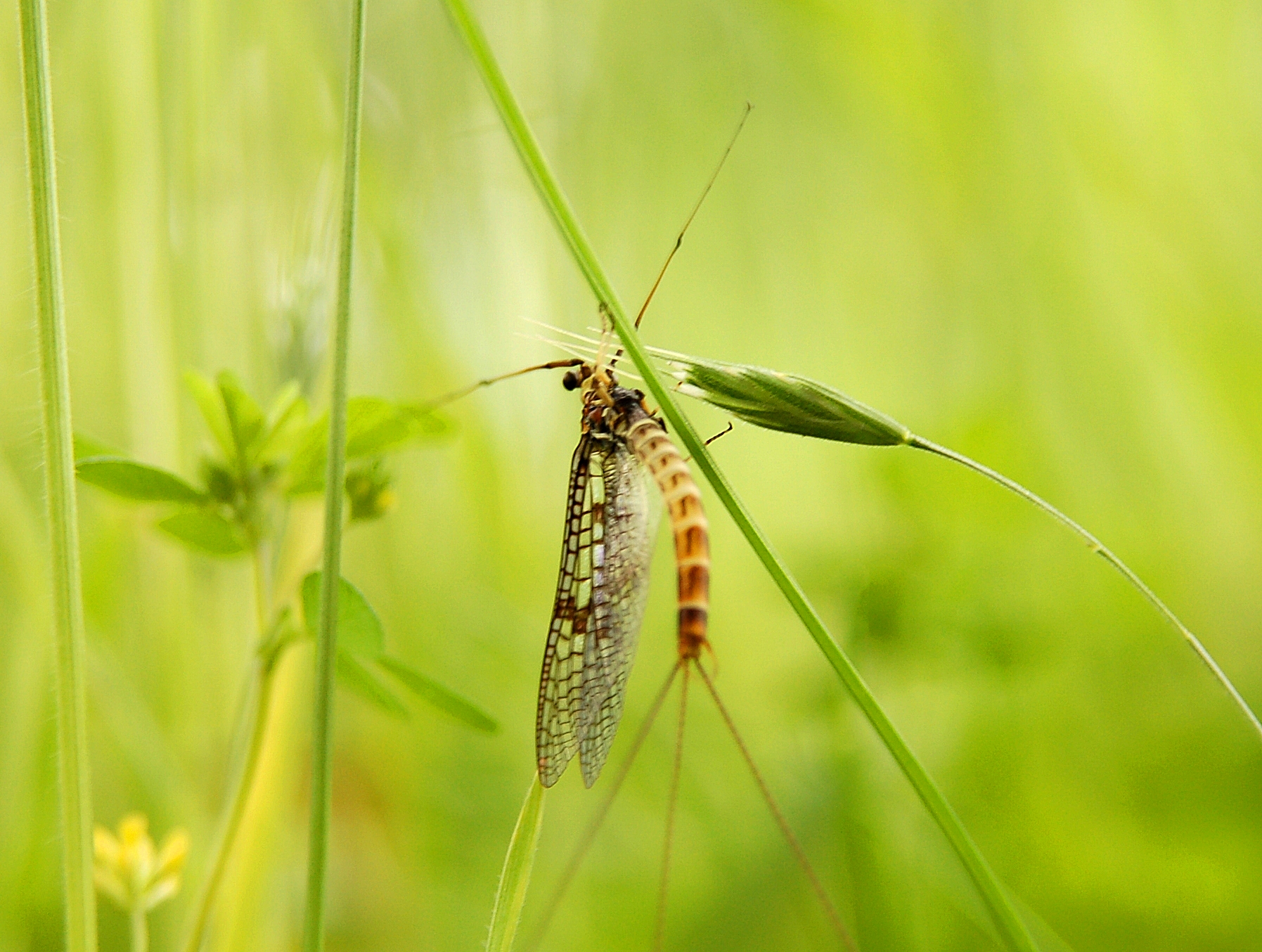
Filming of mayflies was made possible by their appearance on the last day.

As always, time and money constraints played a huge part. The filming schedules had to be arranged to fit in with expected dates of major events that were planned to be included, such as the emergence of the North American cicadas or the mass emergence of mayfly in Hungary. As is usual in the preparation of a nature documentary, not everything went to plan, due to the unpredictable nature of the subject matter.

Planning was necessary to film the emergence of 17-year cicadas like these.

Although filming took place over several years, time constraints still meant that some scenes almost weren't filmed, and a few never materialised at all. For instance, the simultaneous mass emergence of the mayfly in Hungary did not occur until the deadline day for its filming, as David Attenborough had to be in Switzerland the very next day to film the mating of wood ants. Using expert advice, the team had come to film at the time of the annual emergence, but the problem of the unusually wet spring had delayed the event. Luckily, on the very last day conditions were perfect, and the mayfly emerged – apparently in one of the more impressive manifestations of recent times. Because of these kinds of occurrences being largely dependent on environmental factors such as temperature or moisture, it was nearly impossible to tell exactly when they would happen. Instead the producers had to rely on expert estimates, but even these could be completely unpredictable. So although the mayfly appearance was captured, others were missed, such as the advent of a type of moth in Arizona (despite the camera crew camping out in the area twice, two weeks at a time).

Sometimes subjects were so small that it would have been impossible to film them in the wild. Instead, the construction of a complete habitat in a studio allowed easy pursuit of their actions, allowing the camera to capture them throughout their day. This technique was used on the wolf spider, for example, which provided some 200 hours of film – notably including its courting ritual. Despite the arm span of the grown spider being no more than 1 cm, even the newborn arachnids are shown in tight close-up as they climb on to their mother's back.

Filming also involved entering rough environments. To film the giant centipede, a team had to endure a dark cave whose floor was covered with guano, beetles and cockroaches.

== Episodes ==
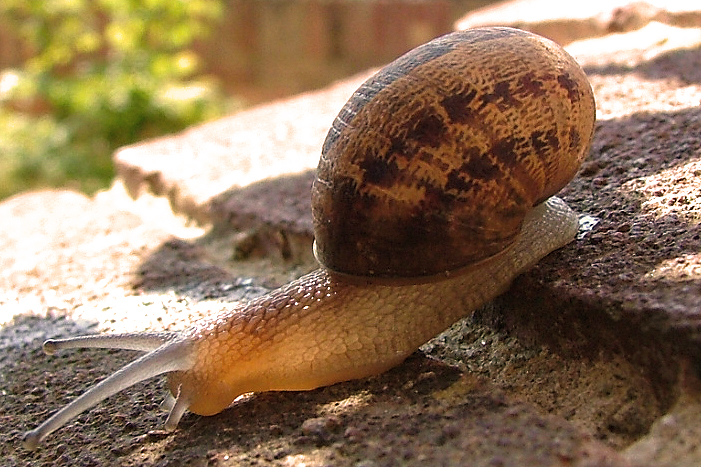
The first episode begins with a close-up of a snail.

"An eye from another world; a smell-detector, investigating the path ahead. We don't often see a snail that way, and that's because we've only recently had the tiny lenses and electronic cameras that we need to explore this miniature world. But when we meet its inhabitants face to face, we suddenly realise that their behaviour can be just as meaningful to us as the behaviour of many animals more our own size."

— David Attenborough's opening narration

No.	Title	Original release date
1	"Invasion of the Land"	23 November 2005
Original footage includes predation by a velvet worm. The first episode tells how invertebrates became the first creatures of any kind to colonise dry land. Their forerunners were shelled and segmented sea creatures that existed 400 million years ago. Some of them ventured out of the water to lay their eggs in safety, and Attenborough compares those first steps with today's mass spawning of horseshoe crabs off the Atlantic coast of North America. Some animals abandoned the oceans altogether when the land became green with algae, mosses and liverworts. The earliest ground-dwellers were millipedes, which were quickly followed by other species. Springtails are shown to be smaller than the head of a pin and, for their size, can jump immense heights. The velvet worm hunts nocturnally and has scarcely changed over millennia, while the giant centipede (possibly a kind of Scolopendromorpha) can kill instantly and is shown hunting bats in Venezuela. Mating habits are explored, including the unusual ritual of leopard slugs and the meticulous nest maintenance of the harvestman. The arrival of earthworms was of great importance since they changed the nature of the soil, leading to a proliferation of plant life. Despite their aquatic ancestry, many invertebrates, particularly those with no exoskeleton, need a moist environment to keep themselves from drying out. Finally, a creature that has adapted to a desert habitat, the scorpion, is shown as it pursues its dangerous courting dance, followed by the birth of up to fifty individuals.
2	"Taking to the Air"	30 November 2005
A hoverfly in flight The next programme deals with flying insects. It begins in Central Europe, where the Körös River plays host to millions of giant mayflies as they rise from their larval skins to mate. – the climax of their lives. Mayflies and dragonflies were among the first to take to the air about 320 million years ago, and fossils reveal that some were similar in size to a seagull. Damselflies are also looked at in detail. One species, the rare cascade damselfly, inhabits waterfalls, while another, the helicopter damselfly, lives away from water (unlike all the others in its group) and is also the biggest. Several types of butterfly are shown, but all have common habits, and Attenborough describes their physiology. Together with moths, they possess the largest wings, and this surface area gives ample opportunity to display for partners or warn off predators. In cold weather, bumblebees must warm themselves to prepare for flight: they 'disable' their wings, enabling them to exercise their muscles without taking off. The vestigial rear wings of flies and crane flies are used for navigation, and arguably the most accomplished insect aviator is the hoverfly, which makes continuous adjustments while in the air to remain stationary. Beetles that are capable of flight have to keep their wings below covers, and a specimen of the largest, the titan beetle, is shown. Attenborough attempts to entice a male cicada, only to have it land on his ear (causing laughter from the camera team).
3	"The Silk Spinners"	7 December 2005
A wolf spider with young attached to her abdomen The third instalment examines the spiders and others that produce silk. Attenborough visits New Zealand's Waitomo Caves, which are inhabited by fungus gnats whose illuminated larvae sit atop glistening, beaded filaments to lure their prey. The ability to spin silk developed early in the invertebrates' history, being first used as an adhesive. The female lacewing still applies it in this way, to suspend its eggs from plant stems. Spiders first employed it as a sensitive trip line to detect movement, and Attenborough illustrates this by encouraging a trapdoor spider. The speed with which it appears causes the presenter to jump in surprise. The webs spun by orb-weavers are complex and can comprise up to 60 metres of silk and 3,000 separate attachments. A time-lapse sequence reveals their intricate construction. The largest are made by Nephila and can be several metres across. The venomous redback spins three-dimensionally, and fixes vertical lines that suspend its unlucky meals in mid-air. Meanwhile, a bolas spider swings a length of silk with a sticky blob on the end, with which to snare passing moths. Argiope exemplifies the dangers of mating that are faced by some male spiders: unless they are careful, they can be consumed by the females. The courtship of the wolf spider, though less risky, is one of the more elaborate. Its nesting habits are discussed, along with the eventual birth of its young, which cling to their mother's back.
4	"Intimate Relations"	14 December 2005
A white crab spider has captured a fly visiting a flower, showing a mix of mutualism and predation. The penultimate episode focuses on the relationships between invertebrates and plants or other animals. It begins with ants and aphids: the former 'herd' the latter and protect them in return for secreted honeydew. The activities of gall-inducing insects are described, using the example of the oak tree. Many plants recruit insects to aid pollination, offering nectar for doing so, and some predators have adopted camouflage to take advantage of this, such as the crab spider. Stick insects rely on ants to hide their eggs underground for them in safety. In the Californian desert, the blister beetle's larvae congregate on a stem and, by releasing a pheromone, attract a male digger bee on the lookout for a female. They climb aboard their visitor and eventually transfer to its mate, which will in turn unwittingly deposit them in its nest – providing sustenance. An orchard spider is shown enduring a parasitic wasp grub, which injects its host with a hormone that deranges it and halts the spinning of webs. The grub then sucks the liquid from the spider's body and uses the remaining silk to form its cocoon. Fairy wasps are so small that they can lay their eggs inside those of water beetles – and can even mate while inside them. The tiger beetle larva ambushes ants by plugging its burrow with its head and pouncing. However, this doesn't work with Methocha, an ant-like wasp, which avoids the jaws of the beetle larva, paralyses it with a sting, and lays its eggs on the host. After dragging the paralysed larva deeper into the burrow, the entrance is carefully plugged and concealed. Ants defend their colonies fiercely; however Alcon blue butterflies manage to get their young inside the ants' nests by giving their young a scent exactly like that of the ant larvae; as a result the caterpillars are treated as if they were in fact ant larvae. However, this strategy is not flawless. Ichneumon wasps break into the ant colonies and release chemicals that make the ant guardians attack each other; the wasp then injects two of her eggs into the butterfly caterpillars. However, the ants seem to save at least one caterpillar as one of the pupae is later shown hatching into an adult Alcon blue butterfly.
5	"Supersocieties"	21 December 2005
Harvester ants plug up the exits of nearby ants with small stones. The final programme looks at the superorganisms formed by bees, ants and termites. Attenborough reveals that their colonies, whose individuals were once considered purely servile, are "full of conflict, power struggles and mutinies." They evolved when such creatures moved away from a solitary existence and started building nests side-by-side, which led to a collective approach to caring for their young. There are about 20,000 species of bee, and a queen bumblebee is shown starting a new nest. As it grows, the inhabitants all help to maintain it and bring nectar and pollen. However, anarchy erupts when the queen starts to destroy eggs laid by her workers: she is stung to death and the colony ends. Ants live in bigger societies, which can make them vulnerable, but Attenborough goads a nest of wood ants into demonstrating their defence: formic acid. In Australia, a nest in a mangrove swamp has to be continuously rearranged to escape the tides. Meanwhile, desert-dwelling harvester ants block up nearby nests in an effort to maximise their food pickings. A bivouac of army ants is explored: they prove to be one of those most regimented organisms, where the action of each individual is for the good of the million-strong colony. Attenborough investigates magnetic termites, whose slab-like mounds are all aligned to account for the movement of the Sun. Finally, a full-scale battle between termites and matabele ants is depicted in close-up.

"If we and the rest of the backboned animals were to disappear overnight, the rest of the world would get on pretty well. But if [the invertebrates] were to disappear, the land's ecosystems would collapse. The soil would lose its fertility. Many of the plants would no longer be pollinated. Lots of animals, amphibians, reptiles, birds, mammals would have nothing to eat. And our fields and pastures would be covered with dung and carrion. These small creatures are within a few inches of our feet, wherever we go on land – but often, they're disregarded. We would do very well to remember them."

— David Attenborough, in closing

== DVD and book ==
The series is available in the UK for Regions 2 and 4 as a 2-disc DVD (BBCDVD1737, released 5 December 2005) and as part of The Life Collection. Its special features comprise an interview with the series producer, Mike Salisbury, and the original score.

The accompanying 320-page book, Life in the Undergrowth by David Attenborough (ISBN 0-563-52208-9), was published by BBC Books on 10 October 2005.

== Viewer's guide ==
In 2008, the BBC made available online a viewer's guide to Life in the Undergrowth, specially designed to help the viewer locate an exciting clip of a particular scientific or geographical lesson.

Topic	Subtopic	Species	Episode	Description
Adaptation	Feeding Strategies	Moth, hummingbird hawk moth	2 - Taking to the Air	How different moths feed on tree sap and nectar, including the hummingbird hawk moth.
Behaviour	Camouflage	Stick insect	4 - Intimate Relations	Features a stick insect that, through camouflage, looks like a dried leaf.
Behaviour	Social Groups	Bee, wasp	5 - Super Societies	Colonial breeding and organisation of super societies in bees and wasps.
Communication	Pheromones	Alcon butterfly	4 - Intimate Relations	Alcon butterfly caterpillars using pheromones to disguise themselves as ant larvae to hide in ant nests.
Competition	Animals	Harvester ant, Long legged ant	5 - Super Societies	Competition for seeds between harvester ants and long legged ants.
Cooperation	Cooperation	Army ant	5 - Super Societies	Features a million or more army ants cooperating in hunting and nesting.
Decomposers	Decomposers	Earthworm, giant Gippsland earthworm	1 - Invasion of the Land	Features the earthworm and its importance for the soil, and six feet long giant gippsland earthworm.
Evolution	Invertebrates		1 - Invasion of the Land	Evolution of land invertebrates, how they have adapted to survive out of water, and their relationship with green plants.
Habitats	Deserts	Scorpion	1 - Invasion of the Land	Features a typical desert landscape and explains how scorpions are able to survive in this dry, hostile environment.
Habitats	Ponds	Diving beetle, fairy wasp, water flea	4 - Intimate Relations	Features a variety of pond creatures including diving beetles, fairy wasps and water fleas.
Habitats	Gardens	Aphid, ant, ladybird	4 - Intimate Relations	Features the friend and foe relationships between gardeners, aphids, ants and ladybirds.
Locomotion	Flight	Dragonfly	2 - Taking to the Air	Explains the mechanics of how dragonflies fly, showing their amazing speed and manoeuvrability.
Locomotion	Flight	Bumblebee, fly	2 - Taking to the Air	Wing design and flight mechanics of bumblebees and flies. Immaculate aerial control makes a male more attractive to females in hover flies.
Parasites	Parasites	Wasp, cabbage white butterfly	2 - Taking to the Air	Wasp parasitising cabbage white butterfly caterpillars.
Parasites	Parasites	Blister beetle, digger bee	4 - Intimate Relations	Deception by blister beetle larvae in order to parasitise digger bee nests.
Parasites	Parasites	Bot fly	4 - Intimate Relations	Bot fly life cycle which includes parasitising house flies and cows.
Predation	Invertebrates	Velvet worm, giant centipede	1 - Invasion of the Land	Features some of the most vicious invertebrate hunters: the velvet worm catching its prey by shooting strings of glue and the giant centipede hunting bats in caves.
Predation	Invertebrates	Glowworm, mayfly	3 - The Silk Spinners	Dramatic spectacle of glowworms catching mayflies in a New Zealand cave.
Predation	Invertebrates	Bolas spider	3 - The Silk Spinners	Bolas spider using droplet pheromone as bait to lure moths.
Predation	Invertebrates	White crab spider, assassin bug	4 - Intimate Relations	Features white crab spiders and assassin bugs using pheromones to lure their prey into their claws.
Reproduction	Courtship	Spring tail	1 - Invasion of the Land	The headbutting courtship dance of tiny spring tails.
Reproduction	Courtship	Mojave sand scorpion	1 - Invasion of the Land	The Mojave sand scorpion's dangerous courtship ritual.
Reproduction	Hermaphrodites	Leopard slug	1 - Invasion of the Land	Features the unusual mating behaviour of leopard slugs which have both male and female organs.
Reproduction	Parental Care	Paper wasp	5 - Super Societies	Shows how paper wasps build colonial nests and share parental duties which enables them to raise more young.
Reproduction	Invertebrates	Wolf spider	3 - The Silk Spinners	Courtship, mating, egg laying and parental care in wolf spiders.
Reproduction	Invertebrates	Cabbage white butterfly	2 - Taking to the Air	Life cycle of the cabbage white butterfly.
Reproduction	Invertebrates	Paper wasp, bumblebee	5 - Super Societies	Colonial breeding strategies of paper wasps and bumblebees.
Shelters	Shelters	Termite	5 - Super Societies	Features termites constructing a gigantic mound which is equipped with protective features.
Symbiosis	Plants and insects	Duroia tree	4 - Intimate Relations	How ants depend on the Duroia tree for a nesting site, and in return protect the tree from plant predators and competing plants.
Symbiosis	Plants and insects	Ant, aphid	4 - Intimate Relations	How ants protect aphids from predation by ladybirds, and in return get a meal of sugary nectar.
Children's favourites	Mini beasts		1 - Invasion of the Land	Features a montage of mini beasts at very close quarters.
Children's favourites	Mini beasts	Snail	1 - Invasion of the Land	Features a snail thriving in dark, damp conditions.
Children's favourites	Mini beasts	Spider	3 - The Silk Spinners	Features a spider skilfully constructing its web.
Learning to learn	Teamwork	Bee	5 - Super Societies	Features bees working together to help make their colonies a success.
Learning to learn	Teamwork	Army ant	5 - Super Societies	Features a million or more army ants working together to establish a new nesting site.

== See also ==
- Microcosmos (nature documentary with similar subject matter)
