= Mike Salisbury =

English documentary filmmaker (1942–2026)

- Born: John Michael Salisbury; 29 March 1942; Derry, Northern Ireland
- Died: 13 May 2026 (aged 84)
- Occupation: Filmmaker

John Michael Salisbury, OBE (29 March 1942 – 13 May 2026) was an English documentary filmmaker specialising in natural history programmes for television.

== Life and career ==
John Michael Salisbury was born in Derry, Northern Ireland, on 29 March 1942, and raised in Harpenden, Hertfordshire.

In a career spanning four decades, he spent over 30 years working for the BBC Natural History Unit where he produced a string of award-winning series, many in collaboration with David Attenborough.

He retired from the Unit in 2006 but continued to work as a freelance producer.

In 2007, he was made an OBE in the New Year Honours List for his services to broadcasting.

Salisbury died on 13 May 2026, aged 84.

== Film and television credits ==
- Natural World strand:

Episode "Cork: Forest in a Bottle" (2008) – producer
Episode "Transylvania, Living with Predators" (2001) – producer
Episode "Wolves and Buffalo: An Ancient Alliance" (1997) – producer
Episode "Snowdonia: Realm of the Ravens" (1994) – producer
Series editor (1989–1993)
Miniseries New Guinea: An Island Apart (1992) – executive producer
Episode "Haida Gwaii: Islands of the People" (1990) – producer
Miniseries Kingdom of the Ice Bear (1985) – writer & producer
Episode "Through Animal Eyes" (1985) – writer & producer

- "Gorillas Revisited" (2006) – on-screen participant
- Life in the Undergrowth (2005) – series producer
- The Way We Went Wild (2004) – on-screen participant
- The Life of Mammals (2002) – series producer
- They Said It Couldn't Be Done (1999) – on-screen participant
- The Life of Birds (1998) – executive producer
- BBC Wildlife Specials strand:

Episode "Wolf" (1997) – producer

- The Private Life of Plants (1995) – executive producer
- Lost Worlds, Vanished Lives (1989) – executive producer
- Wildlife on One strand:

Episode "Unearthing the Mole" (1989) – producer
Episode "Shipwreck" (1980) – producer

- The Discovery of Animal Behaviour (1982) – producer
- Animal Olympians (1980) – assistant producer
- Life on Earth (1979) – assistant producer
- Animal Magic (1975) – director
- The World About Us (1974) – assistant producer

== See also ==
- Nature documentary
- BBC Natural History Unit
- NHU Filmography
- David Attenborough
- Green Screen film festival International Wildlife Filmfestival Eckernfoerde
