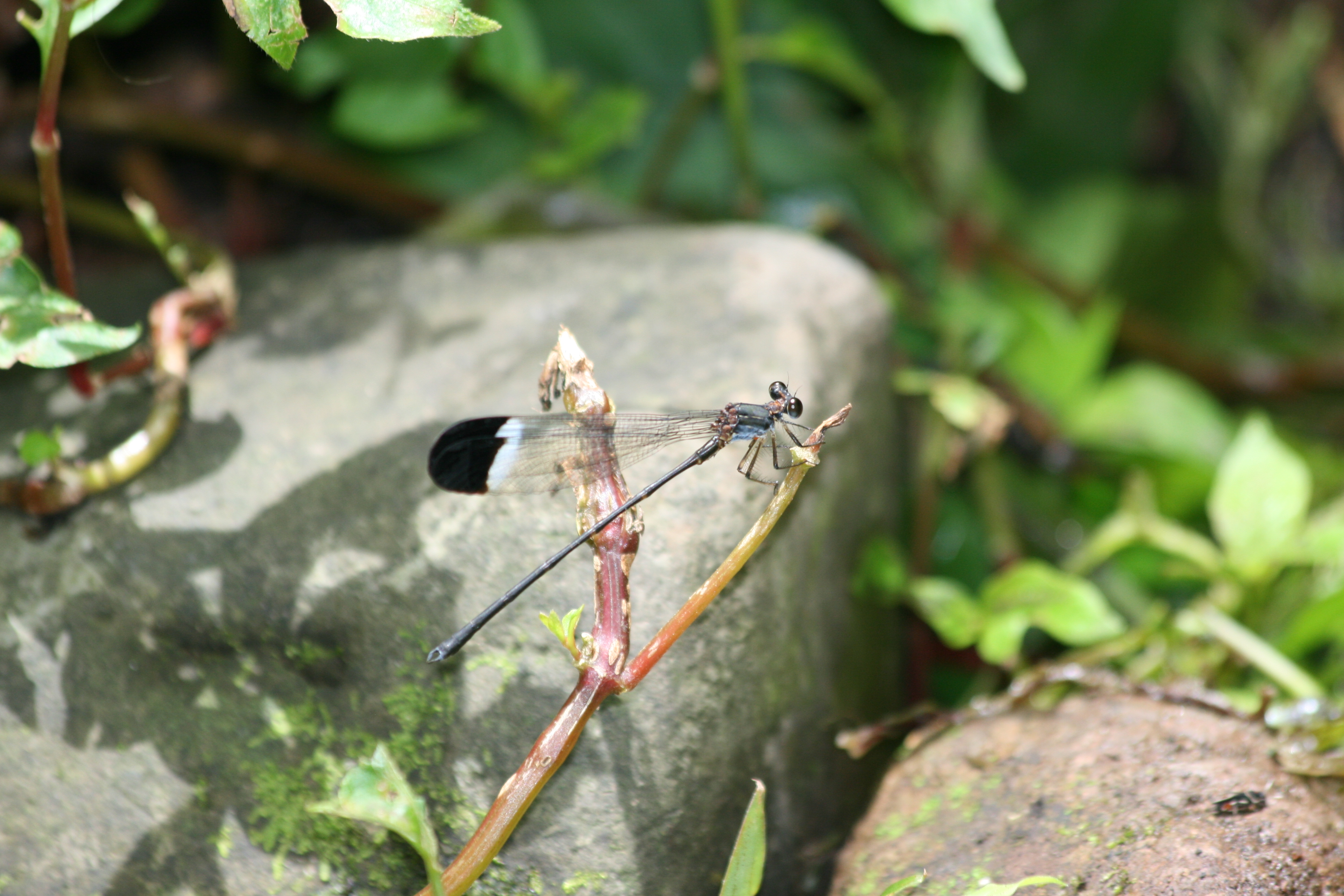
- Paraphlebia zoe in Veracruz

Scientific classification
- Kingdom: Animalia
- Phylum: Arthropoda
- Clade: Pancrustacea
- Class: Insecta
- Order: Odonata
- Suborder: Zygoptera
- Superfamily: Amphipterygoidea
- Family: Thaumatoneuridae
- Genus: Paraphlebia; Selys, 1861

= Paraphlebia =

Genus of damselflies

Paraphlebia is a genus of flatwings in the damselfly family Thaumatoneuridae. It was formerly in the subfamily Argiolestinae of the family Megapodagrionidae, but was moved to the family Thaumatoneuridae as a result of molecular phylogenetic studies by Dijkstra et al. in 2013.

== Species ==
These fifteen species belong to the genus Paraphlebia:

- Paraphlebia akan
- Paraphlebia chaak
- Paraphlebia chiarae
- Paraphlebia duodecima Calvert, 1901
- Paraphlebia esperanza
- Paraphlebia flinti
- Paraphlebia hunnal
- Paraphlebia hyalina Brauer, 1871
- Paraphlebia itzamna
- Paraphlebia ixchel
- Paraphlebia kauil
- Paraphlebia kinich
- Paraphlebia kukulkan
- Paraphlebia quinta Calvert, 1901
- Paraphlebia zoe Selys in Hagen, 1861 - Zoe Waterfall Damsel
