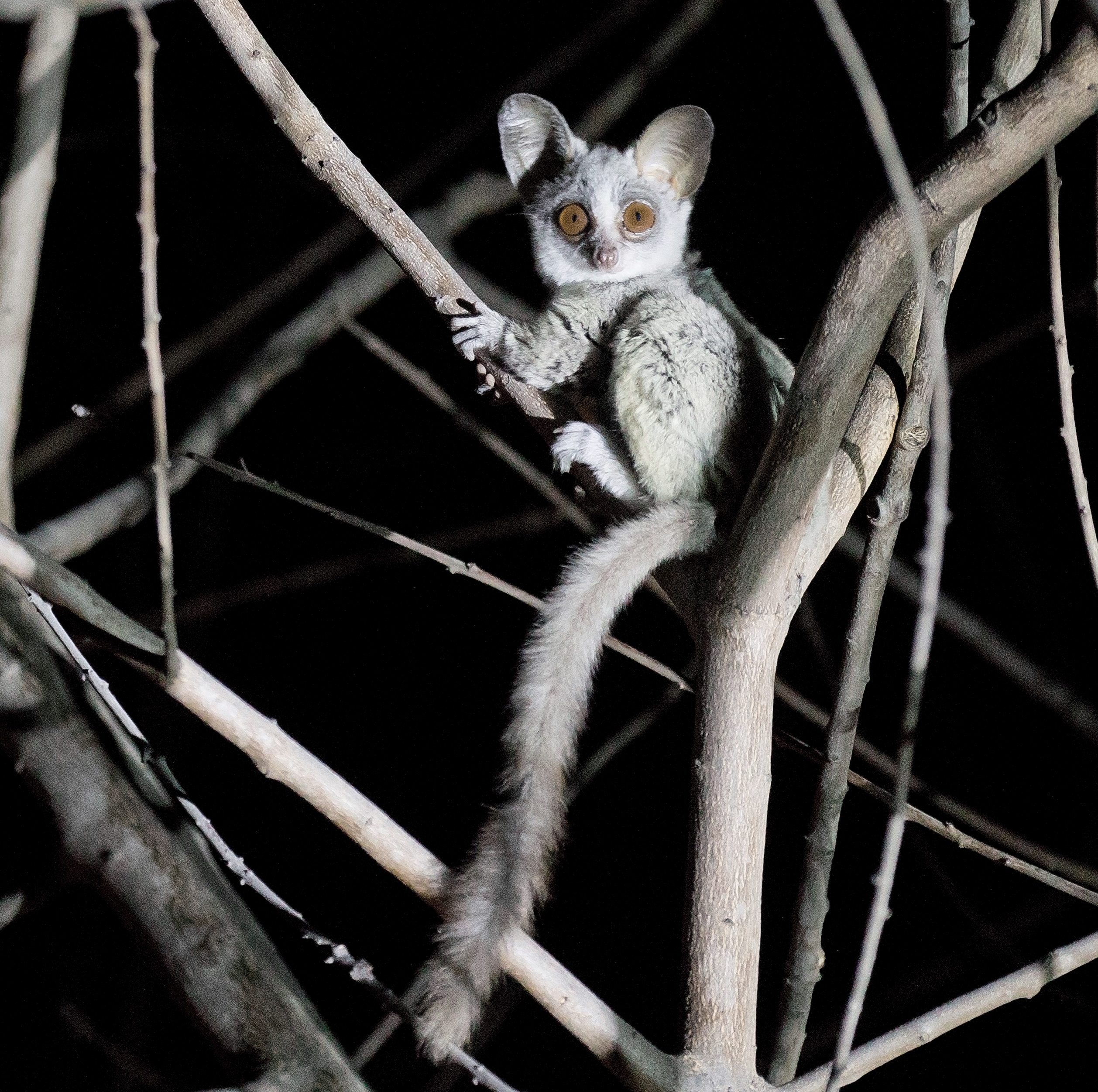
- At Thamalakane River, Botswana

Conservation status
- Least Concern (IUCN 3.1)

Scientific classification
- Kingdom: Animalia
- Phylum: Chordata
- Class: Mammalia
- Infraclass: Placentalia
- Order: Primates
- Suborder: Strepsirrhini
- Family: Galagidae
- Genus: Galago
- Species: G. moholi

Binomial name
- Galago moholi A. Smith, 1836
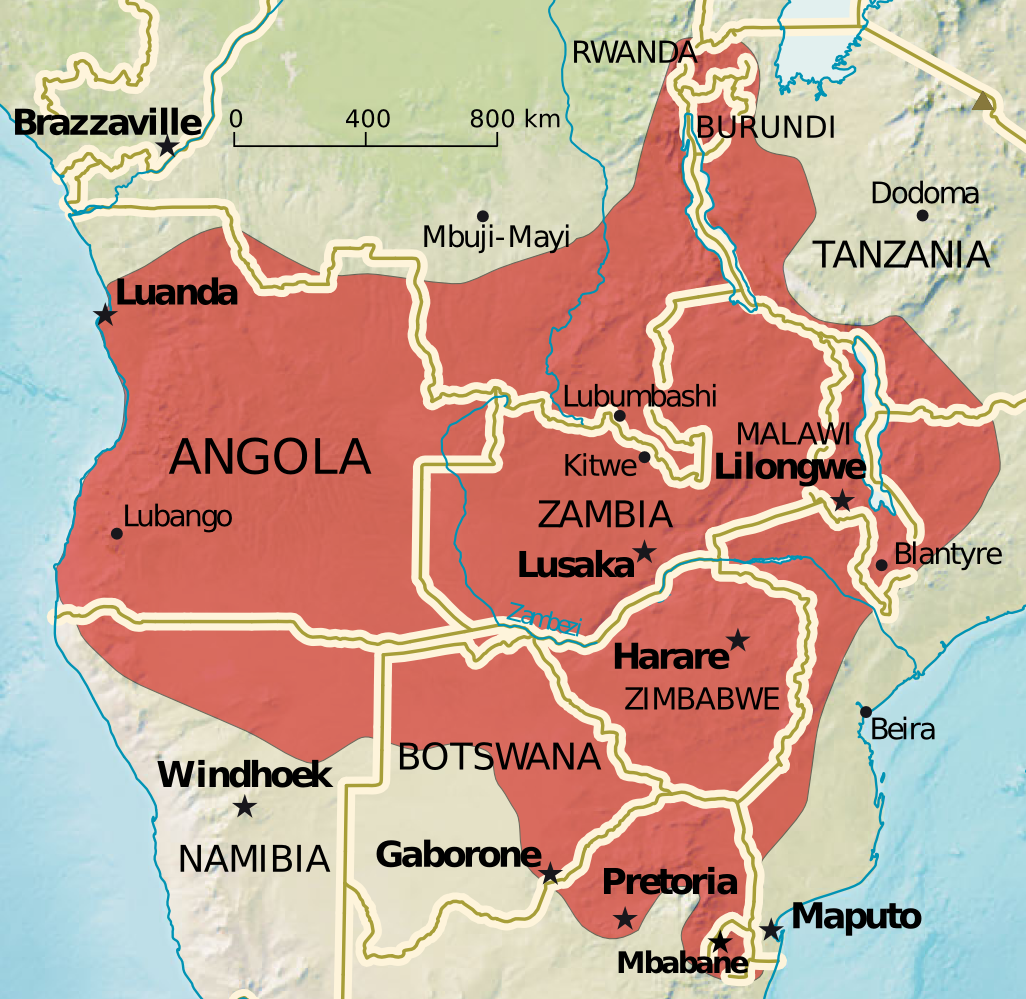
- native range

= Mohol bushbaby =

Species of primate

The Mohol bushbaby (Galago moholi) is a species of primate in the family Galagidae which is native to mesic woodlands of southern Africa. It is physically very similar to the Senegal bushbaby, and was formerly considered to be its southern variety. The two species differ markedly in their biology however, and no hybrids have been recorded in captivity.

== Description ==
The Mohol bushbaby is a medium size species with a head-and-body length of 15 cm (6 in) and a tail of 23 cm (9 in). The head is broad, with a short muzzle, orange eyes and diamond-shaped black eye-rings. The nose-stripe is whitish and the ears are large and grey. The dorsal surface of the body has a greyish-brown pelage, and the underparts are white, sometimes with a yellowish tinge. The flanks, inside of the limbs, hands and feet are yellowish. The fingers and toes have spatulate tips. The tail is darker than the rest of the fur but is not very bushy.

== Range ==
The species is found in Angola, Botswana, the Democratic Republic of the Congo, Malawi, Mozambique, Namibia, South Africa, Eswatini, Tanzania, Zambia and Zimbabwe. It is perhaps also present in Rwanda and Burundi.

== Habitat ==
The species is naturally found in savanna, miombo, and mopane woodland as well as riverine galley forests. In these biomes, Acacia and Mopane trees are used as resting and breeding spots as well as food and water sources for the Mohol bushbaby, which reside in the thorny branches in groups of two to seven.

Breeding populations of this species are present in the suburbs of Johannesburg and Pretoria in South Africa. Some of these were originally escaped or released pets, while others have migrated from warmer regions.

== Ecology ==
The Mohol bushbaby feeds predominantly on insects and gum. The gum is an exudate from Acacia trees that oozes out of punctures made by insects. The most favoured gum-trees are sweet thorn (Acacia karroo) and umbrella thorn (Acacia tortilis). In the winter, the bushbaby moves between gum trees across the ground, but in the wet summer season, it usually travels arboreally, and consumes a much higher percentage of invertebrates. Feeding takes place soon after sunset, and then again throughout the night sporadically.

The Mohol bushbaby gets most of its water hygroscopically from its solid diet, and can live independently from water sources.

== Subspecies ==
Several authors recognize two subspecies:

- G. m. moholi – Moholi lesser bushbaby
  - Range: eastern part of range, westwards to western Zambia, where it intergrades with bradfieldi
- G. m. bradfieldi Roberts, 1931 – Namibia bushbaby
  - Range: Waterberg in Namibia northwards to southern Angola, and eastwards to northern Botswana including Makgadikgadi Pan, and the Western Province of Zambia
