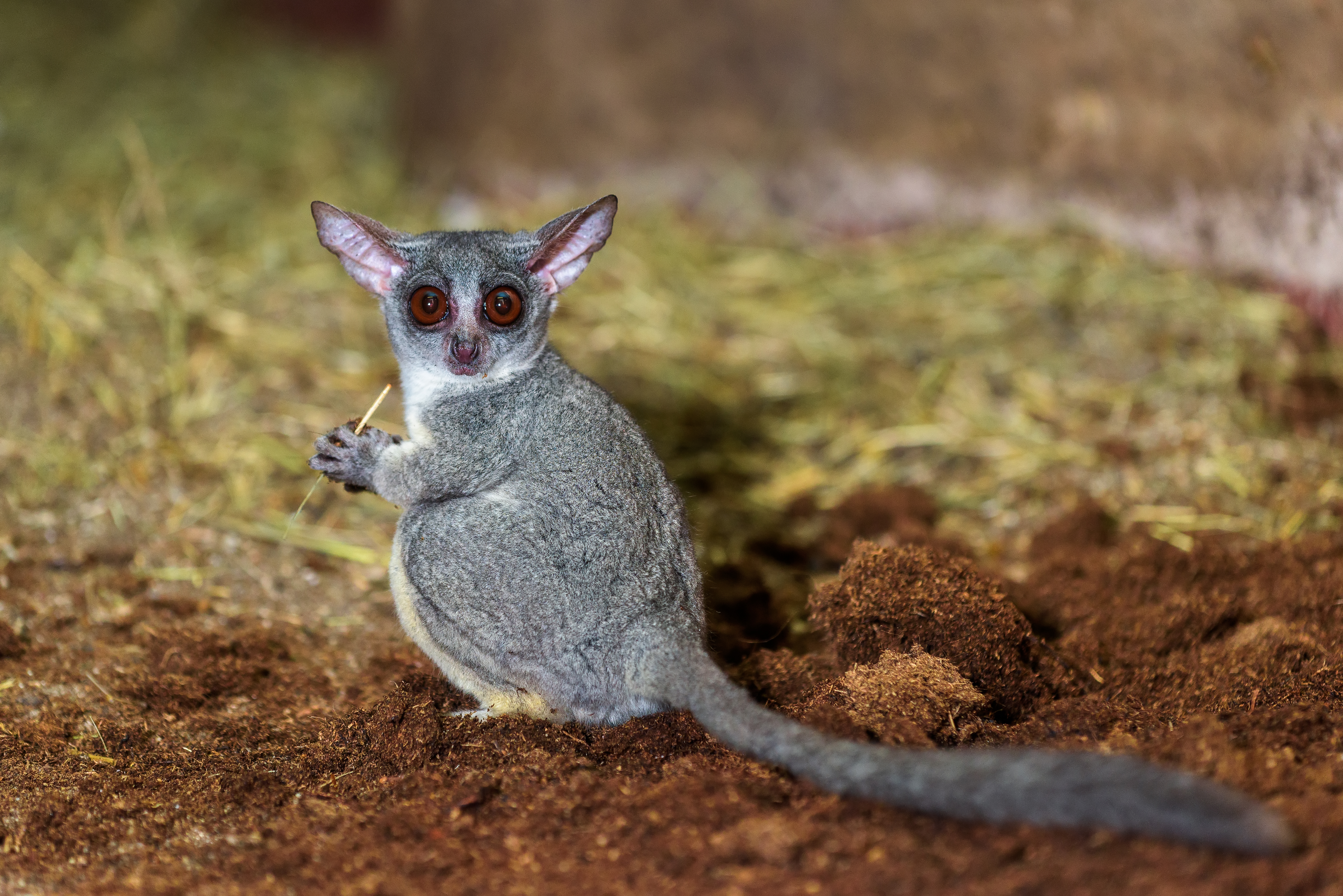
- Senegal bushbaby (G. senegalensis)

Scientific classification
- Kingdom: Animalia
- Phylum: Chordata
- Class: Mammalia
- Order: Primates
- Suborder: Strepsirrhini
- Family: Galagidae
- Genus: Galago; É. Geoffroy, 1796

Type species
- Galago senegalensis É. Geoffroy, 1796

Species
- Galago gallarum Galago matschiei Galago moholi Galago senegalensis

= Lesser bushbaby =

Galago

Genus of primates

Lesser bushbabies, or lesser galagos, are strepsirrhine primates of the genus Galago. They are classified, along with the other bushbaby and galago genera in the family Galagidae. They are probably the most numerous primate in Africa, and can be found in every large forest on the continent, inhabiting forested areas, savannas, riverine bush and open woodlands.

They mark their territory by urinating on their hands and leaving traces on the trees they climb across, and they follow these detectable paths through the trees night after night. Males will also urinate on females to mark them. They are related to lorises, and have similar behavior and anatomy. They are much faster, however, and typically hunt by speed rather than by stealth. Primitive bushbabies are thought to have been the ancestors of all lemurs.

== Appearance ==
Lesser bushbabies are small, woolly primates with long tails and oversized, naked ears. Different species are sometimes indistinguishable even when compared side by side. Additionally, there is often notable variation in coloration and body size even within species and populations. Their coat varies across body regions as well as between species, typically ranging from black, brown, and grey to white, with many showing a greenish, reddish, and orangeish tint to the sides and limbs. Some species have a nasal strip while others have distinct dark rings around the eyes.

Their neck is very flexible, so that the head can turn 180 degrees, which gives them a broad field of vision which is helpful in locating prey; they also have highly mobile ears that allow them to track insects as they hunt. Round flat pads on their fingertips, between their fingers, and on their palms at the base of their thumbs enable them to firmly grip the branches. They also have pointed, keeled nails that give them stability as they cling to smooth tree surfaces and reach for insects into crevices, using their rough narrow tongue.

== Distribution and habitat ==
Lesser bushbabies are distributed through most of Sub-Saharan Africa, ranging from Senegal east to Somalia and down to South Africa (excepting its southern extreme) and are present in almost every country in between. However, there are great differences in their extent and distribution by species. G. senegalensis is the most widespread species, extending from Senegal in the west across central Africa to eastern Africa. G. moholi has a broad distribution over much of southern Africa. G. gallarum has more restricted distributions in eastern Africa, and G. matschiei is restricted to Uganda.

Lesser bushbabies are found in a variety of habitats, such as woodland, bushland, savanna, montane forest, riverine habitats; favouring trees with little grass around them.

== Diet ==
Bushbabies generally consume three types of food in various proportions and combinations: animal prey, fruit, and gum. Although their diet consists mainly on small invertebrates (mostly insects), some species also eat frogs and possibly other small animals.

== Behaviour ==
Galagos are tree dwelling primates and are capable of leaping significant distances, up to and sometimes greater than 2.5 metres (8 ft 2 in), using flattened disks on their feet and hands as a way of grasping branches. However they do walk on the ground sometimes, either bipedally or on all fours.

Galagos are nocturnal animals, foraging at night and sleeping in trees during the day. Adults are mainly solitary and maintain social contact mainly through vocal communication. There are up to 18 distinct calls, used mainly for territorial advertisement and long-distance spacing. All these calls are part of three categories, defensive and aggressive, social contact, and annunciatory. They also have very highly developed hearing.

Bushbabies are solitary foragers, however they do meet up at night in groups. Some species, such as G. moholi, can be found sleeping in groups of 2 to 7 during the day. These groups are typically composed of a female and several of her young. At night the groups separate to forage independently. Males are mostly aggressive to each other; dominant males are the only ones that defend territories and are often the largest and most aggressive.

== Breeding ==
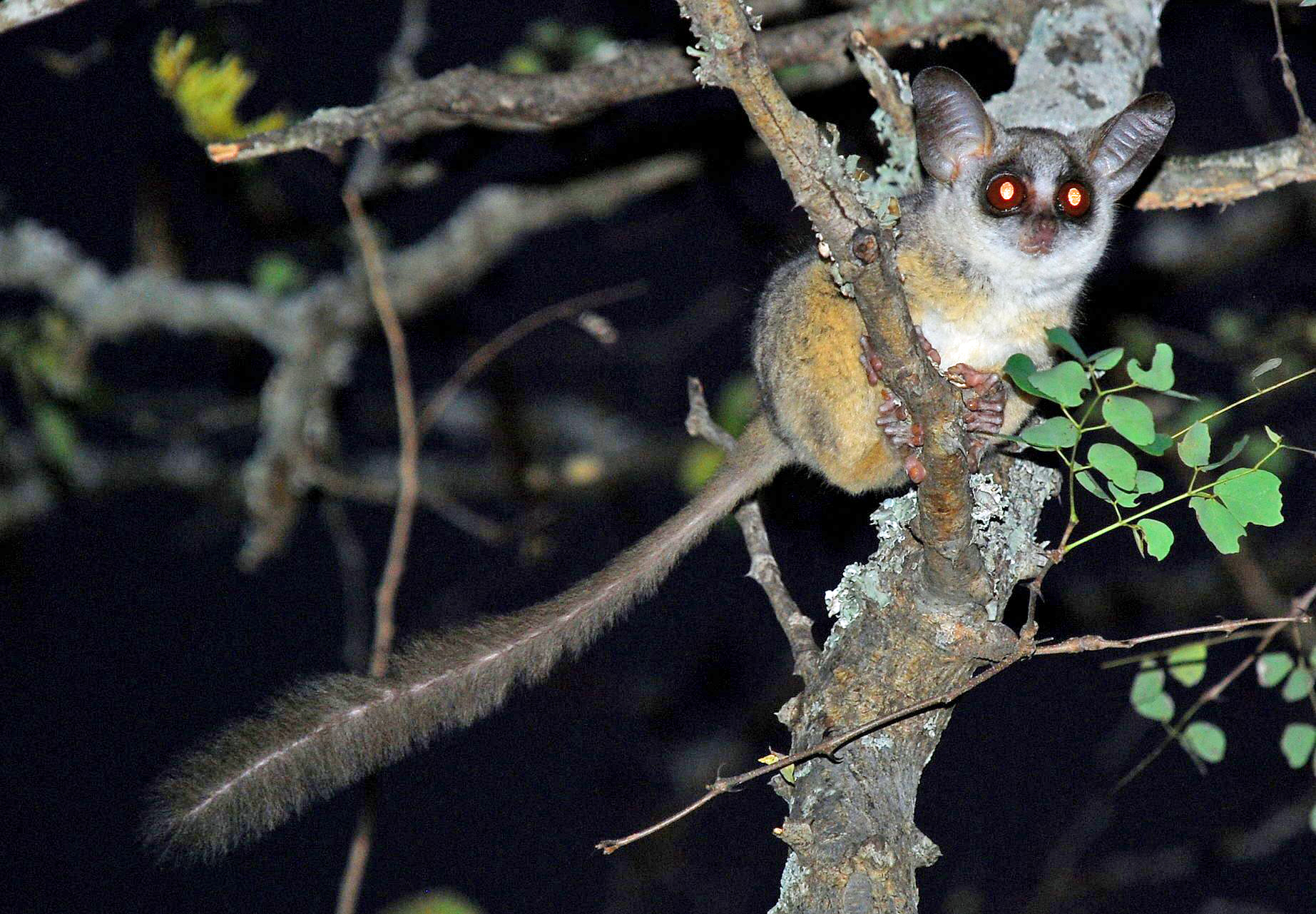
Mohol bushbaby (Galago moholi)

Lesser bushbabies usually give birth during the rainy season. The offspring are usually twins. After the birth there is usually a second period of heat. A female's gestation period is between 111–142 days and will usually consist of the female mating with up to 6 different males.

Lesser bushbaby mothers initially shelter their offspring in a nest or tree hollow, later on concealing the infants in foliage while they forage at night.

== Taxonomy ==
Genus Galago – É. Geoffroy, 1796 – three species
Common name	Scientific name and subspecies	Range	Size and ecology	IUCN status and estimated population
Dusky bushbaby	G. matschiei Liburnau, 1917	Central Africa	Size: 14–19 cm (6–7 in) long, plus 24–28 cm (9–11 in) tail Habitat: Forest Diet: Insects, fruit, flowers, and gum	LC Unknown
Mohol bushbaby	G. moholi Smith, 1836	Central and southern Africa	Size: 14–17 cm (6–7 in) long, plus 11–28 cm (4–11 in) tail Habitat: Savanna Diet: Arthropods, as well as tree gum and resin	LC Unknown
Senegal bushbaby	G. senegalensis É Geoffroy, 1796 Four subspecies: G. s. braccatus (Kenya lesser bushbaby); G. s. dunni (Ethiopia lesser bushbaby); G. s. senegalensis (Senegal lesser bushbaby); G. s. sotikae (Uganda lesser bushbaby)	Equatorial Africa (possible additional range in red)	Size: 13–21 cm (5–8 in) long, plus 19–30 cm (7–12 in) tail Habitat: Forest and savanna Diet: Insects, as well as small birds, eggs, fruits, seeds, flowers, and tree gum	LC Unknown
Somali bushbaby	G. gallarum Thomas, 1901	Eastern Africa	Size: 13–20 cm (5–8 in) long, plus 20–30 cm (8–12 in) tail Habitat: Savanna Diet: Gum and invertebrates	LC Unknown
