= Ben Salisbury =

British composer (born 1970)

Ben Salisbury (born 1970) is a British composer, particularly known for his work in film and television. He has also worked as a co-writer, arranger and musician with a number of bands. He studied music at Newcastle University and Bournemouth University.

== Career ==
Notable television credits include the BAFTA nominated David Attenborough series The Life of Mammals and Life in the Undergrowth, and the BAFTA-winning series Life in Cold Blood. He was nominated for an Emmy Award for his score for the Wildlife on One film Operation Dung Beetle.

Salisbury appears as co-writer, string arranger and musician on the Malachai album Return to the Ugly Side and The Beekeepers album Apiculture. He also co-wrote the album Drokk: Music Inspired by Mega City One with Portishead's Geoff Barrow, and writes and records as one half of the duo Dolman with Scott Hendy. Dolman released their eponymous debut album on Inflection Point Records in June 2014.

In 2012, Salisbury composed the score for the documentary feature film Beyoncé: Life Is But a Dream – a behind the scenes look at the singer's life and music.

Together with Geoff Barrow, he scored the feature film Ex Machina, Alex Garland's directorial debut, released in the UK in January 2015. Salisbury and Barrow won the 2016 Ivor Novello award for Best Original Score for Ex Machina. The two teamed up again to score Garland's Annihilation (2018) and TV series Devs.

== Credits ==
Year	Title	Director	Notes
2014	Ex Machina	Alex Garland	With Geoff Barrow, First collaboration. Album label at Back Lot Music
2016	Men Against Fire	Jakob Verbruggen	With Geoff Barrow.
2016	Free Fire	Ben Wheatley	With Geoff Barrow. Album Label at Lakeshore Records.
2018	Annihilation	Alex Garland	With Geoff Barrow, Second collaboration with director Alex Garland. Album label at Lakeshore Records.
2019	Hanna (TV series)	Created by David Farr	With Geoff Barrow and Simon Ashdown
2019	Luce	Julius Onah	With Geoff Barrow. Album Label at Lakeshore Records.
2020	Devs (miniseries)	Alex Garland	With Geoff Barrow
2022	Archive 81	Developed by Rebecca Sonnenshine	With Geoff Barrow
2022	Men	Alex Garland	With Geoff Barrow
2024	Constellation	Peter Harkness	With Suvi-Eeva Äikäs
2024	Civil War	Alex Garland	With Geoff Barrow
