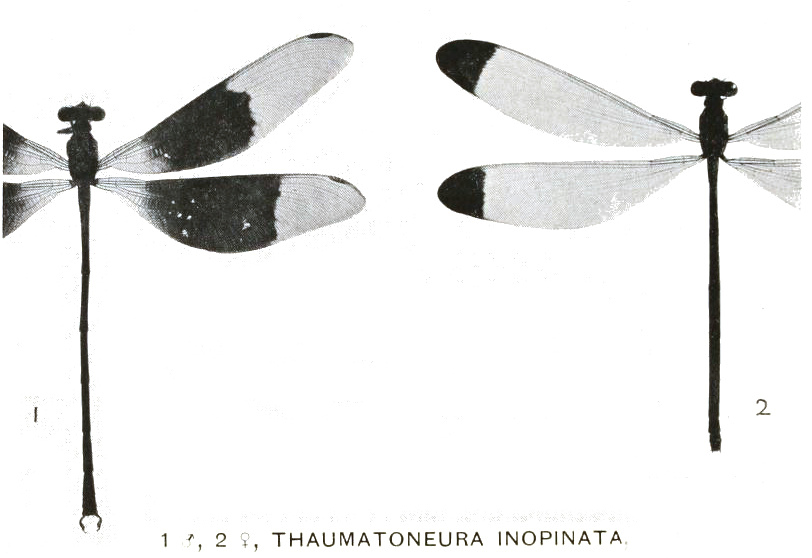

Conservation status
- Least Concern (IUCN 3.1)

Scientific classification
- Kingdom: Animalia
- Phylum: Arthropoda
- Clade: Pancrustacea
- Class: Insecta
- Order: Odonata
- Suborder: Zygoptera
- Superfamily: Amphipterygoidea
- Family: Thaumatoneuridae
- Genus: Thaumatoneura; McLachlan, 1897
- Species: T. inopinata

Binomial name
- Thaumatoneura inopinata McLachlan, 1897

= Thaumatoneura inopinata =

Species of damselfly

Thaumatoneura inopinata is a species of damselfly, sometimes called the cascade damselfly or giant waterfall damsel, and the only member of the genus Thaumatoneura. It is unusual in flying among the falling water and spray from waterfalls in moist tropical or subtropical forests in Costa Rica.

== Taxonomy ==
Thaumatoneura inopinata is a highly distinctive species, making up a monotypic genus (Thaumatoneura) and subfamily (Thaumatoneurinae). It has been sometimes placed in the flatwing damselfly family Megapodagrionidae, but as a result of molecular phylogenetic studies by Dijkstra et al. in 2013, the genus Thaumatoneura is now considered one of two extant genera in the family Thaumatoneuridae.

The species was first described in 1897 by the English entomologist Robert McLachlan, but he did not know the origin of the specimen that he had bought as part of an insect collection. It later transpired that the damselfly was from the New World when another specimen was brought back from Panama.

The American entomologist Philip Powell Calvert visited Costa Rica and researched the species. The adult insects were seen in the vicinity of waterfalls, and nymphs were found on vegetated wet rocks, but it was some time before it was certain that these were of the same species. The matter was settled when one nymph was observed transforming into an adult. As the haemolymph was being pumped into the wings to expand them, the wings were at first pale green with blackish veins, and with the greenish body, the insect looked like a trembling, green leaf, exactly resembling the foliage close by.

== Distribution and habitat ==
The giant waterfall damsel is found in Costa Rica and Panama. Its natural habitats are subtropical or tropical moist montane forests and rivers where it is usually found in close vicinity to waterfalls.

== Description ==
Male giant waterfall damsels have two forms, one with entirely clear wings and the other with broad black bands across the wings. Females have clear wings with brown wing tips. In both sexes, the nodus (a notch in the leading edge of each wing) is closer to the base of the wings than is the case in most other damselfly species. When perched, the wings are held vertically above the abdomen, which allows water to drip off.

== Behaviour ==
The giant waterfall damsel can be seen flying among the falling water and spray produced by waterfalls. The eggs are laid among the mosses and tangled roots beside the cascade which are constantly kept wet by the water. The nymphs develop among this vegetation and do not normally enter the torrent. When their development is finished and they are ready to emerge, they climb onto a rock, their skin splits and the winged adults climb out.

== Status ==
The International Union for Conservation of Nature used to classify this species as "threatened" but more recently it has been found at an increasing number of locations in Costa Rica and although nowhere common, it is now assessed as being sufficiently numerous to be classified as "least concern". The chief threats it faces is deforestation, which alters stream habitats, and global warming which may cause some streams and waterfalls to dry up.

== Etymology ==
The genus name Thaumatoneura is presumably derived from the Greek θαῦμα (thauma, "wonder", "marvel") and νεῦρον (neuron, "nerve" or "sinew"). In odonate taxonomy, neuron is commonly used in reference to wing veins. The name refers to the extraordinary wing venation of the genus, which McLachlan regarded as highly unusual and unlike that of any other known damselfly.
