= Life in Cold Blood =

2008 British nature documentary series

- Region 2 DVD cover
- Genre: Nature documentary
- Presented by: David Attenborough
- Composers: David Poore; Ben Salisbury
- Country of origin: United Kingdom
- Original language: English
- No. of episodes: 5

Production
- Executive producer: Sara Ford
- Producers: Miles Barton; James Brickell; Hilary Jeffkins; Adam White
- Running time: 50 minutes
- Production company: BBC Natural History Unit

Original release
- Network: BBC One
- Release: 4 February – 3 March 2008

Related
- Life in the Undergrowth; David Attenborough: A Life on Our Planet

Life in Cold Blood is a BBC nature documentary series written and presented by David Attenborough, first broadcast in the United Kingdom from 4 February 2008 on BBC One.

A study of the evolution and habits of amphibians and reptiles, it is the sixth and last of Attenborough's specialised surveys following his major trilogy that began with Life on Earth, hence a ninth part for the eight series in The Life Collection.

The series comprises five 50-minute programmes, each one followed by Under the Skin, a 10-minute section that features Attenborough interviewing the scientists whose work has led to the sequences included in the main programme. It also examines the challenges faced by the crew and reveals some of the techniques used to film the series.

The series was produced by the BBC Natural History Unit in co-production with Animal Planet and The Open University. The executive producer is Sara Ford and the series producer is Miles Barton. The Under the Skin segments were produced by James Brickell in collaboration with the Open University. The score for the main films was composed by David Poore and Ben Salisbury, whilst the music for Under the Skin was written and performed by Tony Briscoe.

The series won the 2009 BAFTA Television Award in the Specialist Factual category. Within Attenborough's 'Life' series, it is preceded by Life in the Undergrowth (2005).

== Background ==
Filming began in the early part of 2006 and, as with Attenborough's previous series, the production team travelled the world to photograph the required sequences. In May 2006, Attenborough celebrated his 80th birthday in the Galápagos Islands while filming giant tortoises, one of which, called Lonesome George, was thought to be the same age. Lonesome George died on 24 June 2012; he was believed to have been more than 100 years old.

Several innovative techniques were used to capture footage. Thermal imaging cameras were used to demonstrate the creatures' variable body temperatures, probe cameras allowed access to underground habitats and even a matchbox-sized one was attached to the shell of a tortoise.

Expert scientists helped the producers to film animal behaviour that is rarely seen. The team 'staked out' radiotagged timber rattlesnakes in order to witness one of them despatching its prey. However, for Attenborough's close encounter with a spitting cobra, a captive snake that was used to being handled was placed in a natural setting and the presenter wore a face visor. Other examples of 'pets' being used were for sequences depicting the lassoing tongue of a chameleon (which had to be filmed at ultra-high speed) and the digestive system of a python (which was enhanced by computer-generated imagery).

Life in Cold Blood is Attenborough's last major series and also represents the final study in his 'Life' series, which comprises 79 programmes. In a 2008 interview, he stated:

The evolutionary history is finished. The endeavour is complete. If you'd asked me 20 years ago whether we'd be attempting such a mammoth task, I'd have said 'Don't be ridiculous'. These programmes tell a particular story and I'm sure others will come along and tell it much better than I did, but I do hope that if people watch it in 50 years' time, it will still have something to say about the world we live in.

However, although Attenborough was 81 years old at the time of the series' broadcast, he continued to assist the BBC Natural History Unit by providing narration for projects such as Nature's Great Events, Life and Frozen Planet.

Attenborough confirmed on the penultimate edition of Parkinson, broadcast on 16 December 2007, that he did not intend to retire completely and would still make occasional single documentaries, rather than any more series.

== Episodes ==
"Reptiles and amphibians are sometimes thought of as primitive, dull and dimwitted. In fact, of course, they can be lethally fast, spectacularly beautiful, surprisingly affectionate and very sophisticated."

— David Attenborough's opening words

No.	Title	Original release date
1	"The Cold Blooded Truth"	4 February 2008
The first episode discusses the keys to success of reptiles and amphibians, looking at thermoregulation, parental care and the time-scales on which reptiles operate. Attenborough begins in the Galápagos Islands, using thermal imaging to demonstrate how marine iguanas warm their bodies by basking in the sun before feeding. Meanwhile, the lizard inhabitants of a Menorcan island have a relationship with its indigenous dead horse arum plants. Attenborough visits Dassen Island to witness one of the world's greatest concentrations of tortoises – around 5,000 of them. Few reptiles are active at night, but crocodiles can rely on water that retains much of its daytime temperature. Conversely, amphibians' moist skin would be damaged by the sun and so most are nocturnal. An exception is the waxy monkey leaf frog, which can deal with sunlight by covering its body in a wax secretion. A puff adder illustrates the relative inactivity of reptiles compared to mammals: one large meal can last up to a year. When it hatches at the onset of winter, the young painted turtle stays underground, near frozen until the spring when it can emerge. Attenborough wonders if the dinosaurs' immense size allowed them to maintain warm blood. The leatherback turtle is able to retain body heat due to its large size and insulating body fat. Under the Skin looks at the hunt for the pygmy leaf chameleon, filmed in Madagascar.
2	"Land Invaders"	11 February 2008
The second programme explores the world of amphibians, of which there are some 6,000 known species. Attenborough visits Australia to illustrate how they became the first back-boned creatures to colonise land: the lungfish, which is capable of breathing air, and whose ancestors became the first amphibians. The largest of them is the Japanese giant salamander and two are shown wrestling for territory. In North America, the marbled salamander spends most of its life on land, yet is still able to retain the necessary moisture in its skin through the damp leaf litter. A female caecilian is filmed with her young, whose rapid growth is discovered to be the result of eating their mother's skin – re-grown for them every three days. The most successful amphibians are frogs and toads. Their calls are most active during the breeding season: females are impressed by both volume and frequency. However, gestures are sometimes needed and the poisonous Panamanian golden frog uses a conspicuous form of 'semaphore'. Most other frogs rely on camouflage and the South American red-eyed tree frog is an example. An African bullfrog is shown defending its exposed tadpoles by digging a canal for them. Meanwhile, the male marsupial frog keeps its young moist by carrying them in its skin pouches. Under the Skin examines the filming of the last population of Panamanian golden frogs, which is threatened by a fungal disease.
3	"Dragons of the Dry"	18 February 2008
The third instalment takes a look at the immense diversity, social skills and displays of the lizards. While they are highly adept at camouflage, occasionally there is a need to break cover in order to ward off rivals. Attenborough holds up a mirror to an anole and causes it to extend its colourful throat flap as a warning sign. Madagascar is host to over 60 species of chameleon but one of the largest, Meller's chameleon, is native to Malawi and two rival males are shown jousting. A female South African dwarf chameleon demonstrates its ability to change colour when communicating to a potential mate, and the chameleon's muscular tongue is depicted lassoing its prey. In southern Australia, Attenborough uses a baited fishing rod to attract the attention of a rare pygmy bluetongue skink, thought to have been extinct for over thirty years until it was rediscovered in 1992. Shinglebacks are among the most devoted lizards and breeding pairs can reunite each year for up to two decades. Alongside South Africa's Orange River, large groups of flat lizards feed on the swarms of black flies, but the males also use the occasion to indulge in social squabbling. The Mexican beaded lizard is one of the few with a poisonous bite, but males do not employ it when wrestling each other. Finally, Attenborough comes face to face with a perentie, Australia's largest monitor lizard. Under the Skin focuses on filming in Australia.
4	"Sophisticated Serpents"	25 February 2008
The fourth episode focuses on the most modern reptiles, the snakes, exploring how they have managed to become successful despite their elongated body shape. Attenborough explains how they evolved from underground burrowers to surface hunters, losing their limbs in the process. With the aid of infrared cameras, a timber rattlesnake is shown lying in wait for a mouse and sensing its repeated path before despatching and eating it. A snake's constantly flickering tongue is used to gather and evaluate the molecules of its surroundings, and Attenborough visits Carnac Island to witness a population of blind tiger snakes, which feed on the chicks of nesting gulls. He also confronts a Mozambique spitting cobra, which quickly sprays venom over the presenter's protective face visor. The similarities in colouration between the harmless kingsnake and potentially lethal coral snake are highlighted. An example of a snake that can tackle unusual prey is the Queen snake, which almost exclusively hunts newly-moulted crayfish. A pair of rival male King cobras are seen battling and infant cobras are shown hatching: their venom is immediately as fatal as that of their parents. In Argentina, a yellow anaconda evades nearby caimans to give birth to live young. Finally a turtle-headed sea snake feeds not on fish, but on their eggs laid on a coral reef. Under the Skin discusses the filming of timber rattlesnakes during inclement weather.
5	"Armoured Giants"	3 March 2008
The final programme covers the most ancient of the reptiles: the crocodiles and turtles. In the Galápagos Islands, among the giant tortoises, Attenborough explains how the creatures came to develop their shells as a defence against predators. This is demonstrated by the eastern box turtle, whose shell includes a hinged 'drawbridge'. The aquatic pig-nosed turtle is unusual in that its eggs need to be submerged before hatching, whereas those of other species would drown; Attenborough illustrates this by dropping an egg into a jar of water: it immediately hatches. In the open ocean, male sea turtles attempt to separate a rival from its mate by attacking and overwhelming the pair, stopping them from taking in air. In northern Australia, Attenborough observes a large gathering of crocodiles at a flooded coastal road: they time their arrival to ambush migrating mullet. The complex communication and body language of the American alligator is investigated and in Argentina, the calls of young caimans help their mother locate and lead them to a nursery pool. The mother's maternal instinct extends to releasing unhatched babies by gently crushing their eggs in its jaws. In Venezuela, a female spectacled caiman in charge of an entire crèche leads the infants from a drying river bed on a trek to permanent water. Under the Skin explores filming on the Galápagos Islands and Attenborough's meeting with Lonesome George.

"Reptiles and amphibians are sometimes seen as simple, primitive creatures. That's a long way from the truth. The fact that they are solar-powered means that their bodies require only 10% of the energy that mammals of a similar size require. At a time when we ourselves are becoming increasingly concerned about the way in which we get our energy from the environment and the wasteful way in which we use it, maybe there are things that we can learn from 'Life in Cold Blood'."

— David Attenborough, in closing

== DVD and book ==
A 2-disc DVD set of the series (BBCDVD2553) was released on 25 February 2008. The accompanying 288-page book, Life in Cold Blood by David Attenborough (ISBN 0-563-53922-4), was published by BBC Books on 7 December 2007, in advance of the television series. The Region 1 DVD was released on 5 August 2008 (S.R.P. $34.98) through Warner Home Video.
