= State of the Planet =

- Region 2 DVD cover
- Genre: Nature documentary
- Presented by: David Attenborough
- Composer: Sarah Class
- Country of origin: United Kingdom
- Original language: English
- No. of episodes: 3

Production
- Producer: Rupert Barrington
- Running time: 147 minutes
- Production company: BBC Natural History Unit

Original release
- Network: BBC One
- Release: 15 November – 29 November 2000

State of the Planet is a three-part environmental documentary series, made by the BBC Natural History Unit, transmitted in November 2000. It is written and presented by David Attenborough, and produced by Rupert Barrington. It includes interviews with many leading scientists, such as Edward O. Wilson and Jared Diamond. Each of the programmes attempts to find answers to the potential ecological crisis that threatens the Earth.

The series was specially commissioned by BBC One for the millennium, and had a budget of around GBP2 million. The BBC drew criticism for scheduling the first episode in competition with the final part of ITV's Inspector Morse; as a consequence, it drew just 4 million viewers, well below the channel's typical share. However, ratings recovered to around 7 million for the second and third programmes.

Attenborough fronted this series in between presenting his 1998 ornithological study, The Life of Birds, and providing narration to the award-winning 2001 series The Blue Planet.

== Programmes ==
=== 1. "Is There a Crisis?" ===
Broadcast 15 November 2000, together with leading experts, David Attenborough examines the latest scientific evidence in order to discover if the planet's ecosystems are really in crisis. If so, he asks how it could have come about, and what is so different now that prevents certain species from adapting to survive, as they did in the past?

=== 2. "Why Is There a Crisis?" ===
Broadcast 22 November 2000, Attenborough presents some stark facts. He states that humans are now triggering a mass extinction on a similar scale to that which wiped out the dinosaurs – but at an unprecedented rate. He investigates the five main activities of mankind that are the most likely contributory factors:

- Habitat loss
- Introduced species
- Pollution
- Over-harvesting
- Islandisation

=== 3. "The Future of Life" ===
Broadcast 29 November 2000, as Homo sapiens relentlessly encroaches on the natural world and its inhabitants, the viewer is presented with a choice: leave behind a flourishing planet or a dying one.

"The future of life on earth depends on our ability to take action. Many individuals are doing what they can, but real success can only come if there's a change in our societies and our economics and in our politics. I've been lucky in my lifetime to see some of the greatest spectacles that the natural world has to offer. Surely we have a responsibility to leave for future generations a planet that is healthy, inhabitable by all species."

— David Attenborough, in closing

== DVD ==
The complete series was released on DVD (BBCDVD1498) on 27 September 2004.
