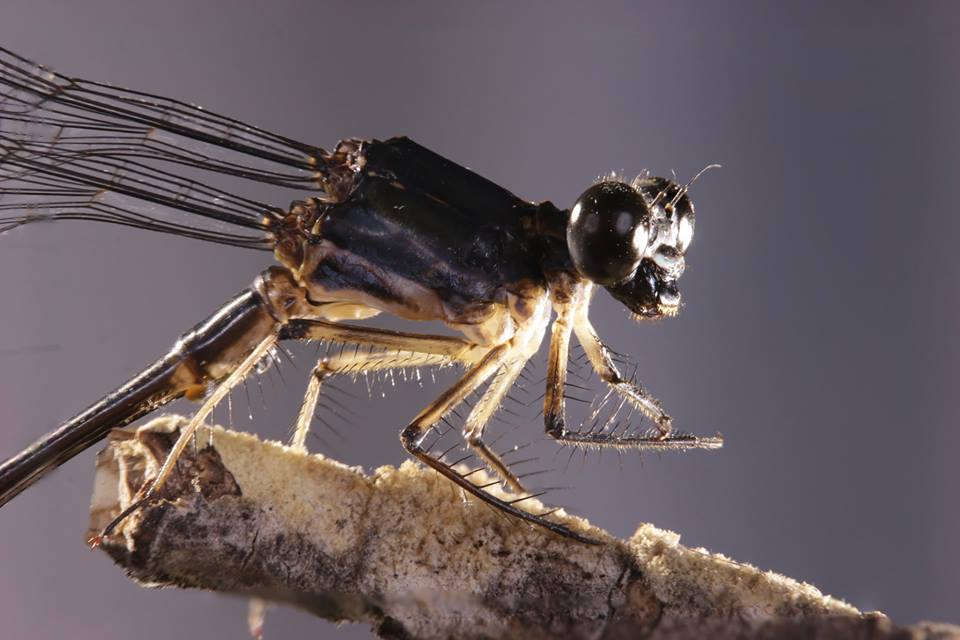
- Paraphlebia zoe

Scientific classification
- Kingdom: Animalia
- Phylum: Arthropoda
- Clade: Pancrustacea
- Class: Insecta
- Order: Odonata
- Suborder: Zygoptera
- Superfamily: Amphipterygoidea
- Family: Thaumatoneuridae; Tillyard & Fraser, 1938

Genera
- Paraphlebia; Thaumatoneura
- Distribution of Thaumatoneuridae

= Thaumatoneuridae =

Family of damselflies

Thaumatoneuridae is a family of damselflies in the superfamily Amphipterygoidea, found in Central America. The family contains the genera Paraphlebia and Thaumatoneura.

Members of the family are notable for their striking wing patterns and unusual variation between males of the same species. Because of their distinctive appearance, they have long been regarded as an unusual group of damselflies and have been placed in several different classifications.

Morphological and molecular studies now recognise them as a distinct family within the damselflies.

== Description ==
Thaumatoneurids typically rest with their wings closed above the body and often have wings marked with dark bands or patches. In some species males occur in two forms, with either clear wings or conspicuously marked wings.

The family is characterised by wings with numerous cross-veins and a dense network of veins near the wing margins. These unusual wing features attracted the attention of early odonatologists and played an important role in the classification of the group.

The larvae possess distinctive caudal appendages that are swollen at the base and end in filament-like tips bearing stout setae.

== Taxonomic history ==
The family-group name originated as Thaumatoneurinae, which was established as a new subfamily in Fraser's 1938 publication of an unfinished manuscript by Robin Tillyard. In the preface, Fraser explained that the work had been left incomplete by Tillyard's death in 1937 and was published with editorial notes and additions by Fraser.

Fraser later included Thaumatoneurinae within Pseudolestidae, a family he created in 1957 to accommodate several unusual damselfly genera that could not be satisfactorily placed in Megapodagrionidae. He regarded Thaumatoneura as one of several aberrant lineages occupying an intermediate position between the traditional Coenagrioidea and Agrioidea.

Molecular and morphological studies subsequently showed that the genera included in Pseudolestidae do not form a natural group. Dijkstra et al. (2014) recovered Paraphlebia and Thaumatoneura as a distinct lineage sharing features of the genital ligula, wing venation and larval morphology, and recognised them as the family Thaumatoneuridae. Later phylogenomic analyses supported this classification.

== Genera ==
The following genera are currently placed in Thaumatoneuridae:

- Paraphlebia Selys, 1861
- Thaumatoneura McLachlan, 1897

Several fossil genera have at various times been associated with Thaumatoneuridae on the basis of wing venation. Modern studies place these taxa in separate extinct lineages and they are no longer included in the family.

== Etymology ==
The family name Thaumatoneuridae is derived from the type genus Thaumatoneura, with the standard zoological family suffix -idae.

The genus name Thaumatoneura is presumably derived from the Greek θαῦμα (thauma, "wonder", "marvel") and νεῦρον (neuron, "nerve" or "sinew"). In odonate taxonomy, neuron is commonly used in reference to wing veins. The name likely refers to the extraordinary wing venation of the genus, which McLachlan regarded as highly unusual and unlike that of any other known damselfly.
