= Extinction: The Facts =

Documentary film by David Attenborough

- Genre: Documentary
- Narrated by: David Attenborough
- Country of origin: United Kingdom

Production
- Running time: 58 minutes

Original release
- Network: BBC One
- Release: 13 September 2020

Extinction: The Facts is a 2020 documentary film by the natural historian David Attenborough which aired on the BBC. It depicts the continuing sixth mass extinction, caused by humans, and the consequences of biodiversity loss and climate change. It also suggests positive action which can be taken to halt or reverse these effects. With a peak viewership of roughly 4.5 million on its premiere, the programme received positive critical reception.

== Synopsis ==
Attenborough and academic experts comment on the sixth mass extinction: humans are causing an animal and plant extinction rate roughly 100 times faster than has previously occurred. One million out of eight million species on the planet are at risk of extinction. An African conservationist watching over the two last northern white rhinoceroses, a mother and daughter, talks about how he has seen the species drawn nearer to extinction. One scientist comments that one in four recorded plant species are at risk of extinction.

Contributing factors to the mass extinction include poaching and the illegal wildlife trade, overfishing, population growth and human use of chemicals. Pangolin scales, in demand for Asian alternative medicine, are given as an example of poaching. An expert reports that in his lifetime, the human population has grown from two to seven billion and may grow further to nine billion. However, a more significant factor towards animal extinction is the amount of materials consumed by humans, much higher in the developed world. As an example of chemical effects, the toxin PCB could cause a loss of killer whales on the coast of the United Kingdom.

Experts say that countries are not on track to meet international targets such as the Paris Agreement, with a projection of three to four degrees of warming if human activity continues unchanged. Climate change is causing an "escalator to extinction", where animals need to move their habitats further upwards as the temperature changes until they are no longer able to survive in their conditions.

The documentary discusses demand in the United Kingdom for food products made in countries with little or no environmental regulations, which contributes to people's carbon footprints. It comments that soy from the Cerrado, a monoculture which has reduced biodiversity, is exported to the United Kingdom for use in chicken feed. Attenborough says that wildlife trade and other human interaction with animals cause viruses to spread, and can be initial causes of pandemics. He attributes the COVID-19 pandemic to human expansion into areas of Yunnan, with the virus perhaps spreading from bats to Wuhan via humans or animal markets. Experts warn that current human activity may lead to an increase in risk of frequent pandemics.

The documentary attributes blame to the private sector of the economy; the desire to increase profits leads to a disregard for the natural environment. Suggested solutions include retrofitting improved technologies to buildings, moving to solar energy and other renewable energy, reducing food waste, maintaining land conservation or producing meat or dairy more sustainably. Attenborough revisits the East African Virunga Mountains, where he interacted with mountain gorillas for his documentary series Life on Earth (1979). At the time, there were an estimated 250 mountain gorillas. Action taken by the Rwandan government to develop agriculture and use money from tourism to pay for rangers and conservation has led to a growth in the population to 1000 mountain gorillas. Attenborough ends on a hopeful message that positive change can be achieved.

== Production ==
External videos
- We need IMMEDIATE action to stop extinction crisis, David Attenborough - BBC on YouTube

The programme is different to Attenborough's usual works in that it gives a warning, rather than depicting positive images of biodiversity. Bangor University conservation professor Julia Patricia Gordon Jones appeared in the documentary. She had previously worked with crew on the 2015 series Our Planet, but expressed frustration that footage of Madagascar forest fires were cut from the series. She found Extinction: The Facts to be "surprisingly radical" compared to Attenborough's previous work.

The documentary is a follow-up to Attenborough's Climate Change – The Facts (2019). It premiered on 13 September 2020 on BBC One at 8 p.m. The audience peaked at an estimated 4.5 million viewers; BBC commissioner Jack Bootle reported that viewership rose by 600,000 over the course of the program. Attenborough's next work was the documentary film A Life on Our Planet, about Attenborough's career occurring while biodiversity loss escalated, which was released on Netflix in October 2020.

== Reception ==
Amelia Gentleman of The Observer rated the film five out of five stars, finding it "a heartbreaking hour, but essential television". She found it "immensely powerful" even disregarding the COVID-19 framing, due to the depiction of "extraordinary animals" at risk of extinction. Sean O'Grady of The Independent gave it four out of five stars, praising its "impressive collection" of talking heads and "genuinely moving" revisiting of the gorillas from Life on Earth. In a four star review for i, Emily Baker wrote that the film was a "vital source of education", praising its presentation of experts and its connection drawn between biodiversity and the COVID-19 pandemic.

Adam Vaughan of New Scientist found the programme an "overall success", praising its commentary on threats faced by pangolins and anteaters and coverage of topics such as population rise, overconsumption and the global supply chain, as well as its inclusion of a "diversity" of experts. However, Vaughan recommended that some topics could have been omitted to achieve better focus.
