= Authored documentary =

An authored documentary is a documentary that presents the subjective view of its author on the topic of the documentary. In sharp contrast to observational documentaries, which are supposed to be unbiased, authored documentaries are intended to present a definite point of view. They tend to be popular with audiences favoring the positions they advocate, because of their ability to mobilize popular opinion and interest. For the same reason, they tend to stimulate public controversy. At an extreme, authored documentaries may take the form of "hybrid" documentaries that incorporate techniques used in fiction.

== History ==
The authored documentary form was invented by Michael Gill and Adrian Malone.

== Examples ==
Authored documentaries include both feature films and television series. Authored documentaries originally made as feature films are often eventually presented on television; as films, they are generally exempt from the constraints on bias that are normally imposed on television programs.

=== Film ===
Among the best-known examples of the genre are An Inconvenient Truth, directed by Davis Guggenheim, and Super Size Me, directed by Morgan Spurlock. Michael Moore is also well known for his authored documentary films, including Bowling for Columbine, Capitalism: A Love Story, Fahrenheit 9/11, and Sicko.

=== Television ===
The format, expanding upon the presenter/author's thesis over a number of episodes was popularized with Kenneth Clark's landmark BBC 2 series Civilisation. The success of this series led to other authored documentaries being produced, including The Ascent of Man, Jacob Bronowski's partial refutation of Kenneth Clark's thesis that the major driving force of cultural evolution was the arts, not the sciences. The genre also includes documentary series like David Attenborough's Life on Earth, Carl Sagan's Cosmos, and Simon Schama's A History of Britain.

== Academic analysis ==
The notion of authorship for a documentary is in tension with the pressures of modern corporate radio, television, and film production, which tend toward consolidation of all claims of authorship in the corporate producer entity. In December 2009, the online media arts and culture journal Scan published a theme issue of articles on the topic of this tension.

== Awards and honors ==
In his will, Alan Whicker established cash awards to encourage the making of authored documentaries in the UK.
