= The First Eden =

- Region 2 DVD cover art
- Genre: Nature documentary
- Presented by: David Attenborough
- Composer: Carl Davis
- Country of origin: United Kingdom
- Original language: English
- No. of episodes: 4

Production
- Executive producer: Andrew Neal
- Running time: 55 minutes
- Production company: BBC Natural History Unit

Original release
- Network: BBC2
- Release: 8 March – 29 March 1987

The First Eden: The Mediterranean World and Man is a BBC documentary series written and presented by David Attenborough, first transmitted in the United Kingdom from 8 March 1987.

It comprises four programmes, each of 55 minutes' duration, which describe man's relationship with the natural habitats of the Mediterranean, and is a portrait of the landscape, wildlife and plants of the Mediterranean. From the earliest human settlements to the cities of today, from the forests of the North African shore and the Middle East to Southern Europe, this series tells a story of man and nature at work.

The series was produced by Andrew Neal, in association with the Australian Broadcasting Corporation and WQED Pittsburgh. The music was composed and conducted by Carl Davis.

Attenborough undertook the project in between his 'Life' series The Living Planet (1984) and The Trials of Life (1990).

== Episodes ==
"On the European shore, spring has come. [...] The asphodel and many other species including the wild gladiolus, scarlet crowfoot and 50-odd species of orchid have kept the surplus food they made last year stored underground in bulbs and swollen roots. At the first hint of spring they use those savings to produce flowers, in some cases, even before they've sprouted leaves. At the same time, neatly synchronised by the warming weather, insects are hatching. Now they are busy collecting the bribes of nectar, advertised by the flowers, as inducements to transport pollen. This is the banquet that the birds have come to feed on."

— Extract from David Attenborough's narration

=== 1. "The Making of the Garden" ===
In episode 1, Attenborough travels to Rhodes to witness the gathering of 1 million Jersey tiger moths

UK broadcast 8 March 1987

Attenborough opens the series at the Dead Sea, where the hot climate and intense evaporation mimic conditions that were replicated on a much larger scale when the newly formed Mediterranean basin dried out. Around 5.5 million years ago, the Atlantic flooded the basin, allowing marine life to recolonise the new sea. Mountains became islands: some of them volcanic, others formed of limestone. Common species marooned on these islands evolved into new varieties. In a Maltese cave, Attenborough discovers fossil teeth from dwarf elephants. Most are only known from fossils, but one species, the Mallorcan midwife toad, has recently been discovered. Attenborough abseils down to a secluded pool to find it. In Europe, blooming wildflowers signal the arrival of spring. This triggers the emergence of insects, and in turn, the arrival of insectivorous birds such as rollers and bee-eaters. After the Mediterranean Sea formed, the climate continued to warm, forcing many birds to extend their migration routes between Europe and Africa. Exotic arrivals include spoonbills, white storks and flamingos. Reptiles are most active during the hot summers. Attenborough catches a Montpellier snake and describes its hunting behaviour. Some creatures, including chameleons, crested porcupines and fruit bats have colonised Europe from Africa. Rock hyraxes, which have reached Israel, may soon join them. The arrival of humans, 28,000 years ago, is known from flint tools and rock etchings found in Spanish caves. Later cliff paintings demonstrated that Mediterranean man was still living in hunter-gatherer societies 10,000 years ago, but that would soon change.

=== 2. "The Gods Enslaved" ===
Attenborough in the Great Theatre of Ephesus, from a scene in "The Gods Enslaved"

UK broadcast 15 March 1987

Attenborough explores the influence of the first Mediterranean civilizations, placing the symbolism of the bull at the centre of his narrative. Cave paintings in France and Spain and Egyptian hieroglyphs both reveal cultures that revered the wild bull for its fertility and strength. The Ancient Egyptians deified many animals, including the living bull-god Apis, and accorded it the same ceremonial burial as their Pharaohs. Attenborough describes the ritual from the Temple of Apis in Memphis. At Saqqara, more than 4 million mummified sacred ibises were brought as offerings by devotees. Crop cultivation began in the Nile Delta, but the Minoans were the first to harvest olives, using oxen-powered mills to crush them. They were also skilled fishermen, whose traditional methods for catching octopus and tunny are still practised by modern North Africans. Attenborough explains how Cretan men pitted themselves against bulls in specially built arenas. The Romans were passionate hunters, using wild animals ransacked from their Empire for entertainment, but they also held the bull in special regard. The statue of Artemis, salvaged from the Temple of Ephesus, is adorned with bulls' testes. Of more than 600 Roman cities along the North African coast, Leptis Magna was the greatest. Its wealth was built on trading livestock and produce harvested from the surrounding fertile lands; figs, olives and grain. But in deforesting the land the Romans precipitated their own demise. Although humans had enslaved and subdued the bull, Attenborough concludes that they had yet to learn the value of the natural world.

"It was the Ephesians themselves who were flouting the principles of fertility by what they were doing to the land around their city. It used to be said in places like this that nature failed to support man. The truth is exactly the reverse: here, man failed to support nature."

— David Attenborough's summary at the end of episode 2

=== 3. "The Wastes of War" ===
UK broadcast 22 March 1987

The relationship between man and horse has a long history in the Mediterranean region. A passion for horses spread west from Central Asia, but took a while to become established as a pastoral way of life returned. The Roman Empire was replaced by marauding Huns, Visigoths and Vandals. In the seventh century, Arabian cavalrymen took Jerusalem and arrived in Spain to spread the word of the Qur'an. They established bases at Córdoba and Granada, bringing orange trees and peacocks for the gardens of their impressive mosques. The Arabs brought their falconry skills too. The birds are used to this day to catch desert animals such as hares and houbara bustards. Many attitudes towards animals stemmed from pre-Christian beliefs. Fire salamanders were suspected of having magical powers, while the mandrake was thought to be deadly to those who harvested its roots. Even today, Cocullo holds an annual festival of snakes, the animals thought to bring protection. Attenborough visits the impregnable Krak des Chevaliers in Syria to discuss the Crusades. Black rats carried on the retreating Christian army's ships spread plague through Europe, killing a third of the population. During the Middle Ages the forests of Southern Europe were cleared. Attenborough discusses the deforestation caused by Spanish Merino sheep grazing and the Venetian shipbuilding industry. Despite the advent of the internal combustion engine, horses still play an important role in European culture. The final scenes show thoroughbreds racing at Newmarket and a performance by the Spanish Riding School in Vienna.

=== 4. "Strangers in the Garden" ===
UK broadcast 29 March 1987

The final episode examines man's impact on the Mediterranean during the twentieth century. Attenborough dines on red soldierfish in Cyprus, one of a hundred or so species to have colonised the Mediterranean from the Red Sea, via the Suez Canal. Other invaders have been less welcome. The Phylloxera aphid from North America attacked French grapevines, and only by importing insect-resistant rootstock from the USA was a total catastrophe averted. The growth of tourism has led to uncontrolled development of hotels and marinas, squeezing out natural inhabitants of the coast such as Mediterranean monk seals and loggerhead turtles, who come ashore to lay their eggs. The sea is in danger of becoming barren due to overfishing and pollution. Attenborough dives beneath the surface to demonstrate the difference between a thriving seagrass ecosystem and one smothered in sedimentation from untreated sewage. Meanwhile, in Egypt, he looks at the damaging effects of damming the Nile, which include reduced productivity, a collapse of Egypt's sardine fishery and population displacement. The shooting of millions of migrating birds, draining of wetlands and deliberately started wildfires add to the pressures on the natural world. There are, however, still a few places where the Mediterranean has been left unspoilt. One is Plitvice in Croatia, whose mixed forests provide shelter for many creatures driven or hunted out elsewhere. In the uninhabited Sporades Islands east of mainland Greece, Mediterranean rarities such as Audouin's gull, Eleonora's falcon and the European black vulture can still breed freely.

== DVDs and book ==
The First Eden was released as a Region 2 2-disc DVD (BBCDVD2402) on 27 August 2007. The series forms part of the Region 2 DVD encyclopaedia Life on Land, which was released on 3 November 2008. It is also available (albeit without the final episode) on the Region 1 and Region 4 BBC Atlas of the Natural World DVD box sets.

The accompanying book, The First Eden: The Mediterranean World and Man by David Attenborough (ISBN 0-002-19827-4), was published by Collins on 9 March 1987.
