= Richard Brock =

British television and film producer (1938–2024)

Richard Brock (22 December 1938 – 30 December 2024) was a British television and film producer. He worked in the BBC as a natural history film producer for 35 years. Brock was a member of the production team on the highly successful David Attenborough series Life on Earth (1979) and served as executive producer on The Living Planet (1984).

Concerned by the lack of willingness to address the real state of the environment, he left the BBC and started his own independent production company, Living Planet Productions, which has made over 100 films on a wide range of environmental topics, and set up the Brock Initiative, which is undertaking a number of pilot projects in different countries.

Brock lived in Chew Magna, Somerset. He died in Bristol on 30 December 2024, at the age of 86.
