= The Living Planet =

1984 British nature documentary television series

- Region 2 DVD cover
- Genre: Nature documentary
- Directed by: Ian Calvert; Richard Matthews
- Presented by: David Attenborough
- Composer: Elizabeth Parker
- Country of origin: United Kingdom
- Original language: English
- No. of episodes: 12

Production
- Executive producer: Richard Brock
- Producers: Ned Kelly; Adrian Warren; Andrew Neal; Richard Brock
- Running time: 55 minutes
- Production companies: BBC Natural History Unit; Time-Life

Original release
- Network: BBC1
- Release: 19 January – 12 April 1984

Related
- Life on Earth; The Trials of Life

The Living Planet: A Portrait of the Earth is a BBC nature documentary series written and presented by David Attenborough, first transmitted in the UK from 19 January 1984.

The sequel to his pioneering Life on Earth, it is a study of the ways in which living organisms, including humans, adapt to their surroundings. Each of the twelve 55-minute episodes (one fewer than his previous series) featured a different environment. The executive producer was Richard Brock and the music was composed by Elizabeth Parker of the BBC Radiophonic Workshop.

Part of Attenborough's Life series, it was followed by The Trials of Life (1990). However, before the latter, Attenborough wrote and presented two shorter series: The First Eden (1987), about man's relationship with the natural habitats of the Mediterranean, and Lost Worlds, Vanished Lives (1989), concerning the discovery of fossils.

== Background ==
The programmes were just as ambitious to produce as those in the previous series, each featuring a variety of locations from around the world.

Among the most difficult places, in terms of logistics, was the Sudan, where the crew had to be flown in—despite there being no runways or indeed roads. Conversely, areas such as the Himalayas permitted no transportation at all, so the only option was to walk. In South America, a shortage of boats led to one cameraman having to push his equipment in a rubber dinghy, while he himself swam behind it.

Some subjects proved even more challenging: the production team had to wait two years for news to arrive of an erupting volcano, and had to suspend all other filming in the hope that it would still be alight when they reached it. Elsewhere, cameraman Hugh Miles had to put himself 25 yards (23 m) away from a polar bear in order to film it in close-up.

For the episode "The Sky Above", the series' makers managed to secure the services of NASA, and the use of its gravity research aircraft, affectionately known as the Vomit Comet.

However, the most time-consuming sequence involved red-breasted geese in flight—not in terms of actual filming, but in preparing for it. The birds had to be reared by hand from birth so that they would respond to the voice of their 'mother', and this eventually enabled them to be photographed as they flew alongside a moving open-top car.

Filming techniques continued to evolve. One new piece of equipment used was a scuba diving suit with a large, fully enclosed faceplate, allowing Attenborough to speak (and be seen) underwater.

In an interview on the making of the series, Attenborough was self-effacing concerning his own contribution:

"The difficulties are not actually experienced by me, because the bits that I do are the easiest bits. [...] It's not too difficult to walk on to a rock and look at a camera and say something. The difficulties are those that are encountered by the cameramen, directors and recordists, who actually have to get an animal doing something which perhaps nobody's ever even seen before. Those are extremely difficult things to do."

== Episodes ==
"Our planet, the Earth, is, as far as we know, unique in the universe. It contains life. Even in its most barren stretches, there are animals. Around the equator, where those two essentials for life, sunshine and moisture, are most abundant, great forests grow. And here plants and animals proliferate in such numbers that we still have not even named all the different species. Here, animals and plants, insects and birds, mammals and man live together in intimate and complex communities, each dependent on one another. Two-thirds of the surface of this unique planet are covered by water, and it was here indeed that life began. From the oceans, it has spread even to the summits of the highest mountains as animals and plants have responded to the changing face of the Earth."

— David Attenborough's opening narration

=== 1. "The Building of the Earth" ===
Broadcast 19 January 1984, the first episode begins in the world's deepest valley: that of the Kali Gandaki river in the Himalayas. Its temperatures range from those of the tropics in its lower reaches to that of the poles higher up. It therefore shows how creatures become adapted to living in certain environments. The higher that Attenborough travels, the more bleak and mountainous is the terrain, and the more suited to it are the animals that live there. However, such adaptations are comparatively recent: these mountains were formed from the sea bed some 65 million years ago. To show the force of nature responsible for this, Attenborough stands in front of an erupting volcano in Iceland and handles a piece of basalt; the Giant's Causeway is an example of what happens to it over a great length of time. The Icelandic volcanoes represent the northern end of a fissure that is mostly underwater and runs down one side of the globe, forming volcanic islands en route where it is above sea level. It is such activity, known as plate tectonics, from deep within the Earth that pulled apart Africa and South America and created the Atlantic Ocean. Footage of the eruption of Mount St. Helens in 1980 shows what decimation it caused. However, this pales in comparison to the destruction caused by Krakatoa in 1883, which Attenborough relates in detail. When such pressure beneath the Earth shifts, it results in hot springs and caverns—which themselves support life. This episode has the alternative title of "The Furnaces of the Earth" on the four-disc BBC DVD box set (BBCDVD1234).

=== 2. "The Frozen World" ===
Broadcast 26 January 1984, this programme describes the inhospitable habitats of snow and ice. Mount Rainier in America is an example of such a place: there is no vegetation, therefore no herbivores and thus no carnivores. However, beneath its frosty surface, algae grow and some insects, such as ladybirds visit the slopes. Africa's mountains are permanently snow-covered, and beneath peaks such as Kilimanjaro and Mount Kenya, there are unique communities of plants and animals. However, they endure extremes of temperature within 24 hours like no other. At night they are in danger of freezing solid, and during the day they may be robbed of moisture. Giant Senecioss and Lobelias combat this by (among other adaptations) insulating their growing points or stems with a dense layers of leaves or producing pectin-filled water reservoirs. The Andes run the length of South America and are surrounded by the altiplano. On these high plains there is a large and varied population of animals. Antarctica is bigger than the whole of Europe and is for the most part devoid of life. However, its shores and waters are fertile and are home to fur seals, their main food (krill), and several species of penguin. By contrast, because of its connection to more temperate regions, the Arctic has been colonised by a large variety of species. They include Arctic foxes, polar bears, lemmings, snowy owls, and the region's most powerful hunter, the Inuit. It is also a temporary home to migratory animals, such as the caribou and snow goose.

=== 3. "The Northern Forests" ===
Broadcast 2 February 1984, the next instalment examines the northern coniferous forests. The programme begins in northern Norway, 500 kilometres north of the Arctic Circle. Here, there is only just enough light for the pine trees to survive, but it is extremely cold during the winter. Pine cone seeds provide one of the few foods available at this time of year, and large herbivores such as the moose must also rely on their fat reserves. However, there are predators, including lynxes, wolverines and eagle owls. The coniferous forest grows in a belt right around the globe, some 1,900 kilometres across at its widest. On each continent, many migratory animals arrive in the spring, and even more during the summer. In years when the vole population is high, the numbers of their main predator, the owls, increase correspondingly and spread out. Further south, the warmer climate sees the pine trees give way to broad-leaved species, such as the oak and beech. More birds occupy the forest canopy during the summer than at any other time of year, feeding on a myriad of insects. At the onset of winter, many animals in these forests hibernate, and in America, Attenborough uncovers the den of a black bear, which can be asleep for six months at a time. Finally, further south still, Attenborough discovers the effects of forest fires, which are not so destructive as they appear—the areas affected rejuvenate themselves within a couple of months, with more flowers than before.

=== 4. "Jungle" ===
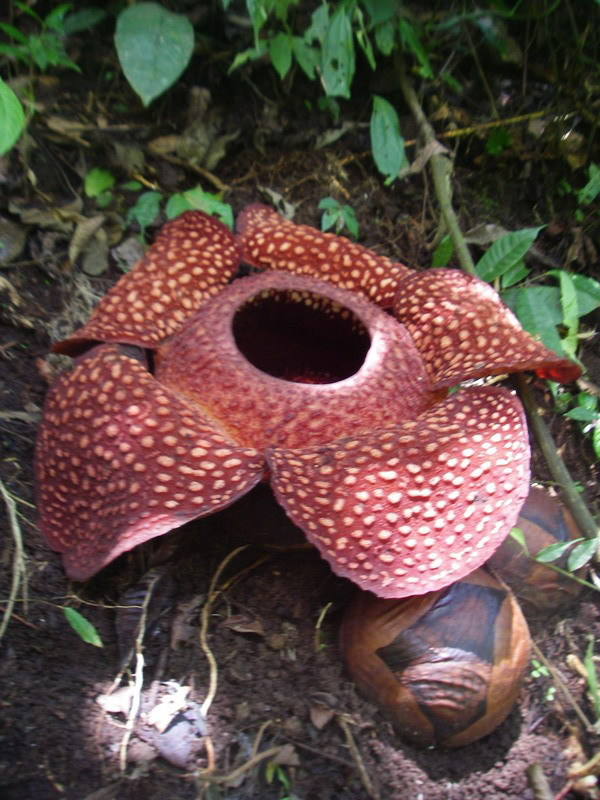
The Sumatran Rafflesia, "the most spectacular of all growths on the forest floor"

Broadcast 9 February 1984, this episode is devoted to the jungles of the tropics. Attenborough ascends a Ceiba pentandra (kapok) in the South American tropical rainforest to observe "the greatest proliferation of life that you can find anywhere on the surface of the Earth." There are two main causes for this: warmth and wetness. As this climate is constant, there are no seasons, so trees vary greatly in their flowering cycles. However, each species does so at the same time and, because of the lack of wind, relies on birds and insects for pollination. Bromeliads have their own population of visitors, largely due to their chalice-like rosettes of leaves that hold water. This is used by some for drinking, or, as in the case of the poison dart frog, for depositing tadpoles. Attenborough also highlights those species that have perfected the art of camouflage, including phasmids. The most densely populated part of the jungle is in its uppermost reaches. Around halfway down, there is little life, apart from those that inhabit nest holes, such as macaws, or use the trunks and lianas to aid movement. The jungle floor is not very fertile as the rain washes away any nutriment from the soil. Tree roots therefore rely on a kind of compost formed from decaying leaves—a process that is greatly accelerated in the natural humidity. After a tropical storm, an aged kapok tree comes crashing to the ground, leaving a gap in the canopy above. The process of renewal then begins as saplings race to fill the space created.

=== 5. "Seas of Grass" ===
Broadcast 16 February 1984, this programme looks at a plant of which there are some 10,000 species and which covers over a quarter of vegetated land: the grasses. It is a plant that keeps growing despite continuous grazing—because a grass leaf grows at its base, which is permanently active. At such low levels, lizards prey on insects, praying mantises eat grasshoppers, spiders hunt anything they can and dung beetles clear up the mess. Termites are among the most successful: in the savannah of Brazil, there are more termite mounds per acre than anywhere else—and where they flourish, the anteater follows. At dawn on the Brazilian campo, many open-nesting birds are vulnerable to species such as the tegu. There are few trees because of little water and during the dry season, caiman and turtles vie for space in such pools as there are. Three thousand kilometres to the north, in Venezuela, the clay soil enables the Llanos to hold flood water, and some creatures, such as the capybara, relish it. Further north still, on the North American prairie, the freezing temperature of minus 46 °C means that few animals can survive it; the bison is one that can. The African plains have a greater variety and bigger concentration of grass-living animals than any other. This leads to a similar abundance of predators, and the Merle people ambush white-eared kob as they cross a river. Of the million animals that attempt the crossing over several days, some 5,000 are killed.

=== 6. "The Baking Deserts" ===
Broadcast 23 February 1984, the next instalment explores the world of deserts. It begins in the largest, the Sahara, where the highest land temperatures have been recorded. Rock paintings depict creatures such as giraffes and antelopes, suggesting that at one point there was enough vegetation to support them. Now, such life has all but disappeared, with the exception of the cypress, whose roots find water deep underground. Since the night brings low temperatures, many of the creatures that live there are nocturnal. They include fennec foxes, geckos, jerboas and caracals. A scorpion is shown fighting a black widow spider. During the day, the desert belongs to the reptiles, which rely on the sun to warm their bodies. The Sonoran Desert is home to the Gila monster, one of a few poisonous lizards. By mid-afternoon, it's so hot that even reptiles must escape the sun's rays. However, some birds have developed methods for keeping cool. The sandgrouse evaporates moisture by fluttering its throat, while the roadrunner also uses its tail as a parasol. Plants that are best adapted to the habitat are the creosote bush and cacti, of which the saguaro is one of the biggest. The nomadic Tuareg people cross the Sahara from one side to the other—but cannot do so unaided. They rely on the camel for transportation, as much as it needs them to periodically dig for water. Despite this, it is one of the best adapted desert animals: it can go without water for ten times as long as a man.

=== 7. "The Sky Above" ===
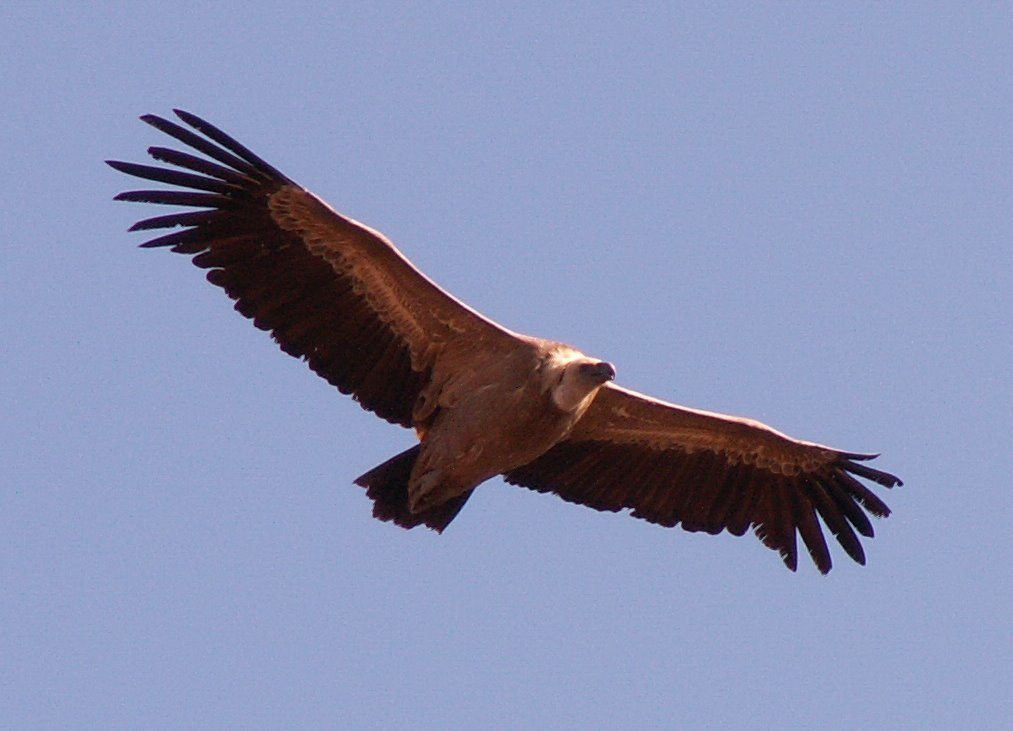
The griffon vulture, soaring.

Broadcast 1 March 1984, this episode deals with the air and those creatures that spend most of their lives in it. Attenborough begins in NASA's gravity research aircraft to illustrate the effect of weightlessness. There are surprisingly many plants whose seeds are, in effect, lighter than air. Gossamer is the animal equivalent, spun by tiny spiders. Only the very smallest plants and animals can defy gravity, but some seeds, such as those of the sycamore, cheat this by simulating the movement of a helicopter. Many creatures are expert gliders, such as the flying frog and some species of lizard. However, those that live at grass level must use powered flight, sometimes aided with a leap, as with the grasshopper. Attenborough observes albatrosses in South Georgia exploiting the air currents above cliffs to glide all day. Heavy birds like vultures wait for the land to heat up and provide thermals before they attempt any lengthy flight. The techniques of diving birds, such as the gannet or the peregrine falcon, are shown. Migratory birds are also explored in detail, and a multitude assembles above Panama each autumn. The red-breasted goose migrates entirely overland, and so can stop for fuel every night—unlike those that cross the open ocean. Finally, Attenborough ascends 6.5 kilometres into the atmosphere in a hot air balloon. It is this space that contains the Earth's weather, and satellite imagery is used to illustrate the formation of hurricanes and tornados.

=== 8. "Sweet Fresh Water" ===
Broadcast 8 March 1984, this programme focuses on freshwater habitats. Only 3% of the world's water is fresh, and Attenborough describes the course of the Amazon, starting high up in the Andes of Peru, whose streams flow into the great river. Young rivers are by nature vigorous and dangerous: they flow fast and form rapids, thick with mud and sediment. They accumulate sand and gravel en route, and this erodes all but the hardest surrounding rocks. The Yellow River of China carries the most sediment of any river. By the time it has settled down and fallen over its last cascade, the water becomes tranquil and rich with nutrients from its banks. It begins to form lakes, and where the water flows into basins created by geological faults, they can be immense. When water reaches such areas, it loses its impetus and drops its sediment, potentially making it very fertile. Lake Baikal in Russia is the deepest: 1,500 metres. In addition, 80% of its inhabitants are unique, including the Baikal seal. There are many examples of creatures that thrive in such an environment. Predators lie in wait above the surface (kingfishers), below it (turtles), on it (water boatmen), and at its edge (fishing spiders). In its final stages, a river's tributaries are liable to burst their banks and flood. However, some have made a virtue of this: the Marsh Arabs of Iraq construct their buildings on rafts of reeds. This allows fish, pelicans and humans to flourish in a single community.

=== 9. "The Margins of the Land" ===
Broadcast 15 March 1984, this instalment details coastal environments and the effect of tides, of which the highest can be found in the Bay of Fundy in North America. In places, erosion is causing the land to retreat, while in others—such as the tropics—the expansion of mangroves causes it to advance. Mussels keep their shells closed at low tide to deter attackers but the oystercatcher is adept at dealing with them. Other estuary-wading birds, which have developed a multitude of techniques for gathering food from mud flats, include godwits, curlews, dunlins, ringed plovers and avocets. While glasswort grows on many European tidal banks, the mangroves of the tropics are extensive. The largest forest is in the Sundarbans at the mouth of the Ganges and is 370 square metres in size. Where waves meet rocks and cliffs, the bands between low and high tides are narrow, and creatures have developed according to their dietary and safety needs. Mussels are preyed on by starfish, and so ensure that they are out of reach at low tide. Barnacles are higher still and feed on microscopic particles. On a Costa Rican beach, Attenborough observes female ridley turtles arriving at the rate of some 5,000 an hour to deposit their eggs. Finally, he discovers the largest turtle, the giant leatherback, also laying eggs. He remarks that despite its great size, little is known about it—except that its eggs are easily plundered, thus making it an endangered species.

=== 10. "Worlds Apart" ===
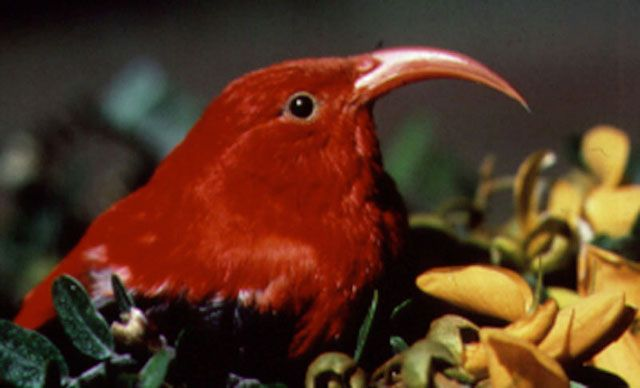
The ʻIʻiwi is an endemic bird of Hawaii.

Broadcast 22 March 1984, this episode investigates remote islands and their inhabitants. Some islands are tips of volcanoes; others are coral atolls. Those that colonise them transform into new species with comparative speed. Attenborough visits Aldabra in the Indian Ocean, which is 400 kilometres from the African coast. It has a vast population of sooty terns, which enjoy a degree of protection from predators that is unavailable on the mainland. The giant tortoise has also proliferated, despite the inhospitable nature of the landscape. Many island birds become flightless, including the Aldabran rail and the extinct dodo of Mauritius. Living in such isolation seems to allow some species to outgrow their mainland cousins, and Attenborough observes a group of feeding Komodo dragons at close quarters. The volcanic islands of Hawaii have become rich in vegetation and therefore a multitude of colonists: for example, there are at least 800 species of drosophila that are unique to the area. Polynesians reached Hawaii well over a thousand years ago, and their sea-going culture enabled them to reach many Pacific islands, including Easter Island, where they carved the moai, and New Zealand: the ancestors of the Māori. Attenborough highlights the kakapo as a species that was hunted to near-extinction. It is a facet of animal island dwellers that they have developed no means of self-defence, since their only predators are those that have been introduced by humans.

=== 11. "The Open Ocean" ===
Broadcast 29 March 1984, this programme concentrates on the marine environment. Attenborough goes underwater himself to observe the ocean's life forms and comment on them at first hand. He states that those that live on the sea bed are even more varied than land inhabitants. Much sea life is microscopic, and such creatures make up part of the marine plankton. Some animals are filter feeders and examples include the manta ray, the basking shark and the largest, the whale shark. Bony fish with their swim bladders and manoeuvrable fins dominate the seas, and the tuna is hailed as the fastest hunter, but the superiority of these types of fish did not go unchallenged: mammals are also an important component of ocean life. Killer whales, dolphins, narwhals and humpback whales are shown, as well as a school of beluga whales, which congregate annually in a bay in the Canadian Arctic—for reasons unknown. Marine habitats can be just as diverse as those on dry land. Attenborough surmises that the coral reef, with its richness of life, is the water equivalent of the jungle. Where the breezes of the Gulf Stream meet those of the Arctic, the resulting currents churn up nutrients, which lead to vegetation, the fish that eat it, and others that eat them. Attenborough remarks that it is man who has been most responsible for changing ocean environments by fishing relentlessly, but in doing so has also created new ones for himself—and this leads to the final episode.

=== 12. "New Worlds" ===
Broadcast 12 April 1984, the final instalment surveys those environments that have been created by and for humans. Man has spread to all corners of the globe—not because he has evolved to suit his surroundings, but because he has exploited the adaptations of other animal species. Despite being in existence for 500,000 years, it was not until 9,000 years ago that man began to create his own habitat, and in Beidha, in Jordan, Attenborough examines the remains of one of the earliest villages. Its inhabitants owned animals, and this domestication spread to Europe, eventually arriving in Britain. Much of the UK's landscape is man-made: for example, the South Downs were once a forest and the Norfolk Broads are the flooded remains of pits dug 600 years ago. Man also shaped his land by ridding himself of certain species and introducing others. He changed plants by harvesting them: the vast wheat fields of America now constitute a monoculture, where no other species are permitted. The same can be said for cities, which were constructed entirely for man's benefit. While humans are good at managing unwanted species (such as rats and other vermin), Attenborough argues that man has failed to look after natural resources and highlights the ignorance in assuming that the Earth has an infinite capacity to absorb waste. The now acidic, lifeless lakes of Scandinavia are examples that are "shameful monuments to our carelessness and lack of concern."

"Immensely powerful though we are today, it's equally clear that we’re going to be even more powerful tomorrow. And what's more there will be greater compulsion upon us to use our power as the number of human beings on Earth increases still further. Clearly we could devastate the world. [...] As far as we know, the Earth is the only place in the universe where there is life. Its continued survival now rests in our hands."

— David Attenborough, in closing

== Merchandise ==
The series is available in the UK for Regions 2 and 4 as a four-disc DVD set (BBCDVD1234, released 1 September 2003) and as part of The Life Collection. Its sole extra feature is a 40-minute documentary: The Making of The Living Planet. The first episode is erroneously listed on the DVD cover as "The Furnaces of the Earth". It is also available in a four-disc set in Region 1, released 25 November 2003 by Time-Life Video, with the episode order significantly rearranged, and Attenborough's lead-in from one episode to the next accordingly truncated.

The accompanying book, The Living Planet: A Portrait of the Earth by David Attenborough (ISBN 0-563-20207-6), was published by BBC Books on 2 February 1984. In addition, The Making of The Living Planet by Andrew Langley (ISBN 0-04-778002-9) was published by George Allen & Unwin in 1985. Both were out of print. In 2022, a newly updated edition, The Living Planet: The Web of Life on Earth, was released (ISBN 9780008477820).

An LP of Elizabeth Parker's score for the series, entitled The Living Planet: Music from the BBC TV Series was released in 1984. It was reissued by Silva Screen on 12 August 2016.

== Miles Kington ==
- The Making of The Living Planet is presented by the humorist Miles Kington, who introduces David Attenborough in his own style:

"One thing that distinguishes men from other living creatures is that only men make films about other living creatures, and perhaps one of the most famous and interesting of these film makers is the species known as David Attenborough. Somewhat shy and not always easy to film in his natural habitat, we're lucky here to see the David Attenborough at work on his latest and greatest project, The Living Planet. His mission: to search out and photograph everything from volcanoes to jellyfish to explain how the Earth works. Now, for this, his habitat is totally useless. In London where he lives, in Bristol where he works, there are no volcanoes and no jellyfish, so he has to travel thousands of miles to search out his prey. Now, for this he has the necessary boundless curiosity and endless energy. What he doesn't have is the vast quantity of money and expertise that only the BBC can offer. He enjoys this rather strange, symbiotic relationship with the BBC, an odd and apparently friendly organism, whose workings we do not yet fully understand..."
