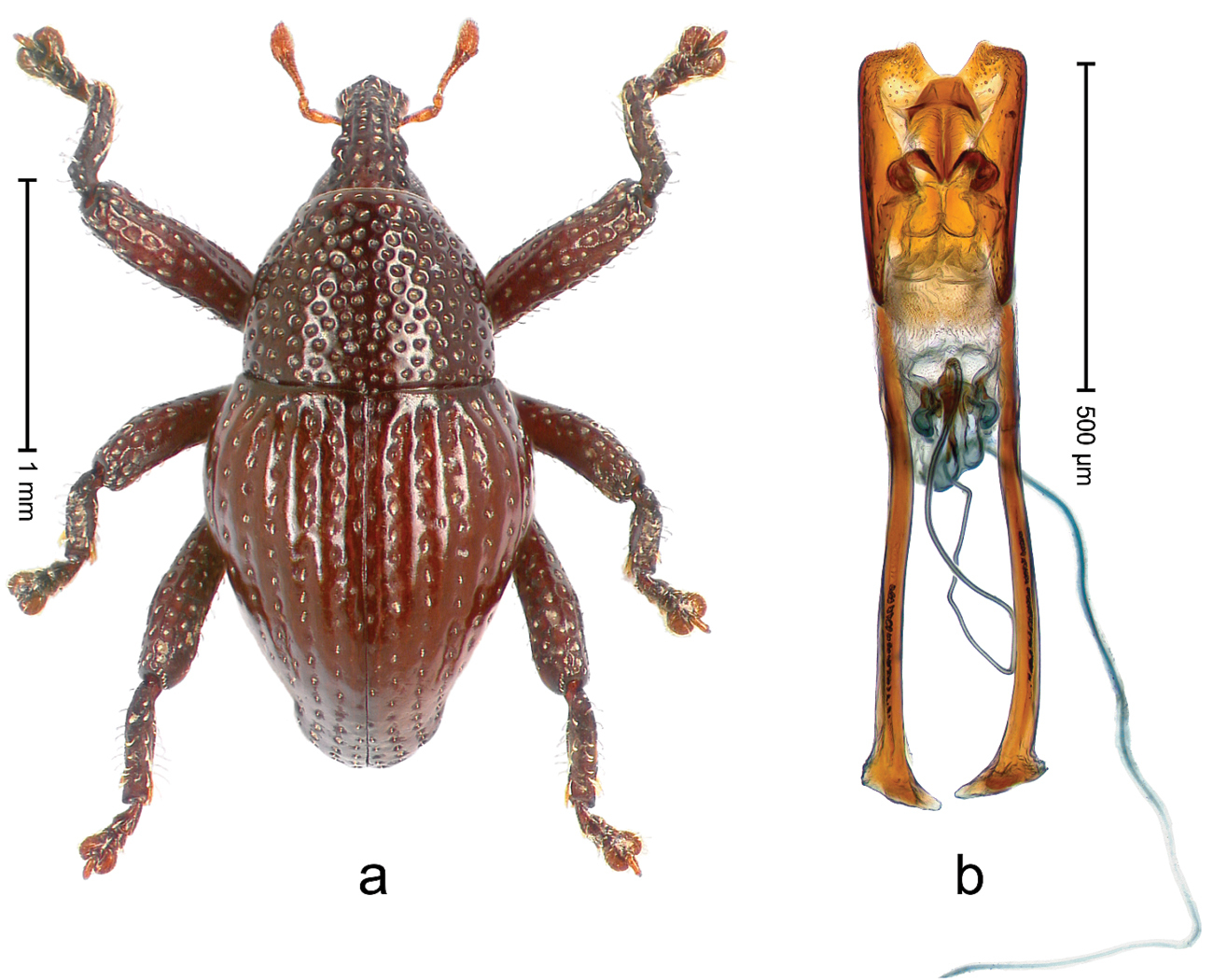

Scientific classification
- Kingdom: Animalia
- Phylum: Arthropoda
- Class: Insecta
- Order: Coleoptera
- Suborder: Polyphaga
- Infraorder: Cucujiformia
- Family: Curculionidae
- Genus: Trigonopterus
- Species: T. attenboroughi

Binomial name
- Trigonopterus attenboroughi Riedel, 2014

= Trigonopterus attenboroughi =

Species of beetle

Trigonopterus attenboroughi is a species of flightless weevil in the family Curculionidae, from Borneo.

== Etymology ==
The species was named after English naturalist Sir David Attenborough.

== Description ==
It has recurring indentations reminiscent of a strawberry. The body is almost oval. Length is around 2.1–2.6 mm. General coloration is rust-colored, with the head and pronotum being almost black.

== Range ==
The species was found at an elevation of 652 metres (2,139 ft) on Mount Bawang in the Indonesian province of West Kalimantan in Borneo.

== Phylogeny ==
The species is part of the T. attenboroughi species group.

== See also ==
- List of things named after David Attenborough and his works
