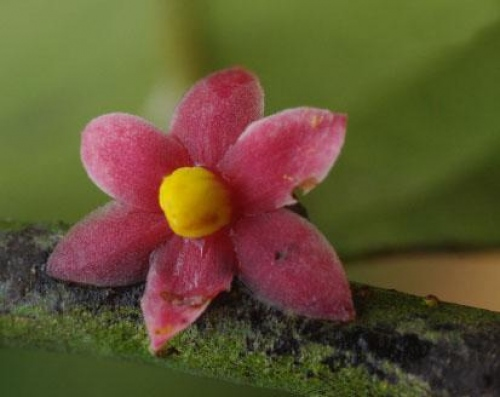

Conservation status
- Vulnerable (IUCN 3.1)

Scientific classification
- Kingdom: Plantae
- Clade: Embryophytes
- Clade: Tracheophytes
- Clade: Spermatophytes
- Clade: Angiosperms
- Clade: Magnoliids
- Order: Magnoliales
- Family: Annonaceae
- Genus: Sirdavidia; Couvreur & Sauquet
- Species: S. solannona

Binomial name
- Sirdavidia solannona Couvreur & Sauquet

= Sirdavidia =

Genus of flowering plants

Sirdavidia is a monotypic genus of flowering plants from the family Annonaceae described February 4, 2015, by Thomas L.P. Couvreur of France's Institute of Research for Development, Raoul Niangadouma of the Herbier National du Gabon, Bonaventure Sonké of the University of Yaoundé, and Hervé Sauquet of Université Paris-Sud. The genus was named in honor of Sir David Attenborough. The type species Sirdavidia solannona was discovered and collected in Gabon in Crystal Mountains National Park on November 15, 2013, at elevations of 300–600 meters. The species name refers to the resemblance of the flowers to those of Solanum species.

== Description ==
Sirdavidia is distinguished from other Annonaceae by its floral morphology, which is indicative of buzz pollination, a phenomenon that has never been observed in Annonaceae or Magnoliidae but is common amongst Solanaceae.

This species is a tree growing about 4 to 6 meters tall with a narrow trunk just a few centimeters wide. The leaves are up to 26 centimeters long by 9 wide, roughly oval in shape with long, pointed tips. The inflorescences occur in the leaf axils and directly from the trunk. There are male and bisexual flowers. Each is made up of three whorls: one whorl of red sepals and two whorls of red petals. As the flower blooms the petals spread outward and sometimes curl backward toward the stalk. At the center are 16 to 19 stamens with bright yellow tips. The mature fruit and seeds have not yet been described.

== See also ==
- List of things named after David Attenborough and his works
