= Life on Land =

Documentary series by David Attenborough

DVD cover artwork

David Attenborough's Life on Land: A DVD Encyclopaedia is a DVD box set of nature documentaries made by the BBC Natural History Unit. It comprises six series spread across 15 discs, all of them written and presented by David Attenborough, and together forming a comprehensive introduction to the major groups of terrestrial lifeforms. The series were filmed between 1987 and 2008, but are presented in the order in which the groups evolved, beginning with invertebrates and culminating with human beings, to tell the continuous story of the development of life on land. With a total running time exceeding 34 hours, it represents an in-depth visual survey of the living world as it exists today, at the beginning of the 21st century.

Each series has been remastered to include an on-screen interactive encyclopaedia, which is indexed to provide easy reference to every species filmed, and to behavioural categories such as tool use, symbiosis and migration. The index is cross-referenced in the small hardback book which is also included in the box set. Here, an alphabetical list of species (by common name) and categories is provided along with the disc, episode and chapter number which contains the related footage. No other bonus features are included.

The box set was released on 3 November 2008 in PAL format for DVD Regions 2 and 4. The series are also available individually.

== Life in the Undergrowth (2005) ==
The first series, occupying discs 1 and 2, considers the terrestrial invertebrates, the first group to climb out of the sea and colonise the land. It features molluscs, worms, arthropods and insects. This was one of the later series to be filmed, as Attenborough had to wait until the available camera technology had developed to allow tiny creatures to be filmed without disturbing their behaviour.

=== Episode list ===
1. "Invasion of the Land"
2. "Taking to the Air"
3. "The Silk Spinners"
4. "Intimate Relations"
5. "Supersocieties"

== The Private Life of Plants (1995) ==
The second major group to develop were the plants. Attenborough's 1995 series, which is found on discs 3 and 4, featured groundbreaking timelapse photography which showed the lives of plants to be just as dynamic and dramatic as animals. Land plants evolved alongside the early insects, establishing complex interdependencies which eventually led to the emergence of flowering plants.

=== Episode list ===
1. "Travelling"
2. "Growing"
3. "Flowering"
4. "The Social Struggle"
5. "Living Together"
6. "Surviving"

== Life in Cold Blood (2008) ==
The third series in the collection features the first groups of backboned animals to leave the water, the amphibians, and their descendants, the reptiles. Discs 5 and 6 reveal how these creatures managed to survive in their new environments, and how the ability to regulate their body temperatures has enabled them to colonise even the hottest and driest deserts.

=== Episode list ===
1. "The Cold-Blooded Truth"
2. "Land Invaders"
3. "Dragons of the Dry"
4. "Sophisticated Serpents"
5. "Armoured Giants"

== The Life of Birds (1998) ==
Attenborough's detailed study of birds occupies discs 7 to 9. Descended from reptiles which took to life in the trees and then developed a covering of feathers, birds were able to colonise another new environment, the air. Here, Attenborough reveals not only a multitude of species from around the world, but also previously unfilmed behaviour and intimate moments from every stage of their lives.

=== Episode list ===
1. "To Fly or Not to Fly"
2. "The Mastery of Flight"
3. "The Insatiable Appetite"
4. "Meat Eaters"
5. "Fishing for a Living"
6. "Signals and Songs"
7. "Finding Partners"
8. "The Demands of the Egg"
9. "The Problems of Parenthood"
10. "The Limits of Endurance"

== The Life of Mammals (2002) ==
The fifth series in the set, spread across discs 10 to 13, surveys the mammals. They too are descended from reptiles, but kept themselves warm with a coating of fur, not feathers. As they began to specialise in different food sources, their bodies responded by adapting in ways that enabled them to exploit their chosen diet better, whether that be grazing or hunting.

=== Episode list ===
1. "A Winning Design"
2. "Insect Hunters"
3. "Plant Predators"
4. "Chisellers"
5. "Meat Eaters"
6. "Opportunists"
7. "Return to Water"
8. "Life in the Trees"
9. "Social Climbers"
10. "Food for Thought"

== The First Eden: The Mediterranean World and Man (1987) ==
The sixth and final series was the first to be filmed. Attenborough tells the story of how one species of mammal, Homo sapiens spread from Africa to the Mediterranean and began to change its relationship with the rest of the natural world. Discs 14 and 15 reveal the impacts of our ancestors on Mediterranean flora and fauna.

=== Episode list ===
1. "The Making of the Garden"
2. "The Gods Enslaved"
3. "The Wastes of War"
4. "Strangers in the Garden"
