= David Attenborough =

English broadcaster and natural historian (born 1926)

Sir David Attenborough OM GCMG CH CVO CBE FRS FSA FRSA FLS FZS FRSGS FRSB
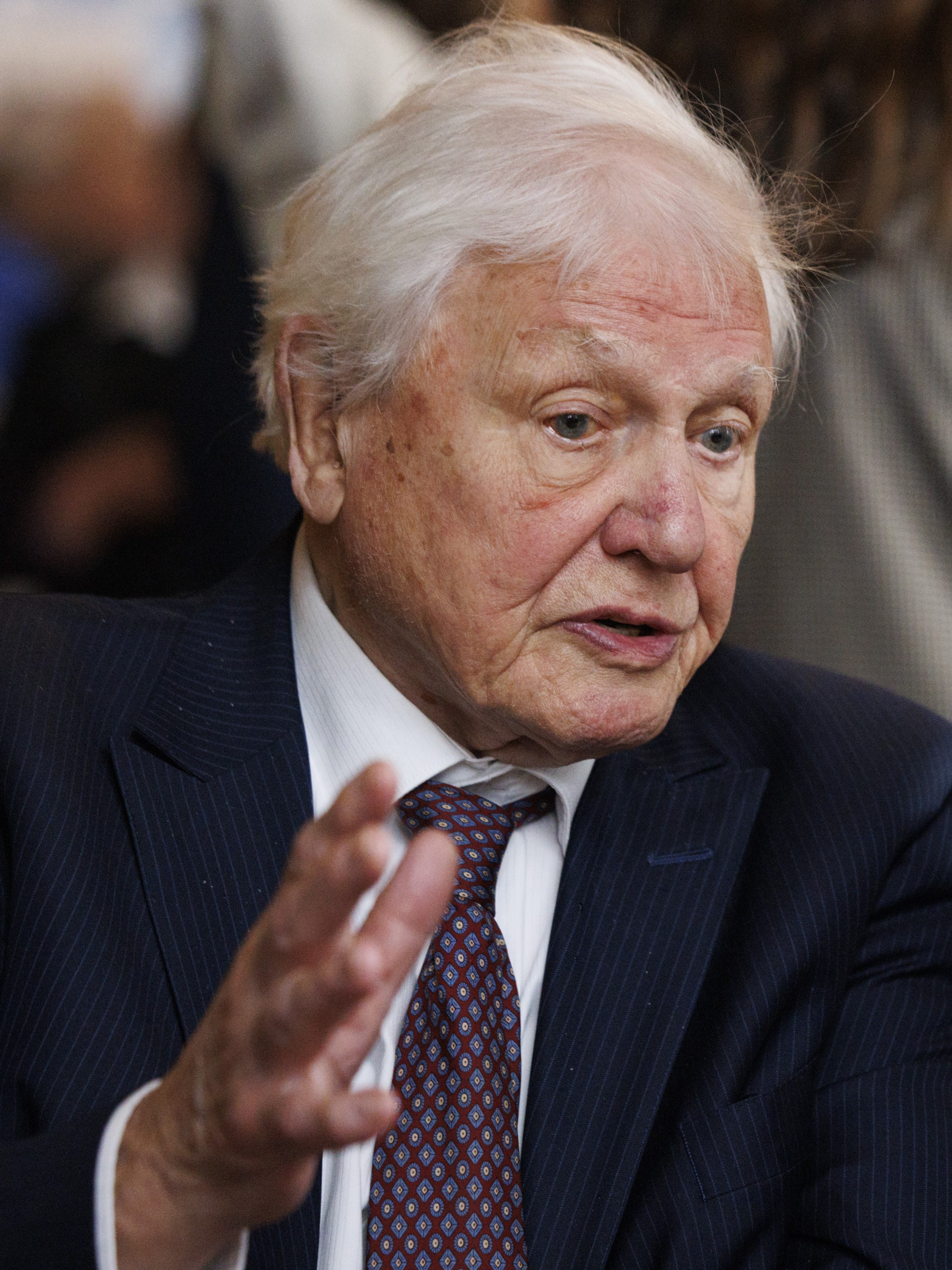
- Attenborough in 2025
- Born: David Frederick Attenborough; 8 May 1926 (age 100); Isleworth, Middlesex, England
- Education: Clare College, Cambridge (MA)
- Occupations: Broadcaster; naturalist; conservationist; writer
- Years active: 1951–present
- Title: Controller of BBC2 (1965–1969); President of the Royal Society for Nature Conservation (1991–1996)
- Spouse: Jane Ebsworth Oriel (m. 1950; died 1997)
- Children: 2
- Parents: Frederick Attenborough (father); Mary Clegg (mother)
- Relatives: Richard Attenborough (brother); John Attenborough (brother); Sheila Sim (sister-in-law); Michael Attenborough (nephew); Jane Attenborough (niece); Charlotte Attenborough (niece); Tom Attenborough (great-nephew); Will Attenborough (great-nephew)
- Awards: Cherry Kearton Medal and Award (1972); Kalinga Prize (1981); Knight Bachelor (1985); Kew International Medal (1996); International Cosmos Prize (2000); RSPB Medal (2000); Michael Faraday Prize (2003); José Vasconcelos World Award of Education (2004); Descartes Prize (2004); Nierenberg Prize (2005); Prince of Asturias Award (2009); Fonseca Prize (2010); Stephen Hawking Medal for Science Communication (2024)
- David Attenborough's voice from the BBC Radio 4 programme Desert Island Discs; Published 29 January 2012

Sir David Frederick Attenborough (/ˈætənbərə/ AT-ən-bər-ə; born 8 May 1926) is an English broadcaster, naturalist and writer. His presenting career began as host of Zoo Quest in 1954, and has spanned seven decades; it includes the nine documentary series forming The Life Collection, Natural World, Wildlife on One, the Planet Earth franchise, The Blue Planet and Frozen Planet. He is the only person to have won BAFTA Awards in black-and-white, colour, high-definition, 3D and 4K resolution. Over his life, he has collected dozens of honorary degrees and awards, including three Primetime Emmy Awards for Outstanding Narrator and one Daytime Emmy Award for Outstanding Daytime Personality – Non-Daily.

Attenborough held senior management positions at the BBC, working as controller of BBC Two and director of programming for BBC Television in the 1960s and 1970s. While his earlier work focused primarily on the natural world, his later work has been more vocal in support of environmental causes. He has advocated for restoring planetary biodiversity, limiting population growth, adopting renewable energy, mitigating climate change, reducing meat consumption and setting aside more areas for natural preservation. On his broadcasting and passion for nature, NPR stated that Attenborough "roamed the globe and shared his discoveries and enthusiasms with his patented semi-whisper way of narrating". He is widely considered a national treasure in the UK, though he does not embrace the term.

== Early life and family ==
David Frederick Attenborough was born on 8 May 1926 in Isleworth, Middlesex, and grew up in College House on the campus of University College, Leicester, where his father, Frederick, worked as the principal. He is the middle of three sons; his older brother, Richard, became an actor and director, and his younger brother, John, was an executive at the Italian car manufacturer Alfa Romeo. During the Second World War, through a British volunteer network known as the Refugee Children's Movement, his parents fostered two Jewish refugee girls from Germany.

Attenborough spent his childhood collecting fossils, stones and natural specimens. He received encouragement when a young Jacquetta Hawkes admired his collection. He spent much time in the grounds of the university. Aged around 11, he heard that the zoology department needed a large supply of newts, which he offered through his father for 3d each. The source, which he did not reveal at the time, was a pond adjacent to the department. A year later, his adoptive sister Marianne gave him a piece of amber containing prehistoric creatures; some 60 years later, it would be the focus of "The Amber Time Machine", an episode of his series Natural World.

In 1936, Attenborough and his brother Richard attended a lecture by Grey Owl (Archibald Belaney) at De Montfort Hall in Leicester, where they were influenced by his advocacy of conservation. According to Richard, David was

bowled over by the man's determination to save the beaver, by his profound knowledge of the flora and fauna of the Canadian wilderness and by his warnings of ecological disaster should the delicate balance between them be destroyed. The idea that mankind was endangering nature by recklessly despoiling and plundering its riches was unheard of at the time, but it is one that has remained part of David's own credo to this day.

In 1999, Richard directed a biographical film of Belaney entitled Grey Owl.

Attenborough was educated at Wyggeston Grammar School for Boys in Leicester, now known as Wyggeston and Queen Elizabeth I College. In 1944, his father arranged for him to join University College Nottingham's Geology Department as a part-time student on a Geology Practical course. He won a scholarship to Clare College, Cambridge, in 1945 to study geology and zoology, was a member of the undergraduate Sedgwick Club and obtained a degree in natural sciences. In 1947, he was called up for national service in the Royal Navy and spent two years stationed in North Wales and the Firth of Forth.

== Career ==
=== Early years at the BBC ===
After leaving the navy, Attenborough took a position editing children's science textbooks for a publishing company. He soon became disillusioned with the work and in 1950 applied for a job as a radio talk producer with the BBC. Although he was rejected for this job, his curriculum vitae later attracted the interest of Mary Adams, head of the Talks (factual broadcasting) department of the BBC's fledgling television service. Attenborough, like most Britons at that time, did not own a television and had seen only one programme in his life.

Attenborough accepted Adams's offer of a three-month training course. In 1952, he joined the BBC full-time. Initially discouraged from appearing on camera because Adams thought his teeth were too big, he became a producer for the Talks department, which handled all non-fiction broadcasts. His early projects included the quiz show Animal, Vegetable, Mineral? and Song Hunter, a series about folk music presented by Alan Lomax.

Attenborough's association with natural history programmes began when he produced and presented the three-part series Animal Patterns. The studio-bound programme featured animals from London Zoo, with the naturalist Julian Huxley discussing their use of camouflage, aposematism and courtship displays. Through this programme, Attenborough met Jack Lester, the curator of the zoo's reptile house, and they decided to make a series about an animal-collecting expedition. The result was Zoo Quest, first broadcast in 1954, where Attenborough became the presenter at short notice due to Lester being taken ill.

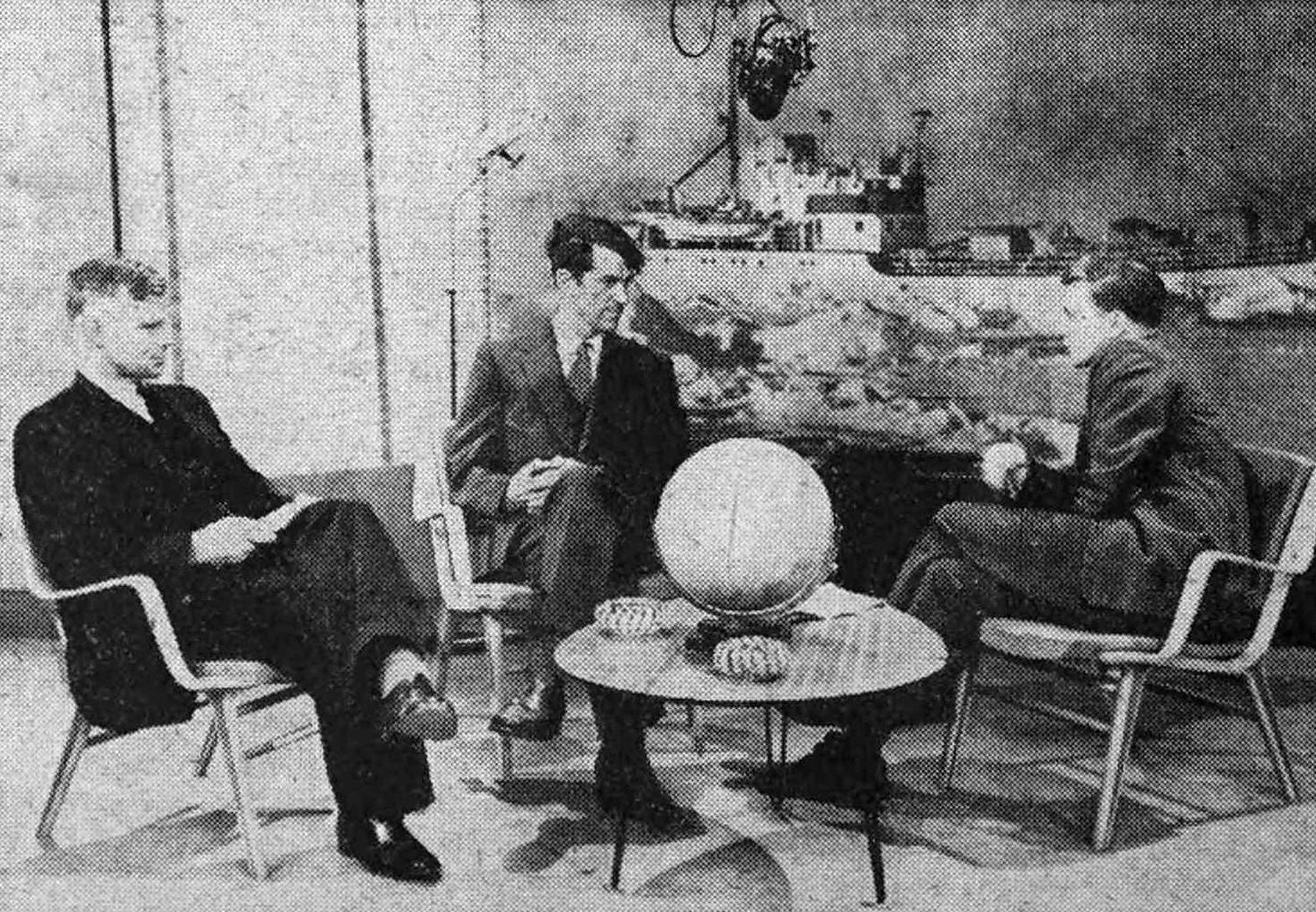
Attenborough (right) interviewing Vivian Fuchs (left) and Edmund Hillary (centre), 1956

In 1957, the BBC Natural History Unit was formally established in Bristol. Attenborough was asked to join it, but declined, not wishing to move from London where he and his young family were settled. Instead, he formed his own department, the Travel and Exploration Unit, which allowed him to continue to front Zoo Quest and produce other documentaries, notably the Travellers' Tales and Adventure series. In the early 1960s, Attenborough resigned from the permanent staff of the BBC to study for a postgraduate degree in social anthropology at the London School of Economics, interweaving his studies with further filming. However, he accepted an invitation to return to the BBC as controller of BBC Two before he could finish the degree.

=== BBC administration ===
Attenborough became Controller of BBC Two in March 1965, succeeding Michael Peacock. He had a clause inserted in his contract that would allow him to continue making programmes on an occasional basis. Later that year he filmed elephants in Tanzania and in 1969 made a three-part series on the cultural history of the Indonesian island of Bali. For the 1971 film A Blank on the Map, he joined the first Western expedition to a remote highland valley in New Guinea to seek out a lost tribe.

BBC Two launched in 1964 but initially struggled to capture the public's imagination. When Attenborough arrived as controller, he quickly abolished the channel's quirky kangaroo mascot and shook up the schedule. With a mission to make BBC Two's output diverse and different from other networks, he began establishing a portfolio of programmes that defined the channel's identity for decades to come. Under his tenure, music, the arts, entertainment, archaeology, experimental comedy, travel, drama, sport, business, science and natural history all found a place in the weekly schedules. Often, an eclectic mix was offered within a single evening's viewing. Programmes he commissioned included Man Alive, Call My Bluff, Chronicle, The Old Grey Whistle Test, Monty Python's Flying Circus and The Money Programme. With the advent of colour television, Attenborough brought snooker to the BBC to show the benefits of the format, as the sport uses coloured balls. The show – Pot Black – was later credited with the boom of the sport into the 1980s. In 1986, Attenborough influenced the creation of the yellow tennis ball by stating that the white tennis balls previously used could not be seen on colour television.

One of his most significant decisions was to order a 13-part series on the history of Western art, to show off the quality of the new UHF colour television service that BBC Two offered. Broadcast to universal acclaim in 1969, Civilisation, presented by Sir Kenneth Clark, became the blueprint for landmark authored documentaries, which were informally known as "sledgehammer" projects. Others followed, including Jacob Bronowski's The Ascent of Man (also commissioned by Attenborough) and Alistair Cooke's America: A Personal History of the United States. Attenborough thought that the story of evolution would be a natural subject for such a series. He shared his idea with Christopher Parsons, a producer at the Natural History Unit, who came up with the title Life on Earth and returned to Bristol to start planning the series. Attenborough harboured a strong desire to present the series himself, but this would not be possible as long as he remained in a management post.

While in charge of BBC Two, Attenborough turned down Terry Wogan's application to present on the channel, stating that there were no suitable vacancies. The channel already had an Irish announcer, with Attenborough reflecting in 2016: "To have had two Irishmen presenting on BBC Two would have looked ridiculous. This is no comment whatsoever on Terry Wogan's talents." Attenborough has also acknowledged that he authorised the wiping of television output during this period to cut costs, including a series by Alan Bennett, which he later regretted.

In 1969, Attenborough was promoted to director of programmes, making him responsible for the output of both BBC channels. His tasks, which included agreeing budgets, attending board meetings and firing staff, were now far removed from the business of filming programmes. When Attenborough's name was suggested as a candidate for Director-General of the BBC in 1972, he phoned his brother Richard to confess that he had no appetite for the job. Early the following year, he left his post to return to full-time programme-making, leaving him free to write and present the planned natural history epic.

After his resignation, Attenborough became a freelance broadcaster and started work on his next project, a trip to Indonesia with a crew from the Natural History Unit. It resulted in the 1973 series Eastwards with Attenborough, which was similar in tone to the earlier Zoo Quest; the main difference was the introduction of colour. Attenborough stated that he wanted to work in Asia, because previous nature documentaries had mostly focused on Africa. That year, Attenborough was invited to deliver the Royal Institution Christmas Lecture on The Language of Animals. After his work on Eastwards with Attenborough, he began to work on the scripts for Life on Earth.

Due to the scale of his ambition, the BBC decided to partner with an American network to secure the necessary funding. While negotiations were underway, Attenborough worked on several other television projects. He presented a series on tribal art (The Tribal Eye, 1975) and another on the voyages of discovery (The Explorers, 1975). He presented a BBC children's series about cryptozoology entitled Fabulous Animals (1975), which featured mythical creatures such as mermaids and unicorns. Eventually, the BBC signed a co-production deal with Turner Broadcasting and Life on Earth moved into production in 1976. In 1979, he visited the People's Republic of China and reported to the West for the first time about the Chinese one-child policy. Attenborough appeared in 14 episodes of the game show Face the Music, from 1975 to 1983.

=== Life series ===
Beginning with Life on Earth in 1979, Attenborough set about creating a body of work which became a benchmark of quality in wildlife film-making and influenced a generation of documentary film-makers. The series established many of the hallmarks of the BBC's natural history output. By treating his subject seriously and researching the latest discoveries, Attenborough and his production team gained the trust of scientists, who responded by allowing him to feature their subjects in his programmes.

Innovation was another factor in Life on Earth's success: new film-making techniques were devised to capture the shots Attenborough wanted, focusing on events and animals that had previously gone unfilmed. International air travel enabled the series to be devised so that Attenborough visited several locations around the globe in each episode, sometimes even changing continents in one sequence. Although appearing as the on-screen presenter, he limited his time on camera to give his subjects more screen time.

Five years after the success of Life on Earth, the BBC released The Living Planet. This time, Attenborough built his series around the theme of ecology, the adaptations of living things to their environment. It was another critical and commercial success, generating huge international sales for the BBC. In 1990, The Trials of Life completed the original Life trilogy, looking at animal behaviour across the different stages of life.

In the 1990s, Attenborough continued to use the "Life" title for a succession of authored documentaries. In 1993, he presented Life in the Freezer, the first television series to survey the natural history of Antarctica. Although past normal retirement age, he then embarked on a number of more specialised surveys of the natural world, beginning with plants. They proved a difficult subject for his producers, who had to deliver hours of television featuring what are essentially immobile objects. The result was The Private Life of Plants (1995), which showed plants as dynamic organisms by using time-lapse photography to speed up their growth, and went on to earn a Peabody Award.

Prompted by an enthusiastic ornithologist at the BBC Natural History Unit, Attenborough then turned his attention to birds. As he was neither a birdwatcher nor a bird expert, he decided he was better qualified to make The Life of Birds (1998) on the theme of behaviour. The documentary series won a second Peabody Award the following year. The order of the remaining "Life" series was dictated by developments in camera technology. For The Life of Mammals (2002), low-light and infrared cameras were deployed to reveal the behaviour of nocturnal mammals. The series contains a number of memorable two shots of Attenborough and his subjects, including chimpanzees, a blue whale and a grizzly bear. Advances in macro photography made it possible to capture the natural behaviour of very small creatures for the first time, and in 2005, Life in the Undergrowth introduced audiences to the world of invertebrates.

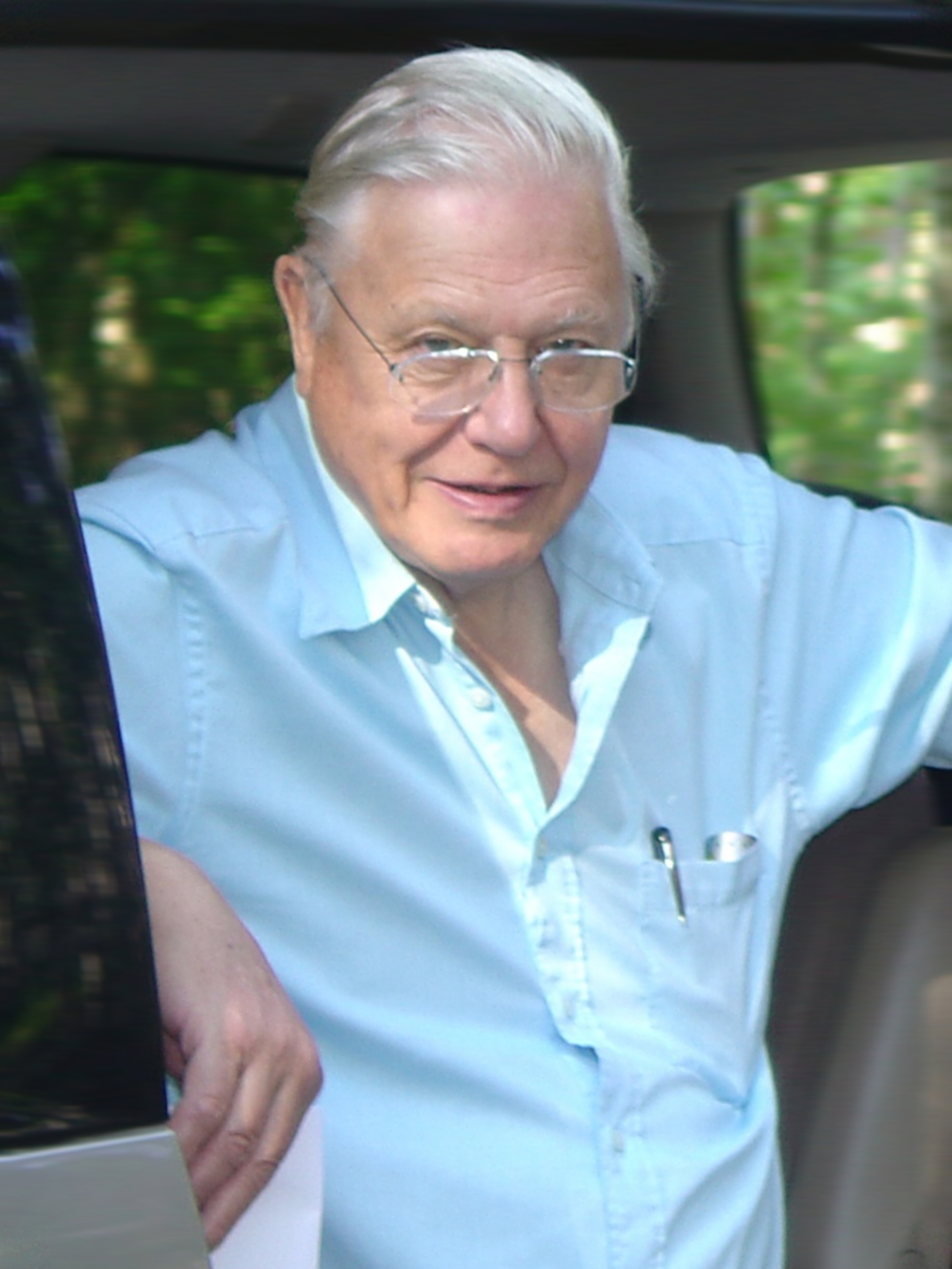
Attenborough in the Ouachita Mountains whilst filming Life in Cold Blood, July 2005

At this point, Attenborough realised that he had spent 20 years unconsciously assembling a collection of programmes on all the major groups of terrestrial animals and plants – only reptiles and amphibians were missing. When Life in Cold Blood was broadcast in 2008, he had the satisfaction of completing the set, brought together in a DVD encyclopaedia called Life on Land. He commented: "The evolutionary history is finished. The endeavour is complete. If you'd asked me 20 years ago whether we'd be attempting such a mammoth task, I'd have said 'Don't be ridiculous!' These programmes tell a particular story and I'm sure others will come along and tell it much better than I did, but I do hope that if people watch it in 50 years' time, it will still have something to say about the world we live in."

However, in 2010 Attenborough asserted that his First Life – dealing with evolutionary history before Life on Earth – should be included within the "Life" series. In the documentary Attenborough's Journey, he stated, "This series, to a degree which I really didn't fully appreciate until I started working on it, really completes the set."

=== Beyond Life on Earth ===
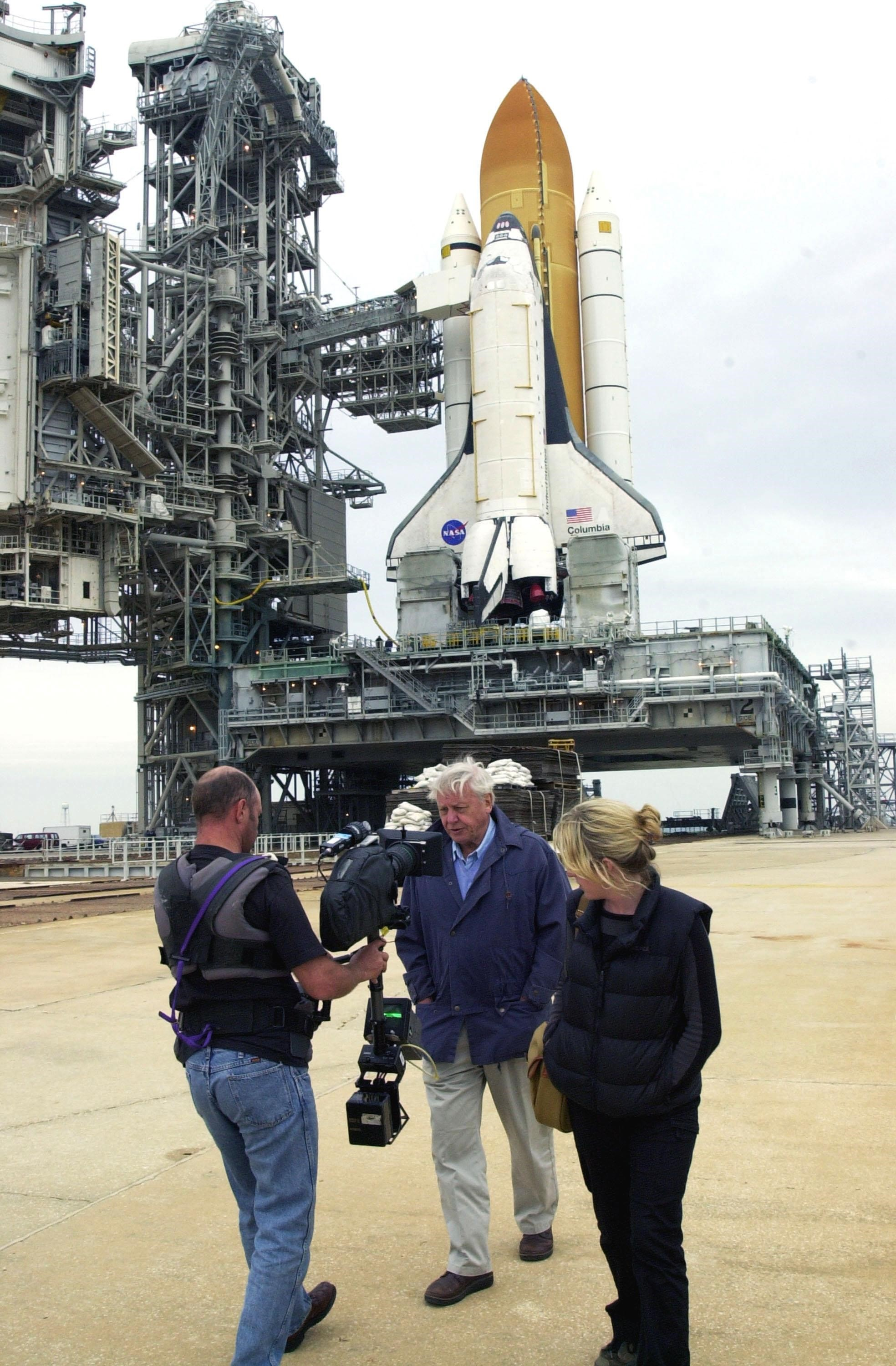
Attenborough filming commentary for a documentary at the Kennedy Space Center in Florida, United States, with Space Shuttle Columbia in the background

Alongside the Life series, Attenborough continued to work on other television documentaries, mainly in the natural history genre. He wrote and presented a series on man's influence on the natural history of the Mediterranean basin, The First Eden, in 1987. Two years later, he demonstrated his passion for fossils in Lost Worlds, Vanished Lives. In 1990, he worked on the BBC's Prisoners of Conscience series where he highlighted the case of the Sudanese poet Mahjoub Sharif.

Attenborough narrated every episode of Wildlife on One, a BBC One wildlife series that ran for 253 episodes between 1977 and 2005. At its peak, it drew a weekly audience of eight to ten million, while the 1987 episode "Meerkats United" was voted the best wildlife documentary of all time by BBC viewers. He has narrated over 50 episodes of Natural World, BBC Two's flagship wildlife series. Its forerunner, The World About Us, was created by Attenborough in 1969, as a vehicle for colour television. In 1997, he narrated the BBC Wildlife Specials, each focusing on a charismatic species and screened to mark the Natural History Unit's 40th anniversary.

As a writer and narrator, Attenborough continued to collaborate with the BBC Natural History Unit in the new millennium. Alastair Fothergill, a senior producer with whom Attenborough had worked on The Trials of Life and Life in the Freezer, was making The Blue Planet (2001), the Unit's first comprehensive series on marine life. He decided not to use an on-screen presenter due to difficulties in speaking to a camera through diving apparatus, but asked Attenborough to narrate the films. The same team reunited for Planet Earth (2006), the biggest nature documentary ever made for television and the first BBC wildlife series to be shot in high definition.

In 2009, Attenborough co-wrote and narrated Life, a ten-part series focusing on extraordinary animal behaviour, and narrated Nature's Great Events, which showed how seasonal changes trigger major natural spectacles. In January 2009 the BBC commissioned Attenborough to provide a series of 20 ten-minute monologues covering the history of nature. Entitled David Attenborough's Life Stories, they were broadcast on Radio 4 on Friday nights.

In 2011, Fothergill gave Attenborough a more prominent role in Frozen Planet, a major series on the natural history of the polar regions; Attenborough appeared on screen, authored the final episode, and performed voiceover duties. Attenborough introduced and narrated the Unit's first 4K production, Life Story. For Planet Earth II (2016), Attenborough returned as narrator and presenter, with Hans Zimmer composing the main theme music.

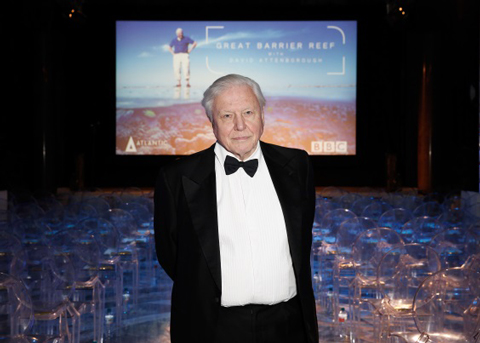
Attenborough at a screening of Great Barrier Reef, 2015

In October 2014, the corporation announced a trio of new one-off Attenborough documentaries as part of a raft of new natural history programmes. BBC Two aired "Attenborough's Paradise Birds" and "Attenborough's Big Birds", while BBC One broadcast "Waking Giants", which follows the discovery of giant dinosaur bones in South America, aired on BBC One. The BBC commissioned Atlantic Productions in 2015 to develop a three-part, Attenborough-fronted series, Great Barrier Reef. This was their tenth collaboration and marked his return to a location he first filmed in 1957.

On radio, Attenborough has continued as a presenter of BBC Radio 4's Tweet of the Day, which began a second series in September 2014. Attenborough forged a partnership with Sky, working on documentaries for the broadcaster's new 3D network, Sky 3D. Their first collaboration was Flying Monsters 3D, a film about pterosaurs which debuted on Christmas Day in 2010. A second film, The Penguin King 3D, followed a year later. His next 3D project, Conquest of the Skies, made by the team behind the BAFTA award-winning David Attenborough's Natural History Museum Alive, aired on Sky 3D during Christmas 2014.

Attenborough has narrated three series of David Attenborough's Natural Curiosities for the UKTV channel Watch, with the third series showing in 2015. He has also narrated A majestic celebration: Wild Karnataka, India's first blue-chip natural history film, directed by Kalyan Varma and Amoghavarsha. Blue Planet II was broadcast in 2017, with Attenborough returning as presenter. The series was critically acclaimed and reached the highest UK viewing figure of 2017, at 14.1 million. The series is thought to have triggered a long-lasting increase in public, media and political attention to plastic pollution. Attenborough narrated the 2018 five-part series Dynasties, with each episode focusing on one species. In 2021, he presented the three-part series Attenborough's Life in Colour, and The Mating Game, a five-part series.

Attenborough returned to prehistoric life with Dinosaurs: The Final Day and Prehistoric Planet, aired in April and May 2022. In 2025, Attenborough presented Wild London on the city's wildlife.

=== Environmentalist advocacy ===
Attenborough speaking at the 2021 United Nations Climate Change Conference

By the turn of the millennium, Attenborough's authored documentaries were adopting a more overtly environmentalist stance. In State of the Planet (2000), he used the latest scientific evidence and interviews with leading scientists and conservationists to assess the impact of human activities on the natural world. He later turned to the issues of global warming (The Truth about Climate Change, 2006) and human population growth (How Many People Can Live on Planet Earth?, 2009). He contributed a programme which highlighted the plight of endangered species to the BBC's Saving Planet Earth project in 2007, the 50th anniversary of the Natural History Unit.

In 2019, Attenborough narrated Our Planet, an eight-part documentary series, for Netflix. In contrast to much of his prior work for the BBC, this series emphasised the destructive role of human activities. Before, he often noted concerns in a final section of the work. Attenborough's one-off film documentary about climate change for BBC One, Climate Change – The Facts, aired in 2019; its tone was significantly graver than in his previous work for the BBC. This was followed by Extinction: The Facts, which is partly based on the 2019 IPBES report on the decline of biodiversity.

In 2020, Attenborough narrated the documentary film David Attenborough: A Life on Our Planet. The film acts as Attenborough's witness statement, reflecting on his career as a naturalist and his hopes for the future. It was released on Netflix on 4 October 2020. Further work for Netflix includes the documentary titled Breaking Boundaries: The Science of Our Planet, released on 4 June 2021. In October 2020, Attenborough began filming The Green Planet in Cambridge. In 2021, he narrated A Perfect Planet, a five-part earth science series for BBC One.

Attenborough was a key figure in the build-up to the 2021 United Nations Climate Change Conference (COP26) and spoke at the opening ceremony. In it he stated that humans were "the greatest problem solvers to have ever existed on Earth" and spoke of his optimism for the future, finishing by saying "In my lifetime I've witnessed a terrible decline. In yours, you could and should witness a wonderful recovery."

In 2022, the United Nations Environment Programme recognised Attenborough as a Champion of the Earth "for his dedication to research, documentation, and advocacy for the protection of nature and its restoration".

== Views and advocacy ==
=== Environment ===
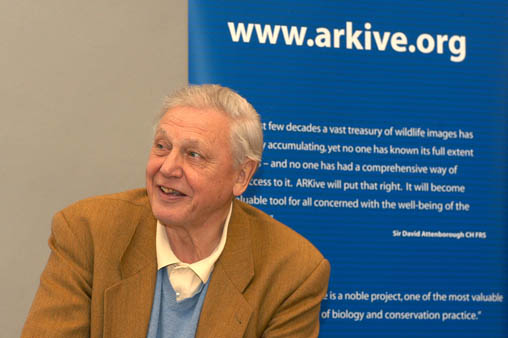
Attenborough in 2003 at the launch of ARKive – a global initiative with the mission of "promoting the conservation of the world's threatened species, through the power of wildlife imagery"

Attenborough's programmes have often included references to the impact of human society on the natural world. The last episode of The Living Planet, for example, focuses almost entirely on humans' destruction of the environment and ways that it could be stopped or reversed. Despite this, he has been criticised for not giving enough prominence to environmental messages. In 2018, while promoting Dynasties, he said that repeated messages on threats to wildlife in programming could be a "turn-off" to viewers.

Some environmentalists feel that programmes like Attenborough's give a false picture of idyllic wilderness and do not do enough to acknowledge that such areas are increasingly encroached upon by humans. However, the increased urgency of environmental messaging in films such as Extinction: The Facts, which depicts the continuing sixth mass extinction, Climate Change – The Facts and A Life on Our Planet from 2019 and 2020 received praise. In Seven Worlds, One Planet, Attenborough discusses the devastating impact that deforestation is having on the planet and the species.

In 2005 and 2006, Attenborough backed a BirdLife International project to stop the killing of albatross by longline fishing boats. He gave support to WWF's campaign to have 220,000 square kilometres (85,000 square miles) of Borneo's rainforest designated a protected area. He serves as a vice-president of The Conservation Volunteers, vice-president of Fauna and Flora International, president of Butterfly Conservation and president emeritus of Leicestershire and Rutland Wildlife Trust.

In 2003, Attenborough launched an appeal on behalf of the World Land Trust to create a rainforest reserve in Ecuador in memory of Christopher Parsons, the producer of Life on Earth and a personal friend, who had died the previous year. The same year, he helped to launch ARKive, a global project instigated by Parsons to gather together natural history media into a digital library. ARKive is an initiative of Wildscreen, of which Attenborough is a patron. He later became patron of the World Land Trust. In 2020, he backed a Fauna and Flora International campaign calling for a global moratorium on deep sea mining for its impact on marine life.

Attenborough and US president Barack Obama discuss the natural world at the White House (2015).

During the COVID-19 pandemic, Attenborough advocated on behalf of the Zoological Society of London (ZSL) and its conservation efforts, which had been impacted by the economic fallout from the pandemic. In 2020 he was named as a member of the Earthshot Prize Council, an initiative of Prince William to find solutions to environmental issues. He is a patron of the Friends of Richmond Park and serves on the advisory board of BBC Wildlife magazine.

Attenborough was initially sceptical about the human influence on climate change and stated that a 2004 lecture finally convinced him humans were responsible. He remained silent on the issue until 2006. Attenborough attended and spoke at COP26 as the "People's Advocate" for the event and urged world leaders to act to reduce emissions. He supported Glyndebourne in their successful application to obtain planning permission for a wind turbine in an Area of Outstanding Natural Beauty and gave evidence at the planning inquiry arguing in favour of the proposal. In his 2020 documentary film David Attenborough: A Life On Our Planet, Attenborough advocates for people to adopt a vegetarian diet or to reduce meat consumption to save wildlife, noting that "the planet can't support billions of meat-eaters."

Prince Harry, Duke of Sussex, for Time magazine, summed up his life this way: "He has earned the world’s trust by simply showing us that our environment is worth appreciating. He didn’t demand our attention, but drew us in with the wonder of nature all the same."

=== Human population ===
Attenborough has linked anthropogenic effects on the environment with human population growth. He has attracted criticism for his views on human overpopulation and human population control. He is a patron of Population Matters, a UK charity advocating for family planning, sustainable consumption and proposed sustainable human population. In a 2013 interview with the Radio Times, Attenborough described humans as a "plague on the Earth", and described the act of sending food to famine-stricken countries as "barmy" for population reasons. He called for more debate about human population growth, saying that since he "first started making programmes 60 years ago, the human population has tripled."

According to Attenborough, improving women's rights around the world is an effective way "to limit our birth rate". He said that "anyone who thinks that you can have infinite growth in a finite environment is either a madman or an economist."

=== Views on evolution and creationism ===
Attenborough considers himself an agnostic. When asked whether his observation of the natural world has given him faith in a creator, he generally responds with some version of this story, making reference to the parasitic worm Onchocerca volvulus:

My response is that when Creationists talk about God creating every individual species as a separate act, they always instance hummingbirds, or orchids, sunflowers and beautiful things. But I tend to think instead of a parasitic worm that is boring through the eye of a boy sitting on the bank of a river in West Africa, [a worm] that's going to make him blind. And [I ask them], "Are you telling me that the God you believe in, who you also say is an all-merciful God, who cares for each one of us individually, are you saying that God created this worm that can live in no other way than in an innocent child's eyeball? Because that doesn't seem to me to coincide with a God who's full of mercy."

He has explained that he feels the evidence all over the planet clearly shows evolution to be the best way to explain the diversity of life and that "as far as [he's] concerned, if there is a supreme being then he chose organic evolution as a way of bringing into existence the natural world". In a BBC Four interview with Mark Lawson, he was asked if he at any time had any religious faith. He replied simply, "no". He said "It never really occurred to me to believe in God".

In 2002, Attenborough joined an effort by leading clerics and scientists to oppose the inclusion of creationism in the curriculum of UK state-funded independent schools which receive private sponsorship, such as the Emmanuel Schools Foundation. In 2009, he stated that the Book of Genesis, by saying that the world was there for people to control, had taught generations that they can "dominate" the environment and that this has resulted in the devastation of vast areas of it. He further explained to the science journal Nature, "That's why Darwinism, and the fact of evolution, is of great importance, because it is that attitude which has led to the devastation of so much, and we are in the situation that we are in".

Also in early 2009, the BBC broadcast an Attenborough one-hour special, Charles Darwin and the Tree of Life. In reference to the programme, Attenborough stated that "People write to me that evolution is only a theory. Well, it is not a theory. Evolution is as solid a historical fact as you could conceive. Evidence from every quarter. What is a theory is whether natural selection is the mechanism and the only mechanism. That is a theory. But the historical reality that dinosaurs led to birds and mammals produced whales, that's not theory." He strongly opposes creationism and its offshoot "intelligent design", saying that the results of a survey that found a quarter of science teachers in state schools believe that creationism should be taught alongside evolution in science lessons was "really terrible".

In March 2009, Attenborough appeared on Friday Night with Jonathan Ross. Attenborough stated that he felt evolution did not rule out the existence of a God and accepted the title of agnostic, saying, "My view is: I don't know one way or the other but I don't think that evolution is against a belief in God".

Attenborough has joined the evolutionary biologist Richard Dawkins and other top scientists in signing a campaign statement co-ordinated by the British Humanist Association (BHA). The statement calls for "creationism to be banned from the school science curriculum and for evolution to be taught more widely in schools".

=== BBC and public service broadcasting ===
Attenborough is a lifelong supporter of the BBC, public service broadcasting and the television licence. He has said that public service broadcasting "is one of the things that distinguishes this country and makes me want to live here", and believes that it is not reducible to individual programmes, but "can only effectively operate as a network [...] that measures its success not only by its audience size but by the range of its schedule".

... the BBC per minute in almost every category is as cheap as you can find anywhere in the world and produces the best quality. [...] The BBC has gone through swingeing staff cuts. It has been cut to the bone, if you divert licence fee money elsewhere, you cut quality and services. [...] There is a lot of people who want to see the BBC weakened. They talk of this terrible tax of the licence fee. Yet it is the best bargain that is going. Four radio channels and god knows how many TV channels. It is piffling.

Attenborough expressed the view that people had often wanted to remove the BBC, adding "there's always been trouble about the licence and if you dropped your guard you could bet our bottom dollar there'd be plenty of people who'd want to take it away. The licence fee is the basis on which the BBC is based and if you destroy it, broadcasting... becomes a wasteland." He expressed regret at some of the changes made to the BBC in the 1990s by its director-general, John Birt, who introduced an internal market at the corporation, slimmed and closed some departments and outsourced much of the corporation's output to private production companies.

Although he said Birt's policies had poor results, Attenborough also acknowledged "the BBC had to change". In 2008, he criticised the BBC's television schedules, positing that the two senior networks, BBC One and BBC Two – which Attenborough stated were "first set up as a partnership" – now "schedule simultaneously programmes of identical character, thereby contradicting the very reason that the BBC was given a second network."

=== Politics ===
In 1998, Attenborough described himself as "a standard, boring left-wing liberal" and expressed the view that the market economy was "misery". In 2013, Attenborough joined the rock guitarists Brian May and Slash in opposing the British government's policy on the cull of badgers in the UK by participating in a song dedicated to badgers. Attenborough was one of 200 public figures who were signatories to a letter to The Guardian expressing their hope that Scotland would vote to remain part of the United Kingdom in the 2014 referendum on that issue. Prior to the 2015 general election, Attenborough was one of several celebrities who endorsed the parliamentary candidacy of the Green Party's Caroline Lucas.

In an interview in 2020, Attenborough criticised excess capitalism as a driver of ecological imbalance, stating that "the excesses the capitalist system has brought us, have got to be curbed somehow" and that "greed does not actually lead to joy", although he added, "That doesn't mean to say that capitalism is dead." He also lamented the lack of international cooperation on climate change: "There should be no dominant nation on this planet." In 2021, Attenborough told the leaders of the 47th G7 summit that "tackling climate change was now as much a political challenge as it was a scientific or technological one" and urged for more action. Attenborough also stated that "(we) are on the verge of destabilising the entire planet."

In 2023, Attenborough was described by the New Statesman as a figure "invaluable to green diplomacy" in the UK, placing him twenty-third in their list of Britain's most powerful left-wing figures, above many elected politicians.

=== Artificial intelligence ===
Attenborough has criticised the use of AI to clone his voice for narration, stating that "having spent a lifetime trying to speak what I believe to be the truth, I am profoundly disturbed to find that these days, my identity is being stolen by others and greatly object to them using it to say whatever they wish."

== Personal life ==
=== Family ===
In 1950, Attenborough married Jane Elizabeth Ebsworth Oriel. She died in 1997.

Attenborough and his wife had two children, Robert and Susan. Robert is a senior lecturer in bioanthropology for the Department of Archaeology at the University of Cambridge. He holds an honorary affiliation with the Australian National University in Canberra. Susan is a former primary school headmistress. Attenborough himself lives in South West London, near Richmond Park.

=== Religion ===
Attenborough is agnostic. His parents did not instil any religious beliefs during his childhood, Attenborough stating "It never really occurred to me to believe in God." He has also stated he "lacks confidence" to identify as atheist and does not think the theory of evolution necessarily precludes the existence of a deity.

In 2002, he was one of various scientists along with clergy to publicly oppose including creationism in the curriculums of government-funded, privately sponsored independent schools like the Emmanuel Schools Foundation.

=== Health and longevity ===
Attenborough had a pacemaker fitted in June 2013, as well as a double knee replacement in 2015. In September 2013, on the prospect of retirement, he commented: "If I was earning my money by hewing coal I would be very glad indeed to stop. But I'm not. I'm swanning round the world looking at the most fabulously interesting things. Such good fortune."

==== 100th birthday ====
External videos
- Prince William's Speech for Sir David Attenborough's 100th Birthday at The Royal Albert Hall on YouTube

Attenborough turned 100 on 8 May 2026, and his birthday was celebrated by notable individuals and organisations around the world, including a birthday card from King Charles III. The event was marked by a gala concert at the Royal Albert Hall, which Attenborough attended alongside William, Prince of Wales, who wished him a happy birthday. Other attendees included Kirsty Young, Chris Packham, Sir Michael Palin, members of the band Sigur Rós, Olivia Colman, Dame Judi Dench, and Emily Eavis. The audience sang "Happy Birthday to You" to Attenborough. The Albert Hall celebration was broadcast as a 90 minute BBC One programme, David Attenborough's 100 Years on Planet Earth.

Tributes were made by Hans Zimmer, Phoebe Waller-Bridge, Camila Cabello, among others. One tribute featured Paddington Bear. The composers Brian Eno, Pete Townshend and Pete M. Wyer organised a virtual birthday concert for Attenborough. The Attenborough Nature Reserve plans on celebrating the birthday for three days. The BBC announced that Attenborough would narrate Blue Planet III. The parasitic wasp genus Attenboroughnculus was named after him to mark his birthday. Lego updated their age range of 4–99 to 4–100+.

== Achievements, awards and recognition ==
He roamed the globe and shared his discoveries and enthusiasms with his patented semi-whisper way of narrating. He talks like he's revealing secrets and draws you in using such simple language that he's instantly understood, making his sense of wonder infectious. And when he goes on site to share the screen with one of his subjects, it's magical.

— NPR review of Attenborough's Journey' Salutes The Broadcaster With A Passion For Nature.

Attenborough's contribution to broadcasting and wildlife film-making has brought him international recognition. He has been called "the great communicator, the peerless educator" and "the greatest broadcaster of our time." His programmes are often cited as an example of what public service broadcasting should be, even by critics of the BBC, and have influenced a generation of wildlife film-makers.

In 2024, Attenborough received the Stephen Hawking Medal for Science Communication from the Starmus Festival as a Special Lifetime Achievement recipient, recognising his contributions to public science communication through natural-history broadcasting. The medal was presented at Starmus VII in Bratislava, Slovakia, and was accepted on his behalf by Starmus co-founder Brian May.

=== Honorary titles ===
By January 2013, Attenborough had collected 32 honorary degrees from British universities, more than any other person. In 1980, he was honoured by The Open University, with which he has had a close association throughout his career. He has honorary Doctor of Science degrees from Durham University (1982) and the University of Cambridge (1984) and honorary Doctor of Philosophy degrees from the University of Oxford (1988) and Ghent University (1997).

In 2006, the two eldest Attenborough brothers returned to their home city to receive the title of Distinguished Honorary Fellows of the University of Leicester, "in recognition of a record of continuing distinguished service to the University." David Attenborough was previously awarded an honorary Doctor of Letters degree by the university in 1970 and was made an honorary Freeman of the City of Leicester in 1990. In 2013, he was made an Honorary Freeman of the City of Bristol. In 2010, he was awarded Honorary Doctorates from Nelson Mandela Metropolitan University and Nottingham Trent University.

Attenborough has received the title Honorary Fellow from Clare College, Cambridge (1980), the Zoological Society of London (1998), the Linnean Society (1999), the Institute of Biology (Now the Royal Society of Biology) (2000), and the Society of Antiquaries (2007). He is Honorary Patron of the North American Native Plant Society, a Patron of the Museum of Richmond and was elected as a Corresponding Member of the Australian Academy of Science. He was awarded an Honorary Degree from Bangor University in 2009 to celebrate their 125th anniversary.

=== Recognition ===
Attenborough has been featured as the subject of a number of BBC television programmes. Life on Air (2002) examined the legacy of his work and Attenborough the Controller (2002) focused on his time in charge of BBC Two. He was also featured prominently in The Way We Went Wild (2004), a series about natural history television presenters, and 100 Years of Wildlife Films (2007), a programme marking the centenary of the nature documentary. In 2006, British television viewers were asked to vote for their Favourite Attenborough Moments for a UKTV poll to coincide with the broadcaster's 80th birthday. The winning clip showed Attenborough observing the mimicry skills of the superb lyrebird.

Attenborough was named the most trusted celebrity in the UK in a 2006 Reader's Digest poll, and in 2007 he won The Culture Show's Living Icon Award. He has been named among the 100 Greatest Britons in a 2002 BBC poll and is one of the top ten "Heroes of Our Time" according to New Statesman magazine. In September 2009 the Natural History Museum, London, opened the Attenborough Studio, part of its Darwin Centre development.

In 2012, Attenborough was among the British cultural icons selected by artist Sir Peter Blake to appear in a new version of his most famous artwork – the Beatles' Sgt. Pepper's Lonely Hearts Club Band album cover – to celebrate the British cultural figures of his life. The same year, Attenborough featured in the BBC Radio 4 series The New Elizabethans to mark the Diamond Jubilee of Queen Elizabeth II. A panel of seven academics, journalists and historians named him among the group of people in the UK "whose actions during the reign of Elizabeth II have had a significant impact on lives in these islands".

A British polar research ship was named RRS Sir David Attenborough in his honour. While an internet poll suggesting the name of the ship had the most votes for Boaty McBoatface, the science minister Jo Johnson said there were "more suitable names"; the official name was eventually picked up from one of the other more favoured choices. However, one of its research sub-sea vehicles was named "Boaty" in recognition of the public vote.

Attenborough is also recognised by Guinness World Records as having the longest career as a natural historian and presenter in television.

==== Genera and species named after Attenborough ====
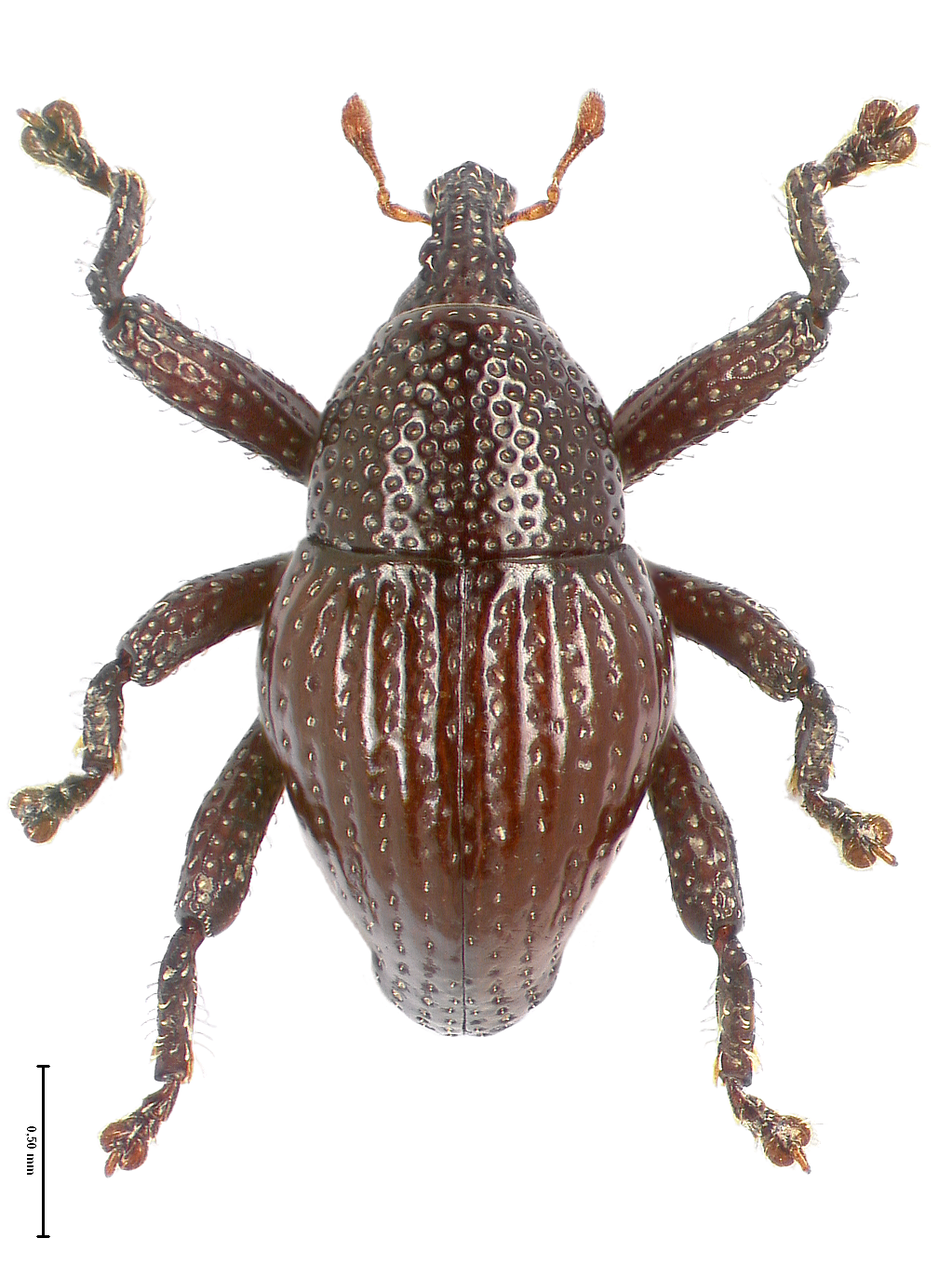
Trigonopterus attenboroughi

At least 20 species and genera, both living and extinct, have been named in Attenborough's honour. Plants named after him include an alpine hawkweed (Hieracium attenboroughianum) discovered in the Brecon Beacons, a species of Ecuadorian flowering tree (Blakea attenboroughi), one of the world's largest-pitchered carnivorous plants (Nepenthes attenboroughii), along with a genus of flowering plants (Sirdavidia).

Several arthropods are named after Attenborough, including: a butterfly, Attenborough's black-eyed satyr (Euptychia attenboroughi); a dragonfly, Attenborough's pintail (Acisoma attenboroughi); a millimetre-long goblin spider (Prethopalpus attenboroughi); an ornate Caribbean smiley-faced spider (Spintharus davidattenboroughi); an Indonesian flightless weevil (Trigonopterus attenboroughi); a Madagascan ghost shrimp (Ctenocheloides attenboroughi); and a soil snail (Palaina attenboroughi). To mark his 100th birthday, the genus of ichneumon wasps Attenboroughnculus was named after him.

The Monogenean Cichlidogyrus attenboroughi, a parasite from a deep-water fish in Lake Tanganyika, is named after him. Several vertebrates have also been named after Attenborough, including: a Namibian lizard (Platysaurus attenboroughi); a bird (Polioptila attenboroughi); a Peruvian frog (Pristimantis attenboroughi); a Madagascan stump-toed frog (Stumpffia davidattenboroughi); and one of only four species of echidna (Zaglossus attenboroughi).

In 1993, after discovering that the Mesozoic reptile Plesiosaurus conybeari did not belong to the genus Plesiosaurus, the palaeontologist Robert Bakker renamed the species Attenborosaurus conybeari. A fossilised armoured fish discovered in Western Australia in 2008 was named Materpiscis attenboroughi, after Attenborough had filmed at the site and highlighted its scientific importance in Life on Earth. The Materpiscis fossil is believed to be the earliest organism capable of internal fertilisation.

In 2015, a species of tree from Gabon (in the Annonaceae family) Sirdavidia Couvreur & Sauquet was named with his title.

A fossil marsupial lion, Microleo attenboroughi, was named in his honour in 2016. The fossil grasshopper Electrotettix attenboroughi was named after Attenborough. In March 2017 a 430-million-year-old small crustacean was named after him. Called Cascolus ravitis, the first word is a Latin translation of the root meaning of "Attenborough" and the second is based on a description of him in Latin. In July 2017, the Caribbean bat Myotis attenboroughi was named after him. A new species of fan-throated lizard from coastal Kerala in southern India was named Sitana attenboroughii in his honour when it was described in 2018.

In 2018, a new species of phytoplankton, Syracosphaera azureaplaneta, was named to honour The Blue Planet, the television documentary presented by Attenborough, and to recognise his contribution to promoting understanding of the oceanic environment. The same year, Attenborough was also commemorated in the name of the scarab beetle Sylvicanthon attenboroughi.

In 2020, Nothobranchius attenboroughi, a brightly coloured seasonal fish species, was described in his honour. It is endemic to Tanzania and it is known from ephemeral pools and marshes associated with the Grumeti River and other small systems draining into Lake Victoria at the east side of the lake, largely within the Serengeti-Mara ecosystem. The small seasonal fish inhabit ephemeral habitats in freshwater wetlands and have extreme life-history adaptations, having an annual life cycle, a key adaptation to reproduce in the seasonally arid savannah biome and allowing the eggs to survive the periodic drying up of the seasonal natural habitats.

In 2021, an extinct species of horseshoe crab was named Attenborolimulus superspinosus. In July 2022, a fossil of a 560-million-year-old creature named Auroralumina attenboroughii, which researchers believe to be the first animal predator, was named after Attenborough. In 2026, a parasitic wasp, Attenboroughnculus tau, was named after him to celebrate his 100th birthday.

=== Awards ===
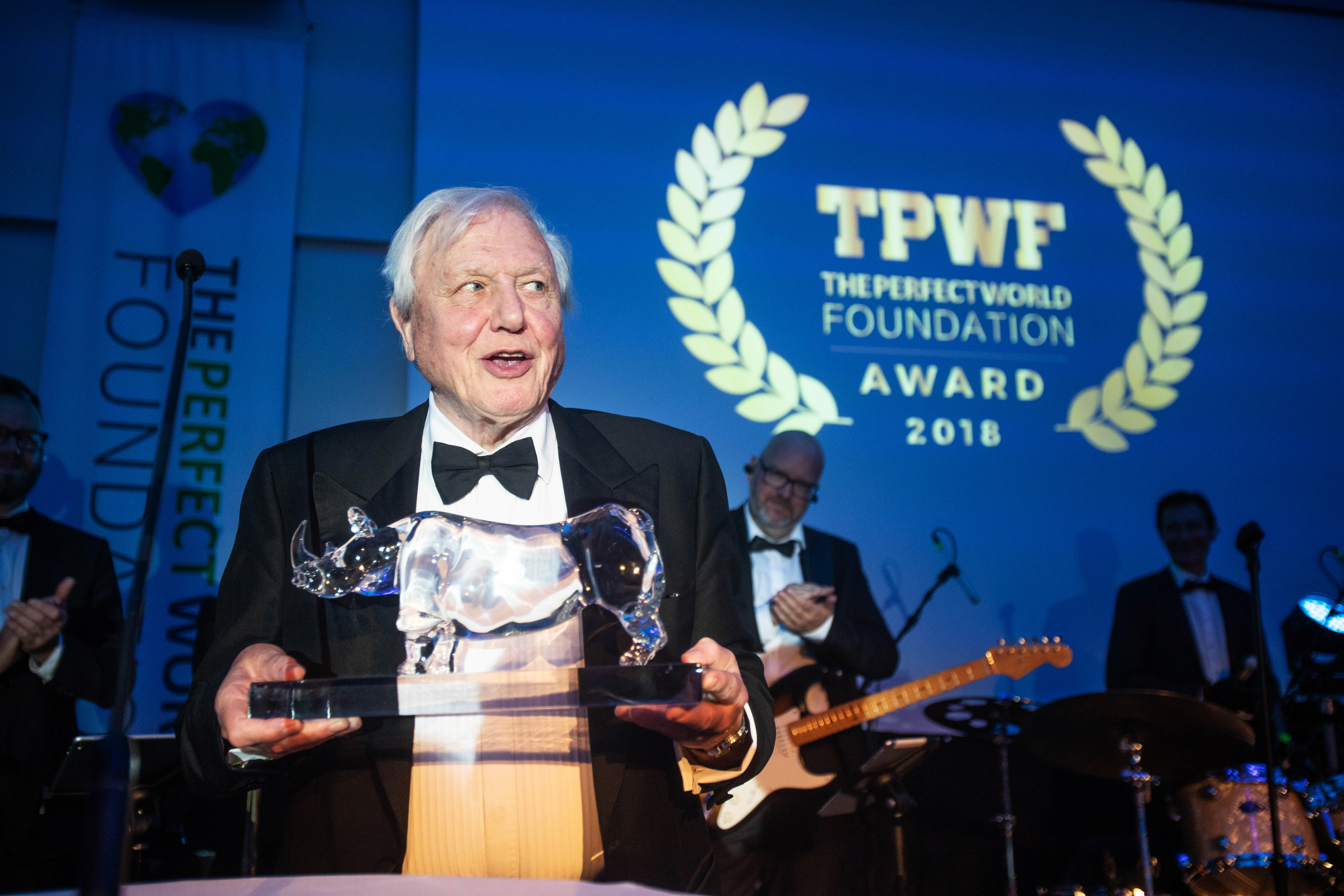
Attenborough in 2018 receiving The Perfect World Foundation Award

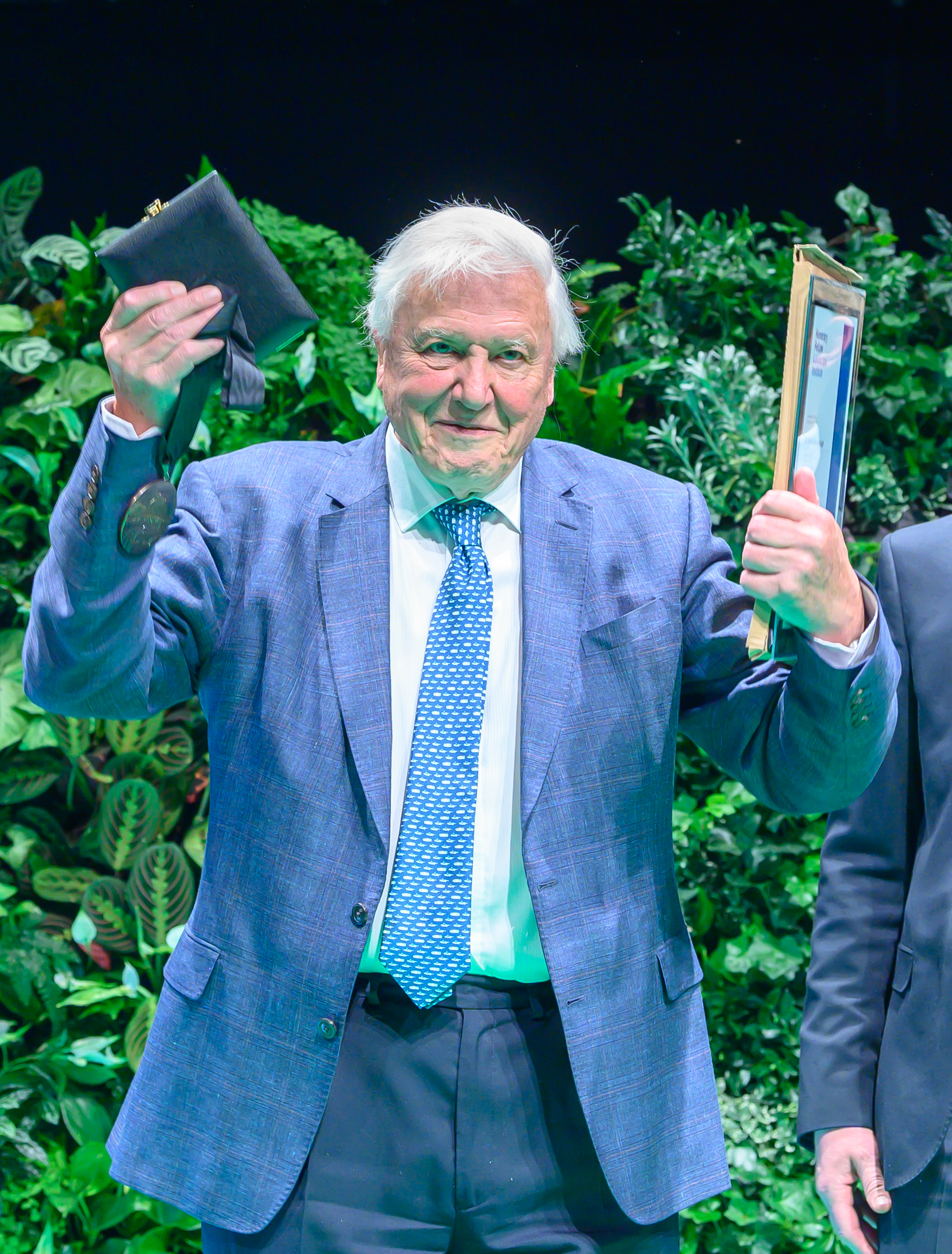
Attenborough receiving the Landscape Institute Medal for Lifetime Achievement and becoming an Honorary Fellow of the Landscape Institute in 2019

Year	Award	Refs.
1972	Royal Geographical Society's Cherry Kearton Medal and Award	
1974	Appointed Commander of the Order of the British Empire (CBE) for services to nature conservation in the 1974 Birthday Honours	
1980	BAFTA Fellowship	
1981	Kalinga Prize for the Popularization of Science from UNESCO	
1983	Elected a Fellow of the Royal Society (FRS)	
1985	Knight Bachelor in the 1985 Birthday Honours	
1991	Commander of the Royal Victorian Order (CVO) for producing Queen Elizabeth II's Christmas broadcast for a number of years from 1986 in the 1991 Birthday Honours	
1991	Foreign Honorary Member of the American Academy of Arts and Sciences	
1992	Elected Honorary Fellow of the Royal Academy of Arts	
1996	Kew International Medal	
1996	Member of the Order of the Companions of Honour (CH) for services to nature broadcasting in the 1996 New Year Honours	
2000	International Cosmos Prize	
2000	RSPB Medal	
2003	Michael Faraday Prize awarded by the Royal Society	
2004	Descartes Prize for Outstanding Science Communication Actions	
2004	Caird Medal of the National Maritime Museum	
2004	José Vasconcelos World Award of Education awarded by the World Cultural Council	
2005	Member of the Order of Merit (OM)	
2005	Nierenberg Prize for Science in the Public Interest	
2006	National Television Awards Special Recognition Award	
2006	Institute of Ecology and Environmental Management	
2006	The Culture Show British Icon Award	
2007	British Naturalists' Association Peter Scott Memorial Award	
2007	Fellowship of Society of Antiquaries	
2008	The Royal Photographic Society Progress medal and Honorary Fellowship	
2009	Prince of Asturias Award	
2010	Fonseca Prize	
2010	Queensland Museum Medal	
2011	Society for the History of Natural History Founders' Medal	
2011	Association for International Broadcasting International TV Personality of the year	
2012	IUCN Phillips Memorial Medal for outstanding service in international conservation	
2015	Individual Peabody Award	
2017	Britain–Australia Society Award for outstanding contribution to strengthening British/Australian bilateral understanding and relations	
2017	Honorary Member of the Moscow Society of Naturalists	
2017	Gold Medal of the Royal Canadian Geographical Society	
2018	Primetime Emmy Award for Outstanding Narrator	
2018	The Perfect World Foundation Award	
2019	Primetime Emmy Award for Outstanding Narrator	
2019	Landscape Institute Medal for Lifetime Achievement	
2019	Landscape Institute Honorary Fellow (HonFLI)	
2019	Crystal Award at the World Economic Forum in Davos, Switzerland	
2019	Indira Gandhi Peace Prize	
2019	Chatham House Prize	
2020	Knight Grand Cross of the Order of St Michael and St George (GCMG) in the 2020 Birthday Honours for services to television broadcasting and to conservation	
2021	Lifetime Achievement Award (Champions of the Earth)	
2022	Champion of the Earth award from the United Nations Environment Programme	
2022	Lifetime Achievement Award at 43rd News and Documentary Emmy Awards	
2023	UK's Favourite TV Presenter of All Time (Perspectus Global)	
2023	Commander of the Order of Merit of the Italian Republic	
2024	Stephen Hawking Medal for Science Communication – Special Lifetime Achievement, awarded by Starmus Festival	
2025	Daytime Emmy Award Outstanding Daytime Personality – Non-Daily	
2026	National Television Awards – Best TV Presenter	

As of 2014, he was the only person to have won BAFTA Awards for programmes in black and white, colour, high-definition and 3D.

== Filmography ==
Attenborough's television credits span eight decades. His association with natural history programmes dates back to Animal Patterns and Zoo Quest in the early 1950s. His most influential work, 1979's Life on Earth, launched a strand of nine authored documentaries with the BBC Natural History Unit which shared the Life strand name and spanned 30 years. He narrated the long-running BBC series Wildlife on One. Later in his career, he narrated several high-profile BBC wildlife documentaries, among them The Blue Planet and Planet Earth. He became a pioneer in the 3D documentary format with Flying Monsters in 2010, and again in his 2025 cinema release of Ocean With David Attenborough.

== Bibliography ==
Attenborough's work as an author has strong parallels with his broadcasting career. In the 1950s and 1960s, his published work included accounts of his animal collecting expeditions around the world, which became the Zoo Quest series. He wrote an accompanying volume to each of his nine Life documentaries, along with books on tribal art and birds of paradise. His autobiography, Life on Air, was published in 2002 and revised in 2009, and is one of a number of his works which is available as a self-narrated audiobook. Attenborough has contributed forewords and introductions to many other works, notably those accompanying Planet Earth, Frozen Planet, Africa and other BBC series he has narrated.

- Zoo Quest to Guiana (1956)
- Zoo Quest for a Dragon (1957) – republished in 1959 to include an additional 85 pages titled Quest for the Paradise Birds
- Zoo Quest in Paraguay (1959)
- Quest in Paradise (1960)
- People of Paradise (1960)
- Zoo Quest to Madagascar (1961)
- Quest Under Capricorn (1963)
- Fabulous Animals (1975)
- The Tribal Eye (1976)
- Life on Earth (1979)
- Discovering Life on Earth (1981)
- The Living Planet (1984)
- The First Eden: The Mediterranean World and Man (1987)
- The Atlas of the Living World (1989)
- The Trials of Life (1990)
- The Private Life of Plants (1994)
- The Life of Birds (1998)
- The Life of Mammals (2002)
- Life on Air: Memoirs of a Broadcaster, BBC Books (2002) – autobiography, revised and updated edition in 2009, 416 pages with index. ISBN 978-1-849-90001-0
- Life in the Undergrowth (2005)
- Amazing Rare Things: The Art of Natural History in the Age of Discovery (2007) – with Susan Owens, Martin Clayton and Rea Alexandratos
- Life in Cold Blood (2007)
- David Attenborough's Life Stories (2009)
- David Attenborough's New Life Stories (2011)
- Drawn From Paradise: The Discovery, Art and Natural History of the Birds of Paradise (2012) – with Errol Fuller
- Adventures of a Young Naturalist: The Zoo Quest Expeditions (2017)
- Journeys to the Other Side of the World: Further Adventures of a Young Naturalist (2018)
- Dynasties: The Rise and Fall of Animal Families with Stephen Moss (2018)
- A Life on Our Planet: My Witness Statement and a Vision for the Future (2020) ISBN 9781538719985
- Ocean: Earth's Last Wilderness with Colin Butfield (2025)

== See also ==
- List of centenarians (actors, filmmakers and entertainers)

Media offices
Preceded by Michael Peacock	Controller of BBC Two; 1965–1969	Succeeded by Robin Scott
Non-profit organization positions
Preceded by Dunstan Adams	President of the Royal Society for Nature Conservation; 1991–1995	Succeeded by David Bellamy
Preceded by Position established	President Emeritus of the Royal Society for Nature Conservation; 2012–present	Succeeded by Current
