= Climate Change – The Facts =

BBC documentary film by David Attenborough

- Directed by: Serena Davies
- Presented by: David Attenborough

Production
- Producer: Serena Davies
- Running time: 60 minutes
- Production companies: BBC Studios Science Unit; IWC Media

Original release
- Network: BBC One
- Release: 18 April 2019

Climate Change – The Facts is a 2019 British documentary presented by David Attenborough that discusses climate change and possible solutions to counteract it. The one-hour programme made its debut on BBC One in the United Kingdom at 9pm on 18 April 2019.

== Reception ==
The film won general praise from critics for highlighting the dangers that could be presented by not doing enough to tackle climate change. The Guardian called it a "rousing call to arms", while The Telegraph described the title as "robust" and praised the use of Attenborough as presenter: "At a time when public debate seems to be getting ever more hysterical, it's good to be presented with something you can trust. And we all trust Attenborough."
