= Life on Earth (TV series) =

1979 British nature documentary television series

- Region 2 DVD cover
- Genre: Nature documentary
- Presented by: David Attenborough
- Composer: Edward Williams
- Country of origin: United Kingdom
- Original language: English
- No. of episodes: 13

Production
- Executive producer: Christopher Parsons
- Producers: Richard Brock; John Sparks
- Running time: 55 minutes
- Production companies: BBC Natural History Unit; Warner Bros. Television; Reiner Moritz Productions

Original release
- Network: BBC Two
- Release: 16 January – 10 April 1979

Related
- The Living Planet

Life on Earth: A Natural History by David Attenborough is a British television natural history series made by the BBC in association with Warner Bros. Television and Reiner Moritz Productions. It was transmitted in the UK from 16 January 1979.

During the course of the series presenter David Attenborough, following the format established by Kenneth Clark's Civilisation and Jacob Bronowski's The Ascent of Man (both series which he designed and produced as director of BBC2), travels the globe in order to trace the story of the evolution of life on the planet. Like the earlier series, it was divided into 13 programmes (each of around 55 minutes' duration). The executive producer was Christopher Parsons and the music was composed by Edward Williams.

At a cost exceeding £1 million ($1.2 million), it was an immense project that involved filming over 100 locations around the world and took three years in the making by a team of 30 people with the help of more than 500 scientists. Highly acclaimed as a milestone in the history of British wildlife television, it established Attenborough as not only the foremost television naturalist, but also an iconic figure in British cultural life. It is the first in Attenborough's Life series of programmes and was followed by The Living Planet (1984).

== Filming techniques ==
Several special filming techniques were devised to obtain some of the footage of rare and elusive animals. One cameraman spent hundreds of hours waiting for the fleeting moment when a Darwin's frog, which incubates its young in its mouth, finally spat them out. Another built a replica of a mole rat burrow in a horizontally mounted wheel, so that as the mole rat ran along the tunnel, the wheel could be spun to keep the animal adjacent to the camera. To illustrate the motion of bats' wings in flight, a slow-motion sequence was filmed in a wind tunnel. The series was also the first to include footage of a live (although dying) coelacanth.

The cameramen took advantage of improved film stock to produce some of the sharpest and most colourful wildlife footage that had been seen to date.

The programmes also pioneered a style of presentation whereby David Attenborough would begin describing a certain species' behaviour in one location, before cutting to another to complete his illustration. Continuity was maintained, despite such sequences being filmed several months and thousands of miles apart.

== Gorilla encounter ==
The best-remembered sequence occurs in episode 12, when Attenborough encounters a group of mountain gorillas in Dian Fossey's sanctuary in Rwanda. The primates had become used to humans through years of being studied by researchers. Attenborough originally intended merely to get close enough to narrate a piece about the apes' use of the opposable thumb, but as he advanced on all fours toward the area where they were feeding, he suddenly found himself face to face with an adult female. Discarding his scripted speech, he turned to camera and delivered a whispered ad lib:

There is more meaning and mutual understanding in exchanging a glance with a gorilla than any other animal I know. We're so similar. Their sight, their hearing, their sense of smell are so similar to ours that we see the world in the same way as they do. They live in the same sort of social groups with largely permanent family relationships. They walk around on the ground as we do, though they are immensely more powerful than we are. So if ever there was a possibility of escaping the human condition and living imaginatively in another creature's world, it must be with the gorilla. The male is an enormously powerful creature but he only uses his strength when he is actually protecting his own family from a marauding male from another group, and it's very, very rare that there is any violence within the group. So it seems really very unfair that man should have chosen the gorilla to symbolise all that is aggressive and violent, when that is the one thing that the gorilla is not—and that we are.

When Attenborough returned to the site the next day, the female and two young gorillas began to groom and play with him. In his memoirs, Attenborough describes this as "one of the most exciting encounters of my life". He subsequently discovered, to his chagrin, that only a few seconds had been recorded: the cameraman was running low on film and wanted to save it for the planned description of the opposable thumb.

In 1999 viewers of Channel 4 voting for the 100 Greatest TV Moments placed the gorilla sequence at number 12—ranking it ahead of Queen Elizabeth II's coronation and the wedding of Charles and Diana.

== Critical and commercial reception ==
The series attracted a weighted average of 15 million viewers in the UK, an exceptionally high figure for a BBC documentary back in the late 1970s. It was also a major international success, being sold to over 100 territories and watched by an estimated audience of 500 million people worldwide. However, Life on Earth did not generate the same revenue for the BBC as later Attenborough series because the corporation signed away the American and European rights to their co-production partners, Warner Bros. and Reiner Moritz.

It was nominated for four BAFTA TV awards and won the Broadcasting Press Guild Award for Best Documentary Series. In a list of the 100 Greatest British Television Programmes drawn up by the British Film Institute in 2000, voted for by industry professionals, Life on Earth was placed 32nd.

== Episodes ==
No.	Title	Original release date
1	"The Infinite Variety"	16 January 1979
The episode begins in the South American rainforest whose rich variety of life forms is used to illustrate the sheer number of different species. Since many are dependent on others for food or means of reproduction, David Attenborough argues that they could not all have appeared at once. He sets out to discover which came first, and the reasons for such diversity. He starts by explaining the theories of Charles Darwin and the process of natural selection, using the giant tortoises of the Galápagos Islands (where Darwin voyaged on HMS Beagle) as an example. Fossils provide evidence of the earliest life, and Attenborough travels a vertical mile into the Grand Canyon in search of them. By the time he reaches the Colorado River bed, the geological strata are 2,000 million years old—yet there are no fossils. However, the "right rocks" are found on the shores of Lake Superior in Canada, where wafer-thin slices of flint, called chert, reveal filaments of primitive algae. Also, the micro-organisms that flourish at Yellowstone Park in Wyoming appear to be identical to the Earth's oldest fossils. The evolution of single-celled creatures, from simple cyanophytes to more complex ciliates, and then from multi-celled sponges and jellyfish to the many variations of coral and its associated polyps, is discussed in detail. The fossilised remains of jellyfish are shown within the Flinders Ranges of Australia, and are estimated to be 652 million years old.
2	"Building Bodies"	23 January 1979
The next programme explores the various sea-living invertebrates. In Morocco, the limestones are 600 million years old, and contain many invertebrate fossils. They fall broadly into three categories: shells, crinoids and segmented shells. The evolution of shelled creatures is demonstrated with the flatworm, which eventually changed its body shape when burrowing became a necessity for either food or safety. It then evolved shielded tentacles and the casings eventually enveloped the entire body: these creatures are the brachiopods. The most successful shelled animals are the molluscs, of which there are some 80,000 different species. Some are single-shelled such as the cowrie, while others are bivalves that include the scallop and the giant clam. One species that has remained unchanged for millions of years is the nautilus: it features flotation chambers within its shell, which in turn formed the basis for the ammonites. Crinoids are illustrated by sea lilies, starfish and sea urchins on the Great Barrier Reef. Segmented worms developed to enable sustained burrowing, and well-preserved fossils are found in the Rocky Mountains of British Columbia. These developed into trilobites and crustaceans, and the horseshoe crab is shown nesting in vast numbers on Delaware Bay. While the robber crab breeds in the sea, it is in all other respects a land animal and Attenborough uses it to exemplify the next evolutionary step.
3	"The First Forests"	30 January 1979
This instalment examines the earliest land vegetation and insects. The first plants, being devoid of stems, mainly comprised mosses and liverworts. Using both sexual and asexual methods of reproduction, they proliferated. Descended from segmented sea creatures, millipedes were among the first to take advantage of such a habitat and were quickly followed by other species. Without water to carry eggs, bodily contact between the sexes was now necessary. This was problematical for some hunters, such as spiders and scorpions, who developed courtship rituals to ensure that the female did not eat the male. Over time, the plants' cell walls strengthened and they grew taller. Ferns and horsetails were among the first such species. Insects then evolved wings to avoid climbing and the dragonfly (which once had a wingspan of 60 centimetres) is one of the most successful. The elaborate wingbeats of the damselfly are shown slowed down 120 times. Some plants, like the cycad enlisted the insects to transport pollen, while others, like the conifer, spread spores. Over a third of forests contain conifers and the giant sequoia of California is the largest living organism of any kind: it grows to a height of 112 metres. The conifer secretes resin to repair its trunk, and this survives as amber. Within it, insect specimens have been found that are 200 million years old. In fact, at this time, every insect known today was already in existence.
4	"The Swarming Hordes"	6 February 1979
This episode details the relationship between flowers and insects. There are some one million classified species of insect, and two or three times as many that are yet to be labelled. Around 300 million years ago, plants began to enlist insects to help with their reproduction, and they did so with flowers. Although the magnolia, for instance, contains male and female cells, pollination from another plant is preferable as it ensures greater variation and thus evolution. Flowers advertise themselves by either scent or display. Some evolved to produce sweet-smelling nectar and in turn, several insects developed their mouth parts into feeding tubes in order to reach it. However, to ensure that pollination occurs, some species—such as the orchid—have highly complicated mechanisms that must be negotiated first. Others, such as the yucca and its visiting moths, are dependent on one another. Hunters, such as the mantis, are camouflaged to match the flowers and leaves visited by their prey. Since an insect's skin is chitinous, it has to shed it periodically in order to grow, and the caterpillar, its chrysalis or cocoon and resulting butterfly or moth is one of the more complex examples. Termites, ants and some bees and wasps overcame any limitations of size by grouping together and forming superorganisms. The green tree ants of south-east Asia are shown to display the most extraordinary co-operation when building their nests.
5	"Conquest of the Waters"	13 February 1979
This programme looks at the evolution of fish. They have developed a multitude of shapes, sizes and methods of propulsion and navigation. The sea squirt, the lancelet and the lamprey are given as examples of the earliest, simplest types. Then, about 400 million years ago, the first backboned fish appeared. The Kimberley Ranges of Western Australia are, in fact, the remnants of a coral reef and the ancient seabed. There, Attenborough discovers fossils of the earliest fish to have developed jaws. These evolved into two shapes of creature with cartilaginous skeletons: wide ones (like rays and skates) and long ones (like sharks). However, it is the fully boned species that were most successful, and spread from the oceans to rivers and lakes. To adapt to these environments, they had by now acquired gills for breathing, a lateral line to detect movement and a swim bladder to aid buoyancy. Coral reefs contain the greatest variety of species, many of which are conspicuously coloured to ward off predators or attract mates. Their habitat, with its many hiding places within easy reach, allows them to remain so visible. However, the open ocean offers no such refuge, so there is safety in numbers—both hunters and hunted swim in shoals and have streamlined bodies for pursuit or escape. Most species that live below the thermocline, in the freezing depths of the ocean, have never been filmed, and these are largely represented by still photographs.
6	"Invasion of the Land"	20 February 1979
The next instalment describes the move from water to land. The fish that did so may have been forced to because of drought, or chose to in search of food. Either way, they eventually evolved into amphibians. Such creatures needed two things: limbs for mobility and lungs to breathe. The mudskipper and the coelacanth are shown as fish with bony fins that could have developed into legs, and the lungfish is able to absorb gaseous oxygen. However, evidence of an animal that possessed both is presented in the 450-million-year-old fossilised remains of a fish called a eusthenopteron. Three groups of amphibians are explored. The caecilians have abandoned legs altogether to aid burrowing, newts and salamanders need to return to the water to allow their skins to breathe, but it is frogs and toads that have been the most successful. Attenborough handles a goliath frog, the largest of the species, to demonstrate its characteristics. Their webbed feet form parachutes that turn them into "dazzling athletes", and some can leap over 15 metres—100 times their body length. In addition, their vocal sacs ensure that mating calls can be heard from up to a mile away. Poison dart frogs deter predators by means of venom, and one such example could kill a human. Various methods of breeding are examined, including laying eggs in rivers, depositing them in other damp habitats for safety or, as with the Brazilian pipa, embedding them within the skin of the parent itself.
7	"Victors of the Dry Land"	27 February 1979
This episode is devoted to the evolution of reptiles. They are not as restricted as their amphibian ancestors, since they can survive in the hottest climates. The reason is their scaly, practically watertight skin. The scales protect the body from wear and tear and in the case of some species of lizard, such as the Australian thorny devil, serve to protect from attack. The horned iguana from the West Indies is also one of the most heavily armoured. The skin is rich in pigment cells, which provide effective means of camouflage, and the chameleon is a well-known example. Temperature control is important to reptiles: they cannot generate body heat internally or sweat to keep cool. Therefore, they rely on the sun and areas of shade. The reptiles were the first vertebrates for whom internal fertilisation was essential, so they developed the watertight egg, which hatches fully formed young. The age of the dinosaurs is explored, and Attenborough surmises that it may have been climate change that led to their abrupt demise. Those that survived were water-dwellers, and the bull Nile crocodile is the largest reptile alive today. Snakes evolved when burrowing lizards lost their legs but returned above ground. The boa, puff adder and sidewinder demonstrate methods of locomotion, the egg-eating snake has an extreme example of a hinged jaw, and the lethal diamondback rattlesnake is described as the most efficient at despatching its prey.
8	"Lords of the Air"	6 March 1979
This programme focuses on birds. The feather is key to everything that is crucial about a bird: it is both its aerofoil and its insulator. The earliest feathers were found on a fossilised Archaeopteryx skeleton in Bavaria. However, it had claws on its wings and there is only one species alive today that does so: the hoatzin, whose chicks possess them for about a week or so. Nevertheless, it serves to illustrate the probable movement of its ancestor. It may have taken to the trees to avoid predators, and over time, its bony, reptilian tail was replaced by feathers and its heavy jaw evolved into a keratin beak. Beaks come in a variety of shapes depending on a bird's feeding habits: examples given include the pouched bill of a pelican, the hooked beak of the vulture and the elongated mouth of the hummingbird. Attenborough hails the tern as one of the most graceful flyers and the albatross as a skilled glider. The swift is shown as one of the fastest: it can fly at 170 km/h. Birds communicate through display and/or song, and the elaborate courtship rituals of New Guinea's birds-of-paradise are shown. All birds lay eggs, and the range of different nesting sites and parenting skills is explored. Finally, Attenborough visits Gibraltar to observe migratory birds. These rely on thermals when flying overland and use height to conserve energy when crossing oceans. It is estimated that some 5,000 million southbound birds cross the Mediterranean Sea each autumn.
9	"The Rise of the Mammals"	13 March 1979
This instalment is the first of several to concentrate on mammals. The platypus and the echidna are the only mammals that lay eggs (in much the same manner of reptiles), and it is from such animals that others in the group evolved. Since mammals have warm blood and most have dense fur, they can hunt at night when temperatures drop. It is for this reason that they became more successful than their reptile ancestors, who needed to heat themselves externally. Much of the programme is devoted to marsupials (whose young are partially formed at birth) of which fossils have been found in the Americas dating back 60 million years. However, because of continental drift, this kind of mammal flourished in Australia. Examples shown include the quoll, the Tasmanian devil, the koala, the wombat and the largest marsupial, the red kangaroo. The thylacine was similar to a wolf but is now thought to be extinct. In 1969, bones of creatures such as a 3-metre-tall kangaroo and a ferocious marsupial lion were found in a cave in Naracoorte, South Australia. The reason for these animals' extinction is, once again, thought to be climate change. Finally, Attenborough describes the most prolific mammals—those that originated in the Northern Hemisphere and give birth to fully formed young. He states, "The placenta and the womb between them provide a degree of safety and a continuity of sustenance which is unparalleled in the animal world."
10	"Theme and Variations"	20 March 1979
This episode continues the study of mammals, and particularly those whose young gestate inside their bodies. Attenborough asks why these have become so varied and tries to discover the common theme that links them. Examples of primitive mammals that are still alive today include the treeshrew, the desman and the star-nosed mole. Insect eaters vary enormously from the aardvark, giant anteater and pangolin to those to which much of this programme is devoted: the bats, of which there are nearly 1,000 different species. These took to flying at night, and it is possible that they evolved from treeshrews that jumped from tree to tree, in much the same way as a flying squirrel. Most bats use sonar to hunt and navigate, and ultrasound to communicate. However, some of their prey, such as the lacewing and tiger moth, have developed techniques to confuse and evade them. Aquatic mammals superseded sea-going reptiles such as the plesiosaur. The whales' immense size is related to the retention of body heat. The dinosaurs' growth was limited by the strength of their bones but the whales only rely on water to support their weight, and so have been able to grow into the world's largest animals. Some of those shown include humpbacks, narwhals, killer whales and dolphins. The latter use echolocation in much the same way as bats, and Attenborough observes one finding objects in the water even after it has been blindfolded.
11	"The Hunters and Hunted"	27 March 1979
This programme surveys mammal herbivores and their predators. The herbivores began to populate the forests when the dinosaurs disappeared, and many took to gathering food at night. To prepare for winter, some store it in vast quantities, some hibernate and others make do as best they can. However, the carnivores joined them, and when a drying climate triggered the spread of grass, they followed their prey out on to the plains. Grass is not easily digestible and most animals that eat it have to regurgitate it and chew the cud. Out in the open, the leaf-eaters had to develop means of protection. A few species turned into burrowers: examples include the blind mole-rat, which is completely underground, and the prairie dog, which is not. The capybara—the largest rodent—spends much of its time in the water. Those that evolved long legs and hooves, such as the zebra and impala, seek safety in speed, while larger creatures, such as the rhinoceros, rely on their armoured hides. The elephant is the world's largest land animal and is virtually invulnerable. Cheetahs and lions are attracted by those that herd in large numbers, like wildebeest. The cheetah uses its considerable speed while the heavier lion is a social predator, mostly using co-operation and stealth to capture its victims, and its methods are explored in detail. Meanwhile, a pack hunter, such as the hyena, has immense stamina and will eventually wear down its quarry, easing the kill.
12	"Life in the Trees"	3 April 1979
The penultimate instalment investigates the primates, whose defining characteristics are forward-facing eyes for judging distance, and gripping hands with which to grasp branches, manipulate food and groom one another. The programme begins in Madagascar, home to the lemurs, of which there are some 20 different types. Two examples are the sifaka, which is a specialised jumper, and the indri, which has a well-developed voice. Away from Madagascar, the only lemur relatives to have survived are nocturnal, such as the bushbaby, the potto and the loris. The others were supplanted by the monkeys and a primitive species that still exists is the smallest, the marmoset. However, Attenborough selects the squirrel monkey as being typical of the group. Howler monkeys demonstrate why they are so named—their chorus is said to the loudest of any mammal—and their prehensile tails illustrate their agility. However, such tails are not characteristic of monkeys that inhabit Africa and many of them, such as vervets and baboons, are just as happy on the ground. Others have moved elsewhere, and the macaques of Koshima in Japan have learned to wash their food before eating. Most apes have taken to swinging from trees, and their feet are just as versatile as their hands. They include the orangutan, the gibbon, the chimpanzee and the primate with whom Attenborough has arguably his most famous encounter, the mountain gorilla.
13	"The Compulsive Communicators"	10 April 1979
The final episode deals with the evolution of the most widespread and dominant species on Earth: humans. The story begins in Africa, where, some 10 million years ago, apes descended from the trees and ventured out into the open grasslands in search of food. They slowly adapted to the habitat and grew in size. Their acute sense of vision led to them standing erect to spot predators, leaving their hands free to bear weapons. In addition, the primitive apemen (Anthropopithecus) also had stones that were chipped into cutting tools. Slowly, they grew taller and more upright, and their stone implements became ever more elaborate. Furthermore, animal hunting expeditions required a degree of co-operation to achieve a successful outcome. Therefore, Attenborough argues, such foresight, teamwork and planning must have meant some skill at communication. Homo erectus gradually spread from Africa and reached Europe some 800,000 years ago, where a drop in temperature led to him inhabiting caves. Such creatures evolved further and learned to use flint for weapons, animal skins for clothing, and fire for warmth and preparing food. Their brains became fully formed and, using the walls of their caves as a canvas, they painted and eventually learned to write. Homo sapiens had arrived. However, Attenborough warns, just because humans have achieved so much in such a comparatively short period of time, it may not mean that they will be around forever.

== 1997 revision ==
A shortened series, using the footage and commentary from the original, was aired in 1997, edited down to three episodes: early life forms, plants, insects, and amphibians in the first; fish, birds and reptiles in the second; and mammals in the third.

== DVD, Blu-ray and book ==
The series is available in the UK for Regions 2 and 4 as a four-disc DVD set (BBCDVD1233, released 1 September 2003) and as part of The Life Collection. In 2012 the series was released as a four-disc Blu-ray set (released 12 November 2012).

A hardback book, Life on Earth by David Attenborough, was published in 1979 and became a worldwide bestseller. Its cover image of a Panamanian red-eyed tree frog, was taken by Attenborough himself, became an instantly recognisable emblem of the series. It is currently out of print.

A revised and updated edition of the book was published in 2018 to favourable reviews. Most if not all of the images in the 2018 edition are new, but the text remains substantially the same as the original.

== Music ==
Edward Williams' avant-garde score matched the innovative production techniques of the television series. Williams used a traditional chamber music ensemble of (harp, flute, clarinet, strings and percussion) combined with electronic sounds. The pieces were crafted scene-by-scene to synchronise with and complement the imagery on screen: in one sequence examining the flight of birds, the instrumentation mirrors each new creature's appearance. The sounds were processed through an early British synthesiser, the EMS VCS 3, to create its evocative sound.

"I started using the filters and voltage control of the VCS 3 on conventionally created classical sounds by the orchestra. It made possible all sorts of marvellous explorations of new sounds which could then be made into music."

— Edward Williams, speaking in 2009

The score was never intended to be released commercially, but Williams had 100 copies pressed as gifts for the musicians involved. One of these LPs found its way into the hands of Jonny Trunk, owner of independent label Trunk Records, who negotiated the licence from the BBC. The soundtrack was finally released on 2 November 2009.
