= David Attenborough filmography =

The following is a chronological list of television series and individual programmes in which Sir David Attenborough is credited as a writer, presenter, narrator, producer, interviewee, or other role. In a career spanning eight decades, Attenborough's name has become synonymous with the natural history programmes produced by the BBC Natural History Unit.

== Major projects ==
=== 1950s ===
Year	Title	Duration	Subject	Credit(s)
1952	Coelacanth	1x10 min	The rediscovery of the prehistoric coelacanth. Attenborough's first programme for the BBC (as producer). Presented by Julian Huxley.	Producer
1952	Animal, Vegetable, Mineral?	4x30 min	Quiz show based on the game Twenty Questions, which ran until 1959. Scientists would try to guess the origin of specimens from museum and university collections. Episodes: "Belfast Museum and Art Gallery", "Bankfield Museum", "The Royal Scottish Museum", "Royal Albert Memorial" (all 1953).	Producer
1953	Song Hunter	6x20 min	Folk music, presented by and featuring performances by Alan Lomax.	Producer
1953	Animal Patterns	3x30 min	Animal camouflage, warning signals and courtship displays. Presented by Julian Huxley. Attenborough's first natural history series.	Producer
1953	Animal Disguises	4x40 min	An expanded version of Animal Patterns for BBC Children's Television, this series brought Attenborough his first regular on-screen role, co-presenting with Julian Huxley.	Presenter
1954	It's a Small World	4x15 min	Listed as a BBC series "giving a close-up view of tiny things".	Producer
1954	Zoo Quest	6x30 min	Documenting the wildlife of Sierra Leone, this was the first series fronted by Attenborough and the first to feature him filmed on location. It was re-edited and re-released in 1955 as the single documentary Zoo Quest to West Africa	Writer, presenter, sound-recordist and producer
1955	Zoo Quest to Guiana	6x30 min	Attenborough's second Zoo Quest series documents an expedition to Guyana in South America.	Writer, presenter, sound-recordist and producer
1956	Zoo Quest for a Dragon	6x30 min	This Zoo Quest series on the wildlife of Indonesia features the first known footage of the Komodo dragon.	Writer, presenter, sound-recordist and producer
1957	Quest for the Paradise Birds	6x30 min	Attenborough's first trip to the island of New Guinea in an attempt to film the courtship displays of the native birds of paradise.	Writer, presenter, sound-recordist and producer
1959	Zoo Quest in Paraguay	6x30 min	Attenborough returned to South America and visited the grasslands and wetlands of Paraguay.	Writer, presenter, sound-recordist and producer

=== 1960s ===
Year	Title	Duration	Subject	Credit(s)
1960	The People of Paradise	6x30 min	Anthropology and natural history of the South Pacific. Episode list: "The Land Divers of Pentecost", "Cargo Cult", "The Fire Walkers of Fiji", "Outer Islands of Fiji", "Royal Tonga".	Writer, presenter, sound-recordist and producer
1960	Elsa the Lioness	1x30 min	Following Joy and George Adamson as they search for Elsa the Lioness and her three cubs.	Producer and presenter
1960	Travellers' Tales	-	Long-running series made by Attenborough's BBC Travel and Exploration Unit, which also featured Armand and Michaela Denis's on Safari programmes. Episodes associated with Attenborough: "Savage New Guinea", "Festival in Kano", "Hill Tribes of the Deccan", "White Elephant", "Men of the Dream Time", "Caribbean Expedition", "Hunters of Spitzbergen", "The Opium People", "The Leg Rowers of Burma", "Chop! Music and Zulu Dancing", "Adriatic Journey", "Antarctic Adventure", "Dancing Dervishes", "In Search of Stanley", "Overland to Singapore", "The Hidden Valley of Apa Tanis", "Pygmies of the Congo", "The Choco Indians of Colombia", "Head Hunters and Giraffe Women", "The Fur-trappers of Greenland", "Lapland Summer", "The Bird Cliffs of Lofoten", "The Strange Creatures of Galapagos", "Unknown India", "Chinese Journey", "The Ascent of Annapurna IV", "'Sherpa'; Land of the Lost", "The Land of the Gurkhas".	Producer and narrator
1961	Zoo Quest to Madagascar	6x30 min	Filming and collecting animals in Madagascar.	Writer, presenter, sound-recordist and producer
1961	Japan	8x30 min	History and culture of the Japanese people.	Producer
1962	Destruction of the Indian	3x30 min	How contact with the modern world has affected remote Indian tribes of South America.	Producer
1963	Attenborough and Animals	10x25 min	First series for children. Comparing different species. Episodes: "Apes, Lemurs and Orang-utangs", "Armadilloes, Sloths and Anteaters", "Bird Architects – From the Argentine to Australia", "Bird Mysteries and Problems, Including the Rhea and the Birds of Paradise", "Lizards from Australia, South America and Malaya", "Crocodiles and Turtles – And How to Catch Them", "Ants from America, Australia and Africa", "Moths, Mud Wasps and Praying Mantises", "Clams and Crabs from the Pacific and Indian Oceans".	Presenter
1963	Quest Under Capricorn	6x30 min	Final Zoo Quest series, filmed in the Northern Territory of Australia, was also Attenborough's final natural history series before moving into BBC management. Episode list: "The Desert Gods", "Hermits of Borroloola", "Buffalo, Geese and Men", "The Artists of Arnhem Land", "Bush Walkabout", "The First Australians".	Writer, presenter, sound-recordist and producer
1965	Zambezi	3x50 min	A journey down the Zambezi. Episode list: "Lord of the Land", "The Ancient Highway", "Livingstone's River".	Writer and presenter
1967	Life: East Africa	3x40 min	Series of interviews conducted by Attenborough with African conservationists, from the Serengeti Research Institute.	Writer and presenter
1967	The World About Us	-	Commissioned during his tenure as Controller of BBC Two, Attenborough narrated around 20 episodes of this long-running series between 1969 and 1982. Episode list: "Koko the Gorilla", "Unnatural History", "Asmat – Cannibal craftsmen of New Guinea", "The Predators", "Courtship", "Lions of Serengeti", "Extinction?", "Goblins of the Forest", "The Field – the Great Bustard", "Elephant Kingdom", "The Hyena Story", "Baboons of Gombe", "Baobab", "Geese are only Human", "Danger! Venomous Animals", "El Condor", "Yanomama – Sons of the Blood", "A Sheltered Existence", "The Discoverers: The 400th Edition of the World around Us", "Wild Dogs of Africa", "Woodpecker", "Voices in the Forest", "A Noble Savage", "Ascension Island", "The Underground Movement", "Lemurs – Ghosts at the End of the World", "Greenpeace Voyages to Save the Whale". Also presented at least one episode : The Mick Burke Award 1978	Narrator
1969	The Miracle of Bali	3x50 min	The Indonesian island of Bali.	Narrator and producer

=== 1970s ===
Year	Title	Duration	Subject	Credit(s)
1971	A Blank on the Map	1x60 min	Encounters with the Bikaru people in the New Guinea forest.	Writer and presenter
1973	Eastwards with Attenborough	6x30 min	First natural history series after resigning as BBC Controller. Visit to South East Asia. Episode list: "The Strange Caves of Borneo", "Fire Giants of Sumatra", "Mudbuilders of Borneo", "Green Ceilings of Borneo", "Borneo's Cathedral of Trees", "Life and Death in Paradise".	Writer and presenter
1973	The Life Game	1x90 min	Genetics and evolution, written by Nigel Calder and produced by Adrian Malone.	Presenter
1973	Natural Break	15x10 min	A series of short programmes based on archive footage, produced by John Sparks.	Presenter
1973	Royal Institution Christmas Lectures	6x60 min	Science lectures on the language of animals. Episodes: "The Languages of Animals: Beware", "The Languages of Animals: Be Mine", "The Language of Animals: Parents and Children", "The Language of Animals: Foreign Languages", "The Languages of Animals: Animal Language, Human Language".	Writer and presenter
1973	Omnibus	1x60 min	Wrote and presented one episode (Series 7, Episode 2, "The Savage Image"). Film about the ceremonies, paintings and sculptures of the people along the Sepik River in New Guinea.	Writer and presenter
1973–1975	The Explorers	10x50 min	Recreating the voyages of famous explorers, at the time the most expensive series ever commissioned by the BBC. Episode list: "The Story of Roald Amundsen", "The Story of Charles Montagu Doughty", "The Story of Henry Morton Stanley", "The Story of Burke and Wills", "The Story of Mary Kingsley", "The Story of Jedediah Strong Smith", "The Story of Alexander von Humboldt", "The Story of Captain James Cook", "The Story of Francisco Pizarro", "The Story of Christopher Columbus".	Introducer and narrator
1975	Fabulous Animals	6x25 min	Children's television series which featured Attenborough reading books about mythological creatures. Episode list: "Here be Monsters", "Marvels of the Deep", "Dragons and Serpents", "Winged Creatures", "Horns of Magic", "Man or Beast".	Presenter
1975	The Tribal Eye	7x50 min	BBC documentary series on tribal art, of which Attenborough is a keen collector. Episode list: "Behind the Mask", "Crooked Beak of Heaven", "The Sweat of the Sun", "Kingdom of Bronze", "Woven Gardens", "Man Blong Custom", "Across the Frontiers".	Writer and presenter
1975	Flying Prince of Wildlife	1x60 min	The story of the conservation efforts of Prince Bernhard of the Netherlands (1911–2004).	
1976	The Discoverers	6x30 min	Pioneering explorers, discoverers and scientists in the field of natural history. Episode list: "The Bone Hunters", "The Bug Collectors", "The Wanderer and the Woodsman", "The Unknown Ocean", "The Rare and the Curious".	Presenter
1976	Omnibus	1x60 min	Attenborough introduces the episode "The Sound of Islam" (Series 9, Episode 31)	Presenter
1977	Wildlife on One	253x30 min	Half-hour natural history programmes for BBC One. Ran annually until 2005.	Presenter
1979	Life on Earth	13x55 min	The history of life on Earth. Took three years to make and was notable for its ground-breaking footage.	Writer and presenter

=== 1980s ===
Year	Title	Duration	Subject	Credit(s)
1980	The Spirit of Asia	8x60 min	The cultures and religions of the people of Asia. Episodes list: "The World of Shadows", "The Morning of the World", "Land of the Cosmic Mountain", "The Story of Rama", "The Haunted Land", "Artists in Exile", "God-Kings of Angkor", "Land of a Million Buddhas".	Narrator
1980	Benjamin Britten – A Time There Was	1x103 min	About composer Benjamin Britten. Aired as part of The South Bank Show.	Archive director
1981	The Ark in South Kensington	1x40 min	The Natural History Museum at South Kensington.	Presenter
1984	The Living Planet	12x55 min	How various living organisms have adapted to their surroundings.	Writer and presenter
1985	The Million Pound Bird Book	1x60 min	Biography of American naturalist John James Audubon.	Writer and presenter
1986	World Safari	1x90 min	A live television event featuring broadcasts from across the world.	Co-presenter
1987	The First Eden	4x60 min	The Mediterranean.	Writer and presenter
1989	Lost Worlds, Vanished Lives	4x40 min	Fossils. Episodes: "Magic in the Rocks", "Putting Flesh on Bone", "Dinosaur", "The Rare Glimpses".	Writer and presenter

=== 1990s ===
Year	Title	Duration	Subject	Broadcaster	Credit(s)
1990	The Trials of Life	12x50 min	The final part of the original "Life" trilogy, focussing on animal behaviour.	BBC	Writer and presenter
1993	QED (episode "Gallop to Freedom")	1x45 min	Release of Przewalski horses.	BBC	Narrator
1993	Life in the Freezer	6x30 min	The natural history of Antarctica.	BBC	Writer and presenter
1993	Arena (episode "Radio Night")	1x120 min	Introduction to celebrations of television and radio.	BBC	Presenter
1994	Heart of a Nomad	1x60 min	Attenborough interviews the explorer and writer Wilfred Thesiger.	BBC	Presenter
1995	The Private Life of Plants	6x50 min	Life cycle of plants.	BBC	Writer and presenter
1996	Attenborough in Paradise	1x55 min	Various kinds of birds of paradise in the forests of Papua New Guinea.	BBC	Writer and presenter
1996	Winners and Losers	2x45 min	Following the fortunes of endangered species examined in the 1960s documentary The Rare Ones.	BBC	Narrator
1996	Survival Island	1x42 min	IMAX film by David Douglas and Christopher Parsons. Various animal populations of South Georgia island.	IMAX	Writer and narrator
1996	Cities of the Wild	1x42 min	IMAX film by David Douglas and Christopher Parsons.	IMAX	Narrator and producer
1998	The Life of Birds	10x50 min	Various species of birds and their ways of life.	BBC	Writer and presenter
1998	The Origin of Species: An Illustrated Guide	1x30 min	An introduction to Charles Darwin's theory of evolution.	BBC	Narrator
1999	Sharks – The Truth	1x50 min	Part of BBC One's Shark Summer season.	BBC	Narrator
1999	They Said It Couldn't Be Done	7x60 min	Attenborough interviews wildlife film-makers at the Royal Geographical Society.	BBC	Presenter
1999	Satoyama I: Japan's Secret Watergarden	1x52 min	How the residents of a village in Satoyama live in harmony with nature.	NHK	Narrator

=== 2000s ===
Year	Title	Duration	Subject	Broadcaster	Credit(s)
2000	State of the Planet	3x50 min	The detrimental effect mankind has on environment.	BBC	Writer and presenter
2000	The Lost Gods of Easter Island	1x50 min	The history of an Easter Island figure Attenborough bought at an auction in the 1990s.	BBC	Writer and presenter
2000	Living with Dinosaurs	1x50 min	The reasons why some reptiles living at the time of dinosaurs did not die out with them.	BBC	Narrator
2000	The Greatest Wildlife Show on Earth	1x50 min	Christmas special.	BBC	Presenter
2000	The Song of the Earth	1x50 min	A Natural History of Music. Included in the Attenborough DVD collection.	BBC	Presenter
2001	The Blue Planet	8x50 min	The natural history of the world's oceans.	BBC	Narrator
2002	The Life of Mammals	10x50 min	Mammals.	BBC	Writer and presenter
2002	Great Natural Wonders of the World	1x60 min	Sequel to The Greatest Wildlife Show on Earth.	BBC	Presenter
2002	Life on Air	1x60 min	Attenborough's 50 years in television. Included in the Attenborough DVD collection.	BBC	Guest interviewee
2004	Satoyama II: Japan's Secret Water Garden	1x52 min	How the residents of a village in Satoyama live in harmony with nature.	NHK	Narrator
2005	Animal Crime Scene	5x60 min	Examining the "Murder Cases" in the animal kingdom.	BBC	Narrator
2005	Life in the Undergrowth	5x50 min	The life of insects and invertebrates.	BBC	Writer and presenter
2006	Planet Earth	11x50 min	The variety of the entire planet. Filmed over four years in 64 countries.	BBC	Narrator
2006	The Planet Earth Diaries	2x60 min	Look behind the scenes at how Planet Earth was filmed.	BBC	Narrator
2006	The Truth about Climate Change	2x60 min	Global warming.	BBC	Writer and presenter
2006	Gorillas Revisited with Sir David Attenborough	1x60 min	Attenborough revisits the group of Rwanda's mountain gorillas.	BBC	Presenter
2007	Climate Change: Britain Under Threat	1x60 min	The effects of climate change on Great Britain.	BBC	Presenter
2007	Tom Harrisson: The Barefoot Anthropologist	1x60 min	Biography of Tom Harrisson.	BBC	Presenter
2007	Attenborough Explores... Our Fragile World	1x60 min	The issue of the global environmental crisis.	BBC	Writer and presenter
2008	Life in Cold Blood	5x50 min	The life of reptiles and amphibians.	BBC	Writer and presenter
2008	Humpbacks: From Fire to Ice	1x50 min	The humpback whale - made for Australian television.	ABC TV	Narrator
2008	Tiger: Spy in the Jungle	3x60 min	The life of tiger cubs in the Indian jungle.	BBC	Writer and presenter
2009	Charles Darwin and the Tree of Life	1x60 min	Darwin's theory of evolution.	BBC	Writer and presenter
2009	Nature's Great Events	6x50 min	Some of the greatest annual wildlife events on the planet.	BBC	Narrator
2009	Uncovering Our Earliest Ancestor: The Link	1x60 min	Documentary coinciding with the announcement of a 47-million-year-old primate fossil.	BBC	Writer and narrator
2009	Life	10x50 min	Wildlife from all over Earth in ten episodes.	BBC	Writer and narrator

=== 2010s ===
Year	Title	Duration	Subject	Broadcaster /Publisher	Credit(s)
2010	David Attenborough's First Life	2x60 min	The origin of life on Earth, investigating the evidence from the earliest fossils.	BBC	Writer and presenter
2010	The Death of the Oceans?	1x60 min	The pressure of human population on world oceans.	BBC	Writer and presenter
2010	Flying Monsters 3D	1x70 min	3D film about pterosaurs.	Sky	Writer and presenter
2011	Madagascar	3x60 min	The landscape and wildlife of Madagascar.	BBC	Narrator
2011	Attenborough and the Giant Egg	1x60 min	The extinct "elephant bird" of Madagascar.	BBC	Writer and presenter
2011	Desert Seas	1x60 min	The wildlife off the coast of Saudi Arabia.	Nat Geo Wild	Narrator
2011	Frozen Planet	7x60 min	The natural history of the polar regions.	BBC	Narrator/presenter
2012	The Penguin King	1x75 min + 1x49 min "Making of"	Sky 3D film charting the lives of king penguins on South Georgia.	Sky	Writer and narrator
2012	Secrets of Wild India	3x60 min	Indian wildlife series, broadcast on Nat Geo Wild.	Nat Geo Wild	Narrator
2012	Superfish: Bluefin Tuna (aka Hot Tuna)	1x60 min	Bluefin tuna in the wild.	BBC	Narrator
2012	Kingdom of Plants	3x60 min	3D series filmed at the Royal Botanical Gardens, Kew.	Sky	Writer and presenter
2012	Attenborough's Ark: A Natural World Special	1x60 min	Attenborough picks ten endangered animals.	BBC	Writer and presenter
2012	Attenborough: 60 Years in the Wild	3x60 min	Attenborough's career in wildlife filming.	BBC	Writer and presenter
2012	Hummingbirds: Jewelled Messengers	1x45 min	Hummingbirds.	UKTV	Presenter
2012	Sir David Attenborough – A Life on Earth	1x54 min	A live show. Attenborough is interviewed by Ray Martin during a tour of Australia.	BBC	Interviewee
2013	Galapagos 3D	3x45 min + 1x50 min "Making of"	Galapagos Islands.	Sky	Writer and presenter
2013	David Attenborough's Natural Curiosities	5x30 min	Series 1. Episode list: "Stretched to the Limit", "A Curious Hoax?", "Young Wrinklies", "A Curious Twist", "Seeing the Pattern".	UKTV	Writer and presenter
2013	Africa	6x60 min	A profile of the natural history of Africa.	BBC	Narrator and presenter
2013	Micro Monsters 3D	6x22 min	3D filming techniques show lives of bugs and insects. Episode list: "Conflict", "Predator", "Courtship", "Reproduction", "Family", "Colony".	Sky	Narrator and presenter
2013	Wild Cameramen at Work	4x30 min	The work of leading wildlife cameramen. Episode list: "Sky", "Ice", "Sea", "Land".	BBC	Narrator and presenter
2013	Triumph of the Vertebrates (aka Rise of Animals)	2x60 min	500 million year rise of vertebrates.	BBC	Writer and presenter
2014	David Attenborough's Natural Curiosities	10x30 min	Series 2. Episode list: "Virgin Births", "Armoured Animals", "Life in the Dark", "Curious Imposters", "Bad Reputations", "Shocking Senses", "Life on Ice", "Spinners and Weavers", "Strange Parents", "Magical Appearances".	UKTV	Writer and presenter
2014	David Attenborough's Natural History Museum Alive	1x65 min	CGI imagery is used to bring to life several of the extinct animals housed in the Natural History Museum in London.	Sky	Writer and presenter
2014	Life Story	6x60 min	Animals dealing with challenges in various stages of their life.	BBC	Narrator and presenter
2015	David Attenborough's Conquest of the Skies 3D	3x60 min	Birds, bats and flying insects.	Sky	Writer and presenter
2015	Attenborough's Paradise Birds	1x60 min	The history of Paradise birds.	BBC	Writer and presenter
2015	David Attenborough's Natural Curiosities	6x22 min	Series 3. Episode list: "Impossible Feats", "Curious Minds", "Expandable Bodies", "Curious Feeders", "Curious Cures", "Remarkable Regeneration".	UKTV	Writer and presenter
2015	Wild City (aka Cities of the Wild)	6x45 min	The wildlife of Singapore.	Sky	Narrator
2015	The Hunt	7x60 min	The hunting strategies of key predators.	BBC	Narrator and presenter
2015	Great Barrier Reef with Sir David Attenborough	3x60 min + 1x50 min "Making of"	The presenter returns to the Great Barrier Reef, 50 years after his first visit.	BBC	Writer and presenter
2015-2025	Deep Ocean	5x60 min	Occasional programmes following scientific expeditions as they explore the deep oceans	NHK	Narrator
2016	Attenborough and the Giant Dinosaur (aka Raising the Dinosaur Giant)	1x58 min	The excavation of bone remains of a new species of gigantic dinosaur in southern Argentina, since named Patagotitan.	BBC	Writer and presenter
2016	Attenborough's Life That Glows (aka David Attenborough's Light on Earth)	1x60 min	Various examples of bio-luminescence in the natural world.	BBC	Writer and presenter
2016	Attenborough's Passion Projects	4x60 min	Attenborough chooses four favourite documentaries from his 60 years of filming.	BBC	Interviewee and presenter
2016	Planet Earth II	6x60 min	Sequel series to Planet Earth.	BBC	Narrator and presenter
2016	Zoo Quest in Colour	1x90 min	Old Zoo Quest footage shown in colour for the first time.	BBC	Interviewee, narrator and presenter
2017	Plants Behaving Badly	2x45 min	Two groups of plants that fascinated Charles Darwin. Episode list: "Murder and Mayhem" (carnivorous plants), "Sex and Lies" (orchids).	UKTV	Presenter
2017	David Attenborough's Natural Curiosities	6x22 min	Series 4. Episode list: "Animal Frankensteins", "Finding the Way", "Extreme Babies", "Curious Counters", "Incredible Shells", "Ferocious Fighters".	UKTV	Writer and presenter
2017	Blue Planet II	7x60 min	Sequel series to The Blue Planet.	BBC	Narrator and presenter
2017	Attenborough and the Giant Elephant	1x60 min	"Jumbo" the famous circus elephant.	BBC	Writer and presenter
2018	The Queen's Green Planet	1x45 min	Exploring the gardens of Buckingham Palace with The Queen.	ITV	Presenter
2018	Attenborough and the Sea Dragon	1x60 min	Ichthyosaur – a giant sea dragon that once ruled the oceans.	BBC	Writer and presenter
2018	David Attenborough's Tasmania	1x50 min	Tasmania's diverse habitats, seasons and animals.	ABC	Narrator
2018	Dynasties	5x60 min	Episode list: "Chimpanzee", "Emperor", "Lion", "Painted Wolf", "Tiger".	BBC	Narrator and presenter
2019	Wild Karnataka	1x53 min	UHD documentary film on the rich biodiversity of Karnataka, India.	Discovery	Narrator
2019	Our Planet	8x48–54 min + 1x63 min "Making of"	A global overview of wildlife spectacles.	Netflix	Narrator and presenter
2019	Climate Change – The Facts	1x60 min	Climate crisis.	BBC	Narrator and presenter
2019	Seven Worlds, One Planet	7x60 min	Earth's seven continents.	BBC	Narrator and presenter

=== 2020s ===
Year	Title	Duration	Subject	Broadcaster/ publisher	Credit(s)
2020	Extinction: The Facts	1x60 min	A study of global biodiversity loss, examining its causes and how it can be reversed.	BBC	Narrator and presenter
2020	David Attenborough: A Life on Our Planet	1x83 min	Attenborough's "witness statement". He reflects on his career as a naturalist and the devastating changes he has seen.	Netflix	Narrator and presenter
2021	A Perfect Planet	5x60 min	Attenborough discovers how diverse forces work together to keep our planet in perfect balance.	BBC	Narrator
2021	Life in Colour	3x59 min	Attenborough explores the many ways animals use colour throughout their lives.	BBC	Presenter
2021	Breaking Boundaries: The Science of Our Planet	1x73 min	Attenborough and scientist Johan Rockström examine Earth's biodiversity collapse and how this crisis can still be averted.	Netflix	Presenter
2021	The Mating Game	5x60 min	Attenborough explores the extraordinary intricacies of animal mating habits.	BBC	Narrator
2021	The Earthshot Prize: Repairing Our Planet	5x60 min	Attenborough and Prince William explore simple, ambitious ideas to repair our planet - solutions offering hope for nature and humanity.	BBC	Narrator and presenter
2022	Attenborough's Wonder of Song	1x60 min	Attenborough chooses seven of the most remarkable animal songs found in nature and explores the significance of these songs in the lives of their species.	BBC	Narrator and presenter
2022	The Green Planet	5x60 min	A global profile of the kingdom of plants.	BBC	Presenter
2022	Dinosaurs: The Final Day with David Attenborough	1x90 min	Attenborough examines theories which could explain the extinction of the dinosaurs.	BBC	Presenter
2022	Dynasties II	4x60 min	The second series of Dynasties follows four families of wild animals – the elephant, cheetah, puma and hyena – as they try to survive with the odds stacked against them.	BBC	Narrator
2022	Prehistoric Planet	5x42 min	This documentary series follows a series of animal stories built around diverse dinosaur species who lived around the globe in various climates 66 million years ago. It uses the latest paleontological research and computer-generated imagery to reimagine the lives of dinosaurs and other life of that period.	Apple TV	Narrator
2022	Frozen Planet II	6x60 min	A sequel to Frozen Planet (2011), focussing on the natural history of the world's coldest regions.	BBC	Narrator
2023	Wild Isles	5x60 min	The diverse landscapes and wildlife of the British Isles.	BBC	Presenter
2023	Prehistoric Planet 2	5x40 min	Second series of Prehistoric Planet.	Apple TV	Narrator
2023	Our Planet II	4x50 min	A sequel to Netflix's Our Planet (2019) focusing on animal migrations.	Netflix	Narrator
2023	Planet Earth III	8x60 min	A sequel to Planet Earth and Planet Earth II.	BBC	Narrator and presenter
2024	Secret World of Sound with David Attenborough	3x60 min	New technology reveals nature's soundscapes and the crucial role sound plays in the lives of animals.	Sky	Narrator and presenter
2024	Mammals	6x60 min	Six-part series exploring the diverse lives and habitats of mammals.	BBC	Presenter
2024	Asia	7x60 min	A profile of the natural history of Earth's largest continent. Produced by Matthew Wright.	BBC	Presenter
2025	Parenthood	5x60 min	Examining the extraordinary lengths animals go to bring up their young.	BBC	Narrator
2025	Kingdom	6x60 min	Following lion, leopard, wild dog and hyena families in a Zambian National Park.	BBC	Narrator
2026	Secret Garden	5x60 min	Attenborough discovers some of Britain's most diverse gardens and their elusive wildlife.	BBC	Narrator
2026	Blue Planet III	6x60 min	A sequel to The Blue Planet and Blue Planet II.	BBC	Narrator

== Other programmes ==
In addition to writing, presenting, narrating, and producing his own documentaries, Attenborough has made regular appearances as an on-screen and off-screen participant in other filmmakers' documentaries and on other numerous television programmes. The following list includes some of his more notable appearances, as well as his involvement with long-running shows:

=== 1950s ===
Year	Title	Duration	Subject	Credit(s)
1953	The Dreaded Savage	1x20 min	Alain Gheerbrant recounting his experiences among the Guaharibo Indians near the Orinoco.	Producer
1954	Out of Doors	1x150 min	Hiking, camping and gardening.	Producer
1955	The Trans-Antarctic Expedition 1955–58	6x30 min	The progress of Vivian Fuchs and his Commonwealth expedition's overland crossing of Antarctica.	Presenter and producer
1955	Panorama: "Programme 12"	-		Guest interviewee
1956	The Berbers of the Atlas Mountains	1x30 min		Producer
1957	Bororo: The Unknown Nomads	1x30 min		Presenter
1957	Mainly for Women	-	BBC series.	Producer
1958	The Volcanoes of Sahara	2x30 min	The Tibesti mountains of northern Chad.	Producer
1959	Sails Off Singapore	1x40 min		Narrator
1959	Science is News	-		Narrator

=== 1960s ===
Year	Title	Duration	Subject	Credit(s)
1961	Adventure	-	Attenborough is credited as narrator or producer of following episodes: "The Shrines of China", "Crusaders Path", "The Land of the Queen of Sheba", "Voodo Island", "Dyak", "Turkoman", "The Tombs of Petra", "Lhasa", "Forbidden City", "The Peaks of Peru", "Dalai Lama", "Magicians of the Black Hills", "Sixty-five Survivors", "North through Afghanistan", "The Wandering Herdsmen of the Sahara", "Wings in the Malayan Forest", "The Hidden Sanctuaries of Prester John", "The Tunnel of Samos", "The Lost Men of Malaya", "The Unknown Mountains of Nepal", "Search for the Hobolos", "The Caviar Fishermen of the Caspian", "Ballon from Lake Manyara", "Voyage Under the Earth", "Ballon from Zanzibar", "Trail to Dawson City", "The Cave of the Assassins", "Ballon to Serengeti", "The Dragon Story", "The Cocaine-Eaters of Colombia", "Bushmen of the Kalahari", "The Men without a Bow", "Kon-Tiki", "Snakes Alive", "The Riddle of Easter Island".	Narrator and producer
1961	World Zoos	-	Episodes: "London", "Tel Aviv", "Moscow", "The Biblical Zoo at Jerusalem", "San Diego", "Edinburgh"	Presenter
1962	Festival in Adelaide	1x53 min	Adelaide Festival of the Arts.	Self
1963	Let's Imagine: The Perfect Horse	1x35min	Various breeds of horses.	Narrator
1964	Discovery of the Penicillin	1x12 min	Made by the government's Central Office of Information. Attenborough narrates but is uncredited.	Narrator
1964	Indoors and Out: Man and the Land	8x20 min	Series of short documentaries in which Attenborough visits London, the Scotland Highlands, Fair Isle, New Forest, and other places in the UK. Episode list: "Mountains and Moorland", "Island Home", "Concrete Desert", "The Fens", "The Highway", "Granite Cliffs", "Green Forests", "The Open Fields". BBC series.	Narrator
1965	Two Quest – Attenborough Discovers Manchester	1x6 min	Short parody from Late Night Line-Up with an Attenborough lookalike exploring Manchester, accompanied by chopped-up Attenborough narration from previous programmes used humorously.	Narrator
1966	Faraway Places – The Quests of David Attenborough	12x30 min	Twelve short documentaries based on material filmed during the Zoo Quest expeditions.	Narrator

=== 1970s ===
Year	Title	Duration	Subject	Credit(s)
1972	Around the World in 80 Minutes – A Guided Tour of Our Spectacular Planet	1x80 min		Narrator and presenter
1972	Late Night Line-Up	1x30 min	The last episode of the show, featuring an interview with Attenborough.	Guest interviewee
1972	Chronicle	1x50 min	Series 7, Episode: "The Other Contest"	Award presenter
1973	Baobab: Portrait of a Tree	1x52 min	Documentary about the giant baobab tree of Africa and the microenvironment it provide to wildlife. Later reused to be made into a World About Us episode.	Narrator
1974	Spectacular Britain	1x60 min	An hour-long film about how the country’s nature changes in one year.	Narrator
1975	Children of The Way	1x60 min	The life of the various Muslim communities in Great Britain. BBC series.	Narrator
1976	In Search of Strange Animals	1x60 min		Narrator
1976	The Zoo	1x50 min	The history of the London Zoo.	Narrator
1978	At Home with Badgers	1x24 min	This film looks at Eric Ashby's commitment to the study and welfare of Badgers.	Narrator
1978	Sunday Special: The Gold of El Dorado	1x40 min	One episode.	Presenter
1978–1985	Wildtrack	88x30 min	Attenborough reported seven episodes between 1979 and 1984	Reporter

=== 1980s ===
Year	Title	Duration	Subject	Credit(s)
1980	Gilbert White Lived Here	1x15 min	British naturalist Gilbert White. BBC. 1 episode.	Presenter
1980	Wildlife Talkabout	-	Series of programmes in which the personalities of the output of the BBC Natural History Unit talk about their work and experiences working on the various series produced by the Unit.	Guest interviewee
1980	The Private Life of the Robin: Robin Scott – The BBC Remembers	-	BBC show about the BBC Controller Robin Scott.	Guest interviewee
1980	In the Limelight with Lesley	-	Lesley Judd's show in which Attenborough answers questions from an audience of 50 children.	Guest
1980	An Everyday Miracle	1x30 min	Follows the development of an unborn child, recording the baby's first few months of life inside the womb, culminating in the birth.	Narrator
1981	The Primates: Upright Man	-	Attenborough gives an insight into the conditions of man's emergence through the evolution of the African apes and the evolution of man, tracing the emergence of Homo sapiens back 5–10 million years ago to our origins on the African plains.	Narrator
1982	Omnibus	-	Attenborough interviews Lucie Rie about her studio pottery. Series 16, episode 6.	Presenter
1982	Wildlife Jubilee	-	The development of BBC's Natural History Unit in Bristol.	Interviewee
1982	Videobook of British Garden Birds	1x70 min	Species of birds found in British town and country gardens.	Presenter and narrator
1983	Rainbow Safari	-		Narrator
1983	Voices in the Forest	1x57 min	Documentary about the use of Paradise bird feathers in the life of New Guinea people. (PBS Nature - Season 2, Episode 6)	Narrator
1984	HMS Pandora : In Pursuit of the Bounty	1x56 min	The story of the Royal Navy frigate, HMS Pandora, sent to the Pacific in 1790 to capture Fletcher Christian and his band of HMS Bounty mutineers. Attenborough narrates the discovery of the largely intact wreck on the outer Barrier Reef and its recovery by the Queensland Museum. Produced by Living Pictures, directed by David Flatman.	Narrator
1984–2019	Natural World	-	BBC Two series still on air, for which Attenborough has narrated or presented in following episodes: 1984: "The Kiwai, Dugong hunters of Daru". 1988: "Twilight of the Dreamtime". 1992: "Mpingo: The Tree That Makes Music". 1993: "Echo of the Elephants". 1994: "Killer Whales: Wolves of the Sea; Mysteries of the Ocean Wanderers". 1996: "Echo of the Elephants: The Next Generation", "Incredible Suckers", "Lions: Pride in Peril", "Attenborough in Paradise", "Sperm Whales: Back from the Abyss". 1997: "Echo of the Elephants: Africa's Forgotten Elephants". 1998: "The Dragons of Galapagos", "South Georgia: An Island All Alone". 1999: "Islands of the Vampire Birds". 2000: "Bowerbirds: The Art of Seduction". 2001: "The Lost Elephants of Timbuktu". 2003: "Highgrove: A Prince's Legacy". 2004: "Five Big Cats and a Camera", "Shark Coast", "The Amber Time Machine". 2005: "Echo of the Elephants: The Final Chapter?". 2006: "Satoyama: Japan's Secret Water Garden" - This episode was made by combining NHK - Satoyama I: Japan's Secret Watergarden (1999) and NHK - Satoyama II Japan's Secret Water Garden (2004). 2007: "Battle to Save the Tiger", "Desert Lions". 2008: "Badgers: Secrets of the Sett", "Clever Monkeys", "Cuckoo", "Lobo: The Wolf that Changed America", "Snow Leopard, Beyond The Myth", "Superfish". 2009: "Cassowaries", "Bringing Up Baby". 2010: "Birds of Paradise", "Echo, an Unforgettable Elephant", "Elsa, the Lioness that Changed the World", "Panda Makers", "The Himalayas". 2011: "Animal House", "Komodo, Secrets of the Dragon". 2012: "Madagascar, Lemurs and Spies", "The Real Jungle Book Bear", "Attenborough's Ark", "Living with Baboons". 2013: "Giant Squid: Filming the Impossible", "Meerkats: Secrets of an Animal Superstar", "The Mating Game". 2014: "Attenborough's Fabulous Frogs", "The Bat Man of Mexico". 2015: "Africa's Fishing Leopards", "Attenborough's Big Birds", "Galapagos: Islands of Change", "Mountain Lions: Big Cats in High Places". 2016: "Jaguars: Brazil's Super Cats", "Giraffes: Africa's Gentle Giants". 2017: "Attenborough and the Empire of the Ants", "Hotel Armadillo", "Puerto Rico: Island of Enchantment". 2018: "Attenborough's Wonder of Eggs", "Pangolins: The World's Most Wanted Animal". 2019: "Tasmania: Weird and Wonderful", "Hippos: Africa's River Giants".	Occasional narrator, writer or presenter
1985	The National Science Test II	-	Episode of NOVA, the science series on Channel 13.	Panelist
1985	The Oral History of the BBC	1x60 min	Part of BBC – Oral History Collection initiated by Frank Gillard in 1972, interview date: 8 May 1985	Sole interviewee
1986	Television and Natural History	-	Desmond Morris gives an overview of natural history programmes on the BBC.	Guest interviewee
1986	Interest the Boy in Nature	-	Viewpoint '86 (TV series) - Series 1, Episode 9.	Guest interviewee
1986	Huw Wheldon by His Friends	-	BBC's omnibus.	Guest interviewee
1986	Wild Britain	-	BBC series. Appears in one episode.	Presenter
1987	Glass Kingdoms at Kew	-	Conservatories at Kew. BBC series.	Narrator and presenter
1987	Politics of the Jungle	-	The destruction of Borneo jungles in order to plant oil palms.	Narrator
1987	Unnatural History	-	The Royal Television Society Huw Wheldon Memorial Lecture 1987	Lecturer
1988	Waorani – The Last People	1x40 min	The life of the last 100 Waorani Indians in Guyana.	Narrator
1988	Brathay Explores	1x18 min	Exploration expeditions of the Brathay Trust from 1948 to 1988.	Narrator
1988	The New Battle for Britain	-	First broadcast on 4 September 1988	Guest presenter
1989	The Pitt Rivers Museum is Shut	1x37 min	Pitt Rivers Museum.	Guest presenter
1989	Beyond 2000 – Climate in Crisis	1x45 min	Documentary warning on climate change.	Interviewee
1989	Nature's Champion: A Tribute to Sir Peter Scott	-	Work of Peter Scott, leading British naturalist.	Interviewee
1989	BBC RSPB Video Guide to British Garden Birds	1x85 min	Video guide to British garden birds.	Presenter and narrator

=== 1990s ===
Year	Title	Duration	Subject	Credit(s)
1990	David Attenborough's Animals of the British Countryside	1x60 min	Attenborough focuses on Britain's land mammals in this video guide.	Narrator
1990	The Year of the Stork	1x30 min	Documentary following a family of storks in northern Germany produced by the RSPB.	Narrator
1990	Ocean World	1x90 min	Environmental musical - story of a female humpback whale as she journeys to her northern feeding grounds. Work of chorus, soloists, narrator, and stage and transmitted as part of Channel 4's Fragile Earth series.	Presenter
1990	The Media Show	1x50 min	Episode: "Natural History". The show is presented by Emma Freud.	On-screen participant
1990	NHNZ – Wild South. Grandma: the Oldest Albatross	1x50 min	Documentary about "Grandma" who was the matriarch of the Northern Royal Albatross colony at Taiaroa Head. She was the oldest banded bird at that time with an estimated age of sixty years.	Narrator
1991	Lime Grove – The Television Years	-	BBC's Lime Grove Studio.	Interviewee
1991	Barn Owl: Bird of Darkness	1x30 min	Documentary exploring the private life of a pair of Barn Owls	Narrator
1991	Close Up on Wildlife	1x46 min	A behind-the-scenes look at natural history filming by Jim Frazier and Densey Clyne.	Introduction
1992	BBC2 Goes Colour – 25 Anniversary	1x15 min	BBC documentary about introduction of colour TV.	Introduction
1992	Eagles: The Majestic Hunters	1x60 min	Documentary about eagles on five continents.	Narrator
1993	Wildlife 100	-	On the occasion of the 100th episode of Wildlife on One, Attenborough selected his 12 favourite episodes from the series.	Narrator
1993	Flying with Dinosaurs	-	Attenborough examines living reptiles, bats, and birds to discover answers about flight. BBC series.	Narrator
1993	Joan Bakewell's – "Memento"	1x25 min	Attenborough presents a number of mementos that are dear to him.	Narrator
1993	Portrait Painter to the Birds	1x30 min	The work of William Cooper and his painting of Paradise Birds. BBC series.	Narrator
1993	K: Kenneth Clark 1903–1983	-	Documentary about the life of Kenneth Clark.	Guest interviewee
1994	Call My Bluff	1x29 min	A celebratory reboot one off episode of Call My Bluff for the 30th birthday of BBC Two.	Introduction
1995	Heroes of Comedy	-	Episode: "Joyce Grenfell". BBC series.	Interviewee
1995	Spirits of the Forest and Year of the Gagadju	2x27 min	Spirits of the Forest looks at the Birds of Paradise in Papua New Guinea and the unique relationship they have with the highlanders. The people believe they gain the special qualities of the birds by wearing their feathers in ceremonies. This episode was written by Attenborough. Year of the Gagadju looks at Kakadu as the traditional homeland of the Gagadju tribe. This is an account of how they divide the year into six seasons, reading the changes around them. The Gagadju are determined that their traditional culture will not be lost for future generations. Both programmes are narrated by Sandy Gore.	Writer
1995	Himself and Other Animals – Tribute to Gerald Durrell	1x60 min	Documentary about the life of British naturalist Gerald Durrell.	Interviewee
1995	Pebble Mill at One	1x37 min	Interview with Alan Titchmarsh. David is joined by Tim Shepherd for a section of the interview.	Interviewee
1995–1996	David Attenborough's World of Wildlife (VHS compilations)	-	Not original programming. VHS compilation of various Wildlife on One episodes. More than 10 VHS releases including "Fox and Wildcat", "Great Apes", "Great White Shark", "Sea Otters and Elephant Seals", "Meerkats United", "Peacocks and Budgerigars", "African Big Cats", "African Elephants", "Underwater Wonderlands", "Incredible Suckers", "Raccoons and Kangaroos".	Narrator
1995–2007	BBC Wildlife Specials	22x50 min	List of specials narrated by Attenborough: "Great White Shark: The True Story of Jaws", "Polar Bear: The Arctic Warrior", "Crocodile: The Smiling Predator", "Leopard: The Agent of Darkness", "Eagle: The Master of the Skies", "Humpback Whale: The Giant of the Oceans", "Wolf: The Legendary Outlaw", "Tiger: The Elusive Princess", "Lions: Spy in the Den", "Grizzly: Face to Face", "Gorillas: On the Trail of King Kong", "Serpent: Through the Eyes of the Snake", "Killer Whale", "Elephants: Spy in the Herd", "Smart Sharks: Swimming with Roboshark", "Bears: Spy in the Woods", "Trek: Spy on the Wildebeest", "Tiger: Spy in the Jungle".	Narrator
1996	The Secret Life of Seahorses	1x45 min	Breeding seahorses.	Narrator
1996	Menuhin at 80	1x120 min	Documentary on life of Yehudi Menuhin with concert by Royal Philharmonic Orchestra.	Presenter
1996	Reputations	1x55 min	The life of Joy Adamson is re-examined. Attenborough is interviewed in the episode: "Born Wild".	Interviewee
1996	Auntie's All-Time Greats	1x120 min	BBC series.	
1996	Natural History Night	-	BBC show.	Introduction and host
1996	Lost Wilderness	-	Traces the history of the modern wilderness conservation movement and visits the species that survive today as a result of its efforts.	Narrator
1996	Break the Science Barrier	1x52 min	Richard Dawkins talks about the value of scientific endeavour.	Guest interviewee
1997	Auntie – the Inside Story of the BBC	4x60 min	Four part documentary series on the development of BBC.	Guest interviewee
1997	Natural History Night	-	Show on filming nature documentaries.	Guest interviewee
1997	Salmon Against the Tides	1x60 min	By John Macnish for BBC/Discovery.	Presenter
1997	The Oral History of the BBC	1x58 min	Part of BBC - Oral History Collection initiated by Frank Gillard in 1972, interview date: 9 January 1997	Interviewee
1998	The Greats – Champions of Nature	2x55 min	The first episode is dedicated to the work of Attenborough and the second episode also has Attenborough-related content. The series is narrated by Simon King.	Archive footage
1999	Animal People – Octopus Hunter	-		Narrator
1999	Kingdoms of Survival	-	ITV series. Episode: "Tigers Next Door".	Narrator

=== 2000s ===
Year	Title	Duration	Subject	Credit(s)
2000	Wilderness Men	3x45 min	Attenborough comments in the episode about Alexander von Humboldt.	Interviewee
2000	My Generation	3x45 min	BBC2 series by Joan Bakewell - Attenborough participates in the episode "Into the Light".	Guest interviewee
2000	40 years of Television Centre – Night of a Thousand Shows	1x70 min	40th anniversary of the BBC Television Centre.	Guest interviewee
2001	Secrets of the Screen	1x30 min	Conservation of 18th-century Japanese folding screen that was painted by Utagawa Toyoharu.	Guest interviewee
2001	Flying Casanovas	1x53 min	The courtship of various bird species.	Narrator
2001	A Window on the World	-	BBC series.	Guest interviewee
2001	The Human Face	4x60 min	BBC series.	Guest interviewee
2001	The Ultimate Wild Paradises – The Top Ten Destinations	-	BBC series.	Guest interviewee
2002	Attenborough: The Controller Years	1x45 min	The work of Attenborough as BBC Two Controller.	Guest interviewee
2002	Attenborough in Conversation with Mark Lawson	1x30 min		Guest interviewee
2002	The Indispensables	-	Radio show by Lynne Truss. Development of colour TV.	Guest interviewee
2002	Reading the Decades	-	Best-selling books through the decades. Attenborough in episode "Reading 50s". The series was presented by Stephen Fry.	Guest interviewee
2002	Robbie the Reindeer in Legend of the Lost Tribe	1x30 min	A half-hour special for BBC/Comic Relief.	Voice
2002-2026	Nature	22x60 min		Narrator and presenter
2003	Great Wildlife Moments	-		Archive footage
2003	The Ancient Forests	1x5 min		Narrator
2003	Hands on History: Conserving the Dark Age Legacy of Sutton Hoo	1x30 min	Documentary on artifacts found at the Sutton Hoo archaeological site and the delicate conservation process done by the British Museum's curators.	Narrator
2003	On The Brink	1x34 min	Film about the endangered species of New South Wales, Australia.	Presenter and narrator
2003	The Many Lives of Richard Attenborough	-	Richard Attenborough's work on various films and the Oscar-winning Gandhi.	Interviewee
2003	Deep Blue	1x90 min	Theatrical version of the 2001 BBC nature documentary series The Blue Planet.	Self
2004	William Hodges: The Art of Exploration	1x35 min	William Hodges who accompanied Captain Cook on his voyages in the Pacific.	Presenter
2004	RSPB Awash with Birds	1x49 min	A look at the 300 birds species found at Titchwell Marsh and Snettisham nature reserve.	Narrator
2004	RSPB The Minsmere Year	1x60 min	Filmed entirely on location at the reserve by Hugh Maynard.	Narrator
2004	What's the Point of the BBC?	-	BBC Panorama series debating the future of the BBC.	Guest interviewee
2004	The Truth about the 60's TV	1x60 min	Mark Lawson questions the received wisdom that the 1960s were the zenith of British television.	Guest interviewee
2004	Ospreys – Flying Home to Rutland Water	1x50 min	The story of the comeback of the osprey in Rutland Water and around England.	Narrator
2004	The Way We Went Wild	3x50 min	Three-part series first shown on BBC Two about British wildlife presenters, narrated by Josette Simon. Attenborough is featured in the first two episodes.	Guest interviewee
2004	Happy Birthday BBC Two	1x180 min	First broadcast on BBC Two on 20 April 2004 to commemorate the channel's 40th birthday. The film was broadcast again from 16 to 24 April 2014 for the channel's 50th birthday in 2014.	Guest interviewee
2004	The Michael Faraday Lecture	1x68 min	Lecture titled 'Perception, Deception & Reality', given after Royal Society of London awarded Attenborough the Michael Faraday Prize	Lecturer
2004	Better Butterflies	1x72 min	Introduction from Sir David Attenborough and narrated by Barry Paine. By Richard Brock and Gareth Trezise.	Presenter
2005	The Selfish Green	1x60 min	Attenborough participates in a discussion of environmental issues.	Interviewee
2005	The Wild Life of Gerald Durrell	1x60 min	BBC series.	Interviewee
2005	Sport in the Sixties: A TV Revolution	1x60 min	A look at the way technology revolutionized BBC TV's coverage of sport in the 1960s.	Interviewee
2005	How Art Made the World	5x60 min	A BBC documentary series looking at the influence of art on our society.	Guest presenter
2005	BBC's Play It Again – Panel Game	1x30 min	A BBC documentary looking at various panel games broadcast on TV.	Guest presenter
2005	BBC's Timeshift – The Lost Road – Overland to Singapore	1x40 min	The travels of six Oxbridge undergraduates from London to Singapore.	Guest interviewee
2005	The 50 Greatest Documentaries	1x150 min	Directed by Garry John Hughes and Elaine Shepherd.	Guest presenter
2005	Coiba: A Savage Paradise	-	Coiba National Park, off the Pacific coast of Panama, is spotlighted with an emphasis on Coiba Island, the largest part of the park and its fragile ecosystem that remains intact due to a penal colony established in 1910.	Narrator
2006	Masterpieces of the British Museum	6x30 min	Attenborough contributes in "The Durer Rhinoceros" and "Head of an Ife King from Nigeria".	Guest interviewee
2006	Nation on Film - "Kearton's Wildlife"	1x30 min	Episode on the life of British naturalist and animal photographer Cherry Kearton.	Interviewee
2006	Gilbert White: The Nature Man	1x60 min	The life and work of 18th-century English naturalist Gilbert White.	On-screen participant
2006	Suez: A Very British Crisis	3x58 min	Attenborough describes his contacts with Anthony Eden during Suez Canal crisis. He contributes to episodes "Betrayal" and "War".	Guest interviewee
2006	Folk Britannia	3x58 min	Attenborough is interviewed in the first episode "Ballads & Blues".	Guest interviewee
2006	War On Science	1x49 min		Archive footage
2006	Planet Earth: The Future	3x60 min	Companion to the Planet Earth series. Episodes: "Saving Species", "Into the Wilderness", "Living Together".	Interviewee
2006	Favourite Attenborough Moments	2x67 min	The format consisted of two programmes 1) "My Favourite Attenborough Moment". Celebrity admirers of Attenborough's work introduced a shortlist of 20 highlights from his nature documentaries and advocated their particular favourites. 2) "Your Favourite Attenborough Moment", counted down the same 20 clips in the order of votes received from the viewers. Featured interviews with Attenborough in which he described the experiences of filming them.	
2006	Video Fish Book, Volume 1	1x60 min	Produced by Vision Earth Society, David Haylock, Director.	Narrator
2006	CEPSAR lecture	1x67 min	Attenborough's CEPSAR lecture entitled "Life in the Undergrowth", Berrill Lecture Theatre.	Speaker
2006–2018	BBC Breakfast	-	7 episodes in the time period each having segments about 10 min	Interviewee
2007	BBC's Sharing Planet Earth	-	Episode 1 of BBC series Saving Planet Earth: Running Wild. The series has 11 episodes in total (9 + 2 live shows).	Presenter
2007	100 Years of Wildlife Films	1x120 min	Bill Oddie highlights pioneering filmmakers.	Guest presenter
2007	BBC's Peter Scott: a Passion for Nature	-	A documentary on the life and work of naturalist Peter Scott.	Narrator and presenter
2007	BBC's Watching Desmond Morris	1x60 min	Documentary about the zoologist/anthropologist Desmond Morris.	Narrator and guest interviewee
2007	Joseph Rotblat Lecture "Watching the Wild"	-	Delivered at Hay Festival 2007 WMD Awareness organisation.	Speaker
2007	BBC's Silbury: The Heart of the Hill	1x60 min	The archaeological excavations of the Silbury Hill Mound.	Guest interviewee
2007	BBC's Demob Happy: How TV Conquered Britain	1x67 min	The development of broadcasting in Great Britain after WWII.	Guest interviewee
2008	BBC's Fossil Detectives	8x29 min	Episode 1: "Central England", Episode 2: "London".	Guest interviewee
2008	NOVA's Lord of the Ants	1x53 min	Documentary on the work of naturalist E.O. Wilson.	Guest interviewee
2008	BBC2 – The Great British Parakeet Invasion	1x9 min	A short BBC documentary about the introduced parakeet population in southeastern England.	Guest interviewee
2008	BBC's Art of Arts TV	3x60 min	Narrated by Suzy Klein, three-part series about contribution that arts programmes have made to national broadcasting culture.	Guest interviewee
2008	BBC's The Duke: A Portrait of Prince Philip	1x90 min	A biography of Prince Philip, Duke of Edinburgh, husband of Queen Elizabeth II.	Guest interviewee
2009	BBC Horizon, "How Many People Can Live On Planet Earth?"	1x59 min	In a Horizon special, Attenborough investigates whether the world is heading for a population crisis. He examines whether it is the duty of individuals to commit not only to smaller families but to change the way they live for the sake of humanity and planet Earth.	Presenter
2009	Carnyx Wild, The Great Bustard	1x8 min	The reintroduction of the Great Bustard into Great Britain.	Narrator
2009	The Funny Side of Animals	1x60 min	BBC series by Clive Anderson.	Guest interviewee
2009	An Oral History of Media and Archaeology	1x90 min	2009 Panel – "Archaeology and TV". Filmed by The Personal Histories Project, University of Cambridge, Babbage Lecture Theatre.	Co-presenter
2009	BBC's Timeshift – Archaeology: Digging the Past	1x59 min		Guest interviewee
2009	BBC's The Story of the Open University	1x49 min		Guest interviewee

=== 2010s ===
Year	Title	Duration	Subject	Credit(s)
2010	BBC's Horizon Death of Oceans	1x59 min		Presenter
2010	Lophelia's Cold Water Corals	1x5 min	Short documentary about cold water corals.	Narrator
2010	Symphony of Science	20x4 min	Attenborough is track 4 called "The Unbroken Thread". He also appears in: "Children of Africa" (2011), "The Greatest Show on Earth" (2012) and "Our Biggest Challenge" (2012).	Participant
2010	BBC's Genius of Britain	5x60 min	Documentary series about famous British scientists. Episodes: "The First Five", "A Roomful of Brilliant Minds", "The Lights Come On", "Out of the Darkness", "Asking Big Questions". Attenborough contributed pieces on Christopher Wren and Joseph Banks in episodes 1 and 2 and conclusions in episode 5.	Guest presenter
2010	BBC's Attenborough's Journey	1x60 min	Attenborough presents anecdotes from his work on various documentaries.	Presenter
2010	BBC's Delia through the Decades	5x30 min	Documentary series on cooking. Attenborough contributes in the second episode.	Interviewee
2010	BBC's The Born Free Legacy	1x60 min	Documentary commemorating the 50th anniversary of Joy Adamson's book Born Free.	Guest interviewee
2010	BBC's Mad and Bad: 60 Years of Science on TV	1x90 min	The various science programmes on TV in the UK.	Guest interviewee
2010	BBC's Museum of Life	5x60 min	Attenborough contributes in episodes "A Museum in a Modern World" and "A collection for the Future".	Guest interviewee
2010	BBC's Timeshift – When Britain Went Wild	1x90 min	Timeshift episode on how wildlife gained importance with British public during the 1960s.	Guest interviewee
2010	BBC's Birds Britannia	4x60 min	Wild birds in Great Britain.	Interviewee
2010	BBC's Jane Goodall: Beauty and the Beasts	1x60 min	The work of Jane Goodall with chimps at Gombe.	Guest interviewee
2010	Beyond the Brink	1x42 min	A short documentary made by Ross Harrison based on his investigations on climate change.	Guest interviewee
2010	BBC's Culture Show Special – A History of the World	1x60 min	The story of human development through a list of 100 objects held at the British Museum. Attenborough presents a small segment.	Presenter
2010	The Attenborough – Fortey talk "What's in a name?"	1x83 min	Attenborough and Prof. Richard Fortey presented a lecture celebrating the work of the International Commission on Zoological Nomenclature (ICZN) at Ondaatje Theatre of the Royal Geographical Society	On-screen participant
2011	PBS Nature, Elsa's Legacy – The Born Free Story	1x53 min	Documentary about the life of lioness Elsa and the impact of her story on wildlife conservation.	Guest interviewee
2011	BBC's Great Thinkers: In Their Own Words	3x59 min	Attenborough contributes in the episodes "The Culture Wars" and "Human All Too Human".	Guest commentator
2011	Ocean Drifters – A Secret World beneath the Waves	1x16 min	A short documentary about plankton written, produced and directed by Dr Richard Kirby from Plymouth University.	Narrator
2011	What a Wonderful World	1x60 min		Narrator
2011	BBC's Brave New World	5x49 min	Episodes: "Machines", "Health", "Technology", "Environment", "Biology". In episode "Environment": At Longleat, Attenborough helps collect the DNA of an elephant for the Frozen Ark – a project to save all the world's species from extinction. Attenborough also introduces the work of the Millennium Seed Bank.	Guest interviewee and presenter
2011	BBC's Ceramics: A Fragile History	3x60 min	Documentary about development of ceramics. Attenborough is in episodes "The Art of the Potter" and "The Story of Clay".	Guest interviewee
2011	Animal Planet's A City of Wild Cats	1x11 min	Short documentary on the cats living on Rome streets.	Narrator
2011	BBC's The Secrets of Scott's Hut	1x90 min	The Antarctic expedition of Robert Falcon Scott.	Guest interviewee
2011	Atlantic Productions The Bachelor King	1x75 min	A 3D documentary about King Penguins.	Writer and presenter
2012	BBC's The Grammar School: A Secret History	2x60 min	Documentary about the work of Grammar Schools in the 1950s and 1960s.	Guest interviewee
2012	BBC's Culture Show – John Craxton	1x60 min	Attenborough comments the work of British painter John Craxton.	Guest interviewee
2012	BBC's Plants Behaving Badly	2x60 min	Documentary about plants.	Guest interviewee
2012	BBC's Tales of Television Centre	1x90 min	The history of the BBC's Television Centre building.	Presenter
2013	When Björk Met Attenborough	1x30 min		Co-presenter
2013	BBC's Goodbye Television Centre	1x130 min	Documentary about the BBC production facility, Television Centre.	Guest
2013	BBC's The Early Years	1x29 min		Guest interviewee
2013	BBC's Bill Bailey's Jungle Hero	2x60 min	Bill Bailey introduces naturalist Alfred Russel Wallace, contemporary of Charles Darwin and independent discoverer of the mechanics of natural selection and biological evolution. Attenborough appears in episodes: "In Borneo" and "In the Spice Islands".	Guest interviewee
2013	BBC's Benjamin Britten on Camera	1x60 min	Documentary about the co-operation of Benjamin Britten and the BBC.	Guest interviewee
2013	The Forgotten Story of Alfred Russel Wallace	1x5 min	On the 100th anniversary of Wallace's death, Attenborough tells the story of the explorer.	Writer and narrator
2013	BBC's Edwardian Insects on Film	1x60 min	British naturalist Percy Smith, who in 1908 filmed The Acrobatic Fly.	Guest interviewee
2013	Wallace and the Birds of Paradise	1x60 min	Sixth Hadyn Ellis Distinguished lecture. Work of Welsh naturalist Alfred Russel Wallace. Cardiff University.	Presenter
2013	The Dream of Perfection	1x90 min	Documentary about lost and found film Autopsy on a Dream	Guest interviewee
2013	Sir David Attenborough and Anthony Geffen: Meet the Developer	1x45 min	Original Apple podcast about App and show Natural History Museum Alive	Interviewee
2014	The Folio Society's For the Love of Books	1x15 min	Attenborough talks about his love of books.	Presenter
2014	Craghoppers Hope	1x15 min	Documentary about the work of the Dian Fossey Gorilla Fund International to protect mountain gorillas.	Narrator
2014	BBC's All About Two	-	The development of BBC2.	Guest interviewee
2014	Channel 4's Richard Attenborough: A Life	1x60 min	The life and work of Sir Richard Attenborough.	Guest interviewee
2014	Sir Joseph Banks Society's Sir Joseph Banks – Endeavour	1x12 min	Attenborough talks about the life and work of Joseph Banks and his travels with Captain Cook.	Presenter
2014	BBC's 50 Golden Years of Sport on BBC Two	-	Sue Barker presents 50 years of sport coverage on BBC Two.	Guest interviewee
2014	NHK's Legends of the Deep: Deep Sea Sharks	1x50 min	Japanese scientists studying deep sea sharks of the coast of Japan.	Narrator
2014	A Culture Show Special: Sir Kenneth Clark: Portrait of a Civilised Man	1x60 min	This Culture Show looks at the life of Sir Kenneth Clark, one of the most influential people in 20th-century British art.	Guest interviewee
2014	University of Illinois film Windows on a Lost World	6x30 min	Documentary about a major collection of amber from the Dominican Republic located at the University of Illinois Urbana-Champaign. A grasshopper fossil found in this amber was named after Attenborough.	Narrator
2014	Lincoln School of Media Sir Joseph Banks – Endeavour	1x12 min	Short documentary about Sir Joseph Banks.	Guest presenter
2014	BBC's Pop Goes BBC Two	1x90 min	Documentary that reviews 50 years of popular music on BBC Two. Attenborough introduces the film.	Narrator
2014	Birdman – The Art of William T. Cooper	1x29 min	About William T. Cooper. Shown on the Australian channel ABC.	Guest interviewee
2015	Society of Biology Biology – Changing the World	1x14 min	Attenborough is interviewed for Biology: Changing the World and discusses various topics, such as, what sparked his interest in the natural world, to the role biologists play in today's society.	Guest interviewee
2015	BBC's When President Barack Obama met Sir David Attenborough	1x35 min	The meeting that took place between President Obama and Attenborough.	Guest interviewee
2015	RTS Huw Wheldon Memorial Lecture: Public Service Broadcasting – A House of Cards?	1x45 min	Baron Michael Dobbs examines UK's public service broadcasting and asks will public service broadcasters will continue to play an important role in culture and society in the future.	Guest interviewee
2015	Eden TV's Wild Canada	4x42 min	The wildlife of Canada. Episodes: "The Wild West", "Ice Edge", "The Heartland", "The Eternal Frontier".	Narrator
2015	BBC's VE Day: Remembering Victory	1x100 min	Commemorating the 70th anniversary of VE Day with contribution from leading British personalities, including Attenborough.	Guest interviewee
2015	WLT's Orchids of Baños	1x5 min	Attenborough introduces the work of World Land Trust (WLT) and its partner in Ecuador, the Fundacion Ecominga, to protect the micro orchids of Ecuador. These are some of the tiniest plant species on Earth, which are found high in the Andean cloud forests of central Ecuador.	On-screen participant
2015	Cougars Undercover – Big Cat Week	1x45 min	Two mountain lion mothers raising their cubs outside Jackson Hole. Season 6 Episode 13	Narrator
2016	A Plastic Ocean	1x104 min	Documentary on the effects of pollution by plastic waste on world oceans.	Guest interviewee
2016	Sky's Attenborough at 90: Behind the Lens	1x45 min	Documentary for Attenborough's 90th birthday. Shot over the period of seven years, shows what it is like to be on the road with him during filming.	Guest interviewee
2016	BBC's Attenborough at 90	1x58 min	In celebration of his 90th birthday, Attenborough shares extraordinary highlights of his life and career with broadcaster Kirsty Young.	Guest interviewee
2016	BBC's Zoo Quest in Colour	1x89 min	Documentary based on original Zoo Quest films in colour that were rediscovered in BBC archive in 2016.	Guest interviewee
2016	BBC's Cue the Queen: Celebrating the Christmas Speech	1x58 min	Documentary on the Royal Christmas Broadcasts.	Guest interviewee
2016	ECO2's Grindahvalur	1x29 min	Documentary on the changing relation of Faroe Islanders towards whaling of the Long-finned pilot whale (Globicephala melas) or "Grindahvalur". Attenborough makes the introductory remarks.	On-screen participant
2016	NHK's Deep Ocean	3x56 min	Episodes: "The Lost World of the Pacific", "Lights in the Abyss", "Descent into the Mariana Trench".	Narrator
2016	UNEnvironment.org's The Hole	1x5 min	Short documentary on the Montreal Protocol.	Narrator
2016	The Hole: How Ronnie and Maggie Saved the World	1x7 min	How Ronald Reagan and Margaret Thatcher had key roles in the Montreal Protocol.	Narrator
2016	Video Encyclopedia of Caribbean Fish, Vol.1	1x60 min	Overview of over 75 species of fish and marine animals from the Caribbean, Florida and the Bahamas. Updated and extended version of Video Fish Book (2006).	Narrator
2017	Richmond Park – National Nature Reserve	1x21 min	London's Richmond Park.	Presenter
2017	In Search of Arcadia	1x59 min		Guest interviewee
2017	South Africa – Eastern Great Escarpment	1x21 min	The protection of the Eastern Great Escarpment.	Narrator
2017	BBC Horizon's Dippy and the Whale	1x59 min	Documentary about the replacement of Dippy the Dinosaur exhibit at the Natural History Museum.	Narrator
2017	ABC's Into Hot Water	1x25 min	The effect of global warming on the Great Barrier Reef.	Guest interviewee
2017	Sir David Attenborough: Canada House	1x60 min	In conversation with Dan Snow.	Interviewee
2018	Living Thames	1x60 min	Attenborough introduces this documentary on the River Thames.	On screen participant
2018	Terra Mater Factual Studios - Dragons and Damsels	1x50 min	Documentary about dragonflies.	Narrator
2018	Terra Mater Factual Studios - Whale Wisdom	1x50 min	A documentary about whales.	Narrator
2019	Pace Brothers Year of the Salmon	1x3 min	The plight of the salmon.	
2019	Queen Elizabeth II: Legacy to the Natural World	1x44 min	Queen Elizabeth II launches a project to create a global network of protected forests.	Narrator
2019	WWF International How to Save Our Planet	8x8 min	The state of Earth.	
2019	WWF International Our Planet Our Business	1x38 min	Short documentary.	On screen participant
2019	Earth Stories - "Garden in the Sky"	6x29 min	Meet the ecologists and educators of Hong Kong's 60-year-old NGO, Kadoorie Farm and Botanic Garden, and learn about their different conservation efforts taking place near one of the most densely populated cities on earth.	Narrator
2019	Diving Deep: The Life and Times of Mike deGruy	1x83 min	Documentary about the filmmaker and underwater cameraman Mike deGruy.	Guest interviewee
2019	War on Plastic	3x58 min	Documentary about plastic waste, with Hugh Fearnley-Whittingstall and Anita Rani. Attenborough participates in the last (third) episode of the series.	On screen participant
2019	The Kiwi The Knight The Qashqai	1x47 min	A New Zealand woman's love of an Iranian tribe and their dying art and culture leads to a surprise invitation from Attenborough.	Guest interviewee
2019	The Durrells in Corfu, What the Durrells Did Next	1x47 min	A PBS Masterpiece Special episode. Hosted by Keeley Hawes as an accompanying documentary for ITV's series The Durrells.	Guest interviewee
2019	Gardening Australia	1x60 min	Series 30, Episode 23 - Has a section when Peter Cundall meets Attenborough from an earlier episode of same programme	Guest interviewee
2019	Hunt for the Giant Squid	1x45 min	National Geographic special following marine biologists deep into the icy waters of Antarctica in search of mysterious giants that manage to survive in this hostile place	Narrator
2019–2024	Whitley Awards	-	Narrator of short video clips produced for ceremony	Narrator

=== 2020s ===
Year	Title	Duration	Subject	Credit(s)
2020	BBC - The Romantics and Us	1x60 min	Simon Schama explores the enduring and powerful legacy the Romantics have left on our modern world. Attenborough participates in episode: "The Chambers of the Mind".	On-screen participant
2020	BBC Horizon - 7.7 Billion People and Counting	1x60 min	Documentary by Chris Packham.	On-screen participant
2020	BBC - Deep Ocean: Giants of the Antarctic Deep	1x60 min		Narrator
2020	BBC - Travels of a Lifetime	6x60 min	Documentary on Michael Palin's travels. Episodes: "Around the World in 80 Days", "Pole to Pole", "Full Circle", "Sahara", "Himalaya Part 1" and "Himalaya Part 2".	On screen participant
2020	BBC - Planet Earth: A Celebration	1x58 min		On screen participant
2020	Netflix - David Attenborough: A Life on Our Planet	1x83 min		Narrator
2020	BBC - Meerkat: A Dynasties Special	1x58 min	Follows the survival of a plucky meerkat family living in the harsh beauty of the Makgadikgadi salt pans.	Narrator
2020	Richard Batterham – Master Potter	1x31 min	A The Joanna Bird Foundation film	Guest interviewee
2020	VE Day 75: The People's Celebration	1x70 min	An evening of memories and music to honour and celebrate the Second World War generation	Guest interviewee
2020	Kingdom of Plants VR	3x5 min	Three parts VR 180 series from Alchemy Immersive and Meta Quest based on the Kingdom of Plants series.	Narrator
2020	First Life VR	1x11 min	VR 180 film from Alchemy Immersive and Meta Quest based on the First Life documentary.	Narrator
2020	Micro Monsters VR	5x5 min	Five part VR 180 film series from Alchemy Immersive and Meta Quest based on the Micro Monsters documentary.	Narrator
2021	Apple - The Year Earth Changed	1x60 min	Showcasing exclusive footage from around the world after an unprecedented year, The Year Earth Changed is a timely documentary special that takes a fresh new approach to the global lockdown and the uplifting stories that have come out of it.	Narrator
2021	Listening Through the Lens	1x60 min	A film about the pioneering career of Christopher Nupen, who founded one of the first independent production companies in the 1960s, at the dawn of the music documentary era.	On-screen participant
2021	Prince Philip – Man Behind the Crown	1x60 min		On-screen participant
2021	Sky Nature - David Attenborough's Global Adventure	4x60 min	Featuring previously unseen footage of some of the greatest filming sequences of Attenborough's series. (E1 ∙ Attenborough's Global Adventure - Feb 12, 2022, E2 ∙ Home Planet - Feb 19, 2022, E3 ∙ The Rise of Nature - Feb 26, 2022, E4 ∙ Attenborough's Global Adventure Pt.2 - May 13, 2023)	On-screen participant
2021	Attenborough and The Mammoth Graveyard	1x60 min	Documentary about Britain's biggest Mammoth discovery in almost 20 years near Swindon and its archaeological excavation.	Presenter
2021	David Attenborough's First Life	1x11 min	Short video - VR media production for oculus platform by Atlantic Productions' Alchemy Immersive (Note: Not to be confused with 2 part 2010 show from BBC)	Narrator
2022	Attenborough's Wonder of Song	1x59 min	Attenborough chooses seven of the most remarkable animal songs found in nature and explores the significance of these songs in the lives of their species.	Presenter
2022	How the BBC Began	3x89 min	TV mini-series documentary of BBC's early history. 3 episodes: "Accident and Opportunity", "Building the Audience", "Shooting the Rapids".	Guest interviewee
2022	Elizabeth: A Portrait in Parts	1x90 min	British documentary film about Queen Elizabeth II. The film was directed by Roger Michell.	Guest interviewee
2022	NHK Satoyama	2x52 min	Episodes: "Niigata: Living with Snow", "Aso: Living with a Volcano".	Writer and narrator for English version
2022	Winterwatch	1x60 min	Series 11 Episode 8. A 14-minute interview section within the episode. Chris Packham interviews Attenborough.	Guest interviewee
2022	When the Queen Spoke to the Nation	1x60 min	Directed by Minoo Bhatia. Attenborough appears in a section as himself.	On-screen participant
2022	The Queen: 70 Glorious Years	1x60 min	Directed by Mark Bates.	Guest interviewee
2022	Conquest of the Skies VR	3x6 min	Attenborough takes you on an awe-inspiring journey through the evolution of flight in the VR 180 docuseries from Alchemy Immersive and Meta Quest	Narrator
2022	Hey Duggee	1x4 min	Sir David Attenborough made a guest appearance in a special episode of Hey Duggee, assisting the Squirrels in their quest to earn The Green Planet Badge. This brief episode was released concurrently with his BBC documentary series, The Green Planet.	Narrator
2023	Climate Crisis – "Drought"	1x49 min	S01E01: Extreme drought conditions and their effects on livelihoods around the globe	Guest interviewee
2023	Galapagos VR	3x7 min	Three part VR 180 series from Alchemy Immersive and Meta Quest.	Narrator
2024	Attenborough and the Giant Sea Monster	1x60 min	A fossil of a giant prehistoric Jurassic predator is discovered and Attenborough discusses it.	Presenter
2024	David Attenborough: A Life On Earth	1x50 min	The story of Attenborough and how he became the voice of natural history programmes.	On-screen participant
2024	Secret Lives of Orangutans	1x79 min	Discover the life of a multi-generational orangutan family in the Sumatran treetops through drone footage.	Narrator
2024	Back to Camp 41	1x24 min	Directed by Greg Hemmings, documentary about Dr. Thomas Lovejoy.	
2025	Ocean with David Attenborough	1x95 min	The film debuted in cinemas in 2025, before premiering globally on National Geographic and streaming on Disney+ and Hulu.	Presenter
2025	Deep Ocean: Kingdom of the Coelacanth	1x60 min	An expedition team carry out deep sea exploration in the waters off Sulawesi in search of the mysterious coelacanth	Narrator
2026	Wild London	1x60 min	Documentary about London's diverse wildlife	Narrator and presenter
2026	A Gorilla Story: Told by David Attenborough	1x77min	Attenborough reminisces about his encounter with mountain gorillas in 1978 and reveals the story of their descendants	Narrator and presenter
2026	Making Life on Earth: Attenborough’s Greatest Adventure	1x60 min	A retrospective look back at the making of Life on Earth; featuring new interviews with David Attenborough and members of the original crew.	Guest interviewee
2026	David Attenborough's 100 Years on Planet Earth	1x90 min	Concert from the Royal Albert Hall; celebrating David Attenborough’s 100th birthday and his remarkable career.	On-screen participant
2026	Our Story with David Attenborough	1x5min	An immersive 5 minute experience at the National History Museum, with Attenborough recording celebrating his 100th birthday. and then in October it moved to Chester Zoo for 17 October 2026 - 31 January 2027	Presenter

== Web ==
Year	Title	Role	Notes
2026	What Has The BBC Ever Done for Me?	Himself	

== See also ==
- David Attenborough bibliography

== Sources ==
- David Attenborough, Life on Air, BBC Books, 2002
- David Attenborough filmography at the BFI Film and TV Database
- David Attenborough filmography at IMDb.com
- BBC Genome
