= The Lost Gods of Easter Island =

2000 BBC documentary

- Genre: Documentary
- Written by: David Attenborough
- Narrated by: David Attenborough
- Country of origin: United Kingdom
- Original language: English

Original release
- Release: 2000

Related
- A Blank on the Map; Bowerbirds: The Art of Seduction; Attenborough in Paradise and Other Personal Voyages

The Lost Gods of Easter Island is a 2000 BBC documentary written and presented by David Attenborough. It explores the history of the civilization of remote Easter Island. It was first transmitted in 2000 and is part of the Attenborough in Paradise and Other Personal Voyages collection of seven documentaries.

Attenborough embarks on a personal quest to uncover the history of a strange wooden figurine carving which he purchased after it turned up in an auction room in New York during the 1980s. It is crafted from wood of the Toromiro tree, Sophora toromiro, now extinct in the wild.

The auction catalogue indicated that the carving was from Easter Island and the auctioneers told him that the sculpture had come from a junk-shop dealer in Pennsylvania. He knew that the, "grotesque head, attached to a body grossly elongated and as thin as a stick," was more important than the auctioneers believed it to be and had such presence and power that he bought it.

He began an investigation to trace the origins of the artifact—an investigation that spans the globe and leads him on voyages to Russia, Australia, England, the Pacific, a Tahiti beach and finally to one of the most remote places on earth; and 15 years later, in a personal detective story that combines art, anthropology, and history traces the origin of the carving and in doing so tells the story of a forgotten civilization and of a people who inhabited one of the most remote places on Earth.

The documentary received positive reviews. The ideas in the documentary are based on an earlier paper by Attenborough.
