= Life on Air =

- Also known as: Life on Air: David Attenborough's 50 Years in Television
- Genre: Documentary
- Presented by: Michael Palin
- Country of origin: United Kingdom
- Original language: English

Production
- Producer: Brian Leith

Original release
- Release: 2002

Related
- The Song of the Earth; The Amber Time Machine; Attenborough in Paradise and Other Personal Voyages

Life on Air: David Attenborough's 50 Years in Television is a BBC documentary film that recounts David Attenborough's television career. It is presented by Michael Palin and produced by Brian Leith.

The BBC first transmitted the documentary in 2002 and is part of the Attenborough in Paradise and Other Personal Voyages collection of 7 documentaries. It includes interviews with Attenborough and several of his former colleagues, along with archival footage.

There is also an autobiographical book of the same title.

== Quotes ==
45 min 10 sec

I often get letters, (and) quite frequently people say how they like the programmes a lot, but I never give credit to the almighty power, that created nature. To which I reply and say, 'It's funny that people, when they say that this is evidence of almighty, always quote beautiful things.' They always quote orchids and hummingbirds, butterflies, roses, but I always have to think too of a little boy sitting on the banks of a river in West Africa who has a worm boring through his eyeball turning him blind before he is five years old, and I reply and say, 'Well, presumably the God you speak about created the worm as well.' And I find that baffling, to credit a merciful God, with that action, and therefore it seems to me safer to show things that I know to be truth, truthful and factual and to allow people to make up their own mind about the moralities of this thing or indeed the theology of this thing.

We made a film about chimps hunting monkeys: that was an extraordinary and powerful and alarming and dismaying thing to see. Again people say, 'How can you put on such savagery, of a predator catching prey? And you are milking it for violence.' If they saw what you put out on the cutting room floor of this animal in suffering – I mean it's a very narrow line that you have to tread, you cannot in my view eliminate it entirely, that is to sentimentalise and to distort reality, but equally some of it is very hard to take, but it's about the reality of what chimps are and we are very close to what chimps are.

55 min 0 sec

I personally can have enough of people leaning out of the television screen and saying, 'You lazy, irresponsible, ignorant chap sitting there in your comfortable suburban home; why don't you care for this or subscribe to that or go out and do the other?' I actually think the best way of taking the message to the people is by showing them the pleasure, not necessarily by saying every time, 'You've got to do something about it,' but by saying, 'Look, isn't this lovely?' and the other bit follows.
