= David Attenborough bibliography =

The following is a chronological list of books written or co-written by Sir David Attenborough. Spanning much of his career, these works range from accounts of his early expeditions to volumes accompanying his landmark natural history programmes, as well as memoirs reflecting on his life and career.

== Main author or significant contributor ==
1. Zoo Quest Books - Zoo Quest to Guiana, Lutterworth (Cambridge, England), 1956, Crowell, 1957, abridged edition, University of London Press (London, England), 1962. aka 'Animal safari to British Guiana Englishmen Hunt Wildlife for B.B.C. Television and the London Zoo Amid Indian Tribes of Tropical South America'
2. Zoo Quest Books - Zoo Quest for a Dragon (1957) - republished in 1959 to include an additional 85 pages from Quest for the Paradise Birds
3. Zoo Quest Books - Zoo Quest in Paraguay (1959)
4. Zoo Quest Books - Quest in Paradise (1960) - an accompaniment to the TV series The People of Paradise and Quest for the Paradise Birds
5. People of Paradise (1960)
6. Zoo Quest Books - Zoo Quest to Madagascar, Lutterworth (Cambridge, England), 1961, published as Bridge to the Past: Animals and People of Madagascar, Harper (New York, NY), 1962
7. Zoo Quest Books - Quest Under Capricorn (1963)
8. My Favourite Stories of Exploration (by various authors). Edited by Attenborough with drawings by Mike Charlton (1964)
9. The World's Wild Places, a Time-Life series volume on Borneo published in 1970, contained a chapter by Attenborough entitled 'Up Mt Kinabalu'
10. Fabulous Animals (1975) - (With Molly Cox) BBC Publications
11. The Tribal Eye (1976), Norton (New York, NY)
12. Deserts and Grasslands: The World's Open Spaces (1980) - by Attenborough (Author), Eric 'John Cloudsley-Thompson' and Duffey (Author)
13. Life on Earth: A Natural History, BBC Publications (London, England), 1979, Little, Brown (Boston, MA), 1980. + Life on Earth: Reader's Digest Augmented and Enlarged Edition, based on original Collins / BBC edition
14. Discovering Life on Earth (1981), Collins
15. Tribal Encounters: An Exhibition of Ethnic Objects Collected by David Attenborough (exhibition catalog), Leicester Museums, Art Galleries, and Records Service, 1981
16. Happiness (1980 Baggs Memorial Lecture), University of Birmingham (Birmingham, England), 1981
17. Journeys to the Past: Travels in New Guinea, Madagascar, and the Northern Territory of Australia, Lutterworth (Cambridge, England), 1981
18. The Zoo Quest Expeditions: Travels in Guyana, Indonesia, and Paraguay(contains Zoo Quest to Guiana, Zoo Quest for a Dragon, and Zoo Quest in Paraguay), Penguin (New York, NY), 1982
19. The Living Planet: A Portrait of the Earth, Little, Brown (Boston, MA), 1984
20. Animal Stories: Tame and Wild (1985) - Michener, James A., Herriot, James, Morris, Desmond, Cousteau, Phillippe, Attenborough (Chapter 'The Komodo Dragon')
21. The First Eden: The Mediterranean World and Man (1987) aka Birth of paradise - Illustrated story Mediterranean (1997) ISBN 4887211791 (Japanese Import)
22. Our World's Heritage (1987) - Javier Perez; Attenborough; Hawkes, Jacquetta; et al. de Cuellar - Publisher. National Geographic Society
23. The Trials of Life (1990), Publisher: Collins / BBC Books
24. The Private Life of Plants: A Natural History of Plant Behaviour (1994)
25. Heart of a Nomad Wilfred Thesiger in Conversation with David Attenborough Paperback – 1994
26. The Life of Birds (1998)
27. The Life of Mammals (2002)
28. Life on Air: Memoirs of a Broadcaster (2002) - autobiography, revised in 2009
29. Life in the Undergrowth (2005)
30. Light On The Earth (Wildlife Photographer of the Year) Hardcover, 2005 - Attenborough (Author)
31. Amazing Rare Things: The Art of Natural History in the Age of Discovery (2007) - by Attenborough (Author), Martin Clayton (Author), Rea Alexandratos (Author), Susan Owens (Author)
32. Life in Cold Blood (2007)
33. David Attenborough's Life Stories (2009)
34. David Attenborough's First Life: A Journey Back in Time With Matt Kaplan (2010)
35. David Attenborough's New Life Stories (2011) aka Life Stories 2
36. Nature Tales: Encounters with Britain's Wildlife (2011) - by Michael Allen (Author), Attenborough (Author), Sonya Patel Ellis (Author)
37. Drawn From Paradise: The Discovery, Art and Natural History of the Birds of Paradise (2012) - by Attenborough (Author), Errol Fuller (Author)
38. David Attenborough's Why Do Birds of Paradise Dance (2012) - Attenborough, Errol Fuller
39. Does My Goldfish Know Who I Am?: And Hundreds More Big Questions from Little People Answered by Experts (2013) - Harris, Gemma Elwin, Knapman, Timothy, Attenborough (Contributor)
40. Why Can't I Tickle Myself?: Big Questions From Little People . . . Answered By Some Very Big People (2013) - Gemma Elwin Harris (Author), Bear Grylls (Contributor), Miranda Hart (Contributor), Attenborough (Contributor)
41. Information Age: Six Networks that Changed Our World (2014) - Tilly Blyth (Editor), Attenborough (Contributor)
42. Adventures of a Young Naturalist: The Zoo Quest Expeditions (2017)
43. Journeys to the Other Side of the World: Further Adventures of a Young Naturalist (2018)
44. Life on Earth 40th Anniversary Edition (2018)
45. Beastly Journeys: Unusual Tales of Travel with Animals (2018) - Dervla Murphy, Attenborough, Jonathan Scott, Gerald Durrell, Mark Shand
46. A Life on Our Planet: My Witness Statement and a Vision for the Future (2020)
47. Living Planet: The Web of Life on Earth A new, fully updated edition of Attenborough's seminal portrait of life on Earth (2021) - Attenborough (Author)
48. Earthshot: How to Save Our Planet (2022) - by Colin Butfield (Author), Jonnie Hughes (Author), HRH Prince William (Introduction), Attenborough (Contributor) and Shakira
49. The Earthshot Prize: A Handbook for Dreamers and Thinkers: Solutions to Repair our Planet (2023) - by Colin Butfield (Author), Jonnie Hughes (Author), HRH Prince William (Introduction), Attenborough (Contributor)
50. Ocean: Earth's Last Wilderness (2025) - by Colin Butfield (Author) Attenborough (Contributor)

== Editor ==
1. New Generation Guide to the birds of Britain and Europe, (Corrie Herring Hooks Series), (1987) - by Christopher Perrins (Author), Attenborough (General Editor), Collins, University of Texas Press (Austin, TX)
2. New Generation Guide to the Wild Flowers of Britain and Northern Europe (1987) - Alastair Fitter, Attenborough (General Editor), Collins, University of Texas Press (Austin, TX)
3. New Generation Guide to the Butterflies and Day-flying Moths of Britain and Europe, 1989 - Michael Chinery, Edited by Attenborough, Illustrated by Brian Hargreaves / University of Texas Press
4. New Generation Guide to the Fungi of Britain and Europe (1989) (Corrie Herring Hooks Series) (Collins New Guides) - Stefan Buczacki (Author), John Wilkinson (Illustrator), Attenborough (General Editor), Collins, University of Texas Press (Austin, TX)
5. The Atlas of the Living World (Marshall Pictorial Atlas S.) (1997), Philip Whitfield (Author), Peter D. Moore (Author), Barry Cox (Author), Attenborough (Editor)

== Foreword, preface and introduction provided to ==
1. Benjamin the 'Zoo Quest' bear - 1957, Charles Lagus (Author), Introduction by Attenborough
2. Thorburn's mammals; with an introduction by Attenborough (1974)
3. Worlds Apart: Nature in Cities and Islands (1976) - Burton, John Andrew and Sparks, John. Attenborough (foreword)
4. Spirit of Asia (1980), Author Michael Macintyre, Introduction by Attenborough
5. Nature Conservation Why and How (1980) - Andrew Ruck (Author), Attenborough (Foreword)
6. To the Farthest Ends of the Earth: 150 Years of World Exploration by the Royal Geographical Society (1980) - Ian Cameron (Author), Attenborough (Foreword)
7. Focus on Nature(1981) - With a foreword by Attenborough, Gerald Thompson, George Bernard, John Cooke (Author)
8. True to Nature: Christopher Parsons looks back on 25 years of wildlife filming with the BBC Natural History Unit (1982) by Christopher Parsons, Attenborough (Foreword)
9. Survival: South Atlantic, 1983 - Cindy Buxton (Author), Annie Price (Author), Attenborough (Foreword)
10. Wildlife through the Camera, by British Broadcasting Corporation, 1982 - Author of introduction. Parkwest Publications (Jersey City, NJ), 1985
11. Andrew Langley, The Making of "The Living Planet," Little Brown (Boston, MA), 1985 - Attenborough (Foreword)
12. The Oxford Dictionary of Natural History (1986) - Allaby, Michael (Editor); Attenborough (Foreword)
13. The Encyclopedia of World Wildlife, by Mark Carwardine, Attenborough (Foreword) (Octopus Publishing, 1986) ISBN 0-7064-2437-9
14. Digging Dinosaurs: The Search That Unraveled the Mystery of Baby Dinosaurs (1988) - John R. Horner; James Gorman; Attenborough (Foreword)
15. Select specimens from nature of the birds, animals &c. 1813 (with commentary by Tim Bonyhady), 1988 - Thomas Skottowe (Author), Attenborough (Foreword) Richard Browne (Illustrator), Tim Bonyhady (Editor)
16. The Last Rain Forests Hardcover (1990) - by Mark Collins (Editor), Attenborough (Introduction)
17. Tomorrow Is Too Late - A Celebration of Our Wildlife Heritage (1990) - Attenborough (Introduction), HRH King Charles III (Foreword)
18. Green Inheritance: World Wild Life Fund Book of Plants (1991), Anthony Huxley (Author), Attenborough (Foreword)
19. Peter Scott: Painter and Naturalist (1994), Elspeth Huxley (Author), Attenborough (Introduction)
20. Wildlife Photographer of the Year (1994) - Helen Gilks (Herausgeber), Peter Wilkinson (Author), Attenborough (Foreword)
21. Visions of a Rainforest: Year in Australia's Tropical Rainforest (1997) by Stanley Breeden (Author), Stanley Greeden (Author), William T. Cooper (Illustrator), Attenborough (Foreword)
22. Wild Fruit by Snowdon (1997), Earl of Antony Armstrong - Jones Snowdon (Author), Penny David (Author), Attenborough (Foreword)
23. Wildlife Specials (1998) - BBC Natural History Unit (Author), Keith Scholey (Editor), Attenborough (Foreword)
24. Gabriele Koch (Ceramics Art Monographs) (1998) - Gabriele Koch (Author), Attenborough (Introduction)
25. Richtersveld: The Enchanted Wilderness (2000) - by Graham Williamson (Photographer, Author, Illustrator), Attenborough (Foreword)
26. The Butterflies of Hampshire (2000) - Oates, Matthew, John Taverner, David Green, Attenborough (Foreword)
27. Travels with the Fossil Hunters (2000) - edited by Peter J. Whybrow, Attenborough (Foreword)
28. Australia's Lost World (Life of the Past co-published with New Holland Publishers Pty. Ltd) (2000) - by Michael Archer (Author), Suzanne Hand (Author), Henk Godthelp (Author), Suzanne J Hand (Author), Attenborough (Foreword)
29. The Blue Planet: A Natural History of the Oceans (2001) - Andrew Byatt, Alastair Fothergill, Martha Holmes, Attenborough (Foreword)
30. Dancing Out of Bali (Periplus Classics Series) (2004) - by John Coast (Author), Attenborough (Foreword)
31. William Hodges 1744–1797: The Art of Exploration, 2004 - Professor Geoff Quilley (Editor), Foreword by Attenborough
32. Planet Earth - As You're Never Seen It Before (2006) - By Alastair Fothergill, Attenborough (Foreword)
33. Grace Wyndham Goldie, First Lady of Television (2006) - John Grist (Author), Attenborough (Foreword)
34. Wild Borneo: The Wildlife and Scenery of Sabah, Sarawak, Brunei and Kalimantan (2006) - by Nick Garbutt (Author, Photographer), J. Cede Prudente (Photographer), Attenborough (Preface)
35. Evolution: Selected Letters of Charles Darwin (2008) - Edited by Frederick Burkhardt, Samantha Evans, and Alison M. Pearn. Foreword by Attenborough
36. Of a Feather: Avian Collective Nouns & Terms of Assembly, Group Names & Associated Terms(2008) - Written, compiled, designed and illustrated with wood engravings by Colin See - Paynton, Attenborough (Foreword)
37. Gabriele Koch - Hand Building and Smoke Firing (2009) - Tony Birks (Author), Attenborough (Foreword)
38. Story of Silbury Hill (2010) - Jim Leary(Author), David Field (Author), Attenborough (Foreword)
39. Silent Summer (2010) - Norman MacLean (Editor) & Attenborough (Foreword)
40. Ernest Thompson Seton: The Life and Legacy of an Artist and Conservationist (2010) - by David L. Witt (Author), Attenborough (Foreword)
41. Food For The Flames, 2011 - David Shaw King (Author); foreword by Attenborough
42. Frozen Planet: A World Beyond Imagination (2011) - Alastair Fothergill (Author), Vanessa Berlowitz (Author), Attenborough (Foreword)
43. John Craxton (2011) - Ian Collins, Attenborough (Foreword)
44. Varilaku: Pacific Arts from the Solomon Islands (2011) - Crispin Howarth (Author), Deborah Waite (Foreword), Attenborough (Foreword)
45. Monograph of the Paradiseidae, or Birds of Paradise, and Ptilonorhynchidae, or Bower-Birds - Folio Society Limited edition (2011) (1,000 copies) - Attenborough (Foreword)
46. Illustrations of birds drawn for John Gould by Edward Lear- Folio Society Limited edition (2012) (780 copies) - Attenborough (Foreword)
47. Alfred Russel Wallace: Letters from the Malay Archipelago (2013) - John van Wyhe (Editor), Kees Rookmaaker (Editor), Attenborough (Foreword)
48. Africa: Eye to Eye with the Unknown (2013) - Michael Bright, Attenborough (Foreword)
49. First Overland: London - Singapore by Land Rover (2016) - by Tim Slessor, Attenborough (Foreword), Antony Barrington Brown (Photographer)
50. Natural History of Edward Lear (2016) - Robert McCracken Peck (Author), Attenborough (Foreword)
51. The Hunt: The Outcome Is Never Certain (2016) - by Alastair Fothergill (Author), Huw Cordey (Author), Attenborough (Foreword)
52. Endeavoring Banks: Exploring Collections from the Endeavour Voyage 1768–1771 (2016) - Neil Chambers, Anna Agnarsdóttir, Jeremy Coote, Philip J. Hatfield, John Gascoigne - Attenborough (Foreword)
53. Park Life: The Memoirs of a Royal Parks Gamekeeper (2017) - John Bartram (Author), John Karter (Author), Attenborough (Foreword)
54. 11 Explorations into Life on Earth: Christmas Lectures from the Royal Institution (The RI Lectures Book 2) (2017) - Helen Scales (Author), Attenborough (Foreword)
55. With Honourable Intent: A Natural History of Fauna and Flora International (2017) - by Tim Knight, Mark Rose, Attenborough (Foreword)
56. Blue Planet II: A New World of Hidden Depths (2017) - James Honeyborne(Author), Mark Brownlow (Author), Attenborough (Foreword)
57. Planet Earth II: A New World Revealed (2017) - Stephen Moss (Author), Attenborough (Foreword)
58. Dynasties: The Rise and Fall of Animal Families (2018) Stephen Moss, Attenborough (Foreword)
59. Our Planet: The One Place We All Call Home, Created in partnership with WWF, Our Planet is a book for children and adults, featuring a foreword by Attenborough (2019), Matt Whyman (Author), Richard Jones (Illustrator)
60. Journeys in the Wild: The Secret Life of a Cameraman (2019) - Gavin Thurston (Author), Attenborough (Foreword)
61. Our Planet (2019) - Alastair Fothergill (Author), Keith Scholey (Author), Fred Pearce (Author), Attenborough (Foreword)
62. Seven Worlds One Planet (2019) - Jonny Keeling, Alexander Scott, Attenborough (Foreword)
63. William Smith's Fossils Reunited 2019 - Peter Wigley (Editor) with Jill Darrell, Diana Clements and Hugh Torrens, Foreword by Attenborough
64. Journeys in the Wild: The Secret Life of a Cameraman (2020) - Gavin Thurston, Attenborough (Foreword)
65. Education through the Arts for Well-Being and Community, The Vision and Legacy of Sir Alec Clegg 2020 - Edited by Catherine Burke, Peter Cunningham, Lottie Hoare, Foreword by Attenborough
66. A Life In Nature (2021) - Sir Peter Scott (Author) Attenborough (Foreword) (Originally published in 1967 under the title Happy the Man)
67. Drawn to Nature: Gilbert White and the Artists (2022) - Simon Martin (Author), Attenborough (Introduction), Virginia Woolf (Contributor)
68. Australian Wildlife Conservancy: Celebrating the First 30 Years (2022) - by Hannah Sheppard Brennand (Author, Editor), Attenborough (Foreword)

== Audiobooks ==
Year	Title	Length	Subject	Credit
1970	This Is Man’s World	-	Argo Records / World Wildlife Fun, July 1970 at Decca Studios, London.	Vocals
1978	Tarka the Otter	2 hrs	His Joyful Water-Life and Death in the Country of the Two Rivers is a 1927 novel by English writer Henry Williamson.	Narrator
1983	Yanomamo	-	By Peter Rose and Anne Conlon; on-stage narration and published audio recording.	Narrator
1990	Ocean World	-	By Peter Rose and Anne Conlon; on-stage narration (including at the Royal Festival Hall), for audio recording and video broadcast (both published).	Narrator
1992	Trials of Life	10hrs 1 min	Complete & Unabridged. Released by ISIS Audio in cassette format.	Narrator
2000	Prokofiev: Peter and the Wolf	1 hr 16 min	Attenborough narrates this symphonic fairy tale for children.	Narrator
2005	The Scars of Evolution	2x28 min = 56 min	Presented by Attenborough, a two-part BBC Radio 4 series.	Narrator
2009–2011	David Attenborough's Life Stories	6 hrs 25 min	Collected together for the very first time, this is the complete series one and two of Life Stories, written and presented by Attenborough.	Author, narrator
2010	David Attenborough – Life on Air: Memoirs of a Broadcaster	19 hrs 23 min	His career as a naturalist and broadcaster has spanned nearly five decades and there are very few places on the globe that he has not visited. In this volume of memoirs, Attenborough tells stories of the people and animals he has met and the places that he has visited.	Author, narrator
2012	Quote... Unquote: Highlights from the Acclaimed BBC Radio 4 Panel Show	1 hr 52 min	This collection features more than 50 of the show's most entertaining guests, including Attenborough	Guest contributor
2014	The Lewis Chessmen and What Happened to Them	-	Irving Finkel (Author)	Narrator
2016	Tweet of the Day: A year of the British Birds	6 hrs 50 min	Tweet of the Day is a year-long series of fascinating stories about our British birds. Some tracks by Attenborough.	Narrator
2017	David Attenborough: The Early Years Collection	10 hrs 9 min	Includes three volumes from Attenborough's chronicles: Zoo Quest for a Dragon, Quest in Paradise and Quest Under Capricorn.	Author, narrator
2018	Life on Earth	12 hrs 26 min	Attenborough reads a new edition of Life on Earth, available as an audiobook for the first time.	Author, narrator
2018	My Field Recordings From Across The Planet	-	This 2-CD set is a compilation of original field recordings made by Attenborough between 1954 and 1963, in 60 tracks. It was sold with a 52-page booklet.	Author, narrator
2019	The Peregrine	8 hrs 56 min	Attenborough reads J. A. Baker's classic of British nature writing, The Peregrine.	Narrator
2020	A Life on our Planet	6 hrs 20 min	In this scientifically informed account of the changes occurring in the world over the last century, Attenborough shares a lifetime of wisdom and a hopeful vision for the future.	Co-author, narrator
2021	Living Planet: The Web of Life on Earth	11 hrs 33 min	Audiobook for book accompanying The Living Planet TV series, a study of the ways in which living organisms, including humans, adapt to their surroundings.	Author, narrator
2022	David Attenborough in His Own Words	1 hr 31 min	Attenborough discusses his life and achievements in this collection of BBC radio and TV interviews.	Author, narrator
2022	The Hidden World: How Insects Sustain Our Life on Earth Today and Will Shape Our Lives Tomorrow	14 hrs 20 min	Dr George McGavin on an exciting audio journey to help us understand the fascinating world of insects.	Guest contributor
2022	The Trials of Life: A Natural History of Animal Behaviour	10 hrs	Released 10 November 2022 by William Collins / HarperCollins.	Author, narrator
2023	The Trials of Life: A Natural History of Animal Behaviour	10 hrs	Audiobook of book accompanying The Trials of Life TV series, tackles ethology, the study of how animals behave.	Author, narrator

== See also ==
- David Attenborough filmography
