= The Song of the Earth =

- Also known as: The Song of the Earth: A Natural History of Music
- Genre: Documentary
- Written by: David Attenborough
- Narrated by: David Attenborough
- Country of origin: United Kingdom
- Original language: English
- No. of episodes: 1

Original release
- Release: 2000

Related
- Bowerbirds: The Art of Seduction; Life on Air; Attenborough in Paradise and Other Personal Voyages

The Song of the Earth: A Natural History of Music is a BBC documentary presented by David Attenborough and written and directed by Grant Sonnex. It was first transmitted in 2000 and is part of the Attenborough in Paradise and Other Personal Voyages collection of 7 documentaries. In this documentary, Attenborough explores the connection between humans and animals when it comes to music.
