= Attenborough in Paradise =

- Genre: Documentary
- Written by: David Attenborough
- Narrated by: David Attenborough
- Country of origin: United Kingdom
- Original language: English

Original release
- Network: BBC
- Release: 1996

Related
- Attenborough in Paradise and Other Personal Voyages

Attenborough in Paradise is a BBC television documentary written and presented by David Attenborough. It was first transmitted in 1996 and is part of the Attenborough in Paradise and Other Personal Voyages collection of seven documentaries.

In this program Attenborough fulfills a childhood ambition, developed after reading a book as a nine-year-old, to see the greater bird-of-paradise in display; and records the spectacular birdlife of the New Guinea forest, in particular the various birds-of-paradise.

In 2015, the BBC released a new episode of the series shot at a Sheikh's private aviary in Qatar.

== Quotes ==
In the final piece to camera for this documentary David Attenborough introduces quotes from the 1869 book The Malay Archipelago by Alfred Russel Wallace.

53 min 15 sec

Wallace's emotions on discovering such marvels must surely be echoed by all of us who follow him. This is what he wrote:

"I thought of the long ages of the past during which the successive generations of these things of beauty had run their course. Year by year being born and living and dying amid these dark gloomy woods with no intelligent eye to gaze upon their loveliness, to all appearances such a wanton waste of beauty. It seems sad that on the one hand such exquisite creatures should live out their lives and exhibit their charms only in these wild inhospitable regions. This consideration must surely tell us that all living things were not made for man, many of them have no relation to him, their happiness and enjoyment's, their loves and hates, their struggles for existence, their vigorous life and early death, would seem to be immediately related to their own well-being and perpetuation alone"

Indeed so.
