= A Blank on the Map =

British TV documentary

- Genre: Documentary
- Written by: David Attenborough
- Narrated by: David Attenborough
- Country of origin: United Kingdom
- Original language: English

Original release
- Release: 1971

Related
- Attenborough in Paradise and Other Personal Voyages

A Blank on the Map is a television documentary produced by the BBC. Written and presented by David Attenborough, it documents his time filming in New Guinea. It was first broadcast in the UK on 29 December 1971, and is currently available on the DVD collection Attenborough in Paradise and Other Personal Voyages.

== Synopsis ==
The documentary follows Attenborough as he joins the Ambunti Patrol No. 19/1970-71 (3 May – 10 June 1971), led by ADC Laurie Bragge. They traverse a previously unexplored region in search of an uncontacted people known as the Bikaru. However, the expedition faces a setback when they are unable to find a translator from Bisorio. After several weeks in the interior without any sightings of the Bikaru people, the expedition eventually encounters signs of human habitation. Toward the conclusion of their journey, a small tribe of Biami natives approaches them. The tribe allegedly had never had contact with the outside world. The curious and friendly tribe engages in some minor trading with the expedition, but they become alarmed when Attenborough and company attempt to follow them to their homes. The tribe suddenly disappears into the forest and is not seen again. Following this encounter, the BBC crew is flown out, and the remainder of the patrol returns to Ambunti.
