= Dynasties II =

2022 television series

- Genre: Nature documentary
- Presented by: David Attenborough
- Country of origin: United Kingdom
- Original language: English
- No. of episodes: 4

Production
- Executive producer: Mike Gunton
- Producer: Simon Blakeney
- Running time: 58 minutes
- Production companies: BBC Natural History Unit; BBC Studios; BBC America; Bilibili

Original release
- Network: BBC One
- Release: 20 March – 10 April 2022

Dynasties II is a 2022 British nature documentary series commissioned by the BBC and narrated by David Attenborough. It is the sequel to Dynasties (2018) and was announced via a press release on 28 December 2020.

Developing on the success of the first series, Dynasties II continues to delve into the secret lives of charismatic, captivating animals as they fight for their families against the odds and get caught up in real life drama.

The series has four episodes, following Angelina the African elephant matriarch, she-cheetah Kali, Rupestre the puma and spotted hyena matriarch Suma. A Christmas special featuring Mac, a Barbary macaque, was broadcast in December 2022.

== Broadcast ==
=== British Television ===
The series saw its British television debut on BBC One, BBC One HD and BBC iPlayer on Sunday 20 March 2022 in the 8pm to 9pm timeslot.

=== International ===
Dynasties II has been licensed worldwide by various broadcasters including Mediaset in Italy and KBS in South Korea.

== Episodes ==
Viewing data sourced from BARB.

No.	Title	Produced by	Original release date	UK viewers (millions)
1	"Puma"	Felicity Lanchester	20 March 2022	3.65
Rupestre, a mother puma, must hunt and protect her young to ensure the survival of her dynasty. She must battle rivals, tackle prey nearly three times her size and endure the wild mountain weather of Patagonia in her bid to raise four cubs.
2	"Elephant"	Lydia Baines	27 March 2022	3.58
In Amboseli National Park, Kenya, a rare event pushes a struggling elephant family led by elephant queen Angelica to its limits. To save their dynasty, they must work together and overcome the challenge of a lifetime.
3	"Cheetah"	Simon Blakeney	3 April 2022	3.40
On the plains of Zambia, Kali, a mother cheetah, must protect her cubs from hyenas and other dangerous neighbours.
4	"Hyena"	Mandi Stark	10 April 2022	3.04
A young rival poses a challenge to Suma, a spotted hyena queen. With the rival's emergence, Suma struggles to keep her grip on power, while also trying to raise a family on Zambia's vast and unforgiving grasslands of Liuwa Plain National Park.
Special	"Macaque"	Rosie Thomas	30 December 2022	-
Mac, an alpha male Barbary macaque, must fight to retain his troop high in the Atlas Mountains of Morocco.

== Critical reception ==
Most reviews were favourable, with Carol Midgley of The Times awarding the opening episode the maximum of 5 stars and describing it as "Superb".

Gabriel Tate of The Telegraph awarded the opening episode 4 stars out of 5, stating "The storytelling was slick and accomplished, and seldom felt forced, the anthropomorphism given a respectable gloss by the avoidance of cliché in Attenborough’s wise voice-over." Rachael Sigee of the i newspaper also awarded it 4 stars noting that Dynasties II "prioritises storytelling over dissemination of information."

In contrast Nick Hilton of The Independent gave the opening episode a middling 3 stars, pointing out that, the show, "in aiming half its gaze at children, is guilty of dumbing down the great complexity of the animal brain."
