= Flying Casanovas =

2001 film by David Attenborough

- Directed by: David Attenborough
- Narrated by: David Attenborough
- Production company: PBS
- Release date: December 25, 2001

Flying Casanovas was a documentary on PBS about the different ways birds try to mate. Flying Casanovas was originally broadcast in 2001.
