= Uncovering Our Earliest Ancestor: The Link =

- Also known as: The Link
- Genre: Documentary
- Written by: David Attenborough
- Presented by: David Attenborough
- Narrated by: David Attenborough
- Country of origin: United Kingdom
- Original language: English
- No. of seasons: 1
- No. of episodes: 1

Production
- Producer: Lucie Ridout
- Production locations: Hesse, Germany
- Running time: 59:00

Original release
- Network: BBC One
- Release: 29 May 2009

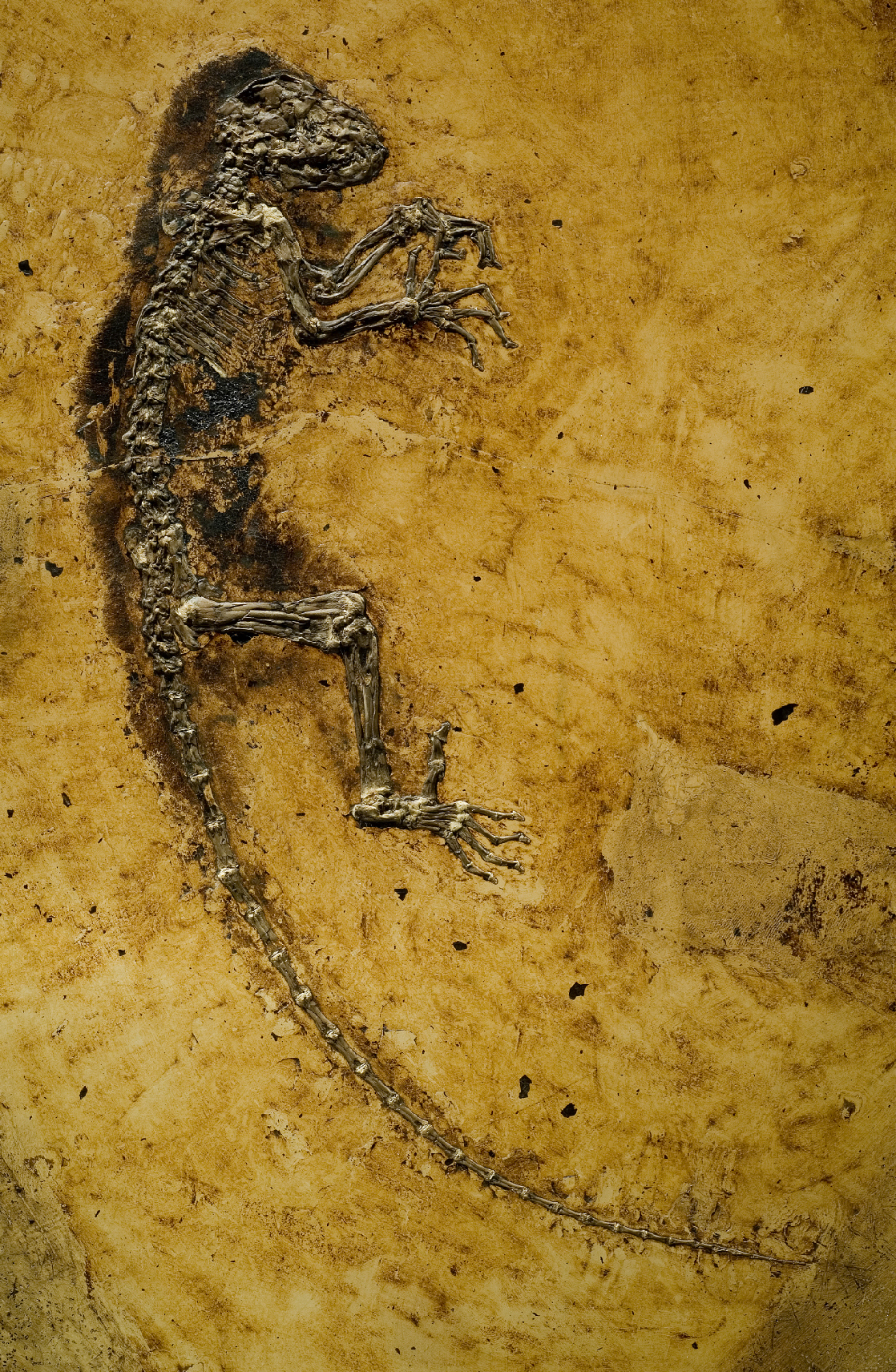
Darwinius masillae fossil

Uncovering Our Earliest Ancestor: The Link is a one-hour television documentary made by Atlantic Productions for the BBC, first aired on 26 May 2009 on BBC One. It explores the story behind the discovery of an early primate fossil, Darwinius masillae, nicknamed Ida, in a shale quarry in Germany. The fossil is believed to be around 47 million years old, and is extraordinarily well-preserved. Originally unearthed in 1983, Ida lay in the hands of a private collector for 20 years before it was shown to a Norwegian paleontologist, Dr Jørn Hurum. Realising that Ida could turn out to be a significant missing link between modern primates, lemurs and lower mammals, he persuaded the Natural History Museum in Oslo to purchase the fossil and assembled an international team of experts to study it. Their findings were announced in a press conference and the online publication of a scientific paper on 19 May 2009.

The BBC programme was narrated by David Attenborough. An alternative edit of the programme entitled The Link debuted on the History Channel on 25 May 2009 in a two-hour slot.
