= Dynasties (2018 TV series) =

- Genre: Nature documentary
- Presented by: David Attenborough
- Composers: Benji Merrison; Will Slater
- Country of origin: United Kingdom
- Original language: English
- No. of episodes: 5

Production
- Executive producer: Mike Gunton
- Running time: 59 minutes
- Production companies: BBC Natural History Unit; BBC Studios; BBC America; France Télévisions; Tencent Penguin Pictures; CCTV-9

Original release
- Network: BBC One; BBC Earth
- Release: 11 November – 9 December 2018

Dynasties is a 2018 British nature documentary series on five vulnerable or endangered species known to form enduring populations: chimpanzee, emperor penguin, lion, tiger and African wild dog. The series is produced by the BBC Natural History Unit and narrated by David Attenborough. The music score was composed by Benji Merrison. Each episode ends with Dynasties On Location, a behind the scenes look at the planning of each episode, which could be years in advance before production crew even started filming.

The series debut was on 11 November 2018 simultaneously broadcast on BBC One, BBC One HD and BBC Earth, and premiered on the same day in Asia. The series debuts in the U.S. as a four-network simulcast (BBC America, AMC, IFC, and Sundance) on 19 January 2019, and in New Zealand on TVNZ 1 on 20 January 2019 (NZDT), with all 5 episodes available on TVNZ On Demand. A sequel series named Dynasties II aired in 2022 consisting of four episodes.

== Episodes ==
Viewing data sourced from BARB.

No.	Title	Produced by	Original release date	UK viewers (millions)
1	"Chimpanzee"	Rosie Thomas	11 November 2018	7.63
David is the longest reigning alpha male African chimpanzee in a tribe that lives in the Senegalese forest, having held his title for three years straight. However, with de-forestation due to a recent gold rush, a long drought and competition for the throne and mates, he is losing his grip at the top after being attacked by other eligible adult males who staged a coup and left him for dead. David survived the attack, and fathered a son 10 months later, but died of a combination of age and injuries during the series' post production phase.
2	"Emperor"	Miles Barton	18 November 2018	7.71
The story follows the lives and survival stories of Emperor Penguins that return to Atka Bay and Neumayer Station III in autumn to breed, the males huddling and guarding the eggs for 4 months without eating while the females fish for food, returning home just as the newborns hatch. Some mothers of deceased chicks are seen attempting to steal baby penguins from pairs that were successful, while the fathers make the journey to the sea to recover their strength, then return to the colony once more. By springtime, the newborns must learn to stand and huddle to shelter from the cold as both parents go out to fish, and they moult before reaching adulthood. In the behind-the-scenes section, it was revealed that the production crew stepped in to rescue a group of penguins (including numerous chicks) who had become trapped inside a steep trench, with the crew using shovels to dig a slope the penguins could use to get to safety.
3	"Lion"	Simon Blakeney	25 November 2018	8.24
The story is a two-year journey that follows the Marsh Pride of lions in the Maasai Mara, led by lionesses Charm and cousin Sienna after the pride's adult males abandon the group. Charm struggles to keep the remaining members together and thriving during the annual wildebeest migration from threats such as intentional poisoning from local tribespeople (which kills one of Charm's young sons, as well as Sienna), and wandering adult male lions. One of Charm's elder sons, Tatu, eventually leaves the pride with his cousin, Red, to start a new pride. Eventually, two adult males take over the Marsh Pride, leading to the remaining young cubs leaving the pride for their own safety. Charm eventually mates with one of the males, and, four months later, gives birth to two cubs, who are accepted into the pride. Yaya, Charm's adult daughter, also becomes pregnant with the other male's cubs, making Charm a first-time grandmother. In the behind-the-scenes, it was revealed that Charm's poisoned son did receive treatment from local doctors, but it was unsuccessful.
4	"Painted Wolf"	Nick Lyon	2 December 2018	6.90
Tait is the elderly matriarch of a pack of painted wolves in Zimbabwe's Mana Pools National Park. Her pack is driven out of their territory by Tait's daughter, Blacktip, the matriarch of a rival pack in need of more space for their large family of 32. Their combined territory also shrunk over Tait's lifetime due to the expansion of human, hyena and lion territories. Tait leads her family into the territory of a lion pride in the midst of a drought, with Blacktip's pack in an eight month long pursuit. During this time, both packs welcome a litter of puppies, and Tait's pride somehow manages to keep their pack alive in midst of lion pride territory. Blacktip's pack suffers heavy losses, including the loss of a puppy from a hyena clan, and an adult from crocodiles. Having suffered these casualties, Blacktip ends the pursuit and retreats back to her original territory. Before Tait's pack move back to their territory, age catches up with Tait, and she and the dominant male are killed by lions deep in the pride's territory. Tait's pack encounter a group of roving males before returning to their territory, and Tait's daughter, Tammy, becomes the new matriarch, welcoming a litter of 7 puppies. Blacktip also welcomes a litter of puppies back in her original territory, bringing balance back to Tait's descendants, and her dynasty continuing to thrive.
5	"Tiger"	Miles Barton	9 December 2018	7.47
Raj Bhera, a female Bengal tiger, raises her four cubs, including youngest daughter Biba, to adulthood over 2 years in India's Bandhavgarh Tiger Reserve, while defending her territory against other tigers, battling dwindling natural habitat, nocturnal animals hunting for the young cubs in the den for food, summer heatwaves and droughts. As the cubs turn two months, Raj Bhera shows them around her territory and introduces them to a new diet. Meanwhile, Solo, her adult daughter, also tries to gain more territory due to the lack of space, but she has no success. The cubs grow into adolescents at 9 months. As the smallest and weakest cub, Biba often only gets final dibs on hunted food. The cubs have to be wary of other ranging tigers who may attack them to defend their territory. Biba encounters her father by chance, who normally lives a solitary life, but recognises the cub as his own. By the time the cubs are a year old, they practise hunting skills on each other. The monsoon season returns and Raj Bhera is injured, forcing Biba to find a new territory for herself and leave her family much sooner than expected. Raj Bhera is later rescued by park officials as she ventured well out of the reserve to a nearby village, where she was sighted by the people there. In the end, the three male cubs survived to adulthood, with Biba's fate unknown.
Special	"Meerkat"	Emma Napper	28 December 2020	-
A Dynasties special that follows the life of Maghogho, a meerkat queen living in the Makgadikgadi salt pans.

== Merchandise ==
=== Home media ===
The series was released as a two-disc DVD set as well as a standard Blu-ray set on 3 December 2018, and as a four-disc 4K UHD Blu-ray + Blu-ray set on 10 December 2018. Media is distributed by BBC Studios in the UK.

=== Book ===
An accompanying hardback book was written by Steven Moss with a foreword by David Attenborough. It is published by BBC Books (ISBN 978-1785943010) and released on 25 October 2018 in the UK.

The book Painted Wolves: A Wild Dog's Life by Nicholas Dyer and Peter Blinston is a large-format coffee-table book that charts the lives and fortunes of the same packs of painted wolves featured in BBC Dynasties. It is published by Lycaon Ventures (ISBN 9781999611033).

== Soundtrack ==
Dynasties

Soundtrack album by Benji Merrison & Will Slater
- Released: 11 November 2018 (Digital); 14 December 2018 (Audio CD)
- Genres: Soundtrack, Classical music
- Label: Silva Screen Records
- Producers: BBC Studios; BBC Earth

The musical score and songs featured in the series were composed by Benji Merrison and Will Slater. A digital soundtrack was released on 11 November 2018, while a two physical disc will be released on 14 December 2018 in the UK.

== Sequel ==
On 28 December 2020, on the same day that a Christmas special following a meerkat family was broadcast, it was announced that the BBC would be creating a sequel to Dynasties named Dynasties II. This series aired in 2022 and consisted of four episodes, following Angelina the African elephant matriarch, she-cheetah Kali, Rupestre the puma and spotted hyena matriarch Suma.
