= Legends of the Deep: Deep Sea Sharks =

- Genre: Nature documentary
- Narrated by: David Attenborough
- Composer: Joe Hisaishi
- Country of origin: United Kingdom
- Original languages: English & Japanese (subtitled)
- No. of episodes: 1

Production
- Executive producers: Hiromichi Iwasaki, Gen Sasaki, Keizo Izuta, Chris Weber, Yoshiaki Sugai
- Producers: Yoshio Yuki, Leslie Schwerin, Tatsuhiro Beniko
- Running time: 52 minutes
- Production companies: BBC Natural History Unit, BBC Worldwide, NHK

Original release
- Network: BBC Four
- Release: 19 July 2015 – 29 October 2017

Legends of the Deep: Deep-Sea Sharks is a 2015 British nature documentary programme made for BBC Television, first shown in the UK on BBC Four on 19 July 2015. The programme is narrated by Sir David Attenborough.

This documentary follows a Japanese team of scientists studying deep-sea sharks off the Pacific coast of Japan in Suruga Bay and Sagami Bay. The team utilized midget submarines as well as remote cameras placed near a sperm whale carcass to observe these sharks in their natural environment. Several of the species featured in this programme are bluntnose sixgill sharks, goblin sharks and frilled sharks, which Gill Crawford of RadioTimes comments, "when you see these creatures, you may wish they’d all stayed under wraps".
