= Attenborough in Paradise and Other Personal Voyages =

DVD collection of documentary specials

Attenborough in Paradise and Other Personal Voyages is a DVD collection of seven David Attenborough BBC documentary specials.

== Documentary Summaries ==
=== A Blank on the Map (1971) ===
The central area of New Guinea was thought to be uninhabited until aerial photographs showed signs of human habitation. Attenborough accompanies an expedition into the interior to find and make contact with these people and map the area.

=== Attenborough in Paradise (1996) ===
Attenborough achieves a childhood ambition of finding and filming the birds-of-paradise described by Alfred Russel Wallace in his book, The Malay Archipelago. He visits New Guinea and surrounding islands to track down these birds. Their plumage, colours and mating dances are spectacular. The environment is so benign that the female birds can build their nests and raise their young without the help of males, so the females choose a mate on the basis of his beauty and dancing ability alone. As a result, sexual selection has produced the most incredible variety of extravagant displays imaginable....

=== The Lost Gods of Easter Island (2000) ===
A carved wooden idol that Attenborough purchased in an auction room is traced back to its origin: Easter Island. It was cheap because the seller believed it was a forgery. During the course of this programme its whole history is discovered: carved on Easter Island while there was still wood of the Toromiro tree (now extinct on the island), to represent the god Makemake, traded with the crew of captain Cook's ship, transported to Tahiti, probably traded by the Tahitians with the crew of an American whaling ship and ended up in the US.

=== Bowerbirds: The Art of Seduction (2000) ===
Attenborough heads to Australia and New Guinea. Like the Birds of Paradise, Bowerbird females build their nests and raise their young alone so the male has all day to gather his treasures and create his bower. There seems to be a bowerbird rule: the more elaborate the bower the plainer the bird – the simpler the bower, the more vivid the plumage. David mischievously moves a leaf or a piece of lichen to see what the bird will do, then moves away. The bird flies back scoldingly and fussily returns his artistic display to its former perfection. Fascinating.

=== The Song of the Earth (2000) ===
This natural history of music begins with Attenborough playing the piano. Searching for the origins of human music, he traces its connections to the musical sounds that other animals make: the beauty of the wolf's howl, the complexity of the bat's cry, the deep rumble of the elephant's signals, the acoustically sophisticated sounds the dolphin produces and the songs of whales and birds. Why do these animals produce this amazing variety of sounds? It's all tied up with sex and territory.

=== Life on Air: David Attenborough's 50 Years in Television (2002) ===
This BBC documentary traces David Attenborough's career. It is presented by Michael Palin and was first transmitted in 2002. It takes an in depth look at Attenborough's career in television: from his earliest application for a job with BBC radio, through his elevation to BBC Director of Programmes where they were kind enough to let him out of his suit every now and then to go and be intrepid, his rejection of the job of BBC Director General so that he could film Life on Earth.

=== The Amber Time Machine (2004) ===
At age 12, Attenborough receives a piece of amber that had washed up on the shores of the Baltic sea. He travels there to find out what that piece of amber has to tell about life in the surrounding forests. He then travels to the Dominican Republic, where a group of scientists is able to reconstruct an ecosystem from 20 million years ago. Attenborough also discusses the scientific feasibility of preserving DNA in amber, and talks about the science behind Jurassic Park (1993). Attenborough concludes that some old, rare pieces of amber may contain DNA.
