= Favourite Attenborough Moments =

Television poll

Favourite Attenborough Moments is the name of a television poll conducted by the UKTV Documentary channel in 2006. The poll called on members of the British public to vote for their favourite moment from Sir David Attenborough's 50-year career in broadcasting.

== Format ==
The format consisted of two programmes. My Favourite Attenborough Moment was the first, broadcast on 15 April 2006. Celebrity admirers of Attenborough's work (including Joanna Lumley, Björk and several presenters and producers from the BBC Natural History Unit) introduced a shortlist of twenty highlights from Attenborough's nature documentaries and advocated their particular favourites. The second programme, Your Favourite Attenborough Moment, counted down the same twenty clips in the order of votes received from the viewers. It was broadcast on 7 May 2006, the day before Attenborough's 80th birthday, and featured interviews with Attenborough in which he described the experiences of filming them.

== Results ==
The results are summarised below. The winning sequence was the lyrebird featured in The Life of Birds, which polled almost a quarter of the 13,000 votes cast. The mountain gorilla encounter from Life on Earth came second with 17% of the votes and the blue whale sequence from The Life of Mammals was third with 15%.

Rank	Sequence	Series	Advocated by
1	Attenborough observes a lyrebird mimicking various noises	The Life of Birds	Bill Oddie
2	A close encounter with mountain gorillas in Rwanda	Life on Earth	Sanjeev Bhaskar
3	Attenborough watches a blue whale surface alongside his boat	The Life of Mammals	Alan Titchmarsh
4	His description of the demise of Easter Island's Rapa Nui civilisation	State of the Planet	Charlotte Uhlenbroek
5	Chimpanzees using tools to crack nuts	The Life of Mammals	Charlotte Uhlenbroek
6	Attenborough in shot with a grizzly bear fishing for salmon	The Life of Mammals	Steve Leonard
7	Luring a Magellanic Woodpecker by imitating the sound of it drilling a hole	The Life of Birds	Ray Mears
8	Tripped up by a displaying male capercaillie	The Life of Birds	Bill Oddie
9	Chimpanzees wading through water on two feet	The Life of Mammals	Gavin Thurston
10	Observing a male Vogelkop Bowerbird's display	Attenborough in Paradise	Joanna Lumley
11	Watching elephants mining salt in a Kenyan mountain cave	The Life of Mammals	Joanna Lumley
12	Tracking chimpanzees as they chase and kill a colobus monkey	The Trials of Life	Alastair Fothergill
13	Mexican free-tailed bats leaving a cave and Attenborough releasing one of their young	The Trials of Life	Rory McGrath
14	Attenborough defends himself from a bellowing bull elephant seal	Life in the Freezer	Björk
15	A wandering albatross chick and its parent	Life in the Freezer	Ellen MacArthur
16	The mass migration and spawning of 100 million Christmas Island red crabs	The Trials of Life	Simon King
17	Attenborough hoists himself into the forest canopy to watch gibbons at close quarters	The Life of Mammals	Steve Leonard
18	Burrowing under a termite mound to demonstrate its cooling system	The Trials of Life	Björk
19	Describing the titan arum, a contender for the world's largest flower	The Private Life of Plants	Alan Titchmarsh
20	Illustrating plant aggression using innovative timelapse footage of brambles	The Private Life of Plants	Rory McGrath

Many of the shortlisted clips are available on the BBC Earth YouTube channel. The lyrebird clip has been viewed more than 3 million times since it was first made available. Web users in the UK can also find them, along with many other clips, in the David Attenborough's Favourite Moments collection on the BBC Wildlife Finder.
