= The Life Collection =

DVD box set of David Attenborough series

The Life Collection DVD Box

The Life Collection is a collection of nine documentary series written and presented by David Attenborough for the BBC Natural History Unit. It is available as a 24-disc DVD box set of nine titles from David Attenborough's Life series of programmes. The box set was originally released in the United Kingdom on 5 December 2005, containing 8 titles; the ninth title was added in a 2018 reissue.

The collection has also been made available on Region 4 DVD in Australia and New Zealand, although it contains four fewer discs, as Life on Earth is not included.

== Contents ==
- Life on Earth (1979)
- The Living Planet (1984)
- The Trials of Life (1990)
- Life in the Freezer (1993)
- The Private Life of Plants (1995)
- The Life of Birds (1998)
- The Life of Mammals (2002)
- Life in the Undergrowth (2005)
- Life in Cold Blood (2008)
