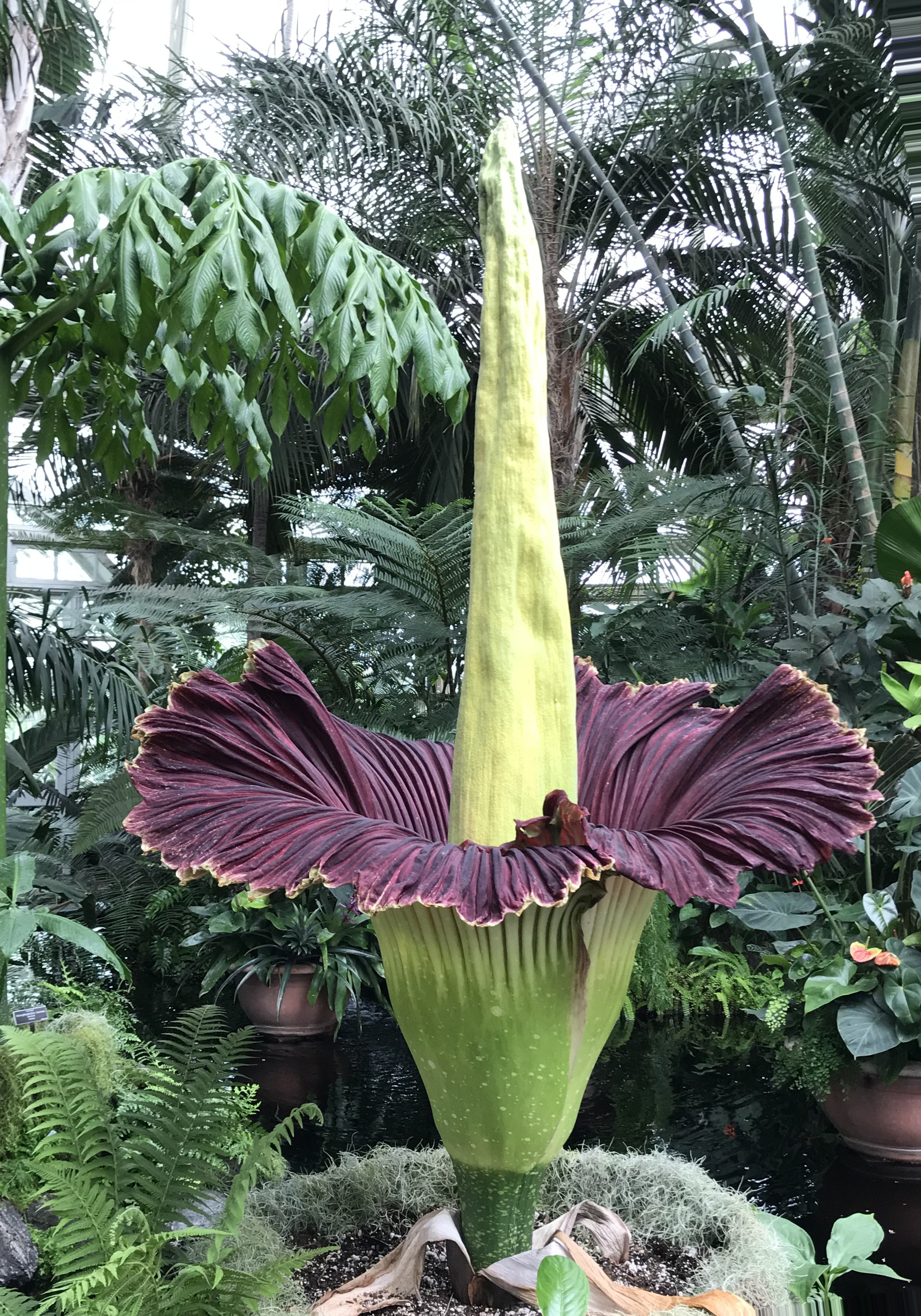
- In bloom at New York Botanical Garden; June 27, 2018

Conservation status
- Endangered (IUCN 3.1)

Scientific classification
- Kingdom: Plantae
- Clade: Tracheophytes
- Clade: Angiosperms
- Clade: Monocots
- Order: Alismatales
- Family: Araceae
- Genus: Amorphophallus
- Species: A. titanum

Binomial name
- Amorphophallus titanum (Becc.) Becc. ex Arcang

Synonyms
- Amorphophallus selebicus Nakai; Conophallus titanum Becc.

= Amorphophallus titanum =

Species of flowering plant

Amorphophallus titanum, the titan arum, is a flowering plant in the family Araceae. It has a large unbranched inflorescence, a tall single leaf branched like a tree, and a heavy tuber which enables the plant to produce the inflorescence. A. titanum is endemic to rainforests on the Indonesian island of Sumatra.

Its flower blooms infrequently and only for a short period, and gives off a powerful scent of rotting flesh which attracts pollinators. As a consequence, it is characterized as a carrion flower, earning it the names corpse flower or corpse plant.

Amorphophallus titanum was first brought to flower in cultivation at the Royal Botanic Gardens, Kew in 1889. Since then it has flowered at many botanic gardens but remains difficult for amateurs to cultivate. Flowerings can attract crowds of thousands of visitors, and in the 21st century also thousands of viewers on live streaming.

== Etymology ==
Amorphophallus titanum derives its name from Ancient Greek (ἄμορφος amorphos, "without form, misshapen" + φαλλός phallos, "phallus", and Τιτάν Titan, "titan, giant"). The common name corpse flower is translated from the Indonesian name bunga bangkai with the same meaning.

The name "titan arum" is said to have been coined during the filming of David Attenborough's 1995 The Private Life of Plants, as the generic name Amorphophallus was considered to be "too rude" for television audiences.

== Life-cycle ==
Amorphophallus titanum life-cycle

=== Leaf ===
A single leaf, the size and shape of a small tree, grows from the seed. The leaf grows on a patterned green and white petiole or stalk that branches into three sections at the top, each containing many leaflets. The leaf can reach up to 4.7 m (15 ft) tall. The trunklike petiole bearing the leaf can be "as thick as a person's thigh". Food in the form of sugars from the leaf accumulates (as starch) in an underground tuber or corm. After a period of about a year, the old leaf dies, and a new one grows in its place from the tuber.

=== Tuber ===
When a leaf dies, the tuber becomes dormant for about four months. Then the plant produces another leaf, and repeats the cycle of supplying food to the tuber. This may continue for up to around seven years. The tuber is the largest of any known flowering plant; it may weigh more than 90 kg (200 lb).

=== Inflorescence ===
After some years, when the tuber is sufficiently large, the plant develops an inflorescence instead of a leaf. This can take ten years from seed; subsequent flowerings can be more frequent, typically at intervals of three to seven years. The inflorescence can reach over 3 m (10 ft) in height. The inflorescence consists of a tall fragrant spadix of flowers wrapped by a spathe, shaped like an upside-down bell, resembling a petal. The spathe is deep green with cream-coloured specks on the outside, and dark burgundy red or maroon on the inside. Its sides are ribbed, creating a frilled edge. Near the bottom of the spadix, hidden from view inside the sheath of the spathe, the spadix bears two rings of small flowers. The upper ring bears between 450 and 5,000 small cream-coloured male flowers; the lower ring consists of the pink carpels of female flowers. Shortly before flowering, the two leaflike bracts at the base of the spathe dry up and die. The female flowers open before the male flowers to prevent self-pollination. The flowers last for between 24 and 36 hours.

=== Pollination by carrion insects ===
As the spathe gradually opens, the spadix heats up to 37 °C (99 °F), and rhythmically releases a powerful smell to attract carrion insects which feed on or lay their eggs in rotting meat. The potency of the smell gradually increases from late evening until the middle of the night, when carrion beetles and flesh flies are active as pollinators, then tapers off towards morning. Analyses of chemicals released by the spadix show the stench includes dimethyl trisulfide (like limburger cheese), dimethyl disulfide (garlic), trimethylamine (rotting fish), isovaleric acid (sweaty socks), benzyl alcohol (sweet floral scent), phenol (like Chloraseptic), and indole (like faeces). The smell is detectable up to 800 m (0.50 mi) away. The inflorescence's deep red colour and texture contribute to the illusion that the spathe is a piece of meat. During bloom, the tip of the spadix is roughly human body temperature, which helps the perfume volatilize. The heated spadix creates a micro-convection in the cool ambient air, enhancing the transport of the scent. The heat helps to convince carrion-feeding insects that a dead body is present, attracting them to the inflorescence.

=== Fruits and seeds ===
The carpels of pollinated female flowers ripen into fruits. The spathe and the upper part of the spadix wither away, leaving a short spike bearing a column of bright red fruits. These attract rhinoceros hornbills which eat the fruits and disperse the seeds around the rainforest. The spike dies back after around nine months, and the tuber becomes dormant for about a year. It can then produce a new leaf and restart the cycle.

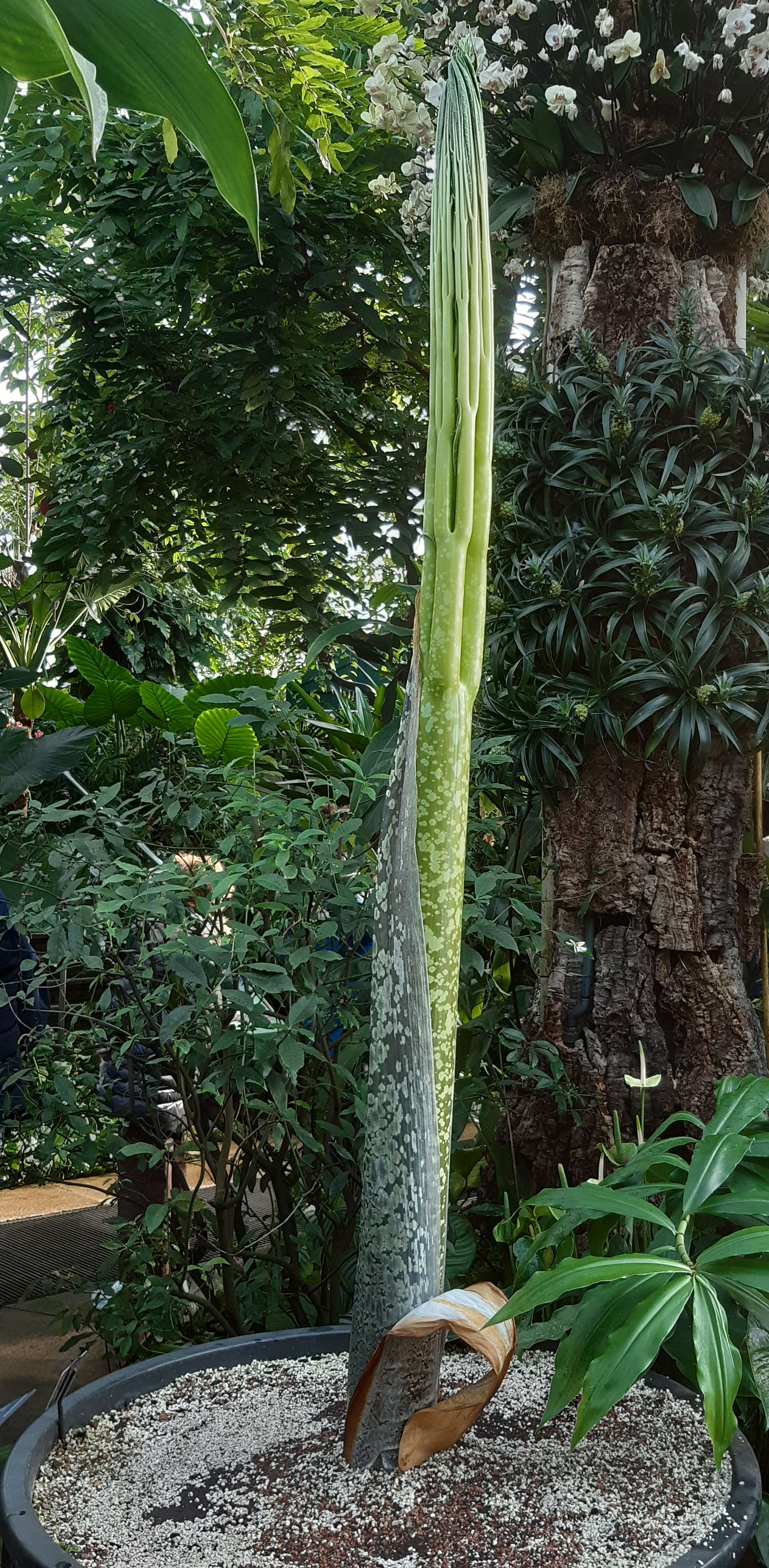
Leaf emerging, still tightly furled, nearly 2 m tall

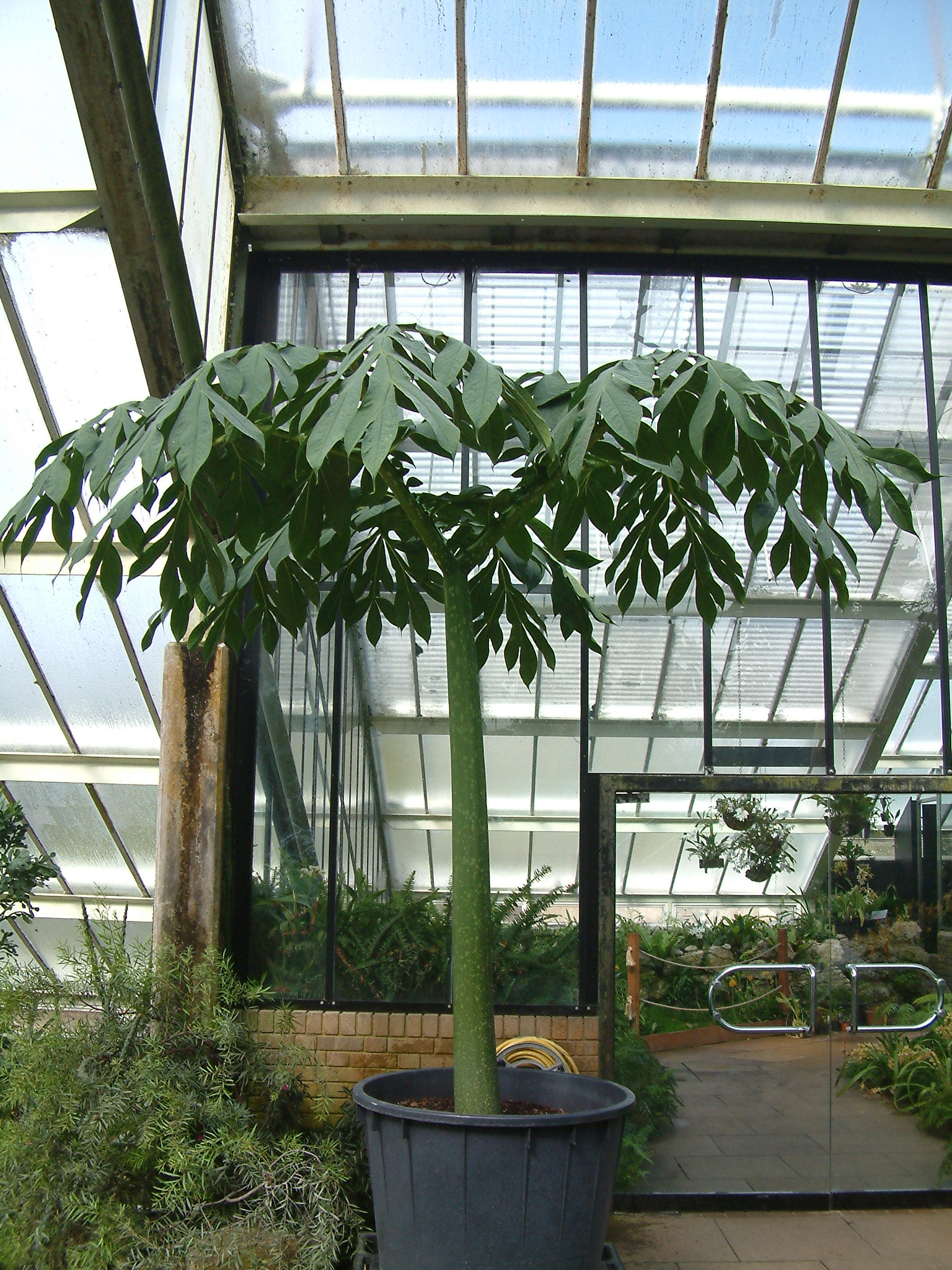
The plant produces a single leaf at a time.

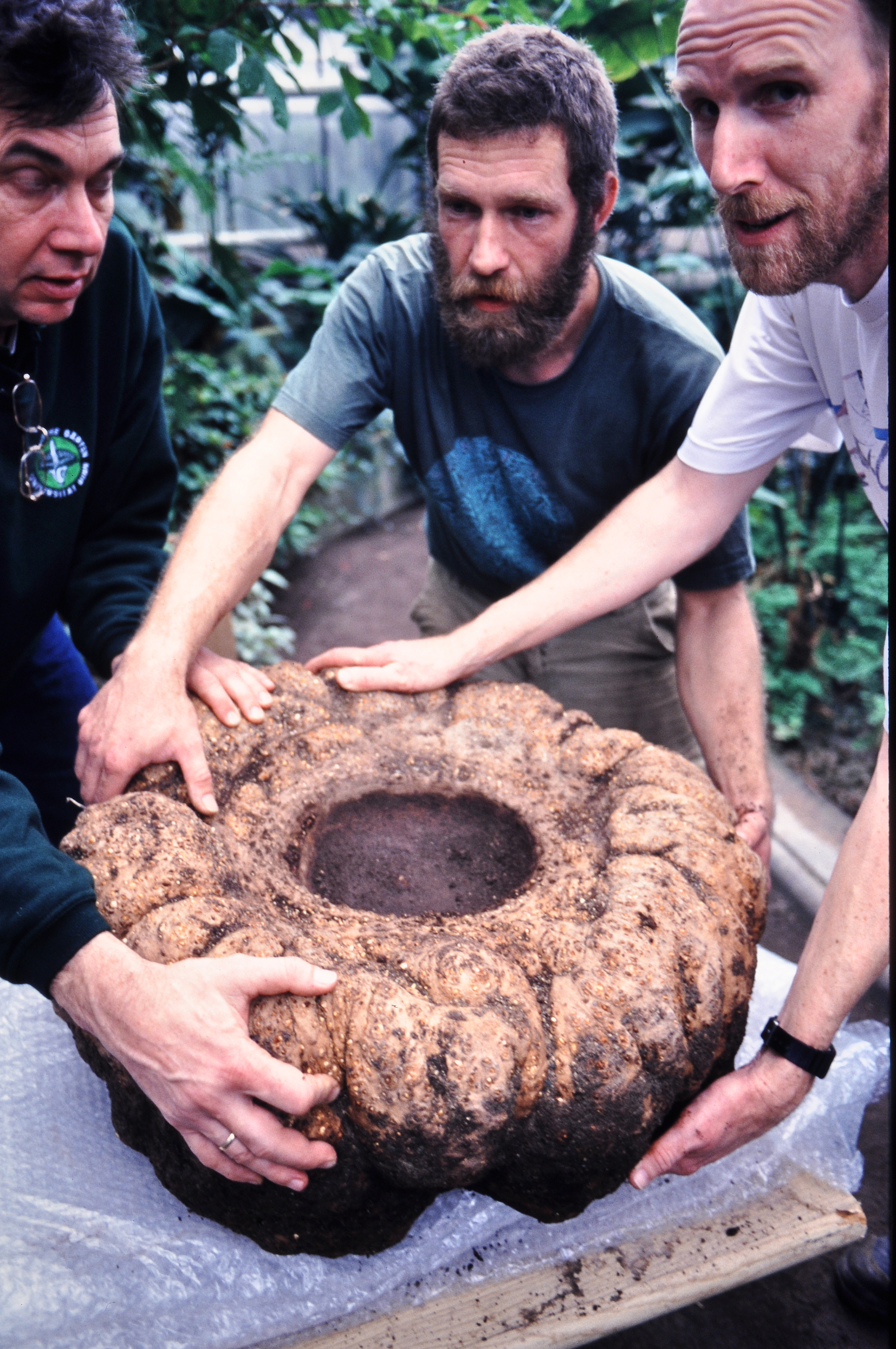
A tuber weighing 117 kg, which produced three inflorescences simultaneously in May 2006 at the Botanic Gardens, Bonn

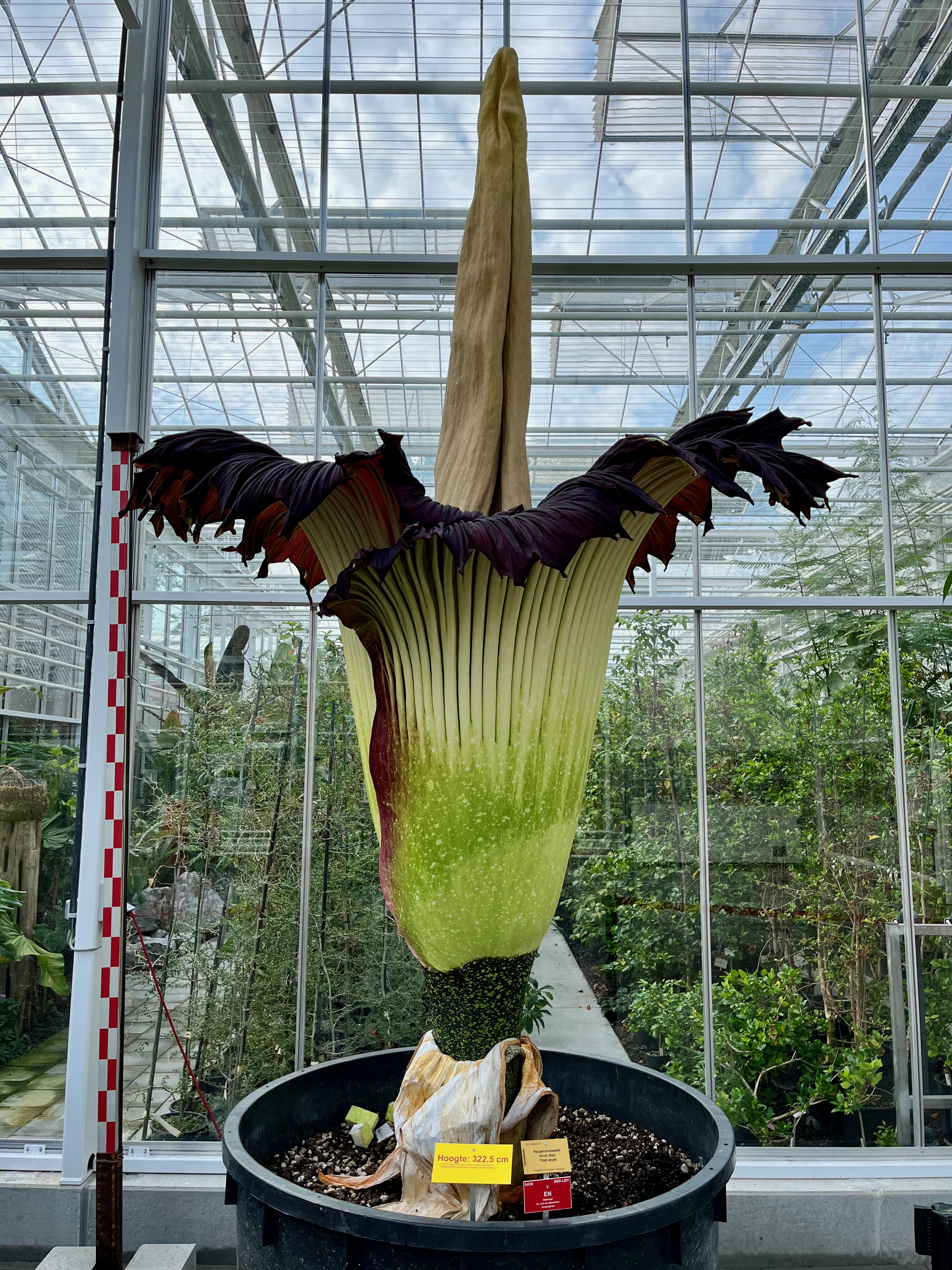
The tallest inflorescence was recorded at Meise Botanic Garden, Belgium, on 13 August 2024. It measured 322.5 cm from the tuber.

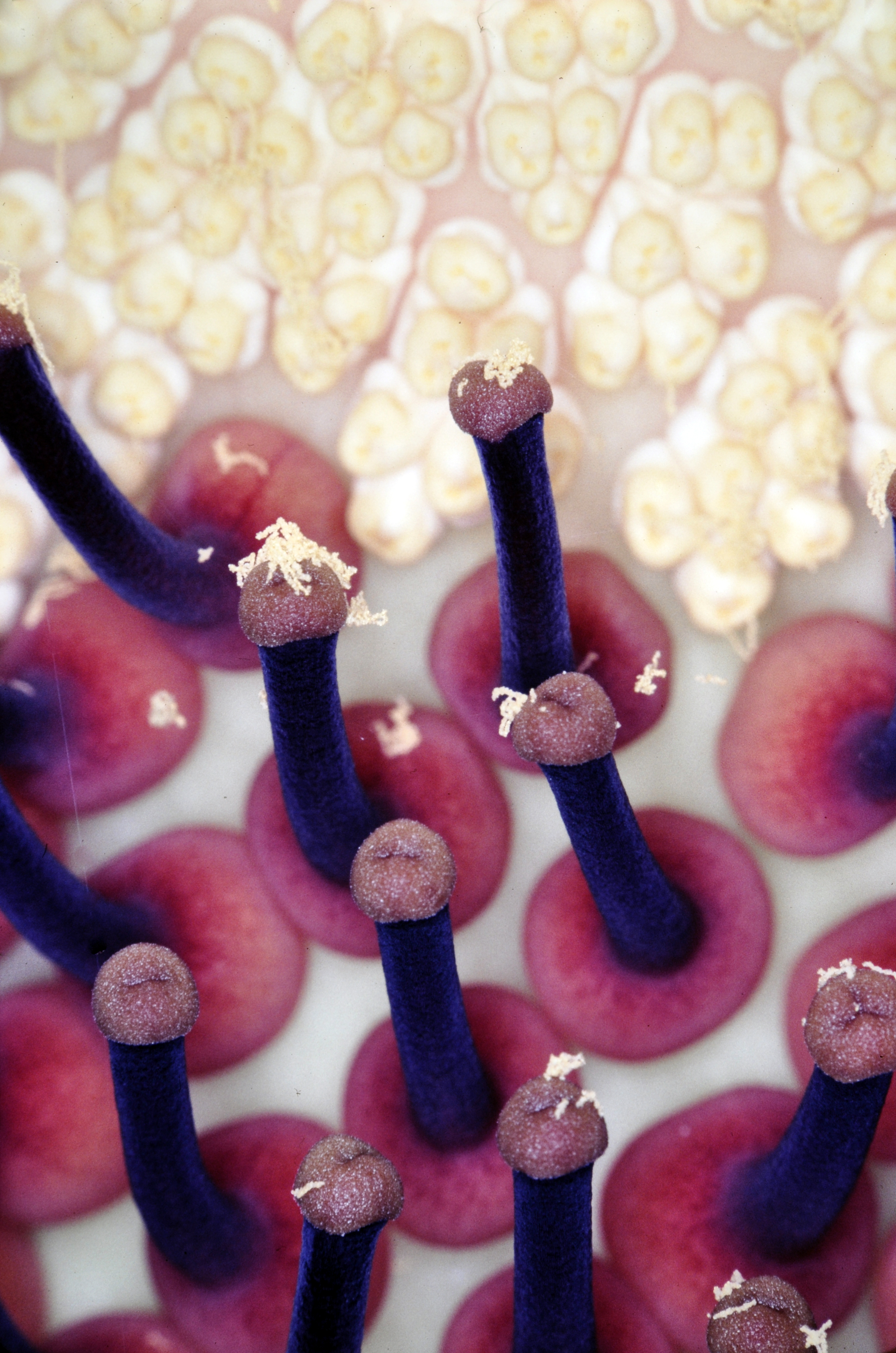
Male (above, yellow) and female (below, brownish-purple) flowers at the base of the spadix

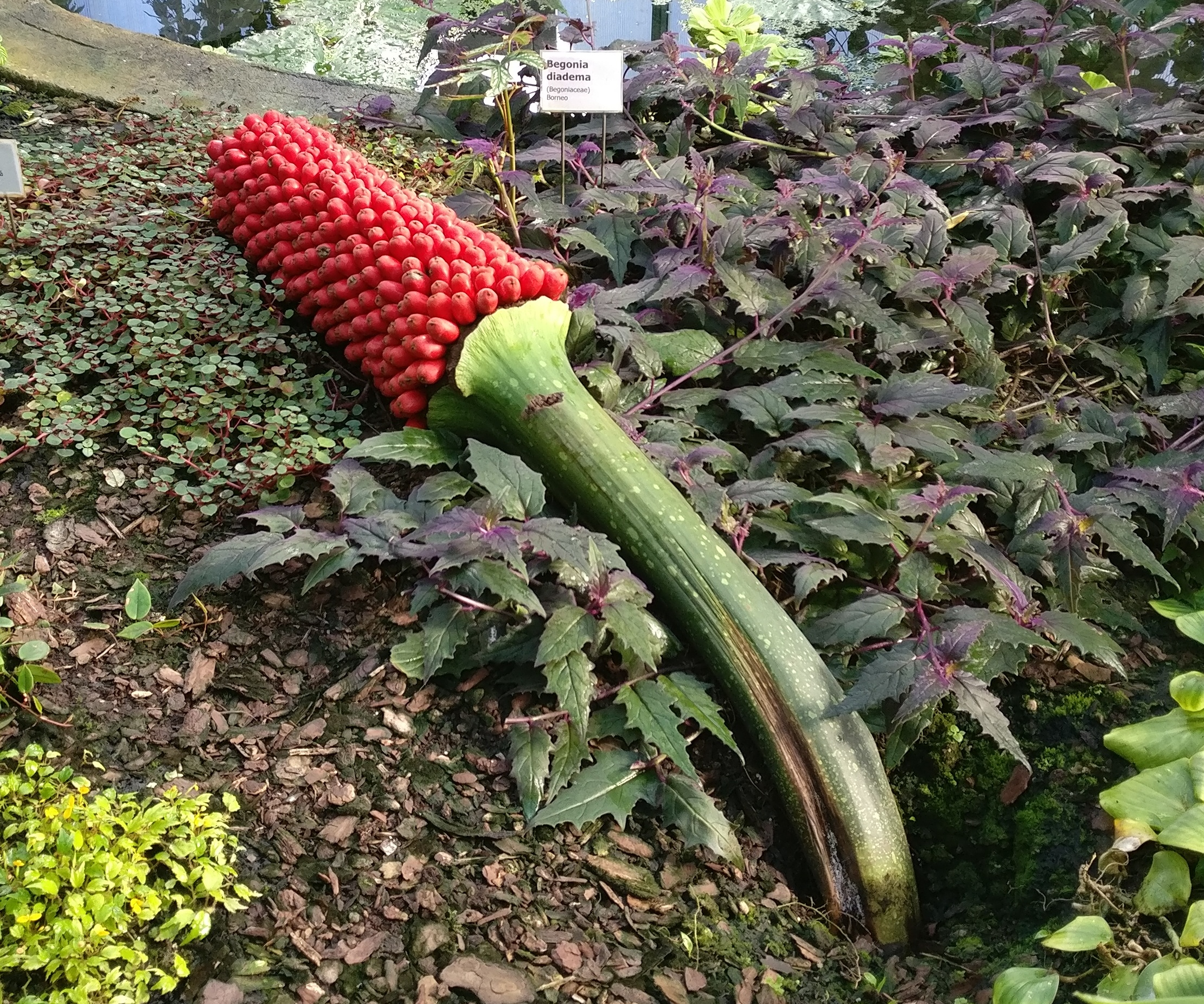
Titan arum spike with fruits

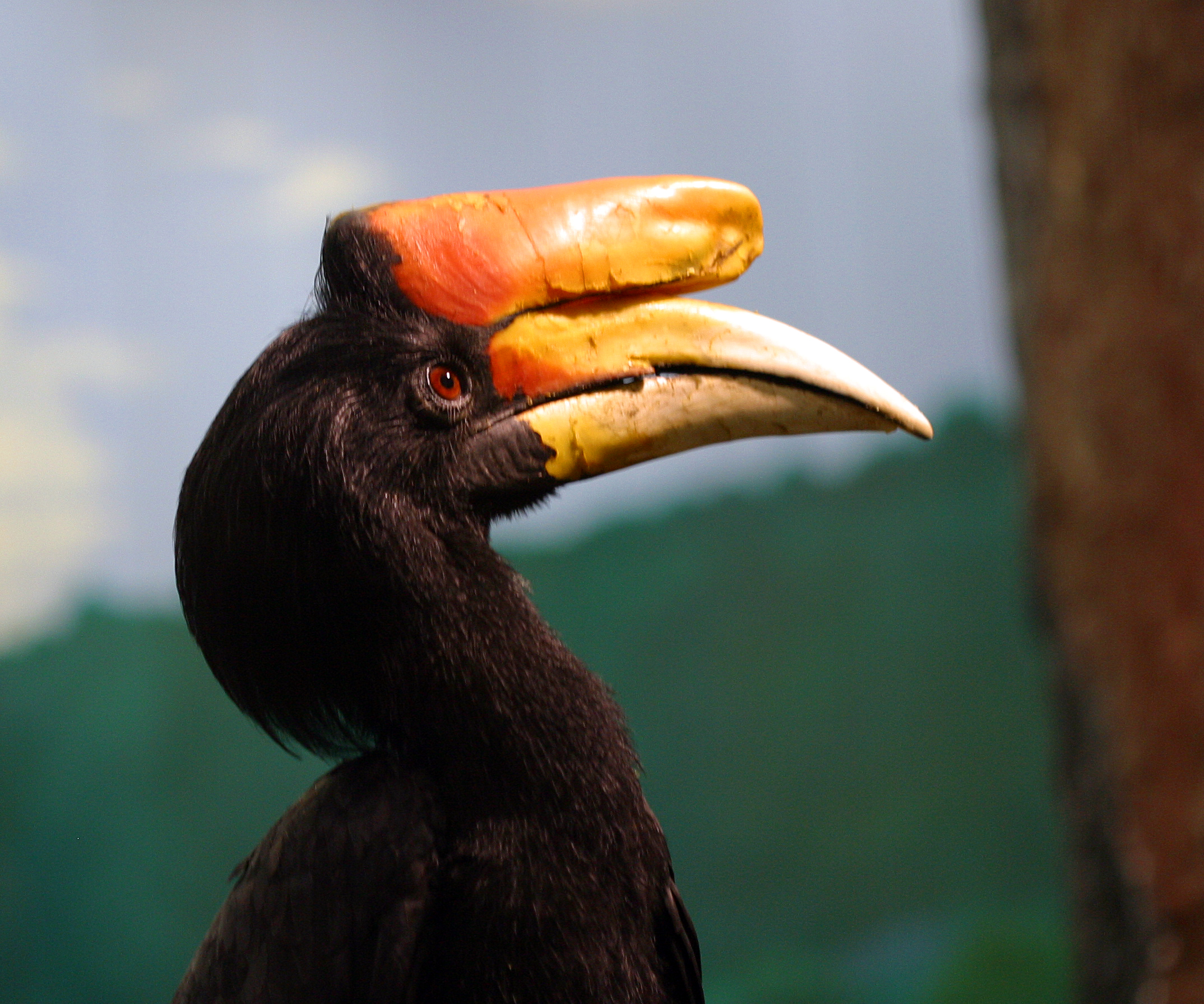
The fruits are eaten and the seeds dispersed by rhinoceros hornbills.

== Taxonomy and distribution ==
Amorphophallus titanum was first scientifically described in 1878 by the Italian botanist Odoardo Beccari. Beccari discovered the plant on 6 August 1878 in the rainforest in the hills above Priaman, Western Sumatra, and brought a dried inflorescence, tubers, and seeds back to Europe. The first leaf specimen was collected at Air Mancur, to the west of Padang Panjang.

Beccari initially named the species Conophallus titanum in 1878, in a letter that was published anonymously on his behalf under the title "Il Conophallus titanum—Beccari". In 1879, Giovanni Arcangeli published a full description of the species and moved it into the genus Amorphophallus. Plants in the genus all have a single locule inside the ovary, and are found across tropical Africa, India, Southeast Asia, Japan, Indonesia, Papua New Guinea, and Australia.

The species is endemic to western Sumatra, where it grows in openings in rainforests on limestone hills. Its range is decreasing with climate change and loss of habitat. There are population hotspots in southern Aceh and Sumatera Utara provinces.

== Cultivation ==
Amorphophallus titanum first flowered in cultivation at the Royal Botanic Gardens, Kew, London, in 1889, grown from the single seedling that Kew received from Beccari. The species became the symbol of the Indonesian Botanic Gardens in Java in 1894. The first documented flowerings in the United States were at the New York Botanical Garden in 1937 and 1939. These flowerings can attract crowds of thousands of visitors, and in the 21st century also thousands on Internet live streaming, and inspired the designation of the titan arum as the official flower of the Bronx in 1939 (replaced in 2000 by the day lily). In the Botanical Garden, Bonn, the titan arum has been cultivated since 1932.

The number of cultivated plants has increased because the cultivation requirements for garden specimens are known in detail, and it has become common in the 21st century for five or more flowerings to occur in gardens around the world in a single year. Challenging cultivation constraints mean that the plant is rarely cultivated by amateur gardeners. Nevertheless, in 2011, Roseville High School in California became the first school in the world to bring a titan arum to bloom. The flower bloomed again in September 2020. The largest tuber so far recorded was grown at the Royal Botanic Garden Edinburgh in 2010; it weighed 153.9 kg (339 lb) after seven years' growth from an initial tuber the size of an orange. The tallest documented inflorescence was at Meise Botanic Garden; on 13 August 2024 it reached 3.225 metres (10.58 ft) in height.

In cultivation, Amorphophallus titanum generally requires five to ten years of vegetative growth before blooming for the first time. After a plant's initial blooming, there can be considerable variation in its blooming frequency. The cultivation conditions are known in detail. Some plants may not bloom again for another seven to ten years, while others may bloom every two or three years. At the Botanical Garden, Bonn, under optimal cultivation conditions, the plants flowered every other year. A plant has flowered every second year (2012 to 2022) in the Copenhagen Botanical Garden. Anomalous flowerings have been documented, including consecutive blooms within a year, and a tuber simultaneously sending up both a leaf (or two) and an inflorescence. Triplet inflorescences have been recorded from Bonn, Germany (from a 117 kg (258 lb) tuber), and at the Chicago Botanic Garden in May 2020. Titan arums have bloomed at three of Indonesia's botanical gardens: Bogor, Cibodas, and Purwodadi.

Self-pollination was once considered impossible but, in 1992, botanists in Bonn successfully hand-pollinated their plant with its own pollen, using ground-up male flowers, resulting in fruiting and hundreds of seeds from which numerous seedlings were produced and distributed. A titan arum at Gustavus Adolphus College in Minnesota produced viable seed through self-pollination in 2011.

== See also ==
- Largest organisms

== Bibliography ==
- Barthlott, W. & W. Lobin (Eds.) (1998): Amorphophallus titanum – A Monograph. 226 pp, F. Steiner Verlag, Stuttgart (= Trop. subtrop. Pflanzenwelt 99, Akad. Science. Mainz). Download
- Barthlott, W., Szarzynski, J., Vlek, P., Lobin, W., & N. Korotkova (2009): "A torch in the rainforest: thermogenesis of the Titan arum (Amorphophallus titanum)". Plant Biology 11 (4): 499–505 doi:10.1111/j.1438-8677.2008.00147.x
- Bown, Deni (2025). Aroids: Plants of the Arum Family, Third edition . Royal Botanic Gardens, Kew. ISBN 978-1-84246-812-8
- Korotkova, N. & W. Barthlott (2009): "On the thermogenesis of the Titan arum (Amorphophallus titanum)". Plant Signaling & Behavior 4 (11): 1096–1098 doi:10.4161/psb.4.11.9872
- Lobin, W., Neumann, M., Radscheit, M. & W. Barthlott (2007): "The cultivation of Titan Arum (Amorphophallus titanum) – A flagship species for Botanic Gardens", Sibbaldia 5: 69–86.
- Association of Education and Research Greenhouse Newsletter, volume 15, number 1.
