= PlantNetwork =

British and Irish garden education organisation

- Formation: 1996
- Type: Charitable organization
- Legal status: Active
- Region served: United Kingdom and Ireland
- Honorary President: David Rae
- Website: plantnetwork.org
- Remarks: Partnered with Royal Botanic Garden Edinburgh, National Trust for Scotland, and Royal Horticultural Society

PlantNetwork – the plant collections network of Britain and Ireland – is a non-profit charitable organization founded in 1996, that "aims to promote botanical collections in Britain and Ireland as a national resource for research, conservation and education and to facilitate networking and training among holders of plant collections". The current honorary president of the charity is Fellow David Rae, who was also involved in the creation of the journal Sibbaldia in 2003. The collections covered under the charity's support network include the National Trust for Scotland, the Forestry Commission, and the Royal Horticultural Society. PlantNetwork routinely holds conferences and workshops on both how to plant and handle trees and how to keep up material records on trees and their growth. The group also releases a newsletter covering similar information.

PlantNetwork hosted a virtual conference alongside the journal Sibbaldia in October 2020 to promote horticultural accomplishments and to celebrate the 350th anniversary of the Royal Botanic Garden Edinburgh.
