= Sibbaldia (journal) =

- Language: English

Publication details
- History: 2003–present
- Publisher: Royal Botanic Garden Edinburgh

Standard abbreviations
- ISO 4: Sibbaldia

Indexing
- ISSN: 2513-9231
- OCLC no.: 994601662

Links
- Journal homepage

Sibbaldia: The International Journal of Botanic Garden Horticulture is an online journal which publishes "peer-reviewed articles and short notes on the cultivation, conservation, research, botany (but not taxonomic botany), history, landscaping, legislation, management, and curation of plants in botanic and other gardens." It was first published in 2003.

It is published by the Royal Botanic Garden Edinburgh. The journal was named after one of the founders of the organization, Robert Sibbald. In order to reach the same quality as the other publication of the group, the Edinburgh Journal of Botany, they made sure to include the same editorial and peer review standards.

A virtual conference alongside the charity PlantNetwork was conducted in October 2020 to promote horticultural accomplishments and to celebrate the 350th anniversary of the Royal Botanic Garden Edinburgh.
