= The Trials of Life =

BBC nature documentary series written and presented by David Attenborough

- Region 2 DVD cover
- Genre: Nature documentary
- Written by: David Attenborough
- Presented by: David Attenborough
- Composer: George Fenton
- Country of origin: United Kingdom
- Original language: English
- No. of episodes: 12

Production
- Executive producer: Peter Jones
- Running time: 50 minutes (35 minutes)
- Production company: BBC Natural History Unit

Original release
- Network: BBC One
- Release: 3 October – 19 December 1990

Related
- The Living Planet; Life in the Freezer

The Trials of Life: A Natural History of Behaviour is a BBC nature documentary series written and presented by David Attenborough, first transmitted in the United Kingdom from 3 October 1990.

A study in animal behaviour, it was the third in a trilogy of major series (beginning with Life on Earth) that took a broad overview of nature, rather than the more specialised surveys of Attenborough's later productions. Each of the twelve 50-minute episodes features a different aspect of the journey through life, from birth to adulthood and continuation of the species through reproduction.

The series was produced by the BBC Natural History Unit in conjunction with the Australian Broadcasting Corporation and Turner Broadcasting System. The executive producer was Peter Jones and the music was composed by George Fenton.

Part of Attenborough's Life series, it was preceded by The Living Planet (1984) and followed by Life in the Freezer (1993).

== Background ==
The series took over three-and-a-half years to film, during which time Attenborough travelled almost a quarter of a million miles. The production team sought to further push the boundaries of natural history film-making, following on from the advances made in The Living Planet, and were provided with several new challenges.

The sequence of chimpanzees hunting colobus monkeys was only possible through the efforts of Hedwige and Christophe Boesch, who had spent five years studying the apes in the Ivory Coast forests of West Africa.

Meanwhile, a bivouac of army ants in Panama was able to be filmed internally with the aid of a medical endoscope. Furthermore, a new type of camera lens enabled tree ants to be filmed in enlarged close-up just in front of Attenborough – with both subjects in sharp focus. This gave the illusion that the insects were much larger than their actual size.

Filming critical moments in the life of a herd of elephants necessitated the expertise of Cynthia Moss, who had devoted 25 years to researching the animals in Kenya. She was able to advise the production team on the right moments to film specific events.

The camera team had only one chance to film a 60,000-strong flock of waders flying over David Attenborough's head in Norfolk, and the RSPB was enlisted to predict their flight path. By contrast, the Florida scrub jays couldn't have been more co-operative: since the particular group being filmed had been studied closely and were used to humans, a bird could land on Attenborough's hand right on cue.

The inside of a termite mound proved especially challenging for Attenborough: it was so cramped that he could only face in one direction. He therefore had to slowly crawl backwards out of shot when performing re-takes.

Behaviour seen for the first time included the sequence that was eventually selected to illustrate the series' DVD cover: that of a killer whale pouncing on a colony of sea lions on a Patagonian beach and 'playing' with its young prey before consuming it. This meant some risks being taken by the cameramen, as they placed themselves in the water just feet away from the creatures in order to obtain close-ups of an attack run.

== Episodes ==
"The savage, rocky shores of Christmas Island, 200 miles south of Java, in the Indian Ocean. It’s November, the moon is in its third quarter, and the sun is just setting. And in a few hours from now, on this very shore, a thousand million lives will be launched."

— David Attenborough’s opening words

=== 1. "Arriving" ===
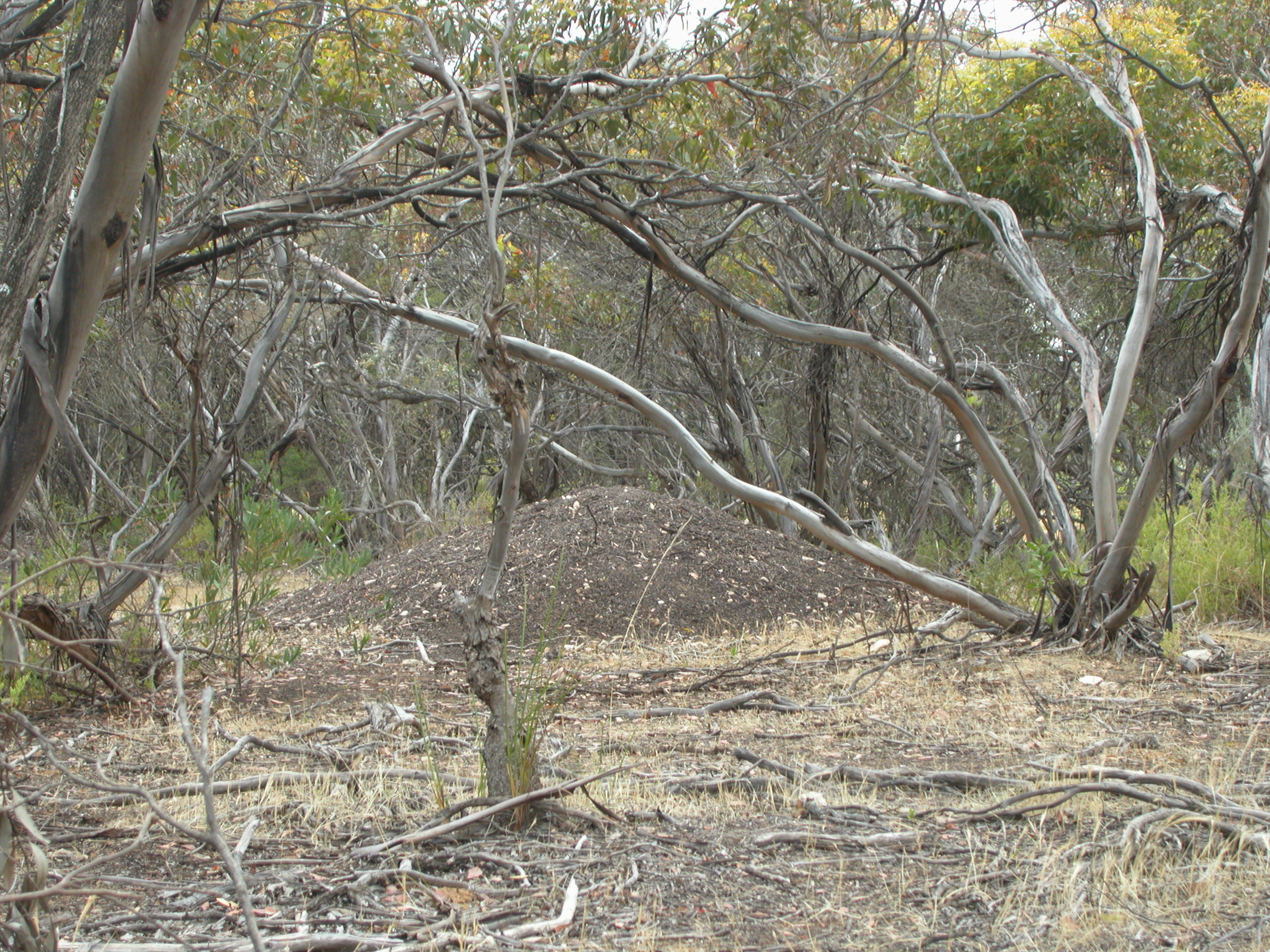
Malleefowl (Leipoa ocellata) lay their eggs in a huge mound of sand.

Broadcast 3 October 1990, the first episode examines the various methods by which creatures come into the world. Attenborough's opening statement alludes to the annual spawning of the Christmas Island red crab, of which there are estimated to be some 120 million. The exercise is all the more hazardous since the species is a land crab, and the eggs have to be deposited in the sea – where the most ancient animals on the planet still live and breed. One of the most prolific aquatic egg producers is the giant clam, but some land animals also lay vast quantities, and the mantis is one example. In the Western United States, Attenborough observes a wasp that digs a burrow, conceals it, and stocks it with fresh caterpillars for her emerging young. The grubs of another start life inside caterpillars, and eat the unsuspecting hosts. The problems of larger animals are illustrated by snow geese in the Arctic, which have to defend their eggs from Arctic foxes. The process of embryonic growth inside the egg, from laying to hatching, is shown in detail. The malleefowl warms its eggs with rotting leaves, and Attenborough demonstrates the care with which it regulates them by adding sand to its mound – to have it kicked back in his (Attenborough's) face. The sea louse is a crustacean that commits suicide: its grubs consume so much of the mother's energies that she dies after birth. Mammals shown giving birth to fully formed young include wildebeest, antelope, sea lions and chinchillas.

=== 2. "Growing Up" ===
Broadcast 10 October 1990, this programme describes the ways that various species care for their young. Attenborough defines childhood as achieving two tasks: growing and surviving. He highlights the elephant seal as an animal that experiences a compressed childhood, being abandoned after three weeks and left for up to another eight alone, while it becomes large enough to be able to swim. For terns, there is safety in numbers as the dense population works together to drive out marauding gulls. The snow geese in the Russian Arctic show intense devotion as they escort their goslings by foot to the coast some 50 kilometres away. Scorpions carry their young on their backs, while a shrew will leave hers under a stone while she goes to feed. The eider duck is one creature that shares responsibility for its offspring: females regularly supervise the ducklings of others in a group. The mara is another that uses a crèche system, as does the bat, whose nurseries can be up to a million strong. The Florida scrub jay has a complex system of raising young known as cooperative breeding, where young stay on as helpers at the nest of their parents. Such behaviour is exhibited on a larger scale by elephants, where all females take an interest in raising a single calf. A chimpanzee's childhood is socially complicated, as an individual must learn how to behave towards others, as well as master the use of tools. Albatrosses must be accomplished fliers as soon as possible – chicks are shown being hunted by tiger sharks.

=== 3. "Finding Food" ===
Broadcast 17 October 1990, the next instalment is devoted to the ways in which animals gather their sustenance. Attenborough begins in the South American rainforest, where the proliferation of animal and plant life does not necessarily make it easy to find food. Some leaves are poisonous, and so those that eat them have to be careful. Other plants use food (or nectar) as a bribe to get their pollen transported, and several species of hummingbird have developed exclusive relationships with certain of them. Fruit is also on offer, again as a means of reproduction, and creatures such as squirrel monkeys eat little else. Meanwhile, parrots and macaws take kaolin as an antidote to their diet of toxic seeds. Attenborough witnesses a 60,000 strong flock of knot and dunlin suddenly take advantage of a low tide to feed on tiny mud-dwelling molluscs. Barracuda hunt small fish, and drive shoals of them into bays to be eaten by pelicans, which are besieged by gulls that attempt to steal their catches. One species of gecko is able to differentiate between worker termites and the more dangerous soldiers. The web of the orb spider is hailed as one of the most elegant food catching devices, and the methods of two others, nephila and its kleptoparasite visitor, argyrodes, are explored in detail. Finally, tropicbirds, their crops full with food en route back to their nests, are ambushed in mid-air by a group of frigatebirds, whose aim is to make them surrender their cargo.

=== 4. "Hunting and Escaping" ===
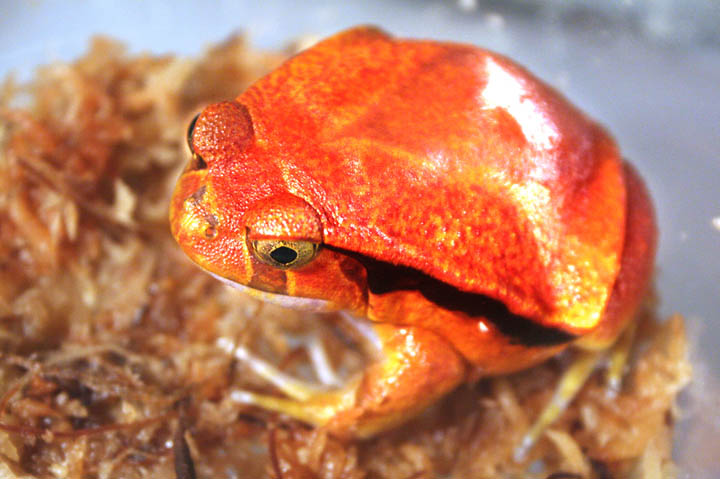
The tomato frog (genus Dyscophus) secretes a harmful substance when threatened.

Broadcast 24 October 1990, this episode looks at those that hunt other creatures and ways of avoiding capture. Attenborough is attacked by a pair of skuas as he approaches their nest, which demonstrates this particular bird's aggressive behaviour, both when taking food and defending its young. Off the shores of Patagonia, the same group of killer whales returns each year to ambush sea lion pups, which stray out of the safer shallow waters. Having grabbed their prey, they take it back out to sea and 'play' with it for some time before killing it. Poison can be used both as a weapon and a deterrent, such as by the viper and tomato frog respectively. Some animals advertise their defensive measures in advance, in case deployment occurs too late. Among them are the skunk, which discharges an appalling smell, and some salamanders that display their toxicity by remaining stationary, with their warning markings visible. Several species of stick insect and their elaborate camouflage are shown. However, none of these methods of protection pose problems to army ants, which can subdue any of their prey, simply by virtue of their size and vast numbers. The Harris hawk is unusual, since it hunts in teams, and a group of six are shown practising their skill in the desert of New Mexico. The final sequence depicts a troop of chimpanzees displaying strategy and co-ordination as it successfully pursues colobus monkeys through a forest in the Ivory Coast.

=== 5. "Finding the Way" ===
Broadcast 31 October 1990, this programme explores forms of navigation. Attenborough starts in Africa at dusk, by describing some of the species that don't rely on sight. The spotted hyena uses its acute sense of smell to guide it while it hunts nocturnally, while galagos urinate on their hands so they can completely mark their movements. Some animals use echolocation and these include swiftlets, bats and river dolphins. By contrast, electric eels use fields of electricity to sense their environment. During the hours of daylight, other methods are employed: the rufous elephant shrew, with its carefully cleared network of pathways, has a sharp mental picture of its habitat – even knowing the various shortcuts with which to evade capture. Attenborough visits the Sahara to illustrate a species that makes the longest overland journey of any insect: cataglyphis, an ant that uses the sun's position to enable it to return to its nest in a straight line. Lobsters in the Bahamas are shown marching in columns to escape stormy waters. In its search for perpetual daylight in which to fish, the Arctic tern makes a 19,000-kilometre journey from one end of the earth to the other. The albatross is highlighted as one of the most skilled navigators: it can travel up to 1300 kilometres over sea in search of food for its chicks, and still find its way back to the nest. Finally, Attenborough stands on a waterfall in Ireland to tell of the three-year, 10,000-kilometre journey made by elvers.

=== 6. "Home Making" ===
Broadcast 7 November 1990, this instalment deals with how animals construct their shelters from the elements and predators. Burrows and holes can provide considerable refuge, and Attenborough inspects the home of the American prairie dog, an elaborate construction that has its own air conditioning system. Silk is such a valuable commodity that those that can't make it steal it instead. The hermit hummingbird uses it to attach its nest to the underside of a leaf, while the Indian tailorbird stitches two leaves together. However, the expert in complex nest-building is the weaverbird which makes its abode from over 1,000 strips of grass that are perfectly interwoven – and dismantling it if it fails to attract a mate. The beaver is responsible for one of the biggest animal dwellings: its wooden lodge that rises from the river bed stays in place from one generation to the next, and so requires constant maintenance. Some stingless bees use their wax and the resin of tree bark to create labyrinthine structures containing various compartments. Mud is also used by several creatures, such as the potter wasp and the cliff swallow. The termites' intricate creations allow for security, heating, air conditioning, self-contained nurseries and gardens, and sanitation systems. Attenborough hails the species as the consummate home maker, and explores a 15-foot colony in West Africa that contains 1.5 million insects: he crawls right inside to examine its method of ventilation.

=== 7. "Living Together" ===
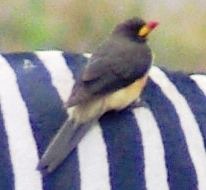
The yellow-billed oxpecker (Buphagus africanus), shown here on a zebra

Broadcast 14 November 1990, this episode focuses on those species that co-operate and depend on (or exploit) others. Spotted deer follow langur monkeys as they travel from tree to tree, eating any leaves that get dropped from above. In return, the deer serve as a lookout when the primates are feeding on the ground. Underwater, a hermit crab is shown adding sea anemones to its shell in order to protect itself from attack by an octopus, and a goby assists a virtually blind shrimp. Fleas, lice and mites are parasites: they share no mutual partnership and instead take advantage of creatures for food or shelter. However, parasites have their predators, and an example are the finches of the Galápagos Islands that clear the resident giant tortoises of their ticks, and oxpeckers, which do the same for giraffes in Africa (and even use its fur to line their nests). Some fish regularly clean others, and wrasse and shrimp appear to specialise in this regard, as do remora, which permanently hang on to their hosts. One parasite that grows inside its host is the fluke, and one is shown gestating inside a snail, having previously been unknowingly eaten. Because it needs to transfer to a bird's gut to develop further, it causes the snail to advertise its presence to allow itself to be consumed – thus completing the circle. However, some microscopic creatures inhabit the stomachs of large herbivores in order to break down the cellulose of their diet, thereby aiding their digestion.

=== 8. "Fighting" ===
Broadcast 21 November 1990, this programme details how fighting – both physical and psychological – is used for food, land or to gain a mate. Territorial conflict is demonstrated by the hummingbird, and Attenborough illustrates its aggressiveness by placing a stuffed specimen nearby, only to have it speared by its opponent's bill. The midas cichlid on the other hand, has no weapons to speak of, and so uses its mouth to hold on for trials of strength. By contrast, the forelegs of a mantis shrimp are powerful enough to crack the shell of another crustacean: therefore disputes or courtship are fraught with danger. Animals that possess lethal food-gathering weapons usually don't use them against one another, as neither side wishes to risk death. For example, one venomous snake will aim to floor the other, rather than bite. Wolves and big cats largely use snarls and body posture to convey their threat. There are no holds barred between rival zebras: kicking and biting is employed until a victor emerges, whereas giraffes slam their necks against each other. Normally peaceful mountain gorillas are shown squabbling when play gets out of hand, and one of them communicates real fright by urinating uncontrollably. Large herbivores that have horns or antlers are naturally inclined to use them to assert their dominance over the females in a herd. Duelling male ibex and Alaskan bull moose undergo some of the most ferocious engagements – sometimes to the death.

=== 9. "Friends and Rivals" ===
Broadcast 28 November 1990, this instalment investigates the ways in which those animals that live in social groups interact with each other. The solitary eagle is contrasted with whooper swans landing in Scotland after a 1,600-kilometre journey from Iceland. Once arrived, they must battle for territory with those already there, and pairs or families are usually victorious. Attenborough uses a group of farmyard chickens to demonstrate a pecking order. Caciques are shown cooperating to deter predators, despite their fights amongst themselves to establish a pecking order. A pride of lions is shown co-operating to subdue a buffalo. Afterwards, each animal peacefully awaits its turn at the carcass. Baboons live in troops of up to 150, and their complex dominance hierarchy is examined in detail. Vampire bats display reciprocal altruism by regurgitating blood for any neighbour that has missed out on a night's feeding. Dwarf mongooses live in family groups of around a dozen. While some look for food or sleep, others are always posted on the lookout for predators and quickly raise the alarm if necessary. Meanwhile, some of the most extreme co-operation is demonstrated by the underground naked mole-rat, whose 80-strong clusters are divided into workers (who tunnel perpetually), soldiers (who only act when danger threatens), and a single queen for breeding. Leafcutter ants are shown transporting their food deep below ground: it has to be planted in a special fungus to convert its indigestible cellulose into something edible, and each stage of the operation is carried out by a different caste of individuals.

=== 10. "Talking to Strangers" ===
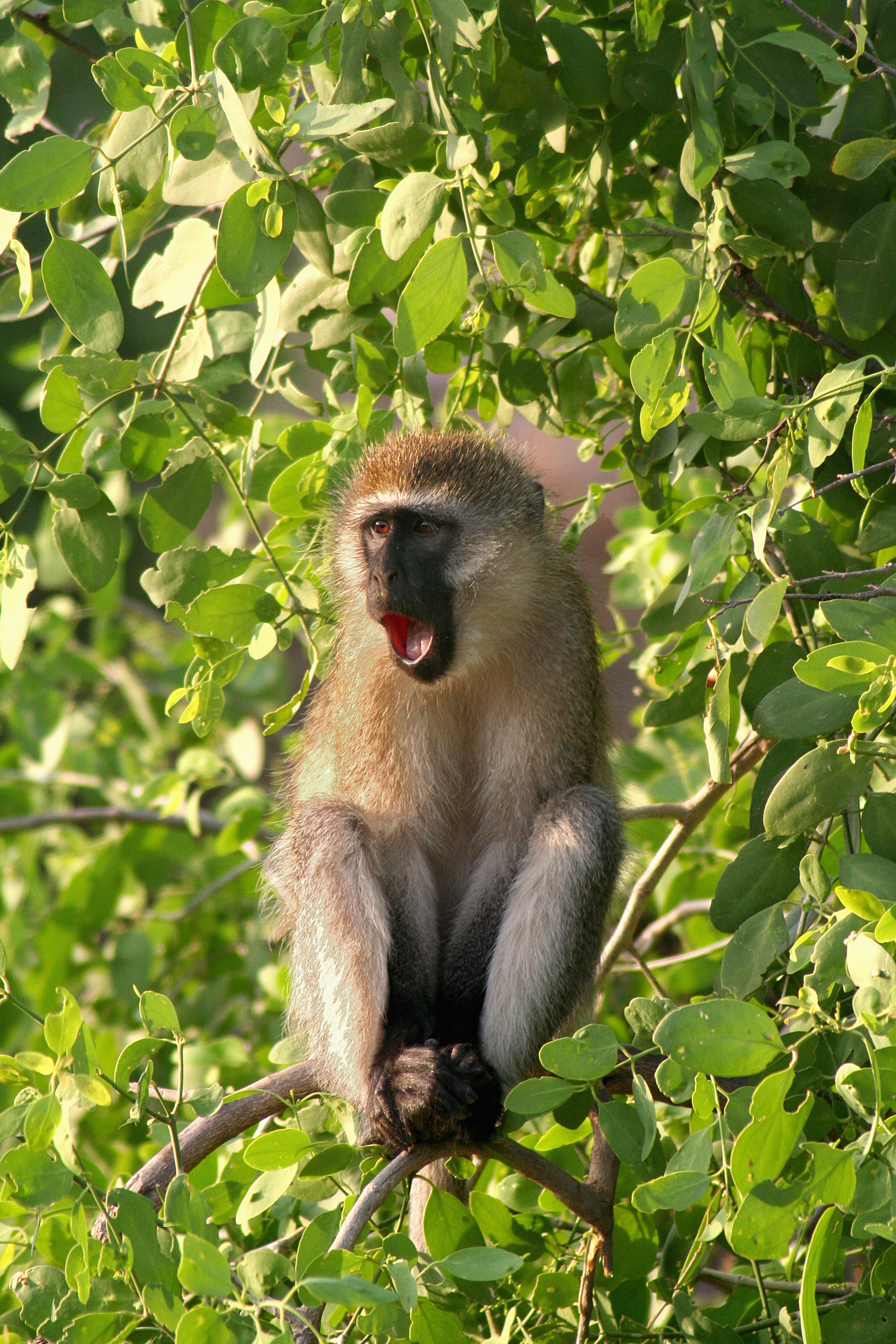
Vervet monkeys have a complex vocabulary of alarm signals.

Broadcast 5 December 1990, this episode concentrates on animal communication. In Kenya, Attenborough accompanies a tribesman who calls to a honeyguide, which in turn answers him and leads the pair to a bees' nest. The tribesman extracts the honey, and some is left to reward the bird. African hunting dogs are shown hunting gazelles, of which the target is the individual that leaps lowest. Larks evade merlin by sending a similar message: by continuing to sing while being chased, it tells the pursuer that its prey is fit and therefore will be difficult to catch (see handicap principle). (In 80% of cases this turns out to be true.) Vervet monkeys' cries are among the most complex. Their utterances are effectively words: a vocabulary that defines each of their predators, so an alarm call is specific to a particular threat. Some creatures transmit their presence by display, and Attenborough observes thousands of fireflies illuminating the darkness. Sounds travel faster and further underwater, and over 200 species of fish use them to communicate. In turn, sea lions have become adept at sensing their proximity. However, the most visual aquatic animal is the squid, which uses colour change and posture to communicate. Finally, Attenborough swims with spotted dolphins. They converse with a series of ultrasonic clicks, and each has a family call inherited from its mother: effectively a 'surname'. They also use normal sound, body posture and touch – in short, in terms of ability to communicate, they are man's closest rival.

=== 11. "Courting" ===
Broadcast 12 December 1990, this programme surveys the methods employed in attracting a mate, mainly those of birds. The Indian florican inhabits long grass, and so is difficult to see. In order to gain attention, it 'trampolines' in the same spot for up to 400 times a day. Whales sing to their prospective partners, and the female's calls can be heard by suitors for over eight kilometres. When animals send out signals of attraction, they must also ensure that they don't entice the wrong species, and so have markings that differ prominently. Attenborough highlights the booby as an example: there are around half a dozen species, all of which may occupy the same island. However, the blue-footed booby reassures its chosen mate by continually lifting its feet. Tropicbirds and marsh harriers are shown providing graceful aerobatic displays, while the sac-winged bat uses a strong perfume to lure a companion. Among those birds that produce the most spectacular visual displays are the lyrebird (which also has an elaborate song), the peacock, and the riflebird (and indeed most other birds of paradise). The bowerbird invites potential partners to inspect its bower: a specially prepared area that contains a hut or walkway augmented by strikingly coloured objects. The intricate dances performed by manakins in Trinidad are also examined. Finally, Attenborough observes the topi's display courts, whose sharply defined boundaries are jealously guarded by rival males.

=== 12. "Continuing the Line" ===
Broadcast 19 December 1990, the final instalment illustrates how species fulfil their ultimate raison d'être and ensure that their genes are passed on to the next generation. It is a universal problem, but one which has given rise to a variety of solutions. Barnacles cannot move, but each has both male and female sex cells, allowing each neighbour to be a potential mate. On the other end of the scale, a female elephant undergoes a long pregnancy – 22 months – and so wishes to ensure that her calf is fathered by a strong and proven male. She is therefore very choosy about her partner. A female chinchilla is even more so, and rejects an unwanted suitor by squirting urine in its face. Mating is a dangerous business when weapons are involved, and a male tarantula approaches his intended with trepidation. Only when he succeeds in holding off her poison fangs is he able to progress any further. For some, the right moments to get together are few and far between: a male crab, for example, must wait until a female moults her shell before he is able to fertilise her. Male sea lions are shown fighting over a harem, and some use the battle to their advantage by making off with reluctant females. Attenborough observes that the monogamous relationships enjoyed by humans are rare within the animal kingdom, but he highlights the royal albatross as a "beautiful" exception. The pair of birds featured met as five-year-olds, and have been together for twenty years.

"If you watch animals objectively for any length of time, you're driven to the conclusion that their main aim in life is to pass on their genes to the next generation. Most do so directly, by breeding. In the few examples that don't do so by design, they do it indirectly, by helping a relative with whom they share a great number of their genes. And in as much as the legacy that human beings pass on to the next generation is not only genetic but to a unique degree cultural, we do the same. So animals and ourselves, to continue the line, will endure all kinds of hardship, overcome all kinds of difficulties, and eventually the next generation appears."

— David Attenborough, in closing

== Home media ==
The series is available in the UK for Regions 2 and 4 as a 4-disc DVD set (BBCDVD1428, released 27 September 2004) and as part of The Life Collection. Erroneously entitled Trials of Life, its sole extra feature is a 50-minute documentary: The Making of The Trials of Life. It was previously released in 2002 as an abridged 3-disc set, with each episode cut to 35 minutes. The series was released on Blu-ray in the UK on 12 November 2012.

The accompanying book, The Trials of Life: A Natural History of Behaviour by David Attenborough (ISBN 0-00-219912-2), was published by BBC Books on 4 October 1990 and was shortlisted for the 1991 Rhône-Poulenc Prize. In 2023, the book was given an updated rerelease (ISBN 9780008579920).
