= The Private Life of Plants =

BBC nature documentary series

- Region 2 DVD cover
- Genre: Nature documentary
- Written by: David Attenborough
- Presented by: David Attenborough
- Composer: Richard Grassby-Lewis
- Country of origin: United Kingdom
- Original language: English
- No. of episodes: 6

Production
- Executive producer: Mike Salisbury
- Producer: Neil Nightingale
- Production location: Worldwide
- Running time: 50 minutes
- Production companies: BBC Natural History Unit; TBS Productions

Original release
- Network: BBC One
- Release: 11 January – 15 February 1995

Related
- Life in the Freezer; The Life of Birds

The Private Life of Plants is a BBC nature documentary series written and presented by David Attenborough, first shown in the United Kingdom from 11 January 1995.

A study of the growth, movement, reproduction and survival of plants, it was the second of Attenborough's specialised surveys following his major trilogy that began with Life on Earth. Each of the six 50-minute episodes discusses aspects of a plant's life-cycle, using examples from around the world.

The series was produced by the BBC Natural History Unit in conjunction with Turner Broadcasting. The executive producer was Mike Salisbury and the music was composed by Richard Grassby-Lewis. In 1995, it won a George Foster Peabody Award in the category "Television".

Part of Attenborough's Life series of programmes, it was preceded by Life in the Freezer (1993), and followed by The Life of Birds (1998).

== Background ==
The series utilises time-lapse sequences extensively in order to grant insights that would otherwise be almost impossible. Plants live on a different time scale, and even though their life is highly complex and often surprising, most of it is invisible to humans unless events that happen over months or even years are shown within seconds. Like many traditional wildlife documentaries, it makes use of almost no computer animation. The series also discusses fungi, although as it is pointed out, these do not belong to the kingdom of plants.

The mechanisms of evolution are taught transparently by showing the advantages of various types of plant behaviour in action. The adaptations are often complex, as it becomes clear that the environment to which plants must adapt comprises not just soil, water and weather, but also other plants, fungi, insects and other animals, and even humans. The series shows that co-operative strategies are often much more effective than predatory ones, as these often lead to the prey developing methods of self-defence – from plants growing spikes to insects learning to recognise mimicry. Yet humans can work around all these rules of nature, so Attenborough concludes with a plea to preserve plants, in the interest of self-preservation.

In the 2002 documentary Life on Air, Keith Scholey, the head of the BBC Natural History Unit, relates that he and his team had been wondering about an ecology series that included plants, and found that Attenborough had been thinking along the same lines:

"So we went to his house and David, as always, listened to our idea and, you know, nodded and was very complimentary about it and said that 'Actually, I was thinking about something a little bit bolder.' And sure enough, by the end of lunch, we'd all signed up to do six hours on plants."

In the same programme, Attenborough also confessed that he conceived the series partly to realise a long-cherished ambition: to visit Mount Roraima, which is featured in the last episode.

Attenborough knew that the subject matter had not been covered in depth on television before, and in his autobiography, Life on Air, told of how he hit on the idea of time-lapse photography to illustrate it:

"There were, of course, gardening programmes on the BBC's schedules, but they did not deal with the basic facts of botany, or explain how plants feed, how they reproduce and distribute themselves, how they form alliances with particular animals. The reason was only too obvious. How could you construct the dramatic narratives needed for a successful television documentary series if your main characters are rooted to the ground and barely move? Thinking about this, it suddenly struck me that plants do move and very dramatically."

Outdoors time-lapse photography presents a unique set of challenges: the varying light and temperatures in particular can cause many problems. To film bluebells under a canopy of beech trees, for example, cameraman Richard Kirby covered them with a thick canvas tent that was lit from within to simulate daylight. He then used a motion-controlled camera to obtain a tracking shot, moving it slightly after each exposure.

== Episodes ==
"Midwinter, and the countryside is so still, it seems almost lifeless. But these trees and bushes and grasses around me are living organisms just like animals. And they have to face very much the same sort of problems as animals face throughout their lives if they're to survive. They have to fight one another, they have to compete for mates, they have to invade new territories. But the reason that we're seldom aware of these dramas is that plants of course live on a different time-scale."

— David Attenborough’s opening words

=== "Travelling" ===
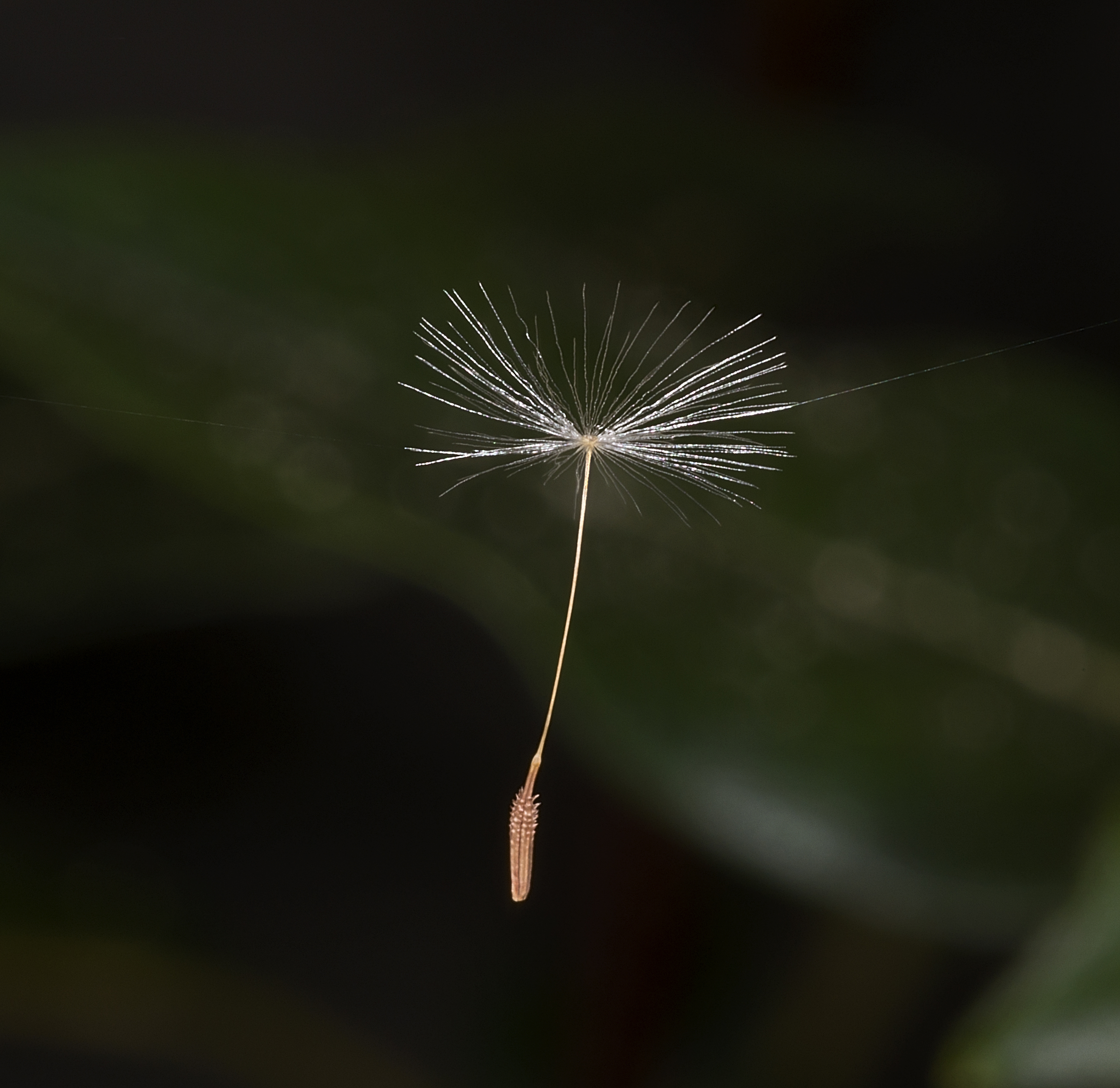
Dandelion seeds are dispersed by the wind.

Broadcast 11 January 1995, the first episode looks at how plants are able to move. The bramble is an aggressive example: it advances forcefully from side to side and, once settled on its course, there is little that can stand in its way. An altogether faster species is the birdcage plant, which inhabits Californian sand dunes. When its location becomes exposed, it shifts at great speed to another one with the assistance of wind – and it is this that allows many forms of vegetation to distribute their seeds. While not a plant, the spores of fungi are also spread in a similar fashion. One of the most successful (and intricate) flowers to use the wind is the dandelion, whose seeds travel with the aid of 'parachutes'. They are needed to travel miles away from their parents, who are too densely packed to allow any new arrivals. Trees have the advantage of height to send their seeds further, and the cottonwood is shown as a specialist in this regard. The humidity of the tropical rainforest creates transportation problems, and the liana-species Alsomitra macrocarpa is one plant whose seeds are aerodynamic 'gliders'. Some, such as those of the sycamore, take the form of 'helicopters', while others, such as the squirting cucumber release their seeds by 'exploding'. Water is also a widely used method of propulsion. The tropical sea bean Entada gigas has one of the biggest fruits of all plants and is dispersed by water streams. However, most plants use living couriers, whether they be dogs, humans and other primates, ants or birds, etc., and to that end, they use colour and smell to signify when they are ripe for picking.

=== "Growing" ===
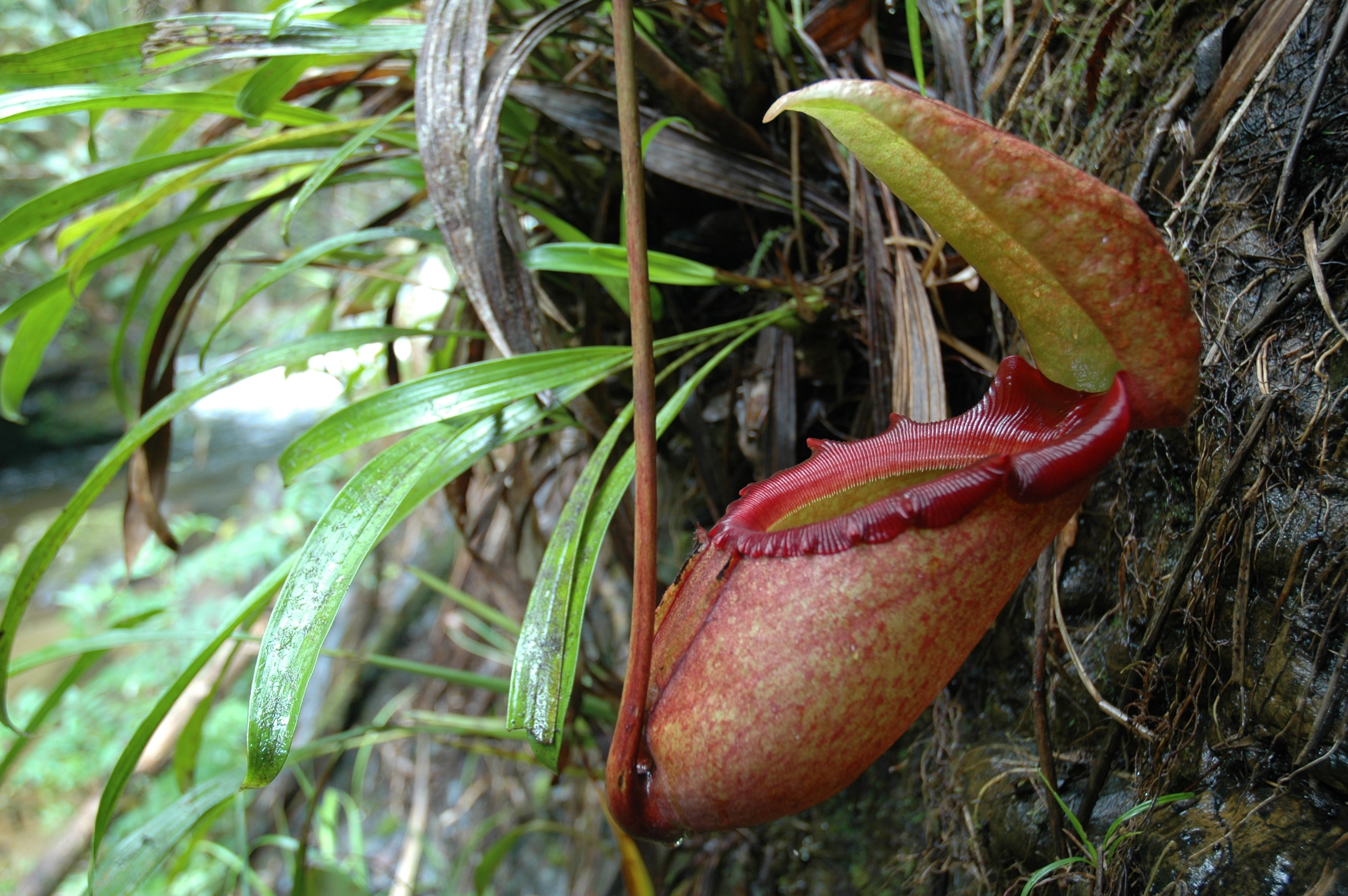
A lower pitcher of N. rajah

Broadcast 18 January 1995, this programme is about how plants gain their sustenance. Sunlight is one of the essential requirements if a seed is to germinate, and Attenborough highlights the cheese plant as an example whose young shoots head for the nearest tree trunk and then climb to the top of the forest canopy, developing its leaves en route. Using sunshine, air, water and a few minerals, the leaves are, in effect, the "factories" that produce food. However, some, such as the begonia, can thrive without much light. To gain moisture, plants typically use their roots to probe underground. Trees pump water up pipes that run inside their trunks, and Attenborough observes that a sycamore can do this at the rate of 450 litres an hour – in total silence. Too much rainfall can clog up a leaf's pores, and many have specially designed 'gutters' to cope with it. However, their biggest threat is from animals, and some require extreme methods of defence, such as spines, camouflage, or poison. Some can move quickly to deter predators: the mimosa can fold its leaves instantly when touched, and the Venus flytrap eats insects by closing its leaves around its prey when triggered. Another carnivorous plant is the trumpet pitcher that snares insects when they fall into its tubular leaves. Attenborough visits Borneo to see the largest pitcher of them all, Nepenthes rajah, whose traps contain up to two litres of water and have been known to kill small rodents.

=== "Flowering" ===
Broadcast 25 January 1995, the next installment is devoted to the ways in which plants reproduce. Pollen and a stigma are the two components needed for fertilisation. Most plants carry both these within their flowers and rely on animals to transport the pollen from one to the stigma of another. To do this, they attract their couriers with colour, scent and nectar. It isn't just birds that help pollination: some mammals and reptiles also do so. However, it is mostly insects that are recruited to carry out the task. To ensure that pollen is not wasted by being delivered to the wrong flower, some species of plant have developed exclusive relationships with their visitors, and the gentian and its attendant carpenter bees is one example. Since pollen can be expensive to produce in terms of calories, some plants, such as orchids, ration it by means of pollinia and a strategically placed landing platform. Other orchids offer no reward for pollination, but instead mislead their guests by mimicking their markings and aroma, thus enticing males to 'mate' with them (Pseudocopulation). The most extreme fertilisation method is one of imprisonment, and one plant that uses it is the dead horse arum. It is often found near gull colonies, and mimics the appearance and smell of rotting flesh. Blow-flies are attracted to it, and are forced to stay the night before being allowed to depart in the morning, laden with pollen. Finally, Attenborough introduces the world's largest inflorescence: that of the titan arum.

=== "The Social Struggle" ===
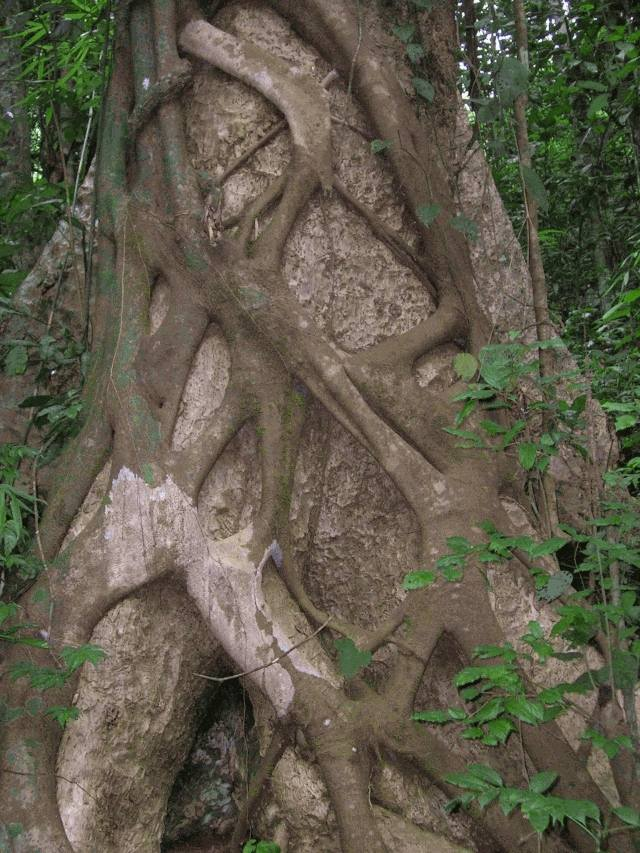
The strangler fig climbs up the trunks of other trees.

Broadcast 1 February 1995, this episode examines how plants either share environments harmoniously or compete for dominance within them. Attenborough highlights the 1987 storm and the devastation it caused. However, for some species, it was that opportunity for which they had lain dormant for many years. The space left by uprooted trees is soon filled by others who move relatively swiftly towards the light. The oak is one of the strongest and longest-lived, and other, lesser plants nearby must wait until the spring to flourish before the light above is extinguished by leaves. Tropical forests are green throughout the year, so brute force is needed for a successful climb to the top of the canopy: the rattan is an example that has the longest stem of any plant. As its name suggests, the strangler fig 'throttles' its host by growing around it and cutting off essential water and light. Some can take advantage of a fallen tree by setting down roots on the now horizontal trunk and getting nutriment from the surrounding moss and the fungi on the dead bark. The mountain ash (eucalyptus regnans) grows so tall, that regeneration becomes a considerable problem. It is easily flammable, so its solution is to shed its seeds during a forest fire and sacrifice itself. It therefore relies on the periodic near-destruction of its surroundings in order to survive. Attenborough observes that catastrophes such as fire and drought, while initially detrimental to wildlife, eventually allow for deserted habitats to be reborn.

=== "Living Together" ===
Broadcast 8 February 1995, the fifth programme explores the alliances formed between the animal and plant worlds. Attenborough dives into Australia's Great Barrier Reef and contrasts the nocturnal feeding of coral, on microscopic creatures, with its daytime diet of algae. Some acacias are protected by ants, which will defend their refuge from any predator. Besides accommodation, the guards are rewarded with nectar and, from certain species, protein for their larvae as well. Fungi feed on plants but can also provide essential nutriment to saplings (Mycorrhiza). The connection is never broken throughout a tree's life and a quarter of the sugars and starches produced in its leaves is channelled back to its fungal partners. Meanwhile, fungi that feed on dead wood leave a hollow trunk, which also benefits the tree. Orchids enjoy a similar affiliation. Lichens are the product of a relationship between fungi and a photosynthetic associate, usually algae. They are extremely slow-growing, and a graveyard is the perfect location to discover their exact longevity. Mistletoe is a hemiparasite that obtains its moisture from a host tree, while using own leaves to manufacture food. Its seeds are deposited on another by the mistletoe tyrannulet, following digestion of the fruit. The dodder (Cuscuta) is also parasitic, generally favouring nettles, and siphons its nourishment through periodic 'plugs' along its stem. The rafflesia has no stem or leaves and only emerges from its host in order to bloom – and it produces the largest single flower: one metre across.

=== "Surviving" ===
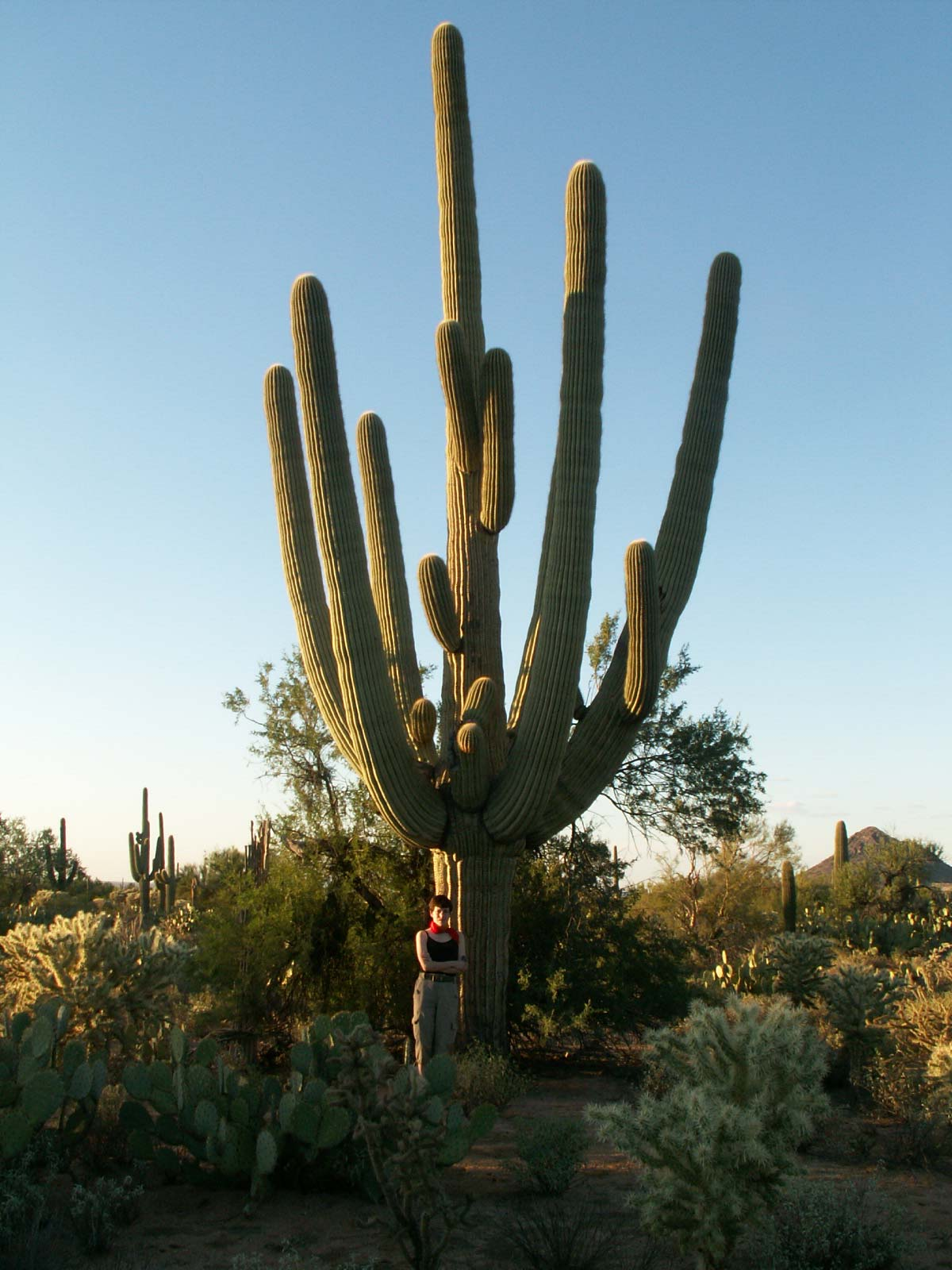
A saguaro cactus in Arizona.

Broadcast 15 February 1995, the final episode deals with plants that live in hostile environments. Attenborough visits Ellesmere Island, north of the Arctic Circle, to demonstrate that even in a place that is unconducive to life, it can be found. Algae and lichens grow in or on rock, and during summer, when the ice melts, flowers are much more apparent. However, they must remain close to the ground to stay out of the chilling wind. In the Tasmanian mountains, plants conserve heat by growing into 'cushions' that act as solar panels, with as many as a million individual shoots grouped together as one. Others, such as the lobelia in Mount Kenya, have a 'fur coat' of dense hairs on their leaves. The saguaro cactus in the Sonoran Desert flourishes because of its ability to retain vast amounts of water, which can't be lost through leaves because it has none. Many desert dwellers benefit from an accelerated life cycle, blooming rapidly within weeks after rainfall. Conversely, Mount Roraima is one of the wettest places on Earth. It is a huge sandstone plateau with high waterfalls and nutrients are continuously washed away, so plants have to adapt their diet if they are to survive. A bladderwort is shown invading a bromeliad. Inhabitants of lakes have other problems to contend with: those that dominate the surface will proliferate, and the Amazon water lily provides an apt illustration. Attenborough ends the series with an entreaty for the conservation of plant species.

"Ever since we arrived on this planet as a species, we've cut them down, dug them up, burnt them and poisoned them. Today we're doing so on a greater scale than ever [...] We destroy plants at our peril. Neither we nor any other animal can survive without them. The time has now come for us to cherish our green inheritance, not to pillage it – for without it, we will surely perish."

— David Attenborough, in closing

== DVD and book ==
The series is available in the UK for Regions 2 and 4 as a 2-disc DVD (BBCDVD1235, released 1 September 2003) and as part of The Life Collection. The extra features include a promotional interview for the series given by David Attenborough on the BBC children's series Blue Peter, and a 'behind the scenes' vignette.

The accompanying book, The Private Life of Plants by David Attenborough (ISBN 0-563-37023-8), was published by BBC Books on 8 December 1994.
