= List of Nova episodes (seasons 21–40) =

Nova is an American science documentary television series produced by WGBH Boston for PBS. Some episodes were not originally produced for PBS, but were acquired from other sources such as the BBC. Most episodes are 60-minutes long.

== Episodes ==
=== Season 21: 1993–94 ===
| No. overall | No. in season | Title | Original release date | Prod. code |
|---|---|---|---|---|
| 381 | 1 | "The NOVA Quiz" | October 5, 1993 | 2010 |
Please add a Plot Summary here and in the episodes below, replacing this text. For guidance, see How to write a plot summary. Episode summaries must be expressed in your own words. Do NOT submit content you find from another web site as it is plagiarism and likely a copyright violation, which Wikipedia cannot accept and will be removed or reverted. Superficially modifying copyrighted content or closely paraphrasing it, even if the source is cited, still constitutes a copyright violation. As per the Television Plot Manual of Style, summaries should be about 100 to 200 words in length, and those substantially less than 100 words are most likely to be scrutinized for possible copyright violation.
| 382 | 2 | "Wanted: Butch and Sundance" | October 12, 1993 | 2011 |
| 383 | 3 | "Secrets of the Psychics" | October 19, 1993 | 2012 |
| 384 | 4 | "Dying to Breathe" | October 26, 1993 | 2013 |
| 385 | 5 | "Shadow of the Condor" | November 2, 1993 | 2014 |
| 386 | 6 | "The Real Jurassic Park" | November 9, 1993 | 2015 |
Michael Crighton's novel Jurassic Park and its movie adaptation are based on the hypothetical that dinosaurs could be resurrected from ancient DNA. Various people are interviewed about the science and ethics of this idea.
| 387 | 7 | "Roller Coaster!" | November 16, 1993 | 2016 |
Please add a Plot Summary here, as per WP:PLOTSUM & MOS:TVPLOT. Note: First aired on Channel Four in 1992.
| 388 | 8 | "Mysterious Crash of Flight 201" | November 30, 1993 | 2017 |
| 389 | 9 | "Great Moments from NOVA" | December 7, 1993 | 2018 |
| 390 | 10 | "The Best Mind Since Einstein" | December 21, 1993 | 2019 |
Please add a Plot Summary here, as per WP:PLOTSUM & MOS:TVPLOT. Note: Edited and re-narrated from the two-part Horizon episode, "No Ordinary Genius".
| 391 | 11 | "Stranger in the Mirror" | December 28, 1993 | 2020 |
| 392 | 12 | "Codebreakers" | January 18, 1994 | 2101 |
| 393 | 13 | "Dinosaurs of the Gobi" | January 25, 1994 | 2102 |
| 394 | 14 | "Daredevils of the Sky" | February 1, 1994 | 2103 |
| 395 | 15 | "Journey to Kilimanjaro" | February 8, 1994 | 2104 |
| 396 | 16 | "Can Chimps Talk?" | February 15, 1994 | 2105 |
| 397 | 17 | "In Search of Human Origins: The Story of Lucy" (1 of 3) | February 28, 1994 | 2106 |
| 398 | 18 | "In Search of Human Origins: Surviving in Africa" (2 of 3) | March 1, 1994 | 2107 |
| 399 | 19 | "In Search of Human Origins: The Creative Revolution" (3 of 3) | March 2, 1994 | 2108 |
| 400 | 20 | "Can China Kick the Habit?" | April 12, 1994 | 2109 |
| 401 | 21 | "Aircraft Carrier!" | April 19, 1994 | 2110 |

=== Season 22: 1994–95 ===
| No. overall | No. in season | Title | Original release date | Prod. code |
|---|---|---|---|---|
| 402 | 1 | "The Great Wildlife Heist" | October 11, 1994 | 2111 |
Please add a Plot Summary here and in the episodes below, replacing this text. For guidance, see How to write a plot summary. Episode summaries must be expressed in your own words. Do NOT submit content you find from another web site as it is plagiarism and likely a copyright violation, which Wikipedia cannot accept and will be removed or reverted. Superficially modifying copyrighted content or closely paraphrasing it, even if the source is cited, still constitutes a copyright violation. As per the Television Plot Manual of Style, summaries should be about 100 to 200 words in length, and those substantially less than 100 words are most likely to be scrutinized for possible copyright violation.
| 403 | 2 | "The Secret of the Wild Child" | October 18, 1994 | 2112 |
| 404 | 3 | "Haunted Cry of a Long Gone Bird" | October 25, 1994 | 2113 |
| 405 | 4 | "What's New About Menopause" | November 1, 1994 | 2114 |
| 406 | 5 | "The Tribe that Time Forgot" | November 8, 1994 | 2115 |
| 407 | 6 | "Killer Quake!" | November 15, 1994 | 2116 |
| 408 | 7 | "Buried in Ash" | November 29, 1994 | 2117 |
| 409 | 8 | "Rescue Mission in Space" | December 6, 1994 | 2118 |
| 410 | 9 | "Journey to the Sacred Sea" | December 20, 1994 | 2119 |
| 411 | 10 | "In Search of the First Language" | December 27, 1994 | 2120 |
| 412 | 11 | "Mammoths of the Ice Age" | January 10, 1995 | 2201 |
| 413 | 12 | "Vikings in America" | January 24, 1995 | 2202 |
| 414 | 13 | "Little Creatures Who Run the World" | January 31, 1995 | 2203 |
| 415 | 14 | "Nazi Designers of Death" | February 7, 1995 | 2204 |
| 416 | 15 | "Siamese Twins" | February 14, 1995 | 2205 |
| 417 | 16 | "Mystery of the Senses: Hearing" (1 of 5) | February 19, 1995 | TBA |
Part 1 of 5: A Nova Miniseries with Diane Ackerman. What we hear can create a mood, build communication, and guide our physical movement. In this episode, series host and naturalist Diane Ackerman investigates musical communication in the movies, in relationships with babies, and in Maori culture. She presents information about how our ears process and protect us from sounds, and explores new medical technology that mimics some of those functions to enable deaf people to hear. She also studies the hearing abilities of several types of animals and discovers how an owl uses its ears to locate prey in total darkness.
| 418 | 17 | "Mystery of the Senses: Smell" (2 of 5) | February 20, 1995 | TBA |
Part 2 of 5: For centuries, many cultures have used scents and odors for a variety of purposes. From the earliest civilizitions, humans have created and used scents to mask unpleasant odors and to enhance other, more appealing ones. To find out what makes humans so responsive to natural and synthesized fragrances, series host and naturalist Diane Ackerman investigates the role of incense in Oman, visits a perfume factory in New Jersey, traces a smell from outside the body to the part of the brain that stores memories and emotions, and examines how different animals use their sense of smell.
| 419 | 18 | "Mystery of the Senses: Taste" (3 of 5) | February 21, 1995 | TBA |
Part 3 of 5: Eating sustains life. However, our tongues also enable us to taste foods, so we eat the foods we like; and our cultures assign values to foods, so we often eat as part of a ritual. In this episode, series host and naturalist Diane Ackerman explores the biology and the rituals of taste around the world. In France, a master chef divulges his secrets; in Mexico, a family prepares a meal for the Day of the Dead; in a Japanese restaurant, Ackerman looks into why some people consider potentially poisonous fish to be a delicacy; and in Connecticut, a scientist maps our taste buds.
| 420 | 19 | "Mystery of the Senses: Touch" (4 of 5) | February 22, 1995 | TBA |
Part 4 of 5: Touch contributes dramatically to our feeling of well-being. In this episode, Ackerman explores how touching and being touched promotes physical and psychological growth in young monkeys and humans. She also explores human responses to touch in massage, relationships, and art; and cultural perspectives on touch in social taboos, hugging, and kissing. To explain our biological responses, series host and naturalist Diane Ackerman introduces a scientist who has identified how the brain's sensory map operates. His research has led to the groundbreaking discovery that even if a person loses a limb, the brain will respond as if that limb is being touched.
| 421 | 20 | "Mystery of the Senses: Vision" (5 of 5) | February 22, 1995 | TBA |
Part 5 of 5: Vision allows us to see color, motion, form, and shadow. Our brain interprets images so that we understand what we see. In this episode, series host and naturalist Diane Ackerman considers both the biology of vision and the mental processes and perceptions that govern vision. She seeks answers to how the brain makes sense of optical illusions, what the importance of eye placement is in predatory animals, how artists use light and color, and why the sky is blue.
| 422 | 21 | "The Universe Within" | March 7, 1995 | 2206 |
| 423 | 22 | "Making of a Doctor" | May 3, 1995 | 2207 |
| 424 | 23 | "Fast Cars" | May 23, 1995 | 2208 |

=== Season 23: 1995–96 ===
| No. overall | No. in season | Title | Original release date | Prod. code |
|---|---|---|---|---|
| 425 | 1 | "Anastasia: Dead or Alive?" | October 10, 1995 | 2209 |
Please add a Plot Summary here and in the episodes below, replacing this text. For guidance, see How to write a plot summary. Episode summaries must be expressed in your own words. Do NOT submit content you find from another web site as it is plagiarism and likely a copyright violation, which Wikipedia cannot accept and will be removed or reverted. Superficially modifying copyrighted content or closely paraphrasing it, even if the source is cited, still constitutes a copyright violation. As per the Television Plot Manual of Style, summaries should be about 100 to 200 words in length, and those substantially less than 100 words are most likely to be scrutinized for possible copyright violation.
| 426 | 2 | "Venus Unveiled" | October 17, 1995 | 2210 |
| 427 | 3 | "Hawaii: Born of Fire" | October 24, 1995 | 2211 |
| 428 | 4 | "The Doomsday Asteroid" | October 31, 1995 | 2212 |
| 429 | 5 | "Lightning!" | November 7, 1995 | 2213 |
Lightning! takes you on a high voltage trip into the most electrically charged weather in the world culminating in a dazzling lightning show set to music that rivals the most extraordinary fireworks display. The program also visits with some of lightning's tragic victims who though they were out of harm's way.
| 430 | 6 | "Hunt for the Serial Arsonist" | November 14, 1995 | 2214 |
| 431 | 7 | "Treasures of the Great Barrier Reef" | November 28, 1995 | 2215 |
| 432 | 8 | "Race to Catch a Buckyball" | December 19, 1995 | 2216 |
In 1985 a chemist looking at stardust, paired with one searching for brand new materials, stumbled across what science said could not exist – a third form of carbon. They named the soccer ball-shaped molecules "Buckminsterfullerene" after the architect who invented the geodesic dome. Today "Buckyballs," as the molecules are playfully known, are revolutionizing chemistry and promise countless technological applications. NOVA traces this remarkable tale of serendipity in scientific discovery.
| 433 | 9 | "Can Buildings Make You Sick?" | December 26, 1995 | 2217 |
| 434 | 10 | "Terror in the Mine Fields" | January 9, 1996 | 2301 |
Please add a Plot Summary here, as per WP:PLOTSUM & MOS:TVPLOT.
| 435 | 11 | "The Day the Earth Shook" | January 16, 1996 | 2302 |
| 436 | 12 | "B-29 Frozen in Time" | January 30, 1996 | 2303 |
During 1947, in a secret Cold War era mission, the B-29 bomber, Kee Bird, was forced to crash land in a remote tundra north of Thule. Despite this, the plane remained preserved in good condition, awaiting the day that, like its crew, it too could be rescued. In 1994, aviator Darryl Greenamyer set forth with an expedition to repair and fly the plane out of Greenland. Due to multiple delays caused by poor weather, issues with the de Havilland Caribou supply plane, and the hospitalization and later death of chief mechanic, Rick Kriege, the crew was unable to make its summer deadline, stranding the plane in the Arctic tundra. Undeterred, Darryl returned the following winter with new experts to try again. Unfortunately, during final take-off, the plane’s APU fuel tank got dislodged, spilling on the APU and setting the Kee Bird on fire, doomed to rest at the bottom of a frozen lake for the rest of time. Note: Previously shown in the UK Channel 4 in the Encounters series as "Treasure of the Humboldt Glacier" on April 23, 1995.
| 437 | 13 | "Plague Fighters" | February 6, 1996 | 2304 |
| 438 | 14 | "War Machines of Tomorrow" | February 20, 1996 | 2305 |
| 439 | 15 | "Kidnapped by UFOs?" | February 27, 1996 | 2306 |
| 440 | 16 | "Flood!" | March 26, 1996 | 2307 |
| 441 | 17 | "Dr. Spock the Baby Doc" | April 2, 1996 | 2308 |
| 442 | 18 | "Warriors of the Amazon" | April 9, 1996 | 2309 |
| 443 | 19 | "Bombing of America" | April 16, 1996 | 2310 |

=== Season 24: 1996–97 ===
| No. overall | No. in season | Title | Original release date | Prod. code |
|---|---|---|---|---|
| 444 | 1 | "Einstein Revealed" | October 1, 1996 | 2311 |
Please add a Plot Summary here and in the episodes below, replacing this text. For guidance, see How to write a plot summary. Episode summaries must be expressed in your own words. Do NOT submit content you find from another web site as it is plagiarism and likely a copyright violation, which Wikipedia cannot accept and will be removed or reverted. Superficially modifying copyrighted content or closely paraphrasing it, even if the source is cited, still constitutes a copyright violation. As per the Television Plot Manual of Style, summaries should be about 100 to 200 words in length, and those substantially less than 100 words are most likely to be scrutinized for possible copyright violation.
| 445 | 2 | "Lost City of Arabia" | October 8, 1996 | 2312 |
| 446 | 3 | "Three Men and a Balloon" | October 15, 1996 | 2313 |
| 447 | 4 | "Secrets of Making Money" | October 22, 1996 | 2314 |
| 448 | 5 | "Top Gun Over Moscow" | November 12, 1996 | 2315 |
| 449 | 6 | "Shark Attack" | November 19, 1996 | 2316 |
| 450 | 7 | "Odyssey of Life: The Ultimate Journey" (1 of 3) | November 24, 1996 | 2317 |
Part 1 of 3: The development of animal embryos reflects the evolution of species.
| 451 | 8 | "Odyssey of Life: The Unknown World" (2 of 3) | November 25, 1996 | 2318 |
Part 2 of 3: Mites, beetles and borers that share man's surroundings are observed in this look at microscopic intruders including bacteria, viruses and fungi.
| 452 | 9 | "Odyssey of Life: The Photographer's Secrets" (3 of 3) | November 26, 1996 | 2319 |
Part 3 of 3: Cameras follow microphotographer Lennart Nilsson as he obtains spectacular footage of events, including a human egg cell during conception and a journey through the aorta.
| 453 | 10 | "Cracking the Ice Age" | December 31, 1996 | 2320 |
| 454 | 11 | "Kaboom!" | January 14, 1997 | 2401 |
| 455 | 12 | "Titanic's Lost Sister" | January 28, 1997 | 2402 |
| 456 | 13 | "Secrets of Lost Empires: Stonehenge" (1 of 4) | February 11, 1997 | 2403 |
| 457 | 14 | "Secrets of Lost Empires: Inca" (2 of 4) | February 11, 1997 | 2404 |
| 458 | 15 | "Secrets of Lost Empires: Obelisk" (3 of 4) | February 12, 1997 | 2405 |
| 459 | 16 | "Secrets of Lost Empires: Colosseum" (4 of 4) | February 12, 1997 | 2406 |
| 460 | 17 | "Hunt for Alien Worlds" | February 18, 1997 | 2407 |
| 461 | 18 | "Curse of T. Rex" | February 25, 1997 | 2408 |
| 462 | 19 | "Cut to the Heart" | April 8, 1997 | 2409 |
| 463 | 20 | "Kingdom of the Seahorse" | April 15, 1997 | 2410 |

=== Season 25: 1997–98 ===
| No. overall | No. in season | Title | Original release date | Prod. code |
|---|---|---|---|---|
| 464 | 1 | "Coma" | October 7, 1997 | 2411 |
Please add a Plot Summary here and in the episodes below, replacing this text. For guidance, see How to write a plot summary. Episode summaries must be expressed in your own words. Do NOT submit content you find from another web site as it is plagiarism and likely a copyright violation, which Wikipedia cannot accept and will be removed or reverted. Superficially modifying copyrighted content or closely paraphrasing it, even if the source is cited, still constitutes a copyright violation. As per the Television Plot Manual of Style, summaries should be about 100 to 200 words in length, and those substantially less than 100 words are most likely to be scrutinized for possible copyright violation.
| 465 | 2 | "Faster Than Sound" | October 14, 1997 | 2412 |
Please add a Plot Summary here, as per WP:PLOTSUM & MOS:TVPLOT. Note: Heavily re-edited and re-narrated by Stacy Keach rather than Veronika Hyks, from the Secret History episode, "Breaking the Sound Barrier" (July 7, 1997).
| 466 | 3 | "Bomb Squad" | October 21, 1997 | 2413 |
Please add a Plot Summary here, as per WP:PLOTSUM & MOS:TVPLOT. Note: A Windfall Films production for WGBH in association with Channel 4 (UK). Original Channel 4 Equinox episode, "The Men with Nine Lives", November 24, 1996.
| 467 | 4 | "The Proof" | October 28, 1997 | 2414 |
Please add a Plot Summary here, as per WP:PLOTSUM & MOS:TVPLOT. Note: Re-narrated Horizon episode, "Fermat's Last Theorem".
| 468 | 5 | "Wild Wolves with David Attenborough" | November 11, 1997 | 2415 |
Please add a Plot Summary here, as per WP:PLOTSUM & MOS:TVPLOT. Note: Original BBC Wildlife Specials program, "Wolf: The Legendary Outlaw".
| 469 | 6 | "Super Bridge" | November 12, 1997 | 2416 |
| 470 | 7 | "Treasures of the Sunken City" | November 18, 1997 | 2417 |
| 471 | 8 | "Avalanche!" | November 25, 1997 | 2418 |
| 472 | 9 | "Danger in the Jet Stream" | December 2, 1997 | 2419 |
| 473 | 10 | "Night Creatures of the Kalahari" | January 6, 1998 | 2501 |
| 474 | 11 | "Mysterious Mummies of China" | January 20, 1998 | 2502 |
| 475 | 12 | "Supersonic Spies" | January 27, 1998 | 2503 |
| 476 | 13 | "Animal Hospital" | February 3, 1998 | 2504 |
| 477 | 14 | "The Brain Eater" | February 10, 1998 | 2505 |
| 478 | 15 | "Everest – The Death Zone" | February 24, 1998 | 2506 |
| 479 | 16 | "Search for the Lost Cave People" | March 31, 1998 | 2507 |
| 480 | 17 | "Warnings from the Ice" | April 21, 1998 | 2508 |
| 481 | 18 | "Crocodiles!" | April 28, 1998 | 2509 |
Please add a Plot Summary here, as per WP:PLOTSUM & MOS:TVPLOT. Note: BBC production in association with WGBH. Original BBC Wildlife Specials episode "Crocodile: The Smiling Predator".
| 482 | 19 | "The Truth About Impotence" | May 12, 1998 | 2510 |

=== Season 26: 1998–99 ===
| No. overall | No. in season | Title | Original release date | Prod. code |
|---|---|---|---|---|
| 483 | 1 | "Lost at Sea: The Search for Longitude" | October 6, 1998 | 2511 |
Tells of the dangers of longitudial errors in the age of exploration, the creation of the longitude prize, astronomical attempts at solution, and John Harrison's development of a chronometer-based solution.
| 484 | 2 | "Chasing El Niño" | October 13, 1998 | 2512 |
NOVA examines the effects of past and present El Niños on global weather and follows the work of scientists who are trying to understand and predict this phenomenon.
| 485 | 3 | "Terror In Space" | October 27, 1998 | 2513 |
NOVA looks at life on the Russian space station Mir and investigates the recent series of mishaps that the station has encountered.
| 486 | 4 | "Special Effects: Titanic and Beyond" | November 3, 1998 | 2514 |
NOVA reveals the secrets behind the on-screen images that have captured moviegoers' imaginations for years.
| 487 | 5 | "Deadly Shadow of Vesuvius" | November 10, 1998 | 2515 |
Archeologists study of the doom of the Roman city of Pompeii tells a story that hangs over the residents of Naples Italy even today.
| 488 | 6 | "Ice Mummies: Frozen in Heaven" (1 of 3) | November 24, 1998 | 2516 |
Part 1 of 3: NOVA accompanies anthropologist Johan Reinhard as he journeys to the 5,639-meter (18,500-foot) peak of Sara Sara in southern Peru in search of evidence of capa cocha, a ritual in which the Incas were said to sacrifice their own children to the gods.
| 489 | 7 | "Ice Mummies: Siberian Ice Maiden" (2 of 3) | November 24, 1998 | 2517 |
Part 2 of 3: NOVA follows archeologist Natalya Polosmok as she journeys to the Altay Mountains in southern Siberia to search for traces of an ancient people known as the Pazyryk.
| 490 | 8 | "Ice Mummies: Return of the Iceman" (3 of 3) | November 24, 1998 | 2518 |
Part 3 of 3: NOVA examines how science is unlocking the secrets of the Iceman, a man discovered in 1991 frozen in the Italian Alps.
| 491 | 9 | "Leopards of the Night" | December 1, 1998 | 2519 |
The social groups and predatory patterns of leopards living in the Luangua Valley of Zambia.
| 492 | 10 | "The Perfect Pearl" | December 29, 1998 | 2520 |
This NOVA program looks at the science of pearl farming, follows efforts of oyster farmers trying to cope with growing problems of pollution and overcrowding, and considers the shifting sands of dominance within the pearl industry.
| 493 | 11 | "The Beast of Loch Ness" | January 12, 1999 | 2601 |
Two American scientists search Loch Ness using the latest in sonar equipment to find the sea creature first reported more than 60 years ago.
| 494 | 12 | "Submarines, Secrets, and Spies" | January 19, 1999 | 2602 |
Oceanographer Robert Ballard pores over declassified Cold War documents to learn the fate of two sunken nuclear submarines.
| 495 | 13 | "Surviving AIDS" | February 2, 1999 | 2603 |
What scientists have learned about treating HIV and AIDS from studying people with a natural resistance to the conditions.
| 496 | 14 | "Escape! Because Accidents Happen: Fire" (1 of 4) | February 16, 1999 | 2604 |
Part 1 of 4: The tragedies that led to the mandatory installation of fire hydrants, sprinklers and evacuation drills.
| 497 | 15 | "Escape! Because Accidents Happen: Car Crash" (2 of 4) | February 16, 1999 | 2605 |
Part 2 of 4: The push for automotive safety that began 100 years ago and prompted such innovations as safety glass, roll bars and air bags.
| 498 | 16 | "Escape! Because Accidents Happen: Plane Crash" (3 of 4) | February 17, 1999 | 2606 |
Part 4 of 4: A brief history of airplane crashes shows the steps the industry has made toward improving commercial airline safety.
| 499 | 17 | "Escape! Because Accidents Happen: Abandon Ship" (4 of 4) | February 17, 1999 | 2607 |
Part 4 of 4: How the sinking of the Titanic in 1912 and the Estonia in 1994 have both contributed to international regulations at sea.
| 500 | 18 | "Battle Alert in the Gulf" | February 23, 1999 | 2608 |
See how US fighter pilots, strategists, ship captains, and crews contend with a hostile Iraq in the Persian Gulf.
| 501 | 19 | "Volcanoes of the Deep" | March 30, 1999 | 2609 |
Off Northwestern North-America's Pacific coast, two kilometers beneath the sea on top of a volcanic ridge, black smoker chimneys are spewing superheated water rich in poisonous chemicals. Here, far beyond the reach of sunlight, despite these poisons, or maybe because of them, bizarre life forms thrive. Watch as a daring exhibition explores these newly discovered wonders.
| 502 | 20 | "To the Moon" | July 13, 1999 | 2610 |
A two-hour special marking the 30th anniversary of the Apollo 11 mission.

=== Season 27: 1999–2000 ===
| No. overall | No. in season | Title | Original release date | Prod. code |
|---|---|---|---|---|
| 503 | 1 | "Fall of the Leaning Tower" | October 5, 1999 | 2611 |
The 10-year attempt to keep the Leaning Tower of Pisa, which began falling 800 years ago, from finally collapsing.
| 504 | 2 | "Everest: The Death Zone" | October 6, 1999 | 2612 |
In 1924 George Mallory and Andrew Irvine disappear while climbing Mount Everest.
| 505 | 3 | "Time Travel" | October 12, 1999 | 2613 |
A discussion of whether or not time travel is possible and the mechanisms that may allow it or prevent it.
| 506 | 4 | "The Killer's Trail" | October 19, 1999 | 2614 |
A re-examination of the forensic evidence largely ignored during the 1954 murder trial of Dr. Sam Sheppard, convicted of killing his wife.
| 507 | 5 | "Island of the Spirits" | November 2, 1999 | 2615 |
Life on the wintry Japanese island of Hokkaido, home to grizzly bears, cranes, flying squirrels, white-tailed eagles and Blakistons fish owls.
| 508 | 6 | "Decoding Nazi Secrets" | November 9, 1999 | 2616 |
How the British group of cryptologists known as Station X cracked the German code Enigma in 1940, helping to change the tide of World War II.
| 509 | 7 | "Voyage of Doom" | November 23, 1999 | 2617 |
The culmination of a 20-year search for a ship lost under the command of the French explorer La Salle in the 1680s.
| 510 | 8 | "Electric Heart" | December 21, 1999 | 2618 |
The work of two medical teams, one headed by Dr. Michael DeBakey and the other by Dr. Robert Jarvik, to invent a reliable mechanical replacement for a failing heart.
| 511 | 9 | "Tales from the Hive" | January 4, 2000 | 2701 |
A year inside a beehive shows an organized social life, rival queens, colony scouts and the defeat of enemies.
| 512 | 10 | "Lost on Everest" | January 18, 2000 | 2702 |
The discovery of George Leigh Mallory, a mountain climber whose body was found in 1999, 75 years after his attempt to climb Mount Everest.
| 513 | 11 | "Secrets of Lost Empires: Medieval Siege" (1 of 5) | February 1, 2000 | TBA |
Engineers design missile-launchers like those of the medieval era.
| 514 | 12 | "The Diamond Deception" | February 1, 2000 | 2703 |
Breakthroughs in the production of synthetic diamonds may transform the marketing of the expensive gem.
| 515 | 13 | "Secrets of Lost Empires: Pharaoh's Obelisk" (2 of 5) | February 8, 2000 | TBA |
Engineers try to re-create the raising of a massive granite obelisk, a feat that ancient Egyptians accomplished.
| 516 | 14 | "Trillion Dollar Bet" | February 8, 2000 | 2704 |
The billion-dollar investment strategies of two Nobel Prize winners that brought short-term profit but long-term debt.
| 517 | 15 | "Secrets of Lost Empires: Easter Island" (3 of 5) | February 15, 2000 | TBA |
Archaeologists, with the help of 70 Easter Island residents, try to transport a 15-ton statue replica across one mile of undeveloped terrain.
| 518 | 16 | "Mystery of the First Americans" | February 15, 2000 | 2705 |
How the discovery of a 10,000-year-old Caucasoid skull in Washington has stirred debate on the settlement of the New World.
| 519 | 17 | "Secrets of Lost Empires: Roman Bath" (4 of 5) | February 22, 2000 | TBA |
Engineers and architects build a Roman bath, complete with hot tubs, cold plunges and underfloor heating.
| 520 | 18 | "Lost Tribes of Israel" | February 22, 2000 | 2706 |
| 521 | 19 | "Secrets of Lost Empires: China Bridge" (5 of 5) | February 29, 2000 | TBA |
Two teams of engineers work from opposite sides of a river to link a re-created Chinese suspension bridge, using only historical information and a painting as a guide.
| 522 | 20 | "What's Up with the Weather?" | April 18, 2000 | TBA |
| 523 | 21 | "Stationed in the Stars" | April 25, 2000 | 2707 |
Russian and American efforts to build the International Space Station, a unit designed to house six astronauts 220 miles above the Earth.
| 524 | 22 | "The Vikings" | May 9, 2000 | 2708 |

=== Season 28: 2000–01 ===
| No. overall | No. in season | Title | Original release date | Prod. code |
|---|---|---|---|---|
| 525 | 1 | "Lincoln's Secret Weapon" | October 24, 2000 | 2710 |
Follow a naval archeology expedition as they study the wreckage of the USS Monitor, the Union's first ironclad ship during the American Civil War. The story is related with the background on the engineering, history, and sinking of the ship.
| 526 | 2 | "Holocaust on Trial" | October 31, 2000 | 2711 |
A case in London's High Court where scientific examination of evidence clearly documents the horrors of Auschwitz.
| 527 | 3 | "Hitler's Lost Sub" | November 14, 2000 | 2712 |
Documents a sunken German U-boat discovered off the coast of New Jersey in 1991 and the investigation of its origins.
| 528 | 4 | "Runaway Universe" | November 21, 2000 | 2713 |
| 529 | 5 | "Garden of Eden" | November 28, 2000 | 2714 |
| 530 | 6 | "Dying to Be Thin" | December 12, 2000 | 2715 |
| 531 | 7 | "Japan's Secret Garden" | December 18, 2000 | 2716 |
An examination how people can live in balance with nature, based on life around 2,000 years of human habitation around Japan's Lake Biwa.
| 532 | 8 | "Sultan's Lost Treasure" | January 16, 2001 | 2801 |
| 533 | 9 | "Vanished!" | January 30, 2001 | 2802 |
Tells the story of the search for the Avro Lancastrian airliner, Star Dust, that crashed in the Andes on its way to Santiago, Chile. BBC / WGBH co-production. Broadcast in 2000 as BBC Horizon episode, "Vanished: The Plane That Disappeared".
| 534 | 10 | "Nazi Prison Escape" | February 6, 2001 | 2803 |
Edited from the Windfall Films series for Channel 4 (UK) – Escape From Colditz.
| 535 | 11 | "Lost King of the Maya" | February 13, 2001 | 2804 |
This episode focuses on the search for the tomb of K'inich Yax K'uk' Mo', one of the first Ajaws of the Mayan city of Copán.
| 536 | 12 | "Cancer Warrior" | February 27, 2001 | 2805 |
Focuses on the cancer treatments developed by surgeon Judah Folkman.
| 537 | 13 | "Survivor M.D.: Tattooed Doctor" (1 of 3) | March 27, 2001 | 2806 |
| 538 | 14 | "Survivor M.D.: Second Opinions" (2 of 3) | April 3, 2001 | 2807 |
| 539 | 15 | "Survivor M.D.: Hearts & Minds" (3 of 3) | April 10, 2001 | 2808 |
| 540 | 16 | "Cracking the Code of Life" | April 17, 2001 | 2809 |
A two-hour special on the race to use the new techniques of molecular biology to decode a human genome for the first time, and what that code might reveal and make possible. Hosted by Robert Krulwich.
| 541 | 17 | "Harvest of Fear" | April 24, 2001 | TBA |
A coproduction with FRONTLINE.

=== Season 29: 2001–02 ===
| No. overall | No. in season | Title | Original release date | Prod. code |
|---|---|---|---|---|
| 542 | 1 | "Search for a Safe Cigarette" | October 2, 2001 | 2810 |
Chronicles efforts of the period to develop alternative to traditional cigarettes, including early electric cigarettes.
| 543 | 2 | "18 Ways to Make a Baby" | October 9, 2001 | 2811 |
| 544 | 3 | "Secrets of the Mind" | October 23, 2001 | 2812 |
| 545 | 4 | "Sex: Unknown" | October 30, 2001 | 2813 |
| 546 | 5 | "Russia's Nuclear Warriors" | November 6, 2001 | 2814 |
A journalist interviews members of Russia's nuclear armed forces and gives viewers a glimpse into their home and work lives, while discussing the challenges of nuclear policy and practice.
| 547 | 6 | "Bioterror" | November 13, 2001 | 2815 |
Released in the aftermath of the 2001 anthrax attacks, reports explore the history of germ warfare and its future. Note: Two versions exist; 90 minutes (2 December 2002), and 60 minutes (13 November 2001).
| 548 | 7 | "Life's Greatest Miracle" | November 20, 2001 | 2816 |
| 549 | 8 | "Methuselah Tree" | December 11, 2001 | 2817 |
Reveals the life and history of bristlecone pine trees in California's White Mountains -- some of the oldest living things on Earth.
| 550 | 9 | "Flying Casanovas" | December 25, 2001 | 2818 |
Courtship among Australia's Bowerbirds
| 551 | 10 | "Death Star" | January 8, 2002 | 2901 |
Discovery and history of the study of gamma ray bursts from dying stars.
| 552 | 11 | "Neanderthals on Trial" | January 22, 2002 | 2902 |
| 553 | 12 | "Fireworks!" | January 29, 2002 | 2903 |
| 554 | 13 | "Secrets, Lies, and Atomic Spies" | February 5, 2002 | 2904 |
| 555 | 14 | "The Missing Link" | February 26, 2002 | 2905 |
| 556 | 15 | "Shackleton's Voyage of Endurance" | March 26, 2002 | 2906 |
| 557 | 16 | "Why the Towers Fell" | April 30, 2002 | 2907 |
BBC / WGBH co-production. Broadcast as the Horizon episode, "The Fall of the World Trade Center".
| 558 | 17 | "Fire Wars" | May 7, 2002 | 2908 |

=== Season 30: 2002–03 ===
| No. overall | No. in season | Title | Original release date | Prod. code |
|---|---|---|---|---|
| 559 | 1 | "Killer Disease on Campus" | September 3, 2002 | 2909 |
A look at meningitis, its causes and consequences, and the complexities of the related public health practices for college students.
| 560 | 2 | "Mysterious Life of Caves" | October 1, 2002 | 2910 |
| 561 | 3 | "Lost Roman Treasure" | October 8, 2002 | 2911 |
| 562 | 4 | "Galileo's Battle for the Heavens" | October 29, 2002 | 2912 |
| 563 | 5 | "Volcano's Deadly Warning" | November 12, 2002 | 2913 |
| 564 | 6 | "Sinking City of Venice" | November 19, 2002 | 2914 |
| 565 | 7 | "Orchid Hunter" | November 26, 2002 | 2915 |
| 566 | 8 | "Spies That Fly" | January 7, 2003 | 3001 |
| 567 | 9 | "Last Flight of Bomber 31" | January 14, 2003 | 3002 |
| 568 | 10 | "Ancient Creature of the Deep" | January 21, 2003 | 3003 |
| 569 | 11 | "Battle of the X-Planes" | February 4, 2003 | 3004 |
| 570 | 12 | "Mountain of Ice" | February 11, 2003 | 3005 |
| 571 | 13 | "Lost Treasures of Tibet" | February 18, 2003 | 3006 |
| 572 | 14 | "Dirty Bomb" | February 25, 2003 | 3007 |
| 573 | 15 | "Deep Sea Invasion" | April 1, 2003 | 3008 |
| 574 | 16 | "Secret of Photo 51" | April 15, 2003 | 3009 |

=== Season 31: 2003–04 ===
| No. overall | No. in season | Title | Original release date | Prod. code |
|---|---|---|---|---|
| 575 | 1 | "Infinite Secrets" | September 30, 2003 | 3010 |
The story of Archimedes, the history of the Archimedes Palimpsest, and the use of modern imaging technology to assist in its transcription.
| 576 | 2 | "Who Killed the Red Baron?" | October 7, 2003 | 3011 |
Edited from the Channel 4 (UK) series Secret History 22 December 2002 episode "Dogfight – The Mystery of the Red Baron."
| 577 | 3 | "The Elegant Universe: Einstein's Dream" (1 of 3) | October 28, 2003 | 3012 |
Please add a Plot Summary here and in the episodes below, replacing this text. For guidance, see How to write a plot summary. Episode summaries must be expressed in your own words. Do NOT submit content you find from another web site as it is plagiarism and likely a copyright violation, which Wikipedia cannot accept and will be removed or reverted. Superficially modifying copyrighted content or closely paraphrasing it, even if the source is cited, still constitutes a copyright violation. As per the Television Plot Manual of Style, summaries should be about 100 to 200 words in length, and those substantially less than 100 words are most likely to be scrutinized for possible copyright violation.
| 578 | 4 | "The Elegant Universe: String's the Thing" (2 of 3) | October 28, 2003 | 3013 |
| 579 | 5 | "The Elegant Universe: Welcome to the 11th Dimension" (3 of 3) | November 4, 2003 | 3014 |
| 580 | 6 | "Wright Brothers' Flying Machine" | November 11, 2003 | 3015 |
| 581 | 7 | "Magnetic Storm" | November 18, 2003 | 3016 |
| 582 | 8 | "Volcano Above the Clouds" | November 25, 2003 | 3017 |
| 583 | 9 | "Mars Dead or Alive" | January 4, 2004 | 3101 |
| 584 | 10 | "Secrets of the Crocodile Caves" | January 20, 2004 | 3102 |
| 585 | 11 | "Dogs and More Dogs" | February 3, 2004 | 3103 |
| 586 | 12 | "Descent into the Ice" | February 10, 2004 | 3104 |
| 587 | 13 | "Crash of Flight 111" | February 17, 2004 | 3105 |
| 588 | 14 | "Life and Death in the War Zone" | March 4, 2004 | 3106 |
| 589 | 15 | "Hunt for the Supertwister" | March 30, 2004 | 3107 |
| 590 | 16 | "World in the Balance: The People Paradox" | April 20, 2004 | 3108 |
| 590 | 16 | "World in the Balance: China Revs Up" | April 20, 2004 | 3108 |
| 591 | 17 | "Battle Plan Under Fire" | May 4, 2004 | 3110 |

=== Season 32: 2004–05 ===
| No. overall | No. in season | Title | Original release date | Prod. code |
|---|---|---|---|---|
| 592 | 1 | "Origins: Earth is Born" (1 of 4) | September 28, 2004 | 3111 |
Please add a Plot Summary here and in the episodes below, replacing this text. For guidance, see How to write a plot summary. Episode summaries must be expressed in your own words. Do NOT submit content you find from another web site as it is plagiarism and likely a copyright violation, which Wikipedia cannot accept and will be removed or reverted. Superficially modifying copyrighted content or closely paraphrasing it, even if the source is cited, still constitutes a copyright violation. As per the Television Plot Manual of Style, summaries should be about 100 to 200 words in length, and those substantially less than 100 words are most likely to be scrutinized for possible copyright violation. Note: Edited from the Channel 4 (UK) series The Day the Earth was Born episode "Creation".
| 593 | 2 | "Origins: How Life Began" (2 of 4) | September 28, 2004 | 3112 |
Edited from the Channel 4 (UK) series The Day the Earth was Born episode "Life".
| 594 | 3 | "Origins: Where Are the Aliens?" (3 of 4) | September 29, 2004 | 3113 |
| 595 | 4 | "Origins: Back to the Beginning" (4 of 4) | September 29, 2004 | 3114 |
| 596 | 5 | "The Most Dangerous Woman in America: Typhoid Mary" | October 12, 2004 | 3115 |
A PBS Nova Episode about Mary Mallon, who was known more commonly as Typhoid Mary
| 597 | 6 | "America's Stone Age Explorers" | November 9, 2004 | 3116 |
Original BBC Horizon episode, "Stone Age Columbus", first broadcast in 2002.
| 598 | 7 | "Great Escape" | November 16, 2004 | 3117 |
Windfall Films production for Five (UK) / WGBH / The History Channel (UK) originally broadcast on Five in March 2004 as The Great Escape: Revealed.
| 599 | 8 | "Ancient Refuge in the Holy Land" | November 23, 2004 | 3118 |
| 600 | 9 | "Welcome to Mars" | January 4, 2005 | 3201 |
Spirit and Opportunity Mars rovers.
| 601 | 10 | "The Boldest Hoax" | January 11, 2005 | 3202 |
One of the most famous hoaxes in archaeological history, the Piltdown Man. Original BBC Timewatch episode "Britain's Greatest Hoax".
| 602 | 11 | "Supersonic Dream" | January 18, 2005 | 3203 |
Original BBC Timewatch episode "Concorde: A Love Story".
| 603 | 12 | "The Viking Deception" | February 8, 2005 | 3205 |
Original Channel 4 (UK) documentary Vinland: Viking Map or Million-Dollar Hoax?.
| 604 | 13 | "Saving the National Treasures" | February 15, 2005 | 3206 |
| 605 | 14 | "A Daring Flight" | February 22, 2005 | 3207 |
| 606 | 15 | "Wave That Shook the World" | March 29, 2005 | 3208 |
Original Channel 4 (UK) Equinox episode, "The Wave That Shook The World".

=== Season 33: 2005–06 ===
| No. overall | No. in season | Title | Original release date | Prod. code |
|---|---|---|---|---|
| 607 | 1 | "Mystery of the Megaflood" | September 20, 2005 | 3211 |
Please add a Plot Summary here and in the episodes below, replacing this text. For guidance, see How to write a plot summary. Episode summaries must be expressed in your own words. Do NOT submit content you find from another web site as it is plagiarism and likely a copyright violation, which Wikipedia cannot accept and will be removed or reverted. Superficially modifying copyrighted content or closely paraphrasing it, even if the source is cited, still constitutes a copyright violation. As per the Television Plot Manual of Style, summaries should be about 100 to 200 words in length, and those substantially less than 100 words are most likely to be scrutinized for possible copyright violation.
| 608 | 2 | "Sinking the Supership" | October 4, 2005 | 3212 |
| 609 | 3 | "Einstein's Big Idea (E=mc²: Einstein's Big Idea)" | October 11, 2005 | 3213 |
| 610 | 4 | "Volcano Under the City" | November 1, 2005 | 3215 |
| 611 | 5 | "Hitler's Sunken Secret" | November 8, 2005 | 3216 |
| 612 | 6 | "Newton's Dark Secrets" | November 15, 2005 | 3217 |
Original BBC documentary, Newton: The Dark Heretic, first broadcast in 2003.
| 613 | 7 | "Storm That Drowned A City" | November 22, 2005 | 3218 |
| 614 | 8 | "The Mummy Who Would Be King" | January 3, 2006 | 3301 |
| 615 | 9 | "Deadly Ascent" | January 17, 2006 | 3303 |
| 616 | 10 | "The Perfect Corpse" | February 7, 2006 | 3304 |
| 617 | 11 | "Jewel of the Earth" | February 14, 2006 | 3305 |
Re-edited from the BBC Natural World program, "The Amber Time Machine".
| 618 | 12 | "The Ghost Particle" | February 21, 2006 | 3306 |
Original BBC Horizon episode, "Project Poltergeist".
| 619 | 13 | "Arctic Passage" | February 28, 2006 | 3307 |
Re-narrated Channel 4 (UK) documentary, The Search for the Northwest Passage
| 620 | 14 | "The Great Robot Race" | March 28, 2006 | 3308 |
| 621 | 15 | "Voyage to the Mystery Moon" | April 4, 2006 | 3309 |
Edited from the BBC Horizon episodes, "Saturn: Lord of the Rings" and "Titan: A Place Like Home".
| 622 | 16 | "Dimming the Sun" | April 18, 2006 | 3310 |
Re-edited Horizon episode, "Global Dimming".

=== Season 34: 2006–07 ===
| No. overall | No. in season | Title | Original release date | Prod. code |
|---|---|---|---|---|
| 623 | 1 | "Building on Ground Zero" | September 5, 2006 | 3311 |
Please add a Plot Summary here and in the episodes below, replacing this text. For guidance, see How to write a plot summary. Episode summaries must be expressed in your own words. Do NOT submit content you find from another web site as it is plagiarism and likely a copyright violation, which Wikipedia cannot accept and will be removed or reverted. Superficially modifying copyrighted content or closely paraphrasing it, even if the source is cited, still constitutes a copyright violation. As per the Television Plot Manual of Style, summaries should be about 100 to 200 words in length, and those substantially less than 100 words are most likely to be scrutinized for possible copyright violation. Note: A BBC / WGBH co-production.
| 624 | 2 | "Mystery of the Megavolcano" | September 26, 2006 | 3312 |
| 625 | 3 | "The Deadliest Plane Crash" | October 17, 2006 | 3314 |
An investigation into the Tenerife airport disaster.
| 626 | 4 | "Monster of the Milky Way" | October 31, 2006 | 3315 |
| 627 | 5 | "Wings of Madness" | November 7, 2006 | 3316 |
| 628 | 6 | "The Family That Walks On All Fours" | November 14, 2006 | 3317 |
| 629 | 7 | "Underwater Dream Machine" | December 26, 2006 | 3319 |
| 630 | 8 | "Forgotten Genius" | February 6, 2007 | 3402 |
| 631 | 9 | "The Last Great Ape" | February 13, 2007 | 3403 |
Re-edited from the BBC Natural World program "Bonobo: Missing in Action".
| 632 | 10 | "Kings of Camouflage" | April 3, 2007 | 3404 |
Cuttlefish are among the strangest animals on Earth. They have the largest brain to body ratio of any invertebrate.
| 633 | 11 | "First Flower" | April 17, 2007 | 3405 |
| 634 | 12 | "Saved by the Sun" | April 24, 2007 | 3406 |
| 635 | 13 | "Pocahontas Revealed" | May 8, 2007 | 3407 |
| 636 | 14 | "Bone Diggers" | June 19, 2007 | 3408 |
| 637 | 15 | "The Great Inca Rebellion" | June 26, 2007 | 3409 |

=== Season 35: 2007–08 ===
| No. overall | No. in season | Title | Original release date | Prod. code |
|---|---|---|---|---|
| 638 | 1 | "Secrets of the Samurai Sword" | October 9, 2007 | 3412 |
Please add a Plot Summary here and in the episodes below, replacing this text. For guidance, see How to write a plot summary. Episode summaries must be expressed in your own words. Do NOT submit content you find from another web site as it is plagiarism and likely a copyright violation, which Wikipedia cannot accept and will be removed or reverted. Superficially modifying copyrighted content or closely paraphrasing it, even if the source is cited, still constitutes a copyright violation. As per the Television Plot Manual of Style, summaries should be about 100 to 200 words in length, and those substantially less than 100 words are most likely to be scrutinized for possible copyright violation.
| 639 | 2 | "Ghost in Your Genes" | October 16, 2007 | 3413 |
Original BBC Horizon episode broadcast in 2005.
| 640 | 3 | "Marathon Challenge" | October 30, 2007 | 3414 |
| 641 | 4 | "Sputnik Declassified" | November 6, 2007 | 3415 |
| 642 | 5 | "Judgment Day: Intelligent Design on Trial" | November 13, 2007 | 3416 |
| 643 | 6 | "Master of the Killer Ants" | November 20, 2007 | 3417 |
This re-narrated version of the French documentary Jaglavak, Prince of Insects looks at the relationship the Mofu people of northern Cameroon have with insects, such as using red driver ants to combat termites.
| 644 | 7 | "Missing in MiG Alley" | December 18, 2007 | 3418 |
| 645 | 8 | "Absolute Zero: The Conquest of Cold" (1 of 2) | January 8, 2008 | 3504 |
A Windfall Films production for BBC Four broadcast in December 2007.
| 646 | 9 | "Absolute Zero: The Race for Absolute Zero" (2 of 2) | January 15, 2008 | 3505 |
A Windfall Films production for BBC Four broadcast in December 2007.
| 647 | 10 | "Secrets of the Parthenon" | January 29, 2008 | 3503 |
| 648 | 11 | "Astrospies" | February 12, 2008 | 3501 |
| 649 | 12 | "Ape Genius" | February 19, 2008 | 3507 |
| 650 | 13 | "The Four-Winged Dinosaur" | February 26, 2008 | 3502 |
| 651 | 14 | "Cracking the Maya Code" | April 8, 2008 | 3508 |
| 652 | 15 | "Car of the Future" | April 22, 2008 | 3509 |
| 653 | 16 | "A Walk to Beautiful" | May 13, 2008 | 3506 |
| 654 | 17 | "Lord of the Ants" | May 20, 2008 | 3510 |

=== Season 36: 2008–09 ===
| No. overall | No. in season | Title | Original release date | Prod. code |
|---|---|---|---|---|
| 655 | 1 | "Arctic Dinosaurs" | October 7, 2008 | 3511 |
Please add a Plot Summary here and in the episodes below, replacing this text. For guidance, see How to write a plot summary. Episode summaries must be expressed in your own words. Do NOT submit content you find from another web site as it is plagiarism and likely a copyright violation, which Wikipedia cannot accept and will be removed or reverted. Superficially modifying copyrighted content or closely paraphrasing it, even if the source is cited, still constitutes a copyright violation. As per the Television Plot Manual of Style, summaries should be about 100 to 200 words in length, and those substantially less than 100 words are most likely to be scrutinized for possible copyright violation.
| 656 | 2 | "Space Shuttle Disaster" | October 14, 2008 | 3512 |
| 657 | 3 | "Parallel Worlds, Parallel Lives" | October 21, 2008 | 3513 |
| 658 | 4 | "Hunting the Hidden Dimension" | October 28, 2008 | 3514 |
You may not know it, but fractals, like the air you breathe, are all around you. Their irregular, repeating shapes are found in cloud formations and tree limbs, in stalks of broccoli and craggy mountain ranges, even in the rhythm of the human heart. In this film, NOVA takes viewers on a fascinating quest with a group of maverick mathematicians determined to decipher the rules that govern fractal geometry. For centuries, fractal-like irregular shapes were considered beyond the boundaries of mathematical understanding. Now, mathematicians have finally begun mapping this uncharted territory. Their remarkable findings are deepening our understanding of nature and stimulating a new wave of scientific, medical, and artistic innovation stretching from the ecology of the rainforest to fashion design. The documentary highlights a host of filmmakers, fashion designers, physicians, and researchers who are using fractal geometry to innovate and inspire.
| 659 | 5 | "Alien from Earth" | November 11, 2008 | 3515 |
| 660 | 6 | "The Bible's Buried Secrets" | November 18, 2008 | 3516 |
| 661 | 7 | "Ocean Animal Emergency" | November 25, 2008 | 3517 |
| 662 | 8 | "Is There Life on Mars?" | December 30, 2008 | 3518 |
| 663 | 9 | "The Big Energy Gamble" | January 20, 2009 | 3519 |
| 664 | 10 | "The Incredible Journey of the Butterflies" | January 27, 2009 | 3601 |
| 665 | 11 | "The Spy Factory" | February 3, 2009 | 3602 |
| 666 | 12 | "Rat Attack" | February 24, 2009 | 3603 |
| 667 | 13 | "Extreme Ice" | March 24, 2009 | 3604 |
| 668 | 14 | "Last Extinction" "Megabeasts' Sudden Death" | March 31, 2009 | 3607 |
| 669 | 15 | "Doctors' Diaries, Part One" | April 7, 2009 | 3608 |
| 670 | 16 | "Doctors' Diaries, Part Two" | April 14, 2009 | 3609 |
| 671 | 17 | "Musical Minds" | June 30, 2009 | 3610 |

=== Season 37: 2009–10 ===
| No. overall | No. in season | Title | Original release date | Prod. code |
|---|---|---|---|---|
| 672 | 1 | "Darwin's Darkest Hour" | October 6, 2009 | 3605. 3606 |
Please add a Plot Summary here and in the episodes below, replacing this text. For guidance, see How to write a plot summary. Episode summaries must be expressed in your own words. Do NOT submit content you find from another web site as it is plagiarism and likely a copyright violation, which Wikipedia cannot accept and will be removed or reverted. Superficially modifying copyrighted content or closely paraphrasing it, even if the source is cited, still constitutes a copyright violation. As per the Television Plot Manual of Style, summaries should be about 100 to 200 words in length, and those substantially less than 100 words are most likely to be scrutinized for possible copyright violation.
| 673 | 2 | "Hubble's Amazing Rescue" | October 13, 2009 | 3611 |
| 674 | 3 | "Lizard Kings" | October 20, 2009 | 3616 |
| 675 | 4 | "Becoming Human: Unearthing Our Earliest Ancestors: First Steps" (1 of 3) | November 3, 2009 | 3613 |
| 676 | 5 | "Becoming Human: Unearthing Our Earliest Ancestors: Birth of Humanity" (2 of 3) | November 10, 2009 | 3614 |
| 677 | 6 | "Becoming Human: Unearthing Our Earliest Ancestors: Last Human Standing" (3 of 3) | November 17, 2009 | 3615 |
| 678 | 7 | "What Are Dreams?" | November 24, 2009 | 3612 |
Note: Co-produced by the BBC.
| 679 | 8 | "What Darwin Never Knew" | December 29, 2009 | 3617 |
| 680 | 9 | "Killer Subs in Pearl Harbor" | January 5, 2010 | 3701 |
| 681 | 10 | "Building Pharaoh's Ship" | January 12, 2010 | 3702 |
| 682 | 11 | "Riddles of the Sphinx" | January 19, 2010 | 3703 |
| 683 | 12 | "Ghosts of Machu Picchu" | February 2, 2010 | 3704 |
| 684 | 13 | "Extreme Cave Diving" | February 9, 2010 | 3705 |
| 685 | 14 | "The Pluto Files" | March 2, 2010 | 3706 |
| 686 | 15 | "Hunting the Edge of Space: The Mystery of the Milky Way" (1 of 2) | April 6, 2010 | 3708 |
| 687 | 16 | "Hunting the Edge of Space: The Ever Expanding Universe" (2 of 2) | April 13, 2010 | 3709 |
| 688 | 17 | "Mind Over Money: How Human Psychology and Finance Interact" | April 27, 2010 | 3707 |
| 689 | 18 | "Mt. St. Helens: Back From The Dead" | May 4, 2010 | 3710 |

=== Season 38: 2010–11 ===
| No. overall | No. in season | Title | Original release date | Prod. code |
|---|---|---|---|---|
| 690 | 1 | "Building the Great Cathedrals" | October 19, 2010 | 3711 |
Please add a Plot Summary here and in the episodes below, replacing this text. For guidance, see How to write a plot summary. Episode summaries must be expressed in your own words. Do NOT submit content you find from another web site as it is plagiarism and likely a copyright violation, which Wikipedia cannot accept and will be removed or reverted. Superficially modifying copyrighted content or closely paraphrasing it, even if the source is cited, still constitutes a copyright violation. As per the Television Plot Manual of Style, summaries should be about 100 to 200 words in length, and those substantially less than 100 words are most likely to be scrutinized for possible copyright violation.
| 691 | 2 | "Emergency Mine Rescue" | October 26, 2010 | 3712 |
Note: Co-produced with Channel Four UK.
| 692 | 3 | "Trapped in an Elevator" | November 2, 2010 | 3713 |
| 693 | 4 | "Dogs Decoded" | November 9, 2010 | 3714 |
| 694 | 5 | "Secrets of Stonehenge" | November 16, 2010 | 3715 |
| 695 | 6 | "Quest for Solomon's Mines" | November 23, 2010 | 3716 |
| 696 | 7 | "Secrets Beneath the Ice" | December 28, 2010 | 3717 |
| 697 | 8 | "Deadliest Earthquakes" | January 11, 2011 | 3801 |
The 2010 Haiti earthquake and 2010 Chile earthquake.
| 698 | 9 | "Making Stuff: Stronger" (1 of 4) | January 19, 2011 | 3802 |
Hosted by David Pogue.
| 699 | 10 | "Making Stuff: Smaller" (2 of 4) | January 26, 2011 | 3803 |
| 700 | 11 | "Making Stuff: Cleaner" (3 of 4) | February 2, 2011 | 3804 |
| 701 | 12 | "Making Stuff: Smarter" (4 of 4) | February 9, 2011 | 3805 |
| 702 | 13 | "Smartest Machine on Earth" | February 9, 2011 | 3806 |
Can IBM's Watson computer win on Jeopardy!?
| 703 | 14 | "Crash of Flight 447" | February 16, 2011 | 3807 |
| 704 | 15 | "Venom: Nature's Killer" | February 23, 2011 | 3808 |
| 705 | 16 | "Japan's Killer Quake" | March 30, 2011 | 3810 |
| 706 | 17 | "Power Surge" | April 20, 2011 | 3809 |

=== Season 39: 2011–12 ===
| No. overall | No. in season | Title | Original release date | Prod. code |
|---|---|---|---|---|
| 707 | 1 | "Engineering Ground Zero" | September 7, 2011 | 3811 |
Please add a Plot Summary here and in the episodes below, replacing this text. For guidance, see How to write a plot summary. Episode summaries must be expressed in your own words. Do NOT submit content you find from another web site as it is plagiarism and likely a copyright violation, which Wikipedia cannot accept and will be removed or reverted. Superficially modifying copyrighted content or closely paraphrasing it, even if the source is cited, still constitutes a copyright violation. As per the Television Plot Manual of Style, summaries should be about 100 to 200 words in length, and those substantially less than 100 words are most likely to be scrutinized for possible copyright violation.
| 708 | 2 | "Surviving The Tsunami" | September 28, 2011 | 3812 |
Note: Produced by NHK.
| 709 | 3 | "Finding Life Beyond Earth: Are We Alone?" | October 19, 2011 | 3813, 3814 |
| 709 | 3 | "Finding Life Beyond Earth: Moons and Beyond" | October 19, 2011 | 3813, 3814 |
| 710 | 4 | "Iceman Murder Mystery" | October 26, 2011 | 3815 |
The story of Ötzi the Iceman.
| 711 | 5 | "The Fabric of the Cosmos: What is Space?" (1 of 4) | November 2, 2011 | 3816 |
| 712 | 6 | "The Fabric of the Cosmos: The Illusion of Time" (2 of 4) | November 9, 2011 | 3817 |
| 713 | 7 | "The Fabric of the Cosmos: Quantum Leap" (3 of 4) | November 16, 2011 | 3818 |
| 714 | 8 | "The Fabric of the Cosmos: Universe or Multiverse?" (4 of 4) | November 23, 2011 | 3819 |
| 715 | 9 | "Deadliest Volcanoes" | January 4, 2012 | 3901 |
| 716 | 10 | "Bombing Hitler's Dams" | January 11, 2012 | 3902 |
A recreation of Operation Chastise and the bouncing bomb, using a Buffalo Airways DC-4 airplane (C-FIQM). Counterpart to the UK documentary Dambusters: Building the Bouncing Bomb, Canadian documentary Dambusters Fly Again, and Ice Pilots NWT season 3 episode 2 of the "Dambusters" show.
| 717 | 11 | "3D Spies of WWII" | January 18, 2012 | 3903 |
Discusses the Allied aerial reconnaissance program, and how the usage of 3D imagery revealed much more information than ordinary photographs would have, mostly in relation to the V-weapons.
| 718 | 12 | "Mystery of a Masterpiece" | January 25, 2012 | 3904 |
| 719 | 13 | "Ice Age Death Trap" | February 1, 2012 | 3905 |
| 720 | 14 | "Separating Twins" | February 8, 2012 | 3908 |
| 721 | 15 | "Cracking Your Genetic Code" | March 28, 2012 | 3909 |
| 722 | 16 | "Hunting the Elements" | April 4, 2012 | 3906 |
| 723 | 17 | "Deadliest Tornadoes" | April 11, 2012 | 3910 |
| 724 | 18 | "Why Ships Sink" | April 18, 2012 | 3911 |
| 725 | 19 | "Secrets of the Sun" | April 25, 2012 | 3907 |

=== Season 40: 2012–13 ===
| No. overall | No. in season | Title | Original release date | Prod. code |
|---|---|---|---|---|
| 726 | 1 | "Secrets of the Viking Sword" | October 10, 2012 | 3913 |
Please add a Plot Summary here and in the episodes below, replacing this text. For guidance, see How to write a plot summary. Episode summaries must be expressed in your own words. Do NOT submit content you find from another web site as it is plagiarism and likely a copyright violation, which Wikipedia cannot accept and will be removed or reverted. Superficially modifying copyrighted content or closely paraphrasing it, even if the source is cited, still constitutes a copyright violation. As per the Television Plot Manual of Style, summaries should be about 100 to 200 words in length, and those substantially less than 100 words are most likely to be scrutinized for possible copyright violation.
| 727 | 2 | "Forensics on Trial" | October 17, 2012 | 3912 |
| 728 | 3 | "Mystery of Easter Island" | November 7, 2012 | 3914 |
| 729 | 4 | "Ultimate Mars Challenge" | November 14, 2012 | 3915 |
| 730 | 5 | "Inside the Megastorm" | November 18, 2012 | 3916 |
| 731 | 6 | "Doomsday Volcanoes" | January 2, 2013 | 4001 |
| 732 | 7 | "Decoding Neanderthals" | January 9, 2013 | 4002 |
| 733 | 8 | "Rise of the Drones" | January 23, 2013 | 4003 |
| 734 | 9 | "Who Killed Lindbergh's Baby?" | January 30, 2013 | 4004 |
| 735 | 10 | "Building Pharaoh's Chariot" | February 6, 2013 | 4005 |
| 736 | 11 | "Earth From Space" | February 13, 2013 | 4006 |
| 737 | 12 | "Mind of a Rampage Killer" | February 20, 2013 | 4008 |
| 738 | 13 | "Meteor Strike" | March 27, 2013 | 4013 |
| 739 | 14 | "Ancient Computer" | April 3, 2013 | 4007 |
| 740 | 15 | "Australia's First 4 Billion Years: Awakening" | April 10, 2013 | 4009 |
| 741 | 16 | "Australia's First 4 Billion Years: Life Explodes" | April 17, 2013 | 4010 |
| 742 | 17 | "Australia's First 4 Billion Years: Monsters" | April 24, 2013 | 4011 |
| 743 | 18 | "Australia's First 4 Billion Years: Strange Creatures" | May 1, 2013 | 4012 |
| 744 | 19 | "Manhunt—Boston Bombers" | May 29, 2013 | 4014 |
| 745 | 20 | "Oklahoma's Deadliest Tornadoes" | May 29, 2013 | 4015 |

== Sources ==
- "Nova – Past Television Programs". PBS. Retrieved on 20 December 2009
