= List of Natural World episodes =

The following is a list of episodes of the BBC television series Natural World.

Contents

Series: 1 · 2 · 3 · 4 · 5 · 6 · 7 · 8 · 9 · 10 · 11 · 12 · 13 · 14 · 15 · 16 · 17 · 18 · 19 · 20
21 · 22 · 23 · 24 · 25 · 26 · 27 · 28 · 29 · 30 · 31 · 32 · 33 · 34 · 35 · 36 · 37 · 38

Footnotes · References · External links

== Series 1 ==
Episode	Title	Original air date	Presenter/narrator	Subject matter or featured species
1	Save the Panda	30 October 1983	Barry Paine	Giant panda
2	From Aardvark to Zebra	6 November 1983	Jonathan Kingdon	Kilimanjaro
3	Programmed for Flight	13 November 1983	Barry Paine	Bird migration
4	Jungle	20 November 1983	David Hughes	Costa Rican rainforest
5	Secret Weapons	27 November 1983	Tom Elsner	Insect chemical defences
6	Birds of Paradox	4 December 1983		Flightless birds
7	Jet Set Wildlife	11 December 1983	Barry Paine	Introduced species
8	Pelican Delta	18 December 1983	Barry Paine	Pelicans in the Danube
9	Winter Days	25 December 1983	Robert Powell	British wildlife in Winter
10	God's Acre	2 January 1984	Barry Paine	Wildlife in a British churchyard

== Series 2 ==
Episode	Title	Original air date	Presenter/narrator	Subject matter or featured species
1	Plight of the Bumble-Bee	6 May 1984	Barry Paine	Bumblebees
2	Salim Ali's India	13 May 1984	Barry Paine	Salim Ali and the wildlife of India
3	The Kiwai - Dugong Hunters of Daru	20 May 1984	David Attenborough	Dugong
4	Commandos of Conservation	3 June 1984	Trevor Philpott	Greenpeace
5	Long Point	10 June 1984	Barry Paine	Wildlife of Long Point, Lake Erie
6	Beneath the Keel	17 June 1984	Barry Paine, Jeff Goodman, Laurie Emberson	Marine life of Devon
7	Treasures of the Gulf	1 July 1984		Wildlife of the Persian Gulf
8	Fragments of Eden	22 July 1984	Barry Paine	Wildlife of the Seychelles

== Series 3 ==
Episode	Title	Original air date	Presenter/narrator	Subject matter or featured species
1	Among the Wild Chimpanzees	4 November 1984	Barry Paine, Jane Goodall	Eastern chimpanzee
2	One Man's Island	11 November 1984	Anthony Quayle, Keith Brockie	Isle of May
3	Invaders of the Truk Lagoon	18 November 1984	Barry Paine	Wildlife of Truk Lagoon
4	The Desire of the Moth	25 November 1984	Barry Paine	Moths
5	A Question of Space	2 December 1984	Iain Guest	Satellites monitoring land use for conservation in Kenya
6	Peacocks, Parasites and the Puzzle of Sex	9 December 1984		Evolution of sexual reproduction
7	Land of Ice and Fire	16 December 1984	Anthony Valentine	Wildlife of Yellowstone
8	The Lost World of Medusa	23 December 1984	Barry Paine	Wildlife in Jellyfish Lake, Palau
9	Kinabalu, Summit of Borneo	6 January 1985	Barry Paine	Wildlife of Mount Kinabalu
10	Wild Ireland	13 January 1985	Barry Paine	Wildife of Ireland
11	Water - A Fresh Look	20 January 1985	Barry Paine, Walter Sigl	Fresh water wildlife
12	Battle of the Leaves	27 January 1985		Leaves
13	The Year of the Rat	3 February 1985	Barry Paine	Brown rat
14	Through Animal Eyes	10 February 1985	Andrew Sachs	Animal eyesight
15	Within a Garden Wall	17 February 1985	Peter France	Wildife in a Cotswold dry stone wall

== Series 4 ==
Episode	Title	Original air date	Presenter/narrator	Subject matter or featured species
1	Land of the Tiger	15 September 1985		Bengal tiger
2	Namaqualand, Diary of a Desert Garden	22 September 1985	Barry Paine	Botany in Namaqualand
3	Horns of Dilemma	29 September 1985	John Hedges	Trade in rhino horn
4	On the Verge of Life	6 October 1985	Martin Jarvis	Wildlife on British motorway verges
5	The Man Who Loves Frogs	13 October 1985	Barry Paine	Frogs
6	Emas, The High Plains of Brazil	20 October 1985	Barry Paine	Wildife of Emas National Park, Brazil
7	The Flight of the Whooping Crane	27 October 1985	Barry Paine	Whooping crane
8	White Rock, Black Water	3 November 1985	Richard Mabey	Wildlife of the Yorkshire Dales
9	Never Stay in One Place	10 November 1985	Robyn Williams	Wildlife of Kakadu, Australia
10	City of Coral	17 November 1985	Barry Paine	Coral in the Caribbean
11	Kingdom of the Ice Bear: The Frozen Ocean (Note: Cameraman Hugh Miles won an Emmy Award (Outstanding Individual Achievement in a Craft: Cinematographers) for this episode.)	24 November 1985	Hywel Bennett	Polar bear and wildlife of the Arctic
12	Kingdom of the Ice Bear: The Land of Beyond	1 December 1985	Hywel Bennett	Polar bear and wildlife of the Arctic
13	Kingdom of the Ice Bear: The Final Challenge	8 December 1985	Hywel Bennett	Polar bear and wildlife of the Arctic
14	Aspen, A Dance of Leaves	22 December 1985	Siân Phillips	Aspen in Canada
15	The Plant Hunters	29 December 1985	Barry Paine	Hunting for new plant species
16	Shortgrass Country	5 January 1986	Barry Paine	Wildlife of the Canadian prairie
17	The Forgotten Garden	12 January 1986	Barry Paine	Wildlife in an abandoned English garden
18	Inside Stories	19 January 1986	Barry Paine	Animal physiology
19	Masked Monkeys	26 January 1986	Jonathan Kingdon	Guenons
20	Sky Hunters	2 February 1986	Libby Purves	Vultures

== Series 5 ==
Episode	Title	Original air date	Presenter/narrator	Subject matter or featured species
1	Leopard, a Darkness in the Grass	5 October 1986	Hugh Miles	Leopard
2	Where the Parrots Speak Mandarin	12 October 1986		Chinese relationship with animals
3	The Mystery of Laguna Baja	19 October 1986	Barry Paine	Wildlife of a lagoon in Baja California
4	Have Fish Had Their Chips?	16 November 1986	Julian Pettifer	Overfishing
5	Why Dogs Don't Like Chilli But Some Like It Hot	23 November 1986	Jeremy Churfas	Animal diets
6	The Elephant Challenge	30 November 1986	Iain Guest	African elephant
7	Ichkeul, Between the Desert and the Deep Blue Sea	7 December 1986	Barry Paine	Wildlife of Lake Ichkeul, Tunisia
8	Man-Eaters of Kumaon	14 December 1986	Dramatisation	Man-eating big cats in India
9	A Cactus Called Saguaro	21 December 1986	Barry Paine	Saguaro cactus
10	A Wilderness Like Eden	11 January 1987	Peter France	Wildlife of the Holy Land
11	Sweet Water, Bitter Sea	18 January 1987	Peter France	Wildlife of the Holy Land
12	Bats Need Friends	25 January 1987	Andrew Sachs	Bats
13	Cockatoos at Three Springs	1 February 1987	Robyn Williams	Cockatoos
14	The Volcano Watchers	8 February 1987	Barry Paine	Volcanoes
15	The Deciding Factor	15 February 1987	Barry Paine	Animal decision making
16	Reflections of a River Keeper	22 February 1987	Barry Paine, Tom Williams	Wildlife of River Avon, Hampshire
17	Towers of Wax and Paper Palaces	1 March 1987	Barry Paine	Animal builders

== Series 6 ==
Episode	Title	Original air date	Presenter/narrator	Subject matter or featured species
1	Spirits of the Forest	20 September 1987	Andrew Sachs	Wildife of Madagascar
2	Land of the Kiwi	27 September 1987	Barry Paine	Wildlife of New Zealand
3	Lions of the African Night	4 October 1987	Martin Jarvis	Lion
4	Forest of Fear	11 October 1987	Barry Paine	Wildife of the Sundarbans
5	Icebird	18 October 1987	Tony Soper	Penguins
6	Ticket to the Wild	25 October 1987	Barry Paine	Wildlife of British railway verges
7	Grizzly!	1 November 1987	Barry Paine	Grizzly bear
8	Islands of the Fire Goddess	15 November 1987	Jack Watson	Wildife of the Hawaiian Islands
9	Paradise Reclaimed	22 November 1987	Tom Conti	Rainforest regrowth
10	Battle for the Eagles	29 November 1987	Tony Soper	Eagles
11	Okavango, Jewel of the Kalihari: Search for the Jewel	6 December 1987	Barry Paine	Wildlife of the Okavango Delta
12	Okavango, Jewel of the Kalihari: The Living Jewel	13 December 1987	Barry Paine	Wildlife of the Okavango Delta
13	Okavango, Jewel of the Kalihari: A New Challenge	20 December 1987	Barry Paine	Wildlife of the Okavango Delta

== Series 7 ==
Episode	Title	Original air date	Presenter/narrator	Subject matter or featured species
1	Ice Pack	18 September 1988	Barry Paine	Wildlife of the Canadian Arctic
2	Beyond Timbuktu	25 September 1988	Bruce Pearson	Wildlife of the Niger River
3	Nighthunters	2 October 1988	Judi Dench	Owls
4	Twilight of the Dreamtime	9 October 1988	David Attenborough	Wildlife of Kakadu, Australia
5	Search for the Yeti	16 October 1988	Andrew Sachs, Chris Bonington	Yeti
6	A Passion for Grouse	23 October 1988	Sally Magnusson	Red grouse
7	Nuts in Brazil	30 October 1988	Anthony Smith	Travel down the Amazon River
8	Kingdom of the Thunder Dragon	6 November 1988		Wildife of Bhutan
9	The Journey of Gerald Through Wales	13 November 1988		Wildlife of Wales
10	Coral Triangle	27 November 1988	Barry Paine	Wildlife of Philippines
11	Wild Waterfalls: The Natural History of Cascades	1 January 1989	Jenni Murray	Waterfalls
12	Atlantic Realm: Island Arks	8 January 1989	Martin Jarvis	Wildife of the Atlantic Ocean
13	Atlantic Realm: Ocean Of Light	15 January 1989	Martin Jarvis	Wildife of the Atlantic Ocean
14	Atlantic Realm: Into The Abyss	22 January 1989	Martin Jarvis	Wildlife of the Atlantic Ocean

== Series 8 ==
Episode	Title	Original air date	Presenter/narrator	Subject matter or featured species
1	Gorillas in the Midst of Man	1 October 1989	Brian Blessed	Gorilla
2	Ivory Wars	8 October 1989	Julian Pettifer	Trade in African Elephant ivory
3	Gran Paradiso	15 October 1989	Anthony Valentine	Gran Paradiso National Park, Alps
4	Fear of the Wild	22 October 1989	Anthony Valentine	Phobias of wild animals
5	Splashdown: A Diver's Natural History	29 October 1989	Martha Holmes	Marine life off the British coast
6	Island in the Air	5 November 1989	Christopher Reich	Wildlife of the Bale Mountains, Ethiopia
7	Amazon, the Flooded Forest: Part 1	19 November 1989	Anthony Hopkins	Amazon rainforest
8	Amazon, the Flooded Forest: Part 2	26 November 1989	Anthony Hopkins	Amazon rainforest
9	A Tramp in the Darien	3 December 1989	Jonathan Maslow	Darien National Park, Panama
10	The Taming of the Ewe	10 December 1989	Joe Henson	Sheep domestication
11	Under the Ice	17 December 1989		Life under the Antarctic ice sheet
12	The Sisterhood	7 January 1990	Richard Goss	Spotted hyena
13	Erin Through the Mists of Time	14 January 1990	Eamon de Buitlear	Wildlife of Ireland
14	The Serpent's Embrace	21 January 1990	Christopher Reich	Snakes
15	Haida Gwaii, Islands of the People	28 January 1990	May Russ	Haida Gwaii, Canada
16	La Loire Sauvage	4 February 1990		Campaign against dam on the Loire, France

== Series 9 ==
Episode	Title	Original air date	Presenter/narrator	Subject matter or featured species
1	Running for their Lives	6 January 1991	Hugh Miles	African wild dog
2	Scandinavia: Lands of the Midnight Sun	13 January 1991	Martin Jarvis	Scandinavia above the Arctic Circle
3	Scandinavia: Fresh Waters, Salt Seas	20 January 1991	Martin Jarvis	Waters around Scandinavia
4	The Cat That Came in from the Cold	27 January 1991		European polecat
5	Portrait of the Planet	3 February 1991		Nature around the world
6	Two Weeks to Save the Planet	10 February 1991	Anthony Smith	Earthwatch Institute
7	Cranes of the Grey Wind	17 February 1991		Sandhill and Whooping cranes
8	Even The Animals Must Be Free	3 March 1991		On safari in Africa
9	Marathon Birds	10 March 1991		Albatross
10	The Great Karoo, a Secret Africa	17 March 1991	Janet Suzman	Karoo, South Africa
11	Big Oil: in the Wake Of Exxon Valdez	24 March 1991	Julian Pettifer	Exxon Valdez oil spill
12	Wings Over the Holy Land	31 March 1991		Bird migration in Israel
13	Hawaii, Beyond the Feathered Gods	14 April 1991		Wildlife of the Hawaiian Islands

== Series 10 ==
Episode	Title	Original air date	Presenter/narrator	Subject matter or featured species
1	Vietnam: the Country not the War	24 November 1991	Brian Gear	Vietnam
2	Arctic Wanderers	1 December 1991	Barry Paine	Caribou migration in the American Arctic
3	The Wonderful World of Dung	8 December 1991	Tony Robinson	Dung
4	Monkeys on the Edge	15 December 1991	Rula Lenska	Endangered monkeys in the Brazilian Atlantic Forest
5	Sounds of the Islands	22 December 1991	Isla Blair	Outer Hebrides
6	Sharks on their Best Behaviour	9 February 1992	Mike DeGruy	Shark
7	Land of Wild Freedom	16 February 1992	Fred Trueman	North York Moors
8	The Monk, the Princess and the Forest	1 March 1992		Thailand rainforest
9	New Guinea, an Island Apart: Beyond The Unknown Shore	8 March 1992	Tim Pigott-Smith	Coral reefs off New Guinea
10	New Guinea, an Island Apart: Other Worlds	15 March 1992	Tim Pigott-Smith	Rainforests of New Guinea
11	Bird Nuts: The Magnificent Obsession	22 March 1992	Martin Wainwright	Birdwatching, Cape Vulture ringing
12	For Queen and Colony	29 March 1992		Bees and wasps
13	Mpingo, the Tree that Makes Music	3 May 1992	David Attenborough	Mpingo trees

== Series 11 ==
Episode	Title	Original air date	Presenter/narrator	Subject matter or featured species
1	Echo of the Elephants	3 January 1993	David Attenborough, Cynthia Moss	African elephant
2	Shadows in a Desert Sea	10 January 1993		Gulf of California
3	Cougar, Ghost of the Rockies	17 January 1993		Cougar
4	Kimberley, Land of the Wandjina	24 January 1993		Kimberley region
5	Journey to the Dark Heart	31 January 1993	Martin Jarvis	Western lowland gorilla
6	Ice Fox	7 February 1993	Bob Peck	Arctic fox
7	The Great Bears of Alaska	21 February 1993	John Shrapnel	Kodiak bear
8	The Little Creatures who Run the World	28 February 1993	Edward Wilson	Ants
9	Strandwolf, Survivor of the Skeleton Coast	7 March 1993	John Shrapnel	Brown hyena
10	Ibera, the Land of Shining Water	14 March 1993	John Waters	Iberá Wetlands, Argentina
11	The Ghosts of Ruby	21 March 1993	Julian Pettifer	Ruby, Arizona
12	Sanctuaries of Defence	28 March 1993	Christian Rodska	Wildlife on Ministry of Defence (United Kingdom) land
13	Treasure of the Andes	4 April 1993	John Shrapnel	Torres del Paine National Park, Chile
14	Cheetahs and Cubs in a Land of Lions	11 April 1993	Rula Lenska	Cheetah and lion
15	The Burning Question	18 April 1993		Wildfire in Yellowstone National Park
16	Secrets of the Golden River	25 April 1993		Rio Negro (Amazon)

== Series 12 ==
Episode	Title	Original air date	Presenter/narrator	Subject matter or featured species
1	Sex, Hot Eruptions and Chilli Peppers	20 February 1994	Barry Paine	Looking back at 25 Years of the Natural World
2	Firebird	27 February 1994	Josette Simon	Lesser flamingo
3	Killer Whales: Wolves of the Sea	6 March 1994	David Attenborough	Killer whale
4	Toadskin Spell	13 March 1994	Robert Lindsay	Frogs and toads
5	Island of the Ghost Bear	20 March 1994	John Sparks	American black bear
6	Webs of Intrigue	27 March 1994	Barry Paine	Gladiator spider, Australian funnel-web spider
7	Vampires, Devilbirds and Spirits: Tales of the Calypso Isles	3 April 1994	Paul Keens-Douglas	Trinidad & Tobago
8	Pandas of the Sleeping Dragon	4 April 1994	John Shrapnel	Wolong National Nature Reserve, China
9	The Witness Was a Fly	17 April 1994	Zakaria Erzinçlioğlu	Forensic science using animals and plants
10	Untangling the Knot	24 April 1994	Ian McShane	Red knot
11	Snowdonia: Realm of Ravens	8 May 1994		Common raven
12	Race for Life: Africa's Great Migration	15 May 1994	John Shrapnel	Wildebeest
13	Islands in the African Sky	22 May 1994	John Hurt	Mount Kenya, Aberdare Range and Mount Kilimanjaro
14	Comrades of the Kalahari	29 May 1994	Marco Visalberghi	Yellow mongoose, Cape ground squirrel

== Series 13 ==
Episode	Title	Original air date	Presenter/narrator	Subject matter or featured species
1	Mysteries of the Ocean Wanderers	27 November 1994	David Attenborough	Albatross
2	Badlands	4 December 1994		Prairie dog
3	Hunters of the Sea Wind	11 December 1994	Christian Rodska	Marlin, sailfish, sea snake, dolphin, tuna, turtle
4	Parrots: Look Who's Talking!	15 January 1995	Tony Robinson	Parrot
5	Avenue of the Volcanoes	22 January 1995		Mountain range in Ecuador
6	Ytene, England's Ancient Forest	29 January 1995	John Nettles	New Forest, Hampshire
7	Gentle Jaws of the Serengeti	12 February 1995	Barry Paine	Spotted hyena
8	Monkey in the Mirror	19 February 1995	Geraldine James	Bonobo
9	Ocean Drifters	26 February 1995	Tony Soper	Loggerhead sea turtle
10	The Call of Kakadu	5 March 1995	David Curl	Kookaburra
11	The Riddle of the Sands	19 March 1995	Bill Paterson	Ythan Estuary, Scotland
12	Jewels of the Caribbean	2 April 1995	Joss Ackland	Caribbean Sea
13	Survival of the Fittest: a Natural History of Sport	16 April 1995	Des Lynam	Wildlife on sport grounds
14	Sulawesi: an Island Bewitched	23 April 1995	Ian Holm	Sulawesi
15	The Little Creatures of Africa's Hidden World	30 April 1995	Andrew Sachs	Dung beetle, tick, termite

== Series 14 ==
Episode	Title	Original air date	Presenter/narrator	Subject matter or featured species
1	Echo of the Elephants: The Next Generation	14 January 1996	David Attenborough, Cynthia Moss	African elephant
2	Incredible Suckers	21 January 1996	David Attenborough, Mike DeGruy	Cephalopod, nautilus, vampire squid
3	Arctic Kingdom: Life at the Edge	28 January 1996	Tony Soper	Polar bear, narwhal, guillemots
4	Fifi's Boys: a Story of Wild Chimpanzees	4 February 1996	Bernard Cribbins, Jane Goodall	Chimpanzee
5	Rhythms of Life	11 February 1996		Influence of the Sun and Moon on life
6	Lions: Pride in Peril	18 February 1996	David Attenborough, John Sparks	Masai lion
7	Monsoon	25 February 1996		Indian Monsoon
8	Crossroads of Nancite	3 March 1996	Andrew Sachs	Crocodile, monkey, coyote, turtle
9	Last Feast of the Crocodiles	10 March 1996	John Shrapnel	Crocodile, baboon, hippopotamus
10	Bowerbird: Playboy of the Australian Forest	17 March 1996	Barry Paine	Satin bowerbird, Australian brushturkey, echidna
11	Hightops of Scotland	24 March 1996		Deer, hare, rock ptarmigan
12	Attenborough in Paradise	8 April 1996	David Attenborough	Bird-of-paradise

== Series 15 ==
Episode	Title	Original air date	Presenter/narrator	Subject matter or featured species
1	Sperm Whales: Back from the Abyss	6 October 1996	David Attenborough	Sperm whale
2	Mara Nights	13 October 1996	Andrew Sachs	
3	Penguins In and Out of Water	20 October 1996	Tony Soper	Penguin
4	Mandrills: Painted Faces of the Forest	27 October 1996	John Shrapnel	Mandrill
5	Beetlemania	3 November 1996	Thomas Eisner	Beetle
6	The World in a Wood	10 November 1996		
7	Himalaya	17 November 1996	John Shrapnel	Red panda, snow leopard, Himalayan monal
8	Wolves and Buffalo: an Ancient Alliance	19 January 1997	Jeff Turner	American bison, gray wolf
9	Benguela and the Burning Shore	26 January 1997	Tim Pigott-Smith	
10	A Lemur's Tale	2 February 1997	Zoë Wanamaker	Ring-tailed lemur
11	Grand Canyon: From Dinosaurs to Dam	16 February 1997	Tim Pigott-Smith	
12	Wings over the Serengeti	23 February 1997	Ian Holm	Vulture
13	New Guinea: an Island Apart	2 March 1997	Tim Pigott-Smith	
14	The Wild Dog's Last Stand	9 March 1997	Barry Paine	African wild dog
15	Postcards from the Past	16 March 1997	Anna Grayson	Scorpion, Neanderthal
16	People of the Sea	30 March 1997	Shane Mahoney	

== Series 16 ==
Episode	Title	Original air date	Presenter/narrator	Subject matter or featured species
1	Africa's Forgotten Elephants	12 October 1997	David Attenborough, Cynthia Moss	African bush elephant, African forest elephant
2	Puma, Lion of the Andes	19 October 1997	Tim Pigott-Smith	Puma
3	The Temple Troop	26 October 1997	Roshan Seth	Toque macaque
4	Denali: the Great Alaskan Wilderness	2 November 1997	Miranda Richardson	
5	Jungle Nights	9 November 1997	Tim Pigott-Smith	Jaguar, margay, kinkajou, ocelot, bat, frog
6	Paracas and the Billion Dollar Birds	16 November 1997	Ian Holm	Pelican, booby, guanay cormorant, penguin, sea lion
7	Komodo Dragon	23 November 1997	John Shrapnel	Komodo dragon
8	At the Edge of the Sea	30 November 1997	Gareth Armstrong	Acorn barnacle, mussel
9	Beyond the Naked Eye	7 December 1997		
10	On the Path of the Reindeer	21 December 1997	Geoffrey Palmer	Reindeer
11	The Secret Garden	27 December 1997	Patricia Routledge	
12	The Dragons of Galapagos	18 January 1998	David Attenborough	Iguana
13	Three Monkeys	25 January 1998	Emily Richard	Howler monkey, red-faced spider monkey, white-headed capuchin
14	Borneo: Island in the Clouds	1 February 1998	John Shrapnel	Proboscis monkey, Borneo elephant, Sumatran rhinoceros, orangutan
15	Oman: Jewel of Arabia	15 February 1998	Ian McShane	
16	The Lost Lands of Scilly	22 February 1998	Tim Pigott-Smith	Grey seal, great black-backed gull, lesser white-toothed shrew
17	Fire and Ice: an Icelandic Saga	1 March 1998	Magnus Magnusson	Arctic fox, puffin, skua
18	Metropolis	8 March 1998	Nigel Hawthorne	Falcon, raccoon, horseshoe crab
19	The Otters of Yellowstone	15 March 1998	Tom Baker	North American river otter, coyote
20	The Forbidden Fruit	22 March 1998	James Grout	

== Series 17 ==
Episode	Title	Original air date	Presenter/narrator	Subject matter or featured species
1	South Georgia: an Island All Alone	11 October 1998	David Attenborough	
2	Capybara: Swamp Hogs	18 October 1998	Stephen Fry	Capybara
3	Secret Sharks	25 October 1998	Christian Rodska, Mike Rutzen	Whale shark, horn shark
4	Mountain of the Sea	1 November 1998	Paul Herzberg	Black eagle, penguin
5	Orangutans: the High Society	8 November 1998	Andrew Sachs	Orangutan
6	The Fatal Flower	15 November 1998	Honor Blackman	Orchid
7	Vanishing Pools of the Zambezi	22 November 1998	Martin Jarvis	African elephant, African buffalo, impala
8	Manu: Amazon Paradise	29 November 1998	Ian Holm	Jaguar, giant otter, sloth, monkey
9	Impossible Journeys	6 December 1998	Peter Jones	
10	Cheetahs in a Hot Spot	13 December 1998	Veronika Hyks	Cheetah
11	Dolphins: the Wild Side	17 January 1999	Ian Holm	Dolphin
12	Year of the Jackal	24 January 1999	Eleanor Bron	Jackal
13	Everglades: to Hell and Back	31 January 1999	Tim Pigott-Smith	
14	The Man-Eaters of Tsavo	28 February 1999	Art Malik	Masai lion
15	Tough Ducks	21 February 1999	Bill Oddie	Duck
16	Islands of the Vampire Birds	14 March 1999	David Attenborough	Vampire finch
17	The Farm that Time Forgot	21 March 1999	Jonathan Dimbleby	
18	Iran: Secrets of the North	28 March 1999	John Shrapnel	

== Series 18 ==
Episode	Title	Original air date	Presenter/narrator	Subject matter or featured species
1	Riddle of the Right Whale	3 October 1999		Right whale
2	Hokkaido: Garden of the Gods	10 October 1999	John Hurt	Crane, brown bear, eagle
3	Elephants of the Sand River	17 October 1999		African elephant
4	In the Company of Bears	24 October 1999	Miranda Richardson	American black bear
5	The Millennium Oak	30 December 1999	Tom Baker	English oak, common raven
6	Wild Indonesia: Island Castaways	23 January 2000	John Lynch	Komodo dragon, tree kangaroo
7	Wild Indonesia: Underwater Wonderland	30 January 2000	John Lynch	Barracuda, manta ray
8	Wild Indonesia: Magical Forests	6 February 2000	John Lynch	Sumatran elephant, flying fox
9	The Tiger's Tale	20 February 2000	Meera Syal	Bengal tiger
10	Midway: Island of Life	5 March 2000	N/A	Spinner dolphin
11	The Wolf's Return	8 May 2000	Karen Archer, Paul Young	Gray wolf
12	Monkey Warriors	15 May 2000		Monkey
13	Dangerous Australians	22 May 2000		Redback spider, Australian funnel-web spider
14	Crater: Africa's Predator Paradise	5 June 2000	John Hannah	Wildebeest
15	Salmon: The Silver Tide	19 June 2000	Denis Lawson	Salmon
16	Claws	10 July 2000	Chris McCalphy	Crab
17	The Story of an African Wild Dog	?		African wild dog

== Series 19 ==
Episode	Title	Original air date	Presenter/narrator	Subject matter or featured species
1	Otters in the Stream of Life	8 October 2000	Sally Magnusson	European otter, dolphin, shark, whale, puffin
2	Camels Down Under	15 October 2000		Australian feral camel
3	Deadly Vipers	22 October 2000	Paul Young	Viper
4	The Tigers' Fortress	29 October 2000	Valmik Thapar	Bengal tiger
5	Big Red Roos	5 November 2000	Robert Llewellyn	Red kangaroo
6	Killer Whales: Up Close and Personal	19 November 2000		Killer whale
7	Madagascar: Land of Lemurs	26 November 2000		Lemur
8	Seychelles: Jewels of a Lost Continent	10 December 2000	Paul Young	Aldabra giant tortoise, coco de mer
9	Bowerbirds: The Art of Seduction	17 December 2000	David Attenborough	Bowerbird
10	The Last Tusker	21 January 2001		Sri Lankan elephant
11	Seals: Invaders of the Sea	28 January 2001		Seal
12	Killer Bees and Magic Trees	4 February 2001	Gerald Kastberger	Asian giant honey bee
13	Hippo Beach	18 February 2001	Stephen Fry	Hippopotamus
14	Timeless Thames	25 February 2001	Ian McShane	
15	Coyote: the Ultimate Survivor?	18 March 2001		Coyote
16	Transylvania: Living with Predators	25 March 2001	Andrew Sachs	Gray wolf, brown bear
17	Danube Delta: Europe Untamed	15 April 2001		Goose, pelican, beluga sturgeon
18	Buffalo: The African Boss	31 July 2001		African buffalo

== Series 20 ==
Episode	Title	Original air date	Presenter/narrator	Subject matter or featured species
1	The Lost Elephants of Timbuktu	7 October 2001	David Attenborough, Anne Orlando	African elephant
2	Yellowstone: America's Sacred Wilderness	14 October 2001	Paul Schullery	Gray wolf, elk, brown bear
3	Wild Nights	21 October 2001	Simon King	Badger, red fox, owl
4	Hotel Heliconia	4 November 2001	Robert Lindsay	Heliconia, hummingbird, bat, frog, viper, mosquito
5	Night Stalkers	18 November 2001		Fringe-lipped bat, fruit bat, vampire bat
6	Treasure Islands	25 November 2001	John Nettles	
7	Leopard Hunters	2 December 2001	Andrew Sachs	Leopard
8	War Wrecks of the Coral Seas	9 December 2001		
9	The Alps	16 December 2001	Andrew Sachs	Brown bear, gray wolf, golden eagle, ibex
10	A Wild Dog's Story	20 January 2002	Tico McNutt	African wild dog
11	Killer Whales of Monterey Bay	27 January 2002	Andrew Sachs	Killer whale
12	The Canine Conspiracy	24 February 2002	Richard Briers	Domestic dog
13	The Cat Connection	3 March 2002	Charles Dance	Domestic cat
14	Top Bat	10 March 2002	Mike Gunton, Sanjeev Bhaskar, Rebecca Hosking	Vampire bat
15	Amazon: Super River	17 March 2002		Piranha
16	Rhinos: Built to Last?	24 March 2002	Robert Lindsay	Rhinoceros

== Series 21 ==
Episode	Title	Original air date	Presenter/narrator	Subject matter or featured species
1	Meerkats: Part of the Team	13 October 2002	Simon King	Meerkat
2	Danger in Tiger Paradise	20 October 2002	Valmik Thapar	Bengal tiger
3	Falklands: Flying Devils	27 October 2002	Jane Watson, Mark Smith	Striated Caracara
4	The Crossing	3 November 2002		Zebra, wildebeest, gazelle, crocodile, lion
5	Death Trap	17 November 2002	John Nettles	Whale, seal, shark, brown bear, bald eagle, fish
6	My Halcyon River	24 November 2002	Charlie Hamilton James, John James	European otter, European mink, common kingfisher, mayfly, trout, moorhen, mallard
7	Killer Ants	1 December 2002		African driver ant, jack jumper ant
8	A Life with Cougars	15 December 2002	Jeff Turner, Sue Turner	Cougar
9	Cats Under the Serengeti Stars	1 January 2003	Charlotte Rampling	Caracal, hyena
10	Wild Women of Viramba	15 January 2003	John Shrapnel, Holly Carroll	Yellow baboon
11	Killer Bees: Taming the Swarm	19 January 2003		Africanized honey bee
12	Highgrove: A Prince's Legacy	26 January 2003	David Attenborough	
13	Flying Home	2 February 2003	John Peel	Whooping crane
14	The Elephant, The Emperor and Butterfly Tree	2 March 2003	Mark Strickson	African elephant, emperor moth, mopane
15	Indonesia, Fire Islands	30 March 2003	Anthony Valentine	

== Series 22 ==
Episode	Title	Original air date	Presenter/narrator	Subject matter or featured species
1	Lost Crocodiles of the Pharaohs	12 October 2003	Sean Pertwee	Nile crocodile
2	Elephant Cave	19 October 2003	Kenneth Cranham	African elephant
3	White Shark/Red Triangle	26 October 2003	Bert Pence	Great white shark, elephant seal
4	Tigers of the Emerald Forest	16 November 2003	Raghu Chundawat, Joanna Van Gruisen	Bengal tiger
5	Dune	23 November 2003	Brian Cox	
6	The Monkey Prince	30 November, 2003	Kristin Scott Thomas	Monkey
7	Five Owl Farm	7 December 2003	Robert Hardy	Barn owl, little owl, long-eared owl, short-eared owl, tawny owl
8	The Eagle Has Landed	2 January 2004		Osprey, red kite, sea eagle
9	Swamp Cats	9 January 2004	Jeremy Northam	Lion
10	Caribou and Wolves: The Endless Dance	16 January 2004	Jeff Turner	Caribou, wolf
11	Missing... Presumed Eaten	23 January 2004	Sean Barrett	Crocodile
12	A Moose Named Madeline	8 February 2004	Richard E. Grant	Moose
13	The Amber Time Machine	15 February 2004	David Attenborough	Bee, midge, long-legged fly, thunder gnat, aphid, ant, mite, giant bean tree, balted tree, seaburn tree, nazareno tree, palm, stingless bee, assassin bug, tadpole, marsh beetle, diving beetle, poison dart frog, bromelia, damselfly, bamboo, minuet worm, fig, fig wasp, nematodes, scale insect, theropod dinosaur
14	Five Big Cats and a Camera	22 February 2004	David Attenborough	Cheetah, leopard, serval, caracal, lion
15	Ice Age Death Trap	29 February 2004	Sean Barrett	Saber-toothed cat, dire wolf, short-faced bear, Columbian mammoth, American mastodon, giant ground sloths, Camelops, Harlan's ground sloth, American lion, ancient bison, Hagerman horse, Teratornis
16	Ireland: Sculpted Isle	14 March 2004	Fergal Keane	
17	Wolf Pack	28 March 2004	Sean Pertwee	Gray wolf
18	Lion: Out of Africa?	11 April 2004	Jonathan Scott	Asian lion, domestic cow

== Series 23 ==
Episode	Title	Original air date	Presenter/narrator	Subject matter or featured species
1	Cheetahs: Fast Track to Freedom	14 October 2004	Simon King	Cheetah
2	Norfolk Broads: The Fall and Rise of a Great Swamp	21 October 2004	Dan Snow	Avocet, marsh harrier, crane
3	Desert Wolves of India	28 October 2004	? ( Produced by Mike Birkhead)	Indian wolf
4	Typhoon Island	18 November 2004	Sean Pertwee	
5	Mississippi: Tales of the Last River Rat	25 November 2004	Kenny Salwey	Beaver, snapping turtle, sturgeon, pelican, eagle
6	Hammerhead	2 December 2004	Ian Holm	Hammerhead shark
7	The Wild Wood	9 December 2004	Philippa Forrester	Eurasian sparrowhawk, red fox, buzzard
8	Andes: The Dragon's Back	16 December 2004	Steven Berkoff	Flamingo, puma, penguin
9	Land of the Falling Lakes	5 January 2005	John Shrapnel	Brown bear, lynx, gray wolf, salamander
10	Echo of the Elephants: The Final Chapter?	19 January 2005	David Attenborough, Cynthia Moss	African elephant
11	Shark Coast	26 January 2005	David Attenborough	Pyjama shark, leopard catshark
12	Serengeti 24	3 February 2005	Michael Praed	Cheetah
13	Secrets of the Maya Underworld	9 February 2005	Simon MacCorkindale	
14	A Boy Among Polar Bears	15 February 2005	Sean Pertwee, Jobie Weetalluktuk	Seal, narwhal, polar bear

== Series 24 ==
Episode	Title	Original air date	Presenter/narrator	Subject matter or featured species
1	The Orangutan King	19 October 2005	Paul McGann	Orangutan
2	Eagle Island	26 October 2005	Gordon Buchanan	Sea eagle, golden eagle, otter, seal, dolphin, whale, shark
3	The Queen of Trees	2 November 2005	Ian Holm	Sycamore fig, fig wasp
4	King Cobra...and I	9 November 2005	Romulus Whitaker	King cobra
5	Return of the Eagle Owl	16 November 2005	Roy Dennis	Eagle owl
6	Cuba: Wild Island of the Caribbean	23 November 2005	Christian Rodska	Bee hummingbird, purple land crab and other land crabs, Cuban crocodile, sea turtle, iguana, Caribbean reef shark, Cuban hutia, Cuban parrot, turkey vulture, Cuban trogon, Cuban woodpecker, Cuban trama
7	Flying with Condors	30 November 2005	Judy Leden	Andean condor
8	Ella: A Meerkat's Tale	7 December 2005	Amanda Root	Meerkat
9	Wild Harvest	14 December 2005	Philippa Forrester	Lapwing, skylark, dormouse, barn owl
10	Australia: Taking the Heat	28 December 2005	Jeremy Northam	Red kangaroo, frog, koala
11	Penguins of the Antarctic	11 January 2006	Steven Berkoff	Penguin
12	Portillo Goes Wild in Spain	18 January 2006	Michael Portillo	Lynx, brown bear, vulture, bee-eater, killer whale
13	Ant Attack	25 January 2006	Andrew Sachs	African driver ant
14	Stalking the Jaguar	1 February 2006	Owen Newman, Amanda Barrett	Jaguar, caiman, peccary, capybara, domestic cow
15	Big Sky Bears	8 February 2006	Jeremy Northam	American black bear
16	The Iceberg That Sank the Titanic	1 March 2006	John Lynch	
17	Bonobo: Missing in Action	8 March 2006	Frances White	Bonobo
18	Satoyama, Japan's Secret Water Garden	27 July 2006	David Attenborough	

== Series 25 ==
Episode	Title	Original air date	Presenter/narrator	Subject matter or featured species
1	The Last Lions of India	18 October 2006	Dilly Barlow	Asiatic lion
2	On the Trail of Tarka	25 October 2006	John James, Philippa Forrester	European otter
3	Eye for an Elephant	1 November 2006	Martyn Colbeck	African elephant
4	The Bear Man of Kamchatka	8 November 2006	Jeff Turner, Charlie Russell	Brown bear
5	The Falls of Iguacu	15 November 2006	Hugh Quarshie	Toucan, capuchin monkey, jaguar, coati, swift
6	Africa's Desert Garden	9 January 2007	Alan Titchmarsh	
7	Toki's Tale	4 April 2007	Simon King	Cheetah
8	Battle To Save the Tiger	11 April 2007	David Attenborough	Bengal tiger
9	Buddha, Bees and the Giant Hornet Queen	25 April 2007	Geraldine James	Asian giant hornet, bee
10	Hawaii: Message in the Waves	2 May 2007	Iokepa Naeole	Turtle, dolphin, monk seal, albatross
11	Invasion of the Crocodiles	9 May 2007	Sam Hazeldine, Adam Britton	Saltwater crocodile
12	The Bloodhound and the Beardie	16 May 2007	Adrian Edmondson	Bloodhound, Bearded Collie
13	Saving Our Seabirds	23 May 2007	Roy Dennis	Puffin, guillemot, kittiwake, skua
14	Desert Lions	30 May 2007	David Attenborough	Lion
15	Moose on the Loose	1 June 2007	John Simm	Moose
16	Rainforest for the Future	6 June 2007	Jeremy Northam	African elephant, western lowland gorilla, chimpanzee, mandrill
17	Wye - Voices from the Valley	13 June 2007	? (produced by Charles Hamilton James and James McPherson)	

== Series 26 ==
Episode	Title	Original air date	Presenter/narrator	Subject matter or featured species
1	Snow Leopard - Beyond the Myth	4 January 2008	David Attenborough	Snow leopard
2	Raising Sancho	11 January 2008	Robert Bathurst	Giant otter
3	Earth Pilgrim - A Year on Dartmoor	18 January 2008	Satish Kumar	
4	Tiger Kill	25 January 2008	Simon King	Bengal tiger
5	White Falcon, White Wolf	1 February 2008	Simon Poland	Gyrfalcon, Arctic wolf
6	Saved by Dolphins	8 February 2008	Pete Gallagher	Dolphin
7	Badgers - Secrets of the Sett	15 February 2008	David Attenborough	European badger
8	Spacechimp	22 February 2008	Jeffrey Schaeffer	Chimpanzee
9	Elephant Nomads of the Namib Desert	26 March 2008	Russell Boulter	African elephant
10	Lobo: The Wolf that Changed America	2 April 2008	David Attenborough	Gray wolf
11	Reindeer Girls	9 April 2008	Stuart McQuarrie	Reindeer
12	Moose in the Glen	16 April 2008	John Hannah	Moose
13	Naabi - A Hyena Princess	23 April 2008	Aicha Kossoko	Spotted hyena
14	Spectacled Bears - Shadows of the Forest	6 May 2008	Stephen Fry	Spectacled bear
15	Superfish	14 May 2008	David Attenborough	Billfish
16	A Turtle's Guide to the Pacific	7 August 2008	Hugh Quarshie	Sea turtle
17	Jimmy and the wild honey hunters	10 August 2008	Jimmy Doherty	

== Series 27 ==
Episode	Title	Original air date	Presenter/narrator	Subject matter or featured species
1	Titus: The Gorilla King	11 November 2008	Bernard Hill	Mountain gorilla
2	Whale Shark	18 November 2008	Jessica Whittaker	Whale shark
3	Clever Monkeys	25 November 2008	David Attenborough	Monkey
4	Crocodile Blues	2 December 2008	Romulus Whittaker	Gharial
5	Cork: Forest in a Bottle	9 December 2008	Monty Don	Cork oak
6	Great White Shark - A Living Legend	2 January 2009	Peter Firth	Great white shark
7	Cuckoo	9 January 2009	David Attenborough	Common cuckoo
8	The Mountains of the Monsoon	16 January 2009	Sandesh Kadur	The wildlife of India's Western Ghats
9	Polar Bears & Grizzlies: Bears on Top of the World	23 January 2009	Peter Guinness	Polar bear, brown bear
10	Man-Eating Tigers of the Sundarbans	30 January 2009	Sanjeev Bhaskar	Bengal tiger
11	Elephants Without Borders	6 February 2009	Jeremy Northam	African elephant
12	Snow Monkeys	13 February 2009	Iain Glen	Japanese macaque
13	Cassowaries	19 February 2009	David Attenborough	Cassowary
14	A Farm for the Future	20 February 2009	Rebecca Hosking	Low-energy farming in Devon, England
15	Iron Curtain, Ribbon of Life	6 March 2009	Christian Rodska	A study of wildlife in the European Green Belt
16	Uakari: Secrets of the English Monkey	26 March 2009	Jeremy Northam	Red uakari

== Series 28 ==
Episode	Title	Original air date	Presenter/narrator	Subject matter or featured species
1	Bearwalker of the Northwoods	28 October 2009	Lynn Rogers	American black bear
2	Victoria Falls - The Smoke that Thunders	4 November 2009	Louis Mahoney	African fish eagle, baboon
3	Andrea - Queen of Mantas	11 November 2009	Alisdair Simpson	Manta ray
4	Black Mamba, White Witch	19 November 2009	Lenny Henry	Black mamba
5	Bringing Up Baby - The Natural History of a Mother's Love	26 November 2009	David Attenborough	Chimpanzee, lion, mouse
6	A Highland Haven	3 December 2009	Fergus Beeley	White-tailed eagle, black-throated diver
7	Radio Gibbon	10 December 2009	Adrian Edmondson	Gibbon
8	Birds of Paradise	6 January 2010	David Attenborough	Bird-of-paradise
9	The Secret Leopards	20 January 2010	Jonathan Scott	Leopard
10	The Chimpcam Project	27 January 2010	Stuart McQuarrie	Chimpanzee
11	Prairie Dogs - Talk of the Town	3 February 2010	Rob Brydon	Prairie dog
12	The Wild Places of Essex	10 February 2010	Robert Macfarlane	Common seal, knot, fallow deer, bearded tit, peregrine falcon, bittern, water vole, bluebell, brent goose
13	A Killer Whale Called Luna	24 February 2010	Michael Parfitt	Killer whale
14	Forest Elephants - Rumbles in the Jungle	4 March 2010	Richard Armitage	African forest elephant

== Series 29 ==
Episode	Title	Original air date	Presenter/narrator	Subject matter or featured species
1	The Monkey-Eating Eagle of the Orinoco	8 July 2010	Fergus Fawtly	Harpy eagle
2	Echo - An Unforgettable Elephant	5 August 2010	David Attenborough	African elephant
3	Sea Otters - A Million Dollar Baby	12 August 2010	Bonnie Greer	California sea otter
4	The Himalayas	19 August 2010	David Attenborough	Snow leopard, takin, gray langur, gray wolf, eagle
5	Africa's Dragon Mountain	2 September 2010	Iain Glen	Eland, Cape baboon, Cape vulture, Bearded vulture, Cape jackal
6	The Dolphins of Shark Bay	3 November 2010	Rupert Penry-Jones	Bottlenose dolphin
7	Panda Makers	7 December 2010	David Attenborough	Giant panda
8	Butterflies: A Very British Obsession	17 December 2010	Imelda Staunton	Butterfly
9	Miracle in the Marshes of Iraq	18 January 2011	David Johnson	Restoration of the Mesopotamian Marshes in southern Iraq
10	Elsa: The Lioness that Changed the World	1 February 2011	David Attenborough, Virginia McKenna	Lion
11	Chimps of the Lost Gorge	8 February 2011	Adrian Lester	Chimpanzee
12	A Tiger Called Broken Tail	15 February 2011	Colin Stafford-Johnson	Bengal tiger
13	One Million Snake Bites	22 February 2011	Romulus Whitaker	King cobra, saw-scaled viper, common krait, Russell's viper, Indian cobra, green pit viper
14	The Last Grizzly of Paradise Valley	1 March 2011	Jeff Turner	Brown bear

== Series 30 ==
Episode	Title	Original air date	Presenter/narrator	Subject matter or featured species
1	My Life as a Turkey: Natural World Special	1 August 2011	Joe Hutto	Wild turkey
2	Empire of the Desert Ants	10 August 2011	Andy Serkis	Honey ant
3	Heligan: Secrets of the Lost Gardens	17 August 2011	Philippa Forrester	Red fox, common toad
4	Komodo - Secrets of the Dragon	24 August 2011	Peter Capaldi, Bryan Fry	Komodo dragon
5	The Woman Who Swims with Killer Whales	31 August 2011	Ingrid Visser	Killer whale
6	Animal House	7 September 2011	David Attenborough	Various
7	Jungle Gremlins of Java	25 January 2012	Anna Nekaris, Paul McGann	Slow loris
8	Tiger Dynasty	1 February 2012	Amerjit Due	Bengal tiger
9	Grizzlies of Alaska	8 March 2012	Chris Morgan	Brown bear
10	Madagascar, Lemurs and Spies	15 March 2012	David Attenborough, Erik Patel	Silky sifaka, bamboo lemur, pygmy stump-tailed chameleon, helmet vanga, Malagasy paradise flycatcher, common sunbird-asity, Madagascar wagtail, ring-tailed mongoose
11	Zambezi	22 March 2012	James Frain	Hippopotamus, African elephant, water buffalo, zebra
12	Queen of the Savannah	29 March 2012	Tamsin Greig	African honey bee
13	The Real Jungle Book Bear	5 April 2012	David Attenborough, Ivo Nörenberg, Oliver Goetzl	Sloth bear, Indian peafowl, mongoose, Bengal tiger, sambar deer, bonnet macaque, Indian palm squirrel, leopard, Asian elephant, Indian chameleon, painted spurfowl, Indian skipper frog, lesser mouse-tailed bat
14	The Unnatural History of London	18 June 2012	Timothy Spall	Fallow deer, grey seal, European hedgehog, feral pigeon, peregrine falcon, grebe, European herring gull, red fox, red deer, great white pelican, mallard, red-eared slider, rose-ringed parakeet, European yellow-tailed scorpion, red swamp crayfish, signal crayfish, European badger

== Series 31 ==
Episode	Title	Original air date	Presenter/narrator	Subject matter or featured species
1	Living with Baboons: Natural World Special	19 July 2012	David Attenborough, Mat Pines	Hamadryas baboon
2	Tiger Island: Natural World Special	26 July 2012	Paul McGann, Alan Rabinowitz	Sumatran tiger
3	Queen of Tigers: Natural World Special	19 October 2012	Colin Stafford-Johnson	Bengal tiger named Machli
4	A Wolf Called Storm: Natural World Special	26 October 2012	Jeff Turner	Gray wolf
5	Attenborough's Ark: Natural World Special	9 November 2012	David Attenborough	Black lion tamarin, Sumatran rhinoceros, solenodon, olm, marvellous spatuletail, Darwin's frog, pangolin, Priam's birdwing butterfly, northern quoll, Venus' flower basket, cane toad
6	Jaguars - Born Free: Natural World Special	21 January 2013	Zoë Wanamaker	Jaguar
7	Kangaroo Dundee: Part One	26 January 2013	Juliet Stevenson	Kangaroo, wombat, camel, emu
8	Kangaroo Dundee: Part Two	2 February 2013	Juliet Stevenson	Kangaroo, wombat, camel, emu
9	Giant Otters of the Amazon	9 February 2013	Charlie Hamilton James	Giant otter
10	Flight of the Rhino	16 February 2013	Sean Bean	Black rhinoceros

== Series 32 ==
Episode	Title	Original air date	Presenter/narrator	Subject matter or featured species
1	Leopards - 21st Century Cats	17 May 2013	Romulus Whitaker	Leopard
2	Giant Squid: Filming The Impossible - Natural World Special	13 July 2013	David Attenborough	Giant squid
3	The Mating Game	19 July 2013	David Attenborough	Gorilla, wolf, flamingo, kagu
4	Sri Lanka - Elephant Island	9 August 2013	Martyn Colbeck	Asian elephant
5	Meet The Monkeys	6 September 2013	Colin Stafford-Johnson	Macaques
6	Orangutans - The Great Ape Escape	4 October 2013	Juliet Stevenson	Orangutan
7	Meerkats - Secrets Of An Animal Superstar	11 October 2013	David Attenborough	Meerkat
8	Walrus - Two Tonne Tusker	18 October 2013	Geoffrey Palmer	Pacific walrus
9	Killer Whales - Beneath The Surface	25 October 2013	Alec Newman	Killer whales
10	Vultures: Beauty in the Beast	31 January 2014	Charlie Hamilton James	Vulture

== Series 33 ==
Episode	Title	Original air date	Presenter/narrator	Subject matter or featured species
1	Africa's Giant Killers	11 April 2014	Imogen Stubbs	African bush elephant, African lion
2	Honey Badgers: Masters Of Mayhem	18 April 2014	Toby Jones	Honey badger
3	France: The Wild Side	25 April 2014	Paul McGann	Wolves, wild boar
4	Nature's Misfits	2 May 2014	Bill Bailey	various
5	The Pygmy Hippo - A Very Secret Life	9 May 2014	David Harewood	Pygmy hippo
6	The Bat Man Of Mexico	13 June 2014	David Attenborough	Lesser long-nosed bat
7	Penguin Post Office	24 July 2014	Juliet Stevenson	Gentoo penguin
8	Beavers Behaving Badly	31 July 2014	Rob Brydon	Beavers
9	A Bear With A Bounty	7 August 2014	Tamsin Greig	Black bear
10	Attenborough's Fabulous Frogs	28 August 2014	David Attenborough	Frogs

== Series 34 ==
Episode	Title	Original air date	Presenter/narrator	Subject matter or featured species
1	Africa's Fishing Leopards	24 February 2015	David Attenborough	Leopards
2	Super-Powered Owls	3 March 2015	Paul McGann	Owls
3	Galapagos: Islands of Change	10 March 2015	David Attenborough	Various
4	Growing Up Wild	26 March 2015	David Tennant	Tiger, mountain gorilla, polar bear
5	Iceland - Land of Ice and Fire	1 May 2015	Juliet Stevenson	Arctic fox, eider duck
6	Attenborough's Big Birds	16 June 2015	David Attenborough	Ostriches, kiwis
7	Mountain Lions: Big Cats in High Places	23 June 2015	David Attenborough	Mountain lions
8	Ireland's Wild River - The Mighty Shannon	16 July 2015	Colin Stafford-Johnson	River Shannon, kingfishers, red squirrels, pike
9	Ghost Bear Family	23 July 2015	Jeff Turner	Kermode bear
10	Return of the Giant Killers - Africa's Lion Kings	19 August 2015	Imogen Stubbs	Lion

== Series 35 ==
Episode	Title	Original air date	Presenter/narrator	Subject matter or featured species
1	Jungle Animal Hospital	14 April 2016	John Hannah	Spider monkey, scarlet macaw
2	Nature's Perfect Partners	19 May 2016	Bill Bailey	Various
3	Meet the Moose Family	28 April 2016	Hugo Kitching	Moose
4	Kangaroo Dundee and Other Animals Part I	5 May 2016	Juliet Stevenson	Camel, wombat, emu and kangaroo
5	Kangaroo Dundee and Other Animals Part II	12 May 2016	Juliet Stevenson	Camel, wombat, emu and kangaroo
6	Giraffes - Africa's Gentle Giants	23 June 2016	David Attenborough	Giraffe
7	My Congo	7 September 2016	Vianet Djenguet	Chimpanzees, elephants, gorillas
8	Jaguars - Brazil's Super Cats	14 September 2016	David Attenborough	Jaguar
9	Cheetahs: Growing Up Fast	2 February 2017	David Attenborough	Cheetah

== Series 36 ==
Episode	Title	Original air date	Presenter/narrator	Subject matter or featured species
1	Puerto Rico: Island of Enchantment	20 March 2017	David Attenborough	Manatees, iguaca, turtles
2	Hotel Armadillo	7 April 2017	David Attenborough	Giant armadillo
3	Nature's Wildest Weapons: Horns, Tusks and Antlers	18 April 2017	Nina Sosanya	Various
4	Nature's Miniature Miracles	15 May 2017	Hugh Dennis	Various
5	Supercharged Otters	20 June 2017	Charlie Hamilton James	Otter
6	Sudan: The Last Of The Rhinos	28 June 2017	David Harewood	Northern white rhinoceros
7	H is for Hawk: A New Chapter	19 October 2017	Helen Macdonald	Goshawk
8	Attenborough and the Empire of the Ants	28 December 2017	David Attenborough	Ant

== Series 37 ==
Episode	Title	Original air date	Presenter/narrator	Subject matter or featured species
1	Attenborough's Wonder of Eggs	31 March 2018	David Attenborough	A study of bird eggs
2	Nature's Biggest Beasts	19 April 2018	Miles Jupp	Large animals (giraffe, Komodo dragon, armoured ground cricket, Bornean blue earthworm, powelliphanta snail, giant hornet, red kangaroo, little red flying fox, freshwater crocodile, polar bear, mountain stone weta, African bush elephant, blue whale, kakapo, ostrich, Hatzegopteryx, wandering albatross, hippopotamus, southern elephant seal, coconut crab, Great Barrier Reef.)
3	Super Fast Falcon	26 April 2018	Peter Capaldi	Peregrine falcon
4	Red Ape: Saving the Orangutan	10 May 2018	Ivanno Jeremiah	Orangutan
5	Pangolins - The World's Most Wanted Animal	15 May 2018	David Attenborough	Pangolin
6	The Super Squirrels	19 June 2018	Olivia Colman	Squirrels
7	Humpback Whales: A Detective Story	8 February 2019	? (produced by Tom Mustill)	Humpback whale
8	Tasmania: Weird and Wonderful	31 March 2019	David Attenborough	Various

== Series 38 ==
Episode	Title	Original air date	Presenter/narrator	Subject matter or featured species
1	Florida: America's Animal Paradise	7 April 2019	Paul McGann	Gopher tortoise, Red-cockaded woodpecker, Florida manatee, American alligator, Florida panther, Burmese python, Key deer, Swallow-tailed kite
2	Hippos: Africa's River Giants	26 July 2019	David Attenborough	Hippopotamus
3	The Octopus In My House	22 August 2019	David Scheel	Day octopus
4	Weasels: Feisty and Fearless	25 October 2019	Julie Walters	Mustelidae
5	Meet the Bears	4 November 2019	Hugh Bonneville	Bear
6	Tigers: Hunting the Traffickers	4 March 2020	Aldo Kane	Tiger
7	Wild Cuba: A Caribbean Journey - Part 1	6 March 2020	Colin Stafford-Johnson	Various
8	Wild Cuba: A Caribbean Journey - Part 2	13 March 2020	Colin Stafford-Johnson	Various
9	Super Powered Eagles	20 March 2020	Alec Newman	Golden Eagle
