= 33rd News & Documentary Emmy Awards =

- Date: October 1, 2012
- Location: Rose Hall, Home of Jazz at Lincoln Center; New York City

The 33rd News & Documentary Emmy Awards were held on October 1, 2012, at Rose Hall, Home of Jazz at Lincoln Center, located in the Time Warner Center in New York City. They honored the best in American news and documentary programming in 2011. Awards were presented in 42 categories, including Breaking News, Investigative Reporting, Outstanding Interview, and Best Documentary. In attendance were over 900 television and news media industry executives, news and documentary producers and journalists.

Notable awards included the Lifetime Achievement Award given to news anchors Jorge Ramos and María Elena Salinas of Noticiero Univision.

== Winners ==
=== Network breakdown ===
The following chart is a breakdown of number of awards won this awards season per station.

Channel	Number of Emmys This Season
PBS	9
ABC	7
CBS	7
NBC	3
CNN	2
Discovery Channel	2
HBO	2
National Geographic Channel	1
CFR/MediaStorm	1
CNBC	1
Discovery Channel	1
The New York Times	1
Showtime	1
Science Channel	1
Smithsonian Channel	1
Time	1
WFAA (Dallas)	1
WTHR (Indianapolis)	1

=== Breakdown by program ===
Program	Channel	Number of Emmy's This Season
60 Minutes	CBS	5
CBS Evening News	CBS	1
48 Hours	CBS	1
Rock Center with Brian Williams	NBC	1
Dateline NBC	NBC	1
NBC News Education Nation	NBC	1
POV	PBS	5
Frontline	PBS	2
Independent Lens	PBS	1
Nature	PBS	1
ABC News Special Events	ABC	1
Brian Ross Investigates: Peace Corps – A Trust Betrayed	ABC	1
New Generation Explorers Campaign	National Geographic Channel	1
Rising: Rebuilding Ground Zero	Science Channel	1
Anderson Cooper 360°	CNN	1
Revolution in Egypt: President Mubarak Steps Down	CNN	1
The Tillman Story	Showtime	1
Crisis Guide: Iran	CFR/MediaStorm	1
Human Planet	Discovery Channel	1
Rising: Rebuilding Ground Zero: Stories from the Pile	Discovery Channel	1
New Generation Explorers Campaign	National Geographic Channel	1
HBO Documentary Films	HBO	2
Touch of Evil	NYTimes.com	1
Beyond 9/11: Portraits of Resilience	TIME.com	1
Decoding Immortality	Smithsonian Channel	1
WFAA News 8 at 10pm	WFAA (Dallas, Texas)	1
WTHR Eyewitness News Nightbeat	WTHR (Indianapolis, Indiana)	1

=== Awards ===
Lifetime Achievement Award	Chairman's Award
Jorge Ramos and María Elena Salinas of Noticiero Univision	
Regularly Scheduled Newscast	News Magazine
Coverage of a Breaking News Story; Gadhafi Speaks, ABC News Special Report/Nightline (ABC); Continuing Coverage of a News Story; Crisis in Libya, ABC World News (ABC); Feature Story; American Valor: The Land of the Brave, Nightline (ABC); Investigative Journalism; Gunwalker: Fast and Furious, CBS Evening News (CBS); Business And Economic Reporting; The Center for Public Integrity and ABC News Brian Ross Investigates: Green Energy: Contracts, Connections and the Collapse of Solyndra, Good Morning America, ABC World News & Nightline (ABC)	Coverage of a Breaking News Story; Revolution in Cairo, Frontline (PBS) (tie); Syria Undercover, Frontline (PBS) (tie); Continuing Coverage of a News Story; Grave Injustice, 48 Hours (CBS); Feature Story; Gospel for Teens, 60 Minutes (CBS); Investigative Journalism; Brian Ross Investigates: Peace Corps—A Trust Betrayed, 20/20 (ABC); Business And Economic Reporting; The Next Housing Shock, 60 Minutes (CBS); News Discussion And Analysis; Bullying: It Stops Here, Anderson Cooper 360° (CNN)
Long Form	Interview
Live Coverage of a Current News Story; Revolution in Egypt: President Mubarak Steps Down, CNN/CNN International (CNN); Continuing Coverage of a News Story; Where Soldiers Come From, POV (PBS); Investigative Journalism; Enemies of the People, POV (PBS); Informational Programming; The Tillman Story, Passion Pictures (Showtime); Historical Programming; Reagan, HBO Documentary Films (HBO); Business And Economic Reporting; Last Train Home, POV (PBS)	Sandusky Speaks, Rock Center with Brian Williams (NBC)
Programming	Best Story In A Regularly Scheduled Newscast
Arts & Culture; The Woodmans, Independent Lens (PBS); Science And Technology; Decoding Immortality, (Smithsonian Channel); Nature; My Life as a Turkey, Nature (PBS)	American Valor: The Land of the Brave, Nightline (ABC)
Best Report In A News Magazine	Best Documentary
Brian Ross Investigates: Peace Corps—A Trust Betrayed, 20/20 (ABC)	Beyond 9/11: Portraits of Resilience, (TIME.com)
New Approaches To News & Documentary Programming:	Individual Achievement In A Craft:
Current News Coverage; Crisis Guide: Iran (CFR/MediaStorm); Documentaries; Beyond 9/11: Portraits of Resilience, (TIME.com); Arts, Lifestyle & Culture; Touch of Evil (NYTimes.com)	Writing; Hard Times Generation ‑ Families in Cars, 60 Minutes (CBS); Research; Hard Times Generation ‑ Families in Cars, 60 Minutes (CBS); Cinematography - Nature; Survivors, Wild Pacific (Discovery Channel); Cinematography - News Coverage / Documentaries; Human Planet (Discovery Channel); Editing; 60 Minutes' Gospel for Teens (CBS); Editing–Documentary & Long Form; POV: Armadillo (PBS); Graphic Design & Art Direction; Rising: Rebuilding Ground Zero - Stories from the Pile (Science Channel); Music & Sound; HBO Documentary Films: Saving Pelican 895 (HBO); Lighting Direction & Scenic Design; NBC News' Education Nation Summit (NBC); Video Journalism – News; Rescue in the Mountains, Dateline NBC (NBC)
Promotional Announcement	Regional News Story
Institutional; New Generation Explorers Campaign (National Geographic Channel); Episodic; Rising: Rebuilding Ground Zero (Science Channel)	Spot News; A Day of Weather, WFAA News 8 at 10pm (WFAA (Dallas, Texas)); Investigative Reporting; Reality Check: Where Are The Jobs?, WTHR Eyewitness News Nightbeat (WTHR (Indianapolis, Indiana))

== Nominees ==
- By station

== Presenters ==
- George Stephanopoulos, anchor, Good Morning America and This Week
- Jeff Fager, chairman, CBS News and Executive Producer, 60 Minutes
- Bill Moyers, host, Moyers & Company
- Lara Logan, correspondent, CBS News and 60 Minutes, co-host Person to Person
- Fareed Zakaria, host, Fareed Zakaria GPS and Editor at Large, Time
- David Pogue, technical columnist, The New York Times and host, Nova ScienceNow
- Tamron Hall, anchor, MSNBC's NewsNation, frequent co-host, Today
- Marvin Scott, senior correspondent, WPIX, anchor/host of PIX News Close Up
- N. J. Burkett, correspondent, WABC-TV
- Bruce Paisner, President & CEO, International Academy of Television Arts and Sciences
