= My Life as a Turkey =

- Natural World episode
- Episode no.: Season 30; Episode 1
- Written by: Rachael Teel; Joe Hutto
- Cinematography by: Mark Smith, David Allen
- Original air dates: August 1, 2011 (UK); November 16, 2011 (US)
- Running time: 53 minutes (runtime)

Guest appearance
- Jeff Palmer (appearing as Joe Hutto in the recreations)

Episode chronology
← Previous "The Last Grizzly of Paradise Valley, Jungle Eagle"	Next → "Empire of the Desert Ants, Kangaroo Mob"

"My Life as a Turkey" is a television episode that premiered in 2011 in the UK on BBC (season 30 of the series Natural World, August 1) and in the US on PBS (season 30 of the series Nature, November 16). It won an Emmy Award for Outstanding Nature Programming. It was based on the book Illumination in the Flatwoods by naturalist Joe Hutto, who also co-wrote and hosted the TV program.

== Synopsis ==
My Life as a Turkey describes how Hutto raised a brood of wild turkeys. Hutto narrates over a re-creation of his time living with the birds, with actor Jeff Palmer playing Hutto. The turkey chicks imprinted on Hutto as they came out of the egg. He then led them on walks through the Florida woods. He describes how he learned their language and was impressed by their instincts and native intelligence. Eventually, after about a year, they became independent of him. The film shows footage of turkeys at all these ages, and is a re-enactment of the material described in Hutto's book.

== Development ==
In order to get the footage of Palmer living with wild turkeys, PBS recreated Hutto's entire experiment over the course of a year, with Palmer being imprinted by and living with the turkeys. Hutto stated in an interview that they were extremely lucky to have turkeys that had similar personalities to the ones in his book.

== Reception and media coverage ==
Hutto has been profiled in newspapers, with a focus on the program and book. The book was mentioned in The New Yorker.

== Awards ==
- Emmy - Outstanding Nature Programming (2012)
- Jackson Hole Wildlife Film Festival - Best Writing (2011)
