= Stuart Monro =

Professor Stuart Monro
- Stuart Monro at Siccar Point, May 2007
- Born: 3 March 1947 (age 79); Aberdeen, Scotland
- Occupation: Scientist

Stuart Kinnaird Monro OBE, FRSGS, FRSE (born 3 March 1947) is a Scottish geologist and science communicator. He is currently Chair of the Board of the Scottish Association for Marine Science.

== Early life ==
Monro graduated in geology from Aberdeen University in 1970 and then received his PhD from the University of Edinburgh while embarking upon a lengthy career with the British Geological Survey, making a number of distinguished contributions to the understanding of the geology of central Scotland and the application of geology to environmental issues.

== Career ==
He was instrumental in establishing Our Dynamic Earth in Edinburgh, the science centre and visitor attraction which opened in 1999 as a major Millennium Project that serves to facilitate a better public understanding of the processes that have shaped the earth. He took up the post of Scientific Director at Our Dynamic Earth on a permanent, part-time, basis on retiring from the British Geological Survey in 2004.

Monro has been a part-time tutor in Earth Sciences at the Open University from 1982 till 2009 and, from 1990 to 2002, served on the Open University's Senate, and Council from 1994 to 2002. He was awarded an honorary doctorate from the Open University in 2011 for "Services to the University" and "Academic and scholarly distinction".

He was made a Fellow of the Royal Scottish Society of Arts in 1998, and served as President of that Society from 2002 until 2005 and again from 2014 until 2017. He also served as president of the Westmorland Geological Society (1994–2005) and of the Edinburgh Geological Society (2005–2007). He has been co-Convenor of the Scottish Earth Science Education Forum since 2003, a voluntary group he helped establish to support a greater understanding of earth sciences in Scottish schools and colleges and chairs the Earth Science Trust. Also in 2003 he was appointed by Scottish Ministers to serve on the Scottish Science Advisory Council, a national forum which provides strategic advice to the Scottish Government on scientific issues. He was the council's first Independent Co-chair till he stood down as both co-chair and a member of the Council in 2009. He has also served as a Non-Executive Director of the Edinburgh International Science Festival, and served on the Royal Society of Edinburgh's Young People's Committee. He is honorary geological adviser to the John Muir Trust and in 2005 he was appointed by Scottish Ministers as a Trustee of the National Museums of Scotland, a role he continued till 2013. In 2009 he also took on the part-time position as Scientific Director of the Edinburgh Consortium for Rural Research now the Scottish Consortium for Rural Research. In 2011, he was elected a Fellow of the Society of Antiquaries of Scotland.

He was made an Honorary Fellow of the University of Edinburg] (School of Geosciences) in 2005 and from September 2007, he has also served as a member of the University Court of the University of Edinburgh. From September 2011 till 31 July 2014, he served as Vice-Convenor of Court. He was appointed a visiting professor in the School of Geosciences at the University of Edinburgh in February 2008 and an Honorary Professor from February 2014. In 2014 he was appointed as a member of the University Court of the University of St Andrews.

Monro is a Chartered Geologist and Fellow of the Geological Society and was awarded the Society's Distinguished Service Award in 2009. In 2010 he was elected a Fellow of the Royal Society of Edinburgh and in 2014 made an Honorary Fellow of the Royal Scottish Geographical Society. He has an honorary doctorate from the Open University (DUniv) from Heriot-Watt University (DSc) and from University of Edinburgh (DSc). He was awarded the title of Officer of the Order of the British Empire (OBE) for services to science in HM Queen Elizabeth II's New Year Honours list, announced on 30 December 2006.

In 2021, the Geological Society reprimanded Monro after allegations he "shouted, spat and made sexist comments" at Anna Grayson, former host of Natural World, at a 1999 Geological Society event, determining that he had behaved in an "unprofessional manner". The Society said that Monro's behaviour was "out of character" and confirmed that no further action would be taken.
