= Natural world =

Natural world may refer to the following:

- The non-human aspects of the physical universe, such as
  - Biosphere
  - Natural environment
  - Nature
- Natural World (TV series), a BBC wildlife documentary
