= Anna Grayson =

British Geologist

Anna Grayson is a British geologist, writer, broadcaster, and artist. She is known for bringing earth sciences to popular attention in the UK through numerous books and BBC radio and television series in the 1990s and early 2000s, particularly through the programmes Rock Solid, Postcards from the Past and The Essential Guide to Rocks. In 1996, Grayson made headlines around the world with the discovery of a blue mineral which at the time was believed to be hitherto unknown to science. After further research, the rock was confirmed to be an unusually large sample of the rare blue mineral, aerinite.

Since completing an access course at Exeter College of Art in 2012, Grayson has pursued a second career as an artist, focusing on photographic pastiches of famous works of art. Five of her works have been exhibited at the Royal Academy Summer Exhibition in London, and she has been featured on Grayson Perry's Art Club on Channel 4 television.

== Early life and education ==
Grayson is the daughter of Harry Grayson, a British scientist who helped to develop in-aircraft radar during the Second World War. She was educated at Walthamstow High School for Girls, and went on to read geology at the University of St. Andrews, graduating in 1974. She married Dr Desmond Clark in 1976.

== Media career ==
Following university, Grayson trained as a radio studio manager with the BBC. She went on to become a producer and presenter, featuring in segments on many popular series on BBC Radio 4 and Radio 5, including Science Now, Woman's Hour, The Food Programme, and You and Yours.

From the late 1980s to the early 2000s, Grayson fronted many factual radio and television series covering a variety of subjects. Her work primarily focused on popular science and she is best known for programmes which brought earth sciences into public imagination in the UK. A review of the book and TV programme Postcards from the Past in the journal Geology Today credited Grayson's persistence as a geologist and presenter for the "very welcome breakthrough for our science to have a programme devoted to geology". In 1997, she launched the inaugural Scottish Geology Week. She was a patron of and adviser to the Dynamic Earth exhibition in Edinburgh for five years, before resigning in 1999 over concerns about the costs.

=== Radio ===
Title	Station	Episodes	First Broadcast	Subject
Learn to Earn (Series 1)	BBC Radio 5	6	25 March 1991 – 29 April 1991	Exploring retraining and career opportunities for adults over 25
Kissing Frogs	BBC Radio 4	3	6 September 1991 – 12 October 1991	Documentary series analysing the direct marketing industry
Up to the Neck in It	BBC Radio 4	1	13 October 1991	The environmental challenges of farm waste
Learn to Earn (Series 2)	BBC Radio 5	6	10 February 1992 – 16 March 1992	Exploring retraining and career opportunities for adults over 25
Anna Goes to the Seaside	BBC Radio 5	6	5 July 1992 – 24 July 1992	Entertaining guide to a selection of British seaside towns
Rock Solid (Series 1)	BBC Radio 5	6	10 August 1992 – 14 September 1992	The geology of Britain
Dinomania	BBC Radio 4	1	3 January 1993	The magic, myths and metaphors of the dinosaur
Learn to Earn (Series 3)	BBC Radio 5	6	16 March 1993 – 27 April 1993	Exploring retraining and career opportunities for adults over 25
Rock Solid (Series 2)	BBC Radio 5	6	25 August 1993 – 29 September 1993	The geology of Britain
Choosing a School	BBC Radio 5	2	6 October 1993 – 13 October 1993	Guide to choosing primary and secondary schools in the UK
How Does Your Garden Grow	BBC Radio 2	6	28 October 1995 – 2 December 1995	The science of gardening, included visits to the gardens of various well-known figures including Judith Hann, Patrick Moore, Thelma Barlow, Bill Giles, Ken Livingstone, and Miriam Rothschild
The Magic Formula	BBC Radio 4	1	20 January 1996	The influence of mineralogy and alchemy on Mozart's The Magic Flute
Science in the Attic	BBC Radio 4	5	1 October 1998 – 29 October 1998	Profiling the achievements of amateur scientists

=== Television ===
Title	Channel	Episodes	First Broadcast	Subject
Earth – the Home Planet	Channel 4	5	29 April 1993	Educational series about Earth and the Solar System
Digging Deep	Anglia Television	1	1993	Archaeological excavations around the Castle Mall in Norwich
Postcards from the Past	BBC Two	1	16 March 1997	A history of the last 3 billion years of the British Isles, part of the BBC's Natural World strand
Live From Mars	BBC Two	1	5 July 1997	A look at the first images of Mars sent back by the NASA Pathfinder probe
The Essential Guide to Rocks	BBC Two	5	2 November 1998 – 7 December 1998	Major television series looking at the geology of the UK. Grayson was series consultant and writer, and co-hosted with Kate Humble, Ray Mears and Duncan Copp
Ology Hour	BBC Knowledge	1	15 September 1999	Exploring the world of fossils, dinosaurs, evolution and extinction

=== Books ===
- Rock Solid, The Natural History Museum, 1992
- Postcards from the Past, BBC Education, 1996
- Equinox: The Earth, Pan Macmillan, 2000
- Equinox Book of Science, Pan Macmillan, 2001 (co-author)
- Level Up Maths, Heinemann, 2008 (co-author)

== Contributions to public understanding of Earth Science ==
=== Blue mineral ===
In March 1996, Grayson made headlines around the world with the discovery of a blue mineral that could not be identified by scientists. She had purchased the rock at a roadside stall in Morocco in the early 1980s, where the seller had identified it as lapis lazuli, a relatively common blue mineral. During National Science Week, Grayson had taken the rock to an event run by the Natural History Museum in London, where museum staff were offering to help identify mysterious objects brought in by the public. After further research, the mineral was identified as aerinite, a rare bright blue mineral originating in Spain and Morocco.

=== Awards ===
In 1998, Grayson was awarded the R.H. Worth prize by the Geological Society of London, for encouragement of amateur interest in geology through the broadcast media.

In 1999, she won the Glaxo Wellcome ABSW Science Writers' Award for best science television, for her work on The Essential Guide to Rocks.

=== Combatting sexism ===
Throughout her career, Grayson has been a vocal force in the promotion of the role played by women in earth sciences and science more generally, as well as combatting sexism directed towards her. Whilst at a promotional photocall for The Essential Guide to Rocks, she declined the photographer's request that she pass her geological hammer to co-presenter Ray Mears, on the basis that she was the only trained geologist in the picture. In 2021, the geologist Stuart Monro was reprimanded by the Geological Society for verbally abusing Grayson at a dinner in 1999. Monro was accused of "shouting, spitting, and making sexist comments." Grayson made the complaint after being inspired by the MeToo movement.

== Art career ==
In 2012, Grayson enrolled on an art access course at Exeter College. For one assignment, she recreated Jan van Eyck's Arnolfini Portrait as a photographic pastiche, featuring modern-day subjects looking at their smartphones. The piece was highly commended by the South West Academy and in 2014 was hung at the Royal Academy Summer Exhibition in London. A further four more pastiches have appeared at the Summer Exhibition, including versions of Leonardo's Mona Lisa, The Kiss by Klimt, a still life depicting fossils and rocks, and, in 2024, Rembrandt's A Woman Bathing in a Stream. Her work has been featured on Grayson Perry's Art Club on Channel 4. In 2022 Grayson had a solo exhibition of photographs at the Royal Albert Memorial Museum in Exeter, entitled The Photographic Art Thief.
