= The Chimpcam Project =

The Chimpcam Project is a documentary featuring the first movie to be filmed entirely by chimpanzees. The chimpanzees do this using a "chimpcam" - a video recorder housed in a chimpanzee-proof box. The device is used by 11 chimpanzees living at the Edinburgh Zoo in the U.K. The experiment was the idea of producer John Capener and became part of the studies of primatologist Betsy Herrelko, who is studying for a Ph.D. in primate behaviour at the University of Stirling. The documentary was a co-production between the BBC strand Natural World and Animal Planet. It premiered on BBC Two on 27 January 2010.

== The "chimpcam" ==
The "chimpcam" consists of a receiver which is housed in a special chimpanzee-proof casing. Chimpanzees can see the video images various cameras are capturing and can decide via touch screen "...whether to watch footage of their outside enclosure, or the food preparation room, where zoo staff prepare the chimps' meals."
