= The Amber Time Machine =

- Natural World episode
- Episode no.: Series 22; Episode 12
- Written by: David Attenborough
- Original air date: 2004

"The Amber Time Machine" is the 12th episode of the 22nd series of the British wildlife documentary BBC television series Natural World and is presented by David Attenborough. It is It was first transmitted in 2004 and later became part of the Attenborough in Paradise and Other Personal Voyages collection of seven documentaries.

The documentary shows Attenborough searching for the identities of preserved creatures inside a piece of Baltic amber that was given to him by his adoptive sister when he was twelve years old. It then shows how a group of scientists can reconstruct an entire twenty million-year-old ecosystem through pieces of Dominican amber. Examples include a tadpole preserved in amber after falling from a bromeliad.

Attenborough then discusses the scientific feasibility of DNA being preserved in amber, and the science behind the 1993 hit techno-thriller Jurassic Park, in which his elder brother Richard Attenborough starred as John Hammond. Several attempts were tried, with DNA eventually being recovered from a weevil that was several million years older than Tyrannosaurus rex. Attenborough reasons that a few old, rare pieces of amber may contain DNA.

== See also ==
- List of Natural World episodes
