= MediaStorm =

American film production company

MediaStorm is a Los Gatos, California based film production and interactive design studio. The company produces online news stories using photography, interactivity, and video, and consults on interactive web projects.

== Content and services ==
The MediaStorm website features stories with an emphasis on photojournalism and social commentary. Their films have been picked up by The Los Angeles Times, The New York Times, The Atlantic, and The Washington Post. Notable projects include Marlboro Marine, The Sandwich Generation, Driftless, BLOODLINE: AIDS and Family, and Never Coming Home. MediaStorm runs auctions for media agencies to bid for the rights to run their stories. The site also offers for sale books that films are based on, music from the works, and other products from the film producers. Its clients include Apple Inc, the Council on Foreign Relations, The Los Angeles Times, MSNBC, National Geographic, and Starbucks, the first corporate client.

MediaStorm offers workshops on multimedia storytelling in addition to providing documentation on gathering audio, producing with Apple's Final Cut and Adobe Premiere Pro, and details on audio and video equipment.

== History ==
MediaStorm was founded on 16 November 2005 by Brian Storm, a graduate of the University of Missouri in photojournalism, a former director of multimedia at MSNBC.com and a former vice president of News, Multimedia & Assignment Services for Corbis, who wanted to get back to his "publishing roots". By 2007, they had been positively profiled in the Seattle Post-Intelligencer. In 2010, MediaStorm underwent a major site redesign.

== Awards ==
In 2013, MediaStorm was awarded the Edward R. Murrow Award for National Online News Organization Website. Since 2010, the company has been nominated for 15 Emmy Awards and won two Alfred Dupont Awards. In 2008, MediaStorm won an Emmy with the Council on Foreign Relations for Crisis Guide: Darfur, two Webby Awards and Best Use of Multimedia in the Pictures of the Year Contest. In 2007, MediaStorm won an Emmy for Kingsley's Crossing by Olivier Jobard, took first place in both the Best of Photojournalism Contest and Pictures of the Year, and won the Webby Award for the Magazine category.

A Tail of Identity, a 2009 short documentary about people identifying as furries, was produced as part of MediaStorm's storytelling workshop. It received an honorable mention at the International photography awards.

== See also ==
- Photojournalism
- Multimedia
