= Natural World (TV series) =

- 2013 series title card
- Also known as: The Natural World
- Genre: Nature documentary
- Narrated by: Various
- Country of origin: United Kingdom
- Original language: English
- No. of series: 38
- No. of episodes: 493 (list of episodes)

Production
- Producer: Various
- Editor: Various
- Running time: 50/60 minutes
- Production companies: BBC Natural History Unit; BBC Studios (2016-2020)

Original release
- Network: BBC Two, BBC Two HD
- Release: 30 October 1983 – 20 March 2020

Related
- The World About Us

Natural World (known as The Natural World until 2001) was a British nature documentary television series broadcast annually on BBC Two and BBC Two HD from 1983 to 2020. It was described by the BBC as its flagship natural history series. Each episode took an in-depth look at a particular natural history event, story or subject from around the globe, though occasionally a two- or three-episode miniseries would be shown.

Natural World was produced by the BBC Natural History Unit in Bristol under the stewardship of the series editor, who was responsible for commissioning or acquiring content. Approximately half of the programmes were produced in-house, with the remainder made up of collaborative productions with other broadcasters and acquisitions from independent producers. The series had close ties with the US series Nature, broadcast by PBS.

== History ==
Natural World began in 1983 as a successor to The World About Us, itself a long-running documentary strand on BBC Two.

The World About Us had been commissioned in 1967 by David Attenborough, at that time the Controller of BBC Two, to promote the new colour television service to British audiences. As the former head of the BBC's Travel and Exploration Unit in London, Attenborough realised that many of its telecine films had been shot in colour and would make ideal subjects for a documentary series, along with natural history content from the Bristol Unit and overseas broadcasters. The World About Us launched on 3 December 1967 to coincide with the first full evening of colour television in Britain, with Attenborough himself acting as series editor. The first episode in the series was "Volcano", a film by the French vulcanologist Haroun Tazieff; the Natural History Unit's first contribution was "Forest and Firebird" featuring the brilliantly coloured scarlet ibis. Programmes such as these were no accident: The World About Us was described by Barry Paine, a frequent producer and narrator during its first two decades, as "a series designed to sell colour television sets".

Due to the difficulty of sourcing colour films at the time, The World About Us started out with a broad remit of geography, anthropology and natural history as subject matter. Gradually, the contributions from the Travel and Exploration Unit diminished and the Natural History Unit's programmes grew in prominence. This was acknowledged by the BBC when the series was re-launched as The Natural World in 1983; the title subsequently shortened to Natural World in 2001. The first episode under the new title was "Save the Panda", broadcast on 30 October 1983 in what would become a regular time slot on Sunday evenings (where series editor Peter Jones claimed audiences were "hungry for natural history"). The World About Us continued until 1986.

The early series editors benefited from a generous budget, courtesy of a co-production partnership with the US broadcaster WNET. The American channel was keen to commission material for its recently launched Nature strand on PBS. The first programme to benefit from the partnership was the 1982 mini-series The Flight of the Condor. At the same time, researchers and field biologists were publishing many new discoveries about wildlife in scientific journals, providing the BBC with plentiful material for new programme ideas. As a result, the strand quickly expanded from 10 to 20 episodes by 1985 and a number of special programmes were commissioned, helped by additional funding from BBC Enterprises (now BBC Worldwide). Among them were the award-winning miniseries Kingdom of the Ice Bear (1985) and Vanishing Earth (1986).

David Attenborough maintained a close association with Natural World throughout its long history, narrating or presenting 62 episodes. In 2008, on the strand's 25th anniversary, he commented "I have no doubt that Natural World is not only the doyen and founding member of the 50-minute natural history genre but is still the one with the best and most distinguished record." Between 1993 and 2019, Mike Birkhead produced 24 episodes for Natural World, more than any other producer.

High-definition broadcasts of Natural World programmes started in 2008. They were shown on the BBC HD channel until its closure in 2013, following which they moved to BBC Two HD.

In the 2010s, the number of Natural World episodes per series began to reduce, and the strand no longer occupied a regular place in BBC Two's schedule. Although the BBC have not announced its cancellation, no new Natural World episodes have aired since 2020. The final episode, "Super Powered Eagles", aired on 20 March 2020, bringing to an end the longest-running nature documentary series on British television after 37 years and almost 500 episodes.

== Format, content and notable episodes ==
The World About Us helped to popularise the long-form documentary on British television thanks to its generous 50-minute length, a step up from the half-hour programmes which were more common at the time. Filmmakers were able to take advantage of this format to delve into a particular story in more detail, or cover broader themes.. The running time was extended to 60 minutes for later series.

The tone of the strand was set by its first series editor, Peter Jones, who gave his filmmakers the time and budget to explore their subjects in more detail. He also decided to avoid a house style in favour of a flexible approach where the style was chosen to match the subject of the documentary. This freedom from stylistic constraints gave filmmakers autonomy to make the programmes they wanted. As Natural World quickly established itself in the schedules, the series editors were able to take risks with unusual subjects which may otherwise have been avoided by broadcasters. According to Jones, "the idea was to give the audience a surprise each week. It was as far from the contemporary concept of formatted television as you could get." Some of the more unusual subjects have included plankton, wasps, cephalopods and manure ("The Wonderful World of Dung", 1991).

Jones's successors maintained the same ethos, mixing traditional "blue-chip" natural history with different approaches to storytelling. Mike Gunton, series editor from 2001 to 2004, introduced more human elements into the programmes, granted filmmakers additional time in the field to get the shots they needed and continued to experiment with style. "Cats Under Serengeti Stars" (2003) was filmed entirely in black and white and "Dune" (2003) was told from the point of view of a grain of sand.

Natural World programmes typically fall into three categories: strong, emotional stories; popular or unusual but interesting animal subjects; and films offering a different, personal perspective. Filmmakers were granted up to 100 days in the field, depending on how much archive material could be used.

Notable episodes presented or narrated by David Attenborough include the four Echo of the Elephants films (1993—2010) produced and directed by Mike Birkhead, which followed scientist Cynthia Moss and cameraman Martyn Colbeck on their lengthy study of an elephant herd in Kenya. In "Attenborough in Paradise" (1996), he fulfilled a lifelong ambition to observe and film the courtship displays of birds of paradise, whilst "The Amber Time Machine" (2004) saw him trace the origins of a piece of amber from the time of the dinosaurs. For "Attenborough's Ark" (2012), he selected his ten personal favourite species to save on an imaginary ark. The programme drew 3.2 million viewers, the strand's highest audience for eight years. Natural World's most-watched episode also featured Attenborough, this time as the narrator of "Highgrove, A Prince's Legacy" (2003). 4.8 million viewers watched Prince Charles explain the organic farming methods used on his Highgrove House estate.

For many years, the series regularly included documentaries on British wildlife, but they were later phased out. The last programme with a British theme was "An Unnatural History of London" in 2012, which featured the capital's urban wildlife. Another programme set in Britain, 2003's "My Halcyon River", became the most requested repeat by readers of Radio Times in the days following its transmission.

== Awards ==
Natural World programmes were regularly nominated at television industry awards and wildlife film festivals. Notable award-winners from the early years of the series include the 1986 Prix Italia for Vanishing Earth and an Emmy for cinematography for Kingdom of the Ice Bear. The Royal Television Society awarded Natural World the Best Documentary Strand in 1999 and photography prizes to the episodes "Mississippi, Tales of the Last River Rat" in 2005 and "Wye, Voices from the Valley" in 2007. "Mississippi, Tales of the Last River Rat" was also recognised at the Grierson Trust's British Documentary Awards in 2005.

Other award-winning episodes include "A Tiger Called Broken Tail", overall winner at the Jackson Hole Wildlife Film Festival in 2011 and Missoula's International Wildlife Film Festival (IWFF) in 2012; "Madagascar, Lemurs and Spies", a three-time winner at IWFF in 2012; "My Life As A Turkey", recipient of the Golden Panda at the Wildscreen Festival in 2012 and "Kangaroo Dundee", a prize-winner at Jackson Hole and IWFF in 2013.

H is for Hawk: A New Chapter co-directed by Mike Birkhead and Beth Jones won a Grierson Award for Best Natural History Film in 2018.

== Series editors ==
- Peter Jones (1983–1987) (also series editor of The World About Us 1979–1983)
- Andrew Neal (1987–1989)
- Mike Salisbury (1989–1993)
- John Sparks (1993–1997)
- Neil Nightingale (1997–2001)
- Mike Gunton (2001–2004)
- Tim Martin (2004–2011)
- Steve Greenwood (2011–2013)
- Roger Webb (2013–2020)
