= Goldberg Variations discography =

This is a list of commercial or professional recordings of Johann Sebastian Bach's Goldberg Variations, organized chronologically. The list is sortable by clicking on the small arrows at the top of each column.

Artist	Date	Place	Recording	Instrument and repeats
Serkin, Rudolf	c. 1928	Stuttgart	Welte piano rolls	piano
Landowska, Wanda	November 1933	Paris	EMI 5 6720 ADD	harpsichord
Arrau, Claudio	January–March 1942		RCA CD GD 87841 (not released until 1988)	piano
Landowska, Wanda	1945	New York City	RCA	harpsichord
Tureck, Rosalyn	1947		mono Allegro / Everest	piano
Kirkpatrick, Ralph	1952		mono Haydn Society	harpsichord
Leonhardt, Gustav	1953	Vienna	stereo Vanguard (the first of three recordings by this artist)	harpsichord
Demus, Jörg	June 1953	Austria	Nixa WLP 5241, mono	piano, 49 minutes
Ahlgrimm, Isolde	January 1954	Vienna	Philips, mono	Ammer harpsichord
Gould, Glenn	June 21, 1954	Toronto	from CBC broadcast, mono	piano, no repeats.
Gould, Glenn	June 10, 1955	New York City	Sony Classical 52 594 ADD; Goldberg Variations	piano (Steinway D-274), no repeats.
Richter, Karl	January 1956		Telefunken	harpsichord
Friskin, James	March 28, 1956	Masonic Temple, Brooklyn, New York	Bach Guild / Vanguard	harpsichord
Tureck, Rosalyn	1957	London, Abbey Road Studios	HMV / Capitol, 2 CD Philips "Great pianists of the century"	piano
Gould, Glenn	1959	live at Salzburg Festival	Sony Classical 52685 ADD	piano
Kirkpatrick, Ralph	1959		Deutsche Grammophon 439 673-2 ADD	harpsichord
Walcha, Helmut	June 1960 – March 1961	Hamburg	EMI 4 89166 ADD	harpsichord
Malcolm, George	1963	UK	L'Oiseau Lyre	Thomas Goff harpsichord
Demus, Jörg	June 1963	Vienna	Westminster WMS 1004, stereo	piano, 54 minutes
Leonhardt, Gustav	1965		Teldec (Das Alte Werk)	harpsichord
Serkin, Peter	March 1965	New York City	RCA (the first of 5 recordings by this artist when he was 17)	piano
Yudina, Maria	January 1968	Moscow	Philips 456 994-2 "Great pianists of the century"	piano
Kempff, Wilhelm	July 1969		Deutsche Grammophon 439 978-2 ADD	piano
Rosen, Charles	July 1969		Sony SBK 48173 ADD	piano
Richter, Karl	1970		Archiv Produktion POCA-9085	harpsichord
Newman, Anthony	1971		Columbia M 30538	harpsichord
Spiegelman, Joel	May 1973		East-West, ISI Productions, Atlantic New Age Bach: The Goldberg Variations ADD	"Kurzweil 250 Digital Synthesizer"
Demus, Jörg	1974		Nuova Era	piano, 74 minutes
Johannesen, Grant	c. 1975		Golden Crest 4167	piano
Kipnis, Igor	1976	New York City	EMI / Angel	harpsichord
Leonhardt, Gustav	August 1976	Haarlem	Deutsche Harmonia Mundi GD77149 ADD (his third and last recording)	harpsichord
Curtis, Alan	September 23, 1976	location unknown	EMI 7630622	1728 Christian Zell harpsichord
Scheurich, Marga	1977		LP Saphir Intercord INT 120.886	Cembalo, harpsichord
Nikolayeva, Tatiana	1979	Moscow	Melodiya C10-13091 (2LP), Relief CR861006 (1CD), Victor VICC40126/7 (2CD). Nikolayeva's 1st recording.	piano
Tureck, Rosalyn	1979 or 1984	Most probably Hamburg	DG, Reissue 1988 1 CD VAI Audio	piano
Pinnock, Trevor	1980		Archiv Produktion 415 130-2 ADD	harpsichord
Weissenberg, Alexis	1981		EMI 5 74952 2	piano
Gould, Glenn	April/May 1981	New York City	originally CBS Masterworks MK 37779, now Sony Classical 52619 DDD (his second and last studio recording of the Goldbergs)	piano (Yamaha CF II), No repeats.
Serkin, Peter	30 January 1982	Freiburg, Germany (live)	SWF 75/76 (the second of his recordings of the work)	piano
Sokolov, Grigory	27 February 1982	Leningrad (live)	Melodiya	piano
Schiff, András	1983		Decca 417 116-2 (1 CD)	All repeats
Nikolayeva, Tatiana	April 1983	Aarhus, Denmark	Classico Classcd 416 (1CD). Nikolayeva's 2nd recording.	piano
Ross, Scott	April 1985	live at Tabaret Hall, University of Ottawa	Erato / Fonovox	harpsichord
Pi-hsien, Chen	October 1985	Festeburgkirche, Frankfurt	Naxos 8.550078 DDD	piano
Serkin, Peter	12–15 March 1986	Saint Paul, Minnesota (live)	ProArte CDD-331 (the third of his recordings of the work)	piano
Gilbert, Kenneth	April 1986	Mas de Vert, Arles	1 CD Harmonia Mundi	harpsichord
Tipo, Maria	26–28 June 1986	Paris	EMI HMV 5 86666 DDD	piano
Nikolayeva, Tatiana	10 November 1986	St. John’s, Smith Square, London	BBC 6483445 (1CD). Nikolayeva's 3rd recording.	piano
Nikolayeva, Tatiana	9 September 1987	Berwald Hall, Stockholm	Bluebell ABCD043 (1CD). Nikolayeva's 4th recording.	piano
Lazko, Igor	c.1987		Belgrade Broadcasting, PGP 2330172	piano
Guillou, Jean	November 1987	Eglise Notre-Dame des Neiges, Alpe d'Huez, France	Dorian 90110	organ
Hussong, Stefan	1987/1988		Thorofon DDD	chromatic button accordion
Ross, Scott	January 1988	Salle Blanqui, Paris	EMI / Virgin Veritas	harpsichord
Koopman, Ton	1988		ERATO 45326-2 DDD	harpsichord
Jarrett, Keith	January 1989		ECM Records 839 622-2 DDD; J.S. Bach: Goldberg Variations	harpsichord
Kawalla, Bronisława	February 1989		Polskie Nagrania PNCD 055 DDD	piano
Vartolo, Sergio	June 1989			Tactus harpsichord
Barenboim, Daniel	October 12, 1989	Live recording, Teatro Colón, Buenos Aires	Erato ER2-45468	piano
Asperen, Bob van	July 1991	Berlin	EMI 7 54209 DDD	harpsichord
Schie, Tjako van	February 1991	Netherlands	Rondo 001 DDD	piano
Jaccottet, Christiane	1991		Pilz 160127	harpsichord, no repeats
Black, Virginia	1991		Collins 70032-2 (2 CDs)	harpsichord, all repeats
Cole, Maggie	1991		Virgin 5 61555 (2 CDs) DDD	harpsichord
Feltsman, Vladimir	October 26, 1991	live at the Moscow Conservatory	Musical Heritage Society 513260T DDD	piano, all repeats
Nikolayeva, Tatiana	January 23, 1992	Rosslyn Hill Unitarian Chapel, Hampstead, London	Hyperion Records CDA66589. Nikolayeva's 5th recording.	piano
Hantaï, Pierre	June 1992		Opus 111 OPS 30–84 DDD (the first of his two recordings)	harpsichord
Verlet, Blandine	September 1992	L'Eglise de Saint Hippolyte (Tarn), France	Astrée Auvidis E 8745 (her second recording of this work). Re-released on Naïve, 2012	1751 Hemsch harpsichord
Canino, Bruno	January 16–17, 1993	Lugano	Ermitage ERM 412-2 DDD	piano
Lauriala, Risto	September 13–14, 1993		ALBA ABCD103	piano
Gavrilov, Andrei	1993		Deutsche Grammophon 435 436-2 DDD	piano
New European Strings Chamber Orchestra	October 1993	Hamburg	Nonesuch, transcription by Dmitry Sitkovetsky	orchestra
Bühler-Kestler, Eleanore	October 1993	Bayreuth	CHARADE; CHA 3012 DDD	harpsichord
Kumamoto, Mari	December 1, 1993		King Records (Japan) KICC-110	piano
Serkin, Peter	June 1–3, 1994	New York City	BMG Classics 09026 68188 2 DDD (the fourth of his recordings of the work)	piano
Lifschitz, Konstantin	June 10–13, 1994		Denon Records #78961 DDD (Lifschitz was 17 at time of recording.)	piano
Rousset, Christophe	September 27–29, 1994		originally L'Oiseau-Lyre, now Decca 475 7080 DDD	harpsichord, all repeats
Dershavina, Ekaterina	1994		Arte Nova Catalog #: 340110	piano, all repeats except Aria da capo
Schepkin, Sergey	January 15, 1995		Ongaku Records 024-107 DDD	piano, all repeats
Cooper, Kenneth (harpsichordist)	1995		Berkshire Bach Society	harpsichord
Bartos, Samuel	1995		Connoisseur Society	piano
Aldwell, Edward	1996		Biddulph flw001 DDD	piano
Rodarmer, Kurt	1996		Sony SK 60257 DDD	two guitars (overdubbed)
Sutherland, Robin	1996		d'Note Classics DND 1013- ADD	piano, all repeats
Suzuki, Masaaki	February, June and July 1997		BIS BIS-CD-310819 DDD	harpsichord All repeats
Eötvös, József	1997		EJ-01WZ DDD	solo guitar
Mašek, Michal	1997		LT 0056-2 131	piano
Katz, Shelley	18–19 November 1997	Snape Maltings Concert Hall	Private Label – Produced by Erik Smith with fewer than 30 edits to the entire master	piano, all repeats except for minor variations
Ivo Janssen	Februari 1998		Void	piano
Tureck, Rosalyn	March 1998	Hamburg	2 CD DG (the seventh and last recording of the Goldbergs by this artist)	piano
Vieru, Andrei	1998		Harmonia Mundi 901666	piano
Bezuijen, Abram	1998		VLS Records VLC 0598	organ
Zhu, Xiao-Mei	1999		Mandala Records DDD	piano
Canadian Brass	1999		RCA Red Seal DDD (Echo Award 2002)	brass quintet
Martin Beaver, David Harding, and Bryan Epperson	1999	CBC Studios, Toronto, Ontario	CBC Musica Viva MVCD 1130	string trio
Koroliov, Evgeni	1999	Festeburgkirche, Frankfurt am Main, Germany	Hänssler	piano
Belder, Pieter-Jan	20 April, 8/9 July 1999		Brilliant Classics 92284 DDD	harpsichord
Hewitt, Angela	28 August-1 September 1999	Henry Wood Hall, London	Hyperion Records CDA 67305	piano
Schirmer, Ragna	June 1999	Johanniterkirche, Groß Eichsen, Germany	Berlin Classics 001716 DDD	piano
Les Violons du Roy	September 1999	Saint-Irénée, Québec, Canada	1 CD Dorian	transcription for string orchestra
Amati String Trio	December 1999	Middelburg Synagogue, The Netherlands	Columns Classics 99564 DDD	string
Perahia, Murray	July 2000		Sony Classical SK/SM 89243 DDD	piano (Steinway D-274)
Okonar, Mehmet	2000		LMO-Records UTC 8697408800030 DDD	piano
Kłosiewicz, Władysław	2000		Accord ACD 081-2	harpsichord
Canadian Brass	2000		RCA 63610	horn, trumpet, trombone, tuba
Jacques Loussier Trio	2000		Telarc CD-83479 DDD	jazz trio
Caine, Uri	2000	Recorded in New York, Italy and Germany October 1999 – January 2000	Winter & Winter 910 054 The Goldberg Variations	rock, dub, electro, jazz, ragtime, blues, avant-garde, valse, Christmas music, soul, tango, mambo, gospel, bebop, experimental, drum & bass, samba, klezmer, bossa nova, etc.
Toth, Gwendolyn	2000		Zefiro Recordings ZR 103 (2 CDs)	lute harpsichord
Frisch, Celine	2001		Alpha 14 (2 CDs) with BWV 1087	harpsichord
Degazio, Bruno	2001			electronic wind instrument
Vinikour, Jory	2001	San Raphael, CA	Delos Records	harpsichord All repeats
Dimetrik, Wolfgang	2001		Amphion records 20126 DDD	accordion
Schlimé, Francesco Tristano	2001		Accord ACD 098 with BWV 622	piano
Bahrami, Ramin	February 2002	La Chaux-de-Fonds (CH)	Decca 476 282 DDD	piano
Schiff, András	October 2002	Basel	ECM DDD (his second recording; made live in concert)	piano
Haugsand, Ketil	2002		Simax PSC 1192	harpsichord
Bjørkøe, Christina	2002	Scandinavian Classics 220590 -205 DDD	piano	
Banton, Hugh	2002	The Organ Workshop, Lymm, Cheshire and aboard 'NB Tocata' on the Bridgewater Canal	FIE 9128	Organ
Crossland, Jill	2003		Apex (Warner Classics) 0927 49979 2 DDD	piano
Hantaï, Pierre	2003		Mirare MIR 9945 DDD (his second recording)	harpsichord
Stadtfeld, Martin	March 2004		Sony BMG SK93101 DDD	piano
Väyrynen, Mika	2004		ALBA ABCD 191	accordion
Ennis, Catherine	2004		Mollterz	organ
Ogeil, Jacqueline	2004		ABC Classics – Discovery 476 3529	harpsichord
Trio Zilliacus Persson Raitinen	2004		Caprice CAP-21695	string trio
Jandó, Jenő	2005		Naxos 8.557268 DDD	piano
Martins, João Carlos	2005		Tomato 2126	piano
Gaede Trio	2005		Tacet 070CD (2 CD) DDD	string trio
Tůma, Jaroslav	2005		Arta F101362 (2 CD)	harpsichord, clavichords
Egarr, Richard	8–11 March 2005		Harmonia Mundi HMU 907425.26, with BWV 1087 DDD	harpsichord
Cheung, Pius	2006		MPC	marimba
Beausejour, Luc	2006		Analekta	harpsichord
Gould, Glenn (with Zenph Re-Performance)	May 2007	Glenn Gould Studio, Toronto	Sony Classics, 88697-03350-2	piano
Barshai, Elena	Autumm 2007		Brilliant Classics	organ
Dinnerstein, Simone	2007		Telarc CD-80692 DDD	piano
Levin, Beth	April 28, 2007	Steinway Hall, New York City	Centaur Records, Inc. CRC 2927 DDD	piano
Schliessmann, Burkard	July 17–19, 2007	Teldex Studios Berlin	BAYER 100 326 (Qualiton)	piano
MacGregor, Joanna	September 30 – October 1, 2007	Mozarteum concert hall, Salzburg, Austria	Warner Classics 2564-68393	piano
Blassel, Sylvain	2008		Lontano (Warner Classics) 2568 69199-6 DDD	harp
Finch, Catrin	2008		Deutsche Grammophon 477 8097 DDD	harp
Korevaar, David	2008		Ivory Classics 77005	piano
Crawford, Lisa Goode	2008		Centaur CRC 2899 DDD	harpsichord
Lim, Dong-Hyek	2008		EMI	piano
Schepkin, Sergey	July 22, 2008	Jordan Hall, Boston	King International, Inc., Tokyo, Japan KKC 29 DDD; Schepkin's second recording of this work	piano
Staier, Andreas	2009	Berlin	Harmonia mundi HMU 902058	harpsichord
Cload, Julia	2009	London	Meridian	piano
Nyírő, Sebestyén	Dec. 6, 2007, Published 2009	Basel	MHMC Budapest	piano
Bacchetti, Andrea	2010	Sacile (PN), Italy	Dynamic CDS-659	piano
Erez, Tzvi	2010	Toronto, Canada	Niv Classical	piano
Arad, Avner	2010	New York City	MSR Classics MS-1167	piano
Devine, Steven	2010	Suffolk, England	Chandos 0780	harpsichord
Angelich, Nicholas	2010		Virgin Classics	piano
Bloss, Nick van	2010	Henry Wood Hall, London	Nimbus Records	piano
Shemer, David	2011	Christ Church, Jerusalem	Aria	harpsichord
Fretwork	2011	[?]	HMU907560	viol consort
Sohn, Minsoo	2011	The Banff Centre, Alberta	Honens 21794	piano
Jalbert, David	2011	Palais Montcalm, Québec City	ATMA	piano
Gurning, Alexander	2011	Flagey Studio 1, Brussels	Avanti	piano
Tepfer, Dan	2011		Sunnyside	jazz piano
Tsalka, Michael	December 1 & 2, 2012	Roxy Studio, Berlin, Germany	paladino music	clavichords
Worms, Marcel	2012	Zeeuwse Concertzaal Middelburg, Netherlands	Zefir	piano
Perrotta, Maria	2012	Teatro Rossini, Lugo, Emilia Romagna	Decca	piano
Crochet, Évelyne	2012	DiMenna Center, New York City	Elite Recordings	piano (Steinway)
Douglass-Ishizaka, Kimiko	2012	Teldex Studio, Berlin	Open Goldberg Variations	piano (Bösendorfer 290 Imperial)
Garnati Ensemble	2012	Auditorio del C.C.R. Fray Luis De Leon, Guadarrama (Madrid)	Sony Music 88725474372	arranged for string trio by Yuval Gotlibovich
Magalhães, Luís and Schumann, Nina	2012	Endler Hall, Stellenbosch University, South Africa	Two Pianists	arrangement for two pianos by Rheinberger/Reger
Costin, Robert	Dec. 2012	The Chapel of Pembroke College, Cambridge	Stone Records	organ
Denk, Jeremy	Jan. 2013	Recital Hall of the Performing Arts Center, Purchase College, State University of New York	Nonesuch Records	piano (Steinway)
Duo Melisande	2013	Toulouse	Paraty	transcribed by Benedetto Montebello for 2 guitars, modified by the performers
Kawamura, Sachiko	2013	St. Bartholomew's, Brighton	Claudio	piano
Zhu, Xiao-Mei	2014	St. Thomas Church, Leipzig	Accentus	piano (video DVD)
Vogt, Lars	March 2014	Deutschlandfunk Kammermusiksaal, Köln, Germany	Ondine ODE 1273-2	piano
Dahl, Carsten	2014 (recorded over 10 years)	Kæv Studio, Copenhagen	Tiger Music 1902350 Tiger Music 1902138	prepared piano
Villalba, Miquel	2014	Girona Auditori, Spain	Aglae Musica	piano
Dubreil, Pascal	2014	Église de Notre-Dame de l'Assomption, Basse-Bodeux	Ramée RAM-1404	harpsichord
Hewitt, Angela	2015	Christuskirche, Firlstraße, Berlin-Oberschöneweide	Hyperion	piano (second recording)
Tharaud, Alexander	2015	Aix en Provence – conservatoire Darius Milhaud	Erato	piano
Sims, Lori	2015	Dalton Center Recital Hall, Western Michigan University, Kalamazoo, MI	Two Pianists	piano
Levit, Igor	2015	Funkhaus Nalepastrasse, Berlin	Sony	piano
Muller, Jean	2015	Conservatoire de la ville de Luxembourg	Hanssler HC17059	piano
Torres, Xavier	2016	Palau de la Música, Valencia, Spain	IBS Classical	piano (Steinway D)
Camerata RCO	2016		BarcaNova	string trio
Esfahani, Mahan	2016	Berlin	Deutsche Grammophon GmbH	harpsichord
Lester, Richard	2016		Nimbus NI5946	harpsichord
Schornsheim, Christine	2016		Capriccio C5286	harpsichord
Rana, Beatrice	2016 (7–9 Nov.), released Feb. 2017	Teldex Studio, Berlin	Warner Classics – Parlophone 0190295880187	piano
Mazzocchin, Giovanni	2016	Saletta acustica 'Eric James', Pove del Grappa	OnClassical OC17042B	piano
De Maria, Pietro	2016		Decca	piano
Yilmaz, Kemal Cem	2016		Audite	piano
La Compagnie Pochette	2016		Alba	string trio
Belder, Pieter-Jan	2017		Brilliant Classics 95471BR	harpsichord
Kamerkoor PA'Dam	2017		Cobra	Re-composition for choir & baroque ensemble by Gustavo Trujillo
Concerto Italiano, Rinaldo Alessandrini	2017		Naive	period strings and continuo
Martin Heini	2017	St. Katharina Parish Church, Horw, Switzerland	Guild	organ
Serkin, Peter	12 November 2017	St. Paul, Minnesota (live)	Vivace VTV-8808 (the fifth and last of his recordings of the work)	piano
Ji (Ji-Yong)	2018		Warner Classics	piano
Rainwater, Anne	December 14, 2018	Oakland, California		piano
Lang Lang	September 2020	Live recording at Thomaskirche, Leipzig	Deutsche Grammophon	piano, all repeats observed (simultaneous studio & live recordings)
Kolesnikov, Pavel	rel. Nov 2020 rec. Dec 2019	London	Hyperion	piano
Mazzocchin, Giovanni	2021	Saletta acustica 'Eric James', Pove del Grappa	OnClassical OC21116B	piano
Rondeau, Jean	April 2021	Paris	Erato 9029650811	harpsichord, all repeats
Ólafsson, Víkingur	October 2023	Reykjavík	Deutsche Grammophon 00028948645534	piano
MacDonald, Sarah	May 2024	Ely Cathedral, United Kingdom	Regent Records REGCD568	piano
Lim, Yunchan	April 25, 2025, Released Feb. 6, 2026	Carnegie Hall, New York City	Deutsche Grammophon 518975000	piano
TrioFenix	rel. Feb 2026 rec. Feb 2025	Concertgebouw Bruges, Belgium	Evil Penguin Classic	string trio (Arr. Dmitry Sitkovetsky)

Without recording date – To be inserted in the list

- Ito Ema – MA Recordings M024A – digitally recorded February 1994
- Zuzana Růžičková – Erato – ERA 9034 – Neupert (Mercier-Ythier) harpsichord
