= Nick van Bloss =

British classical musician (born 1967)

Nick van Bloss (born 1967) is an English classical pianist and author who has Tourette syndrome. He studied at the Royal College of Music in London.

== Early life ==
Van Bloss was born and grew up in London and, at the age of seven, suddenly developed severe motor and vocal tics. Far from being a "passing phase" the tics did not subside, but rather became more aggressive. He was taken from doctor to doctor in hopes of an explanation for his uncontrollable movements, but the medical profession failed to find any medical explanation. It was suggested that his behaviour was "attention seeking".

Van Bloss found school life a harrowing experience as he entered secondary school in London, where he was bullied and mimicked for having explosive tics; his life became a misery. He also faced a difficult situation at home: his brother was a heroin addict who committed suicide when Nick was 15. During this time, he never felt he could confide in his parents, telling them how the bullying terrified him, because he felt that their dealing with his brother's heroin problem was already a trial great enough for them.

== Music and piano ==
Van Bloss began piano lessons at the relatively late age of eleven. Although his brother had been a budding pianist, van Bloss himself had never felt drawn to the piano; moreover, his parents had got rid of the family piano when his brother began his drug habit. However, once he began his study of the instrument, van Bloss took to it and progressed quickly. He entered the Royal College of Music in London at the age of fifteen to study as a Junior and then, at seventeen, to attend full-time.

At the college, van Bloss excelled, but was held back by his tics and his condition, which still was undiagnosed. He studied with Yonty Solomon and won numerous prizes. He tooke further lessons from Benjamin Kaplan. In a master-class held at the Royal College of Music in 1987, the Russian pianist Tatiana Nikolayeva described van Bloss as "already a pianist". However, his relationship with the college was unhappy. He was in constant conflict with College authorities, who, he felt, appreciated neither his talent nor the difficulties that accompanied living under his condition.

== Diagnosis ==
After years of enduring a condition for which he had no name, Nick was finally correctly diagnosed with Tourette syndrome when he was twenty-one. Although Nick felt jubilant in finally having a name for his condition (after a fourteen-year wait), he was resentful that the medical profession had not detected the tell-tale signs of Tourette syndrome.

== Career ==
Nick van Bloss played recitals, concertos and chamber music in the UK and around Europe for a number of years before "retiring" from public performance because of his Tourette syndrome. Up until that point, he had remained "tic-free" whenever he played the piano. He claimed that playing the piano was the only solace he was ever granted from a body that never stopped moving. However, in a major international piano competition, he eliminated himself from the competition in mid-performance when, for the first time in his life while playing, he had severe tics throughout his body.

After 15 years of 'retirement' from professional and public life, van Bloss made a comeback concert on 28 April 2009 at London's Cadogan Hall playing a concerto by Bach and the Emperor Concerto by Beethoven with the English Chamber Orchestra This concert received enormous media attention and was described as a 'triumph' by London critics.

In January 2010, van Bloss released a recording of the Goldberg Variations by Bach by Nimbus Records which received widespread acclaim from critics

Van Bloss's recording of five Keyboard Concertos by Bach with the English Chamber Orchestra was released in 2011 by Nimbus Records as NI 6141. It was followed in 2013 by a Chopin disc containing the Sonata in B minor, Op 58 and the 24 Preludes Op 28 (NI 6215) and in 2015 by a Beethoven CD containing the Diabelli Variations Op 120 and the Sonata in F minor, Op 57 Appassionata (NI 6276). In the booklet issued with the last-mentioned CD (page 11) a further recording of music by Schumann, Kreisleriana and the Etudes Symphoniques Op 13, is announced as due for release in November 2015.

== BBC Horizon ==
In April 2007, Nick van Bloss was the focus of a BBC Horizon documentary called Mad but Glad, produced and directed by Nicola Stockley The programme follows van Bloss on a journey of self-discovery, in which he hopes to find the answer to the old question, "Is there such a thing as the mad genius?" In particular, van Bloss seeks to find whether his talent for the piano might have in some way been caused or enhanced by his Tourette's. Van Bloss meets many other "afflicted" people on his journey, with conditions such as autism, schizophrenia and automatic writing, all of whom show an unusual and unexplained talent in an art form. He also speaks with clinicians about his condition and the musical connection, notably Oliver Sacks. The programme ends with Nicola Stockley asking van Bloss whether, given the severity of his Tourette's, he would ever consider playing in public again.

In 2007, Oliver Sacks wrote about Nick van Bloss in his book Musicophilia: Tales of Music and the Brain. Sacks writes that in conversation with van Bloss about his piano playing and Tourette's, van Bloss speaks in terms of his condition's constituting an "energy", one that is "harnessed and focused" when he plays the piano. In a paradoxical way, Sacks says, Tourette's plays an essential role in Nick's piano playing.

== See also ==
- Matt Savage
- Tony Cicoria
- Goldberg Variations discography
