= Sigalevitch =

Sigalevitch is a surname. Notable people with the surname include:

- Lev Sigalevitch (1921–2004), Russian painter
- Valery Sigalevitch (born 1950), Russian pianist, son of Lev Sigalevitch
- Anna Sigalevitch (born 1986), French actress and pianist
