= Richard Lester (disambiguation) =

Richard Lester is an American film director based in the United Kingdom.

Richard Lester or Dick Lester may also refer to:

- Richard Lester (art patron), patron of The Lester Prize, an Australian art prize
- Richard Lester (harpsichordist), English harpsichordist and musicologist
- Richard Lester (rower), British rower
- Richard K. Lester, American nuclear engineer, educator, and author
- Richard Neville Lester, English botanist and chemotaxonomist
