= Sergey Schepkin =

American pianist of Russian birth (born 1962)

- Born: September 24, 1962 (age 64); St. Petersburg
- Occupations: pianist; music educator
- Awards: Concertino-Praga International Competition for Young Musicians (First Prize); All-Russia Piano Competition (Second Prize); Queen Sonja International Music Competition (Third Prize); New Orleans International Piano Competition (First Prize)
- Musical career
- Genre: Classical
- Years active: 1985 – present
- Labels: Simax; Ongaku; Centaur; Northern Flowers; King International; Arabesque; Steinway & Sons
- Website: schepkin.com

Sergey Schepkin (born September 24, 1962) is an American pianist of Russian birth. He lives in Brookline, Massachusetts.

== Performer ==
Schepkin was born in St. Petersburg. He started playing piano at the age of five under the tutelage of Leah Zelikhman, and studied piano at the St. Petersburg Conservatory with Alexandra Zhukovsky (a pupil of Sergei Tarnowsky), Grigory Sokolov, and Alexander Ikharev, graduating summa cum laude in 1985. He gave his first full-length piano recital in 1978, and made his orchestral debut with the Saint Petersburg Academic Symphony Orchestra under the baton of Vladislav Chernushenko in 1984. After his permanent move to the United States in 1990, he studied with Russell Sherman at New England Conservatory in Boston, where he earned an Artist Diploma in 1992 and a Doctor of Musical Arts degree in 1999. He also coached with Paul Doguereau in 1994–98. He made his Carnegie Hall recital debut in 1993 (at Weill Recital Hall), and has performed as soloist and chamber player throughout the world. He has appeared at the Great Performers Series at Lincoln Center for the Performing Arts, Celebrity Series of Boston, the Metropolitan Museum of Art in New York, Boston's Gardner Museum and Emmanuel Music, Kennedy Center for the Performing Arts and Phillips Collection in Washington, DC, LACMA and Maestro Foundation series in Los Angeles, Sumida Triphony Hall in Tokyo, as well as Grand and Chamber Halls of the St. Petersburg Philharmonia, among many other venues and series. He has performed under the baton of Kazuyoshi Akiyama, Karsten Andersen, Keith Lockhart, Jonathan McPhee, Klauspeter Seibel, and Vassily Sinaisky. His concerts and recordings have been reviewed by The New York Times, The Boston Globe, Los Angeles Times, Asahi Shimbun, BBC Music Magazine, International Piano, Fanfare, American Record Guide, Musicweb-International, and other publications. Sergey Schepkin is a Steinway Artist.

== Educator ==
Schepkin is also active as an educator. He served on the faculty of the St. Petersburg Conservatory in 1988–90 (where he also was Professor Ekaterina Murina's assistant in 1987-89), and was a Visiting Assistant Professor at the University of Iowa in 1997–98. He is a Professor of Piano at Carnegie Mellon University in Pittsburgh, where he has served since 2003; he taught at The Boston Conservatory in 2006-07; in 2011-13, he was appointed as a Visiting Associate Professor at Boston University, and taught at MIT in 2014-16. He has been on the New England Conservatory Preparatory and Continuing Education piano faculty since 1993. He has presented lecture-recitals and master classes at New England Conservatory, UCLA, San Francisco Conservatory, Oberlin Conservatory, MIT, Longy School of Music, Duquesne University, New Orleans Center for Creative Arts, the Norwegian Academy of Music, and other schools.

== Prizes, awards, grants, and nominations ==
- 1978 First Prize, Concertino-Praga International Competition for Young Musicians, Prague
- 1985 Second Prize, All-Russia Piano Competition, Ufa, Russia
- 1987 Best Collaborative Pianist Diploma, Markneukirchen International Instrumental Competition, Markneukirchen, Germany
- 1988 Third Prize, Queen Sonja International Music Competition, Oslo
- 1990 Perot Foundation Grant
- 1992 Theodore Presser Foundation Award
- 1993 Harvard Musical Association Arthur Foote Award
- 1996 Top Five Want List, Fanfare magazine (for the 1995 Bach Goldberg Variations)
- 1996 Samuel Chester Award
- 1997 & 1998, NAIRD Indie Award Nominations (for The Six Keyboard Partitas Vols. 1 & 2)
- 1994 & 1999 Ludwig Vogelstein Foundation Award
- 1994, 1995, & 1999 St. Botolph Club Foundation Grants
- 1999 Gunther Schuller Medal, New England Conservatory
- 1999 First Prize and Chopin Prize, New Orleans International Piano Competition
- 1999 & 2000 Best recordings of year, The Boston Globe (Bach Well-Tempered Clavier I&II)
- 2001 Top choice of a Bach Well-Tempered Clavier I recording, International Piano Magazine
- 2003 Maestro Foundation Grant
- 2009 Steinway Artist as of October
- 2014 WGBH CD of the Week (Bach French Suites)
- 2016 WCRB CD of the Week (Bach Partitas)

== Discography ==
- 1989 Winners of the 1988 Queen Sonja International Music Competition, Oslo. Simax
- 1995 Bach: The Goldberg Variations. Ongaku
- 1996 Bach: The Six Keyboard Partitas, Volume I: Partitas I-IV. Ongaku
- 1997 Bach: The Six Keyboard Partitas, Volume II: Partitas V and VI, Four Duets, Overture in the French Style. Ongaku
- 1999 Bach: The Well-Tempered Clavier I. Ongaku
- 2000 Schnittke: Violin Sonatas Nos. 1 and 2, with Joanna Kurkowicz, violin. Bridge
- 2000 Bach: The Well-Tempered Clavier II. Ongaku
- 2003 Debussy: Preludes I, Images I, Masques, D’un cahier d’esquisses, L’isle joyeuse. Centaur
- 2006 Mussorgsky: Pictures at an Exhibition; Rachmaninoff: Seven Preludes. Northern Flowers
- 2007 Bach: Schepkin plays Bach Volume 1, Capriccio in B-flat, Partita No. 6, The Italian Concerto. Northern Flowers
- 2010 Bach: Goldberg Variations. King International
- 2011 Brahms: Late Piano Works. King International
- 2013 Schumann: Liederkreis (Kerner Lieder; Lenau Lieder and Requiem; Eichendorff Liederkreis), with Darren Chase, baritone. Arabesque
- 2014 Bach: The Six French Suites, Chromatic Fantasia and Fugue, Fantasia and Fugue in A minor, BWV 904. Steinway & Sons
- 2016 Bach: The Six Partitas. Steinway & Sons
