= Tony Cicoria =

American orthopedic surgeon and pianist (born 1952)

- Born: 1952 (age 73–74)
- Medical career
- Profession: Physician
- Sub-specialties: Orthopedics

Antony (or Tony) Cicoria (born 1952), is a man who is famous for having developed an obsession for piano (listening and practicing) after being struck by lightning after having not played since 7 years old and not liking it. He is a doctor specializing in orthopedic medicine, orthopedic surgery, orthotics, prosthetic supplies, and sports medicine. He was profiled in neurologist Oliver Sacks' book Musicophilia: Tales of Music and the Brain (2007).

== Biography ==
Cicoria received his BS in Biology from The Citadel and graduated from the Medical University of South Carolina (MD, PhD) and the University of Virginia Orthopedic Surgery Residency.

Cicoria is a practicing orthopedic surgeon, and is Chief of the Medical Staff and Chief of Orthopedics at Chenango Memorial Hospital, Norwich, New York. He is also Clinical Assistant Professor of Orthopedics at State University of New York Upstate Medical University, in Syracuse.

In 2004, Cicoria got divorced. During that same year, he had a serious motorcycle accident. Within two months he had completely recovered and returned to work.

At one time he lived in Oneonta, New York and has three children who went to college.

== Lightning accident ==
In 1994, when Tony Cicoria was 42 years old, he was struck by lightning near Albany, New York, while standing next to a public telephone. He had just hung up the phone and was about a foot away when a rogue bolt of lightning struck. He recalled seeing his own body on the ground surrounded by a bluish-white light. Cicoria's heart had apparently stopped, but he was resuscitated by a woman (coincidentally an intensive-care-unit nurse), who was waiting to use the telephone.

Cicoria suffered burns to his face and left foot where the electrical charge had entered and exited his body.

Several weeks after the accident Cicoria consulted a neurologist because he was having difficulties with his memory and was feeling sluggish. The neurological exam, including an EEG and an MRI, found nothing unusual. After a few weeks his energy returned and he went back to work. Two weeks later, his memory problems disappeared. His life had apparently returned to normal.

Then Cicoria, over a period of two or three days, became struck with an insatiable desire to listen to piano music. He acquired a piano and started to teach himself to play. His head was flooded with music that seemed to come from nowhere. Although before his accident, he had had no particular interest in music, within three months of being struck by lightning Cicoria spent nearly all his time playing and composing.

== Artistic career ==
Tony Cicoria debuted his first piano composition in Westport, Connecticut, on October 12, 2007.

In 2007, under the direction of Polly van der Linde, who runs an international piano camp for adults and children in Old Bennington, Vermont, Tony has given recitals at the Sonata Adult Piano Camp, in Bennington, Vermont, where he has played Chopin’s Military Polonaise, Op. 40 (in 2002), Chopin’s Fantaisie-Impromptu (in 2003), Brahms’ Rhapsody, Op. 79, No. 2 (in 2005), Chopin's Scherzo in B-flat Minor, Op. 31 (in 2006) and an earlier version of his own composition, Lightning Sonata.

January 29, 2008 marked an important milestone in Cicoria's musical career. He publicly debuted at the Goodrich Theater in Oneonta, New York, presented by the Catskill Conservatory in association with the SUNY at Oneonta. The performance was assisted by a grant from the NYS Council on the Arts. This performance was recorded live by Granada Media UK, BBC One, and German National Television.

Cicoria is also working on several other solo piano pieces, including a 4-hand / 2-piano piece, a symphony based on Brahms' Variation, op. 9, and a concerto.

He is also writing a book detailing the origin of his musical experience.

== Recognition ==
Cicoria has appeared in numerous magazines including, The Week, SuperConsciousness Magazine, and Financial Times.

He has appeared in numerous television presentations including: BBC One's documentary Imagine, Canada’s The Hour, Granada Media's documentary My Strange Brain, WSKG-TV Expressions and the NOVA episode Musical Minds.

== Discography ==
- Notes From an Accidental Pianist and Composer — (2008)

== See also ==
- Matt Savage
- Nick van Bloss
