= Buxtehude House =

Building in Helsingør, Denmark

Coordinates: 56.0354°N 12.6136°E

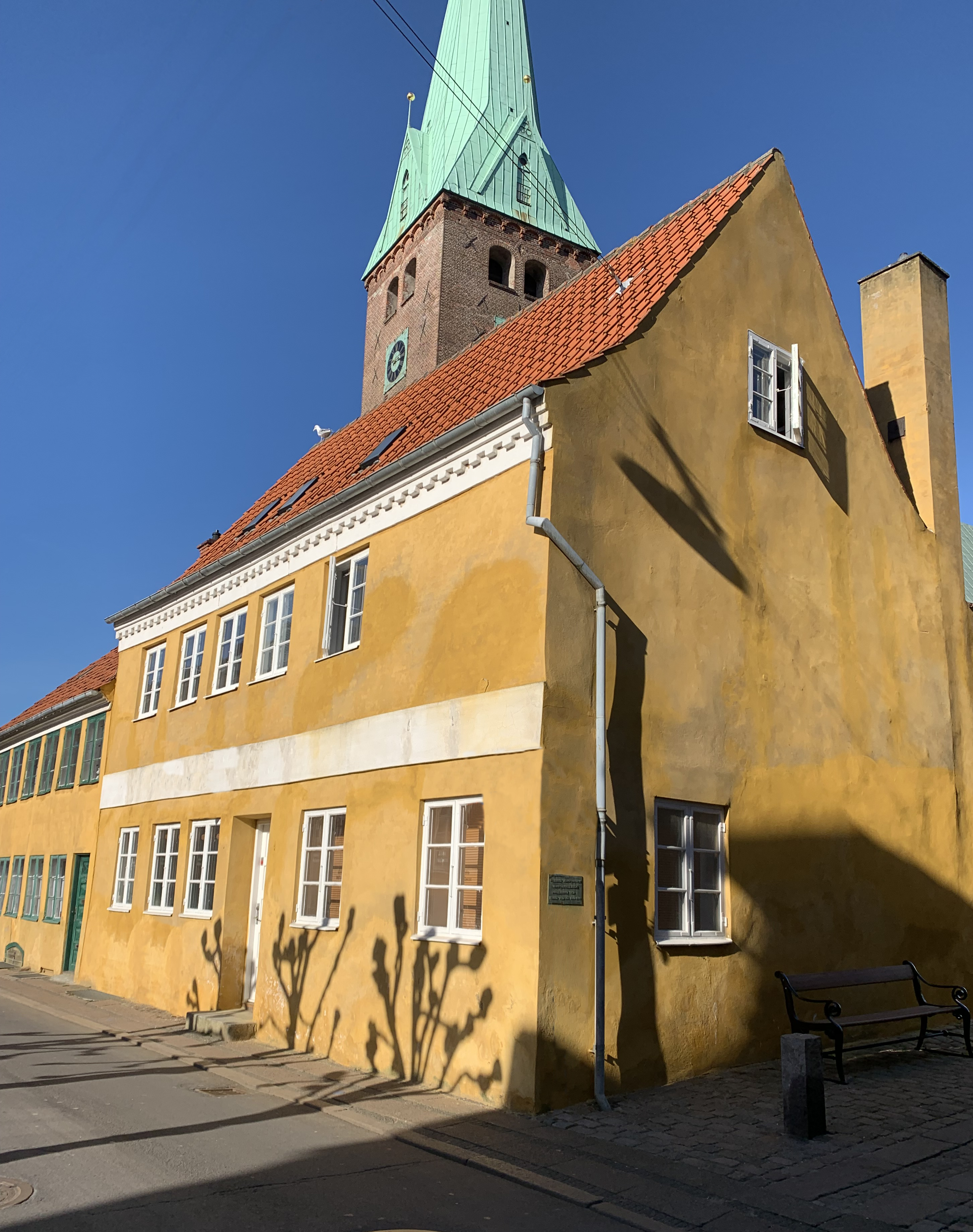
The Buxtehude House seen from the street

The Buxtehude House is a historic property on Sankt Anna Gade in the historic centre of Elsinore, Denmark. It is named after the composer Dieterich Buxtehude who lived in the building.

== History ==
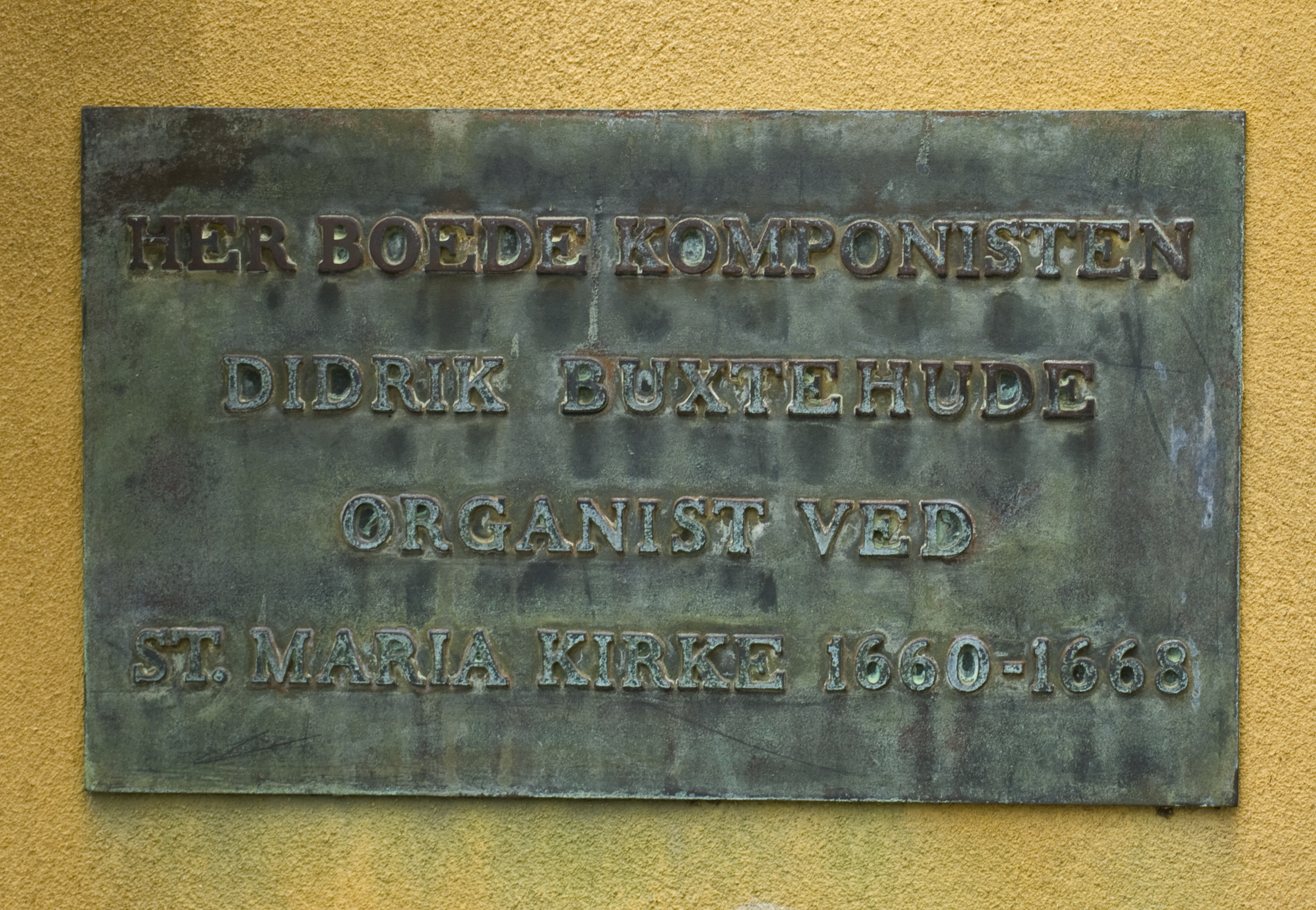
Memorial plaque

Buxtehude lived in the house as a child when it served as residence for the organist at St. Olai's Church, a post held by his father.

After staying for a few years in Helsingborg, on the other side of the Øresund, Dieterich Buxtehude returned to the house, living there again from 1660 to 1668 while serving as organist at St. Mary's Church. He then moved to Lübeck, where he was organist at Marienkirche for the rest of his life.

Later the building on Sankt Anna Gade has served both as a tavern and a butcher's shop and is now a private home.

== Building ==
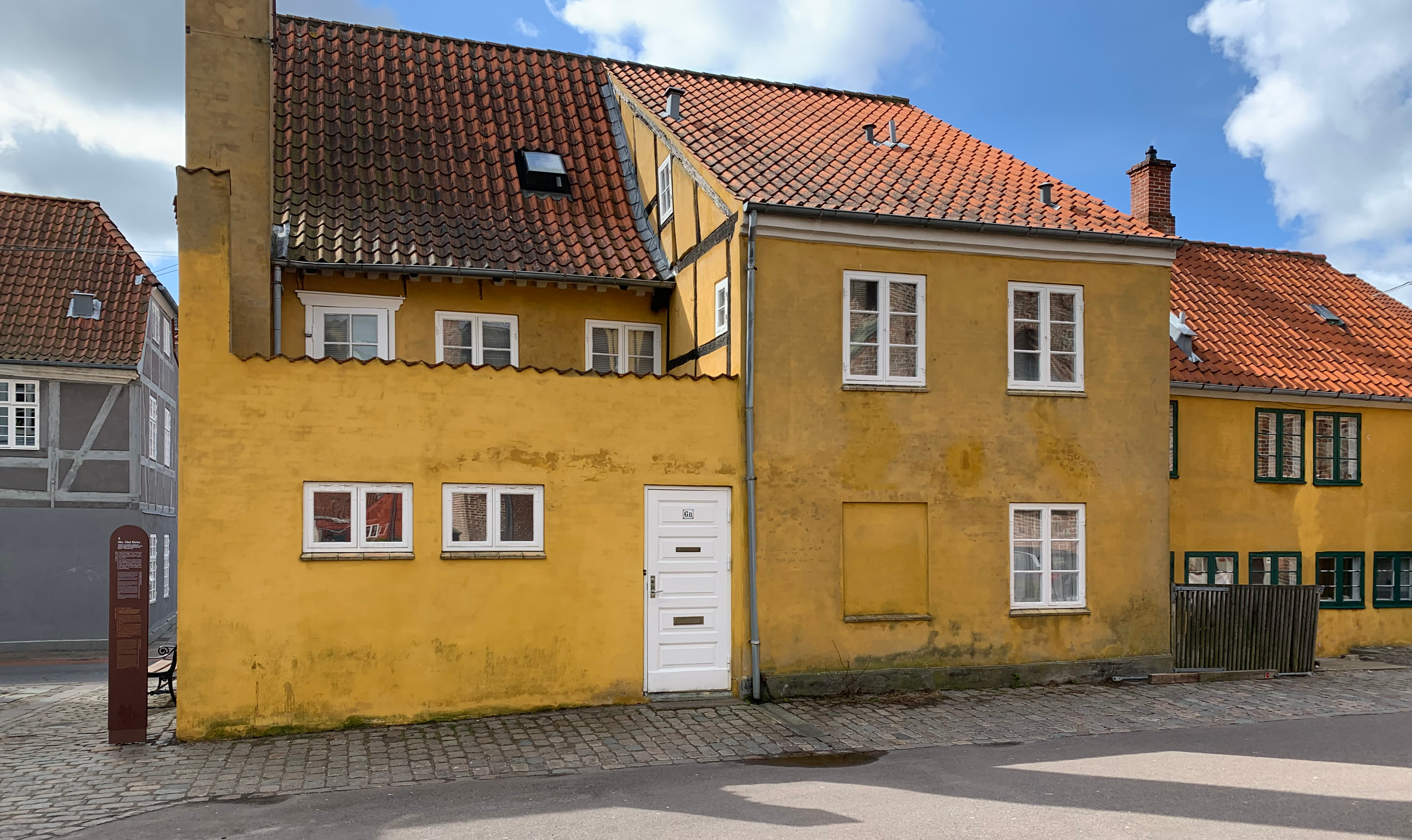
The rear wing

The property consists of a house from c. 1600 facing the street and a rear wing, originally of somewhat older origins but rebuilt in the 19th century. The building was listed by the Danish Heritage Agency in 1950.

There is a plaque conmemorating its eponymous former resident.
