= Simone Stella =

- Born: 1981 (age 44–45); Florence, Italy
- Genres: Classical
- Instruments: harpsichord, organ
- Labels: Brilliant Classics, Amadeus Rainbow, OnClassical, Hymnos Classics
- Website: www.simonestella.com

Simone Stella is an Italian harpsichordist, organist, pianist, composer and producer.

== Recordings ==
- 2009: Georg Friedrich Händel, Suites for harpsichord, book 1, 2 CD, OnClassical (OC33-34B).
- 2011: Dietrich Buxtehude, Complete Harpsichord Music, 4 CD, OnClassical (OC51-54Bv), Brilliant Classics (94312).
- 2012: Dietrich Buxtehude, Complete Organ Music, 6 CD, OnClassical (OC61-66Bv), Brilliant Classics (94422).
- 2013: Georg Böhm, Complete Harpsichord and Organ Music, 4 CD, OnClassical (OC72-75B), Brilliant Classics (94612).
- 2013: Luigi Cherubini, Sei Sonate per cimbalo, un CD, Amadeus Rainbow.
- 2014: Johann Adam Reincken, Complete Harpsichord and Organ Music, 3 CD, OnClassical (OC84-86B), Brilliant Classics (94606).
- 2015: Johann Gottfried Walther, Complete Organ Music, 12 CD, Brilliant Classics (94730).
- 2015: Various Composers: Toccata and Fugue in D minor, BWV 565 & other works, 1 CD, OnClassical (OC95B)
- 2016: Jean-Philippe Rameau: Complete Harpsichord Music, 2 CD, OnClassical (OC130BSET)
- 2016: Johann Jakob Froberger: Complete Music for Harpsichord and Organ, 16 CD, Brilliant Classics (94740)
- 2016: Johann Sebastian Bach: Organ Works BWV 538, 542, 545, 565, 572, 582, 590, 1 CD, OnClassical (OC150B)
- 2018: Federico Maria Sardelli: Suites pour le Clavecin, 1 CD, Brilliant Classics (95488)
- 2019: Johann Pachelbel: Complete Keyboard Music, 13 CD, Brilliant Classics (95623)
- 2021: Friedrich Wilhelm Zachow: Complete Organ Music, 2 CD, Brilliant Classics (96022)
- 2021: Carlo Antonio Campioni: 6 Sonatas for Harpsichord, 1 CD, Brilliant Classics (95997)
- 2021: Giovanni Picchi: Complete Harpsichord Music and other Venetian gems, 1 CD, Brilliant Classics (95998)
- 2025: Dietrich Buxtehude: Trio Sonatas Op. 1 & 2, 2 CD, Brilliant Classics (96288)
- 2025: Johann Sebastian Bach: Preludes, Fughettas and Fugues, 1 CD, Hymnos Classics (00001)
