= Dieterich Buxtehude =

Danish-German organist and composer (1637–1707)

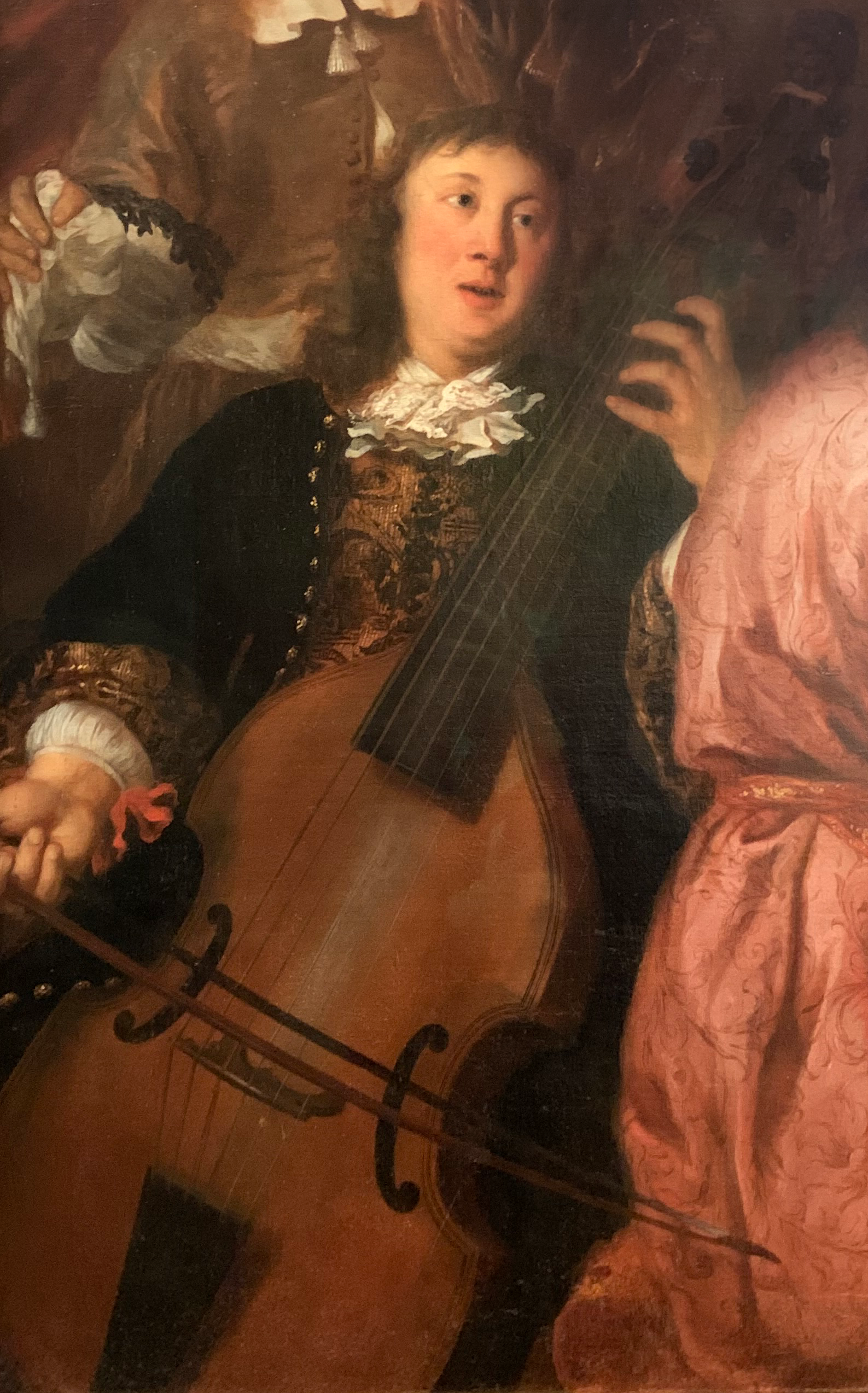
- The only surviving portrait of Buxtehude, playing a viol, from Musical Company by Johannes Voorhout (1674)
- Born: Diderich Hansen Buxtehude; Helsingborg, Scania, Denmark–Norway
- Baptised: c. 1637
- Died: 9 May 1707 (aged 69–70); Free City of Lübeck, Holy Roman Empire
- Occupations: Composer; organist
- Works: List of compositions

Signature
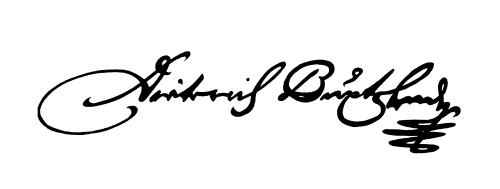

Dieterich Buxtehude (German: [ˈdiːtəʁɪç bʊkstəˈhuːdə]; born Diderich Hansen Buxtehude, Danish: [ˈtiðˀəʁek ˈhænˀsn̩ pukstəˈhuːðə]; c. 1637 – 9 May 1707) was a Danish composer and organist of the middle Baroque era, whose works are typical of the North German organ school. As a composer who worked in various vocal and instrumental idioms, Buxtehude's style greatly influenced other composers, such as Johann Sebastian Bach and George Frideric Handel. Buxtehude is considered one of the most important composers of the 17th century.

== Life ==
=== Early years in Denmark ===
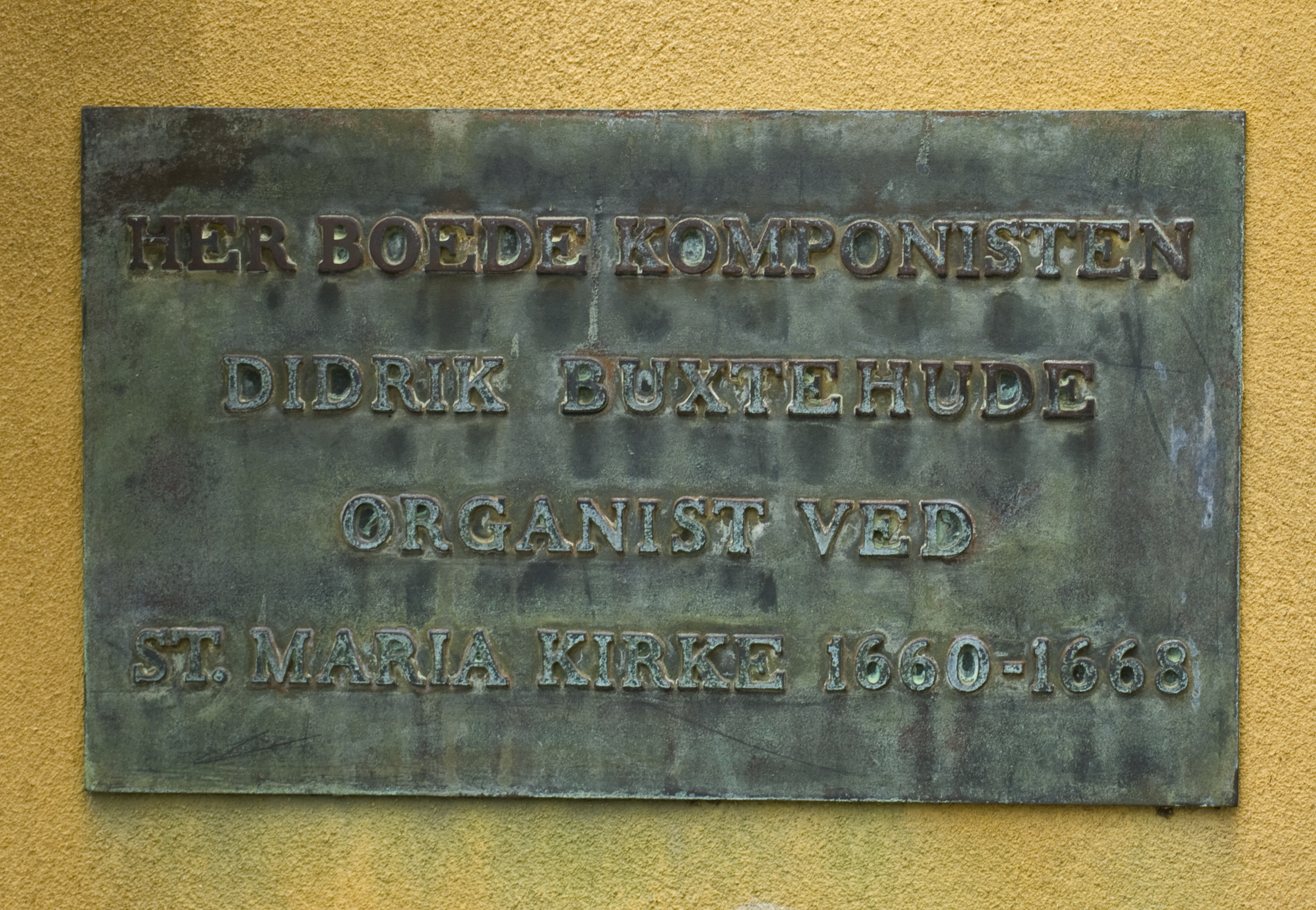
Memorial plaque at Buxtehude House in Helsingør

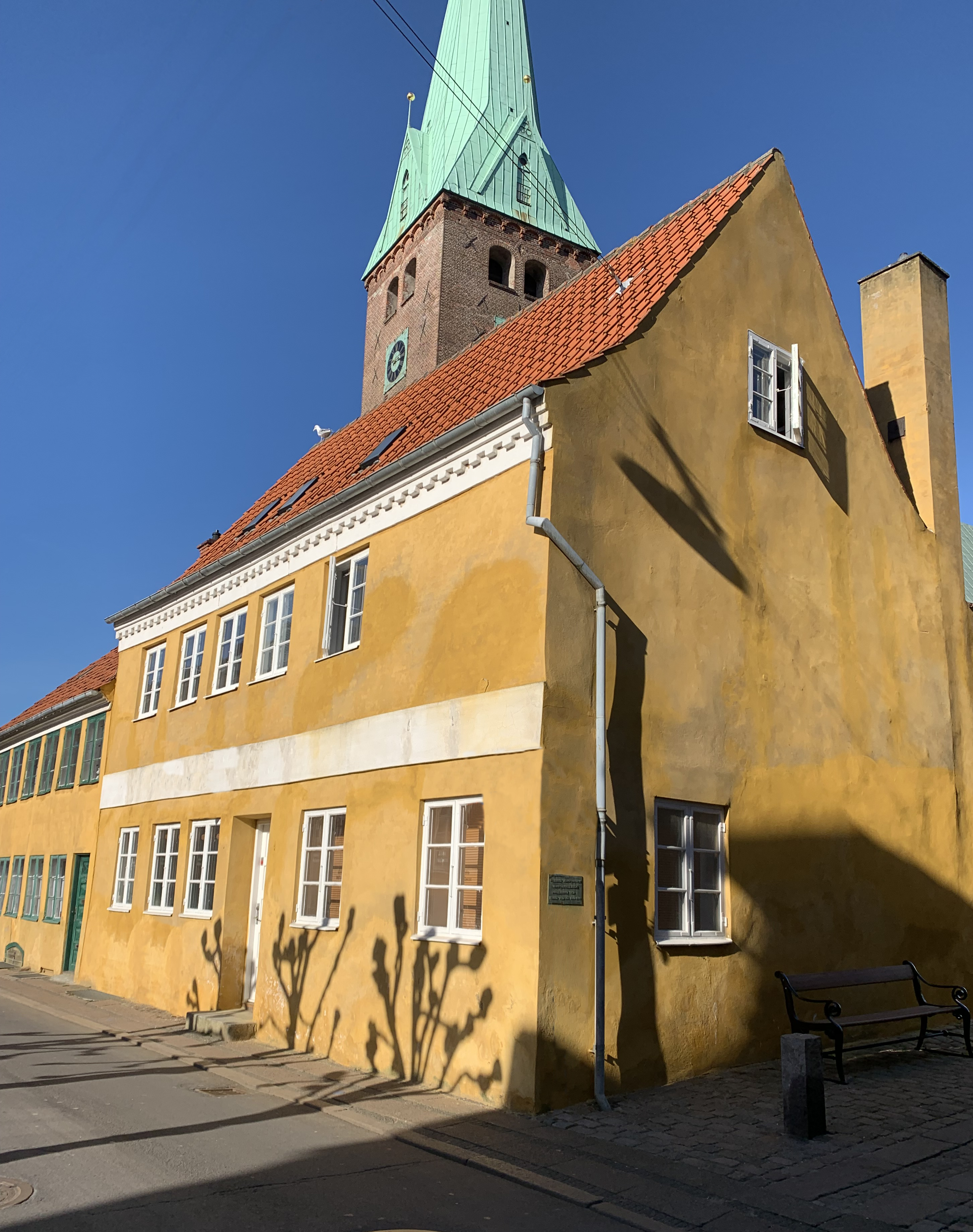
The Buxtehude House. The spire of St. Olaf's is in the background.

He is thought to have been born with the name Diderich Buxtehude. His parents were Johannes (Hans Jensen) Buxtehude and Helle Jespersdatter. His father originated from Oldesloe in the Duchy of Holstein, which at that time was a part of the Danish realms in Northern Germany. Scholars dispute both the year and country of Dieterich's birth, although most now accept that he was born in 1637 in Helsingborg in the province of Scania/Skåne, which was part of Denmark at the time (but it is now part of Sweden). His obituary stated that "he recognized Denmark as his native country, whence he came to our region; he lived about 70 years". Others, however, claim that he was born at Oldesloe. Later in his life he Germanized his name and began signing documents Dieterich Buxtehude.

His father – Johannes Buxtehude – was the organist at St. Olaf's church in Helsingør and of St. Mary's Church in Helsingborg. Dieterich was also employed as an organist, first in Helsingborg (from 1657 until 1658 or 1660) and then at Helsingør (1660–1668). The beginning of his career coincided with the First and Second Dano-Swedish Wars that led to the Swedish conquest of eastern Denmark (Scania, Blekinge and Halland). Consequently, the Buxtehudes found themselves living in Sweden.

It is uncertain whether the war influenced Dieterich's work situation, but in 1660, he accepted a position at St. Mary's in Helsingør in Zealand. This is the only church where Buxtehude was employed that still has the organ in its original location. His father's church organ from St. Mary's Church in Helsingborg that Dieterich also used is now located at Torrlösa Church, and it is also still in use and goes under the name of the "Buxtehude church organ".

=== Lübeck: Marienkirche ===
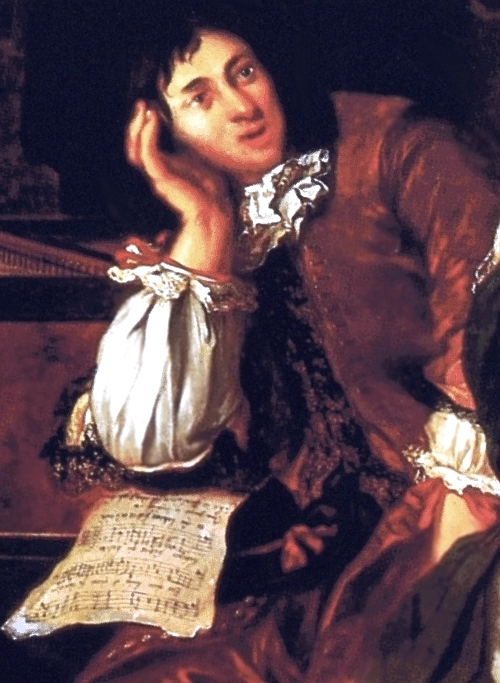
Another person in the same Voorhout painting, once was thought to be Buxtehude. Research reported by Snyder (2007) has questioned this.

Buxtehude's last post, from 1668, was at the Marienkirche, Lübeck which had two organs, a large one for big services and a small one for devotionals and funerals. There he succeeded Franz Tunder and followed in many of the footsteps of his predecessor. He married Tunder's daughter Anna Margarethe in 1668 – it was not uncommon practice that a man marry the daughter of his predecessor in his occupation. Buxtehude and Anna Margarethe had seven daughters who were baptized at the Marienkirche; however, his first daughter died as an infant. After his retirement as organist at St Olaf's Church, his father joined the family in Lübeck in 1673. Johannes died a year later, and Dieterich composed his funeral music. Dieterich's brother Peter, a barber, joined them in 1677.

His post in the free Imperial city of Lübeck afforded him considerable latitude in his musical career, and his autonomy was a model for the careers of later Baroque masters such as George Frideric Handel, Johann Mattheson, Georg Philipp Telemann and Johann Sebastian Bach. In 1673 he reorganized a series of evening musical performances, initiated by Tunder, known as Abendmusik, which attracted musicians from diverse places and remained a feature of the church until 1810. In 1703, Handel and Mattheson both traveled to meet Buxtehude, who was by then elderly and ready to retire. He offered his position in Lübeck to Handel and Mattheson but stipulated that the organist who ascended to it must marry his eldest daughter, Anna Margareta. Both Handel and Mattheson turned the offer down and left the day after their arrival. In 1705, J.S. Bach, then a young man of twenty, walked from Arnstadt to Lübeck, a distance of more than 400 kilometres (250 mi), and stayed nearly three months to hear the Abendmusik, meet the pre-eminent Lübeck organist, hear him play, and, as Bach explained, "to comprehend one thing and another about his art". In addition to his musical duties, Buxtehude, like his predecessor Tunder, served as church treasurer.

=== Influence and legacy ===
Although more than 100 vocal compositions by Buxtehude survive, very few of them were included in the important German manuscript collections of the period, and until the early twentieth century, Buxtehude was regarded primarily as a keyboard composer. His surviving church music is praised for its high musical qualities rather than its progressive elements.

== Works ==
=== General introduction ===
The bulk of Buxtehude's oeuvre consists of vocal music, which covers a wide variety of styles, and organ works, which concentrate mostly on chorale settings and large-scale sectional forms. Chamber music constitutes a minor part of the surviving output, although the only chamber works Buxtehude published during his lifetime were fourteen chamber sonatas. Many of Buxtehude's compositions have been lost. The librettos for his oratorios, for example, survive; but none of the scores do, although his German oratorios seem to be the model for later works by Johann Sebastian Bach and Georg Philipp Telemann. Further evidence of lost works by Buxtehude and his contemporaries can be found in the catalogue of a 1695 music-auction in Lübeck.

Gustaf Düben's collection and the so-called Lübeck tablature A373 are the two most important sources for Buxtehude's vocal music. The former includes several autographs, both in German organ tablature and in score. Both collections were probably created during Buxtehude's lifetime and with his permission. Copies made by various composers are the only extant sources for the organ works: chorale settings are mostly transmitted in copies by Johann Gottfried Walther, while Gottfried Lindemann's and others' copies concentrate on free works. Johann Christoph Bach's manuscript is particularly important, as it includes the three known ostinato works and the famous Prelude and Chaconne in C major, BuxWV 137. Although Buxtehude himself most probably wrote in organ tablature, the majority of the copies are in standard staff notation.

=== Keyboard works ===
==== Preludes and toccatas ====
The nineteen organ praeludia (or preludes) form the core of Buxtehude's work and are ultimately considered his most important contributions to the music literature of the seventeenth century. They are sectional compositions that alternate between free improvisation and strict counterpoint. They are usually either fugues or pieces written in fugal manner; all make heavy use of pedal and are idiomatic to the organ. These preludes, together with pieces by Nicolaus Bruhns, represent the highest point in the evolution of the north German organ prelude, and the so-called stylus phantasticus. They were undoubtedly among the influences of J.S. Bach, whose organ preludes, toccatas and fugues frequently employ similar techniques.

The preludes are quite varied in style and structure, and are therefore hard to categorize, as no two praeludia are alike. The texture of Buxtehude's praeludia can be described as either free or fugal. They consist of strict diatonic harmony and secondary dominants. Structure-wise, there is usually an introductory section, a fugue and a postlude, but this basic scheme is very frequently expanded: both BuxWV 137 and BuxWV 148 include a full-fledged chaconne along with fugal and toccata-like writing in other sections, BuxWV 141 includes two fugues, sections of imitative counterpoint and parts with chordal writing. Buxtehude's praeludia are not circular, nor is there a recapitulation. A fugal theme, when it recurs, does so in a new, changed way. A few pieces are smaller in scope; for example, BuxWV 144, which consists only of a brief improvisatory prelude followed by a longer fugue. The sections may be explicitly separated in the score or flow one into another, with one ending and the other beginning in the same bar. The texture is almost always at least three-voice, with many instances of four-voice polyphony and occasional sections in five voices (BuxWV 150 being one of the notable examples, with a five-voice structure in which two of the voices are taken by the pedal).

The introductory sections are always improvisatory. The preludes begin almost invariably with a single motif in one of the voices which is then treated imitatively for a bar or two. After this the introduction will most commonly elaborate on this motif or a part of it, or on a short melodic germ which is passed from voice to voice in three- or four-voice polyphonic writing, as seen in Example 1:

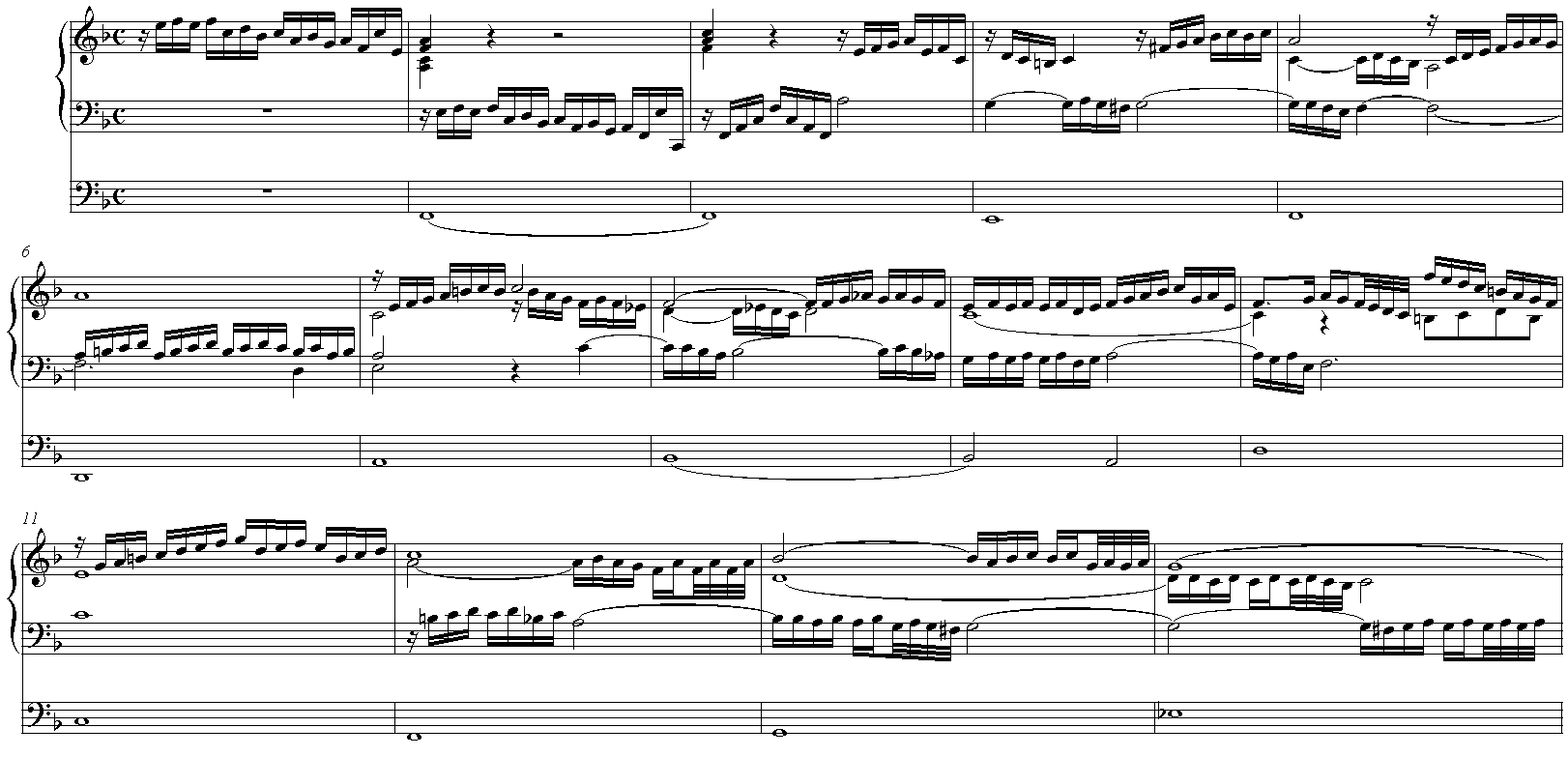
Example 1: This is the introduction from Prelude in F major, BuxWV 145. The motivic interaction seen here, in which a short motif is passing from one voice to another, sometimes sounding in two voices simultaneously, was frequently employed by Buxtehude in his preludes, frequently expanded to four voices with heavy use of pedal.

Occasionally the introduction will engage in parallel 3rds, 6ths, etc. For example, BuxWV 149 begins with a single voice, proceeds to parallel counterpoint for nine bars and then segues into the kind of texture described above. The improvisatory interludes, free sections and postludes may all employ a vast array of techniques, from miscellaneous kinds of imitative writing (the technique discussed above, or "fugues" that dissolve into homophonic writing, etc.) to various forms of non-motivic interaction between voices (arpeggios, chordal style, figuration over pedal point, etc.). Tempo marks are frequently present: Adagio sections written out in chords of whole- and half-notes, Vivace and Allegro imitative sections, and others.

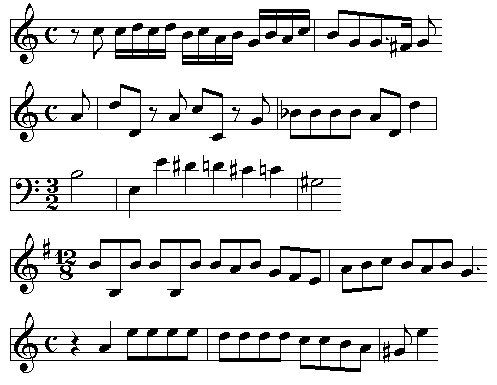
Example 2: Fugue subjects from BuxWV 137, BuxWV 140, BuxWV 142 (two) and BuxWV 153

The number of fugues in a prelude varies from one to three, not counting the pseudo-fugal free sections. The fugues normally employ four voices with extensive use of pedal. Most subjects are of medium length (see Example 2), frequently with some degree of repercussion (note repeating, particularly in BuxWV 148 and BuxWV 153), wide leaps or simplistic runs of 16th notes. One of the notable exceptions is a fugue in BuxWV 145, which features a six-bar subject. The answers are usually tonal, on scale degrees 1 and 5, and there is little real modulation. Stretto and parallel entries may be employed, with particular emphasis on the latter. Short and simple countersubjects appear, and may change their form slightly during the course of the fugue. In terms of structure, Buxtehude's fugues are a series of expositions, with non-thematic material appearing quite rarely, if ever. There is some variation, however, in the way they are constructed: in the first and last fugues of BuxWV 136 the second voice does not state the subject as it enters during the initial exposition; in BuxWV 153 the second exposition uses the subject in its inverted form, etc. Fugue subjects of a particular prelude may be related as in Froberger's and Frescobaldi's ricercars and canzonas (BuxWV 150, 152, etc.):

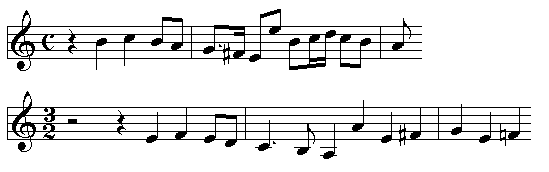

The fugal procedure dissolves at the end of the fugue when it is followed by a free section, as seen in Example 4:

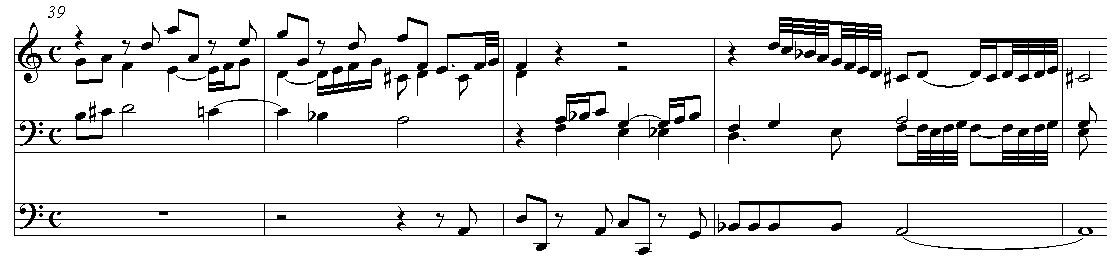
Example 4: The dissolution of the fugue before a free section. The final entry of the subject (in the pedal) is joined by the highest voice engaging in a scale run.

Buxtehude's other pieces that employ free writing or sectional structure include works titled toccata, praeambulum, etc. All are similar to the praeludia in terms of construction and techniques used, except that some of these works do not employ pedal passages or do so in a very basic way (pedal point which lasts during much of the piece, etc.). A well-known piece is BuxWV 146, in the rare key of F-sharp minor; it is believed that this prelude was written by Buxtehude especially for himself and his organ, and that he had his own way of tuning the instrument to allow for the tonality rarely used because of meantone temperament.

==== Chorale settings ====
There are over 40 surviving chorale settings by Buxtehude, and they constitute the most important contributions to the genre in the 17th century. His settings include chorale variations, chorale ricercares, chorale fantasias and chorale preludes. Buxtehude's principal contributions to the organ chorale are his 30 short chorale preludes. The chorale preludes are usually four-part cantus firmus settings of one stanza of the chorale; the melody is presented in an elaborately ornamented version in the upper voice, the three lower parts engage in some form of counterpoint (not necessarily imitative). Most of Buxtehude's chorale settings are in this form. Here is an example from chorale Ein feste Burg ist unser Gott BuxWV 184:

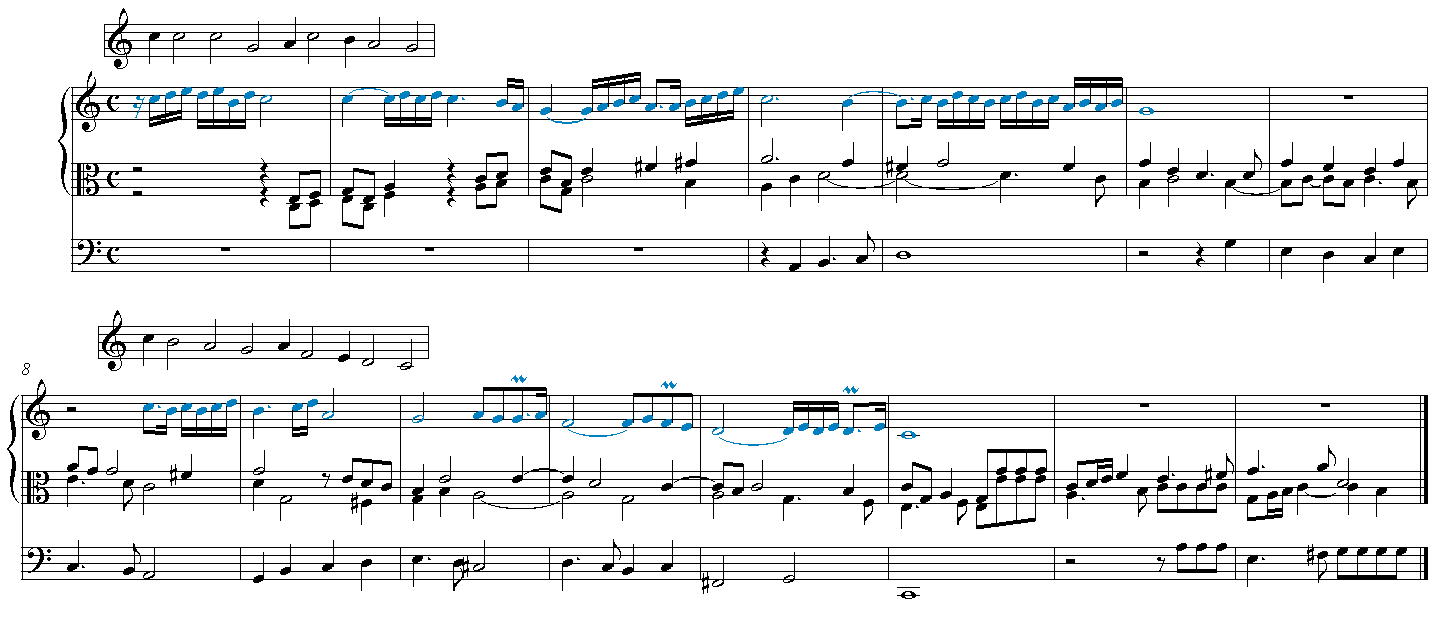
Opening bars of Ein feste Burg ist unser Gott BuxWV 184. The ornamented chorale in the upper voice is highlighted, original melody for the two lines present here is shown on separate staves. Note the basic imitative lines in bars 6–8 and 13–15.

The ornamented cantus firmus in these pieces represents a significant difference between the north German and the south German schools; Johann Pachelbel and his pupils would almost always leave the chorale melody unornamented.

The chorale fantasias (a modern term) are large-scale virtuosic sectional compositions that cover a whole strophe of the text and are somewhat similar to chorale concertos in their treatment of the text: each verse is developed separately, allowing for technically and emotionally contrasting sections within one composition. The presence of contrasting textures makes these pieces reminiscent of Buxtehude's praeludia. Buxtehude was careful with correct word setting, paying particular attention to emphasis and interpretation. Each section is also closely related to the text of the corresponding lines (chromatic sections to express sadness, gigue fugues to express joy, etc.). Examples include fantasias on the [hymn]s Gelobet seist du, Jesu Christ BuxWV 188, Nun freut euch, lieben Christen g'mein BuxWV 210, Nun lob, mein Seel, den Herren BuxWV 213 and Wie schön leuchtet der Morgenstern, BuxWV 223.

Buxtehude's chorale variations are usually in two or three voices. They consist of around 3–4 variations of which only one may use the pedal. These pieces are not as important for the development of the form and not as advanced as Pachelbel's or Böhm's contributions to the genre. There are only a few chorale variations, and there are no distinctive qualities that characterize them.

The pieces that do not fall into any of the three types are the keyboard chorale partita Auf meinen lieben Gott, BuxWV 179, which, quite unusually for its time, is simultaneously a secular suite of dances and a sacred set of variations with a funerary theme; and the ones based on the chant (Magnificats BuxWV 203–5 and Te Deum laudamus, BuxWV 218), which are structurally similar to chorale fantasias.

==== Ostinato works ====
The three ostinato bass works Buxtehude composed—two chaconnes (BuxWV 159–160) and a passacaglia (BuxWV 161)—not only represent, along with Pachelbel's six organ chaconnes, a shift from the traditional chaconne style, but are also the first truly developed north German contributions to the development of the genre. They are among Buxtehude's best-known works and have influenced numerous composers after him, most notably Bach (whose organ passacaglia is modeled after Buxtehude's) and Johannes Brahms. The pieces feature numerous connected sections, with many suspensions, changing meters, and even real modulation (in which the ostinato pattern is transposed into another key).

Some of the praeludia also make use of ostinato models. The praeludium in C major, BuxWV 137, begins with a lengthy pedal solo and concludes not with a postlude of arpeggios and scale runs, but with a comparatively short chaconne built over a three-bar ostinato pattern in the pedal:

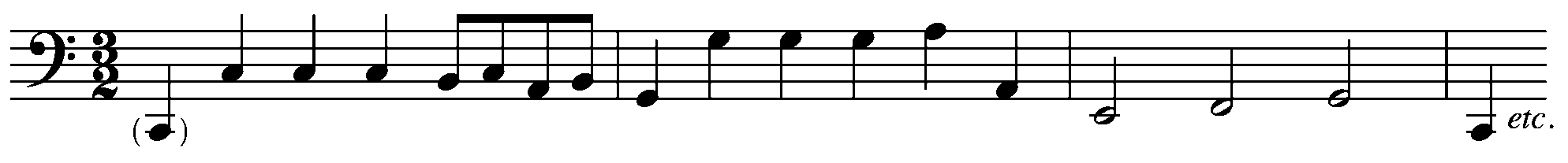

The praeludium in G minor, BuxWV 148, in which the ostinato pattern is derived from the subject of one of the fugal sections, also ends in a chaconne. In addition, another praeludium in G minor, BuxWV 149, employs a repeating bass pattern in the beginning.

==== Other keyboard works ====
The rest of Buxtehude's keyboard music does not employ pedals. Of the organ works, a few keyboard canzonas are the only strictly contrapuntal pieces in Buxtehude's oeuvre and were probably composed with teaching purposes in mind. There are also three pieces labelled fugues: only the first, BuxWV 174, is a real fugue. BuxWV 175 is more of a canzona (two sections, both fugal and on the same subject), while BuxWV 176 is more like a typical Buxtehude prelude, only beginning with a fugue rather than an improvisatory section, and for manuals only.

There are also 19 harpsichord suites and several variation sets. The suites follow the standard model (Allemande – Sarabande – Courante – Gigue), sometimes excluding a movement and sometimes adding a second sarabande or a couple of doubles. Like Froberger's, all dances except the gigues employ the French lute style brisé, sarabandes and courantes frequently being variations on the allemande. The gigues employ basic imitative counterpoint but never go as far as the gigue fugues in the chorale fantasias or the fugal writing seen in organ preludes. It may be that the more developed harpsichord writing by Buxtehude simply did not survive: in his writings, Johann Mattheson mentioned a cycle of seven suites by Buxtehude, depicting the nature of planets, but these pieces are lost.

The several sets of arias with variations are much more developed than the organ chorale variations. BuxWV 250 La Capricciosa may have inspired Bach's Goldberg Variations BWV 988: both have 32 variations (including the two arias of the Goldberg Variations); there are a number of similarities in the structure of individual movements; both include variations in forms of various dances; both are in G major; and Bach was familiar with Buxtehude's work and admired him, as has been related above.

== Recordings ==
=== Available media ===
Was frag ich nach der Welt (BuxWV 104)
Live recording (excerpt)

Variations on an Aria by Lully (Rofilis)
Played with organ (MIDI file).

"Dialogus inter Christum et fidelem animam" – Wo ist doch mein freund geblieben?
A sacred cantata for soprano and bass.

Toccata in F (BuxWV 156)
A toccata for organ.

Cantate Domino (BuxWV 12)
Performed in 2005 by Bangkok Baroque Ensemble and Musica Ficta Bangkok

Ciaconna in E-moll (BuxWV 160)
Performed on organ

- Organ works
  - Lionel Rogg (EMI – 2-CD set; now only available as an mp3 download)
  - Simone Stella (Complete Organ Music – 6-CD set), OnClassical (OC61-66B) 2012 also licensed for Brilliant Classics (BC 94422), 2012
  - Ulrik Spang-Hanssen (complete – recorded 1990/93)
  - René Saorgin (complete)
  - Michel Chapuis (complete)
  - Peter Hurford
  - David Kinsela
  - Harald Vogel (complete – 7 CDs on the MD&G label)
  - Jean-Charles Ablitzer (complete – 5 CDs on the Harmonic Records label – recorded 1987–1989)
  - Ernst-Erich Stender
  - Bine Katrine Bryndorf (complete – 3 CDs & 3 SACDs on the Dacapo label, also available as 6 CDs bundle )
  - Walter Kraft (Complete – six CDs on the VoxBox label cd6x 3613 – recorded 1957, remastered 1999 – Marienkirche, Lübeck)
  - Hans Davidsson (complete organ works – Volume 1: Dieterich Buxtehude and the Mean-Tone Organ, Volume 2: The Bach Perspective, and Volume 3: Dieterich Buxtehude and the Schnitger Organ)
  - Christopher Herrick (to be recorded from 2007)
  - Helga Schauerte-Maubouet : (Complete Organ Works), Syrius (SYR 141.347/348/359/366/371), 2000–2002,
  - Ton Koopman (complete) – Dieterich Buxtehude – Opera Omnia series; Vol III, Organ works 1 (BuxWV 139, 141, 146, 156, 160, 162, 169, 178, 197, 210, 213, 220), Coci/Klapmeyer organ Altenbruch, Antoine Marchand Records, CC72242 – Vol IV, Organ works 2 (BuxWV 157, 161, 163, 164, 170, 173–175, 177, 180–182, 184, 188, 211, 217, 223), Wilde/Schnitger organ Ludingworth, Antoine Marchand Records, CC72243 – Vol VIII, Organ works 3 (BuxWV 149, 179, 225, 140, 185, 159, 148, 187, 176, 145, 183, 213–5, 137, 193, 200), Schnitger organ Hamburg, Antoine Marchand Records, CC72247 – Vol IX, Organ works 4 (BuxWV 138, 199, 172, 202, 224, 147, 196, 171, 219, 203, 144, 212, 201, 167, 186, 198, 190, 207, 189), Gerke/Herbst organ Basedow, Antoine Marchand Records, CC72248 – Vol X, Organ works 5 (BuxWV 142, 209, 218, 136, 222, 155, 221, 151, 152, 191, 158, 204, 205, 150, 153, 194, 192, 143, 206, 208 plus preludes in e (2) and G and a chorale prelude on "Nun komm, der Heiden Heiland" by Nicolaus Bruhns), Bielefeld organ Stade, Antoine Marchand Records, CC72249 (complete)
  - Bernard Foccroulle (complete) Ricercar RIC250. Awarded the Diapason d'Or and the Grand Prix de l'Académie Charles Cros in 2007 in addition to other prizes. On 5 CDs and performed on 5 different organs: Groningen, Martinikerk, Schnitger Organ; Helsingor, Sct. Mariae Kirke, Lorentz-Frietzsch organ; Norden, Ludgeri Kirche, Schnitger Organ; Stockholm, St. Getruds Gemeinde, Gronlunds Organ; Hoogstraten, Sint Katharinakerk, Thomas Organ. Recorded between 2003 and 2006.
  - various organists – Naxos (7 CDs) – Vol 1, Volker Ellenberger, Lutheran City Church, Bueckeburg, Germany, BuxWV 203, 191, 147, 205, 192, 139, 178, 224, 198, 152, 190, 149, 8.554543 – Vol 2 (Julia Brown, Brombaugh organ, Central Lutheran Church, Eugene, Oregon, USA), BuxWV 137, 199, 221, 207, 208, 164, 212, 197, 174, 160, 75, 223, 153, 8.555775 – Vol 3 (Wolfgang Rubsam, Brombaugh organ, Central Lutheran Church, Eugene, Oregon, USA), BuxWV 146, 180, 182, 159, 184, 185, 218, 183, 161, 186, 142, 8.555991 – Vol 4 (Craig Cramer, Fritts organ, Pacific Lutheran University, Tacoma, Washington, USA), BuxWV 140, 208, 200, 193, 171, 141, 177, 181, 168, 143, 189, 211, 217, 169, 202, 187, 155, 8.557195 – Vol 5 (Julia Brown, Pasi organ, St Cecilia Cathedral, Omaha, Nebraska, USA), BuxWV 157, 220, 151, 210, 172, 201, 175, 206, 148, 196, 176, 219, 156, 8.557555 – Vol 6 (Julia Brown, Pasi organ, St Cecilia Cathedral, Omaha, Nebraska, USA), BuxWV 150, 166, 215, 213, 204, 145, 194, 225, 222, 136, 179, 165, 162, 8.570311 – Vol 7 (Julia Brown, Pasi organ, St Cecilia Cathedral, Omaha, Nebraska, USA), BuxWV 158, 138, 188, 173, 214, 147, 249, 195, 245, 144, 154, 170, 163, 8.570312
- Harpsichord music
  - Huguette Grémy-Chauliac – L'Œuvre pour clavecin (3-CD set – CD 1: BuxWV 249, 236, 229, 235, Suite in G minor, 226, 233, 247; CD 2: BuxWV 241, 244, 242, 232, 227, Suite in D minor, 246, 240, 238, 230; CD 3: BuxWV 237, 243, 245, 234, 228, 248, 250), Solstice (éditeur phonographique) (FYCD035-37)
  - Lionel Rogg – Bach & Buxtehude on the Pedal Harpsichord (baroquecds.com – BuxWV 137, 146, 149, 153, 160, 161)
  - Simone Stella – Dieterich Buxtehude – Complete Harpsichord Music (4-CD set – CD 1: BuxWV 248, 240, 237, Ahn. 6, 234, 232, 179, 230, 242, 166; CD 2: BuxWV 247, 241, 228, Suite in a (deest), 243, Suite in d (Ed. Roger 1710), 229, 163; CD 3: BuxWV 246, 235, 249, 239, 226, 168, 244, 231, 165; CD 4: 245, 238, 233, 227, 236, 250), OnClassical (OC51-54Bv) also licensed for Brilliant Classics (94312)
  - Ton Koopman – Dieterich Buxtehude – Opera Omnia series; Vol I, Harpsichord Works 1 (BuxWV 250, 230, 238, 233, 245, 235, 247, 228, 242, 226, 243, 234, 232), Antoine Marchand Records, CC74440 – Vol VI, Harpsichord Works 2 (BuxWV 246, 236, 249, 239, Suite in a (deest), 168, 244, 227, 165, 248, 240, 237, 166, Anh 6, 241, 229), Antoine Marchand Records, CC74445 (complete)
  - Rinaldo Alessandrini (BuxWV 163, 234, 164, 166, 226, 174, 248, 250)
  - Lars Ulrik Mortensen (BuxWV 243, 168, 238, 162, 250, 165, 223, 233, 176, 226, 249, 166, 179, 225, 247, 242, 174, 245, 171, 235, 170, 215)
- Cantatas
  - 6 Cantatas (BuxWV 78, 62, 76, 31, 41, 15), Orchestra Anima Eterna & The Royal Consort, Collegium Vocale, Jos van Immerseel – 1994 – Channel Classics, CCS 7895
  - Sacred Cantatas (BuxWV 47, 94, 56, 73, 174, 12, 48, 38, 60), Emma Kirkby et al., The Purcell Quartet – 2003 – Chandos Records Ltd, Chan 0691
  - Sacred Cantatas Vol. 2 (BuxWV 13, 92, 77, 17, 6, 71, 58, 37, 57), Emma Kirkby, Michael Chance, Charles Daniels, Peter Harvey, The Purcell Quartett – 2005 – Chandos Records Ltd, Chan 0723
  - Sacred Cantatas (BuxWV 104, 59, 97, 161, 107, 53, 64, 108), Matthew White, Katherine Hill, Paul Grindlay, Aradia Ensemble, Kevin Mallon – 2004 – Naxos 8.557041
  - Geistliche Kantaten (Sacred cantatas), Cantus Cölln, Konrad Junghänel, Harmonia Mundi France HMC 901629
  - O Gottes Stadt (BuxWV 87), Wo ist doch mein Freund geblieben? (BuxWV 111) and Herr, wenn ich nur dich hab (BuxWV 38), sung by Johannette Zomer and Peter Harvey on "Death and Devotion", Netherlands Bach Society, Jos van Veldhoven, Channel Classics, CCS SA 20804
  - Dieterich Buxtehude – Opera Omnia, Volume 2, Vocal Works 1, Wacht! Euch zum Streit gefasset macht (Das jüngste Gericht) (BuxWV Anh.3) Ton Koopman, Amsterdam Baroque Orchestra & Choir, Caroline Stam and Orlanda Velez Isidro (soprano), Robin Blaze (alto), Andreas Karasiak (tenor), Klaus Mertens (bass), Antoine Marchand Records, CC72241
  - Dieterich Buxtehude – Opera Omnia, Volume 5, Vocal Works 2 (BuxWV 2, 10, 12, 19, 20, 40, 43, 50–52, 64, 70, 81, 110, 113, 114, 120, 123, 124, Anh 1) Ton Koopman, Amsterdam Baroque Orchestra & Choir, Bettina Pahn and Johannette Zomer (soprano), Bogna Bartosz, Patrick Van Goethem and Daniel Taylor (alto), Jörg Dürmüller and Andreas Karasiak (tenor), Donald Pentvelsen, and Klaus Mertens (bass), Antoine Marchand Records, CC72244
  - Dieterich Buxtehude – Opera Omnia, Volume 7, Vocal Works 3 (BuxWV Anh.4, 7, 24, 25, 41, 47, 62, 63, 68, 72, 77, 79, 116, 119 A, 119 B, 122) Ton Koopman, Amsterdam Baroque Orchestra & Choir, Miriam Meyer, Bettina Pahn and Johannette Zomer (soprano), Bogna Bartosz, Patrick van Goethem and Hugo Naessens (alto), Jörg Dürmüller and Andreas Karasiak (tenor), Donald Bentvelsen and Klaus Mertens (bass), Antoine Marchand Records, CC72246
  - Dieterich Buxtehude – Opera Omnia, Volume 11, Vocal Works 4 (BuxWV 33, 56, 26, 71, 86, 11, 27, 8, anh2, 29, 112, 54, 5, 53, 37, 59, 13) Ton Koopman, Amsterdam Baroque Orchestra & Choir, Bettina Pahn, Miriam Meyer, Siri Thornhill, Johannette Zomer (soprano), Patrick van Goethem, Bogna Bartosz (alto), Jörg Dürmüller, Andreas Karasiak (tenor) & Klaus Mertens (bass), Antoine Marchand Records, CC72250
  - Membra Jesu Nostri, The Sixteen, Harry Christophers, CORO 16082
  - Membra Jesu Nostri, Monteverdi Choir, English Baroque Soloists, Fretwork, John Eliot Gardiner, Archiv Produktion 447 298–2
  - Membra Jesu Nostri, Netherlands Bach Society, Jos van Veldhoven (cond), vocalists Anne Grimm, Johannette Zomer sopranos, Peter de Groot counter-tenor, Andrew Tortise tenor, Bas Ramselaar bass (the soloists act as the chorus), Channel Classics CCS SA 24006; this SACD also features the Fried- und Freudenreiche Hinfarth (BuxWV 76), a series of 2 aria's, sung by Johannette Zomer
  - Membra Jesu Nostri, Masaaki Suzuki, Bach Collegium Japan, Bis Records CD-871
  - Membra Jesu Nostri, Konrad Junghänel, Cantus Cölln, Harmonia Mundi, HMC 901912
