= Musical Minds =

Musical Minds is a Nova documentary based on neurologist Oliver Sacks's 2007 book Musicophilia: Tales of Music and the Brain about music and the human brain aired on June 30, 2009 on Public Broadcasting Service (PBS).

The documentary features blind piano savant Derek Paravicini, Matt Giordano and Tony Cicoria.
