= Matt Savage (American musician) =

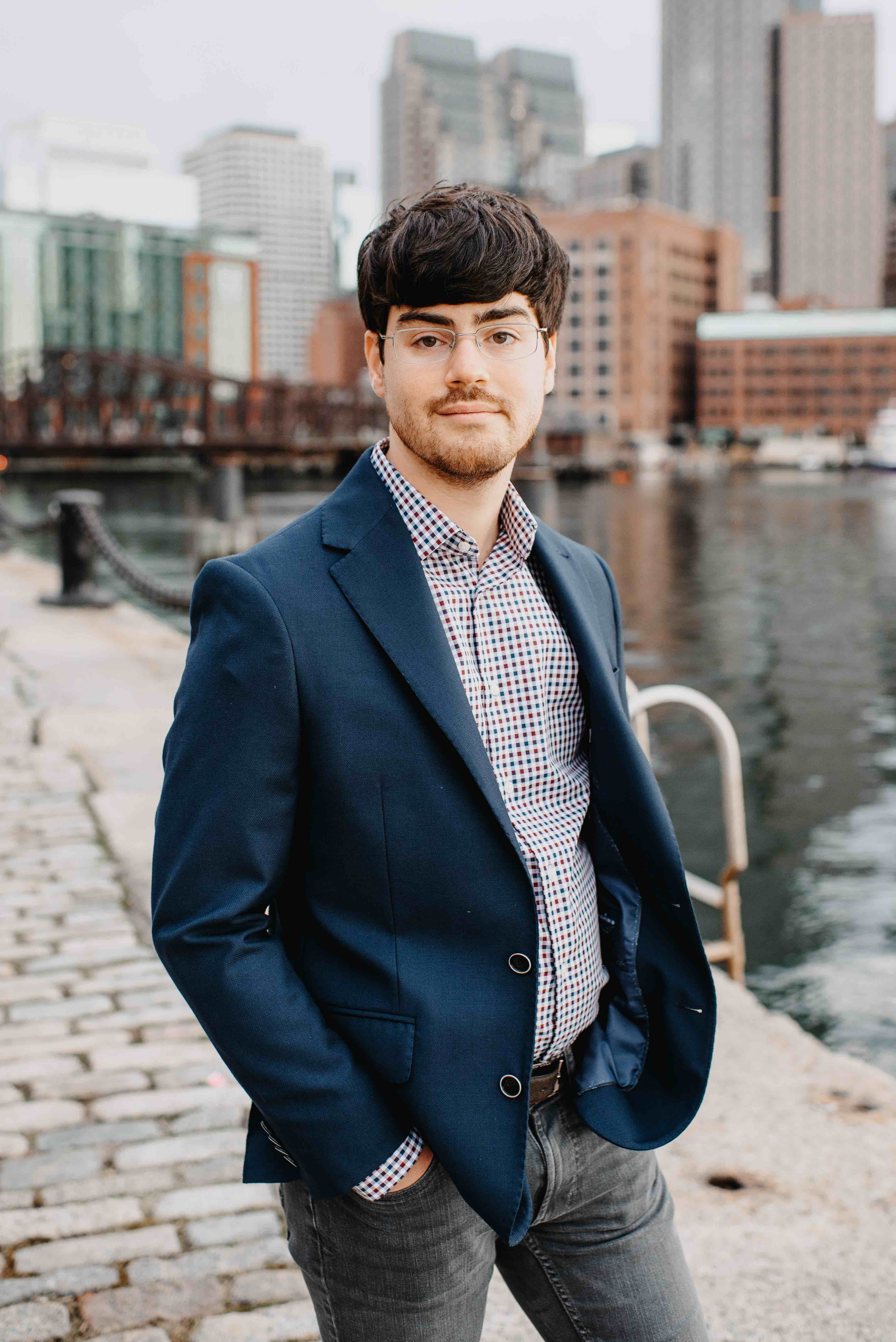
- Savage in 2021

Background information
- Born: Matthew James Savage; May 12, 1992 (age 34); Sudbury, Massachusetts, U.S.
- Genres: Jazz; classical
- Occupations: Musician, composer, teacher
- Instruments: Piano, keyboard
- Website: www.savagerecords.com

Matthew James "Matt" Savage (born May 12, 1992) is an American autistic savant musician.

== Early life ==
Born in Sudbury, Massachusetts, he is the son of Diane and Lawrence "Larry" Savage. Savage was a precocious infant who walked early and learned to read by the age of 18 months. He was diagnosed with pervasive developmental disorder, a form of autism, at age three. He did not like any noises or music during his early childhood.

At age six, Savage taught himself to read piano music. He studied classical piano for less than a year before discovering jazz, which became his main focus.

He and his younger sibling were both home schooled. He began studying at the New England Conservatory of Music in Boston, Massachusetts, in the fall of 1999. He continued his classical studies as well.

Among Savage's talents are hyperlexia and perfect pitch. Coupled with his extremely high intelligence, these abilities have allowed him to achieve other distinctions as well, such as winning a statewide geography bee.

== Career ==
He has no formal instruction in musical composition. Savage has released twelve albums as a solo performer, as leader of the Matt Savage Trio and as leader of various sized ensembles. By the age of 14, he had also performed with Chaka Khan and other popular singers.

In 2006, at age 14, he was featured on a CNN report about the human brain which said he was a savant.

== Education ==
In December 2012 Savage received a Bachelor of Music (B.Mus.) in Performance (Piano) from Berklee College of Music and in May 2015 he received his Master of Music (M.Mus.) in Jazz Performance (Piano) from the Manhattan School of Music.

== See also ==
- Child prodigy
- Nick van Bloss
- Tony Cicoria

Preceded by	New Hampshire State Geographic Bee winner 2004	Succeeded by
