= Miquel Villalba =

Spanish classical pianist

Miquel Villalba is a Spanish classical pianist.

== Biography and career ==
Miquel Villalba began studying music at the Escolania of Montserrat and at the Conservatori Superior Municipal de Música in Barcelona with Antoni Besses. He later studied with Claude Helffer in Paris, and with the Belgian piano teacher Frédéric Gevers. Villalba has won prizes in a number of national and international piano competitions, such as those in Albacete, Granada and Carlet, the Maria Canals competition in Barcelona, and the Jonge Virtuozen competition in Antwerp. Villalba also received the Premi de l’Associació Catalana de Compositors and the Premi Generalitat de Catalunya.

Villalba has performed as a soloist and with chamber ensembles in many countries, such as his native Spain, France, Belgium, Germany, Brazil, Venezuela and the Philippines.

Villalba has recorded several discs for the Naxos and Marco Polo labels, including a five-disc set of the complete piano works of Manuel Blancafort.
