= J.S. Bach: Goldberg Variations (Keith Jarrett recording) =

Live album by Keith Jarrett
- Released: 1989
- Recorded: January 10–12, 1989
- Studio: Yatsugatake Kohgen Ongakudoh; Japan
- Genre: Classical
- Length: 61:19
- Label: ECM New Series; ECM 1395
- Producer: Manfred Eicher

Keith Jarrett chronology
Paris Concert (1988)	J.S. Bach: Goldberg Variations (1989)	Standards in Norway (1989)

J.S. Bach: Goldberg Variations is a live solo classical album by American jazz pianist Keith Jarrett recorded at the Yatsugatake Kohgen Ongakudoh in Japan over three days in January 1989 and released on the ECM New Series later that year, consisting a complete performance of Johann Sebastian Bach's Goldberg Variations on harpsichord.

== Reception ==
Professional ratings
Review scores
Source	Rating
AllMusic	3/5 stars

The AllMusic review by Richard S. Ginell awarded the album 3 stars states:

Keith Jarrett is up against an imposing legacy as he tackles what has become the most famous set of variations in Western music.... He's not in any hurry, not tempted to showboat or flaunt his considerable technique—and in no way does this jazz pianist try to make the variations swing à la Jacques Loussier. The added ornamentation seems to be random and so are his observance of the repeats; he only does so in ten of the variations. As a result, we are left with a technically adept, sometimes aimless, intelligently conceived, ultimately not very moving or exhilarating rendition of the music—a confirmation of Jarrett's keyboard prowess for his fans, but not much in the way of competition for the brass ring among Goldbergs.

== Track listing ==
All compositions by Johann Sebastian Bach

1. "Aria" - 2:36
2. "Variatio 1 a 1 Clav." - 1:17
3. "Variatio 2 a 1 Clav." - 2:17
4. "Variatio 3 Canone all'unisono. a 1 Clav." - 2:43
5. "Variatio 4 a 1 Clav." - 1:19
6. "Variatio 5 a 1 ovvero 2 Clav." - 1:05
7. "Variatio 6 Canone alla seconda. a 1 Clav." - 1:42
8. "Variatio 7 a 1 ô vero 2 Clav. l tempo di giga" - 1:11
9. "Variatio 8 a 2 Clav." - 1:12
10. "Variatio 9 Canone alla terza. a 1 Clav." - 2:23
11. "Variatio 10 Fughetta. a 1 Clav." - 1:05
12. "Variatio 11 a 2 Clav." - 1:24
13. "Variatio 12 Canone alla quarta. a 1 Clav." - 1:47
14. "Variatio 13 a 2 Clav." - 2:57
15. "Variatio 14 a 2 Clav." - 1:19
16. "Variatio 15 Canone alla quinta. a 1 Clav. Andante" - 2:07
17. "Variatio 16 Ouverture. a 1 Clav." - 3:10
18. "Variatio 17 a 2 Clav." - 1:16
19. "Variatio 18 Canone alla sesta. a 1 Clav." - 0:55
20. "Variatio 19 a 1 Clav." - 0:49
21. "Variatio 20 a 2 Clav." - 1:14
22. "Variatio 21 Canone alla settima. a 1 Clav." - 2:58
23. "Variatio 22 a 1 Clav. alla breve" - 0:53
24. "Variatio 23 a 2 Clav." - 1:15
25. "Variatio 24 Canone all'ottava. a 1 Clav." - 1:44
26. "Variatio 25 a 2 Clav. Adagio - 7:20
27. "Variatio 26 a 2 Clav." - 1:18
28. "Variatio 27 Canone alla nona. a 2 Clav." - 1:22
29. "Variatio 28 a 2 Clav." - 1:23
30. "Variatio 29 a 1 Ovvero 2 Clav." - 2:35
31. "Variatio 30 Quodlibet. a 1 Clav." - 2:09
32. "Aria" - 2:34

== Personnel ==
- Keith Jarrett – harpsichord
