= Alexander Gurning =

Belgian pianist, composer and improviser (born 1973)

Alexander Gurning (born 1973) is a Belgian pianist, composer and improviser.

== Early life and education ==
Born to both Polish and Indonesian parents, Alexander Gurning studied at the Royal Conservatory of Brussels. After completing his studies, he became an assistant in the class of Russian pianist Evgeny Moguilevsky for three years. Soon after, Gurning moved to Moscow to attend further classes with Lev Naumov and Victor Merzhanov at the Moscow Conservatory.

== Career ==
Gurning has appeared in festivals such as the Progetto Martha Argerich in Lugano, the Schleswig-Holstein Musik Festival in Germany, the Festival International de Piano de la Roque d'Anthéron in France, the Sapporo Music Festival in Japan, the International Piano Festival of Obidos (Portugal), the Saratoga Chamber Music Festival, the Tanglewood Music Festival (United States) and the Verbier Festival in China.

Gurning has played with the Boston Symphony Orchestra, the Philadelphia Orchestra, the Orchestra della Svizzera Italiana, the Orchestre Philharmonique de Radio France, the Orchestre National de Belgique, the Orchestre de Chambre de Lausanne with conductors such as Myung-Whun Chung, Charles Dutoit, and Christian Zacharias.

The recording career of Gurning started with a ‘Choc’ award from Le Monde for his first solo album, in the series 'Martha Argerich Presents', with works of Stravinsky and Debussy. Other recording collaborations include frequent appearances with various musicians in the annual EMI boxes made of live recordings from the Lugano Music Festival. Gurning received another award from the French magazine, Diapason, as pianist of the Talweg trio, together with Sébastien Surel (violin) and Sébastien Walnier (cello), for their Tchaikovsky/Shostakovich album released on Triton in 2008.

Gurning is also a founding member of the Soledad ensemble, specialized in renewing the tradition of tango. Together with Manu Comté (accordion and bandoneon), Jean-Frédéric Molard (violin), Patrick Schuyer (guitars) and Géry Cambier (bass), Soledad released their albums on Virgin Classics (Soledad and Del Diablo) and on ENja (In Concert).

In 2020, Gurning served as a judge of the AntwerPiano International Competition and Festival in Antwerp.
