= Leah Zelikhman =

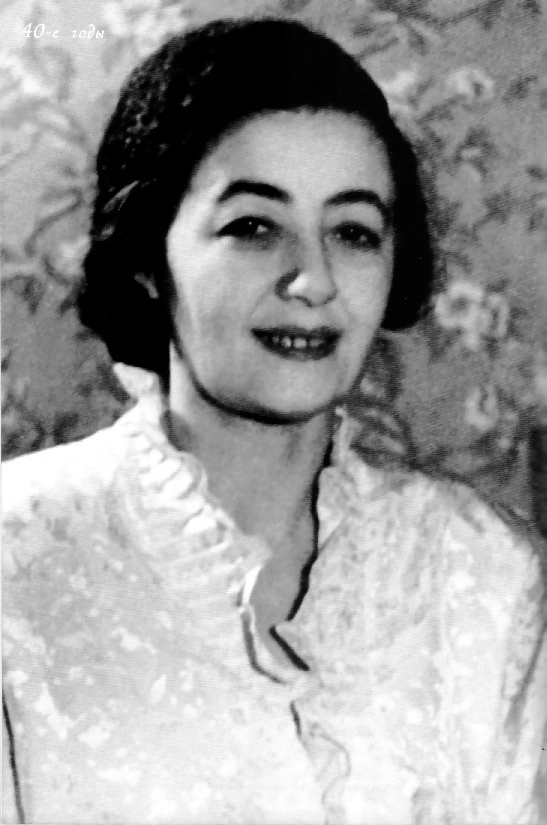

Leah Ilyinichna Zelikhman (Russian: Лия Ильинична Зелихман; 1910–1971) was a Soviet pianist and pedagogue.

After studying with Leonid Nikolayev, she taught at the Central Special Music School of the Leningrad Conservatory for many years. Among her pupils were Grigory Sokolov, Valery Sigalevitch, and Pavel Gililov.
