= Mika Väyrynen (musician) =

Finnish musician (born 1967)

Mika Väyrynen (born 1967 in Helsinki, Finland) is a Finnish accordion artist.

== Career ==
He started his performance career by giving his debut recital in 1985, when was just 17 years old. Since then, he has concertized all over the world, including most of the European countries, all Nordic countries, Japan, Russia, USA and China. He has performed as soloist of practically every major Finnish orchestra, as well as the Estonian State Philharmonic Orchestra, the Tallinn Chamber Orchestra and the Copenhagen Philharmonic Orchestra. Conductors with whom he has performed are renowned maestros including Okko Kamu, Sakari Oramo, John Storgårds, Ralf Gothóni, Juha Nikkola, Olari Elts, Vello Pähn, Atso Almila, Andres Mustonen and many others.

He started his career in 1990 and has gone on to record more than 20 CDs, with solo repertoire, concertos and chamber music. He is collaborating with contemporary composers such as Aulis Sallinen, Anatoli Kuskajov and Bogdan Precz.

In 2005 he opened the chamber concerto “Metamorphoses” by Paavo Korpijaakko in Kuhmo Chamber Music Festival, and in 2006 he opened the Concerto for Accordion and Symphony Orchestra By Pehr Henrik Nordgren.

He is also a respected teacher and lecturer. He has taught at the Sibelius Academy since 1999, and was appointed Professor of Accordion in Kärtner Landeskonservatorium in Klagenfurt, Austria from 1993 until 1996. His students have won several prizes in competitions.
