= OnClassical =

Italian independent record label

- Launch date: Before November 2003
- Platform: Platform independent
- Pricing model: Visitor's choice
- Availability: World Wide Web Flash reader, downloadable art-covers
- Website: onclassical.com

OnClassical is an Italian independent record label. It features classical music mostly for single instrument or chamber ensemble.

== History ==
Founded in April 2003 by Alessandro Simonetto, harpsichordist, producer and sound engineer, it enlists selected first-prize international contest winners and young talented musicians who do not hold exclusive contracts with managers or traditional recording houses.

OnClassical was the first Italian label to produce, realize, distribute and sell recordings through the web and amongst the first to apply the new philosophy of Creative Commons to MP3 and other files.

OnClassical has no relationship with societies of rights collecting due to the facts it only threats public domain music.

=== Versions ===
The website started as a simple collection of classical music audio performances of some of the most important pianists such as Maurizio Baglini, Rustem Hayroudinoff, Gianluca Luisi, Alberto Nosè, Mariangela Vacatello and other. Only in January 2004 (second version) it evolved as an online record label and a mobile recording studio working with its own equipment. The third, of February 2005 (the 14th), and the last version, of July 2007 (the 14th), have always maintained the graphic unchanged (white blackground with yellow left border) and the main concepts tied to contents and licences.

==== The late versions ====
Since 2006 the house only publishes self-produced recordings through a more careful selection.

Albums are sold in a CD-quality uncompressed format (PCM / WAV, at 44.1 kHz × 16-bit while more recently only Studio Masters FLAC are actually available (recent albums at 88.2 kHz x 24 bit). No DRM are present inside the files. Compressed formats can be found through the online stores such as Amazon, iTunes, emusic, Qobuz, eClassical and many other shops.

== The recordings ==
The recordings are considered of high quality. Some recordings have also been licensed for notable record labels such as Naxos or Brilliant Classics.

Today the catalogue includes more than 200 titles distributed by Naxos of America. One of the main discographic projects is the recording of the complete works for clavier of Buxtehude and Bohm as performed by Florentine organist and harpsichordist Simone Stella now also released by Brilliant Classics.

== Collaborations ==
OnClassical company furnishes the largest quantity of the classical music for Jamendo pro: the commercial program for music licensing at jamendo.com.

=== See also ===
- Creative Commons
