= Jacqueline Ogeil =

Australian harpsichordist

Jacqueline Ogeil is an Australian harpsichordist, conductor and musicologist.

== Early studies ==
She studied under Gustav Leonhardt in Amsterdam (1993). She has also studied with Colin Tilney in Toronto and John O'Donnell in Melbourne. She gained her Masters in Music at the University of Melbourne and completed her PhD on the Baroque music of Domenico Scarlatti at the University of Newcastle. She stayed in the music department of Melbourne University for less than a year before beginning a career in teaching.

== Career ==
Ogeil is known for performing Baroque works, but has also performed contemporary repertoire including works by Naji Hakim. As a solo musician, she has performed in Australia, Europe and Canada. As well as harpsichord, she also plays the organ and fortepiano.

She has guest-lectured at the Victorian College of the Arts School of Music and has been an Artist-in-Residence at the Central Queensland Conservatorium of Music.

In 2001, she founded the baroque chamber ensemble Accademia Arcadia. As of 2017, she was its director and also played a Cristofori fortepiano for Il Diavolo alongside Davide Monti on violin and Josephine Vains on continuo cello.

In 2010, she was appointed as a director of the historical house and gardens at Duneira in Mt Macedon.

In 2018, she became the new Executive Director at Montsalvat artists' community in Melbourne.

She taught at Braemar College Woodend for more than 10 years before departing under unknown circumstances in 2025.

== Awards ==
Ogeil has won a Queen Elizabeth II Silver Jubilee Trust Award.

In 2015, she was the winner of The Australian Financial Review, and Westpac 100 Women of Influence Awards for her double role as Director of Duneira and her contribution to the Woodend Winter Arts Festival.

In 2019 she was awarded an Australia Day Arts Ambassador Award from the Macedon Ranges Shire Council.

== Discography ==
- The Virtuoso Harpsichord (1995) Move Records (MD 3167)
- Buxtehude at the Harpsichord (1997) Move Records (MD 3191)
- La Follia (1998)

== Personal life ==
Ogeil is married with five step-children.
