= Valery Sigalevitch =

Russian pianist

Valery Sigalevitch (Russian: Валерий Львович Сигалевич, Valerij Lvovič Sigalevič; born March, 4 1950) is a Russian classical concert pianist.

== Biography ==
Sigalevitch was born in Simferopol, Crimea. His father Lev Sigalevitch was a painter and his mother a concert pianist and professor. He began playing the piano at the age of six and, showing prodigious talent, was accepted at the special music class of the Leningrad Conservatory at age seven to study with Leah Zelikhman. He continued his studies at the Moscow Tchaikovsky Conservatory in the class of Vera Gornostayeva. He finished his studies winning the first prize. In 1977 he left the Soviet Union and emigrated to Israel. For the next two years he studied with Nikita Magaloff in Geneva and with Arie Vardi in Tel Aviv. His repertoire includes works by J.S. Bach, Haydn, Mozart, Beethoven, Schubert, Liszt, Brahms, Mussorgsky, Debussy, Ravel, Scriabin, Rachmaninoff, Prokofiev and other composers. It is, however, Chopin's and Schumann's works which occupy a central position in his repertoire. Since commencing his concert career, he has received numerous enthusiastic reviews from critics in Europe and Israel. He has often played under the baton of Valery Gergiev.

He is also a dedicated connoisseur of paintings, literature, and philosophy. He currently resides in La Rochelle.

Sigalevitch's discography includes the complete works for solo piano by Robert Schumann (14 CDs) released in 2016 for Polyphonia Records.

A sought-after pedagogue, many of his students are prizewinners of important competitions. Among them were Ingmar Lazar and Jules Matton.

== Sources ==
- Biography from the album "Valery Sigalevitch spielt Chopin" Colosseum COL 0646.
