= Grigory Sokolov =

Russian pianist (born 1950)

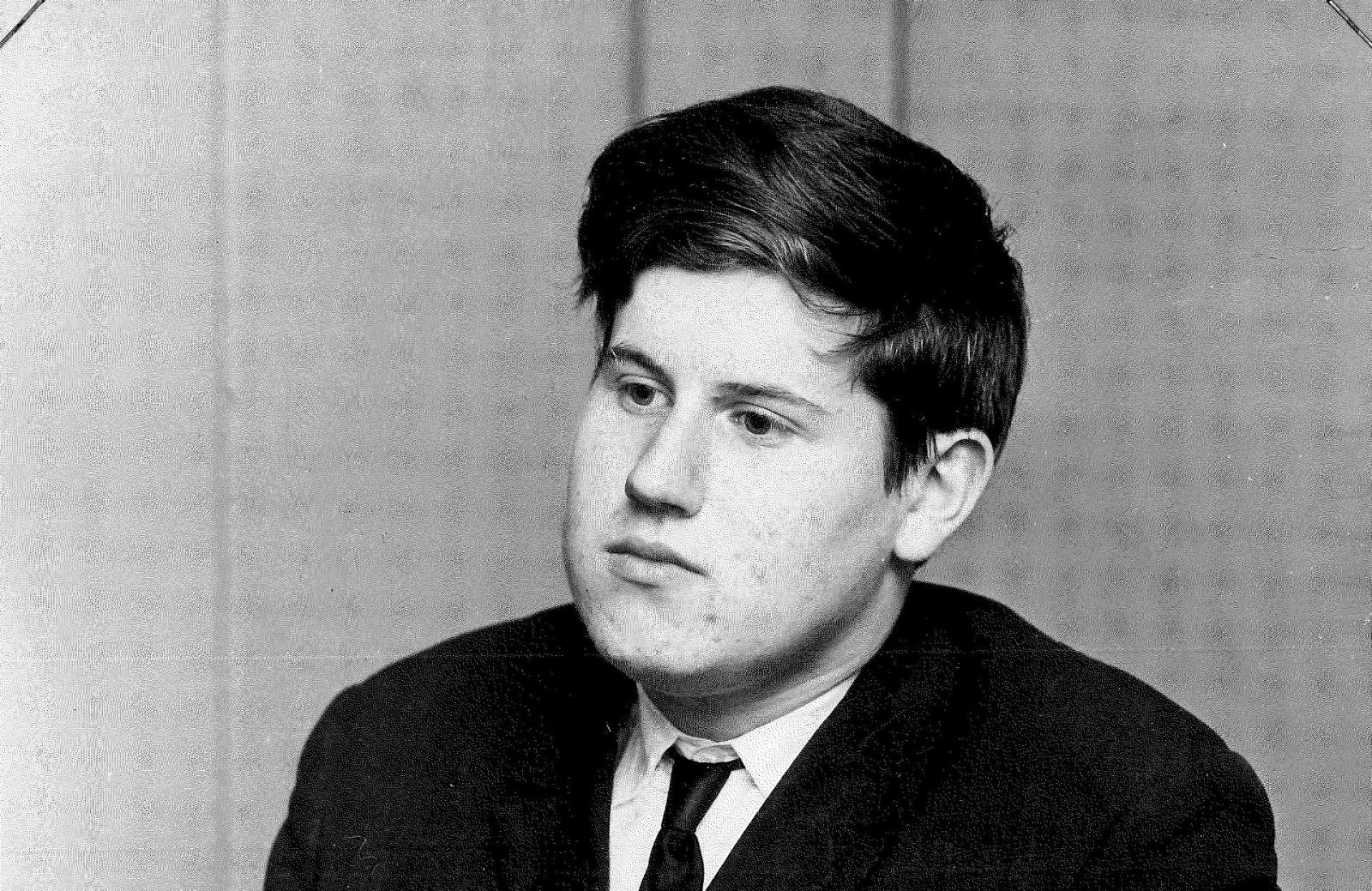
- Sokolov in 1967
- Born: 18 April 1950 (age 76); Leningrad, Russian SFSR, Soviet Union
- Citizenship: Russian and Spanish
- Education: Leningrad Conservatory
- Occupation: Pianist

Grigory Lipmanovich Sokolov (Russian: Григо́рий Ли́пманович Соколо́в; born 18 April 1950) is a Russian and Spanish pianist. He is among the most esteemed of living pianists, with his repertoire spanning composers from the Baroque period such as Bach, Couperin or Rameau up to Schoenberg and Arapov. He regularly tours Europe (excluding the UK).

== Early life and education ==
Sokolov was born in Leningrad (now Saint Petersburg) Russian SFSR, Soviet Union in 1950 His father was Lipman Girshevich Sokolov, who was Jewish, and his mother was Galina Nikolayevna Zelenetskaya. He began studying the piano at the age of five and entered the Leningrad Conservatory's special school for children at the age of seven to study with Leah Zelikhman. After graduating from the children's school, he continued studying at the Conservatory with Moisey Khalfin. At 12, he gave his first major recital in Moscow, in a concert of works by Bach, Beethoven, Schumann, Chopin, Mendelssohn, Rachmaninoff, Scriabin, Liszt, Debussy and Shostakovich at the Philharmonic Society. At age 16, he came to international attention when he was awarded the gold medal in the 1966 International Tchaikovsky Piano Competition, making him the youngest ever winner. It seems this may have been a surprising result: "16-year old Grisha Sokolov, who finally became the winner of that competition, was not taken seriously by anyone at that time."

== Career ==
"He possesses brilliant finger and chord technique, he easily wields the piano, so easily that he performs the prestissimo of the last movement of the Saint-Saëns Concerto No. 2 with truly refined lightness. It was a startling performance. Doubtless we are going to hear much more about this young talented pianist..."

Despite his success at the Tchaikovsky Competition in his youth, Sokolov's international career only began to develop towards the end of the 1980s. It has been speculated that this was because of his not defecting and the limited travelling allowed under the Soviet regime, but this is refuted by the fact that Sokolov gave U.S. tours in 1969, 1971, 1975 and 1979, as well as numerous recitals elsewhere in the world, e.g. Finland and Japan. "Sokolov's life as a touring soloist is quite overcrowded. He tours a great deal in both his motherland and abroad." The 1980s seem to have posed something of a stumbling block to Sokolov's career in the U.S. "In the beginning, I played a lot of single concerts in America, in 1969, '71 and, I think, 1975. After that there was a break in relationships between the U.S. and the Soviet Union — they were disconnected by the Afghanistan war. A scheduled tour in the U.S. was cancelled in 1980. Then all cultural agreements between the two countries were cancelled." In addition, during the breakup of the former Soviet Union, Sokolov played no concerts outside Russia.

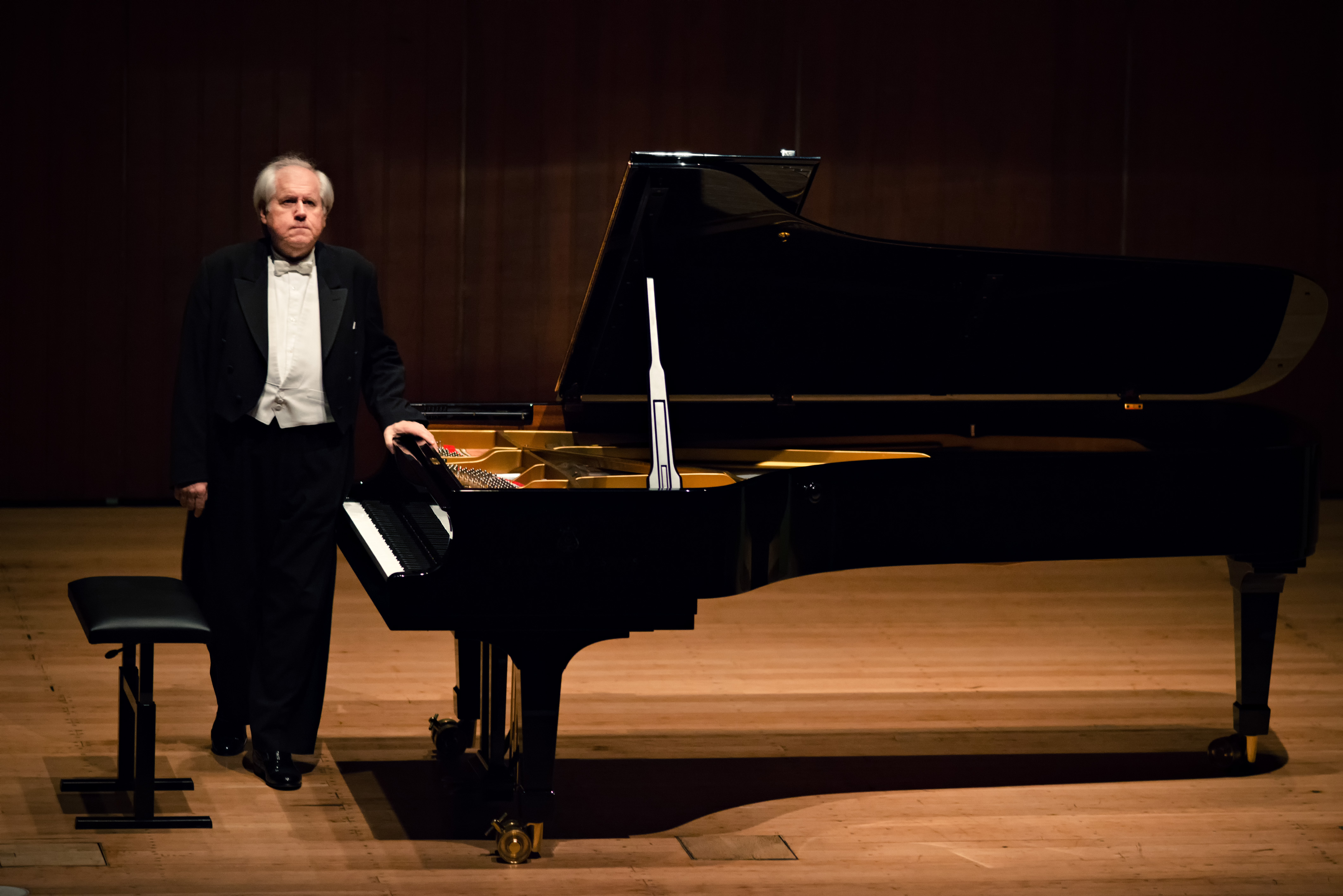
Grigory Sokolov during a concert in Kongresshaus Stadthalle Heidelberg in 2015

He is now a well-known figure in concert halls around Europe, but much less so in the U.S. Sokolov has released relatively few recordings to date, and released none for the 20 years between 1995 and 2015. But in 2014 he signed a contract with Deutsche Grammophon to release recordings of some of his live performances, and in 2015 he released a 2-CD live Salzburg recital featuring two sonatas by Mozart, Chopin's cycle of 24 Preludes, and encore pieces by Scriabin, Chopin, Rameau, Purcell and Bach. Since the signing with Deutsche Grammophon, he has released several albums that were mainly received well by the public.

In August 2022, he was granted Spanish nationality.

Sokolov is known for the precision of his playing, particularly ornaments, and for a reluctance to decide on a precise programme until soon before his concerts.

== Public statements ==
In March 2009, Sokolov cancelled a planned concert in London because of British visa requirements which demanded that non-E.U. workers provide fingerprints and eye prints with a visa application (he also cancelled his 2008 concert on similar grounds). Sokolov protested that such requirements had echoes of Soviet oppression.

After British music journalist Norman Lebrecht received the Cremona Music Award 2014, Sokolov, upon learning of his being awarded the Cremona Music Award 2015, refused to accept the honor, making this statement on his website: "According to my ideas about elementary decency, it is shame to be in the same award-winners list with Lebrecht". Sokolov's statement appeared to refer to personal remarks Lebrecht had made about Sokolov's family.

== Influences ==
Sokolov cited the following pianists as having inspired him in his years of studies: "Of those whom I heard on the stage I'd like to name first of all Emil Gilels. Judging by the records, it was Rachmaninoff, Sofronitsky, Glenn Gould, Solomon [and] Lipatti. As to aesthetics, I feel most close to Anton Rubinstein."

== Repertoire ==
In 2006, Sokolov explained his decision to give fewer concerto performances. Among the adverse factors he cited were inadequate rehearsal time and that one can rarely pair with a conductor whose approach fits his own. He also said that by repeating his solo programs in many venues over time, he deepens his interpretations, whereas a concerto performance starts over at the first rehearsal in each engagement.

== Recordings ==
Sokolov originally published on the "Opus 111" label, later acquired by Naïve Records. From 2012 to 2015 he published on the Melodiya label. Since 2015 he has been represented by Deutsche Grammophon.

=== Opus 111 ===
- Chopin: 24 Préludes Op. 28 (1990, live)
- Beethoven: Diabelli Variations (1991)
- Prokofiev, Rachmaninov, Scriabin (1991)
- Beethoven: Piano Sonatas Nos. 4 & 28; 2 Rondos Op. 51; Alla Ingharese (1992)
- Chopin: Sonata No. 2 Op 35 "Marche Funebre"; 12 Études Op 25 (1993)
- Brahms: Vier Balladen; Sonata in F minor (1994)
- Schubert: Sonata in G major; Sonata in B flat major (1996)
- Chopin: France (1999)
- Chopin & George Sand (1999)
- Bach: The Art of Fugue (2000)
- Beethoven, Schubert, Chopin, Scriabin, Prokofiev, Rachmaninov (Opus 111/Naive, 5 CDs, 2003)
  - Last CD also released separately

=== Naive ===
- Live in Paris (2004)
- Bach, Beethoven, Chopin, Brahms (5 CDs, 2005)
- Beethoven: Sonatas Nos. 4 & 28; Rondos (2005)
- Chopin: Préludes, Op. 28; Sonata No. 2, Op. 35; Études, Op. 25 (2009)
- Grigory Sokolov & Janusz Olejniczak play Chopin (2010)

=== Melodiya ===
- Bach: Goldberg Variations (2 CDs, 2012)
- Beethoven, Chopin, Schumann, Brahms, Tchaikovsky, Saint-Saëns (4 CDs, 2013)
- Ludwig van Beethoven, Alexander Sciabin, Boris Arapov (2 CDs, 2014)
- Schubert, Schumann, Chopin, Scriabin, Stravinsky, Prokofiev (2 CDs, 2015)
- "Limited Edition": Bach: Partita No. 2 in C minor BWV 826; English Suite No. 2 in A minor, BWV 807 (2015, recorded 1982/1988)

=== Deutsche Grammophon ===
- The Salzburg Recital (2015)
- Schubert & Beethoven (2016)
- Mozart, Rachmaninov: Concertos (released 2017, recorded 2005 and 1995)
- Beethoven, Brahms, Mozart (2020)
- Grigory Sokolov at Esterházy Palace (2022)
- Purcell & Mozart (2024)

=== Other labels ===
- Chopin: Piano Concerto No. 1 (Denon, 2006, recorded 27 November 1977 in Munich)
- Beethoven: Sonata No. 29 "Hammerklavier" (Mobile Fidelity Sound Lab, 1993)
