= Musicophilia =

2007 non-fiction book by Oliver Sacks

Musicophilia: Tales of Music and the Brain
- Author: Oliver Sacks
- Cover artist: Chip Kidd
- Language: English
- Publisher: Knopf
- Publication date: 2007-10-16
- ISBN: 978-1-4000-4081-0
- OCLC: 85692744
- Dewey Decimal: 781/.11 22
- LC Class: ML3830 .S13 2007
- Preceded by: Oaxaca Journal (2002)
- Followed by: The Mind's Eye (2010)

Musicophilia: Tales of Music and the Brain is a 2007 book by Oliver Sacks. It explores a range of psychological and physiological ailments and their connections to music. It is divided into four parts, each with a distinctive theme: Haunted by Music examines mysterious onsets of musicality and musicophilia (and musicophobia); A Range of Musicality looks at musical oddities such as musical synesthesia; parts three and four are entitled Memory, Movement, and Music and Emotion, Identity, and Music. Each chapter is dedicated to a particular case study (or several related case studies) that fit the overarching theme of the section. Four case studies from the book are featured in the NOVA program Musical Minds aired on June 30, 2009.

== Purpose ==
According to Sacks, he wrote Musicophilia to widen the general populace's understanding of music and its effects on the brain. Sacks writes in his preface that music is omnipresent, influencing human's everyday lives in how we think and act. However, unlike other animal species (such as birds) whose musical prowess is more easily understood in biological and evolutionary terms, humanity's draw towards music and song is less clear-cut. There is no "music center" of the brain, yet the vast majority of humans have an innate ability to distinguish music and "perceive tones, timbre, pitch intervals, melodic contours, harmony, and (perhaps most elementally) rhythm." Sacks examines human beings' musical inclination through the lens of musical therapy and treatment, as there are a number of documented cases of the successful treatment of neurological injuries and diseases with music. This understanding (along with a medical case Sacks witnessed in 1966 wherein a Parkinson's patient was successfully treated via music therapy) galvanized Sacks to create an episodic compilation of cases where patients were treated by music. In doing so, Sacks concertizes each example to explain to a lay audience the neurological factors in the patient's healing.

== Reviews ==
In a review for The Washington Post, Peter D. Kramer writes, "In Musicophilia, Sacks turns to the intersection of music and neurology—music as affliction and music as treatment." He continues, "Lacking the dynamic that propels Sacks's other work, Musicophilia threatens to disintegrate into a catalogue of disparate phenomena.... What makes Musicophilia cohere is Sacks himself. He is the book's moral argument. Curious, cultured, caring, in his person Sacks justifies the medical profession and, one is tempted to say, the human race." Kramer concludes, "Sacks is, in short, the ideal exponent of the view that responsiveness to music is intrinsic to our makeup. He is also the ideal guide to the territory he covers. Musicophilia allows readers to join Sacks where he is most alive, amid melodies and with his patients."

Musicophilia was listed as one of the best books of 2007 by The Washington Post.

== Music and the brain ==
Sacks discusses several different conditions associated with music, such as musical hallucinations, absolute pitch, and synesthesia; and non-musical conditions that can be helped by music, including blindness, amnesia, and Alzheimer's disease.

=== Musical conditions ===
Sacks first discusses musical seizures. His principal example is a patient who had a tumor in his left temporal lobe which caused him to have seizures, during which he heard music. Sacks then writes about musical hallucinations that often accompany deafness, partial hearing loss, or conditions like tinnitus. Sacks also focuses a lot on absolute pitch, where a person is able to immediately identify the pitch of a musical note. Another condition Sacks spends a lot of time on is synesthesia. Sacks discusses several different types of synesthesia: key synesthesia, non-musical synesthesia centered on numbers, letters, and days, synesthesia centered on sounds in general, synesthesia centered on rhythm and tempo, and synesthesia in which the person sees lights and shapes instead of colors. Sacks also describes cases where synesthesia has accompanied blindness.

=== Conditions affected ===
Sacks discusses how blindness can affect the perception of music and musical notes, and he also writes that absolute pitch is much more common in blind musicians than it is in sighted musicians. Sacks writes about Clive Wearing, who has severe amnesia. Sacks writes about how, even though Clive has such severe amnesia, he still remembers how to read piano music and play the piano. However, Clive can only remember how to do so in the moment. Sacks also writes about Tourette syndrome and the effects that music can have on tics, for example, slowing tics down to match the tempo of a song. Sacks writes about Parkinson's disease, and how, similar to with people who have Tourette's, music with a strong rhythmic beat can help with movement and coordination. Sacks briefly discusses Williams syndrome and how children with Williams syndrome were found to be very responsive to music. Sacks finishes his book with a discussion of Alzheimer's disease and dementia. He discusses how music therapy can help people with these conditions regain memory.

=== Behavioral effects ===
Certain portions of the brain are associated with how we use the brain to interact with music. For example, the cerebellum, a portion that coordinates movement and stores muscle memory, responds well to the introduction of music. For example, an Alzheimer's patient would not be able to recognize his wife, but would still remember how to play the piano because he dedicated this knowledge to muscle memory when he was young. Those memories never fade. Another example is the Putamen. This portion of the brain processes rhythm and regulates body movement and coordination. When introduced to music, if the amount of dopamine in the area is increased, it increases our response to rhythm. By doing this, music has the ability to temporarily stop the symptoms of such diseases as Parkinson's Disease. The music serves as a cane to these patients, and when the music is taken away, the symptoms return. When it comes to which music people respond best to, it is a matter of individual background. In patients with dementia, it is found that most patients respond to music from their youth, rather than relying on a certain rhythm or element. Neuroscientist Kiminobu Sugaya explains "That means memories associated with music are emotional memories, which never fade out-even in Alzheimer's patients".

== Studies on the effects of music therapy ==
Since the 1970s, there have been multiple studies on the benefits of music therapy for clients with medical conditions, trauma, learning disabilities, and handicaps. Most of the documented studies for children have shown a positive effect in promoting self-actualization and developing receptive, cognitive, and expressive capabilities. While the studies conducted with adults 18+ had overall positive effects, the conclusions were limited because of overt bias and small sample sizes.

Since music is a fundamental aspect of every culture, it embodies every human emotion and can even transport us to an earlier time through our memory. Oliver Sacks, author of Musicophilia, acknowledges the unconscious effects of music as our body tends to join in the rhythmic motions involuntarily. Working with clients with a variety of neurological conditions, Sacks observed the therapeutic potential and susceptibility to music. Even with the loss of language, music becomes the vehicle for expression, feeling, and interaction.

Well-known music therapists Paul Nordoff and Clive Robbins documented their work with audio recordings and videos of the transformative results of music with children who had emotional or behavioral problems, traumatic experiences, or handicaps. Robbins classifies the "Music Child" as the inner self in every child that evokes a healthy musical response. It is music that becomes the catalyst for discovering the child's potential. In essence, musical play creates an atmosphere that emboldens a child to free expression and reproductive skills. Sometimes family members observe immediate effects because selfhood is encouraged and nurtured and thus a child's personality develops in response to music.

First, the music therapist assesses each client to determine impairments, preferences, and skill level. Notably, every person appreciates different musical genres. Next, treatment is determined based on individualized goals and selection as well as frequency and length of sessions. Finally, the progress of the client is evaluated and updated based on effectiveness. Although sessions are typically structured, therapist also remain flexible and try to meet clients where they are at emotionally and physically.

When music therapy was first introduced in tandem with other medical fields, it was mostly receptive and patients listened to live solo performances or pre-recorded songs. Today, music therapist allow for more creative interactions by having clients improvise, reproduce music or imitate melodies vocally or with an instrument, compose their own songs, and/or listen during artistic expression or with movement.

Recently, studies have been conducted on the effects of music with chemo patients, stroke patients, patients with Alzheimer, spinal or brain injury, and hospice patients. According to a 2017 report from Magee, Clark, Tamplin, and Bradt, a common theme of all their studies was the positive effect music had on mood, mental and physical state, increase in motivation and social engagement, and a connection with the client's musical identity. From 2008-2012, the Department of Oncology/ Hematology of the University Medical Center in Hamburg-Eppendorf orchestrated a randomized pilot study to determine if music therapy helped patients cope with pain and reduce chemotherapy side effects. The sessions were given twice a week for twenty minutes and patients could choose either receptive or active methods. Each week, the quality of life, functioning ability, and level of depression/anxiety were assessed. Although emotional functioning scores increased and perception of pain improved significantly, they determined the outcome was inconclusive because patients have differing levels of manageable side effects and a hope to survive may influence expectations of treatment. However, patients rated the program helpful and potentially beneficial. Moreover, the feasibility of these studies allows for music therapists to practice in educational, psychiatric, medical, and private settings. Although there haven't been any statistical significance based on few empirical adult studies, the trend shows improvements on most measures.
