= Richard Lester (harpsichordist) =

English harpsichordist (born 1945)

Richard Lester (born 1945) is an English harpsichordist, organist, fortepianist and musicologist.

== Early life and education ==
Lester was born in Twickenham, Middlesex, the only son of Elsie Violet Evelyn and Sydney Arthur Lester, both of whom were amateur musicians. He attended Whitton Secondary School in Middlesex, and the London College of Music, where he graduated as a Fellow. He studied piano with Bernard Roberts, organ with David Lang, and harpsichord with George Malcolm.

== Career ==
Lester made his London debut in 1973 at London's Wigmore Hall and two years later, following a Purcell Room recital, he was described by the Daily Telegraph critic, David Money as "one of our leading players." Since then he has given harpsichord and organ recitals in the UK and abroad and performed on BBC Radio and television. Dame Janet Baker selected his recording of Scarlatti sonatas as her "favourite" on BBC Radio 4's Desert Island Discs in 1982. He has given master classes at Dartington Summer School, and was Director of music at the Mall School in Twickenham from 1986 – 1992 before taking up the position as head of music at Oakley Hall School in Cirencester, a town where he has lived with his wife, Jackie since 1989. As Master of the Choristers at Cirencester Parish Church in 1994, he directed courses there and at Bristol Cathedral for the Royal School of Church Music.

In 2004, he began recording the complete keyboard works of Scarlatti, subsequently released by Nimbus Records. The series was recorded with engineer, Raymond Fenton. The Scarlatti series was followed by recordings of Haydn and Mozart piano works on fortepiano, harpsichord works by Soler and Seixas, and a five disc set of harpsichord and organ music by Girolamo Frescobaldi, the latter included in the 2012 Penguin Guide to the 1000 Finest Classical Recordings. The Frescobaldi recording also received the "outstanding" accolade in International Record Review.

Lester is the author of several articles including sixteenth century Italian fingering methods, and another on Frescobaldi for Harpsichord and Fortepiano magazine. In 2013 he participated in International Piano Magazine's Scarlatti symposium with Peter Katin, Nikolai Demidenko, Yevgeny Sudbyn, and Andreas Staier Since 2009, Lester has devoted his attention to recording 16th century Italian keyboard music for Nimbus.

== Recordings ==
- Scarlatti sonatas (complete) NI 1725 - 1731
- Soler and Seixas sonatas NI 5836
- Soler sonatas and Boccherini Fandango NI 5906
- Frescobaldi Keyboard works NI 5850
- Mozart sonatas NI 5867
- Haydn sonatas NI 5847
- Sixteenth century Italian organ masses by Cavazzoni, Andrea Gabrieli and Claudio Merulo. Vol 1 NI 5909/11

== Personal life ==
Richard Lester married Jacqueline Susanna Woolford in 1981. The couple have two children. He also has a son from his first marriage.
