= List of Nova episodes =

Nova is an American science documentary television series produced by WGBH Boston for PBS. Many of the programs in this list were not originally produced for PBS, but were acquired from other sources such as the BBC. All acquired programs are edited for Nova, if only to provide American English narration and additional voice of interpreters (translating from another language). Most of the episodes aired in a 60-minute time slot.

In 2005, Nova began airing some episodes titled NOVA scienceNOW, which followed a newsmagazine style format. For two seasons, NOVA scienceNOW episodes aired in the same time slot as Nova. In 2008, NOVA scienceNOW was officially declared its own series and given its own time slot. Therefore, NOVA scienceNOW episodes are not included in this list.

== Series overview ==
| Season | Episodes | Originally released | |
| Season | Episodes | First released | Last released |
|---|---|---|---|
| 1 | 13 | March 3, 1974 | May 26, 1974 |
| 2 | 17 | November 3, 1974 | April 6, 1975 |
| 3 | 20 | January 4, 1976 | June 27, 1976 |
| 4 | 19 | January 5, 1977 | June 29, 1977 |
| 5 | 21 | January 4, 1978 | June 28, 1978 |
| 6 | 10 | January 4, 1979 | March 29, 1979 |
| 7 | 17 | October 2, 1979 | March 25, 1980 |
| 8 | 22 | September 30, 1980 | August 25, 1981 |
| 9 | 20 | September 27, 1981 | March 28, 1982 |
| 10 | 16 | October 12, 1982 | March 29, 1983 |
| 11 | 21 | October 11, 1983 | April 3, 1984 |
| 12 | 22 | October 2, 1984 | March 19, 1985 |
| 13 | 21 | October 8, 1985 | April 22, 1986 |
| 14 | 21 | October 14, 1986 | April 7, 1987 |
| 15 | 21 | October 6, 1987 | April 5, 1988 |
| 16 | 21 | September 6, 1988 | March 28, 1989 |
| 17 | 19 | October 3, 1989 | April 10, 1990 |
| 18 | 21 | October 2, 1990 | March 26, 1991 |
| 19 | 18 | October 1, 1991 | March 24, 1992 |
| 20 | 20 | August 25, 1992 | March 30, 1993 |
| 21 | 21 | October 5, 1993 | April 19, 1994 |
| 22 | 23 | October 11, 1994 | May 23, 1995 |
| 23 | 19 | October 10, 1995 | April 16, 1996 |
| 24 | 20 | October 1, 1996 | April 15, 1997 |
| 25 | 19 | October 7, 1997 | May 12, 1998 |
| 26 | 20 | October 6, 1998 | July 13, 1999 |
| 27 | 22 | October 5, 1999 | May 9, 2000 |
| 28 | 17 | October 24, 2000 | April 24, 2001 |
| 29 | 17 | October 2, 2001 | May 7, 2002 |
| 30 | 16 | September 3, 2002 | April 15, 2003 |
| 31 | 17 | September 30, 2003 | May 4, 2004 |
| 32 | 15 | September 28, 2004 | March 29, 2005 |
| 33 | 16 | September 20, 2005 | April 18, 2006 |
| 34 | 15 | September 5, 2006 | June 26, 2007 |
| 35 | 17 | October 9, 2007 | May 20, 2008 |
| 36 | 17 | October 7, 2008 | June 30, 2009 |
| 37 | 18 | October 6, 2009 | May 4, 2010 |
| 38 | 17 | October 19, 2010 | April 20, 2011 |
| 39 | 19 | September 7, 2011 | April 25, 2012 |
| 40 | 20 | October 10, 2012 | May 29, 2013 |
| 41 | 22 | September 11, 2013 | May 28, 2014 |
| 42 | 22 | September 10, 2014 | July 29, 2015 |
| 43 | 22 | September 16, 2015 | May 11, 2016 |
| 44 | 18 | September 7, 2016 | May 31, 2017 |
| 45 | 24 | August 21, 2017 | June 27, 2018 |
| 46 | 33 | September 26, 2018 | November 27, 2019 |
| 47 | 16 | February 5, 2020 | November 25, 2020 |
| 48 | 21 | January 13, 2021 | November 24, 2021 |
| 49 | 22 | January 5, 2022 | December 14, 2022 |
| 50 | 18 | February 1, 2023 | November 22, 2023 |
| 51 | 21 | January 31, 2024 | December 18, 2024 |
| 52 | 20 | January 22, 2025 | November 12, 2025 |
| 53 | 17 | January 21, 2026 | April 29, 2026 |

== Episodes ==
=== Seasons 1–20 ===
1 • 2 • 3 • 4 • 5 • 6 • 7 • 8 • 9 • 10 • 11 • 12 • 13 • 14 • 15 • 16 • 17 • 18 • 19 • 20

=== Season 1: 1974 ===
| No. overall | No. in season | Title | Original release date | Prod. code |
|---|---|---|---|---|
| 1 | 1 | "The Making of a Natural History Film" | March 3, 1974 | 0101 |
| 2 | 2 | "Where Did the Colorado Go?" | March 10, 1974 | 0102 |
| 3 | 3 | "Whales, Dolphins, and Men" | March 17, 1974 | 0103 |
| 4 | 4 | "The Search for Life" | March 24, 1974 | 0104 |
| 5 | 5 | "Last of the Cuiva" | March 31, 1974 | 0105 |
| 6 | 6 | "Strange Sleep" | April 7, 1974 | 0106 |
| 7 | 7 | "The Crab Nebula" | April 14, 1974 | 0107 |
| 8 | 8 | "Bird Brain: The Mystery of Bird Navigation" | April 21, 1974 | 0108 |
| 9 | 9 | "Are You Doing This for Me, Doctor?" | April 28, 1974 | 0109 |
| 10 | 10 | "The First Signs of Washoe" | May 5, 1974 | 0110 |
| 11 | 11 | "The Case of the Midwife Toad" | May 12, 1974 | 0111 |
| 12 | 12 | "Fusion: The Energy Promise" | May 19, 1974 | 0112 |
| 13 | 13 | "The Mystery of the Anasazi" | May 26, 1974 | 0113 |

=== Season 2: 1974–75 ===
| No. overall | No. in season | Title | Original release date | Prod. code |
|---|---|---|---|---|
| 14 | 1 | "Why Do Birds Sing?" | November 3, 1974 | 0201 |
| 15 | 2 | "How Much Do You Smell?" | November 10, 1974 | 0202 |
| 16 | 3 | "The Hunting of the Quark" | November 17, 1974 | 0203 |
| 17 | 4 | "The Secrets of Sleep" | November 24, 1974 | 0204 |
| 18 | 5 | "Inside the Golden Gate" | December 1, 1974 | 0205 |
| 19 | 6 | "The Men Who Painted Caves" | December 8, 1974 | 0206 |
| 20 | 7 | "Red Sea Coral" | December 15, 1974 | 0207 |
| 21 | 8 | "War From the Air" | January 5, 1975 | 0208 |
| 22 | 9 | "What Time is Your Body?" | January 12, 1975 | 0209 |
| 23 | 10 | "The Rise and Fall of DDT" | January 19, 1975 | 0210 |
| 24 | 11 | "Take the World From Another Point of View" | February 2, 1975 | 0211 |
| 25 | 12 | "The Lysenko Affair" | February 9, 1975 | 0212 |
| 26 | 13 | "The Tuaregs" | February 16, 1975 | 0213 |
| 27 | 14 | "The Plutonium Connection" | March 9, 1975 | 0214 |
| 28 | 15 | "The Other Way" | March 16, 1975 | 0215 |
| 29 | 16 | "The Lost World of the Maya" | March 30, 1975 | 0216 |
| 30 | 17 | "Will The Fishing Have to Stop?" | April 6, 1975 | 0217 |

=== Season 3: 1976 ===
| No. overall | No. in season | Title | Original release date | Prod. code |
|---|---|---|---|---|
| 31 | 1 | "Predictable Disaster" | January 4, 1976 | 0301 |
| 32 | 2 | "Joey" | January 11, 1976 | 0302 |
| 33 | 3 | "Meditation and the Mind" | January 18, 1976 | 0303 |
| 34 | 4 | "The Planets" | January 25, 1976 | 0304 |
| 35 | 5 | "A Desert Place" | February 1, 1976 | 0305 |
| 36 | 6 | "A Small Imperfection" | February 8, 1976 | 0306 |
| 37 | 7 | "Ninety Degrees Below" | February 15, 1976 | 0307 |
| 38 | 8 | "The Race for the Double Helix" | March 7, 1976 | 0308 |
| 39 | 9 | "The Renewable Tree" | March 7, 1976 | 0309 |
| 40 | 10 | "The Williamsburg File" | March 14, 1976 | 0310 |
| 41 | 11 | "The Overworked Miracle" | March 21, 1976 | 0311 |
| 42 | 12 | "The Transplant Experience" | April 11, 1976 | 0312 |
| 43 | 13 | "The Underground Movement" | April 18, 1976 | 0313 |
| 44 | 14 | "Hunters of the Seal" | May 2, 1976 | 0314 |
| 45 | 15 | "Benjamin" | May 9, 1976 | 0315 |
| 46 | 16 | "The Women Rebel" | May 23, 1976 | 0316 |
| 47 | 17 | "Death of a Disease" | June 6, 1976 | 0317 |
| 48 | 18 | "Inside the Shark" | June 13, 1976 | 0318 |
| 49 | 19 | "The Genetic Chance" | June 20, 1976 | 0319 |
| 50 | 20 | "The Case of the Bermuda Triangle" | June 27, 1976 | 0320 |

=== Season 4: 1977 ===
| No. overall | No. in season | Title | Original release date | Prod. code |
|---|---|---|---|---|
| 51 | 1 | "Hitler's Secret Weapon" | January 5, 1977 | 0401 |
| 52 | 2 | "The Hot Blooded Dinosaurs" | January 12, 1977 | 0402 |
| 53 | 3 | "What Price Coal?" | January 19, 1977 | 0403 |
| 54 | 4 | "The Sunspot Mystery" | February 2, 1977 | 0404 |
| 55 | 5 | "The Plastic Prison" | February 9, 1977 | 0405 |
| 56 | 6 | "Incident at Brown's Ferry" | February 23, 1977 | 0406 |
| 57 | 7 | "Bye Bye Blackbird" | March 2, 1977 | 0407 |
| 58 | 8 | "The Pill for the People" | March 9, 1977 | 0408 |
| 59 | 9 | "The Gene Engineers" | March 16, 1977 | 0409 |
| 60 | 10 | "The Human Animal" | March 23, 1977 | 0410 |
| 61 | 11 | "The Wolf Equation" | March 30, 1977 | 0411 |
| 62 | 12 | "The Dawn of the Solar Age" | April 20, 1977 | 0412 |
| 63 | 13 | "The Business of Extinction" | April 20, 1977 | 0413 |
| 64 | 14 | "The Red Planet" | April 27, 1977 | 0414 |
| 65 | 15 | "Tongues of Men: Disaster at Babel" (1 of 2) | May 11, 1977 | 0415 |
| 66 | 16 | "Tongues of Men: A World Language?" (2 of 2) | May 18, 1977 | 0416 |
| 67 | 17 | "Linus Pauling: Crusading Scientist" | June 1, 1977 | 0417 |
| 68 | 18 | "Across the Silent Barrier" | June 22, 1977 | 0418 |
| 69 | 19 | "The New Healers" | June 29, 1977 | 0419 |

=== Season 5: 1978 ===
| No. overall | No. in season | Title | Original release date | Prod. code |
|---|---|---|---|---|
| 70 | 1 | "In The Event of Catastrophe" | January 4, 1978 | 0501 |
| 71 | 2 | "The Green Machine" | January 11, 1978 | 0420 |
| 72 | 3 | "Blueprints in the Bloodstream" | January 18, 1978 | 0502 |
| 73 | 4 | "One Small Step" | January 25, 1978 | 0503 |
| 74 | 5 | "The Final Frontier" | February 1, 1978 | 0504 |
| 75 | 6 | "BaMiki BaNdula: Children of the Forest" | February 15, 1978 | 0505 |
| 76 | 7 | "Trial of Denton Cooley" | February 22, 1978 | 0506 |
| 77 | 8 | "The Great Wine Revolution" | March 1, 1978 | 0507 |
| 78 | 9 | "The Case of the Ancient Astronauts" | March 8, 1978 | 0508 |
| 79 | 10 | "The Mind Machines" | March 22, 1978 | 0509 |
| 80 | 11 | "Icarus' Children" | March 29, 1978 | 0510 |
| 81 | 12 | "Still Waters" | April 12, 1978 | 0511 |
| 82 | 13 | "Battle for the Acropolis" | April 19, 1978 | 0512 |
| 83 | 14 | "The Road to Happiness" | May 3, 1978 | 0513 |
| 84 | 15 | "Light of the 21st Century" | May 10, 1978 | 0514 |
| 85 | 16 | "The Insect Alternative" | May 24, 1978 | 0515 |
| 86 | 17 | "The Desert's Edge" | May 31, 1978 | 0516 |
| 87 | 18 | "The Tsetse Trap" | June 7, 1978 | 0517 |
| 88 | 19 | "Memories From Eden" | June 14, 1978 | 0518 |
| 89 | 20 | "A Whisper From Space" | June 21, 1978 | 0519 |
| 90 | 21 | "Alaska: The Closing Frontier" | June 28, 1978 | 0520 |

=== Season 6: 1979 ===
| No. overall | No. in season | Title | Original release date | Prod. code |
|---|---|---|---|---|
| 91 | 1 | "Black Tide" | January 4, 1979 | 0601 |
| 92 | 2 | "Long Walk of Fred Young" | January 11, 1979 | 0602 |
| 93 | 3 | "A World of Difference" | January 18, 1979 | 0603 |
| 94 | 4 | "Cashing In On The Ocean" | February 1, 1979 | 0604 |
| 95 | 5 | "Patterns from the Past" | February 8, 1979 | 0605 |
| 96 | 6 | "The Invisible Flame" | February 22, 1979 | 0606 |
| 97 | 7 | "The End of the Rainbow" | March 1, 1979 | 0607 |
| 98 | 8 | "The Beersheva Experiment" | March 8, 1979 | 0608 |
| 99 | 9 | "Einstein" | March 15, 1979 | 0609 |
| 100 | 10 | "The Keys of Paradise" | March 29, 1979 | 0610 |

=== Season 7: 1979–1980 ===
| No. overall | No. in season | Title | Original release date | Prod. code |
|---|---|---|---|---|
| 101 | 1 | "A Plague on our Children" | October 2, 1979 | 0611 |
| 102 | 2 | "Life on a Silken Thread" | October 9, 1979 | 0612 |
| 103 | 3 | "Sweet Solutions" | October 16, 1979 | 0613 |
| 104 | 4 | "Race For Gold" | October 30, 1979 | 0614 |
| 105 | 5 | "All Part of The Game" | November 6, 1979 | 0615 |
| 106 | 6 | "India: Machinery of Hope" | November 20, 1979 | 0616 |
| 107 | 7 | "The Bridge That Spanned The World" | December 4, 1979 | 0617 |
| 108 | 8 | "Termites and Telescopes" | December 11, 1979 | 0618 |
| 109 | 9 | "Blindness: Five Points of View" | December 18, 1979 | 0619 |
| 110 | 10 | "The Elusive Illness" | January 15, 1980 | 0701 |
| 111 | 11 | "A is for Atom, B is for Bomb" | January 22, 1980 | 0702 |
| 112 | 12 | "Living Machines" | February 5, 1980 | 0703 |
| 113 | 13 | "Portrait of a Killer" | February 19, 1980 | 0704 |
| 114 | 14 | "Umealit: The Whale Hunters" | March 4, 1980 | 0705 |
| 115 | 15 | "The Safety Factor" | March 11, 1980 | 0706 |
| 116 | 16 | "A Mediterranean Prospect" | March 18, 1980 | 0707 |
| 117 | 17 | "Mr. Ludwig's Tropical Dreamland" | March 25, 1980 | 0708 |

=== Season 8: 1980–81 ===
| No. overall | No. in season | Title | Original release date | Prod. code |
|---|---|---|---|---|
| 118 | 1 | "The Pinks and the Blues" | September 30, 1980 | 0709 |
| 119 | 2 | "The Cancer Detectives of Lin Xian" | October 7, 1980 | 0710 |
| 120 | 3 | "The Sea Behind the Dunes" | October 14, 1980 | 0711 |
| 121 | 4 | "Do We Really Need The Rockies?" | October 28, 1980 | 0712 |
| 122 | 5 | "The Big IF" | November 4, 1980 | 0713 |
| 123 | 6 | "Voyager: Jupiter & Beyond" | November 11, 1980 | 0714 |
| 124 | 7 | "The Wizard Who Spat On The Floor" | November 18, 1980 | 0715 |
| 125 | 8 | "The Water Crisis" | November 25, 1980 | 0716 |
| 126 | 9 | "Moving Still" | December 2, 1980 | 0717 |
| 127 | 10 | "A Touch of Sensitivity" | December 9, 1980 | 0718 |
| 128 | 11 | "Red Deer of Rhum" | December 23, 1980 | 0719 |
| 129 | 12 | "It's About Time" | December 30, 1980 | 0720 |
| 130 | 13 | "The Doctors of Nigeria" | January 6, 1981 | 0801 |
| 131 | 14 | "Message In The Rocks" | January 20, 1981 | 0802 |
| 132 | 15 | "The Dead Sea Lives" | January 27, 1981 | 0803 |
| 133 | 16 | "Anatomy of a Volcano" | February 10, 1981 | 0804 |
| 134 | 17 | "The Science of Murder" | February 17, 1981 | 0805 |
| 135 | 18 | "The Malady of Health Care" | February 24, 1981 | 0806 |
| 136 | 19 | "Beyond the Milky Way" | March 3, 1981 | 0807 |
| 137 | 20 | "The Asteroid and the Dinosaur" | March 10, 1981 | 0808 |
| 138 | 21 | "Animal Olympians" | March 17, 1981 | 0809 |
| 139 | 22 | "Resolution on Saturn" | August 25, 1981 | 0810 |

=== Season 9: 1981–82 ===
| No. overall | No. in season | Title | Original release date | Prod. code |
|---|---|---|---|---|
| 140 | 1 | "Computers, Spies, & Private Lives" | September 27, 1981 | 0811 |
| 141 | 2 | "Why America Burns" | October 4, 1981 | 0812 |
| 142 | 3 | "The Great Violin Mystery" | October 11, 1981 | 0813 |
| 143 | 4 | "Cosmic Fire" | October 18, 1981 | 0814 |
| 144 | 5 | "Locusts: "War Without End"" | October 25, 1981 | 0815 |
| 145 | 6 | "Did Darwin Get It Wrong?" | November 1, 1981 | 0816 |
| 146 | 7 | "Artists in the Lab" | November 15, 1981 | 0817 |
| 147 | 8 | "Notes of a Biology Watcher: A Film with Lewis Thomas" | November 22, 1981 | 0818 |
| 148 | 9 | "City Spaces, Human Places" | November 29, 1981 | 0819 |
| 149 | 10 | "Twins" | December 6, 1981 | 0820 |
| 150 | 11 | "Salmon on the Run" | January 10, 1982 | 0901 |
| 151 | 12 | "Test-Tube Babies: A Daughter For Judy" | January 17, 1982 | 0902 |
| 152 | 13 | "A Field Guide to Roger Tory Peterson" | January 24, 1982 | 0903 |
| 153 | 14 | "The Hunt for the Legion Killer" | January 31, 1982 | 0904 |
| 154 | 15 | "Finding a Voice" | February 7, 1982 | 0905 |
| 155 | 16 | "The Television Explosion" | February 14, 1982 | 0906 |
| 156 | 17 | "Life: Patent Pending" | February 28, 1982 | 0907 |
| 157 | 18 | "Palace of Delights" | March 7, 1982 | 0908 |
| 158 | 19 | "Animal Impostors" | March 14, 1982 | 0909 |
| 159 | 20 | "Aging: The Methuselah Syndrome" | March 28, 1982 | 0910 |

=== Season 10: 1982–83 ===
- For the week of January 4, 1983 to celebrate its 10th broadcast season, NOVA reaired its very first program "The Making of a Natural History Film" (which originally aired on March 3, 1974).

| No. overall | No. in season | Title | Original release date | Prod. code |
|---|---|---|---|---|
| 160 | 1 | "The Case of the UFOs" | October 12, 1982 | 0911 |
| 161 | 2 | "The Fragile Mountain" | October 19, 1982 | 0912 |
| 162 | 3 | "Here's Looking At You, Kid" | November 9, 1982 | 0913 |
| 163 | 4 | "Adventures of Teenage Scientists" | November 16, 1982 | 0914 |
| 164 | 5 | "The Cobalt Blues" | November 23, 1982 | 0915 |
| 165 | 6 | "Goodbye Louisiana" | November 30, 1982 | 0916 |
| 166 | 7 | "Whale Watch" | December 7, 1982 | 0917 |
| 167 | 8 | "Tracking The Supertrains" | December 14, 1982 | 0918 |
| 168 | 9 | "Hawaii: Crucible of Life" | January 18, 1983 | 1001 |
| 169 | 10 | "The Pleasure of Finding Things Out" | January 25, 1983 | 1002 |
| 170 | 11 | "Lassa Fever" | February 8, 1983 | 1003 |
| 171 | 12 | "The Miracle of Life" | February 15, 1983 | 1004 |
| 172 | 13 | "Asbestos: A Lethal Legacy" | March 1, 1983 | 1005 |
| 173 | 14 | "City of Coral" | March 8, 1983 | 1006 |
| 174 | 15 | "Fat Chance in a Thin World" | March 22, 1983 | 1007 |
| 175 | 16 | "Sixty Minutes to Meltdown" | March 29, 1983 | 1008 |

=== Season 11: 1983–84 ===
| No. overall | No. in season | Title | Original release date | Prod. code |
|---|---|---|---|---|
| 176 | 1 | "Signs of the Apes, Songs of the Whales" | October 11, 1983 | 1009 |
| 177 | 2 | "The Artificial Heart" | October 18, 1983 | 1010 |
| 178 | 3 | "Talking Turtle" | October 25, 1983 | 1011 |
| 179 | 4 | "Papua New Guinea: Anthropology on Trial" | November 1, 1983 | 1012 |
| 180 | 5 | "To Live Until You Die: The Work of Elisabeth Kübler-Ross" | November 8, 1983 | 1013 |
| 181 | 6 | "A Magic Way of Going: The Story of Thoroughbreds" | November 15, 1983 | 1014 |
| 182 | 7 | "A Normal Face: The Wonders of Plastic Surgery" | November 22, 1983 | 1015 |
| 183 | 8 | "Captives of Care" | November 29, 1983 | 1016 |
| 184 | 9 | "Twenty-Five Years in Space" | December 6, 1983 | 1017 |
| 185 | 10 | "Nuclear Strategy for Beginners" | December 13, 1983 | 1018 |
| 186 | 11 | "The Climate Crisis" | December 20, 1983 | 1019 |
| 187 | 12 | "Eyes Over China" | December 27, 1983 | 1020 |
| 188 | 13 | "Alcoholism: Life Under The Influence" | January 10, 1984 | 1021 |
| 189 | 14 | "The Case of ESP" | January 17, 1984 | 1101 |
| 190 | 15 | "Antarctica: Earth's Last Frontier" | January 31, 1984 | 1102 |
| 191 | 16 | "China's Only Child" | February 14, 1984 | 1103 |
| 192 | 17 | "Will I Walk Again?" | February 28, 1984 | 1104 |
| 193 | 18 | "Visions of the Deep: The Underwater World of Al Giddings" | March 6, 1984 | 1105 |
| 194 | 19 | "Down on the Farm" | March 20, 1984 | 1106 |
| 195 | 20 | "Make My People Live: The Crisis in Indian Health Care" | March 27, 1984 | 1107 |
| 196 | 21 | "The World According to Weisskopf" | April 3, 1984 | 1108 |

=== Season 12: 1984–85 ===
| No. overall | No. in season | Title | Original release date | Prod. code |
|---|---|---|---|---|
| 197 | 1 | "Space Bridge to Moscow" | October 2, 1984 | 1120 |
| 198 | 2 | "The National Science Test I" | October 16, 1984 | 1109 |
| 199 | 3 | "Fountains of Paradise" | October 23, 1984 | 1110 |
| 200 | 4 | "The Mystery of Yellow Rain" | October 30, 1984 | 1111 |
| 201 | 5 | "The Nomads of the Rain Forest" | November 6, 1984 | 1112 |
| 202 | 6 | "Farmers of the Sea" | November 13, 1984 | 1113 |
| 203 | 7 | "Frontiers of Plastic Surgery" | November 20, 1984 | 1114 |
| 204 | 8 | "Space Women" | November 27, 1984 | 1115 |
| 205 | 9 | "Jaws: The True Story" | December 4, 1984 | 1116 |
| 206 | 10 | "Acid Rain: New Bad News" | December 11, 1984 | 1117 |
| 207 | 11 | "Stephen Jay Gould: This View of Life" | December 18, 1984 | 1118 |
| 208 | 12 | "The Garden of Inheritance" | January 8, 1985 | 1119 |
| 209 | 13 | "Edgerton and His Incredible Seeing Machines" | January 15, 1985 | 1201 |
| 210 | 14 | "Global Village" | January 22, 1985 | 1202 |
| 211 | 15 | "Conquest of the Parasites" | January 29, 1985 | 1203 |
| 212 | 16 | "In the Land of the Polar Bears" | February 5, 1985 | 1204 |
| 213 | 17 | "AIDS: Chapter One" | February 12, 1985 | 1205 |
| 214 | 18 | "The Shape of Things" | February 19, 1985 | 1206 |
| 215 | 19 | "Baby Talk" | February 26, 1985 | 1207 |
| 216 | 20 | "A Mathematical Mystery Tour" | March 5, 1985 | 1208 |
| 217 | 21 | "Child's Play: Prodigies and Possibilities" | March 12, 1985 | 1209 |
| 218 | 22 | "Monarch of the Mountains" | March 19, 1985 | 1210 |

=== Season 13: 1985–86 ===
| No. overall | No. in season | Title | Original release date | Prod. code |
|---|---|---|---|---|
| 219 | 1 | "The National Science Test II" | October 8, 1985 | 1211 |
| 220 | 2 | "Seeds of Tomorrow" | October 15, 1985 | 1212 |
| 221 | 3 | "What Einstein Never Knew" | October 22, 1985 | 1213 |
| 222 | 4 | "The Robot Revolution?" | October 29, 1985 | 1214 |
| 223 | 5 | "The Magic of Special Effects" | November 5, 1985 | 1215 |
| 224 | 6 | "Child Survival: The Silent Emergency" | November 12, 1985 | 1216 |
| 225 | 7 | "Tornado!" | November 19, 1985 | 1217 |
| 226 | 8 | "The Genetic Gamble" | November 26, 1985 | 1218 |
| 227 | 9 | "Animal Architects" | December 3, 1985 | 1219 |
| 228 | 10 | "The Plane that Changed the World" | December 17, 1985 | 1220 |
| 229 | 11 | "Halley's Comet: Once in a Lifetime" | January 21, 1986 | 1301 |
| 230 | 12 | "Goddess of the Earth" | January 28, 1986 | 1302 |
| 231 | 13 | "Horsemen of China" | February 4, 1986 | 1303 |
| 232 | 14 | "Life's First Feelings" | February 11, 1986 | 1304 |
| 233 | 15 | "The Case of the Frozen Addict" | February 18, 1986 | 1305 |
| 234 | 16 | "Toxic Trials" | February 25, 1986 | 1306 |
| 235 | 17 | "Skydive to the Rain Forest" | March 4, 1986 | 1307 |
| 236 | 18 | "Return of the Osprey" | March 11, 1986 | 1308 |
| 237 | 19 | "The Rise of a Wonder Drug" | March 18, 1986 | 1309 |
| 238 | 20 | "When Wonder Drugs Don't Work" | March 25, 1986 | 1310 |
| 239 | 21 | "Visions of 'Star Wars'" | April 22, 1986 | TBA |

=== Season 14: 1986–87 ===
| No. overall | No. in season | Title | Original release date | Prod. code |
|---|---|---|---|---|
| 240 | 1 | "The Search for the Disappeared" | October 14, 1986 | 1311 |
| 241 | 2 | "The Planet that Got Knocked on its Side" | October 21, 1986 | 1312 |
| 242 | 3 | "High-Tech Babies" | November 4, 1986 | 1313 |
| 243 | 4 | "Can AIDS Be Stopped?" | November 11, 1986 | 1314 |
| 244 | 5 | "Is Anybody Out There?" | November 18, 1986 | 1315 |
| 245 | 6 | "The Mystery of the Animal Pathfinders" | November 25, 1986 | 1316 |
| 246 | 7 | "Are You Swimming in a Sewer?" | December 2, 1986 | 1317 |
| 247 | 8 | "Sail Wars!" | December 9, 1986 | 1318 |
| 248 | 9 | "Leprosy Can Be Cured!" | December 16, 1986 | 1319 |
| 249 | 10 | "How Babies Get Made" | January 13, 1987 | 1320 |
| 250 | 11 | "Countdown to the Invisible Universe" | January 20, 1987 | 1401 |
| 251 | 12 | "Children of Eve" | January 27, 1987 | 1402 |
| 252 | 13 | "Why Planes Crash" | February 3, 1987 | 1403 |
| 253 | 14 | "Orangutans of the Rainforest" | February 10, 1987 | 1404 |
| 254 | 15 | "Freud Under Analysis" | February 17, 1987 | 1405 |
| 255 | 16 | "The Hole in the Sky" | February 24, 1987 | 1406 |
| 256 | 17 | "Confessions of a Weaponeer" | March 3, 1987 | 1407 |
| 257 | 18 | "Great Moments from NOVA" | March 10, 1987 | Special |
| 258 | 19 | "Will the World Starve?" | March 24, 1987 | 1408 |
| 259 | 20 | "The Desert Doesn't Bloom Here Anymore" | March 31, 1987 | 1409 |
| 260 | 21 | "Rocky Road to Jupiter" | April 7, 1987 | 1410 |

=== Season 15: 1987–88 ===
| No. overall | No. in season | Title | Original release date | Prod. code |
|---|---|---|---|---|
| 261 | 1 | "Death of a Star" | October 6, 1987 | 1411 |
| 262 | 2 | "Spy Machines" | October 13, 1987 | 1412 |
| 263 | 3 | "The Hidden Power of Plants" | October 20, 1987 | 1413 |
| 264 | 4 | "Japan's American Genius" | October 27, 1987 | 1414 |
| 265 | 5 | "A Man, A Plan, A Canal, Panama" | November 3, 1987 | 1415 |
| 266 | 6 | "Volcano!" | November 10, 1987 | 1416 |
| 267 | 7 | "How Good is Soviet Science?" | November 17, 1987 | 1417 |
| 268 | 8 | "Ancient Treasures from the Deep" | December 1, 1987 | 1418 |
| 269 | 9 | "Riddle of the Joints" | December 8, 1987 | 1419 |
| 270 | 10 | "Secrets of the Lost Red Paint People" | December 15, 1987 | 1420 |
| 271 | 11 | "Top Gun and Beyond" | January 19, 1988 | 1501 |
| 272 | 12 | "How to Create a Junk Food" | January 26, 1988 | 1502 |
| 273 | 13 | "Buried in Ice" | February 2, 1988 | 1503 |
| 274 | 14 | "Why Planes Burn" | February 9, 1988 | 1504 |
| 275 | 15 | "Battles in the War on Cancer: A Wonder Drug on Trial" | February 23, 1988 | 1505 |
| 276 | 16 | "Battles in the War on Cancer: Breast Cancer – Turning the Tide" | March 1, 1988 | 1506 |
| 277 | 17 | "The Mystery of the Master Builders" | March 8, 1988 | 1507 |
| 278 | 18 | "Whale Rescue" | March 15, 1988 | 1508 |
| 279 | 19 | "The Man Who Loved Numbers" | March 22, 1988 | 1509 |
| 280 | 20 | "Race for the Superconductor" | March 29, 1988 | 1510 |
| 281 | 21 | "Can You Still Get Polio?" | April 5, 1988 | 1511 |

=== Season 16: 1988–89 ===
| No. overall | No. in season | Title | Original release date | Prod. code |
|---|---|---|---|---|
| 282 | 1 | "Pioneers of Surgery: The Brutal Craft" | September 6, 1988 | 1512 |
| 283 | 2 | "Pioneers of Surgery: Into the Heart" | September 13, 1988 | 1513 |
| 284 | 3 | "Pioneers of Surgery: New Organs for Old" | September 20, 1988 | 1514 |
| 285 | 4 | "Pioneers of Surgery: Beyond the Knife" | September 27, 1988 | 1515 |
| 286 | 5 | "Can the Vatican Save the Sistine Chapel?" | October 4, 1988 | 1516 |
| 287 | 6 | "Can the Next President Win the Space Race?" | October 11, 1988 | 1517 |
| 288 | 7 | "Do Scientists Cheat?" | October 25, 1988 | 1518 |
| 289 | 8 | "Who Shot President Kennedy?" | November 15, 1988 | 1519 |
| 290 | 9 | "The Light Stuff" | November 22, 1988 | 1520 |
| 291 | 10 | "The All-American Bear" | December 6, 1988 | 1521 |
| 292 | 11 | "Can We Make a Better Doctor?" | December 13, 1988 | 1522 |
| 293 | 12 | "Hot Enough for You?" | January 17, 1989 | 1601 |
| 294 | 13 | "The Last Journey of a Genius" | January 24, 1989 | 1602 |
| 295 | 14 | "The Strange New Science of Chaos" | January 31, 1989 | 1603 |
| 296 | 15 | "Back to Chernobyl" | February 14, 1989 | 1604 |
| 297 | 16 | "God, Darwin and Dinosaurs" | February 21, 1989 | 1605 |
| 298 | 17 | "Adrift on the Gulf Stream" | February 28, 1989 | 1606 |
| 299 | 18 | "Secrets of Easter Island" | March 7, 1989 | 1607 |
| 300 | 19 | "Legends of Easter Island" | March 14, 1989 | 1608 |
| 301 | 20 | "The World Is Full of Oil!" | March 21, 1989 | 1609 |
| 302 | 21 | "Confronting the Killer Gene" | March 28, 1989 | 1610 |

=== Season 17: 1989–1990 ===
| No. overall | No. in season | Title | Original release date | Prod. code |
|---|---|---|---|---|
| 303 | 1 | "The Hidden City" | October 3, 1989 | 1611 |
| 304 | 2 | "The Controversial Dr. Koop" | October 10, 1989 | 1612 |
| 305 | 3 | "Design Wars!" | October 17, 1989 | 1613 |
| 306 | 4 | "Echoes of War" | October 24, 1989 | 1614 |
| 307 | 5 | "Decoding the Book of Life" | October 31, 1989 | 1615 |
| 308 | 6 | "Hurricane!" | November 7, 1989 | 1616 |
| 309 | 7 | "Will Venice Survive Its Rescue?" | November 14, 1989 | 1617 |
| 310 | 8 | "What Is Music?" | November 21, 1989 | 1618 |
| 311 | 9 | "Yellowstone's Burning Question" | December 5, 1989 | 1619 |
| 312 | 10 | "The Schoolboys Who Cracked the Soviet Secret" | December 12, 1989 | 1620 |
| 313 | 11 | "Poison in the Rockies" | January 9, 1990 | 1701 |
| 314 | 12 | "Race for the Top" | January 23, 1990 | 1702 |
| 315 | 13 | "Disguises of War" | February 6, 1990 | 1703 |
| 316 | 14 | "The Bomb's Lethal Legacy" | February 13, 1990 | 1704 |
| 317 | 15 | "The Big Spill" | February 27, 1990 | 1705 |
| 318 | 16 | "The Genius That Was China: Rise of the Dragon" | March 20, 1990 | 1706 |
| 319 | 17 | "The Genius That Was China: Empires in Collision" | March 27, 1990 | 1707 |
| 320 | 18 | "The Genius That Was China: The Threat from Japan" | April 3, 1990 | 1708 |
| 321 | 19 | "The Genius That Was China: Will the Dragon Rise Again?" | April 10, 1990 | 1709 |

=== Season 18: 1990–91 ===
| No. overall | No. in season | Title | Original release date | Prod. code |
|---|---|---|---|---|
| 322 | 1 | "The KGB, The Computer and Me" | October 2, 1990 | 1710 |
| 323 | 2 | "Neptune's Cold Fury" | October 9, 1990 | 1711 |
| 324 | 3 | "To Boldly Go..." | October 16, 1990 | 1712 |
| 325 | 4 | "Poisoned Winds of War" | October 23, 1990 | 1713 |
| 326 | 5 | "The Blimp is Back!" | October 30, 1990 | 1714 |
| 327 | 6 | "Earthquake!" | November 6, 1990 | 1715 |
| 328 | 7 | "Killing Machines" | November 13, 1990 | 1716 |
| 329 | 8 | "Can the Elephant Be Saved?" | November 20, 1990 | 1717 |
| 330 | 9 | "We Know Where You Live" | November 27, 1990 | 1718 |
| 331 | 10 | "In the Land of the Llamas" | December 4, 1990 | 1719 |
| 332 | 11 | "What's Killing the Children?" | December 18, 1990 | 1720 |
| 333 | 12 | "Return to Mt. St. Helens" | January 8, 1991 | 1801 |
| 334 | 13 | "ConFusion in a Jar" | January 15, 1991 | 1802 |
| 335 | 14 | "The Hunt for China's Dinosaurs" | February 5, 1991 | 1803 |
| 336 | 15 | "Case of the Flying Dinosaur" | February 12, 1991 | 1804 |
| 337 | 16 | "T. Rex Exposed" | February 19, 1991 | 1805 |
| 338 | 17 | "Russian Right Stuff: The Invisible Spaceman" | February 26, 1991 | 1806 |
| 339 | 18 | "Russian Right Stuff: The Dark Side of the Moon" | February 27, 1991 | 1807 |
| 340 | 19 | "Russian Right Stuff: The Mission" | February 28, 1991 | 1808 |
| 341 | 20 | "Swimming With Whales" | March 5, 1991 | 1809 |
| 342 | 21 | "The Chip vs. the Chessmaster" | March 26, 1991 | 1810 |

=== Season 19: 1991–92 ===
| No. overall | No. in season | Title | Original release date | Prod. code |
|---|---|---|---|---|
| 343 | 1 | "Sex, Lies and Toupee Tape" | October 1, 1991 | 1811 |
| 344 | 2 | "So You Want to Be a Doctor?" | October 9, 1991 | 1812 |
| 345 | 3 | "Secrets of the Dead Sea Scrolls" | October 15, 1991 | 1814 |
| 346 | 4 | "Suicide Mission to Chernobyl" | October 22, 1991 | 1815 |
| 347 | 5 | "Taller Than Everest?" | November 5, 1991 | 1816 |
| 348 | 6 | "Fastest Planes in the Sky" | November 12, 1991 | 1817 |
| 349 | 7 | "Avoiding the Surgeon's Knife" | December 3, 1991 | 1818 |
| 350 | 8 | "Skyscraper! A Nova Special" | December 10, 1991 | 1819 |
| 351 | 9 | "The Fine Art of Faking It" | December 17, 1991 | 1820 |
| 352 | 10 | "Hell Fighters of Kuwait" | January 14, 1992 | 1901 |
| 353 | 11 | "Submarine!" | January 21, 1992 | 1902 |
| 354 | 12 | "Saddam's War on Wildlife" | January 28, 1992 | 1903 |
| 355 | 13 | "What Smells?" | February 11, 1992 | 1904 |
| 356 | 14 | "Can You Believe TV Ratings?" | February 18, 1992 | 1905 |
| 357 | 15 | "Making a Dishonest Buck" | March 3, 1992 | 1906 |
| 358 | 16 | "Rescuing Baby Whales" | March 10, 1992 | 1907 |
| 359 | 17 | "An Astronaut's View of the Earth" | March 17, 1992 | 1908 |
| 360 | 18 | "Eclipse of the Century" | March 24, 1992 | 1909 |

=== Season 20: 1992–93 ===
| No. overall | No. in season | Title | Original release date | Prod. code |
|---|---|---|---|---|
| 361 | 1 | "Animal Olympians II" | August 25, 1992 | 1910 |
| 362 | 2 | "The Genius Behind the Bomb" | September 29, 1992 | 1911 |
| 363 | 3 | "Mind of a Serial Killer" | October 13, 1992 | 1912 |
| 364 | 4 | "Search for the First Americans" | October 20, 1992 | 1913 |
| 365 | 5 | "Rafting Through the Grand Canyon" | October 27, 1992 | 1914 |
| 366 | 6 | "This Old Pyramid" | November 4, 1992 | 1915 |
| 367 | 7 | "Iceman" | November 10, 1992 | 1916 |
| 368 | 8 | "The Private Lives of Dolphins" | November 17, 1992 | 1917 |
| 369 | 9 | "Brain Transplant" | December 1, 1992 | 1918 |
| 370 | 10 | "Can You Stop People From Drinking?" | December 22, 1992 | 1919 |
| 371 | 11 | "Sex and the Single Rhino" | December 29, 1992 | 1920 |
| 372 | 12 | "The Hunt for Saddam's Secret Weapons" | January 12, 1993 | 2001 |
| 373 | 13 | "Can Bombing Win a War?" | January 19, 1993 | 2002 |
| 374 | 14 | "The Deadly Deception" | January 26, 1993 | 2003 |
| 375 | 15 | "Nazis and the Russian Bomb" | February 2, 1993 | 2004 |
| 376 | 16 | "In the Path of a Killer Volcano" | February 9, 1993 | 2005 |
| 377 | 17 | "Can Science Build a Champion Athlete?" | February 16, 1993 | 2006 |
| 378 | 18 | "Diving for Pirate Gold" | February 23, 1993 | 2007 |
| 379 | 19 | "Murder, Rape and DNA" | March 2, 1993 | 2008 |
| 380 | 20 | "The Lost Tribe" | March 30, 1993 | 2009 |

=== Seasons 21–40 ===
21 • 22 • 23 • 24 • 25 • 26 • 27 • 28 • 29 • 30 • 31 • 32 • 33 • 34 • 35 • 36 • 37 • 38 • 39 • 40

=== Season 21: 1993–94 ===
| No. overall | No. in season | Title | Original release date | Prod. code |
|---|---|---|---|---|
| 381 | 1 | "The NOVA Quiz" | October 5, 1993 | 2010 |
| 382 | 2 | "Wanted: Butch and Sundance" | October 12, 1993 | 2011 |
| 383 | 3 | "Secrets of the Psychics" | October 19, 1993 | 2012 |
| 384 | 4 | "Dying to Breathe" | October 26, 1993 | 2013 |
| 385 | 5 | "Shadow of the Condor" | November 2, 1993 | 2014 |
| 386 | 6 | "The Real Jurassic Park" | November 9, 1993 | 2015 |
| 387 | 7 | "Roller Coaster!" | November 16, 1993 | 2016 |
| 388 | 8 | "Mysterious Crash of Flight 201" | November 30, 1993 | 2017 |
| 389 | 9 | "Great Moments from NOVA" | December 7, 1993 | 2018 |
| 390 | 10 | "The Best Mind Since Einstein" | December 21, 1993 | 2019 |
| 391 | 11 | "Stranger in the Mirror" | December 28, 1993 | 2020 |
| 392 | 12 | "Codebreakers" | January 18, 1994 | 2101 |
| 393 | 13 | "Dinosaurs of the Gobi" | January 25, 1994 | 2102 |
| 394 | 14 | "Daredevils of the Sky" | February 1, 1994 | 2103 |
| 395 | 15 | "Journey to Kilimanjaro" | February 8, 1994 | 2104 |
| 396 | 16 | "Can Chimps Talk?" | February 15, 1994 | 2105 |
| 397 | 17 | "In Search of Human Origins: The Story of Lucy" (1 of 3) | February 28, 1994 | 2106 |
| 398 | 18 | "In Search of Human Origins: Surviving in Africa" (2 of 3) | March 1, 1994 | 2107 |
| 399 | 19 | "In Search of Human Origins: The Creative Revolution" (3 of 3) | March 2, 1994 | 2108 |
| 400 | 20 | "Can China Kick the Habit?" | April 12, 1994 | 2109 |
| 401 | 21 | "Aircraft Carrier!" | April 19, 1994 | 2110 |

=== Season 22: 1994–95 ===
| No. overall | No. in season | Title | Original release date | Prod. code |
|---|---|---|---|---|
| 402 | 1 | "The Great Wildlife Heist" | October 11, 1994 | 2111 |
| 403 | 2 | "The Secret of the Wild Child" | October 18, 1994 | 2112 |
| 404 | 3 | "Haunted Cry of a Long Gone Bird" | October 25, 1994 | 2113 |
| 405 | 4 | "What's New About Menopause" | November 1, 1994 | 2114 |
| 406 | 5 | "The Tribe that Time Forgot" | November 8, 1994 | 2115 |
| 407 | 6 | "Killer Quake!" | November 15, 1994 | 2116 |
| 408 | 7 | "Buried in Ash" | November 29, 1994 | 2117 |
| 409 | 8 | "Rescue Mission in Space" | December 6, 1994 | 2118 |
| 410 | 9 | "Journey to the Sacred Sea" | December 20, 1994 | 2119 |
| 411 | 10 | "In Search of the First Language" | December 27, 1994 | 2120 |
| 412 | 11 | "Mammoths of the Ice Age" | January 10, 1995 | 2201 |
| 413 | 12 | "Vikings in America" | January 24, 1995 | 2202 |
| 414 | 13 | "Little Creatures Who Run the World" | January 31, 1995 | 2203 |
| 415 | 14 | "Nazi Designers of Death" | February 7, 1995 | 2204 |
| 416 | 15 | "Siamese Twins" | February 14, 1995 | 2205 |
| 417 | 16 | "Mystery of the Senses: Hearing" (1 of 5) | February 19, 1995 | TBA |
| 418 | 17 | "Mystery of the Senses: Smell" (2 of 5) | February 20, 1995 | TBA |
| 419 | 18 | "Mystery of the Senses: Taste" (3 of 5) | February 21, 1995 | TBA |
| 420 | 19 | "Mystery of the Senses: Touch" (4 of 5) | February 22, 1995 | TBA |
| 421 | 20 | "Mystery of the Senses: Vision" (5 of 5) | February 22, 1995 | TBA |
| 422 | 21 | "The Universe Within" | March 7, 1995 | 2206 |
| 423 | 22 | "Making of a Doctor" | May 3, 1995 | 2207 |
| 424 | 23 | "Fast Cars" | May 23, 1995 | 2208 |

=== Season 23: 1995–96 ===
| No. overall | No. in season | Title | Original release date | Prod. code |
|---|---|---|---|---|
| 425 | 1 | "Anastasia: Dead or Alive?" | October 10, 1995 | 2209 |
| 426 | 2 | "Venus Unveiled" | October 17, 1995 | 2210 |
| 427 | 3 | "Hawaii: Born of Fire" | October 24, 1995 | 2211 |
| 428 | 4 | "The Doomsday Asteroid" | October 31, 1995 | 2212 |
| 429 | 5 | "Lightning!" | November 7, 1995 | 2213 |
| 430 | 6 | "Hunt for the Serial Arsonist" | November 14, 1995 | 2214 |
| 431 | 7 | "Treasures of the Great Barrier Reef" | November 28, 1995 | 2215 |
| 432 | 8 | "Race to Catch a Buckyball" | December 19, 1995 | 2216 |
| 433 | 9 | "Can Buildings Make You Sick?" | December 26, 1995 | 2217 |
| 434 | 10 | "Terror in the Mine Fields" | January 9, 1996 | 2301 |
| 435 | 11 | "The Day the Earth Shook" | January 16, 1996 | 2302 |
| 436 | 12 | "B-29 Frozen in Time" | January 30, 1996 | 2303 |
| 437 | 13 | "Plague Fighters" | February 6, 1996 | 2304 |
| 438 | 14 | "War Machines of Tomorrow" | February 20, 1996 | 2305 |
| 439 | 15 | "Kidnapped by UFOs?" | February 27, 1996 | 2306 |
| 440 | 16 | "Flood!" | March 26, 1996 | 2307 |
| 441 | 17 | "Dr. Spock the Baby Doc" | April 2, 1996 | 2308 |
| 442 | 18 | "Warriors of the Amazon" | April 9, 1996 | 2309 |
| 443 | 19 | "Bombing of America" | April 16, 1996 | 2310 |

=== Season 24: 1996–97 ===
| No. overall | No. in season | Title | Original release date | Prod. code |
|---|---|---|---|---|
| 444 | 1 | "Einstein Revealed" | October 1, 1996 | 2311 |
| 445 | 2 | "Lost City of Arabia" | October 8, 1996 | 2312 |
| 446 | 3 | "Three Men and a Balloon" | October 15, 1996 | 2313 |
| 447 | 4 | "Secrets of Making Money" | October 22, 1996 | 2314 |
| 448 | 5 | "Top Gun Over Moscow" | November 12, 1996 | 2315 |
| 449 | 6 | "Shark Attack" | November 19, 1996 | 2316 |
| 450 | 7 | "Odyssey of Life: The Ultimate Journey" (1 of 3) | November 24, 1996 | 2317 |
| 451 | 8 | "Odyssey of Life: The Unknown World" (2 of 3) | November 25, 1996 | 2318 |
| 452 | 9 | "Odyssey of Life: The Photographer's Secrets" (3 of 3) | November 26, 1996 | 2319 |
| 453 | 10 | "Cracking the Ice Age" | December 31, 1996 | 2320 |
| 454 | 11 | "Kaboom!" | January 14, 1997 | 2401 |
| 455 | 12 | "Titanic's Lost Sister" | January 28, 1997 | 2402 |
| 456 | 13 | "Secrets of Lost Empires: Stonehenge" (1 of 4) | February 11, 1997 | 2403 |
| 457 | 14 | "Secrets of Lost Empires: Inca" (2 of 4) | February 11, 1997 | 2404 |
| 458 | 15 | "Secrets of Lost Empires: Obelisk" (3 of 4) | February 12, 1997 | 2405 |
| 459 | 16 | "Secrets of Lost Empires: Colosseum" (4 of 4) | February 12, 1997 | 2406 |
| 460 | 17 | "Hunt for Alien Worlds" | February 18, 1997 | 2407 |
| 461 | 18 | "Curse of T. Rex" | February 25, 1997 | 2408 |
| 462 | 19 | "Cut to the Heart" | April 8, 1997 | 2409 |
| 463 | 20 | "Kingdom of the Seahorse" | April 15, 1997 | 2410 |

=== Season 25: 1997–98 ===
| No. overall | No. in season | Title | Original release date | Prod. code |
|---|---|---|---|---|
| 464 | 1 | "Coma" | October 7, 1997 | 2411 |
| 465 | 2 | "Faster Than Sound" | October 14, 1997 | 2412 |
| 466 | 3 | "Bomb Squad" | October 21, 1997 | 2413 |
| 467 | 4 | "The Proof" | October 28, 1997 | 2414 |
| 468 | 5 | "Wild Wolves with David Attenborough" | November 11, 1997 | 2415 |
| 469 | 6 | "Super Bridge" | November 12, 1997 | 2416 |
| 470 | 7 | "Treasures of the Sunken City" | November 18, 1997 | 2417 |
| 471 | 8 | "Avalanche!" | November 25, 1997 | 2418 |
| 472 | 9 | "Danger in the Jet Stream" | December 2, 1997 | 2419 |
| 473 | 10 | "Night Creatures of the Kalahari" | January 6, 1998 | 2501 |
| 474 | 11 | "Mysterious Mummies of China" | January 20, 1998 | 2502 |
| 475 | 12 | "Supersonic Spies" | January 27, 1998 | 2503 |
| 476 | 13 | "Animal Hospital" | February 3, 1998 | 2504 |
| 477 | 14 | "The Brain Eater" | February 10, 1998 | 2505 |
| 478 | 15 | "Everest – The Death Zone" | February 24, 1998 | 2506 |
| 479 | 16 | "Search for the Lost Cave People" | March 31, 1998 | 2507 |
| 480 | 17 | "Warnings from the Ice" | April 21, 1998 | 2508 |
| 481 | 18 | "Crocodiles!" | April 28, 1998 | 2509 |
| 482 | 19 | "The Truth About Impotence" | May 12, 1998 | 2510 |

=== Season 26: 1998–99 ===
| No. overall | No. in season | Title | Original release date | Prod. code |
|---|---|---|---|---|
| 483 | 1 | "Lost at Sea: The Search for Longitude" | October 6, 1998 | 2511 |
| 484 | 2 | "Chasing El Niño" | October 13, 1998 | 2512 |
| 485 | 3 | "Terror In Space" | October 27, 1998 | 2513 |
| 486 | 4 | "Special Effects: Titanic and Beyond" | November 3, 1998 | 2514 |
| 487 | 5 | "Deadly Shadow of Vesuvius" | November 10, 1998 | 2515 |
| 488 | 6 | "Ice Mummies: Frozen in Heaven" (1 of 3) | November 24, 1998 | 2516 |
| 489 | 7 | "Ice Mummies: Siberian Ice Maiden" (2 of 3) | November 24, 1998 | 2517 |
| 490 | 8 | "Ice Mummies: Return of the Iceman" (3 of 3) | November 24, 1998 | 2518 |
| 491 | 9 | "Leopards of the Night" | December 1, 1998 | 2519 |
| 492 | 10 | "The Perfect Pearl" | December 29, 1998 | 2520 |
| 493 | 11 | "The Beast of Loch Ness" | January 12, 1999 | 2601 |
| 494 | 12 | "Submarines, Secrets, and Spies" | January 19, 1999 | 2602 |
| 495 | 13 | "Surviving AIDS" | February 2, 1999 | 2603 |
| 496 | 14 | "Escape! Because Accidents Happen: Fire" (1 of 4) | February 16, 1999 | 2604 |
| 497 | 15 | "Escape! Because Accidents Happen: Car Crash" (2 of 4) | February 16, 1999 | 2605 |
| 498 | 16 | "Escape! Because Accidents Happen: Plane Crash" (3 of 4) | February 17, 1999 | 2606 |
| 499 | 17 | "Escape! Because Accidents Happen: Abandon Ship" (4 of 4) | February 17, 1999 | 2607 |
| 500 | 18 | "Battle Alert in the Gulf" | February 23, 1999 | 2608 |
| 501 | 19 | "Volcanoes of the Deep" | March 30, 1999 | 2609 |
| 502 | 20 | "To the Moon" | July 13, 1999 | 2610 |

=== Season 27: 1999–2000 ===
| No. overall | No. in season | Title | Original release date | Prod. code |
|---|---|---|---|---|
| 503 | 1 | "Fall of the Leaning Tower" | October 5, 1999 | 2611 |
| 504 | 2 | "Everest: The Death Zone" | October 6, 1999 | 2612 |
| 505 | 3 | "Time Travel" | October 12, 1999 | 2613 |
| 506 | 4 | "The Killer's Trail" | October 19, 1999 | 2614 |
| 507 | 5 | "Island of the Spirits" | November 2, 1999 | 2615 |
| 508 | 6 | "Decoding Nazi Secrets" | November 9, 1999 | 2616 |
| 509 | 7 | "Voyage of Doom" | November 23, 1999 | 2617 |
| 510 | 8 | "Electric Heart" | December 21, 1999 | 2618 |
| 511 | 9 | "Tales from the Hive" | January 4, 2000 | 2701 |
| 512 | 10 | "Lost on Everest" | January 18, 2000 | 2702 |
| 513 | 11 | "Secrets of Lost Empires: Medieval Siege" (1 of 5) | February 1, 2000 | TBA |
| 514 | 12 | "The Diamond Deception" | February 1, 2000 | 2703 |
| 515 | 13 | "Secrets of Lost Empires: Pharaoh's Obelisk" (2 of 5) | February 8, 2000 | TBA |
| 516 | 14 | "Trillion Dollar Bet" | February 8, 2000 | 2704 |
| 517 | 15 | "Secrets of Lost Empires: Easter Island" (3 of 5) | February 15, 2000 | TBA |
| 518 | 16 | "Mystery of the First Americans" | February 15, 2000 | 2705 |
| 519 | 17 | "Secrets of Lost Empires: Roman Bath" (4 of 5) | February 22, 2000 | TBA |
| 520 | 18 | "Lost Tribes of Israel" | February 22, 2000 | 2706 |
| 521 | 19 | "Secrets of Lost Empires: China Bridge" (5 of 5) | February 29, 2000 | TBA |
| 522 | 20 | "What's Up with the Weather?" | April 18, 2000 | TBA |
| 523 | 21 | "Stationed in the Stars" | April 25, 2000 | 2707 |
| 524 | 22 | "The Vikings" | May 9, 2000 | 2708 |

=== Season 28: 2000–01 ===
| No. overall | No. in season | Title | Original release date | Prod. code |
|---|---|---|---|---|
| 525 | 1 | "Lincoln's Secret Weapon" | October 24, 2000 | 2710 |
| 526 | 2 | "Holocaust on Trial" | October 31, 2000 | 2711 |
| 527 | 3 | "Hitler's Lost Sub" | November 14, 2000 | 2712 |
| 528 | 4 | "Runaway Universe" | November 21, 2000 | 2713 |
| 529 | 5 | "Garden of Eden" | November 28, 2000 | 2714 |
| 530 | 6 | "Dying to Be Thin" | December 12, 2000 | 2715 |
| 531 | 7 | "Japan's Secret Garden" | December 18, 2000 | 2716 |
| 532 | 8 | "Sultan's Lost Treasure" | January 16, 2001 | 2801 |
| 533 | 9 | "Vanished!" | January 30, 2001 | 2802 |
| 534 | 10 | "Nazi Prison Escape" | February 6, 2001 | 2803 |
| 535 | 11 | "Lost King of the Maya" | February 13, 2001 | 2804 |
| 536 | 12 | "Cancer Warrior" | February 27, 2001 | 2805 |
| 537 | 13 | "Survivor M.D.: Tattooed Doctor" (1 of 3) | March 27, 2001 | 2806 |
| 538 | 14 | "Survivor M.D.: Second Opinions" (2 of 3) | April 3, 2001 | 2807 |
| 539 | 15 | "Survivor M.D.: Hearts & Minds" (3 of 3) | April 10, 2001 | 2808 |
| 540 | 16 | "Cracking the Code of Life" | April 17, 2001 | 2809 |
| 541 | 17 | "Harvest of Fear" | April 24, 2001 | TBA |

=== Season 29: 2001–02 ===
| No. overall | No. in season | Title | Original release date | Prod. code |
|---|---|---|---|---|
| 542 | 1 | "Search for a Safe Cigarette" | October 2, 2001 | 2810 |
| 543 | 2 | "18 Ways to Make a Baby" | October 9, 2001 | 2811 |
| 544 | 3 | "Secrets of the Mind" | October 23, 2001 | 2812 |
| 545 | 4 | "Sex: Unknown" | October 30, 2001 | 2813 |
| 546 | 5 | "Russia's Nuclear Warriors" | November 6, 2001 | 2814 |
| 547 | 6 | "Bioterror" | November 13, 2001 | 2815 |
| 548 | 7 | "Life's Greatest Miracle" | November 20, 2001 | 2816 |
| 549 | 8 | "Methuselah Tree" | December 11, 2001 | 2817 |
| 550 | 9 | "Flying Casanovas" | December 25, 2001 | 2818 |
| 551 | 10 | "Death Star" | January 8, 2002 | 2901 |
| 552 | 11 | "Neanderthals on Trial" | January 22, 2002 | 2902 |
| 553 | 12 | "Fireworks!" | January 29, 2002 | 2903 |
| 554 | 13 | "Secrets, Lies, and Atomic Spies" | February 5, 2002 | 2904 |
| 555 | 14 | "The Missing Link" | February 26, 2002 | 2905 |
| 556 | 15 | "Shackleton's Voyage of Endurance" | March 26, 2002 | 2906 |
| 557 | 16 | "Why the Towers Fell" | April 30, 2002 | 2907 |
| 558 | 17 | "Fire Wars" | May 7, 2002 | 2908 |

=== Season 30: 2002–03 ===
| No. overall | No. in season | Title | Original release date | Prod. code |
|---|---|---|---|---|
| 559 | 1 | "Killer Disease on Campus" | September 3, 2002 | 2909 |
| 560 | 2 | "Mysterious Life of Caves" | October 1, 2002 | 2910 |
| 561 | 3 | "Lost Roman Treasure" | October 8, 2002 | 2911 |
| 562 | 4 | "Galileo's Battle for the Heavens" | October 29, 2002 | 2912 |
| 563 | 5 | "Volcano's Deadly Warning" | November 12, 2002 | 2913 |
| 564 | 6 | "Sinking City of Venice" | November 19, 2002 | 2914 |
| 565 | 7 | "Orchid Hunter" | November 26, 2002 | 2915 |
| 566 | 8 | "Spies That Fly" | January 7, 2003 | 3001 |
| 567 | 9 | "Last Flight of Bomber 31" | January 14, 2003 | 3002 |
| 568 | 10 | "Ancient Creature of the Deep" | January 21, 2003 | 3003 |
| 569 | 11 | "Battle of the X-Planes" | February 4, 2003 | 3004 |
| 570 | 12 | "Mountain of Ice" | February 11, 2003 | 3005 |
| 571 | 13 | "Lost Treasures of Tibet" | February 18, 2003 | 3006 |
| 572 | 14 | "Dirty Bomb" | February 25, 2003 | 3007 |
| 573 | 15 | "Deep Sea Invasion" | April 1, 2003 | 3008 |
| 574 | 16 | "Secret of Photo 51" | April 15, 2003 | 3009 |

=== Season 31: 2003–04 ===
| No. overall | No. in season | Title | Original release date | Prod. code |
|---|---|---|---|---|
| 575 | 1 | "Infinite Secrets" | September 30, 2003 | 3010 |
| 576 | 2 | "Who Killed the Red Baron?" | October 7, 2003 | 3011 |
| 577 | 3 | "The Elegant Universe: Einstein's Dream" (1 of 3) | October 28, 2003 | 3012 |
| 578 | 4 | "The Elegant Universe: String's the Thing" (2 of 3) | October 28, 2003 | 3013 |
| 579 | 5 | "The Elegant Universe: Welcome to the 11th Dimension" (3 of 3) | November 4, 2003 | 3014 |
| 580 | 6 | "Wright Brothers' Flying Machine" | November 11, 2003 | 3015 |
| 581 | 7 | "Magnetic Storm" | November 18, 2003 | 3016 |
| 582 | 8 | "Volcano Above the Clouds" | November 25, 2003 | 3017 |
| 583 | 9 | "Mars Dead or Alive" | January 4, 2004 | 3101 |
| 584 | 10 | "Secrets of the Crocodile Caves" | January 20, 2004 | 3102 |
| 585 | 11 | "Dogs and More Dogs" | February 3, 2004 | 3103 |
| 586 | 12 | "Descent into the Ice" | February 10, 2004 | 3104 |
| 587 | 13 | "Crash of Flight 111" | February 17, 2004 | 3105 |
| 588 | 14 | "Life and Death in the War Zone" | March 4, 2004 | 3106 |
| 589 | 15 | "Hunt for the Supertwister" | March 30, 2004 | 3107 |
| 590 | 16 | "World in the Balance: The People Paradox" | April 20, 2004 | 3108 |
| 590 | 16 | "World in the Balance: China Revs Up" | April 20, 2004 | 3108 |
| 591 | 17 | "Battle Plan Under Fire" | May 4, 2004 | 3110 |

=== Season 32: 2004–05 ===
| No. overall | No. in season | Title | Original release date | Prod. code |
|---|---|---|---|---|
| 592 | 1 | "Origins: Earth is Born" (1 of 4) | September 28, 2004 | 3111 |
| 593 | 2 | "Origins: How Life Began" (2 of 4) | September 28, 2004 | 3112 |
| 594 | 3 | "Origins: Where Are the Aliens?" (3 of 4) | September 29, 2004 | 3113 |
| 595 | 4 | "Origins: Back to the Beginning" (4 of 4) | September 29, 2004 | 3114 |
| 596 | 5 | "The Most Dangerous Woman in America: Typhoid Mary" | October 12, 2004 | 3115 |
| 597 | 6 | "America's Stone Age Explorers" | November 9, 2004 | 3116 |
| 598 | 7 | "Great Escape" | November 16, 2004 | 3117 |
| 599 | 8 | "Ancient Refuge in the Holy Land" | November 23, 2004 | 3118 |
| 600 | 9 | "Welcome to Mars" | January 4, 2005 | 3201 |
| 601 | 10 | "The Boldest Hoax" | January 11, 2005 | 3202 |
| 602 | 11 | "Supersonic Dream" | January 18, 2005 | 3203 |
| 603 | 12 | "The Viking Deception" | February 8, 2005 | 3205 |
| 604 | 13 | "Saving the National Treasures" | February 15, 2005 | 3206 |
| 605 | 14 | "A Daring Flight" | February 22, 2005 | 3207 |
| 606 | 15 | "Wave That Shook the World" | March 29, 2005 | 3208 |

=== Season 33: 2005–06 ===
| No. overall | No. in season | Title | Original release date | Prod. code |
|---|---|---|---|---|
| 607 | 1 | "Mystery of the Megaflood" | September 20, 2005 | 3211 |
| 608 | 2 | "Sinking the Supership" | October 4, 2005 | 3212 |
| 609 | 3 | "Einstein's Big Idea (E=mc²: Einstein's Big Idea)" | October 11, 2005 | 3213 |
| 610 | 4 | "Volcano Under the City" | November 1, 2005 | 3215 |
| 611 | 5 | "Hitler's Sunken Secret" | November 8, 2005 | 3216 |
| 612 | 6 | "Newton's Dark Secrets" | November 15, 2005 | 3217 |
| 613 | 7 | "Storm That Drowned A City" | November 22, 2005 | 3218 |
| 614 | 8 | "The Mummy Who Would Be King" | January 3, 2006 | 3301 |
| 615 | 9 | "Deadly Ascent" | January 17, 2006 | 3303 |
| 616 | 10 | "The Perfect Corpse" | February 7, 2006 | 3304 |
| 617 | 11 | "Jewel of the Earth" | February 14, 2006 | 3305 |
| 618 | 12 | "The Ghost Particle" | February 21, 2006 | 3306 |
| 619 | 13 | "Arctic Passage" | February 28, 2006 | 3307 |
| 620 | 14 | "The Great Robot Race" | March 28, 2006 | 3308 |
| 621 | 15 | "Voyage to the Mystery Moon" | April 4, 2006 | 3309 |
| 622 | 16 | "Dimming the Sun" | April 18, 2006 | 3310 |

=== Season 34: 2006–07 ===
| No. overall | No. in season | Title | Original release date | Prod. code |
|---|---|---|---|---|
| 623 | 1 | "Building on Ground Zero" | September 5, 2006 | 3311 |
| 624 | 2 | "Mystery of the Megavolcano" | September 26, 2006 | 3312 |
| 625 | 3 | "The Deadliest Plane Crash" | October 17, 2006 | 3314 |
| 626 | 4 | "Monster of the Milky Way" | October 31, 2006 | 3315 |
| 627 | 5 | "Wings of Madness" | November 7, 2006 | 3316 |
| 628 | 6 | "The Family That Walks On All Fours" | November 14, 2006 | 3317 |
| 629 | 7 | "Underwater Dream Machine" | December 26, 2006 | 3319 |
| 630 | 8 | "Forgotten Genius" | February 6, 2007 | 3402 |
| 631 | 9 | "The Last Great Ape" | February 13, 2007 | 3403 |
| 632 | 10 | "Kings of Camouflage" | April 3, 2007 | 3404 |
| 633 | 11 | "First Flower" | April 17, 2007 | 3405 |
| 634 | 12 | "Saved by the Sun" | April 24, 2007 | 3406 |
| 635 | 13 | "Pocahontas Revealed" | May 8, 2007 | 3407 |
| 636 | 14 | "Bone Diggers" | June 19, 2007 | 3408 |
| 637 | 15 | "The Great Inca Rebellion" | June 26, 2007 | 3409 |

=== Season 35: 2007–08 ===
| No. overall | No. in season | Title | Original release date | Prod. code |
|---|---|---|---|---|
| 638 | 1 | "Secrets of the Samurai Sword" | October 9, 2007 | 3412 |
| 639 | 2 | "Ghost in Your Genes" | October 16, 2007 | 3413 |
| 640 | 3 | "Marathon Challenge" | October 30, 2007 | 3414 |
| 641 | 4 | "Sputnik Declassified" | November 6, 2007 | 3415 |
| 642 | 5 | "Judgment Day: Intelligent Design on Trial" | November 13, 2007 | 3416 |
| 643 | 6 | "Master of the Killer Ants" | November 20, 2007 | 3417 |
| 644 | 7 | "Missing in MiG Alley" | December 18, 2007 | 3418 |
| 645 | 8 | "Absolute Zero: The Conquest of Cold" (1 of 2) | January 8, 2008 | 3504 |
| 646 | 9 | "Absolute Zero: The Race for Absolute Zero" (2 of 2) | January 15, 2008 | 3505 |
| 647 | 10 | "Secrets of the Parthenon" | January 29, 2008 | 3503 |
| 648 | 11 | "Astrospies" | February 12, 2008 | 3501 |
| 649 | 12 | "Ape Genius" | February 19, 2008 | 3507 |
| 650 | 13 | "The Four-Winged Dinosaur" | February 26, 2008 | 3502 |
| 651 | 14 | "Cracking the Maya Code" | April 8, 2008 | 3508 |
| 652 | 15 | "Car of the Future" | April 22, 2008 | 3509 |
| 653 | 16 | "A Walk to Beautiful" | May 13, 2008 | 3506 |
| 654 | 17 | "Lord of the Ants" | May 20, 2008 | 3510 |

=== Season 36: 2008–09 ===
| No. overall | No. in season | Title | Original release date | Prod. code |
|---|---|---|---|---|
| 655 | 1 | "Arctic Dinosaurs" | October 7, 2008 | 3511 |
| 656 | 2 | "Space Shuttle Disaster" | October 14, 2008 | 3512 |
| 657 | 3 | "Parallel Worlds, Parallel Lives" | October 21, 2008 | 3513 |
| 658 | 4 | "Hunting the Hidden Dimension" | October 28, 2008 | 3514 |
| 659 | 5 | "Alien from Earth" | November 11, 2008 | 3515 |
| 660 | 6 | "The Bible's Buried Secrets" | November 18, 2008 | 3516 |
| 661 | 7 | "Ocean Animal Emergency" | November 25, 2008 | 3517 |
| 662 | 8 | "Is There Life on Mars?" | December 30, 2008 | 3518 |
| 663 | 9 | "The Big Energy Gamble" | January 20, 2009 | 3519 |
| 664 | 10 | "The Incredible Journey of the Butterflies" | January 27, 2009 | 3601 |
| 665 | 11 | "The Spy Factory" | February 3, 2009 | 3602 |
| 666 | 12 | "Rat Attack" | February 24, 2009 | 3603 |
| 667 | 13 | "Extreme Ice" | March 24, 2009 | 3604 |
| 668 | 14 | "Last Extinction" "Megabeasts' Sudden Death" | March 31, 2009 | 3607 |
| 669 | 15 | "Doctors' Diaries, Part One" | April 7, 2009 | 3608 |
| 670 | 16 | "Doctors' Diaries, Part Two" | April 14, 2009 | 3609 |
| 671 | 17 | "Musical Minds" | June 30, 2009 | 3610 |

=== Season 37: 2009–10 ===
| No. overall | No. in season | Title | Original release date | Prod. code |
|---|---|---|---|---|
| 672 | 1 | "Darwin's Darkest Hour" | October 6, 2009 | 3605. 3606 |
| 673 | 2 | "Hubble's Amazing Rescue" | October 13, 2009 | 3611 |
| 674 | 3 | "Lizard Kings" | October 20, 2009 | 3616 |
| 675 | 4 | "Becoming Human: Unearthing Our Earliest Ancestors: First Steps" (1 of 3) | November 3, 2009 | 3613 |
| 676 | 5 | "Becoming Human: Unearthing Our Earliest Ancestors: Birth of Humanity" (2 of 3) | November 10, 2009 | 3614 |
| 677 | 6 | "Becoming Human: Unearthing Our Earliest Ancestors: Last Human Standing" (3 of 3) | November 17, 2009 | 3615 |
| 678 | 7 | "What Are Dreams?" | November 24, 2009 | 3612 |
| 679 | 8 | "What Darwin Never Knew" | December 29, 2009 | 3617 |
| 680 | 9 | "Killer Subs in Pearl Harbor" | January 5, 2010 | 3701 |
| 681 | 10 | "Building Pharaoh's Ship" | January 12, 2010 | 3702 |
| 682 | 11 | "Riddles of the Sphinx" | January 19, 2010 | 3703 |
| 683 | 12 | "Ghosts of Machu Picchu" | February 2, 2010 | 3704 |
| 684 | 13 | "Extreme Cave Diving" | February 9, 2010 | 3705 |
| 685 | 14 | "The Pluto Files" | March 2, 2010 | 3706 |
| 686 | 15 | "Hunting the Edge of Space: The Mystery of the Milky Way" (1 of 2) | April 6, 2010 | 3708 |
| 687 | 16 | "Hunting the Edge of Space: The Ever Expanding Universe" (2 of 2) | April 13, 2010 | 3709 |
| 688 | 17 | "Mind Over Money: How Human Psychology and Finance Interact" | April 27, 2010 | 3707 |
| 689 | 18 | "Mt. St. Helens: Back From The Dead" | May 4, 2010 | 3710 |

=== Season 38: 2010–11 ===
| No. overall | No. in season | Title | Original release date | Prod. code |
|---|---|---|---|---|
| 690 | 1 | "Building the Great Cathedrals" | October 19, 2010 | 3711 |
| 691 | 2 | "Emergency Mine Rescue" | October 26, 2010 | 3712 |
| 692 | 3 | "Trapped in an Elevator" | November 2, 2010 | 3713 |
| 693 | 4 | "Dogs Decoded" | November 9, 2010 | 3714 |
| 694 | 5 | "Secrets of Stonehenge" | November 16, 2010 | 3715 |
| 695 | 6 | "Quest for Solomon's Mines" | November 23, 2010 | 3716 |
| 696 | 7 | "Secrets Beneath the Ice" | December 28, 2010 | 3717 |
| 697 | 8 | "Deadliest Earthquakes" | January 11, 2011 | 3801 |
| 698 | 9 | "Making Stuff: Stronger" (1 of 4) | January 19, 2011 | 3802 |
| 699 | 10 | "Making Stuff: Smaller" (2 of 4) | January 26, 2011 | 3803 |
| 700 | 11 | "Making Stuff: Cleaner" (3 of 4) | February 2, 2011 | 3804 |
| 701 | 12 | "Making Stuff: Smarter" (4 of 4) | February 9, 2011 | 3805 |
| 702 | 13 | "Smartest Machine on Earth" | February 9, 2011 | 3806 |
| 703 | 14 | "Crash of Flight 447" | February 16, 2011 | 3807 |
| 704 | 15 | "Venom: Nature's Killer" | February 23, 2011 | 3808 |
| 705 | 16 | "Japan's Killer Quake" | March 30, 2011 | 3810 |
| 706 | 17 | "Power Surge" | April 20, 2011 | 3809 |

=== Season 39: 2011–12 ===
| No. overall | No. in season | Title | Original release date | Prod. code |
|---|---|---|---|---|
| 707 | 1 | "Engineering Ground Zero" | September 7, 2011 | 3811 |
| 708 | 2 | "Surviving The Tsunami" | September 28, 2011 | 3812 |
| 709 | 3 | "Finding Life Beyond Earth: Are We Alone?" | October 19, 2011 | 3813, 3814 |
| 709 | 3 | "Finding Life Beyond Earth: Moons and Beyond" | October 19, 2011 | 3813, 3814 |
| 710 | 4 | "Iceman Murder Mystery" | October 26, 2011 | 3815 |
| 711 | 5 | "The Fabric of the Cosmos: What is Space?" (1 of 4) | November 2, 2011 | 3816 |
| 712 | 6 | "The Fabric of the Cosmos: The Illusion of Time" (2 of 4) | November 9, 2011 | 3817 |
| 713 | 7 | "The Fabric of the Cosmos: Quantum Leap" (3 of 4) | November 16, 2011 | 3818 |
| 714 | 8 | "The Fabric of the Cosmos: Universe or Multiverse?" (4 of 4) | November 23, 2011 | 3819 |
| 715 | 9 | "Deadliest Volcanoes" | January 4, 2012 | 3901 |
| 716 | 10 | "Bombing Hitler's Dams" | January 11, 2012 | 3902 |
| 717 | 11 | "3D Spies of WWII" | January 18, 2012 | 3903 |
| 718 | 12 | "Mystery of a Masterpiece" | January 25, 2012 | 3904 |
| 719 | 13 | "Ice Age Death Trap" | February 1, 2012 | 3905 |
| 720 | 14 | "Separating Twins" | February 8, 2012 | 3908 |
| 721 | 15 | "Cracking Your Genetic Code" | March 28, 2012 | 3909 |
| 722 | 16 | "Hunting the Elements" | April 4, 2012 | 3906 |
| 723 | 17 | "Deadliest Tornadoes" | April 11, 2012 | 3910 |
| 724 | 18 | "Why Ships Sink" | April 18, 2012 | 3911 |
| 725 | 19 | "Secrets of the Sun" | April 25, 2012 | 3907 |

=== Season 40: 2012–13 ===
| No. overall | No. in season | Title | Original release date | Prod. code |
|---|---|---|---|---|
| 726 | 1 | "Secrets of the Viking Sword" | October 10, 2012 | 3913 |
| 727 | 2 | "Forensics on Trial" | October 17, 2012 | 3912 |
| 728 | 3 | "Mystery of Easter Island" | November 7, 2012 | 3914 |
| 729 | 4 | "Ultimate Mars Challenge" | November 14, 2012 | 3915 |
| 730 | 5 | "Inside the Megastorm" | November 18, 2012 | 3916 |
| 731 | 6 | "Doomsday Volcanoes" | January 2, 2013 | 4001 |
| 732 | 7 | "Decoding Neanderthals" | January 9, 2013 | 4002 |
| 733 | 8 | "Rise of the Drones" | January 23, 2013 | 4003 |
| 734 | 9 | "Who Killed Lindbergh's Baby?" | January 30, 2013 | 4004 |
| 735 | 10 | "Building Pharaoh's Chariot" | February 6, 2013 | 4005 |
| 736 | 11 | "Earth From Space" | February 13, 2013 | 4006 |
| 737 | 12 | "Mind of a Rampage Killer" | February 20, 2013 | 4008 |
| 738 | 13 | "Meteor Strike" | March 27, 2013 | 4013 |
| 739 | 14 | "Ancient Computer" | April 3, 2013 | 4007 |
| 740 | 15 | "Australia's First 4 Billion Years: Awakening" | April 10, 2013 | 4009 |
| 741 | 16 | "Australia's First 4 Billion Years: Life Explodes" | April 17, 2013 | 4010 |
| 742 | 17 | "Australia's First 4 Billion Years: Monsters" | April 24, 2013 | 4011 |
| 743 | 18 | "Australia's First 4 Billion Years: Strange Creatures" | May 1, 2013 | 4012 |
| 744 | 19 | "Manhunt—Boston Bombers" | May 29, 2013 | 4014 |
| 745 | 20 | "Oklahoma's Deadliest Tornadoes" | May 29, 2013 | 4015 |

=== Seasons 41–present ===
41 • 42 • 43 • 44 • 45 • 46 • 47 • 48 • 49 • 50 • 51 • 52 • 53

=== Season 41: 2013–14 ===
| No. overall | No. in season | Title | Original release date | Prod. code |
|---|---|---|---|---|
| 746 | 1 | "Ground Zero Supertower" | September 11, 2013 | 4016 |
| 747 | 2 | "Megastorm Aftermath" | October 9, 2013 | 4017 |
| 748 | 3 | "Making Stuff Faster" | October 16, 2013 | 4018 |
| 749 | 4 | "Making Stuff Wilder" | October 23, 2013 | 4019 |
| 750 | 5 | "Making Stuff Colder" | October 30, 2013 | 4020 |
| 751 | 6 | "Making Stuff Safer" | November 6, 2013 | 4021 |
| 752 | 7 | "Cold Case JFK" | November 13, 2013 | 4022 |
| 753 | 8 | "At the Edge of Space" | November 20, 2013 | 4023 |
| 754 | 9 | "Asteroid: Doomsday or Payday?" | November 20, 2013 | 4024 |
| 755 | 10 | "Alien Planets Revealed" | January 8, 2014 | 4101 |
| 756 | 11 | "Zeppelin Terror Attack" | January 15, 2014 | 4102 |
| 757 | 12 | "Killer Typhoon" | January 22, 2014 | 4106 |
| 758 | 13 | "Ghosts of Murdered Kings" | January 29, 2014 | 4103 |
| 759 | 14 | "Roman Catacomb Mystery" | February 5, 2014 | 4104 |
| 760 | 15 | "Great Cathedral Mystery" | February 12, 2014 | 4105 |
| 761 | 16 | "Wild Predator Invasion" | April 2, 2014 | 4107 |
| 762 | 17 | "Inside Animal Minds: Bird Genius" | April 9, 2014 | 4108 |
| 763 | 18 | "Inside Animal Minds: Dogs & Super Senses" | April 16, 2014 | 4109 |
| 764 | 19 | "Inside Animal Minds: Who's the Smartest?" | April 23, 2014 | 4110 |
| 765 | 20 | "Why Sharks Attack" | May 7, 2014 | 4111 |
| 766 | 21 | "Escape From Nazi Alcatraz" | May 14, 2014 | 4112 |
| 767 | 22 | "D-Day's Sunken Secrets" | May 28, 2014 | 4113 |

=== Season 42: 2014–15 ===
| No. overall | No. in season | Title | Original release date | Prod. code |
|---|---|---|---|---|
| 768 | 1 | "Vaccines—Calling The Shots" | September 10, 2014 | 4114 |
| 769 | 2 | "Rise of the Hackers" | September 24, 2014 | 4115 |
| 770 | 3 | "Why Planes Vanish" | October 8, 2014 | 4116 |
| 771 | 4 | "Surviving Ebola" | October 8, 2014 | 4123 |
| 772 | 5 | "Ben Franklin's Balloons" | October 22, 2014 | 4117 |
| 773 | 6 | "First Air War" | October 29, 2014 | 4118 |
| 774 | 7 | "Bigger Than T. rex" | November 5, 2014 | 4119 |
| 775 | 8 | "Emperor's Ghost Army" | November 12, 2014 | 4120 |
| 776 | 9 | "Killer Landslides" | November 19, 2014 | 4121 |
| 777 | 10 | "First Man on the Moon" | December 3, 2014 | 4122 |
| 778 | 11 | "Big Bang Machine" | January 14, 2015 | 4201 |
| 779 | 12 | "Sunken Ship Rescue" | January 21, 2015 | 4202 |
| 780 | 13 | "Sinkholes: Buried Alive" | January 28, 2015 | 4203 |
| 781 | 14 | "Colosseum: Roman Death Trap" | February 11, 2015 | 4206 |
| 782 | 15 | "Petra: Lost City of Stone" | February 18, 2015 | 4205 |
| 783 | 16 | "Hagia Sophia: Istanbul's Mystery" | February 25, 2015 | 4204 |
| 784 | 17 | "The Great Math Mystery" | April 15, 2015 | 4207 |
| 785 | 18 | "Invisible Universe Revealed" | April 22, 2015 | 4208 |
| 786 | 19 | "Nazi Attack on America" | May 6, 2015 | 4210 |
| 787 | 20 | "Lethal Seas" | May 13, 2015 | 4211 |
| 788 | 21 | "Chasing Pluto" | July 15, 2015 | 4213 |
| 789 | 22 | "Nuclear Meltdown Disaster" | July 29, 2015 | 4214 |

=== Season 43: 2015–16 ===
| No. overall | No. in season | Title | Original release date | Prod. code |
|---|---|---|---|---|
| 790 | 1 | "Dawn of Humanity" | September 16, 2015 | 4209, 4215 |
| 791 | 2 | "Arctic Ghost Ship" | September 23, 2015 | 4216 |
| 792 | 3 | "Secrets of Noah's Ark" | October 7, 2015 | 4212 |
| 793 | 4 | "Cyberwar Threat" | October 14, 2015 | 4217 |
| 794 | 5 | "Animal Mummies" | October 28, 2015 | 4219 |
| 795 | 6 | "Making North America: Origins" (1 of 3) | November 4, 2015 | 4220 |
| 796 | 7 | "Making North America: Life" (2 of 3) | November 11, 2015 | 4221 |
| 797 | 8 | "Making North America: Human" (3 of 3) | November 18, 2015 | 4222 |
| 798 | 9 | "Inside Einstein's Mind" | November 25, 2015 | 4223 |
| 799 | 10 | "Secret Tunnel Warfare" | January 6, 2016 | 4301 |
| 800 | 11 | "Life's Rocky Start" | January 13, 2016 | 4302 |
| 801 | 12 | "Mystery Beneath the Ice" | January 20, 2016 | 4303 |
| 802 | 13 | "Himalayan Megaquake" | January 27, 2016 | 4304 |
| 803 | 14 | "Creatures of Light" | February 3, 2016 | 4309 |
| 804 | 15 | "Memory Hackers" | February 10, 2016 | 4307 |
| 805 | 16 | "Iceman Reborn" | February 17, 2016 | 4305 |
| 806 | 17 | "Rise of the Robots" | February 24, 2016 | 4306 |
| 807 | 18 | "Vikings Unearthed" | April 6, 2016 | 4310 |
| 808 | 19 | "Can Alzheimer's Be Stopped?" | April 13, 2016 | 4308 |
| 809 | 20 | "Wild Ways" | April 20, 2016 | 4311 |
| 810 | 21 | "Operation Lighthouse Rescue" | May 4, 2016 | 4313 |
| 811 | 22 | "Bombing Hitler's Supergun" | May 11, 2016 | 4314 |

=== Season 44: 2016–17 ===
| No. overall | No. in season | Title | Original release date | Prod. code |
|---|---|---|---|---|
| 812 | 1 | "15 Years of Terror" | September 7, 2016 | 4316 |
| 813 | 2 | "School of the Future" | September 14, 2016 | 4315 |
| 814 | 3 | "Great Human Odyssey" | October 5, 2016 | 4312 |
| 815 | 4 | "Super Tunnel" | October 12, 2016 | 4317 |
| 816 | 5 | "Treasures of the Earth: Gems" (1 of 3) | November 2, 2016 | 4318 |
| 817 | 6 | "Treasures of the Earth: Metals" (2 of 3) | November 9, 2016 | 4319 |
| 818 | 7 | "Treasures of the Earth: Power" (3 of 3) | November 16, 2016 | 4320 |
| 819 | 8 | "Secrets of the Sky Tombs" | January 4, 2017 | 4401 |
| 820 | 9 | "The Nuclear Option" | January 11, 2017 | 4402 |
| 821 | 10 | "Search for the Super Battery" | February 1, 2017 | 4403 |
| 822 | 12 | "Ultimate Cruise Ship" | February 8, 2017 | 4404 |
| 823 | 13 | "The Origami Revolution" | February 15, 2017 | 4405 |
| 824 | 14 | "Why Trains Crash" | February 22, 2017 | 4406 |
| 825 | 15 | "Holocaust Escape Tunnel" | April 19, 2017 | 4407 |
| 826 | 16 | "Building Chernobyl's MegaTomb" | April 26, 2017 | 4408 |
| 827 | 17 | "Chinese Chariot Revealed" | May 17, 2017 | 4409 |
| 828 | 18 | "Poisoned Water" | May 31, 2017 | 4410 |

=== Season 45: 2017–18 ===
| No. overall | No. in season | Title | Original release date | Prod. code |
|---|---|---|---|---|
| 829 | 1 | "Eclipse Over America" | August 21, 2017 | 4411 |
| 830 | 2 | "Death Dive to Saturn" | September 13, 2017 | 4412 |
| 831 | 3 | "Secrets of the Shining Knight" | October 4, 2017 | 4413 |
| 832 | 4 | "Ghosts of Stonehenge" | October 11, 2017 | 4414 |
| 833 | 5 | "Secrets of the Forbidden City" | October 18, 2017 | 4415 |
| 834 | 6 | "Killer Volcanoes" | October 25, 2017 | 4416 |
| 835 | 7 | "Killer Hurricanes" | November 1, 2017 | 4417 |
| 836 | 8 | "Killer Floods" | November 8, 2017 | 4418 |
| 837 | 9 | "Extreme Animal Weapons" | November 22, 2017 | 4419 |
| 838 | 10 | "Bird Brain" | December 20, 2017 | 4420 |
| 839 | 11 | "Day The Dinosaurs Died" | December 27, 2017 | 4421 |
| 840 | 12 | "Black Hole Apocalypse" | January 10, 2018 | 4501, 4502 |
| 841 | 13 | "The Impossible Flight" | January 31, 2018 | 4503 |
| 842 | 14 | "First Face of America" | February 7, 2018 | 4504 |
| 843 | 15 | "Great Escape at Dunkirk" | February 14, 2018 | 4505 |
| 844 | 16 | "Prediction by the Numbers" | February 28, 2018 | 4506 |
| 845 | 17 | "Decoding the Weather Machine" | April 18, 2018 | 4507 |
| 846 | 18 | "NOVA Wonders: What Are Animals Saying?" | April 25, 2018 | NOWO 101 |
| 847 | 19 | "NOVA Wonders: What's Living in You?" | May 2, 2018 | NOWO 102 |
| 848 | 20 | "NOVA Wonders: Are We Alone?" | May 9, 2018 | NOWO 103 |
| 849 | 21 | "NOVA Wonders: Can We Build a Brain?" | May 16, 2018 | NOWO 104 |
| 850 | 22 | "NOVA Wonders: Can We Make Life?" | May 23, 2018 | NOWO 105 |
| 851 | 23 | "NOVA Wonders: What's The Universe Made Of?" | May 30, 2018 | NOWO 106 |
| 852 | 24 | "Rise of the Superstorms" | June 27, 2018 | 4508 |

=== Season 46: 2018–19 ===
| No. overall | No. in season | Title | Original release date | Prod. code |
|---|---|---|---|---|
| 853 | 1 | "Transplanting Hope" | September 26, 2018 | 4509 |
| 854 | 2 | "Operation Bridge Rescue" | October 3, 2018 | 4516 |
| 855 | 3 | "Volatile Earth: Volcano on Fire" (1 of 2) | October 10, 2018 | 4510 |
| 856 | 4 | "Volatile Earth: Volcano on the Brink" (2 of 2) | October 10, 2018 | 4511 |
| 857 | 5 | "Addiction" | October 17, 2018 | 4512 |
| 858 | 6 | "Flying Supersonic" | October 24, 2018 | 4513 |
| 859 | 7 | "Last B-24" | November 7, 2018 | 4515 |
| 860 | 8 | "Thai Cave Rescue" | November 14, 2018 | 4514 |
| 861 | 9 | "World's Fastest Animal" | November 21, 2018 | 4517 |
| 862 | 10 | "Apollo's Daring Mission" | December 26, 2018 | 4518 |
| 863 | 11 | "Pluto and Beyond" | January 2, 2019 | 4601 |
| 864 | 12 | "Einstein's Quantum Riddle" | January 9, 2019 | 4602 |
| 865 | 13 | "Kīlauea: Hawaiʻi on Fire" | January 23, 2019 | 4603 |
| 866 | 14 | "Decoding the Great Pyramid" | February 6, 2019 | 4604 |
| 867 | 15 | "Rise of the Rockets" | February 13, 2019 | 4605 |
| 868 | 16 | "The Next Pompeii" | February 20, 2019 | 4606 |
| 869 | 17 | "Saving the Dead Sea" | April 24, 2019 | 4607 |
| 870 | 18 | "Inside the Megafire" | May 8, 2019 | 4608 |
| 871 | 19 | "First Horse Warriors" | May 15, 2019 | 4609 |
| 872 | 20 | "Lost Viking Army" | May 22, 2019 | 4610 |
| 873 | 21 | "Back to the Moon" | July 10, 2019 | 4611 |
| 874 | 22 | "The Planets: Inner Worlds" | July 24, 2019 | 4612 |
| 875 | 23 | "The Planets: Mars" | July 24, 2019 | 4613 |
| 876 | 24 | "The Planets: Jupiter" | July 31, 2019 | 4614 |
| 877 | 25 | "The Planets: Saturn" | August 7, 2019 | 4615 |
| 878 | 26 | "The Planets: Ice Worlds" | August 14, 2019 | 4616 |
| 879 | 27 | "Why Bridges Collapse" | October 16, 2019 | 4618 |
| 880 | 28 | "Look Who's Driving" | October 23, 2019 | 4619 |
| 881 | 29 | "Rise of the Mammals" | October 30, 2019 | 4617 |
| 882 | 30 | "Dead Sea Scroll Detectives" | November 6, 2019 | 4620 |
| 883 | 31 | "Decoding da Vinci" | November 13, 2019 | 4621 |
| 884 | 32 | "The Violence Paradox" | November 20, 2019 | 4622 |
| 885 | 33 | "Animal Espionage" | November 27, 2019 | 4623 |

=== Season 47: 2020 ===
| No. overall | No. in season | Title | Original release date | Prod. code |
|---|---|---|---|---|
| 886 | 1 | "Polar Extremes" | February 5, 2020 | 4701 |
| 887 | 2 | "Dog Tales" | February 12, 2020 | 4702 |
| 888 | 3 | "Cat Tales" | February 19, 2020 | 4703 |
| 889 | 4 | "Mysteries of Sleep" | February 26, 2020 | 4704 |
| 890 | 5 | "Cuba's Cancer Hope" | April 1, 2020 | 4705 |
| 891 | 6 | "The Truth about Fat" | April 8, 2020 | 4706 |
| 892 | 7 | "Decoding COVID-19" | May 13, 2020 | 4710 |
| 893 | 8 | "Eagle Power" | May 20, 2020 | 4707 |
| 894 | 9 | "Human Nature" | September 9, 2020 | 4711 |
| 895 | 10 | "Secret Mind of Slime" | September 16, 2020 | 4712 |
| 896 | 11 | "A to Z: The First Alphabet" | September 23, 2020 | 4713 |
| 897 | 12 | "A to Z: How Writing Changed the World" | September 30, 2020 | 4714 |
| 898 | 13 | "Nature's Fear Factor" | October 14, 2020 | 4709 |
| 899 | 14 | "Touching the Asteroid" | October 21, 2020 | 4715 |
| 900 | 15 | "Can We Cool the Planet?" | October 28, 2020 | 4716 |
| 901 | 16 | "Saving Notre Dame" | November 25, 2020 | 4708 |

=== Season 48: 2021 ===
| No. overall | No. in season | Title | Original release date | Prod. code |
|---|---|---|---|---|
| 902 | 1 | "Secrets in Our DNA" | January 13, 2021 | 4801 |
| 903 | 2 | "Beyond the Elements: Reactions" | February 3, 2021 | 4717 |
| 904 | 3 | "Beyond the Elements: Indestructible" | February 10, 2021 | 4718 |
| 905 | 4 | "Beyond the Elements: Life" | February 17, 2021 | 4719 |
| 906 | 5 | "Looking for Life on Mars" | February 24, 2021 | 4802 |
| 907 | 6 | "Picture a Scientist" | April 14, 2021 | 4803 |
| 908 | 7 | "Reef Rescue" | April 21, 2021 | 4804 |
| 909 | 8 | "Fighting for Fertility" | May 12, 2021 | 4805 |
| 910 | 9 | "Hindenburg: The New Evidence" | May 19, 2021 | 4806 |
| 911 | 10 | "Great Electric Airplane Race" | May 26, 2021 | 4807 |
| 912 | 11 | "Ship That Changed the World" | June 2, 2021 | 4809 |
| 913 | 12 | "Bat Superpowers" | September 15, 2021 | 4810 |
| 914 | 13 | "The Cannabis Question" | September 29, 2021 | 4811 |
| 915 | 14 | "Particles Unknown" | October 6, 2021 | 4812 |
| 916 | 15 | "Arctic Drift" | October 13, 2021 | 4813 |
| 917 | 16 | "Edible Insects" | October 20, 2021 | 4814 |
| 918 | 17 | "Universe Revealed: Age of Stars" | October 27, 2021 | 4815 |
| 919 | 18 | "Universe Revealed: Milky Way" | November 3, 2021 | 4816 |
| 920 | 19 | "Universe Revealed: Alien Worlds" | November 10, 2021 | 4817 |
| 921 | 20 | "Universe Revealed: Black Holes" | November 17, 2021 | 4818 |
| 922 | 21 | "Universe Revealed: Big Bang" | November 24, 2021 | 4819 |

=== Season 49: 2022 ===
| No. overall | No. in season | Title | Original release date | Prod. code |
|---|---|---|---|---|
| 923 | 1 | "High-Risk High-Rise" | January 5, 2022 | 4808 |
| 924 | 2 | "Butterfly Blueprints" | January 12, 2022 | 4820 |
| 925 | 3 | "Alaskan Dinosaurs" | January 19, 2022 | 4821 |
| 926 | 4 | "Ancient Maya Metropolis" | January 26, 2022 | 4822 |
| 927 | 5 | "Arctic Sinkholes" | February 2, 2022 | 4901 |
| 928 | 5 | "Secrets in the Scat" | February 9, 2022 | 4902 |
| 929 | 6 | "Great Mammoth Mystery" | February 16, 2022 | 4903 |
| 930 | 7 | "Augmented" | February 23, 2022 | 4904 |
| 931 | 8 | "Determined: Fighting Alzheimer's" | April 6, 2022 | 4905 |
| 932 | 9 | "Dinosaur Apocalypse: The New Evidence" | May 11, 2022 | 4906 |
| 933 | 10 | "Dinosaur Apocalypse: The Last Day" | May 11, 2022 | 4907 |
| 934 | 11 | "Why Ships Crash" | May 18, 2022 | 4908 |
| 935 | 12 | "Ice Age Footprints" | May 25, 2022 | 4909 |
| 936 | 13 | "Ultimate Space Telescope" | July 13, 2022 | 4910 |
| 937 | 14 | "Saving Venice" | September 28, 2022 | 4912 |
| 938 | 15 | "Ending HIV in America" | October 5, 2022 | 4911 |
| 939 | 16 | "Computers v. Crime" | October 12, 2022 | 4914 |
| 940 | 17 | "Can Psychedelics Cure?" | October 19, 2022 | 4915 |
| 941 | 18 | "Ocean Invaders" | October 26, 2022 | 4916 |
| 942 | 19 | "Nazca Desert Mystery" | November 2, 2022 | 4917 |
| 943 | 20 | "Crypto Decoded" | November 9, 2022 | 4918 |
| 944 | 21 | "Zero to Infinity" | November 16, 2022 | 4919 |
| 945 | 22 | "Rebuilding Notre Dame" | December 14, 2022 | 4913 |

=== Season 50: 2023 ===
| No. overall | No. in season | Title | Original release date | Prod. code |
|---|---|---|---|---|
| 946 | 1 | "London Super Tunnel" | February 1, 2023 | 5001 |
| 947 | 2 | "Star Chasers of Senegal" | February 8, 2023 | 5002 |
| 948 | 3 | "Ancient Builders of the Amazon" | February 15, 2023 | 5003 |
| 949 | 4 | "New Eye on the Universe" | February 22, 2023 | 5004 |
| 950 | 5 | "Weathering the Future" | April 12, 2023 | 5005 |
| 951 | 6 | "Chasing Carbon Zero" | April 26, 2023 | 5006 |
| 952 | 7 | "Saving the Right Whale" | May 3, 2023 | 5007 |
| 953 | 8 | "Hidden Volcano Abyss" | May 10, 2023 | 5008 |
| 954 | 9 | "Your Brain: Perception Deception" | May 17, 2023 | 5009 |
| 955 | 10 | "Your Brain: Who's in Control?" | May 24, 2023 | 5010 |
| 956 | 11 | "Ancient Earth: Birth of the Sky" | October 4, 2023 | 5011 |
| 957 | 12 | "Ancient Earth: Frozen" | October 11, 2023 | 5012 |
| 958 | 13 | "Ancient Earth: Life Rising" | October 18, 2023 | 5013 |
| 959 | 14 | "Ancient Earth: Inferno" | October 25, 2023 | 5014 |
| 960 | 15 | "Ancient Earth: Humans" | November 1, 2023 | 5015 |
| 961 | 16 | "Inside China's Tech Boom" | November 8, 2023 | 5016 |
| 962 | 17 | "The Battle to Beat Malaria" | November 15, 2023 | 5017 |
| 963 | 18 | "Lee and Liza's Family Tree" | November 22, 2023 | 5018 |

=== Season 51: 2024 ===
| No. overall | No. in season | Title | Original release date | Prod. code |
|---|---|---|---|---|
| 964 | 1 | "When Whales Could Walk" | January 31, 2024 | 5101 |
| 965 | 2 | "Easter Island Origins" | February 7, 2024 | 5102 |
| 966 | 3 | "Building the Eiffel Tower" | February 14, 2024 | 5103 |
| 967 | 4 | "Hunt for the Oldest DNA" | February 21, 2024 | 5104 |
| 968 | 5 | "A.I. Revolution" | March 27, 2024 | 5105 |
| 969 | 6 | "Great American Eclipse" | April 3, 2024 | 5106 |
| 970 | 7 | "Secrets in Your Data" | May 15, 2024 | 5107 |
| 971 | 8 | "Decoding the Universe: Cosmos" | May 22, 2024 | 5108 |
| 972 | 9 | "Sea Change: Bounty in the Gulf of Maine" (1 of 3) | July 24, 2024 | SC 101 |
| 973 | 10 | "Sea Change: Peril in the Gulf of Maine" (2 of 3) | July 31, 2024 | SC 102 |
| 974 | 11 | "Sea Change: Survival in the Gulf of Maine" (3 of 3) | August 7, 2024 | SC 103 |
| 975 | 12 | "Solar System: Storm Worlds" | October 2, 2024 | 5109 |
| 976 | 13 | "Solar System: Strange Worlds" | October 9, 2024 | 5110 |
| 977 | 14 | "Solar System: Volcano Worlds" | October 16, 2024 | 5111 |
| 978 | 15 | "Solar System: Icy Worlds" | October 23, 2024 | 5112 |
| 979 | 16 | "Solar System: Wandering Worlds" | October 30, 2024 | 5113 |
| 980 | 17 | "Decoding the Universe: Quantum" | November 6, 2024 | 5114 |
| 981 | 18 | "Building Stuff: Boost It!" | November 13, 2024 | 5115 |
| 982 | 19 | "Building Stuff: Reach It!" | November 20, 2024 | 5116 |
| 983 | 20 | "Building Stuff: Change It!" | November 27, 2024 | 5117 |
| 984 | 21 | "Lost Tombs of Notre Dame" | December 18, 2024 | 5118 |

=== Season 52: 2025 ===
| No. overall | No. in season | Title | Original release date | Prod. code |
|---|---|---|---|---|
| 985 | 1 | "What Are UFOs?" | January 22, 2025 | 5201 |
| 986 | 2 | "Extreme Airport Engineering" | January 29, 2025 | 5202 |
| 987 | 3 | "Dino Birds" | February 5, 2025 | 5203 |
| 988 | 4 | "Egypt's Tombs of Amun" | February 12, 2025 | 5204 |
| 989 | 5 | "Pompeii's Secret Underworld" | February 19, 2025 | 5205 |
| 990 | 6 | "Baltimore Bridge Collapse" | February 26, 2025 | 5206 |
| 991 | 7 | "Revolutionary War Weapons" | April 9, 2025 | 5207 |
| 992 | 8 | "Secrets of the Forest" | April 16, 2025 | 5208 |
| 993 | 9 | "Critical Condition: Health in Black America" | April 30, 2025 | 5209 |
| 994 | 10 | "Ultimate Crash Test: Countdown" | May 7, 2025 | 5210 |
| 995 | 11 | "Ultimate Crash Test: Impact" | May 14, 2025 | 5211 |
| 996 | 12 | "Human: Origins" | September 17, 2025 | 5212 |
| 997 | 13 | "Human: Journeys" | September 24, 2025 | 5213 |
| 998 | 14 | "Human: Neanderthal Encounters" | October 1, 2025 | 5214 |
| 999 | 15 | "Human: Into the Americas" | October 8, 2025 | 5215 |
| 1000 | 16 | "Human: Building Empires" | October 15, 2025 | 5216 |
| 1001 | 17 | "Ancient Desert Death Trap" | October 22, 2025 | 5217 |
| 1002 | 18 | "Superfloods" | October 29, 2025 | 5218 |
| 1003 | 19 | "Operation Space Station: High-Risk Build" | November 5, 2025 | 5219 |
| 1004 | 20 | "Operation Space Station: Science and Survival" | November 12, 2025 | 5220 |

=== Season 53: 2026 ===
| No. overall | No. in season | Title | Original release date | Prod. code |
|---|---|---|---|---|
| 1005 | 1 | "Asteroids: Spark of Life?" | January 21, 2026 | 5301 |
| 1006 | 2 | "Angkor: Hidden Jungle Empire" | January 28, 2026 | 5302 |
| 1007 | 3 | "Can Dogs Talk?" | February 4, 2026 | 5303 |
| 1008 | 4 | "Mammal Origins" | February 11, 2026 | 5304 |
| 1009 | 5 | "Stone Age Temple Mystery" | February 25, 2026 | 5306 |
| 1010 | 6 | "Return to the Moon" | April 15, 2026 | 5308 |
| 1011 | 7 | "Rain Bombs" | April 22, 2026 | 5305 |
| 1012 | 8 | "Athens: Birth of Democracy" | April 29, 2026 | 5307 |
| 1013 | 9 | "The Battle To Breathe" | September 16, 2026 | 5309 |
| 1014 | 10 | "Knowledge Keepers" | September 23, 2026 | 5310 |
| 1015 | 11 | "Stone Age Masterpiece" | September 30, 2026 | 5311 |
| 1016 | 12 | "Space Wars" | October 7, 2026 | 5312 |
| 1017 | 13 | "Evolution: Brain Power" | October 14, 2026 | 5313 |
| 1018 | 14 | "Evolution: Need To Feed" | October 21, 2026 | 5314 |
| 1019 | 15 | "Evolution: Body Builders" | October 28, 2026 | 5315 |
| 1020 | 16 | "Evolution: The Mating Game" | November 4, 2026 | 5316 |
| 1021 | 17 | "Evolution: On The Run" | November 11, 2026 | 5317 |

== Sources ==
- "Nova – Past Television Programs". PBS. Retrieved on 20 December 2009
- "PBS.ORG Press Room Archived January 16, 2009, at the Wayback Machine". Retrieved on 22 February 2013
- "OpenVault from WGBH, Boston listings for Nova Episodes Archived March 22, 2022, at the Wayback Machine"
