= List of Nova episodes (seasons 41–present) =

Nova is an American science documentary television series produced by WGBH Boston for PBS. Some episodes were not originally produced for PBS, but were acquired from other sources such as the BBC. Most episodes are 60-minutes long.

== Episodes ==
=== Season 41: 2013–14 ===
| No. overall | No. in season | Title | Original release date | Prod. code |
|---|---|---|---|---|
| 746 | 1 | "Ground Zero Supertower" | September 11, 2013 | 4016 |
| 747 | 2 | "Megastorm Aftermath" | October 9, 2013 | 4017 |
| 748 | 3 | "Making Stuff Faster" | October 16, 2013 | 4018 |
| 749 | 4 | "Making Stuff Wilder" | October 23, 2013 | 4019 |
| 750 | 5 | "Making Stuff Colder" | October 30, 2013 | 4020 |
| 751 | 6 | "Making Stuff Safer" | November 6, 2013 | 4021 |
| 752 | 7 | "Cold Case JFK" | November 13, 2013 | 4022 |
| 753 | 8 | "At the Edge of Space" | November 20, 2013 | 4023 |
| 754 | 9 | "Asteroid: Doomsday or Payday?" | November 20, 2013 | 4024 |
| 755 | 10 | "Alien Planets Revealed" | January 8, 2014 | 4101 |
| 756 | 11 | "Zeppelin Terror Attack" | January 15, 2014 | 4102 |
| 757 | 12 | "Killer Typhoon" | January 22, 2014 | 4106 |
| 758 | 13 | "Ghosts of Murdered Kings" | January 29, 2014 | 4103 |
| 759 | 14 | "Roman Catacomb Mystery" | February 5, 2014 | 4104 |
| 760 | 15 | "Great Cathedral Mystery" | February 12, 2014 | 4105 |
| 761 | 16 | "Wild Predator Invasion" | April 2, 2014 | 4107 |
| 762 | 17 | "Inside Animal Minds: Bird Genius" | April 9, 2014 | 4108 |
| 763 | 18 | "Inside Animal Minds: Dogs & Super Senses" | April 16, 2014 | 4109 |
| 764 | 19 | "Inside Animal Minds: Who's the Smartest?" | April 23, 2014 | 4110 |
| 765 | 20 | "Why Sharks Attack" | May 7, 2014 | 4111 |
| 766 | 21 | "Escape From Nazi Alcatraz" | May 14, 2014 | 4112 |
| 767 | 22 | "D-Day's Sunken Secrets" | May 28, 2014 | 4113 |

=== Season 42: 2014–15 ===
| No. overall | No. in season | Title | Original release date | Prod. code |
|---|---|---|---|---|
| 768 | 1 | "Vaccines—Calling The Shots" | September 10, 2014 | 4114 |
| 769 | 2 | "Rise of the Hackers" | September 24, 2014 | 4115 |
Our lives are going digital. We shop, bank, and even date online. Computers hold our treasured photographs, private emails, and all of our personal information. This data is precious—and cybercriminals want it. Now, NOVA goes behind-the-scenes of the fast-paced world of cryptography to meet the scientists battling to keep our data safe. They are experts in extreme physics, math, and a new field called "ultra-paranoid computing", all working to forge unbreakable codes and build ultra-fast computers. From the sleuths who decoded the world's most advanced cyber weapon to scientists who believe they can store a password in your unconscious brain, NOVA investigates how a new global geek squad is harnessing cutting-edge science, all to stay one step ahead of the hackers.
| 770 | 3 | "Why Planes Vanish" | October 8, 2014 | 4116 |
Traces the timeline of Malaysia Airlines Flight 370, a commercial flight which disappeared on March 8, 2014, without any tangible evidence left behind. The episode explores the technologies behind the tracking of aircraft, possible causes for Flight 370's disappearance, and technologies that would prevent another aircraft from disappearing. Notes: Renarrated version of the BBC Horizon episode, "Where's The Flight MH370?" Narrated by the PBS NewsHour science correspondent Miles O'Brien.
| 771 | 4 | "Surviving Ebola" | October 8, 2014 | 4123 |
Explores the spread of the Ebola virus outbreak in West Africa which began in December 2013; the discovery and pathology of the Ebola virus; and the development and use of ZMapp, an experimental drug for the Ebola virus which was first administered to humans infected during the outbreak. A man infected with the virus and whose story featured during the last few minutes of the program died on the day it first aired.
| 772 | 5 | "Ben Franklin's Balloons" | October 22, 2014 | 4117 |
| 773 | 6 | "First Air War" | October 29, 2014 | 4118 |
| 774 | 7 | "Bigger Than T. rex" | November 5, 2014 | 4119 |
| 775 | 8 | "Emperor's Ghost Army" | November 12, 2014 | 4120 |
A new archaeological campaign is probing the thousands of figures entombed in the mausoleum. With exclusive access to pioneering research, this program reveals how the Emperor directed the manufacture of the tens of thousands of bronze weapons carried by the clay soldiers, as well as lethal crossbows engineered with astonishing precision. NOVA tests the power of these weapons with high-action experiments and reports on revolutionary 3D computer modeling techniques that are revealing new insights into how the clay figures were made. The program reveals the secrets of one of archaeology's greatest discoveries and brings to life the startlingly sophisticated world of Qin's legendary empire.
| 776 | 9 | "Killer Landslides" | November 19, 2014 | 4121 |
| 777 | 10 | "First Man on the Moon" | December 3, 2014 | 4122 |
| 778 | 11 | "Big Bang Machine" | January 14, 2015 | 4201 |
| 779 | 12 | "Sunken Ship Rescue" | January 21, 2015 | 4202 |
| 780 | 13 | "Sinkholes: Buried Alive" | January 28, 2015 | 4203 |
| 781 | 14 | "Colosseum: Roman Death Trap" | February 11, 2015 | 4206 |
| 782 | 15 | "Petra: Lost City of Stone" | February 18, 2015 | 4205 |
| 783 | 16 | "Hagia Sophia: Istanbul's Mystery" | February 25, 2015 | 4204 |
| 784 | 17 | "The Great Math Mystery" | April 15, 2015 | 4207 |
| 785 | 18 | "Invisible Universe Revealed" | April 22, 2015 | 4208 |
| 786 | 19 | "Nazi Attack on America" | May 6, 2015 | 4210 |
| 787 | 20 | "Lethal Seas" | May 13, 2015 | 4211 |
| 788 | 21 | "Chasing Pluto" | July 15, 2015 | 4213 |
| 789 | 22 | "Nuclear Meltdown Disaster" | July 29, 2015 | 4214 |

=== Season 43: 2015–16 ===
| No. overall | No. in season | Title | Original release date | Prod. code |
|---|---|---|---|---|
| 790 | 1 | "Dawn of Humanity" | September 16, 2015 | 4209, 4215 |
The discovery of ancient fossils of human ancestors in a South African cave is highlighted.
| 791 | 2 | "Arctic Ghost Ship" | September 23, 2015 | 4216 |
In 1845, British explorer Sir John Franklin set off to chart the elusive Northwest Passage, commanding 128 men in two robust and well-stocked Royal Navy ships, the Erebus and Terror. They were never heard from again. Eventually, searchers found tantalising clues to their fate: a hastily written note left on an island, exhumed bodies suggesting lead poisoning, discarded human bones with marks of cannibalism and Inuit legends of ghost ships. But no trace of the ships was ever found. Then, in 2014, after seven years of searching, an official Parks Canada expedition finally located the Erebus, intact and upright on the sea floor. NOVA tells the gripping story of the ill-fated expedition and reveals exclusive new clues from the sea floor that may finally unravel what happened to Franklin's men more than 160 years ago.
| 792 | 3 | "Secrets of Noah's Ark" | October 7, 2015 | 4212 |
A 3,700-year-old inscribed clay tablet reveals a surprising new version of the Biblical flood story.
| 793 | 4 | "Cyberwar Threat" | October 14, 2015 | 4217 |
Thanks in part to the documents released by Edward Snowden, the true scale of the National Security Agency's scope and power is coming to light. Besides spending billions to ingest and analyze the world's electronic communications, the NSA has set out to dominate a new battlefield – cyberspace. NOVA examines the science and technology behind cyber warfare and asks if we are already in the midst of a deadly new arms race.
| 794 | 5 | "Animal Mummies" | October 28, 2015 | 4219 |
Hi-tech images reveal the role of animal mummies in ancient Egyptian beliefs.
| 795 | 6 | "Making North America: Origins" (1 of 3) | November 4, 2015 | 4220 |
| 796 | 7 | "Making North America: Life" (2 of 3) | November 11, 2015 | 4221 |
| 797 | 8 | "Making North America: Human" (3 of 3) | November 18, 2015 | 4222 |
| 798 | 9 | "Inside Einstein's Mind" | November 25, 2015 | 4223 |
Einstein's simple but powerful ideas that reshaped our understanding of gravity are examined.
| 799 | 10 | "Secret Tunnel Warfare" | January 6, 2016 | 4301 |
During WWI, the Allies devised a devastating plan, planting 600 tons of explosives in secret tunnels driven under German trenches. Uncover traces of the operation and learn why it failed to break the lethal deadlock of trench warfare.
| 800 | 11 | "Life's Rocky Start" | January 13, 2016 | 4302 |
From the first sparks of life to the survival of the fittest, unearth the secret relationship between rocks and life. Investigate how minerals are vital to the origins and evolution of life.
| 801 | 12 | "Mystery Beneath the Ice" | January 20, 2016 | 4303 |
Dive under the ice to explore Antarctica's under-ice landscape with a team of scientists as they search for the mystery killer that's decimating the population of delicate shrimp-like creatures at the foundation of the Antarctic food chain.
| 802 | 13 | "Himalayan Megaquake" | January 27, 2016 | 4304 |
NOVA documents the April 25, 2015 7.8-magnitude earthquake that ripped through Nepal shaking Mount Everest and unwraps the science behind such deadly earthquakes.
| 803 | 14 | "Creatures of Light" | February 3, 2016 | 4309 |
| 804 | 15 | "Memory Hackers" | February 10, 2016 | 4307 |
Explore the secrets of the mind to discover how memories can be implanted, changed and even erased.
| 805 | 16 | "Iceman Reborn" | February 17, 2016 | 4305 |
New revelations about the ancient ice mummy, Otzi, shed light on the dawn of civilization in Europe.
| 806 | 17 | "Rise of the Robots" | February 24, 2016 | 4306 |
Join the race to build the most advanced humanoid robots as they battle real-world challenges.
| 807 | 18 | "Vikings Unearthed" | April 6, 2016 | 4310 |
Please add a Plot Summary here, as per WP:PLOTSUM & MOS:TVPLOT. Note: Co-production with the BBC, first aired in the UK on 4 April 2016, as the title "Vikings Uncovered".
| 808 | 19 | "Can Alzheimer's Be Stopped?" | April 13, 2016 | 4308 |
| 809 | 20 | "Wild Ways" | April 20, 2016 | 4311 |
| 810 | 21 | "Operation Lighthouse Rescue" | May 4, 2016 | 4313 |
| 811 | 22 | "Bombing Hitler's Supergun" | May 11, 2016 | 4314 |

=== Season 44: 2016–17 ===
| No. overall | No. in season | Title | Original release date | Prod. code |
|---|---|---|---|---|
| 812 | 1 | "15 Years of Terror" | September 7, 2016 | 4316 |
| 813 | 2 | "School of the Future" | September 14, 2016 | 4315 |
| 814 | 3 | "Great Human Odyssey" | October 5, 2016 | 4312 |
| 815 | 4 | "Super Tunnel" | October 12, 2016 | 4317 |
Engineers and designers building Crossrail, a subterranean railway in London.
| 816 | 5 | "Treasures of the Earth: Gems" (1 of 3) | November 2, 2016 | 4318 |
Precious gems such as diamonds, rubies, emeralds, opal, and jade are among Earth's ultimate treasures.
| 817 | 6 | "Treasures of the Earth: Metals" (2 of 3) | November 9, 2016 | 4319 |
Metals such as gold, copper, tin, and steel are among Earth's treasures.
| 818 | 7 | "Treasures of the Earth: Power" (3 of 3) | November 16, 2016 | 4320 |
| 819 | 8 | "Secrets of the Sky Tombs" | January 4, 2017 | 4401 |
At Kyang in the upper Mustang valley of Nepal, investigators and explorers study the cliff tombs of early human settlers from around 200 BC.
| 820 | 9 | "The Nuclear Option" | January 11, 2017 | 4402 |
| 821 | 10 | "Search for the Super Battery" | February 1, 2017 | 4403 |
| 822 | 12 | "Ultimate Cruise Ship" | February 8, 2017 | 4404 |
| 823 | 13 | "The Origami Revolution" | February 15, 2017 | 4405 |
| 824 | 14 | "Why Trains Crash" | February 22, 2017 | 4406 |
| 825 | 15 | "Holocaust Escape Tunnel" | April 19, 2017 | 4407 |
| 826 | 16 | "Building Chernobyl's MegaTomb" | April 26, 2017 | 4408 |
Engineers race to construct a gargantuan dome to contain radioactive materials of the Chernobyl nuclear reactor.
| 827 | 17 | "Chinese Chariot Revealed" | May 17, 2017 | 4409 |
| 828 | 18 | "Poisoned Water" | May 31, 2017 | 4410 |
Investigates the water disaster in Flint, Michigan.

=== Season 45: 2017–18 ===
| No. overall | No. in season | Title | Original release date | Prod. code |
|---|---|---|---|---|
| 829 | 1 | "Eclipse Over America" | August 21, 2017 | 4411 |
Americans witness the solar eclipse on August 21, 2017.
| 830 | 2 | "Death Dive to Saturn" | September 13, 2017 | 4412 |
The Cassini space probe attempts to dive between the innermost ring and top of Saturn's atmosphere.
| 831 | 3 | "Secrets of the Shining Knight" | October 4, 2017 | 4413 |
A look at how medieval armour would have been constructed, and how it affected the way knights fought. Based on a reconstruction of modern Greenwich armour.
| 832 | 4 | "Ghosts of Stonehenge" | October 11, 2017 | 4414 |
Archaeological digs reveal new clues as to who built Stonehenge and why.
| 833 | 5 | "Secrets of the Forbidden City" | October 18, 2017 | 4415 |
| 834 | 6 | "Killer Volcanoes" | October 25, 2017 | 4416 |
| 835 | 7 | "Killer Hurricanes" | November 1, 2017 | 4417 |
| 836 | 8 | "Killer Floods" | November 8, 2017 | 4418 |
| 837 | 9 | "Extreme Animal Weapons" | November 22, 2017 | 4419 |
| 838 | 10 | "Bird Brain" | December 20, 2017 | 4420 |
Scientists test avian aptitude with brainteasers that reveal acute intelligence.
| 839 | 11 | "Day The Dinosaurs Died" | December 27, 2017 | 4421 |
Scientists discover new clues as to the catastrophe that ended the reign of the dinosaurs on Earth.
| 840 | 12 | "Black Hole Apocalypse" | January 10, 2018 | 4501, 4502 |
Note: Originally aired with "Black Hole Universe" as a 2-hour combined episode.
| 841 | 13 | "The Impossible Flight" | January 31, 2018 | 4503 |
| 842 | 14 | "First Face of America" | February 7, 2018 | 4504 |
| 843 | 15 | "Great Escape at Dunkirk" | February 14, 2018 | 4505 |
| 844 | 16 | "Prediction by the Numbers" | February 28, 2018 | 4506 |
With the growth of digital technology and the internet, the science of forecasting is flourishing. From sports to the morning commute, predictions underlie nearly every aspect of daily life, but not all predictions come true.
| 845 | 17 | "Decoding the Weather Machine" | April 18, 2018 | 4507 |
| 846 | 18 | "NOVA Wonders: What Are Animals Saying?" | April 25, 2018 | NOWO 101 |
| 847 | 19 | "NOVA Wonders: What's Living in You?" | May 2, 2018 | NOWO 102 |
| 848 | 20 | "NOVA Wonders: Are We Alone?" | May 9, 2018 | NOWO 103 |
| 849 | 21 | "NOVA Wonders: Can We Build a Brain?" | May 16, 2018 | NOWO 104 |
| 850 | 22 | "NOVA Wonders: Can We Make Life?" | May 23, 2018 | NOWO 105 |
| 851 | 23 | "NOVA Wonders: What's The Universe Made Of?" | May 30, 2018 | NOWO 106 |
| 852 | 24 | "Rise of the Superstorms" | June 27, 2018 | 4508 |
The 2017 hurricane season brings devastation to Houston and throughout the Caribbean.

=== Season 46: 2018–19 ===
| No. overall | No. in season | Title | Original release date | Prod. code |
|---|---|---|---|---|
| 853 | 1 | "Transplanting Hope" | September 26, 2018 | 4509 |
| 854 | 2 | "Operation Bridge Rescue" | October 3, 2018 | 4516 |
| 855 | 3 | "Volatile Earth: Volcano on Fire" (1 of 2) | October 10, 2018 | 4510 |
Climb up the cone of Nyiragongo, one of the world's least studied volcanoes, and join volcanologists as they descend into its crater, down towards its bubbling and seething lava lake, to discover when it will erupt next.
| 856 | 4 | "Volatile Earth: Volcano on the Brink" (2 of 2) | October 10, 2018 | 4511 |
Join a team of volcanologists as they explore Nyamuragira, one of the world's most active and mysterious volcanoes in central Africa. Learn what feeds its frequent eruptions and see the region's other hidden, life-threatening volcanic dangers.
| 857 | 5 | "Addiction" | October 17, 2018 | 4512 |
| 858 | 6 | "Flying Supersonic" | October 24, 2018 | 4513 |
| 859 | 7 | "Last B-24" | November 7, 2018 | 4515 |
| 860 | 8 | "Thai Cave Rescue" | November 14, 2018 | 4514 |
| 861 | 9 | "World's Fastest Animal" | November 21, 2018 | 4517 |
| 862 | 10 | "Apollo's Daring Mission" | December 26, 2018 | 4518 |
Apollo astronauts and engineers tell the inside story of Apollo 8, the first crewed mission to (orbit) the Moon. The U.S. space program suffered a bitter setback when Apollo 1 ended in a deadly fire during a pre-launch run-through. In disarray, and threatened by the prospect of a Soviet Union victory in the space race, NASA decided upon a radical and risky change of plan: turn Apollo 8 from an Earth-orbit mission into a daring sprint to the Moon while relying on untried new technologies. Fifty years after the historic mission, the Apollo 8 astronauts and engineers recount the feats of engineering that paved the way to the Moon.
| 863 | 11 | "Pluto and Beyond" | January 2, 2019 | 4601 |
The New Horizons spacecraft attempts to fly by 486958 Arrokoth (2014 MU_{69}), a mysterious object that NASA nicknamed Ultima Thule. NOVA is embedded with the spacecraft mission team, following the action in real-time as they uncover the secrets of what lies beyond Pluto. The episode ends after New Horizons successful flyby, ending with an image of Ultima Thule captured by the probe. The 2015 NOVA episode "Chasing Pluto" was about this spacecraft and its Pluto approach.
| 864 | 12 | "Einstein's Quantum Riddle" | January 9, 2019 | 4602 |
| 865 | 13 | "Kīlauea: Hawaiʻi on Fire" | January 23, 2019 | 4603 |
| 866 | 14 | "Decoding the Great Pyramid" | February 6, 2019 | 4604 |
The latest archeological research that has transformed our understanding about the construction of the Great Pyramid of Giza, including the logbook of a labor team that transported limestone blocks and a "lost city" that revealed intimate details of the lives of the laborers and officials.
| 867 | 15 | "Rise of the Rockets" | February 13, 2019 | 4605 |
NOVA explores the latest rocket technologies of NASA and private companies and explores the growing role that private citizens may have in space.
| 868 | 16 | "The Next Pompeii" | February 20, 2019 | 4606 |
| 869 | 17 | "Saving the Dead Sea" | April 24, 2019 | 4607 |
| 870 | 18 | "Inside the Megafire" | May 8, 2019 | 4608 |
| 871 | 19 | "First Horse Warriors" | May 15, 2019 | 4609 |
| 872 | 20 | "Lost Viking Army" | May 22, 2019 | 4610 |
| 873 | 21 | "Back to the Moon" | July 10, 2019 | 4611 |
Fifty years after Apollo 11, new scientific discoveries are fueling excitement for a return to the lunar surface—this time, perhaps, to stay.
| 874 | 22 | "The Planets: Inner Worlds" | July 24, 2019 | 4612 |
| 875 | 23 | "The Planets: Mars" | July 24, 2019 | 4613 |
| 876 | 24 | "The Planets: Jupiter" | July 31, 2019 | 4614 |
| 877 | 25 | "The Planets: Saturn" | August 7, 2019 | 4615 |
| 878 | 26 | "The Planets: Ice Worlds" | August 14, 2019 | 4616 |
| 879 | 27 | "Why Bridges Collapse" | October 16, 2019 | 4618 |
Investigate deadly bridge collapses and how new engineering techniques can make bridges safer.
| 880 | 28 | "Look Who's Driving" | October 23, 2019 | 4619 |
Self-driving cars may one day be big business, but will they ever be safer than human drivers?
| 881 | 29 | "Rise of the Mammals" | October 30, 2019 | 4617 |
Fossils show how mammals emerged when dinosaurs went extinct after the Chicxulub impactor.
| 882 | 30 | "Dead Sea Scroll Detectives" | November 6, 2019 | 4620 |
| 883 | 31 | "Decoding da Vinci" | November 13, 2019 | 4621 |
| 884 | 32 | "The Violence Paradox" | November 20, 2019 | 4622 |
Can physical violence be prevented—or is it simply part of human nature? This episode goes on a journey through history and the human mind to explore what triggers violence and examines evidence-based approaches to making the world more peaceful.
| 885 | 33 | "Animal Espionage" | November 27, 2019 | 4623 |

=== Season 47: 2020 ===
| No. overall | No. in season | Title | Original release date | Prod. code |
|---|---|---|---|---|
| 886 | 1 | "Polar Extremes" | February 5, 2020 | 4701 |
| 887 | 2 | "Dog Tales" | February 12, 2020 | 4702 |
| 888 | 3 | "Cat Tales" | February 19, 2020 | 4703 |
| 889 | 4 | "Mysteries of Sleep" | February 26, 2020 | 4704 |
| 890 | 5 | "Cuba's Cancer Hope" | April 1, 2020 | 4705 |
Cuban scientists develop their own biotech industry, including lung cancer vaccines that may give new hope to patients around the world.
| 891 | 6 | "The Truth about Fat" | April 8, 2020 | 4706 |
Exploring the complex functions of fat and the role it plays in controlling hunger, hormones and reproduction.
| 892 | 7 | "Decoding COVID-19" | May 13, 2020 | 4710 |
Scientists race to understand and defeat SARS-CoV-2. The first six months of the COVID-19 pandemic are detailed.
| 893 | 8 | "Eagle Power" | May 20, 2020 | 4707 |
| 894 | 9 | "Human Nature" | September 9, 2020 | 4711 |
| 895 | 10 | "Secret Mind of Slime" | September 16, 2020 | 4712 |
| 896 | 11 | "A to Z: The First Alphabet" | September 23, 2020 | 4713 |
| 897 | 12 | "A to Z: How Writing Changed the World" | September 30, 2020 | 4714 |
| 898 | 13 | "Nature's Fear Factor" | October 14, 2020 | 4709 |
| 899 | 14 | "Touching the Asteroid" | October 21, 2020 | 4715 |
| 900 | 15 | "Can We Cool the Planet?" | October 28, 2020 | 4716 |
| 901 | 16 | "Saving Notre Dame" | November 25, 2020 | 4708 |

=== Season 48: 2021 ===
| No. overall | No. in season | Title | Original release date | Prod. code |
|---|---|---|---|---|
| 902 | 1 | "Secrets in Our DNA" | January 13, 2021 | 4801 |
The value of DNA testing and the risks of entrusting this private data to commercial enterprises and online databases.
| 903 | 2 | "Beyond the Elements: Reactions" | February 3, 2021 | 4717 |
| 904 | 3 | "Beyond the Elements: Indestructible" | February 10, 2021 | 4718 |
| 905 | 4 | "Beyond the Elements: Life" | February 17, 2021 | 4719 |
| 906 | 5 | "Looking for Life on Mars" | February 24, 2021 | 4802 |
NASA launches the Mars 2020 Mission to search for signs of life on Mars; the mission marks the first time a rover will land in Jezero Crater, an ancient river delta known to be one of the most dangerous areas for a spacecraft to land.
| 907 | 6 | "Picture a Scientist" | April 14, 2021 | 4803 |
| 908 | 7 | "Reef Rescue" | April 21, 2021 | 4804 |
| 909 | 8 | "Fighting for Fertility" | May 12, 2021 | 4805 |
Couples navigate in vitro fertilization (IVF), mosaic embryos and other options for having a baby in the fight for fertility. Barriers include social, biological, and current technologies.
| 910 | 9 | "Hindenburg: The New Evidence" | May 19, 2021 | 4806 |
A new investigation into the 1937 Hindenburg disaster includes a novel set of experiments that tests scenarios that may have led to the Hindenburg's ignition.
| 911 | 10 | "Great Electric Airplane Race" | May 26, 2021 | 4807 |
| 912 | 11 | "Ship That Changed the World" | June 2, 2021 | 4809 |
The discovery of a European ship dating back to the 15th century, Gribshunden, may provide physical evidence of engineering breakthroughs that helped create the modern world.
| 913 | 12 | "Bat Superpowers" | September 15, 2021 | 4810 |
| 914 | 13 | "The Cannabis Question" | September 29, 2021 | 4811 |
| 915 | 14 | "Particles Unknown" | October 6, 2021 | 4812 |
| 916 | 15 | "Arctic Drift" | October 13, 2021 | 4813 |
| 917 | 16 | "Edible Insects" | October 20, 2021 | 4814 |
| 918 | 17 | "Universe Revealed: Age of Stars" | October 27, 2021 | 4815 |
| 919 | 18 | "Universe Revealed: Milky Way" | November 3, 2021 | 4816 |
| 920 | 19 | "Universe Revealed: Alien Worlds" | November 10, 2021 | 4817 |
| 921 | 20 | "Universe Revealed: Black Holes" | November 17, 2021 | 4818 |
| 922 | 21 | "Universe Revealed: Big Bang" | November 24, 2021 | 4819 |

=== Season 49: 2022 ===
| No. overall | No. in season | Title | Original release date | Prod. code |
|---|---|---|---|---|
| 923 | 1 | "High-Risk High-Rise" | January 5, 2022 | 4808 |
| 924 | 2 | "Butterfly Blueprints" | January 12, 2022 | 4820 |
| 925 | 3 | "Alaskan Dinosaurs" | January 19, 2022 | 4821 |
| 926 | 4 | "Ancient Maya Metropolis" | January 26, 2022 | 4822 |
| 927 | 5 | "Arctic Sinkholes" | February 2, 2022 | 4901 |
| 928 | 5 | "Secrets in the Scat" | February 9, 2022 | 4902 |
| 929 | 6 | "Great Mammoth Mystery" | February 16, 2022 | 4903 |
| 930 | 7 | "Augmented" | February 23, 2022 | 4904 |
| 931 | 8 | "Determined: Fighting Alzheimer's" | April 6, 2022 | 4905 |
| 932 | 9 | "Dinosaur Apocalypse: The New Evidence" | May 11, 2022 | 4906 |
| 933 | 10 | "Dinosaur Apocalypse: The Last Day" | May 11, 2022 | 4907 |
| 934 | 11 | "Why Ships Crash" | May 18, 2022 | 4908 |
| 935 | 12 | "Ice Age Footprints" | May 25, 2022 | 4909 |
| 936 | 13 | "Ultimate Space Telescope" | July 13, 2022 | 4910 |
| 937 | 14 | "Saving Venice" | September 28, 2022 | 4912 |
| 938 | 15 | "Ending HIV in America" | October 5, 2022 | 4911 |
| 939 | 16 | "Computers v. Crime" | October 12, 2022 | 4914 |
| 940 | 17 | "Can Psychedelics Cure?" | October 19, 2022 | 4915 |
| 941 | 18 | "Ocean Invaders" | October 26, 2022 | 4916 |
| 942 | 19 | "Nazca Desert Mystery" | November 2, 2022 | 4917 |
| 943 | 20 | "Crypto Decoded" | November 9, 2022 | 4918 |
| 944 | 21 | "Zero to Infinity" | November 16, 2022 | 4919 |
| 945 | 22 | "Rebuilding Notre Dame" | December 14, 2022 | 4913 |

=== Season 50: 2023 ===
| No. overall | No. in season | Title | Original release date | Prod. code |
|---|---|---|---|---|
| 946 | 1 | "London Super Tunnel" | February 1, 2023 | 5001 |
| 947 | 2 | "Star Chasers of Senegal" | February 8, 2023 | 5002 |
| 948 | 3 | "Ancient Builders of the Amazon" | February 15, 2023 | 5003 |
| 949 | 4 | "New Eye on the Universe" | February 22, 2023 | 5004 |
| 950 | 5 | "Weathering the Future" | April 12, 2023 | 5005 |
| 951 | 6 | "Chasing Carbon Zero" | April 26, 2023 | 5006 |
| 952 | 7 | "Saving the Right Whale" | May 3, 2023 | 5007 |
| 953 | 8 | "Hidden Volcano Abyss" | May 10, 2023 | 5008 |
| 954 | 9 | "Your Brain: Perception Deception" | May 17, 2023 | 5009 |
| 955 | 10 | "Your Brain: Who's in Control?" | May 24, 2023 | 5010 |
| 956 | 11 | "Ancient Earth: Birth of the Sky" | October 4, 2023 | 5011 |
| 957 | 12 | "Ancient Earth: Frozen" | October 11, 2023 | 5012 |
| 958 | 13 | "Ancient Earth: Life Rising" | October 18, 2023 | 5013 |
| 959 | 14 | "Ancient Earth: Inferno" | October 25, 2023 | 5014 |
| 960 | 15 | "Ancient Earth: Humans" | November 1, 2023 | 5015 |
| 961 | 16 | "Inside China's Tech Boom" | November 8, 2023 | 5016 |
| 962 | 17 | "The Battle to Beat Malaria" | November 15, 2023 | 5017 |
| 963 | 18 | "Lee and Liza's Family Tree" | November 22, 2023 | 5018 |

=== Season 51: 2024 ===
| No. overall | No. in season | Title | Original release date | Prod. code |
|---|---|---|---|---|
| 964 | 1 | "When Whales Could Walk" | January 31, 2024 | 5101 |
| 965 | 2 | "Easter Island Origins" | February 7, 2024 | 5102 |
| 966 | 3 | "Building the Eiffel Tower" | February 14, 2024 | 5103 |
| 967 | 4 | "Hunt for the Oldest DNA" | February 21, 2024 | 5104 |
| 968 | 5 | "A.I. Revolution" | March 27, 2024 | 5105 |
| 969 | 6 | "Great American Eclipse" | April 3, 2024 | 5106 |
| 970 | 7 | "Secrets in Your Data" | May 15, 2024 | 5107 |
| 971 | 8 | "Decoding the Universe: Cosmos" | May 22, 2024 | 5108 |
| 972 | 9 | "Sea Change: Bounty in the Gulf of Maine" (1 of 3) | July 24, 2024 | SC 101 |
| 973 | 10 | "Sea Change: Peril in the Gulf of Maine" (2 of 3) | July 31, 2024 | SC 102 |
| 974 | 11 | "Sea Change: Survival in the Gulf of Maine" (3 of 3) | August 7, 2024 | SC 103 |
| 975 | 12 | "Solar System: Storm Worlds" | October 2, 2024 | 5109 |
| 976 | 13 | "Solar System: Strange Worlds" | October 9, 2024 | 5110 |
| 977 | 14 | "Solar System: Volcano Worlds" | October 16, 2024 | 5111 |
| 978 | 15 | "Solar System: Icy Worlds" | October 23, 2024 | 5112 |
| 979 | 16 | "Solar System: Wandering Worlds" | October 30, 2024 | 5113 |
| 980 | 17 | "Decoding the Universe: Quantum" | November 6, 2024 | 5114 |
| 981 | 18 | "Building Stuff: Boost It!" | November 13, 2024 | 5115 |
| 982 | 19 | "Building Stuff: Reach It!" | November 20, 2024 | 5116 |
| 983 | 20 | "Building Stuff: Change It!" | November 27, 2024 | 5117 |
| 984 | 21 | "Lost Tombs of Notre Dame" | December 18, 2024 | 5118 |

=== Season 52: 2025 ===
| No. overall | No. in season | Title | Original release date | Prod. code |
|---|---|---|---|---|
| 985 | 1 | "What Are UFOs?" | January 22, 2025 | 5201 |
Scientists study UFOs to try to find whether they have terrestrial origin, are illusionary, or something else.
| 986 | 2 | "Extreme Airport Engineering" | January 29, 2025 | 5202 |
This episode focuses on the renovation efforts of LaGuardia International Airport, mainly focusing on the challenges resulting from the renovation of the passenger area while also maintaining passenger traffic and the construction of the skyways connecting the central passenger area and the multiple terminals
| 987 | 3 | "Dino Birds" | February 5, 2025 | 5203 |
| 988 | 4 | "Egypt's Tombs of Amun" | February 12, 2025 | 5204 |
| 989 | 5 | "Pompeii's Secret Underworld" | February 19, 2025 | 5205 |
| 990 | 6 | "Baltimore Bridge Collapse" | February 26, 2025 | 5206 |
This episode focuses on the Francis Scott Key Bridge collapse. The episode serves as an overview of the incident, as well as looking into the cause of it. The episode also secondarily focuses on the structural design of the Francis Scott Key bridge.
| 991 | 7 | "Revolutionary War Weapons" | April 9, 2025 | 5207 |
| 992 | 8 | "Secrets of the Forest" | April 16, 2025 | 5208 |
| 993 | 9 | "Critical Condition: Health in Black America" | April 30, 2025 | 5209 |
| 994 | 10 | "Ultimate Crash Test: Countdown" | May 7, 2025 | 5210 |
| 995 | 11 | "Ultimate Crash Test: Impact" | May 14, 2025 | 5211 |
| 996 | 12 | "Human: Origins" | September 17, 2025 | 5212 |
| 997 | 13 | "Human: Journeys" | September 24, 2025 | 5213 |
| 998 | 14 | "Human: Neanderthal Encounters" | October 1, 2025 | 5214 |
| 999 | 15 | "Human: Into the Americas" | October 8, 2025 | 5215 |
| 1000 | 16 | "Human: Building Empires" | October 15, 2025 | 5216 |
| 1001 | 17 | "Ancient Desert Death Trap" | October 22, 2025 | 5217 |
| 1002 | 18 | "Superfloods" | October 29, 2025 | 5218 |
This episode focuses on the Effects of Hurricane Floyd in North Carolina, focusing on its impacts on Greenville, North Carolina and Tarboro, North Carolina before discussing the overall impacts of flooding and the effects of global warming on large-scale floods, as well as preventative measures against them.
| 1003 | 19 | "Operation Space Station: High-Risk Build" | November 5, 2025 | 5219 |
| 1004 | 20 | "Operation Space Station: Science and Survival" | November 12, 2025 | 5220 |

=== Season 53: 2026 ===
| No. overall | No. in season | Title | Original release date | Prod. code |
|---|---|---|---|---|
| 1005 | 1 | "Asteroids: Spark of Life?" | January 21, 2026 | 5301 |
| 1006 | 2 | "Angkor: Hidden Jungle Empire" | January 28, 2026 | 5302 |
| 1007 | 3 | "Can Dogs Talk?" | February 4, 2026 | 5303 |
| 1008 | 4 | "Mammal Origins" | February 11, 2026 | 5304 |
| 1009 | 5 | "Stone Age Temple Mystery" | February 25, 2026 | 5306 |
| 1010 | 6 | "Return to the Moon" | April 15, 2026 | 5308 |
| 1011 | 7 | "Rain Bombs" | April 22, 2026 | 5305 |
| 1012 | 8 | "Athens: Birth of Democracy" | April 29, 2026 | 5307 |
| 1013 | 9 | "The Battle To Breathe" | September 16, 2026 | 5309 |
| 1014 | 10 | "Knowledge Keepers" | September 23, 2026 | 5310 |
| 1015 | 11 | "Stone Age Masterpiece" | September 30, 2026 | 5311 |
| 1016 | 12 | "Space Wars" | October 7, 2026 | 5312 |
| 1017 | 13 | "Evolution: Brain Power" | October 14, 2026 | 5313 |
| 1018 | 14 | "Evolution: Need To Feed" | October 21, 2026 | 5314 |
| 1019 | 15 | "Evolution: Body Builders" | October 28, 2026 | 5315 |
| 1020 | 16 | "Evolution: The Mating Game" | November 4, 2026 | 5316 |
| 1021 | 17 | "Evolution: On The Run" | November 11, 2026 | 5317 |

== Sources ==
- "Nova – Past Television Programs". PBS. Retrieved on 20 December 2009
