= Making North America =

- DVD cover
- Genre: Documentary film
- Directed by: Peter Oxley and Gwyn Williams
- Narrated by: Kirk Johnson (Director of the Smithsonian National Museum of Natural History)
- Theme music composer: Ty Unwin
- Country of origin: United States
- Original language: English
- No. of episodes: Three one-hour episodes

Production
- Producer: Peter Oxleyl
- Cinematography: Piers Leigh
- Editors: Paul Shepard and Dan McCabe
- Running time: 3 h (180 min)
- Production company: Windfall Films

Original release
- Network: PBS
- Release: November 4, 2015

Making North America is a 2015 American documentary film which premiered nationwide on November 4, 2015. The PBS Nova film, comprising three episodes of one hour each, was hosted by Kirk Johnson (Director of the Smithsonian National Museum of Natural History); Peter Oxley directed the first episode while Gwyn Williams directed the second and third. The series describes the very beginnings and later developments of the North American continent: from the origin of planet Earth 4.54 billion years ago; to the various movements of tectonic plates and their effect on the sculpturing of the continent's land and mountains, including the Rocky Mountains, Yellowstone and the Grand Canyon; to the emergence of life on the continent and its later evolution; and, finally, to the more recent settlement of the land by humans. According to Johnson, "Most people will not have considered a time when there was no North America ... What was there before North America? How did it form? When did it start? How did it come together?"

== Episodes ==
No.	Title	Original release date
1	"Origins"	November 4, 2015
The very early formation of the North American continent over the first 3 billion years of the existence of Earth, after the origin of the planet 4.54 billion years ago, is presented. The appearance of the earliest life, possibly as early as 4.28 billion years ago, and later evolution, about 800 million years ago, from unicellular organisms to multicellular organisms, within the planet's ancient oceans, are described.
2	"Life"	November 11, 2015
The emergence of early life from ancient oceans onto the early North American continent, about 550 million years ago, and life's later evolution on land, are presented. Dinosaurs, like Tyrannosaurus rex (T. rex), as well as giant marine reptiles that lived in a huge ancient inland sea which covered the state of Kansas (and much more) about 100 million years ago, are described.
3	"Human"	November 18, 2015
The human settlement of the North American continent, as early as 40,000 years ago by Native American ancestors, and later, about 500 years ago, by European settlers, are presented. Modern-day geological processes and the possible consequences of human activities, such as the burning of fossil fuels, that pose potential risks to our human civilization, are described.

== Participants ==
The documentary film is narrated by Kirk Johnson and includes the following participants (alphabetized by last name):

- Brian Atwater (U.S. Geological Survey)
- Doug Bamforth (University of Colorado)
- Chuck Bonner (fossil hunter)
- Doug Boyer (Duke University)
- Chris Goldfinger (Oregon State University)
- Carrie Howard (lead preparator)
- Kirk Johnson (narrator and Director of the
  Smithsonian National Museum of Natural History)
- David Loope (seismologist)
- Tyler Lyson (Denver Museum of Nature & Science)
- Patrick Mahaffy (homeowner)
- Cameron McLean (exploration manager)
- David R. Montgomery (author, The Hidden Half of Nature)
- A. B. Olevic (project superintendent)
- Bob Patten (author/flintknapper)
- Noah Planavsky (Yale University)
- Pamela Reid (University of Miami)
- Joseph Sertich (Denver Museum of Nature & Science)
- Barbara Shelton (fossil hunter)
- Scott Travis (park archaeologist)
- Joe Watkins (National Park Service)
- Lisa White (UC Museum of Paleontology)
- Emily Wolin (geophysicist)

== Reception ==
According to James Gaines, film reviewer for LiveScience, "North America rocks. That's what a new three-part series from NOVA shows as it explores the rich history of the continent — from glaciers in Alaska to volcanoes in Hawaii to the crystal-clear waters of the Bahamas." Joanne Ostrow, television critic for the Denver Post, writes, "Thanks to innovative special effects and graphics, this dose of earth science is visually engaging ... The graphics let us see how a slab of ocean floor diving under the earth forced the land up ... Johnson [the narrator] is enthusiastic good company, a regular guy whether rappelling into the Grand Canyon, flying over an active volcano in Hawaii, hunting for fossils in Alaska where palm trees once flourished, or descending into the palladium mines of Ontario, where geologists have dated some of the oldest rock ever found in North America ... there's much to learn from this series and, thanks to rock-solid storytelling, it's mind-blowing but easy to grasp."

== See also ==
- Abiogenesis
- Continental drift
- Earth science
- Evolution
- List of documentary films
- List of Nova episodes
